= Kaanchi (2014 film) =

2014 Indian film by Subhash Ghai

- Promotional Poster
- Directed by: Subhash Ghai
- Written by: Subhash Ghai
- Produced by: Subhash Ghai
- Starring: Mishti Chakraborty; Kartik Aaryan; Rishi Kapoor; Mithun Chakraborty
- Cinematography: Tushar Kanti Ray
- Edited by: Aarif Sheikh
- Music by: Songs: Ismail Darbar; Salim–Sulaiman; Background Score: Simaab Sen
- Production company: Mukta Arts
- Distributed by: White Hill Studios
- Release date: 25 April 2014
- Running time: 140 minutes
- Country: India
- Language: Hindi

Kaanchi: The Unbreakable is a 2014 Indian Hindi-language drama film written, directed and produced by Subhash Ghai.The film stars debutant Mishti Chakraborty, and Kartik Aaryan in lead roles alongside Rishi Kapoor and Mithun Chakraborty in supporting roles. The film was released on 25 April 2014.

== Plot ==
Kaanchi ‘Sigdi’ is a strong girl who lives with her mother and sister in the village of Koshampa. She is in love with her childhood friend Binda, and their families decide to get them married. Meanwhile, the Kakda family tries to occupy Koshampa and turn it into an industrial hub. Sushant, the son of Shyam Kakda, falls in love with Kaanchi and wants to marry her, but Kaanchi rejects him. Because of this, Sushant kills Binda before their wedding in front of Kaanchi. A furious Kaanchi leaves for Mumbai, seeking revenge on the Kakda family. She lives in the house of Bagulla, her old friend. She finds a servant job at Shyam Kakda's house through some contacts. She tries to expose his affair with his secretary as well as the truth behind Binda's murder by recording a video in his bedroom, but she gets caught by the guard however she safely escapes while losing her phone. After a few days, she finds out that Sushant is returning to India and is going to stay with Jumar Kakda. She becomes a servant in his house with Bagulla's help. She manages to steal the chip, which has all the secret information about their business. Meanwhile, she gets her phone back from her friend who works at Shyam Kakda's house. She submits the evidence to a news channel, cripples the business of the Kakda family, and also saves her village, Koshampu. However, Bagulla, who is a secret agent helping the Kakda family, sells her to Sushant, who then captures Kaanchi's sister. Bagulla later changes his mind and comes back to help Kaanchi. In the end, Kaanchi kills Sushant, and returns to her village to rejoins her family.

== Cast ==
- Mishti Chakraborty as Kaanchi
- Kartik Aaryan as Binda Singh
- Rishi Kapoor as Jumar B. Kakda
- Mithun Chakraborty as Shyam Kakda
- Sahil Vaid as Sanjay Pathare
- Anil Charanjeett as Subhedhar, Binda's father
- Amardeep Jha as Meena Devi
- Adil Hussain as CBI Officer Arun Roy
- Anant Jog as Vedant
- Pallavi Purohit as Savita Pathare
- Amrita Raichand as Gayatri J. Kumar Kakda
- Rishabh Sinha as Sushant Kakda
- Natasha Rastogi as Teji, Kaanchi's mother
- Chandan Roy Sanyal as Inspector Ratanlal Bagulla
- Mahima Chaudhry as an item dancer (special appearance)
- Shakti Mohan as an item dancer in the song "Kambal Ke Keeche" (special appearance)
- Mukti Mohan as an item dancer in the song "Kambal Ke Keeche" (special appearance)
- Hazel Crowney as an item dancer in the song "Thumka"

== Reception ==
Kaanchi received mixed to negative reviews from critics. Subhash Ghai's direction was criticised compared to his previous movies Kalicharan, Karma, Karz and Pardes. The lead actress Mishti was praised for her divine beauty but her acting skills received mixed reviews.

The lead actor Kartik Aaryan, who made his debut in Pyaar Ka Punchnama, was praised for his tremendous screen presence and acting skills.

== Marketing and release ==
The film's trailer was released on 6 March 2014 on YouTube, which received positive reviews. Besides deploying their own marketing team, Mukta Arts partnered with web channel Trendspotters.tv for web and social-media promotion. Commenting on the film, Subash Ghai said, "Kaanchi to me is a project that is larger than life itself, the film, though commercial, is an inspirational story for the young women of today.

Kaanchi was released on 25 April 2014.

== Soundtrack ==
Kaanchi: The Unbreakable

Soundtrack album by Ismail Darbar, Salim–Sulaiman
- Released: 18 March 2014
- Genre: Feature film soundtrack
- Length: 39:08
- Label: Mukta Arts

Salim–Sulaiman chronology
Rabba Main Kya Karoon (2013)	Kaanchi: The Unbreakable (2014)

External audio
- Audio Jukebox on YouTube

All songs were composed by Ismail Darbar and Salim-Sulaiman; the lyrics were written by Irshad Kamil.

#	Song	Singer(s)	Composer	Duration
1	"Kaanchi Re Kaanchi"	Sukhwinder Singh	Ismail Darbar	04:06
2	"Tu Sab Kuch Re"	Sonu Nigam, Anwesha Datta Gupta, Ismail Darbar	Ismail Darbar	05:36
3	"Main Mushtanda"	Aishwarya Majmudar, Mika Singh	Ismail Darbar	03:05
4	"Koshampa"	Aman Trikha, Sanchita Bhattacharya, Anwesha Datta Gupta, Subhash Ghai	Ismail Darbar	03:32
5	"Kaisa Hai Dard Mera"	Ankit Tiwari	Ismail Darbar	04:46
6	"Kambal Ke Neech"	Aishwarya Majmudar, Neeti Mohan, Aman Trikha, Sanchita Bhattacharya	Ismail Darbar	03:47
7	"Thumka"	Sonu Nigam, Suzanne D'Mello	Salim-Sulaiman	04:45
8	"Hindustan Kahan Hai"	Sukhwinder Singh, Mohit Chauhan, Raj Pandit	Salim-Sulaiman	04:50
9	"Adiye Adiye"	Sanchita Bhattacharya, Avril Quadros	Ismail Darbar	02:32
