= Mukta Arts =

Indian film production company

Mukta Arts Ltd.
- Type: Public
- Traded as: BSE: 532357; NSE: MUKTAARTS
- ISIN: INE374B01019
- Industry: Entertainment
- Founded: 24 October 1978 by Subhash Ghai
- Headquarters: Mumbai, India
- Key people: Subhash Ghai (chairman); Rahul Puri (managing director)
- Website: Mukta Arts

Mukta Arts Limited is an Indian film production company, headquartered in Mumbai. Established in 1978, the company is involved in the production, distribution, exhibition and education in cinema and creative arts and production of digital software in television serials, web series and documentaries. It is the first Hindi film production company that listed on the stock exchange. Mukta Arts Limited has produced and co-produced 42 films in Hindi and other languages till date. It has distributed over 400 movies under the brand name Mukta movies distributors. In 2012 it entered into exhibition sector and launched its own chain of multiplex theatres under the name Mukta A2 Cinemas, now present at 18 locations in India including one in Bahrain with 54 screens.

The company also runs Whistling Woods International, a Film, Communication and Media Arts Institute since 2006.

== History ==
On 24 October 1978 film maker Subhash Ghai set up his own film production company Mukta Films and produced a film titled Karz. In 1982, Subhash Ghai formed a new independent company as Mukta Arts Private Limited and produced and directed many movies including Hero, Karma, Ram Lakhan, Saudagar, Trimurti, Khalnayak, Pardes, and Taal till 2000.

In 2000, Mukta Arts Limited became first Company from the Hindi Film Industry to be listed on the stock exchanges in India. Subsequently, it produced commercial movies like Yaadein, Aitraaz, Kisna, 36 China Town, Yuvraaj and Apna Sapna Money Money. In 2003, it produced low budget movies under the banner of Mukta searchlight films including Iqbal, Joggers Park, Rahul and Black & White. It won a National Award for IQBAL as best film on other social issues in 2006. It also set up a division for regional movies which produced three Marathi, one Bengali, one Punjabi and one Kannada movies. It set up its own all India distribution network and released many Hindi and English movies.

== Key people ==
Subhash Ghai is the Founder and Chairman of Mukta Arts while Rahul Puri is the Managing Director. Prabuddha Gupta is the CFO of the group.

== Film insurance ==
Mukta Arts became the first Indian film production company to establish the practice of securing film insurance through its movie ‘Taal’. The policy is now named the 'Cine Mukta' Policy.

== Whistling Woods ==
In 2006 Mukta Arts Ltd promoted and set up India's largest Film and Television Training Institute at Film City, Mumbai called Whistling Woods International (WWI). It is affiliated with TISS (Tata Institute of Social Sciences) and provides Diplomas and Degrees to students in Arts and Crafts of Cinema, Animation, Music, Fashion and Management. The institute serves as a contributor and advisor to the Indian government through the Skills Ministry and the HRD Ministry.

== Mukta A2 Cinemas ==
In the exhibition sector Mukta Arts Ltd holds a chain of multiplexes across India under Mukta A2 Cinema with 18 locations and 54 screens including one in Bahrain. Mukta Arts Ltd also has a joint venture in the exhibition programming space with a 55:45 shareholding split with UFO in the company Mukta VN. Mukta A2 Cinemas has also entered into a joint venture with Asian Cinemas under name Asian Mukta A2 Cinemas LLP which operates 10 screens in South India.

== Mukta Digital Studio ==
The digital arm of Mukta Arts Ltd is known as Mukta Digital Studio which oversees Mukta Arts group's content on television, web and various mobile platforms in production and acquisition. Mukta Digital Studio has already produced short films and music videos for Skill India, Communal Harmony, Namami gange, Kumbh India and Tree Plantation for various government departments.

== Filmography ==
Year	Film	Language
1976	Kalicharan	Hindi
1978	Gautam Govinda	Hindi
1980	Karz	Hindi
1983	Hero	Hindi
1985	Paisa Yeh Paisa	Hindi
1986	Karma	Hindi
1987	Uttar Dakshin	Hindi
1989	Ram Lakhan	Hindi
1991	Saudagar	Hindi
1992	Prem Deewane	Hindi
1993	Khalnayak	Hindi
1995	Trimurti	Hindi
1997	Pardes	Hindi
1998	Sham Ghanshyam	Hindi
1999	Taal	Hindi
2001	Yaadein	Hindi
2001	Rahul	Hindi
2002	Badhai ho Badhai	Hindi
2003	Joggers Park	Hindi
2003	Ek Aur Ek Gyarah	Hindi
2004	Aitraaz	Hindi
2005	Iqbal	Hindi
2005	Kisna: The Warrior Poet	Hindi
2006	36 China Town	Hindi
2006	Shaadi Se Pehle	Hindi
2006	Apna Sapna Money Money	Hindi
2007	Good Boy, Bad Boy	Hindi
2007	Khanna & Iyer	Hindi
2008	Bombay to Bangkok	Hindi
2008	Yuvvraaj	Hindi
2008	Black & White	Hindi
2009	Paying Guests	Hindi
2010	Right Yaaa Wrong	Hindi
2010	Hello Darling	Hindi
2011	Love Express	Hindi
2011	Cycle Kick	Hindi
2011	Kashmakash	Hindi
2014	Kaanchi: The Unbreakable	Hindi
2014	Nimbehuli	Kannada
2015	Hero	Hindi
2008	Sanai Choghade	Marathi
2008	Valu – The Wild Bull	Marathi
2013	Samhita	Marathi
2011	Noukadubi	Bengali
2014	Double Di Trouble	Punjabi
2022	36 Farmhouse	Hindi

== See also ==
- Subhash Ghai
- Whistling Woods International Institute
