= Khal Nayak =

1993 Indian film by Subhash Ghai

- Poster
- Directed by: Subhash Ghai
- Written by: Subhash Ghai; Ram Kelkar; Kamlesh Pandey
- Produced by: Subhash Ghai
- Starring: Sanjay Dutt; Madhuri Dixit; Jackie Shroff; Raakhee; Anupam Kher
- Cinematography: Ashok Mehta
- Edited by: Waman Bhonsle; Gurudutt Shirali
- Music by: Songs: Laxmikant–Pyarelal; Score: Aadesh Shrivastava
- Production company: Mukta Arts Ltd.
- Distributed by: Eros International
- Release date: 6 August 1993
- Running time: 191 minutes
- Country: India
- Language: Hindi
- Box office: ₹24 crores

Khal Nayak (transl. Villain) is a 1993 Indian Hindi-language action crime film written, directed, and produced by Subhash Ghai under his production company Mukta Arts Ltd. The film stars Sanjay Dutt in the titular role, with Madhuri Dixit, Anupam Kher, Rakhee Gulzar and Jackie Shroff in supporting roles. The film's plot follows two police officers, Ram and Ganga, as they attempt to apprehend escaped criminal Ballu.

Khal Nayak was released on 6 August 1993 and became the second highest grossing film of 1993. At the 39th Filmfare Awards (1994), the film received 11 nominations, winning Best Female Playback Singer and Best Choreography. A sequel titled Khalnayak Returns was announced in April 2026.

== Plot ==
Balram "Ballu" Prasad, a wanted criminal, is apprehended by Inspector Ram, who is investigating the criminal activities of Roshan Da, Ballu’s mentor. During interrogation, Ballu refuses to disclose information about Roshan Da. He escapes custody with assistance from his associates, leading to public criticism and Ram's suspension.

To help restore Ram’s reputation, his fiancée and fellow officer, Inspector Ganga, volunteers for an undercover assignment. Disguised as a street performer, she locates Ballu and gradually earns his trust. Through their interactions, she learns about his history and the circumstances that led him to a life of crime.

Ballu develops romantic feelings for Ganga, unaware of her true identity. Upon discovering she is a police officer, he feels betrayed and becomes hostile. Despite this, Ganga continues her mission and refuses to withdraw from the assignment.

Meanwhile, Ram visits Ballu’s mother, Aarti, who reveals that Ballu and Ram were childhood friends. She explains how Roshan Da exploited their family’s difficulties and manipulated Ballu into believing that the police were responsible for his sister Sunita’s death. This misinformation fueled Ballu’s turn to a life of crime.

As the manhunt for Ballu intensifies, Ganga assists him in escaping during a police pursuit. She is subsequently arrested and charged with aiding a fugitive, damaging her professional standing and public image. Ballu, now in hiding, reunites with his mother but is attacked by Roshan Da, who views him as a threat.

Inspector Ram leads a police operation against Roshan Da. During the confrontation, Ballu learns the truth about his sister’s death and Roshan Da’s involvement. Ram kills Roshan Da during the operation, while Ballu manages to flee.

Learning that Ganga is on trial for assisting him, Ballu voluntarily returns, confesses to his crimes, and testifies that Ganga acted under official orders. His testimony leads to Ganga’s acquittal. Ballu is sentenced to life imprisonment.

== Cast ==
- Sanjay Dutt as Balaram "Ballu" Prasad, a notorious criminal working for Roshan Da
- Jackie Shroff as Inspector Ram Kumar Sinha, a hardworking and honest police officer
- Madhuri Dixit as Sub-Inspector Gangotri "Ganga" Singh, an undercover police officer and Ram's girlfriend
- Anupam Kher as Ishwar Pandey, Inspector General of Police and Ram's distant uncle
- Rakhee Gulzar as Aarti Prasad, Ballu’s mother
- Siddharth Randeria as Navin Prasad, the public prosecutor against Roshan Da, and Ballu’s father
- Aloka Mukherjee as Sunita Prasad, Ballu's elder sister
- Ramya Krishna as Sophia Sulochana, Ballu's mistress
- Pramod Moutho as Roshan "Roshan Da" Mahanta, Ballu's mentor
- Sushmita Mukherjee as Mrs. Maithili Pandey
- Arun Bali as Police Commissioner Kuljeet Chaddha
- Anand Balraj as a police inspector
- A. K. Hangal as Shaukat Bhai
- Sudhir Dalvi as Shambhu Master, a village school teacher
- Neena Gupta as Champa, a dancer in the song "Choli Ke Peeche Kya Hai"
- Ali Asgar as Munna, a thug working for Roshan Da
- Sunil Shende as the judge at Ganga's trial
- Hans Dev Sharma as Ram’s assistant investigation officer

== Production ==
Director Subhash Ghai initially envisioned the project as an art film starring Nana Patekar. The original concept followed the protagonist's journey from Pune to Mumbai. During production, influenced by a screenwriter's suggestion, Ghai reoriented the film towards the action genre.

Anil Kapoor expressed interest in playing Ballu. However, Ghai advised against it, stating that Kapoor was not suitable for the role and that his casting could jeopardise the film's success. Sanjay Dutt was subsequently cast.

During filming, Dutt was arrested and imprisoned in connection with the 1993 Bombay bombings.

Ghai raised objections at the Indian Motion Picture Producers' Association (IMPPA) against Khal-Naaikaa, a similarly titled film scheduled for the same release date as Khal Nayak. However, the IMPPA ruled against him, stating that while Ghai could alter his film's release date, the producers of Khal-Naaikaa were not required to change theirs. Consequently, both films were released on 6 August 1993.

== Awards ==
Award	Date of the ceremony	Category	Recipients	Result	Ref.
Filmfare Awards	12 February 1994	Best Film	Khal Nayak	Nominated	
Filmfare Awards	12 February 1994	Best Director	Subhash Ghai	Nominated	
Filmfare Awards	12 February 1994	Best Actor	Sanjay Dutt	Nominated	
Filmfare Awards	12 February 1994	Best Actress	Madhuri Dixit	Nominated	
Filmfare Awards	12 February 1994	Best Supporting Actor	Jackie Shroff	Nominated	
Filmfare Awards	12 February 1994	Best Music Director	Laxmikant–Pyarelal	Nominated	
Filmfare Awards	12 February 1994	Best Lyricist	Anand Bakshi for "Choli Ke Peeche Kya Hai"	Nominated	
Filmfare Awards	12 February 1994	Best Male Playback Singer	Vinod Rathod for "Nayak Nahin Khal Nayak Hoon Main"	Nominated	
Filmfare Awards	12 February 1994	Best Female Playback Singer	Alka Yagnik and Ila Arun for "Choli Ke Peeche Kya Hai"	Won	
Filmfare Awards	12 February 1994	Best Female Playback Singer	Alka Yagnik for "Paalki Pe Ho Ke Sawaar"	Nominated	
Filmfare Awards	12 February 1994	Best Choreography	Saroj Khan for "Choli Ke Peeche Kya Hai"	Won	

== Soundtrack ==
The soundtrack of Khal Nayak was composed by Laxmikant–Pyarelal with lyrics by Anand Bakshi.

#	Title	Singer(s)
1.	"Khal Nayak Hai Tu"	Kavita Krishnamurthy & Ila Arun
2.	"Choli Ke Peeche Kya Hai"	Alka Yagnik & Ila Arun
3.	"Palki Pe Hoke"	Alka Yagnik
4.	"Aaja Sajan Aaja"	Alka Yagnik
5.	"Aise Teri Yaad Aati Hai	Alka Yagnik & Mohammed Aziz
6.	"O Maa Tujhe Salam"	Jagjit Singh
7.	"Aye Sahib Yeh Theek Nahin"	Alka Yagnik & Manhar Udhas
8.	"Pyar Ki Ganga Bahe"	Mohammed Aziz, Udit Narayan, Manhar Udhas & Jolly Mukherjee
9.	"Choli Ke Peeche (Male)"	Vinod Rathod
10.	"Khal Nayak Hoon Main"	Kavita Krishnamurthy & Vinod Rathod

== Reception ==
Khal Nayak was a major commercial success at the box office, grossing ₹240 million, $7.7 million, worldwide. It was the second-highest-grossing Hindi film of the year, surpassed only by Aankhen.

At 10 million copies, the film’s soundtrack was the year’s third best-selling album in India. The song "Choli Ke Peeche Kya Hai" ("What's Behind the Choli") generated controversy due to its suggestive lyrics.

== Remakes ==
Khal Nayak was remade in Telugu as Khaidi No. 1 (1994), in Tamil as Hero (1994), and in Punjabi as Billa (2002). The song "Choli Ke Peeche" was remade for the 2024 film Crew.

== Sequel ==
A sequel, named Khalnayak Returns, was announced in April 2026, starring Sanjay Dutt.
