= Anil Charanjeett =

Indian actor

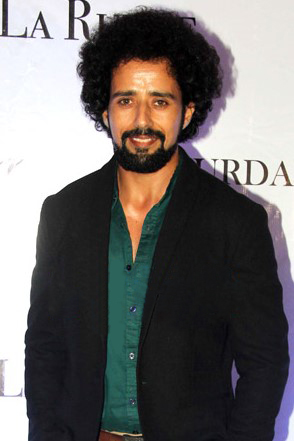
- Other name: Anil Mange
- Occupations: Actor, Comedian
- Years active: 2014 – present
- Height: 5 ft 9 in (175 cm)

Anil Charanjeett, also known as Anil Mange, is an Indian film actor who has worked in Bollywood films like PK, Singh Is Bling, Raees and Hasee Toh Phasee. He gave a special appearance in the song "Main Badhiya Tu Bhi Badhiya" from the movie Sanju.

== Background ==
Anil charanjeett comes from Balaghat in Madhya Pradesh. After graduating in commerce, he joined Whistling Woods International Institute in Mumbai. Mange's father was a businessman who wanted him to join the family business, but he chose to go into acting instead.

== Filmography ==
Year	Film	Role
2010	Hello Darling	Ashish Singh
2011	Love Express	Sujaan Singh
2014	Hasee Toh Phasee	Abhinandan Mishra - the Kanpur Idol, Anu Malik fan
2014	PK	Character dressed as Lord Shiva
2014	Kaanchi	Subedar
2015	Hero	Sooraj's Friend
2015	Baankey Ki Crazy Baraat	Rajinder Sood
2015	Singh Is Bliing	Parmeshwar Singh Bharara alias Pompy
2017	Raees	Qasim Bhai
2017	Mubarakan	Krishna Chaitanya Sharma alias Chintu
2017	Golmaal Again	Mr. Naidu
2017	Dum Dum Dumroo	Dumroo
2018	GujjuBhai: Most Wanted	Shahrukh, the terrorist
2018	Sanju	One of the bar singers in the song "Main Badhiya Tu Bhi Badhiya"
2018	Sacred Games	Chota Badriya
2018	Namaste England	Illegal Immigrant of Pakistan
2018	Simmba	Purab
2019	Setters	
2021	Shershaah	Naib Subedar Bansi Lal Sharma
2021	Sooryavanshi	AtmaRam
2022	Bhool Bhulaiyaa 2	Raghu
2022	Thai Massage	Jhandu Singh
2022	Cirkus	Prem
2023	Kaala	Danish Khan
2024	Sarfira	Mandar
2025	Kis Kisko Pyaar Karoon 2	Mahmood
