= Mukta A2 Cinemas =

Indian cinema chain

- Industry: Entertainment (Movie Theatres)
- Founded: July 2011
- Headquarters: Mumbai, India
- Key people: Subhash Ghai (Chairman); Rahul Puri (Managing Director)
- Website: muktaa2cinemas.com

Mukta A2 Cinemas is one of the several cinema chains in India. It is fully owned and operated by Mukta Arts Ltd. The company began its commercial operations in July 2011 with its launch in Vadodara city, Gujarat, India. The founder of company is Subhash Ghai.

== Philosophy ==
Mukta A2 CINEMAS, was formed in year 2016. It is a fully owned subsidiary of Mukta Arts Ltd founded by Subhash Ghai. With an aim to provide a multiplex experience at affordable prices, the company is currently present in 20 locations with 48 screens across the country and an international presence with a 6 screen multiplex theater in the Kingdom of Bahrain.

In 2017, it formed a Joint Venture company with South India's renowned Asian Cinemas to build and operate single screens across South India. As a part of this agreement, the cinema chain has already commenced operations in some markets across the southern circuit like Gangavathi, Thandur, Nizamabad, Sadashiv Peth, and Kothagude.

== Locations ==
Mukta A2 Cinemas multiplexes are across India. In September 2016, the chain expanded its presence in International Markets, with their first Multiplex in the Kingdom of Bahrain, where Mukta A2 Cinemas were established in Juffair Mall.

== See also ==
- Subhash Ghai
- Mukta Arts
