= Hero (1994 film) =

- Theatrical release poster
- Directed by: A. Jagannathan
- Written by: Aaroor Dass (dialogues)
- Story by: Subhash Ghai
- Based on: Khal Nayak
- Starring: Vinod Kumar Alva; Rahman; Sukanya
- Cinematography: Babu
- Edited by: Kotagiri Venkateswara Rao
- Music by: Maragathamani
- Production company: Shri Sowdamini Creators
- Distributed by: Gattani Film
- Release date: 16 September 1994
- Country: India
- Language: Tamil

Hero is a 1994 Indian Tamil-language action thriller film directed by A. Jagannathan. It is a remake of the 1993 Hindi film Khal Nayak. The film stars Vinod Kumar Alva, Rahman and Sukanya. It was released on 16 September 1994.

== Plot ==
Raja, a notorious criminal and loyal associate of the underworld leader Roshan, is arrested by Inspector Ramu, who is determined to dismantle Roshan's criminal network. During questioning, Raja refuses to reveal any information about his mentor. With the help of his gang members, he escapes from police custody, leading to public outrage and damaging Ramu's reputation.

To help capture Raja and restore the police department's credibility, Inspector Seetha volunteers for an undercover mission. Disguising herself as a street performer, she infiltrates Raja's world and gradually gains his trust. As she spends time with him, she discovers that beneath his criminal exterior lies a man shaped by manipulation and tragedy.

Raja falls in love with Seetha, unaware that she is a police officer. When he eventually learns the truth, he feels betrayed and becomes furious. However, Seetha remains committed to her mission and continues pursuing justice despite the personal risks involved.

Meanwhile, Ramu meets Raja's mother, who reveals a long-hidden truth: Raja and Ramu were childhood friends. She explains how Roshan exploited their family's hardships and deceived Raja into believing that the police were responsible for his sister's death. Consumed by anger and misinformation, Raja was drawn into a life of crime.

As the search for Raja intensifies, Seetha helps him evade capture during a police chase. Her actions lead to her arrest and suspension, tarnishing her professional reputation. Raja later reunites with his mother, but Roshan, fearing Raja may expose him, turns against his former protégé and attempts to eliminate him.

Ramu launches a major operation against Roshan and his gang. During the final confrontation, Raja learns the truth about his sister's death and realizes that Roshan had manipulated him for years. A fierce battle follows, ending with Ramu killing Roshan and destroying his criminal empire. Raja escapes but is forever changed by the revelations.

When Raja learns that Seetha is facing trial for helping him, he voluntarily surrenders to the authorities. In court, he confesses to his crimes and testifies that Seetha acted in the line of duty. His testimony clears her name and leads to her acquittal.

In the end, Raja accepts responsibility for his actions and is sentenced to life imprisonment, while Ramu and Seetha are vindicated, bringing the story to a bittersweet conclusion.

== Cast ==
- Vinod Kumar Alva as Raja
- Rahman as Ramu
- Sukanya as Seetha
- S. S. Chandran
- Annapurna
- Rocky
- P. J. Sarma
- Y. Vijaya

== Soundtrack ==
The music was composed by Maragathamani and lyrics were written by Vairamuthu. The songs "Nallavan Illai" and "Sollikkul Enna Irukku" are based on "Nayak Nahi" and "Choli Ke Peeche", respectively, from the original Hindi film.

Track listing
No.	Title	Singer(s)	Length
1.	"Sollikkul Enna Irukku"	K. S. Chithra, Malgudi Subha
2.	"Nallavan Illai Nee"	Mano, Malgudi Subha
3.	"Pura Pura Penn Pura"	S. P. Balasubrahmanyam, K. S. Chithra
4.	"Kannadi Paarka Vandhen"	S. P. Balasubrahmanyam
5.	"Nallavano Kettavano"	Malgudi Subha

== Release and reception ==
Hero was released on 16 September 1994 by Gattani Film. Malini Mannath of The Indian Express noted that the director remained faithful to the original film and that Vinod Kumar was made to imitate Sanjay Dutt while finding the performances of Rahman and Sukanya as adequate.
