= Karma (1986 film) =

- Poster
- Directed by: Subhash Ghai
- Written by: Sachin Bhowmick; Subhash Ghai; Kader Khan
- Produced by: Subhash Ghai
- Starring: Dilip Kumar; Nutan; Jackie Shroff; Anil Kapoor; Naseeruddin Shah; Anupam Kher; Sridevi; Poonam Dhillon; Shakti Kapoor
- Cinematography: Kamalakar Rao
- Edited by: Waman Bhonsle; Gurudutt Shirali
- Music by: Laxmikant-Pyarelal
- Distributed by: Mukta Arts Ltd.; Lousanne Films
- Release date: 8 August 1986
- Running time: 194 minutes
- Country: India
- Language: Hindi

Karma (transl: Deed) is a 1986 Indian Hindi-language action thriller film directed by Subhash Ghai and featuring an ensemble cast including Dilip Kumar, Nutan, Jackie Shroff, Anil Kapoor, Naseeruddin Shah, Sridevi, Poonam Dhillon, Satyanarayana Kaikala and Anupam Kher. The film reunites Subhash Ghai and Dilip Kumar after the success of their last film together Vidhaata (1982). The film also marked the first time Dilip Kumar was paired with veteran actress Nutan. It was the top grossing Indian film of 1986 and the eleventh highest-grossing Bollywood film of the decade.

== Plot ==
Rana Vishwa Pratap Singh, an ex-high ranking police officer is in charge of a jail that successfully reforms criminals. He is informed that Dr. Michael Dang, the head of a major terrorist organisation, Black Star has been captured, and is being transferred to his prison. Dang assaults a jail warden during an argument and Vishwa slaps Dang. Dang vows revenge for it.

While Vishwa is away, Black Star terrorists free Dang by launching a surprise attack, destroying the prison and killing Vishwa's family who lived nearby. However, his wife, Rukmani and his youngest son are spared. And Rukmani lost her speech. After a period of mourning, Vishwa embarks on a mission to bring Dang and Black Star to justice. The mission is approved by the Indian Government, and Vishwa successfully recruits Baiju Thakur, Janeshwar Prasad (Jani), and an ex-terrorist Khairuddin "Khairu" Kishti.

Under the disguise of a forest ranger, Vishwa sets up bases near the Indian border where they believe Dang's compound is located. Vishwa, Baiju, Jani and Khairu form a strong bond during their training, and Baiju and Jani fall in love with Radha and Tulsi respectively. Khairu pleads with Vishwa to let Baiju and Jani leave as he believes they have been reformed. Vishwa is unhappy to hear this.

As far as Vishwa is concerned their only motive was to complete the mission. The terrorists shoot him while he protects Baiju, Jani and Khairu who are locked in a nearby building. Vishwa is hospitalised. The three soldiers are distraught and realize they need to complete the mission for Singh.

They receive intelligence on the exact location of Dr Dang's compound which they successfully infiltrate. With the help of Indian army soldiers who have been held captive by the terrorists, they set about destroying the compound and killing the terrorists. It soon becomes apparent that the destruction of the heavily guarded munitions center is the only way the terrorist organisation can be defeated. Khairu hatches a plan that involves driving a truck filled with explosives into the heart of the building. Baiju and Jani argue that the plan is too dangerous and they would all be killed in the process. Khairuddin decides to sacrifice himself to secure victory. Jani and Baiju return to the main compound and kill the remaining terrorists bringing the battle to its conclusion. Singh, having made a swift recovery, joins the battle and kills Dr. Dang thus completing the mission and Rukmani gets her speech back.

The two surviving soldiers are awarded bravery medals and a posthumous award is granted to Khairu. Baiju and Jani marry their respective loves, Radha and Tulsi.

== Cast ==
| Actor | Role | Other |
|---|---|---|
| Dilip Kumar | Rana Vishwa Pratap Singh/Dada Thakur | Jail Superintendent |
| Nutan | Rukmani V.P. Singh | Rana Vishwa Pratap Singh/Dada Thakur’s Wife |
| Jackie Shroff | Baiju Thakur | |
| Anil Kapoor | Jani/Janeshwar Prasad | |
| Naseeruddin Shah | Khairuddin ‘Khairu’ Kishti | |
| Sridevi | Radha | Baiju's Love Interest |
| Poonam Dhillon | Tulsi | Johnny’s Love Interest |
| Anupam Kher | Dr. Michael Dang | The Main Antagonist |
| Dara Singh | Dharma | Dada Thakur's Friend |
| Kishori Shahane | Heena | Khairuddin's Love Interest (Guest Role) |
| Shakti Kapoor | Jagga/Jolly | Dharma's younger brother /Dr. Dang's Henchman |
| Tom Alter | Rexon | Dr. Dang's Henchman |
| Manik Irani | Goon | Dr. Dang's Henchman |
| Bindu | Ambika Chachi | Tulsi's Paternal Aunt |
| Sharat Saxena | Somu, Local Goon | Chachi's Man |
| Shammi | Mausi | Dharma's Aunt |
| C.S. Dubey | | Assistant of Kittam Kittu |
| Satish Kaul | Sunil Pratap Singh | Dada Thakur's Eldest Son |
| Beena | Sunil's Wife | |
| Kaikala Satyanarayana | Kittam Kittu | |
| Shashi Puri | Anil Pratap Singh | Dada Thakur's 2nd Son |
| Jugal Hansraj | Dada Thakur's youngest son | (child artist) |
| Mukri | Chotte Khan | Policeman in Dada Thakur's Jail |
| Viju Khote | | Jailor in Agra Jail |
| Vinod Nagpal | Tripathi | Home Minister |
| Dan Dhanoa | Gyan Singh, Indian Army officer | Prisoner of BSO's Jail |
| Subhash Ghai | Pedestrian with bicycle on his shoulder | Special Appearance |
| Kamaldeep | Viren | Brother of Rukmani V P Singh |

== Soundtrack ==
Music: Laxmikant-Pyarelal Lyrics: Anand Bakshi

| # | Title | Singer(s) | Raga |
|---|---|---|---|
| 1 | "Karma (Introduction)" | Arun Bakshi | |
| 2 | "De Daru" | Kishore Kumar, Mahendra Kapoor, Manhar Udhas | |
| 3 | "Na Jaiyo Pardes" | Kishore Kumar, Kavita Krishnamurthy | Shivaranjani |
| 4 | "Mera Karma Tu" | Manhar Udhas, Mohammad Aziz, Suresh Wadkar | |
| 5 | "Aye Watan Tere Liye" | Mohammad Aziz, Kavita Krishnamurthy | |
| 6 | "Aye Sanam Tere Liye" | Dilip Kumar, Mohammad Aziz, Kavita Krishnamurthy | |
| 7 | "Maine Rab Se Tujhe" | Manhar Udhas, Anuradha Paudwal, Sukhwinder Singh | |
| 8 | "Aye Mohabbat Teri Dastan" | Anuradha Paudwal | |
