= Hero (2015 Hindi film) =

2015 Indian Hindi-language romantic action film

- Theatrical release poster
- Directed by: Nikhil Advani
- Written by: Umesh Bist
- Based on: Hero by Subhash Ghai
- Produced by: Salman Khan; Subhash Ghai
- Starring: Sooraj Pancholi; Athiya Shetty; Aditya Pancholi
- Cinematography: Tushar Kanti Ray
- Edited by: Ritesh Soni
- Music by: Songs: Amaal Mallik; Meet Bros Anjjan; Sachin–Jigar; Jassi Katyal; Score: Sandeep Shirodkar
- Production companies: Salman Khan Films; Mukta Arts; Emmay Entertainment
- Distributed by: Eros International
- Release date: 11 September 2015
- Running time: 145 minutes
- Country: India
- Language: Hindi
- Budget: ₹36 crore
- Box office: ₹34.82 crore

Hero is a 2015 Indian Hindi-language romantic action film directed by Nikhil Advani, written by Umesh Bist, and produced by Salman Khan and Subhash Ghai under Salman Khan Films and Mukta Arts, with Eros International serving as distributor. A remake of Ghai's 1983 blockbuster film of the same name, which starred Jackie Shroff, the film stars debutantes Sooraj Pancholi and Athiya Shetty, son of actor Aditya Pancholi and daughter of actor Sunil Shetty respectively. Aditya Pancholi has an important role in the film himself.

The film was released on 11 September 2015 worldwide and received negative reviews from critics.

Playizzon, an Indian mobile video game developer, also released Hero: The Official Game an action game based on the film.

== Plot ==
Sooraj Kaushik is a gangster from Mumbai who meets Radha Mathur, daughter of the city's Chief of Police, IG Shrikant Mathur, during a party. Sooraj, under instructions from his gangster father, Suryakant 'Pasha' Ranade, pretends to be a police officer and kidnaps Radha because Shrikant presented evidence against Pasha in court. Radha believes the ruse and leaves the city, travelling to an isolated location in Jammu with Suraj and his friends.

During these days, they slowly fall in love. While in Mumbai Pasha uses the kidnapping to threaten Mathur. Soon, the group is discovered by the police led by Radha's brother, Dheeraj. The couple escape although Radha believes they are being attacked by Pasha's men, and in the ensuing chase, Sooraj is shot in the arm while trying to jump over a broken bridge and they both fall into the water. This leads the police and the world to believe both Radha and Suraj are dead. Both Radha's family and Pasha are enraged by the news and the latter swears to avenge Suraj's death.

Unaware of all this the couple are rescued by some Buddhist monks. Sooraj, who was severely injured, remained unconscious and Radha stays by his side and confesses her feelings. Sooraj who has fallen in love with Radha as well confessed to her that he had kidnapped her and that he was Pasha's henchman. She has, however, fallen in love with him and asks him to surrender.

When they return to the city Sooraj is coldly intercepted and held at gunpoint by Shrikant. During a fatal attempt on Pasha's part to escape a trial, he is sent to jail for two years. This decision leaves Pasha feeling betrayed. Due to the disapproval of their father over Sooraj and Radha's relationship, Dheeraj asks her to go to Paris, hoping the lovers could reunite once Sooraj is released from prison. To make this happen Dheeraj also lies to his family that he planned to set up a blind date between Radha and his old friend Ranvijay.

One and a half years later, the court reduces Sooraj's sentence on the grounds of good behaviour. Sooraj is out of jail and is ready to start a new life with Radha, but to live a life, he needed to earn. So he creates a fitness center for living with support from Radha and Dheeraj. All seemed to be going well until one day Dheeraj's wife, meets Ranvijay and brings him home. Dheeraj had been lying to his family that Radha and Ranvijay were a couple so that they wouldn't coerce Radha into a marriage she didn't like. Unbeknownst to the family, Ranvijay is a smuggler and a criminal, who strikes a deal with Pasha to separate Sooraj and Radha. Slowly he wins the approval of Radha's family and further turns them against Sooraj.

Shrikant decides to accept Ranvijay as his son-in-law and get enraged when he finds out that Radha and Sooraj were still a couple. Despite several attempts by the couple and Dheeraj, he remains stubborn about their relationship. Ranvijay uses this situation to break Radha's and Sooraj's love.

In a last ditch attempt to convince her father, Radha and Sooraj narrate their love story to Shrikant and Dheeraj about what happened in a musical theatre performance, but Shrikant still refuses to accept Sooraj due to his former life as a goon. Instead, he informs Dheeraj that he would be willing to consider their relationship only if Sooraj agrees to become a state witness and confesses against Pasha. When Dheeraj proposes this to Sooraj, he calmly rejects the offer stating that becoming a state witness against Pasha just to marry Radha is degrading to their love, moreover the adds that he is not willing to betray his father.

The same day. Ranvijay, waiting for the right opportunity, arrives after Dheeraj leaves and stabs Sooraj. In the morning, Pasha arrives intending to kill Sooraj for his betrayal, but Radha arrives at the scene and tells him that Sooraj would rather leave her and go to prison than betray Pasha. Pasha and Sooraj reconcile. However, Ranvijay still holds a grudge against Sooraj and kills Pasha's men. He tries to kill Pasha and Sooraj. A fight ensues, and Ranvijay is shot by Shrikant who arrives at the scene and finally chooses to accept Sooraj. Radha and Sooraj reunite and get married.

== Cast ==
- Sooraj Pancholi as Sooraj Kaushik, Radha's love interest and Pasha's son
- Athiya Shetty as Radha Mathur, Sooraj's love interest and Shrikant's daughter
- Aditya Pancholi as Suryakant 'Pasha' Ranade, Sooraj's father
- Tigmanshu Dhulia as IG Shrikant Mathur, Radha and Dheeraj's father
- Sharad Kelkar as Dheeraj Mathur, Radha's brother and Srikanth’s Son
- Anita Hassanandani as Ruchi Mathur, Dheeraj's wife and Shrikant’s Daughter in Law
- Vivan Bhatena as Ranvijay Shekhawat
- Chetan Hansraj as Changhezi
- Randeep Kumar Jha as Rathudi
- Anil Mange as Salim
- Trishaan as Gangu
- Ashish Verma as Mangesh
- Salman Khan in a special appearance in the music video of the song "Main Hoon Hero Tera"

== Production ==
In May 2013 it was announced that Subhash Ghai is all set to remake his 1983 blockbuster Hero, which will be re-edited and re-written. On 6 August 2013 it was announced that Nikhil Advani is all set to direct and re-write the script for the film, which Salman Khan is producing. On 19 September 2013, Khan announced the launch of his own production house Salman Khan Films, which was to debut with the remake, though the 2014 Canadian film Dr. Cabbie and the 2015 Kabir Khan-directed Indian film Bajrangi Bhaijaan actually marked Khan's production debut. On 7 January 2014, it was reported that Khan set the film to start production on 18 February, and the film would be released on 12 December 2014.

On 10 February 2014, it was reported that Ghai, who helmed the original, had approved the script re-written by Umesh Bist. Ghai said "I think they've done a fantastic job of contemporising my script to suit today's tastes".

=== Casting ===
On 14 August 2013 news told that Govinda and Vinod Khanna will also star in the remake film. On 25 October 2013 Ghai said "Yes, Salman may make a special appearance but he will primarily be working as the producer of the film" and he will be singing the title song of the film. On 9 February 2014 it was confirmed that Athiya Shetty will make her acting debut in the remake film opposite Sooraj Pancholi, another debutante. Pancholi's father Aditya Pancholi, a lead actor of the 1980s and 1990s, was also cast in the film.

=== Filming ===
On 19 September 2013 it was announced that both Pancholi and Shetty are currently undergoing training to start the film's production. On 7 January 2014 Khan set the film to start shooting on 18 February. Later Advani began the film's principal photography on 16 February 2014 at the Gateway of India.

== Reception ==
=== Box office ===
The film collected ₹2.45 crore (US$250,000) on its fifth day of release. The film collected a total of ₹30 crore (US$3.1 million) in its first week.

=== Critical reception ===
Mohar Bash from Times of India gave 3* to the film stating that "Sculpted as a full throttle masala entertainer, Hero is plot-heavy. And while you are well acquainted with the story, Nikhil and Salman's sensibility works as midas touch, giving the film a different texture. It is slick and never allows its viewers to feel restless. For its 132 minutes' crisp runtime." Bollywood Hungama gave 2/5* to the film stating that "On the whole, HERO fails the litmus test of rehashing a classic for the Generation Next. It appeals in very small measures and is not an ideal weekend entertainer. If you a die-hard Salman Khan fan, you may want to patronise, else avoid." Indian express gave 0/5* to the film stating that "This stale story is transported to 2015 for reasons best known to the filmmakers. If you are giving us a brand new pair, what is to stop you from giving us a brand new plot? And if you do have to remake that 80s show, why can't you do a better job?" Vishal Thakur of the Hindi daily Hindustan gave the film a 1.5/5 rating and criticised the film's plot and acting.

== Soundtrack ==
Hero

Soundtrack album by Amaal Mallik, Sachin–Jigar, Jassi Katyal and Meet Bros Anjjan
- Released: 14 August 2015
- Recorded: 2015
- Genre: Feature film soundtrack
- Length: 39:17
- Language: Hindi
- Label: T-Series
- Producer: Meghdeep Bose

The music for Hero is composed by Amaal Mallik, Meet Bros Anjjan and Sachin–Jigar with lyrics penned by Kumaar and Niranjan Iyengar. This was the first film where Advani had not worked with Shankar–Ehsaan–Loy, though they were involved at parallel with Advani's successive release, Katti Batti. The first song Main Hoon Hero Tera in Salman's voice, composed by Mallik and arranged & produced by Meghdeep Bose, was released on 9 August 2015 and it received more than 55 million views. The soundtrack was released on 14 August 2015 by T-Series.

Track listing
No.	Title	Lyrics	Music	Singer(s)	Length
1.	"Main Hoon Hero Tera"	Kumaar	Amaal Mallik	Salman Khan	04:44
2.	"Jab We Met"	Niranjan Iyengar	Sachin–Jigar	Rahul Pandey, Shalmali Kholgade, Divya Kumar, Jigar Saraiya	05:19
3.	"Main Hoon Hero Tera" (Reprise)	Kumaar	Amaal Mallik	Armaan Malik	04:44
4.	"Khoya Khoya"	Niranjan Iyengar	Sachin–Jigar	Mohit Chauhan, Priya Saraiya, Arpita Chakraborty, Tanishka Sanghvi	05:17
5.	"Yadaan Teriyaan (Version 1)"	Kumaar	Jassi Katyal	Rahat Fateh Ali Khan	05:04
6.	"Yadaan Teriyaan (Version 2)"	Kumaar	Jassi Katyal	Dev Negi, Shipra Goyal	05:02
7.	"Dance Ke Legend"	Kumaar	Meet Bros Anjjan	Meet Bros, Bhoomi Trivedi	04:00
8.	"O Khuda"	Kumaar	Amaal Mallik	Amaal Mallik, Palak Muchhal	05:07
Total length:					39:17

== Awards and nominations ==
Year	Award Ceremony	Category	Recipient(s) and nominee(s)	Result	Ref.
2015	Mirchi Music Awards	Upcoming Male Vocalist of The Year	Amaal Mallik – "O Khuda"	Nominated	
2015	Mirchi Music Awards	Upcoming Music Composer of The Year	Amaal Mallik – "Main Hoon Hero Tera (Salman Khan Version)"	Nominated	
