= VadFest =

Art and Culture Festival

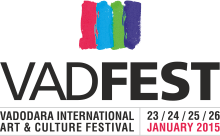
- VadFest - Vadodara International Art and Cultural Festival 2015
- Location: Vadodara, India
- Founded: 2015
- Festival date: 23–26 January 2015
- Website: vadfest.com

VadFest (Vadodara International Art and Culture Festival), organized by Art and Culture Foundation Vadodara under the aegis of Vadodara International Art and Culture Festival Authority, Government of Gujarat and Gujarat Tourism, is an initiative to promote and restore Vadodara as a cultural capital of India. It is one of India's biggest art and cultural festivals. Vadodara is famous for its rich heritage, fine arts, performing arts, iconic architecture, industrious nature and academic infrastructure. The first such festival was on 23–26 January 2015.

== VadFest 2015 ==
VadFest 2015 was an international art and culture festival held over four days (from January 23 to 26) 2015 during the Republic Day weekend. The festival featured performances and events in art, music, dance, theatre, food and children's events Attendees included non-resident Indians and visitors from 42 countries.

VadFest showcased a diverse array of performances, and artists across its program.

=== Garvi Gujarat Festival ===
- Sugam Sangeet (16-Jan-2015): Prahar Vora, Kalyani Kauthalkar, Bhaumik Trivedi, Aanal Vasavada
- Gujju Rocks (16-Jan-2015): Parthiv Gohil, Bhoomi Trivedi
- Lok Nritya (17-Jan-2015): Dang Tribal dance, Katchchi dance and Saurashtra dance
- Lok Dayro (17-Jan-2015): Sairam Dave, Shahbuddin Rathod, Abhesinh Rathod, Farida Mir, Suraj Mir, Chand Mir, Arvind Barot
- Shaam-e-Mushayra (18-Jan-2015): Rahat Indori, Khalil Dhantejvi, Rajendra Shukla, Shobhit Desai
- Shaam-e-Ghazal (18-Jan-2015): Manhar Udhas
- Vadodara Day (19-Jan-2015): Achal Mehta, Ashit Desai, Garima Khiste, Gautam Dabir, Dr Kirti Sahay, Megha Bhosle, Sanat Pandya

=== Main Events ===
- Live-in-concerts: Yanni along with his daughter Krystal, A R Rahman, Sunidhi Chauhan, Sonu Nigam, Kailash Kher
- Music: Flute by Pandit Hariprasad Chaurasia, Sivamani Trio, Rahul Sharma & Buddy Wells
- Theatre: Anupam Kher, Sharman Joshi, Paresh Rawal
- Dance: Shiva Shakti by Isha Sharvani, Geeta Chandran
- VadMasters: Zoya Akhtar, Homi Adajania, Makarand Deshpande and Sriram Raghavan moderated by Rajesh Mapuskar
- Vintage Car show
- Fine Arts
- Food Festival: Royal cuisine
- Drum Circle: 10,000 school children would create a symphony from the drum beats as to uphold the idea of ‘Swaach Bharat’ mission on 23-Jan-15.
- Garvi Gujarat: Geodesic Craft dome shell structure, 2015 cm (66 running ft) Pithora Painting’s Live Demonstration, More than 40 National Award Winning Artisans, Live Demonstration of Handicraft & Handloom in Craft Village, Tribal Museum, Handicraft & Handloom Exhibition, Craft Theme Pavilion

=== Venues ===
- Sir Sayajirao Nagar Gruh
- Luxmi Vilas Palace
- Gandhinagar Gruh
- FGI Auditorium
- Navlakhi ground
- Polo ground
- The M S University pavilion
- Prof C C Mehta general auditorium
- Mayfair Atrium
- Fine Arts College, The M S University of Baroda
- Kirti Mandir
- Gulab Baug
- Samta Ground, Subhanpura, Vadodara
- Inox, Race course circle
- SAMTA GROUND

=== Artists and Event Show line-up ===
Line up on 23rd Jan	Line up on 24th Jan	Line up on 25th Jan	Line up on 26th Jan
Yanni	Sunidhi Chauhan & Kailash Kher	Sonu Nigam	A.R Rahman
Pt. Hairprasad Chaurasia	Rahul Sharma & Buddy Wells	Between the lines	Golf
Blame it on yashraj	Raju Raja Ram aur Main	Kishan Vs Kanhaiya	Sivamani Trio
Chapa kata	Mareez	Garvi Gurjari	kuch bhi ho sakta hai
Garvi Gurjari	Garvi Gurjari	Magnificent '7'	Chanakya
Magnificent '7'	Magnificent '7'	Path Finders	Garvi Gurjari
Path Finders	Path Finders	Indian Contemporary	Magnificent '7'
Indian Contemporary	Indian Contemporary	Baroda Chronicles	Path Finders
Baroda Chronicles	Baroda Chronicles	Back to College	Indian Contemporary
Back to College	Back to College	Art Pop-up	Baroda Chronicles
Art Pop-up	Art Pop-up	Gavin Turk & Donald Woodman	Back to College
Gavin Turk & Donald Woodman	Gavin Turk & Donald Woodman	Vintage Vadodara	Art Pop-up
Vintage Vadodara	Vintage Vadodara	Papyrus Indic the paper show	Gavin Turk & Donald Woodman
Papyrus Indic the paper show	Papyrus Indic the paper show	Drama Workshop	Vintage Vadodara
Isha Sharvani	Beauty and the Beast	Street Food and Royal Cuisine	Geeta Chandran
Snow white & the 7 dwarfs		Vintage Car Show	The Story Of Diwali
Street Food and Royal Cuisine			Street Food and Royal Cuisine
			Papyrus Indic the paper show
			Vintage Car Show

=== Controversies ===
Three BJP MLAs had decided to stay away from VadFest quoting they have not received invitation of Garvi Gujarat festival. Later it was resolved.

== See also ==
- Vadodara
- Baroda State
- Vadodara district
- Cultural Festival in India
