= Saudagar (1991 film) =

1991 Indian Hindi drama film

- Film poster
- Directed by: Subhash Ghai
- Written by: Sachin Bhowmick; Subhash Ghai; Kamlesh Pandey
- Produced by: Subhash Ghai
- Starring: Dilip Kumar; Raaj Kumar; Manisha Koirala; Vivek Mushran; Amrish Puri; Mukesh Khanna; Gulshan Grover; Anupam Kher; Jackie Shroff
- Cinematography: Ashok Mehta
- Edited by: Waman Bhonsle; Gurudutt Shirali
- Music by: Laxmikant–Pyarelal
- Distributed by: Mukta Arts
- Release date: 9 August 1991 (India)
- Running time: 201 min
- Country: India
- Language: Hindi
- Box office: ₹15.75 crore (equivalent to ₹148 crore or US$15 million in 2026)

Saudagar (transl. Merchant) is a 1991 Indian Hindi-language action drama film, directed by Subhash Ghai. It stars Dilip Kumar and Raaj Kumar, the two acting giants of Hindi cinema in lead roles. It was the second film in which the two actors came together after the 1959 film Paigham. It featured the debut performances of Vivek Mushran and Manisha Koirala, the latter becoming a noted Bollywood actress in later years. Amrish Puri, Anupam Kher, Mukesh Khanna, Dalip Tahil, Gulshan Grover, Dina Pathak, Deepti Naval and Jackie Shroff star in key roles.

The story line is influenced by Romeo and Juliet and Mandhaari's role is parallel to that of Friar Laurence in Romeo and Juliet. It was also inspired by the 1985 Pakistani Punjabi movie Haq Mehar.

Saudagar was a silver jubilee hit all over India and the third highest grossing Indian film of 1991. It features among the top 10 grossers of the 1990s. Saudagar received eight nominations at the 37th Filmfare Awards, and won two awards including Best Director for Subhash Ghai. It was Dilip Kumar's penultimate film and final box office success.

== Plot ==
The movie starts with Mandhari, an old crippled man, telling a story of two friends to some kids. In the story, Rajeshwar Singh, a rich landlord's son, and Veer Singh, a poor farmer's son, become friends. They are naughty kids, calling each other as Raju and Veeru respectively. As the duo grow up, Raju decides to get his sister Palikanta's marriage arranged with Veeru. Neither his sister nor Veeru have any objections to the marriage.

However, as luck would have it, a girl's marriage in town is disrupted due to her in-laws demanding dowry. Veeru steps in to save the face of the girl and her parents by marrying her. While Raju is shocked by this development, his sister, who was secretly in love with Veeru, commits suicide. Devastated and distraught, Raju now declares that Veeru is solely responsible for everything that happened, making him his mortal enemy.

With these new developments, the duo has their territories marked. They come to an uneasy and unwritten truce: no one will kill a living soul from the other's territory, but anybody entering the other person's territory will be doing so at their own peril. Chuniya, kin of Raju, sees an opportunity to leech off the money of Rajeshwar by keeping the two sides at war. Chuniya has Veer's son Vishal killed, making the latter believe that Rajeshwar will stop at nothing to eliminate Veer.

Over the years, the tension escalates. The clashes between the former friends becomes a headache for the Police Commissioner. Mandhari, who is now revealed to be a beggar and part of the story, happens to be one of the lucky few who do not have any fear of death from either side. Mandhari claims to the Police Commissioner that the day he finds out a solution to the problem, he will dance on one leg.

Here, Rajeshwar's granddaughter Radha and Veer's grandson Vasu meet each other. Radha and Vasu are unaware of the enmity and fall in love. When Mandhari finds out about this, he happily completes his pledge to himself and reveals the truth to the lovers. However, Chuniya decides to stoke the fires once again, which he does by abducting, raping and killing a girl named Amla from Veer's territory. Because Rajeshwar's grandson, Kunal, had secretly married and impregnated Amla, the tensions arise further between the two clans.

Mandhaari reveals his plans to end their grandfathers' enmity, according to which Radha will infiltrate Veer's home, while Vasu will infiltrate Rajeshwar's. The lovers succeed in doing so and try to make the old friends see reason. Aarti, Vishal's widow, learns the true identity of Radha but keeps quiet.

Meanwhile, Chuniya has completely infiltrated Rajeshwar's bastion. He starts making murky deals with shady parties who are interested in acquiring the whole region. Chuniya exposes the lovers as well. Radha and Vasu's pleas fall on deaf ears. However, Chuniya's luck does not last long. The people with whom Chuniya had dealt with attack Rajeshwar, exposing Chuniya's real face. A distraught Rajeshwar and a sympathetic Veer finally sort out their enmity of decades. Here, Chuniya grows desperate and has Radha and Vasu captured, and Radha's uncle Deven killed.

The people from both sides unite to fight against Chuniya; Veeru and Raju's surviving sons, Gagan and Gajja, respectively, are killed in the fight. Soon, Radha and Vasu are saved, but are unaware of the fact that their grandfathers have reconciled. Veeru and Raju kill Chuniya but get fatally wounded themselves. As the friends die in each other's arms, the final chapter on this friendship and enmity is closed.

The story cuts to the present, revealing that Radha and Vasu got married and they formed a trust in the name of their grandparents, which takes care of the education of the children Mandhari is retelling the story to. Radha and Vasu inaugurate the school as Aarti looks on.

== Cast ==
- Dilip Kumar as Veer Singh ("Dada Veer"/"Veeru")
- Raaj Kumar as Thakur Rajeshwar Singh ("Dada Thakur"/"Raju")
- Jackie Shroff as Vishal Singh, Veer's elder son (special appearance)
- Manisha Koirala as Radha Singh Thakur
- Vivek Mushran as Vasudev Singh ("Vasu"/"Krishna")
- Deepti Naval as Aarti Singh, Vishal's wife
- Amrish Puri as Chuniya Chand Chaukhan
- Anupam Kher as Mandhaari
- Gulshan Grover as Baliram
- Dalip Tahil as Gajendra Singh Thakur ("Gajja"), Rajeshwar's son, and Radha and Kunal's father
- Anand Balraj as Devendra Singh Thakur ("Deven"), Rajeshwar's son
- Dina Pathak as Veer's sister
- Zahid Ali as Young Veer Singh
- Ved Thappar as Young Rajeshwar Singh
- Rubina Khan as Palikanta Singh Thakur, Rajeshwar's sister
- Malvika Tiwari as Rajeshwar's wife
- Abhinav Chaturvedi as Kunal Singh Thakur, Radha's brother
- Pallavi Joshi as Amla Singh Thakur, Kunal's wife
- Akash Khurana as Police Commissioner
- Mukesh Khanna as Gagan Singh, Veer's younger son
- Archana Puran Singh (cameo)
- Shubha Khote (cameo)
- Govind Namdev (cameo)

== Soundtrack ==
The music for the film was composed by the legendary duo of Laxmikant–Pyarelal, and the lyrics were written by Anand Bakshi.

No.	Title	Singer(s)	Length
1.	"Ilu Ilu"	Kavita Krishnamurthy, Udit Narayan, Sukhwinder Singh, Manhar Udhas	10:04
2.	"Imli Ka Boota (Part 1)"	Mohammed Aziz, Sudesh Bhosle	05:01
3.	"Imli Ka Boota (Part 2)"	Sadhana Sargam, Mohammed Aziz, Udit Narayan	04:23
4.	"Saudagar Sauda Kar"	Kavita Krishnamurthy, Sukhwinder Singh, Manhar Udhas	07:54
5.	"Radha Nachegi"	Lata Mangeshkar, Mohammed Aziz	06:50
6.	"Mohabbat Ki Ki"	Kavita Krishnamurthy, Suresh Wadkar	05:33
7.	"Deewane Tere Naam Ke"	Sukhwinder Singh	04:17
8.	"Teri Yaad Aati Hain"	Lata Mangeshkar, Suresh Wadkar	06:41
Total length:			50:43

== Awards ==
Award	Category	Recipients and nominees	Results
37th Filmfare Awards	Best Film	Subhash Ghai	Nominated
37th Filmfare Awards	Best Director	Subhash Ghai	Won
37th Filmfare Awards	Best Actor	Dilip Kumar	Nominated
37th Filmfare Awards	Best Supporting Actor	Anupam Kher	Nominated
37th Filmfare Awards	Best Villain	Amrish Puri	Nominated
37th Filmfare Awards	Best Female Debut	Manisha Koirala	Nominated
37th Filmfare Awards	Best Music Director	Laxmikant–Pyarelal	Nominated
37th Filmfare Awards	Best Female Playback Singer	Kavita Krishnamurthy for "Saudagar Sauda Kar"	Nominated
37th Filmfare Awards	Best Editing	Waman Bhonsle, Gurudutt Shirali	Won
