= Black & White (2008 Hindi film) =

2008 Indian crime thriller film

- Movie poster
- Directed by: Subhash Ghai
- Written by: Sachin Bhowmick; Subhash Ghai; Akash Khurana
- Produced by: Raju Farooqui; Mukta Ghai; Subhash Ghai; Rahul Puri
- Starring: Anil Kapoor; Anurag Sinha; Shefali Shah; Aditi Sharma
- Cinematography: Somak Mukherjee
- Edited by: Amitabh Shukla
- Music by: Sukhwinder Singh
- Production company: Mukta Searchlight Films
- Distributed by: Eros International
- Release date: 7 March 2008
- Running time: 138 mins
- Country: India
- Language: Hindi

Black & White is a 2008 Indian crime thriller film co-produced and directed by Subhash Ghai. The film stars Anil Kapoor, Anurag Sinha, Shefali Shah, and Aditi Sharma. The film explores the life of an Afghan suicide bomber, played by Anurag Sinha, who is sent on a mission on Indian Independence Day. It was said to be based on the 2005 American film The War Within but Ghai himself says that the inspiration was instead another film , released earlier in 1997, The Devil's Own. Upon release, the film received wide critical acclaim along with a nomination for Best Debut (Male) for Anurag Sinha at the 54th Filmfare Awards. The film premiered at the International Film Festivals of Pune and Delhi.

== Plot ==
Rajan Mathur is an Urdu professor who lives in Chandni Chowk district in New Delhi, with his wife Roma Mathur , who is a social activist and feminist, and their young daughter.

Professor Mathur meets Numair Qazi, who informs him that he is a victim of communal riots in Gujarat. He is actually a suicide bomber of an Islamic fundamentalist group who has been ordered to set off a bomb near Red Fort during the Independence day celebrations.

Numair wins the trust of the professor and his wife. While assisting Numair to get an entry pass for the celebrations at Red Fort, Professor Mathur introduces him to people living in harmony in Chandni Chowk regardless of faith.

Numair is no longer sure if he should carry out the orders of his superiors or not. Although he is a deep-rooted fundamentalist, he sees this area as colourful and loving. There is no black and white. Nonetheless, he goes forward to accomplish his mission.

== Cast ==
- Anil Kapoor as Rajan Mathur, An Urdu Professor
- Anurag Sinha as Numair Qazi
- Habib Tanvir as Gaffar Bhai, Qazi Saab
- Shefali Shah as Roma Mathur
- Aditi Sharma as Shagufta
- Sai Tamhankar as Nimmo
- Arun Bakshi as Naeem Shaikh
- Milind Gunaji as Hamid
- Nawazuddin Siddiqui as Tahir Tayyabuddin
- Mushtaq Khan as Mohanlal Agarwal
- Akash Khurana as Waajir Sahab
- Vikrant Chaturvedi as Intelligence chief
- Saurabh Dubey

== Music ==
Song	Singer(s)	Duration
"Haq Allah"	Sukhwinder Singh & Hans Raj Hans	5:33
"Peer Manava"	Sukhwinder Singh & Shraddha Pandit	4:16
"Yeh Hindustan Hai" (Part 1)	Jagjit Singh	5:02
"Main Chali"	Shreya Ghoshal	6:18
"Main Chala"	Sukhwinder Singh	5:43
"Jogi Aaya"	Sukhwinder Singh & Sadhana Sargam	4:49
"Yeh Hindustan Hai" (Part 2)	Udit Narayan	5:02

== Reception ==
Raja Sen of Rediff.com gave the film three out of five, "This is a film of urgency, make no mistake, and both protagonist and screenplay talk only as much as is required. As for the director himself, he doesn't even make the obligatory cameo. It is the sentiment that plays hero."

== Awards and nominations ==
Filmfare Awards

Year	Category	Role	Film	Result	Ref.
2009	Best Male Debut	Anurag Sinha	Black & White	Nominated	
