= Ram Lakhan =

1989 Indian film by Subhash Ghai

- Theatrical release poster
- Directed by: Subhash Ghai
- Written by: Anwar Khan
- Screenplay by: Ram Kelkar
- Produced by: Ashok Ghai
- Starring: Raakhee; Jackie Shroff; Anil Kapoor; Dimple Kapadia; Madhuri Dixit; Amrish Puri; Paresh Rawal; Anupam Kher
- Cinematography: Ashok Mehta
- Edited by: Waman Bhonsle; Gurudutt Shirali
- Music by: Laxmikant–Pyarelal; Anand Bakshi (lyrics)
- Production company: Suneha Arts
- Distributed by: Mukta Arts
- Release date: 27 January 1989
- Running time: 174 minutes
- Country: India
- Language: Hindi
- Budget: ₹2.83 crore
- Box office: est. ₹18 crore

Ram Lakhan is a 1989 Indian Hindi-language action masala film directed by Subhash Ghai and written by Anwar Khan with screenplay by Ram Kelkar. Ram Lakhan stars an ensemble cast of Raakhee, Jackie Shroff, Anil Kapoor, Dimple Kapadia, Madhuri Dixit, Amrish Puri, Paresh Rawal, and Anupam Kher in lead roles. The supporting cast includes Gulshan Grover, Saeed Jaffrey and Satish Kaushik. Music of the film was by Laxmikant–Pyarelal, while Anand Bakshi penned the lyrics. Ghai also did a special appearance in the song "Tera Naam Liya Tujhe Yaad Kiya".

Made on a budget of ₹28.3 million (US$290,000) including production and marketing costs, Ram Lakhan was released theatrically on 27 January 1989 on the Republic Day weekend. The film emerged as a major critical and commercial success and earned ₹180 million (US$1.9 million) worldwide, becoming the second highest grossing Bollywood film of 1989. Considered as Ghai's best work till date, Ram Lakhan has attained a cult classic status over the years and is still remembered for its cast, direction and soundtrack. Kapoor's performance as Lakhan was much loved and is regarded as one of his best roles; the song "My Name Is Lakhan" filmed on him has become his trademark and signature song.

At the 35th Filmfare Awards, Ram Lakhan received 9 nominations, including Best Film, Best Director (Ghai) and Best Music Director (Laxmikant–Pyarelal), and won 2 awards – Best Supporting Actress (Raakhee) and Best Comedian (for both Kher and Kaushik).

== Plot ==
Sharda is happily married to the rich and benevolent Thakur Pratap Singh. The couple has two young sons, Ram and Lakhan. Pratap's father, Veer Singh, shows mercy to his nephews, Bhishambar and Bhanu, after they serve jail time for siphoning the family wealth. Veer Singh is tricked into signing a will that deprives Pratap, Sharda, Ram, and Lakhan of the family wealth and right to live in their ancestral manor.

Veer Singh is then killed by a car explosion. Pratap refuses to bow down to the cruel Bhishambar after finding out their master plan. He is later severely beaten up, brutally stabbed, and left on a nearby railway track to be cut into pieces by the next passing train, leaving behind Sharda, Ram, and Lakhan. Sharda vows to avenge Pratap’s death and hopes to get it by visiting the temple every day and praying for justice. She talks about when her sons grow up and ultimately destroy Pratap’s assailants, and it is then and only then that she will disperse Pratap's ashes.

=== 20 years later ===
Ram, now a police inspector, becomes a major obstacle in Bhishambar's illegal activities. He is in love with Geeta, the daughter of Police Commissioner Arun Kashyap. Lakhan is the fun-loving, precocious young man, still living under Ram's shadow and Sharda's love. When Lakhan finds out there is a big reward for the arrest of notorious gangster Kesariya Vilayti, he single-handedly captures him and claims the reward.

Thinking police work is quite easy, Lakhan applies for the job, begins training, and eventually becomes an inspector too. He too seeks to use his new job to woo his childhood sweetheart, Radha, and deal with her stingy, eccentric but easily fooled father, Deodhar Shastri. Sharda heads on a religious pilgrimage, and when she returns, she finds that Ram and Lakhan have quarreled and no longer speak with each other based on their ideological differences.

Lakhan uses his power to make extra money in an attempt to raise his clout so he can take revenge against Bishamber and Bhanu. While Ram creates obstacles for Bhishambar, Lakhan joins his gang and is on their payroll. However, after he is tricked by Bhishamber and the ruthless gangster, Sir John, Ram has to come to terms and save his brother and finish what was once started. As the duo fight their enemies, Bishamber is pushed down by Lakhan, and the coming train cuts him off, as Thakur was pushed down and killed in the same way, and Bhanu is shot down.

== Cast ==
- Jackie Shroff as Inspector Ram Pratap Singh: Sharda and Thakur Pratap’s elder son; Lakhan's elder brother; Geeta's lover
- Anil Kapoor as Sub-Inspector Lakhan Pratap Singh: Sharda and Thakur Pratap’s younger son; Ram's younger brother; Radha's lover
- Raakhee as Sharda Pratap Singh: Thakur Pratap’s wife; Ram and Lakhan's mother
- Dimple Kapadia as Geeta Kashyap: Arun's daughter; Ram's lover
- Madhuri Dixit as Radha Shastri: Devdhar's daughter; Lakhan's lover
- Amrish Puri as Bhishambar Nath: Thakur Pratap’s cousin; Bhanu's elder brother; Nirmala's husband
- Gulshan Grover as Kesariya Vilayati / Badman
- Paresh Rawal as Bhanu Nath: Thakur Pratap’s cousin; Bhishambar's younger brother
- Anupam Kher as Devdhar Shastri: Radha's father
- Saeed Jaffrey as Arun Kashyap: Geeta's father
- Raza Murad as Sir John: Bhishambar, Bhanu and Kesariya’s boss
- Dalip Tahil as Thakur Pratap Singh: Veer's son; Bhishambar and Bhanu's cousin; Sharda's husband; Ram and Lakhan's father
- Annu Kapoor as Shivcharan Mathur
- Anirudh Agarwal as Jeeva
- Sonika Gill as Vivia
- Anand Balraj as Debrath Nath / Debu
- Mukri as Dhondu Nai
- Lalita Kumari as Parmeshwari Bhishambar Nath: Bhishambar's wife
- Subhash Ghai as Manmohan Mhatre (special appearance in song "Tera Naam Liya Tujhe Yaad Kiya")
- Satish Kaushik as Kanshiram Dey
- Lahiri Singh as Veer Pratap Singh: Thakur Pratap’s father; Sharda's father-in-law; Bhishambar and Bhanu's uncle; Ram and Lakhan's grandfather
- Mukesh Rawal as Mukund Trivedi: Lakhan's friend

== Track list ==
The soundtrack was composed by Laxmikant–Pyarelal and the lyrics written by Anand Bakshi. The songs were extremely popular and remain popular even today. The catchy numbers like "My Name Is Lakhan" and "tera naam liya, tujhe yaad kiya" were playing almost in every street in Northern India, the album also includes melodious and soulful tracks like "O Ram ji! bada dukh deena" with mythological connotations and the title track "mere do Anmol Ratan" .

#	Title	Singer(s)	Raga	Length
1	"My Name Is Lakhan"	Mohammed Aziz, Anuradha Paudwal, Nitin Mukesh		07:10
2	"Tera Naam Liya"	Manhar Udhas, Anuradha Paudwal		05:58
3	"Main Hoon Hero"	Mohammed Aziz, Amit Kumar, Alisha Chinai		09:07
4	"Bada Dukh Dina O Ramji"	Lata Mangeshkar	Yaman Kalyan	06:04
5	"Mere Do Anmol Ratan" – Version 1	Mohammed Aziz, Kavita Krishnamurthy		05:17
6	"Bekhabar Bewafa"	Anuradha Paudwal	Shivaranjani	10:00
7	"Mere Do Anmol Ratan" – Version 2	Kavita Krishnamurthy, Mohammed Aziz		2:30

== Awards ==
35th Filmfare Awards:

Won

- Best Supporting Actress – Raakhee
- Best Comedian – Anupam Kher and Satish Kaushik (tie)

Nominated

- Best Film – Ashok Ghai
- Best Director – Subhash Ghai
- Best Music Director – Laxmikant Pyarelal
- Best Male Playback Singer – Mohammed Aziz – "My Name is Lakhan"
- Best Female Playback Singer – Anuradha Paudwal for "Bekhabar Bewafa"
- Best Female Playback Singer – Anuradha Paudwal for "Tera Naam Liya"
