= Iqbal (film) =

2005 Indian sports drama film

- Theatrical release poster
- Directed by: Nagesh Kukunoor
- Written by: Nagesh Kukunoor; Mir Ali Hussain (dialogues)
- Produced by: Subhash Ghai
- Starring: Shreyas Talpade; Naseeruddin Shah; Girish Karnad; Shweta Basu Prasad; Yatin Karyekar; Prateeksha Lonkar
- Cinematography: Sudeep Chatterjee
- Edited by: Sanjib Datta
- Music by: Songs: Himesh Reshammiya; Salim–Sulaiman; Sukhwinder Singh; Om The Fusion Band; Kedar–Sarosh; Score: Salim–Sulaiman
- Distributed by: Mukta Searchlight Films
- Release date: 26 August 2005
- Running time: 132 minutes
- Country: India
- Language: Hindi
- Budget: ₹2.25 crore
- Box office: ₹5.60 crore

Iqbal is a 2005 Indian Hindi-language coming-of-age sports drama film directed and co-written by Nagesh Kukunoor. Produced by Subhash Ghai under Mukta Searchlight Films, the story follows a cricket-obsessed deaf and mute boy from a remote Indian village as he aims to overcome difficulties to become a cricketer and fulfill his dream of playing for the Indian national cricket team. The film received the National Film Award for Best Film on Other Social Issues.

The film was screened retrospectively on 18 August 2016 at the Independence Day Film Festival jointly presented by the Indian Directorate of Film Festivals and the Ministry of Defense, commemorating the 70th Indian Independence Day.

== Plot ==
Iqbal is a deaf and mute boy who dreams of playing cricket for India. However, he is discouraged by his father, who thinks that Iqbal's daydreams are a waste of time. Instead, he wants Iqbal to help him tend to the crops and become a farmer like him, which would be a stable profession.

Iqbal's sister, Khadija, however, helps him try out for a nearby academy run by Guruji, an influential former India captain, who accepts him for his talent. However, when Iqbal competes with a rich boy, Kamal, who is also the star of the academy, he is thrown out by Guruji out of fear of Kamal's father, who bankrolls the academy. Iqbal seeks help from the local drunkard, Mohit, who was once a great cricketer, and persuades him to be his coach. They are able to train in a nearby field, using Iqbal's buffaloes (named after actual members of the Indian cricket team) as fielders.

Mohit trains Iqbal and gets him a place on the Andhra Pradesh Ranji Trophy team, despite the fact that Iqbal has no previous cricketing experience. Iqbal plays marvelously for the team, which was a weak team before he joined, and is soon noticed by the press and cricket selectors alike. However, when the final match of the season pits Iqbal against his rival, Kamal, Guruji tries to bribe Iqbal to bowl badly so that the national team scouts at the game would select Kamal for the national cricket team.

Iqbal succumbs to his offer out of concern for his father, who is facing financial difficulties and may lose his lands. Luckily, a sports agent is able to offer him a better deal, and Iqbal bowls with his usual fiery pace and wins the match for his team. Surprisingly, he also impresses the onlooking national team selector, Kapil Dev (in a special guest role), and wins a place in the Indian national cricket team.

In the end, Iqbal is shown donning the Indian Cricket Team's blue jersey and walking in the ground to make his international debut.

== Cast ==
- Shreyas Talpade as Iqbal Saeed Khan
- Shweta Basu Prasad as Khadija Saeed Khan, Iqbal's younger sister
- Naseeruddin Shah as Mohit Mishra
- Girish Karnad as "Guruji"
- Yatin Karyekar as Anwar Saeed Khan
- Prateeksha Lonkar as Saida Saeed Khan
- Dilip Salgaonkar as Bipin
- Jyoti Joshi as Farida
- Adarsh Balakrishna as Kamal
- Gururaj Manepalli as Akash
- D. Santosh as Satish Bhatawdekar
- Kapil Dev as himself (Special Appearance)

== Reception ==
Vinayak Chakraborty of Hindustan Times found the movie to be Kukunoor's best work, and was favorable of Talpade and Shah's performances, noting that the former "achieves what many seasoned actors often fail to do — he makes you forget it’s actually an act." Agreeing with Chakraborty, Sudhish Kamath of The Hindu wrote that "every frame oozes inspiration, every scene comes alive with candid ingenuity," and called Talpade "the find of the year." The success of the film ensured its director Nagesh Kukunoor the commercial recognition. The film was voted amongst the Ten Hindi Films that is ideal for Training and Motivational material.

== Awards and nominations ==
=== 51st Filmfare Awards ===
==== Nominated ====
- Best Director – Nagesh Kukunoor
- Best Supporting Actor – Naseeruddin Shah
- Best Supporting Actress – Shweta Basu Prasad

==== Other awards ====
- National Film Award for Best Film on Other Social Issues – Nagesh Kukunoor & Subhash Ghai
- National Film Award for Best Supporting Actor – Naseeruddin Shah
- Zee Cine Award for Best Actor (Critics) – Male – Shreyas Talpade
- Zee Cine Award for Best Actor (Critics) - Female – Shweta Prasad
- Screen Award for Best Supporting Actress – Shweta Prasad

== Music ==
The music for the soundtrack was composed by Himesh Reshammiya, Salim–Sulaiman, Sukhwinder Singh, Om The Fusion Band and Kedar–Sarosh and was released under the Tips Industries label.

Iqbal

Soundtrack album by Himesh Reshammiya, Salim–Sulaiman, Sukhwinder Singh, Om The Fashion Band, Kedar–Sarosh
- Released: 2005
- Genre: Feature film soundtrack
- Label: Tips Music

No.	Title	Lyrics	Music	Singer(s)	Length
1.	"Aankhon Mein Sapna"	Sameer	Himesh Reshammiya	Ravindra Upadhyay	4:06
2.	"Aashayein"	Irfan Siddique	Salim–Sulaiman	KK, Salim Merchant	4:20
3.	"Aashayein" (Slow Version)	Irfan Siddique	Salim–Sulaiman	KK	1:12
4.	"Rogura"	Irfan Siddique	Salim–Sulaiman	KK, Salim Merchant	3:20
5.	"Khelenge Khelenge"	Subhash Ghai	Sukhwinder Singh	Sukhwinder Singh	4:54
6.	"Maula"	Indraneel	Om The Fusion Band	Shriram Iyer	5:19
7.	"Mutthi Mein Aasman"	Vimal Kashyap	Kedar–Sarosh	KK	5:58
8.	"Paani"	Subhash Ghai	Sukhwinder Singh	Suresh Wadkar, Sukhwinder Singh, Shweta Pandit	4:26
9.	"Tum Tana"	Indraneel	Om The Fusion Band	Shriram Iyer	4:18

== See also ==
- List of films featuring the deaf and hard of hearing
- Cricket in film and television
