= Yaadein (2001 film) =

2001 film by Subhash Ghai

- Poster
- Directed by: Subhash Ghai
- Screenplay by: Subhash Ghai; Anuradha Tiwari; Aatish Kapadia
- Story by: Subhash Ghai
- Produced by: Subhash Ghai
- Starring: Jackie Shroff; Hrithik Roshan; Kareena Kapoor; Amrish Puri
- Cinematography: Kabir Lal; Johny Lal
- Edited by: Subhash Ghai
- Music by: Anu Malik
- Distributed by: Mukta Arts
- Release date: 27 June 2001
- Running time: 180 minutes
- Country: India
- Language: Hindi
- Budget: est. ₹20 crore
- Box office: est. ₹34.59 crore

Yaadein (transl. Memories) is a 2001 Indian Hindi-language musical drama film written, directed, edited and produced by Subhash Ghai. The film stars Hrithik Roshan, Kareena Kapoor, Jackie Shroff and Amrish Puri. The film was released worldwide on 27 June 2001 to negative reviews and was a box office disappointment. Jackie Shroff received a nomination for the Filmfare Award for Best Supporting Actor at the 47th Filmfare Awards. Despite its box office failure, the film was profitable due to ancillary revenues of ₹21 crore, including ₹8.2 crore from selling music rights to Tips Industries.

Filming took place across several locations in the UK, Udaipur, Panchkula and Malaysia.

== Plot ==
Raj Singh Puri (Jackie Shroff) is the best friend of Lalit Kumar Malhotra (Anang Desai), the younger brother of Jagdish Kumar Malhotra (Amrish Puri). The Malhotras are wealthy business tycoons in London. Lalit and his wife Nalini's (Supriya Karnik) busy lifestyles have little time for their son, Ronit (Hrithik Roshan), who opposes his family's greed and wants a simpler life since his childhood comes to regard his "uncle" Raj and late "aunt" Shalini as his adoptive parents. Raj's wife, Shalini (Rati Agnihotri), died in an accident some years prior, leaving Raj to raise their three daughters alone. Ronit has maintained close friendships with Raj and his daughters (particularly the youngest Isha), having grown up with them. Meanwhile, Ronit who was always disinterested to join the family business, opens his own successful website for finding friends and prospective matches with his group.

After settling back to India; Raj's eldest daughter, Avantika, is happy in her arranged marriage to Ronit's college friend, Pankaj; his second daughter, Saania, marries her boyfriend Sukant against Raj's advice, and despite stark differences in family values and upbringing. Isha (Kareena Kapoor), the youngest and most strong-willed one, claims that she does not believe in love. After a few weeks of living with her in-laws and bearing their taunts and abuse even after Raj fulfilling all of their dowry demands, Saania returns home begging for a divorce but eventually reconciles with Sukant after he secures a job at Malhotras and the Puri family along with Pankaj and Sukant moves back to London.

Meanwhile, Isha and Ronit attend a cycling event in Malaysia as a contestant and news reporter respectively where Isha gets jealous seeing Ronit's friendship with a fellow cyclist and this jealousy leads her to win the race. Isha goes to a neighbouring island for a short trip with her friends followed by Ronit's group for their safety. There Isha gets stuck and falls unconscious out of panic after a crocodile attack and gets saved by Ronit but during escape the boat's engine fails leaving Ronit to save a still unconscious Isha while swimming across the ocean for many hours as the last option which keeps his own life at peril and both gets hospitalized as Ronit suffered shortage of oxygen in his lungs for a longer duration while Isha remaining unconscious by panic all along. After recovering they both realise that their friendship has blossomed into love. Neither are aware that back in London, Ronit's parents are secretly arranging for him to marry Monishka Rai (Kiran Rathod), the spoiled daughter of another business tycoon, in order to create a business merger between the two wealthy families. With Raj being a longtime friend of the Rai family, the Malhotras ask Raj to help them facilitate the marriage proposal. Raj agrees, the Malhotras having misled him to believe that Ronit would be happy with the marriage.

Raj is shocked when Isha asks for his blessing to marry Ronit, his loyalties to the Malhotra and Rai families making him feel guilty. Overcome with emotion, he ends up injuring himself in an accident, upsetting Isha and her giving up on her feelings by claiming it to be her and Ronit's "prank". Though sympathetic to Isha's feelings, Raj informs her of Ronit's planned engagement and explains that she would never find acceptance as a daughter-in-law in the Malhotra family, due to their obsession with money. Isha then ends her relationship with Ronit and pretends that she loves Ronit only as a friend, although doing so deeply hurts her. Ronit, heartbroken and angry, is pressured by both Raj and his parents to marry Monishka. Bitterly agreeing to the engagement, Ronit soon discovers that Monishka and her parents' lifestyles are totally opposite to the Malhotras' own traditional Indian values; after proving this to Raj, Raj begs the Malhotras to reconsider the engagement. This culminates in Jagdish publicly insulting Raj, and accusing him of using Isha to worm his way into their wealthy family. Shattered, Raj ends his relationship with the Malhotras including Ronit.

On the eve of the engagement party, during which the Malhotras and Rais plan to announce their business merger, Ronit lashes out at his parents for their lifelong neglect of his feelings and flees his home by injuring himself due to his home arrest by Jagdish. After fleeing he reaches Puri's home where Avantika asks Isha to meet him seeing him injured and they elope after reconciling, sending the Malhotras into a panic. Nalini is the first to understand Ronit's plight and apologizes to Raj, who convinces Ronit and Isha to return home. With Nalini and Monishka's support, at the engagement party Ronit gives a speech that exposes the families' selfish sacrifice of their children's happiness for money, which shocks the guests and prompts the Rai family to cancel the business merger. Jagdish asks both Raj and Isha for forgiveness, and the Malhotras give their blessing to Ronit and Isha.

The film ends with a flashforward to several years later, showing an aged Raj with Avantika's young daughter, and implying that Raj's three daughters remain close and happily married in his ancestral home in India.

== Cast ==
- Jackie Shroff as Raj Singh Puri
- Hrithik Roshan as Ronit Malhotra
- Kareena Kapoor as Isha Puri Malhotra
- Rati Agnihotri as Shalini (Special appearance)
- Amrish Puri as Jagadish Kumar Malhotra
- Kiran Rathod as Monishka Rai
- Anang Desai as Lalit Kumar Malhotra
- Supriya Karnik as Nalini Malhotra
- Avni Vasa as Avantika Puri
- Himani Rawat as Saania Puri
- Madan Joshi as Ranvir Rai
- Rahul Singh as Sukant
- Dolly Bindra as Sukant's mother
- Rajan Kapoor as Sukant's father
- Kamya Panjabi as Pinky
- Akhil Ghai as Pankaj
- Jennifer Kotwal as Preeti Sahani
- Subhash Ghai (cameo)

== Production ==
Initially, Ameesha Patel was approached for the female lead. However, she declined due to her unavailability. Therefore, Kareena Kapoor was signed, marking her first of several films opposite Hrithik Roshan. Patel later said she was lucky to have missed out on the film, as it was a box office failure.

== Soundtrack ==
Yaadein

Studio album by Anu Malik
- Released: 27 June 2001
- Genre: Feature film soundtrack
- Length: 55:53
- Label: Tips
- Producer: Subhash Ghai

Anu Malik chronology
Aks (2001)	Yaadein (2001)	Lajja (2001)

Music for the film's soundtrack was composed by Anu Malik, with lyrics written by Anand Bakshi. Subhash Ghai wanted A. R. Rahman to compose for the film, but the latter declined the offer, since he was busy with the work of Bombay Dreams. According to the Indian trade website Box Office India, with 2.2 million units sold, the film's soundtrack album was the year's seventh highest-selling Bollywood music album. Tips, that distributed the album in the market, collected more than ₹6.5 crore from the sales.

#	Song	Singer(s)	Raga
1.	"Jab Dil Mile"	Udit Narayan, Asha Bhonsle, Sukhwinder Singh & Sunidhi Chauhan	
2.	"Chanda Taare"	Sukhwinder Singh & Kavita Krishnamurthy	
3.	"Aye Dil Dil Ki Duniya Mein"	KK, Sneha Pant	
4.	"Yaadein Yaad Aati Hai"	Hariharan	Yaman Kalyan
5.	"Chamakti Shaam Hai"	Sonu Nigam & Alka Yagnik	
6.	"Eli Re Eli"	Udit Narayan, Alka Yagnik, Kavita Krishnamurthy, Hema Sardesai & Subramanium	Bhimpalasi
7.	"Kuch Saal Pehle"	Hariharan	
8.	"Yaadein Yaad Aati Hai"	Sunidhi Chauhan & Mahalaxmi Iyer	Yaman Kalyan
9.	"Alaap"	Sunidhi Chauhan	
10	"Theme Music"	Instrumental	
