= Manhar Udhas =

Indian singer

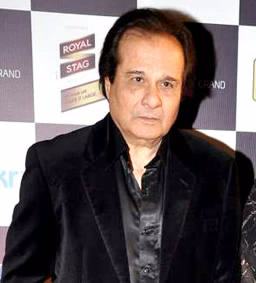
- Manhar Udhas at Mirchi Music Awards in 2013

Background information
- Born: 13 May 1943 (age 83); Savarkundla, Baroda State, British India
- Occupation: Singer

Manhar Udhas is a Hindi and Gujarati language singer and Bollywood playback singer.

== Early life ==
Manhar Udhas is the eldest son of Keshubhai Udhas and Jituben Udhas, and the elder brother of the singer Pankaj Udhas, who died on 26 February in 2024 and Nirmal Udhas. He completed his mechanical engineering training in Gujarat and moved to Mumbai in the late 1960s to look for a job.

With a lifelong passion for music, Manhar found an entry into the industry through his brother-in-law, a filmmaker in Mumbai, who introduced him to Music Directors Kalyanji Anandji. Manhar often assisted the duo in song recording. When the singer Mukesh was not immediately available, it was decided to dub the song in the voice of Udhas and later on Mukesh would sing over it. The song was 'aap se hum ko bichchade huye ek zamana beet gaya' for 1969 film Vishwas. When Mukesh heard the song he said that Udhas has sung the song perfectly and there was no need to record the song in his voice. The song became a hit. It proved to be turning point in his career.

== Career ==
Manhar has worked with many composers of the film world and has lent his voice to many Bollywood actors. He has sung for more than 300 films in different languages, including Gujarati, Hindi, Punjabi, Bengali and many others. He, like his younger brother Pankaj, is well known for singing Ghazals. He has released over 30 albums (last one, "Aashirwad", launched in Australia November 2013). He has also worked with Pankaj on albums and Live Shows. His 31st album Alankar was released at VadFest on 18 January 2015 at Vadodara. His latest album "Aakarshan" was launched on 5 May 2018 in Anand, Gujarat. He also sang for film, Kagaz Ki Nau (1978).

== Discography ==
1969 Vishwas
1970 Preet Na Shamna
1971 Taamari yaad ma Polydor present Music purshotam upadhyay 1970 Purab Aur Paschim
1972 Gomti Ke Kinare 1972 R.D.Burman.

1973 Abhimaan( Lute Koi Man ka Nagar)
1973 Chori Chori
1975 Suraj Dhalti Saanjno
1980 Aap To Aise Na The (Tu Iss Tarah Se); Qurbani (Hum Tumhe Chaahte Hai)

1983 Hero
1983 Log Kya Kahenge
1986 Janbaaz
1985 Mera Jawab
1986 Karma
1986 Naam
1987 Aagman
1988 Dayavan

1988 Avsar
1988 Ram Avtar
1989 Tridev
1989 Ram Lakhan

1989 Anand
1990 Aavkar
1990 Jungle Queen – A Tarzan Love Story
1990 Kishan Kanhaiya

1991 Saudagar
1991 Sadak
1991 Arpan
1991 Ghar Jamai
1992 Prem Deewane
1992 Swati
1992 Aamantran
1993 Arman
1993 Lootere
1993 Khalnayak
1994 Abhinandan
1994 Amrut
1994 Saajan Ka Ghar
1995 Aabhushan
1996 Anurag
1996 Jaan
1997 Abhishek
1997 Trimurti
1998 Aarambh
1998 Anubhav
1999 Asmita
1999 Jaanwar
2000 Aakar
2001 Aawaaz
2002 Aalaap
2003 Apeksha
2005 Aafreen
2006 Akruti
2007 Aabhaar
2008 Akshar
2010 Anmol
2012 Abhilasha
2013 Adbhut
2014 Alankar
2015 Amar
2017 Aradhana
Avsar

=== Singles ===
- Jara aankh michu to chho tame (Maadi mane kahewa de, 1968)
- Aap se hum ko bichhde hue (Vishwas, 1969)
- Purva suhaani aayee (Purab Aur Paschim, 1970)
- Loote koi man ka nagar (Abhimaan, 1973)
- Tu Is Tarah Se (Aap To Aise Na The, 1980)
- Hum tumhe chahte hai aise (Qurbani, 1980)
- Jeete the jiske dum se (Roohi, 1981)
- Tu mera jaanu hai (Hero, 1983)
- Pyar karne wale kabhi (Hero, 1983)
- Har kisi ko nahin milta (Jaanbaaz, 1986)
- Tu kal chala jaayega (Naam, 1986)
- Tera naam liya (Ram Lakhan, 1989)
- Gali Gali mein (Tridev, 1989)
- Laila ne kaha ye majnoo se (Jungle Love, 1990)
- Hum tere bin kahin nahin (Sadak, 1991)
- Ilu Ilu (Saudagar, 1991)
- Ek musafir (Gunaah, 1993)
- Jaan (Jaan, 1996)
- Mausam Ki Tarah Tum Bhi (Jaanwar, 1999)
