= Waman Bhonsle =

Indian film editor (1932–2021)

Waman P. Bhonsle (19 February 1932 – 26 April 2021) was an Indian film editor, who worked in Hindi cinema from 1960s to 1990s.

At the 25th National Film Awards, he won the Best Editing Award for Inkaar.

== Biography ==
He was born in a small village in Goa called Pomburpa on 19 February 1932. He was the third son born to Pandhary and Krishnabai Bhonsle. He did his early schooling in Goa and came to Mumbai in the year 1952 to complete his primary education.

== Career ==
That year on Bhonsle adopted the city of Mumbai as the land of his destiny. He started his tutorship under the trained eyes of Editor D.N.Pai at Bombay Talkies in 1952. After working as an apprentice with Pai for 6 months, he was asked to work at Filmistan as an assistant editor. Bhonsle honed his skills for 12 years at Filmistan and landed his first big assignment as an Independent Editor for Raj Khosla’s film Do Raaste in 1967. He received critical acclaim for his editing technique in this film and built on this success.

In his career he worked with many important film makers of his times: Raj Khosla, Gulzaar, Subhash Ghai, Shekar Kapur, Ravi Tandon, Mahesh Bhat, Raj Sippy, Anil Ganguly, Sunil Dutt, Vikram Bhat, Ashok Gaikwad, K. Viswanath.

In association with these film makers he edited some blockbuster movies like Do Raaste, Mera Gaon Mera Desh, Parichay, Mausam, Aandhi, Kalicharan, Inkaar, Dostana, Karz, Hero, Saaheb, Ram Lakhan, Agneepath, Saudagar, Ghulam, etc.

During the course of his more than 4 decades in the Indian film industry he helped his assistants progress in their careers. The several awards won over the years stand testimony to his craft, his commitment, his focus on mentoring his people and his unwavering belief in advancing Indian Cinema through innovative editing techniques (e.g., The train sequence in Ghulam, 1998).Waman Bhonsle's work in this "railway track scene" is considered among the best in Hindi cinema to date.In this scene, Aamir Khan jumps off the rail track just in time after running towards a speeding train.

He last worked as an editor in Amol Palekar’s Marathi film Kairi (1999). Bhonsle retired in 2002.

== Personal ==
Waman Bhonsle died at his home in Goregaon, Mumbai, on 26 April 2021. He is survived by his four children.

== Awards and recognition ==
- National Film Award for Best Editing for Inkaar in 1978
- Filmfare Award for Best Editing for Saudagar in 1992.
- FTII -Pune honor for Contribution to Indian Cinema in 1997.
- Lux ZeeCine Award for Best Editing for Ghulam in 1998.
- Mumbai Academy of the Moving Image (MAMI) - Technical Excellence Award in 2003
- Goa International Film Festival - Honored for Lifetime Achievement award in 2008.
- Bimal Roy Trophy - Lifetime achievement award by Bimal Roy Memorial and Film Society recognizing his 4 decades contribution to film industry.
