= Nimbehuli =

- Directed by: Hemanth Hegde
- Written by: Hemanth Hegde
- Produced by: Subhash Ghai
- Starring: Hemanth Hegde: Komal Jha; Madhurima Tuli; Nivedhitha
- Cinematography: Sandeep Kumar
- Edited by: P.R Soundarraj
- Music by: Veer Samarth
- Production company: Mukta Arts
- Release date: 28 March 2014
- Running time: 133 minutes
- Country: India
- Language: Kannada

Nimbehuli (Kannada: ನಿಂಬೆಹುಳಿ; transl. Sour Lemon) is a 2014 Kannada-language Indian comedy film written and directed by Hemanth Hegde and produced by veteran director Subhash Ghai. latters marked a maiden Kannada venture. After success of director's first venture Housefull collaborate with Subhash Ghai's production house Mukta Arts for new project. The makers of the 2015 Hindi movie Kis Kisko Pyaar Karoon were sent legal notice for plagiarism. Initially Anupam Kher signed to the project for pivot role but later walked out of the movie.

== Plot ==
Sriram loves a girl, but is unable to get the approval of her parents for marriage. But accidentally he marries three other girls. No one knows of Sriram marriages other than his close friend. During the marriage struggle, he finally gets his lover’s parents to agree to their marriage.

== Cast ==
- Hemanth Hegde as Sriram
- Madhurima Tuli as Janaki
- Komal Jha as Bhoomika
- Nivedhitha as Sitha
- Bullet Prakash as Karuna Raaga
- Girija Lokesh
- Ramesh Bhat
- Om Prakash Rao

== Soundtrack ==
Nimbehuli

Soundtrack album by Veer Samarth
- Released: 23 January 2013
- Genre: Feature film soundtrack
- Length: 25:39
- Language: Kannada
- Label: Anand Audio

Veer Samarth chronology
Adwaitha (2013)	Nimbehuli (2013)	Charlie (2015)

The song "Rama Rama" penned by Dundiraj, a popular poet and composed by Veer Samarth went viral on social media. The song got 80000 hits on YouTube on short period of time. All 6 songs were composed by Veer Samarth.

=== Tracklist ===
No.	Title	Lyrics	Singer(s)	Length
1.	"Rama Rama"	Dundiraj	Veer Samarth	4:25
2.	"Yenagide Yakagide"	Raghavendra Kamath	Chetan Gaudana	3:50
3.	"Nanna Bika Hinde"	Vinayaka Bhat	Ranjith	4:37
4.	"Dona Hadona Ba"	Hemanth Hegde	Krishna Beura	3:57
5.	"Yenagide Yakagide"	Raghavendra Kamath	Rithish Padmanabhan	4:00
6.	"Rama Rama Reprise"	Dundiraj	Krishna Beura	4:48
Total length:				25:39
