= Prem Deewane =

- Directed by: Sachin Pilgaonkar
- Produced by: Ashok Ghai
- Starring: Jackie Shroff; Madhuri Dixit; Vivek Mushran; Pooja Bhatt; Manohar Singh; Ashalata Wabgaonkar; Dara Singh; Reema Lagoo; Ashok Saraf; Prem Chopra; Kamal Chopra
- Music by: Laxmikant–Pyarelal
- Distributed by: Mukta Arts
- Release date: 12 June 1992 (India)
- Running time: 150 minutes
- Country: India
- Language: Hindi

Prem Deewane (translation: Love Crazies) is a 1992 Indian Hindi-language romantic comedy film directed by Sachin Pilgaonkar and produced by Ashok Ghai.

The film was released in India on 12 June 1992 and stars an ensemble cast of Jackie Shroff, Madhuri Dixit, Vivek Mushran, Pooja Bhatt, Manohar Singh, Ashalata Wabgaonkar, Prem Chopra and Kamal Chopra.

The music was composed by Laxmikant-Pyarelal. In the film, Mannu (Mushran) and Radha (Bhatt) are a young couple in love who run away from home together after their parents oppose their relationship. Accordingly, Mannu and Radha are misguided into kidnapping a wealthy person, Ashutosh (Shroff), for a big ransom by a shrewd uncle, Natwarlal (Prem Chopra), who has his own agenda, and things take a turn when Ashutosh's long-lost love, Shivangi (Dixit), is also involved in the struggle.

== Plot ==
Manohar (Vivek Mushran), also known as Mannu, and Radha (Pooja Bhatt) are college sweethearts wishing to get married. But Radha's wealthy father, Somnath (Ashok Saraf), and Mannu's constable father, Loha Singh (Dara Singh), both refuse to approve of their marriage since Mannu comes from a modest family and Radha is still a minor. Mannu and Radha's respective fathers instruct them not to leave their respective houses, but Radha finds a way out to run away and goes to Mannu's home. Anticipating more obstacles, Mannu and Radha escape from the city and are guided by Sumitra (Reema Lagoo), Mannu's mother, and Natwarlal (Prem Chopra), Radha's uncle, in the process. Natwarlal convinces Mannu and Radha to kidnap Ashutosh (Jackie Shroff), the heir to a wealthy family whom they had previously met in college, and demand a big ransom from his father, Arjun Singh (Manohar Singh), and take the money to impress Radha's father. Mannu and Radha then attempt to place their plan of kidnapping Ashutosh into action, but Ashutosh is way smarter and kidnaps the couple instead.

After spending time with Ashutosh, Mannu and Radha learn about his girlfriend, Shivangi Mehra (Madhuri Dixit), who had got separated from Ashutosh due to a misunderstanding created by his father, while Ashutosh's mother, Suman (Ashalata Wabgaonkar), was in a critical condition at the hospital during that time. At the same time, Mannu and Radha also discover that Natwarlal is actually an escaped convict working for Thakral (Kamal Chopra), a powerful crime lord, and plans to kill them and Ashutosh after the kidnapping to usurp his share of money from Ashutosh's father. Meanwhile, Natwarlal telephones Ashutosh's father as Mannu and informs him that his son has been kidnapped. Ashutosh's father visits the police station to file a missing police complaint of his son, and the inspector in charge is Shivangi herself. This leads to a riot of laughter as Mannu, Radha, and Ashutosh are on the run from the police and the criminals. When Shivangi finally catches up to them, Radha and Mannu plan to bring the two lovers together, and this clears up the misunderstanding between them. The climax shows how Natwarlal and Thakral are both punished for their crimes, Ashutosh's love is revealed to Shivangi, both couples are reunited with their respective families, and all is well.

== Cast ==
- Jackie Shroff as Ashutosh Singh
- Madhuri Dixit as Inspector Shivangi Mehra
- Vivek Mushran as Manohar Singh (a.k.a. Mannu)
- Pooja Bhatt as Radha
- Prem Chopra as Natwarlal
- Kamal Chopra as Thakral (Natwarlal's employer)
- Manohar Singh as Arjun Singh (Ashutosh's father)
- Ashalata Wabgaonkar as Suman Singh (Ashutosh's mother)
- Dara Singh as Constable Loha Singh (Mannu's father)
- Reema Lagoo as Sumitra Singh (Mannu's mother)
- Ashok Saraf as Somnath (Radha's father)
- Paintal as Natwarlal's sidekick
- Sachin Pilgaonkar as Man at Pedro's birthday party (cameo appearance)
- Bipin Varti as Man with guitar at Pedro's birthday party (cameo appearance)
- Jairam Kulkarni as Man who delivers Ashutosh's letter to Shivangi (cameo appearance)

== Soundtrack ==
#	Title	Singer(s)
1	"Aise Lagi Dono Taraf Aag Barabar"	Udit Narayan, Alka Yagnik
2	"Prem Deewane (Title Song)"	Manhar Udhas, Kavita Krishnamurthy
3	"Pi Pi Pi Pi Piya Ji Ji Ji Ji Jiya"	Udit Narayan, Alka Yagnik
4	"Yeh Ho Raha Hai Yeh Ho Na Jaye"	Kavita Krishnamurthy, Sachin Pilgaonkar
5	"Happy Birthday To You Oh Mr. Pedro"	Udit Narayan, Amit Kumar, Jolly Mukherjee, Sadhana Sargam
6	"Mohabbat Zindabad"	Udit Narayan, Kavita Krishnamurthy, Mohammad Aziz, Alka Yagnik
