= Yuvvraaj =

2008 film by Subhash Ghai

- Movie poster
- Directed by: Subhash Ghai
- Written by: Sachin Bhowmick; Subhash Ghai; Kamlesh Pandey
- Produced by: Subhash Ghai
- Starring: Salman Khan; Katrina Kaif; Anil Kapoor; Zayed Khan
- Cinematography: Kabir Lal
- Edited by: Subhash Ghai
- Music by: A. R. Rahman
- Production company: Mukta Arts
- Distributed by: Eros International; Shree Ashtavinayak Cine Vision
- Release date: 21 November 2008
- Running time: 159 minutes
- Country: India
- Language: Hindi
- Budget: ₹48 crore
- Box office: ₹31.22 crore

Yuvvraaj (transl. 'Prince') is a 2008 Indian Hindi-language musical romantic family drama film directed and produced by Subhash Ghai. The film stars Salman Khan, Katrina Kaif, Anil Kapoor, Zayed Khan. Yuvvraaj is a musical story of a fragmented family of three brothers who try to con each other to inherit their father's wealth. According to the director, the film is about the arrogance and overconfidence of contemporary youth. The film was released on 21 November 2008. The film received mixed reviews from critics and bombed at the box-office.

== Plot ==
Deven Yuvvraaj "Dev" Singh is a struggling singer who Dr. P. K. Banton, his girlfriend Anushka’s father, dislikes because he is not wealthy and is rather careless at times. He is also revealed to have been disowned by his parents due to a fight he had with his older brother. Not long after, he learns about his father's death in a newspaper. He signs an agreement to become a billionaire in 40 days. To acquire this wealth, he has to go through an emotional roller coaster journey of joy and pain with his two estranged brothers, Gyanesh Kumar Yuvvraaj Singh and Danny Yuvvraaj Singh, whom he meets after 12 years. On meeting them, he is shocked to see that his deceased father has left everything to the mentally challenged Gyanesh. So both Danny and Deven make an agreement to scam their brother out of his money. Danny's attempt to blackmail Gyanesh to make him lie in front of some lawyers fails, and he assaults Gyanesh. Deven intervenes and plays the good guy and helps Gyanesh and takes him to Austria in an attempt to win him. There, Anushka and Gyanesh get along very well, and she is amazed by his singing talent. She lets him into her orchestra, which is due to perform in front of thousands of people. Deven gets jealous as Anushka and Gyanesh get along so well but soon learns to love his brother.

Danny, now penniless and thrown out of all the luxurious clubs, loses his girlfriend. He meets up with Deven and Gyanesh, and they all become loving brothers again and forget about the money. Deven and Danny's maternal uncle and his family decide to poison Gyanesh to get his money. They show Gyanesh a recording of Deven and Danny plotting to scam Gyanesh out of his money, which breaks his heart. They then switch his inhaler with one containing poison and leave. Gyanesh, shocked and breathless, uses his inhaler and fights with his brothers, who realize that he knows about their plot. Heartbroken Gyanesh performs on stage when Deven shows up, and they do a duet with Deven singing about forgiveness. Onstage, Gyanesh collapses, and Deven takes him to the hospital while Danny gets the police to arrest the family members who tried to poison Gyanesh. At the hospital, Deven is informed that the only doctor available is Dr. Banton, who refuses to help. Dr. Banton accuses him of only wanting Gyanesh to survive for the money so he can marry his daughter, but Deven breaks down and tells Dr. Banton that if he saves Gyanesh, he will not marry Anushka, saying he just wants to keep his family together. Dr. Banton is shocked by Deven's sense of responsibility and saves Gyanesh. He then allows Deven to marry Anushka now that he has become a changed man who cares about his family. The ending is a dance scene featuring the cast and crew of the film.

== Cast ==
- Salman Khan as Deven Yuvvraaj "Dev" Singh, a slightly ambitious guy who believes life begins with himself and ends with his love Anushka. A quarrel with his father was reason enough for him to leave home and live as a struggling singer. Devoid of family values, he is forced to journey through the circle of love for the sake of money to complete his love story.
- Anil Kapoor as Gyanesh Kumar Yuvvraaj Singh, an autistic savant, who is completely removed from the idea of money; therefore, his enormous inheritance has no impact on him. By some stroke of destiny, he has a genius disorder. Since childhood, he was brilliant in all aspects of music. He enters Deven’s world of music and effortlessly becomes the superstar that Deven dreamt of being.
- Zayed Khan as Danny Yuvvraaj Singh is the real prince who lived life super-large. A passion for flying kept him floating on an air cushion filled with his father’s money. A playboy and a brat, he was sure that the inheritance would be his. Unable to deal with the loss of his playground (as casinos and clubs threw him out), he strikes at Gyanesh in an attempt to get back what he thinks was rightfully his.
- Katrina Kaif as Anushka "Anu" Banton, an angelic women who is passionately in love with her 'cello and Deven. She is also a woman of very high values. Although she loves Deven, she refuses to marry him unless her father accepts him willingly. (Hindi voice dubbed as Mona Ghosh Shetty)
- Boman Irani as Dr. Pravin Kant "PK" Banton, Anushka's father who dislikes her daughter's love interest Deven.
- Aanjjan Srivastav as Om Prakash 'Mama Ji' who has declared the trustee of all property transferred to an orphanage, a negative character, who keeps a subtle approach, but all in disguise.
- Sulabha Arya as D'Mello Aunty
- Aushima Sawhney as Nandita
- Amy Maghera as Shazia, Danny's girlfriend
- Bhupinder Singh as Daniel Mehta, Anushka's fiancee
- Aparna Kumar as Sukamna
- Chimnay Patwardhan as Bala
- Javed Sheikh as Yogendra Yuvvraaj Singh; Gyanesh, Deven, and Danny’s late father (cameo appearance)
- Mithun Chakraborty as Advocate Sikander Mirza, an attorney and a friend of Gyanesh, Deven, and Danny's father. He insists Deven on having a true brotherly relation with Gyanesh. He wants to see the three brothers live as a happily united family. (special appearance)

== Filming ==
Although a part of the film supposedly plays in the Czech capital Prague, the corresponding outdoor shots were actually filmed in the Austrian mountain province Tyrol. Scenes filmed in the province's capital Innsbruck feature many of the city's sights, such as the imperial castle, St. James's Cathedral, the main street and the ski jumping arena.

== Reception ==
=== Critical response ===
The film received mixed reviews from critics. Taran Adarsh from Bollywood Hungama gave the film 3 out of 5 saying "On the whole, Yuvvraaj is interesting in parts, with the penultimate 20/25 minutes taking the film to an all-time high". Nikhat Kazmi from Times of India rated it 3 out of 5 while praising the music, cinematography and performances by Salman Khan, Anil Kapoor and Katrina Kaif.

The film also received a number of negative reviews. Rajeev Masand of IBN Live gave the film 1 out of 5 stars saying "Yuvvraaj doesn't quite hit the right note because it's an archaic drama that feels too tired. Barring a handful of vintage Subhash Ghai moments that still work, the film sadly is far from his best work". Sonia Chopra of Sify gave the film 1.5/5.

=== Box office ===
Yuvraaj was released with around 1000 prints in India, but it opened to a good response. The film only managed to collect around ₹169.5 million (equivalent to ₹470 million or US$4.9 million in 2023). Box Office India declared it a major flop.

== Soundtrack ==
Yuvvraaj

Soundtrack album by A. R. Rahman
- Released: 15 October 2008
- Recorded: Panchathan Record Inn and AM Studios
- Genre: Film soundtrack
- Length: 44 minutes
- Labels: T-Series; Tips Industries
- Producer: A. R. Rahman

A. R. Rahman chronology
Sakkarakatti (2008)	Yuvvraaj (2008)	Ghajini (2008)

The music is composed by A. R. Rahman and lyrics are written by Gulzar. The score was performed by the Chennai String Orchestra, and utilizes Western classical music and retro disco music. The orchestra also performs Beethoven's Fifth Symphony. The soundtrack album was released on 15 October 2008.

All lyrics are written by Gulzar; all music is composed by A. R. Rahman.

Track list
No.	Title	Artist(s)	Length
1.	"Main Hoon Yuvvraaj"	Salman Khan	1:13
2.	"Tu Meri Dost Hai"	Benny Dayal, Shreya Ghoshal, A. R. Rahman	6:13
3.	"Shanno Shanno"	Karthik, Sonu Nigam, Naresh Iyer, Srinivas, Timmy, Sunaina, Vivienne Pocha, Tina, Blaaze	6:22
4.	"Tu Muskura"	Alka Yagnik, Javed Ali, A. R. Rahman	5:37
5.	"Mastam Mastam"	Sonu Nigam, Alka Yagnik, Benny Dayal, Naresh Iyer	6:17
6.	"Zindagi"	Srinivas	5:06
7.	"Dil Ka Rishta"	Sonu Nigam, Roop Kumar Rathod, A. R. Rahman, Clinton Cerejo, Suzanne D'Mello, Vivienne Pocha, Sunaina, Benny Dayal, Naresh Iyer, Blaaze	7:39
8.	"Manmohini Morey"	Vijay Prakash	3:11
9.	"Shanno Shanno" (remix by Krishna Chetan)	Karthik, Sonu Nigam, Naresh Iyer, Srinivas, Timmy, Sunaina, Vivienne Pocha, Tina, Blaaze	2:38

=== Reception ===
The album received positive reviews. Rediff.com gave it 4 out of 5 stars and said Rahman excels in Yuvvraaj.
