= Whistling Woods International =

Creative arts institute in Mumbai, India

Coordinates: 19.1624°N 72.8865°E

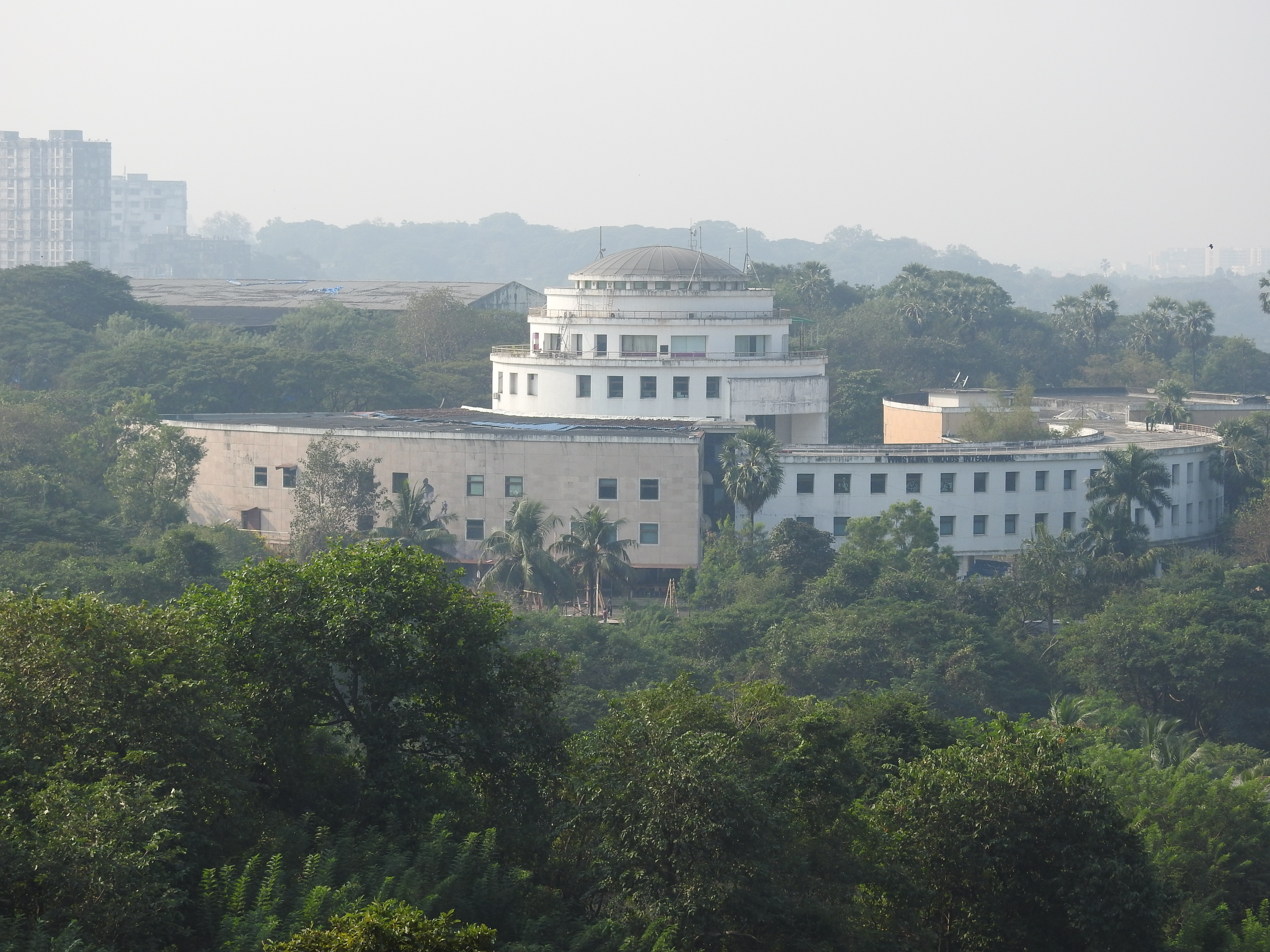
- Type: Institute of Film, Communication and Creative Arts
- Established: 2006; 20 years ago
- Founder: Subhash Ghai
- Chairman: Subhash Ghai
- President: Meghna Ghai Puri
- Location: Goregaon, Mumbai, India
- Website: www.whistlingwoods.net

Whistling Woods International is a film, communication and creative arts institute located in Mumbai, India. Founded in 2006 by Subhash Ghai. The institute is promoted by the Indian Filmmaker Subhash Ghai, Mukta Arts and Film City Mumbai. In July 2014, The Hollywood Reporter named Whistling Woods International on its list of "The best film schools in the world". The school was first ranked among the top 10 film schools by The Hollywood Reporter in 2010.

Programmes offered at Whistling Woods International vary in duration from 1 year to 4 years. All the major specialisations of the Media, Communication & Creative industry are catered to in the seven schools housed at Whistling Woods International, Namely, School of Filmmaking, Actors' Studio, School of Animation, School of Design, School of Fashion, School of Media & Communication and School of Music.

Whistling Woods International has affiliated with Tata Institute of Social Sciences to offer 2, 3 and 4 year graduate and postgraduate programs.
