= Gautam Govinda =

- Promotional Poster
- Directed by: Subhash Ghai
- Produced by: Shyam Sunder Shivdasani
- Starring: Shashi Kapoor; Shatrughan Sinha; Moushumi Chatterjee; Aruna Irani; Vijay Arora; Nirupa Roy; Premnath; Madan Puri
- Music by: Laxmikant–Pyarelal
- Release date: 2 March 1979
- Country: India
- Language: Hindi

Gautam-Govinda is a 1979 Indian Hindi-language action film directed by Subhash Ghai. The film stars Shashi Kapoor, Shatrughan Sinha, Moushumi Chatterjee, Aruna Irani, Vijay Arora, Nirupa Roy, Premnath, Madan Puri in pivotal roles. Reena Roy appeared in a special appearance. The music was composed by Laxmikant-Pyarelal.

== Plot ==
The story begins with honest police officer Gautam — an orphan — being sent on a "punishment posting" to a village whose last few inspectors were either killed or driven away. Once there, he subdues some local unsocial elements and manages to establish some semblance of order.

However, it is then that he comes up against a more formidable enemy: Rajasahab Dharam Dutt. This Rajasahab has his hooks deep into the villagers' flesh, and they do his bidding. His henchmen include Govinda, whom Rajasahab values as a trusted subordinate when it comes to doing his bidding.

We are also introduced to village belle Sandhya, who, over time, develops respect and then love for Gautam, who eventually reciprocates. Meanwhile, Govinda seems to have an admirer in Gulabo, another village belle.

Rajasahab tasks Govinda to kill Gautam. He tries and fails twice. Gautam even saves Govinda's mother Ganga during the second attempt, and manages to win over her motherly love.

In between all of this, Gautam also learns that Ganga is his own mother, making Govinda his brother. Rajasahab had killed their father when he tried to rebel against the former's oppression. That was also when Gautam got separated from his mother, who was pregnant with Govinda.

Gautam manages to reform Govinda and a few other villagers, and they appear to throw off Rajasahab's yoke of oppression. Gautam is then chosen for a government award for this reform, and leaves the village to receive it.

That is when Rajasahab's younger brother Bagga sows discord in the village, claiming that Gautam received Rs 2 lakh from Rajasahab as a bribe. Govinda, enticed by a similar bribe, lets Bagga do whatever he wants to the village.

Gautam returns to see the village burning. He reveals his identity to Sandhya, and then goes and confronts Govinda, who bests him and gets his henchmen — he is turning to dacoity — to deliver Gautam to Rajasahab.

Sandhya arrives and reveals Gautam's identity to Govinda and Ganga. A remorseful Govinda decides to rescue his brother. At Rajasahab's palace, he tries to use tricks to free Gautam, but Rajasahab sees through it and pits them against each other. Ganga and the villagers arrive to their rescue, and Rajasahab is killed, freeing the village from his tyranny.

== Cast ==
- Shashi Kapoor as Inspector Gautam
- Shatrughan Sinha as Govinda
- Moushumi Chatterjee as Sandhya
- Aruna Irani as Gulabo
- Vijay Arora as Gopala
- Nirupa Roy as Ganga
- Premnath as Dharam Dutt
- Madan Puri as Raja Bhagendra Singh / Bagga
- Viju Khote as Constable Bansi
- Reena Roy as Dancer (Special Appearance)

== Music ==
"Ek Ritu Aaye, Ek Ritu Jaye", sung by Kishore Kumar is an evergreen classic.

Song	Singer
"Ek Ritu Aaye, Ek Ritu Jaye" -based on Raag Bhairav	Kishore Kumar
"Sar Jhuka, Nazar Utha, Be-Adab Salaam Kar"	Lata Mangeshkar, Manna Dey
"O Tera Betwa Jawan Hoi Gava"	Mohammed Rafi, Asha Bhosle
"Darogaji, Chori Ho Gayi"	Asha Bhosle
