= Hero (1983 film) =

1983 Indian film by Subhash Ghai

- Theatrical poster
- Directed by: Subhash Ghai
- Written by: Mukta Ghai; Subhash Ghai; Ram Kelkar
- Produced by: Subhash Ghai
- Starring: Jackie Shroff; Meenakshi Seshadri; Shammi Kapoor; Sanjeev Kumar; Shakti Kapoor; Madan Puri; Amrish Puri
- Cinematography: Kamalakar Rao
- Edited by: Waman Bhonsle; Gurudutt Shirali
- Music by: Laxmikant–Pyarelal
- Distributed by: Mukta Arts Ltd.
- Release date: 16 December 1983 (India)
- Running time: 173 minutes
- Country: India
- Language: Hindi
- Budget: ₹ 3cr
- Box office: ₹ 17cr.

Hero is a 1983 Indian Hindi-language romantic action film directed by Subhash Ghai. Starring Jackie Shroff and Meenakshi Sheshadri, it marked Shroff's debut in a lead role. Its music directors were Laxmikant–Pyarelal. It became a blockbuster at the box office and established Shroff as a leading Bollywood actor.

It was remade in Telugu and Kannada in 1980s and in Hindi in 2015 with the same title. A Tamil remake was planned, but later dropped.

== Plot ==
The film starts with Pasha (Amrish Puri) being taken to prison. To get out of the situation, he writes to his best man, Jackie (Jackie Shroff). Jackie goes to Police Commissioner Shrikanth Mathur (Shammi Kapoor) and warns him. He then kidnaps Shrikanth's daughter Radha (Meenakshi Sheshadri). He tells her that he is a police officer and they fall in love; however, she finds out that he is a gangster but does not leave him and urges him to surrender. Transformed by her love, Jackie surrenders to the police and is imprisoned for two years.

Back home, Radha tells her brother Daamodar (Sanjeev Kumar) the truth about Jackie. To prevent Radha from marrying somebody else, he calls his friend Jimmy (Shakti Kapoor) to put on a show that Radha and Jimmy love each other. Jimmy misunderstands the situation and falls in love with Radha. When Jackie comes back, he starts working in a garage and tries to reform himself. Despite everything, Shrikanth kicks him out of his life. After many days and events that follow, Daamodar finds out that Jimmy is a drug smuggler. After his release from prison, Pasha desires revenge against both Shrikanth and Jackie, so he kidnaps Radha, Shrikanth and Daamodar. Jackie comes at the last moment and frees all of them. In the end, Shrikanth lets Radha marry Jackie.

== Cast ==
- Jackie Shroff as Jai Kishan "Kishan" / Jackie Dada
- Meenakshi Sheshadri as Radha Mathur
- Sanjeev Kumar as Damodar Mathur
- Neeta Mehta as Mrs. Uma Damodar Mathur
- Shammi Kapoor as Police Commissioner Shrikanth Mathur
- Amrish Puri as Pasha
- Madan Puri as Bharat
- Bindu as Jamuna (Radha's widowed aunt)
- Bharat Bhushan as Ramu
- Shakti Kapoor as Jimmy Thapa
- Urmila Bhatt as Sandhya Mathur
- Shaikh Azad as Shaikh Faruk
- Suresh Oberoi as Himself
- Madhu Malhotra (special appearance)

== Production ==
Subhash Ghai had initially wanted Kamal Haasan to play the film's lead role, when the project was titled as Sangeet, but his unavailability led to the producers casting debutant Jackie Shroff.

Jackie Shroff revealed in a 2017 interview that he is a huge fan of veteran actor Dev Anand, and during the filming of Hero often said his dialogues in Dev Anand's style. Ghai wanted him to deliver his dialogues like Shatrughan Sinha instead.

== Soundtrack ==
Composed by the musical duo Laxmikant Pyarelal with lyrics written by Anand Bakshi. The music of Hero is one of the complete albums containing songs of each genre. It had typical Bollywood song with modern beats ( Tu Mera Janu Hai, Ding Dong O Baby sing song), a Qawwali ( Mohabbat ye mohabbat), a folk song (Lambi Judai) and Hindustani Classical based song (Nindiyase Jagi Bahar). The music of Hero was well appreciated by critics and the masses alike.

Track listing

No.	Title	Singer(s)	Length
1.	"Ding Dong"	Anuradha Paudwal, Manhar Udhas	08:27
2.	"Mohabbat Ye Mohabbat"	Lata Mangeshkar, Suresh Wadkar	06:45
3.	"Lambi Judaai"	Reshma	06:26
4.	"Nindya Se Jaagi Bahaar (Raga Yaman Kalyan)"	Lata Mangeshkar	06:18
5.	"Pyar Karne Wale Kabhi Darte Nahi (Raga Bhairavi)"	Lata Mangeshkar, Manhar Udhas	05:55
6.	"Tu Mera Hero Hai"	Anuradha Paudwal, Manhar Udhas	08:03

== Reception ==
The film was declared a "blockbuster" at the Indian box office, with Shroff and Sheshadri becoming stars after its release. Hero ran for 750 days in many cities in India. Both actors were in demand after its release and began a long association with Ghai. Younger audiences enjoyed the performances, and critics applauded Ghai for using fresh faces at a time when Amitabh Bachchan was the dominant star in Bollywood. The Yamaha Rajdoot 350 bike was heavily promoted in this movie.

== Awards ==
31st Filmfare Awards:

Nominated

- Best Music Director – Laxmikant–Pyarelal
- Best Female Playback Singer – Anuradha Paudwal for "Tu Mera Hero Hai"

== Remakes ==
Year	Film title	Language	Director
1986	Vikram	Telugu	V. Madhusudhana Rao
1988	Ranadheera	Kannada	V. Ravichandran
2015	Hero	Hindi	Nikhil Advani
