= Pardes (1997 film) =

1997 Indian film by Subhash Ghai

- Theatrical release poster
- Directed by: Subhash Ghai
- Written by: Subhash Ghai
- Dialogues by: Javed Siddiqui
- Produced by: Subhash Ghai
- Starring: Shah Rukh Khan; Mahima Chaudhry; Apurva Agnihotri; Amrish Puri; Alok Nath; Himani Shivpuri
- Cinematography: Kabir Lal
- Edited by: Renu Saluja
- Music by: Songs: Nadeem–Shravan; Score: Vanraj Bhatia
- Production company: Mukta Arts
- Release date: 8 August 1997
- Running time: 191 minutes
- Country: India
- Language: Hindi
- Budget: ₹10 crore
- Box office: ₹40.95 crore

Pardes (transl. Foreign land) is a 1997 Indian Hindi-language musical romantic drama film directed, produced, and co-written by Subhash Ghai under his banner Mukta Arts. It stars Shah Rukh Khan, and newcomers Mahima Chaudhry and Apurva Agnihotri in lead roles, with Alok Nath, Amrish Puri and Himani Shivpuri in supporting roles. The film was shot at various locations in the United States (Los Angeles, Las Vegas), Canada (British Columbia, including Vancouver) and India (Uttarakhand and Uttar Pradesh, including Agra).

Pardes theatrically released in India on 8 August 1997. It received mixed-to-positive reviews from critics, with praise for its soundtrack and Khan, Chaudhry, and Agnihotri's performances; however its story and screenplay received criticism. It grossed over ₹409 million (equivalent to ₹2.3 billion or US$24 million in 2026) worldwide, emerging as a commercial success at the box-office, ranking as the fourth highest-grossing film of the year, behind Dil To Pagal Hai (also starring Khan), Border, and Ishq.

At the 43rd Filmfare Awards, Pardes received 12 nominations, including Best Film, Best Director (Ghai) and Best Actress (Chaudhry), and won 3 awards – Best Female Debut (Chaudhry), Best Female Playback Singer (Alka Yagnik for "Meri Mehbooba") and Best Screenplay (Ghai).

The film was remade in Telugu as Pelli Kanuka (1998). It was released on the eve of celebration of 50th anniversary of the Indian independence.

== Plot ==
Kishori Lal, an Indian-American businessman, wants his son, Rajeev, to marry his best friend's daughter, Ganga. Born and raised entirely in India, he believes Ganga can help ‘Indian-ise’ Rajeev, who as a second-generation American, knows nothing about the traditional family values of his father’s home country. A meeting is arranged in Ganga’s village, and Kishori sends Rajeev, along with his adopted son, Arjun, to stay with Ganga’s family. Like Kishori, Arjun is a first-generation immigrant. He helps manage the family chaos surrounding Rajeev’s visit, enabling Rajeev and Ganga to spend time getting to know each other. Finally, after weeks of talking, Rajeev and Ganga agree to get married. They are engaged in the village, and Ganga flies to the US with Rajeev.

In the US, Arjun becomes Ganga’s sole confidante, as she deals with culture shock and frequent jabs aimed at her Indian-ness. Rajeev shows a different side of himself, including his excessive smoking and drinking habits, entitled behaviour and continued association with numerous ex-girlfriends. Ganga questions her decision to marry him, while blaming Arjun for deceiving her about Rajeev’s true character. When Arjun tries to warn Rajeev, his efforts are construed as interference and Kishori sends Arjun away on a business trip, 'for his career'. Meanwhile, Rajeev and Ganga take their first solo trip together to Las Vegas.

After a day of sightseeing, Rajeev and Ganga are alone in her hotel room at night, where they argue over Ganga’s insistence on abstaining until marriage. Rajeev then proceeds to make offensive remarks about India, resulting in Ganga slapping him and cancelling the relationship by throwing away her ring. Rajeev slaps Ganga resulting in a physical fight, ending with Rajeev overpowering Ganga on the floor. He tries to force himself upon her, but Ganga manages to knock him out with a lamp. She runs away from the hotel, and is found by Arjun at a train station, attempting to leave the city. Arjun escorts Ganga back home to her family in India. In the village, Arjun and Ganga are accused of having eloped behind Rajeev’s back. Arjun is removed from Ganga's house, and is intercepted by Rajeev's goons on his way out of town.

Arjun and Rajeev fight unto death, but Kishori intervenes in time. He demands to know why Arjun betrayed him, but Arjun clarifies that he was only protecting Ganga and not trying to elope with her while simultaneously confessing his love for her. As Arjun heads out of town, Ganga shows everyone the marks on her neck as evidence of Rajeev trying to physically abuse her in Vegas. A stunned Kishori slaps Rajeev and orders him back to the US, away from Ganga. With Arjun's reputation restored, he is given Ganga's hand in marriage, as the two have also grown to love each other. As end credits roll, Ganga and Arjun are back in the US, but this time as a married couple.

== Cast ==
- Shah Rukh Khan as Arjun Saagar, Kishorilal's foster son
- Mahima Chaudhry as Kusum Ganga
- Apurva Agnihotri as Rajiv, Kishorilal's biological son
- Amrish Puri as Kishori Lal, Arjun's foster father and Rajiv's biological father
- Alok Nath as Suraj Dev, Ganga's father
- Padmavati Rao as Narmada
- Dina Pathak as Dadi Maa
- Himani Shivpuri as Kulwanti
- Madhuri Bhatia as Neeta Sandiplal, Arjun's foster aunt
- Smita Jaykar as Padma
- Pavan Malhotra as Sharafat Ali
- Prachi Save Saathi as Daksha
- Aditya Narayan as Potla
- Ajay Nagrath as Dabboo
- Samta Sagar as Sonali Shahi
- Subhash Ghai as singer in a boat
- Rakesh Thareja as Shekhar Paul, Rajiv's friend
- Ruhshad Nariman Daruwalla as Vikrant Pathak, Potla's friend
- Akash as Karnataki
- Richa Anderson as Kelly, Rajiv's ex-girlfriend
- Sukhwinder Singh Chahal as Ramu
- Deepak Qazir as Amirchand
- Vinod Raut as Garibchand
- Anand Balraj as Manuchand

== Soundtrack ==
Pardes

Soundtrack album by Nadeem–Shravan
- Released: June 1997
- Genre: Feature film soundtrack
- Length: 58:18
- Languages: Hindi and English
- Labels: Tips; Zee Music Company
- Producer: Nadeem–Shravan

Ghai wanted A. R. Rahman to compose the music of this film, but he was too expensive and didn't fit the budget of the film. However, they collaborated on Ghai's next, Taal (1999). The soundtrack of Pardes was then composed by Nadeem–Shravan and the lyrics were penned by Anand Bakshi. The song "I Love My India" is composed in Raag Bairagi Bhairav (known as Revati in Carnatic Music). For their work, Nadeem–Shravan received a Filmfare Award for Best Music Director nomination and won a Screen Award for Best Music Director. This was the only album where K.S. Chithra sung a Hindi song for Nadeem–Shravan.

Track list

#	Title	Singer(s)	Raga
1	"Do Dil Mil Rahe Hain"	Kumar Sanu	
2	"Meri Mehbooba"	Kumar Sanu, Alka Yagnik	
3	"Yeh Dil Deewana"	Sonu Nigam, Hema Sardesai & Shankar Mahadevan	
4	"I Love My India"	Kavita Krishnamurthy, Hariharan, Aditya Narayan & Shankar Mahadevan	Bairagi (raga)
5	"Jahan Piya Wahan Main"	K. S. Chithra, Shankar Mahadevan	
6	"Nahin Hona Tha"	Alka Yagnik, Udit Narayan, Hema Sardesai & Sabri Brothers	
7	"My First Day In U.S.A"	Hema Sardesai	
8	"I Love My India" (Female)	Kavita Krishnamurthy	
9	"Title Music"	Sapna Awasthi	

=== Reception ===
Planet Bollywood started their review by saying, "The music of Pardes is one of Nadeem-Shravan's best ever."

== Box office ==
Pardes grossed ₹34.83 crore in India and $1.7 million (₹6.12 crore) overseas, for a worldwide total of ₹40.95 crore ($11.4 million), against its ₹10 crore budget. It had a worldwide opening weekend of ₹3.4 crore, and grossed ₹6.19 crore in its first week. It is the 4th-highest-grossing film of 1997 in India.

=== India ===
It opened on Friday, August 8, 1997, across 210 screens, and earned ₹61 lakh nett on its opening day. It grossed ₹2 crore nett in its opening weekend, and had a first week of ₹3.64 crore nett. The film earned a total of ₹22.83 crore nett, and was declared a "super-hit" by Box Office India. It is the 4th highest-grossing film of 1997 in India.

=== Overseas ===
It earned $1.7 million (₹6.12 crore in 1997) outside India. Overseas, it is the 2nd highest-grossing film of 1997 after Dil To Pagal Hai, which grossed $3.3 million (₹12.04 crore in 1997).

Pardes worldwide collections breakdown
Territory	Territory wise Collections break-up
India	Nett income: ₹31.83 crore
India	Entertainment tax: ₹12 crore
India	Total gross: ₹43.83 crore
International (outside India)	$1.7 million (₹6.12 crore in 1997)
Worldwide	₹49.95 crore ($11.4 million)

== Reception ==
Pardes received mixed-to-positive reviews from critics. Praise was given to the music and the cast's performances; however the story and screenplay of the film received criticism.

India Today cites it as one of the first major Bollywood pictures to succeed in the United States.

In their book, New Cosmopolitanisms: South Asians in the US, Gita Rajan and Shailja Sharma view the film as a dichotomous depiction of the good NRI versus bad NRI, with Khan depicting the good immigrant, who assists the rowdy Indian American playboy Rajiv (Apurva Agnihotri), the bad. Khan's character of Arjun is perceived as a metaphor for cosmopolitanism or Indian cultural nationalism in the wider sense, in direct contrast to Rajiv who represents wealthy Westernization and all its negative vices and connotations.

== Accolades ==
Award (Note: Awards, festivals and organizations are in alphabetical order.)	Date of ceremony (Note: Date is linked to the article about the awards held that year, wherever possible.)	Category	Recipient(s)	Result	Ref.
Filmfare Awards	31 January 1998	Best Film	Subhash Ghai	Nominated	
Filmfare Awards	31 January 1998	Best Director	Subhash Ghai	Nominated	
Filmfare Awards	31 January 1998	Best Screenplay	Subhash Ghai	Won	
Filmfare Awards	31 January 1998	Best Actress	Mahima Chaudhry	Nominated	
Filmfare Awards	31 January 1998	Best Female Debut	Mahima Chaudhry	Won	
Filmfare Awards	31 January 1998	Best Music Director	Nadeem–Shravan	Nominated	
Filmfare Awards	31 January 1998	Best Lyricist	Anand Bakshi for "I Love My India"	Nominated	
Filmfare Awards	31 January 1998	Best Lyricist	Anand Bakshi for "Meri Mehbooba"	Nominated	
Filmfare Awards	31 January 1998	Best Male Playback Singer	Hariharan for "I Love My India"	Nominated	
Filmfare Awards	31 January 1998	Best Male Playback Singer	Kumar Sanu for "Do Dil Mil Rahe Hain"	Nominated	
Filmfare Awards	31 January 1998	Best Female Playback Singer	Alka Yagnik for "Meri Mehbooba"	Won	
Filmfare Awards	31 January 1998	Best Female Playback Singer	Kavita Krishnamurthy for "I Love My India"	Nominated	
Screen Awards	17 January 1998	Best Film	Pardes	Nominated	
Screen Awards	17 January 1998	Best Director	Subhash Ghai	Nominated	
Screen Awards	17 January 1998	Most Promising Newcomer – Male	Apurva Agnihotri	Nominated	
Screen Awards	17 January 1998	Most Promising Newcomer – Female	Mahima Chaudhry	Nominated	
Screen Awards	17 January 1998	Best Music Director	Nadeem–Shravan	Won	
Screen Awards	17 January 1998	Best Lyricist	Anand Bakshi for "Do Dil Mil Rahe Hain"	Nominated	
Screen Awards	17 January 1998	Best Lyricist	Anand Bakshi for "I Love My India"	Nominated	
Screen Awards	17 January 1998	Best Male Playback Singer	Kumar Sanu for "Do Dil Mil Rahe Hain"	Nominated	
Screen Awards	17 January 1998	Best Cinematography	Kabir Lal	Won	
Zee Cine Awards	14 March 1998	Best Film	Subhash Ghai	Nominated	
Zee Cine Awards	14 March 1998	Best Director	Subhash Ghai	Nominated	
Zee Cine Awards	14 March 1998	Best Story	Subhash Ghai	Nominated	
Zee Cine Awards	14 March 1998	Best Cinematography	Kabir Lal	Nominated	
Zee Cine Awards	14 March 1998	Best Actor – Male	Shah Rukh Khan	Nominated	
Zee Cine Awards	14 March 1998	Best Actor in a Supporting Role – Male	Apurva Agnihotri	Nominated	
Zee Cine Awards	14 March 1998	Best Male Debut	Apurva Agnihotri	Nominated	
Zee Cine Awards	14 March 1998	Best Female Debut	Mahima Chaudhry	Won	
Zee Cine Awards	14 March 1998	Best Music Director	Nadeem–Shravan	Nominated	
Zee Cine Awards	14 March 1998	Best Background Score	Vanraj Bhatia	Won	
Zee Cine Awards	14 March 1998	Best Lyricist	Anand Bakshi for "I Love My India"	Nominated	
Zee Cine Awards	14 March 1998	Best Playback Singer – Male	Kumar Sanu for "Do Dil Mil Rahe Hain"	Nominated	
Zee Cine Awards	14 March 1998	Best Playback Singer – Female	Kavita Krishnamurthy for "I Love My India"	Nominated	
Zee Cine Awards	14 March 1998	Best Editing	Renu Saluja	Nominated	
Zee Cine Awards	14 March 1998	Best Make Up Artist	Kiran R. Naik	Nominated	
Zee Cine Awards	14 March 1998	Best Sound Recording	Rakesh Ranjan	Won	
Zee Cine Awards	14 March 1998	Best Re-Recording	Anup Dev	Nominated	
Zee Cine Awards	14 March 1998	Best Song Recording	Hassan Sheikh	Nominated	
Zee Cine Awards	14 March 1998	Best Special Effects (Visual)	Ramesh Meer	Nominated	
