= Kalicharan =

- Film poster
- Directed by: Subhash Ghai
- Written by: Jainendra Jain (dialogue)
- Screenplay by: Ram Kelkar
- Story by: Subhash Ghai; Bharat B. Bhalla
- Produced by: N. N. Sippy
- Starring: Shatrughan Sinha; Reena Roy; Premnath; Ajit; Madan Puri; Danny Denzongpa
- Cinematography: K. K. Mahajan
- Edited by: Waman Bhonsle; Gurudutt Shirali
- Music by: Kalyanji-Anandji
- Production companies: R. K. Studios; Prithiva Pictures
- Distributed by: N. N. Sippy Productions
- Release date: 7 February 1976
- Country: India
- Language: Hindi

Kalicharan is a 1976 Indian Hindi-language action thriller film directed by Subhash Ghai, starring Shatrughan Sinha, Reena Roy, Premnath, Ajit, Madan Puri and Danny Denzongpa. The film became a box office hit. The film was the directorial debut of Subhash Ghai and was the breakthrough role for stars Shatrughan Sinha and Reena Roy. It was later remade into the Telugu film Khaidi Kalidasu (1977), the Kannada film Kaalinga (1980), the Tamil film Sangili (1982) and the Malayalam film Pathamudayam (1985).

== Plot ==
Dindayal has a reputation of an honest, rich and clean-hearted man. However, this is a facade as he is a complete villain known as LION in the world of crime. He is the man under whom black-marketing, smuggling and robberies flourish. No one has an idea about his evil deeds. Not even his close friend IG P.N. Khanna. Khanna is very worried at the sorry state of affairs in the city and state. He requests the government to bring back Inspector Prabhakar to the city as he is an honest and fearless cop. Prabhakar comes to town and starts cracking on the criminals with an iron hand. Prabhakar is a widower who has two children. Besides them, IG Khanna loves him like his own son and treats the children as his grandchildren. After making substantial raids, Prabhakar learns that Din Dayal is a corrupt man and a demon for society. He plans to spill the beans in front of everyone, but is killed by Din Dayal's men. Before dying, he leaves a cryptic clue for the police to nab the criminal, but nobody is able to understand what the clue says.

Khanna is heartbroken and he loses hope in life. Due to a friend, he learns that there is a ferocious prisoner Kalicharan in a jail who resembles Prabhakar. Khanna visits him, but finds him a beastly figure. Still, in an attempt to trace the criminals, he gets him released and takes him to a hill station where he attempts to transform him. But Kalicharan is a tough nut to crack. However, after some time it is Prabhakar's sister who wins the heart of the fugitive. Kalicharan was in prison as he had murdered the people who had raped his sister. He was still in search of the main culprit Shetty, who was a fellow shooter with Kalicharan in a circus, but wanted to rope in his talent in the killing of a man. Kalicharan makes peace with Khanna and slowly but steadily transforms into a police inspector. He manages to win the heart of Sapna (Reena Roy) and even the kids of Prabhakar accept him as their father. He finds the truth behind Prabhakar's murder and brings Din Dayal to the hands of law. In the process, he manages to win friends like Shaka and eliminate his old enemy Shetty.

== Cast ==
- Shatrughan Sinha as DSP Prabhakar / Inspector Kalicharan (Dual Role)
- Reena Roy as Sapna
- Premnath as I.G. Khanna
- Ajit as Dindayal / Lion
- Madan Puri as Jagir Singh
- Danny Denzongpa as Shaka
- Alka as Anju
- Viju Khote as Hawaldar Kishan
- David as Jailor David
- Dinesh Thakur as Manav
- Krishan Dhawan as Avtar Set
- Tyrone Aviet as dancer in song Ja re ja o har jai
- Ratan Gaurang as servant in Simla

== Production ==
N. N. Sippy initially wanted Rajesh Khanna to play the title role, but Subhash Ghai chose the then less popular Shatrughan Sinha because "I felt that more than a star, I needed an actor who would be apt for the character".

== Soundtrack ==
Songs were written Rajkavi Inderjeet Singh Tulsi, Ravindra Jain and composed by Kalyanji-Anandji.

Song	Singer	Raga
"Yeh Pal Chanchal Kho Na Dena Kahin, O Deewane"	Kishore Kumar, Asha Bhosle	
"Ja Re Ja O Harjaee"	Lata Mangeshkar	Bibhas
"Ek Bata Do, Do Bate Char"	Anuradha Paudwal, Kanchan	
"Yeh Log Bhala Kya Pehchane, Tum Jano Ya Hum Jane"	Mohammed Rafi, Asha Bhosle	
