= Subhash Ghai =

Indian filmmaker (born 1945)

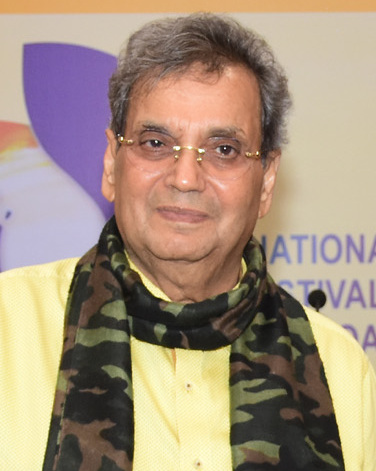
- Ghai in 2024
- Born: 24 January 1945 (age 81); Nagpur, Central Provinces and Berar, British India (present-day Maharashtra, India)
- Education: Film and Television Institute of India
- Occupations: Director; producer; screenwriter; actor; lyricist; editor; music director
- Years active: 1967–present
- Spouse: Mukta Ghai (m. 1970)
- Children: 2
- Website: muktaarts.com

Subhash Ghai (born 24 January 1945) is an Indian film director, producer, actor, lyricist, music director and screenwriter, primarily known for his work in Hindi cinema. He was one of the most prominent Hindi filmmakers in the 1980s and 1990s. His notable films include Kalicharan (1976), Vishwanath (1978), Karz (1980), Krodhi (1981), Vidhaata (1982), Hero (1983), Meri Jung (1985), Karma (1986), Ram Lakhan (1989), Saudagar (1991), Khalnayak (1993), Pardes (1997), Taal (1999).

In 1982, Ghai founded Mukta Arts, which became a public company in 2000, with Ghai serving as its executive chairman. In 2006, he received the National Film Award for Best Film on Other Social Issues for producing Iqbal, a film addressing social issues. That same year, he established Whistling Woods International, a film and media institution in Mumbai. In 2015, Ghai was honoured with the IIFA Award for Outstanding Contribution to Indian Cinema. His films are noted for their iconic characters, grand sets, dramatic climaxes, and themes of divine justice and duty.

== Early life ==
Ghai was born in Nagpur, Maharashtra, India. His father was a dentist in Delhi. Ghai's father had moved to Delhi from Punjab following the 1947 partition. Ghai graduated in commerce from Rohtak, Haryana, and then went to pursue graduation in Cinema from the Film and Television Institute of India, Pune.

== Career ==
In an interview with Rajya Sabha TV, Ghai recounted that after graduated from FTII, he came to Bombay, but was not allowed to enter any studio as he was unknown. He then read self help books like Dale Carnegie's How to Win friends and influence people, and used techniques given in it to help him try and enter the film industry. At the same time, he learnt of and entered a United Producers Filmfare talent contest. Of the 5,000 participants, three people were selected in it, he, Rajesh Khanna and Dheeraj Kumar. While Khanna received a role soon after, Ghai received a role a year later.

Ghai started his career in Hindi cinema as an actor with small roles in films including Taqdeer (1967) and Aradhana (1969). He was the male lead in the 1970s Umang and Gumraah. His directorial debut was the action thriller Kalicharan (1976) which he obtained through a recommendation by Shatrughan Sinha. Post that he went on to direct Vishwanath in 1978, Gautam Govinda in 1979 and Karz in 1980. Thereafter, he directed the film Krodhi (1981) starring Dharmendra and Zeenat Aman.

In the 1980s and 1990s, he formed a successful collaboration with Dilip Kumar whom he directed in Vidhaata (1982), Karma (1986) and Saudagar (1991), the latter for which he won his first and only Filmfare Award for Best Director. He introduced Jackie Shroff as a leading actor in the action romance Hero (1983) and helped establish Anil Kapoor's rising career with the legal drama Meri Jung (1985). He went on to frequently work with Shroff and Kapoor, casting them together in the films Karma (1986), Ram Lakhan (1989) and Trimurti (1995), the latter which he had produced and it was directed by Mukul S. Anand. His action crime film Khalnayak starring Sanjay Dutt, Madhuri Dixit and Shroff featured the hit songs "Nayak Nahin Khalnayak Hu Main" and the controversial "Choli Ke Peeche Kya Hai".

In 1997, he directed the musical romance Pardes which starred Shahrukh Khan and newcomers Mahima Chaudhry and Apoorva Agnihotri. In 1999, he directed the musical romantic drama Taal which starred Aishwarya Rai, Akshaye Khanna and Anil Kapoor. Both Pardes and Taal were released internationally. His following films were Yaadein (2001) and Kisna (2005). He then took a break from directing and turned producer with films including Aitraaz (2004), Iqbal (2005), 36 China Town (2006) and Apna Sapna Money Money (2006). In 2006, he set up his own film institute Whistling Woods International in Mumbai. The institute trains students in filmmaking: production, direction, cinematography, acting, animation. Ghai has done brief cameos in his directorial ventures.

After a three-year hiatus from directing, he returned in 2008 with Black & White released on 7 March 2008 and, later Yuvvraaj released in November 2008 with collaboration Yash Singhaniya (award-winning journalist and writer). which did not perform well at the box office. A. R. Rahman stated in an interview that Ghai had asked him to use the words "Jai Ho" in a song. Although intended for Yuvraaj, the song resulted in Jai Ho!, featured in Slumdog Millionaire (2008) and won the Academy Award for Best Original Song at the 81st Academy Awards.

At the Cannes International Film Festival in May 2018, Ghai announced that he is co-producing a biopic on Osho Rajneesh along with an Italian production house. The movie would be directed by Lakshen Sucameli.

As of 2016, he has written and directed a total of 16 movies.

=== Advisor ===
Currently, he is also on the Board of Advisors of India's International Movement to Unite Nations (I.I.M.U.N.).

== Personal life ==
In 1970, following a four-year-long courtship, Ghai married Rehana Farooqui, whom he met while he was in FTII in Pune. She is better known as Mukta Ghai. They live in Mumbai along with their daughters, Meghna Ghai Puri and Muskaan Ghai. Meghna is the President of Whistling Woods International Institute.

In 2018, Subhash Ghai was accused of sexual assault by an anonymous woman. The victim, who used to be an assistant of Subash Ghai alleged that he raped her at Fariyas hotel, Lonavala after spiking her drinks with drugs. No Criminal case or FIR was registered in this matter while Ghai denied it strongly, calling it false.

== Awards ==
Year	Award	Category	Film
1992	Filmfare Awards	Best Director	Saudagar
1998	Filmfare Awards	Best Screenplay	Pardes
2022	Filmfare Awards	Lifetime Achievement Award	
2006	National Film Awards	Best Film on Other Social Issues	Iqbal
2015	IIFA Awards	Lifetime Achievement Award	
2015	Business World	Pioneering contribution in the field of Cinema Exhibition	
2017	Screen Awards	Lifetime Achievement Award	
2017	Amar Ujala	Lifetime Excellence	
2018	Economic Times-Edge	Iconic Brand of Indian Cinema	
2019	1st Diorama International Film Festival & Market	Lifetime Achievement Award	
2022	The FilmFare Award	Lifetime Achievement Award	

== Filmography ==
Year	Film	Director	Producer	Screenwriter	Notes
1976	Kalicharan	Yes	No	Yes	
1978	Vishwanath	Yes	No	Yes	
1979	Gautam Govinda	Yes	No	Yes	
1980	Karz	Yes	No	Yes	
1981	Krodhi	Yes	No	Yes	
1982	Vidhaata	Yes	No	Yes	
1983	Hero	Yes	Yes	Yes	
1984	Naan Mahaan Alla	No	No	Yes	
1985	Meri Jung	Yes	No	Yes	
1986	Karma	Yes	Yes	Yes	
1989	Ram Lakhan	Yes	Yes	Yes	
1991	Saudagar	Yes	Yes	Yes	
1993	Khalnayak	Yes	Yes	Yes	
1995	Trimurti	No	Yes	Yes	
1997	Pardes	Yes	Yes	Yes	
1999	Taal	Yes	Yes	Yes	
2001	Yaadein	Yes	Yes	Yes	
2001	Rahul	No	Yes	No	
2003	Ek Aur Ek Gyarah	No	Yes	No	
2003	Joggers' Park	No	Yes	No	
2004	Aitraaz	No	Yes	No	
2005	Kisna	Yes	Yes	Yes	
2005	Iqbal	No	Yes	No	
2006	36 China Town	No	Yes	No	
2006	Shaadi Se Pehle	No	Yes	No	
2006	Apna Sapna Money Money	No	Yes	No	
2007	Good Boy, Bad Boy	No	Yes	No	
2008	Black & White	Yes	Yes	Yes	
2008	Yuvvraaj	Yes	Yes	Yes	
2009	Paying Guests	No	Yes	No	
2010	Right Yaaa Wrong	No	Yes	No	
2011	Love Express	No	Yes	No	
2011	Cycle Kick	No	Yes	No	
2011	Naukadubi	No	Yes	No	Bengali film
2011	Kashmakash	No	Yes	No	
2013	Samhita	No	Yes	No	
2014	Double Di Trouble	No	Yes	No	Punjabi film
2014	Kaanchi	Yes	Yes	Yes	
2014	Nimbehuli	No	Yes	No	Kannada film
2015	Hero	No	Yes	No	
2022	36 Farmhouse	No	Yes	Yes	

=== Acting credits ===
- Aradhana (1969) as Flight Lieutenant Prakash
- Do Bachche Dus Haath (1972) as Inspector Rajesh
- Dhamkee (1973) as CBI Inspector
- Naatak (1975) as Prakash
