= Shital Bhatia =

Indian film producer

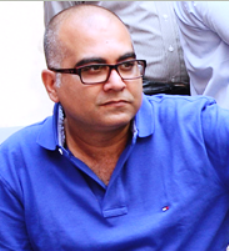
- Born: Shital Bhatia; India
- Occupation: Film Producer
- Organization(s): Friday Filmworks, Friday Storytellers & Bootroom Sports Media LLP

Shital Bhatia is an Indian film producer and co-founder of Friday Filmworks, best known for his movies like A Wednesday! (2008), Special 26 (2013), Baby (2015), M.S. Dhoni: The Untold Story (2016), Rustom (2016) and Toilet: Ek Prem Katha (2017).

Shital Bhatia along with Anil Ambani's Reliance Entertainment have a joint venture named Plan C Studios.

== Early life and education ==
Shital Bhatia was born and brought up in Mumbai. He graduated from Mithibai College with a degree in Bachelors of Commerce. Later on, he went on to do a diploma in Fashion Designing and graduated in the year 1995.

== Career ==
In his early career, Shital started working as a costume/fashion designer for television from the year 1994 and continued working in the same field till 2000.

Very soon, Shital along with his colleague Neeraj Pandey, went on to start a production company called 'Quarter Inch Productions' which produced television shows and television films, Ittefaq being the most popular. Simultaneously, Shital also handled the production of foreign projects for a while in between.

Eventually in 2008, Shital and Neeraj Pandey formed their own production house named Friday Filmworks. Friday Filmworks produced movies like A Wednesday!, Taryanche Bait, Baby (2015 Hindi film), Special 26, M.S. Dhoni: The Untold Story, Toilet: Ek Prem Katha, Aiyaary, Naam Shabana, Rustom, Operation Romeo and upcoming movie Auron Mein Kahan Dum Tha.

Shital Bhatia co-founded Friday Storytellers with his business partner Neeraj Pandey in 2019, to produce content for OTT and digital streaming. Under Friday Storytellers, Shital Bhatia produced Special Ops, Special Ops 1.5, Khakee: The Bihar Chapter, Secrets of Sinauli, Secrets of the Kohinoor, Secrets of the Buddha Relics, Kaun Pravin Tambe?, Bandon Mein Tha Dum!, Hack: Crimes Online, and upcoming Hindi digital film Sikandar Ka Muqaddar as well as web series 'Khakee: The Bengal Chapter' (Netflix) & 'Special OPS 2' (Disney+ Hotstar).

He also produced OUCH, a short film by Neeraj Pandey starring Manoj Bajpayee and Pooja Chopra and Ouch 2 starring Nidhi Bisht, Shefali Jariwala, Sharman Joshi.

Shital Bhatia also co-founded Bootroom Sports Media LLP along with his business partners Neeraj Pandey and Sudip Tewari in March 2022.

== Filmography ==
=== Films ===
Year	Title	Notes
2008	A Wednesday	
2011	Taryanche Bait	
2013	Special 26	
2014	The Royal Bengal Tiger	
2014	Total Siyapaa	
2015	Baby	
2016	Rustom	
2016	M.S. Dhoni: The Untold Story	
2016	Saat Uchakkey	
2016	Ouch (Short Film)	YouTube
2017	Toilet: Ek Prem Katha	
2017	Naam Shabana	
2018	Aiyaary	
2022	Kaun Pravin Tambe?	Disney+ Hotstar
2022	Operation Romeo	
2022	Vikram Vedha	
2022	Saatam Aatham	
2023	Ouch 2 (Short Film)	YouTube
2024	Auron Mein Kahan Dum Tha	
2024	Sikandar Ka Muqaddar	Netflix

=== Television ===
Year	Title	Network	Notes
2020	Special OPS	Disney+ Hotstar	
2021	Special Ops 1.5: The Himmat Story	Disney+ Hotstar	
2022	Khakee: The Bihar Chapter	Netflix	
2023	Hack: Crimes Online	Amazon MiniTV	
2023	The Freelancer	Disney+ Hotstar	
2025	Khakee: The Bengal Chapter	Netflix	
2025	Special OPS 2	Disney+ Hotstar	
2026	Taskaree	Netflix	

=== Documentary ===
Year	Title	Network
2021	Secrets of Sinauli: Discovery of the Century	Discovery+
2022	Bandon Mein Tha Dum!	Jio Cinema
2022	Secrets of the Koh-i-noor	Discovery+
2024	Secrets of the Buddha Relics	Discovery+

== Awards ==
- 2008: A Wednesday - Star Screen Award
