= Aiyaary =

2018 film by Neeraj Pandey

- Theatrical release poster
- Directed by: Neeraj Pandey
- Written by: Neeraj Pandey
- Based on: Adarsh Housing Society scam
- Produced by: Shital Bhatia; Dhaval Jayantilal Gada; Aksshay Jayantilal Gada; Motion Picture Capital 11
- Starring: Sidharth Malhotra; Manoj Bajpayee; Rakul Preet Singh; Pooja Chopra; Adil Hussain; Kumud Mishra; Naseeruddin Shah; Anupam Kher
- Cinematography: Sudheer Palsane
- Edited by: Praveen Kathikuloth
- Music by: Score: Sanjoy Chowdhury; Songs: Rochak Kohli; Ankit Tiwari
- Production companies: Motion Picture Capital 11; Friday Filmworks; Pen Studios; Plan C Studios
- Distributed by: Reliance Entertainment
- Release date: 16 February 2018
- Running time: 160 minutes
- Country: India
- Language: Hindi
- Budget: ₹65 crore
- Box office: ₹34.07 crore

Aiyaary (transl. Shapeshifting) is a 2018 Indian Hindi-language spy thriller film written and directed by Neeraj Pandey and produced by Motion Picture Capital 11, Plan C Studios, Friday Filmworks and Pen India Limited, with Reliance Entertainment serving as distributor and presenter. The film stars Sidharth Malhotra, Manoj Bajpayee, Rakul Preet Singh, Pooja Chopra, Adil Hussain, Kumud Mishra, Naseeruddin Shah, and Anupam Kher. Loosely inspired by the Adarsh Housing society scam, the film follows an Indian Army officer who attempts to stop his rogue protégé from exposing his covert operations and intelligence unit.

Initially rescheduled from 26 January to 9 February to yet another week, it was released on 16 February 2018 to mixed-negative reviews from critics and emerged as a box-office disaster.

== Plot ==
During a surveillance in South Block, New Delhi, Major Jai Bakshi overhears a conversation between Retired Lt. Gen. Gurinder Singh, an Indian Arms Lobby representative, and the Army Chief, Gen. Pratap Malik. Gurinder tries to bribe him 2.5 million dollars on behalf of a Czech firm, under the pretext of them providing state-of-the-art weapons to the Indian Army and opening a fund for war widows, but when Malik does not comply, he threatens to expose Data & Systems Diagnostics (DSD), a confidential unit carrying out secret operations in different countries, which Jai is a part of. Suspecting a major scam in the army, Jai continues with the surveillance for 2 months before going rogue with his cyber-expert girlfriend, Sonia, taking along information related to his organization.

Colonel Abhay Singh, Jai's mentor, learns of this and decides to pursue Jai, while he himself is pursued secretly by Officer Brig. Srinivas, who reports his movements to Gurinder. After a meeting with Malik, who explains to him about the real culprit and a powerful arms dealer named Mukesh Kapoor, Abhay finds his car pursued and manages to escape, while the pursuers sent by Srinivas keep following the car. The DSD shifts their location to an undisclosed location, and Gurinder enlists the help of a journalist named Kamya and provides her with sensitive information that can expose the army's secrets. Abhay flies to London, and so does a disguised Jai, who is picked up by Sonia upon his arrival.

In London, Jai manages to frighten Gurinder into transferring all his money into Jai's account while Abhay meets Tariq, a middle-man for Intelligence agents, who arranges guns and tries to locate Jai and Sonia, eventually alerting Jai. A desperate Abhay meets Mukesh and tells him his agents have captured Gurinder. He makes a deal with him, telling him to kill Jai and Sonia in exchange for the information he possesses as it threatens both parties. While Jai is en route to meet an MI-6 agent to sell him the information, Mukesh's sniper tries to kill him. A few agents are killed, and Jai is wounded, but manages to escape. Abhay picks up Sonia and calls Jai from her phone, telling him to come to a spot. Jai arrives, but is repeatedly punched by Abhay, who then holds him at gunpoint while Jai justifies his actions and questions what the elder generation plans to leave for the present one.

Realizing he still holds him in high regard, Abhay agree with Jai, subsequently picking up a call from Mukesh at Jai's insistence. Jai asks Mukesh to free Tariq in exchange for all the information Jai would personally deliver to him. Abhay heads back to India, disguised, where he follows Jai's instructions and meets Baburao, an old man living with his adopted dog Babloo, who reveals information about an army housing scam in Mumbai, involving Gurinder and the Defence Minister. Abhay records his statement and hands it over to Kamya, his ex-girlfriend, who decides to play it after listening to Baburao's words. Gurinder, rescued by Srinivas after capturing DSD agents, receives the same audio recording and shoots himself after listening to it.

The housing scam is exposed, due to which Srinivas is forced to free the captured DSD agents. The Indian Army and DSD's reputation is saved, while Jai goes to meet Mukesh. Right before entering the building, as he is being watched by Mukesh's agent, Jai decides not to hand over the information and disappears as a bus passes. Mukesh decides to let everything go, while Jai reunites with Abhay after 2 months.

== Cast ==
- Sidharth Malhotra as Major Jai Bakshi / Abhimanyu Singh (Fake) (Intelligence Corps)
- Manoj Bajpayee as Colonel Abhay Singh (Intelligence Corps)
- Rakul Preet Singh as Sonia Gupta
- Pooja Chopra as Captain Maya Semwal (Intelligence Corps)
- Adil Hussain as Colonel Mukesh Kapoor (Retd.)
- Kumud Mishra as Lieutenant General Gurinder Singh (Retd.)
- Naseeruddin Shah as Baburao Shastri
- Anupam Kher as Tariq Ali
- Nivedita Bhattacharya as Kamya
- Kali Prasad Mukherjee as Bhima
- Vikram Gokhale as General Pratap Malik, (Chief of the Army Staff)
- Rajesh Tailang as Brigadier K. Srinivas
- Juhi Babbar as Colonel Abhay Singh's wife
- Maan Praveen Sirohi as Lieutenant Colonel Aubin Mathew (Intelligence Corps)
- Patrick Clarke as Roger

== Production ==
The film was announced in April 2017. It was shot in Delhi, London, Kashmir, Cairo, Agra and more. Some of its scenes were also shot in the premises of Galgotias Campus One. Aiyaary is directed by Neeraj Pandey.

== Music ==
Aiyaary

Soundtrack album by Rochak Kohli, Ankit Tiwari
- Released: 1 February 2018
- Genre: Feature film soundtrack
- Length: 17:15
- Language: Hindi
- Label: Zee Music Company
- Producer: TIPS Film Ramesh Tourani

Rochak Kohli chronology
Tanu Weds Manu Returns (2015)	Aiyaary (2018)	Sonu Ke Titu Ki Sweety (2018)

Ankit Tiwari chronology
Guddu Rangeela (2015)	Aiyaary (2018)	Raazi (2018)

Official audio
- Aiyaary - Full Movie Audio Jukebox on YouTube

The music of the film is composed by Rochak Kohli and Ankit Tiwari while lyrics are penned by Manoj Muntashir. The background score is composed by Sanjoy Chowdhury. The songs are sung by Sunidhi Chauhan, Palak Muchhal, Ankit Tiwari, Amit Mishra, Neha Bhasin and Rochak Kohli. The first song of the film, Lae Dooba, which is sung by Sunidhi Chauhan, was released on 29 December 2017. The second track of the film, Yaad Hai, which is sung by Palak Muchhal and Ankit Tiwari, was released on 17 January 2018. The third track of the film to be released was Shuru Kar which is sung by Amit Mishra, Neha Bhasin and Rochak Kohli and was released on 25 January 2018. The music album of the film includes 4 tracks and was released on 1 February 2018 at YouTube by Zee Music Company.

Track listing
No.	Title	Music	Singer(s)	Length
1.	"Lae Dooba"	Rochak Kohli	Sunidhi Chauhan	3:50
2.	"Yaad Hai"	Ankit Tiwari	Palak Muchhal, Ankit Tiwari	5:20
3.	"Shuru Kar"	Rochak Kohli	Amit Mishra, Neha Bhasin & Rochak Kohli	4:03
4.	"Lae Dooba"	Rochak Kohli	Asees Kaur	2:11
Total length:				15:24

== Release ==
=== Theatrical ===
The film was originally scheduled to be released on 26 January 2018, but this was moved in order to avoid a clash with Padmaavat. The film was then scheduled to be released worldwide on 9 February 2018 but was later postponed to 16 February 2018.

It was banned by the Pakistan Central Board of Film Censors for portraying Pakistan in a negative light.

=== Home media ===
The film was released on DVD by Reliance Home Video & Games. The satellite rights were secured by Star Gold while the digital streaming rights went over to Netflix, where the film was released uncensored.

== Reception ==
=== Critical response ===
The film received mixed-to-negative reviews from critics. On review aggregator website Rotten Tomatoes, the film holds a rotten score of 20% based on 10 reviews with an average rating of 4.1/10.

Alaka Sahani of Indian Express gave the film a rating of 2.5 stars out of 5 and said that "Even though the movie puts together an impressive ensemble cast comprising some of our best actors, it takes a lot of time to establish their characters. A veteran in Neeraj Pandey movies, Manoj Bajpayee carries the film on his shoulders." Bollywood Hungama gave the film a rating of 2 stars out of 5 and wrote "On the whole, AIYAARY misses the mark and is a huge letdown on account of its flawed script and the lengthy runtime. At the box office, it will be a disappointing fare." Saibal Chatterjee of NDTV criticized the film, saying that, "Aiyaary, comatose and convoluted, is like a patient who's been wheeled in on a stretcher and declared dead on arrival. It never manages to get up on its feet and break into a saunter, let alone a sprint." and gave the film a rating of 1.5 stars out of 5. Rohit Vats of Hindustan Times gave the film a rating of 1 star out of 5 and said that, "Aiyaary is sketchily-written and not compelling. It tests patience even if you are a fan of the genre."

Shrishti Negi of News 18 gave the film a rating of 1.5 stars out of 5 and said that, "Unlike Pandey's other films, there is a nonsense of flatness in Aiyaary. Apart from a few scenes, the movie seems to be randomly constructed and fails to evoke any thrill."

== See also ==
- Adarsh Housing Society scam
- Tatra Truck scam
