= Plan C Studios =

Indian motion picture production company

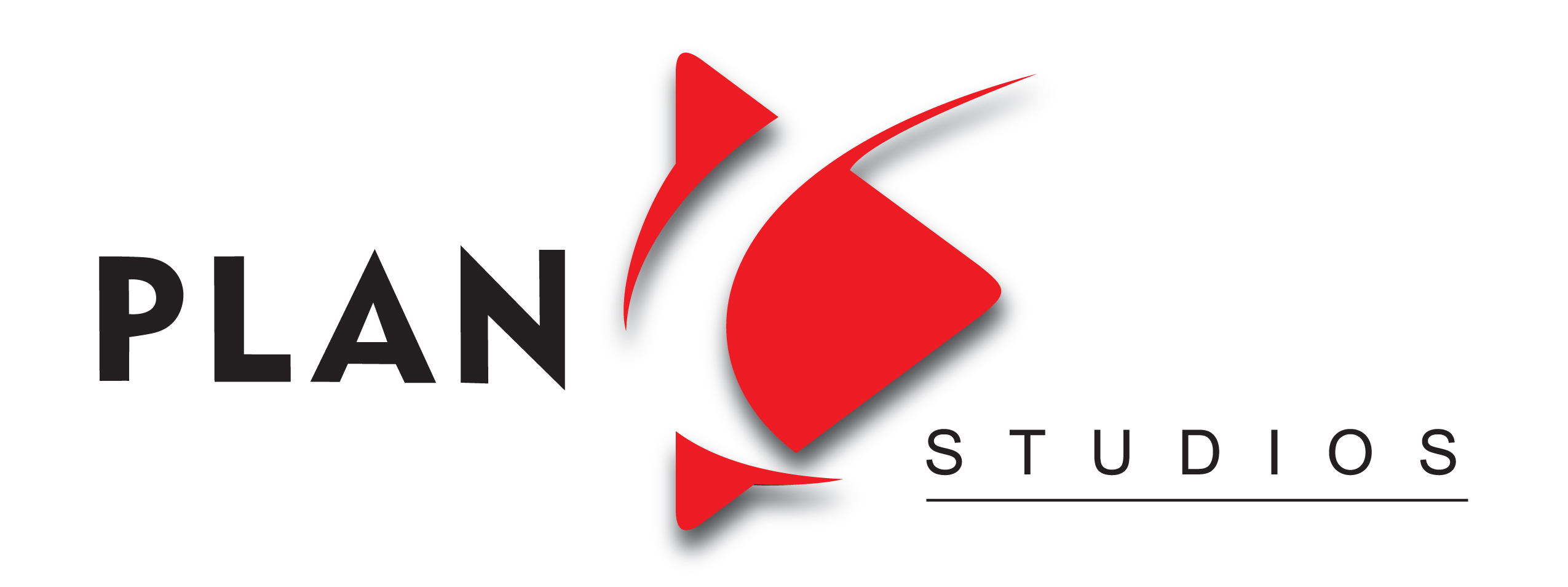
- Company type: Private
- Industry: Film production
- Genre: historical period drama; thriller; action; comedy; drama; crime
- Founded: 2 December 2015 (10 years ago) at Mumbai, Maharashtra, India
- Founders: Anil Ambani; Neeraj Pandey; Shital Bhatia
- Headquarters: Mumbai, India
- Key people: Ambani; Pandey; Bhatia
- Products: Rustom; Naam Shabana; Toilet: Ek Prem Katha; Aiyaary
- Production output: 4 films (2018)
- Services: Entertainment
- Owners: Ambani (50%); Pandey and Bhatia (50%)
- Website: twitter.com/planc_studios

Plan C Studios is an Indian motion picture production company founded as an alliance between Anil Ambani’s Reliance Entertainment and Neeraj Pandey and Shital Bhatia’s Friday Filmworks. It is the result of a 50:50 joint venture between the two production houses.

Plan C Studios made waves in the Indian film industry by launching its first production, Akshay Kumar starrer Rustom (film) which released on 12 August 2016. Subsequent productions include Naam Shabana (a prequel to Pandey's 2015 film Baby) which was released on 31 March 2017.

Toilet: Ek Prem Katha, starring Akshay Kumar and Bhumi Pednekar was released worldwide on 11 August 2017. It is a love story with a satirical flavor directed by Shree Narayan Singh and produced by Aruna Bhatia, Plan C Studios and Abundantia. It is presented by Viacom 18 and KriArj Entertainment.

Aiyaary, starring Sidharth Malhotra and Manoj Bajpayee was released on 16 February 2018.

== Filmography ==
Year	Film	Director	Language	Notes
2016	Rustom	Tinu Suresh Desai	Hindi	
2017	Naam Shabana	Shivam Nair	Hindi	
2017	Toilet: Ek Prem Katha	Shree Narayan Singh	Hindi	
2018	Aiyaary	Neeraj Pandey	Hindi	
2022	Operation Romeo (film)	Shashant Shah	Hindi	Remake of Malayalam film Ishq:Not A Love Story
