= Khakee: The Bengal Chapter =

Indian crime thriller television series (2025)

- Genre: Crime drama Action; Thriller
- Created by: Neeraj Pandey
- Written by: Neeraj Pandey; Debatma Mandal; Samrat Chakraborty
- Directed by: Debatma Mandal; Tushar Kanti Ray
- Starring: Jeet; Prosenjit Chatterjee; Saswata Chatterjee; Ritwik Bhowmik; Chitrangada Singh; Nyra Banerjee
- Music by: Songs: Jeet Gannguli; Background score: Sanjoy Chowdhury
- Country of origin: India
- Original language: Hindi
- No. of episodes: 7

Production
- Producer: Shital Bhatia
- Cinematography: Tushar Kanti Ray; Arvind Singh; Tarashree Sahoo; Souvik Basu
- Editor: Praveen Kathikuloth
- Camera setup: Multi-camera
- Running time: 50 minutes
- Production company: Friday Storytellers

Original release
- Network: Netflix
- Release: 20 March 2025

Related
- Khakee: The Bihar Chapter

Khakee: The Bengal Chapter is a 2025 Indian Hindi-language period political thriller television series created by Neeraj Pandey. It is directed by Debatma Mandal and Tushar Kanti Ray, and co-written by Pandey, Mandal and Samrat Chakraborty. Produced by Shital Bhatia under the banner of Friday Storytellers, the series features an ensemble cast including Prosenjit Chatterjee, Jeet, Saswata Chatterjee, Ritwik Bhowmik, Chitrangada Singh, Mahaakshay Chakraborty and Aadil Zafar Khan, with Parambrata Chatterjee appearing in a special role.

A standalone sequel to Khakee: The Bihar Chapter, the series features a soundtrack composed by Jeet Gannguli, while Sanjoy Salil Chowdhury provided the background score.

The series premiered on Netflix on 20 March 2025. It is the first Bengali-origin show to stream on Netflix and also marks the Hindi-language debut of Jeet. The series received mixed-to-positive reviews from critics and was well received by audiences.

== Synopsis ==
Shankar Baruah aka Bagha, a Kolkata based don, close to ruling party of West Bengal is involved in all unlawful activities in Kolkata region and opposition party raise their voice against ruling party run Government on lawlessness in Kolkata. Ruling party appoints a clean record Police officer, named Saptarshi Sinha, to show government action on Bagha by some raids and arrests. Bagha used to get information of raids through Barun Roy, key people of ruling party. But that police officer is killed by Bagha's gang member Sagor Talukdar and Ranjit Thakur. Murder of a senior Police officer becomes a matter of shame for ruling party in State of West Bengal. Bagha along with his gang members becomes underground along his gang & maintaining telephonic conversation with Barun Roy. In the meantime, Barun Roy discloses Bagha's location to Sagor and Ranjit. Government brings Arjun Maitra as head of SIT, he tries to crack down on Bagha. But Bagha was found dead and government proved their credibility to people. But here the story has twist. Maitra is transferred as security to Chief Minister Shirshendu Das for violation orders from top. He explores a nexus between police officials, politicians, businessmen and underworld. He implements strategies to divide Sagor and Ranjit. Finally Maitra becomes successful to break the nexus.

== Cast ==
- Prosenjit Chatterjee as Barun Roy, a high rank politician of the Ruling Party
- Jeet as IPS Arjun Maitra
- Chitrangada Singh as Nibedita Basak, the Leader of Opposition in West Bengal
- Ritwik Bhowmik as Sagor Talukdar
- Aadil Zafar Khan as Ranjit Thakur
- Saswata Chatterjee as Shankar Baruah "Bagha", a gangster
- Pallavi Chatterjee as Somnath's mother
- Subhasish Mukherjee as Dr. Shirshendu Chatterjee, Chief Minister of West Bengal
- Mahaakshay Chakraborty as SIT Officer Himel Majumder
- Pooja Chopra as Dr. Khushi Maitra, Arjun's wife
- Aakanksha Singh as SIT Officer Aratrika Bhowmick
- Nyra Banerjee as Rekha Sinha, Saptarshi Sinha's wife
- Shraddha Das as Saumya Mukherjee
- Joy Sengupta as DIG Bhaskar Bhattacharya
- Sandeep Chatterjee as Politician Pal
- Nilanjan Datta as Romesh Mukherjee Inspector of Police
- Chhandak Chowdhury as SIT Officer Abhirup Tapadar
- Pratim Ganguly as Manik
- Shruti Das as Manjula Talukdar, Sagor's wife
- Sumit Ganguly as Aslam Shera of Burrabazar area
- Shweta Mishra as Deepa, Sagor's sister
- Tenzin Bodh as Cheena, Bagha's son
- Amika Shail as miththu

=== Special appearances ===
- Parambrata Chatterjee as IPS Saptarshi Sinha

== Episodes ==
No.	Title	Directed by	Written by	Original release date
1	"City of Joy"	Debatma Mandal	Samrat Chakroborty, Neeraj Pandey	March 20, 2025
When a kidnapping forces politician Barun Roy to take action against Bagha, a dangerous don, he hires the best man for the job — Officer Saptarshi Sinha.
2	"Gurudakshina"	Tushar Kanti Ray	Samrat Chakroborty, Neeraj Pandey	March 20, 2025
Steely cop Arjun Maitra takes over Bagha’s case. Opposition leader Nibedita Basak demands justice for Saptarshi’s fate. Barun has an offer for Sagor.
3	"Jay-Veeru"	Debatma Mandal	Samrat Chakroborty, Neeraj Pandey	March 20, 2025
As Nibedita visits a figure from her past, Arjun receives unsettling intel from a mysterious informant. The authorities want Arjun out of their way.
4	"Rakshabandhan"	Tushar Kanti Ray	Samrat Chakroborty, Neeraj Pandey	March 20, 2025
Arjun receives a promotion while Sagor gets ready to make his political debut. An enraged Ranjit commits an unthinkable crime.
5	"City of Bhoy"	Debatma Mandal	Samrat Chakroborty, Neeraj Pandey	March 20, 2025
A grief-stricken Sagor goes on a brutal rampage. Arjun is reinstated as the head of the SIT to put an end to Sagor’s crimes.
6	"The Mole"	Tushar Kanti Ray	Samrat Chakroborty, Neeraj Pandey	March 20, 2025
Sagor’s incriminating “insurance” video is brought into play. Ranjit goes to meet Sagor. Arjun learns the shocking identity of the mole within the SIT.
7	"Lanka Dahan"	Debatma Mandal	Samrat Chakroborty, Neeraj Pandey	March 20, 2025
Arjun learns more about the mole within his force. As Ranjit devises an escape plan with Nibedita, Arjun tries to stop him all for one.

== Production ==
=== Development and announcement ===
The world of Khakee has always been about larger-than-life conflicts, high-stakes drama, and nuanced characters that redefine the lines between good and evil. With Khakee: The Bengal Chapter, we take this intensity to a new level. Set against the vivid backdrop of Kolkata, this chapter delves into gripping power struggles and follows a relentless IPS officer who dares to challenge the system. The entire ensemble cast has delivered exceptional performances, ensuring that Khakee: The Bengal Chapter is an evolution of the beloved narrative.

— Neeraj Pandey, during an interview with The Indian Express

Khakee: The Bengal Chapter marks the third collaboration between Jeet and Pandey, after The Royal Bengal Tiger and Chengiz, both of which had Pandey's contribution as a writer, the former starring Jeet in a cameo appearance and the later in a lead role. The former was also produced by Shital Bhatia, who has also produced this show. Jeet and Chatterjee have dubbed for their portions in Bengali.

It also marks the Hindi debut of Jeet as well as his first web series. Jeet and Chatterjee had previously starred in the 2018 anthology film, Bagh Bandi Khela, in which they didn't share screen. The series was announced on 29th February 2024 along with a bunch of other upcoming Netflix web series, which were slated to release in 2024 and 2025. In an interview with India Today, the makers mentioned that Pandey decided to make a second part of Khakee, emboldened by the success of the first part. It also marked the web series debut of Chitrangada Singh.

Neeraj Pandey revealed in an interview with Mid-Day that the series will exclusively focus on the "pada" culture which is existent in West Bengal. He stated, while each state has a different "pada" culture, Kolkata has a "pada" culture, very different from the other states. In Bengal, the "pada" culture refers to a neighborhood club system that has transitioned from organising blood donation camps to becoming the state government's party level foot soldiers. He also added that while Khakee: The Bihar Chapter was adapted, the Bengal Chapter will be more fictional.

=== Casting ===
"As someone who has always been passionate about thrillers and cop dramas, Khakee as a franchise is definitely one of my favourites. So when Netflix approached me, I was excited to collaborate with them for the newest instalment of Khakee - The Bengal Chapter, in the capacity of a superfan. The series has been extensively shot in Kolkata and the gripping narrative and stellar performances make it a must-watch for anyone who appreciates a well-made thriller."

— Sourav Ganguly, in an interview speaking about his collaboration with Khakee: The Bengal Chapter.

Khakee: The Bengal Chapter brought together Jeet and Chatterjee for the first time on screen. Accompanied by Parambrata and Saswata, it marked the largest casting of major Bengali actors together. In March 2025, there were rumours that the ace Indian cricketer Sourav Ganguly will do a cameo in the film, after his photos in police uniform went viral on the internet. But he denied all the rumours and stated that he will not be acting in the film. On 17 March 2025, Netflix released a promotional video featuring Sourav Ganguly, referring him by his monickers "Dada" and the "Prince of Kolkata". The video revealed a few backstage shots of him doing a few action scenes and concluded that Ganguly will not act, but will be a part of the marketing for the series.

Shruti Das of X=Prem fame, joined the shoot in Kolkata in July 2024. Parambrata Chatterjee mentioned in an interview that he had decided to not play any cop roles in future as he had already played a cop in many films. But he accepted to play a cop in this because, in his words "Before Khakee was offered to me, I had firmly decided that if I played a cop one more time, I’d have to change my name from Param to Iftikhar, after the legendary 1960s actor known for his iconic police roles. When Khakee came from Neeraj sir, there was no question of saying no, even if it meant renaming myself! Another big reason for saying yes was Netflix."

=== Filming ===
The filming has been done extensively in Kolkata with a few scenes shot in Mumbai. After completing the Mumbai schedule by early 2024, the Bengal schedule was shot in July and August 2024. Major scenes have been shot at Prinsep Ghat, Vidyasagar Setu, Howrah Bridge, settlements on the banks of Hooghly River, Burdwan Rajbati, Tiretta Bazaar, Tollygunge Club, Park Street, Chowringhee Road and Kidderpore. In an interview, Neeraj Pandey expalained that he chose Kolkata after showcasing Bihar in the maiden part of the Khakee series as it was a way for him to remember his childhood, since he was born and brought up in Kolkata. He wanted to display the political turmoil and the then ongoing gang wars in the city in the early 2000s. He specifically mentioned that the series had nothing to do with the ongoing political and crime scenario in Bengal.

=== Marketing ===
The teaser of the web series was released on 3 February 2025. The trailer of the web series was unveiled at an event on 5 March 2025. As a part of the promotional campaign, the team paid tribute to the iconic Kolkata tram during a part of the event. On 12 March 2025, Netflix dropped a character teaser of Jeet as Arjun Maitra, a no-nonsense IPS officer. On 15 March 2025, Netflix released a character of promo of Prosenjit Chatterjee as Barun Roy, a ruthless politician.

On 17 March 2025, Netflix released a promotional video featuring Sourav Ganguly, referring him by his monikers "Dada" and "Prince of Kolkata". The video revealed that he will not act in the series, but will be a part of the marketing.

== Reception ==
=== Critical reception ===
Rahul Desai of The Hollywood Reporter India reviewed the series and termed it as "A Crime Drama That’s More Algorithm Than Rhythm."

Zinia Bandyopadhyay of India Today rated the series 3.5/5 stars and highlighted "Khakee: The Bengal Chapter is an engrossing, binge-worthy crime thriller that you might find yourself finishing in one sitting. With gripping thrills, stellar performances, and a well-paced narrative, it is a good watch for those who enjoy the genre." A critic from Bollywood Hungama rated the series 3.5/5 stars and wrote "On the whole, Khakee: The Bengal Chapter is a gripping thriller that works due to the subject, ensemble cast, gritty narrative and plenty of twists and turns." A critic from The Statesman opined "With Chitrangda Singh’s stellar performance, a top-tier supporting cast, and Neeraj Pandey’s masterful direction, ‘Khakee: The Bengal Chapter’ is a must-watch crime thriller."

Sonal Pandya of Times Now rated the series 3.5/5 stars and noted "However, despite the engaging political twists that play like a needle drop at the end of every episode, Khakee: The Bengal Chapter is unnecessarily violent. The action sequences too are a bit unconvincing, focusing more on gore. The central conflict of The Bengal Chapter about the blurring lines between good and bad is what keeps one hooked at the end of the day." Troy Ribeiro of The Free Press Journal rated the series 3.5/5 stars and opined "The narrative's ambition is one of its most striking qualities, embracing a non-linear structure that adds depth and intrigue. The tonal shifts, rather than detracting, offer a varied emotional experience, ensuring that the series remains unpredictable and engaging throughout. Overall, this series is a gritty exploration of crime and consequence, anchored by strong performances and rich production values."

Lachmi Deb Roy of Firstpost rated the series 3/5 stars and wrote "Khakee: The Bengal Chapter is not only a storm, but I just hope that it is able to bring Bengal cinema back on the global map. We indeed have a huge talent in Bengal, just that they need the right break and make cinema from this state as popular as it was. The seven-episode web series is immersive, engaging and dark… in fact very dark." Sugandha Rawal of Hindustan Times reviewed the series and remarked "Second chapter of Neeraj Pandey’s franchise doesn’t start on a promising note. However, it picks up the pace in the middle. Khakee: The Bengal Chapter offers a rare glimpse into a lesser-known facet of West Bengal through powerful performances from regional artists. It's worth watching for crime drama enthusiasts seeking something beyond the usual fare."

Abhishek rivastava of Moneycontrol rated the series 3/5 stars and highlighted "‘Khakee: The Bengal Chapter’ blends politics and crime but struggles with predictability. Despite strong performances, its weak screenplay prevents it from being truly compelling. The series builds intrigue but fails to capitalize on key plot points, making it an entertaining yet ultimately forgettable watch." Shubham Kulkarni of OTTplay rated the series 3/5 stars and opined "Khakee: The Bengal Chapter is Neeraj Pandey’s attempt to reveal a hidden side of Kolkata. While the drama is engaging, the series sometimes feels repetitive, as it follows a formula that’s already been heavily used in Indian streaming content. The overdose of the crime genre on streaming platforms weakens what could have been a truly standout Netflix outing."

Sakshi Verma of India TV rated the series 3/5 stars and wrote "Khakee: The Bengal Chapter series is good, but the story is not new. We have way too many times seen a lot of politics and crime combo. However, the Bengali ground in the series and be new for some. The action is good but slow-mo sequences can annoy you. The series is filled with fresh and lesser-seen faces. But, despite being predictable, the series keeps you hooked and the twists keep you invested." Gaurang Chauhan of MensXP rated the series 3/5 stars and noted "Khakee: The Bengal Chapter is an entertaining watch that will keep you engaged and hooked throughout its narrative. Despite many flaws, the show is worth watching for its great star cast. The screenplay of the show is predictable and the narrative is familiar but what elevates this show is the direction, the cinematography and the great star cast."

Archika Khurana of the Times of India rated the series 3/5 stars and wrote "Despite its intense action sequences and political intrigue, Khakee: The Bengal Chapter struggles to break free from crime thriller clichés. While strong performances from the cast elevate the series, its predictable storytelling and lack of narrative depth prevent it from being truly memorable." Devesh Sharma of Filmfare opined "Ultimately, while Khakee: The Bengal Chapter has its moments, it falls short of being a classic cops vs mafia drama, leaving viewers wanting more from what could have been a compelling story." Anuj Kumar of The Hindu reviewed the film and expressed "Some sharp twists and dramatic turns by Prosenjit Chatterjee and Saswata Chatterjee can’t salvage this reductive exploration of gore and grunge in Bengal."

Saibal Chatterjee of NDTV rated the series 2.5/5 stars and opined "It is the principal actors (all of whom deliver the goods), the background score by Sanjoy Chowdhury, the title track composed by Jeet Gannguli (whose lyrics change from episode to episode) and the lingo (a freewheeling mix of Bengali, Hindi, English and street patois) that help the series strike roots in the milieu it plays out in. Shubhra Gupta of The Indian Express rated the series 2/5 stars and highlighted "A promising start quickly descends into predictability. The beats are familiar, the character types are even more so. Apart from the fact that the faces are mostly Bengali actors — some familiar, some not so — Khakee The Bengal Chapter comes off as same old."

Shomini Sen of WION reviewed the series and wrote "The seven-part series is earnest even though predictable. I do wish they had dwelled deeper in Bengal polictis, which in reality, is never debvoid of thrills and drama. Khakee: The Bengal Chapter, ultimately works for its actors and not so much for its predictable story." Deepa Gahlot of Scroll.in reviewed the series and noted "Although in spirit like numerous cop-gangster-politician nexus films and shows, what makes The Bengal Chapter several degrees superior is its cultural specificity. The scenes between the violent interludes – the relationships and interactions between various characters – are thoughtfully written. Jeet is a good casting choice. He has an almost avuncular expression, but also the hawkish sharpness that does not miss anything. Despite overused crime show tropes, The Bengal Chapter has attention to detail as well as elements of unpredictability."

== Awards ==
IWM BUZZ Digital Awards 2025

- Most Popular Actor in a Web Series - Jeet
- Most Popular Actor in a Negative Character in a Web Series - Prosenjit Chatterjee
- Most Versatile Actor - Ritwik Bhowmik
- Best Negative Role in a Web Series (Male) - Aadil Zafar Khan

== See also ==
- List of Netflix India originals
- List of Netflix original programming
