= Batti Gul Meter Chalu =

2018 Indian film by Shree Narayan Singh

- Theatrical release poster
- Directed by: Shree Narayan Singh
- Written by: Siddharth–Garima
- Story by: Vipul K Rawal
- Produced by: Nitin Chandrachud; Shree Narayan Singh; Kusum Arora; Nishant Pitti
- Starring: Shahid Kapoor; Shraddha Kapoor; Yami Gautam; Divyendu Sharma
- Cinematography: Anshuman Mahaley
- Edited by: Shree Narayan Singh
- Music by: Score: Vijay Verma; Anamik & Lyton; Songs: Anu Malik; Rochak Kohli; Sachet–Parampara
- Production companies: T-Series Films; KriArj Entertainment
- Distributed by: AA Films (India); Eros International (Overseas)
- Release date: 21 September 2018
- Running time: 161 minutes
- Country: India
- Language: Hindi
- Box office: est. ₹56 crore

Batti Gul Meter Chalu (transl. Lights off, meter on; Hindi pronunciation: [bət̪t̪iː gʊl miːʈəɾ tʃaːluː]) is a 2018 Indian Hindi-language legal drama film directed by Shree Narayan Singh, written by Siddharth–Garima and produced by T-Series and KriArj Entertainment. The film tells the story of inflated electricity bills in rural India. It stars Shahid Kapoor, Shraddha Kapoor, Yami Gautam and Divyendu Sharma.

Principal photography commenced in February 2018 in Tehri, Uttarakhand and was completed in July 2018. The film was released worldwide on 21 September 2018 and received negative reviews from critics who criticised the execution and running time, but praised its message, humour, cast performances and cinematography.

== Plot ==
Sushil Kumar "S.K." Pant, Lalita "Nauti" Nautiyal and Sundar Mohan Tripathi are childhood friends based in Tehri, Uttarakhand. S.K. is an unscrupulous lawyer making money from out-of-court settlements. Nauti is an over the top fashion designer who thinks highly of herself. Wanting to get married, she decides to date both her childhood friends, each for a week. Things turn sour as S.K catches Nauti and Tripathi kissing. Heartbroken, he starts taunting and avoiding them.

Tripathi's small town printing press is charged with an inflated electricity bill of ₹150,000 (US$1,600), which escalates to ₹5.4 million (US$58,000) in the following months. He along with Nauti visit S.K for a solution, but instead, he insults them. With nowhere to go, Tripathi commits suicide. S.K is taken aback by the events and has a change of heart. He decides to fight out against SPTL, the privatised electricity company responsible for the inflated bills. SPTL has Gulnaar Rizvi as their lawyer against SK for the case.

On the last sitting of case with S.K about to win, Tripathi resurfaces and reveals about his suicide attempt and his struggles regarding inflated bills. The Court clears Tripathi's bill and cancels SPTL's License. It also orders them to pay Tripathi ₹1 million (US$11,000), and others ₹40,000 (US$430) with similar complaints as a compensation. Tripathi is sentenced to six months of simple imprisonment for trying to dupe insurance company with his fake death. Gulnaar and S.K. are shown to be dating post the case.

== Cast ==
- Shahid Kapoor as Sushil Kumar "SK" Pant
- Shraddha Kapoor as Lalita "Nauti" Nautiyal
- Yami Gautam as Advocate Gulnaar Rizvi
- Divyendu Sharma as Sundar Mohan Tripathi / Ratul Gupta (fake)
- Farida Jalal as Lalita's grandmother
- Sushmita Mukherjee as Judge
- Samir Soni as Sanjay Bhaduriya, SPTL owner
- Rajendra Chawla as Janak Khanduri, complaint officer
- Sukhvinder Chahal as Pankaj Bahuguna, SPTL official
- Sudhir Pandey as D.N Pant, SK's father
- Supriya Pilgaonkar as Beena Nautiyal, Lalita's mother
- Atul Srivastava as Murarilal Tripathi, Sundar's father
- Anushka Ranjan as Rita Tripathi, Sundar's sister
- Brijendra Kala as Deendayal Gangotri Travels owner
- Badrul Islam as Kalyan
- Sharib Hashmi as Vikas
- Mukesh S Bhatt as Upreti
- Anna Ador as Ariana

== Production ==
=== Filming ===
Principal photography began in February 2018 with Shahid Kapoor and Shraddha Kapoor in Tehri, Uttarakhand. The first and second schedule of the film got wrapped in February 2018 and March 2018 respectively. Since, KriArj Entertainment, which was producing the film firstly got into financial troubles, the shoot of the film was kept on a halt, which finally got resumed in May 2018 and was wrapped up in June 2018. After the final schedule in July 2018, the film was finally wrapped up in the same month.

=== Casting ===
Director Shree Narayan Singh had already signed Shahid Kapoor to play a lawyer fighting against Faulty Electricity Meters and Inflated Bills in a local town of Uttarakhand. Later, Yami Gautam was signed as an opposition lawyer against Shahid Kapoor in the film. For the role of Lalita Nautiyal a.k.a. Nauti, actresses like Katrina Kaif, Ileana D'Cruz and Sonakshi Sinha were approached but later, it was confirmed that Shraddha Kapoor would be playing this role in the film.

== Marketing and release ==
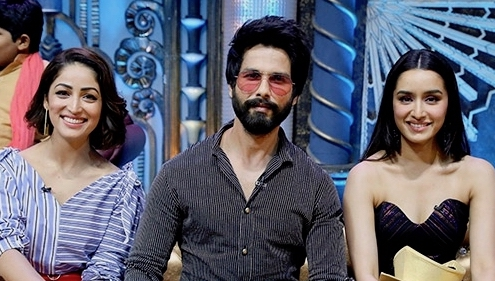
Yami Gautam, Shahid Kapoor and Shraddha Kapoor promoting the film

The film was originally slated to release on 31 August 2018 but was pushed to 14 September 2018 to avoid the clash with Shraddha Kapoor's other film, Stree starring Rajkummar Rao. The financial troubles faced by KriArj Entertainment lead to delays in the shooting of the film.

Later, it was announced that the film would have a worldwide release on 21 September 2018. The teaser of the film was released by T-Series on 18 October 2017. The trailer of the movie was released on 10 August 2018. Following a special screening on 20 September attended by the cast the film finally was released on 20 September 2018 in UAE and 21 September worldwide. The film had its TV world premiere on Zee Cinema on 16 February 2019.

== Soundtrack ==
Batti Gul Meter Chalu

Soundtrack album by Anu Malik, Rochak Kohli and Sachet–Parampara
- Released: 8 September 2018
- Recorded: 2018
- Genre: Feature film soundtrack
- Length: 20:14
- Language: Hindi
- Label: T-Series
External audio
- Official Audio Jukebox on YouTube

Anu Malik chronology
Paltan (2018)	Batti Gul Meter Chalu (2018)	Sui Dhaaga (2018)

Rochak Kohli chronology
Satyameva Jayate (2018)	Batti Gul Meter Chalu (2018)	Badhaai Ho (2018)

Sachet–Parampara chronology
Yamla Pagla Deewana: Phir Se (2018)	Batti Gul Meter Chalu (2018)	Kabir Singh (2019)

Singles from Batti Gul Meter Chalu
- 1. "Gold Tamba" Released: 18 August 2018; 2. "Dekhte Dekhte" Released: 25 August 2018; 3. "Hard Hard" Released: 28 August 2018; 4. "Har Har Gange" Released: 2 September 2018

The music of the film is composed by Anu Malik, Rochak Kohli, Sachet–Parampara while the lyrics were penned by Siddharth-Garima and Manoj Muntashir. The songs featured in the film are sung Rahat Fateh Ali Khan, Arijit Singh, Atif Aslam, Mika Singh, Nakash Aziz, Prakriti Kakar and Sachet Tandon. The album of the film was by released T-Series on 5 September 2018. The music supervision was assisted by Vatsal Chevli.

Track listing
No.	Title	Lyrics	Music	Singer(s)	Length
1.	"Gold Tamba"	Siddharth – Garima	Anu Malik	Nakash Aziz	5:02
2.	"Dekhte Dekhte"	Nusrat Fateh Ali Khan, Manoj Muntashir	Rochak Kohli, Nusrat Fateh Ali Khan	Atif Aslam	4:16
3.	"Dekhte Dekhte" (Version 2)	Nusrat Fateh Ali Khan, Manoj Muntashir	Rochak Kohli	Rahat Fateh Ali Khan	4:16
4.	"Hard Hard"	Siddharth – Garima	Sachet–Parampara	Mika Singh, Sachet Tandon, Prakriti Kakar	3:38
5.	"Har Har Gange"	Siddharth – Garima	Sachet – Parampara	Arijit Singh	3:02
Total length:					20:14

== Reception ==
Batti Gul Meter Chalu generally received negative reviews from critics. The film was lauded for its message, humor, performances and cinematography. The movie's running time and story execution faced criticism. On review aggregator site Rotten Tomatoes, 18% of 11 critics' reviews are positive, with an average rating of 4.8 out of 10.

DNA in its 3.5 stars review criticized the storyline but praised the performance of Shahid Kapoor. " Shahid is top-notch. The actor, who is in his prime, has matured into a fine talent and shows that he can shoulder a film on his own. Half a star in the film's rating is reserved only for Shahid."

Rachit Gupta from The Times of India in his 3 stars review questioned the screenplay saying, "BGMC loses power under the load of its heavy-duty screenplay." He, however praised Shahid & Shraddha's performance adding, "Shahid is able to blend a fine balance between the over-confident young man and the guy with a heart of gold. His monologue during the climax is superb. Shraddha Kapoor plays the peppy small town girl with panache."

Rajeev Masand gave positive response praising the performances of the cast, message and humor of the film. He awarded it 3 stars noting "This is one of those mainstreammovies that delivers its message coated with a thick layer of melodrama. And it works." Shubhra Gupta from The Indian Express rated it 2.5 stars out of 5 praising the cinematography, message and humor of the film. She noted saying "Batti Gul Meter Chalu is careless not to get too much in lecture-mode. The rest of it made me smile, and made me pause: how do you expect people to live without ‘bijli’ in today's world? It is, as SK says thunderously, a fundamental right."

Another critic Shrishti Negi of News 18 praised performances of the cast, writing and the heart of the film. While criticized the sexist 'jibles', massage and the film's overstretched second half. Devesh Sharma of Filmfare quoted "All-in-all, Batti Gul Meter Chalu is a film which has its heart in the right place. Better editing and a shortening of length by twenty minutes would have made the film more impactful."

While critic Jyoti Sharma Bawa from Hindustan Times criticized the execution of the film quoting "The film takes almost 1.5 hours to establish what the trailer explained in three minutes" giving it two and half from five stars.

== Legal issues ==
The shooting of the film got stalled in April 2018 due to the non-payment of dues by KriArj Entertainment. Later, in June 2018, producer Vashu Bhagnani claimed his rights over the film as the deal with KriArj Entertainment, which was denied by Bhushan Kumar, the current producer of the film.

The film's original and first writer Vipul K Rawal had filed a case against the Director and other writers for trying to deny him his rightful credit for the story, screenplay and dialogues of the film. Later, the matter was settled and it was decided that the credit for story, screenplay and dialogues will now be equally shared between Rawal along with Sidhartha Singh and Garima Wahal.
