= Cape of Good Films =

Indian film production company owned by Akshay Kumar

Cape Of Good Films
- Formerly: Hari Om Entertainment Co. (2008–2015)
- Type: Private
- Industry: Entertainment; Motion picture
- Founded: March 2008; 18 years ago
- Founder: Akshay Kumar
- Headquarters: Mumbai, Maharashtra, India
- Key people: Akshay Kumar; Twinkle Khanna
- Products: Films
- Services: Film production Film distribution
- Owner: Akshay Kumar
- Subsidiaries: Grazing Goat Pictures; Mrs Funnybones Movies; Fashion On My Own

Cape of Good Films, earlier known as Hari Om Entertainment Co. is an Indian film production and distribution company established by actor Akshay Kumar in 2008, based in Mumbai.

== History ==
'Hari Om' happens to be the name of Kumar's father. The company in association with Telefilm Canada produced a hockey based Indo-Canadian film Breakaway (2011).

It has produced National Award-winning films Rustom (2016), Pad Man (2018), and some of critically acclaimed and commercially successful films such as Singh Is Kinng (2008), Holiday: A Soldier Is Never Off Duty (2014), Baby (2015), Airlift (2016), Toilet: Ek Prem Katha (2017), Chumbak (2018), Mission Mangal (2019), Kesari (2019), Good Newwz (2019) and Sooryavanshi (2021).

== Films productions ==
Key
†	Denotes films that have not yet been released

=== Hindi films ===
List of Hindi films produced by Cape Of Good Films
Year	Title	Director	Distributed By
2008	Singh Is Kinng	Anees Bazmee	Viacom18 Studios; Reliance Entertainment
2009	De Dana Dan	Priyadarshan	Eros International
2010	Khatta Meetha	Priyadarshan	Eros International
2010	Tees Maar Khan	Farah Khan	UTV Motion Pictures
2010	Action Replayy	Vipul Shah	PVR Inox Pictures
2011	Patiala House	Nikkhil Advani	T-Series
2011	Thank You	Anees Bazmee	UTV Motion Pictures
2011	Breakaway	Robert Lieberman	Viacom18 Studios
2012	Joker	Shirish Kunder	UTV Motion Pictures
2012	Khiladi 786	Ashish R Mohan	Eros International
2013	Boss	Anthony D'Souza	Viacom18 Studios
2014	Holiday: A Soldier Is Never Off Duty	A. R. Murugadoss	Reliance Entertainment
2014	The Shaukeens	Abhishek Sharma	AA Films
2015	Baby	Neeraj Pandey	AA Films; T-Series
2016	Airlift	Raja Krishna Menon	Viacom18 Studios; T-Series
2016	Rustom	Tinu Suresh Desai	Zee Studios
2017	Naam Shabana	Shivam Nair	T-Series; Reliance Entertainment
2017	Toilet: Ek Prem Katha	Shree Narayan Singh	Viacom18 Studios
2018	Pad Man	R. Balki	Sony Pictures Motion Picture Group
2019	Mission Mangal	Jagan Shakti	Fox Star Studios
2019	Kesari	Anurag Singh	Zee Studios
2019	Good Newwz	Raj Mehta	Zee Studios
2020	Laxmii	Raghava Lawrence	Disney+ Hotstar; Fox Star Studios
2020	Durgamati	G. Ashok	Amazon Prime Video; T-Series
2021	Sooryavanshi	Rohit Shetty	Reliance Entertainment
2021	Atrangi Re	Aanand L. Rai	Disney+ Hotstar
2022	Raksha Bandhan	Aanand L. Rai	Zee Studios
2022	Ram Setu	Abhishek Sharma	Amazon Prime Video
2022	Ram Setu	Abhishek Sharma	Zee Studios
2023	Selfiee	Raj Mehta	Star Studios
2023	OMG 2	Amit Rai	Viacom18 Studios
2024	Sarfira	Sudha Kongara	Pen Studios
2025	Kesari Chapter 2	Karan Singh Tyagi	Dharma Productions
2026	Bhooth Bangla	Priyadarshan	Pen Marudhar
2026	Welcome to the Jungle	Ahmed Khan	Star Studio18
2027	Mauja Hi Mauja †	Anees Bazmee	PVR Inox Pictures
2027	Samuk †	Kanishk Varma	TBA

=== Marathi films ===
List of Marathi films produced by Cape Of Good Films
Year	Title	Director	Distributed By
2013	72 Miles	Rajiv Patil	Viacom18 Studios
2018	Chumbak	Sandeep Modi	AA Films
