= Manoj Muntashir =

Indian lyricist and poet (born 1976)

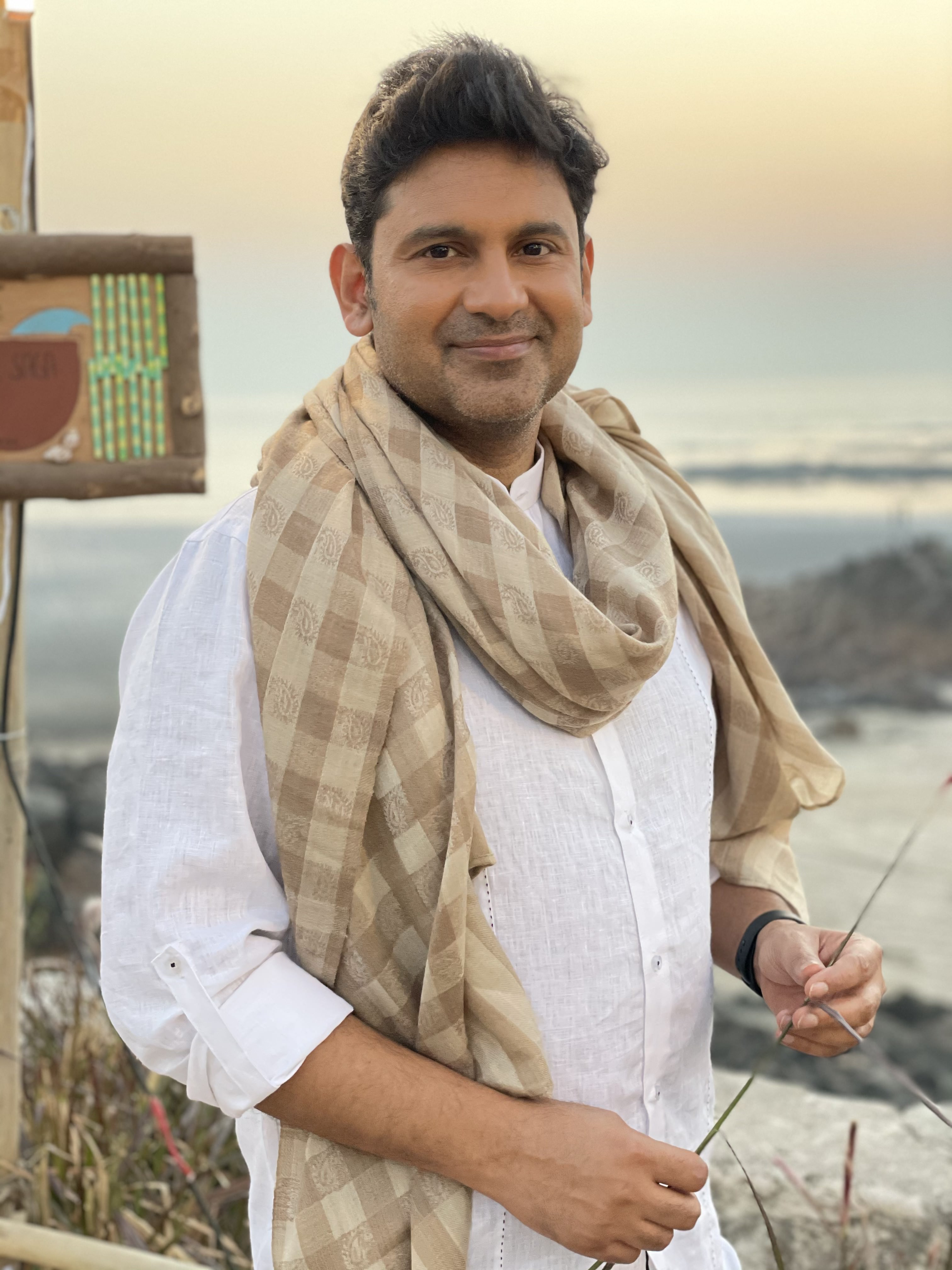
- Born: Manoj Shukla; 27 February 1976 (age 50); Gauriganj, Uttar Pradesh, India
- Education: Allahabad University
- Occupations: Lyricist; poet; screenwriter; author; television personality
- Parents: Shiv Pratap Shukla (father); Prema Shukla (mother)

YouTube information
- Channel: Manoj Muntashir Shukla
- Years active: 2015–present
- Genres: Poetry; Motivation
- Subscribers: 2.23 million
- Views: 275 million
- Last updated: 4 August 2026

Manoj Shukla (born 27 February 1976), better known by his stage name Manoj Muntashir Shukla, is an Indian lyricist, poet, dialogue writer, screenwriter & Co founder of T-Series Prarthana The Sound of Sanatan. He wrote several Hindi songs for films, including "Teri Mitti", "Galliyan", "Tere Sang Yaara", "Kaun Tujhe", "Dil Meri Na Sune", "Kaise Hua" "Maaye" and "Phir Bhi Tumko Chaahunga". He also wrote the script for 2023 Indian film "Adipurush", starring Prabhas and Saif Ali Khan.

== Early life ==
Shukla was born on 27 February 1976 into a Brahmin family in Gauriganj, Amethi, Uttar Pradesh, India, where he attended a HAL School Korwa. After graduating from Allahabad University in 1999, he moved to Mumbai to seek work, and subsequently entered the TV and film scene following an opportunity to write for Kaun Banega Crorepati.

== Career ==
Muntashir has written the lyrics of several Hindi film songs including "Galliyan" from Ek Villain, "Tere Sang Yaara" from Rustom, "Kaun Tujhe" from M.S Dhoni: The Untold Story and "Dil Meri Na Sune" from the film Genius.

He has voiced concerns with regards to acknowledgments to song and script writers. His lyrics to "Phir Bhi Tumko Chaahunga" (2017), a song which registered more than four million views through unofficial versions prior to its official release, were originally compiled for his wife in 2001. When he failed to receive acknowledgement for the song, he voiced that he didn't "know why certain people can't accept an age old fact that lyricists have an equal amount of contribution in making a song successful". Following a nomination for the 2020 Filmfare award for best lyrics for the song "Teri Mitti" from the 2019 film Kesari, he tweeted his disappointment when the award went to someone else. He has won National Film Awards for best lyrics in Saina.

He has written scripts for India's Got Talent and Indian Idol Junior. Muntashir wrote the Hindi dialogues for Baahubali 2, dubbing the words in Hindi to match the lip movements which were spoken in Telugu. Later, he was commissioned to do the same for the Hollywood film, Black Panther.

He published a book titled Meri Fitrat Hai Mastana.

Muntashir also wrote the dialogues for the film Adipurush (2023), which received widespread backlash. The dialogues of the film were criticised for being too flippant or unserious and containing modern-day slang and lingo in a setting from centuries ago. Muntashir defended his work, in an interview with Republic World, stating, "when our grandmothers narrated the tales of Ramayana, they used this language. The dialogue that you mentioned, priests and narrators used to say that in the same way I have written. I'm not the first one to write this dialogue, it's already there." Retrospectively, in 2026, he has called his work on the film, "the biggest mistake of his life". He said, "whatever happened around the film, I'm very ashamed of it, and I beg the forgiveness of this country for all that had happened."

== Awards and nominations ==
Year	Category	Song/nomination	Result
Indian Telly Awards
2014	Best Script	India's Got Talent	Won
IIFA Awards
2015	Best Lyrics	Galliyan – Ek Villain	Won
2018	Best Lyrics	Mere Rashk-e-Qamar –Baadshaho	Won
Star Guild Award
2015	Best Lyrics	Galliyan – Ek Villain	Won
Hungama Surfers Choice Award
2015	Best Lyrics	Galliyan – Ek Villain	Won
Radio Mirchi Music Awards
2015	Best Album	Ek Villain	Won
Arab Indo Bollywood Awards
2015	Best Lyrics	Galliyan – Ek Villain	Won
The Indian Icon Film Awards
2015	Best Lyrics	Galliyan – Ek Villain	Won
2016	Best Lyrics	Tere Sang Yaara – Rustom	Won
Uttar Pradesh Gaurav Samman
2016	Best Lyricist		Won
Yash Bharati Award
2016	State Honour (Uttar Pradesh)	Highest State Honour	Won
Mirchi Music Awards
2014	Lyricist of The Year	Galliyan from Ek Villain	Nominated
2014	Album of The Year	Ek Villain	Nominated
2014	Listeners' Choice Album of the Year	Ek Villain	Won
2016	Album of The Year	Kapoor & Sons	Nominated
2018	Re-Created Song of the Year	Sanu Ik Pal from Raid	Won
68th National Film Awards
2022	Best Lyricist	Saina	Won

== Filmography ==
Year	Film	Notes
2022	Vikram Vedha	co-written with Pushkar–Gayathri, B.A. Fida
2023	Adipurush	

== Discography ==
Year	Film	Number of songs	Record label	Composer
2026	Drishyam: The Conclusion	1	Sony Music India	Rochak Kohli
2026	The Vvaan: Force of the Forrest	1	Zee Music Company	Tanishk Bagchi
2026	Border 2	5	T-Series	Mithoon; Anu Malik; Vishal Mishra
2025	Sunny Sanskari Ki Tulsi Kumari	1	Sony Music India	Tanishk Bagchi
2025	Maa	1	T-Series	Rocky-Shiv
2025	Raid 2	1	T-Series	Rochak Kohli
2025	Sky Force	1	Saregama	Tanishk Bagchi
2025	Emergency	5	Zee Music Company	G. V. Prakash Kumar, Arko Pravo Mukherjee
2024	Sikandar Ka Muqaddar	1	Netflix	Payal Dev
2024	Lucky Baskhar	2	Aditya Music	G. V. Prakash Kumar
2024	Devara: Part 1	2	T-Series	Anirudh Ravichander
2024	Indian 2	2	Sony Music India	Anirudh Ravichander
2024	Sarfira	5	Times Music	G. V. Prakash Kumar, Suhit Abhyankar
2024	Auron Mein Kahan Dum Tha	7	Zee Music Company	M. M. Kreem
2024	Dedh Bigha Zameen	1	T-Series	Rochak Kohli
2024	Yodha	1	T-Series	Tanishk Bagchi
2024	Crakk	1	T-Series	Mithoon
2023	Animal	1	T-Series	JAM8, Pritam
2023	Bawaal	1	T-Series	Mithoon
2023	Adipurush	5	T-Series	Ajay-Atul, Sachet-Parampara
2023	Mission Majnu	2	Zee Music Company	Rochak Kohli
2022	Ram Setu	1	Zee Music Company	Ved Sharma
2022	Thank God	1	T-Series	Rochak Kohli
2022	Vikram Vedha	4	T-Series	Vishal-Shekhar, Sam C. S.
2022	Ek Villain Returns	2	T-Series	Ankit Tiwari
2022	Khuda Haafiz: Chapter 2	1	Zee Music Company	Vishal Mishra
2022	Operation Romeo	3	Saregama	M.M. Keeravani
2022	Radhe Shyam	2	T-Series	Mithoon
2021	Satyameva Jayate 2	4	T-Series	Rochak Kohli, Arko Pravo Mukherjee, Payal Dev
2021	Pyar Ek Tarfaa ft. Shreya Ghoshal, Amaal Mallik	1	Sony Music India	Amaal Mallik
2021	Kya Meri Sonam Gupta Bewafa Hai?	4	Saregama	Rahul Mishra, Payal Dev
2021	Bhuj: The Pride of India	3	T-Series	Arko, Lijo George - Dj Chetas, Tanishk Bagchi
2021	Lut Gaye	1	T-Series	Tanishk Bagchi
2021	Koi Jaane Na	3	T-Series	Rochak Kohli
2019	Hume Tumse Pyaar Kitna	1	T-Series	Jeet Gannguli
2019	Kesari	3	Zee Music	Arko
2019	Kabir Singh	1	T-Series	Vishal Mishra
2019	Notebook	1	T-Series	Vishal Mishra
2019	Why Cheat India	2	T-Series	Rochak Kohli
2018	Loveyatri	2	T-Series	Tanishk Bagchi
2018	Batti Gul Meter Chalu	2	T-Series	Rochak Kohli
2018	Genius	3	Tips Music	Himesh Reshammiya
2018	Humnava Mere (Single)	1	T-series	Rocky-Shiv
2018	Gal Sun (Single)	1	T-series	Akhil Sachdeva
2018	Oh Humsafar (Single)	1	T-series	Tony Kakkar
2018	Raid	2	T-series	Tanishk Bagchi
2018	Hate Story 4	3	T-series	Mithoon, Arko, Tanishk Bagchi
2018	Aiyaary	3	T-series	Rochak Kohli, Ankit Tiwari
2017	Naam Shabana	3	T-series	Rochak Kohli, Meet Bros
2017	Baadshaho	6	T-series	Tanishk Bagchi, Ankit Tiwari, Abhijit Vaghani
2017	Baahubali 2: The Conclusion	5	Lahari Music and T-Series (Telugu and Tamil) Zee Music Company (Hindi) Manorama Music (Malayalam)	M. M. Keeravani
2017	Half Girlfriend	4	Zee Music	Mithoon
2017	Kaabil	2	T-Series	Rajesh Roshan
2017	Ranchi Diaries	1	T-Series	Jeet Gannguli
2017	Noor	1	T-Series	Amaal Mallik
2016	Aap Se Mausiiquii ft. Himesh Reshammiya	25	T-Series and HR Musik Limited	Himesh Reshammiya
2016	Tumhe Dillagi by Rahat Fateh Ali Khan	1	T-Series	
2016	Wajah Tum Ho	1	T-Series	Mithoon
2016	Pyaar Manga Hai ft. Armaan Malik	1	T-Series	Abhijit Vaghani
2016	Do Chaar Din (Rahul Vaidya ft. Jeet Gannguli)	1	T-Series	
2016	Gajanan (Jeet Gannguli)	1	T-Series	
2016	Maiya Teri Jai Jaikaar ft. Arijit Singh	1	T-Series	
2016	M.S. Dhoni: The Untold Story	8	T-Series	Amaal Mallik, Rochak Kohli
2016	Akira	3	T-Series	Vishal–Shekhar
2016	Rustom	10	Zee Music	Ankit Tiwari, Jeet Gannguli, Arko Pravo Mukherjee, Raghav Sachar
2016	Junooniyat	2	T-Series	Ankit Tiwari, Jeet Gannguli
2016	Tum Bin II	8	T-Series	Ankit Tiwari
2016	Do Lafzon Ki Kahani	1	T-Series	Amaal Mallik
2016	Veerappan	1	T-Series	
2016	Waiting	1	Zee Muzic	Mikey Mccleary
2016	Rocky Handsome	1	T-Series	Sunny Bawra, Inder Bawra
2016	Kapoor & Sons	1	Sony Music India	Arko Pravo Mukherjee
2016	Jai Gangaajal	9	Zee Muzic	Salim–Sulaiman
2016	Sanam Re	3	T-Series	Amaal Mallik, Jeet Gannguli
2016	Mastizaade	1	T-Series	Amaal Mallik
2016	Wazir	1	T-Series	Ankit Tiwari
2015	Baahubali: The Beginning	8	Zee Muzic	M.M. Kreem
2015	Hate Story 3	1	T-Series	Boman
2015	Sonu Nigam: Aa Bhi Jaa Tu Kahin Se	1	T-Series	Jeet Gannguli
2015	Anmol Mallik: Lamhein	1	Vevo	
2015	Zindagi Aa Raha Hoon Main	1	T-Series	Amaal Mallik
2015	Phir Se: Dedicated to Team India	1		
2015	Baby	3	T-Series	M.M. Kreem
2015	Ishqedarriyaan	1	Zee Muzic	Jeet Gannguli
2015	Mr. X	1	Sony Music India	Ankit Tiwari
2015	Ek Paheli Leela	1	T-Series	Tony Kakkar
2014	Zed Plus	3	Zee Muzic	
2014	Rang Rasiya	5	Zee Muzic	
2014	PK	1	T-Series	Ankit Tiwari
2014	Ek Villain	2	T-Series	Ankit Tiwari
2011	Love U...Mr. Kalakaar!	6	Sony Music India	
2011	Yeh Faasley	2		
2011	Tere Mere Phere	3		
2010	Isi Life Mein	7	Sony Music India	
2010	The Great Indian Butterfly	1		
2010	Do Dooni Chaar	4		
2008	Woodstock Villa	1		
2007	Buddha Mar Gaya	1		
2005	U, Bomsi n Me	4	Universal Music India	
