= Sanjoy Chowdhury =

Indian film score composer

Sanjoy Chowdhury is an Indian film score composer. He debuted in 1998, by composing the background score of the Malayalam movie, Ennu Swantham Janakikutty. Shortly afterwards, filmmaker John Matthew Matthan roped him in to compose the background score of his Aamir Khan starrer, Sarfarosh. He has specialized as a background music composer and has composed the background score in many films. He is the son of Indian film composer, Salil Chowdhury.

== Filmography ==
=== Background Score Composer ===
Year	Film	Language	Notes
1990	Humari Shaadi	Hindi	Also song composer
1998	Ennu Swantham Janakikutty	Malayalam	
1999	Sarfarosh	Hindi	
1999	Chocolate	Hindi	
1999	Ingane Oru Nilapakshi	Malayalam	Also songs composer
2000	Tarkieb	Hindi	
2001	Khiladi 420	Hindi	
2001	Vadh	Hindi	
2002	Akhiyon Se Goli Maare	Hindi	
2002	Chalo Ishq Ladai	Hindi	
2002	Maseeha	Hindi	
2003	Ekti Nadir Naam	Bengali	
2004	Hum Kaun Hai?	Hindi	
2005	Sins	Hindi	
2005	Firefly	Hindi	Short Film
2006	Zinda	Hindi	
2006	Jai Santoshi Ma	Hindi	
2006	Golmaal: Fun Unlimited	Hindi	
2007	Kya Love Story Hai	Hindi	
2007	Jab We Met	Hindi	
2007	Ek Dhatak	Hindi	
2007	Dhan Dhana Dhan Goal	Hindi	
2008	C Kkompany	Hindi	
2008	Kismat Konnection	Hindi	
2008	Golmaal Returns	Hindi	
2008	A Wednesday!	Hindi	Nominated, Star Screen Award for Best Music Director
2008	EMI	Hindi	
2008	Sunday	Hindi	
2009	Chatur Singh 2 Star	Hindi	
2009	Aa Dekhen Zara	Hindi	
2009	Kisaan	Hindi	
2009	Poraan Joley	Bengali	
2009	Bole Ram	Hindi	
2009	The White Elephant	Hindi	
2009	Ek: The Power of One	Hindi	
2009	Suno Na.. Ek Nanhi Aawaz	Hindi	Also songs composer
2009	Missing Pieces	Hindi	Short Film
2009	Marega Sala	Hindi	
2009	Hum Phirr Milein Na Milein	Hindi	
2009	Vaada Raha	Hindi	
2009	Life Partner	Hindi	
2009	All the Best: Fun Begins	Hindi	
2010	Atithi Tum Kab Jaoge?	Hindi	
2010	Heartline	Hindi	
2010	Vroom	Hindi	
2010	Kabhi, Kahin	Punjabi	
2010	Milenge Milenge	Hindi	
2010	Lamhaa	Hindi	
2010	Hello Darling	Hindi	
2010	Golmaal 3	Hindi	
2010	Sheyi Din Dekha Hoyechilo	Bengali	
2010	Yeh Duriyan	Hindi	
2011	Yamla Pagla Deewana	Hindi	
2011	With Love, Delhi!	Hindi	
2011	Married to America	Hindi	
2011	Utt Pataang	Hindi	
2011	Cycle Kick	Hindi	
2011	Chaalis Chaurasi	Hindi	
2011	Bin Bulaye Baraati	Hindi	
2011	Dear Friend Hitler	Hindi	
2011	Yeh Dooriyan	Hindi	
2012	Staying Alive	Hindi	
2012	Chaar Din Ki Chandni	Hindi	
2012	Yeh jo Mohabbat Hain	Hindi	
2012	Holle Holle	Hindi	
2012	Society	Hindi	
2012	Chakradhaar	Hindi	
2012	Yamle Jatt Yamle	Punjabi	
2012	Kya Cool Hain Hum	Hindi	
2012	Pakao	Hindi	
2012	Jolly LLB	Hindi	
2012	Khiladi 786	Hindi	
2012	Special 26	Hindi	
2012	Main Rony Aur Jony	Hindi	
2012	Raasaleela	Malayalam	Also songs composer
2013	Porichoi	Bengali	
2013	Yang Malang	Punjabi	
2013	Badlapur Boys	Hindi	
2013	Club 60	Hindi	
2014	The Royal Bengal Tiger	Bengali	Also songs composer
2014	Total Siyapaa	Hindi	
2014	Freedom	Hindi	
2014	Expose	Hindi	
2014	Ami Shudhu Tomaar	Bengali	
2014	Jigariya	Hindi	
2015	Baby	Hindi	
2015	Dolly Ki Doli	Hindi	
2015	I Love Desi	Hindi	
2015	Mastizade	Hindi	
2015	Promise Dad	Hindi	
2015	Second Hand Husband	Hindi	
2015	All Is Well	Hindi	
2015	Bhaag Johnny	Hindi	
2015	Love Day	Hindi	
2015	Project Marathwada	Hindi	
2015	Roy	Hindi	
2015	Prem Ratan Dhan Payo	Hindi	
2015	M.S. Dhoni: The Untold Story	Hindi	
2016	Saat Uchakkey	Hindi	
2016	Ouch	Hindi	Short Film, 5th Delhi Shorts International Film Festival Award for Best Background Music 2016
2016	Fredrick	Hindi	
2016	ISIS	Hindi	
2016	Switch	Hindi	
2016	Tez Raftaar	Hindi	
2016	I Lao You	Hindi	Short Film
2016	Sanam Teri Kasam	Hindi	
2017	Naam Shabana	Hindi	
2017	Red Affairs	Hindi	
2017	Idak	Marathi	
2017	Veere di Wedding	Hindi	
2018	Aiyaary	Hindi	
2018	Ride By	Hindi	
2018	One Day	Hindi	
2018	Udgharsha	Kannada	
2018	Vodka Diaries	Hindi	
2018	Satyameva Jayate	Hindi	
2018	Paltan	Hindi	
2019	Marjaavaan	Hindi	
2019	Nado Khan	Punjabi	
2020	Virgin Bhanupriya	Hindi	Released on ZEE5
2021	Tribhanga	Hindi	
2021	It's Time to go	Marathi	
2021	Uttami	Malayalam	
2021	Satyameva Jayate 2	Hindi	
2021	Vilayat	Punjabi	
2022	Bandon main tha dum!	Hindi	Webseries
2022	Pop Kaun?	Hindi	Webseries
2022	Life Is Grey	Hindi	
2022	Bachcha Party	Hindi	
2022	Uththami	Malayalam	
2023	Kadhikan	Malayalam	Special Mention at the 2024 National Awards.
2023	Freelancer	Hindi	Webseries
2023	Vadnagar	Hindi	
2023	Ayodhya	Hindi	
2023	Chip	Hindi	
2023	Ouch 2	Hindi	Short Film
2024	U-shaped Lane	Hindi	
2024	Pyar ke doh naam	Hindi	
2024	Boomerang	Bengali	
2024	Punia ki Duniya	Hindi	
2024	Aap ki Pados Main	Hindi	
2024	Sikandar ka Muqaddar	Hindi	
2025	Khakee: The Bengal Chapter	Hindi	Released on Netflix

== Awards and nominations ==
Year	Title	Category	Film	Result	Ref(s)
2015	8th Mirchi Music Awards	Best Background Score	Baby	Nominated	
