= The Royal Bengal Tiger =

2014 Indian film by Rajesh Ganguly

- Theatrical release poster
- Directed by: Rajesh Ganguly
- Written by: Neeraj Pandey; Rajesh Ganguly
- Based on: Fight Club (novel) by: Chuck Palahniuk; Fight Club (film); by Jim Uhls
- Produced by: Neeraj Pandey; Shital Bhatia; Jeet
- Starring: Abir Chatterjee; Jeet; Priyanka Sarkar; Shraddha Das
- Cinematography: Pratap Rout
- Edited by: Shree Narayan Singh
- Music by: Sanjoy Chowdhury
- Production companies: Friday Filmworks; Grassroot Entertainment Pvt. Ltd
- Distributed by: Viacom 18 Motion Pictures; Grassroot Entertainment Pvt. Ltd
- Release date: 31 January 2014
- Running time: 110 minutes
- Country: India
- Language: Bengali

The Royal Bengal Tiger (/ðə ˈrɔɪəl ˈbɛŋɡəl ˈtaɪɡər/) is a 2014 Indian Bengali-language surrealist psychological thriller film co-written and directed by Rajesh Ganguly, from a story by Neeraj Pandey. Produced by Pandey, Shital Bhatia, and Jeet under the respective banners of Friday Filmworks, Viacom 18 Motion Pictures and Grassroot Entertainment, the film is an adaptation of Chuck Palahniuk's 1996 novel Fight Club. It revolves around a timid man who turns aggressive and stands up to his enemies after meeting his childhood friend.

Also drawing influences from Bhagavata Puran, the film stars Abir Chatterjee, Priyanka Sarkar and Shraddha Das in lead roles, with Jeet himself in an extended special appearance. The film received positive reviews from critics and turned out to be commercially successful. The film has only one song, sung by Timir Biswas. The film premiered in Kolkata on 1 February 2014.

== Synopsis ==
Abhi is a meek Bengali family man who does not know how to fight. He lives in Kolkata with his wife Apu and his son. He has a tenant Mr. Pakrashi who has not paid rent for six months. He simply walks away. In his office Abhi is a hardworker. His colleague Deepankar is jealous of him and plans his downfall, but his other colleague Nandini is a friend and sympathiser. During Abhi's birthday morning he asked his tenant to pay up, but gets slapped in the middle of the road by him.

Abhi goes to his office only to learn that all his files have been messed up by someone and one important file of payment is missing. He works the whole night on them only to be sabotaged by Deepankar again. That night while Abhi was returning with Nandini she gets molested by some goons at the metro station. She cries to Abhi for help, but Abhi cannot fight. Nandini boards the metro crying. leaving Abhi at the station.

Abhi is ashamed. He meets his friend Anjan and narrates the story and about his helplessness. Anjan takes him to a coffee house and encourages him, causing him to shrug off his fear. They both visit his office to search for the missing file. Finding nothing, they ransack the office and run away.

While returning home he learns that Pakrashi is boozing with friends. Angrily he enters the house and beats Pakrashi black and blue and forces him to pay up. The next day Nandini rejects Abhi's proposal for boarding a metro and taunts him. Abhi drops his office bag accidentally in the road. Abhi tells Anjan and they both run towards the metro station and Abhi starts beating up the molesters.

The next day he meets Anjan again and Anjan gives him his contact number. At his office Abhi is shocked when he learns that Deepankar has been promoted. Unable to bear this Abhi suspects that he has been tricked. He hunts Deepankar down that night and beats him up. His rival confesses that he had stolen the payment file and hid it in his home. Anjan asks Abhi that since Deepankar has made his file disappear, he should in turn make Deepankar disappear. Abhi ties Deepankar up and throws him on the highway where he is killed. Meanwhile, Apu and her psychiatrist father, travel to the police station where they recover the bag and inform them he is still missing, Apu's father discloses that Abhi is a psychiatric patient suffering from schizophrenia. While the discussion continues, the police receive the news of Abhi sitting with Deepankar's corpse. The police bring him in where it is revealed that the character, Anjan doesn't exist. He is just an imagination of Abhi.

== Cast ==
- Abir Chatterjee as Abhiroop a.k.a. Abhi
- Jeet as Anjan Sen(Extended cameo appearance)
- Priyanka Sarkar as Aparna a.k.a. Apu
- Shraddha Das as Nandini Sanyal
- Kharaj Mukherjee as Mr.Pakrashi, Abhi's tenant
- Rajesh Sharma as GC Bagchi
- Shantilal Mukherjee as Deepankar
- Barun Chanda as Dr. Bagchi, a psychiatrist, Aparna's father
- Tanima Sen as unnamed woman in the metro
- Chandan Sen as police officer

== Critical response ==
The film have got mostly positive response from critics and audience alike. It was a box office hit.
