= Rustom (film) =

2016 Indian film by Tinu Suresh Desai

- Theatrical release poster
- Directed by: Tinu Suresh Desai
- Written by: Vipul K Rawal
- Based on: K. M. Nanavati vs. State of Maharashtra
- Produced by: Aruna Bhatia; Nitin Keni; Akash Chawla; Virender Arora; Ishwar Kapoor; Shital Bhatia; Deepanshu Mishra; Prerna Arora; Arjun N. Kapoor
- Starring: Akshay Kumar; Ileana D'Cruz
- Narrated by: Manoj Bajpayee
- Cinematography: Santosh Thundiyil
- Edited by: Shree Narayan Singh
- Music by: Songs: Jeet Gannguli; Arko; Raghav Sachar; Ankit Tiwari; Background Score: Surinder Sodhi
- Production companies: Zee Studios; KriArj Entertainment; Cape of Good Films; Plan C Studios
- Distributed by: Panorama Studios (India); Zee Studios Int’l (Overseas)
- Release date: 12 August 2016
- Country: India
- Language: Hindi
- Budget: ₹50.28 crore
- Box office: est. ₹218.12 crore

Rustom is a 2016 Indian Hindi-language crime thriller film directed by Tinu Suresh Desai and written by Vipul K. Rawal. The film is jointly produced by Cape of Good Films, Zee Studios, KriArj Entertainment, Plan C Studios. It stars Akshay Kumar as Rustom Pavri - a naval officer, Ileana D'Cruz, Arjan Bajwa and Esha Gupta in lead roles. The film is loosely based on the K. M. Nanavati v. State of Maharashtra court case, and narrates the story of naval officer Rustom, who shares a happy relationship with his wife Cynthia. Soon, he discovers her affair with Vikram, a close friend, and is accused of murdering him.

Made on a budget of ₹50 crore (US$5.3 million), the film began principal photography in February 2016, and was theatrically released on 12 August 2016 in India. Rustom received mixed reviews from critics. It became a box office success grossing over ₹210 crore (US$22 million) worldwide at the box office, was the fourth highest-grossing Hindi film of 2016 and fifth highest grossing Indian film of 2016.

At the 64th National Film Awards, Kumar received the National Film Award for Best Actor for his portrayal of the titular character.

== Plot ==
Indian Navy officer Commander Rustom Pavri is happily married to Cynthia Pavri in 1959, 12 years after the independence from the British colonial government in Bombay. One night their romance leads to sex. Their marriage hits rockbottom when he discovers that she is having an affair with his friend Vikram Makhija. After returning early from his deployment, Rustom discovers Vikram's love letters in Cynthia's cupboard. While trying to find her, Rustom sees them together. He returns home and waits for Cynthia to return and then confronts her with the love letters, but walks away before Cynthia can explain. Rustom then gets himself a pistol from the naval ship's armory and makes a trunk call to K. G. Bakshi at Defence Secretariat, New Delhi. Afterwards, he searches for Vikram, first in his office Imperial Motors and then at his home. After Rustom enters Vikram's bedroom, the servant hears three gunshots and rushes to the room, to discover Vikram dead with three bullets on his chest and Rustom walking away with the pistol in his hand. He immediately surrenders to the Bombay police and Senior Inspector Vincent Lobo starts the investigation.

Vikram's sister Preeti Makhija meets the public prosecutor, Lakshman Khangani to get Rustom the toughest punishment possible. Rustom refuses anybody's help and decides to fight the case on his own and prefers police custody. Rustom's senior naval officer, Rear Admiral Prashant Kamath, sends two goons to Rustom's house to search for a set of critical documents, but they fail to find anything. Scared, Cynthia rushes to jail to inform Rustom, who finally meets and listens to Cynthia's story, about how she was lonely and upset when Rustom went away to London for many months. With the connivance of Preeti, Vikram took advantage of Cynthia's loneliness and she fell for him. However, on the day of Vikram's murder, Cynthia had already broken-up with him for the sake of her marriage. She was slapped by Vikram after she broke up with him and got injured and walked out of Vikram's house.

On Rustom's instructions, Cynthia blackmails Kamath for ₹5 crore in exchange for the vital documents he needed. In the court hearing, Rustom unexpectedly pleads not guilty in front of the Judge Patel, which leads to a 9-member jury trial. At the culmination of the trial, Rustom is found not guilty by the jury since he shot Vikram in self-defence. Meanwhile, it is found that Lobo was in New Delhi and he had met Bakshi to obtain the recording of the trunk call that Rustom had made, which wasn't mentioned about in the entire hearing. When back in Bombay, the trunk call is played, convincing almost everyone that Rustom is guilty, and the court proceedings end for the jury to decide on their opinion.

On the eve of judgement day, Rustom tells Lobo the truth — he was posted in London in 1958 for several months, inspecting an aircraft carrier that the Navy wants to purchase. Rustom found that the carrier's hull was corroded, and it would have to be repaired and modified before the carrier could be transferred to India. Vikram was lobbying for the aircraft carrier to be bought by India, and he, along with Kamath, attempted to bribe him in order to convince him to say that the carrier is seaworthy. When Rustom attempted to notify Bakshi in London, Bakshi also attempted to bribe him and get the carrier to India. Vikram attempted to persuade him and Rustom then slapped him in disgust. Believing him to have shown the power of his uniform, Vikram had seduced Cynthia to show Rustom his power of money and take revenge on him, but never really liked her. Rustom, angry at Vikram's actions, took a pistol from the naval ship's armory, then called Bakshi, telling him he wasn't going to spare Vikram, and that he had papers exposing the carrier's unworthiness for the Navy. Rustom then went to Vikram's house and fatally shot him. Bakshi then sent Kamath to get the documents which Rustom said he had and on Lobo asking for the recording of the trunk call, gave him half of the recording to hide his corruption. Rustom puts it thus that he did not reveal anything about the aircraft carrier so that the Navy would not have to be tainted with a corrupt image. Rustom then reveals that he never actually had any documents relating to the proof that the carrier was damaged.

The next day, the jury's decision of Rustom being not guilty is declared by the judge teary-eyed. Rustom and Cynthia walk out of the court with their heads held high. The film ends with Rustom and Cynthia on a vacation after getting all of the commission that Rustom earned from Bakshi, who later committed suicide in fear of facing trials and treason (involved in the deal at high level) for cutting the tape half. Rustom learned the purchase result after reading in the local newspaper about the new carrier arriving in India (in reference to INS Vikrant) in a robust condition, just as he had wished.

== Cast ==
- Akshay Kumar as Commander Rustom "Rusi" Pavri (based on real-life ex-naval officer K. M. Nanavati)
- Ileana D'Cruz as Cynthia Pavri, Rustom's wife (based on Sylvia Nanavati)
- Arjan Bajwa as Vikram Makhija, Rustom's close friend and Cynthia's paramour (based on Prem B. Ahuja)
- Esha Gupta as Preeti Makhija, Vikram's sister (based on Mamie Ahuja)
- Pavan Malhotra as Senior Inspector Vincent Lobo (based on DCP John Lobo)
- Usha Nadkarni as Jamnabai, Rustom's house maid servant
- Sachin Khedekar as Public Prosecutor Lakshman Khangani, Preeti's lawyer (based on Ram Jethmalani)
- Kumud Mishra as Erich Billimoria, the editor and publisher of Truth (based on Russi Karanjia who published Blitz)
- Anang Desai as Judge Patel
- Parmeet Sethi as Rear Admiral Prashant Kamath, Flag Officer Commanding Western Fleet (FOCWF)
- Indraneel Bhattacharya as Captain C. P. Cherian
- Kanwaljit Singh as Defence Secretary K. G. Bakshi
- Brijendra Kala as Head-Constable Tukaram Yadav
- Gireesh Sahedev as Lt. Commander Kamal Pujari
- Abhay Kulkarni as Sub-Inspector Umakant Patil
- Varun Verma as Lieutenant Daksh Bisht
- Sammanika Singh as Rosie Cost, the receptionist of Imperial Motors
- Deepak Gheewala as Bhanabhai Warli, Vikram's house help
- Ishtiyak Khan as Chandu
- Naman Jain as Dagdu
- Subhashis Chakraborty as Ranjeet Das, Rustom's witness
- Vipul K. Rawal as Captain
- Suresh Sippy as Chief of Ship
- Rajesh S. Khatri as Damodar
- Samir Shah as Ramesh Shirke
- Haresh Khatri as Dr. Asher, Khangani's witness
- Homi Wadia as Advocate Sohrab Khandwala, Khangani's fellow lawyer
- Mohit Satyanand as Jamshedji Jeejabhoy
- Ranjan Raj as Ticket Blackmailer
- Rama Kant Sharma as East Indian Jury
- Manoj Bajpayee as Narrator

== Production ==
The project was filmed on location in Kent in April 2016 for the romantic montage where Rustom (Akshay Kumar) and Cynthia (Ileana D'Cruz) visit England including The Chequers Inn pub in Aylesford, Canterbury, Maidstone, Leeds Castle, Dover seafront and South Foreland Lighthouse. The Historic Dockyard Chatham also features for the naval port and ship scenes.

Kumar and Twinkle Khanna were sent legal notices for auctioning the costume worn by Kumar to portray the role of a naval officer. They were accused of "playing with the sentiments" of the armed forces.

== Box office ==
=== India ===
The film was released alongside Mohenjo Daro on 2017 screens across India on 12 August 2016. Rustom collected approximately ₹14.11 crore on its opening day. The film collected ₹50 crore in its opening weekend and ₹90.9 crore in its first week in India.

=== International ===
The film also performed well internationally, grossing approximately $3 million in its opening weekend.

== Critical reception ==
On the review aggregator website Rotten Tomatoes, 45% of 11 critics' reviews are positive, with an average rating of 5.1/10.

== Soundtrack ==
=== Score ===
The film score was composed by Surinder Sodhi.

=== Songs ===
Rustom

Soundtrack album by Arko, Raghav Sachar, Ankit Tiwari and Jeet Gannguli
- Released: 14 July 2016
- Recorded: 2015–2016
- Genre: Feature film soundtrack
- Length: 40:56
- Language: Hindi
- Label: Zee Music Company

The songs featured in Rustom were composed by Arko, Raghav Sachar, Ankit Tiwari, and Jeet Gannguli, with lyrics written by Manoj Muntashir.

The first song from the film's soundtrack album, "Tere Sang Yaara", sung by Atif Aslam and composed by Arko was released on 6 July 2016. The second track of the film, titled "Rustom Vahi" was released on 13 July 2016. All lyrics are penned by Manoj Muntashir. The full music album was released on 14 July 2016.

On 29 October 2019, a new version of the song "Dhal Jaun Main" was released on the Zee Music Company's official YouTube Channel with Arijit Singh's vocals.

All lyrics are written by Manoj Muntashir.

Track listing
| No. | Title | Music | Singer(s) | Length |
|---|---|---|---|---|
| 1. | "Tere Sang Yaara" | Arko | Atif Aslam | 4:51 |
| 2. | "Rustom Vahi" | Raghav Sachar | Sukriti Kakar | 3:20 |
| 3. | "Tay Hai" | Ankit Tiwari | Ankit Tiwari | 3:48 |
| 4. | "Dekha Hazaro Dafaa" | Jeet Gannguli | Arijit Singh, Palak Muchhal | 3:30 |
| 5. | "Dhal Jaun Main" | Jeet Gannguli | Jubin Nautiyal, Akanksha Sharma | 4:53 |
| 6. | "Jab Tum Hote Ho" | Ankit Tiwari | Shreya Ghoshal | 4:18 |
| 7. | "Rustom Vahi Theme" | Raghav Sachar | | 1:23 |
| 8. | "Rustom Vahi – Marathi" | Raghav Sachar | Jasraj Joshi | 3:07 |
| 9. | "Rustom Vahi – Male" | Raghav Sachar | Jasraj Joshi | 3:10 |
| 10. | "Tere Bin Yaara (Reprise)" | Arko | Arko | 3:46 |

== Awards and nominations ==
| Year | Ceremony | Category | Recipient(s) and nominee(s) | Result |
|---|---|---|---|---|
| 2017 | Screen Awards | Best Actor | Akshay Kumar | Nominated |
| 2017 | Screen Awards | Best Promising Director | Tinu Suresh Desai | Won |
| 2017 | Stardust Awards | Best Actor in a Negative Role | Arjan Bajwa | Nominated |
| 2017 | Stardust Awards | Best Film of the Year | Neeraj Pandey. | Nominated |
| 2017 | Stardust Awards | Best Actor of the Year – Male | Akshay Kumar | Nominated |
| 2017 | Stardust Awards | Best Story | Vipul K. Rawal | Nominated |
| 2017 | Stardust Awards | Best Costume Design | Ameira Punvani | Nominated |
| 2017 | Zee Cine Awards | Best Film | Neeraj Pandey | Nominated |
| 2017 | 64th National Film Awards | Best Actor | Akshay Kumar | Won |
| 2017 | 62nd Filmfare Awards | Best Male Playback Singer | Atif Aslam for Tere Sang Yaara | Nominated |
| 2017 | 62nd Filmfare Awards | Best Male Playback Singer | Atif Aslam for Tere Sang Yaara | Nominated |
| 2017 | Lux Golden Rose Awards | Best Supporting Actress | Esha Gupta | Nominated |
| 2017 | 9th Mirchi Music Awards | Upcoming Male Vocalist of The Year | Arko Pravo Mukherjee – "Tere sang Yaara" | Nominated |
| 2017 | 9th Mirchi Music Awards | Upcoming Female Vocalist of The Year | Aakanksha Sharma – "Dhal Jaun Main" | Nominated |
| 2018 | Pyongyang International Film Festival | Informative and Special Screening | – | Won |

== See also ==
- Yeh Rastey Hain Pyar Ke (1963)
