= Auron Mein Kahan Dum Tha =

2024 film directed by Neeraj Pandey

- Theatrical release poster
- Directed by: Neeraj Pandey
- Written by: Neeraj Pandey
- Produced by: Shital Bhatia; Narendra Hirawat; Shreyans Hirawat
- Starring: Ajay Devgn; Tabu; Jimmy Sheirgill; Shantanu Maheshwari; Saiee Manjrekar
- Cinematography: Sudheer Palsane
- Edited by: Praveen Kathikuloth
- Music by: M. M. Kreem
- Production companies: Friday Filmworks; NH Studioz
- Distributed by: NH Studioz
- Release date: 2 August 2024
- Running time: 144 minutes
- Country: India
- Language: Hindi
- Budget: ₹100 crore
- Box office: est. ₹12.91 crore

Auron Mein Kahan Dum Tha is a 2024 Indian Hindi-language romantic thriller film written and directed by Neeraj Pandey. The film stars Ajay Devgn and Tabu in their tenth film together alongside Jimmy Sheirgill, Shantanu Maheshwari and Saiee Manjrekar.

The project between Pandey and Devgn was announced in October 2022. Principal photography commenced in February 2023 and wrapped in December 2023. The film score and soundtrack album was composed by M. M. Keeravani.

Auron Mein Kahan Dum Tha was initially scheduled to be released on 5 July 2024, but later delayed on request of film exhibitors and film distributors. It was eventually released theatrically on 2 August 2024 to mixed reviews from critics and became a box-office bomb, grossing only ₹12 crore in its theatrical run.

== Plot ==
The film story follows a couple whose love story spans 23 years from 2000 to 2023, delving into the emotional depth and evolving dynamics of their relationship over two decades. Krishna gets involved in multiple murders and is sentenced to life imprisonment. This leads to Vasudha getting separated from him and marrying Abhijeet. After 22 years when Krishna is released from prison after getting pardon, he yearns to meet Vasudha. It culminates in one final meeting between Krishna and Vasudha.

== Cast ==
- Ajay Devgn as Krishna
  - Shantanu Maheshwari as young Krishna
- Tabu as Vasudha
  - Saiee Manjrekar as young Vasudha
- Jimmy Sheirgill as Abhijeet, Vasudha's husband
- Sayaji Shinde as Mahesh Desai
- Jay Upadhyay as Jignesh
  - Kushal Shah as young Jignesh
- Hardik Soni as Pakya
- Shahrukh Sadri as Jamshed
- Jiten Lalwani as Superintendent Solanki
- Meherzan Mazda as Raghuvanshi
- Pratibha Borde as Kaki
- Velji Nakar as Sundar
- Vaibhav Sharma as Kona
- Saurabh Thakare as Babu
- Dhan Singh Rajput as Vasudha's father
- Usha Saksena as Vasudha's mother
- Nandini Karmarkar as Vasudha's sister

== Production ==
=== Filming ===
Principal photography commenced in February 2023. First schedule was completed in March 2023 and April 2023. Production was wrapped in December 2023. The film has been shot extensively in Mumbai, Delhi and Lucknow.

== Soundtrack ==
Auron Mein Kahan Dum Tha

Soundtrack album by M. M. Keeravani
- Released: 12 August 2024
- Genre: Feature film soundtrack
- Length: 25:16
- Language: Hindi
- Label: Zee Music Company

Official audio
- Auron Mein Kahan Dum Tha - Full Album on YouTube

The soundtrack and background score of the film has been composed by M. M. Kreem, while the lyrics were written by Manoj Muntashir. The first single titled "Tuu" was released on 18 June 2024.

Track listing
No.	Title	Singer(s)	Length
1.	"Auron Mein Kahan Dum Tha – Title Track"	Ajay Devgn	2:24
2.	"Tuu"	Sukhwinder Singh, Javed Ali	4:11
3.	"Ae Dil Zara"	Amala Chebolu, Rishabh Chaturvedi	4:06
4.	"Kisi Roz"	Maithili Thakur	5:11
5.	"Jahan Se Chale The"	Sunidhi Chauhan, Jubin Nautiyal	2:02
6.	"Kisi Roz" (Male Version)	M. M. Keeravani	5:12
7.	"Dobara Humein Kya"	Jubin Nautiyal, Sunidhi Chauhan	2:06
Total length:			25:16

== Release ==
=== Theatrical ===
The film was scheduled to release on 26 April 2024 and then 5 July 2024, but was postponed to 2 August 2024.

=== Home media ===
The film was premiered on Amazon Prime Video from 27 September 2024.

== Box office ==
Box office collections were most disappointing. It was ₹1.85 crore on the opening day [August 2]. Last three days' collections were ₹2.75 crore, ₹1.00 crore and ₹0.95 crore respectively. Thus total collection for first 5 days was ₹12.00 crore, as against the film's total cost of around ₹160 crore. The film is being biggest disaster of 2024 with loss of 88-to-148 crore after Ajay Devgn's film Maidaan.

== Reception ==
Auron Mein Kahan Dum Tha was poorly received by critics. On the review aggregator website Rotten Tomatoes, 0% of 6 critics' reviews are positive, with an average rating of 5.5/10. The film received mixed reviews from audiences.

Dhaval Roy of The Times Of India rated the film 3 stars out of 5 and wrote "Auron Mein Kahan Dum Tha is an attempt at a mature love story that falters in execution, with its slow pace and predictable plot hindering its impact. Watch this one if you appreciate deliberate pacing and emotionally charged narratives." Titas Chowdhury of New18 rated the film 3 stars out of 5 and wrote "Auron Mein Kahan Dum Tha may be a little all over the place and even lack that sparkling drive, but the quartet prevents the quivering script from completely falling apart." Tanmayi Savadi of Times Now rated the film 2.5 stars out of 5 and wrote "Auron Mein Kahan Dum Tha's engaging pre-interval is marred by an exhausting second half. A few moments promise a spike in the tale but they're lost opportunities. Lacking conviction, the film's story is the biggest ‘dushman’." Deepa Gahlot of Rediff.com rated 2.5/5 stars and notes "Right from the lofty title, Auron Mein Kahan Dum Tha keeps aiming to be an epic, and keeps falling short." A critic for Bollywood Hungama rated the film 2 stars out of 5 and wrote "Auron Mein Kahan Dum Tha is a slow and boring film that suffers due to lack of meat in the story and a predictable climax."

Lachmi Deb Roy of Firstpost rated the film 2 stars out of 5 and wrote "It looked like Neeraj Pandey totally failed in pulling off a romantic suspense thriller which he probably tried making. The movie lacked the steam to keep the audience engaged or glued to the screen. The story lacks the required zing which is very important for today's audiences who have been exposed to not only Indian cinema, but world cinema too." Shubhra Gupta of The Indian Express rated the film 2 stars out of 5 and wrote "The joy of watching seasoned warhorses Ajay Devgn and Tabu in a star-crossed romance is undercut by the movie's mothballed treatment: instead of being fresh, it feels dated, a vehicle unworthy of its star pair. Auron Mein Kahan Dum Tha is a clunky title for a film which should have been anything but." Arushi Jain of India Today rated the film 1.5 stars out of 5 and wrote "It is boring. It is slow. It's not romantic. It's not funny. It's not sad. What is it? A 144-minute snoozefest. It does get weaker as it goes along, leading to some very predictable plot developments."
