= Sikandar Ka Muqaddar =

2024 film by Neeraj Pandey

- Official release poster
- Directed by: Neeraj Pandey
- Screenplay by: Neeraj Pandey; Vipul K. Rawal
- Story by: Neeraj Pandey
- Produced by: Shital Bhatia
- Starring: Jimmy Shergill; Avinash Tiwary; Tamannaah Bhatia; Rajeev Mehta; Divya Dutta
- Cinematography: Arvind Singh
- Edited by: Praveen Kathikuloth
- Music by: Payal Dev
- Production company: Friday Storytellers
- Distributed by: Netflix
- Release date: 29 November 2024
- Running time: 143 minutes
- Country: India
- Language: Hindi

Sikandar Ka Muqaddar (transl. The Fate of Sikandar) is a 2024 Indian Hindi-language heist thriller film directed by Neeraj Pandey, starring Jimmy Sheirgill, Avinash Tiwary, Tamannaah Bhatia, Rajeev Mehta and Divya Dutta. The film is produced by Shital Bhatia under the banner of Friday Storytellers. It was released on Netflix on 29 November 2024 to mixed reviews from critics.

== Plot ==
At a diamond expo in Mumbai with heavy police presence, five red solitaires worth ₹50–60 crore go missing during the chaos of a heist gone awry. Investigation Officer Jaswinder Singh suspects Mangesh Desai, Kamini Singh (both employees of a diamond shop), and Sikandar Sharma (an IT technician) on instinct but finds no evidence that can prove their guilt. In remand custody, the police try to beat a confession out of Sikandar but he maintains his innocence. He makes Jaswinder promise him that once Sikandar is proven innocent, Jaswinder will look him in the eye and apologise. At a preliminary hearing, all three accused are granted bail.

Jaswinder sets about ruining Sikandar's life, causing him to lose his income and apartment and become ostracised in society. Sikandar grows close to Kamini, a single mother, marries her, and forms a family with Kamini, her infant son, and his younger sister. When an opportunity arises in Agra, Kamini pawns off a minor diamond she had stolen at the expo to generate funds, but Jaswinder catches her in the act. He coerces her to spy on Sikandar, but she stops reporting back to him once the family reach Agra.

Eventually, all three accused are acquitted due to lack of evidence and Jaswinder is reprimanded for leading an unprofessional investigation. Enraged, he tracks Sikandar to Agra and once again causes him to lose his job and his house, and has him mugged and beaten by local goons. Sikandar contemplates suicide, but senses Jaswinder's hand behind his misfortunes and resolves to fight him. The missing solitaires are not recovered and the unresolved case haunts both Jaswinder and Sikandar.

Fifteen years later, Sikandar is a successful project manager in Abu Dhabi due to his grit, determination, and support from Kamini. Meanwhile, Jaswinder has spiraled into obsession and alcoholism, and is kicked out of the police force on the same day that his divorce is finalised. Losing his purpose in life, he calls Sikandar to apologise, but Sikandar reminds him of the old promise and insists that Jaswinder apologise to him in person. In Mumbai, Jaswinder sets up a face-to-face meeting in which he admits that his instinct was wrong and details how he manipulated events to heap misery upon Sikandar and his family in an attempt to make him desperate enough to cash in on the solitaires Jaswinder believed he had stolen. Sikandar goes to his Mumbai home and breaks off the relationship with Kamini, but promises to make financial arrangements for her and the family.

Sikandar then travels to a rural conservatory operated by childhood friend Priya, where he retrieves a bonsai pot containing the hidden solitaires. But Jaswinder, who had faked the apology after realising that Sikandar would only seek the solitaires after he was convinced that Jaswinder has given up on the case, tracks him down and holds him at gunpoint at a remote location. Now cornered, Sikandar explains how he pulled off the robbery. He had discovered the plan to carry out a large-scale heist at the diamond expo by chance, and hatched his own plan. He anonymously tipped off the police to the heist, and took advantage of his knowledge of the security protocols to steal the solitaires in the chaos. Due to Sikandar's tip, the heist was stopped and the conspirators gunned down by police. Priya, who was a nurse on duty at a nearby hospital, arrived to retrieve the bodies of the conspirators, and Sikandar passed off the stolen solitaires to her before he could be strip searched, and Priya had kept them hidden at her conservatory for years.

The film ends with Sikandar vowing to make Jaswinder an offer. But the viewers are left to script their own ending of the story, since some viewers may prefer an ending in which he does take the offer, while others may choose the one where Jaswinder smilingly rejects the offer.

== Cast ==
Adapted from closing credits:

- Jimmy Sheirgill as IO Jaswinder Singh
- Avinash Tiwary as Sikandar Sharma
- Tamannaah Bhatia as Kamini Singh
- Rajeev Mehta as Mangesh Desai
- Divya Dutta as Kaushalya Singh
- Ridhima Pandit as Priya Sawant
- Zoya Afroz as Tabbasum Khan
- Praful Joshi as Inspector Santosh Kamble
- Santanu Ghatak as Anoop Das
- Rashmi Shukla as Judge Sushila
- Anil Pandey as Judge
- Ashrut Jain as Manish Shukla, Sikandar's friend
- K. S. Krishnan as Anna
- Shivraj Walwekar as ACP Shrikant Wagh
- Arpit Mishra as Mama ji
- Bharat Jha as Tiwari ji, landlord
- Ashutosh Kushwaha as waiter
- Aparna Upadhyay as Sikandar's mother
- Abhishek Mishra as a man in tenement
- Amrita Kumari as lady constable
- Allinson Aranha as informer
- Ravi Kothari

== Production ==
In February 2024, Netflix announced another collaboration with Neeraj Pandey and revealed the film's title through a motion poster. The star cast was later revealed in a behind-the-scenes video released by Netflix in October 2024.

== Music ==
Track listing
No.	Title	Lyrics	Music	Singer(s)	Length
1.	"Thehre Rahen"	Manoj Muntashir	Payal Dev	Jubin Nautiyal	3:51

== Reception ==
Sikandar Ka Muqaddar received mixed reviews from critics. On the review aggregator website Rotten Tomatoes, 70% of 10 critics' reviews are positive, with an average rating of 5.8/10.

Lachmi Deb Roy of Firstpost awarded the film three and a half out of five stars, remarking, "Jimmy Shergill, Tamannaah Bhatia, Avinash Tiwary starrer heist thriller is unique to the core. The movie shines because of the plot and brilliant performances of each of the actors." She described it as a captivating thriller with intelligent twists, maintaining an engaging pace throughout its runtime and offering a clever, suspense-filled experience that ends on a cliffhanger. Shubhra Gupta of The Indian Express rated the film three out of five stars, stating, "Neeraj Pandey’s Netflix film is a rare beast in Bollywood, a pulpy character study with twists you don’t see coming." She highlighted that the film is driven by a strong ensemble cast and a plot that continues to surprise, despite its contrivances and occasional plot holes, and praised its focus on storytelling over star power, making it a refreshing OTT offering.

Devesh Sharma of Filmfare rated the film three out of five stars, describing it as "A Humane Thriller With Twists Aplenty." He noted that the film is a slow-burn thriller with standout performances by Jimmy Sheirgill and Avinash Tiwary, despite some loose ends, uneven pacing, and a far-fetched climax. Neeraj Pandey crafts a compelling narrative with shades of noir, making it an interesting watch for fans of the genre. Anuj Kumar of The Hindu reviewed the film, stating, "Jimmy Shergill is on target in this ho-hum heist flick." He suggested that the film presents a compelling premise with a strong performance from Shergill but falls short due to excessive melodrama and predictable twists. While the film begins with promise, its slow pacing and lack of suspense lead to a missed opportunity, making it a superficial thriller stretched beyond its potential.

Chirag Sehgal of News18 awarded the film three and a half out of five stars, noting, "Avinash Tiwary Shines, Tamannaah Bhatia Has Little To Do In This Twisted Mystery." He pointed out that the film keeps viewers on edge with its surprising twists and compelling storytelling, although it underutilises its talented cast. While Avinash Tiwary excels, the film serves as a light, one-time watch, leaving room for a potential sequel. Archika Khurana of The Times of India rated the film three out of five stars, writing, "Neeraj Pandey’s heist-thriller struggles to maintain tension, despite strong performances." She noted that the film starts with an intriguing diamond heist and showcases strong performances, particularly by Jimmy Shergill and Avinash Tiwary, with Tamannaah Bhatia adding emotional depth as a single mother. While visually striking with moments of brilliance, its sluggish pacing and predictable twists make it a one-time watch for fans of the genre.

Rishabh Suri of Hindustan Times reviewed the film, describing it as "Neeraj Pandey’s Tom and Jerry-esque thriller is decent, far from perfect." He pointed out that it offers a strong start with an intriguing heist and compelling performances. However, the film falters due to a shift in tone midway, slow pacing, melodrama, and a predictable twist, preventing it from fully delivering on its thriller potential. Sonil Dedhia from Rediff.com rated the film two and a half out of five stars, calling it an "Underwhelming Thriller." He argued that it offers an intriguing premise and strong performances but struggles with uneven pacing and underdeveloped character arcs. While it has moments of suspense and moral ambiguity, the film fails to sustain tension, making it a one-time watch for fans of Neeraj Pandey’s work.

Zinia Bandyopadhyay of India Today awarded the film three out of five stars, commenting, "Runtime hampers the fate of Avinash Tiwary's drama." She noted that it offers a solid premise with strong performances, particularly from Avinash Tiwary and Jimmy Shergill, but falters due to its stretched runtime, uneven pacing, and underdeveloped screenplay. While it starts strong, the film ultimately becomes more of a melodrama than the gripping heist thriller it could have been, leaving hope for a more refined sequel.

== See also ==
- List of Netflix India originals
