= Shree Narayan Singh =

Indian film director and editor (born 1971)

- Born: 30 July 1971 (age 54); Balrampur, Uttar Pradesh, India
- Occupations: Film director Editor; Producer
- Years active: 2008–present

Shree Narayan Singh is an Indian film director and editor, known for films such as Toilet: Ek Prem Katha (2017), Batti Gul Meter Chalu (2018) and Yeh Jo Mohabbat Hai (2012).

== Career ==
Singh was born in Balrampur, UP. Before venturing into film direction, Singh worked as a film editor in films like A Wednesday (2008), Special 26 (2013), M.S. Dhoni: The Untold Story (2016) and Rustom (2016). He started his career as an editor for Don Muthu Swami and as a director in Yeh Jo Mohabbat Hai.

His second directorial was Toilet: Ek Prem Katha and it starred Akshay Kumar and Bhumi Pednekar. The film was produced by Ajit Andhare and Prernaa Arora, under the banner of Viacom 18 Motion Pictures and KriArj Entertainment. Made on a budget of ₹ 750 million, the film grossed ₹ 1.68 billion in domestic areas and ₹ 2 billion in the worldwide areas. Singh was nominated for Filmfare awards under the best director category for the film Toilet: Ek Prem Katha.

In February 2018, it was announced that Singh would be directing Batti Gul Meter Chalu which stars Shahid Kapoor, Shraddha Kapoor and Yami Gautam in lead roles and is produced by Bhushan Kumar and Krishan Kumar under T-Series and Prernaa Arora under KriArj Entertainment.

== Filmography ==
Year	Film	Director(s)	Producer(s)	Editor(s)
2008	Don Muthu Swami			Yes
2008	A Wednesday			Yes
2011	Taryanche Bait			Yes
2011	Gandhi To Hitler			Yes
2012	Yeh Jo Mohabbat Hai	Yes		
2013	Special 26			Yes
2013	Hum Hai Raahi Car Ke			Yes
2014	Total Siyappa			Yes
2015	Baby			Yes
2016	Rustom			Yes
2016	M.S. Dhoni: The Untold Story			Yes
2016	Saat Uchakkey			Yes
2017	Toilet: Ek Prem Katha	Yes		Yes
2018	Missing			Yes
2018	Batti Gul Meter Chalu	Yes	Yes	Yes
2022	Sutliyan	Yes		
