= Naam Shabana =

2017 Indian action thriller film by Shivam Nair

- Theatrical release poster
- Directed by: Shivam Nair
- Written by: Neeraj Pandey
- Produced by: Neeraj Pandey; Shital Bhatia; Aruna Bhatia
- Starring: Taapsee Pannu; Manoj Bajpayee; Prithviraj Sukumaran
- Cinematography: Sudheer Palsane
- Edited by: Praveen Kathikuloth
- Music by: Songs: Rochak Kohli; Meet Bros; Background Score: Sanjoy Chowdhury
- Production companies: T-Series Films; Cape Of Good Films; Reliance Entertainment; Friday Filmworks; Plan C Studios
- Distributed by: T-Series Films; Reliance Entertainment
- Release date: March 31, 2017 (India)
- Running time: 147 minutes
- Country: India
- Language: Hindi
- Budget: ₹25 crore
- Box office: ₹56.09 crore

Naam Shabana (transl. The name is Shabana) is a 2017 Indian Hindi action thriller film directed by Shivam Nair, written and produced by Neeraj Pandey. It is the second instalment of Baby franchise and a spin-off of the 2015 film Baby, it stars Taapsee Pannu reprising her role as Shabana Khan from the original alongside Manoj Bajpayee and Prithviraj Sukumaran with an ensemble supporting cast. Akshay Kumar, Madhurima Tuli, Elli AvrRam, Anupam Kher, Danny Denzongpa, Murali Sharma, Taher Shabbir and Shibani Dandekar in special appearances.

The film was dubbed into Telugu and Tamil languages and released on 31 March 2017. The Tamil title was Naanthan Shabana whereas the Telugu title was Nene Shabana.

The film was banned in Pakistan a day after its release. The film received mixed reviews, but was a commercial success.

== Plot ==
The film shows the origin story of Shabana Khan, who works as a proficient field agent with Ajay Singh. It begins with two Indian agents working under Ranvir Singh chasing an international arms dealer named Mikhail. However, he kills them both and escapes.

A year later, Shabana, a college student who trains as a Kūdō fighter, appears on the agency's radar and starts being followed by them as a potential recruit. One of her friends, Jai, who is in love with her, asks her on a date and confesses his love for her. He asks her about her past, and she tells him that she had been kept in juvenile detention for killing her abusive father, who used to physically assault her mother. This event is what brought her to the agency's attention. During their bike ride home, Shabana is a victim of eve teasing from a group of four drunk men in a jeep, resulting in Jai getting killed and the assailants fleeing. The main assailant, Karan, escapes justice after being identified as the son of an influential man.

Frustrated with the police, Shabana receives a call from an unknown number asking if she wants to avenge Jai's death. The caller, agent Ranvir Singh, agrees to help her take out the killer in exchange for Shabana joining a secret agency. Shabana agrees and receives information on the killer's whereabouts and the promised help that will aid her in killing them. She travels to Goa, where the killers are currently lying low. Keeping watch at a club, she is protected by another agent, whom Ranvir tells her is their best. When she asks why they are helping her, Ranvir tells her she is indispensable to them, and since this is important to her, they will help her as best they can. She decides to kill only Karan, leaving his friends to live in fear for their lives. After she kills him in his hotel room, Ajay Singh, who protected her at the club, helps her escape.

Following this, Shabana is recruited into the secret agency on a trial basis, where she receives extensive training in physical fitness and fighting techniques. The story then focuses on a global arms dealer and supplier, Mikhail. Three Indian agents track down Tony, Mikhail's right-hand man. Tony tips them off to a German doctor who has surgically changed Mikhail's face. By the time the agency contacts the doctor to find out how Mikhail looks, Tony kills all three agents and escapes, revealing that he is Mikhail. Ranvir discovers Mikhail is planning another plastic surgery to change his face.

Shabana is sent to kill him with Ajay and Omprakash Shukla's help this time. Shabana enters the operation theatre disguised as a patient and is about to kill Mikhail. To her surprise, he is awake, as he had refused to take anesthesia during the operation. After a fight in which Mikhail almost strangles Shabana, she finally manages to kill him and escape from the police with Ajay's help.

== Cast ==
- Taapsee Pannu as Shabana Khan
- Manoj Bajpayee as Agent Ranvir Singh
- Prithviraj Sukumaran as Tony Cake / Mikhail Warli
  - Rajesh Bhati as Mikhail (before Plastic surgery)
- Veerendra Saxena as Cableman, Ranvir's employee and Shabana's employer
- Arjun Singh Shekhawat as Prashant
- Bhaskar B V as Srini, a RAW Agent
- Zakir Hussain as Gupta, a RAW agent
- Bhuvan Arora as Karan Singh, Jai's murderer
- Natasha Rastogi as Farida Begum Khan, Shabana's mother
- Manav Vij as Ravi Ahuja, a RAW agent
- Mohan Kapur as a college professor
- Jagannath Nivangune as Inspector
- Aparna Upadhyay as Mrs. Pal, Jai's mother
- Divyangana Jain as Shabana's friend

Special appearances

- Akshay Kumar as Ajay Singh Rajput
- Madhurima Tuli as Anjali Singh Rajput, Ajay's wife
- Anupam Kher as Omprakash Shukla, Ajay's aide
- Danny Denzongpa as Feroz Ali Khan
- Murali Sharma as Mr. Samir Gupta
- Elli AvrRam as Sona, Tony's friend and Malik's girlfriend
- Taher Shabbir as Jai Pal, Shabana's deceased love interest
- Shibani Dandekar as an item dancer in the song "Baby Besharam"

== Production ==
=== Development ===
Taapsee Pannu was trained in mixed martial arts for her role in the film. In October 2016, Prithviraj Sukumaran joined the cast of the film and shot for a cameo role. Akshay Kumar was signed to play a cameo in the film, reprising his role from the previous film. Anupam Kher was signed to play the role of Omprakash Shukla, reprising his role from the previous film. French stuntman Cyril Raffaelli was signed to choreograph the stunts of the film. For the preparation of the role of Pannu's character as a spy, producer Neeraj Pandey took guidance from a full time consultant, an ex-intelligence officer.Varun Dhawan was also rumoured to be a part of the film, however, the actor claimed later that he was not part of the film. (Note: Initially, it was rumored that Dhawan was to be a part of the film which is not a sequel. Dhawan later cleared about his involvement and being not a part of the film.)

=== Filming ===
Principal photography of the film's first schedule began in September 2016 in Malaysia, where Kumar and Pannu shot for stunt sequences. Filming of the first schedule was completed in late October 2016. The film's second schedule was started in November 2016 in Mumbai. The shooting of the film was wrapped up in February 2017.

== Music ==
The songs of the film are composed by Rochak Kohli and Meet Bros. Lyrics are written by Manoj Muntashir and Kumaar and released by T-Series. The film score is composed by Sanjoy Chowdhury.

Track listing
No.	Title	Lyrics	Music	Singer(s)	Length
1.	"Rozana"	Manoj Muntashir	Rochak Kohli	Shreya Ghoshal	4:34
2.	"Zinda"	Manoj Muntashir	Rochak Kohli	Sunidhi Chauhan	4:00
3.	"Zubi Zubi"	Manoj Muntashir	Rochak Kohli	Sukriti Kakar, Rochak Kohli	4:10
4.	"Dil Hua Besharam"	Kumaar	Meet Bros	Aditi Singh Sharma	3:46
Total length:					16:30

Tamil tracklist
No.	Title	Lyrics	Music	Singer(s)	Length
1.	"Naalumaney"	Rajesh Malarvannan	Rochak Kohli	Chinmayi	4:34
2.	"Yeadho Konjamey"	Rajesh Malarvannan	Rochak Kohli	Janani Madhan	4:00
3.	"Zubi Zubi"	Rajesh Malarvannan	Rochak Kohli	Rita, Rochak Kohli	4:10
4.	"Paayindhidum"	Rajesh Malarvannan	Meet Bros	Nincy Vincent	3:46
Total length:					16:30

== Release ==
On April 9, 2017, the film was banned in Pakistan by its Central Board of Film Censors. It had been shown in Pakistan starting on March 31, 2017, as long as certain scenes with a terrorism theme were cut. One day after an Islamabad theatre showed an uncut version the film was banned from all theatres in the country.

== Reception ==
=== Box office ===
The film was produced on a budget of ₹25 crores. Its first-day gross was approximately ₹32 crore, and the film finished its first weekend with an estimated gross of ₹70 crores. The film was a decent performer with above average collection.

=== Critical response ===
On the review aggregator website Rotten Tomatoes, 29% of 9 critics' reviews are positive, with an average rating of 2.2/10. The website's consensus reads: "Taapsee delivers some knockout punches and is sincere enough. Manoj is brilliant, though he has just dialogue-baazi and no action to support him. As for Akshay, he is happy to lend his superstar-presence and bask in the girl power."

Shubhra Gupta of The Indian Express wrote, "What does come as a surprise, however, is just how much of a drag the film is. Except for a few stray sequences in which the limber Taapsee Pannu goes after the bad guys, and the ones in which co-star Akshay Kumar moves in to demonstrate how the big boys do it, there is nothing either novel or interesting about the film".

== See also ==
- List of films banned in Pakistan
