= Tere Sang Yaara =

2016 romantic song

Song by Atif Aslam

from the album Rustom
- Language: Hindi
- Released: 6 July 2016
- Genre: Filmi, Indian pop
- Length: 4:58 (Audio) 04:54 (Video)
- Label: Zee Music Company
- Composer: Arko Pravo Mukherjee
- Lyricist: Manoj Muntashir

"Tere Sang Yaara" (transl. With you, friend) is a romantic song written by Manoj Muntashir, composed by Arko Pravo Mukherjee, and sung by the Pakistani singer Atif Aslam. The song is from the soundtrack of the 2016 Hindi film Rustom. The song's music video featured actors Akshay Kumar and Ileana D'Cruz.

== Release ==
The song released on 6 July 2016 by Zee Music Company on YouTube. The official video has received 82 million on YouTube as of August 2020. The audio version has released over 135 million views as of August 2020.

== Reception ==
Times of India acclaimed the visuals of the music video as well as the lyrics and composition of the song. They wrote, "The chemistry between the lead pair (Akshay & Ileana) is impeccable and beautifully complements the soulful composition by Arko. The melody is dipped in romance and emotions, with heartfelt lyrics by Manoj Muntashir which reach out to your soul instantly. This dreamy song is just the perfect love story we all dream about".

Indian Express in its review wrote, "Pakistani singer Atif Aslam has lent his voice to the soulful track, which creates magic with the heartfelt lyrics penned by Manoj Muntashir and soulful composition of music director Arko [...] The song shows Akshay (Rustom Pavri) who falls in love with Ileana at first sight and expresses his love in the most subtle way. From proposing to getting married, the song gives us a glimpse of his life".
