= Toilet: Ek Prem Katha =

2017 Indian film by Shree Narayan Singh

- Theatrical release posters
- Directed by: Shree Narayan Singh
- Written by: Siddharth–Garima
- Produced by: Viacom18 Motion Pictures; Aruna Bhatia; Shital Bhatia; Prerna Arora; Arjun N. Kapoor; Neeraj Pandey
- Starring: Akshay Kumar; Bhumi Pednekar; Anupam Kher
- Cinematography: Anshuman Mahaley
- Edited by: Shree Narayan Singh
- Music by: Vickey Prasad; Manas-Shikhar; Sachet–Parampara
- Production companies: Viacom18 Motion Pictures; KriArj Entertainment; Cape of Good Films; Plan C Studios
- Distributed by: Viacom18 Motion Pictures
- Release date: 11 August 2017 (India)
- Running time: 155 minutes
- Country: India
- Language: Hindi
- Budget: ₹75 crore
- Box office: est. ₹311.5 crore

Toilet: Ek Prem Katha (transl. Toilet: A Love Story) or simply Toilet, is a 2017 Indian Hindi-language comedy-drama film directed by Shree Narayan Singh. Co-produced by Akshay Kumar and Neeraj Pandey, the film stars Akshay Kumar and Bhumi Pednekar, with campaigns to improve sanitation conditions in India, with an emphasis on the eradication of open defecation, which is still a problem, especially in rural areas.

It was reported that the movie is based on the true story of Anita Narre from Madhya Pradesh, who refused to go back to her husband Shivram's home because it had no toilet. In fact, after the ending of the film, a photograph of Narre couple is shown with Bhumi Pednekar, and this fact is mentioned as a subtitle. In the beginning of the film too, it is narrated that the film is inspired by a true incident, although the name of real characters comes only towards the end.

The film released on 11 August 2017. It received mixed reviews from critics for the scripting and performances of lead actors. It was a commercial success domestically as well as overseas, particularly in China. It became Kumar's highest-grossing film of all time and the fourth highest grossing Indian film of the year grossing ₹311.02 crore worldwide.

The film received three nominations at the 63rd Filmfare Awards: Best Film, Best Director for Narayan Singh and Best Actor for Akshay Kumar.

== Plot ==
In an Indian village Nandgaon, Uttar Pradesh, a group of women go to a field, away from their village near Nandgaon in the early hours of the day to defecate in the open, behind the cover of bushes. Keshav has to marry a black buffalo because his father Pandit Vimalnath Sharma is a very religious and superstitious priest, and he believes that his son's marriage to a black buffalo will help improve Keshav's fortune.

Percentage of population with access to decent sanitation, 2015. Note that the map predates Swachh Bharat's major advances.

Keshav meets Jaya, an educated college going girl, falls in love with her and eventually convinces her to marry him. However, Keshav's father is of the view that Keshav's horoscope is such that he can and should only marry a girl who has two thumbs on her left hand. Since Jaya does not fulfill this requirement, Keshav has an artificial thumb made and gives it to Jaya who wears it as a ring on her thumb. Keshav's unsuspecting father agrees to their marriage.

On her first morning in Keshav's house, Jaya reluctantly goes to a field to defecate, but comes back agitated without defecating and complains about it to Keshav. Despite Keshav's repeated attempts to convince Jaya to give up her stubbornness about needing a toilet, Jaya remains steadfast. He makes a couple of temporary adjustments to solve the problem, first taking her to a neighbour's house which has a portable toilet for a bedridden elderly woman, and later in a train that has a seven-minute stop at the village railway station, without actually constructing a toilet in his house, but after a while, one day she gets locked up in the toilet and train departs the station and agitated and frustrated Jaya leaves Keshav and moves back to her parents' house.

After a futile attempt to convince his sarpanch and villagers to build toilets in the village, Keshav, with the help of Jaya, contacts the concerned regulatory authority and starts the construction of a toilet in his front yard. When the construction is finished, Keshav's father and the sarpanch arrange to demolish the toilet while Keshav is still asleep. But Keshav wakes up before the toilet is completely destroyed and protects it from complete demolition.

Jaya now files for a divorce in the local court citing the unavailability of a toilet in her husband's house as the primary reason for seeking a divorce. Due to its unique nature, the case receives much media attention. Politicians and the concerned government departments spring into action to hasten the construction of toilets in Keshav's village. But Keshav's father remains steadfast on his decision to not have a toilet in his house, until one day, his mother, while going out to defecate, falls on the doorstep, injures her hip and cries vehemently that she can't possibly walk to the fields to defecate, and that she must use the toilet that Keshav constructed in the front yard. After much reluctance, Keshav's father gives in and helps his mother to the toilet. He then realises that a toilet is indeed a critical requirement within a household.

On the day of the hearing of the divorce case of Keshav and Jaya, the judge gets an official notice from the Chief Minister's office urging the judge to not grant their divorce as the construction of toilets in their village shall be started the very next day. The couple comes out together happily. Keshav's father apologises to Jaya for his stubbornness. In the end credits, villagers are shown lining up to use mobile toilets outside their village while the construction of toilets throughout the village proceeds.

== Cast ==
- Akshay Kumar as Keshav Sharma
- Bhumi Pednekar as Jaya Sharma (Nee' Joshi)
- Divyendu Sharma as Narayan ("Naru") Sharma
- Anupam Kher as Dinanath ("DJ Kakka") Joshi
- Sudhir Pandey as Pandit Vimalnath Sharma ("Panditji" or "Vimu"), Keshav and Naru's father
- Atul Srivastava as Mr. Jagdish Joshi, Jaya's father
- Ayesha Raza Mishra as Vidya Joshi, Jaya's mother
- Rajesh Sharma as Mathur
- Shubha Khote as Rampyari ("Dadi") Sharma, Keshav's grandmother
- Mukesh S Bhatt as Rastogi
- Kimti Anand as Pradhan
- Rati Shankar Tripathi as Sarpanch
- Sachin Khedekar as Director (cameo)
- Sana Khan as Keshav's unnamed lover (cameo)
- Khushboo Sawan as Meena, Jaya's friend
- Richa Tiwari as Reporter
- Akash Singh Rajput as Reporter
- Aasif Khan as Reporter (cameo)

== Production ==
=== Development ===
The film was written by Siddharth Singh and Garima Wahal, the writers of the 2013 Hindi film Goliyon Ki Raasleela Ram-Leela. It shares some similarities with a true event in which 19-year-old Priyanka Bharti fled her husband's home in 2012 when there was no toilet. In the film, before the end credits, Toilet mentions that it is based on the story of Anita Narre from Madhya Pradesh, who refused to go back to her husband Shivram's home because it had no toilet.

Filmmaker Praveen Vyas sent a legal notice to the makers, claiming that Toilet- Ek Prem Katha plagiarised scenes and dialogues from his documentary Manini, based on the same subject.

=== Marketing ===
Prime Minister Narendra Modi called it a good effort to further the message of cleanliness, as per Swachh Bharat Abhiyan. In December 2017, Bill Gates listed Toilet: Ek Prem Katha as one of the six positive things that happened in 2017.

Akshay Kumar dug a toilet in Madhya Pradesh to promote the film. The movie trailer was released on 11 June 2017.

== Reception ==
On the review aggregator website Rotten Tomatoes, Toilet Ek Prem Katha has an approval rating of 21% based on 14 reviews, with an average rating of 5/10. Meena Iyer of The Times of India gave the film 4 stars out of 5, saying, "Director Shree Narayan Singh holds up a mirror to society, showing us how our superstitious villagers, lazy administration and corrupt politicians have actually converted India into the world’s largest shit-pond. Women especially, are treated more insensitively than cattle!" Shubhra Gupta of The Indian Express gave the film a rating of 2 stars out of 5 and said, "It’s fitting that Akshay Kumar has greenlit and played the lead in this film, which is more a primer of How To Break Social Taboos and Make Toilets rather than a powerful social drama".

Bollywood Hungama praised the performances of the lead actors of the film but criticized the long length and inconsistent screenplay, and concluded the review by giving the film a rating of 3 stars out of 5, saying that, "On the whole, Toilet – Ek Prem Katha, despite the minuses, integrates a strong social message with entertainment wonderfully and also questions several age old practises in the society." Rachit Gupta of Filmfare gave the film a rating of 3.5 stars out of 5 and said, "Toilet – Ek Prem Katha is a solid entertainer with a strong social message. It may not have the most polished screenplay, but director Shree Narayan Singh's deft handling of the subject makes the most out of its noble intentions."

Rajeev Masand of News18 gave the film 2.5 out of 5 stars and said, "It’s clear the film has its heart in the right place but the blatant pandering gets tiresome. Akshay Kumar brings just the right amount of levity and Bhumi Pednekar shines. It’s the sloppy writing that is the culprit here. Toilet Ek Prem Katha had potential but it’s only sporadically entertaining." Rohit Vats of Hindustan Times gave it 2.5 stars out of 5, saying, "Ek Prem Katha endorses the Indian government’s Swacch Bharat Abhiyaan so seriously that after a point it starts to look like that Priyanka Bharti ad featuring Vidya Balan".

Writing for The Hindu, Namrata Joshi said, "While some amount of potential (eventually lost) is visible in the first half, the second half of the film ends in a total mess". Anna MM of Firstpost rated it 1.5/5, saying, "The tragedy of Toilet: Ek Prem Katha is that minus stalking and the chamchagiri, it could have been a good film". Saibal Chaterjee of NDTV gave the film 2/5 stars, and said, "When what should at best have been a ten-minute public service film bloats into a two-and-a-half-hour, patience-testing, yawn-inducing Bollywood puff-job for a government scheme, it is bound to stink to high heaven. Toilet: Ek Prem Katha does".

Rohit Bhatnagar of Deccan Chronicle gave the film 3.5/5 and said, "Akshay Kumar, Bhumi Pednekar and Divyendu Sharma are sure to win you over with their quirky yet brilliant acts". Anupama Chopra of Film Companion gave the film 2.5 out of 5 stars and said, "The second half becomes a litany of lectures, brazen plugs for the government, tedious song sequences, a 3000-crore toilet scam and an inexplicable change of heart...everything is stitched together hurriedly. There is too much preaching and not enough punch. At over two and a half hours, it’s too long and not very satisfying." Raja Sen of NDTV gave the film 2 out of 5 stars and said, "Akshay Kumar is sincere, but this film is too painfully long and preachy to be effective."

Prime Minister Narendra Modi called it a good effort to further the message of cleanliness, as per Swachh Bharat Abhiyan. In December 2017, Bill Gates listed Toilet: Ek Prem Katha as one of the six positive things that happened in 2017.

== Box office ==
The film released on 11 August 2017, before India's independence day. The film grossed ₹311.5 crore (US$45.55 million) worldwide, becoming Akshay Kumar's highest-grossing film, and his first film to enter the 300 crore club.

Toilet: Ek Prem Katha worldwide gross revenue breakdown
Territories	Gross revenue
India	₹186.42 crore (US$28.63 million)
China	$14.36 million (₹97.34 crore)
Other territories	₹30.16 crore (US$4.63 million)
Worldwide total	₹311.5 crore (US$45.55 million)

=== Domestic ===
The film collected ₹13.10 crore (US$2.01 million) in India on the first day. The film became Kumar's 9th biggest opening film. The film grossed Rs 132 crore in India, and emerged as the highest-grossing film of Kumar.

=== Overseas ===
On first day, the film collected ₹16.66 lakh (US$25,582.91) from 16 screens in Australia and ₹5.79 lakh (US$8,891.06) from eight screens in New Zealand. Toilet grossed $2,250,000 on its opening weekend overseas. The film was re-titled as Toilet Hero in China for Chinese audiences. The film collected ₹91.31 crore (US$13.35 million) in 7 days at the Chinese box office. By its 17th day, the film had grossed $14.36 million (₹97.34 crore) in China.

== Soundtrack ==
Toilet: Ek Prem Katha

Soundtrack album by Vickey Prasad, Manas-Shikhar, Sachet–Parampara
- Released: 13 July 2017
- Genre: Feature film soundtrack
- Length: 21:00
- Language: Hindi
- Label: T-Series
External audio
- Audio Jukebox on YouTube

The soundtrack of the film was composed by Vickey Prasad, Manas-Shikhar and Sachet–Parampara and the lyrics were written by Siddharth-Garima. The first track of the film, titled "Hans Mat Pagli", sung by Sonu Nigam and Shreya Ghoshal, was released online on 28 June 2017. The second track, "Bakheda", sung by Sukhwinder Singh and Sunidhi Chauhan, was released on 5 July 2017. The third song released was "Gori Tu Latth Maar", sung by Sonu Nigam and Palak Muchhal, and released on 12 July 2017. The soundtrack was released on 13 July 2017 by T-Series and consists of five songs. The song "Toilet Ka Jugaad", sung by Akshay Kumar and Vickey Prasad, was included in the film but was not released along with the soundtrack. It was released on 4 August 2017.

All lyrics are written by Siddharth-Garima.

Track listing
No.	Title	Music	Singer(s)	Length
1.	"Hans Mat Pagli"	Vickey Prasad	Sonu Nigam, Shreya Ghoshal	5:18
2.	"Bakheda"	Vickey Prasad	Sukhwinder Singh, Sunidhi Chauhan	3:27
3.	"Gori Tu Latth Maar"	Manas Shikhar	Sonu Nigam, Palak Muchhal	3:58
4.	"Subah Ki Train"	Sachet–Parampara	Sachet–Parampara	3:45
5.	"Toilet Ka Jugaad"	Vickey Prasad	Akshay Kumar, Vickey Prasad	4:32
Total length:				21:00

== Accolades ==
Date of ceremony	Award	Category	Recipient(s) and nominee(s)	Result	Ref.
2 December 2017	Star Screen Awards	Best Actor – Male (Popular)	Akshay Kumar	Nominated	
30 December 2017	Zee Cine Awards	Best Film (Viewer's Choice)	Toilet: Ek Prem Katha	Won	
30 December 2017	Zee Cine Awards	Best Film (Jury's Choice)	Toilet: Ek Prem Katha	Nominated	
30 December 2017	Zee Cine Awards	Extraordinary Impact	Toilet: Ek Prem Katha	Won	
30 December 2017	Zee Cine Awards	Best Actor – Male (Viewer's Choice)	Akshay Kumar	Nominated	
30 December 2017	Zee Cine Awards	Best Actor – Male (Jury's Choice)	Akshay Kumar	Nominated	
30 December 2017	Zee Cine Awards	Best Actor – Female (Viewer's Choice)	Bhumi Pednekar	Nominated	
30 December 2017	Zee Cine Awards	Best Actor – Female (Jury's Choice)	Bhumi Pednekar	Nominated	
30 December 2017	Zee Cine Awards	Best Debutant Director	Shree Narayan Singh	Nominated	
30 December 2017	Zee Cine Awards	Best Director	Shree Narayan Singh	Nominated	
30 December 2017	Zee Cine Awards	Best Writing	Siddharth Singh, Garima Wahal	Nominated	
20 January 2018	Filmfare Awards	Best Film	Toilet: Ek Prem Katha	Nominated	
20 January 2018	Filmfare Awards	Best Director	Shree Narayan Singh	Nominated	
20 January 2018	Filmfare Awards	Best Actor	Akshay Kumar	Nominated	
28 January 2018	Mirchi Music Awards	Upcoming Music Composer of The Year	Vickey Prasad (for the song "Hans Mat Pagli")	Nominated	
3 May 2018	National Film Awards	Best Choreography	Ganesh Acharya (for the song "Gori Tu Latth Maar")	Won	
13 May 2018	Matri Shree Media Award	Best Feature Film	Toilet: Ek Prem Katha	Won	
22 June 2018	International Indian Film Academy Awards	Best Film	Toilet: Ek Prem Katha	Nominated	
22 June 2018	International Indian Film Academy Awards	Best Actor	Akshay Kumar	Nominated	
22 June 2018	International Indian Film Academy Awards	Best Story	Siddharth Singh, Garima Wahal	Nominated	
