= Tatra Truck scam =

Truck supply scam

Tatra Truck scam is a scam that came to light in 2012 involving the sale of some 7,000 trucks to the Indian army over a period of more than two decades. Tatra is a truck manufacturing company based in the Czech Republic. The allegation is that the Tatra trucks were sold at a very high cost to the Indian army through an unusual route. Following is the flow in which the Tatra deal happened.

- Tatra sold trucks first to a Hong Kong-based company called Venus Projects at a 35% discount. The company is the trading arm of Vectra Worldwide. If the deal had been made directly with India, the discount benefits would have been availed by the Indian army.
- Further, the trucks were purchased by Tatra Sipox (UK) Ltd from Venus Projects. Tatra Sipox is another subsidiary of Vectra Worldwide.
- Tatra Sipox sold the trucks to BEML, a company owned by the government of India, at an inflated price after adding the profit.
- These trucks were then purchased by the Indian Army from BEML for a further 25 to 35 percent more.

The Indian Army (original buyer) ended up purchasing the trucks for 100 to 120 percent more than the factory price. Approximately INR 170 crores cash flow into an Indian company was being predicted in relation to this scam.
