= Baby (2015 Hindi film) =

2015 film directed by Neeraj Pandey

- Theatrical release poster
- Directed by: Neeraj Pandey
- Written by: Neeraj Pandey
- Produced by: Bhushan Kumar; Aruna Bhatia; Shital Bhatia; Krishan Kumar
- Starring: Akshay Kumar; Danny Denzongpa; Rana Daggubati; Taapsee Pannu; Anupam Kher; Kay Kay Menon
- Narrated by: Danny Denzongpa
- Cinematography: Sudeep Chatterjee; Sudheer Palsane
- Edited by: Shree Narayan Singh
- Music by: Songs: M. M. Kreem; Meet Bros. Anjjan; Score: Sanjoy Chowdhury
- Production companies: T-Series Films; Friday Filmworks; Cape of Good Films; Crouching Tiger Motion Pictures
- Distributed by: AA Films
- Release date: January 23, 2015 (India)
- Running time: 159 minutes
- Country: India
- Language: Hindi
- Budget: ₹25 crore
- Box office: ₹143 crore

Baby is a 2015 Indian Hindi-language spy action thriller film written and directed by Neeraj Pandey. It is the first installment of Baby franchise and stars Akshay Kumar, Danny Denzongpa, Rana Daggubati, Taapsee Pannu, Kay Kay Menon, Anupam Kher, and Sushant Singh. Named after a fictional elite team of the Indian Intelligence system, it follows the team's perpetual strife to eliminate terrorists and their plots, during which an officer leads a team to destroy one such potentially lethal operation.

Baby marked Pandey's third feature film endeavour as a writer and director, as well as his third with Kher after A Wednesday! (2008) and Special 26 (2013), which also marked his maiden collaboration with Kumar. Filming began on 4 September 2014 in Greater Noida, Uttar Pradesh. It was shot in Gautam Buddha University, Nepal, Abu Dhabi and Istanbul.

Baby was released on 23 January 2015 to generally received positive reviews from critics who praised its screenwriting, direction, action sequences and Kumar's performance. It was a commercial success at the box office, grossing over ₹1.43 billion (US$15 million) worldwide. A spin-off titled Naam Shabana began filming in September 2016, with Pannu in the lead role as Shabana Khan and Kumar reprising his role as Ajay Singh Rajput in a cameo appearance. It was released on 31 March 2017.

== Plot ==
A temporary task force headed by Feroz Ali Khan is formed in response to the 26/11 attacks in India, the job being to find and eliminate terrorists planning attacks in India. While attempting to rescue a fellow secret agent in Turkey, Ajay Singh Rajput captures a former colleague-turned-traitor, Jamaal. Frightened, Ajay threatens to have his family killed unless he provides the information about a terror attack plan. Jamaal tells Ajay about a plot to carry out a bomb blast in a Delhi shopping mall, which Ajay is able to prevent with help from Jai. Jamaal then taunts Ajay saying that this was only the first of a series of massive attacks that the terrorists had planned and commits suicide.

Pakistan-based terrorist mastermind Maulana Mohammed Abdul Rehman is causing trouble near the India-Pakistan border. He plans an escape plan for Bilal Khan, a dangerous terrorist lodged in a prison in Mumbai. For this purpose, Bilal assigns another terrorist Javed Ali Khan who arrives in Mumbai via Dubai. Soon after, Bilal escapes from police custody and flees the country. The Indian agencies are alerted to Javed's arrival and a team of ATS officers, led by Ajay, is dispatched to interrogate Taufiq, an ISI agent posing as a local Muslim leader. Ajay manages to get information on Javed after torturing Taufiq and raids Javed's hideout. However, things go haywire when all the officers except Ajay get killed along with Javed after the latter triggers a suicide explosion.

The agency is able to retrieve the remains of Javed's laptop and find a name from the hard drive: Wasim Sheikh, a logistics planner for the terrorist groups, living in Nepal under the name of Abdul Haq. Ajay and Shabana Khan travel to Nepal pretending to be a married couple. Their plan to capture Wasim goes awry when he finds out that Shabana is a covert operative. However, Shabana fights with him and knocks him unconscious and the duo bring Wasim back to India. Afraid of the torture that he might face, Wasim reveals all the information that the agency wants. He tells them that Bilal is in Al-Dera in Saudi Arabia and will travel to Karachi to launch a lethal attack on numerous locations in India.

Feroz sends Ajay, Jai and frequent collaborator Om Prakash Shukla, an expert hacker, to meet their deep asset, Ashfaq, in Al-Dera. Bilal is holding meetings in Al-Dera to discuss the funding and execution of the terrorist attacks. With Shukla's help, Ajay and Jai break into Bilal's room and kill him. As they are about to return, they find that Maulana is also present in the suite. Jai knocks him out. They decide to bring him back to India, under the pretext that he is Ashfaq's uncle who needs to visit India for an urgent liver transplant. They manage to get a visa from the local authorities for Maulana (being shown as Ashfaq's ill uncle), but the hotel security discovers Bilal's corpse. Police Chief Hani Mohammad starts investigating Bilal's death. He quickly identifies Ajay and his team as Indian agents.

Maulana regains consciousness and suddenly attacks and wounds Ajay, who manages to subdue him. Meanwhile, Ajay and his team then board the plane, but Hani contacts the ATC and asks them to stop the aircraft. However, when he sees a newspaper that reveals that Maulana and Bilal are wanted terrorists with an international bounty on their heads, he smiles and lets the plane take off without any further hindrance. A voice-over by Feroz reveals that Maulana was brought to India, but his capture was kept a secret. After 6 weeks of rigorous interrogation, when Maulana had nothing substantial left to contribute, he was handed over to the Indian Army and taken to Srinagar, where he was given the same treatment by the army as given to militants (implying that he was eliminated). The trial run is successful, and the temporary task force is given permanent status where the agents celebrate their victory.

== Cast ==
- Akshay Kumar as Ajay Singh Rajput / Rafiq Khan / Rahul Awasthi
- Danny Denzongpa as Feroz Ali Khan, Ajay's boss
- Rana Daggubati as Jai Singh Rathod / Vijay Sharma
- Taapsee Pannu as Shabana Khan / Shabana Kaif, an undercover agent
- Anupam Kher as Omprakash Shukla / Brijmohan Singh
- Kay Kay Menon as Bilal Khan / Firdaus Ali / Jameel Rashid
- Jameel Khan as Taufiq Aalam
- Sushant Singh as Wasim Khan / Abdul Haq
- Madhurima Tuli as Anjali Rajput, Ajay's wife
- Mikaal Zulfiqar as Ashfaque Qazi
- Hasan Noman as Hani Mohammed, Officer of Al-Dera Police who investigates Bilal's murder
- Rasheed Naz as Maulana Mohammed Abdul Rehman / Abbas Sheikh, loosely based on Hafiz Saeed
- Amar Talwar as Minister Dhanraj Pradhan
- Murali Sharma as Jagdish Gupta, Pradhan's secretary
- Sanjeev Tyagi as Sharan, a police officer
- Karan Aanand as Jamal
- Rumi Khan as Javed Ali Khan
- Niharica Raizada as Priya Jhaveri, a reporter
- Sajjad Delafrooz as Saudi Arabian Doctor
- Esha Gupta in a special appearance in the song "Beparwah"

== Production ==
Baby was produced under T-Series along with Crouching Tiger, Friday Filmworks and Cape of Good Films. The filming began on 4 September 2014, in Greater Noida, Uttar Pradesh. Some filming was done in Gautam Buddha University, at Meditation Hall, Shanti Sarover and Library, at Greater Noida. The second part was shot in Nepal and the team completed their final schedule in Abu Dhabi in October. Some parts were also shot in Istanbul. Sajjad Delafrooz was hired to play the role of the Saudi doctor.

== Soundtrack ==
Baby

Soundtrack album by: Meet Bros Anjjan; M. M. Kreem
- Released: 23 January 2015
- Genre: Feature film soundtrack
- Length: 17:38
- Label: T-Series

The songs for the film features songs composed by M. M. Kreem and Meet Bros Anjjan. Lyrics were written by Manoj Muntashir.

The film score was composed by Sanjoy Chowdhury.

All lyrics are written by Manoj Muntashir.

Track listing
No.	Title	Singer(s)	Length
1.	"Beparwah"	Meet Bros Anjjan, Apeksha Dandekar	5:13
2.	"Main Tujhse Pyaar Nahin Karta"	Papon	4:13
3.	"Beparwah" (MBA Swag)	Meet Bros Anjjan, Earl Edgar	4:22
4.	"Main Tujhse Pyaar Nahin Karti"	Ramya Behara	3:50
Total length:			17:38

== Release ==
Baby was released on 23 January 2015.

== Reception ==
Baby received positive reviews from critics who praised Kumar's performance, action sequences, direction and writing.

=== Critical response ===
Subhash K. Jha gave the film 4.5 stars out of 5 and stated,"Baby is one helluva roller-coaster ride. Miss it at your own risk." Sarita A Tanwar of Daily News and Analysis gave the movie 4 stars, describing Akshay Kumar's performance in the movie as his career-best. Anuj Kumar of The Hindu summarized the film as "A gripping espionage thriller that eschews drama and jingoism". Srijana Mitra Das of The Times of India also gave it 4 stars out of 5 and said, "Akshay Kumar is terrific as Ajay whose core of steel you can almost feel". Hindustan Times gave the movie 4 stars out of 5 too, calling the film "sleek, well-timed and engaging." Yahoo Movies gave the film 4 stars and wrote, "The film deals with a definite conflict, backs it up with a coherent plot trajectory and delivers a compelling resolution." Anupama Chopra gave the film 3.5 stars and stating that the movie will make the viewers forget Akshay's cinematic misdemeanours. Rajeev Masand gave the film 3 stars, hailing its action sequences and performance of the cast. Shubhra Gupta of The Indian Express gave the film 2 stars. However, Gupta praised Akshay Kumar's performance. Devesh Sharma of Filmfare praised the breathtaking action of the movie and gave it 3 stars. Ritika Handoo of Zee News hailed the movie as an entertaining movie which is a must-watch. Saibal Chatterjee of NDTV gave the movie two stars calling it politically dodgy in spite of being a smartly-packaged, competently shot espionage thriller. Shubha Shetty-Saha of Mid-Day gave the movie 4 stars, calling it a must-watch movie. Mihir Fadnavis of Firstpost didn't give positive reviews to the plot but praised the movie as entertaining and fast-paced. Mayank Shekhar of ABP News gave 3 stars and wrote that the film manages to hold viewers' attention. Abhishek Gupta of India TV said the film is "fast-paced and entertaining" and that it "goads by making a point that while America executed their plan to kill the 9/11 mastermind in Abbottabad, here, our politicians could just make loud promises " about the 26/11 attacks. Bollywood Hungama praised the "exceptional" cinematography; the "extremely gripping" storyline, which makes appropriate use of the actors; the score, which "instills the necessary emotions"; and Kumar's performance. It concluded, "On the whole, Baby is one of the finest films ever made in the history of Indian cinema" and gave it 4.5 out of 5 stars. R. M. Vijayakar of The New Indian Express gave 3.5 ratings calling it "that near-perfect textbook espionage thriller we have been dying to see: straight and business-like, fast-paced, without frills, and immaculately detailed to the point of occasional verbosity"

=== Ban in Pakistan ===
Baby was banned in Pakistan by the censor boards in Islamabad and Karachi, which said that "it portrays a negative image of Muslims and the negative characters in the film also have Muslim names".

== Box office ==
Bollywood Hungama estimated the opening day at ₹9.3 crore (US$970,000). International Business Times said the film had "tremendous growth" over the weekend and that its first weekend total was ₹36.07 crore (US$3.7 million).

== Spin-offs ==
A spin-off titled Naam Shabana was released on 31 March 2017. The film features Tapsee Pannu as Shabana Khan in the lead and Akshay Kumar in an extended cameo role. Neeraj Pandey is planning four more spin-offs based on different characters from the film.

== Game ==
Baby: The Game, an official game based on this film has been released by Vroovy, for Android mobile phone users.

== Awards and nominations ==
Award	Category	Recipients and nominees	Result	Ref.
8th Mirchi Music Awards	Best Background Score	Sanjoy Chowdhury	Nominated	
