= Prerna Arora =

Indian film producer, director

- Born: 8 December 1987 (age 38); Dehradun, Uttarakhand, India
- Occupations: Film producer and actor
- Known for: Film production

Prerna Arora (born 8 December 1987) is an Indian film producer and actor known for producing films including Rustom (2016) and Toilet: Ek Prem Katha (2017).

== Career ==
She gained recognition as a producer through a series of Hindi films, including Rustom (2016), Toilet: Ek Prem Katha (2017).

In 2018, she was credited as a producer in Pad Man, Pari, Fanney Khan.

== Filmography ==
=== As actor ===
| Year | Title | Role(s) | Notes |
|---|---|---|---|
| 2006 | Bhagam Bhag | Sheetal | |
| 2007 | Nanhe Jaisalmer | | |
| 2007 | Dhol | | |

=== As producer ===
| Year | Title | Type | Notes | References |
|---|---|---|---|---|
| 2016 | Rustom | Film | Producer | |
| 2017 | Toilet: Ek Prem Katha | Film | Producer | |
| 2018 | Pad Man | Film | Producer | |
| 2018 | Pari | Film | Producer | |
| 2018 | Fanney Khan | Film | Producer | |

== Legal issues ==
In 2018, Arora was booked and arrested by the Economic Offences Wing of Mumbai Police for allegedly cheating producer Vashu Bhagnani. In July 2022, she was booked again for money laundering by the Enforcement Directorate.

In 2023, the Bombay High Court pronounced the acquittal of the case against her in the Vashu Bhagnani dispute (2018).
