= Anupam Kher filmography =

Filmography

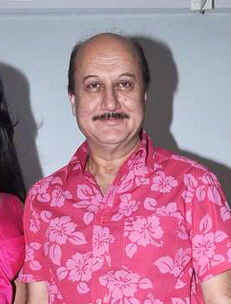
Anupam Kher From The Audio release of Mr. Bhatti On Chutti

Anupam Kher (born 7 March 1955) is an Indian actor, film producer, film director, playback singer and former chairman of Film and Television Institute of India. He is the recipient of two National Film Awards and eight Filmfare Awards. He has appeared in over 540 films in several languages and many plays. Besides working in Hindi films, he has also appeared in many acclaimed international films such as the Golden Globe nominated Bend It Like Beckham (2002), Ang Lee's Golden Lion–winning Lust, Caution (2007), and David O. Russell's Oscar-winning Silver Linings Playbook (2012).

== Hindi films ==
Key
†	Denotes films that have not yet been released

Year	Film	Role	Notes
1982	Aagaman	Bharat Bhushan	
1984	Saaransh	B. V. Pradhan	
1984	Utsav	Samsthanak's Friend	
1984	Jawaani	Surendra Malhotra	
1985	Aitbaar	Public Prosecutor	
1985	Arjun	Shivkumar Chougule	
1985	Wafadaar	Daya Sagar	
1985	Hum Naujawan	Commissioner Sajid Khan	
1985	Jaanoo	Mr. Mathur	
1985	Misaal	Rana	
1985	Rao Saheb	Rao Saheb	
1986	Aakhree Raasta	Mahesh Shandilya	
1986	Palay Khan	British General Bonz	
1986	Karma	Dr. Michael Dang	
1986	Insaaf Ki Awaaz	Kailashnath	
1986	Kala Dhanda Goray Log	Durga Das Jetia	
1986	Allah Rakha	R.S. Khera	
1986	Samundar	Rajeshwar Nath	
1986	Jeeva	Inspector Dushyant Singh	
1987	Zevar	Narendra Chowdhury	
1987	Sansar	Din Dayal Sharma	
1987	Mohre	Jagmohan Sharma	
1987	Satyamev Jayate	Advocate Amar N. Kaul	
1987	Kaash	Alok	
1987	Thikana	Inspector Anwar Ali	
1987	Uttar Dakshin	Ramniklal	
1987	Insaf Ki Pukar	Sohanlal	
1988	Mere Baad	Saagar	
1988	Ghar Mein Ram Gali Mein Shyam	Dharamchand	
1988	Tamacha	Dr. Mehta	
1988	Shiv Shakti	D.C.	
1988	Hatya	Surendra Mohan	
1988	Pestonjee	Pestonjee "Pesi"	
1988	Paap Ko Jalaa Kar Raakh Kar Doonga	Bhuchaal	
1988	Agnee	Shekhawat	
1988	Vijay	Lala Yodhraj Bhalla	
1988	Sone Pe Suhaaga	Justice Nyaychand Rastogi	
1988	Zakhmi Aurat	Lawyer Mahendranath	
1988	Tezaab	Shyamlal	
1989	Ram Lakhan	Deodhar Shastri	
1989	Bees Saal Baad	Thakur	
1989	Main Tera Dushman	Thakur Dayalu	
1989	Daddy	Anand	
1989	Taaqatwar	Municipal Officer Vijay Sharma	
1989	Nigahen: Nagina Part II	Gorakh Nath	
1989	Aakhri Ghulam	Rai Bahadur Thakur Daulat Singh	
1989	Sachai Ki Taqat	DCP Agarwal	
1989	Kasam Vardi Ki	Chaddha	
1989	Parinda	Inspector Prakash	
1989	Chandni	Ramesh Mehra	
1989	ChaalBaaz	Tribhuvan Kushwaha "Chachaji"	
1989	Tridev	Commissioner Mathur	
1989	Kanoon Apna Apna	Kabza Kanhaiyalal	
1989	Bhrashtachar	Purshottam	
1989	Zakham	Durjan	
1989	Main Azaad Hoon	Dalchand Jain	
1990	Khatarnaak	Dabariya	
1990	Awaargi	Lala Jamal Khan	
1990	Jeene Do	Hardayal	
1990	Izzatdaar	Jailor Mushtaque Ali	
1990	Kroadh	Inspector Vikram Shukla	
1990	Kanoon Ki Zanjeer	Indeevar Srivastava	
1990	Jamai Raja	Dindayal Trivedi	
1990	Muqaddar Ka Badshaah	Vijay Singh	
1990	Dil	Hazari Prasad	
1990	Sheshnaag	Bansi Lal	
1990	Aaj Ka Arjun	Police Inspector	
1991	Khilaaf	Rana Ranjit Singh Sangwan	
1991	Mast Kalandar	Pinkoo	
1991	Ayee Milan Ki Raat	Bajrangi / Sumer Singh / Baldev Singh	
1991	Pratigyabadh	Tej Bahadur / Tejaa	
1991	Pyar Hua Chori Chori	Jhunjhunwala	
1991	Haque	Bittu Singh	
1991	Deshwasi	Raja Shamsher Singh	
1991	Trinetra	Father Patrick	
1991	Saudagar	Mandhaari Kaka	
1991	Saathi	Inspector Kotwal / Sultan	
1991	Lamhe	Prem Anand	
1991	Hum	Inspector Girdhar	
1991	Dil Hai Ki Manta Nahin	Seth Dharamchand	
1991	Ganga Jamuna Ki Lalkar	Lala	
1991	Sau Crore	Mohanbhai	
1992	Vansh	Krishnakant Dharmadhikari	
1992	Aasmaan Se Gira	Mad person at the sanitarium	
1992	Beta	Totaram Chautala	
1992	Do Hanso Ka Joda	N/A	
1992	Zindagi Ek Juaa	Jagjit "J.J." Singh	
1992	Heer Ranjha	Kaedo	
1992	Shola Aur Shabnam	Major Inder Mohan Lathi	
1992	Nagin Aur Lootere	Police Constable	
1992	Humlaa	Jagtap	
1992	Ek Ladka Ek Ladki	Bhagwati Prasad	
1992	Ganga Bani Shola	Chamanlal	
1992	Khel	Seema's Uncle	
1992	Apradhi	Heera	
1992	Umar 55 Ki Dil Bachpan Ka	Batliwala	
1993	Shreemaan Aashique	Professor Vishwamitra	
1993	Aaj Kie Aurat	Editor Arun Saxena	
1993	Lootere	Changez Lala	
1993	Roop Ki Rani Choron Ka Raja	Jagmohan "Jugran" Laal / Manmohan Laal (Note: Kher played two characters.)	
1993	Dil Ki Baazi	Daulatram	
1993	Parampara	Gora Shankar	
1993	Kayda Kanoon	Mr. Sinha	
1993	Waqt Hamara Hai	Dinanath Sabkuchwala	
1993	Meherbaan	Shankar	
1993	Khalnayak	Ishwar Pandey	
1993	Izzat Ki Roti	Girdharilal Chakradhari	
1993	Sainik	Retd. Colonel Yashpal Dutt	
1993	Hum Hain Kamaal Ke	Nilamber	
1993	Gumrah	Prakash Chadda	
1993	Dil Tera Aashiq	Ranvir Chaudhari	
1993	Aasoo Bane Angaarey	Shyamsunder	
1993	Tadipaar	Kader	
1993	Darr	Vijay Awasthi	
1994	Karan	Seth Pawan Puri	
1994	Insaniyat	Brijbhan	
1994	Laadla	Laxmi Narayan Jaitley	
1994	1942: A Love Story	Raghuvir Pathak	
1994	Maha Shaktishaali	Inspector Prakash Varma	
1994	Pyar Ka Rog	Col. Udham "Udhu" Singh	
1994	Eena Meena Deeka	Ujwal Raja Bully	
1994	Hum Aapke Hain Koun..!	Prof. Siddharth Chaudhary	
1994	Saajan Ka Ghar	Mr. Dhanraj	
1994	Chaand Kaa Tukdaa	Hasmukh Khurana	
1995	Dil Ka Doctor	Doctor Dilbag	
1995	Meri Mohabbat Mera Naseeba	Abdullah Chacha	
1995	Taqdeerwala	Inspector Ranjit Singh	
1995	Janam Kundli	Mahendra Prasad	
1995	Zamana Deewana	Kamdev Singh "KD"	
1995	Oh Darling! Yeh Hai India!	President / Nathuram	
1995	Dilwale Dulhania Le Jayenge	Dharamvir Malhotra	
1995	Ram Shastra	Dhonga	
1996	Vishwasghaat	Indramohan Saxena / Professor Khurana	
1996	Dushmani	Mr. Oberoi	
1996	Shastra	Shanti Prasad	
1996	Tu Chor Main Sipahi	Police Commissioner Kushal Singh	
1996	Papa Kehte Hai	Krishan Anand	
1996	Shohrat	Sadanand Saigal	
1996	Uff Yeh Mohabbat	Tej Singh	
1996	Prem Granth	Swami Dharam Bhooshan	
1996	Chaahat	Shambunath Rathore	
1996	Maahir	Balwant Rai	
1996	Mr. Bechara	Dr. Dayanand	
1997	Judwaa	Inspector Vidyarthi	
1997	Agnichakra	Dhanraj	
1997	Gudgudee	Ajay Prasad	
1997	Ziddi	Advocate Ashok Pradhan	
1997	Sanam	Seth Yashpal Anand	
1997	Aur Pyaar Ho Gaya	Kailashnath	
1997	Deewana Mastana	Brijbhan "Birju" Rastogi	
1997	Mere Sapno Ki Rani	Lakhan Nehle	
1997	Afltaoon	Vidyaprakash	
1997	Share Bazaar	Inspector Sharma	
1998	Zor	Police Commissioner Uday Singh	
1998	Saat Rang Ke Sapne	Bhanu	
1998	Hazaar Chaurasi Ki Maa	Dibyanath Chatterjee	
1998	Keemat	Dinanath Tripathi	
1998	Salaakhen	Sachidanand Agnihotri	
1998	Aunty No. 1	Jyotish	
1998	Swami Vivekananda	Station Master	Cameo
1998	Jab Pyaar Kisise Hota Hai	Dadaji	
1998	Kuch Kuch Hota Hai	Principal Malhotra	
1998	Prem Aggan	Jai Kumar	
1998	Bade Miyan Chote Miyan	Police Commissioner Shyamlal Tripathi	
1998	Doli Saja Ke Rakhna	Mr. Bansal	
1998	China Gate	Brigadier Anoop Kumar / Governor	cameo
1998	Jhooth Bole Kauwa Kaate	Rashid Khan	
1999	Sarfarosh-E-Hind	DCP Arun Bedi	
1999	Hum Aapke Dil Mein Rehte Hain	Mr. Vishwanath	
1999	Sooryavansham	Dharmendra	
1999	Haseena Maan Jaayegi	Gulzarilal Verma	
2000	Kaho Naa... Pyaar Hai	Vishal "Sirjee" Saxena	
2000	Dulhan Hum Le Jayenge	Vicky Nath	
2000	Dil Hi Dil Mein	Colonel Enayathulla	
2000	Kya Kehna	Gulshan Bakshi	
2000	Refugee	Jaan Mohammad	
2000	Dhadkan	Digvijay Varma	cameo
2000	Hamara Dil Aapke Paas Hai	Muthu Pillai	
2000	Aaghaaz	Balraj Nanda	
2000	Mohabbatein	Kake	
2000	Ghaath	Ramakant Patel	
2000	Dhai Akshar Prem Ke	Raunaq Grewal	
2001	Aashiq	Dilip Dev Kapoor	
2001	Jodi No.1	Rai Bahadur	
2001	Kyo Kii... Main Jhuth Nahin Bolta	Advocate Tejpal Singh	
2001	Rehnaa Hai Terre Dil Mein	Deendayal "DD" Shastri	
2002	Koi Mere Dil Se Poochhe	Mr. Puri	
2002	Yeh Hai Jalwa	Robin Singh	
2003	Jaal: The Trap	R. K. Sharma / Captain Rashid	
2004	Meri Biwi Ka Jawaab Nahin	Bhairav Chaudhary	
2004	Garv	Lawyer Tyagi	
2004	Shart: The Challenge	Dr. Mathur	
2004	Tumsa Nahin Dekha	John Uncle	
2004	Shukriya: Till Death Do Us Apart	Karam Jindal	
2004	Kaun Hai Jo Sapno Mein Aaya	Dr. Verma	
2004	Veer-Zaara	Zakir Ahmed	
2004	Aabra Ka Daabra	Limbu	
2005	Hum Jo Keh Na Paaye	Neeraj Mehta	
2005	Kyaa Kool Hai Hum	Dr. Screwala	
2005	Maine Gandhi Ko Nahin Mara	Professor Uttam Chaudhary	
2005	Sarkar	Motilal Khurana	
2005	Main Aisa Hi Hoon	Dayanath Trivedi	
2005	Paheli	Bhanwarlal	
2006	Rang De Basanti	Rajnath Singhania	
2006	Umar	Narrator	
2006	Shaadi Se Pehle	Mangal Pratap Bhalla	
2006	Aap Ki Khatir	Arjun Khanna	
2006	Chup Chup Ke	Jaived Prasad	
2006	Khosla Ka Ghosla	Kamal Kishore Khosla	
2006	Jaan-E-Mann	Boney Chachu / New York Cafe Owner	
2006	Vivah	Harishchandra Bajpayee	
2006	Apna Sapna Money Money	Satyabol Shastri	
2006	Prateeksha	James Brown	
2007	Shakalaka Boom Boom	Reggie's Father	
2007	Buddha Mar Gaya	Laxmikant "LK" Kabadiya	
2007	Heyy Babyy	Mr. Malhotra	Cameo
2007	Dhokha	Saeed	
2007	Laaga Chunari Mein Daag	Shivshankar Sahay	
2007	Apna Asmaan	Dr. Sathya	
2007	Victoria No. 203	Raja	
2007	Gauri: The Unborn	Papa	
2007	Dus Kahaniyaan	Anya's Dad	Segment: Lovedale
2007	Jaane Bhi Do Yaaron	Lama	
2008	My Name Is Anthony Gonsalves	Murtaza Seth	
2008	Dhoom Dadakka	Mungilal	
2008	Rama Rama Kya Hai Drama	Vishwas Khurana	
2008	C Kkompany	Mr. Joshi	
2008	A Wednesday!	Prakash Rathod	
2008	Tahaan	Subhan Darr	
2008	De Taali	Abhi's Father	
2008	God Tussi Great Ho	Jagmohan Prajapati	
2008	Meerabai Not Out	Dr. Awasthi	
2009	Victory	Ram Shekhawat	
2009	Morning Walk	Joymohan	
2009	Zamaanat	Dr. Madan	
2009	Sankat City	Faujdar	
2009	Life Partner	Mr. Suraj Jugran	
2009	Yeh Mera India	Judge Ayyar	
2009	Dil Bole Hadippa!	Vikram "Vicky" Singh	
2009	Wake Up Sid	Ram Mehra	
2009	Teree Sang	Judge	
2010	Pyaar Impossible	Mr. Udesh Sharma	
2010	Striker	Inspector Farooque	
2010	Apartment	Madhusudan Tanha	
2010	Badmaash Company	Sajjan Kapoor	
2010	Lamhaa	Haji	
2010	Dabangg	Dayal Babu	
2011	Yamla Pagla Deewana	Joginder Singh Brar	
2011	Game	Kabir Malhotra / Iqbal Chand Malhotra	
2011	Zokkomon	Deshraj / Dr. Vivek Roy	
2011	Naughty @ 40	Laxminarayan Srivastav	
2011	Chatur Singh Two Star	Commissioner Rajpal Sinha / Dr. Jhatka	
2011	Yeh Faasley	Devinder Devilal Dua	
2011	Mausam	Maharaj Kishan	
2011	Desi Boyz	Suresh Awasthi	
2011	Aagaah: The Warning	Pir Baba	
2012	Chaar Din Ki Chandni	Chandraveer Singh	
2012	Kyaa Super Kool Hain Hum	Francis Marlo	
2012	Mr. Bhatti on Chutti	BB Bhatti	
2012	Chhodo Kal Ki Baatein	Benam Kumar	
2012	Krishna Aur Kans	Gargacharya	Voiceover
2012	Midnight's Children	Ghani	
2012	Jab Tak Hai Jaan	Kamal Thapar	Cameo
2013	Mai	Doctor	
2013	Special 26	Prem Kant Sharma	
2013	Chashme Baddoor	Suryakant / Chandrakant	
2013	Aurangzeb	Inspector Vijaykant Phogat	Cameo
2013	Hum Hain Raahi Car Ke	Prof. Ganguly	
2013	Yamla Pagla Deewana 2	Joginder Armstrong	
2013	Gori Tere Pyaar Mein	Latesh Bhai	
2013	Mahabharat	Shakuni	Voiceover
2014	Total Siyapaa	Rajinder Singh	
2014	Gang of Ghosts	Gendamal	
2014	Main Tera Hero	Vikrant Singhal	
2014	Singham Returns	Gurukant "Guruji" Acharya	
2014	Daawat-e-Ishq	Abdul Qadir / Shahriyar Habibullah	
2014	Ekkees Toppon Ki Salaami	Purushotam Narayan Joshi	
2014	Happy New Year	Manohar Sharma	Cameo
2014	Super Nani	Mr. Sammy	
2014	The Shaukeens	Ashok "Lali" Lalwani	
2014	Sonali Cable	Boss-Waghela	
2015	Baby	Om Prakash Shukla	
2015	Sharafat Gayi Tel Lene	D.K. Thawani	
2015	Roy	Mr. Grewal	Cameo
2015	Dirty Politics	C.B.I. Chief Satya Prakash Mishra	
2015	Prem Ratan Dhan Payo	Jagdish "Bapu" Diwan	
2016	Buddha In A Traffic Jam	Professor Ranjan Batki	
2016	M.S. Dhoni: The Untold Story	Paan Singh Dhoni	
2016	Saat Uchakkey	Diwan	
2017	Naam Shabana	Om Prakash Shukla	Cameo
2017	Indu Sarkar	Nana Pradhan	
2017	Toilet: Ek Prem Katha	Dinanath "DJ Kakka" Joshi	
2017	Judwaa 2	Balraj Bakshi	
2017	Ranchi Diaries	Thakur Bhaiyaa	
2018	Aiyaary	Tariq Ali	
2018	Baa Baaa Black Sheep	Charudutt "Charlie" Sharma	
2018	Love Sonia	Dada Thakur	
2019	The Accidental Prime Minister	Manmohan Singh	
2019	One Day: Justice Delivered	Retired Justice Omprakash Tyagi	
2021	Happy Birthday	Ratanshi Oshidaar	short
2022	The Kashmir Files	Pushkar Nath Pandit	
2022	Uunchai	Om Sharma	
2023	Shiv Shastri Balboa	Shiv Shankar Shastri	
2023	IB71	IB Chief N. S. Avasti	
2023	The Vaccine War	Cabinet Secretary	
2024	Kuch Khattaa Ho Jaay	Heer's Grandfather	
2024	Kaagaz 2	Raj Narayan Singh	
2024	Chhota Bheem and the Curse of Damyaan	Guru Shambhu	
2024	The Signature	Arvind	
2024	Vijay 69	Vijay Matthews	
2025	Emergency	Jay Prakash Narayan	
2025	Tumko Meri Kasam	Dr. Abhimanyu Murdia	
2025	Metro... In Dino	Parimal Sarkar	
2025	Tanvi the Great	Colonel Pratap Raina	
2026	Ramayana: Part 1	Jatayu	Voice-over
2026	Yeh Prem Mol Liya †	TBA	
2026	Khosla Ka Ghosla 2 †	Kamal Kishore Khosla	

== Other language films ==
Year	Title	Role	Language	Notes
1987	Trimurtulu	Don	Telugu	
1990	Nehru: The Jewel of India	Jawahar	English	
1990	Indrajaalam	CM Of Maharashtra	Malayalam	
1996	Nayudu Gari Kutumbam	Antony	Telugu	
1997	V.I.P.	Priya's Father	Tamil	
1998	Swami Vivekananda	Station Master	English	Cameo
2001	Little John	Swami Paramananda	English; Tamil	
2001	Praja	Bappu Haji Mustafa	Malayalam	
2002	Bend It Like Beckham	Mr. Bhamra	English	
2003	Banana Brothers	Ketan	English	
2004	Bride & Prejudice	Mr. Bakshi	English	
2005	The Mistress of Spices	Geeta's grandfather	English	
2006	American Blend	Raj Chadha	English	
2006	Hope & A Little Sugar	Colonel Oberoi	English	
2007	Kuttrapathirikai	Rajiv Gandhi	Tamil	
2007	Lust, Caution	Khalid Said ud-Din	Chinese	
2007	Gandhi Park	Sammy Philips	English	
2008	The Other End Of The Line	Rajeev Sethi	English	
2009	Tera Mera Ki Rishta	Mohinder	Punjabi	
2010	You Will Meet A Tall Dark Stranger	Dia's Father	English	
2011	Pranayam	Achuthan Nair	Malayalam	
2011	The Lion of Judah	Monty	English	
2011	Breakaway	Darvesh Singh	English	
2012	Mudhalvar Mahatma	Chief Minister	Tamil	
2012	Parijatha	N/A	Kannada	
2012	Silver Linings Playbook	Dr. Cliff Patel	English	
2012	Midnight's Children	Ghani	English	
2013	Kashala Udyachi Baat	Blind Man	Marathi	
2014	Nayana	Nayana's Muttachan	Malayalam	
2014	Kalimannu	Himself	Malayalam	Guest appearance
2014	Shongram	Old Karim	English; Bengali	
2016	A Family Man	Dr. Savraj Singh	English	
2017	The Big Sick	Azmat Nanjiani	English	
2017	The Boy With The Topknot	Shathnam's Father	English	
2018	Hotel Mumbai	Hemant Oberoi	English	
2022	Karthikeya 2	Dr. Dhanvanthri Vedpathak	Telugu	Cameo
2022	Connect	Father Augustine	Tamil	
2023	Voice Of Sathyanathan	President Of India	Malayalam	
2023	Tiger Nageswara Rao	IB Officer Raghavendra Rajput	Telugu	
2023	Ghost	A. N. Rao	Kannada	
2025	Hari Hara Veera Mallu	Dinesh	Telugu	
2025	Calorie	Mohan	English, Punjabi	
TBA	The India House †	Shyamji Krishna Varma	Telugu	

== Other credits ==
=== As director, producer, and writer ===
Year	Film	Director	Producer	Writer	Notes
2000	Bariwali		Yes		
2005	Maine Gandhi Ko Nahin Mara		Yes		
2009	Tere Sang		Yes		
2017	Ranchi Diaries		Yes		
2025	Tanvi The Great	Yes	Yes	Yes	

=== Dubbing roles ===
Film title	Original Voice	Character	Dub Language	Original Language	Original Year Release	Dub Year Release	Notes
Up	Ed Asner	Carl Fredricksen	Hindi	English	2009	2009	

== Television ==
Year	Show	Role	Notes
1985	Janam	Virendra Desai	Television film
1995	Imtihaan	—N/a	Producer
2000–2004	Say Na Something To Anupam Uncle	Host	
2001	Sawaal Dus Crore Ka	Host	
2004	ER	Ajay Rasgotra	
2004	Spooks	Harakat	
2007–2008	Lead India	Host	
2013	24	Wasim Khan	Cameo
2014–2015	The Anupam Kher Show - Kucch Bhi Ho Sakta Hai	Host	
2015–2018	Sense8	Sanyam Dandekar	
2016	Bharatvarsh	Host	
2017	People	Host	
2017	The Indian Detective	Stanley D'Mello	
2018	Mrs Wilson	Shahbaz Karim	
2018–2021	New Amsterdam	Dr. Vijay Kapoor	
2021	Bhuj: The Day India Shook	Narrator	Documentary
2022	Naam Tha Kanhaiyalal	Himself	Documentary
2023	Trial By Fire	Captain Hardeep Bedi	
2023	The Freelancer	Dr. Arif Khan	
