= List of awards and nominations received by Anupam Kher =

Anupam Kher awards and nominations
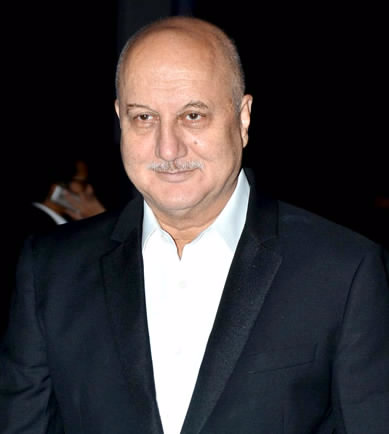
- Kher in 2014
Awards and nominations
Award	Wins	Nominations
Filmfare Awards	8	15
National Film Awards	2	2
IIFA Awards	2	5
Screen Awards	2	4
Global Indian Film Awards	1	1
SAG Awards	0	2
British Academy of Film and Television Awards	0	1
Other awards	6	8
Honours	10	0

Totals (Note: Certain award groups do not simply award one winner. They acknowledge several different recipients, have runners-up, and have third place. Since this is a specific recognition and is different from losing an award, runner-up mentions are considered wins in this award tally. For simplification and to avoid errors, each award in this list has been presumed to have had a prior nomination.)
- Wins: 31
- Nominations: 48

Anupam Kher is an Indian actor and the former chairman of Film and Television Institute of India. He is the recipient of two National Film Awards and eight Filmfare Awards. He has appeared in over 500 films in several languages and many plays. He won the Filmfare Award for Best Actor for his performance in Saaransh (1984). He holds the record for winning the Filmfare Award for Best Comedian five times in total for: Ram Lakhan (1989), Lamhe (1991), Khel (1992), Darr (1993) and Dilwale Dulhaniya Le Jayenge (1995). He won the National Film Award for Special Mention twice for his performances in Daddy (1989) and Maine Gandhi Ko Nahin Mara (2005). For his performance in the film Vijay (1988), he won the Filmfare Award for Best Supporting Actor.

Besides working in Hindi films, he has also appeared in many acclaimed international films such as the Golden Globe nominated Bend It Like Beckham (2002), Ang Lee's Golden Lion–winning Lust, Caution (2007), and David O. Russell's Oscar-winning Silver Linings Playbook (2013). He received a BAFTA nomination for his supporting role in the British television sitcom The Boy With The Topknot (2018).

He has held the post of chairman of the Central Board of Film Certification and the National School of Drama in India. The Government of India honoured him with the Padma Shri in 2004 and the Padma Bhushan in 2016 for his contribution in the field of cinema and arts.

== Civilian awards ==
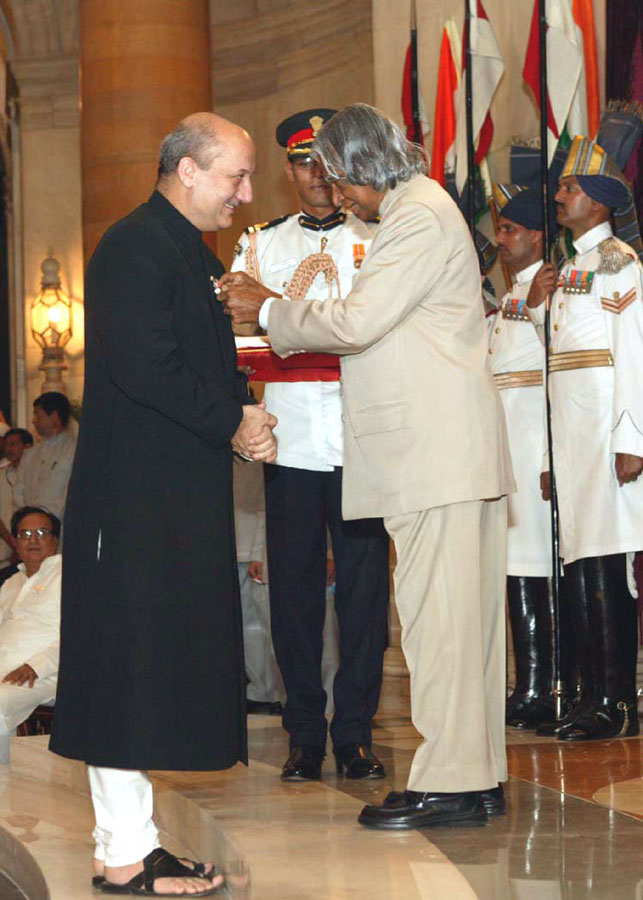
Kher receiving Padma Shri Award from the President Dr. Abdul Kalam.

- 2004: Padma Shri by the Government of India for his contribution to Indian cinema
- 2016: Padma Bhushan by the Government of India for his contribution to the arts

== National Film Awards ==
Year	Film	Category	Result	Ref.
1990	Daddy	Special Jury Award	Won	
2005	Maine Gandhi Ko Nahin Mara	Special Jury Award	Won	

== Filmfare Awards ==
Year	Film	Category	Result	Ref.
1984	Saaransh	Best Actor	Won	
1986	Janam	Best Supporting Actor	Nominated	
1988	Vijay	Best Supporting Actor	Won	
1989	Ram Lakhan	Best Comedian	Won	
1990	Dil	Best Supporting Actor	Nominated	
1990	Daddy	Best Actor (Critics)	Won	
1991	Saudagar	Best Supporting Actor	Nominated	
1991	Lamhe	Best Supporting Actor	Nominated	
1991	Lamhe	Best Comedian	Won	
1991	Dil Hai Ke Manta Nahin	Best Comedian	Nominated	
1992	Khel	Best Comedian	Won	
1992	Shola Aur Shabnam	Best Comedian	Nominated	
1993	Darr	Best Comedian	Won	
1993	Shreemaan Aashique	Best Comedian	Nominated	
1993	Waqt Hamara Hai	Best Comedian	Nominated	
1994	Hum Aapke Hain Koun..!	Best Supporting Actor	Nominated	
1995	Dilwale Dulhaniya Le Jayenge	Best Comedian	Won	
1997	Chaahat	Best Supporting Actor	Nominated	
1998	Kuch Kuch Hota Hai	Best Comedian	Nominated	
2000	Dulhan Hum Le Jayenge	Best Comedian	Nominated	
2013	Special 26	Best Supporting Actor	Nominated	
2023	Uunchai	Best Supporting Actor	Nominated	
2023	The Kashmir Files	Best Actor	Nominated	

== British Academy Television Awards ==
Year	Film	Category	Result	Ref.
2018	The Boy With The Topknot	Best Supporting Actor	Nominated	

=== Screen Actors Guild Awards ===
Year	Film	Category	Result	Ref.
2013	Silver Linings Playbook	Outstanding Performance by a Cast in a Motion Picture	Nominated	
2018	The Big Sick	Outstanding Performance by a Cast in a Motion Picture	Nominated	

== International Indian Film Academy Awards ==
Year	Film	Category	Result	Ref.
2001	Mohabbatein	Best Performance in a Comic Role	Nominated	
2001	Kya Kehna	Best Supporting Actor	Nominated	
2014	Special 26	Best Supporting Actor	Nominated	
2017	M.S. Dhoni: The Untold Story	Best Supporting Actor	Won	
2018	Outstanding Achievement in Indian Cinema		Won	

== Screen Awards India ==
Year	Film	Category	Result	Ref.
1994	1942: A Love Story	Best Supporting Actor	Won	
1999	Haseena Maan Jayegi	Best Comedian	Won	
2009	A Wednesday	Best Supporting Actor	Nominated	
2017	M.S. Dhoni: The Untold Story	Best Supporting Actor	Nominated	

== Miscellaneous awards ==
Year	Film	Award	Category	Result	Ref.
2005	Maine Gandhi Ko Nahin Mara	Karachi International Film Festival	Best Actor	Won	
2006	Maine Gandhi Ko Nahin Mara	Riverside International Film Festival at California	Best Actor	Won	
2006	Khosla Ka Ghosla	Global Indian Film Awards	Best Comedian	Won	
2010	Wake Up Sid	Producers Guild Film Awards	Best Supporting Actor	Nominated	
2012	Silver Linings Playbook	Gotham Independent Film Award	Best Ensemble Cast	Nominated	
2012	Silver Linings Playbook	Critics' Choice Awards	Best Acting Ensemble	Won	
2012	Silver Linings Playbook	Detroit Film Critics Society	Best Ensemble Cast	Nominated	
2023	The Kashmir Files	Zee Cine Awards	Best Actor (Male)	Won	

== Other awards ==
- 2005: "Divya Himachal Award" for excellence
- 2013: Outstanding Achievement in Cinema award at The Asian Awards
- 2015: Kalakar Award for Actor of the Year in Kolkata
- 2025: Raj Kapoor Award

== Recognitions ==
- He was honoured by Walk of the Stars as his hand print was preserved for posterity at Bandra Bandstand in Mumbai.
- He was presented with the "Honoured Guest" award by the US state of Texas for his contribution to cinema and art.
