= Ghalib Danger =

2013 novel by Neeraj Pandey

- Book cover
- Author: Neeraj Pandey
- Cover artist: Mohsin Rizvi
- Language: English
- Genre: Crime, Thriller
- Publisher: Penguin Books (India)
- Publication date: 6 December 2013
- Publication place: India
- Media type: eBook and Paperback)
- Pages: 255 pp (Paperback Edition)
- ISBN: 978-0-143-42101-6 (First edition)

Ghalib Danger is a 2013 novel by Neeraj Pandey, who is best known for writing and directing the films A Wednesday! and Special 26.

== Plot summary ==
Ghalib Danger revolves around the life of its main protagonist Kamran Ali, a young taxi driver in Mumbai who dreams of bigger things for himself. After he saves the life of notorious underworld don Mirza, he is taken under Mirza's tutelage and gets drawn into the mafia world. Kamran eventually takes over Mirza's throne, but holds on to Mirza’s philosophy that Ghalib’s poetry can solve any problem. Soon, Kamran becomes the city’s most feared don with even the cops and politicians fearing him, earning him the name Ghalib Danger.

== Main characters ==
- Kamran Ali as Ghalib Danger
- Mirza as Underworld Don and Kamran’s Mentor

== Publication and release ==
Ghalib Danger was released on 6 December 2013 at the Times of India Literary Carnival in at Mehboob Studio, Bandra, Mumbai. The book was launched by actor Anupam Kher in an event attended by actors Shriya Saran, Divya Dutta, Manoj Bajpayee and Anup Soni. Hussain Zaidi, author of Dongri to Dubai and Black Friday and the co-founder of Blue Salt was also present at the event.

The Hindi version of the book was released in 2018.
