= 1987 Opera House heist =

Theft of jewels in Bombay, India

- Date: 19 March 1987
- Time: 2:15 pm IST
- Location: Tribhovandas Bhimji Zaveri & Sons Jewellers, Opera House, Bombay, India; 18°55′30″N 72°49′11″E
- Also known as: TBZ Opera House robbery
- Outcome: Jewellery and cash worth ₹ 2.3 to 3.5 million stolen

On 19 March 1987, a group posing as Central Bureau of Investigation officers executed a fake raid on the Opera House branch of Tribhovandas Bhimji Zaveri & Sons Jewellers in Bombay (present-day Mumbai), Maharashtra, India. The raid was led by an unknown man who had assembled the group by inviting the candidates for fake recruitment interview. The unknown man disappeared with the spoils of the raid. The case remains unsolved.

== Heist ==
The person posing as Mon Singh or Mohan Singh had placed a classified advertisement in the 17 March 1987 issue of The Times of India, asking for "Dynamic Graduates for Intelligence Officers Post and Security Officers Post". Applicants were told to report to the hotel Taj Intercontinental between 10 am and 5 pm the next day. He rented an office at Mittal Towers in Nariman Point to interview the candidates. Singh selected at least 26 candidates and asked them to report to the Taj the following day and were briefed about the 'mock raid' by Singh.

On 19 March, they arrived at the Opera House branch of Tribhovandas Bhimji Zaveri & Sons Jewellers around 2:15 pm. Singh introduced himself to the owner, Pratap Zaveri, and produced a 'search warrant'. He ordered the owners to turn off CCTV cameras and surrender a licensed revolver held on the premises. Singh and the fake contingent of Central Bureau of Investigation (CBI) officers did not allow any phone calls and took samples of ornaments for assessment of the quality of the gold. Singh picked 'samples' of jewellery and had them sealed in polybags. Cash was also collected. After 45 minutes Singh asked two men to put the briefcases in the bus. He asked others to keep watch on the shop and left in the bus to 'supervise' another raid. After about an hour, the owners called the Bombay Police.

== Investigation ==
Police investigation revealed that Singh booked room number 415 at the Taj on 17 March and he put an advertisement in the newspaper. Police found that he reached the hotel after leaving the jewellery shop and hired a taxi from there. The taxi dropped him at Vile Parle where he hired an auto. He was last seen there and there was no trail. The police put out a nationwide alert. They sent a team to Kerala as his hotel record showed that he hailed from Trivandrum. A person named George Augustine Fernandes was arrested there but it was later found that he was not involved. They also sent a team to Dubai but no headway was reported.

According to a 1987 report, the cash of ₹3.75 lakh (US$3,900) and the jewellery worth about ₹20 lakh (US$21,000) was looted. Other reports place the heist amount ranging from ₹30 lakh to ₹35 lakh (equivalent to ₹4.8 crore or US$500,000 in 2026). The case remains unsolved.

A year before, in October 1986, a similar advertisement was published in The Times of India and about 150 candidates had appeared at the hotel Taj for interview. The CBI had received the tip but the interviewer did not appear. The event was considered as a "dress rehearsal".

== Popular culture ==
- Kalikkalam - A 1990 Malayalam film that had an inspired heist sequence in a jewellery store introducing the lead character played by Mammootty .
- Khel - A 1992 Hindi film had a small heist sequence inspired by this incident.
- Special 26 - A 2013 Hindi film, directed by Neeraj Pandey, is based on the heist. It was remade in 2018 Tamil film Thaanaa Serndha Koottam.
- The Sialkot Saga - A book by Ashwin Sanghi has referenced the heist.
