= Anubhava =

- Directed by: Kashinath
- Written by: Kashinath
- Produced by: G Sathyanarayana; G Kashinath; G Datthathreya; G Doddayya; G Umapathi
- Starring: Kashinath; Abhinaya; Umashree
- Cinematography: K. Sundarnath Suvarna
- Edited by: A. Subramanyam
- Music by: L. Vaidyanathan
- Production company: Sri Gayatri Productions
- Release date: 1984
- Running time: 150 minutes
- Country: India
- Language: Kannada

Anubhava ( transl. Experience) is a 1984 Indian Kannada-language drama film starring Kashinath, Abhinaya and Umashree. Actresses Abhinaya and Umashree made their debut with this film. The film is directed, co-produced and written by Kashinath and produced under Sri Gayatri Productions banner. It was remade in Hindi twice - first in 1986 as Anubhav starring Shekhar Suman, Richa Sharma and Padmini Kolhapure directed by Kashinath himself and second as Chadti Jawaani. The film was dubbed in Malayalam as Aadhyate Anubhavam and in Telugu as Anubhavam. Sunil Kumar Desai worked as an assistant to Kashinath on this movie.

The film ran into censor issues but was a box office success. The film was re-released on 29 November 2013 to cater to the modern audience making it a third-time release.

== Plot ==
Ramesh is doing his routine job in Bangalore. In his native village, his aunt lives with her children Gauri and Gunda. When Gauri attains puberty, her mother thinks of getting her married to Ramesh and writes a letter communicating the same though the village Sheregar. On hearing this, Ramesh starts daydreaming about his cousin and soon to be wife Gauri. He also tries to educate himself by trying to buy some adult books. Gauri however is still very immature and continues her playful acts like any oblivious kids in her village. Ramesh travels to the village to prepare for the marriage and tries to woe Gauri without much success. He is however eyed by another village belle Padhi who dreams of using Ramesh as her ticket to the city. After the marriage, Ramesh is lovelorn and not able to consummate as Gauri runs away from him. This frustrates Ramesh and with time he walks out into the arms of waiting Padhi. They begin a lusty affair and Ramesh ignores his wife completely. He even goes back to the city with Padhi without the knowledge of his family promising his wife to get her as soon as he finds a suitable home. Once back in the city, they start living as husband and wife. However, hypergamous Padhi loses interest in Ramesh and eyes the men around. She falls into a trap by a man who is into prostitution selling women to far Mumbai. When Ramesh finds out about Padhi's treachery he is angry but feels helpless. He gets worried about his future when police start making enquiry about Padhi and the man with whom she was seen. Back in the village his aunt along with his wife travel to Bangalore when they find that their letters were unanswered. They cannot track him in spite of visiting his work place as he has resigned. Dejected they travel back to their village. When they enter home, they find that Ramesh is back in their home to make a new beginning. Ramesh apologizes to his wife and they embrace each other in love.

== Cast ==
- Kashinath as Ramesh
- Abhinaya as Gauri
- Umashree as Paddi
- Master Vasantha
- Aravind
- Dinesh
- Kaminidharan
- Shivaraj
- Shivakumar

== Production ==
Umashree was selected to portray the role "with grey shades" as no actresses were willing to portray this role.

== Soundtrack ==
All the songs are composed and scored by L. Vaidyanathan. V. Manohar, who went on to become a successful music director in Kannada cinema started his career as a lyricist with this film.

Song	Singer
"Kaamana Dumbiya"	S. P. Balasubrahmanyam, Vani Jairam
"Hodeya Doora"	Vani Jairam

All lyrics are written by Poovachal Khader.

Malayalam tracklist
No.	Title	Singer(s)	Length
1.	"Kaamanorambinu"	Krishnachandran
2.	"Povukayo Nee"	Vani Jayaram

== Release ==
The film was released in 1984 and later re-released on 29 November 2013 across Karnataka state cinema halls. The film met with positive response at the box office and ran for 37 weeks at the now closed Kailash theatre in Bengaluru.

== Awards ==
- 1983 - 84 – Karnataka State Film Awards
1. Best Actress – Abhinaya
2. Best Supporting Actor - Aravind
3. Best Supporting Actress - Kaminidharan
