= Thaanaa Serndha Koottam =

2018 Indian Tamil crime comedy film

- Theatrical release poster
- Directed by: Vignesh Shivan
- Based on: Special 26 by Neeraj Pandey
- Produced by: K. E. Gnanavel Raja
- Starring: Suriya; Karthik; Ramya Krishnan; Keerthy Suresh
- Cinematography: Dinesh B. Krishnan
- Edited by: A. Sreekar Prasad
- Music by: Anirudh Ravichander
- Production company: Studio Green
- Distributed by: Bharathan Films
- Release date: 12 January 2018
- Running time: 138 minutes
- Country: India
- Language: Tamil
- Box office: est. ₹90 crore

Thaanaa Serndha Koottam (transl. A Crowd That Gathered on Its Own) is a 2018 Indian Tamil-language crime comedy film directed by Vignesh Shivan. The film stars Suriya in the main lead role, alongside Karthik, Ramya Krishnan, Keerthy Suresh, Nandha, Kalaiyarasan, RJ Balaji, and Suresh Chandra Menon. The film's music was composed by Anirudh Ravichander and the cinematography was performed by Dinesh B. Krishnan and edited by A. Sreekar Prasad. It is a remake of the 2013 Hindi film Special 26, which was inspired by the 1987 Opera House heist in Mumbai.

Principal photography commenced in November 2016 and ended in August 2017. Thaana Serndha Kootam had a worldwide theatrical release on 12 January 2018. It received generally positive reviews from critics and the audience with praise for the performances of the cast (especially Suriya and Karthik), writing, direction, screenplay, social message, background score, and soundtrack.

== Plot ==
All the events in this movie happen in the period of 1986–1987. The film begins with Pallavaram Paranjothi Pandian attending an interview for a clerk's post and getting rejected due to a lack of money for giving bribes to the officials.

Now the story shifts to Nachinarkiniyan, aka Iniyan, attending CBI interviews and his friend attending police interviews. Both were rejected due to a lack of bribe money for the post. Iniyan's father, Porchelvan, works as a CBI office clerk. He wants his son to be an officer; hence, he pleads for his son's posting to his higher officials.

However, he earned the wrath of his senior official officer, Uthaman, a corrupt official. Once during a raid, he asks for money. Porchelvan did not approve of this and complained about Uthaman in the form of an anonymous letter. Uthaman learns of this and exacts revenge by purposely rejecting and humiliating Iniyan at the interview and later asking him to bribe in order to get the job. Iniyan and his father are dejected, and Iniyan's friend is dejected due to his failure in the interview, and he later commits suicide.

Iniyan is depressed after all these events and decides to loot money from corrupt and rich people. He loots black money and tries to reform society, making sure the deserved people get postings in government departments. He forms a gang with him and starts to heist by posing as CBI and income tax officers.

The CBI appoints Kurunjivendhan to investigate and capture the thieves. Meanwhile, Iniyan falls in love with Madhu, and she accepts his marriage proposal. One day, the gang conducts an interview for the CBI (fake). The gang plans to raid a jewellery shop. Uthaman and Kurunjivendhan come to know about this, but learn that they already came and finished the raid. Kurunjivendhan, who apprehends Iniyan but appreciates his struggle against corruption, offers him and his gang to be police officers, but he rejects the offer as he believes that even more good can be done if he continues to do his deeds.

In the post-climax scene, He then reveals that all the police forces with Kurunjivendhan are actually the men he gave jobs to using the heist money. He escapes the place with ease.

== Cast ==
- Suriya as Nachinarkiniyan (Iniyan)/Uthaman (during raids)
- Karthik as Kurunjivendhan CBI Officer
- Keerthy Suresh as Madhu Iyengar, Iniyan's love interest
- Ramya Krishnan as Azhagu Meena (Jhansi Rani)
- Kalaiyarasan as Iniyan's friend
- RJ Balaji as 'Pallavaram' Paranjothi Pandian
- Senthil as KP
- Sathyan as Muthukumar "Muthu"
- Sivasankar as Ondiveeran "Ondi"
- Nandha as Police Inspector Vetrivel/Manga Madayan
- Suresh Chandra Menon as Uthaman CBI Officer (Voice Dubbed by Gautam Vasudev Menon)
- Thambi Ramaiah as Porchelvan
- Brahmanandam as a Hyderabad CBI Officer
- Anandaraj as Kuthalingam (Gandhi Appa)
- Yogi Babu as Narayanan
- Sudhakar as Azhagu Meena's husband
- Nirosha as Kuthalingam's wife
- Vinodhini as Mangaiyakarasi
- Bala Singh as Gunasekaran
- Venkatesh Harinathan as Kapil Gavaskar
- Gadam Kishan as Kapil's brother
- Ammu Abhirami as Azhagumathi (Azhagu Meena's daughter)
- Winner Ramachandran
- Meera Mitun as Iniyan’s friend’s wife

== Production ==
Following the success of the Hindi film Special 26 (2013), its director Neeraj Pandey revealed that he was approached by several filmmakers who were keen on producing a Tamil version of the film. N. Lingusamy subsequently bought the rights of the film and planned to produce the venture in collaboration with Friday Filmworks, who had made the original version, but the project failed to materialise. In August 2014, producer Thiagarajan announced that he had purchased the Tamil, Telugu, Malayalam and Kannada rights to remake Special 26, and revealed that he would also direct all four ventures. Thiagarajan's son Prashanth was revealed to be playing the lead role in Tamil, and by March 2015, Srikanth Ravichandran, then husband of television host Dhivyadharshini, was expected to direct the film.

After a period of little development, Prashanth revealed to the media in September 2015 that the film's shoot would commence soon after with R. Madhesh as the director of the project. The film failed to materialise over 2016 and it was widely reported in the media that the remake rights of the original film had been transferred from Thiagarajan to Studio Green and the film was to be made as Thaana Serndha Kootam by Vignesh Shivan with Suriya in the lead role. The title was taken from a dialogue spoken by Rajinikanth in Baashha (1995). However, in February 2017, Thiagarajan insisted that the film was still being planned with Prashanth in the lead role. In late 2017, Thiagarajan made an application seeking an interim stay of the film's release, claiming that his studio Staar Movies still owned the film's rights. He stated that Staar Movies had entered into an agreement with the original producers, Viacom18, in August 2014 and obtained the rights to remake the film in Tamil, Telugu, Malayalam and Kannada and that the agreement was valid for a period of three years. In early January 2018, the High Court refused the interim order application and called for the issues to be decided in a civil claim.

Vignesh Shivan agreed to work on Thaanaa Serndha Koottam at short notice, after another project, Kaathuvaakula Rendu Kaadhal became delayed. Studio Green's K. E. Gnanavel Raja asked Vignesh to do a project to star Suriya and the team chose to use an earlier script planned by Vignesh on the 1987 Opera House heist, like Special 26, where a group posing as Central Bureau of Investigation (CBI) officers executed an income tax raid on the jeweller in Mumbai, which he initially wanted to make with either actors Sivakarthikeyan or Vijay Sethupathi. The team claimed to legally purchase the remake rights of Special 26, but instead of copying the film scene-by-scene, Vignesh was insistent that it was adapted to make it suitable for Tamil audiences.

The film was announced to the public in September 2016, with principal photography starting in early November 2016. Keerthy Suresh was signed on as the lead actress, while an ensemble cast of veteran actors including Ramya Krishnan, Suresh Chandra Menon, Senthil and Sudhakar were also a part of the first schedule. Suresh Chandra Menon initially dubbed in his own voice, but it was later replaced with Gautham Vasudev Menon's voice. The film was predominantly shot across Chennai and Mysore, with the shoot finishing in August 2017. Post-production works for the film were completed at Knack Studios in Chennai. The film was also dubbed in Telugu as Gang, with Suriya choosing to dub for himself for the Telugu version for the first time.

== Music ==
Vignesh Shivan teamed up with Anirudh Ravichander to compose the soundtrack and background score of the film, once again after Naanum Rowdy Dhaan. This film also marks the first collaboration of Anirudh with Suriya and the only one till date. The tracklist features five songs, with lyrics by Thamarai, Vignesh Shivan and Mani Amudhavan, where the former and latter penned two songs each and the rest of the songs were penned by Vignesh Shivan. The soundtrack was released on 6 January 2018.

== Release ==
Thaana Serndha Kootam was released worldwide in theatres on 12 January 2018, two days before the Pongal festival. It was dubbed and released into Telugu as Gang on the same day.

=== Critical reception ===
M Suganth of The Times of India rated 3.5 out of 5 stars stating "The film works wonderfully well as long as it stays closer to the plot of Special 26, and the changes are superficial." Kirubhakar Purushothaman of India Today rated 2.5 stars out of 5 stating that "The film Thaanaa Serndha Koottam, starring Suriya released today and our review says that the film has not lived up to the original, Special 26." Writing for Firstpost, Sreedhar Pillai rated 3 out of 5 stars stating "TSK is an enjoyable ride for the entire family, and it’s refreshing to see Suriya back in form." Sify rated 3 out of 5 stars stating "It’s Suriyas committed performance, that keeps you invested in the narrative and the fascinating characters etched out brilliantly by Vignesh."

Vishal Menon of The Hindu stated "For a film that handles serious topics, TSK remains a feel good, light-hearted film, tailor-made for the festival weekend". Writing for Film Companion, Baradwaj Rangan rated 3 out of 5 stars stating "Vignesh Shivn’s mass-ified remake of Special 26, starring Suriya, is quite entertaining." Ashameera Aiyappan of The Indian Express rated 2.5 stars out of 5 stating "Walk in without expectation and let the Suriya and Keerthy Suresh starrer’s humour entertain you. As hard as the film tries to be serious, it is tough to take it so." Anupama Subramanian of Deccan Chronicle rated 3.5 out of 5 stars stating "Thaanaa Serndha Koottam is a fast paced heist that barely wastes a minute in portraying a comedic entertainer." Manigandan KR of Cinestaan rated 2 out of 5 stars stating "If you haven't watched the Hindi film Special 26 (2013), chances are you will like Thaanaa Serndha Koottam."

=== Box office ===
As of 25 January 2018, the film reportedly collected ₹90 crore (equivalent to ₹131 crore or US$14 million in 2026) worldwide, with the Tamil Nadu gross being ₹42.3 crore (equivalent to ₹62 crore or US$6.6 million in 2026) and all-India gross at ₹67.5 crore (equivalent to ₹99 crore or US$11 million in 2026) while the film collected ₹22.50 crore (equivalent to ₹33 crore or US$3.5 million in 2026) overseas.

== Accolades ==
At the 66th Filmfare Awards South, Anthony Daasan was nominated for the Best Male Playback Singer – Tamil, and Ramya Krishnan was nominated for Best Supporting Actress – Tamil. Daasan won the Ananda Vikatan Cinema Award for Best Male Playback Singer for the song "Sodakku".
