= Abhinaya (Kannada actress) =

Indian actress

- Occupation: Actress
- Years active: 1984–present
- Spouse: Umakanth (m. 2009)

Abhinaya (born 1971) is an Indian actress who works in Kannada films and soaps. She is best known for her performance in the 1984 movie Anubhava directed and enacted by Kashinath, which brought her Karnataka State Film Award for Best Actress in 1983–84.

== Career ==
Abhinaya entered films as a child artist. She acted in Bhagyavantha, Devatha Manushya and Benkiya Bale as child artist and got selected as a lead for the movie Anubhava at the age of 13. The movie was a massive hit and she got the Best Actress award in Karnataka State Film Awards in 1983 – 84.

Abhinaya went on to appear in many hit movies throughout 1980s and 1990s playing mostly supporting roles. After a gap, she made her comeback to the big screen through the movie Crush in 2019.

== Awards ==
- 1983–84 – Karnataka State Film Award for Best Actress – Anubhava
- 1984 – Filmfare Award for Best Actress – Kannada – Anubhava

== Selected filmography ==
Films

- Anubhava (1984)
- Kindari Jogi (1989)
- Gajapathi Garvabhanga (1989)
- Hathya Kanda (1990)
- Kollur Kala (1991)
- Urvashi Kalyana (1993)
- Appa Nanjappa Maga Gunjappa (1994)
- Police Dog (2002)
- Premigagi Naa (2002)
- Crush (2019)

Television

- Belli Chukki
- Devi
- Nagu Naguta Nali
- Baduku
- Agni Sakshi
- Kavyanjali
- Hitler Kalyana
- Katheyondu Shuruvagide
