= Premigagi Naa =

- Directed by: Snehapriya
- Written by: Snehapriya (dialogue)
- Screenplay by: D. Jayashankar
- Story by: Snehapriya
- Starring: Shankar; Vandana
- Cinematography: G Renukumar; S Krishna; Nagesh; A C Mahendra
- Edited by: B S Kemparaj
- Music by: Rajesh Ramanath
- Production company: Three Star Combines
- Release date: 17 October 2008
- Country: India
- Language: Kannada

Premigagi Naa (transl. I, for lovers) is a 2008 Indian Kannada-language romantic drama film directed by Snehaproya and starring Shankar and Vandana. The music for the film was composed by Rajesh Ramanath.

== Cast ==
- Shankar as Ramu
- Vandana as Prema
- Appu Venkatesh
- Suchithra
- Dwarakish
- Umashree
- Nagashekhar
- Abhinaya
- Sumitra
- S D Dayananda Katte
- Vaijanath Biradar

== Production ==
Shankar, Vandana, and Suchitra debuted in the film.

== Soundtrack ==
The music was composed by Rajesh Ramanath.

- "Aase Konalu" - K. J. Yesudas
- "Appu Thappi" - Shankar Mahadevan
- "Dilnal Love Bandre" - Udit Narayan, Shreya Ghoshal
- "Naa Haduve" - S. P. Balasubrahmanyam, K. S. Chithra
- "Neenu Nannavanu" - Hariharan, S. Janaki
- "Preethiya Sundara" - S. P. Balasubrahmanyam, K. S. Chithra

== Reception ==
R. G. Vijayasarathy of IANS wrote that "Snehapriya directed Premigaagi Naa is one such film which utterly fails to provide relief for the audience in any segment of film making". A critic from Bangalore Mirror wrote that "Everything in Premigaagi Na, including the dialogues, music and the hamming by the actors is repetitive". A critic from Rediff.com wrote that "The lyrical title may raise illusions of a good film but sadly that is not the case".
