= Anubhav (1986 film) =

1985 film by Kashinath

- Directed by: Kashinath
- Written by: Kashinath; Rahi Masoom Reza (dialogues)
- Produced by: Sujit Kumar; Kiran Singh; R. A. Singh
- Starring: Shekhar Suman; Padmini Kolhapure; Richa Sharma; Sujit Kumar; Paintal
- Music by: Rajesh Roshan
- Release date: 19 December 1986
- Running time: 139 minutes
- Country: India
- Language: Hindi

Anubhav (English: Experience) is a 1986 Bollywood adult drama film starring Shekhar Suman, Padmini Kolhapure and Richa Sharma, directed by Kashinath. The movie did not get much reception on release, but the film is notable for steamy scenes between Shekhar Suman and Richa Sharma. The film also has light comedy scenes. Rakesh Roshan did a guest appearance in the movie. This film is the Hindi remake of 1984 Kannada film Anubhava, in which Kashinath, director of the Hindi version, played the lead role.

== Plot ==
Ramesh works in a company in city. He learns that he is due to marry Gauri, whom he knew since childhood and also likes her. Gauri lives in a village with her mother and a younger brother. Though Gauri has grown into an adult, her habits and manners are still childish. Bijli is a mature village belle and likes Ramesh. Unlike Gauri, Bijli is gorgeous, vivacious and understands the needs of an adult man. She is aware of the marriage of Ramesh and Gauri but she has her plans. When Ramesh comes to the village, he finds Gauri to be immature and naive. Gauri doesn't reciprocate the desires of Ramesh. Then Ramesh marries Gauri, but even after marriage things don't change and much to the dismay of Ramesh, he is not able to consummate his marriage.

Bijli learns of this discord. She titillates Ramesh towards her and Ramesh now can't control himself. They start making love during their clandestine meetings. During one such meeting, Gauri sees them and realises her mistake and repents. She wants to correct her mistake, but the next day Ramesh leaves for the city to resume his job. Gauri is alone and she can't live without Ramesh. In the meantime, Bijli reaches the city and Ramesh and Bijli start living together as husband and wife there. After some days, Bijli starts getting bored of Ramesh as he doesn't spend money on Bijli. During this time, Bijli meets Amit, who lives in the neighbourhood and he also has a bike. Amit is a singer in a hotel. Hypergamous Bijli starts meeting Amit in the absence of Ramesh. At the same time, Ramesh also starts to realise that Bijli is becoming a burden on him. One day Ramesh finds out about Bijli and Amit, and he throws Bijli out of his house. Bijli leaves the house, but Amit accepts Bijli and she goes with him. In the meantime, Gauri and her uncle come to the city to seek Ramesh out as he has not replied to their letters, but they can't find him and return to the village dejectedly. On reaching the village, they find Ramesh in the house and now Gauri and Ramesh are united.

== Cast ==
- Shekhar Suman as Ramesh
- Padmini Kolhapure as Gauri
- Richa Sharma as Bijli
- Sujit Kumar as Mamaji
- Padma Khanna as Mamiji
- Seema Deo as Gauri's mother
- Paintal as Ramesh's co-worker
- Manmauji as Ramesh's co-worker
- Rakesh Roshan as Amit (guest appearance)
- Dinesh Hingoo as Drugstore keeper
- Master Jayant as Gauri's brother
- Jayant Rawal as cousin

== Soundtrack ==
The film had four songs. Rajesh Roshan also sang one song in the movie. The music was released on Venus records and cassettes.

Song	Singer
"Tere Nainon Ne Baan Chalaye"	S.P. Balasubrahmanyam, Alka Yagnik
"Bahon Me Aaja"	Rajesh Roshan
"Pyar Ka Dil Ko"	Lata Mangeshkar
"Tere Hi Pyar Se"	Asha Bhosle
