= Hum Naujawan =

1985 film by Dev Anand

- Poster
- Directed by: Dev Anand
- Written by: Dev Anand; Dilip Paradesi
- Produced by: Devina
- Starring: Dev Anand; Richa Sharma; Tabu
- Cinematography: D. K. Prabhakar
- Edited by: Babu Shaikh
- Music by: R. D. Burman
- Release date: 1985
- Running time: 137 minutes
- Country: India
- Language: Hindi

Hum Naujawan (transl. We are youngsters) is a 1985 Indian drama film directed by Dev Anand. He himself played the central character in the film dedicated to young students. It marked the debut of Richa Sharma, Tabu, Bunty Behl and Atlee Brar with Anupam Kher and Shreeram Lagoo among others, playing lead roles. The music was composed by R. D. Burman.

== Plot ==
Professor Hans takes up the position of principal at Oceanic College. His teenage daughter, Priya, is tragically raped and murdered. HeDuring his investigation, Hans discovers clues implicating Shammi, a college student and the son of the Home Minister, Desai. Despite informing Police Commissioner Khan, no action is taken against the minister's son. College students Rashmi and Sanjay assist Professor Hans in his quest for justice. Together, they devise a plan to trick Shammi into confessing to his heinous crime.

== Cast ==
- Dev Anand as Professor Hans Raj
- Richa Sharma as Rashmi
- Attley Brar as Shammi
- Tabu as Priya
- Bunty Behl as Sanjay
- Anupam Kher as Commissioner Sajid Khan
- Zarina Wahab as School Teacher Meenakshi
- Shreeram Lagoo as Home Minister Kamlesh Desai
- Ramesh Deo as Principal Dinesh Verma
- Pinchoo Kapoor as College Trustee 1
- Bharat Kapoor as College Trustee 2
- Dinesh Hingoo as a Professor
- Tabassum as Professor Batliwala
- Mohan Sherry

== Production ==
Tabassum, aged eleven, was spotted at a birthday party by Dev Anand before she was rechristened as Tabu and cast as his daughter.

== Soundtrack ==
The music was composed by R. D. Burman and the lyrics were written by Anjaan.

Song	Singer
"You Are My Darling, Tu Hai Meri Jaan, Tu Jahan Main Wahan"	Kishore Kumar, Penaz Masani
"Aa Jana Bahon Mein"	Asha Bhosle
"Ek Pal Pyar Ka Kabhi"	Asha Bhosle
"Tera Aana Ek Pal Mere"	Asha Bhosle
"Hum Naujawan, Hum Naujawan"	Suresh Wadkar, Mohammed Aziz, Anuradha Paudwal
