= Sadak Chhap =

- Directed by: Anil Ganguly
- Written by: Anwar Khan
- Screenplay by: Sachin Bhowmick
- Story by: Sachin Bhowmick
- Produced by: Anil Ganguly
- Starring: Jackie Shroff; Padmini Kolhapure; Richa Sharma
- Cinematography: Pratap Sinha
- Edited by: Waman Bhonsle; Gurudutt Shirali
- Music by: Bappi Lahiri
- Release date: 24 July 1987
- Country: India
- Language: Hindi

Sadak Chhap is a 1987 Indian Hindi-language action drama film produced and directed by Anil Ganguly. It stars Jackie Shroff, Padmini Kolhapure, Richa Sharma in pivotal roles.

== Cast ==
- Jackie Shroff as Shankar
- Padmini Kolhapure as Anju
- Richa Sharma as Natasha
- Biswajeet as Laxman
- Anjana Mumtaz as Shankar's Mother
- Amrish Puri as MP Dharamdas
- Deven Verma as Ramaiya
- Gulshan Grover as Romi
- Moolchand as Jewelr
- Nandita Thakur as Natasha's Maidservant
- Vijay Arora as Police Inspector Surajbhan More
- Goga Kapoor as Goga
- Tiku Talsania as Jaikishan
- Padma Khanna as Ganga
- Dinesh Hingoo as Ghasitaram Todarmal
- Huma Khan as Julie
- Bharati Achrekar as Kamla
- Usha Nadkarni as Drisha, Ramaiya's Mother
- Manik Irani as Billa
- Abhi Bhattacharya as Police Commissioner Narendra
- Jankidas as Seth Janikidas

== Music ==
Lyrics: Anjaan

Song	Singer
"Main Sadak Chaap Hoon"	Kishore Kumar
"Main Sadak Chhap Hoon" (Sad)	Kishore Kumar
"Pehli Pehli Baar Aankhen Jab Ho Chaar"	Kishore Kumar, Padmini Kolhapure
"Sahibaan, Mera Naam Abdullah"	Bappi Lahiri, S. Janaki
"Jab Tu Mila Achha Laga"	Alisha Chinai
