= Taskaree =

2026 Indian television series

- Official release poster
- Also known as: Taskaree – The Smuggler's Web
- Genre: Crime; Thriller
- Created by: Neeraj Pandey
- Written by: Neeraj Pandey; Vipul K. Rawal
- Directed by: Neeraj Pandey; Raghav M Jairath; B. A. Fida
- Starring: Emraan Hashmi; Sharad Kelkar; Nandish Sandhu; Anurag Sinha; Amruta Khanvilkar; Zoya Afroz
- Music by: Advait Nemlekar
- Country of origin: India
- Original language: Hindi
- No. of seasons: 1
- No. of episodes: 7

Production
- Producer: Shital Bhatia
- Cinematography: Sudheer Palsane; Arvind Singh
- Editor: Praveen Kathikuloth
- Running time: 38–58 minutes
- Production company: Friday Storytellers

Original release
- Network: Netflix
- Release: 14 January 2026

Taskaree: The Smuggler's Web (lit. 'Smuggling: The Smuggler's Web') is a 2026 Indian Hindi-language crime thriller television series created by Neeraj Pandey and written by Vipul K Rawal along with Neeraj Pandey for Netflix, produced under the banner of Friday Storytellers. The series follows an Indian Customs Service team stationed at Chhatrapati Shivaji Maharaj International Airport as they combat an international smuggling syndicate. The series stars Emraan Hashmi, Sharad Kelkar, Amruta Khanvilkar, Zoya Afroz, Nandish Sandhu and Anurag Sinha.

The series premiered on Netflix on 14 January 2026. Upon release, Taskaree received mixed reviews from critics, with praise directed at its performances and grounded treatment of smuggling operations but criticism towards writing. Taskaree achieved significant global viewership, becoming the first Indian series to top Netflix's global non-English television list.

== Synopsis ==
Set at Chhatrapati Shivaji Maharaj International Airport in Mumbai, the story follows a suspended but principled customs officer, Superintendent Arjun Meena (Emraan Hashmi), who is reinstated to lead a special task force against an international smuggling syndicate. The team is appointed by Assistant Commissioner Prakash Kumar (Anurag Sinha) of the Central Board of Indirect Taxes and Customs and consists of officers who were previously sidelined for refusing to engage in corruption, including fearless field officer Ravi Gujjar (Nandish Sandhu) and detail-oriented officer Mitali Kamath (Amruta Khanvilkar).

As the task force begins dismantling smuggling operations, they confront deep-rooted corruption, political interference, and the criminal network of smuggler Bada Choudhary (Sharad Kelkar). Their mission becomes increasingly perilous following targeted violence and the deaths of officers, revealing that the threat extends beyond smugglers to compromised officials within the system.

The narrative builds toward a high-stakes operation involving a large gold-smuggling attempt disguised under diplomatic cover. While the task force succeeds in exposing the plot and bringing down the syndicate, the victory comes at a personal cost, underscoring the ongoing and relentless battle against corruption.

== Cast ==
- Emraan Hashmi as Arjun Meena, Superintendent of Customs
- Sharad Kelkar as
  - Rajeev Choudhary aka Bada Choudhary, the leader of the smuggling syndicate
  - Chota Choudhary, Bada Choudhary's corrupt brother
- Nandish Sandhu as Ravinder Gujjar
- Amruta Khanvilkar as Mitali Kamath
- Anurag Sinha as Prakash Kumar, Assistant Commissioner of Customs
- Zoya Afroz as Priya Khubchandani
- Virendra Saxena as Shrikant Saxena
- Jameel Khan as Suresh Kaka
- Sumit Nijhawan as Anna, an officer in the smuggling syndicate
- Anuja Sathe as Meenakshi, a salesgirl and Ravinder's ex
- Freddy Daruwala as Rahul, a smuggler and Anna's nephew
- Krishan Tondon as Sharma Ji
- Ekavalli Khanna as Mrs. Sayyed
- Pravina Deshpande as Hema Khagani
- Giulia Sacco as Bianca (Binita Choudhary), Bada Choudhary's wife and a former model
- Sajjad Hussain as Chief Commissioner of Customs
- Hemant Kher as Custom Officer Jainesh Patel
- Pravina Deshpande as Hema Khangani
- Hrishikesh Joshi as Custom Officer Pawar
- Nilanjan Datta as Custom Officer Bijoy Das
- Shailesh Datar as Ramesh Bhai
- Akshaya Naik as Swati Salunkhe
- Mohit Dagga as Custom Officer Awasthi
- Akash Ayyar as Custom Officer Kulvir Dhuria
- Nancy Bhasin as Custom Officer Srilata Nair
- Kamal Lalvani as Custom Officer Ravi Tripathi
- Rajat Bhasin as Custom Officer Sajjad Sheikh
- Raghavendra Tiwary as Custom Officer Vincent Roy
- Kachraoo Khan as Custom Constable Thapa
- Abeer Meherish as Captain Shubham Kapoor
- Shahid Lateef as Arbab
- Sameer Al Obaidli as Omar
- Ujjwal Gaurahha as Govind Belani
- Smita Ray as Shalini
- Rajeev Kumar as Admin Superintendent
- Rajniesh Kaushik as Officer Ashok Dubey
- Vijay Vikram Singh as CBIC Chairman
- Nitin Rao as Raghu
- Prashant Singh as Santosh Towari Dri
- Mohit Sharma as Custom Officer Vivek Dhahiya
- Nitesh Kalbande as Varun
- Deepankar Mukherjee as Custom Officer Arindam Banerjee
- Pradeep Bhaskar as Aslam
- Shubham Kumar as Mukeem
- Shyam Jethnani as Rich Businessman
- Mohammed Al Fahad as Police Officer
- Nimisha Sirohi as Burkha Lady
- Sangeeta Pusalkar as Mrs. Sharma
- Kaira as Mitali's daughter

== Episodes ==
No.	Title	Directed by	Written by	Original release date	Length
1	"Customs vs Popat"	Neeraj Pandey	Vipul K Rawal, Neeraj Pandey	14 January 2026	45 minutes
The Indian Government appoints honest officers at strategic airports to curb smuggling. Prakash Kumar is assigned as Assistant Commissioner of Customs to Chatrapati Shivaji Maharaj Mumbai International Airport (coloquically Mumbai International Airport). He brings in three Custom Officers―currently suspended, but known for their honesty―Arjun Meena, Mitali Kamath and Ravinder Gujjar. The trio then forms their own team. The modus operandi of narcotics smuggling through popats (couriers) is explained.
2	"Bada Choudhary"	Raghav M Jairath	Vipul K Rawal, Neeraj Pandey	14 January 2026	38 minutes
The smuggling syndicate is headed by Ranjeet 'Bada' Chaudhary. Bada Chaudhary chose the life of crime after his brother's murder by a rival. The smuggling syndicate operates via Milan, Al Dera (fictional city previously mentioned in Neeraj Pandey's 2015 film Baby) and Ethiopia. Gujjar notices a pattern in Priya's travel history and discusses his suspicion with Arjun.
3	"The Priya Story"	B. A. Fida	Vipul K Rawal, Neeraj Pandey	14 January 2026	51 minutes
Priya Khubchandani is an air hostess who smuggles gold on the behest of her fiancé and Captain Shubham Kapoor. Arjun arrests her red-handed but offers her release provided that she help him catch Captain Kapoor instead. Priya agrees and soon infiltrates the Chaudhary gold smuggling syndicate in Ethiopia. She informs Arjun that the syndicate has devised a method to turn gold into powdery substance and pass customs check undetected. Arjun mulls over a way to give Chaudhary syndicate a big blow.
4	"Operation Longshot"	Raghav M Jairath	Vipul K Rawal, Neeraj Pandey	14 January 2026	42 minutes
Prakash and Arjun assign their team to an International Conference and delude Chaudhary syndicate into believing that Mumbai International Airport will be free of honest officers for one whole day. The syndicate plans to smuggle big load of gold, narcotics and luxury goods. Prakash changes the duty roster at the last moment and Operation Longshot is unveiled. The Custom Officers seize all smuggled goods. Priya is rescued from Al Dera and sent to a safe house in Mumbai. The team celebrates.
5	"Hum Coin Hain"	B. A. Fida	Vipul K Rawal, Neeraj Pandey	14 January 2026	43 minutes
The team extracts information from Aslam and Mukim, two of the syndicate couriers. Mukim names Ramesh Bhai as the Indian head of operations. The team leaves to arrest Ramesh Bhai. Aslam is ordered to kill Mukim in custody. The Customs Chief Commissioner sends Prakash on an urgent conference to Bangkok where he is ambushed by Bada Chaudhary. Ramesh Bhai dies in a skirmish with Kulvir.
6	"Darr Ka Dhandha"	Raghav M Jairath	Vipul K Rawal, Neeraj Pandey	14 January 2026	42 minutes
All team members are threatened in various ways by the Chaudhary syndicate. Bada Chaudhary warns Arjun against seizing the smuggled gold soon landing in Mumbai. Gujjar arrests the popats anyway, incurring Chaudhary's wrath. Gujjar is killed by Chaudhary's henchmen and framed in fake corruption charges post death. Arjun suspects Kulvir, Kulvir admits to killing Ramesh Bhai in exchange of a bribe worth INR 1 crore. Bada Chaudhary threatens to kill Priya.
7	"Kahani Khatam"	Neeraj Pandey	Vipul K Rawal, Neeraj Pandey	14 January 2026	58 minutes
Prakash asks Arjun about the identity of Ravinder's informer. Bada Chaudhary faces pressure from Omar and Arbab. It is revealed that Prakash too, is working for Bada Chaudhary. Bada Chaudhary decides to smuggle 2 tonnes worth of gold. Arjun and Bada Chaudhary realise that Ravinder's informer is Suresh Kaka. Priya returns to Al Dera to presumably rejoin the Chaudhary syndicate. Arjun looks for smuggled gold in coffins but finds none. He realises the gold is being smuggled via Diplomatic Cargo and seizes the gold while unveiling Prakash's corruption. COIN officers arrest Chaudhary syndicate in Al Dera. Priya and Suresh Kaka are rescued.

== Production ==
=== Development ===
Taskaree is based on real-life incidents and required extensive research. Writers Neeraj Pandey and Vipul K. Rawal were introduced to both retired and active smugglers by the series’ consultant, who is a customs officer. The series marks the fourth collaboration produced under Neeraj Pandey's Friday Filmworks.

=== Casting ===
Director Raghav M Jairath described Sharad Kelkar as an easy choice for the role of the antagonist, citing his strong screen presence. Amruta Khanvilkar was initially approached for a brief role, which was later played by Anuja Sathe; however, the makers subsequently asked her to audition for the role of Mitali. Nitin Rao, who had previously worked with the production on Kaun Pravin Tambe?, compared his role in Taskaree with his earlier work, stating that the contrast allowed him to explore a completely different side of himself as an actor. Mohammed Al Fahad, who portrays a police officer in the series, became the first Bahraini actor to appear in a major Bollywood production.

=== Filming ===
Following a plot centred on an Indian Customs Service team at the Chhatrapati Shivaji Maharaj International Airport in Mumbai tackling an international criminal syndicate, the series was shot on location in Mumbai, Goa, Delhi, Milan, Bangkok, Abu Dhabi, Al-Dera'a, Addis Ababa as well as in Bahrain. During the shoot, Emraan Hashmi, Amruta Khanvilkar, and Nandish Sandhu were collectively referred to as the “Trimurti” by the crew, owing to their chemistry. Khanvilkar sustained a hand injury while filming an action sequence, resulting in swelling that lasted for approximately a month. Cyril Raffaelli was one of the stunt coordinators for the show.

== Marketing and release ==
The trailer of the series was released on 7 January 2026. The series premiered on Netflix on 14 January 2026 in Hindi and dubbed versions of Tamil, Telugu, and English languages.

== Reception ==
It became the first Indian series to reach number one on Netflix's global non-English TV list. According to Tudum’s weekly chart, Taskaree recorded 5.4 million views and 29.4 million hours of watch time in its debut week, securing the top position worldwide and finishing ahead of the Korean romantic comedy Can This Love Be Translated? The show continued its strong momentum in the second week, adding another 3.9 million views and 21.2 million hours of watch time, and retained a place in Netflix’s global Top 10 non-English shows, ranking third overall. In just 12 days following its release, the series crossed an impressive 9.3 million views, while accumulating more than 50.6 million total hours watched in its first two weeks. In comparison, Netflix’s earlier 2025 release Black Warrant achieved 9.8 million views over its entire run. Following its release, Zoya Afroz, Amruta Khanvilkar, Anurag Sinha, and Emraan Hashmi ranked first, second, third, and sixth respectively on IMDb’s Popular Indian Celebrities list for the week, while director Neeraj Pandey ranked tenth.

=== Critical response ===
Risha Ganguly of Times Now rated the series 3.5 out of 5 stars and wrote that "Taskaree: The Smuggler’s Web is a competently crafted crime series that prioritises realism over spectacle. While it lacks narrative surprises and occasionally struggles with momentum, strong performances, especially by Emraan Hashmi and Sharad Kelkar, keep it engaging." Titas Chowdhury of News 18 also gave it 3.5 stars out of 5 and stated that "Emraan Hashmi's performance relies less on bravado and more on contained intensity. Alternatively, Sharad Kelkar, meant to project menace and moral rot, remains curiously bland."

Bollywood Hungama rated the series 3 out of 5 stars and remarked that "On the whole, TASKAREE: THE SMUGGLER’S WEB is a unique one-of-a-kind show on customs and smuggling and impresses with its light-hearted narrative, comic and dramatic moments, a few twists and performances by the lead cast." Lachmi Deb Roy of Firstpost also gave the series 3 stars out of 5, writing that "You can binge-watch the show, but you can watch it at one go too, just the way I did, because once you start watching, you won’t feel like giving it up. Wait till the very end because that is the real twist of the show. Not for a minute are you going to get bored." Srishti Walia of Outlook rated the series 3 out of 5 stars and observed that "Pandey paces the series well, with characters grounded in their workplace and navigating the nitty-gritty of concealing illegal goods." Anuj Kumar of The Hindu noted that "Emraan Hashmi leads Neeraj Pandey’s thriller that trades explosive momentum for nuanced depictions of smuggling and the personal cost of integrity." Nandini Ramnath of Scroll.in wrote in her review that "There isn’t a trace of guilty pleasure over the 1970s movie-like scenes of smugglers operating somewhere in the foreign to push gold bars, drugs and expensive watches into India. There is no dearth of ideas in Taskaree for how to bring contraband into the country."

Kabir Singh Bhandari of Free Press Journal rated the series 2.5 out of 5 stars and said, "The series is like a tutorial on how smuggling is carried out at airports and what the role of the customs officers entail." In The Tribune, Nonika Singh, who also rated the series 2.5 out of 5 stars, noted, “The drama turns too filmy and has the trademark strengths and weaknesses of a signature Pandey series.” Reviewing for NDTV, Saibal Chatterjee rated the series 2.5 out of 5 stars and remarked that “if only the sheen of novelty wasn't dulled by facile plot twists, it would have been a far more captivating show.” Rahul Desai of The Hollywood Reporter India stated that it has "a bingeable world, a skippable storyline, and the Neeraj Pandey-helmed series falls into old habits despite exploring uncharted territory." Aishwarya Vasudevan of OTT Play rated it 2 out of 5 stars and commented that "Emraan Hashmi shines, but Taskaree: The Smuggler's Web sinks. Despite the global scale, the plot is predictable, and tropes are heavy. A hollow, abrupt thriller that lacks real substance and punch." Cinema Express critic Kartik Bhardwaj observed that "The series begins well but then plot churnings take over and everything is rushed."
