= Ouch (2016 film) =

- Directed by: Neeraj Pandey
- Starring: Manoj Bajpayee; Pooja Chopra
- Release date: 2016
- Running time: 15 minutes
- Country: India
- Language: Hindi

Ouch is a 2016 Hindi dark comedy short film directed by Neeraj Pandey, starring Manoj Bajpayee and former miss India Pooja Chopra.

== Premise ==
The story centers on Priya (Pooja) and Vinay (Manoj), who are co-workers and have been in a relationship for three years. However, there is a twist: Both of them are already married and have children. The movie begins with Vinay entering a hotel room confidently, but then he becomes anxious as he waits for Priya. When she arrives with a suitcase, she is in tears. They sit down to talk about their future and how their spouses reacted when they asked for a divorce.

Vinay informs Priya that he has been honest with his wife and received an angry response in return, even having an object thrown at him. However, he is shocked to learn that Priya has not held up her end of the agreement and has not discussed anything with her husband. In fact, she wants to end the relationship with Vinay. This sudden revelation puts Vinay in a difficult situation.

== Reception ==
Namrata Thakker of Rediff awarded the film 3 out of 5 stars. She noted that the film addresses a pertinent subject of extramarital affairs without adopting a preachy tone. The film manages to be authentic and impactful while incorporating a substantial amount of humor.

Roshmila Bhattacharya from Mumbai Mirror awarded the film a rating of 3.5/5. She commended Manoj Bajpayee's performance, stating, "As usual, the versatile and supremely talented Manoj is at his assured best, showcasing a range of emotions with effortless ease."

Sankhayan Ghosh, writing for Mint newspaper, lauded Manoj Bajpayee and commented, "The actor, always captivating even in familiar territory, succeeds in making it effective. In the hands of a less skilled actor, the humor might have missed the mark."

Pune Mirror wrote "Ouch, is a dark comedy which neatly turns the tables on the man-woman equation through a tongue."

Firstpost wrote "The 14-minutes film gives a funny yet brutally honest take on extra-marital affairs. The film reveals a conversation between colleagues Vinay and Priya who have been in an extra-marital relationship for three years and now have to part ways."

== Accolades ==
- 2017: Ouch was nominated for the Filmfare Short Film Award in 2017.
