= Buddha Mar Gaya =

- Directed by: Rahul Rawail
- Written by: Raju Saigal; Anand Sivakumaran
- Produced by: Rohit Kumar; Sunil Lulla; Rahul Rawail
- Starring: Om Puri; Paresh Rawal; Anupam Kher
- Cinematography: Suhass Gujarathi
- Edited by: Rahul Rawail
- Music by: Bappi Lahiri
- Release date: 17 August 2007
- Running time: 92 minutes
- Country: India
- Language: Hindi

Buddha Mar Gaya (transl. The old man died) is a 2007 Indian Hindi-language black comedy film by Rahul Rawail. It stars Om Puri, Paresh Rawal and Anupam Kher. Buddha Mar Gaya was released on 17 August 2007.

== Plot ==
Laxmikant Kabadiya is portrayed as one of India's richest industrialists, a self-made man who's risen from selling scrap to become a construction magnate. His conglomerate is on the verge of a 5000 crore ($1 billion) IPO that should make them one of the largest companies in the country. LK's family - his spinster twin sister Prernahumor, his two sons Ranjeet and Sameer, their wives Shruti and Anju (Mona Ambegaonkar) respectively and Ranjeet's daughters Sanjana and Namrata, and Sameer's son, Pawan, can't stop salivating at the thought of all that money.

Just when everything seems to be going according to plan fate throws the family into chaos. The night before their company’s IPO opens LK dies unexpectedly while being intimate, with Kim, an actress who hopes to star in LK’s upcoming film. Of focusing on LK’s loss the family panics about the impact LK’s death could have on their share sales. On the advice of their family guru, Vidyut Baba the family decides to keep LK’s death a secret for two days until all the shares are sold.. The family’s attempt to hide LK’s truth soon leads to a series of unexpected and hilarious complications.

Hiding the death of someone famous as LK is not a simple matter. Every time the group plans to announce LKs death, unexpected events cause them to postpone the announcement. To keep the truth hidden the group invents the deaths of friends or relatives and sets up fake funerals. The situation becomes more tricky when the group must create fake dead bodies and have LK appear at these funerals even though LK is dead.

== Cast ==
- Om Puri as Vidyut 'Vidya' Baba
- Paresh Rawal as Ramu
- Anupam Kher as Laxmikant 'LK' Kabadiya
- Ranvir Shorey as Munna
- Mukesh Tiwari as Sameer L. Kabadiya
- Mahabanoo Mody-Kotwal as Prerna 'Bua' Kabadiya
- Mona Ambegaonkar as Anju Kabadiya
- Murli Sharma as Rohan Alexander
- Mannat Kaur as Shruti
- Madhavi Singh as Namrata
- Heenaa Biswas as Sanjana
- Jay Soni as Pawan
- Jitender Bhargava
- Bobby Parvez as Ranjeet L. Kabadiya
- Manoj Joshi as ACP Ashwini Khandekar
- Birbal as Havaldar
- Prem Chopra as Prem Chopra
- Pratima Kazmi as Police Inspector
- Vinay Pathak
- Rakhi Sawant as Kim / Vishkanya
- Raj Tilak as Malwankar

== Soundtrack ==
Music is composed by Bappi Lahiri and lyrics penned by Manoj Muntashir. The soundtrack of the film contains one Title Track called "Buddha Mar Gaya" sung by Sunidhi Chauhan, Kunal Ganjawala and Shaan.

== Reception ==
Khalid Mohamed of Hindustan Times gave it 1.5 stars and described it as a "hyper-VULGAR comedy." Syed Firdaus Ashraf of Rediff.com gave the film 1 star out 5, writing, ″Director Rawail's fantasies are appalling; he shows a rocket taking off or injections dripping whenever Rakhi is in bed. The film's tag line, 'You will die laughing' should have been 'You will die crying'. It's about time Rawail, who once made decent films like Betaab, Arjun and Dacait, retires from direction.″ Shubhra Gupta of The Indian Express wrote, ″The trouble with Rahul Rawail's movie is not its premise: that old men can also have a good time in bed, even though most of us, like good hypocritical Indians, would be horrified at admitting it. It's in the execution, which falls uneasily between crass and classy: the audience doesn't quite know whether to laugh or to cringe. Is this the same man who gave us the polished thrillers, Arjun and Dacait?″

Taran Adarsh of Bollywood Hungama gave it three stars out of five and concluded that it "has terrific title-value, abundant shock-value and strong entertainment-value as factors going in its favor".
