= Richa Sharma (actress) =

Indian film actress (1964–1996)

Richa Sharma Dutt
- Sharma in 1989
- Born: 13 August 1964; Bombay, Maharashtra, India
- Died: 10 December 1996 (aged 32); New York City, U.S
- Other name: Richa Sharma Dutt
- Occupations: Actress; model
- Years active: 1985–1987
- Notable work: Hum Naujawan (1985)
- Spouse: Sanjay Dutt (m. 1987)
- Children: 1

Richa Sharma (6 August 1964 – 13 December 1996), also known by her married name Richa Sharma Dutt, was an Indian actress and model who worked in Bollywood. She married Sanjay Dutt in 1987 and died of a brain tumour in 1996.

== Career ==
Sharma had approached Dev Anand at a film shoot wanting to be cast as his next heroine but was too young. Dev promised her that he would cast her once she grew older, he then eventually gave her a break with Hum Naujawan in 1985. She next went on to act in several films like Anubhav, Insaaf Ki Awaaz, Sadak Chhap and Aag Hi Aag in 1987.

== Filmography ==
| Year | Film | Role | Language | Notes |
|---|---|---|---|---|
| 1985 | Hum Naujawan | Rashmi | Hindi | Debut film |
| 1986 | Anubhav | Bijli | Hindi | |
| 1986 | Insaaf Ki Awaaz | Renu | Hindi | |
| 1987 | Sadak Chhap | Natasha | Hindi | |
| 1987 | Aag Hi Aag | Tulsi Singh | Hindi | Last film |

== Personal life and death ==
Sharma married Bollywood actor, Sanjay Dutt in New York City, United States in 1987. The couple had a daughter, Trishala Dutt. Within two years of marriage, she was diagnosed with a brain tumour. Sharma died at her parents' home in New York on 10 December 1996.
