= The Anupam Kher Show – Kucch Bhi Ho Sakta Hai =

- Genre: Talk show
- Presented by: Anupam Kher
- Country of origin: India
- Original language: Hindi
- No. of seasons: 2
- No. of episodes: 25

Production
- Producer: Herman D'Souza
- Running time: 44 minutes

Original release
- Network: Colors TV
- Release: 6 July 2014 – 1 November 2015

The Anupam Kher Show – Kucch Bhi Ho Sakta Hai ('The Anupam Kher Show – Anything Can Happen') is a 2014 Indian Hindi-language talk show aired on Colors TV that is hosted by Anupam Kher. It features a new celebrity every week. The first actor to appear on the show was Shah Rukh Khan. The first season ended on 21 September 2014.

Second Season premiered on 2 August 2015 featuring Priyanka Chopra. The second season ended on 1 November 2015 with Kajol Devgan in finale episode.

== Guests ==
Episode No	Celebrity	Original air date
1	Shah Rukh Khan	6 July 2014
2	Shah Rukh Khan	13 July 2014
3	Mahesh Bhatt & Alia Bhatt	20 July 2014
4	Kangana Ranaut	27 July 2014
5	Naseeruddin Shah & Om Puri	3 August 2014
6	Vidya Balan	10 August 2014
7	Kapil Sharma	17 August 2014
8	David Dhawan & Varun Dhawan	24 August 2014
9	Sonam Kapoor & Arjun Kapoor	31 August 2014
10	Parineeti Chopra & Aditya Roy Kapur	7 September 2014
11	Yuvraj Singh	14 September 2014
12	Akshay Kumar	21 September 2014
13	Priyanka Chopra	2 August 2015
14	Gulzar	9 August 2015
15	Anil Kapoor	16 August 2015
16	Sonu Nigam	23 August 2015
17	Irrfan Khan	30 August 2015
18	Suresh Raina	6 September 2015
19	Madhuri Dixit	13 September 2015
20	Boman Irani & Paresh Rawal	20 September 2015
21	Manoj Bajpai & Tabu	27 September 2015
22	Waheeda Rehman & Asha Parekh	4 October 2015
23	Sania Mirza	11 October 2015
24	Rishi Kapoor	25 October 2015
25	Kajol Devgan	1 November 2015
