= Anupam Kher =

Indian actor and filmmaker (born 1955)

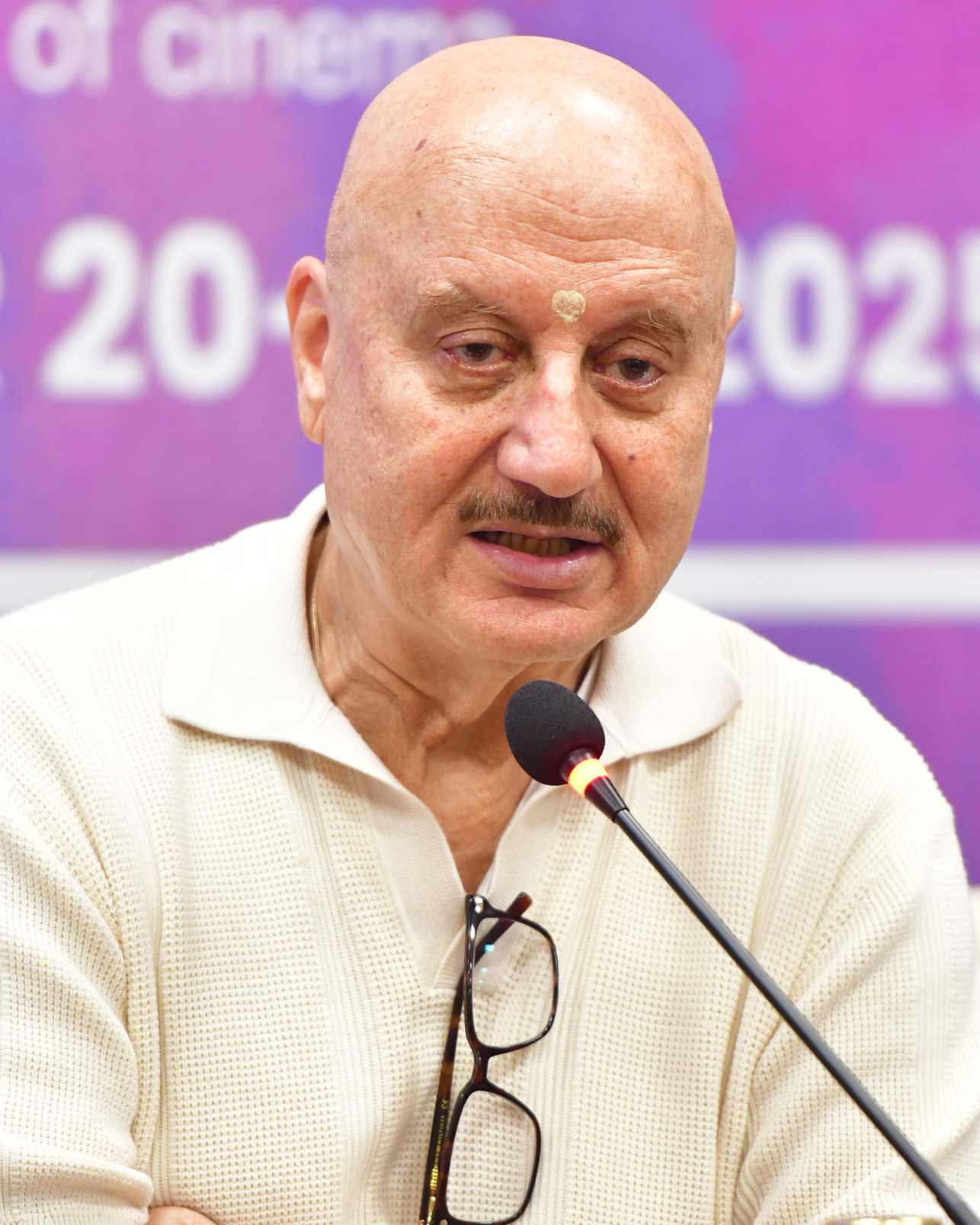
- Kher in 2025
- Born: 7 March 1955 (age 71); Simla, PEPSU, India
- Education: Panjab University (BA); National School of Drama
- Occupations: Actor; producer
- Works: Full list
- Office: Chairman of the Film and Television Institute of India
- Term: 11 October 2017 – 31 October 2018
- Predecessor: Gajendra Chauhan
- Successor: B. P. Singh
- Spouses: Madhumalti Kapoor (m. 1978, separated) Kirron Kher (m. 1985)
- Children: Sikandar Kher (stepson)
- Relatives: Raju Kher (brother)
- Awards: Full list
- Website: www.anupamkherfoundation.org

Anupam Kher (born 7 March 1955) is an Indian actor, director and producer who works primarily in Hindi cinema. In a career spanning over four decades, he has acted in more than 540 films. A veteran of Indian cinema, Kher is recipient of two National Film Awards and eight Filmfare Awards for his acting performances. Government of India awarded him the Padma Shri in 2004 and the Padma Bhushan in 2016 for his contribution to Indian cinema and arts.

Kher made his acting debut with Mahesh Bhatt-directed drama film Saaransh (1984), which marked Kher's breakthrough role, earning him the Filmfare Award for Best Actor for his portrayal of an elderly father. Since then he starred in several other supporting roles. He was appreciated in negative roles in films such as Karma (1986), Tezaab (1988) and ChaalBaaz (1989). For Vijay (1988), he won the Filmfare Best Supporting Actor Award for his performance. In 1989, Ram Lakhan garnered him wider recognition for his comic performances and won him Filmfare Award for Best Performance in a Comic Role, and for Daddy, he won a National Film Award – Special Jury Award and Filmfare Critics Award for Best Performance. In later years, Kher was nominated for Filmfare Best Supporting Actor Award for Dil (1990), Saudagar (1991), Lamhe (1991), Hum Aapke Hain Koun (1994), Chaahat (1996), Special 26 (2013) and Uunchai (2022). He was nominated in the category of Filmfare Award for Best Comedian for films, such as Dil Hai Ke Manta Nahin (1991), Shola Aur Shabnam (1992), Kuch Kuch Hota Hai (1998), Dulhan Hum Le Jayenge (2000), and won for Khel (1992), Darr (1993) and Dilwale Dulhania Le Jayenge (1995).

Kher's other acclaimed roles include Khosla Ka Ghosla (2006), Buddha Mar Gaya (2006), A Wednesday! (2008), Baby (2015), M. S. Dhoni: The Untold Story (2016), The Kashmir Files (2022) and Metro... In Dino (2025). Besides working in Hindi films, he has also appeared in international films such as the Golden Globe-nominated Bend It Like Beckham (2002), Ang Lee's Golden Lion-winning NC-17 rated Lust, Caution (2007), David O. Russell's Oscar-winning Silver Linings Playbook (2012) and Anthony Maras' Hotel Mumbai (2019). He received a BAFTA nomination for his supporting role in the British television film The Boy with the Topknot (2018). Anupam Kher will portray Rabindranath Tagore in his 538th film.

He has previously served as the Chairman of the Central Board of Film Certification and the National School of Drama in India. Kher was appointed Chairman of the Film and Television Institute of India (FTII) in October 2017. His appointment was controversial, given his support for the Bharatiya Janata Party. A year later, he resigned as the chairman of the FTII, citing his work commitments for the American TV show New Amsterdam.

== Early life and background ==
Anupam Kher was born on 7 March 1955 in Simla, in the erstwhile Patiala and East Punjab States Union of India (now in Himachal Pradesh), into a Kashmiri Pandit family. His father, Pushkar Nath Kher was a clerk in the forest department of Himachal Pradesh and his mother, Dulari Kher was a housewife. He was educated at D. A. V. School in Shimla. He studied economics at Government College, Sanjauli under Himachal Pradesh University, Shimla, but dropped out to study Indian theatre at Panjab University, Chandigarh.

In 1978, Kher graduated from the National School of Drama (NSD) in New Delhi. Some of his early roles were in plays performed at the Himachal Pradesh University. He taught drama in Raj Bisaria's Bharatendu Natya Akademi in Lucknow, Uttar Pradesh for a small part in his directorial debut movie Sheeshay ka Ghar. In his early struggling days as an actor in Bombay (present-day Mumbai), he reportedly slept on a railway platform for a month.

== Acting career ==
=== Debut and early career (1984–1988) ===
Anupam Kher made his acting debut in 1984 with Mahesh Bhatt's drama film Saaransh. It didn't perform well commercially, but was a huge critical success and was chosen as India's official entry for the Academy Award for Best Foreign Language Film. Kher received widespread acclaim for his portraying a 60-year-old man trying to come to terms with the loss of his only son and won his first and only Filmfare Award for Best Actor. The following year, however, none of his films performed well critically or commercially with Rahul Rawail's action drama Arjun co-starring Sunny Deol and Dimple Kapadia being the exception. This changed in 1986 when he co-starred alongside Amitabh Bachchan in K. Bhagyaraj's crime drama Aakhree Raasta and played the ruthless villain "Dr. Michael Dang" in Subhash Ghai's ensemble actioner Karma, which had Dilip Kumar, Jackie Shroff, Anil Kapoor, Naseeruddin Shah and Sridevi in the lead. While the former was a hit, Karma went on to become a blockbuster and Kher was noticed by the audience. The same year, he played supporting role in another major commercial success, which was - Insaaf Ki Awaaz.

In 1987, he appeared alongside Rekha and Raj Babbar in T. Rama Rao's family drama Sansar, which was a commercially successful venture. In 1988, he played negative roles in films, such as Hatya, Zakhmi Aurat and Tezaab. Out of these releases, Hatya and Zakhmi Aurat were semi-hits, while the lattermost went many steps ahead and emerged a blockbuster as well as the highest earning film of that year. Kher's other notable release of 1988, Vijay failed at the box office, but won him his first and only Filmfare Award for Best Supporting Actor.

=== Breakthrough, public recognition and awards success (1989–2001) ===
After many years of lukewarm critical and commercial success, Kher became a household name in 1989 when he starred in Subhash Ghai's masala film Ram Lakhan, Rajiv Rai's action drama Tridev, Yash Chopra's romantic musical Chandni, Vidhu Vinod Chopra's crime drama Parinda and Pankaj Parashar's comedy drama ChaalBaaz. All the films proved to be critically and commercially successful, especially Ram Lakhan, Tridev and Chandni, all three of which backed up with chartbuster music, emerged blockbusters at the box office and were among the top five highest-grossing films of the year. Apart from commercial projects, Kher also collaborated with Mahesh Bhatt for the art-house television film Daddy, which like their previous collaboration Saaransh met with immense acclaim and won Kher his first National Film Award – Special Jury Award as well as Filmfare Award for Best Actor (Critics). The following year, he starred in Indra Kumar's blockbuster romantic comedy Dil, which had Aamir Khan and Madhuri Dixit in the lead roles. For his performance of a greedy father in Dil, Kher received his third nomination in the Filmfare Award for Best Supporting Actor category. In 1991, he appeared in highly successful films, including Saudagar, Saathi, Hum and Dil Hai Ke Manta Nahin. He also collaborated with Yash Chopra for the romantic drama Lamhe, which was a commercial failure, but received positive reception from critics and is now considered a cult classic. Kher's performances in Saudagar and Lamhe earned him nomination in the Filmfare Award for Best Supporting Actor category.

His other box office hits of this period, include Beta (1992), Shola Aur Shabnam (1992), Lootere (1993), Waqt Hamara Hai (1993), Khalnayak (1993), Hum Hain Kamaal Ke (1993), Gumrah (1993) and Darr (1993). He then appeared in Sooraj Barjatya's Hum Aapke Hain Koun..! (1994) and Aditya Chopra's Dilwale Dulhania Le Jayenge (1995). Both the films did extremely well at the box office and emerged All Time Blockbusters as well as the highest and second highest-grossing film of all time, respectively. For his performance in the former, Kher received another nomination in the Filmfare Award for Best Supporting Actor category. In the late-1990s, he continued to play supporting roles commercially successful ventures, such as Judwaa (1997), Ziddi (1997), Deewana Mastana (1997), Kuch Kuch Hota Hai (1998), Bade Miyan Chote Miyan (1998), Hum Aapke Dil Mein Rehte Hain (1999) and Haseena Maan Jaayegi (1999).

Kher began the new decade playing an antagonist in Rakesh Roshan's romantic blockbuster Kaho Naa... Pyaar Hai which made Hrithik Roshan a star. He followed it with four more major successes the same year with Dulhan Hum Le Jayenge, Kya Kehna, Hamara Dil Aapke Paas Hai and Mohabbatein. In 2001, he had another hit in Jodi No.1 and received praise for his performance in Rehnaa Hai Terre Dil Mein, which did not do well commercially, but went on to attain cult status in later years.

=== Expansion to Hollywood and further acclaim (2002–2018) ===
In 2002, Kher starred in his first Hollywood project which was Gurinder Chadha's sports comedy drama Bend It Like Beckham. The film proved to be a critical and commercial success grossing around $76.6 million worldwide. A year later, he reunited with Chadha for Bride and Prejudice, which too was a successful venture. His final collaboration with Chadha took place in 2005 for The Mistress of Spices, which had Aishwarya Rai and Dylan McDermott in the lead and unlike their previous ventures was panned by critics and did not do well.

During this period, Kher continued to star in notable Hindi films, such as Veer-Zaara (2004), Kyaa Kool Hain Hum (2005) and received immense acclaim and his second National Film Award – Special Jury Award for the 2005 film Maine Gandhi Ko Nahin Mara (which he also produced). In the latter-half of the 2000s, he appeared in critically and commercially successful Bollywood films, including Rang De Basanti (2006), Chup Chup Ke (2006), Vivah (2006), Khosla Ka Ghosla (2006), Apna Sapna Money Money (2006), A Wednesday! (2008), Wake Up Sid (2009) and made his Chinese film debut with Lust, Caution (2007), which too was a box office hit grossing around $67.1 million.

In the following decade, Kher did films of varied genres and found box office success in Dabangg (2010), Yamla Pagla Deewana (2011), Kya Super Kool Hain Hum (2012), Chashme Baddoor (2013), Singham Returns (2014), Prem Ratan Dhan Payo (2015), M.S. Dhoni: The Untold Story (2016), Toilet: Ek Prem Katha (2017) and Judwaa 2 (2017). He also received praise for his performances in Special 26 (2013), Baby (2015), Indu Sarkar (2017) and Love Sonia (2018). For Special 26, he received a nomination in the Best Supporting Actor category at 59th Filmfare Awards. During this period, he also made his Malayalam film debut with Blessy's Pranayam (2011), played supporting roles in blockbuster Hollywood ventures, including David O. Russell's Silver Linings Playbook (2012) and Michael Showalter's The Big Sick (2017) and received a nomination in the BAFTA Best Supporting Actor category for his performance in Lynsey Miller's The Boy With The Topknot (2017).

=== Work in regional industries and continued success (2019–present) ===
In 2019, Kher played the role of former PM Manmohan Singh in The Accidental Prime Minister and a vigilante in One Day: Justice Delivered, both of which were critical and commercial failures. After a gap of almost 3 years, he returned to the big screen playing one of the leads in Vivek Agnihotri's The Kashmir Files (2022). It received polarising response from critics, but proved to be a huge blockbuster and got Kher a nomination in the Best Actor category at 68th Filmfare Awards. The same year he appeared in the Telugu film Karthikeya 2, which also emerged a blockbuster at the box office.

In 2023, he appeared in the successful Malayalam comedy Voice of Sathyanathan and Kannada actioner Ghost, which too did well. This was followed by a series of box office duds like Shiv Shastri Balboa (2023), IB71 (2023), The Vaccine War (2023), Emergency (2025) and Tumko Meri Kasam (2025) with the exception being Anurag Basu's romantic musical Metro In Dino (2025) for which Kher also made his playback debut.

== Other works ==
Kher ventured into directing with Om Jai Jagadish (2002) and has been a producer. He produced and starred in the film Maine Gandhi Ko Nahin Mara (2005). From October 2003 to October 2004, he served as chairman of the Indian Film Censor Board.

In 2011 Kher released his first book The Best Thing About You is You!, which was a best-seller. His biography Lessons Life Taught Me Unknowingly was published on 5 August 2019 by Penguin Random House. In 2020, he wrote Your Best Day Is Today!, based on his experiences of the COVID-19 crisis. Remembering his father on his 9th death anniversary, he presented a poem written by Lucknow-based poet Pankaj Prasun and posted it on social media.

Kher hosted TV shows such as Say Na Something To Anupam Uncle, Sawaal Dus Crore Ka and Lead India. In 2014, Kher has written and starred in a play about his own life called Kucch Bhi Ho Sakta Hai, which was directed by Feroz Abbas Khan. In 2016, Anupam Kher was a narrator in the ABP News documentary TV series Bharatvarsh, which showcased the journey from ancient India to the 19th century. In late 2016, Anupam Kher produced Khwaabon Ki Zamin Par, a TV drama airing on Zindagi.

Starting in fall of 2018, Anupam Kher starred in NBC medical drama TV series New Amsterdam as Dr. Vijay Kapoor (a neurologist). He also appeared as Shahbaz Karim in the BBC1 drama Mrs Wilson. Kher is the founder of Actor Prepares, an acting institute based in Mumbai.

== Personal life ==
Kher married actress Madhumati Kapoor in 1979, but divorced after a few years. In 1985, he married actress Kirron Kher who is a Member of Parliament from Chandigarh, belonging to the BJP. Her son, his stepson, is actor Sikandar Kher. In 2010, he was appointed as the goodwill ambassador of the Pratham Education Foundation, which strives to improve children's education in India. Kher is an ardent supporter of the Bharatiya Janata Party (BJP) and Indian prime minister Narendra Modi.

On 20 September 2021, Kher was awarded an honorary doctorate degree in Philosophy of Hindu Studies by the Hindu University of America.
