= Insaaf Ki Awaaz =

1986 film by D. Ramanaidu

- Movie poster
- Directed by: B. Gopal
- Produced by: D. Rama Naidu
- Starring: Rekha; Anil Kapoor; Richa Sharma; Raj Babbar
- Music by: Bappi Lahiri
- Production company: Suresh Productions
- Release date: 14 November 1986
- Country: India
- Language: Hindi

Insaaf Ki Awaaz (transl. The Voice of Justice) is a 1986 Indian Hindi-language action film directed by B. Gopal and produced by D. Rama Naidu under the banner of Suresh Productions. It stars Rekha, Anil Kapoor, Richa Sharma, and Raj Babbar. The music director of the film was Bappi Lahiri. The film was a remake of Telugu film Pratidhwani (1986), also directed by B. Gopal.

== Cast ==
- Rekha as Inspector Jhansi Rani
- Anil Kapoor as Ravi Kumar
- Richa Sharma as Renu
- Raj Babbar as Chandrashekhar Azaad
- Kader Khan as Chaurangilal Domukhiya
- Anupam Kher as Kailashnath
- Roopesh Kumar as Mahendranath
- Gulshan Grover as Vikram Domukhiya
- Tej Sapru as Harinath
- Shafi Inamdar as Sanyasi Raja
- Pallavi Joshi as Jyoti Azaad
- Nilu Phule as Balwant Azaad
- Sushma Seth as Mrs Balwant Azaad
- Asrani as Murli
- Jagdeep as Constable Kanhaiya
- Parikshit Sahni as Police Commissioner Siddharth Sinha
- Mohan Choti as Shankar
- Manmohan Krishna as Judge Narang
- Surya as Vikram's friend

== Music ==
The music was composed by Bappi Lahiri, while the lyrics were penned by Indeevar.

=== Songs ===
| Song | Singer |
|---|---|
| "Insaaf Ki Awaaz"-1 | Kishore Kumar |
| "Insaaf Ki Awaaz"-2 | Kishore Kumar |
| "Radha Pyar De" | Kishore Kumar, S. Janaki |
| "Pyar Pyar Pyar" | Mohammed Aziz, S. Janaki |
| "Love in the Rain" | Bappi Lahiri, S. Janaki |
| "Koi Bhi Na Kaam Adhura Karo" | S. P. Balasubrahmanyam, Lata Mangeshkar |
