= The Boy with the Topknot =

- Written by: Mick Ford; Sathnam Sanghera
- Directed by: Lynsey Miller
- Starring: Sacha Dhawan; Joanna Vanderham
- Music by: Natalie Holt
- Country of origin: United Kingdom
- Original language: English

Production
- Producer: Nisha Parti
- Cinematography: Adam Etherington
- Editor: Sarah Brewerton
- Running time: 90 minutes
- Production companies: Kudos; Parti Productions; BBC; Mancana Productions

Original release
- Network: BBC
- Release: 8 November 2017

The Boy with the Topknot is a 2017 British romantic drama film starring Sacha Dhawan and Joanna Vanderham. The film is based on Sathnam Sanghera's memoir of the same name. The film premiered on BBC. The film is about a Sikh man who brings his English girlfriend home.

== Cast ==
- Sacha Dhawan as Sathnam
  - Himmut Singh Dhatt as young Sathnam, the boy with the topknot
- Joanna Vanderham as Laura
- Deepti Naval as Sathnam's mother
  - Kiran Sonia Sawar as young Sathnam's mother
- Anupam Kher as Sathnam's father
  - Sam Otto as young Sathnam's father
- Jaz Deol as Rajah
- Anjli Mohindra as Bindi
- Shaheen Khan as Aunt Sharanjit
  - Manpreet Bambra as young Aunt Sharanjit
- Dinita Gohil as Kiran Chahal
- Sharon Duncan-Brewster as Carol
- Aaron Thiara as Hardip

== Release ==
The Guardian gave the film a rating of three out of five stars and wrote that "This adaptation of Sathnam Sanghera’s memoir of growing up Sikh in the 60s is brave and funny ... but romantic additions detract from the love letter to a family". The Telegraph gave the film the same rating.

== Awards and nominations ==
Year	Award	Category	Nominee	Result	Ref.
2018	British Academy Television Awards	Best Supporting Actor	Anupam Kher	Nominated	
2018	Diversify TV Excellence Awards	Best Race and Ethnicity Scripted Series	The Boy With The Top Knot	Won	
