= Neeraj Pandey =

Indian film director

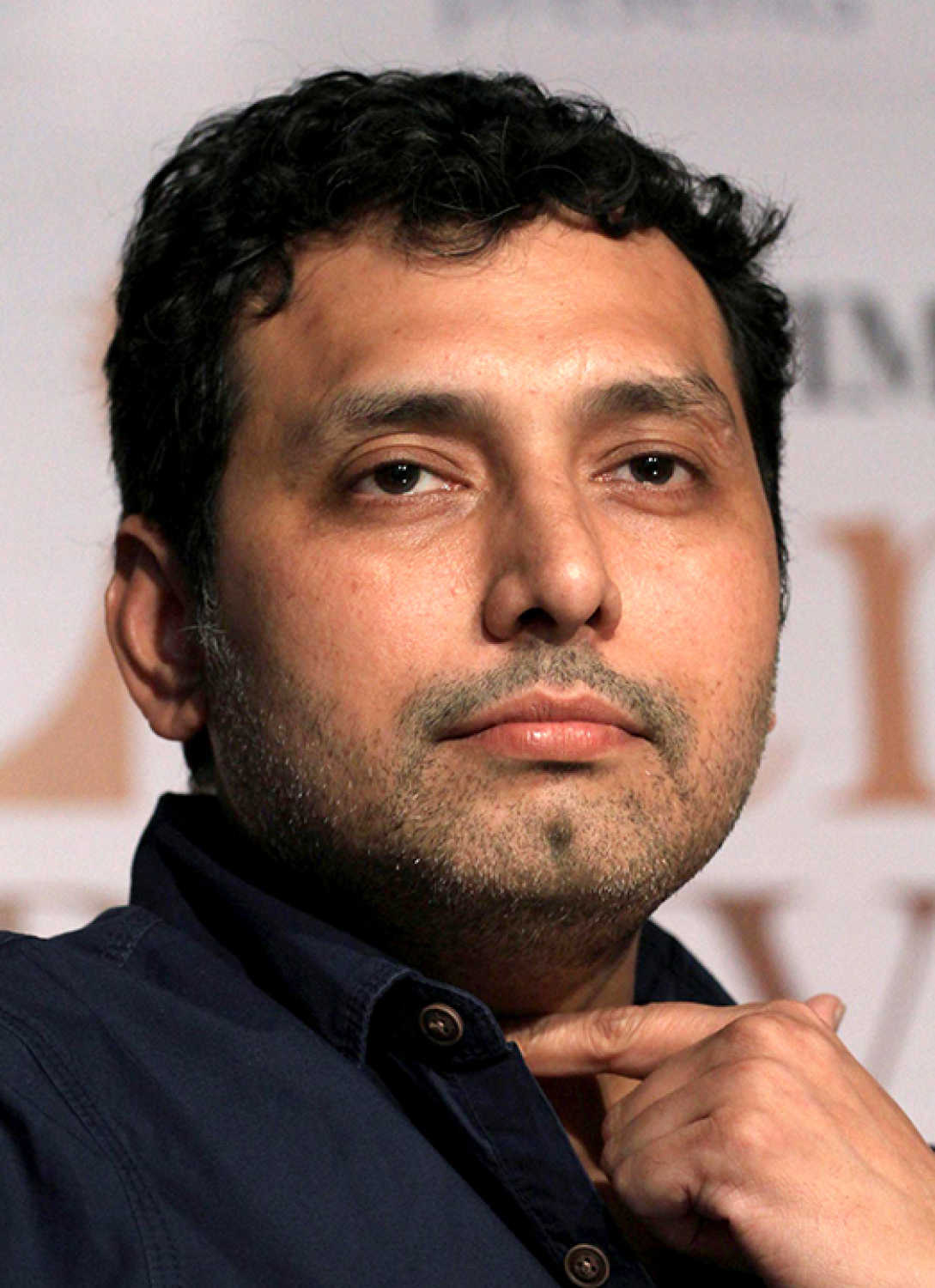
- Pandey in 2020
- Born: 17 December 1973 (age 52); Howrah, West Bengal, India
- Occupations: Director; writer; producer
- Years active: 2008-present
- Organization: Friday Filmworks
- Notable work: A Wednesday; Special 26; Baby; M.S. Dhoni: The Untold Story; Special Ops

Neeraj Pandey (born 17 December 1973) is an Indian film director, producer, screenwriter and novelist. He is known for directing and creating thriller, espionage and crime-based films and OTT series and movies including A Wednesday!, Special 26, Baby, M.S. Dhoni: The Untold Story , the Special Ops franchise, The Freelancer, the Khakee franchise and Taskaree. He is the co-founder of Friday Filmworks and Friday Storytellers.

== Early life and education ==
Pandey was born and raised in Howrah, West Bengal. His father, originally from Arrah, Bihar, worked for Bosch in Kolkata. He attended St. Aloysius High School, Howrah, before completing his higher secondary education from St. Thomas' High School, Dasnagar, Howrah. He moved to New Delhi, where he graduated in English from Sri Aurobindo College, University of New Delhi.

== Career ==
Pandey began his career in media and entertainment with 'Legacy Entertainment' in New Delhi, a company started by the Dalmia Group to make television programs. In 2000, he moved to Mumbai, where he worked on documentaries, advertising, films and television productions.

Along with producer Shital Bhatia, he co-founded Quarter Inch Productions, which produced television programmes, documentaries and television films. The collaboration laid the foundation for their long-term creative partnership. In 2008, Pandey and Bhatia established Friday Filmworks, a Mumbai-based production company.

Under the Friday Filmworks banner, Pandey made his directorial debut with A Wednesday! (2008), a thriller that received critical acclaim and established him as a filmmaker. He followed it with Special 26 (2013), a crime thriller inspired by the 1987 Opera House heist, and Baby (2015), an espionage thriller. In 2016, Pandey directed M.S. Dhoni: The Untold Story, a biographical sports drama based on the life of Indian cricketer Mahendra Singh Dhoni. The film became one of the most commercially successful Indian biographical films.

Apart from directing, Pandey has produced films including Taryanche Bait (2011), The Royal Bengal Tiger (2014), Total Siyapaa (2014) and Saat Uchakkey (2016).

In 2016, Anil Ambani-owned Reliance Entertainment announced a joint venture with Neeraj Pandey and Friday Filmworks to form Plan C studios for production of films. Akshay Kumar starrer Rustom was the first film under this banner and followed by Naam Shabana (2017). In 2017, he also co-produced Toilet- Ek Prem Katha, a satirical take on the open defecation scenario in India went on to become a critically acclaimed movie.

He also directed Ouch, a short film which was nominated for the Filmfare Short Film Award 2017.

In 2018, Pandey directed Aiyaary, an action thriller based on true incidents, a theme seen in several of his previous films as well and Operation Romeo (film) in 2022.

In 2019, Pandey co-founded Friday Storytellers, the digital content division of Friday Filmworks, focused on developing original content for digital platforms.

In 2020, he created and directed Special Ops on Disney+ Hotstar, an eight episode espionage thriller series, that marked his entry into the long-form streaming content. The success of the series led to the spin-off Special Ops 1.5: The Himmat Story (2021) on Disney+ Hotstar.

Under Friday Storytellers, Pandey expanded his work in digital entertainment through projects including , Khakee: The Bihar Chapter (2022) on Netflix, The Freelancer (2023) on Disney+ Hotstar, Sikandar Ka Muqaddar (2024), a heist thriller on Netflix, Khakee: The Bengal Chapter (2025) on Netflix, 'Special Ops2 (2025) on Disney+ Hotstar, and Taskaree (2026) on Netflix.Taskaree made history as the first Indian show to debut at number one on Netflix's global top-10 non-English TV list.

In 2022, Pandey co-founded Boot Room Sports Media LLP with Shital Bhatia and Sudip Tewari. The company has produced sports-focused content including Kaun Pravin Tambe? based on the life of cricketer Pravin Tambe and Bandon Mein Tha Dum!, a documentary series chronicling India's 2020–21 Border-Gavaskar Trophy victory in Australia for VOOT.

In partnership with Discovery Plus, he also expanded into non-fiction with a slate of historical documentaries and created Secrets of Sinauli, Secrets of the Kohinoor, and Secrets of the Buddha Relics, all hosted by Manoj Bajpayee as part of the 'Secrets' franchise.

In 2024 he written and directed Auron Mein Kahan Dum Tha. starring Ajay Devgn and Tabu (actress).

Neeraj Pandey has also written his debut novel titled Ghalib Danger which was launched on 6 December 2013.

== Filmography ==
=== Films ===
Year	Title	Director	Producer	Writer
2008	A Wednesday	Yes	Yes	Yes
2011	Taryanche Bait		Yes	
2013	Special 26	Yes		Yes
2014	The Royal Bengal Tiger		Yes	Yes
2014	Total Siyapaa		Yes	Yes
2015	Baby	Yes		Yes
2016	Rustom		Yes	
2016	M.S. Dhoni: The Untold Story	Yes		Yes
2016	Saat Uchakkey		Yes	
2017	Naam Shabana		Yes	Yes
2017	Toilet: Ek Prem Katha		Yes	
2018	Aiyaary	Yes	Yes	Yes
2018	Missing		Yes	
2022	Operation Romeo		Yes	
2022	Vikram Vedha		Yes	
2023	Chengiz			Yes
2024	Auron Mein Kahan Dum Tha	Yes	Yes	Yes
2024	Sikandar Ka Muqaddar	Yes		Yes

=== Series ===
Year	Title	Creator	Director	Producer	Writer
2020	Special OPS	Yes	Yes	Yes	Yes
2021	Special Ops 1.5: The Himmat Story	Yes	Yes	Yes	Yes
2022	Khakee: The Bihar Chapter	Yes			Yes
2023	The Freelancer	Yes			Yes
2025	Khakee: The Bengal Chapter	Yes			Yes
2026	Taskaree	Yes	Yes		Yes

=== Documentaries ===
Year	Title	Platform	Creator	Director	Producer	Writer
2021	Secrets of Sinauli	Discovery+			Yes	
2022	Secrets of the Koh-i-noor	Discovery+	Yes			
2022	Bandon Mein Tha Dum!	Jio Cinema		Yes		
2024	Secrets of The Buddha Relics	Discovery+	Yes			

== Awards and nominations ==
Film	Award name	Year	Status	Ref.
A Wednesday!	National Film Awards - Best First Film of a Director	2008	Won	
A Wednesday!	54th Filmfare Awards - Best Director	2009	Nominated	
A Wednesday!	Star Screen Awards - Best Film, Best Story, Best Director, Most Promising Debut Director	2009	Won	
A Wednesday!	Star Screen Awards - Best Screenplay, Best Dialogue	2009	Nominated	
A Wednesday!	IIFA Awards - Best Story. Best Dialogue	2009	Won	
Rustom	Zee Cine Awards - Best Film	2017	Nominated	
Rustom	Stardust Awards - Best Film of the Year	2017	Nominated	
Special OPS	Filmfare OTT Awards - Best Director	2020	Nominated	

== Bibliography ==
- Ghalib Danger (2013)
