= Khel (1992 film) =

- Movie Poster
- Directed by: Rakesh Roshan
- Written by: Javed Akhtar (story, screenplay, dialogue, lyrics)
- Produced by: Sujit Kumar; Kiran Singh; R. A. Singh
- Starring: Mala Sinha; Anil Kapoor; Madhuri Dixit; Sonu Walia; Anupam Kher
- Cinematography: Pushpal Dutta
- Edited by: Sanjay Verma
- Music by: Rajesh Roshan
- Distributed by: Shiv Bhakti Films
- Release date: 14 August 1992
- Country: India
- Language: Hindi

Khel (transl. Game) is a 1992 Indian Hindi language romantic comedy film directed by Rakesh Roshan. It stars Mala Sinha, Anil Kapoor, Madhuri Dixit, Sonu Walia, Anupam Kher as main cast. Khel is heavily inspired by the 1989 Hollywood comedy Dirty Rotten Scoundrels. It marked the eleventh consecutive film between lead pair Anil Kapoor and Madhuri Dixit. It was remade in Pakistan as Munda Bigra Jaye (1995)

== Synopsis ==
A rich widow Sulakshana Devi lives with her son Ravi and care-taker Balwant. One day, she receives the news that her son has died in a car accident. Meanwhile, a lady named Kamini approaches her and informs her that she is carrying her dead son Ravi's, child. Sulakshana does not believe Kamini and turns her away. Sulakshana later learns from Ravi's friend Sanjay Gupta that Kamini is indeed the mother of Ravi's child. Sulakshana tries her best to look for Kamini and get her home but to no avail.

Years later, Sulakshana comes across a young man Arun who retrieves her purse from a thief. Happy with his honesty, Sulakshana offers Arun a job. Little does she know that Arun is, in fact, a crook with his eyes and heart set on her multi-crore property.

While Arun gets busy hatching plots to seize her property, Seema and her uncle enter the scene. Then follows a series of comic events and a love triangle between Arun, Seema and Tara Jaisingh.

It is revealed that Ravi's death was not an accident in the first place. What is the truth that awaits Sulakshana?

== Cast ==
- Mala Sinha as Sulakshana
- Anil Kapoor as Arun / Devdas
- Madhuri Dixit as Seema
- Sonu Walia as Tara Jaisingh
- Bharati as Kamini / Sharda
- Anupam Kher as Seema's Uncle
- Prem Chopra as Balwant
- Sujit Kumar as Father / Principal
- Vijayendra Ghatge as Ravi
- Dinesh Hingoo as Hasmukh
- Satyendra Kapoor as Mr. Sinha
- Satish Kaul as Vinod Mishra
- Aparajita as Shanti Mishra
- Bharat Kapoor as Vinod's Elder Brother
- Yunus Parvez as Seth Mangatram

== Soundtrack ==
Song	Singer
"Ek Baat Maan Lo Tum"-1	Asha Bhosle
"Ek Baat Maan Lo Tum"-2	Asha Bhosle
"Khat Likhna Hai Par Sochti Hoon"	Lata Mangeshkar; Mohammed Aziz
"Soone Shaam Savere"	Amit Kumar
"Na Hai Zameen, Na Aasman, Laye Kahan Ho"	Amit Kumar; Sadhana Sargam
"Zindagi Ke Khel Mein Kaun Yeh Jaane"	Kumar Sanu; Alka Yagnik

== Awards ==
- Filmafare Award for Best Comedian - Anupam Kher
