= A Wednesday! =

2008 Indian film by Neeraj Pandey

A Wednesday
- Theatrical release poster
- Directed by: Neeraj Pandey
- Written by: Neeraj Pandey
- Produced by: Ronnie Screwvala; Shital Bhatia; Anjum Rizvi
- Starring: Naseeruddin Shah; Anupam Kher; Aamir Bashir; Jimmy Shergill
- Cinematography: Fuwad Khan
- Edited by: Shree Narayan Singh
- Music by: Sanjoy Chowdhury
- Production companies: Friday Filmworks; Anjum Rizvi Film Company
- Distributed by: UTV Motion Pictures
- Release date: 5 September 2008
- Running time: 99 minutes
- Country: India
- Language: Hindi
- Box office: ₹12 crore

A Wednesday! is a 2008 Indian Hindi-language thriller film written and directed by Neeraj Pandey and produced by Ronnie Screwvala, Anjum Rizvi and Shital Bhatia under UTV Motion Pictures and Friday Filmworks. The film stars Naseeruddin Shah and Anupam Kher in the lead roles. The film depicts a confrontation between a police commissioner and an anonymous caller who threatens to detonate bombs throughout Mumbai if four terrorists are not freed from police custody.

Released on 5 September 2008, it received widespread critical acclaim and emerged as a commercial success. It was also granted tax exemption in the state of Maharashtra. Subsequently, it won a number of awards including the Indira Gandhi Award for Best Debut Film of a Director at the 56th National Film Awards. It went on to be remade in Tamil and Telugu simultaneously as Unnaipol Oruvan and Eenadu (both 2009), and as an English-language Sri Lankan film A Common Man (2013).

== Plot ==
Mumbai police commissioner Prakash Rathod describes in a voiceover that he is going to retire the following day. He goes on to describe the most challenging case he has faced in his career.

An unnamed man carries a travel bag, assumed to contain explosives, in the Chatrapati Shivaji Terminus railway station and proceeds to hide the bag in the restroom of a police station opposite the Mumbai Police headquarters. He then goes to the rooftop of a building under construction, where he sets up his base of operations, equipped with SIM cards, mobile phones, and other gadgets. He calls Rathod and informs him that he has placed five bombs in locations throughout Mumbai and has programmed them to explode simultaneously within four hours unless the Commissioner gives in to his demands and releases four terrorists. Rathod alerts his team to trace the location of the caller. The caller tips off television news reporter Naina Roy, telling her it is going to be "the most important day of her life."

The four terrorists demanded by the caller are rounded up by police officers Arif and Jai. Police depute a young hacker named Anuj to track the location of the caller. The caller asks the two police officers to leave the four militants near a bench on a Juhu Aviation Base runway, but Arif leaves only three behind and takes one of them, Ibrahim Khan, captive as he suspects that the caller would not reveal the locations of the bombs even after the militants are released.

A phone placed under the bench rings, and an explosion occurs, killing the three terrorists, and stunning Jai and Arif. The anonymous caller reveals he does not belong to any terrorist organization, and his plan was not to free the terrorists but to kill them. The caller, being just a "stupid common man wanting to clean his house," sought to avenge the terrorist attacks they had helped carry out in major cities in India, specifically the 2006 Mumbai train bombings, while also criticizing the incompetence of authorities. His final demand is that the officers kill Ibrahim themselves, or he will set off all five bombs in Mumbai. Rathod indirectly orders Arif and Jai to kill Ibrahim and make it look like it was done in self-defense.

After the death of Ibrahim is confirmed on the news, the caller calls Rathod for the final time to reveal that he has not planted any other bombs in the city. Rathod declares he already knew there were no more bombs; hence, his decision to kill the last terrorist was not taken in fear but in confidence. Rathod reaches the caller's location just as the caller is leaving, having destroyed all his equipment. The two meet briefly when Rathod, identifying the caller on the basis of a face sketch, offers the man a ride home.

In a voiceover, Rathod says the man told him his real name, but he does not wish to reveal it since doing so would give away the man's religion. Rathod admits that he knew the caller was disturbed because of the incompetence of the governing authorities, but he never imagined a common man would go to such lengths to achieve this end. He also notes that the facts of this incident cannot be found in any written record but only in the memories of those who actually witnessed it, and further acknowledges that although the incident has ambiguous moral significance, he feels that whatever happened, happened for the best.

== Cast ==
- Naseeruddin Shah as The Common Man
- Anupam Kher as Prakash Rathod, Commissioner of Mumbai Police
- Jimmy Sheirgill as Inspector Arif Khan, Anti-Terrorism Squad (ATS)
- Aamir Bashir as Inspector Jai Singh, ATS
- Deepal Shaw as Naina Roy, a UTV journalist
- Parag Tyagi as Inspector Aakash Duraivanshi
- Chetan Pandit as Chief Minister Sunil Nigvekar
- Rajendra Chawla as Jaishankar Tiwary, Chief Minister's PA
- Snehal Dabi as Sambu "Electric Baba"
- Alok Narula as Raj Sharma, Naina's cameraman
- Virendra Saxena as Babu Patil, Officer-in-Charge, Colaba Police Station
- Gaurav Kapur as Arjun Khanna
- Kali Prasad Mukherjee as Ibrahim Khan, a terrorist
- Rohitashv Gour as Ikhlaque Ahmed, a terrorist
- Vije Bhatia as Mohd. Zaheer, a terrorist
- Mukesh Bhatt as Khurshid Lala, a terrorist
- Vicky Ahuja as a middleman who supplies RDX supplier

== Soundtrack ==
The soundtrack composed by Sanjoy Chowdhury features 6 songs, neither of which were featured in the film

- "Theme Song" - Instrumental
- "Bekali" - Javed Ali
- "Bulleh Shah" - Tochi Raina
- "Bulleh Shah - Remix" - Tochi Raina
- "Jalwa" - Shaan
- "Nazar Lage Na" - Shaan, Mahalakshmi Iyer
- "Parwazen" - Shaan

== Production ==
From casting to completion, A Wednesday! took about eight months. It was filmed on location around Mumbai in 28 days. The terrorist's 'workstation' was an actual under-construction 25-storey building; it was chosen from 50 other such buildings for its clear view of the Mumbai skyline. Since the building had no elevators, a trolley lift was installed; Shah walked up the 25 floors every day. Shah mentioned in an interview that it was the first film of his career where he did not change a single word. He was first offered Kher's role.

Though a work of fiction, the script was inspired by the 11 July 2006 Mumbai train bombings. In fact, the incidents that followed the bombings were used as details in the plot.

=== Casting ===
Anupam Kher and Naseeruddin Shah were Pandey's first choices for the two principal characters. After both actors the roles, he approached the producer Anjum Rizvi who liked the subject and the casting. Meanwhile, UTV Motion Pictures heard of the project, took it on, and bought the film's rights from Rizvi and Pandey.

== Release ==
The release was delayed because UTV's own production, Mumbai Meri Jaan (2008), also based on the Mumbai train serial blasts, was scheduled for an August release. A Wednesday! was released in September alongside Hijack and Santosh Sivan's Tahaan.

== Reception ==
A Wednesday! received critical acclaim with many comparing it to the movies of the Die Hard series. In a Tehelka review, while commending Neeraj Pandey for a tightly scripted film, "red herrings, finely etched characters", also noted "(for the film), the real Anupam Kher, whom we met in Saaransh, and the real Naseeruddin Shah, whom we knew from Bazaar and Mandi and Sparsh, both show up." The Times of India's critic Nikhat Kazmi called the movie "an intelligent diatribe against terrorism, refreshingly packaged as a racy thriller, reminiscent of the Die Hard Series."

Noted critic Rajeev Masand of CNN-IBN gave 4 out of 5 stars, and a positive review saying, "It's difficult to explain just how good A Wednesday is without giving away too much about the film. Because believe me, it's a film best seen without any impressions. It's a film whose charm lies in its unraveling". The Economic Times's critic, Gaurav Malani, wrote, "A Wednesday is one of those rare variety films about which one can't discuss much despite a strong desire for it could hamper your viewing experience as an unappraised audience. It's a film one wants to rave liberally about but even then you can't conveniently converse on the instances of acclaim since those are the moments of surreptitious surprise held in reserve by the director. It's the kind of film that is discussed in detail once it acquires the cult status." He also gave it 4 stars out of 5. Rony D'Costa of Box Office India gave it 3 stars out of 5, stating "it will take just 100 minutes of your time but will give you an exciting & enriching movie going experience. A good watch, any day of the week."

Anupama Chopra of NDTV thought the film to be a "provocative theatre. Its message is urgent and relevant but also disturbing and dangerous." She also felt what it suggested was "implausible".

== Box office ==
A Wednesday! grossed around Rs 120 million in India. The film had a distributor share of Rs 44.6 million in India. It proved profitable for producers, distributors, and exhibitors.

== Awards and nominations ==
Year	Award	Category	Nominee	Status	Ref
2008	56th National Film Awards	Best Debut Film of a Director	Neeraj Pandey	Won	
2009	54th Filmfare Awards	Best Director	Neeraj Pandey	Nominated	
2009	54th Filmfare Awards	Best Actor	Naseeruddin Shah	Nominated	
2009	Screen Awards	Best Film	Ronnie Screwvala, Shital Bhatia, Anjum Rizvi	Nominated	
2009	Screen Awards	Best Director	Neeraj Pandey	Won	
2009	Screen Awards	Best Story	Neeraj Pandey	Won	
2009	Screen Awards	Most Promising Debut Director	Neeraj Pandey	Won	
2009	Screen Awards	Best Actor	Naseeruddin Shah	Nominated	
2009	Screen Awards	Best Supporting Actor	Anupam Kher	Nominated	
2009	Screen Awards	Best Background Music	Sanjoy Chowdhury	Nominated	
2009	Screen Awards	Best Editing	Shree Narayan Singh	Nominated	
2009	Screen Awards	Best Screenplay	Neeraj Pandey	Nominated	
2009	Screen Awards	Best Dialogue	Neeraj Pandey	Nominated	
2009	Screen Awards	Best Sound Designing	Rakesh Ranjan	Nominated	
2009	Screen Awards	Best Art Director	Sunil Nigvekar	Nominated	
2009	3rd Asia Pacific Screen Awards	Best Actor	Naseeruddin Shah	Nominated	

== Remakes ==
The film was remade into Tamil and Telugu. The Tamil version had Mohanlal and Kamal Haasan in lead roles, while the Telugu version had Kamal Haasan and Venkatesh in the lead.

UTV sold the rights of the film to Asia Media and Gemini Media, which remade it into A Common Man, starring Ben Kingsley and Ben Cross.
