= Ramratan =

Ram Ratan
- Directed by: Govind Sakariya
- Written by: Praful Parekh
- Screenplay by: Govind Sakariya
- Produced by: Sanjay Patel; Ashwin Patel; Bharat Dodiya
- Starring: See below
- Music by: Bappi lahiri
- Production company: Sab Star Movies
- Release date: 3 November 2017
- Country: India
- Language: Hindi

Ram Ratan is a Bollywood romantic comedy film, written by Praful Parekh and directed by Govind Sakariya and produced by Sanjay Patel, Ashwin Patel and Bharat Dodiya, under the banner of Sab Star Movies.

Rishi Bhutani and Daisy Shah will be seen playing lead roles in the film. While Hitler Didi fame Sumit Vats played the role of Happy Singh, protagonists best friend.

== Plot ==
The director of the film Sakariya, said that the film is a romance with a pinch of comedy and thrill.

== Cast ==
- Rishi Bhutani as Ram Rathod
- Daisy Shah as Ratan Rathod
- Kangna Sharma
- Yamini Joshi
- Sumit Vats as Happy Singh
- Kavya Kiran as Sweety
- Mahesh Thakur as Mahendra Rathod, Ram's father
- Sudha Chandran as Mrs. Rathod, Ram's mother
- Rajpal Yadav as Chhota Tiger
- Yaachana Sharma
- Angela Krislinzki as Amy
- Arvie Gupta
- Angel Thakur
- Roshni Rajput
- Satish Kaushik as Goli bhai
- Prashant Rajput
- Amit Dimri

== Production ==
=== Development ===
The official announcement of the film was announced in the first half of September 2016. The title of the film was said to be Ramratan.

=== Casting ===
The makers of the film have decided to cast Rishi Bhutani and Daisy Shah as lead roles along with Mahesh Thakur, Sudha Chandran, Rajpal Yadav, Angy sharma, Sumit Vats, Rituu Sachdev, Angela Krislinzki, Arvie Gupta, Angel Thakur, Roshni Rajput, Satish Kaushik and Amit Dimri as other roles in the film.

=== Filming ===
The principal photography of the film commenced on 10 September 2016.

== Soundtrack ==
All lyrics written by Deepak Sneh; all music composed by Bappi Lahiri.
No.	Title	Singer(s)	Length
1	Nand Lala	Palak Muchhal, Bappi Lahiri	6:10
2	Nagada Nagada	Bhumi Trivedi, Raja Hasan	5:51
3	Yeh Hai Dance Bar	Bappi Lahiri	5:26
4	Jal Jal Jal Rahi Hain Raatein	Mohammed Irfan, Sadhana Sargam	5:26
