= Screen Award for Best Female Playback =

Annual film award in India

Screen Award for Best Female Playback singer
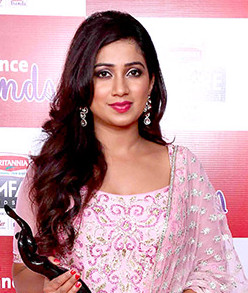
- The 2026 recipient: Shreya Ghoshal
- Awarded for: Award for Best Female Playback singer
- Country: India
- Presented by: Screen India
- First award: Lata Mangeshkar, Hum Aapke Hain Koun..! (1995)
- Currently held by: Shreya Ghoshal, Saiyaara (2026)

The Screen Award for Best Female Playback is chosen by a distinguished panel of judges from the Indian Bollywood film industry and the winners are announced in January.

== Superlatives ==
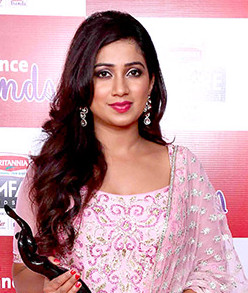
Shreya Ghoshal holds the record of maximum awards in this category, with eight wins. She also holds the record of maximum nominations in this category, with twenty-two nominations.

Superlative	Singer	Record
Most awards	Shreya Ghoshal	8
Most nominations	Shreya Ghoshal	22
Most awards in a decade	Shreya Ghoshal	3 (2000s, 2010s)
Most nominations in a year	Shreya Ghoshal	4 (2020)
Most consecutive awards	Shreya Ghoshal	2 (2011-2012)
Most consecutive nominations	Shreya Ghoshal	11 (2006-2014)

=== Most wins ===
Winner	Number of Wins	Years
Shreya Ghoshal	8	2004, 2006, 2008, 2011, 2012, 2014, 2020, 2026
Kavita Krishnamurthy	2	1997, 2000
Alka Yagnik	2	1996, 2001
Sunidhi Chauhan	2	2005, 2007

== List of nominations and winners ==
=== 1990s ===
Year	Singer	Song	Movie
1995
1995	Lata Mangeshkar	Mayi Ni Mayi	Hum Aapke Hain Koun..!
1996
1996	Alka Yagnik	Dil Ne Dil Se	Haqeeqat
1997
1997	Kavita Krishnamurthy	Aaj Main Upar	Khamoshi: The Musical
1998
1998	K. S. Chithra	Paayale Chhun Mun	Virasat
1999
1999	Jaspinder Narula	Pyaar To Hona Hi Tha	Pyaar To Hona Hi Tha

=== 2000s ===
Year	Singer	Song	Movie
2000
2000	Kavita Krishnamurthy	Hum Dil De Chuke Sanam	Hum Dil De Chuke Sanam
2001
2001	Alka Yagnik	Panchhi Nadiyan	Refugee
2002
2002	Asha Bhosle	Radha Kaise Na Jale	Lagaan
2003
2003	Sadhana Sargam	Chupke Se	Saathiya
2004
2004	Shreya Ghoshal	Jaadu Hai Nasha Hai	Jism
2005
2005	Sunidhi Chauhan	Sajna Ve Sajna	Chameli
2006
2006	Shreya Ghoshal	Piyu Bole	Parineeta
2007
2007	Sunidhi Chauhan	Beedi	Omkara
2007	Shreya Ghoshal	O Saathi Re	Omkara
2008
2008	Shreya Ghoshal	Barso Re	Guru
2008	Shreya Ghoshal	Yeh Ishq Haye	Jab We Met
2009
2009	Shilpa Rao	Khuda Jaane	Bachna Ae Haseeno
2009	Shreya Ghoshal	Teri Ore	Singh Is Kinng

=== 2010s ===
Year	Singer	Song	Movie
2010
2010	Kavita Seth	Iktara	Wake Up Sid
2010	Shreya Ghoshal	Zoobi Doobi	3 Idiots
2011
2011	Mamta Sharma	Munni Badnaam Hui	Dabangg
2011	Shreya Ghoshal	Bahara	I Hate Luv Storys
2011	Shreya Ghoshal	Noor-e-Khuda	My Name Is Khan
2012
2012	Shreya Ghoshal	Ooh Laa La	The Dirty Picture
2013
2013	Shalmali Kholgade	Pareshaan	Ishaqzaade
2013	Shreya Ghoshal	Radha	Student of the Year
2014
2014	Shreya Ghoshal	Sunn Raha Hai	Aashiqui 2
2014	Chinmayi Sripada	Titli	Chennai Express
2014	Monali Thakur	Sawaar Loon	Lootera
2014	Shalmali Kholgade	Balam Pichkari	Yeh Jawaani Hai Deewani
2014	Sona Mohapatra	Ambarsariya	Fukrey
2015
2015	Jyoti Nooran & Sultana Nooran	Pathaka Guddi	Highway
2015	Jasmine Sandlas	Yaar Na Miley	Kick
2015	Kanika Kapoor	Baby Doll	Ragini MMS 2
2015	Kanika Kapoor	Lovely	Happy New Year
2015	Rekha Bhardwaj	Hamari Atariya Pe	Dedh Ishqiya
2016
2016	Monali Thakur	Moh Moh Ke Dhaage	Dum Laga Ke Haisha
2017
2017	Palak Muchhal	Kaun Tujhe	M.S. Dhoni: The Untold Story
2018
2018	Shashaa Tirupati	Kanha	Shubh Mangal Saavdhan
2018	Shreya Ghoshal	Thodi Der	Half Girlfriend
2019
2019	Harshdeep Kaur	Chonch Ladhiyaan	Manmarziyaan
2019	Harshdeep Kaur	Dilbaro	Raazi
2019	Ronkini Gupta	Chaav Laaga	Sui Dhaaga
2019	Shreya Ghoshal	Ghoomar	Padmaavat

=== 2020s ===
Year	Singer	Song	Movie
2020
2020	Shreya Ghoshal	Ghar More Pardesiya	Kalank
2020	Vaishali Mhade	Ghar More Pardesiya	Kalank
2020	Antara Mitra	Dil Hi Toh Hai	The Sky Is Pink
2020	Pratibha Singh Patel	Rajaji	Manikarnika: The Queen of Jhansi
2020	Shilpa Rao	Ghungroo	War
2020	Shreya Ghoshal	Sapna Hai Sach Hai	Panipat
2020	Shreya Ghoshal	Tabaah Ho Gaye	Kalank
2020	Shreya Ghoshal	Yeh Aaina	Kabir Singh
2026
2026	Shreya Ghoshal	Saiyaara Title Track	Saiyaara
2026	Jasmine Sandlas	Shararat	Dhurandhar
2026	Madhubanti Bagchi	Shararat	Dhurandhar
2026	Shreya Ghoshal	Qayde Se	Metro… In Dino
2026	Shilpa Rao	Barbaad	Saiyaara
2026	Parampara Tandon	Humsafar	Saiyaara

== See also ==
- List of music awards honoring women
- Screen Awards
