= Jai Ho (film) =

2014 Indian film by Sohail Khan

- Theatrical release poster
- Directed by: Sohail Khan
- Written by: Dileep Shukla
- Story by: A. R. Murugadoss
- Based on: Stalin (2006) by A. R. Murugadoss
- Produced by: Sohail Khan; Kishore Lulla
- Starring: Salman Khan; Tabu; Daisy Shah; Danny Denzongpa; Sana Khan; Aditya Pancholi
- Cinematography: Santosh Thundiyil
- Edited by: Ashish Amrute
- Music by: Songs: Sajid–Wajid; Amaal Mallik; Devi Sri Prasad; Score: Sandeep Shirodkar
- Production company: Sohail Khan Productions
- Distributed by: Eros International
- Release date: 24 January 2014 (India)
- Running time: 142 minutes
- Country: India
- Language: Hindi
- Budget: ₹50 crore
- Box office: ₹195.04 crore

Jai Ho (transl. Let there be Victory) is a 2014 Indian Hindi-language political action drama film directed by Sohail Khan, who also produced the film under the banner Sohail Khan Productions and co-produced by Sunil Lulla under Eros International, which distributed the film. It is an official remake of the Telugu film Stalin, which is also inspired by the American-drama film Pay It Forward. The film stars Salman Khan, Tabu, Daisy Shah, Danny Denzongpa, Sana Khan and Aditya Pancholi, while Suniel Shetty and Genelia D'Souza make cameo appearances.

Jai Ho was released on 24 January 2014, during the Republic Day weekend, and received mixed reviews from critics. It became a commercial success grossing ₹195 crore (US$21 million) at the box office, becoming the sixth highest-grossing Bollywood film of 2014.

== Plot ==
Jai Agnihotri, a short-tempered INA Major, gets suspended after he ignores orders from his superiors by rescuing a group of children from terrorists. After this incident, Jai moves in with his mother and sister, Geeta. One day, Jai is unable to help Suman, a physically disabled girl, take an examination, while her brother is stuck in a traffic jam. A depressed Suman commits suicide. Jai gets disturbed by the incident, where he creates a help-three-people concept, which would encourage citizens to help each other and would foster kindness and a sense of community among the citizens. Each day, citizens are to help three people and these three people will in turn help three more people and so on.

On one occasion for one of his daily good deeds, Jai loses his temper and beats a rich man as he had injured a child beggar. In an act of revenge, the rich man calls some henchmen to kidnap Geeta and her friend Rinky. Jai saves Geeta and Rinky, but injures one of the captors in the process, who happens to be the henchman of MLA Patil, the son-in-law of Home Minister Dashrath Singh, who gets enraged about Jai injuring Patil's henchmen who is actually Manik. Dashrath tells Patil to avenge this injury by kidnapping Jai's nephew Kabir, but Jai kills Patil in the process. Meanwhile, CM Ashok Pradhan learns about Jai's help-three-people concept after his own life is saved by a schoolgirl. Ashok intervenes in the dispute between Dashrath and Jai in order to end their fight, but Dashrath does not appreciate it and attempts to kill Ashok.

However, Jai manages to save Ashok and admits him to the hospital. Dashrath, a journalist, spreads rumours that Jai attempted to assassinate Ashok. Meanwhile, Dashrath's son, Vijayant Singh, along with his henchmen, attacks Jai. In the ensuing confrontation, Jai kills Vijayant, along with the corrupt police officers Inspectors Dilip Kadam and Imran Siddiqui, with the assistance of SI Abhay Rajput. Jai suffers severe injuries after being stabbed by Patil's widow, Kavita. Tragically, Kavita is also stabbed and dies at the hands of Vijayant. A rickshaw driver, Babban, and Jai's former colleague, Arjun Kaul, team up to help Jai reach the hospital. While Jai is there, Ashok recovers and reveals Dashrath's involvement in the attempted murder. An enraged crowd beats Dashrath nearly to death upon hearing the truth. Jai eventually recovers and emerges from the hospital, where he finds thousands of people awaiting him. Jai thanks them all for embracing his vision of help.

== Cast ==
- Salman Khan as Major Jai Agnihotri
- Tabu as Geeta Agnihotri Khanna
- Daisy Shah as Rinky Shah
- Danny Dengzongpa as Home Minister Dashrath Singh
- Aditya Pancholi as Inspector Dilip Kadam
- Mahesh Manjrekar as Babban
- Sharad Kapoor as Inspector Imran Siddiqui
- Mukul Dev as Shrikant Patil
- Haroon Qazi as Vijayant Singh
- Nadira Babbar as Sulochna Agnihotri
- Pulkit Samrat as SI Abhay Rajput
- Mohnish Bahl as Chief Minister Ashok Pradhan
- Sana Khan as Kavita Singh Patil
- Resham Tipnis as Meghna Shah
- Ashmit Patel as Sumit Mohile
- Yash Tonk as Babu
- Mahesh Thakur as Rehaan Khanna
- Naman Jain as Kabir Khanna
- Tulip Joshi as Anjali D’Souza
- Varun Badola as Ronnie D'Souza
- Bruna Abdullah as Anne Rosselline
- Sudesh Lehri as Pandit Kaushal Chand Sharma
- Santosh Shukla as Manik Singh
- Jeetu Verma as Subhash Prasad Agashe
- Vatsal Sheth as Harjeet
- Nauheed Cyrusi as Simran
- Vikas Bhalla as Rohan Sharma
- Raju Mavani as Rajkishan Gupta

=== Guest appearances ===
- Suniel Shetty as Captain Arjun Kaul
- Genelia D'Souza as Suman Sharma

== Production ==
=== Development ===
In late 2012, Sohail Khan announced he had planned to remake the Telugu film Stalin starring Chiranjeevi Konidela and Trisha Krishnan. Khan originally titled the film Mental, but by the time the it was released, it had been re-titled as Jai Ho.

=== Filming ===
Shooting for the film was set to begin 27 February 2013 but was postponed until late March. There were rumors that the film would be released in 3D, but Sohail Khan was cited stating, "First, let me complete my film in the normal format. Then I'll take a call".

== Marketing ==
Salman Khan unveiled the first look poster of Jai Ho on 6 December 2013. The poster consisted of images of thousands of fans digitally merged to create one portrait of Khan. Khan's fans designed this poster. The makers unveiled the film's official teaser on 13 December 2013. The official trailer of the film was released on 3 January 2014.

== Music ==
Jai Ho

Soundtrack album by Sajid–Wajid, Amaal Mallik and Devi Sri Prasad
- Released: 24 December 2013
- Genre: Feature film soundtrack
- Length: 35:45
- Label: T-Series
- Producer: Bhushan Kumar

Sajid–Wajid chronology
Bullett Raja (2013)	Jai Ho (2013)	Main Tera Hero (2014)

Devi Sri Prasad chronology
Veeram (2014)	Jai Ho (2014)	Bramman (2014)

Amaal Mallik chronology
Jai Ho (2014)	Khoobsurat (2014)

Sajid–Wajid, Amaal Mallik and Devi Sri Prasad composed the nine-song soundtrack album for Jai Ho, in which Malik had contributed three tracks and Prasad had contributed one track, while the former composed 5 tracks. Sajid, Irfan Kamal, Danish Sabri, Sameer Anjaan, Kausar Munir, Shabbir Ahmed, Armaan Malik, and Devi Sri Prasad wrote the lyrics for all the songs in the album. The full soundtrack album was released on 24 December 2013.

Jai Ho
No.	Title	Lyrics	Music	Singer(s)	Length
1.	"Baaki Sab First Class Hai"	Sajid, Irfan Kamal, Danish Sabri	Sajid–Wajid	Wajid	4:04
2.	"Tere Naina Maar Hi Daalenge"	Sameer Anjaan	Sajid–Wajid	Shreya Ghoshal, Shaan	5:00
3.	"Photocopy"	Kausar Munir	Sajid–Wajid	Himesh Reshammiya, Keerthi Sagathia, Palak Muchhal	4:36
4.	"Tumko To Aana Hi Tha"	Shabbir Ahmed	Amaal Mallik	Armaan Malik, Marianne D'Cruz, Altamash Faridi	4:13
5.	"Love You Till The End" (House Mix)	Armaan Malik	Amaal Mallik	Armaan Malik	3:56
6.	"Naacho Re"	Devi Sri Prasad	Devi Sri Prasad	Ujjayinee Roy	2:27
7.	"Jai Ho" (Title Track)	Shabbir Ahmed	Amaal Mallik	Wajid, Armaan Malik	3:20
8.	"Photocopy" (Remix)	Kausar Munir	Sajid–Wajid	Himesh Reshammiya, Keerthi Sagathia, Palak Muchhal	3:53
9.	"Baaki Sab First Class Hai" (Remix)	Sajid, Irfan Kamal, Danish Sabri	Sajid–Wajid	Wajid	2:47
Total length:					35:45

== Reception ==
=== Critical response ===
India Today gave Jai Ho a 3 out of 5 and commented that it was a rip off of Ek Tha Tiger with mindless action. Anupama Chopra gave the movie a 2.5 out of 5, stating, Jai Ho was more of a cartoon than a film.

Raja Sen of Rediff gave the film 2 out of 5 stars and said, Khan, Bollywood's real-life answer to Derek Zoolander, does his thing like only he can. And the crowd responds. Sitting in a single-screen theatre, the air was filled with shrill, thrilled whistles as soon as the censor certificate hit the screen. The first glimpse of Khan – via braceleted wrist – had the crowd in paroxysms." Rajeev Masand of CNN-IBN gave 2 stars out of 5, commenting "To be honest, very little stays with you when you leave the cinema, aside from the unpleasant aftertaste that comes from being shamelessly manipulated."

Taran Adarsh gave it 4.5 stars out of 5 and called it a "noble, well-intentioned message narrated in an entertaining format".

=== Box office ===
Jai Ho was released on around 3900 screens in India and 650 screens in overseas. The domestic and overseas theatrical rights were sold for ₹1.1 billion ($16 million). Jai Ho spent around ₹40 crore ($5.9 million) on the production of the film. The film cost around ₹650 million ($9.6 million) total with the cost of marketing and prints added, but this number still does not include Khan's remuneration. The satellite rights were sold for ₹50 crore ($7.4 million), and music rights were also sold for ₹12 crore ($1.8 million).

Jai Ho suffered losses from piracy. A Dubai-based user uploaded a pirated version of the film to YouTube on 28 January 2014. The video had 108,151 views by the time it was removed on 1 February 2014. Another version of the film was uploaded on 2 February 2014. DNA Films reported that Khan had requested that ticket prices be kept at the minimum so that people could afford to see the movie because of its message.

==== India ====
The website Boxofficeindia.com said that Jai Ho opened well at single screens like Jodhpur, Lucknow, Indore, Uttar Pradesh, Rajasthan and CI, with an occupancy of 80–100%, 25–30% better than Dhoom 3 and Chennai Express, and moderately well (50%) at multiplexes of Delhi, Punjab, Bangalore and Kolkata. It had an opening-day collection of around ₹188 million (US$2.0 million) nett. The second day collections were about ₹165 million (US$1.8 million), taking the total to ₹335 million (US$3.6 million). On Sunday, the film collected ₹263 million (US$2.8 million) to take its weekend total to ₹607 million (US$6.5 million). Jai Ho had a noticeable drop on Tuesday as it grossed around ₹7.75 crore nett taking the five-day total to a little over ₹74 crore nett. Jai Ho emerged as the fifth highest weekend of all time in terms of worldwide gross by managing to gross ₹200 crore worldwide in three days. Jai Ho dropped further on first Wednesday with collections around ₹5.25–5.50 crore nett to take 6-day total to ₹795 million (US$8.5 million). Jai Ho had the ninth highest first week of all time as it grossed ₹817 million (US$8.7 million) nett in its first week. The film nett. grossed ₹3 crore nett on its second Friday. The film has collected ₹90 crores nett in 9 days. Jai Ho collected ₹13.50 crore nett in its second weekend taking its domestic total ₹95 crore nett in 10 days. Jai Hai has been made tax-free in Gujarat and Uttar Pradesh. Jai Ho two-week business was around ₹101.50 crore nett as it crossed around ₹21.29 crore nett in its second week. Jai ho on its third Friday had collections set to be around ₹50 lakhs nett, with tax exemption in Gujarat also. Jai Ho grossed around ₹2.25–2.50 crore nett in its third weekend taking the business to ₹105.50 crore nett after seventeen days. The two-week distributor share of film is ₹56 crore. Jai Ho took its total to ₹107 crore nett in after three weeks as it added around ₹4 crore nett in third week. Bollywoodhungama declared the total net gross of Jai Ho ₹116 crore, and ranked it the seventh highest-grossing movie of 2014 and Salman Khan's seventh 100 crore movie in a row, an all-time record in the history of Indian cinema.

==== Overseas ====
The website, Bollywoodhungama.com estimated Jai Ho grossed $3.55 million overseas in its first weekend. Box Office India estimated it grossed slightly less at $3.45 million and called it "decent business". The final overseas gross for Jai Ho was $6 million making it one of the highest overseas grossing Bollywood films of 2014.

== See also ==
- Bollywood films of 2014
