= Bodyguard (2011 Kannada film) =

2011 Kannada romantic comedy film directed by Isaiah Gama

- Poster
- Directed by: Isaiah Gama
- Written by: Siddique
- Based on: Body Guard by Siddique
- Produced by: Parimala Jaggesh; Jaggesh
- Starring: Jaggesh; Daisy Shah; Spoorthi Suresh; Gurudutt
- Cinematography: Ashok V Raman
- Edited by: Enzo Filangeri
- Music by: Vinayachandra
- Release date: 4 November 2011
- Country: India
- Language: Kannada
- Budget: ₹3 million

Bodyguard is a 2011 Indian Kannada-language romance comedy action film starring Jaggesh and Daisy Shah. The film is directed by Isaiah. Parimala Jaggesh, wife of Jaggesh is producing this film with him under Gururaja films banner. Vinayachandra has composed the music and Ashok V. Raman has handled the camera work. Also, edited by Enzo, Fill, and Jerry. The film is a remake of the 2010 Malayalam film of the same name.

The film was released on 4 November 2011 and received generally negative reviews.

== Cast ==
- Jaggesh as Jayakrishna
- Daisy Shah as Ammu
- Spoorthi Suresh as Poorna
- Gurudutt as Ashok
- Sadhu Kokila as Neelambara
- Bank Janardhan
- Jeevan

== Soundtrack ==
The music was composed by Vinay Chandra and released by Akshaya Audio.

Bodyguard

Soundtrack album by Vinay Chandra
- Released: Jan 1, 2011
- Recorded: 2011
- Genre: Soundtrack
- Length: 19:18
- Label: Akshaya Audio
- Producer: Vinay Chandra

Track list
| No. | Title | Lyrics | Singer(s) | Length |
|---|---|---|---|---|
| 1. | "Kempayithu Neeli Akasha" | Kaviraj | Karthik, Anuradha Bhat | 5:01 |
| 2. | "Julu Julu" | Kaviraj | Karthik | 3:15 |
| 3. | "Padma Yaakinge Neenu" | Ram Narayan | Kailash Kher | 3:24 |
| 4. | "Nambidora Maneya" | V. Manohar | Jaggesh | 4:07 |
| 5. | "Yaake Guru College Ninge" | Ram Narayan | Tippu | 3:31 |
| Total length: | | | | 19:18 |

== Reception ==
=== Critical response ===
B S Srivani from Deccan Herald wrote that "There is hardly any depth in other roles as the film itself was meant to be a walk in the park. As such, this Bodyguard has little cinema muscle to show except the last 20 minutes of the film. The film perks up interest then and makes up for the rest". A critic from IANS wrote that "Ashok's camera work and Vinaya Chandra's music are much better when compared to other technical work in the film. 'Body Guard' is just an average flick which can be enjoyed only by ardent Jaggesh fans". A critic from The Times of India wrote that "For a change, Jaggesh is in a different role. It's a serious story with good narration that can be watched with family and friends. It's Jaggesh's show from the beginning to end".

== Home media ==
The film was telecast on Star Suvarna.
