= M.S. Dhoni: The Untold Story =

2016 Indian film by Neeraj Pandey

- Theatrical release poster
- Directed by: Neeraj Pandey
- Written by: Neeraj Pandey; Dilip Jha
- Produced by: Arun Pandey; Fox Star Studios
- Starring: Sushant Singh Rajput; Disha Patani; Kiara Advani; Anupam Kher; Bhumika Chawla; Kranti Prakash Jha; Alok Pandey
- Cinematography: Sudheer Palsane
- Edited by: Shree Narayan Singh
- Music by: Score: Sanjoy Chowdhury; Songs: Amaal Mallik
- Production companies: Fox Star Studios; Inspired Entertainment; Friday FilmWorks
- Distributed by: Fox Star Studios
- Release date: 30 September 2016
- Running time: 190 minutes
- Country: India
- Language: Hindi
- Budget: ₹104 crore (US$12 million)
- Box office: est. ₹216 crore (US$22 million)

M.S. Dhoni: The Untold Story is a 2016 Indian Hindi-language biographical sports drama film directed and co-written by Neeraj Pandey. It is based on the life of former Test, ODI and T20I captain of the Indian national cricket team, Mahendra Singh Dhoni, who is played by Sushant Singh Rajput. The film ensemble cast includes Disha Patani, Kiara Advani, and Anupam Kher. The film chronicles the life of Dhoni from a young age through a series of life events.

The idea of the biopic was put forward by Dhoni's manager, Arun Pandey, after encountering an incident at an airport after the 2011 Cricket World Cup Final. Development began two years later, with the consent of Dhoni. Neeraj Pandey was later approached to helm the film while he was working on Baby. Pandey recruited a number of people for researching into Dhoni's background and his life events. Dhoni eventually became a consultant on the film.

The film was released on 30 September 2016 by Fox Star Studios and received the widest release ever for a Bollywood film across 61 countries. In addition to being released in Hindi language, it was also dubbed in Tamil, Telugu, and Marathi languages, although the Marathi release was later cancelled due to opposition. Upon release, the film became a critical and commercial success. It is the fifth highest-grossing Bollywood film of 2016 and sixth highest grossing Indian film of 2016 worldwide ₹215.48 crore (US$22 million).

== Plot ==
Mahendra "Mahi" Singh Dhoni is born in Ranchi to Paan Singh, a modest water pump operator. At age fourteen, Mahi is a talented football goalkeeper until his school's cricket coach, Keshav Banerjee, notices his exceptional reflexes and invites him to try out as a wicket-keeper. Mahi rapidly excels at the sport, sharpening his unorthodox batting style to become a dependable cornerstone of the school team.

Years later, Mahi's consistent performances earn him a selection for the regional Ranji Trophy match in Kolkata. However, due to a delayed official notification, he misses his transit window and fails to report to the venue on time despite his friends' frantic efforts to drive him across state borders. To appease his anxious father, who desires financial stability for his son, Mahi accepts a job as a Ticket Collector at the Kharagpur Railway Station. He balances grueling day shifts with late-night practice sessions, eventually securing a spot on the Railways cricket team. During an Under-19 selection tournament, Mahi faces a formidable Punjab team led by Yuvraj Singh, whose monumental 301-run innings overshadows Mahi's squad, though Mahi's raw talent earns him a selection for the Duleep Trophy.

Feeling stifled and deeply depressed by his bureaucratic railway job, Mahi abruptly resigns, declaring to his father that he will dedicate his life entirely to cricket. His risk pays off when his explosive domestic performance catches national attention, leading to his debut for the India national cricket team. During a flight, he meets Priyanka Jha, an office consultant, and the two strike up a deep friendship. Inspired by her encouragement, Mahi scores a breakout international century against Pakistan, and they soon fall in love. On Valentine's Day, while returning home after purchasing a gift for Mahi, Priyanka is killed in a car accident. Devastated by the sudden loss, a grieving Mahi suffers a severe drop in form during India’s disastrous campaign at the 2007 Cricket World Cup.

Mahi gradually channels his grief into his sport and is appointed the captain of the national team. Under his leadership, a young squad triumphs at the inaugural 2007 ICC World Twenty20, followed by an unprecedented run that secures India the top spot in the ICC Test Rankings.

In 2010, while staying at a luxury hotel, Mahi meets Sakshi Singh Rawat, a hotel management intern who fails to recognize him due to his casual attire. Intrigued by her grounding nature, Mahi pursues her, and they begin dating. When Mahi eventually proposes marriage, he gently restrains her from buying him a Valentine's Day gift, protecting himself from the painful association of his past tragedy. Following their wedding, Mahi shifts his focus toward preparing the team for the 2011 Cricket World Cup on home soil.

At the tournament's final match against Sri Lanka in Mumbai, India faces a daunting run chase. Following the early dismissal of Virat Kohli, Captain Dhoni makes the tactical decision to promote himself up the batting order. He plays a resilient, high-pressure innings to steady the run chase. With only four runs remaining, Dhoni hits a historic, match-winning six, sending his family, childhood friends, and the entire nation into celebration. The film concludes with archival footage of the real-life MS Dhoni walking the boundary lines following the historic 2011 victory.

== Cast ==
- Sushant Singh Rajput as Mahendra 'Mahi' Singh Dhoni aka MS Dhoni
  - Zeeshan Nadaf as young Mahi
- Kiara Advani as Sakshi Singh Dhoni (née Rawat), Mahi's wife
- Disha Patani as Priyanka Jha, Mahi's former girlfriend
- Anupam Kher as Paan Singh Dhoni, Mahi's father
- Neeta Mohindra as Devaki Devi, Mahi's mother
- Bhumika Chawla as Jayanti Gupta, Mahi's sister
  - Swini Khara as young Jayanti
- Rajesh Sharma as Keshav Banerjee, Mahi's coach
- Shantilal Mukherjee as Kharagpur Station Master Shishir Sarkar
- Mithu Chakrabarty as Mrs. Banerjee
- Kumud Mishra as Deval Sahay
- Kali Prasad Mukherjee as Animesh Kumar "A. K." Ganguly
- Kranti Prakash Jha as Santosh Lal
- Deepak Dutta as Dilip Vengsarkar
- Ravindra Mankani as Jagmohan Dalmiya
- Herry Tangri as Yuvraj Singh (during 1999/00 Cooch Behar Trophy final)
- Rajendra Chawla as Mahi's first sponsor
- Monica Mundu as Mrs. Shukla
- Sarvadaman D. Banerjee as Chanchal
- Rhea Sharma as Ritu, Sakshi's college friend
- Alok Pandey as Chittu Pal, Mahi's best friend
- Sanjay Dadhich as Satya Prakash, Mahi's friend at railways
- Sandeep Nahar as Param 'Chhotu' Bhaiya, Mahi's Sikh friend
- Kiran More as himself (Chief National Selector)
- Aamir Khan via archival footage
- Raman Gupta
- Various other cricketers including Sachin Tendulkar, Virat Kohli, Virender Sehwag, Yuvraj Singh, Gautam Gambhir, Harbhajan Singh, Kumar Sangakkara, Muttiah Muralitharan, Lasith Malinga, make appearances in the film via archival footage.

== Production ==
=== Development ===
Since 2003, Dhoni's life has been chronicled in the media. Nobody knows what happened to him before that; before he made it to the Indian cricket team. So, it was relatively easy to revisit that life. That's where the story for the film came from.

— Director Neeraj Pandey

Development of a Dhoni biopic began after the 2011 Cricket World Cup Final and the discussion about the idea went on over the following years but remained dormant. Then, after a few years, Dhoni was at an airport when a child approached him and asked him a question on motivation. Dhoni sat down with the young boy and spent 5 minutes answering the question. His manager, Arun Pandey, asked why he spent that much time and Dhoni replied how his answer was pivotal in benefiting and motivating the boy. This incident then prompted Pandey to make a film about him saying [to Dhoni] that his story has the power to motivate millions of children like him. After the idea coalesced, Pandey began to convince Dhoni himself in order to adapt his life into a full-length feature film. When he was first approached on the idea of the adaptation, he became a little worried and questioned the need for it. But after being convinced by his peers, all he said was, "Don't misrepresent me. Show me as I am." It took Dhoni two years to finally agree. According to the International Business Times, the film carried a production budget of around ₹104 crore (US$11 million).

=== Writing ===
Pandey was attracted to Dhoni's story not because of his successful cricket career, saying that "it's foolish to chase MS Dhoni's life story only because it's about cricket," but rather to instances and factors that made him the person he is today. Dhoni wasn't involved in writing the script. Pandey recruited a team of researchers who collated data and background information while the director was busy directing Baby (2015). The filmmakers decided that they would only green-light the film once they had a convincing story to tell after the research. Pandey met with Dhoni numerous times over a span of eight months and by the eighth month of their meetings, in 2014, the main arc of the story began to form. Their first meeting took place in Delhi during a cricket match. During their sporadic meetings, Pandey chose not to record and tape their conversations which prompted Dhoni to open up more.

Arun Pandey says 98% of the content in the film is reality. The team undertook two years of research on the various incidents and how they took place. Pandey says "such authenticity would be hard to find even in Hollywood." Pandey revealed several prominent aspects of Dhoni's life that were hidden before including the fact that Dhoni initially disdained cricket and had a predilection for football instead, his signature "helicopter shot" was taught to him by his friend Santosh Lal, he likes women who don't recognise him, he and Yuvraj Singh had close ties even before their respective stardom and it was Dhoni who ousted Sourav Ganguly and Rahul Dravid from the team since he wanted to build a young team for the 2011 World Cup with better fielders and he wasn't too happy with the 'fitness' levels of the aforementioned cricketers.

Pandey decided to end the film with the 2011 Cricket World Cup Final since he felt "the arc of the story had a natural high at the 2011 World Cup win." He knew that they were chronicling almost 30 years of a sportsman's life "in a highly compressed manner" and said that had he extended the script to his sudden retirement during an ongoing series, the run time of the film would shoot up to six hours.

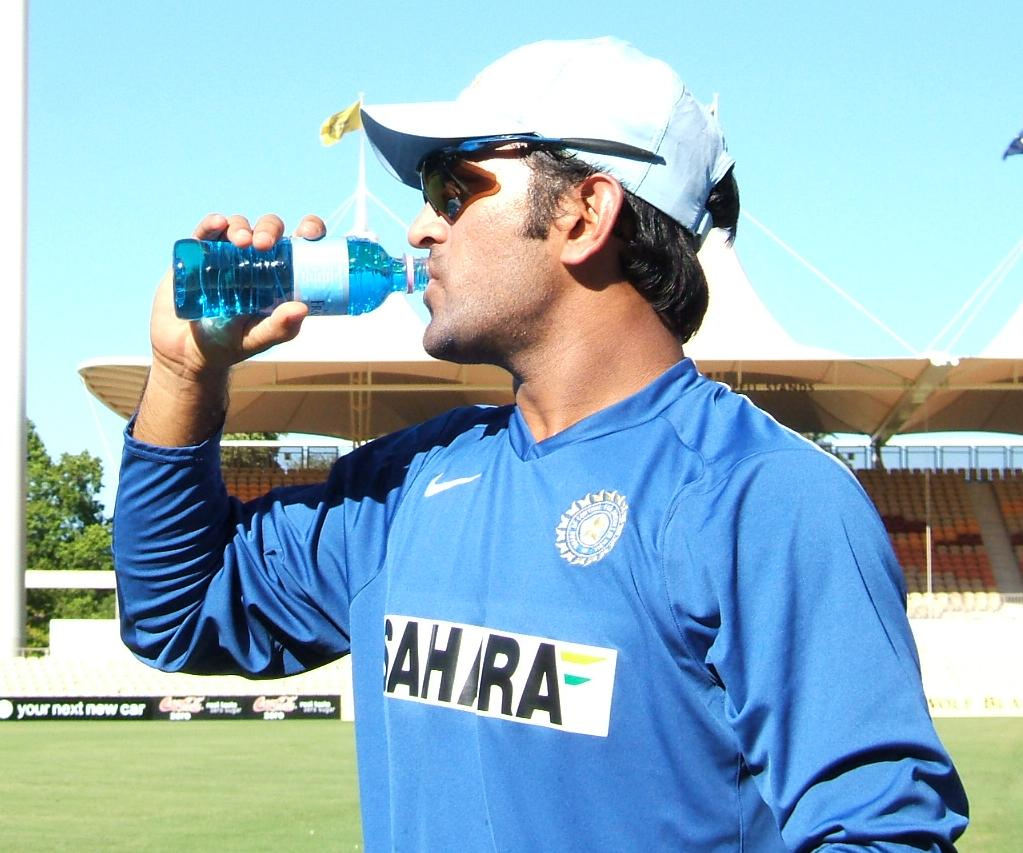
The film is based on the real life struggles of Indian cricketer MS Dhoni.

=== Pre-production ===
Neeraj Pandey was in the midst of shooting Baby (2015) when Arun Pandey, the manager of Dhoni, offered him an opportunity of making a biopic based on MS Dhoni. However, Pandey was sceptical and didn't wish to tackle such a subject until he met Dhoni himself. It was only after meeting Dhoni personally – during the second schedule of Baby – that he was convinced to helm the film. Although, to him, he treated the project not as a biopic, but more as an inspiring story. Pandey admits that he is not a fan of Dhoni and doesn't feel guilty about it. But he does have a predilection for cricket and other renowned cricketers like AB de Villiers and Sachin Tendulkar. He explained how not being a fan helped him direct the movie impartially, "I think if you are fan, as a director it would be difficult to be objective and impartial. A fan would only see positives. Even negatives will look like positives for him. So not being a fan helped me direct the movie impartially." It is the director's first biopic film.

Every question that came from the director or any member of the team working on the script was directly answered by Dhoni. He would clear any doubts of the director and Rajput. However, he did not want the film to serve as a whitewash of his life, "One thing I told (Neeraj) Pandey is that this movie should not be to glorify me. It's about the journey of a professional sportsperson and that's what it should depict."

=== Casting ===
Director Pandey, who had not seen any of Sushant Singh Rajput's films, followed his intuition when it came to casting him. Akshay Kumar wanted to play the lead role and wanted Rajput to play the younger MS Dhoni but Rajput was always the director's first choice given how both Dhoni and Rajput hail from the same part of India, which made it easy for him to get the dialect right and the fact he has a predilection for sports like Dhoni. When he met Rajput and chatted with him for 15 minutes, he knew that the accent, the setting and the milieu they needed to capture would not be a problem. Rajput admits that he is a fan of Dhoni, and describes himself as an "ardent" cricket fan. Rajput's sister is a professional cricketer who once made it to the women's national team, while he himself wasn't very good at the sport no matter how hard he tried, even failing to get selected for the school team.

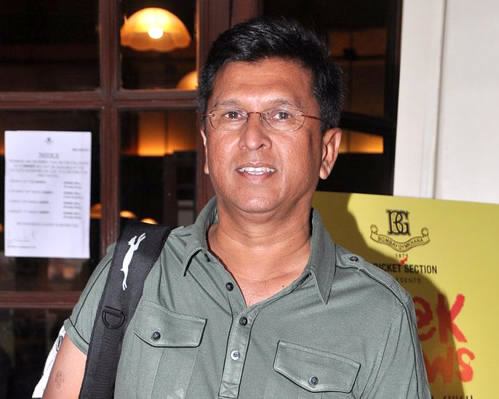
Kiran More (pictured) trained Rajput in cricket for four months.

He found it difficult to get Dhoni's mannerisms right. He said that he did not pretend to be Dhoni, but actually felt like the cricketer while essaying the title role. In order to prepare for his role, he had to go through an exhaustive prolonged training for a period of 18 months before shooting began and watched his videos for hours, to a point that he subconsciously started picking up some of his traits. For instance, in order to grasp Dhoni's trademark "Helicopter shot," the team would carefully analyse it and fix the bowling machine into one spot and then play the same shot at least 200 to 300 times a day for a week to a point that it came naturally to him. He also met Dhoni thrice before filming commenced. Former wicketkeeper Kiran More personally coached Rajput for four months, including wicket-keeping and batting before he started learning Dhoni's body language. He practiced for four hours, starting at 6:00 every morning. Rajput described More as a "tough taskmaster," who treated him like a professional cricketer rather than an actor. Dhoni's batting style was scientifically analysed, learnt and practised and an analyst was called on board for this. Training sessions were recorded and compared with the cricketer's real game. It took a further six months for Rajput to feel confident that he looked and played like Dhoni.

=== Principal photography ===
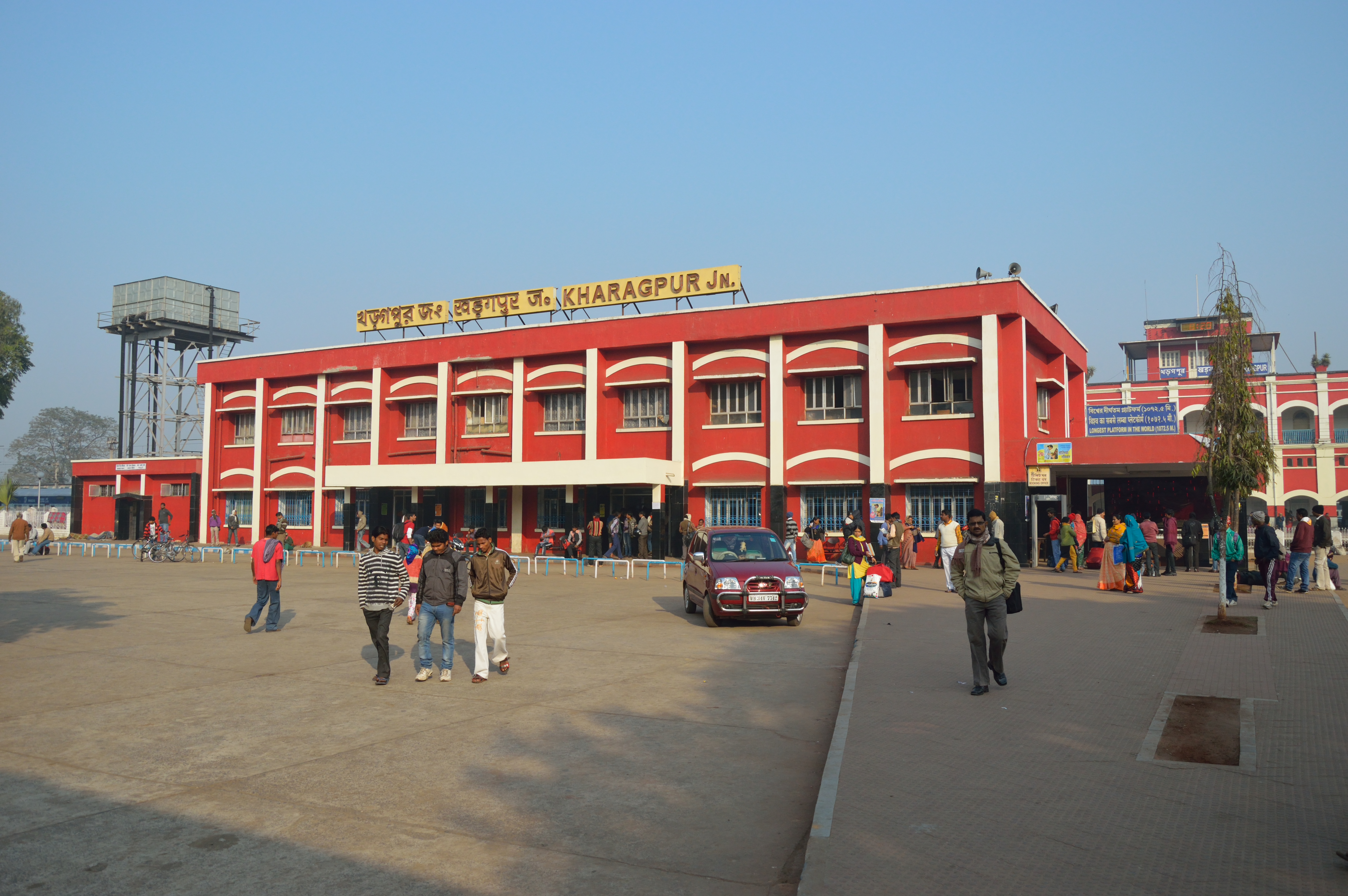
Kharagpur Junction railway station, one of the real-life locations used in the film where Dhoni worked as a former conductor.

The film was shot mainly in authentic and real-life locations where Dhoni spent much of his childhood and teenage years, with Pandey saying that 95% of the locations in the film were authentic. In an effort to stay true to the crux of the biopic, Neeraj also shot scenes from the film in Dhoni's real home in Ranchi, Jharkhand where his parents and brother Narendra currently live. Shooting also took place at Kharagpur railway station where Dhoni once worked as a Travelling Ticket Examiner (TTE), his old school, Jawahar Vidya Mandir and at the quarter number 142 of Mecon Limited he shared with his four roommates while studying engineering. The filmmakers were also shown his former social hangout as well as introduced to the food he liked eating whilst growing up. Dhoni's real school teacher was cast in the film.

Filming also took place in Jamshedpur with shots filmed at Keenan Stadium, and Aurangabad.

Rajput learned Dhoni's signature 'helicopter' shot by the end of the first day, but suffered a hairline fracture and had to leave for two weeks.

== Release ==
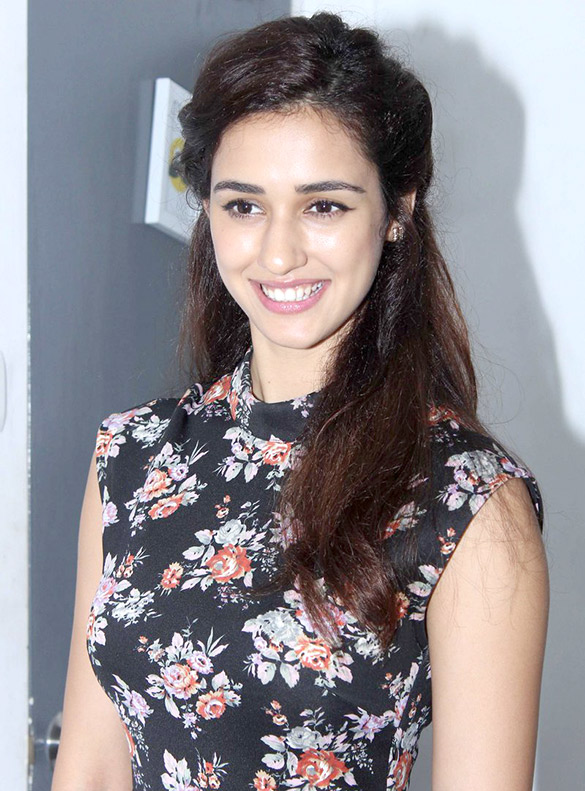
Disha Patani promoting the film at an event in September 2016.

M.S. Dhoni: The Untold Story received the widest release for a Bollywood film receiving a day-and-date release both in India and internationally in a total of 61 countries across approximately 4,500 screens worldwide on the week ending 2 October 2016.

However, the film was not released in Pakistan due to problems following the 2016 Uri attack. Sabina Islam, media and marketing manager of the distributor IMGC Global Entertainment in Pakistan told The Express Tribune, "We wouldn't want to release anything that can aggravate the current situation of the two countries. Dhoni is India's hero so it's risky." The film was also not released in Punjabi and Marathi languages. This was because Fox had wanted to release the film on the same day-and-date but a dubbed version in the two aforementioned languages could not be produced at that time.

Even though attempts were made later to dub and release the film in the Marathi language in the state of Maharashtra, this was however not possible. This was because Amey Khopkar, chief of Chitrapat Karmachari Sena, the film affairs wing of regional political party Maharashtra Navnirman Sena told the filmmakers that releasing the film in the language would cause unfair competition for regional movies by giving rise to a scenario where more filmmakers will release Hindi films dubbed in Marathi, prompting Pandey to scrap the plan.

The film was declared tax-free in Uttar Pradesh by Chief Minister Akhilesh Yadav a day after its release, and in Dhoni's home state, Jharkhand, a few days later. Maharashtra was also declared tax-free on 5 October by chief minister Devendra Fadnavis.

=== Marketing ===
The filmmakers organised large promotions, which later helped the movie register good advance booking. A teaser trailer was released on 15 March 2016, in conjunction with the commencement of the 2016 ICC World Twenty20. The first official poster was released on 7 July 2016, on Dhoni's 35th birthday. In late September 2016, the cast flew to Chennai to promote the film where Dhoni and Rajput met veteran actor Rajinikanth at his residence and discussed the film.

Maruti Suzuki released two MS Dhoni inspired special edition of Alto cars – the Alto 800 and Alto K10 – as part of the company's association with the film. The two cars were unveiled by Dhoni and R S Kalsi, Maruti Suzuki India Executive Director of Marketing and Sales in Hyderabad on 24 September. As a part of the association, Maruti Suzuki ran a series of customer engagement activities on social media.

The film recouped around ₹900 million (US$13.5 million) before its release via multiple platforms and ancillary; ₹550 million (US$8.2 million) from satellite rights; ₹200 million (US$3 million) from endorsement brands; ₹100 million (US$1.5 million) for overseas distribution rights; and ₹50 million (US$750,920) for music rights.

Internationally, the film was released in 60 countries across 1,000 screens in conjunction with its Indian premiere. According to Vijay Singh, that marks the biggest-ever release for a Hindi film in Tamil and Telugu and one of the widest for any Indian film internationally. It was released in key markets including the United States and Canada and the U.K. and in the other regular Bollywood diaspora markets in South East Asia, Africa and Europe. Through a chain of distributors the film also went out in non-regular Bollywood territories such as Japan, Spain, France, Hungary, Poland, the Philippines and the West Indies.

M.S. Dhoni: The Untold Story Game, a cricket sports mobile video game developed by Hungama Gameshastra Pvt. Ltd. (a joint venture of Hungama and Gameshastra) was also released a tie-in item to the film.

== Reception ==
=== Box office ===
==== India ====
The film was released on Friday, 30 September, across approximately 3,500 screens and delivered an opening of ₹213 million (US$2.2 million) on its first day, occupying 45–50% of the total marketplace which is the biggest opener of Sushant's career. Buoyed by positive reviews, the film earned a total of ₹660 million (US$6.9 million) net the second biggest opening for a Hindi release in 2016 behind Sultan. The Tamil version of the film collected ₹70 million (US$730,000) in its opening weekend in Tamil Nadu, which is the highest for a film dubbed from Hindi in the state.

Following its weekend debut, the film witnessed a sharp fall on Monday earning ₹85.1 million (US$880,000) and ₹₹75.2 million (US$780,000) on Tuesday. By 11 October, the film had grossed a total of ₹1.16 billion (US$12 million) in India and is currently the fifth highest-grossing Hindi film of 2016 in India.

==== International ====
Internationally, the film made an estimated ₹219 million (US$2.3 million) in its opening weekend from 60 countries. It had successful debuts in many markets, including $1.1 million in the U.S., $995,000 in the Middle East, $263,000 in the U.K. where it ranked at No. 9, and $194,000 in Australia for tenth spot. The film received a limited release in the U.S. and Canada across 256 theaters and earned $1,108,650 at an average of $4,331 per theater, debuting at number 14 at the box office, becoming the third Bollywood film of 2016 to debut above $1 million, following Sultan and Fan.

=== Critical response ===
The film received mainly positive reviews from critics.

The film was noted for omitting certain aspects of Dhoni's life and in the realm of cricket that were deemed noteworthy such as the 2009 ICC World Twenty20 press conference, where Dhoni brought the entire team and read out a statement of unity, the 2013 Indian Premier League spot-fixing and betting case and the alleged rift with Virender Sehwag and Gautam Gambhir. The film also does not include Dhoni's take on the two-year ban imposed on Chennai Super Kings from playing in the Twenty20 which he captained at that time, which ultimately led to the Supreme Court asking N. Srinivasan to step aside as BCCI President. The film also does not provide any explanation to Dhoni's purchase (and eventual sale) of the 15% stake in the player management firm Rhiti Sports, or why he was named the vice-president of India Cements. While the film featured his sister Jayanti, there was no mention about his real life elder brother, Narendra Singh Dhoni, who is a politician. Chanchal Bhattacharya, a specialised cricket coach who used to train young cricketers in Dhoni's school campus pinpointed at a pivotal incident during Dhoni's days which was absent in the movie: Dhoni once scored a century for East Zone in a Deodhar Trophy against Central Zone. Karsan Ghavri, who was the coach of East Zone at that time, praised Dhoni's century saying that "this lad will represent the country one day."

The Hindu said, "of course such sanitisation makes the film lose out on interesting layers and complexity, but, curiously, the focused, unwavering eulogising of Dhoni also helps it get an unmistakeable emotional acuity." In a more positive take, Andy Bull of The Guardian said that not every aspect of Dhoni's life could be included in the three-hour-and-10-minute-long biopic. He quoted John Briley's famous line from the script he wrote for Richard Attenborough's Gandhi: "No man's life can be encompassed in one telling. There is no way to give each year its allotted weight, to include each event, each person who helped to shape a lifetime."

Veteran actor Rishi Kapoor gave a positive review of the film, praising the performance of Rajput in particular. Several professional Indian sportsmen and sportswomen, such as cricketer Mohammad Kaif and badminton player Saina Nehwal, had high regards for the film.

Rachel Saltz of The New York Times gave a negative review of the film, saying that "you don't have to understand cricket to enjoy a good cricket movie", e.g. Lagaan (2001), but one does "have to be a cricket fan, and an indulgent one at that" for M.S. Dhoni: The Untold Story. She found the term "hagiographic" unfit for the film and labelled the film as "long and languid." She concluded by saying, "I learned more about Mr. Dhoni — his enigmatic character and what marked him as a great captain — by reading about him after watching this movie than I did during three long hours."

== Music ==
Amaal Mallik composed the soundtrack for M.S. Dhoni. Rochak Kohli composed one song as a guest composer. T-Series acquired the music rights for the film. The 10-song album features the voices of singers Armaan Malik, Arijit Singh, Siddharth Basrur, Rochak Kohli and Palak Muchhal; it was released in three different language versions: Tamil, Telugu and Marathi. Tamil lyrics were penned by P. Vijay, Telugu by Chaitanya Prasad and Marathi by Guru Thakur. The background music was composed by Sanjoy Chowdhury.

== Accolades ==
Award (Note: Awards, festivals and organizations are in alphabetical order.)	Date of ceremony (Note: Date is linked to the article about the awards held that year, wherever possible.)	Category	Recipient(s)	Result	Ref.
BIG ZEE Entertainment Awards	29 July 2017	Most Entertaining Drama Film	M.S. Dhoni: The Untold Story	Nominated	
BIG ZEE Entertainment Awards	29 July 2017	Most Entertaining Actor in a Drama Film – Male	Sushant Singh Rajput	Won	
BIG ZEE Entertainment Awards	29 July 2017	Most Entertaining Actor (Film) – Male	Sushant Singh Rajput	Nominated	
BIG ZEE Entertainment Awards	29 July 2017	Most Entertaining Actor in a Drama Film – Female	Disha Patani	Nominated	
BIG ZEE Entertainment Awards	29 July 2017	Most Entertaining Actor (Film) Debut – Female	Disha Patani	Won	
BIG ZEE Entertainment Awards	29 July 2017	Most Entertaining Singer (Female)	Palak Muchhal – (for "Kaun Tujhe")	Nominated	
Filmfare Awards	14 January 2017	Best Actor	Sushant Singh Rajput	Nominated	
Filmfare Awards	14 January 2017	Best Female Playback Singer	Palak Muchhal – (for "Kaun Tujhe")	Nominated	
Indian Film Festival of Melbourne	10–22 Aug 2017	Best Film	M.S. Dhoni: The Untold Story	Nominated	
Indian Film Festival of Melbourne	10–22 Aug 2017	Best Actor	Sushant Singh Rajput	Won	
International Indian Film Academy Awards	14–15 July 2017	Best Film	M.S. Dhoni: The Untold Story	Nominated	
International Indian Film Academy Awards	14–15 July 2017	Best Director	Neeraj Pandey	Nominated	
International Indian Film Academy Awards	14–15 July 2017	Best Actor	Sushant Singh Rajput	Nominated	
International Indian Film Academy Awards	14–15 July 2017	Best Supporting Actor	Anupam Kher	Won	
International Indian Film Academy Awards	14–15 July 2017	Best Supporting Actress	Disha Patani	Nominated	
International Indian Film Academy Awards	14–15 July 2017	Star Debut of the Year – Female	Disha Patani	Won	
International Indian Film Academy Awards	14–15 July 2017	Best Music Director	Amaal Mallik	Nominated	
International Indian Film Academy Awards	14–15 July 2017	Best Male Playback Singer	Armaan Malik – (for "Besabriyaan")	Nominated	
News18 Movie Awards	20 March 2017	Best Actor	Sushant Singh Rajput	Nominated	
News18 Movie Awards	20 March 2017	Best Debut (Female)	Disha Patani	Nominated	
News18 Movie Awards	20 March 2017	Best Playback Singer (Female)	Palak Muchhal – (for "Kaun Tujhe")	Won	
Screen Awards	4 December 2016	Best Actor (Critics)	Sushant Singh Rajput	Won	
Screen Awards	4 December 2016	Best Female Debut	Disha Patani	Won	
Screen Awards	4 December 2016	Best Female Playback Singer	Palak Muchhal – (for "Kaun Tujhe")	Won	
Stardust Awards	21 December 2016	Best Film of the Year	M.S. Dhoni: The Untold Story	Nominated	
Stardust Awards	21 December 2016	Best Director	Neeraj Pandey	Nominated	
Stardust Awards	21 December 2016	Best Actor	Sushant Singh Rajput	Nominated	
Stardust Awards	21 December 2016	Best Supporting Actor	Anupam Kher	Nominated	
Stardust Awards	21 December 2016	Best Debut Female	Disha Patani	Won	
Stardust Awards	21 December 2016	Best Music Director	Amaal Mallik	Nominated	
Stardust Awards	21 December 2016	Best Female Playback Singer	Palak Muchhal – (for "Kaun Tujhe")	Nominated	
Zee Cine Awards	11 March 2017	Best Film	M.S. Dhoni: The Untold Story	Nominated	
Zee Cine Awards	11 March 2017	Critics Award for Best Film	M.S. Dhoni: The Untold Story	Nominated	
Zee Cine Awards	11 March 2017	Best Director	Neeraj Pandey	Nominated	
Zee Cine Awards	11 March 2017	Best Actor – Male	Sushant Singh Rajput	Nominated	
Zee Cine Awards	11 March 2017	Critics Award for Best Actor – Male	Sushant Singh Rajput	Nominated	
Zee Cine Awards	11 March 2017	Best Actor in a Supporting Role – Male	Anupam Kher	Nominated	

== See also ==
- Cricket in film and television
