= Kaun Tujhe =

Song by Amaal Mallik feat. Palak Muchhal
- Language: Hindi
- Released: 28 August 2016
- Recorded: 2015
- Genre: Filmi, Romantic Ballad
- Label: T-Series
- Composer: Amaal Mallik
- Lyricist: Manoj Muntashir

"Kaun Tujhe" (transl. Who Would) is a Hindi song from the soundtrack of the 2016 Hindi Film, M.S. Dhoni: The Untold Story. The song was penned by Manoj Muntashir, composed by Amaal Mallik, sung by Palak Muchhal and arranged and produced by Meghdeep Bose. The song is featured in the film in a scene involving Sushant Singh Rajput and Disha Patani.

== Reception ==
Box Office Collection India described the song as "very beautiful" and singer Palak Muchchal as "melodious". It rated the song 4.3 out of 5 stars. In its review it rates the lyrics and singing as "Excellent" and the music as "Very Good".

India Today wrote: "Kaun Tujhe is the female version of the typical Armaan Malik romantic song - which are essentially paeans for the lover, who is exclusive, one in a million. Once again, the song is a winner because of the simplicity of its composition, singing, lyrics, and arrangement, which is not intrusive. Amaal Mallik lets his music breathe and take its time to come to its own in this film and that is a great quality."

Times of India wrote: "'Kaun Tujhe' tells the love story of MS Dhoni and his late girlfriend, Priyanka Jha. The song shows how the couple enjoyed simple joys of life such as a stroll in a market wherein Dhoni walked with a helmet on to avoid catching attention, highlighting the struggles of celebrities with the paparazzi. Dhoni's ladylove died in a tragic accident in 2002 when the successful innings of Indian skipper had just begun."

Daily News and Analysis wrote: "The song 'Kaun Tujhe' has been penned by Manoj Muntashir and composed by Amaal Mallik. Palak Muchhal has lent her soulful voice to make it even more melodious. The song has been picturised very beautifully, portraying Sushant and Disha's light hearted romantic moments while the lyrics aptly form the backdrop of their love story."

== Accolades ==
Award (Note: Awards, festivals and organizations are in alphabetical order.)	Date of ceremony (Note: Date is linked to the article about the awards held that year, wherever possible.)	Category	Recipient(s)	Result	Ref.
BIG ZEE Entertainment Awards	29 July 2017	Most Entertaining Singer (Female)	Palak Muchhal	Nominated	
Filmfare Awards	14 January 2017	Best Female Playback Singer	Palak Muchhal	Nominated	
News18 Movie Awards	20 March 2017	Best Playback Singer (Female)	Palak Muchhal	Won	
Screen Awards	4 December 2016	Best Female Playback Singer	Palak Muchhal	Won	
