= Khuda Kasam =

- Theatrical release poster
- Directed by: K. C. Bokadia
- Written by: K. C. Bokadia
- Produced by: Malook Nagar; Amit Bokadia
- Starring: Sunny Deol; Tabu; Mukesh Rishi; Govind Namdeo; Ashish Vidyarthi; Farida Jalal
- Cinematography: Peter Pereira
- Edited by: D. N. Malik
- Music by: Aadesh Shrivastava
- Production company: Sangeeta Pictures
- Distributed by: NH Studioz
- Release date: 26 November 2010
- Running time: 122 minutes
- Country: India
- Language: Hindi

Khuda Kasam (transl. By God) is a 2010 Indian Hindi-language action drama film directed by K C Bokadia and produced by Amit Kumar Bokadia. The films stars Sunny Deol, Tabu and Mukesh Rishi in pivotal roles. The film was filmed across 1997 and 2004. After multiple production delays and title changes, the film was finally released on 26 November 2010.

== Plot ==
The story begins by introducing Hussain as an upright Muslim truck driver working for the state's Home Minister Bhavani Prasad Lalla (BPL). When Hussain discovers that BPL is using his transport business for illegal weapons smuggling, he threatens to expose the politician to the police. In retaliation, BPL falsely implicates Hussain in a crime and has him thrown into jail. Meanwhile, Neetu Singh, a CBI officer, is assigned to investigate the murder of the state's Chief Minister. Her initial inquiry quickly leads her to BPL, and she gathers evidence of his culpability, bravely threatening to bring him to justice. BPL, however, uses his considerable influence to strike back at her. He successfully manipulates the legal system, using manipulated evidence and collusion with corrupt officials like ACP Waghmare and Jailer Lalkaar Singh, to have Neetu Singh framed for the CM's murder. She is sentenced to a five-year rigorous imprisonment term, where she faces severe torture orchestrated by BPL's men. Meanwhile, Hussain completes his sentence and is released, determined to seek revenge on BPL. However, his devout mother, Fatima, makes him take an oath to abstain from violence.

The paths of the two protagonists converge when Neetu, during an escape attempt from the hospital where she was being treated, is shot by Waghmare. She uses this opportunity to fake her death and disappear. She then reappears as "Miss Madonna", a glamorous, London-based pop singer. This new identity is a calculated ruse, allowing Neetu to get close to the obsessed and infatuated BPL to execute her revenge plan. She cleverly manipulates BPL into killing Waghmare and causes Jailer Lalkaar Singh to surrender to the police out of fear, effectively dismantling BPL's network of cronies.

Simultaneously, BPL, realizing that Hussain is weakened by his vow of non-violence, targets his family. BPL kidnaps Shanti Devi, Hussain's blind friend and the woman who once saved his life. Fatima releases Hussain from his oath, pleading with him to rescue Shanti. Now free to act, Hussain confronts BPL. In the climax, the two narrative threads fully intertwine: Hussain gets the better of BPL during the rescue, and Neetu Singh, having recovered the necessary evidence and completed her deception, finally takes her revenge by killing the Home Minister, thus clearing her name and ensuring justice for the Chief Minister's murder.

== Cast ==
- Sunny Deol as Hussain
- Tabu as CBI officer Neetu Singh
- Ashish Vidyarthi as Home Minister Bhawani Prasad Lala / BPL
- Mukesh Rishi Inspector Lalkaar Singh
- Govind Namdeo as SP Waghmare
- Farida Jalal as Fatima
- Raza Murad as CBI Chief Vikram Sawant
- Beena as Shanti
- Sadashiv Amrapurkar as Public Prosecutor Shyamu
- Dinesh Hingoo as Sitaram Gidwani
- Rammohan Sharma as Chief Minister Satyaprakash
- Hemanth Ravan as Tatya
- Vikas Anand as Defence lawyer Mohan Prasad
- Jack Gaud as Goon who abducts Hussain's sister
- Daisy Shah as a dancer in an item number
- Guddi Maruti as Julie

== Music and Soundtrack ==
The film’s music was composed by Aadesh Shrivastava and the lyrics of the songs were penned by Dev Kohli.
