= The Diary of West Bengal =

Upcoming Indian film by Sanoj Mishra

- Directed by: Sanoj Mishra
- Written by: Sanoj Mishra
- Produced by: Jitendra Narayan; Singh Tyagi (Waseem Rizvi)
- Starring: Yajur Marwah: Dev Fauzdar; Deepak Kamboj; Ramendra Chakarwarti; Ashish Kumar; Reena Bhattacharya; Neet Mahal; Gauri Shankar; Avadh Ashwini; Ronav Verma
- Cinematography: Satyapal Singh
- Edited by: Ranjeet Prasad
- Music by: A. R. Datta
- Production company: Waseem Rizvi Films
- Release date: 30 August 2024
- Running time: 135 minutes
- Country: India
- Language: Hindi

The Diary of West Bengal is a 2024 Indian Hindi-language political drama film directed by Sanoj Mishra and produced by Jitendra Narayan Singh Tyagi. The film is presented by Waseem Rizvi Films and features an ensemble cast including Yajur Marwah, Arshin Mehta, Dev Fauzdar, Ramendra Chakarwarti, Gauri Shankar, Deepak Kamboj, Neet Mahal, Avadh Ashwini, Ronav Verma, and Ashish Kumar. Its music is composed by A. R. Datta, with lyrics written by Kundan Vidyarthi and Sameer Shashtri. The film was released worldwide on 30 August 2024.

== Plot ==
Set against the backdrop of the 1971 Bangladesh genocide, The Diary of West Bengal follows the journey of Suhasini, a Hindu widow. With her husband killed in the genocide, Suhasini joins a group of widowed and destitute women for safety. Their journey was from Bangladesh to West Bengal; many of Suhasini's companions died along the way.

Suhasini survives and reaches Kolkata, West Bengal. There, Suhasini falls prey to "love jihad" and encounters severe religious discrimination. The film depicts her witnessing the exploitation of foreign nationals as votebanks from the Government of West Bengal. Determined to expose the political machinations, Suhasini embarks to compel the Indian government and human rights organizations to take action.

== Cast ==
- Yajur Marwah as Prateek
- Arshin Mehta as Suhasini Bhatacharya
- Gauri Shankar as Ghazi Khan
- Dev Fauzdar as Vishal
- Ramendra Chakarwarti as Commander in Chief
- Avadh Ashwini as Ahmed
- Ronav Verma as Abul Khair
- Ashish Kumar as Ashish Rajput
- Naresh Sharma as Jamal
- Anil Anjunil
- Reena Bhattacharya
- Anuj Dixit
- Deepak Kamboj
- Garima Kapoor
- Neet Mahal
- Abhishek Mishra
- Alfiya Shaikh
- Preeti Shukla

== Controversy ==
The film has generated significant controversy due to its sensitive subject matter. The film's critics argue that it defames Bengal, resulting in several fatwas being issued against it. Additionally, director Sanoj Mishra has expressed fears for his safety after being summoned by the Kolkata Police, stating concerns that he might be killed. The film's trailer further sparked controversy. Following these allegations, the West Bengal Police issued a legal notice to director Sanoj Mishra. In August 2024, after he had not been seen for eight days, it was reported that Mishra had relocated to Varanasi, Uttar Pradesh for fear of "police action" related to the film.

Shaikh Maulana Rajani Hasan Ali, the vice-president of Shia Ulema-e-Hind Lucknow, a board of Shia Ulamas, said that the production aims to tarnish the image of Islam and of Mohammad.

== Release ==
The trailer was released by Rambhadracharya on 12 August 2024.

The Calcutta High Court rejected a petition to block the release of the film in West Bengal, but as of mid-August 2024, no cinemas in the state had plans to screen it.

== Music ==
The Diary of West Bengal (original Motion Picture soundtrack)
No.	Title	Lyrics	Music	Singer	Length
1.	"Suna Ghar Suna Aangan"	Kundan and Manish Shashtree	A R Datta	Manish S Sharma	3:09
2.	"Sun Le Dua"	Deepak Noor	Afsar Nadeem	Tushar Verma	3:45
3.	"Fagun Laga"	Sanoj Mishra	A . R. Datta	Soumya	3:38
