= Rishi Bhutani =

Indian actor

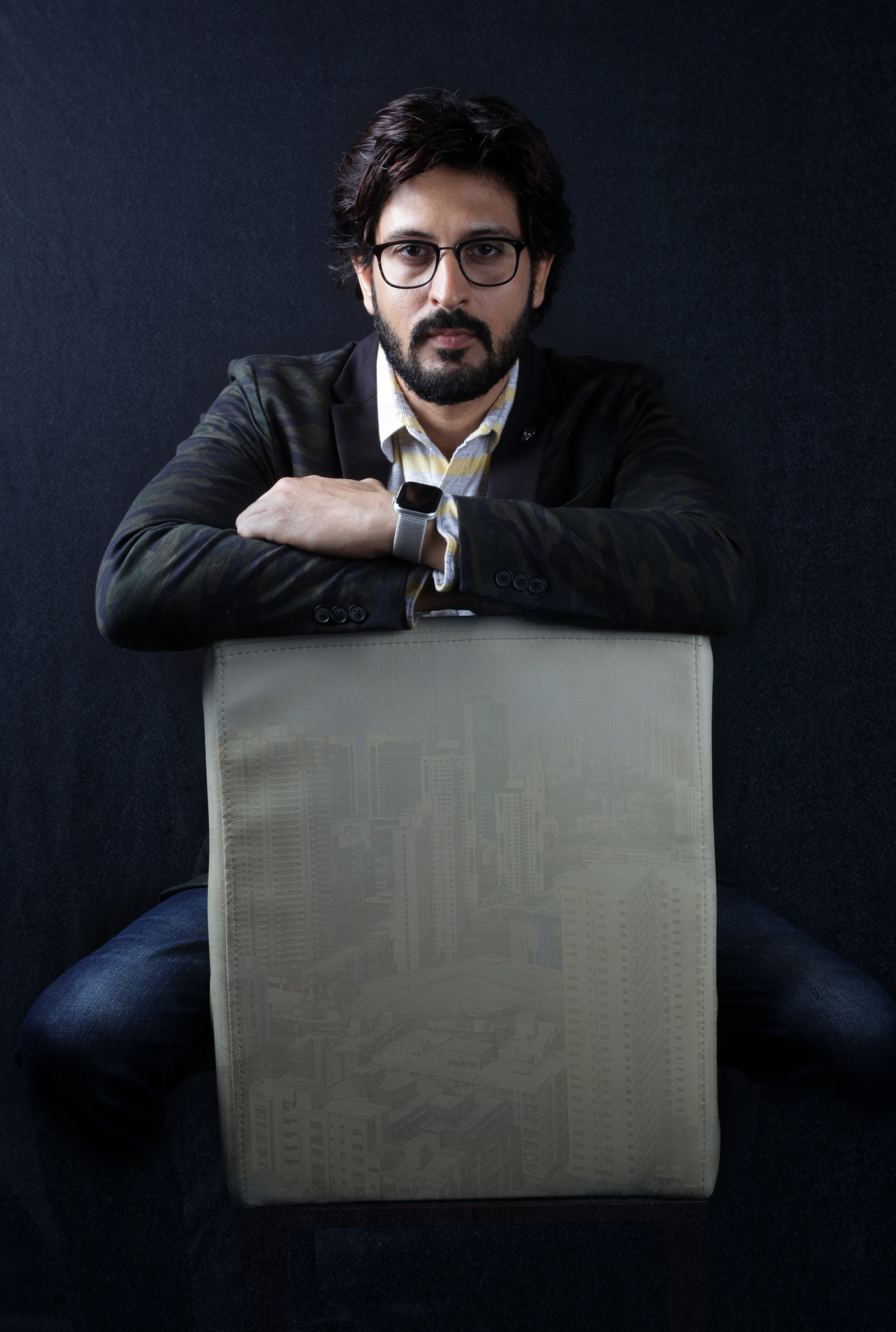
- Rishi Bhutani's look for the film "Lines"
- Occupation: Actor
- Years active: 2009–present

Rishi Bhutani is an Indian actor, who appears in Bollywood films. Bhutani first gained recognition as an obsessive son in the thriller movie Bolo Raam (2009), in which he gave a critically acclaimed performance and earned a nomination for Best Actor category at the Lions Gold Awards. He next appeared in the biopic Jai Jawaan Jai Kisaan (2015), portraying the freedom fighter Jawaharlal Nehru. Other notable projects include Ram Ratan, Ashley and CuteGirl_87, Vodka Diaries (2017) is with Raima Sen, K.K Menon and Mandira Bedi. He did notable films with National Award Winner Om Puri - Gandhigiri, Bolo Raam and Jai Jawan Jai Kisan. His last film, Lines, is critically acclaimed now available on Voot online platform. His upcoming movies are French movie - Highland, Zindagi Jhingalala Re and Bed No.17.

== Career ==
Bhutani made his film debut with the 2009 psychological thriller Bolo Raam, where he played the titular character who gets framed for murdering his mother. Film critic Taran Adarsh praised Bhutani's work, stating it as "a commendable job". Further, he added that he "oozes confidence, despite sharing the same frame with accomplished actors." He was also nominated for his performance at Lions Gold Awards in 2009. In 2012, Bhutani acted in a short film LOC... A Playground, where he played a role of an Indian army soldier. The film won awards including Critics Award for Sport Promotion and Best Film on National Integration at the Imphal International Short Film Festival 2012. In 2015, Bhutani played the role of Jawaharlal Nehru in the biopic drama Jai Jawaan Jai Kisaan.

== Accolades ==
Bhutani was nominated as a Top 100 Forbes India Celebrity in 2015. In addition, he also won an award at France Vittel International Film Festival (VIFF) in 2012 for LOC... A Playground. (Note: Bhutani stated in an interview with Daily News and Analysis that he won a Best Actor award for "LOC...", though according to The Navhind Times report, he won a producer's award for the film.)

== Filmography ==
- Bed No.17 (Upcoming 2020)
- Ramratan (2017)
- Vodka Diaries (2017)
- Highland (French) (upcoming)
- Gandhigiri (2016) as Yuvraaj
- Jai Jawaan Jai Kisaan (2014) as Jawaharlal Nehru
- Bolo Raam (2009) as Raam
