= Bolo Raam =

- Directed by: Rakesh Chaturvedi
- Written by: Ameer Sultan
- Produced by: Goldy Bhutani
- Starring: Rishi Bhutani; Disha Pandey; Padmini Kolhapure; Om Puri
- Cinematography: April A. Xavier
- Edited by: Aseem Sinha
- Music by: Songs: Sachin Gupta; Background Score: Sanjoy Chowdhury
- Production company: Shree Keshav Films
- Distributed by: Shree Keshav Films
- Release date: 31 December 2009
- Running time: 107 minutes
- Country: India
- Language: Hindi

Bolo Raam is a 2009 Indian Hindi-language thriller film directed by Rakesh Chaturvedi, released on 31 December 2009. This film is a remake of the Tamil film Raam, released in 2005.

== Plot ==
Bolo Raam follows the story of Raam, an angry young man obsessed with his mother. Raam is accused of her murder, leading to an investigation during which Raam chooses to remain silent.

During this whole time the investigation continues and Inspector Indrajeet Singh learns that Raam had the tendency to right wrongs and is serious about this. His mother was influenced by others to send him to a hostel but at the last minute she changed her decision seeing that her son could hurt someone there. During this time it is also revealed that his mother had run away from her house and married Raam's father, who left her before his birth. Juhi, daughter of sub-inspector Sajid Khan, falls in love with Raam and one night when she sneaks into his house, she finds him asleep. She gives him a kiss and is about to leave immediately when her father finds her and beats her. Raam's mother tries to stop him but Khan accuses her of being characterless. He then tries to arrest Raam under a false charge but Juhi promises that she will never meet Raam again. It is found that Raam's mother was a woman of character and Raam was only aggressive sometimes not unstable. This time a psychiatrist, Dr. Negi finds that Raam is unstable as he can not believe his mother is dead. In between this scenario Raam also tries to run away from jail once and is found near his mother's body claiming that his mother is asleep.

The day when Raam is about to be taken to court, Inspector Khan's son, Sameer, comes to Raam and tells him to accept his crime, during his visit Raam gets hold of his sleeve button. Raam finally realizes that his mother is dead and that Sameer is the killer. He runs away from prison to avenge his mother. He reaches Khan's house and starts beating Sameer but Khan and Singh also arrive and discover the truth. Sameer was under the influence of a Maulana who ran a terrorist group. He gave Sameer a book about terrorism, asking him to be careful. Raam's mother sees this and threatens to tell his father, so he kills her. Sameer then grasps the Inspector's pistol and shoots him along with his father. Raam beats him and kills him in the end.

== Cast ==
- Rishi Bhutani as Ram
- Disha Pandey as Juhi
- Padmini Kolhapure as Raam's mother
- Om Puri as Indrajeet Singh
- Naseeruddin Shah as Dr. Negi
- Govind Namdev as Sajid Khan
- Rajpal Yadav as Ram's friend

== Reception ==
Taran Adarsh called it a "compelling flick" but complained the final mystery's resolution was sloppy and didn't follow its lead-up. Sonia Chopra gave it half a star out of five.

== Soundtrack ==
No.	Title	Singer(s)	Length
1.	"Do Dil Hai Janwa"	Monali Thakur, Soham Chakraborty
2.	"Tere Ishq Mein Kya" (Remix)	Sunidhi Chauhan
3.	"Maa Tere Jaisa Koi" (Remix)	Sukhwinder Singh
4.	"Tere Ishq Mein Kya"	Sunidhi Chauhan
5.	"Maa Tere Jaisa Koi"	Sukhwinder Singh
