= Surya – The Super Cop =

- Country of origin: India
- Original language: Hindi
- No. of seasons: 1
- No. of episodes: 32

Production
- Producer: B. P. Singh
- Running time: 50 minutes

Original release
- Network: Sony Entertainment Television
- Release: 4 April – 26 May 2011

Surya: The Super Cop is an Indian drama television series. It features three separate investigative units working on different crimes with each crime to be aired as a start-to-finish story episode. The binding link between the three Crime Branch Units and the independent stories is Surya (Harsh Chhaya), a middle-aged blind man, who is their friend, philosopher and guide. A genius with vast experience in investigating crimes, Surya is a former senior police officer, currently under suspension pending the report of a Departmental Enquiry probing a tragic incident where his passion to nab the culprits led to him being blinded and a few of his colleagues losing their lives.

== Plot ==
The story of Surya:The Super Cop is based on the binding link between the three Crime Branch Units. There is an independent story also of a middle-aged blind man, Surya. He is their friend, philosopher and guide.

Surya is genius with an IQ of 200 and a vast experience in investigating crimes. He was a senior police officer who is currently under suspension pending the report of a Departmental Enquiry. Surya is restricted to his home space due to his condition.

The CB units go to him for advice on cases during the course of investigation when they feel they have reached a dead-end in this series. Surya has a sharp mind to picture the crime scene with just information from the team and give them brilliant insights.

Surya helps out the teams unofficially and the teams do not really report to him but hold him as their idol and guiding light.

== Cast ==
- Harsh Chhaya - Surya Pratap

Surya is about 40 or 45 years of age, with mature good looks and a brilliant intellect, and it is not easy to make out that he is blind and can hardly see anything. The ease and confidence with which he carries himself around the house is that of a normal man, almost the same way he did before he lost his eyesight a few months back and camouflages any pain that he would be feeling about his life having turned upside down since then. Just till a few months back he was the Chief Investigating Officer of the Crime Branch, with all the units reporting to him. He had a remarkable professional track record and was respected by his superiors, admired by his colleagues and a role model for his juniors, who had blind faith in his intellect and integrity and took pride in reporting to him. But one Surya lives with his elder brother, bhabhi and their two kids, one a 15-year-old son and another a 12-year-old daughter. Surya was married but has separated from his wife who has started visiting him after the tragic incident. There still is a bond between them.

- Priyanka Bassi - Kaya

A 26-year-old stunning woman with an electrifying personality. The moment she is introduced to Rajhans, they freeze and go back in time to when they studied in the same college. They have a bitter history where a starry-eyed, colourful and immature Kaya had lost her heart to a suave, idealistic, intellectually appealing good-looking college President Rajhans who rejected her and went on to mock her. Seven years later, a lot has changed. Kaya is a mature, sassy, sophisticated, no-nonsense, skilled homicide investigator who is respected and even feared by her colleagues.

- Karan Veer Mehra - Rajhans “Raj”

A 27-year-old officer who has been moved to the Mumbai branch of the investigation unit in the homicide department. He is young, strikingly handsome, classically heroic, strong-minded and intrinsically intelligent. He knows he is charming and disarming and uses it well but he is never frivolous. Being the bright and skilled investigator that he is, Rajhans is looking forward to making his own place in the homicide department. He is friendly and popular and he instantly gets along with everyone, charming men and women alike.

- Mohit Malik - Amit
- Kunal Verma - Veer
- Swati Taldar - Saloni
- Sumit Vats - Chirag
- Nagesh Bhonsle - Nagesh
- Neha Gadoria - Pakhi
- Pankit Thakker
- Iqbal Azad
- Dayanand Shetty - Daya (a friend from CID)
