= Gandhigiri (film) =

2016 Bollywood film directed by Sanoj Mishra

- Directed by: Sanoj Mishra
- Written by: Kumar Manjul
- Produced by: Pratap Singh Yadav; Manoj B. Bhatt
- Starring: Om Puri; Sanjay Mishra; Akshay Singh; Mukesh Tiwari; Dolly Chawla; Meghna Haldar; Rishi Bhutani; Vikrant Anand
- Cinematography: Ravi Chandan; Neetu Iqbal; Ashok Saroj
- Edited by: Archit D Rastogi
- Music by: Sahil Rayyan; Shivam Pathak
- Production company: Aagman Films Pvt. Ltd.
- Release date: 14 October 2016 (India)
- Running time: 128 minutes
- Country: India
- Language: Hindi

Gandhigiri is a 2016 Indian Hindi-Language film directed by Sanoj Mishra and produced by Pratap Singh Yadav.

== Synopsis ==
The film tells the story of Rai Saheb, a Non-Resident Indian who returns to India. He is a strong believer in the principles given by Gandhiji. His father played an active role in the freedom struggle and was closely associated with him. In India, he meets four different people who have taken the wrong path due to various circumstances. Saheb makes them understand the importance of Gandhi's principles. Additionally, it exhibits how Gandhian values continue to remain relevant and can bring peace if implemented effectively.

== Cast ==
- Om Puri as Rai Saheb
- Sanjay Mishra as Bakait Singh
- Brijesh Karniwal as Bansi
- Anupam Shyam as Kranti Pandey
- Mukesh Tiwari as Natvarlal
- Meghna Haldar as Jayanti
- Dolly Chawala as Disha
- Amit Shukla as Inspector
- Rishi Bhutani as Yuvraj
- Ravi Singh as Rajaram Pandey
- Ram Sujan Singh as Salfas Baba
- Naveen Sharma as Dhananjay Panday
- Vikrant Anand (guest appearance)
- Vijay Raaz (Narrator)
- Virendra Singh as Mohammed Khalil
- Niranjan Chaubey as Deendayal
- Anita Sahgal as Yuvraj Mother
- Rakesh Tripathi as Daya Nai
- Yashartha Srivastav
- Naveen Sharma
- Aditya Roy

== Production ==
Gandhigiri was produced by Aagman Films Pvt. Ltd. and directed by Sanoj Mishra. The singers were Ankit Tiwari, Sunidhi Chouhan, Mohammad Irfaan, Sujata Majumdar and Masha. Editing was by Archit D Rastogi. The Sound was engineered by Subhash Sahoo. Background Score was composed by Salil Amrute. The associate director was Vikas Kumar Singh. Postproduction was handled by Dl & VFX - After Studio.

The film was shot in Lucknow, Raebareli, Uttar Pradesh.

== Reviews ==
The film received negative reviews. The Indian Express stated that it was "a pure crime"; according to Shalini Lingar, it showed too many sex scenes and did not effectively convey the message of the film. Mihir Bhanage from the Times of India wrote in his review that 'Gandhigiri can be given a miss'.

== Impact ==
According to Surya Agarwal from Hindustan Times, the sale of Gandhi Topi and Kurta went up due to this film.
