= Sumit Vats =

Indian actor (born 1981)

- सुमित वत्स
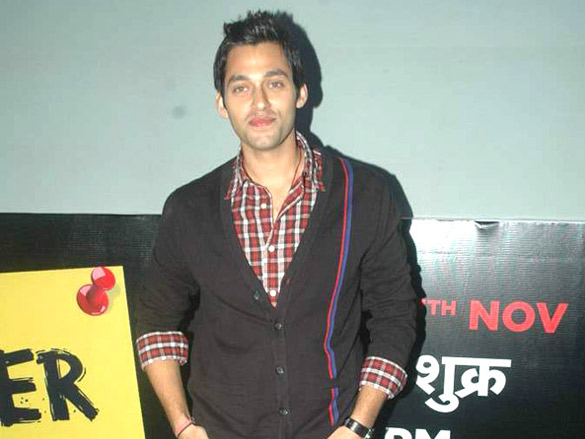
- Vats in 2014.
- Born: 17 March 1981 (age 45); New Delhi, India
- Other names: Rishi, Ricky Diwan
- Citizenship: Indian
- Education: Masters in Journalism (MJMC)
- Alma mater: Bhartiya Vidya Bhavan
- Occupation: Actor
- Years active: 2009 – Present
- Known for: Acting lead role in Zee tv's daily soap opera "Hitler didi"
- Notable work: Rishi Kumar in Hitler didi Happy Singh in Ram-Ratan(Bollywood Movie)
- Television: Hitler didi, Ajab gajab ghar jamai, C.I.D(Sony tv), Karol bagh, Mukti-bandhan, Surya-The super cop
- Height: 174 cm (5 ft 8 1/2 in)
- Title: Kirayedar(Rishi Kumar), Rishi bhaiya, R.K., Mr.Jugadu, Mr. Shayar, Kulfiwala, Kanji aankh wala, Dubhashiya

Sumit Vats (born 17 March 1981) is an Indian actor. He is known for playing the lead role of Rishi in Hitler Didi on Zee TV.

== Personal life ==
Sumit was born on 17 March 1982 (confirmed by Sumit Vats) and brought up in Delhi. He did his graduation from Bhagat Singh College, Delhi and his postgraduation in journalism from Bharatiya Vidya Bhavan. After his last show Ajab Gajab Ghar Jamai aired on 13 feb 2015 on big magic Sumit became disappear from TV industry and his interests moved him towards Indian philosophy and spirituality. Sumit became very much philosophic and spiritual as well as he inclined towards literature. By his social media and Instagram posts one can easily understand his deep interest in philosophy, spirituality and literature. Sumit Vats got tremendous popularity by playing the character of "Rishi Kumar" in his Zee TV's daily soap opera Hitler Didi. He showed his great acting skills in the show. Sumit has chosen to stay away from the glamour and stardom of the film and TV industry. Sumit seemed to develop deep inclination towards Osho Rajneesh and Lord Gautama Buddha philosophy. His last work as an actor could be seen in the Bollywood movie Ramratan released on 6 October 2017 in which he played the role of Happy Singh.

== Career ==
Sumit made his career with the role of Dwarak in Kashi – Ab Na Rahe Tera Kagaz Kora on Imagine TV. He also played in 12/24 Karol Bagh as Raman on Zee TV, Surya The Super Cop as Investigating Officer Chirag on Sony TV and Mukti Bandhan on Colors TV as Jimmy & Chintoo Chautala in BIG Magic's show Ajab Gajab Ghar Jamai. His daily soap opera Hitler didi (Sister Hitler) aired on Zee TV from 7 November 2011 to 2 August 2013 and was dubbed in Arabic, French, and English. The Arabic version aired on Zee Aflam in Dubai and the Middle East from 18 December 2014. Vats plays the role of 'Happy Singh' in the Bollywood movie Ramratan, released on 6 October 2017.He also appeared in The Big Bull as a Hari vyas.

== Filmography ==
=== Television ===
Year	Show	Role	Channel	Notes
2009	12/24 Karol Bagh	Groom's Friend in Marriage (Cameo Role only Episode No 6)	Zee TV	
2010	Kashi – Ab Na Rahe Tera Kagaz Kora	Dwarak	Imagine TV	
2011	Surya The Super Cop	Chirag	Sony TV	
2011	Mukti Bandhan	Jimmy Jockey	Colors TV	
2011–2013	Hitler Didi	Rishi Kumar /Ricky Diwan	Zee TV	
2014–2015	Ajab Gajab Ghar Jamai	Chintoo Chautala	Big Magic	

=== Films ===
Year	Title	Role	Notes
2017	Ramratan	Happy Singh	
2021	The Big Bull	Hari Vyas	

== Awards ==
Year	Award	Category	Role	Show	Result
2011	Zee Rishtey Awards	Favourite Nayi Jodi	Rishi and Indira	Hitler Didi	Won
2012	Indian Telly Awards	Fresh New Face – Male	Rishi	Hitler Didi	Nominated
2013	Indian Telly Awards	Best Actor in a Lead Role – Jury	Rishi	Hitler Didi	Nominated
