= Sanoj Mishra =

Indian film director (born 1977)

- Born: 11 August 1977 (age 49); Haidergarh, Uttar Pradesh, India
- Education: Shia PG College, Lucknow (Master's in Sociology)
- Occupations: Film director, screenwriter
- Years active: 2014–present
- Known for: Gandhigiri; Ram Ki Janmabhoomi; The Diary of West Bengal
- Spouse: Shruti Mishra
- Website: sanojmishrafilms.com

Sanoj Mishra (born 11 August 1977) is an Indian film director and screenwriter known for his work in Hindi films such as Gandhigiri, Ram Ki Janmabhoomi and The Diary of West Bengal.

== Early life ==
Sanoj Mishra was born and raised in Haidergarh, Barabanki district, Uttar Pradesh. He holds a master's degree in sociology from Shia PG College, Lucknow, according to his official website.

== Career ==
Mishra's directorial debut in Hindi cinema was Betaab in 2014. Subsequent directorial efforts include Gandhigiri (2016), Ram Ki Janmabhoomi (2019), Lafange Nawab (2019), Srinagar (2022), Ghaznavi (2023), Shashank (2023) and The Diary of West Bengal (2024). He has also served as writer on several of his films, including the latter.

== Controversies ==
Ram Ki Janmabhoomi, which revolves around the Ram Mandir issue, faced a legal challenge prior to its release. A petition was filed in the Supreme Court of India seeking to stall the film's release, claiming it would interfere with ongoing mediation in the Ayodhya land dispute case. In March 2019, the Delhi High Court first, and the Supreme Court of India, ultimately refused to block the release, stating there was no connection between the mediation and the film. The film also faced a fatwa issued by the All India Ulama Board.

The Diary of West Bengal, which deals with alleged forced conversions, sparked controversy and led to an FIR being filed against Mishra. Kolkata Police summoned Mishra for questioning in connection with the film but Mishra stated that the film was based on well-researched facts.

=== Arrest for alleged rape ===
On March 31, 2025, he was arrested in Ghaziabad, following the rejection of his bail by the Delhi High Court. He faces charges of raping a 28-year-old aspiring actress over four years, allegedly luring her with film roles and marriage promises, forcing her into a live-in relationship, and making her undergo multiple abortions. A First information report was filed on March 6, 2024, supported by medical evidence and the complainant's statement.

== Filmography ==
Filmography of Sanoj Mishra
Year	Title	Role(s)	Notes	References
2014	Betaab	Director		
2016	Gandhigiri	Director, actor		
2018	Tarana – The Black Story	Director		
2019	Ram Ki Janmabhoomi	Director		
2019	Lafange Nawab	Director		
2022	Srinagar	Director, writer		
2023	Ghaznavi	Director, writer		
2023	Shashank	Director, writer		
2024	The Diary of West Bengal	Director, writer		
2025	Kashi to Kashmir	Director, writer	Completed	
