= Daisy Shah =

Indian actress, dancer and model (born 1984)

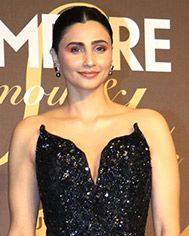
- Shah in 2025
- Born: 25 August 1984 (age 41); Bombay, Maharashtra, India
- Occupations: Actress; model; dancer; choreographer
- Years active: 2003–present

Daisy Shah (born 25 August 1984) is an Indian actress, model and dancer who primarily appears in Hindi and Kannada films. She has worked as an assistant to choreographer Ganesh Acharya. Her first breakthrough came when she was selected to play the lead role in the 2011 Kannada film Bhadra. She then appeared opposite Salman Khan in the 2014 Hindi film Jai Ho. In 2015, she was a part of Hate Story 3. In 2023 she participated in Fear Factor: Khatron Ke Khiladi 13 .

== Early life ==
Shah belongs to a Gujarati family, but was born and brought up in Bombay (now Mumbai), Maharashtra. Shah won the Miss Photogenic award in the MS Dombivli contest at a local mall when she was in 10th class. She studied arts at Mumbai's Khalsa College.

== Career ==
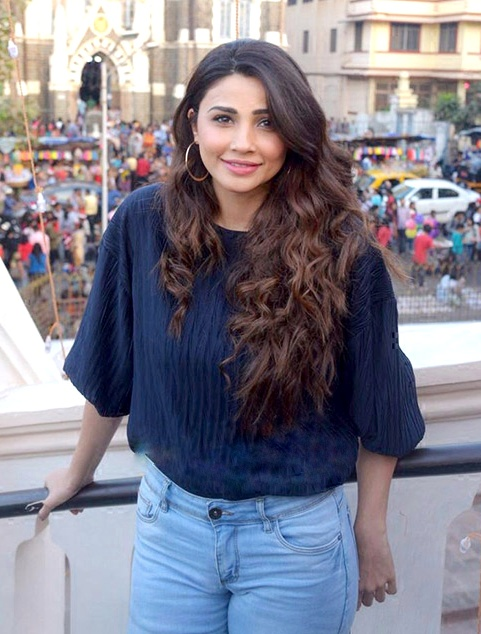
Shah in 2018

Shah first worked as an assistant to choreographer Ganesh Acharya in films like Zameen and Khakee and later started modelling, doing photo shoots and print ads. Kannada director Harsha approached her for the film Chingari. She also did an item song ("Neeli Lugadi") in the Hindi film Khuda Kasam, starring Sunny Deol and Tabu. Shah made her film debut with the 2011 Kannada film Bhadra, where News18 noted, "Daisy has shown her prowess as a dancer and adds a little bit of oomph to the film." The same year, she played Ammu in Bodyguard, the remake of the Malayalam film of the same name. She then shot for two item songs in the Kannada film Bachchan and the Hindi film Bloody Isshq.

In 2014, Shah made her Hindi film debut with the commercially successful film Jai Ho opposite Salman Khan. Bollywood Hungama wrote, "Daisy Shah doesn't really get much scope, but you cannot ignore the fact that she's a terrific and graceful dancer." The same year, she appeared in the Kannada film Aakramana. In 2015, she played Kaya opposite Karan Singh Grover, in Hate Story 3, a box office success. India Today said, "Daisy Shah tries to breathe life into her Kaaya, but falls light years short of her destination."

After appearing in Ramratan, Shah portrayed Sanjana in the 2018 film Race 3, a critical failure but a commercial success. The 2019 Gujarati film Gujarat 11, earned her praises for her portrayal of a sub-inspector and football coach. Times of India noted her "earnest performance" and said that she has given "this role her 100%".

In 2023, Shah made her television debut as a contestant with the stunt reality show, Fear Factor: Khatron Ke Khiladi 13. She ended up at the 11th place.

== Filmography ==
Key
†	Denotes films that have not yet been released

=== Films ===
Year	Title	Role	Language	Notes	Ref.
2001	Rehnaa Hai Terre Dil Mein	Herself	Hindi		
2002	Chor Machaaye Shor	Herself	Hindi	Special appearance in "Pehen Ke Chola Jawaani Wala"	
2002	Om Jai Jagadish	Herself	Hindi	Special appearance in "Happy Days"	
2003	Tere Naam	Herself	Hindi	Co-Dancer with Salman Khan in"Lagan Lagi"	
2004	Masti	Herself	Hindi	Co-Dancer in title track song "Masti"	
2006	Humko Deewana Kar Gaye	Herself	Hindi	Co-Dancer in song "Rockstar"	
2006	Jaane Hoga Kya	Herself	Hindi	Co-Dancer in song "Teri Mast Mast Jawani"	
2007	Pori	Unnamed	Tamil		
2009	Malai Malai	Unnamed	Tamil	Special appearance	
2010	Vandae Maatharam	Herself	Malayalam-Tamil	Special appearance	
2010	Khuda Kasam	Herself	Hindi	Special appearance in song "Neeli Lugadi"	
2011	Bhadra	Kavya	Kannada		
2011	Bodyguard	Ammu	Kannada		
2012	Department	Herself	Hindi	Co-Dancer with Sanjay Dutt in "Thodisi Pee Lee Hai"	
2013	Gajendra	Unnamed	Kannada		
2013	Bloody Isshq	Herself	Hindi	Special appearance in a song	
2013	Bachchan	Herself	Kannada	Special appearance in a song "Mysore Pakalli"	
2014	Jai Ho	Rinky Shah	Hindi		
2014	Spark	Herself	Hindi	Special appearance in a song "Meri Jawani Sode Ki Botal"	
2014	Aakramana	Nireeksha	Kannada		
2015	Hate Story 3	Kaya Sharma	Hindi		
2017	Ramratan	Ratan Rathod	Hindi		
2018	Race 3	Sanjana Singh	Hindi		
2019	Gujarat 11	Divya Chauhan	Gujarati	Gujarati film	
2022	Daagadi Chawl 2	Herself	Marathi	Special appearance in song "Raghu Pinjryat Aala"	
2023	Mystery of the Tattoo	Aathmika	Hindi		
2026	Bihu Attack		Hindi		

=== Television ===
Year	Title	Role	Notes	Ref.
2023	Fear Factor: Khatron Ke Khiladi 13	Contestant	10th place	
2024	Red Room	Tia	Web series	
2026	Alliance	Contestant	Eliminated in finale week	
TBA	The Ghost of Gandhi †	TBA	Web series; Completed	

== Awards and nominations ==
Year	Award	Category	Work	Result	Ref
2015	BIG Star Entertainment Awards	Most Entertaining Film Debut - Female	Jai Ho	Nominated	
2015	ETC Bollywood Business Awards	Highest Grossing Debut Actress	Jai Ho	Won	
2021	Filmfare Awards East	Star with a Cause	—N/a	Won	

== See also ==
- List of Hindi film actresses
