= Syed Wasim Rizvi =

Indian filmmaker and politician

Jitendra Narayan Singh

Central Shia Board of Waqf, Uttar Pradesh
- In office 1995–2020
- Succeeded by: Ali Zaidi

Personal details
- Born: Syed Waseem Rizvi Lucknow, Uttar Pradesh, India
- Spouse: Radha Awasthi
- Occupation: Debater; Film producer Politician

Jitendra Narayan Singh (born Syed Waseem Rizvi) is the former member and chairman of the Shia Central Waqf Board of Uttar Pradesh, India. He is known for filing a petition in India's Supreme Court, suggesting reform of the Quran as well as producing the Bollywood films Ram Ki Janmabhoomi and The Diary of West Bengal.

== Political career ==
He was elected a Samajwadi Party (SP) corporator from the Kashmiri Mohalla ward of Old City in Lucknow in 2000, and in 2008, became a member of the Shia Central Waqf Board. In 2012, Tyagi was expelled from the SP for six years after falling out with Shia cleric Kalbe Jawad, who accused him of misappropriation of funds. Tyagi termed these charges as "cooked up" motivated by the desire to "weaken his argument". Tyagi later got relief from the court and was reinstated.

== Controversies ==
In January 2018, Tyagi wrote to the Chief Minister of Uttar Pradesh and the Prime Minister of India, seeking the abolition of Madrasas and said that some of them act as breeding grounds for terrorists instead of ensuring jobs for Muslims. In response, a Bareilly based religious outfit All India Faizan-e-Madina Council (AIFMC) announced a bounty of Rs 1,000,786 and a free Hajj trip for anyone who beheads Tyagi. In January 2020, Tyagi said that, "Some people believe that childbirth is a natural process and should not be interfered with. To give birth to more children like animals is harmful to society and country. It will be good for the country if a law is implemented for population control." In an interview he said that he did not like being called a Muslim, which to him was like being called a "cruel, wild beast", he added that he was very much a Muslim, but if that placed him in that same category as the Taliban he would rather identify himself as a human. In another interview, he declared that he has left Islam.

=== Petition in Supreme Court ===
On 12 March 2021, Tyagi filed a petition in the Supreme Court, where he appealed to remove 26 verses from the Quran. He has claimed in the petition that these verses promote violence among Muslims. The petition says these 26 verses were not part of the original Quran but were inserted at a later stage. In response, there has been condemnation from Muslim bodies of both Shia and Sunni sects of Islam. They have demanded Tyagi's arrest. The ruling BJP has also protested his petition. A lawyer from Moradabad announced a reward of Rs 11 lakh for "beheading" Tyagi, while Shiane Haider-e-Karrar Welfare Association, a Muslim organisation in Uttar Pradesh, declared a Rs 20,000 reward for Tyagi's beheading.

=== Conversion to Hinduism ===
Rizvi chose to undergo religious conversion to Hinduism on 6 December 2021. He changed his name to "Jitendra Narayan Singh Tyagi".

=== Haridwar hate speech case ===
In January 2022, Rizvi was arrested by Uttarakhand Police for an anti-Islam hate speech at Haridwar Dharam Sansad. His was the first arrest in Haridwar case. He got interim bail in May 2022 due to medical reasons. In 19 April 2025, he was acquitted of these charges.

== Works ==
=== Books ===
- Mohammed - Released in November 2021, in which Tyagi has given his viewpoint on why Islam came about and why he considers it a violent religion. He has claimed that he has referred to 350 Islamic books while writing his book.

=== Films ===
- Ram Ki Janmabhoomi
- The Diary of West Bengal
