= Palak Muchhal =

Indian singer, philanthropist (born 1992)

Palak Muchal
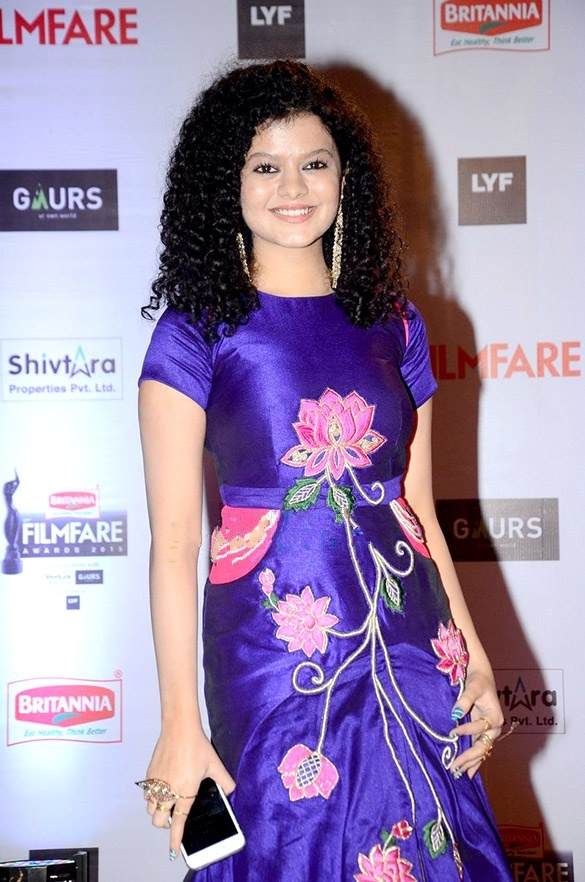
- Palak at 61st Filmfare Awards in 2016
- Born: 30 March 1992 (age 34); Indore, Madhya Pradesh, India
- Education: M Com
- Occupations: Singer; lyricist
- Years active: 2011–present
- Spouses: Mithoon (m. 2022)
- Parents: Rajkumar Muchhal (father); Amita Muchhal (mother)
- Relatives: Palash Muchhal (Brother)
- Honours: Pradhan Mantri Rashtriya Bal Puraskar (2000); Doctorate Degree by the American University USA for Global Peace (2021)
- Musical career
- Genres: Hindustani classical music; Filmi
- Instrument: Vocals

Palak Muchhal Sharma (born 30 March 1992) is an Indian playback singer and lyricist. Muchhal performs as a playback singer across Hindi films and other Indian film industries. She has rendered her voice in Hindi films such as Ek Tha Tiger (2012), Aashiqui 2 (2013), Kick (2014) and Action Jackson (2014) Prem Ratan Dhan Payo (2015) M.S. Dhoni: The Untold Story (2016) Kaabil (2017), Baaghi 2 (2018) and Pal Pal Dil Ke Paas (2019). Her rendition of the song "Kaun Tujhe" from the film"M.S. Dhoni: The Untold Story has earned her much praise from fans as well as prominent personalities in the music industry. On 6 November 2022, she married music composer Mithoon, with whom she had earlier worked on the soundtrack of Aashiqui 2. Alongside her brother Palash Muchhal, she has also done philanthropic work by raising funds through her stage shows for children who need financial assistance for treatment of heart diseases.

== Background ==
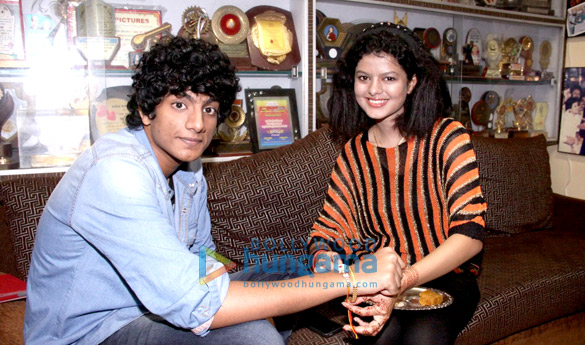
Muchhal with brother Palash Muchhal on Raksha Bandhan 2013

Palak Muchhal was born on 30 March 1992 into a Maheshwari Marwari family in Indore. Her mother, Amita Muchhal, is a homemaker and her father, Rajkumar Muchhal, works for a private firm. She has a younger brother, Palash Muchhal. She did her schooling from Queens College Indore. In May 2013 Muchhal stated that she was doing her final year of B.Com from a college in Indore.

== Bollywood career ==
Muchhal released six non-filmi albums prior to her adulthood. In 2001, when she was nine, her first album "Child For Children" was released by Tips Music. In 2003, her second album Palken was released. In later years she released her other albums Aao Tumhe Chand Per Le Jaaye, Beti Hu Mahakal Ki, and Dil Ke Liye. In 2011, her Jai Jai Dev Ganesh album was released by T-Series. Muchhal moved to Mumbai from Indore in late 2006 to find opportunities in Bollywood for her singing career. She sang her first Bollywood song for the October 2011 movie Damadamm!, receiving generally positive reviews. She sang her second song, "Pyaar Ke Silsile", a month later for movie Na Jaane Kabse. The music in Na Jaane Kabse, and the movie also, received bad reviews. Muchhal was an acquaintance of actor Salman Khan. Khan had recommended her name earlier to music director Sajid–Wajid for his film Veer. Khan had also recommended her name to Yash Raj Banner. Following this, Muchhal dubbed the song "Laapata" with KK for Yash Raj banner which was included in 2012 blockbuster movie Ek Tha Tiger. The song was filmed on Salman Khan and Katrina Kaif. The song was a hit and introduced her to Bollywood.

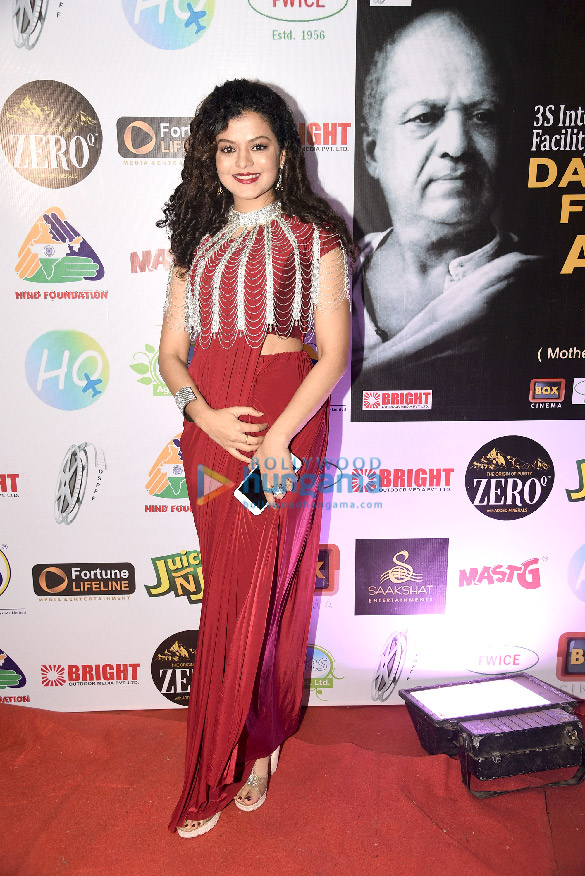
Palak Muchhal at Dadasahab phalke Award 2019

Later that year in 2012 she sang "Nainon Ne Nainon Se" song for the movie From Sydney with Love, receiving favorable reviews. In early 2013, Muchhal sang two songs, composed by Mithoon and Jeet Gannguli, for the movie Aashiqui 2. Aashiqui 2 music received generally positive reviews, becoming her second hit after Ek Tha Tiger with the song "Chahun Main Yaa Na" becoming her special signature start to the Bollywood industry. Muchhal has also sung a song "Tui Borsha Bikeler Dheu" in Bengali for the April 2013 Bengali movie Rocky. After her debut as a singer in Bollywood, she sang several songs of Himesh Reshammiya's composition. In 2014, she sang with Mika Singh for Reshammiya's song "Jumme Ki Raat", which became the biggest hit of the year. Later she also sang the same with Salman Khan. She was also the lead singer in the 2015 Salman Khan film Prem Ratan Dhan Payo. In 2016, she lent her voice for "Kaun Tujhe" of Amaal Mallik in M.S. Dhoni: The Untold Story, one of the top female songs of the year. Most of her songs until date are compositions of Reshammiya, Gannguli, Mithoon and Amaal Mallik. Her Kannada song "Enammi Enammi" with Vijay Prakash was a big chartbuster in 2018.

In 2023, the song Naiyo Lagda from the movie Kisi Ka Bhai Kisi Ki Jaan was also a big chartbuster of the year.

== Charity work ==
=== 1997–2000 ===
At times... [I missed my normal childhood], but then, it dawns on me that even if I lose my childhood, it's okay. Playing with friends is not more important than saving a life.

— Palak Muchhal (in 2007)

Muchhal became a member of Kalyanji–Anandji Little Star, a group of young singers, when she was four years old. During the Kargil War of 1999, when aged seven, she spent a week singing at shops in her home city, Indore, to raise funds for the families of deceased Indian soldiers. Her efforts received substantial coverage in Indian media and she raised ₹25,000 (US$810). Later that year, she sang to raise funds for victims of the 1999 Odisha cyclone.

Her decision to use her voice to help others was triggered when she saw poor children using their clothes to clean train compartments. Around the same time, teachers at Nidhi Bal Vinay Mandir, an Indore-based school, approached Muchhal and her parents with a request for a charity show to raise funds for their pupil, Lokesh, who was suffering from a congenital heart defect. Lokesh's father was an impoverished footwear shop-owner and was unable to afford the high cost of heart surgery. Muchhal and her parents agreed to arrange a show and in March 2000, she used a street vendor's cart as a stage for the event and collected ₹51,000 (US$1,600) towards the cost of surgery. The attendant publicity prompted Bangalore-based cardiologist, Devi Prasad Shetty, to operate on Lokesh free of charge. Muchhal's parents advertised in local newspapers to promote donations toward heart surgery for children like Lokesh. The outcome of this was a list of 33 children in need of heart surgery.

A series of charity shows were arranged later in that year, from which ₹225,000 (US$7,200) were raised. This money was used to provide heart surgery for five children in Bangalore and Bhandari Hospital Indore. To help Muchhal in her efforts to save lives of children at relatively low cost, T. Choithram Hospital of Indore halved the cost of surgery from ₹80,000 (US$2,600) to ₹40,000 (US$1,300) and one of its surgeons, Dhiraj Gandhi, decided to waive his fee for cases brought in by Muchhal.

=== 2001–2010 ===
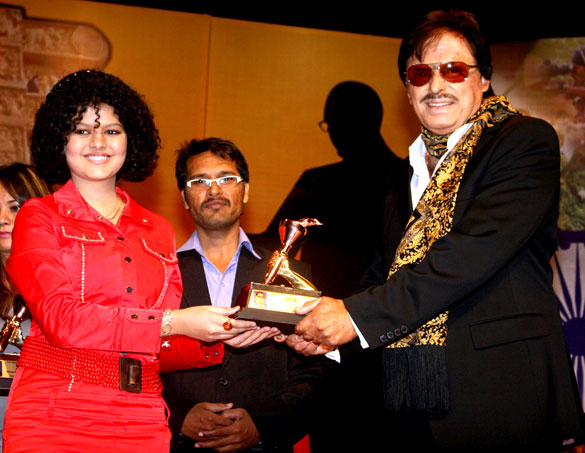
Muchhal with Sanjay Khan at 2nd Babasaheb Ambedkar Awards 2010

Since 2000, Muchhal has travelled extensively in India and abroad for her charity show, which is billed in Hindi as "Dil Se Dil Tak" ("From heart to heart") and in English as "Save Little Hearts". Her younger brother, Palash, performs in the same shows with the intent of raising funds for children who have kidney ailments. On average, Muchhal sings around 40 songs in each show which includes popular Bollywood songs, Ghazals and Bhajans. Muchhal can sing in 17 different languages which include Hindi, Sanskrit, Gujarati, Odia, Assamese, Rajasthani, Bengali, Bhojpuri, Punjabi, Marathi, Kannada, Telugu, Tamil, Sindhi and Malayalam.

Palak was also a star at Maheboob College, Secunderabad and sang there. Both Palak and Palash sang on different occasions. By this they were brought up and built their career.

In 2001, Muchhal raised around one million rupees for the victims of 2001 Gujarat earthquake. In July 2003, Muchhal offered financial assistance through her charity funds to the parents of a two-year-old Pakistani girl who had a hole in the heart. Muchhal's charity organisation is named "Palak Muchhal Heart Foundation". As of March 2006 this foundation had financially assisted 200 children in undergoing heart surgery. By the end of the year 2006 Muchhal had raised ₹1.2 crore (US$130,000) for this foundation which were used to save the lives of 234 children. To ensure that operations of children do not stop due to lack of money, Bhandari Hospital in Indore has allowed an overdraft of up to one million rupees to Palak Muchhal Heart Foundation. In 2006 Muchhal was one of the five heroic stories broadcast by Star Gold channel as part of its "Rang De Basanti Salaam" (Salute to Color of Sacrifice) initiative. By June 2009 Muchhal had staged 1,460 charity shows across the world, which had raised ₹1.71 crore (US$180,000) for Palak Muchhal Heart Foundation. These funds helped to save the lives of 338 children.

Doctors allow Muchhal to be present in the operating theatre. She has her own surgical gown in the hospital and when the operation takes place she chants Jain Navkar Mantra. Muchhal and her parents do not receive any financial benefits from the charity shows but she receives a doll for every child whose life she helps make better through her efforts.

=== 2011–present ===
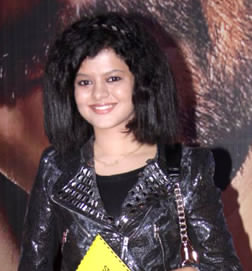
Palak Muchhal at Policegiri charity screening in July 2013

In 2011, Muchhal entered Bollywood as a professional playback singer but her efforts to help child heart patients continued. In August 2015, funds raised by her has helped to save the lives of 800 children. As of October 2020, she with her brother has saved 2,200 lives of children. As of March 8, 2024, a total of 2986 lives have been saved so far by Palak and her brother Palash.

== Personal life ==
Muchhal married Mithoon, a music composer on 6 November 2022 with whom she worked earlier on the music of Aashiqui 2.

== Discography ==
=== Hindi film songs ===
Year	Album	Song(s)	Composer(s)	Co-singer(s)	Ref.
2011	Damadamm!	"Damadamm"	Himesh Reshammiya	Himesh Reshammiya, Vinit Singh, Alam Gir Khan, Shabab Sabri, Sabina Shaikh, Rubina Shaikh and Punnu Brar	
2011	Na Jaane Kabse	"Pyaar Ke Silsile"	Jatin Pandit		
2012	Ek Tha Tiger	"Laapata"	Sohail Sen	KK	
2012	From Sydney with Love	"Nainon Ne Nainon Se"	Sohail Sen	Sohail Sen	
2013	Aashiqui 2	"Meri Aashiqui"	Mithoon	Arijit Singh	
2013	Aashiqui 2	"Chaahun Main Ya Naa"	Jeet Gannguli	Arijit Singh	
2013	Policegiri	"Chura Ke Le Ja"	Himesh Reshammiya	Yashraj Kapil	
2013	Policegiri	"Tirat Meri Tu"	Himesh Reshammiya	Vinit Singh, Shabab Sabri	
2013	Zanjeer	"Lamhaa Tera Mera"	Chirantan Bhatt	Wajhi Farooki	
2013	Mickey Virus	"Aankhon Hi Aankhon Ne" (Duet Version)		Mohit Chauhan	
2013	Mickey Virus	"Aankhon Hi Aankhon Ne" (Female Version)			
2013	R... Rajkumar	"Dhokha Dhadi"	Pritam Chakraborty	Arijit Singh	
2014	Jai Ho	"Photocopy"	Sajid–Wajid	Himesh Reshammiya, Keerthi Sagathia	
2014	Jai Ho	"Photocopy" (Remix)	Sajid–Wajid	Himesh Reshammiya, Keerthi Sagathia	
2014	Karle Pyaar Karle	"Karle Pyaar Karle"	Meet Bros Anjjan	Benny Dayal, Monali Thakur	
2014	Karle Pyaar Karle	"Teri Saanson Mein"	Rashid Khan	Arijit Singh	
2014	Dishkiyaoon	"Tu Hi Hai Aashiqui" (Duet Version)	Palash Muchhal	Arijit Singh	
2014	Dishkiyaoon	"Nachle Tu"	Palash Muchhal	Mika Singh	
2014	The Xposé	"Ice Cream Khaungi"	Himesh Reshammiya	Himesh Reshammiya, Yo Yo Honey Singh	
2014	Humshakals	"Piya Ke Bazaar"	Himesh Reshammiya	Himesh Reshammiya, Shalmali Kholgade	
2014	Humshakals	"Khol De Dil Ki Khidki"	Himesh Reshammiya	Mika Singh	
2014	Kick	"Jumme Ki Raat"	Himesh Reshammiya	Mika Singh	
2014	Kick	"Jumme Ki Raat" (Version 2)	Himesh Reshammiya	Salman Khan	
2014	Action Jackson	"Dhoom Dham"	Himesh Reshammiya	Ankit Tiwari	
2015	Ishq Ke Parindey	"Tumse Mil Ke"	Vijay Vermaa	Javed Ali	
2015	Ishq Ke Parindey	"Rab se Maangi"	Vijay Vermaa	Javed Ali	
2015	Gabbar Is Back	"Teri Meri Kahaani"	Chirantan Bhatt	Arijit Singh	
2015	Hero	"O Khuda"	Amaal Mallik		
2015	Khamoshiyan	"Baatein Ye Kabhi Na" (Female Version)	Jeet Gannguli		
2015	Mr. X	"Teri Khushboo" (Female Version)	Jeet Gannguli		
2015	Baahubali: The Beginning (D)	"Panchhi Bole"	M. M. Keeravani		
2015	Rudhramadevi (D)	"Pushpa Koi Viksit Huya"	Ilaiyaraaja		
2015	Thoda Lutf Thoda Ishq	"Pyaar Hua Jab Tujhse" (Female Version)	Vikram Khajuria		
2015	Uvaa	"Ishq Fobiya"	Rashid Khan	Mohammed Irfan, Bhanu Pratap Singh	
2015	Luckhnowi Ishq	"Bomb Kudi"	Raaj Aashoo	Pratibha Baghel	
2015	Luckhnowi Ishq	"Bomb Kudi" (Featuring Labh Janjua)	Raaj Aashoo	Labh Janjua, Amit Mishra, Pratibha Baghel	
2015	Prem Ratan Dhan Payo	"Prem Ratan Dhan Payo"	Himesh Reshammiya		
2015	Prem Ratan Dhan Payo	"Jab Tum Chaho"	Himesh Reshammiya	Mohammed Irfan, Darshan Raval	
2015	Prem Ratan Dhan Payo	"Aaj Unse Kehna Hai"	Himesh Reshammiya	Shaan, Aishwarya Majumdar	
2016	Sanam Teri Kasam	"Sanam Teri Kasam"	Himesh Reshammiya	Ankit Tiwari	
2016	Sanam Teri Kasam	"Sanam Teri Kasam" (Reprise Version)	Himesh Reshammiya	Mohammed Irfan	
2016	Ishq Forever	"Ishq Forever"	Nadeem Saifi	Jubin Nautiyal	
2016	Ishq Forever	"Bilkul Socha Na Tha"	Nadeem Saifi	Rahat Fateh Ali Khan	
2016	Sanam Re	"Hua Hain Aaj Pehli Baar"	Amaal Mallik	Armaan Malik, Amaal Mallik	
2016	Jab Tum Kaho	"Ab Tu Hi Tu"	Anuj Garg	Shafqat Amanat Ali Khan	
2016	Awesome Mausam	"Tere Naina Mere Naino Se"	Komal Aran Atariya	Shaan	
2016	Ki & Ka	"Kabir Most Wanted Munda"	Meet Bros	Meet Bros, Arjun Kapoor	
2016	Traffic	"Keh Bhi De"	Mithoon	Benny Dayal	
2016	Traffic	"Door Na Jaa"	Mithoon		
2016	Do Lafzon Ki Kahani	"Jeena Marna" (Female Version)	Babli Haque		
2016	Luv U Alia	"Sapne"	Jassie Gift	Ashwin Bhandare	
2016	Rustom	"Dekha Hazaro Dafaa"	Jeet Gannguli	Arijit Singh	
2016	Raaz Reboot	"Hummein Tummein Jo Tha"	Jeet Gannguli	Papon	
2016	M.S. Dhoni: The Untold Story	"Kaun Tujhe"	Amaal Mallik		
2016	Mmirsa	"Naio Jeena Tere Bina"	Meet Bros Anjjan	Mohit Chauhan	
2017	Kaabil	"Kaabil Hoon"	Rajesh Roshan	Jubin Nautiyal	
2017	Laali Ki Shaadi Mein Laaddoo Deewana	"Rog Jaane"	Vipin Patwa	Rahat Fateh Ali Khan	
2017	Sweetiee Weds NRI	"Musafir"	Arko	Atif Aslam	
2017	Sweetiee Weds NRI	"Wedding"	Palash Muchhal	Sahid Mallya	
2017	Sweetiee Weds NRI	"Zindagi Bana Loon"	Palash Muchhal	Palash Muchhal	
2017	Sweetiee Weds NRI	"Kinara"	Palash Muchhal		
2017	Ek Haseena Thi Ek Deewana Tha	All Songs	Nadeem Saifi		
2017	Ranchi Diaries	Thoda Aur	Jeet Gannguli	Arijit Singh	
2017	Toilet: Ek Prem Katha	"Gori Tu Latth Maar"	Manas Shikhar	Sonu Nigam	
2017	Ramratan	Nand Lala	Bappi Lahiri	Bappi Lahiri	
	Babuji Ek Ticket Bambai	Bepanhaa Tum Ko Chahe"	Altaaf Sayyed	Mohit Chauhan	
2018	Ajooba (Animation)	"Ajooba ko Salaam"	Ravindra Jain	Shaan	
2018	Aiyaary	"Yaad Hai"	Ankit Tiwari		
2018	Baaghi 2	"Mundiyan"	Sandeep Shirodkar	Navraj Hans	
2018	Baaghi 2	"Ek Do Teen"(Film Version)	Sandeep Shirodkar		
2018	Kaashi in Search of Ganga	"Betahasha"	Ankit Tiwari	Sonu Nigam	
2018	Loveyatri	"Dholida"	Tanishk Bagchi	Udit Narayan, Neha Kakkar, Raja Hasan	
2018	Mausam Ikrar Ke Do Pal Pyar Ke	"Do Pal Pyar Ke"	Bappi Lahiri	Shaan	
2018	Rashtraputra	"You Are My Life"	Aazaad		
2019	Amavas	"Jab Se Mera Dil"	Sanjeev–Darshan	Armaan Malik	
2019	Amavas	"Dhadkan"	Sanjeev–Darshan	Jubin Nautiyal	
2019	Dream Girl	"Ik Mulaqaat"	Meet Bros	Altamash Faridi	
2019	Hans Ek Sanyog	"Main Hu Tera Tera"	Prekhar Varma		
2019	Lafange Nawab	"Tere Liye Chhodi"	Ali Faisal		
2019	Pal Pal Dil Ke Paas	"Pal Pal Dil Ke Paas"	Sachet-Parampara		
2019	SP Chauhan	"Sadke Jawaan"	Vibhas		
2019	Marjaavaan	"Raghupati"	Tanishk Bagchi		
2020	Gunjan Saxena: The Kargil Girl	"Mann Ki Dori"(Female)	Amit Trivedi		
2020	Haunted Hills	"Har Raahaton"	Sandeep Jaiswal	Gaurav Sandeep	
2020	Suraj Pe Mangal Bhari	"Waareya"(Duet)	Javed–Mohsin		
2020	Suraj Pe Mangal Bhari	"Waareya"(Female)	Javed–Mohsin		
2021	Bhuj: The Pride Of India	Rammo Rammo	Tanishk Bagchi	Udit Narayan, Neeti Mohan	
2021	Shershaah	"Kabhii Tumhhe (Female)"	Javed–Mohsin		
2022	Ardh	"Ishq Ka Manjha"	Palash Muchhal	Armaan Malik	
2022	Rashtra Kavach Om	"Saansein Dene Aana"(Duet)	Chirantan Bhatt	Raj Burman	
2022	Rashtra Kavach Om	"Saansein Dene Aana"(Female)	Chirantan Bhatt		
2022	Middle Class Love	"Naya Pyaar Naya Ehsaas"	Himesh Reshammiya	Jubin Nautiyal	
2022	Prem Geet 3	"Tum Pyaar Ho"	Aslam Keyi	Ankit Tiwari	
2022	Prem Geet 3	"Mujh Mein Bas Jana"	Kalyan Singh	Dev Negi	
2022	Doctor G	Har Jagah Tu (Female)	Sultan Suleman		
	Raksha Bandhan	Tere Saath Hun Mein (Female)	Himesh Reshmmiya		
	Salaam Venky	"Yu Tere Hue Hum"	Mithoon	Jubin Nautiyal	
2023	Mrs. Chatterjee vs Norway	"Ma Ke Dil Se"	Amit Trivedi	Dipiksha Kalita	
2023	Kisi Ka Bhai Kisi Ki Jaan	"Naiyo Lagda"	Himesh Reshammiya	Kamal Khan	
2023	Chatrapathi	"Sukhriya"	Tanishk Bagchi	Ash King	
2023	1920: Horrors of the Heart	"Zaroori Hai"	Puneeth Dixit	Javed Ali	
2023	1920: Horrors of the Heart	"Zaroori Hai (Female)"	Puneeth Dixit		
2023	Kushi (D)	"Aradhya"	Hesham Abdul Wahab	Jubin Nautiyal	
2023	Gadar 2	"Udd Jaa Kaale Kaava (Female)"	Mithoon		
2024	Kaam Chalu Hai	"Lai Bhari"	Palash Muchhal	Javed Ali	
2024	The Heist	"Aaja Bairi"	Nad Sham	Single	
2024	Martin(D)	"Dhadkano mein"	Mani Sharma	Javed Ali	
2024	The Sabarmati Report	"Raja Ram (Female)"	Anu Malik	Single	
2024	Vanvaas	"Bandhan"	Mithoon Sharma	Vishal Mishra	
2025	Deva	"Bas Tera Pyaar Hai(Palak Version)"	Vishal Mishra		
2025	Sikandar	"Hum Aapke Bin (Palak Version)"	Pritam	Single	
2025	Inn Galiyon Mein	"Patang Ki Door (Duet)"	Amal Malik	Armaan Malik	
2025	Andaaz 2	"Tere Bin Kahin Dil Na Lagey"	Nadeem Saifi	Mohammed Irfan	
2025	Andaaz 2	You Are Beautiful	Nadeem Saifi	Javed Ali	
2025	Andaaz 2	Rabba Ishq Na Hove 2.0	Nadeem Saifi		
2025	Andaaz 2	Waqt Ne Kiya Iss Qadar Sitam			
2025	Dhadak 2	"Ye Kaisa Ishq (Palak Version)"	Rochak Kohli		
2026	Border 2	"Mohabbat Ho Gayi Hai"	Anu Malik, Mithoon (recreation)	Sonu Nigam	
	The Kerala Story 2	Kanha	Rahul Suhas		

=== Hindi non-film songs ===
Year	Album	Song	Composer(s)	Co-singer(s)
2014	Arre Diwani (Single)	"Arre Diwani"	Ramesh Roshan	Pankaj Kumar
2017	Kabhi Yaadon Mein	"Kabhi Yaadon Mein"	Abhijit Vaghani	Arijit Singh
2017	Khushi Waali Khushi	"Khushi Waali Khushi"	Shantanu Moitra	
2017	T-Series Acoustics	"Kinara"	Palash Muchhal	Palash Muchhal
2017	T-Series Mixtape	"Kaise Mujhe/Tum Ho Song"	Abhijit Vaghani	Aditya Narayan
2021	Lag Raha Hai Dil Deewana (Single)	"Lag Raha Hai Dil Deewana"	Jeet Ganguli	
2021	Chaap Tilak	"Chaap Tilak"	Shreyas Puranik	Rahul Vaidya
2021-22	Himesh Ke Dil Se	"Tumpe Mar Jaaenge"	Himesh Reshammiya	
2021-22	Himesh Ke Dil Se	"Tum Dill Meinn Ho Mere"	Himesh Reshammiya	
2021	Moods with Melodies	"Yeh Dil Merra Maane Kahaan"	Himesh Reshammiya	Sawai Bhat
2022	Muskuraa Lena Tum (Single)	"Muskuraa Lena Tum"	Shameer Tandon	
	"Yaar Zaahir"	"Yaar Zaahir"	Sandesh Shandilya	Ustad Rashid Khan
2024	Ladki Tu Kamal Ki (Single)	Ladki Tu Kamal Ki	Palash Muchhal	Andre Russell
2025	Tumm Se Tumm Tak	"Tumm Se Tumm Tak"	Nishant-Raja; Sunaad Gowtham	
2025	Le Jayenge Tere Sajna	"Le Jayenge Tere Sajna"	Shabbir Ahmed	Pawan Singh

== Songs in other languages ==
=== Bengali songs ===
Year	Film	Song	Composer(s)	Writer(s)	Co-singer(s)
2013	Rocky	"Tui Borsha Bikeler Dheu"	Jeet Gannguli	Prasenjit Mukherjee	Shaan
2013	Khiladi	"O Humsafar Tor Chokhe"	Shree Pritam		Shaan
2014	Kkoli: A Journey of Love	"Tumi Acho A Shob E"	Meet Bros Anjjan	Rana Mazumdar	Anjan Bhattacharya
2014	Kkoli: A Journey of Love	"Tumi Acho" (MBA Swag Remix)	Meet Bros Anjjan	Rana Mazumdar	Anjan Bhattacharya
2014	Taarkata	"Ochena Ei Jalsa Ghore"	Arfin Rumey	Mahmud Manjur	
2014	Ami Shudhu Cheyechi Tomay	"Obujh Bhalobasha"	Hridoy Khan	Maliha Tajnin Tani	Hridoy Khan
2016	Ki Kore Toke Bolbo	"Ki Kore Bolbo Tomay" (Duet)	Jeet Gannguli		Papon
2016	Ki Kore Toke Bolbo	"Ki Kore Bolbo" (Female version)	Jeet Gannguli		
2016	Prem Ki Bujhini	"Saraswati Biddaboti"	Savvy	Soumyadeb	
2016	Amar Ichchhe Kothay	"Shobai Chole Jabe"	Imran Mahmudul	Zulfiqer Russell	Imran Mahmudul
2017	Dekh Kemon Lage	"Let's Dance Kolkata"	Jeet Gannguli		Jubin Nautiyal
2017	Shrestha Bangali	"Ichhe Dana Mele Diye"	Monty Sharma	Priyo Chatterjee	Armaan Malik
2018	Chitranatte Bithi	"Keno Eto Bhabcho"	Imran Mahmudul	Zulfiqer Russell	Imran Mahmudul
2019	Kidnap	"Monta Katha Sonena"	Jeet Gannguli	Raja Chanda	Goldie Sohel
2022	Shaan	"Cholo Pakhi Hoi"	Ahmmed Humayun	Prosen	Arman Malik

=== Telugu songs ===
Year	Film	Song	Composer(s)	Writer(s)	Co-singer(s)
2014	Nee Jathaga Nenundali	"Nijama Kada"	Jeet Gannguli	Chandrabose	Abhay Jodhpurkar
2014	Nee Jathaga Nenundali	"Ee Pichi Premani"	Jeet Gannguli	Chandrabose	Sreerama Chandra Mynampati
2015	Size Zero	"Innava Innava"	M. M. Keeravani		Madumita, Ramya
2016	M.S. Dhoni: The Untold Story	"Ninnevarika Premistharu"	Amaal Mallik	Chaitanya Prasad	
2019	Amavasya	"Guppedantha Gunde Lona"	Sanjeev–Darshan		Jubin Nautiyal
2019	Amavasya	"Naa Madhi Oh Mata"	Sanjeev–Darshan		Shriram Iyer

=== Kannada songs ===
Year	Film	Song	Composer(s)	Writer(s)	Co-singer(s)
2014	Love Is Poison	"Dyaniyaagiruve"	Sai Kiran	Panakanahalli Prasanna	
2014	Love Is Poison	"Yaako Kaane Dina"	Sai Kiran	Panakanahalli Prasanna	Loveguru Rajesh
2014	Paru Wife of Devadas	"Kannalle Neenu"	Arjun Janya	Jayanth Kaikini	Sonu Nigam
2014	Adyaksha	"Sum Sumne"	Arjun Janya	K. Kalyan	
2015	Muddu Manase	"Aago Heego"	Vineeth Raj Menon	A. P. Arjun	
2015	Rana Vikrama	"Neene Neene"	V. Harikrishna		Puneeth Rajkumar
2015	Sharp Shooter	"Yelle Hodaru"	M. S. Shiva Santosh	Ghouse Peer	Sonu Nigam
2015	DK	"Besari Marada"	Arjun Janya	Sudarshan	Shankar Mahadevan
2015	Luv U Alia	Haradide Manasu"	Jassie Gift	Kaviraj	
2016	Mukunda Murari	Gopala Baa"	Arjun Janya	V. Nagendra Prasad	Vijay Prakash, Chintan Vikas
2016	Simpallag Innondh Love Story	"Thusu Preethiya"	Bharath B. J.		Sonu Nigam
2017	Endendu Hesaridali	"Prema Peeditha"	Surendranath BR		Armaan Malik
2017	First Love	"Kaaneyaagi Hode Naanu"	V. Sridhar		
2018	Ayogya	"Yenammi Yenammi"	Arjun Janya		Vijay Prakash
2018	Anukta	"Thalupisadhe Ulidhiruva"	Nobil Paul		Ashwin Sharma
2018	Prema Baraha	"Prema Baraha"	Jassie Gift		Armaan Malik
2019	99	"Nee Gnyapaka"	Arjun Janya		Sonu Nigam
2019	Bhanu Weds Bhoomi	"Jeeva Jaari"	AM Neel		
2021	Yellow Board	"Preethiye"	Advik		Sonu Nigam
2021	Yellow Board	"Preethiye"(Pathos)	Advik		Sonu Nigam
2022	Parambha	"Onde Ondu Saari Ninna"	Prajwal Pai		
2023	Melody Drama	"Yaaru Bareyada"	Kiran Ravindranath		
2023	Melody Drama	"Chadurida Baligondu"	Kiran Ravindranath		

=== Tamil songs ===
Year	Film	Song	Composer(s)	Writer(s)	Co-singer(s)
2015	Inji Iduppazhagi	Kannaalam	M. M. Keeravani		Damini, Mohana Bhogaraju
2016	M.S. Dhoni: The Untold Story (D)	"Unnaal unnaal un ninaival"	Amaal Mallik	P. Vijay	

=== Marathi songs ===
Year	Film	Song	Composer(s)	Writer(s)	Co-singer(s)
2016	M.S. Dhoni: The Untold Story (D)	Shravasatun Tu Darvalta	Amaal Mallik	Guru Thakur	

=== Gujarati songs ===
Year	Film	Song	Composer(s)	Writer(s)	Co-singer(s)
2016	Polam Pol	"Sapnaao Sacha Thashe Sapnaao Sacha Thashe"	Paresh-Bhavesh		Farhad Bhiwandiwala
2019	Hungama House	Mithi Mithi Vaato"	Paresh Bhavesh	Iqbal Qureshi	Favad Bhivadivala

=== Punjabi songs ===
Year	Film	Song	Composer(s)	Writer(s)	Co-singer(s)
2013	Love Yoou Soniye	Labda Phira"			Shree D, Swaroop Khan
2013	Love Yoou Soniye	"Love Karley"			ShreeD

=== Bhojpuri songs ===
Year	Film	Song	Composer(s)	Writer(s)	Co-singer(s)
2011	Truck Driver	Lagal Ba Tohara Se Lagan Hamara Dil Ke			Pawan Singh
2012	Chhath Song	"Jode Jode Phalwa"		Vinay Bihari	Pawan Singh, Palak Muchhal
2012	Chhath Song	"Chhath song(lali suruj dev ke rathwa pe sawar)"			
2012		Kaanch Hi Baans Ke Bahangiya			
2013	Dulhe Raja	Nehiya Ke Phulwa		Pyarelal Yadav	Pawan Singh, Palak Muchhal

=== Urdu songs ===
Year	Film	Song	Composer(s)	Writer(s)	Co-singer(s)
2014	The System	Sayyon Re	Shailesh Suvarna	Mohit Pathak	
2018	Zeher-e-Ishq				

== Honours and awards ==
- Silver Medal for the year 2000 by Vice President of India Krishan Kant as National Child Award For Exceptional Achievement (Rashtriya Bal Puraskar).
- Winner of Sony Entertainment Television (India) TV show Cadbury Bournvita Confidence Champions (2006)
- Muchhal has made her entry in Limca Book of World Records for great achievements in social work.
- CBSE and Maharashtra board has included Palak's achievement in the textbook of seventh standard moral science.
- Zee Cine Awards 2014 Sa Re Ga Ma Pa Fresh Singing Talent for "Meri Aashiqui" song of Aashiqui 2 and also a nomination in Best Female Playback Singer category for the same song.
- Stardust Award for Best Female Playback Singer for the title track of Prem Ratan Dhan Payo in 2015.
- Got her first-ever nomination in the Filmfare Awards through 61st Filmfare Awards in 2016 as a playback singer for the same song and category.
- BIG Star Entertainment Awards for BIG Star Most Entertaining Singer (Female) for the same.
- Her contribution resulted in winning Best Track of the Year Award 2015 for "Prem Ratan Dhan Payo" song in Zee Cine Awards.
- Received her first ever Screen Award for "Kaun Tujhe Yun Pyaar Karega" _ M.S. Dhoni: The Untold Story in December 2016.
- Second nomination in Filmfares through 62nd Filmfare Awards 2017 for "Kaun Tujhe" once again.
- Became a judge in The Voice India Kids 2017 _ &TV with Himesh Reshammiya, Shaan (singer) and Papon, and ultimately a contestant (from "Palak's Team") won the title even after facing a critical stage of her life as a minor girl 'about her modesty issues'.
- Received the Honorary Doctorate by the American University, United States for Global Peace (2021)
