= Hitler Didi =

Indian soap opera

- Genre: Soap opera
- Written by: Sanjay Kumar; Ila Bedi Datta; Malavika Asthana; Satyam K. Tripathi
- Directed by: Mohit Jha and Vikram Ghai
- Starring: Rati Pandey; Sumit Vats
- Theme music composer: Dony Hazarika
- Opening theme: Sunidhi Chauhan
- Country of origin: India
- Original language: Hindi
- No. of seasons: 1
- No. of episodes: 448

Production
- Executive producers: Rajat Bedi; Manek Bedi
- Producers: Rohit Vaid; Ila Bedi Dutta
- Cinematography: Hanif Sheikh
- Editor: Manish Mistry
- Camera setup: Multi-camera
- Running time: 21 minutes
- Production company: Trilogy krikos

Original release
- Network: Zee TV
- Release: 7 November 2011 – 2 August 2013

Hitler Didi (transl. Hitler Sister but figuratively Auntie Hitler) is an Indian soap opera that aired on Zee TV. It premiered on 7 November 2011. The story is set in Delhi.

== Plot ==
Indira Sharma, who is the sole breadwinner in her family, falls in love with Rishi Kumar. They both marry after facing a lot of obstacles. Indira was diagnosed with brain tumor and has 30 days to live. So she tried her best to make her family members settle without her help in the less span of time. She also fulfilled her remaining wishes within those days. She forces Rishi to marry Shweta and while their marriage her tumor bursts. It was revealed that Indira was pregnant and Shweta hid Indira's pregnancy from everyone under the scolding of Rishi's mother. To repent her mistake, Shweta becomes a surrogate mother of Indira's child. She gives birth to Indira and Rishi's daughter, Indu.

=== 8 years later ===
Indira is shown to have died. Rishi takes care of Indu as a single father, living in Indira's house. Indu is just like Indira. Zara Khan, Indira's look-alike police officer enters. Indira's family forces Rishi to marry Zara. However, Indira is shown to be alive in mental asylum losing her mind as well as memory. Indu meets Indira and brings her back with Rishi's help. Zara kidnaps Indira. Rishi saves her and sends Zara to a mental asylum. After that a new character Kabir enters and it turns out he has a connection with Indira in some way. Indira constantly calls out to someone named Saheb it turns out Saheb is Kabir who has a connection with Indira from Pakistan in the past. But After some twists, Indira regains her memory and reunites with Rishi, Indu, and Her family. Zara returns and tries to create problems, but in vain. Finally, Indira gives birth to a son and Indu settles every Sharma men in their professions.

== Cast ==
=== Main ===
- Rati Pandey as
  - Indira Sharma Diwan Chandela – Inder and Kutumb's elder daughter; Munna, Vidhit, and Mandira's sister; Rishi's wife; Indu and Chiku's mother
  - Zaara Khan – Indira's lookalike; Ex-police officer; Malik's ex-wife
- Sumit Vats as Rishikeshwar "Rishi" Diwan Chandela – Simi's younger son; Sameer's brother; Kulbhushan's cousin; Indira's husband; Indu and Chiku's father

=== Recurring ===
- Shruti Bisht as Indu Diwan Chandela – Indira and Rishi's daughter; Shweta's surrogate daughter; Chiku's sister; Ishaan and Seher's cousin
- Rituraj Singh as
  - Inder Sharma – Dulari's brother; Kutumb's husband; Jhumpa's ex-husband; Munna, Vidhit, Indira and Mandira's father; Ishaan, Seher, Indu and Chiku's grandfather
  - Kala Diwan Chandela – Inder's lookalike; Jwaladevi's elder son; Kulbhushan's father
- Sejal Shah as Kutumbh Sharma – Inder's wife; Munna, Vidhit, Indira, and Mandira's mother; Ishaan, Seher, Indu, and Chiku's grandmother
- Aakash Pandey as Radhe – Neighbour at Chandni Chowk; Estate agent
- Sandeep Baswana as Munna Sharma – Inder and Kutumb's elder son; Vidhit, Indira and Mandira's brother; Sunaina's husband; Savita's widower; Ishaan and Seher's father
- Smita Singh as Sunaina Sharma – Munna's wife; Ishaan and Seher's mother
- Gargi Sharma as Mandira Sharma Chaddha – Inder and Kutumb's younger daughter; Munna, Vidhit, and Indira's sister; Pappu's wife
- Deepesh Bhan as Pappu Chaddha – Mandira's husband
- Kapil Soni as Vidhit Sharma – Inder and Kutumb's younger son; Munna, Indira and Mandira's brother
- Harsh Rajput as Ishaan Sharma – Munna and Sunaina's son; Seher's brother; Indu and Chiku's cousin
  - Rahul Pendkalkar as Child Ishaan Sharma
- Divya Naaz as Seher Sharma – Munna and Sunaina's daughter; Ishaan's sister; Indu and Chiku's cousin
- Aasiya Kazi as Dr. Shweta Kapoor – Indu's surrogate mother
- Girish Jain as Dr. Jaswant Rai Singhania – Abha's husband; Sahil's father
- Silky Khanna as Abha Singhania – Jaswant's wife; Sahil's mother
- Hardik Somnathwala as Sahil "Bheem" Singhania – Jaswant and Abha's son
- Rahil Azam as Malik Khan – A terrorist; Meher's brother; Zaara's ex-husband
- Preeya Subba as Meher Khan – Malik's sister; Inder's ex-lover
- Rohit Roy as Major Kabir Chaudhary / Saheb – Army officer; Noor's husband; Trisha's father
- Dolly Sohi as Noor Khan Chaudhary – Khan's daughter; Kabir's wife; Trisha's mother
- Unknown as Trisha "Babli" Chaudhary – Kabir and Noor's daughter
- Vikram Sahu as Major Khan – ISI Chief; Noor's father
- Abhinav Shukla as Inspector Sumer Singh Chaudhary – Indira's helper
- Jasveer Kaur as Savita Sharma – Munna's second wife
- Sheeba Chaddha as Dulari Sharma – Inder's sister
- Shabnam Sayed as Jhumpa Lahiri Sharma – Inder's ex-wife
- Navneet Nishan as Simi Diwan Chandela – Sameer and Rishi's mother; Indu and Chiku's grandmother
- Mrunal Jain as Sameer Diwan Chandela – Simi's elder son; Rishi's brother; Kulbhushan's cousin
- Jaanvi Sangwan as Jwaladevi Diwan Chandela – Kala's mother; Kulbhushan, Sameer, and Rishi's grandmother; Indu and Chiku's great-grandmother
- Pankaj Vishnu as Kulbhushan Diwan Chandela – Kala's son; Sameer and Rishi's cousin; Nanda's husband
- Garima Bhardwaj as Nanda Diwan Chandela – Kulbhushan's wife
- Neha Talwar as Sajni – A bar dancer
- Ravi Jhankal as RajRani – Owner of brothel
- Moorti Persaud as Jaya
- Ashwini Kalsekar as Advocate Rani Bhatija
- Vikas Anand as Judge during Mandira Sharma Rape case
- Sunita Rajwar as Jamuna Dhai
- Saurabh Yadav as Saurabh Sumer
- Nittin Sharma as Inspector Rudra "Vanraj" Pratap Singh

=== Guest ===
- Asha Negi as Purvi Deshmukh Kirloskar from Pavitra Rishta
- Ranjeet as Ranjeet Kukreja, Owner Kukreja Properties
- Sonu Sood as Inspector Pratap Pandit

== Production ==
Portions of the show were shot in Chandni Chowk area of Delhi.

== Reception ==
Kshama Rao of The Indian Express gave the show two out of five, writing, "While it's nice to see a primetime heroine crack the whip, the joy is short-lived as a large part of the show is unappealing. It looks half-baked in places — for instance, there was a scene between Rishi and an old woman who he sees on the neighbouring barsaati which we still haven't figured out!"

In the United States, the Anti-Defamation League, a civil rights group, asked Zee TV's executives to remove "Hitler" from the show's title and to rename it with something "less offensive." A Zee TV spokesperson confirmed that the channel received the letter from the group but has yet to respond. She stated that the show's title has nothing to do with Hitler himself, but is intended to portray the girl's temperament. The spokeswoman claimed the show has not received any complaints from India over its name and declined to comment on whether they are considering changing it. It was later renamed as General Didi in North America and Europe. When the series started airing in the Arab world in 2014, the Anti-Defamation League again voiced their disappointment in a press release on the reemergence of Hitler's name in the series title.
