= List of Hindi films of 1974 =

A list of films produced by the Bollywood film industry based in Mumbai in 1974:

== Highest-grossing films ==
These are the highest-grossing Hindi films of 1974. Gross collection figures are worldwide, unless otherwise noted.

Rank	Title	Gross collection	Notes
1	Roti Kapda Aur Makaan	₹16.11 crore	
2	Dost	₹7.29 crore	
3	Bidaai	₹6.72 crore	
4	Amir Garib	₹6.44 crore	
5	Chor Machaye Shor	₹6 crore	Domestic gross
6	Aap Ki Kasam	₹5.87 crore	
7	Prem Nagar	₹4.50 crore	Domestic gross
8	Majboor	₹4.49 crore	
9	Roti	₹4 crore	Domestic gross
10	Kunwara Baap	₹3.54 crore	

== A-Z ==
Title	Director	Cast	Genre	Sources / notes
27 Down	Awtar Krishna Kaul	Raakhee Gulzar, Sudhir Dalvi	Drama	
36 Ghante	Raj Tilak	Raaj Kumar, Sunil Dutt, Vijay Arora, Parveen Babi	Thriller	
5 Rifles	I. S. Johar	Rakesh Khanna, Shahi Kapoor	Action	
Aap Ki Kasam	J. Om Prakash	Rajesh Khanna, Mumtaz, Sanjeev Kumar	Romance	
Aashiana	Syed Hussain	Neetu Singh	Drama	
Aarop	Atma Ram	Saira Banu, Vinod Khanna, Vinod Mehra	Romance	
Ajanabee	Shakti Samanta	Rajesh Khanna, Zeenat Aman	Romance	
Albeli	Karunesh Thakur	Vinod Mehra, Rehana Sultan	Romance	
Amar Saheed Bhagat Singh	Omi Bedi	Dara Singh, Som Dutt, Achala Sachdev, Kharati, Kamal Kapoor, Rajan Haksar, Azaad Irani, Dav Kumar, Rajan kapoor	Historical Biographical	
Amir Garib	Mohan Kumar	Dev Anand, Hema Malini, Tanuja	Action	
Anjaan Raahen	Mohan Kumar	Feroz Khan, Asha Parekh	Comedy	
Ankur	Shyam Benegal	Shabana Azmi, Ananth Nag	Drama	
Apradhi	Jugal Kishore	Yogeeta Bali	Drama	
Archana	Satpal	Sanjeev Kumar	Drama	
Avishkaar	Basu Bhattacharya	Rajesh Khanna, Sharmila Tagore, Dina Pathak	Romance	
Azad Mohabbat	Batra Kaushalraj	Yogeeta Bali	Drama	
Badhti Ka Naam Dadhi	Kishore Kumar	Kishore Kumar, Ashok Kumar	Drama	
Badi Maa	Ram Narayan Gabale	Noor Jehan, Ishwarlal, Yakub		
Badla	Vijay	Moushumi Chatterjee, Mehmood	Drama	
Balak Dhruv	Himmat Dave	Abhi Bhattacharya	Drama	
Bazaar Band Karo	B. R. Ishara	Asha Chandra, Manher Desai		
Benaam	Narendra Bedi	Amitabh Bachchan, Moushumi Chatterjee	Suspense	
Bidaai	L. V. Prasad	Jeetendra, Leena Chandavarkar	Drama	
Call Girl	Vijay Kapoor	Vikram	Drama	
Charitraheen	Shakti Samanta	Sanjeev Kumar, Sharmila Tagore, Yogeeta Bali	Drama	
Chattan Singh	Kedar Kapoor	Roopesh Kumar, Vinod Mehra	Drama	
Chhote Sarkar	K. Shankar	Shammi Kapoor, Sadhana, Shashikala, Helen	Drama	
Chor Chor	Prem Prakash	Vijay Anand, Leena Chandavarkar	Drama	
Chor Machaye Shor	Ashok Roy	Shashi Kapoor, Mumtaz	Drama	
Chowkidar	Shyam Ralhan	Yogeeta Bali, Vinod Khanna	Drama	
Dawat	B. R. Ishara	Dilip Dutt	Drama	
Dhuen Ki Lakeer	Kishore Sahu	Ramesh Arora, Parveen Babi	Drama	
Dil Diwana	Narendra Bedi	Randhir Kapoor, Jaya Bachchan, Aruna Irani	Drama	
Do Aankhen	Ajoy Biswas	Biswajeet, Rekha	Drama	
Do Chattane	G. H. Sarin	Aruna Irani	Drama	
Do Nambar Ke Amir	P. D. Shenoy	Asha Sachdev	Drama	
Do Phool	S. Ramanathan	Vinod Mehra, Aruna Irani, Mehmood	Comedy	
Do Sher		Dharmendra		
Doosri Sita	Gogi Anand	Jaya Bachchan, Lalita Pawar	Drama	
Dost	Dulal Guha	Dharmendra, Hema Malini, Shatrugan Sinha	Drama	
Duniya Ka Mela	Kundan Kumar	Rekha, Sanjay Khan	Drama	
Ek Anek Aur Ekta	Bhimsian		Animation	
Farebi	Suresh Issar	Vinod Khanna, Bindu	Drama	
Faslah	Khwaja Ahmad Abbas	Shabana Azmi, Vinod Mehra	Drama	
Geetaa Mera Naam	Sadhana Shivdasani	Sunil Dutt, Feroz Khan, Sadhana Shivdasani	Drama	
Goonj	S. U. Syed	Rakesh Roshan, Reena Roy, Mahendra Sandhu	Horror, Thriller	
Haath Ki Safai	Prakash Mehra	Vinod Khanna, Randhir Kapoor, Hema Malini, Simi	Drama	
Hamrahi	Anand Sagar	Tanuja, Randhir Kapoor	Drama	
Hanuman Vijay	Babubhai Mistri	Raaj Kumar	Mythology	
Har Har Mahadev	Chandrakant	Aruna Irani, Dara Singh	Mythology	
Hawas	Saawan Kumar Tak	Rekha, Neetu Singh, Anil Dhawan	Drama	
Humshakal	Jambulingam	Rajesh Khanna, Tanuja, Maushumi Chatterji	Thriller	
Imaan	Padmanabh	Sanjeev Kumar, Leena Chandavarkar	Romance	
Imtihan	Madan Sinha	Vinod Khanna, Tanuja	Drama	
Insaaniyat	Prayag Raj	Shashi Kapoor, Sujit Kumar	Drama	
International Crook	Pachhi	Dharmendra, Saira Banu, Feroz Khan	Crime	
Ishk Ishk Ishk	Dev Anand	Dev Anand, Shabana Azmi, Zeenat Aman	Romance	
Jab Andhera Hota Hai	Deepak Bahry	Madan Puri, Prem Chopra	Thriller	
Jadu Ka Shankh	Sai Paranjpye	Kulbhushan Kharbanda	Drama	
Jai Radhe Krishna	Yeshwant Pethkar	Moha Choti	Devotional	
Jeevan Rekha	Nanubhai Bhatt	Tabrez, Farida Jalal, Pran, K. N. Singh, Ajit Khan, Jalal Aga, Keshto Mukherjee, Chandrashekhar, Asit Sen		
Jeevan Sangram	Rajbans Khanna	Shashi Kapoor, Iftekhar	Historical Drama	
Jurm Aur Sazaa	Nisar Ahmad Ansari	Vinod Mehra, Nisar Ahmad Ansari	Drama	
Kasauti	Aravind Sen	Amitabh Bachchan, Hema Malini, Pran	Drama	
Khote Sikkay	Narendra Bedi	Danny Denzongpa, Feroz Khan	Action	
Khoon Ki Keemat	Shibu Mitrav	Ashok Kumar	Drama	
Kisan Aur Bhagwan	Chandrakant	Dara Singh, Feroz Khan	Action, Comedy	
Kora Badan	B. S. Ghad	Sunil Dutt, Mala Sinha	Drama	
Kora Kagaz	Anil Ganguly	Vijay Anand, Jaya Bachchan	Romance	
Kunwara Baap	Mehmood	Mehmood, Vinod Mehra, Bharathi Vishnuvardhan, Lalita Pawar, Sanjeev Kumar	Comedy	
Maa Bahen Aur Biwi	Harbans Kumar	Kabir Bedi, Raj Kishore	Drama	
Madhosh	Desh Gautam	Rakesh Roshan, Reena Roy	Drama	
Majboor	Ravi Tandon	Amitabh Bachchan, Parveen Babi, Farida Jalal, Pran	Drama	
Manoranjan	Shammi Kapoor	Shammi Kapoor, Sanjeev Kumar, Zeenat Aman	Romance	
Manzilein Aur Bhi Hain	Mahesh Bhatt	Kabir Bedi, Mukesh Bhatt	Drama	
Mr. Romeo	Subhash Mukherjee	Shashi Kapoor, Rinku Jaiswal	Drama	
Naya Din Nai Raat	A. Bhimsingh	Sanjeev Kumar, Jaya Bachchan	Drama	
Nirmaan	Ravi Tandon	Anoop Kumar	Drama	
Paap Aur Punya	Prayag Raj	Shashi Kapoor, Sharmila Tagore	Drama	
Parinay	Kantilal Rathod	Romesh Sharma, Shabana Azmi, Asha Sachdev	Social	Awarded Best Feature Film on National Integration
Patthar Aur Payal	Harmesh Malhotra	Dharmendra, Vinod Khanna, Hema Malini	Drama	
Phir Kab Milogi	Hrishikesh Mukherjee	Mala Sinha	Romance	
Pocket Maar	Ramesh Lakhanpal	Dharmendra, Saira Banu	Drama	
Pran Jaye Par Vachan Na Jaye	S. Ali Raza	Sunil Dutt, Rekha, Iftekhar	Drama	
Prem Nagar	K. S. Prakash Rao	Rajesh Khanna, Hema Malini, Ashok Kumar	Drama	
Prem Shastra	B. R. Ishara	Dev Anand, Zeenat Aman	Drama	
Rajnigandha	Basu Chatterjee	Amol Palekar, Vidya Sinha	Romance	
Resham Ki Dori	Atma Ram	Dharmendra, Saira Banu	Drama	
Roti	Manmohan Desai	Rajesh Khanna, Mumtaz, Vijay Arora	Romance	
Roti Kapda Aur Makaan	Manoj Kumar	Manoj Kumar, Shashi Kapoor, Amitabh Bachchan, Zeenat Aman, Maushumi Chatterji	Drama	
Sagina	Tapan Sinha	Dilip Kumar, Saira Banu	Drama	
Shaitaan	Firoze Chinoy	Shatrughan Sinha, Sharmila Tagore	Thriller	
Trimurti	Rajendra Bhatia	Parveen Babi, Sanjay Khan, Rakesh Roshan	Drama	
Us Paar	Basu Chatterjee	Vinod Mehra, Moushumi Chatterjee		
Vachan	Suraj Prakash	Shashi Kapoor, Vimi		
Woh Main Nahin	Mohan Segal	Navin Nischol, Rekha	Drama	
Zehreela Insaan	S. R. Puttana Kanagal	Rishi Kapoor, Moushumi Chatterjee, Neetu Singh, Pran, Nirupa Roy, Dara Singh, Iftekhar, Madan Puri, Paintal	Romance	

== See also ==
- List of Hindi films of 1973
- List of Hindi films of 1975
