= Filmfare Award for Best Music Director =

Award in India

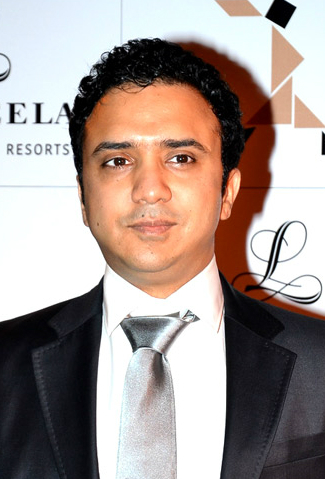
- 2025 recipient Ram Sampath
- Awarded for: Best Performance by a Music Director
- Country: India
- Presented by: Filmfare
- First award: Naushad Ali, Baiju Bawra "Tu Ganga Ki Mauj" (1954)
- Currently held by: Ram Sampath; Laapataa Ladies (2025)
- Website: Filmfare Awards

The Filmfare Award for Best Music Director is given by the Filmfare magazine as part of its annual Filmfare Awards for Hindi films, to the best composer/arranger of a soundtrack. Filmfare award is the most prestigious award in India for Music Directors apart from the National Award. This category was first presented in 1954. Naushad Ali was the first recipient of this award for his song "Tu Ganga Ki Mauj" from the film Baiju Bawra. For the first two years, it was awarded to the composer for a particular song and not the entire album. From 1956 onwards, awards in this category have been given for the entire soundtrack. From 2017, the name of this was category changed from best music direction to music album.

== Superlatives ==
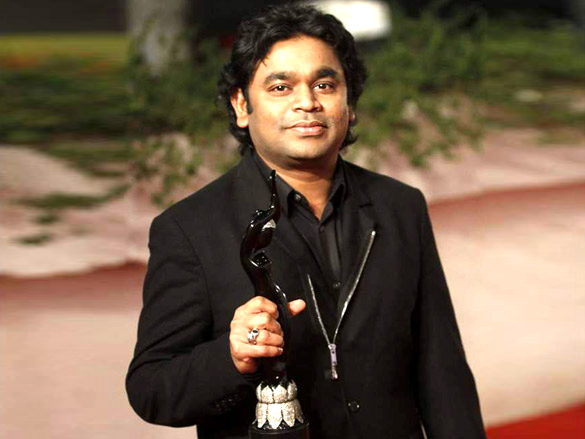
A. R. Rahman with his award of 2012 for the film Rockstar. He holds the record of maximum wins in this category.

Category	Name	Superlative	Notes
Most Awards	A. R. Rahman	10 awards	Awards resulted from 19 nominations
Most Nominations	Pritam	26 nominations	Nominations resulted in 6 awards
Most Nominations in a single year	Pritam	4 nominations	Nominations resulted in 1 award
Most Nominations In 10 Years (2008–2018)	Pritam	14 nominations	Nominations resulted in 5 awards
Most Nominations without a Win	Jatin–Lalit; Vishal-Shekhar	12 nominations 11 Nominations	0 Wins

- The top five Filmfare Award for Best Music Director winner's have a total of 36 awards. A. R. Rahman leads the winners with 10 filmfare awards, followed by the music director duo of Shankar–Jaikishan, who have 9, then Laxmikant–Pyarelal with 7 awards, Pritam with 6 and Nadeem–Shravan with 4.
- Pritam has the most nominations with 26, followed by Laxmikant-Pyarelal with 25, Shankar–Jaikishan with 20, A. R. Rahman with 19, and R. D. Burman with 17.
- Pritam has the most nominations in a 10-year span with 14 nominations, winning in 5 among these 14.
- Pritam received 6 consecutive nominations between 2013 and 2018, and won in 2013, 2017 and 2018.
- Pritam has the highest number of nominations in a single year, with 4 nominations in 2024, winning the award for Animal (2023), while also being nominated solely for Dunki, Rocky Aur Rani Kii Prem Kahaani, and Tu Jhoothi Main Makkar. There have been three instances when a music director (or duo) were nominated thrice in the same year – Bappi Lahiri in 1985, Laxmikant Pyarelal in 1986 and A. R. Rahman in 2009.
- Shankar–Jaikishan holds the record for the highest number of consecutive-year nominations (9), having been nominated for the award every year from 1959 till 1967, winning the award four times from ten total nominations.
- Laxmikant-Pyarelal and A. R. Rahman have the distinction of winning the award four times in a row between 1978 and 1981 and between 2007 and 2010, respectively. Those who have won the award thrice in a row are Shankar–Jaikishan (1971–1973) and Nadeem Shravan (1991–1993).
- Usha Khanna, Sneha Khanwalkar, Parampara Thakur and Jasleen Royal are the only four women to have ever been nominated for this award. They were nominated for their work in the Souten (1983), Gangs of Wasseypur (2012), Kabir Singh (2020) and Shershaah (2022) respectively. Parampara Thakur won the award, becoming the first woman to do so. In 2022, Jasleen Royal became the second woman to win this.
- Jatin–Lalit has never won this award after receiving 12 nominations from (1992–2006), but after the separation of Jatin Pandit and Lalit Pandit, Lalit Pandit won the Filmfare Best music Director Awards for Dabangg in 2010.
- Anu Malik won a Special Award in 2001 for the film Refugee.
- Vishal-Shekhar is the duo who have never won an award after receiving 11 nominations from (2005–2024).

=== Most wins ===
Winner	Number of Wins	Number of Nominations	Years
A. R. Rahman	10	19	1996, 1999, 2000, 2002, 2003, 2007, 2008, 2009, 2010, 2012
Shankar–Jaikishan	9	20	1957, 1960, 1961, 1963, 1967, 1969, 1971, 1972, 1973
Laxmikant–Pyarelal	7	25	1965, 1968, 1970, 1978, 1979, 1980, 1981
Pritam	6	26	2013, 2017, 2018, 2021, 2023, 2024
Nadeem–Shravan	4	10	1991, 1992, 1993, 1997
R. D. Burman	3	17	1983, 1984, 1995
Shankar–Ehsaan–Loy	3	14	2004, 2006, 2015
S. D. Burman	2	8	1955, 1974
Amaal Malik	2	9	2016, 2020
Khayyam	2	6	1977, 1982
Mithoon	2	6	2014, 2020
Ravi	2	6	1961, 1966
Ankit Tiwari	2	5	2014, 2016
Anu Malik	2	2	1994, 2005
Vishal Mishra	2	3	2020, 2024
Jaani	2	2	2022, 2024

=== Multiple nominees ===
Multiple music directors (or duo/trio) have received multiple Best Music Director nominations.

Artist	Number of Nominations	Wins
Pritam	26	6
Laxmikant–Pyarelal	25	7
Shankar–Jaikishan	20	9
A. R. Rahman	19	10
R. D. Burman	17	3
Anu Malik	14	2
Shankar–Ehsaan–Loy	13	3
Jatin–Lalit	12	0
Vishal-Shekhar	11	0
Nadeem–Shravan	10	4
Rajesh Roshan	10	2

== Winners and nominees ==
In the list below, the winner of the award for each year is shown first, followed by the other nominees. The films are listed by the years when the award was presented. The announcing of nominations became regular after 1956.

Table key
‡	Indicates the winner

=== 1950s ===
Year	Photos of winners	Music Director	Film
1954 (1st)		Naushad Ali ‡	Baiju Bawra (for the song "Tu Ganga Ki Mauj")
1955 (2nd)		S. D. Burman ‡	Taxi Driver (for the song "Jaaye To Jaaye Kahan")
1956 (3rd)		Hemant Kumar ‡	Nagin
1956 (3rd)		C. Ramchandra	Azaad
1956 (3rd)		Naushad Ali	Uran Khatola
1957 (4th)		Shankar–Jaikishan ‡	Chori Chori
1957 (4th)		O. P. Nayyar	C.I.D.
1958 (5th)		O. P. Nayyar ‡	Naya Daur
1958 (5th)		C. Ramchandra	Asha
1959 (6th)		Salil Chowdhury ‡	Madhumati
1959 (6th)		O. P. Nayyar	Phagun
1959 (6th)		Shankar–Jaikishan	Yahudi

=== 1960s ===
Year	Photos of winners	Music Director	Film
1960 (7th)		Shankar–Jaikishan ‡	Anari
1960 (7th)		S. D. Burman	Sujata
1960 (7th)		Shankar–Jaikishan	Chhoti Bahen
1961 (8th)		Shankar–Jaikishan ‡	Dil Apna Aur Preet Parai
1961 (8th)		Naushad Ali	Mughal–e–Azam
1961 (8th)		Ravi	Chaudhvin Ka Chand
1962 (9th)	–	Ravi ‡	Gharana
1962 (9th)	–	Naushad Ali	Gunga Jumna
1962 (9th)	–	Shankar–Jaikishan	Jis Desh Men Ganga Behti Hai
1963 (10th)		Shankar–Jaikishan ‡	Professor
1963 (10th)		Hemant Kumar	Bees Saal Baad
1963 (10th)		Madan Mohan	Anpadh
1964 (11th)	–	Roshan ‡	Taj Mahal
1964 (11th)	–	Naushad Ali	Mere Mehboob
1964 (11th)	–	Shankar–Jaikishan	Dil Ek Mandir
1965 (12th)		Laxmikant–Pyarelal ‡	Dosti
1965 (12th)		Madan Mohan	Woh Kaun Thi?
1965 (12th)		Shankar–Jaikishan	Sangam
1966 (13th)	–	Ravi ‡	Khandan
1966 (13th)	–	Kalyanji–Anandji	Himalaya Ki God Mein
1966 (13th)	–	Shankar–Jaikishan	Arzoo
1967 (14th)		Shankar–Jaikishan ‡	Suraj
1967 (14th)		Ravi	Do Badan
1967 (14th)		S. D. Burman	Guide
1968 (15th)		Laxmikant–Pyarelal ‡	Milan
1968 (15th)		Kalyanji–Anandji	Upkar
1968 (15th)		Ravi	Hamraaz
1969 (16th)		Shankar–Jaikishan ‡	Brahmachari
1969 (16th)		Ravi	Ankhen
1969 (16th)		Shankar–Jaikishan	Diwana

=== 1970s ===
Year	Photos of winners	Music Director	Film
1970 (17th)		Laxmikant–Pyarelal ‡	Jeene Ki Raah
1970 (17th)		S. D. Burman	Aradhana
1970 (17th)		Shankar–Jaikishan	Chanda Aur Bijli
1971 (18th)		Shankar–Jaikishan ‡	Pehchaan
1971 (18th)		Laxmikant–Pyarelal	Do Raaste
1971 (18th)		S. D. Burman	Talaash
1972 (19th)		Shankar–Jaikishan ‡	Mera Naam Joker
1972 (19th)		R. D. Burman	Caravan
1972 (19th)		Shankar–Jaikishan	Andaz
1973 (20th)		Shankar–Jaikishan ‡	Be–Imaan
1973 (20th)		Ghulam Mohammed	Pakeezah
1973 (20th)		Laxmikant–Pyarelal	Shor
1973 (20th)		R. D. Burman	Amar Prem
1974 (21st)		S. D. Burman ‡	Abhimaan
1974 (21st)		Kalyanji–Anandji	Zanjeer
1974 (21st)		Laxmikant–Pyarelal	Bobby
1974 (21st)		Laxmikant–Pyarelal	Daag
1974 (21st)		R. D. Burman	Yaadon Ki Baaraat
1975 (22nd)	–	Kalyanji–Anandji ‡	Kora Kagaz
1975 (22nd)	–	Laxmikant–Pyarelal	Roti Kapda Aur Makaan
1975 (22nd)	–	R. D. Burman	Aap Ki Kasam
1975 (22nd)	–	S. D. Burman	Prem Nagar
1975 (22nd)	–	Shankar–Jaikishan	Resham Ki Dori
1976 (23rd)		Rajesh Roshan ‡	Julie
1976 (23rd)		Laxmikant–Pyarelal	Dulhan
1976 (23rd)		R. D. Burman	Khel Khel Mein
1976 (23rd)		R. D. Burman	Sholay
1976 (23rd)		Shankar–Jaikishan	Sanyasi
1977 (24th)		Khayyam ‡	Kabhi Kabhie
1977 (24th)		Kalyanji–Anandji	Bairaag
1977 (24th)		Madan Mohan	Mausam
1977 (24th)		R. D. Burman	Mehbooba
1977 (24th)		Ravindra Jain	Chitchor
1978 (25th)		Laxmikant–Pyarelal ‡	Amar Akbar Anthony
1978 (25th)		Jaidev	Alaap
1978 (25th)		R. D. Burman	Hum Kisise Kum Naheen
1978 (25th)		R. D. Burman	Kinara
1978 (25th)		Rajesh Roshan	Swami
1979 (26th)		Laxmikant–Pyarelal ‡	Satyam Shivam Sundaram
1979 (26th)		Kalyanji–Anandji	Don
1979 (26th)		R. D. Burman	Shalimar
1979 (26th)		Rajesh Roshan	Des Pardes
1979 (26th)		Ravindra Jain	Ankhiyon Ke Jharokhon Se

=== 1980s ===
Year	Photos of winners	Music Director	Film
1980 (27th)		Laxmikant–Pyarelal ‡	Sargam
1980 (27th)		Khayyam	Noorie
1980 (27th)		Laxmikant–Pyarelal	Jaani Dushman
1980 (27th)		Rajesh Roshan	Kaala Patthar
1980 (27th)		Rajesh Roshan	Mr. Natwarlal
1981 (28th)		Laxmikant–Pyarelal ‡	Karz
1981 (28th)		Kalyanji–Anandji	Qurbani
1981 (28th)		Khayyam	Thodisi Bewafaii
1981 (28th)		Laxmikant–Pyarelal	Aasha
1981 (28th)		R. D. Burman	Shaan
1982 (29th)		Khayyam ‡	Umrao Jaan
1982 (29th)		Bappi Lahiri	Armaan
1982 (29th)		Laxmikant–Pyarelal	Ek Duuje Ke Liye
1982 (29th)		R. D. Burman	Love Story
1982 (29th)		Shiv–Hari	Silsila
1983 (30th)		R. D. Burman ‡	Sanam Teri Kasam
1983 (30th)		Bappi Lahiri	Namak Halaal
1983 (30th)		Khayyam	Bazaar
1983 (30th)		Laxmikant–Pyarelal	Prem Rog
1983 (30th)		Ravi	Nikaah
1984 (31st)		R. D. Burman ‡	Masoom
1984 (31st)		Khayyam	Razia Sultan
1984 (31st)		Laxmikant–Pyarelal	Hero
1984 (31st)		R. D. Burman	Betaab
1984 (31st)		Usha Khanna	Souten
1985 (32nd)		Bappi Lahiri ‡	Sharaabi
1985 (32nd)		Anu Malik	Sohni Mahiwal
1985 (32nd)		Bappi Lahiri	Kasam Paida Karne Wale Ki
1985 (32nd)		Bappi Lahiri	Tohfa
1985 (32nd)		R. D. Burman	Jawaani
1986 (33rd)		Ravindra Jain ‡	Ram Teri Ganga Maili
1986 (33rd)		Laxmikant–Pyarelal	Meri Jung
1986 (33rd)		Laxmikant–Pyarelal	Pyaar Jhukta Nahin
1986 (33rd)		Laxmikant–Pyarelal	Sur Sangham
1986 (33rd)		R. D. Burman	Saagar
1987	NO CEREMONY		
1988	NO CEREMONY		
1989 (34th)	–	Anand–Milind ‡	Qayamat Se Qayamat Tak
1989 (34th)	–	Laxmikant–Pyarelal	Tezaab
1989 (34th)	–	Rajesh Roshan	Khoon Bhari Maang

=== 1990s ===
Year	Photos of winners	Music Director	Film
1990 (35th)	–	Raam Laxman ‡	Maine Pyar Kiya
1990 (35th)	–	Laxmikant–Pyarelal	Ram Lakhan
1990 (35th)	–	Shiv–Hari	Chandni
1990 (35th)	–	Kalyanji–Anandji	Tridev
1991 (36th)	–	Nadeem–Shravan ‡	Aashiqui
1991 (36th)	–	Anand–Milind	Baaghi
1991 (36th)	–	Anand–Milind	Dil
1992 (37th)	–	Nadeem–Shravan ‡	Saajan
1992 (37th)	–	Hridaynath Mangeshkar	Lekin...
1992 (37th)	–	Laxmikant–Pyarelal	Saudagar
1992 (37th)	–	Nadeem–Shravan	Phool Aur Kaante
1993 (38th)	–	Nadeem–Shravan ‡	Deewana
1993 (38th)	–	Anand–Milind	Beta
1993 (38th)	–	Jatin–Lalit	Jo Jeeta Wohi Sikandar
1994 (39th)		Anu Malik ‡	Baazigar
1994 (39th)		Bhupen Hazarika	Rudaali
1994 (39th)		Laxmikant–Pyarelal	Khalnayak
1994 (39th)		Nadeem–Shravan	Hum Hain Rahi Pyar Ke
1994 (39th)		Shiv–Hari	Darr
1995 (40th)		R. D. Burman (posthumous) ‡	1942: A Love Story
1995 (40th)		Anu Malik	Main Khiladi Tu Anari
1995 (40th)		Dilip Sen and Sameer Sen	Yeh Dillagi
1995 (40th)		Raam Laxman	Hum Aapke Hain Koun..!
1995 (40th)		Viju Shah	Mohra
1996 (41st)		A. R. Rahman ‡	Rangeela
1996 (41st)		Anu Malik	Akele Hum Akele Tum
1996 (41st)		Jatin–Lalit	Dilwale Dulhania Le Jayenge
1996 (41st)		Nadeem–Shravan	Raja
1996 (41st)		Rajesh Roshan	Karan Arjun
1997 (42nd)	–	Nadeem–Shravan ‡	Raja Hindustani
1997 (42nd)	–	Jatin–Lalit	Khamoshi
1997 (42nd)	–	Rajesh Roshan	Papa Kehte Hai
1997 (42nd)	–	Viju Shah	Tere Mere Sapne
1997 (42nd)	–	Vishal Bhardwaj	Maachis
1998 (43rd)	–	Uttam Singh ‡	Dil To Pagal Hai
1998 (43rd)	–	Anu Malik	Border
1998 (43rd)	–	Jatin–Lalit	Yes Boss
1998 (43rd)	–	Nadeem–Shravan	Pardes
1998 (43rd)	–	Viju Shah	Gupt
1999 (44th)		A. R. Rahman ‡	Dil Se..
1999 (44th)		Anu Malik	Soldier
1999 (44th)		Jatin–Lalit	Kuch Kuch Hota Hai
1999 (44th)		Jatin–Lalit	Pyaar To Hona Hi Tha
1999 (44th)		Viju Shah	Bade Miyan Chote Miyan

=== 2000s ===
Year	Photos of winners	Music Director	Film
2000 (45th)		A. R. Rahman ‡	Taal
2000 (45th)		Anu Malik	Biwi No.1
2000 (45th)		Anu Malik	Haseena Maan Jaayegi
2000 (45th)		Ismail Darbar	Hum Dil De Chuke Sanam
2000 (45th)		Jatin–Lalit	Sarfarosh
2001 (46th)		Rajesh Roshan ‡	Kaho Naa... Pyaar Hai
2001 (46th)		Anu Malik	Fiza
2001 (46th)		Anu Malik	Josh
2001 (46th)		Anu Malik	Refugee
2001 (46th)		Jatin–Lalit	Mohabbatein
2001 (46th)		Nadeem–Shravan	Dhadkan
2002 (47th)		A. R. Rahman ‡	Lagaan
2002 (47th)		Anu Malik	Mujhe Kucch Kehna Hai
2002 (47th)		Anu Malik	Asoka
2002 (47th)		Jatin–Lalit, Sandesh Shandilya Aadesh Srivastav	Kabhi Khushi Kabhie Gham
2002 (47th)		Shankar–Ehsaan–Loy	Dil Chahta Hai
Uttam Singh		Gadar: Ek Prem Katha	
2003 (48th)		A. R. Rahman ‡	Saathiya
2003 (48th)		Anand Raj Anand	Kaante
2003 (48th)		Himesh Reshammiya	Humraaz
2003 (48th)		Ismail Darbar	Devdas
2003 (48th)	Nadeem–Shravan	Raaz	
2004 (49th)		Shankar–Ehsaan–Loy ‡	Kal Ho Naa Ho
2004 (49th)		Anu Malik	LOC Kargil
2004 (49th)		Himesh Reshammiya	Tere Naam
2004 (49th)		Jatin–Lalit, Aadesh Shrivastava	Chalte Chalte
2004 (49th)		Rajesh Roshan	Koi... Mil Gaya
2005 (50th)		Anu Malik ‡	Main Hoon Na
2005 (50th)		A. R. Rahman	Swades
2005 (50th)		Anu Malik	Murder
2005 (50th)		Jatin–Lalit	Hum Tum
2005 (50th)		Pritam	Dhoom
2005 (50th)		Madan Mohan (posthumous)	Veer–Zaara
2006 (51st)		Shankar–Ehsaan–Loy ‡	Bunty Aur Babli
2006 (51st)		Adnan Sami	Lucky: No Time for Love
2006 (51st)		Himesh Reshammiya	Aashiq Banaya Aapne
2006 (51st)		Shantanu Moitra	Parineeta
2006 (51st)		Vishal–Shekhar	Dus
2007 (52nd)		A. R. Rahman ‡	Rang De Basanti
2007 (52nd)		Himesh Reshammiya	Aksar
2007 (52nd)		Jatin–Lalit	Fanaa
2007 (52nd)		Pritam	Dhoom 2
2007 (52nd)		Shankar–Ehsaan–Loy	Don
2007 (52nd)		Shankar–Ehsaan–Loy	Kabhi Alvida Naa Kehna
2008 (53rd)		A. R. Rahman ‡	Guru
2008 (53rd)		Vishal–Shekhar	Om Shanti Om
2008 (53rd)		Monty Sharma	Saawariya
2008 (53rd)		Pritam	Jab We Met
2008 (53rd)		Pritam	Life in a... Metro
2009 (54th)		A. R. Rahman ‡	Jaane Tu... Ya Jaane Na
2009 (54th)		A. R. Rahman	Ghajini
2009 (54th)		A. R. Rahman	Jodhaa Akbar
2009 (54th)		Pritam	Race
2009 (54th)		Shankar–Ehsaan–Loy	Rock On!!
2009 (54th)		Vishal–Shekhar	Dostana

=== 2010s ===
Year	Photos of winners	Music Director	Film
2010 (55th)		A. R. Rahman ‡	Delhi–6
2010 (55th)		Amit Trivedi	Dev.D
2010 (55th)		Pritam	Ajab Prem Ki Ghazab Kahani
2010 (55th)		Pritam	Love Aaj Kal
2010 (55th)		Shankar–Ehsaan–Loy	Wake Up Sid
2010 (55th)		Vishal Bhardwaj	Kaminey
2011 (56th)		Sajid–Wajid and Lalit Pandit ‡	Dabangg
2011 (56th)		Pritam	Once Upon a Time in Mumbaai
2011 (56th)		Shankar–Ehsaan–Loy	My Name Is Khan
2011 (56th)		Vishal Bhardwaj	Ishqiya
2011 (56th)		Vishal–Shekhar	Anjaana Anjaani
2011 (56th)		Vishal–Shekhar	I Hate Luv Storys
2012 (57th)		A. R. Rahman ‡	Rockstar
2012 (57th)		Ram Sampath	Delhi Belly
2012 (57th)		Shankar–Ehsaan–Loy	Zindagi Na Milegi Dobara
2012 (57th)		Sohail Sen	Mere Brother Ki Dulhan
2012 (57th)		Vishal–Shekhar	Ra.One
2013 (58th)		Pritam ‡	Barfi!
2013 (58th)		Amit Trivedi	Ishaqzaade
2013 (58th)		Pritam	Cocktail
2013 (58th)		Sneha Khanwalkar	Gangs Of Wasseypur
2013 (58th)		Vishal–Shekhar	Student Of The Year
2014 (59th)		Ankit Tiwari, Mithoon and Jeet Ganguly ‡	Aashiqui 2
2014 (59th)		A. R. Rahman	Raanjhanaa
2014 (59th)		Amit Trivedi	Lootera
2014 (59th)		Pritam	Yeh Jawaani Hai Deewani
2014 (59th)		Sanjay Leela Bhansali	Goliyon Ki Raasleela Ram–Leela
2014 (59th)		Vishal–Shekhar	Chennai Express
2015 (60th)		Shankar–Ehsaan–Loy ‡	2 States
2015 (60th)		Amit Trivedi	Queen
2015 (60th)		Himesh Reshammiya, Meet Bros Anjjan, Yo Yo Honey Singh	Kick
2015 (60th)		Mithoon, Ankit Tiwari, Soch	Ek Villain
2015 (60th)		Pritam, Anupam Amod, Arko Pravo Mukherjee, Yo Yo Honey Singh, Mithoon	Yaariyan
2016 (61st)		Amaal Mallik, Ankit Tiwari and Meet Bros Anjjan ‡	Roy
2016 (61st)		A. R. Rahman	Tamasha
2016 (61st)		Anupam Roy	Piku
2016 (61st)		Pritam	Dilwale
2016 (61st)		Sanjay Leela Bhansali	Bajirao Mastani
2016 (61st)		Shankar–Ehsaan–Loy	Dil Dhadakne Do
2017 (62nd)		Pritam ‡	Ae Dil Hai Mushkil
2017 (62nd)		Amaal Mallik, Badshah, Arko Pravo Mukherjee, Tanishk Bagchi, Benny Dayal, Nucleya	Kapoor & Sons
2017 (62nd)		Amit Trivedi	Udta Punjab
2017 (62nd)		Meet Bros, Amaal Mallik, Manj Musik, Ankit Tiwari	Baaghi
2017 (62nd)		Shankar–Ehsaan–Loy	Mirzya
2017 (62nd)		Vishal–Shekhar	Sultan
2018 (63rd)		Pritam ‡	Jagga Jasoos
2018 (63rd)		Amaal Mallik, Tanishk Bagchi, Akhil Sachdeva	Badrinath Ki Dulhania
2018 (63rd)		Amit Trivedi	Secret Superstar
2018 (63rd)		Arko Pravo Mukherjee, Tanishk Bagchi, Samira Koppikar, Sameer Uddin and Vayu	Bareilly Ki Barfi
2018 (63rd)		Mithoon, Tanishk Bagchi, Rishi Rich, Farhan Saeed, Rahul Mishra, Ami Mishra	Half Girlfriend
2018 (63rd)		Pritam	Jab Harry Met Sejal
2019 (64th)		Sanjay Leela Bhansali ‡	Padmaavat
2019 (64th)		Ajay–Atul	Dhadak
2019 (64th)		Ajay–Atul	Zero
2019 (64th)		Amaal Malik, Rochak Kohli, Yo Yo Honey Singh, Guru Randhawa, Zack Knight, Saurabh–Vaibhav and Rajat Nagpal	Sonu Ke Titu Ki Sweety
2019 (64th)		Amit Trivedi	Manmarziyaan
2019 (64th)		Shankar–Ehsaan–Loy	Raazi

=== 2020s ===
Year	Photos of winners	Music Director	Film
2020 (65th)	–	Amaal Malik, Mithoon, Vishal Mishra, Sachet–Parampara, Akhil Sachdeva‡	Kabir Singh
2020 (65th)	–	Zoya Akhtar, Ankur Tewari‡	Gully Boy
2020 (65th)	–	Arko Pravo Mukherjee, Tanishk Bagchi, Jasbir Jassi, Chirantan Bhatt, Gurmoh, Jasleen Royal	Kesari
2020 (65th)	–	Pritam	Kalank
2020 (65th)	–	Vishal–Shekhar	Bharat
2021 (66th)		Pritam ‡	Ludo
2021 (66th)		A. R. Rahman	Dil Bechara
2021 (66th)		Mithoon, Ankit Tiwari, Ved Sharma, The Fusion Project, Adnan Dhool and Rabi Ahmed	Malang
2021 (66th)		Pritam	Love Aaj Kal
2021 (66th)		Shankar–Ehsaan–Loy	Chhapaak
2022 (67th)	–	Tanishk Bagchi, B Praak, Jaani, Jasleen Royal, Javed–Mohsin And Vikram Montrose ‡	Shershaah
2022 (67th)	–	A. R. Rahman	Atrangi Re
2022 (67th)	–	A. R. Rahman	Mimi
2022 (67th)	–	Amaal Malik	Saina
2022 (67th)	–	Amit Trivedi	Haseen Dilruba
2022 (67th)	–	Sachin–Jigar	Chandigarh Kare Aashiqui
2023 (68th)		Pritam ‡	Brahmāstra: Part One – Shiva
2023 (68th)		Amit Trivedi	Uunchai
2023 (68th)		Pritam	Laal Singh Chaddha
2023 (68th)		Sanjay Leela Bhansali	Gangubai Kathiawadi
2023 (68th)		Sachin–Jigar	Bhediya
2024 (69th)	–	Pritam, Vishal Mishra, Harshavardhan Rameshwar, Shreyas Puranik, Ashim Kemson, Bhupinder Babbal, Jaani, Manan Bhardwaj	Animal
2024 (69th)	–	Anirudh Ravichander	Jawan
2024 (69th)	–	Pritam	Dunki
2024 (69th)	–	Pritam	Rocky Aur Rani Kii Prem Kahaani
2024 (69th)	–	Pritam	Tu Jhoothi Main Makkar
2024 (69th)	–	Sachin–Jigar	Zara Hatke Zara Bachke
2024 (69th)	–	Vishal–Shekhar	Pathaan
2025 (70th)		Ram Sampath	Laapataa Ladies
2025 (70th)		Rochak Kohli, Vishal Mishra, DJ Chetas-Lijo George, Prem-Hardeep, Karan Aujla, Abhijeet Srivastava	Bad Newz
2025 (70th)		Pritam, Tanishk Bagchi, Amaal Mallik, Sachet–Parampara, Aditya Rikhari, Lijo George–DJ Chetas	Bhool Bhulaiyaa 3
2025 (70th)		A. R. Rahman	Maidaan
2025 (70th)		Sachin–Jigar	Stree 2
2025 (70th)		Tanishk Bagchi, Sachin–Jigar, Mitraz	Teri Baaton Mein Aisa Uljha Jiya

== See also ==
- Filmfare Awards
- Bollywood
- Cinema of India
- Filmi music

== Notes ==
A:Naushad won the 1954 award for the song "Tu Ganga Ki Mauj", sung by Mohammed Rafi, and not the entire album.
B:S. D. Burman won the 1955 award for the song "Jaye To Jaye Kahan", sung by Talat Mahmood, and not the entire album.
