= Prem Nagar (1974 film) =

- Film poster
- Directed by: K. S. Prakash Rao
- Written by: Inder Raj Anand; Raj Baldev Raj
- Based on: Prema Nagar (1971) by Koduri Kausalya Devi
- Produced by: D. Rama Naidu
- Starring: Rajesh Khanna; Hema Malini; Kamini Kaushal; Prem Chopra; Bindu; Asrani; Nazir Hussain; Sulochana Latkar; Ramesh Deo
- Cinematography: A. Vincent
- Edited by: K. A. Marthand; J. Narasimha Rao
- Music by: S. D. Burman
- Production companies: Suresh Productions; Vauhini Studios; Vijaya Studios
- Distributed by: Vijaya and Suresh Combines
- Release date: 24 May 1974
- Running time: 158 minutes
- Country: India
- Language: Hindi

Prem Nagar (transl. City of Love) is a 1974 Indian Hindi-language romantic drama film, produced by D. Ramanaidu, directed by K. S. Prakash Rao, and starring Rajesh Khanna, Hema Malini, Kamini Kaushal, Prem Chopra, Bindu and Asrani in lead roles, with Ashok Kumar and Aruna Irani in guest appearances. It is a remake of director's own Telugu film Prema Nagar (1971).

== Plot ==
Karan Singh lives a wealthy lifestyle in a palace along with his widowed mother and his elder brother's family. His mother Rani Maa had left his upbringing to a nanny, to the extent that Karan believed she was his real mother. Karan has grown up to be a womanizer and an alcoholic. When Karan rescues former air hostess Lata, who is being molested by her boss, he hires her as his secretary and invites her family to move into one of his cottages. Lata attempts to change his bad habits. While she initially meets with opposition, she eventually succeeds and they fall in love. Karan builds a mansion to celebrate their love and names it Prem Nagar. However, their romance is shattered when Lata is accused of interfering in the palace affairs and then of stealing a valuable necklace. A much humiliated Lata and her family move away.

Karan later learns the truth about Lata's innocence but Lata would never return to him due to his initial distrust. Consequently, Karan's health worsens as he struggles with his addiction and eventually meets a tragic end.

== Cast ==
- Rajesh Khanna - Karan Singh / Chhotey Kunwar
- Hema Malini - Lata
- Kamini Kaushal - Rani Maa
- Prem Chopra - Shamsher Singh / Badey Kunwar
- Bindu - Shamsher's Wife
- Asrani - Takatram
- Nazir Hussain - Lata's Father
- Sulochana Latkar - Lata's Mother
- Ramesh Deo - Lata's Brother
- David - Diwanji
- Manmohan - Lata's Boss
- Nana Palshikar - Puran
- Ashok Kumar - Raja Upendra Singh
- Aruna Irani - Dancer in the song "Pyase Do Badan"

== Soundtrack ==
Prem Nagar

Soundtrack album by S. D. Burman
- Released: May 24, 1974
- Genre: Feature film soundtrack
- Length: 39:37
- Language: Hindi
- Label: Saregama
- Producer: S. D. Burman

S. D. Burman chronology
Us Paar (1974)	Prem Nagar (1974)	Sagina (1974)

The music was composed by S. D. Burman and the lyrics were penned by Anand Bakshi. R. D. Burman had worked on and completed some songs for the film for his father, as his father was still rehabilitating from his stroke during the pre-production of the film.

- "Yeh Lal Rang Kab Mujhe Chhodega" was listed at #9 on Binaca Geetmala annual list 1974.

Songs
No.	Title	Playback	Length
1.	"Thandi Hawaon ne, Pt. 1"	Kishore Kumar and Asha Bhosle	5:57
2.	"Thandi Hawaon ne, Pt. 2"	Kishore Kumar and Asha Bhosle	5:58
3.	"Kiska Mahal Hai Kiska Yeh Ghar Hai"	Kishore Kumar and Lata Mangeshkar	3:55
4.	"Yeh Lal Rang Kab Mujhe Chhodega"	Kishore Kumar	4:10
5.	"Yeh Kaisa Sur Mandir"	Lata Mangeshkar	4:44
6.	"Jaa Jaa Jaa"	Kishore Kumar	4:59
7.	"Bye Bye Miss Good Night"	Kishore Kumar	4:46
8.	"Pyase Do Badan Pyasi Raat Mein"	Asha Bhosle	5:26
9.	"Ik Muamma Hai"	Kishore Kumar
Total length:			39:37

== Accolades ==
22nd Filmfare Awards:
Nominated

- Filmfare Award for Best Cinematography — A. Vincent
- Filmfare Award for Best Actor — Rajesh Khanna
- Filmfare Award for Best Actress — Hema Malini
- Filmfare Award for Best Music Director — Sachin Dev Burman

== Reception ==
Released on 24 May 1974, Prem Nagar went on to become a blockbuster as well as the fourth highest-grossing film of the year, behind Roti Kapada Aur Makaan, Chor Machaye Shor and Dost. It ran for 25 weeks in Kolkata's famous Paradise Cinema.

The Hindu newspaper in its review of the film in 2015 quoted "Khanna is a perfect choice for the role, the drunkard scion of a royal family, blessed with a heart of gold. Technically the film scores highly on all spheres. Editing by K. A. Marthand and J. Narasimha Rao is slick and keeps the story moving at a steady pace, with no room for slackness."

After the premiere of Prem Nagar, Raj Kapoor kissed Khanna's hands and complimented him for the way he used them like swords in the climax. The film was considered special by Khanna himself, as it featured his favourite song, “Yeh Lal Rang” sung by Kishore Kumar.
