= 22nd Filmfare Awards =

1975 awards for Hindi cinema

- Date: 1975
- Site: Bombay

Highlights
- Best Film: Rajnigandha
- Best Actor: Rajesh Khanna for Avishkaar
- Best Actress: Jaya Bachchan for Kora Kagaz
- Most awards: Garm Hava & Roti Kapda Aur Makaan (3)
- Most nominations: Roti Kapda Aur Makaan (11)

The 22nd Filmfare Awards for Hindi cinema were held in Bombay in 1975.

Roti Kapda Aur Makaan led the ceremony with 11 nominations, followed by Kora Kagaz with 7 nominations and Garm Hava with 5 nominations.

Garm Hava and Roti Kapda Aur Makaan won 3 awards each, with the former winning Best Story (Ismat Chughtai & Kaifi Azmi), Best Screenplay (Shama Zaidi & Kaifi Azmi) and Best Dialogue (Kaifi Azmi), and the latter winning Best Director (Manoj Kumar), Best Lyricist (Santosh Anand for "Main Na Bhoolunga") and Best Male Playback Singer (Mahendra Kapoor for "Aur Nahin Bas Aur Nahin"), thus becoming the most-awarded films at the ceremony.

Rajesh Khanna received dual nominations for Best Actor for his performances in Avishkaar and Prem Nagar, winning for the former.

Hema Malini received dual nominations for Best Actress for her performances in Amir Garib and Prem Nagar, but lost to Jaya Bachchan who won the award for Kora Kagaz.

Premnath received dual nominations for Best Supporting Actor for his performances in Amir Garib and Roti Kapda Aur Makaan, but lost to Vinod Khanna who won the award for Haath Ki Safai, his only win in the category.

Bindu received dual nominations for Best Supporting Actress for her performances in Hawas and Imtihan, but lost to Durga Khote who won the award for Bidaai, her only win in the category.

== Main awards ==
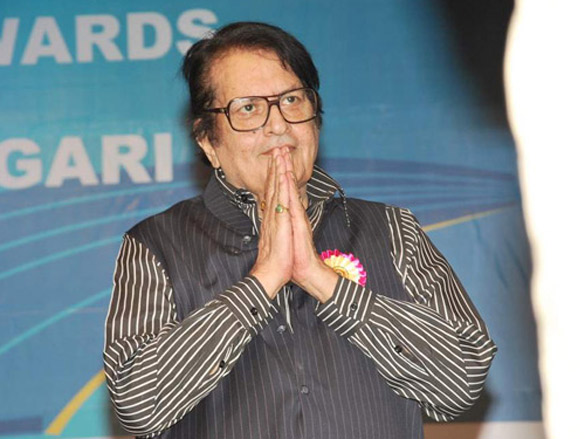
Manoj Kumar — Best Director winner for Roti Kapda Aur Makaan

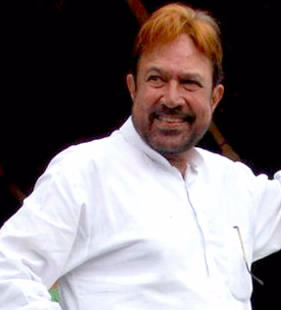
Rajesh Khanna — Best Actor winner for Avishkaar

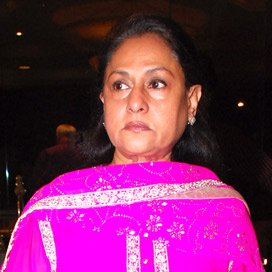
Jaya Bachchan — Best Actress winner for Kora Kagaz

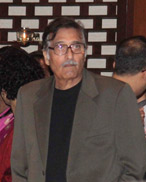
Vinod Khanna — Best Supporting Actor winner for Haath Ki Safai

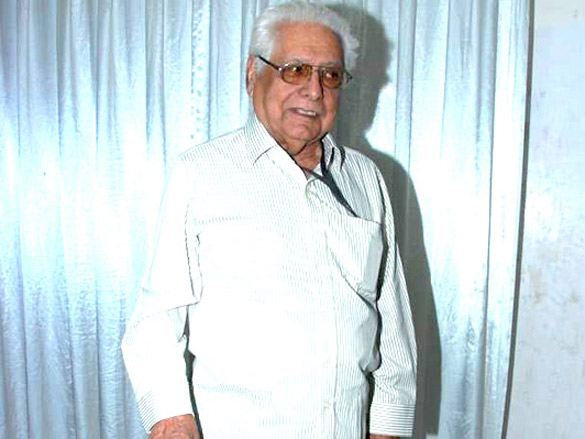
Basu Chatterjee — Best Film Critics winner for Rajnigandha

=== Best Film ===
Rajnigandha

- Ankur
- Garm Hava
- Kora Kagaz
- Roti Kapda Aur Makaan

=== Best Director ===
Manoj Kumar – Roti Kapda Aur Makaan

- Anil Ganguly – Kora Kagaz
- Basu Bhattacharya – Avishkaar
- M. S. Sathyu – Garm Hava
- Shyam Benegal – Ankur

=== Best Actor in a Leading Role ===
Rajesh Khanna – Avishkaar

- Dharmendra – Resham Ki Dori
- Dilip Kumar – Sagina
- Manoj Kumar – Roti Kapda Aur Makaan
- Rajesh Khanna – Prem Nagar

=== Best Actress in a Leading Role ===
Jaya Bachchan – Kora Kagaz

- Hema Malini – Amir Garib
- Hema Malini – Prem Nagar
- Saira Banu – Sagina
- Shabana Azmi – Ankur

=== Best Actor in a Supporting Role ===
Vinod Khanna – Haath Ki Safai

- Feroz Khan – International Crook
- Premnath – Amir Garib
- Premnath – Roti Kapda Aur Makaan
- Shatrughan Sinha – Dost

=== Best Actress in a Supporting Role ===
Durga Khote – Bidaai

- Bindu – Hawas
- Bindu – Imtihan
- Jayshree T. – Resham Ki Dori
- Moushumi Chatterjee – Roti Kapda Aur Makaan

=== Best Actor in a Comic Role ===
Mehmood – Vardaan

- Asrani – Bidaai
- Asrani – Chor Machaye Shor
- Mehmood – Duniya Ka Mela
- Mehmood – Kunwara Baap

=== Best Art Direction ===
Sagina – Sudhendu Roy

=== Best Cinematography ===
Prem Nagar – A. Vincent

=== Best Dialogue ===
Garm Hava – Kaifi Azmi

=== Best Editing ===
Roti – Kamlakar Karkhanis

=== Best Music Director ===
Kora Kagaz – Kalyanji–Anandji

- Aap Ki Kasam – R. D. Burman
- Prem Nagar – S. D. Burman
- Resham Ki Dori – Shankar–Jaikishan
- Roti Kapda Aur Makaan – Laxmikant–Pyarelal

=== Best Lyricist ===
Roti Kapda Aur Makaan – Santosh Anand for Main Na Bhoolunga

- Dost – Anand Bakshi for Gaadi Bula Rahi Hai
- Kora Kagaz – M. G. Hashmat for Mera Jeevan Kora Kagaz
- Resham Ki Dori – Indeevar for Behna Ne Bhai Ki Kalai
- Roti Kapda Aur Makaan – Santosh Anand for Aur Nahin Bas Aur Nahin

=== Best Playback Singer, Male ===
Roti Kapda Aur Makaan – Mahendra Kapoor for Aur Nahin Bas Aur Nahin

- Dost – Kishore Kumar for Gaadi Bula Rahi Hai
- Kora Kagaz – Kishore Kumar for Mera Jeevan Kora Kagaz
- Maa, Behen Aur Biwi – Mohammad Rafi for Accha Hi Hua
- Roti Kapda Aur Makaan – Mukesh for Main Na Bhoolunga

=== Best Playback Singer, Female ===
Pran Jaye Per Vachan Na Jaye – Asha Bhosle for Chain Se Hum Ko

- Bidaai – Asha Bhosle for Acche Samay Pe
- Hawas – Asha Bhosle for Yeh Hawas Hai
- Manoranjan – Asha Bhosle for Chori Chori
- Resham Ki Dori – Suman Kalyanpur for Behna Ne Bhai Ki Kalai

=== Best Screenplay ===
Garm Hava – Shama Zaidi & Kaifi Azmi

=== Best Story ===
Garm Hava – Ismat Chugtai & Kaifi Azmi

- Ankur – Shyam Benegal
- Bidaai – N. T. Rama Rao
- Kora Kagaz – Ashutosh Mukhopadhyay
- Roti Kapda Aur Makaan – Manoj Kumar

=== Best Sound ===
Amir Garib – L. H. Bhatia

== Critics' awards ==
=== Best Film ===
Rajnigandha

=== Best Documentary ===
The Nomad Puppeteer

== Biggest Winners ==
- Garm Hava – 3/5
- Roti Kapda Aur Makaan – 3/11
- Rajnigandha – 2/2
- Kora Kagaz – 2/7

== See also ==
- 24th Filmfare Awards
- 23rd Filmfare Awards
- Filmfare Awards
