= Filmfare Award for Best Supporting Actor =

Indian film award category

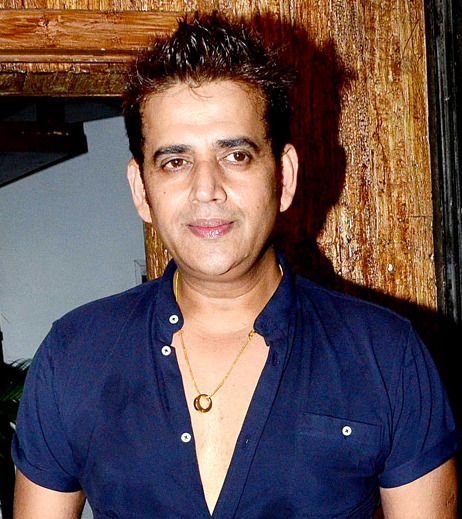
- The recent recipient: Ravi Kishan (2025)
- Awarded for: Best Performance by an Actor in a Supporting Role
- Country: India
- Presented by: Filmfare
- First award: David Abraham Cheulkar, Boot Polish (1955)
- Currently held by: Ravi Kishan for Laapataa Ladies (2025)
- Website: Filmfare Awards

The Filmfare Award for Best Supporting Actor is given by Filmfare as part of its annual Filmfare Awards for Hindi films, to recognise a male actor who has delivered an outstanding performance in a supporting role. Although the awards started in 1954, awards for the best supporting actor category started only in 1955. As of 2023, Anil Kapoor leads the list, with four wins. Vivek Oberoi (Company, 2003) holds the record for being the youngest recipient of the award, whereas Anil Kapoor has the record for being the oldest (Jugjugg Jeeyo, 2023). Abhishek Bachchan holds the record for winning the award thrice consecutively (2005, 2006 & 2007).

== Superlatives ==
Superlative	Actor	Record
Actor with most awards	Anil Kapoor	4
Actor with most nominations	Pran, Amitabh Bachchan	9
Actor with most consecutive wins	Abhishek Bachchan	3
Actor with most nominations without ever winning	Naseeruddin Shah	8
Actors with most nominations in a single year	Mehmood (1962), Raaj Kumar (1965), Feroz Khan (1970), Prem Nath (1974), Pran (1975), Amjad Khan (1981), Naseeruddin Shah (1983), Akshay Kumar (2005), Pankaj Tripathi (2021-2022)	2
Films with most nominations in a single year	3 Idiots (2010) – Boman Irani, R. Madhavan, Sharman Joshi; Raajneeti (2011) – Arjun Rampal, Manoj Bajpayee, Nana Patekar; Kapoor & Sons (2017) – Fawad Khan, Rajat Kapoor, Rishi Kapoor	3
Oldest winner	Anil Kapoor	66
Oldest nominee	Anil Kapoor	66
Youngest winner	Vivek Oberoi	26
Youngest nominee	Akshaye Khanna	22

== Multiple nominees ==
- 9 Nominations : Pran, Amitabh Bachchan
- 8 Nominations : Amrish Puri, Naseeruddin Shah
- 7 Nominations : Anupam Kher, Anil Kapoor
- 6 Nominations : Mehmood, Jackie Shroff, Abhishek Bachchan, Pankaj Tripathi⁣
- 5 Nominations : Raaj Kumar, Ashok Kumar, Amjad Khan, Om Puri, Nana Patekar

== Multiple winners ==
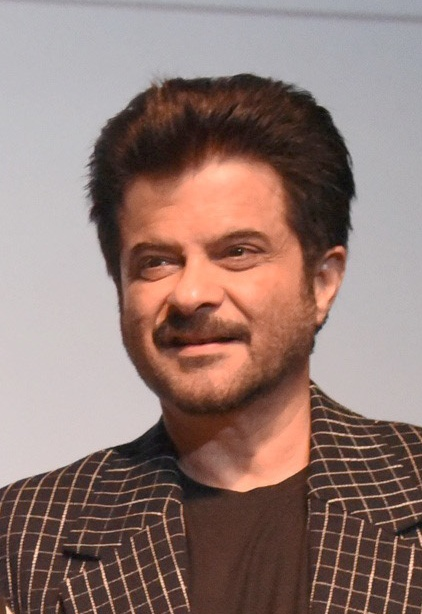
Anil Kapoor
(4 Wins)
- 4 Awards: Anil Kapoor
- 3 Awards: Pran, Amrish Puri, Amitabh Bachchan, Abhishek Bachchan
- 2 Awards: Saif Ali Khan, Motilal, Nana Palsikar, Raaj Kumar, Amjad Khan, Danny Denzongpa, Jackie Shroff, Vicky Kaushal

== List of winners ==
=== 1950s ===
Year	Photos of winners	Actor	Role(s)	Film	Ref
1955 (2nd)		David Abraham Cheulkar ‡	John	Boot Polish	
1955 (2nd)		No Other Nominee			
1956 (3rd)		Abhi Bhattacharya ‡	Shekhar	Jagriti	
1956 (3rd)		Johnny Walker	Johnny	Railway Platform	
1956 (3rd)		Ulhas	Inspector Sher Singh	Kundan	
1957 (4th)		Motilal ‡	Chunni Babu	Devdas	
1957 (4th)		Johnny Walker	Master	C.I.D.	
1958 (5th)		Raj Mehra ‡	Kashiram	Sharada	
1958 (5th)		Ajit	Krishna	Naya Daur	
1959 (6th)		Johnny Walker ‡	Charandas	Madhumati	
1959 (6th)		Rehman	Rehman	Phir Subha Hogi	
1959 (6th)		Sohrab Modi	Ezra	Yahudi	

=== 1960s ===
Year	Photos of winners	Actor	Role(s)	Film	Ref
1960 (7th)		Manmohan Krishna ‡	Abdul Rasheed	Dhool Ka Phool	
1960 (7th)		Raaj Kumar	Ram Lal	Paigham	
1960 (7th)		Mehmood	Mahesh	Chhoti Bahen	
1961 (8th)		Motilal ‡	Sir Jagdish Chandra Roy	Parakh	
1961 (8th)		Agha	Agha	Ghunghat	
1961 (8th)		Prithviraj Kapoor	Emperor Akbar	Mughal-e-Azam	
1961 (8th)		Rehman	Pyaare Mohan/Nawab Saheb	Chaudhvin Ka Chand	
1962 (9th)		Nana Palsikar ‡	Kaalia	Kanoon	
1962 (9th)		Mehmood	Mahesh	Sasural	
1962 (9th)		Pran	Raka	Jis Desh Men Ganga Behti Hai	
1963 (10th)		Mehmood ‡	Anokhe	Dil Tera Diwana	
1963 (10th)		Mehmood	Kasturi	Rakhi	
1963 (10th)		Rehman	Chhote Sarkar	Sahib Bibi Aur Ghulam	
1964 (11th)		Raaj Kumar ‡	Ram	Dil Ek Mandir	
1964 (11th)		Johnny Walker	Ghayal	Mere Mehboob	
1964 (11th)		Mehmood	Sunder	Ghar Basake Dekho	
1965 (12th)		Nana Palsikar ‡	Johnny	Shehar Aur Sapna	
1965 (12th)		Dharmendra	Ranjit	Ayee Milan Ki Bela	
1965 (12th)		Rajendra Kumar	Gopal Verma	Sangam	
1966 (13th)		Raaj Kumar ‡	Raju	Waqt	
1966 (13th)		Mehmood	The Butler	Gumnaam	
1966 (13th)		Raaj Kumar	Moti	Kaajal	
1967 (14th)		Ashok Kumar ‡	Gopal	Afsana	
1967 (14th)		Pran	Thakur Ramesh	Dil Diya Dard Liya	
1967 (14th)		Rehman	Amjad	Dil Ne Phir Yaad Kiya	
1968 (15th)		Pran ‡	Malang	Upkar	
1968 (15th)		Ashok Kumar	Shanti Swarup	Mehrban	
1968 (15th)		Om Prakash	Gokulchand	Dus Lakh	
1969 (16th)		Sanjeev Kumar ‡	Inspector Rai	Shikar	
1969 (16th)		Manoj Kumar	Dr. Shekhar	Aadmi	
1969 (16th)		Raaj Kumar	Chitrasen	Neelkamal	

=== 1970s ===
Year	Photos of winners	Actor	Role(s)	Film	Ref
1970 (17th)		Pran ‡	Shambhu Mahadev Rao	Aansoo Ban Gaye Phool	
1970 (17th)		Ashok Kumar	Shivnath 'Joggi Thakur' Choudhary	Aashirwad	
1970 (17th)		Balraj Sahni	Kailash Nath Kaushal	Ek Phool Do Mali	
1971 (18th)		Feroz Khan ‡	Jai Kishan "JK"	Aadmi Aur Insaan	
1971 (18th)		Prem Chopra	Boss	Himmat	
1971 (18th)		Feroz Khan	Shekhar Kapoor	Safar	
1972 (19th)		Amitabh Bachchan ‡	Dr. Bhaskar K. Bannerjee	Anand	
1972 (19th)		Pran	Shikari Banne Khan Bhopali	Adhikar	
1972 (19th)		Shatrughan Sinha	Thakur Arjun Singh	Paras	
1973 (20th)		Pran ‡	Ram Singh	Be-Imaan	
1973 (20th)		Prem Nath	Khan Badshah	Shor	
1974 (21st)		Amitabh Bachchan ‡	Vikram 'Vicky' Maharaj	Namak Haraam	
1974 (21st)		Ashok Kumar	Raja	Victoria No. 203	
1974 (21st)		Asrani	Chandru Kriplani	Abhimaan	
1974 (21st)		Pran	Sher Khan	Zanjeer	
1974 (21st)		Prem Nath	Jack Braganza	Bobby	
1975 (22nd)		Vinod Khanna ‡	Shankar Kumar	Haath Ki Safai	
1975 (22nd)		Feroz Khan	SP Rajesh	International Crook	
1975 (22nd)		Prem Nath	Daulatram	Amir Garib	
1975 (22nd)		Prem Nath	Harnam Singh	Roti Kapda Aur Makaan	
1975 (22nd)		Shatrughan Sinha	Gopichand 'Gopi' Sharma	Dost	
1976 (23rd)		Shashi Kapoor ‡	Ravi Verma	Deewar	
1976 (23rd)		Amjad Khan	Gabbar Singh	Sholay	
1976 (23rd)		Pran	Chaudhary Pratap Rai	Do Jhoot	
1976 (23rd)		Pran	Michael D'Souza	Majboor	
1976 (23rd)		Utpal Dutt	Maheem Ghoshal	Amanush	
1977 (24th)		Prem Chopra ‡	Ronjit Malik	Do Anjaane	
1977 (24th)		Ashok Kumar	Julius Nagendranath Wilfred Singh	Chhoti Si Baat	
1977 (24th)		Prem Chopra	Appa	Mehbooba	
1977 (24th)		Shashi Kapoor	Vijay Khanna	Kabhi Kabhie	
1977 (24th)		Vinod Khanna	Ajay Pirachand	Hera Pheri	
1978 (25th)		Shriram Lagoo ‡	Mr. Modi	Gharaonda	
1978 (25th)		Shriram Lagoo	Architect	Kinara	
1978 (25th)		Tariq	Sanjay Khan	Hum Kisise Kum Naheen	
1978 (25th)		Vikram	Chandramohan 'Chander' U. Nath	Aadmi Sadak Ka	
1978 (25th)		Vinod Mehra	Shrikanth Mathur	Anurodh	
1979 (26th)		Saeed Jaffrey ‡	Mir Roshan Ali	Shatranj Ke Khilari	
1979 (26th)		Danny Denzongpa	Inspector Lawrence	Devata	
1979 (26th)		Randhir Kapoor	Raju	Kasme Vaade	
1979 (26th)		Sanjeev Kumar	Raj Kumar Gupta	Trishul	
1979 (26th)		Vinod Khanna	Vishal Anand	Muqaddar Ka Sikandar	

=== 1980s ===
Year	Photos of winners	Actor	Role(s)	Film	Ref
1980 (27th)		Amjad Khan ‡	Fazlu	Dada	
1980 (27th)		Naseeruddin Shah	Sarfaraz Khan	Junoon	
1980 (27th)		Shatrughan Sinha	Mangal Singh	Kaala Patthar	
1980 (27th)		Utpal Dutt	Bhavani Shankar	Gol Maal	
1980 (27th)		Vinod Mehra	Kishan	Amar Deep	
1981 (28th)		Om Puri ‡	Bhikhu Lahniya	Aakrosh	
1981 (28th)		Amjad Khan	Inspector Amjad Khan	Qurbani	
1981 (28th)		Girish Karnad	Ravi Kapoor	Aasha	
1981 (28th)		Raj Kapoor	Abdullah	Abdullah	
1981 (28th)		Shriram Lagoo	Mr. Chandra	Insaf Ka Tarazu	
1982 (29th)		Amjad Khan ‡	Bishan	Yaarana	
1982 (29th)		Amjad Khan	Havaldar Sher Singh	Love Story	
1982 (29th)		Rakesh Roshan	Anil	Dhanwan	
1982 (29th)		Saeed Jaffery	Lalan Mian	Chashme Buddoor	
1982 (29th)		Suresh Oberoi	Ram Singh	Laawaris	
1983 (30th)		Shammi Kapoor ‡	Gurbaksh	Vidhaata	
1983 (30th)		Girish Karnad	Rakesh	Teri Kasam	
1983 (30th)		Sanjeev Kumar	Abu Baba	Vidhaata	
1983 (30th)		Shashi Kapoor	Raja	Namak Halaal	
1983 (30th)		Vinod Mehra	Dr. Prashant Chaturvedi	Bemisal	
1984 (31st)		Sadashiv Amrapurkar ‡	Rama Shetty	Ardh Satya	
1984 (31st)		Amitabh Bachchan	Jan Nisar Akhtar Khan	Andha Kanoon	
1984 (31st)		Naseeruddin Shah	Rajaram Purshottam Joshi	Katha	
1984 (31st)		Naseeruddin Shah	Tungrus	Mandi	
1984 (31st)		Raj Babbar	Raj Bedi	Agar Tum Na Hote	
1985 (32nd)		Anil Kapoor ‡	Raja	Mashaal	
1985 (32nd)		Danny Denzongpa	Raghuvir Singh	Kanoon Kya Karega	
1985 (32nd)		Nikhil Bhagat	Raghu	Hip Hip Hurray	
1985 (32nd)		Shafi Inamdar	Inspector Shafi	Aaj Ki Awaaz	
1985 (32nd)		Suresh Oberoi	Rahim	Ghar Ek Mandir	
1986 (33rd)		Amrish Puri ‡	G D Thakral	Meri Jung	
1986 (33rd)		Anupam Kher	Virendra	Janam	
1986 (33rd)		Kamal Haasan	Raja	Saagar	
1986 (33rd)		Kulbhushan Kharbanda	Havaldar Gopi Dada	Ghulami	
1986 (33rd)		Saeed Jaffery	Kunj Bihari	Ram Teri Ganga Maili	
1986 (33rd)		Utpal Dutt	Badri Prasad Sharma	Saaheb	
1987	NO CEREMONY				
1988	NO CEREMONY				
1989 (34th)		Anupam Kher ‡	Yodhraj Bhalla	Vijay	
1989 (34th)		Chunky Pandey	Baban	Tezaab	
1989 (34th)		Nana Patekar	S.P. Suhas Dandekar	Andha Yudh	

=== 1990s ===
Year	Photos of winners	Actor	Role(s)	Film	Ref
1990 (35th)		Nana Patekar ‡	Anna	Parinda	
1990 (35th)		Amrish Puri	Bhairav Singh	Tridev	
1990 (35th)		Mohsin Khan	Thakur Rajendra Singh	Batwara	
1990 (35th)		Pankaj Kapur	Inspector PK	Raakh	
1990 (35th)		Vinod Khanna	Lalit Khanna	Chandni	
1991 (36th)		Mithun Chakraborty ‡	Krishnan Iyer M.A.	Agneepath	
1991 (36th)		Anupam Kher	Hazari Prasad	Dil	
1991 (36th)		Om Puri	Joe D'Souza	Ghayal	
1991 (36th)		Rami Reddy	Gangster	Pratibandh	
1992 (37th)		Danny Denzongpa ‡	Sher Khan	Sanam Bewafa	
1992 (37th)		Amrish Puri	Nageshwar	Phool Aur Kaante	
1992 (37th)		Anupam Kher	Prem Anand	Lamhe	
1992 (37th)		Anupam Kher	Mandhari	Saudagar	
1992 (37th)		Saeed Jaffrey	Khan Baba	Henna	
1993 (38th)		Danny Denzongpa ‡	Khuda Baksh	Khuda Gawah	
1993 (38th)		Amrish Puri	Gopichand Verma	Muskurahat	
1993 (38th)		Nana Patekar	Jai	Raju Ban Gaya Gentleman	
1994 (39th)		Sunny Deol ‡	Govind	Damini	
1994 (39th)		Amrish Puri	Purshotam Kashinath Sathe	Gardish	
1994 (39th)		Jackie Shroff	Ram Kumar Sinha	Khalnayak	
1994 (39th)		Nana Patekar	Shivajirao Wagle	Tirangaa	
1994 (39th)		Naseeruddin Shah	Amar Verma	Sir	
1995 (40th)		Jackie Shroff ‡	Shubhankar	1942: A Love Story	
1995 (40th)		Anupam Kher	Prof. Siddharth Choudhury	Hum Aapke Hain Koun..!	
1995 (40th)		Mohnish Behl	Rajesh Nath	Hum Aapke Hain Koun..!	
1995 (40th)		Saif Ali Khan	Deepak Kumar	Main Khiladi Tu Anari	
1995 (40th)		Suniel Shetty	Vikram Singh	Dilwale	
1996 (41st)		Jackie Shroff ‡	Raj Kamal	Rangeela	
1996 (41st)		Amrish Puri	Baldev Singh Chaudhary	Dilwale Dulhania Le Jayenge	
1996 (41st)		Anil Kapoor	Angad Singh / Sikander	Trimurti	
1996 (41st)		Naseeruddin Shah	Raj Solanki	Naajayaz	
1996 (41st)		Paresh Rawal	Brijnath "Birju"	Raja	
1997 (42nd)		Amrish Puri ‡	Shambhunath	Ghatak: Lethal	
1997 (42nd)		Anupam Kher	Shambhunath Singh Rathod	Chaahat	
1997 (42nd)		Jackie Shroff	Suraj Kapoor	Agni Sakshi	
1997 (42nd)		Om Puri	Sanatan	Maachis	
1997 (42nd)		Salman Khan	Rajnath "Raju" Sahay	Jeet	
1998 (43rd)		Amrish Puri ‡	Raja Thakur	Virasat	
1998 (43rd)		Akshay Kumar	Ajay	Dil To Pagal Hai	
1998 (43rd)		Akshaye Khanna	Dharmvir	Border	
1998 (43rd)		Om Puri	Inspector Udham Singh	Gupt: The Hidden Truth	
1998 (43rd)		Suniel Shetty	Bhairav Singh	Border	
1999 (44th)		Salman Khan ‡	Aman Mehra	Kuch Kuch Hota Hai	
1999 (44th)		Arbaaz Khan	Vishal Thakur	Pyaar Kiya To Darna Kya	
1999 (44th)		Manoj Bajpai	Bhiku Mhatre	Satya	
1999 (44th)		Naseeruddin Shah	Maj. Sarfaraz Khan	China Gate	
1999 (44th)		Om Puri	Inspector Khan	Pyaar To Hona Hi Tha	

=== 2000s ===
Year	Photos of winners	Actor	Role(s)	Film	Ref
2000 (45th)		Anil Kapoor ‡	Vikrant Kapoor	Taal	
2000 (45th)		Mohnish Bahl	Vivek	Hum Saath-Saath Hain	
2000 (45th)		Mukesh Rishi	Inspector Salim	Sarfarosh	
2000 (45th)		Saif Ali Khan	Dhananjay "Jai" Pandit	Kachche Dhaage	
2000 (45th)		Sanjay Narvekar	Dedh Footiya	Vaastav: The Reality	
2001 (46th)		Amitabh Bachchan ‡	Narayan Shankar	Mohabbatein	
2001 (46th)		Atul Kulkarni	Shriram Abhyankar	Hey Ram	
2001 (46th)		Chandrachur Singh	Ajay	Kya Kehna	
2001 (46th)		Sayaji Shinde	Havaldar Gopinath Surve Patil	Kurukshetra	
2001 (46th)		Suniel Shetty	Ranger Mohammad Ashraf	Refugee	
2002 (47th)		Akshaye Khanna ‡	Siddharth 'Sid' Sinha	Dil Chahta Hai	
2002 (47th)		Ajay Devgn	Bulwa	Lajja	
2002 (47th)		Amitabh Bachchan	Yashvardhan 'Yash' Raichand	Kabhi Khushi Kabhie Gham	
2002 (47th)		Hrithik Roshan	Rohan Y. Raichand	Kabhi Khushi Kabhie Gham	
2002 (47th)		Jackie Shroff	Raj Singh Puri	Yaadein	
2003 (48th)		Vivek Oberoi ‡	Chandrakant 'Chandu' Nagre	Company	
2003 (48th)		Amitabh Bachchan	Vijay Singh Rajput	Aankhen	
2003 (48th)		Jackie Shroff	Chunnilal "Chunnibabu"	Devdas	
2003 (48th)		Mohanlal	Srinivasan	Company	
2003 (48th)		Sanjay Dutt	Jay 'Ajju' Rehan	Kaante	
2004 (49th)		Saif Ali Khan ‡	Rohit Patel	Kal Ho Naa Ho	
2004 (49th)		Abhishek Bachchan	Prem Kumar	Main Prem Ki Diwani Hoon	
2004 (49th)		Arshad Warsi	Circuit	Munna Bhai M.B.B.S.	
2004 (49th)		Manoj Bajpai	Gen. Yogender Singh Yadav	LOC Kargil	
2004 (49th)		Salman Khan	Alok Raj Malhotra	Baghban	
2005 (50th)		Abhishek Bachchan ‡	Lallan Singh	Yuva	
2005 (50th)		Akshay Kumar	Inspector Shekhar Verma	Khakee	
2005 (50th)		Akshay Kumar	Sunny Khurana	Mujhse Shaadi Karogi	
2005 (50th)		Amitabh Bachchan	Chaudhary Sumer Singh	Veer-Zaara	
2005 (50th)		Zayed Khan	Laxman Prasad Sharma	Main Hoon Na	
2006 (51st)		Abhishek Bachchan ‡	Shankar Nagre	Sarkar	
2006 (51st)		Amitabh Bachchan	DCP Dashrath Singh	Bunty Aur Babli	
2006 (51st)		Arshad Warsi	Ranjan 'Ron' Mathur	Salaam Namaste	
2006 (51st)		Naseeruddin Shah	Mohit	Iqbal	
2006 (51st)		Sanjay Dutt	Girish Sharma	Parineeta	
2007 (52nd)		Abhishek Bachchan ‡	Rishi Talwar	Kabhi Alvida Naa Kehna	
2007 (52nd)		Amitabh Bachchan	Samarjit 'Sam' Talwar	Kabhi Alvida Naa Kehna	
2007 (52nd)		John Abraham	Rajat Verma	Baabul	
2007 (52nd)		Kunal Kapoor	Aslam	Rang De Basanti	
2007 (52nd)		Siddharth	Karan R. Singhania	Rang De Basanti	
2008 (53rd)		Irrfan Khan ‡	Monty	Life in a... Metro	
2008 (53rd)		Aamir Khan	Ram Shankar Nikumbh	Taare Zameen Par	
2008 (53rd)		Anil Kapoor	Sagar "Majnu" Panday	Welcome	
2008 (53rd)		Mithun Chakraborty	Manikdas Gupta	Guru	
2008 (53rd)		Shreyas Talpade	Pappu Master	Om Shanti Om	
2009 (54th)		Arjun Rampal ‡	Joseph 'Joe' Mascarenhas	Rock On!!	
2009 (54th)		Abhishek Bachchan	Shankar Nagre	Sarkar Raj	
2009 (54th)		Prateik Babbar	Amit Mahant	Jaane Tu... Ya Jaane Na	
2009 (54th)		Sonu Sood	Chaudhary Sumer Singh	Jodhaa Akbar	
2009 (54th)		Tusshar Kapoor	Lucky	Golmaal Returns	
2009 (54th)		Vinay Pathak	Balwinder Khosla	Rab Ne Bana Di Jodi	

=== 2010s ===
Year	Photos of winners	Actor	Role(s)	Film	Ref
2010 (55th)		Boman Irani ‡	Viru Sahastrabuddhe	3 Idiots	
2010 (55th)		Amol Gupte	Sunil Shekhar Bhope	Kaminay	
2010 (55th)		Neil Nitin Mukesh	Omar Aijaz	New York	
2010 (55th)		R. Madhavan	Farhan Qureshi	3 Idiots	
2010 (55th)		Rishi Kapoor	Romy Rolly	Luck By Chance	
2010 (55th)		Sharman Joshi	Raju Rastogi	3 Idiots	
2011 (56th)		Ronit Roy ‡	Bhairav Singh	Udaan	
2011 (56th)		Arjun Rampal	Prithviraj Pratap	Raajneeti	
2011 (56th)		Arshad Warsi	Razzak Hussain aka Babban	Ishqiya	
2011 (56th)		Emraan Hashmi	Shoaib Khan	Once Upon a Time in Mumbaai	
2011 (56th)		Manoj Bajpai	Virendra Pratap	Raajneeti	
2011 (56th)		Nana Patekar	Brij Gopal	Raajneeti	
2012 (57th)		Farhan Akhtar ‡	Imran Habib	Zindagi Na Milegi Dobara	
2012 (57th)		Abhay Deol	Kabir Dewan	Zindagi Na Milegi Dobara	
2012 (57th)		Naseeruddin Shah	Suryakanth	The Dirty Picture	
2012 (57th)		Pitobash Tripathy	Mandook	Shor in the City	
2012 (57th)		Vir Das	Arup	Delhi Belly	
2013 (58th)		Annu Kapoor ‡	Dr. Baldev Chaddha	Vicky Donor	
2013 (58th)		Akshay Kumar	Krishna Vasudev Yadav	OMG – Oh My God!	
2013 (58th)		Emraan Hashmi	Joginder Parmar	Shanghai	
2013 (58th)		Nawazuddin Siddiqui	Taimur	Talaash: The Answer Lies Within	
2013 (58th)		Rishi Kapoor	Rauf Lala	Agneepath	
2014 (59th)		Nawazuddin Siddiqui ‡	Shaikh	The Lunchbox	
2014 (59th)		Aditya Roy Kapur	Avinash 'Avi' Yog	Yeh Jawaani Hai Deewani	
2014 (59th)		Anupam Kher	P. K. Sharma	Special 26	
2014 (59th)		Pankaj Kapur	Harphool Singh Mandola	Matru Ki Bijlee Ka Mandola	
2014 (59th)		Rajkummar Rao	Govind Patel	Kai Po Che!	
2014 (59th)		Vivek Oberoi	Kaal	Krrish 3	
2015 (60th)		Kay Kay Menon ‡	Khurram Meer	Haider	
2015 (60th)		Abhishek Bachchan	Nandu Bhide / Vicky Grover	Happy New Year	
2015 (60th)		Riteish Deshmukh	Rakesh Mahadkar	Ek Villain	
2015 (60th)		Ronit Roy	Vikram Malhotra	2 States	
2015 (60th)		Tahir Raj Bhasin	Karan Rastogi	Mardaani	
2016 (61st)		Anil Kapoor ‡	Kamal Mehra	Dil Dhadakne Do	
2016 (61st)		Deepak Dobriyal	Pappi Sharma	Tanu Weds Manu Returns	
2016 (61st)		Jimmy Shergill	Raja Awasthi	Tanu Weds Manu Returns	
2016 (61st)		Nawazuddin Siddiqui	Liak Mohammed Tungrekar	Badlapur	
2016 (61st)		Sanjay Mishra	Vidyadhar Pathak	Masaan	
2017 (62nd)		Rishi Kapoor ‡	Amarjeet "Dadu" Kapoor	Kapoor & Sons	
2017 (62nd)		Diljit Dosanjh	ASI Sartaj Singh	Udta Punjab	
2017 (62nd)		Fawad Khan	Rahul Kapoor	Kapoor & Sons	
2017 (62nd)		Jim Sarbh	Khalil	Neerja	
2017 (62nd)		Rajkummar Rao	Deepu Sebastian	Aligarh	
2017 (62nd)		Rajat Kapoor	Harsh Kapoor	Kapoor & Sons	
2018 (63rd)		Rajkummar Rao ‡	Pritam Vidrohi	Bareilly Ki Barfi	
2018 (63rd)		Aamir Khan	Shakti Kumar	Secret Superstar	
2018 (63rd)		Deepak Dobriyal	Shyamprakash Kori	Hindi Medium	
2018 (63rd)		Manav Kaul	Ashok Dubey	Tumhari Sulu	
2018 (63rd)		Nawazuddin Siddiqui	Daya Shankar Kapoor a.k.a. DK	Mom	
2018 (63rd)		Pankaj Tripathi	Assistant Commandant Aatma Singh	Newton	
2019 (64th)		Gajraj Rao ‡	Jeetendra Kaushik	Badhaai Ho	
2019 (64th)		Vicky Kaushal ‡	Kamlesh "Kamli" Kanhaiyalal Kapasi	Sanju	
2019 (64th)		Aparshakti Khurana	Bittu	Stree	
2019 (64th)		Jim Sarbh	Malik Kafur	Padmaavat	
2019 (64th)		Manoj Pahwa	Bilal Ali Mohammad	Mulk	
2019 (64th)		Pankaj Tripathi	Rudra	Stree	

=== 2020s ===
Year	Photos of winners	Actor	Role(s)	Film	Ref
2020 (65th)		Siddhant Chaturvedi ‡	Shrikant Bhosle "MC Sher"	Gully Boy	
2020 (65th)		Diljit Dosanjh	Honey Batra	Good Newwz	
2020 (65th)		Gulshan Devaiah	Karate Mani / Jimmy	Mard Ko Dard Nahi Hota	
2020 (65th)		Manoj Pahwa	Circle Officer Brahmadatt Singh	Article 15	
2020 (65th)		Ranvir Shorey	Vakil Singh	Sonchiriya	
2020 (65th)		Vijay Varma	Moeen	Gully Boy	
2021 (66th)		Saif Ali Khan ‡	Udaybhan Singh Rathore	Tanhaji	
2021 (66th)		Deepak Dobriyal	Gopi Ghasiteram Bansal	Angrezi Medium	
2021 (66th)		Gajraj Rao	Shankar Tripathi	Shubh Mangal Zyada Saavdhan	
2021 (66th)		Kumud Mishra	Sachin Sandhu	Thappad	
2021 (66th)		Pankaj Tripathi	Anup Saxena	Gunjan Saxena: The Kargil Girl	
2021 (66th)		Pankaj Tripathi	Rahul Satyendra “Sattu” Tripathi	Ludo	
2022 (67th)		Pankaj Tripathi ‡	Bhanu Pratap Pandey	Mimi	
2022 (67th)		Abhishek Banerjee	Eeshit Mehta	Rashmi Rocket	
2022 (67th)		Manav Kaul	Coach Sarvadhamaan Rajan	Saina	
2022 (67th)		Pankaj Tripathi	PR Man Singh	83	
2022 (67th)		Paran Bandopadhyay	Kali Krishna Paul	Bob Biswas	
2022 (67th)		Raj Arjun	R. N. Veerappan	Thalaivii	
2023 (68th)		Anil Kapoor ‡	Bheem Saini	Jugjugg Jeeyo	
2023 (68th)		Anupam Kher	Om Sharma	Uunchai	
2023 (68th)		Darshan Kumar	Krishna Pandit	The Kashmir Files	
2023 (68th)		Gulshan Devaiah	Guru Narayan	Badhaai Do	
2023 (68th)		Jaideep Ahlawat	Bhoora Singh Solanki	An Action Hero	
2023 (68th)		Manish Paul	Gurpreet Sharma	Jugjugg Jeeyo	
2023 (68th)		Mithun Chakraborty	IAS Brahmadutt	The Kashmir Files	
2024 (69th)		Vicky Kaushal ‡	Sukhi	Dunki	
2024 (69th)		Aditya Rawal	Nibras	Faraaz	
2024 (69th)		Anil Kapoor	Balbir Singh and Kailash Petkar	Animal	
2024 (69th)		Bobby Deol	Abrar Haque	Animal	
2024 (69th)		Emraan Hashmi	Aatish Rehman	Tiger 3	
2024 (69th)		Tota Roy Chowdhury	Chandon Chatterjee	Rocky Aur Rani Kii Prem Kahaani	
2025 (70th)		Ravi Kishan ‡	Inspector Shyam Manohar	Laapataa Ladies	
2025 (70th)		Pankaj Tripathi	Rudra Bhaiya	Stree 2	
2025 (70th)		Paresh Rawal	Paresh Goswami	Sarfira	
2025 (70th)		R. Madhavan	Vanraj Kashyap	Shaitaan	
2025 (70th)		Raghav Juyal	Fani Bhushan	Kill	

== See also ==
- Filmfare Awards
- Bollywood
- Cinema of India
