= Mahashrung =

Mountain peak

- Location within India Location within Ladakh

Highest point
- Elevation: 6,940 m (22,770 ft)
- Prominence: 827 m (2,713 ft)
- Coordinates: 35°24′36″N 77°13′03″E

Geography
- Location: Ladakh

Climbing
- First ascent: No records

Mahashrung is a mountain peak located at 6,940 m (22,770 ft) above sea level in the far west of the Transhimalaya.

== Location ==
The peak is located in the south of Padmanabh. It is one of the highest peaks on the Teram Shehr plateau. The prominence is at 827 m (2,713 ft).
