= Mere Sapno Ki Rani =

Song by Kishore Kumar

from the album Aradhana
- Language: Hindi
- Released: 1969
- Length: 5:00
- Label: Saregama
- Composer: Sachin Dev Burman
- Lyricist: Anand Bakshi

"Mere Sapno Ki Rani" (transl. The queen of my dreams) is a Hindi song from the 1969 Hindi film Aradhana. The song was composed by Sachin Dev Burman and performed by Kishore Kumar. In the film, Rajesh Khanna, the male protagonist, sings the song atop an open jeep virtually chasing the heroine, Sharmila Tagore, who was aboard the toy train in Darjeeling (Darjeeling Himalayan Railway). The song became a superhit in India. Many other versions of this song were made such as the song "Atha Dilisena Hiru" by famous Sri Lankan singer H. R. Jothipala The song was re-used in the Tamil film, Eli (2015). In 2026, virtual band Gorillaz included a cover of the song in the deluxe CD release of their ninth studio album The Mountain, with the cover performed by Hindu Jea Band Jaipur.

== Picturization ==
In the film, Rajesh Khanna stars as Arun Verma, a young pilot from the Indian Air Force. On the Darjeeling toy train, Sharmila Tagore is Vandana, a recent college graduate who is returning to her hill station home. Arun and his friend, Madan (Sujit Kumar) have taken leave without permission, and as Madan drives the open top jeep, Arun sings the song in Kishore Kumar's voice, flirtatiously eying Vandana, and later in the film, when they meet again, they fall in love.

== Trivia ==
Sharmila Tagore is seen reading Alistair MacLean's When Eight Bells Toll during this song.
