= Bidaai =

- Poster
- Directed by: L. V. Prasad
- Written by: Anand Kumar (dialogues)
- Screenplay by: L. V. Prasad
- Story by: N. T. Rama Rao
- Based on: Thalla? Pellama? by N. T. Rama Rao
- Produced by: L. V. Prasad
- Starring: Jeetendra; Leena Chandavarkar; Durga Khote; Asrani
- Cinematography: Jal Mistry
- Edited by: Shivaji Avdhut
- Music by: Laxmikant–Pyarelal
- Production company: Prasad Productions Pvt Ltd
- Release date: 1974
- Running time: 145 minutes
- Country: India
- Language: Hindi

Bidaai (transl. Farewell) is a 1974 Indian Hindi-language drama film, produced and directed by L. V. Prasad under his own banner Prasad Productions Pvt Ltd. It had Jeetendra, Leena Chandavarkar and Durga Khote in the lead roles. The film was a remake of the Telugu film Thalla? Pellama? (1970). Durga Khote, who played the widowed mother of Jeetendra and Satyen Kapu, won the Filmfare Award for Best Supporting Actress.

== Cast ==
- Jeetendra as Sudhakar
- Leena Chandavarkar as Padma Dharam Das
- Durga Khote as Parvati
- Madan Puri as Dharam Das
- Satyendra Kappu as Prabhakar
- Anwar Hussain as Magan
- Kanan Kaushal as Pooja
- Meena T. as Gauri
- Arpana Chodhury as Champa
- A. K. Hangal as Ramsharan
- Asrani as Murli/Bhaskar
- Satyajeet as Krishna
- Dinesh Hingoo as Ramu
- Birbal as Tirath Das
- Raj Varma as Bildichan
- Jayshree T. as Bhaskar's girlfriend
- Jagdeep as Shankar Lal
- Vikas Anand as Lawyer
- Pinchoo Kapoor as Judge

== Soundtrack ==
The music was composed by Laxmikant–Pyarelal and the lyrics were penned by Anand Bakshi.

- "Kabhi Khole Na Tijori Ka Tala" was listed at #13 on Binaca Geetmala annual list 1975.

#	Title	Singer(s)	Duration
1	"Kabhi Khole Na Tijori Ka Tala"	Kishore Kumar	5:34
2	"Yeh Hai Mera Premi"	Kishore Kumar, Lata Mangeshkar	6:38
3	"Bidaai Ki Phir Ghadi Aai"	Lata Mangeshkar	2:26
4	"Jai Jai Krishna"	Suman Kalyanpur	3:08
5	"Main Ja Rahi Thi"	Asha Bhosle	4:20
6	"Main Ne Tum Sang Pyar Kiya"	Lata Mangeshkar	4:33

== Accolades ==
Event	Category	Nominee	Result	Ref.
22nd Filmfare Awards	Best Supporting Actress	Durga Khote	Won	
22nd Filmfare Awards	Best Female Playback Singer	Asha Bhosle	Nominated	
22nd Filmfare Awards	Best Story	N. T. Rama Rao	Nominated	
22nd Filmfare Awards	Best Performance in a Comic Role	Asrani	Nominated	

== Reception ==
At the box office, Bidaai was a blockbuster and one of the highest-grossing films of the year. The success of the film marked Jeetendra's comeback after a series of unsuccessful films in 1972 and 1973.
