= Atma Ram (director) =

Indian film director

Atma Ram Padukone (21 August 1930 – 23 June 1994) was a Hindi film and TV director born in Calcutta. He was the younger brother of film maker Guru Dutt.

== Personal life ==
His father Shivshankar Padukone was a clerk at Burmah Shell and his mother was a teacher. He grew up with his three brothers – Guru Dutt (filmmaker), Devi Dutt (producer) and Vijay (advertising) - and his sister Lalitha Lajmi (painter and printmaker).

He studied at the University of Bombay (1952).

After doing some clerical work he joined the Socialist Party (1948–50).He was an active trade unionist and secretary of the Press Workers’ Union. He worked for a while in London (1958–61) directing films produced by Stuart Legg and Arthur Elton for the Shell Film Unit; also scripted documentaries for James Beveridge for India's Shell Film Unit (1955–62).

== Filmography ==
Umang was his first independent Atma Ram Films production, with the then unknown Subhash Ghai as actor. His Yeh Gulistan Hamara, for Guru Dutt Films, is a nationalist movie in which Dev Anand, on behalf of the Indian government, quells the North Eastern frontier tribals with love.

The Saira Banu and Vinod Khanna hit Aarop addressed corruption in journalism. He also made advertising films with his younger brother, Devi Dutt.

- 1993 Vividha (TV Series)
- 1992 Tulsidas
- 1990 Beesvah Unth (TV Series)
- 1988 J.P. (Documentary)
- 1988 Yeh Such Hai (Documentary)
- 1982 Pyaar Ke Rahi
- 1980 Khanjar
- 1978 Ramlal Shyamlal (TV Series)
- 1977 Aafat
- 1977 Ashanti Shantidas (TV Series)
- 1976 Ladoosingh Taxiwala (TV Series)
- 1975 Qaid
- 1974 Resham Ki Dori
- 1974 Aarop
- 1972 Yaar Mera
- 1972 Yeh Gulistan Hamara
- 1971 Memsaab
- 1970 Umang
- 1969 Chanda Aur Bijli
- 1968 Shikar
- 1964 Kaise Kahoon
- 1961 The Peaceful Revolution (Documentary)
- 1960 The Living Soil (Short documentary)
