= Kora Kagaz =

- Film poster
- Directed by: Anil Ganguly
- Written by: M.G. Hashmat (dialogue)
- Screenplay by: Surendra Shailaj
- Story by: Ashutosh Mukherjee
- Based on: Saat Pake Bandha (1963)
- Produced by: Sanat Kothari
- Starring: Vijay Anand; Jaya Bhaduri
- Cinematography: Bipin Gajjar
- Edited by: Waman Bhonsle; Gurudutt Shirali
- Music by: Kalyanji-Anandji
- Production company: Shreeji Films
- Distributed by: Eros International
- Release date: 10 May 1974
- Country: India
- Language: Hindi

Kora Kagaz (translation: Blank Paper) is a 1974 Indian Hindi-language drama film produced by Sanath Kothari and directed by Anil Ganguly. A remake of the Bengali film Saat Pake Bandha (1963) starring Suchitra Sen and Soumitra Chatterjee, which itself was based on a novel by Ashutosh Mukhopadhyay, the film stars Vijay Anand, Jaya Bhaduri, A.K. Hangal, Achala Sachdev and Deven Verma. The film's music is by Kalyanji Anandji. The title song "Mera Jeevan Kora Kagaz" (loosely translated as: "My life is a blank paper") was rendered by Kishore Kumar.

At the 22nd National Film Awards, it won the award for Best Popular Film Providing Wholesome Entertainment, while Lata Mangeshkar won the award for Best Female Playback Singer.

== Plot ==
Professor Sukesh Dutt and Archana Gupta meet by chance while traveling by the BEST bus service in Mumbai. Archana's father likes Sukesh, and both Archana and Sukesh are also attracted to each other and get married. Archana's mother does not like Sukesh due to his modest income. She makes up stories about their affluence, which offends Sukesh. She interferes in their life and buys things for them. It bruises his ego. All these things result in acrimony between Archana and Sukesh, and they decide to separate. Archana goes to live with her parents, while Sukesh relocates. Archana's family asks her to forget Sukesh, and remarry, which Archana finds difficult since she still has feelings for Sukesh. She goes to a far-off place to work as a teacher to find solace. One day Sukesh and Archana meet in a railway waiting room by chance. There, they resolve their misunderstandings and grievances. They reunite to live happily thereafter.

== Cast ==
- Vijay Anand as Professor Sukesh Dutt
- Jaya Bhaduri as Archana Gupta
- A. K. Hangal as Principal Gupta
- Achala Sachdev as Mrs. Gupta
- Nazneen as Aruna Gupta
- Dinesh Hingoo as Govind Gupta
- Deven Verma as Drona Acharya
- Ramesh Deo as Archana's Uncle
- Seema Deo as Archana's Aunt
- Sulochana Latkar as Sukesh's Aunt
- Arvind Rathod as Dasuda (servant)
- Master Shahid as Deepak

== Music ==
All lyrics written by M. G. Hashmat.

- The song "Mera Jeevan Kora Kagaz" topped the Binaca Geetmala annual list 1974

Song title	Singers	Length
"Mera Jeevan Kora Kagaz"	Kishore Kumar	3:35
"Mera Padhne Mein Nahin Lage Dil"	Lata Mangeshkar	3:01
"Roothe Roothe Piya"	Lata Mangeshkar	3:22

== Awards and nominations ==
National Film Awards:

- Best Popular Film Providing Wholesome Entertainment – Anil Ganguly
- Best Female Playback Singer – Lata Mangeshkar for "Roothe Roothe Piya"

22nd Filmfare Awards:

Won

- Best Actress – Jaya Bhaduri
- Best Music Director – Kalyanji-Anandji

=== Nominated ===
- Best Film – Sanat Kothari
- Best Director – Anil Ganguly
- Best Story – Ashutosh Mukhopadhyay
- Best Lyricist – M. G. Hashmat for "Mera Jeevan Kora Kagaz"
- Best Male Playback Singer – Kishore Kumar for "Mera Jeevan Kora Kagaz"

BFJA Awards:

- Kalyanji Anandji – Best Music Directors in Hindi film section
- M.G.Hashmat – Best Lyricist in Hindi film section
- Lata Mangeshkar – Best Female Playback Singer in Hindi film section
- Kishore Kumar – Best Male Playback Singer in Hindi film section
