= Aradhana (1969 film) =

1969 Indian romantic drama film

- Poster
- Directed by: Shakti Samanta
- Written by: Sachin Bhowmick
- Produced by: Shakti Samanta
- Starring: Sharmila Tagore; Rajesh Khanna; Sujit Kumar; Farida Jalal; Abhi Bhattacharya; Ashok Kumar
- Cinematography: Alok Dasgupta
- Edited by: Sahil Budhiraja
- Music by: S. D. Burman
- Distributed by: Shakti Films
- Release date: 27 September 1969
- Running time: 169 minutes
- Country: India
- Language: Hindi
- Box office: 7 Crore

Aradhana (transl. Worship) is a 1969 Indian Hindi musical romantic drama film directed by Shakti Samanta, starring Sharmila Tagore and Rajesh Khanna. It won the Filmfare Award for Best Film at the 17th Filmfare Awards. Tagore gave one of the best performances of her career and won Filmfare Best Actress Award. Originally released in Hindi and dubbed in Bengali, Aradhana's huge success led to two remakes: the Tamil film Sivagamiyin Selvan (1974) and the Telugu film Kannavari Kalalu (1974).

The film turned Khanna into an overnight sensation and is counted among the 17 consecutive hit films of Rajesh Khanna between 1969 and 1971, by adding the two hero films Marayada and Andaz to the 15 consecutive solo hits he gave from 1969 to 1971. It was a blockbuster in India and the Soviet Union as well as the highest-grossing film of the year. The theme of the movie was based on the 1946 film To Each His Own.

== Plot ==
Indian Air Force officer Arun Varma sings "Mere Sapno Ki Rani" in an open jeep winding along Darjeeling, West Bengal's hills with his co-pilot Madan. At the same time, Vandana, the daughter of Dr Gopal Tripathi casts glances from a train window, which Arun notices. Upon multiple meetings over a few days, they fall in love and get engaged. Excitedly, they secretly wed in a temple without rituals, only exchanging garlands, with God as the only witness, however they plan to get married in a formal ceremony in front of their relatives and friends. As it rains heavily, they take refuge in a shelter with a flickering fire, leading to them becoming intimate. Arun tells her not to be ashamed of their intimacy as they have accepted each other in every way in front of god. He promises to be back in some time to get married.

Within days, Arun dies in a plane crash. Vandana discovers that she is pregnant. Arun's family is unable to accept her as a daughter-in-law. Her father also dies, leaving her destitute. Vandana's son is born and named Suraj. She puts him up for adoption hoping to adopt him the next day legally but she is forced to let a childless couple adopt him. Determined to be a part of his life, she accepts the role of being his nanny. One day, her employer's brother-in-law, finding her alone in the house, attempts to molest her but Suraj rescues her by stabbing him to death and runs away. When the police arrive, Vandana takes the blame for the murder and is arrested.

Years later when Vandana is released, the jailor takes her to his home and introduces her to his daughter Renu. Vandana soon meets Renu's love, Suraj. He is the image of his father and a pilot too. He has the sensation of having seen Vandana before but his memories are fleeting. Anxious that the true story of his parents may cause him pain, Vandana tries to hide away.

Suraj is injured in an air crash like his father but survives. While he is recuperating in the hospital, Vandana meets Madan. He knows the truth of Arun and Vandana's romance and is anxious to tell Suraj all but Vandana fears the consequences. One day idly looking through papers in the room while waiting for Vandana, Suraj finds Arun's photo. A sudden realisation that Arun and Vandana are his true parents becomes clear. He recognizes his mother's sacrifices and celebrates her strength and courage.

== Cast ==
- Sharmila Tagore as Vandana “Veenu” Verma / Vandana Tripathi (Arun's Widow)
- Rajesh Khanna as Flight Lieutenant Arun Verma / Suraj Kumar Verma (Double Role)
- Sujit Kumar as Flight Lieutenant Madan Verma later Air Commodore
- Ashok Kumar as Air Commodore Ganguly (Retd)
- Pahari Sanyal as Gopal Tripathi
- Anita Guha as Mrs. Prasad Saxena
- Abhi Bhattacharya as Ram Prasad Saxena
- Manmohan - Shyam
- Madan Puri as the Jailor
- Asit Sen as Tikaram
- Farida Jalal as Renu Verma (Suraj's Wife)
- Subhash Ghai as Flight Lieutenant Prakash (Suraj's colleague and friend)
- Krishna Kant as Mr. Verma (Arun's Father)

== Production ==
The film was scripted by Sachin Bhowmick. The theme of the movie was based on the 1946 film To Each His Own. A day prior to the shooting of Aradhana, producer Surinder Kapoor showed Samanta his latest film, Ek Shrimaan Ek Shrimati with Shashi Kapoor as the lead, which was also written by Sachin Bhowmick. Much to his surprise, this film had a similar ending to his own film. The following day, Samanta decided to scrap his film, when writers Gulshan Nanda and Madhusudan Kalelkar visited his office. Upon hearing the issue, it was Gulshan Nanda who suggested to have a double role of father and son in the film. Originally, the first hero was to die by the interval and a new hero was to step in. The same evening, while Aradhana was being cancelled, Nanda recited a story of Kati Patang to Samanta, which he instantly liked, so for the next couple of hours they first rewrote the second half of Aradhana, and subsequently went on to discuss Kati Patang.

Asha Parekh was the first choice for the role of Vandana. However, she rejected the offer, as she did not want to play Rajesh Khanna's mother in the film. She later played the lead role in Kati Patang.

The "Roop Tera Mastana" song sequence, which lasted more than three minutes and 30 seconds, was filmed in a single take. Sharmila Tagore believes this was done due to time constraints. Shakti Samanta reminisces in an interview that he suggested to Rajesh Khanna that he mimic Dev Anand in his second role as a son. He did and it clicked.

== Soundtrack ==
Aradhana
- Original LP Cover

Soundtrack album to Aradhana by S. D. Burman, Kishore Kumar & R. D. Burman
- Released: 1969
- Genre: Feature film soundtrack
- Language: Hindi
- Label: EMI Records

The soundtrack of the film was composed by S. D. Burman, with lyrics by Anand Bakshi. Sachin Dev Burman had written the music for the songs of Aradhana. Rahul Dev Burman was the Assistant Music Director in this film. His main work was on arrangement, background score and improvising some tunes for the singer and helping his father in the process. All the tunes were composed by Sachin Dev Burman. Sachin Dev Burman himself was instrumental in putting up Kishore Kumar for the rising star Rajesh Khanna. It was the third best-selling Hindi film album of the 1960s, behind Sangam and Mere Mehboob.

In "Roop Tera Mastana", Kersi Lord played the accordion, Homi Mullan played the duggi, Manohari Singh played the saxophone and Buji Lord played the vibraphone. This track was also reused in Tamil Remix Version as "Jean Pants" sung by K.S. Chithra and Stylebhai.

No.	Title	Singer(s)	Length
1.	"Mere Sapno Ki Rani"	Kishore Kumar	5:00
2.	"Roop Tera Mastana"	Kishore Kumar	3:45
3.	"Kora Kagaz Tha Yeh Man Mera" (Raga Pahadi)	Kishore Kumar, Lata Mangeshkar	5:38
4.	"Chanda Hai Tu Mera Suraj Hai Tu" (Raga Bhoopali)	Lata Mangeshkar	4:02
5.	"Saphal Hogi Teri Aradhana"	S. D. Burman	5:45
6.	"Gun Guna Rahe Hai Bhanvare"	Mohammed Rafi, Asha Bhosle	3:53
7.	"Baghon Mein Bahar Hai"	Mohammed Rafi, Lata Mangeshkar	3:52
Total length:			31:55

Bengali track list
No.	Title	Singer(s)	Length
1.	"Mor Shopneri Shathi"	Kishore Kumar	4:50
2.	"Eto Kache Dujone"	Kishore Kumar	4:08
3.	"Gunjone Dole Je Bhromor"	Kishore Kumar, Asha Bhosle	4:34
4.	"Aj Hridoye Bhalobeshe"	Kishore Kumar, Lata Mangeshkar	5:56
5.	"Chondro Je Tui"	Lata Mangeshkar	3:50
6.	"Madhobi Futeche Oi"	Rahul Dev Burman, Lata Mangeshkar	3:59
Total length:			26:57

== Trivia ==
In the song 'Mere Sapno ki rani' Sharmila Tagore is seen reading a novel while in the train. The novel is 'When the eight bells toll' by author Alistair MacLean.

A movie of the same name was released in 1971, starring Anthony Hopkins.

== Awards ==
17th Filmfare Awards:

Won

- Best Film – Shakti Samanta
- Best Actress – Sharmila Tagore
- Best Male Playback Singer – Kishore Kumar for "Roop Tera Mastana"

Nominated

- Best Director – Shakti Samanta
- Best Actor – Rajesh Khanna
- Best Supporting Actress – Farida Jalal
- Best Music Director – S. D. Burman
- Best Lyricist – Anand Bakshi for "Mere Sapno Ki Rani"
- Best Story – Sachin Bhowmick

17th National Film Awards:

Won

- Best Male Playback Singer – S. D. Burman for "Safal Hogi Teri Aradhana"

== Box office ==
Aradhana estimated worldwide gross: ₹178.5 million ($23.62 million). Adjusted for inflation, this is equivalent to ₹11.37 billion in 2017, or ₹17.4 billion (US$180 million) in 2026.

- India: ₹70 million ($9.33 million) in 1969. Adjusted for inflation, this is equivalent to ₹5.9 billion in 2017. (Note: Inflation rate from 1993 to 2017: 21.38 times: Aankhen's domestic nett of ₹128.45 million in 1993 is equivalent to ₹2,745,845,840 in 2017.)
- Soviet Union: 11.85 million Rbls (Note: 47.4 million tickets sold, average ticket price of 25 kopecks) ($14.29 million, (Note: 0.829 Rbl per US dollar in 1972) ₹108.5 million) (Note: 7.5945 Indian rupees per US dollar in 1972.) in 1972. Adjusted for inflation, this is equivalent to $84 million (₹5.47 billion) in 2017.

In terms of estimated box office footfalls, it sold 42 million ticket sales in India (Note: See List of highest-grossing films in India § Films with highest footfalls) and 47.4 million tickets in the Soviet Union, for a combined 89.4 million tickets sold worldwide.

== Impact ==
Aradhana had a large impact on Indians in general. It inspired many to take up films as a vocation, one of them being the popular Indian actor Tom Alter, who confessed in an interview that he headed to Film and Television Institute of India after being impressed watching Rajesh Khanna in Aradhana in 1970.
