= Yeh Gulistan Hamara =

- Poster
- Directed by: Atmaram
- Screenplay by: Wajahat Mirza
- Starring: Dev Anand; Sharmila Tagore
- Music by: S. D. Burman
- Release date: 1 January 1972
- Country: India
- Language: Hindi

Ye Gulistan Hamara (transl. This Garden Is Ours) is a 1972 Indian Hindi-language drama film directed by Atmaram. The film stars Dev Anand, Sharmila Tagore, Pran, Sujit Kumar, Johnny Walker in pivotal roles, with music by S. D. Burman. Dialogue and screenplay are by Wajahat Mirza. The films depicts a tribal community living on the border with China; the song "Mera Naam Aao" was considered particularly offensive to the Ao Naga community in Nagaland.

== Plot ==
India is worried about its north eastern residents who are cut off from the mainland and are generally backward, illiterate and under developed. The government appoints special officer-cum-civil engineer Vijay to construct a bridge over a river next to the tribal village of Ding in the north eastern part of India. Ding is ruled by the cruel and autocratic Deng Do Rani and his henchmen Haku, Teju and trusted fighter Soo Reni. Deng Do Rani wants to sabotage the construction and sends Soo Reni and other warriors to demolish the bridge. They are captured by Vijay's officers and treated with respect and equality. Deng Do Rani sends others to kill the band captured, and the Indian Officers under the leadership of Vijay fight bravely to protect them. Soo Reni and her companions have a change of heart and pledge to support Vijay in his mission. Vijay and Soo Reni also fall in love with each other.

== Cast ==
- Dev Anand as Vijay
- Sharmila Tagore as Soo Reni
- Pran as Deng Do Rani
- Sujit Kumar as Teju
- Johnny Walker as Tuna's Boyfriend
- Jayshree T. as Tuna
- Kanan Kaushal as Mrs. Barua
- Lalita Pawar as Soo Reni's Mother
- Ramesh Deo as Inspector Barua
- Raj Mehra as Pal
- Sapru as Salvatore
- Keshto Mukherjee as Soldier
- G. Asrani as Asrani
- Jankidas as Haku
- Iftekhar as Vijay's Captain

== Production ==
Some scenes of the film were shot in Arunachal Pradesh.

== Soundtrack ==
All lyrics are written by Anand Bakshi; all music is composed by S.D. Burman. In the song "Kya Yeh Zindagi Hai", S.D. Burman has given the vocal for the line "Ek Baar Mila De Na" randomly. In the song "Raina Soyi Soyi", both S. D. Burman and R.D. Burman have given small vocal parts.

Ye Gulistan Hamara

Soundtrack album by S. D. Burman
- Released: 1972
- Genre: Feature film soundtrack
- Length: 24:00
- Language: Hindi
- Label: Saregama
- Producer: S. D. Burman

S. D. Burman chronology
Tere Mere Sapne (1971)	Ye Gulistan Hamara (1972)	Zindagi Zindagi (1972)

Songs
No.	Title	Singer(s)	Length
1.	"O Tushima Ri Tushima"	Lata Mangeshkar	3:12
2.	"He Suno Meri Baat"	Kishore Kumar	3:10
3.	"Kya Yeh Zindagi Hai"	Lata Mangeshkar	4:48
4.	"Raina Soyi Soyi Naina Jage Jage"	Lata Mangeshkar, R. D. Burman and S. D. Burman	6:15
5.	"Gori Gori Gaon Ki Gori Re"	Kishore Kumar and Lata Mangeshkar	4:07
6.	"Mera Naam Aao Mere Paas Aao"	Danny Denzongpa and Lata Mangeshkar	3:19
Total length:			24:00
