= Resham Ki Dori =

- Poster
- Directed by: Atma Ram
- Screenplay by: Ranjan Bose
- Produced by: T. C. Dewan
- Starring: Dharmendra; Saira Banu; Kumud Chugani
- Edited by: Y. G. Chavan
- Music by: Shankar-Jaikishan
- Distributed by: Modern Pictures
- Release date: 21 August 1974
- Running time: 141 minute
- Country: India
- Language: Hindi

Resham Ki Dori (transl. Thread of Silk) is a 1974 Bollywood film starring Dharmendra and Saira Banu.

== Cast ==
- Dharmendra as Ajit Singh
- Saira Banu as Anupama
- Kumud Chuggani as Rajjo
- Sujit Kumar as Dinesh
- Ramesh Deo as Police Inspector Ranbir
- Rajendernath as Banke Biharilal
- Rajan Haksar as Mastan
- Suresh as Mill owners Dharmendra’s Boss
- Sajjan as Vishal
- Meena T. as Sheela
- Sapru as Lala, Anupama's grandfather
- Shivraj as Bade Babu
- Janki Das as Baby's Guardian
- Bhagwan Sinha as Bihari
- Keshav Rana as Jailer
- Sachin as Young Ajit
- Madhu
- Ajit Singh Deol as Sher Singh
- Leela Mishra as Bade Babu's Wife (uncredited)
- Murad as The Judge (uncredited)
- Chand Usmani as Shanti (uncredited)
- Jayshree T. as Dancer in song "Sona Hai Chandi Hai"

== Soundtrack ==
Resham Ki Dori

Studio album by Shankar-Jaikishan
- Released: 31 December 1974
- Genre: Feature film soundtrack
- Label: Saregama
- Producer: T. C. Dewan

Music composed by Shankar-Jaikishan and lyrics by Indiwar, Gopaldas Neeraj & Hasrat Jaipuri.

Original Motion Pictures
Track	Song	Singer(s)	Lyric
1	Chamka Pasina Ban Ke Nagina	Kishore Kumar	Indiwar
2	Sona Hai Chandi Hai	Asha Bhosle & Chorus	Neeraj
3	Hai Jag Men Jiska Naam Amar	Manna Dey	Neeraj
4	Behna Ne Bhai Ki Kalai Se Pyar Bandha Hai	Suman Kalyanpur	Indiwar
5	Sone Ke Gehne Kyon Too Ne Pehne	Mohd. Rafi	Indiwar
6	Zohra Jamal Hoon Bemisal Hoon	Asha Bhosle	Hasrat Jaipuri

== Awards ==
22nd Filmfare Awards:

Nominated

- Best Actor – Dharmendra
- Best Supporting Actress – Jayshree T.
- Best Music Director – Shankar–Jaikishan
- Best Lyricist – Indeevar for "Behna Ne Bhai Ki Kalai"
- Best Female Playback Singer – Suman Kalyanpur for "Behna Ne Bhai Ki Kalai"
