= 17th Filmfare Awards =

1970 awards for Hindi cinema

- Date: May 11, 1970
- Site: Bombay

Highlights
- Best Film: Aradhana
- Best Actor: Ashok Kumar for Aashirwad
- Best Actress: Sharmila Tagore for Aradhana
- Most awards: Anokhi Raat (4)
- Most nominations: Aradhana (9)

The 17th Filmfare Awards were held on May 11, 1970, recognising the best Hindi cinema films released in 1969.

Aradhana led the ceremony with 9 nominations, followed by Jeene Ki Raah with 6 nominations, Ittefaq with 5 nominations, and Aashirwaad and Anokhi Raat with 4 nominations each.

Anokhi Raat won 4 awards, including Best Screenplay (Hrishikesh Mukherjee) and Best Dialogue (Anand Kumar), thus becoming the most-awarded film at the ceremony.

Rajesh Khanna received dual nominations for Best Actor for his performances in Aradhana and Ittefaq, but lost to Ashok Kumar who won the award for Aashirwaad.

== Main awards ==
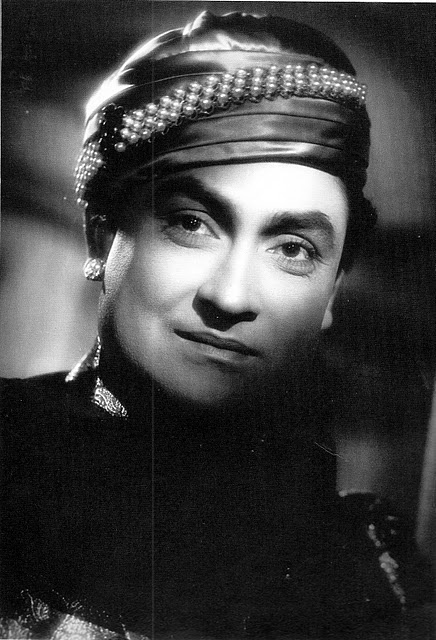
Ashok Kumar — Best Actor winner for Aashirwad

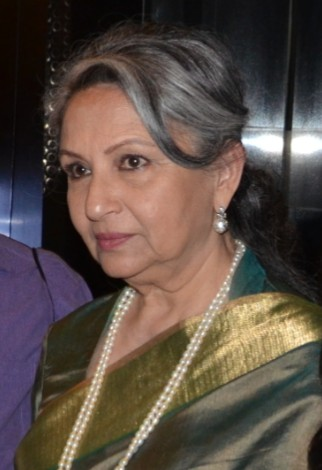
Sharmila Tagore — Best Actress winner for Aradhana

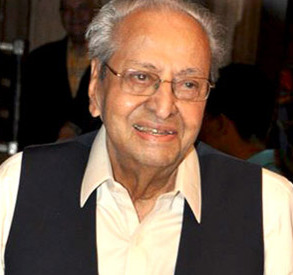
Pran — Best Supporting Actor winner for Aansoo Ban Gaye Phool

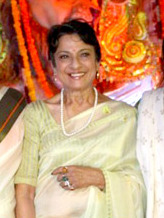
Tanuja — Best Supporting Actress winner for Paisa Ya Pyaar

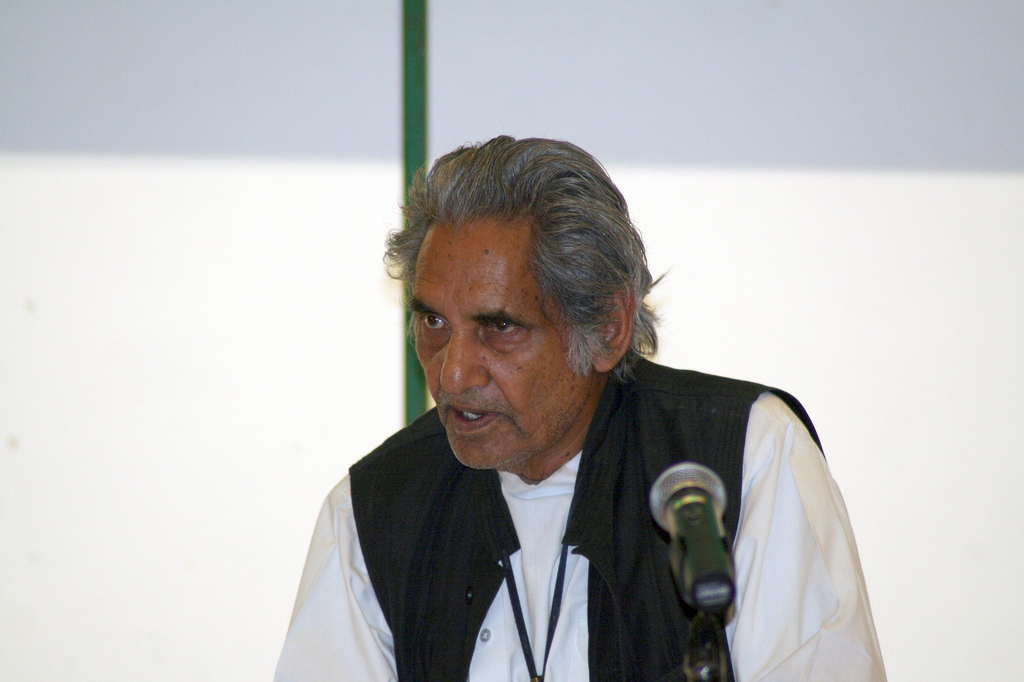
Neeraj — Best Lyricist winner for "Kal ka Paiyya" (Chanda Aur Bijli)

=== Best Film ===
Aradhana

- Aashirwad
- Jeene Ki Raah

=== Best Director ===
Yash Chopra – Ittefaq

- L. V. Prasad – Jeene Ki Raah
- Shakti Samanta – Aradhana

=== Best Actor ===
Ashok Kumar – Aashirwad

- Rajesh Khanna – Aradhana
- Rajesh Khanna – Ittefaq

=== Best Actress ===
Sharmila Tagore – Aradhana

- Asha Parekh – Chirag
- Nanda – Ittefaq

=== Best Supporting Actor ===
Pran – Aansoo Ban Gaye Phool

- Ashok Kumar – Aashirwad
- Balraj Sahni – Ek Phool Do Mali

=== Best Supporting Actress ===
Tanuja – Paisa Ya Pyaar

- Bindu – Ittefaq
- Farida Jalal – Aradhana

=== Best Comic Actor ===
Mehmood – Waris

- Johnny Walker – Haseena Maan Jayegi
- Mehmood – Meri Bhabhi

=== Best Story ===
Aansoo Ban Gaye Phool – Vasant Kanetkar

- Aashirwad – Hrishikesh Mukherjee
- Aradhana – Sachin Bhowmick

=== Best Screenplay ===
Anokhi Raat – Hrishikesh Mukherjee

=== Best Dialogue ===
Anokhi Raat – Anand Kumar

=== Best Music Director ===
Jeene Ki Raah – Laxmikant–Pyarelal

- Aradhana – S.D. Burman
- Chanda Aur Bijli – Shankar-Jaikishan

=== Best Lyricist ===
Chanda Aur Bijli – Gopaldas Neeraj for Kal Ka Paiyya

- Aradhana – Anand Bakshi for Mere Sapno Ki Rani
- Jeene Ki Raah – Anand Bakshi for Badi Mastani Hai

=== Best Playback Singer, Male ===
Aradhana – Kishore Kumar for Roop Tera Mastana

- Chanda Aur Bijli – Manna Dey for Kal Ka Paiyya
- Jeene Ki Raah – Mohammad Rafi for Badi Mastani Hai

=== Best Playback Singer, Female ===
Jeene Ki Raah – Lata Mangeshkar for Aap Mujhe Acche Lagne Lage

- Inteqam – Lata Mangeshkar for Kaise Rahun Chup
- Chanda Aur Bijli – Sharda for Tere Ang Ka Rang

=== Best Art Direction, B&W ===
Anokhi Raat – Ajit Banerjee

=== Best Art Direction, Color ===
Tamanna – A. R. Kakkad and Baburao T. Poddar

=== Best Cinematography, B&W ===
Anokhi Raat – Kamal Bose

=== Best Cinematography, Color ===
Duniya – Faredoon Irani

=== Best Editing ===
Nanha Farishta – B. S. Glaad

=== Best Sound ===
Ittefaq – M. A. Shaikh

== Critics' awards ==
=== Best Documentary ===
Then, The Rain

== Biggest Winners ==
- Anokhi Raat – 4/4
- Aashirwad – 1/4
- Aradhana – 3/9
- Ittefaq – 2/5
- Jeene Ki Raah – 2/6
- Aansoo Ban Gaye Phool – 2/2

== See also ==
- 19th Filmfare Awards
- 18th Filmfare Awards
- Filmfare Awards
