= Chanda Aur Bijli =

- Directed by: Atma Ram
- Written by: Wajahat Mirza
- Produced by: Atma Ram
- Starring: Sanjeev Kumar; Padmini
- Music by: Shankar-Jaikishan
- Release date: 1969
- Country: India
- Language: Hindi

Chanda Aur Bijli (English: Moon and Lightning) is a 1969 Bollywood film directed by Atma Ram. It stars Sanjeev Kumar, Padmini in lead roles. The film was dedicated to actor-filmmaker Guru Dutt. The story depicts the struggle of two lives, A beautiful street dancer Bijli (played by Padmini) is in a gang of thieves and Chanda (played by Sachin) is the heir to a posh household but due to the death of his parents lands up in an orphanage.

The film was simultaneously made in Tamil as Anadhai Anandhan, directed by Krishnan–Panju, which had a delayed release a year later.

== Plot ==
A beautiful street dancer Bijli is in a gang of petty thieves. Sachin is the heir to a heritage household but due to the death of his parents lands up in an orphanage. In the orphanage when the children are ill-treated by the manager, his conscience compels him to take a stand for the rest of the children. He dares to challenge the orphanage manager and is severely beaten and reprimanded. Meanwhile, the servant woman (midwife) who had helped to deliver him, and who stole his mother's bangles and other proof of his royal lineage is on her deathbed. She summons the orphanage manager and gives him the proof of Chanda's birth to atone for her sins before dying. But the orphanage manager plays mischief and along with the adopted son of the royal grandparents plans to eliminate Chanda. Chanda runs away and joins a petty thieves' gang by chance, but is unable to adapt himself to their ways. Soon during a robbery escapade in his own home he ends up in his original house. There, through many twists and turns of destiny he is able to contact his real grandparents, and also reform the gang of small time thieves.

== Cast ==
- Sanjeev Kumar as Sheroo
- Padmini as Bijli
- Jeevan as Bhagatram
- Bipin Gupta as Rajeshwarnath
- Pratima Devi as Mrs. Rajeshwarnath
- Bela Bose as Gauri
- Randhir as Dharamdas
- Ulhas as Ghanshyam
- Jankidas as Dindayal
- Mohan Choti as Kalidas
- Mehmood Jr. as Tingu
- Keshto Mukherjee as Raju
- Sachin as Chanda

== Soundtrack ==
The film's music was composed by Shankar–Jaikishan.

Song	Singer
"Ram Krishna Hari"	Manna Dey
"Tere Ang Ka Rang Hai"	Sharda
"Khud To Badnaam Hue, Humko Badnaam Kiya"	Mohammed Rafi, Asha Bhosle
"Dekh Tamasha Dekh"	Asha Bhosle
"Bijli Hoon Main"	Asha Bhosle
"Aaj Koi Aayega"	Asha Bhosle

== Awards and nominations ==
Neeraj was nominated for Filmfare Award for Best Lyricist in 1969 for "Ram Krishna Hari"
