= Padmanabh =

Mountain peak

- Location within India Location within Ladakh

Highest point
- Elevation: 7,030 m (23,060 ft)
- Prominence: 1,000 m (3,300 ft)
- Coordinates: 35°26′28″N 77°10′58″E

Geography
- Location: Ladakh

Climbing
- First ascent: 2002

Padmanabh is a mountain peak located at 7,030 m (23,060 ft) above sea level in the eastern part of the Karakoram.

== Location ==
The peak is located in the south of Lakshmi Kangri and in the north-west of Mahashrung. It is one of the highest peaks on the Teram Shehr plateau. The prominence is at 1,000 m (3,300 ft).

The first ascent of the mountain was made by a team of Japanese and Indian mountaineers via the south ridge. The Japanese climbers Hiroshi Sakai and Yasushi Tanahashi reached the summit on 25 June 2002.
