= Roti Kapada Aur Makaan =

1974 Indian film directed by Manoj Kumar

- Poster
- Directed by: Manoj Kumar
- Written by: Manoj Kumar
- Produced by: Manoj Kumar
- Starring: Manoj Kumar; Shashi Kapoor; Amitabh Bachchan; Zeenat Aman; Moushumi Chatterjee
- Cinematography: Nariman A. Irani
- Edited by: Manoj Kumar
- Music by: Laxmikant–Pyarelal
- Production companies: Chandivali Studio; Filmistan Studios; Mohan Studios; R.K. Studios; Rajkamal Studios
- Distributed by: V.I.P. Films; Digital Entertainment; Eros Entertainment; Shiva Films; Spark Worldwide
- Release date: 18 October 1974
- Running time: 161 mins
- Country: India
- Language: Hindi
- Box office: ₹5.25 crore (equivalent to ₹172 crore or US$18 million in 2026) (Nett)

Roti Kapada Aur Makaan (transl. Food, Cloth and Shelter; occasionally written as Roti Kapda Aur Makaan) is a 1974 Indian Hindi-language action drama film written, directed, and produced by Manoj Kumar, who also plays the leading role in the film. The title of the movie is based on the Hindi phrase, which refers to the bare necessities of life, popularized in the late 1960s by former Prime Minister Indira Gandhi, ahead of the 1967 general elections.

The film is about a family that Bharat (Manoj Kumar) attempts to provide for after falling into a financial struggle. The film also stars Amitabh Bachchan as Vijay, the brother of Bharat, and stars Zeenat Aman as Sheetal, Bharat's love interest, Moushumi Chatterjee as Tulsi, a friend of Bharat in poverty, and Shashi Kapoor as Mohan Babu, a wealthy businessman. It has been remade into the Telugu film Jeevana Poratam, and is still considered to be highly influential, and one of the best Bollywood films of its era.

== Plot ==
After the retirement of his father (Krishan Dhawan), it falls upon Bharat (Manoj Kumar) to look after his Delhi-based family. He has two younger college-going brothers, Vijay (Amitabh Bachchan) and Deepak (Dheeraj Kumar) and a sister of marriageable age, Champa (Meena T.). Although Bharat is a college graduate, the only work he can find is as a low-paid singer, much to the frustration of his girlfriend, Sheetal (Zeenat Aman). Meanwhile, Vijay has turned to crime as a last resort to provide for the family, but after an argument with Bharat, he leaves home to join the army.

Sheetal starts working as a secretary for rich businessman Mohan Babu (Shashi Kapoor) and Mohan becomes attracted to her. Sheetal loves Bharat but cannot contemplate a life in poverty. Bharat finally finds a job as a builder but starts to realise that Sheetal is slowly drifting away from him. Soon he loses his job after the government takes over the building site and his financial problems increase. When Mohan proposes marriage, Sheetal accepts, leaving Bharat heartbroken. Bharat loses his father soon after and is left devastated. He burns his diploma on his father's funeral pyre in frustration, .

Meanwhile, Champa has found a suitor, but Bharat has no money to pay for the wedding. Depressed at the state of his life, Bharat soon finds salvation by helping Tulsi (Moushumi Chatterjee) who lives in poverty. He also makes friends with Sardar Harnam Singh (Prem Nath) who comes to his rescue when he attempts to save Tulsi from a gang of hoodlums. He then receives an offer from a corrupt businessman named Nekiram (Madan Puri) who persuades Bharat to do his illegal activities so he and his family will come out of poverty, and he accepts.

Deepak joins the police force. Bharat, who is working for Nekiram, decides to inform the police about his malpractices. Nekiram finds out and frames Bharat instead. Deepak is the police officer appointed for arresting Bharat. Vijay joins forces with Bharat to stop Nekiram. During this conflict Sheetal, who is regretting her mistake of choosing wealth over her love, sacrifices her life. Bharat, Vijay, Deepak, Mohan Babu and Sardar Harnam Singh get Nekiram and his troops jailed in the end. Bharat sees Sheetal in Tulsi and accepts her as his wife.

== Cast ==
- Manoj Kumar as Bharat
- Shashi Kapoor as Mohan Babu
- Amitabh Bachchan as Vijay
- Zeenat Aman as Sheetal
- Moushmi Chatterjee as Tulsi
- Prem Nath as Harnam Singh
- Dheeraj Kumar as Deepak
- Kamini Kaushal as Bharat's mother
- Aruna Irani as Poonam
- Madan Puri as Nekiram
- Krishan Dhawan as Bharat's father
- Meena T as Champa
- Sulochana as Mohan's mother
- Raza Murad as Hamid Miya
- Raj Mehra
- Manmohan
- C S Dubey
- Darshan Lal
- Brahm Bhardwaj as Ramchand

== Soundtrack ==
The music was composed by the duo Laxmikant–Pyarelal and lyrics by Santosh Anand. Lyrics of "Mehngai Mar Gayi", "Hay Hay Yeh Majboori" and "Panditji Mere Marne Ke" were written by Verma Malik.

All lyrics are written by Verma Malik.

No.	Title	Singer(s)	Length
1.	"Hay Hay Yeh Majboori"	Lata Mangeshkar	04:16
2.	"Main Na Bhoolunga"	Lata Mangeshkar, Mukesh	05:39
3.	"Aur Nahin Bas Aur Nahin"	Mahendra Kapoor	06:25
4.	"Mehngai Mar Gayi" (Raga Bhairavi)	Lata Mangeskhar, Narendra Chanchal, Mukesh, Jaani Babu Qawwal	08:51
5.	"Panditji Mere Marne Ke"	Lata Mangeshkar	06:10
6.	"Main Na Bhoolunga (Sad)"	Lata Mangeshkar, Mukesh	06:00
Total length:			37:21

== Reception ==
This film was a major commercial success, emerging as the highest grossing Indian film of 1974, and was declared an all time blockbuster. The film received three Filmfare awards, as well as being nominated for eleven others.

=== Awards and nominations ===
Award	Category	Recipients and nominees	Results
22nd Filmfare Awards	Best Director	Manoj Kumar	Won
22nd Filmfare Awards	Best Lyricist	Santosh Anand for "Main Na Bhoolunga"	Won
22nd Filmfare Awards	Best Male Playback Singer	Mahendra Kapoor for "Aur Nahin Bus Aur Nahin"	Won
22nd Filmfare Awards	Best Film	Manoj Kumar	Nominated
22nd Filmfare Awards	Best Actor	Manoj Kumar	Nominated
22nd Filmfare Awards	Best Supporting Actor	Prem Nath	Nominated
22nd Filmfare Awards	Best Supporting Actress	Moushumi Chatterjee	Nominated
22nd Filmfare Awards	Best Music Director	Laxmikant–Pyarelal	Nominated
22nd Filmfare Awards	Best Lyricist	Santosh Anand for "Aur Nahin Bus Aur Nahin"	Nominated
22nd Filmfare Awards	Best Male Playback Singer	Mukesh for "Main Na Bhoolunga"	Nominated
22nd Filmfare Awards	Best Story	Manoj Kumar	Nominated
