= Amir Garib =

1974 film

- Poster
- Directed by: Mohan Kumar
- Written by: Mohan Kumar; K.A. Narayan; Ehsan Rizvi
- Produced by: Mohan Kumar
- Starring: Dev Anand; Hema Malini; Ranjeet; Sujit Kumar
- Cinematography: K.H. Kapadia
- Edited by: Pratap Bhatt; Pratap Dave
- Music by: Laxmikant–Pyarelal
- Production company: Mehboob Studios
- Distributed by: Emkay Productions
- Release date: 26 July 1974
- Country: India
- Language: Hindi

Amir Garib (transl. The rich and the poor) is a 1974 Indian Hindi-language masala film produced and directed by Mohan Kumar. The film stars Dev Anand, Hema Malini, Prem Nath, Tanuja, Sujit Kumar and Ranjeet. The film's music is by Laxmikant Pyarelal.

== Plot ==
Manmohan alias Moni lives a dual life. One as a musician, and the other as a thief with the name of Bagula Bhagat, whose prime agenda is to rob the rich, and spread the wealth with the poor. He meets with a young woman named Sunita alias Soni, and both fall in love with each other. Things change for the better for Soni, when she meets her wealthy long-lost father, Daulatram, and goes to live with him. She decides not to have to do anything with Moni. When Moni attempts to meet Soni to find out why she has rejected him, she refuses to meet him. Then Moni finds out that Soni is not who she claims she is, and definitely not the daughter of Daulatram, but the daughter of another wealthy man named Nandlal, who had died under mysterious and destitute circumstance.

== Cast ==
- Dev Anand as Manmohan "Moni"/Bagula Bhagat
- Hema Malini as Sunita "Soni"
- Tanuja as Rekha, Ranjeet's sister
- Prem Nath as Daulatram
- Ranjeet as Ranjeet
- Sujit Kumar as Police Inspector Anand and Anju's fiancé
- Nazima as Anju, Manmohan's sister
- Sajjan (actor) as Seth Nandlal, Sunita's father
- Raj Mehra as Police Commissioner Baldev
- Sulochana Latkar as Parvati
- Mehmood Jr. as Iqbal
- Chaman Puri as Baba
- Birbal as Sukhiram
- Mohan Choti as Murthi
- Mumtaz Begum as Pushpa
- Ram Mohan as Zamindar Baburao Deshmukh
- Krishnakant as Shankar
- Dulari as Sarla
- Tun Tun as Champakali
- Rajan Kapoor as Girish
- Moolchand as Seth Trikaal
- Helen as Dancer Monica
- Uma Dutt as Judge Tripathi
- Master Sailesh as Nikhil
- Master Ravi as Bhiku

== Production ==
Rajesh Khanna was originally cast in the lead role, but replaced with Anand due to his truancy from meetings with Kumar.

== Soundtrack ==
No.	Title	Singer(s)	Length
1.	"Moni Aur Soni Ki Hai Jodi"	Kishore Kumar
2.	"Baith Ja Khadi Ho Ja"	Kishore Kumar, Lata Mangeshkar
3.	"Kahin Janab Ko Mera To Intezar"	Kishore Kumar, Lata Mangeshkar
4.	"Mere Pyale Mein Sharab Daal De"	Kishore Kumar, Manna Dey
5.	"Main Aaya Hoon"	Kishore Kumar
6.	"Soni Aur Moni Ki Hai Jodi"	Lata Mangeshkar

== Trivia ==
In a scene, Dev Anand is seen riding a Victoria that has number 203, reminding on 1972 movie 'Victoria No.203'. K.A. Narayan was writer of both the movies.
