= Dost (1974 film) =

1974 film directed by Dulal Guha

- Theatrical poster
- Directed by: Dulal Guha
- Written by: Shafiq Ansari; Sachin Bhowmick
- Produced by: Premji; J. N. Manchanda
- Starring: Dharmendra; Hema Malini; Shatrughan Sinha
- Cinematography: M. Rajaram
- Edited by: Bimal Roy Jr.
- Music by: Laxmikant–Pyarelal; Anand Bakshi (Lyrics)
- Release date: 12 April 1974
- Running time: 166 mins
- Country: India
- Language: Hindi

For other films, see Dost (disambiguation)

Dost (transl. Friend) is a 1974 Hindi film. Produced by Premji, it was directed by Dulal Guha. The film stars Dharmendra, Hema Malini, Shatrughan Sinha, Asit Sen and Rehman. Amitabh Bachchan makes a guest appearance. The film's music is by Laxmikant–Pyarelal.

== Plot ==
Maanav is an orphan who was brought up by a Catholic Priest, Father Francis in Shimla. After completing his M.A. he returns home to Tara Devi, a locality in Shimla, and finds out that his mentor is dead. He re-locates to Bombay by train, and a man named Gopichand Sharma attempts to steal his luggage, but Maanav chases him and retrieves it. The men become friends, despite their differences - Maanav wants to lead an honest life, and Gopichand, who is estranged from his wife, a nurse, Kalyani, and son, Munna, is an alcoholic and thief. Gopichand eventually changes his lifestyle, decides to be honest, patches up with his family, but ends up antagonizing his crime boss, Monto Sardar, who chops off his right hand. Maanav gets him a job with Hercules Milk Foods. Maanav meets with and falls in love with Kaajal Gupta, who is the daughter of the owner of Hercules Milk Foods, much to the chagrin of her father, who wants her to marry Shyamal. Then one day Maanav disappears from Gopichand and Kaajal's lives. He re-locates to Simla and it is here that he learns that things have spiraled out of control as Gopichand has been arrested for marketing contaminated milk powder resulting in the deaths of hundreds of children. Maanav decides to return to Bombay and attempts to make sense as to why Gopichand committed this crime.

== Cast ==
- Dharmendra as Manav
- Hema Malini as Kaajal "Kaju" Gupta
- Shatrughan Sinha as Gopichand "Gopi" Sharma
- Amitabh Bachchan as Anand (Guest Appearance, uncredited)
- Ravindra Kapoor as Shyamal
- Kanhaiyalal as Ghadi Babu
- Anwar Hussain as Ustad Monto Sardar
- Abhi Bhattacharya as Father Francis
- Ramayan Tiwari as Gupta's ex-servant released from jail
- Kumari Naaz as Kalyani Sharma
- Master Bunty as Munna Sharma
- Master Raju as Rajesh "Raju" Gupta
- MMaruti Rao as Akbar
- Rehman as Mr. Gupta (Kaajal's Father)
- H. L. Pardesi as Petty Thief
- Heena Kausar as Bindu (as Hina Kausar)
- Raj Mehra as Police Commissioner
- Asit Sen as the Police Inspector who arrested Kaajal
- Satyendra Kapoor as Father Rebello (as Satyendra Kapoor)
- Chand Usmani In a guest appearance
- Jagdish Raj as Police Inspector who paid visit to Mr. Gupta after Shyamal's death (uncredited)

== Awards ==
22nd Filmfare Awards:

Nominated

- Best Supporting Actor – Shatrughan Sinha
- Best Lyricist – Anand Bakshi for "Gaadi Bula Rahi Hai"
- Best Male Playback Singer – Kishore Kumar for "Gaadi Bula Rahi Hai"

== Soundtrack ==
#	Title	Singer(s)
1	"Gaadi Bula Rahi Hai"	Kishore Kumar
2	"Duniya Jab Jalti Hai"	Lata Mangeshkar
3	"Aa Bata De Tujhe Kaise Jeete Hain Bhala"	Mohammed Rafi, Lata Mangeshkar, Shatrughan Sinha
