= Chor Machaye Shor =

- Poster
- Directed by: Ashok Roy
- Written by: S. M. Abbas; Dhruva Chatterjee; Tarun Ghosh
- Produced by: N.N. Sippy
- Starring: Shashi Kapoor; Mumtaz; Asrani; Danny Denzongpa
- Cinematography: K.H. Kapadia
- Edited by: Waman B. Bhosle; Gurudutt Shirali
- Music by: Ravindra Jain
- Production companies: Chandivali Studio; Filmalaya Studio; Filmistan Studio; K. Asif Studios
- Distributed by: N.N. Sippy Productions; Ultra Distributors
- Release date: 18 March 1974
- Country: India
- Language: Hindi
- Box office: ₹3 crore (Nett)

Chor Machaye Shor (transl. The thief makes noise) is a 1974 Indian Hindi-language film directed by Ashok Roy and produced by N. N. Sippy. The film stars Shashi Kapoor, Mumtaz, Danny Denzongpa, Madan Puri, Asrani and Asit Sen in main roles. The music is by Ravindra Jain. Asrani earned a Filmfare nomination for best performance in a comic role, the only nomination for the film. The film became a "superhit" and earned the second spot at the box office in 1974. It was filmed at the Pratapgad fort in Maharashtra.

Producer (N. N. Sippy), cast (Shashi Kapoor, Danny Denzongpa, Asrani, Madan Puri) and music composer (Ravindra Jain) teamed up again for Fakira (1976), which also became a box office hit.

"Le Jayenge, Le Jayenge Dilwale Dulhaniya Le Jayenge" is a very popular song from the film which Dilwale Dulhania Le Jayenge (1995) later adopted it as its film title. The film was remade in Telugu as Bhale Dongalu (1976).

== Plot ==
Vijay Sharma (Shashi Kapoor), an engineer, falls in love with Rekha (Mumtaz), a wealthy young woman. However, Rekha's father disapproves of their relationship because Vijay is poor and arranges for her to marry the son of a corrupt politician (Madan Puri). Rekha's father and the politician conspire to frame Vijay for a crime he did not commit, resulting in his imprisonment. In jail, Vijay befriends three fellow prisoners, and the four eventually escape together.

After escaping, Vijay reunites with Rekha. Together, they set out to save the small village of Shantinagar, whose inhabitants are being terrorised by the politician and a gang of bandits. Their efforts lead to the politician's arrest. Having accomplished their mission, Vijay and his three companions return to prison.

Meanwhile, Rekha's father regrets his actions and accepts Vijay as his future son-in-law. The film concludes on an optimistic note, suggesting that the prison sentences of all four men will be reduced.

== Cast ==
- Shashi Kapoor as Vijay Sharma
- Mumtaz as Rekha
- Madan Puri as Seth Jamunadas
- Danny Denzongpa as Raju Ustad
- Asrani as Bhalua
- Meena T as Chandramukhi
- Tarun Ghosh as Kalua
- Kamal Kapoor as Jagdish, Rekha,s father
- Asit Sen as Thanedar
- Chaman Puri as Mukhiya
- Sajjan as Amritlal
- Moolchand
- Sajjan
- Ram Mohan
- Uma Dutt
- Chandrima Bhaduri
- Shyam Kumar
- Master Chintu
- Hangama

== Soundtrack ==
The song of this movie was composed by the late Ravindra Jain. This was his third movie as music director. The lyrics of "Le Jayenge, Le Jayenge Dilwale Dulhaniya Le Jayenge" and "Ek Dal Par Tota Bole, Ek Dal Par Maina" were written by Inderjeet Singh Tulsi. The remaining were written by Ravindra Jain. 'Ek Dal Par Tota Bole' was shot in Mahabaleshwar and the 'elephant head point' is seen in the background.

| No. | Title | Singer(s) | Length |
|---|---|---|---|
| 1. | "Le Jayenge, Le Jayenge Dilwale Dulhaniya Le Jayenge" | Kishore Kumar, Asha Bhosle |
| 2. | "Ghunghroo Ki Tarah" (Raga Jhinjhoti) | Kishore Kumar |
| 3. | "Agre Se Ghaghro Manga De" | Asha Bhosle |
| 4. | "Ek Dal Par Tota Bole, Ek Dal Par Maina" | Lata Mangeshkar, Mohammad Rafi |
| 5. | "Paon Mein Dori, Dori Mein Ghunghroo" | Mohammad Rafi, Asha Bhosle |

== Legacy ==
The title of the 1995 blockbuster film Dilwale Dulhaniya Le Jayenge, was inspired by the song "Le Jayenge, Le Jayenge Dilwale Dulhania Le Jayenge" from this film.
