= Aap Ki Kasam =

1974 Hindi language film

- Directed by: J. Om Prakash
- Written by: Ram Kelkar; Ramesh Pant
- Produced by: J. Om Prakash
- Starring: Rajesh Khanna; Mumtaz; Sanjeev Kumar
- Cinematography: V. Babasaheb
- Edited by: Pratap Dave
- Music by: Rahul Dev Burman; Anand Bakshi (lyrics)
- Distributed by: Filmyug Pvt. Ltd; Shemaroo Video Pvt. Ltd.
- Release date: 17 April 1974
- Running time: 154 minutes
- Country: India
- Language: Hindi

Aap Ki Kasam (English: I swear by you) is a 1974 Indian Hindi romance film produced by J. Om Prakash, which also marks his directorial debut. The film stars Rajesh Khanna, Mumtaz, Sanjeev Kumar, Rehman, Asrani and A. K. Hangal. The music is by R.D. Burman, who received the only Filmfare nomination for the film.

The film is a remake of the Malayalam film Vaazhve Mayam (1970), directed by K. S. Sethumadhavan, where the ending was different. The film was later also remade in Telugu, retaining the original ending, by director Dasari Narayana Rao as Edadugula Bandham, (1985) starring Mohan Babu and Jayasudha.

== Plot ==
Kamal Bhatnagar is a studious young man from a middle-class family while, Sunita is a wealthy girl. One day, Kamal and Sunita meet, however, a misunderstanding is caused but later, it gets cleared up. Sunita and Kamal fall in love and decide to get married. They get married with the consent of their respective families. They lead a happy life. Kamal also gets a house and a job with the help of his best friend, Mohan. Mohan is a kind and jovial man but leads an unhappy life because of his shrewd and wicked wife. Taking pity on him, Sunita befriends Mohan.

Though, Kamal ignores it first, soon, he starts to become jealous of Mohan and suspects if Sunita is having an affair with him. Later, when Mohan throws a party Kamal finds Sunita with Mohan and becomes furious. Kamal questions Sunita and argues with her, Sunita has no idea of whats happening but is disappointed and leaves to her parents house. Sunita's father also comes to try and talk sense into Kamal, but again, he refuses to listen. Sunita's mother is persuading Sunita to go and talk to Kamal. Sunita herself doesn't want to give up on Kamal yet, but her father furiously forbids her to go.

Mohan comes and asks Sunita to tie a rakhi on him to help convince Kamal of their innocence, but her father rebuffs that idea too. He sends a divorce notice to Kamal in an attempt to make Kamal come to them, but Kamal thinks his is a bluff and the divorce goes through. Sunita is heartbroken and is hospitalized. One evening Kamal sees a man jumping the fence between his and Mohan's property. He gives chase, and catches the man who introduces himself as Suresh. Suresh admits that he's having an affair with Mohan's wife, and tells Kamal about Mohan's innocence. Repentant, Kamal asks forgiveness first from Mohan, who gladly grants it. Then he goes to Sunita's house, where he receives shocking news that Sunita's father has gotten Sunita remarried, despite reluctance on her part.

Devastated, Kamal leaves his house and wanders alone. Many years pass by, Kamal becomes an old homeless beggar who lives in the streets. He visits his house (which is now occupied by another family) to revive his memories. There, he is accused of theft and is beaten up. However, Mohan finds him there and reconciles with him. He gives a letter to Kamal from Sunita. She wrote that she was pregnant when she left Kamal and remarried for the sake of her daughter she also expressed a wish that Kamal should come to her daughter's wedding and bless her. Though, hesitant, Mohan convinces him to attend.

Kamal sees the wedding ceremony happen, unfortunately, a fire breaks out in the marriage hall causing a huge ruckus. Kamal saves his daughter who was stuck in the fire and gets mortally injured in the process. Sunita is shocked to see Kamal in this condition and reveals to her daughter that Kamal is her true father. Kamal happily blesses his daughter but dies due to his wounds. The film ends as the wedding turns into a funeral.

== Cast ==
- Rajesh Khanna as Kamal Bhatnagar
- Mumtaz as Sunita Bhatnagar
- Sanjeev Kumar as Mohan
- Rehman as Sunita's Father
- Dina Pathak as Shanti, Sunita's mother
- Jayshree T. as Seema, Sunita's friend
- Ranjeet as Suresh
- A. K. Hangal as Vinay Bhatnagar, Kamal's father
- Brahm Bhardwaj as Bakshi, Kamal's lawyer
- Murad as Rathore, Kamal's employer
- Jr. Mehmood Kalua
- Ruby Sulochana as Girl's Hostel Superintendent Garima
- Asrani as Dr. Ghad-Ghad Singhwala
- Satyendra Kapoor as Dr. Harish
- Sunder as Dhandu Ram
- Keshto Mukherjee as Kanhaiya

== Music ==
- Song "Jai Jai Shiv Shankar" was 'second' topmost song in Binaca Geetmala annual list 1974
- Song "Karvaten badalte rahe" was listed at #17 on Binaca Geetmala annual list 1974

All lyrics are written by Anand Bakshi; all music is composed by Rahul Dev Burman.

Songs
No.	Title	Playback	Length
1.	"Chori Chori Chupke Chupke"	Lata Mangeshkar	4:44
2.	"Jai Jai Shiv Shankar"	Kishore Kumar, Lata Mangeshkar	5:38
3.	"Karwaten Badalte Rahe (Raga Pahadi)"	Kishore Kumar, Lata Mangeshkar	4:56
4.	"Paas Nahin Aana"	Kishore Kumar, Lata Mangeshkar	3:50
5.	"Suno Kaho Kaha Suna"	Kishore Kumar, Lata Mangeshkar	4:20
6.	"Zindagi Ke Safar Mein (Raga Bihag)"	Kishore Kumar	6:39

== Reception ==
The Hindu in its review of the film, quoted: "In a remarkable scene, where Rajesh Khanna, his anger simmering, confronts Mumtaz, the director, J. Om Prakash, brings out the performer in both. Mumtaz brings compelling expressions to her countenance as her initial disbelief at being doubted by her husband is transformed from anguish to fury in a flash. This remains the standout moment of the movie apart from the song "Zindagi Ke Safar Mein Guzar Jate Hain Jo Maqaam". Sampada Sharma in her retrospective review for The Indian Express stated, "The film has a lasting effect, and that is mainly because it does not pander to the idea that life is an endless pool of opportunities. Aap Ki Kasam might not be the most forward-thinking film of its time, but it certainly was one of the most unique mainstream films that came out of this era."
