= Pran filmography =

Performances by Indian actor

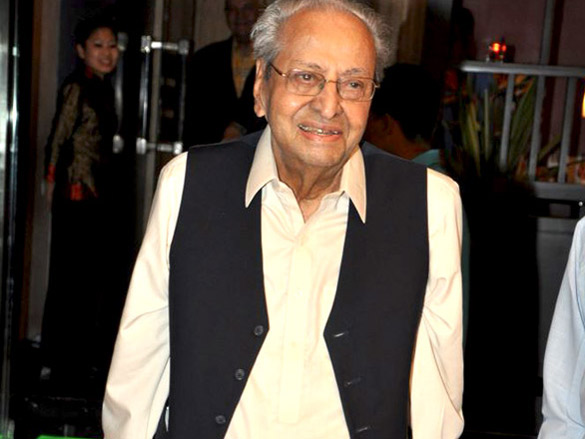
Pran in 2010

This is the filmography for the Indian actor Pran. He acted in more than 362 films.

== Films ==
=== 1940s ===
Year	Film	Role	Notes
1940	Yamla Jat	Kuldeep	Debut role Punjabi film
1941	Chaudhry		Punjabi film
1941	Khazanchi		
1942	Khandaan	Anwar	
1943	Sahara		
1944	Daasi		
1945	Kaise Kahun		
1945	Ragini		
1945	Pardesi Balam		
1946	Badnami		
1946	Khamosh Nigahen		
1946	Paraye Bas Mein		
1946	Rehana		
1947	Arsi		
1947	Mohini		
1947	But Tarash		
1948	Barsat Ki Ek Raat		
1948	Birhan		
1948	Chunaria		
1948	Nek Dil		
1948	Grihasthi		
1949	Ziddi		
1949	Aparadhi	Mohan	
1949	Bari Behen	Ajit alias Jeetu	
1949	Roshani		
1949	Janmapatri		
1949	Rakhi		

=== 1950s ===
Year	Film	Role	Notes
1950	Chhai	Multani	Punjabi film
1950	Biwi		
1950	Putli		
1950	Lajawab		
1950	Sangeeta		
1950	Sheesh Mahal	Sundarmukh	
1951	Afsana	Mohan	
1951	Bahar	Shekhar	
1951	Daman		
1951	Sabz Bagh		
1951	Pyar Ki Baten	Saki	
1952	Chham Chhama Chham		
1952	Sanskar		
1952	Sindbad Jahazi		
1952	Zamane Ki Hawa		
1952	Moti Mahal		
1953	Aah	Dr. Kailash	
1953	Alif Laila		
1953	Ansoo		
1953	Baghi		
1953	Farmaish		
1953	Malkin		
1953	Rahbar		
1954	Biraj Bahu	Deodhar	
1954	Pehli Jhalak	Pran	
1954	Pilpili Saheb		
1954	Sheeshe Ki Diwar		
1954	Angaray	Fullura	
1954	Lakeeren		
1954	Meenar		
1954	Toofan		
1955	Abe-Hayat	Aqeel	
1955	Amanat	Naresh	
1955	Azaad	Sundar	
1955	Bara-Dari	Karan Singh	
1955	Chingari		
1955	Bahu		
1955	Jashan		
1955	Kundan	Gopal	
1955	Munimji	Rattan	
1955	Devdas	One of Chandramukhi's patrons	Cameo
1956	Aan Baan		
1956	Chori Chori	Suman Kumar	
1956	Ham Sab Chor Hain	Deepak	
1956	Hotel		
1956	Halaku	Halaku Khan	
1956	Kar Bhala		
1956	Inspector	Raj Kumar	
1956	Naya Andaz	Ashok	
1956	Tankhah		
1957	Ek Jhalak		
1957	Miss India	Jagadish	
1957	Aasha	Raj	
1957	Champakali		
1957	Tumsa Nahin Dekha	Sohan	
1957	Mr. X		
1958	Chandu		
1958	Adalat	Kedarnath	
1958	Amar Deep	Pran	
1958	Daughter Of Sindbad		
1958	Madhumati	Raja Ugra Narayan	
1958	Raj Tilak		
1958	Chandan		
1959	Bedard Zamana Kya Jaane		
1959	Daaka		
1959	Do Gunde		
1959	Guest House		
1959	Madam X.Y.Z.		
1959	Pyar Ki Rahen		
1959	Jaal Saz		

=== 1960s ===
Year	Film	Role	Notes
1960	Basant	Rajesh	
1960	Bewaqoof	Pran	
1960	Chhalia	Abdul Rahman	
1960	Delhi Junction		
1960	Gambler		
1960	Jis Desh Men Ganga Behti Hai	Raka	
1960	Maa Baap		
1960	Trunk Call		
1961	Jab Pyar Kisi Se Hota Hai	Sohan	
1962	Dil Tera Diwana	Ganpat	
1962	Half Ticket	Raja babu	
1962	Man-Mauji	Jagga	
1962	Jhoola	Dharamraj / Mirza Singapori / Rai Bahadur Shyamlal Bihari	
1963	Bluff Master	Ram Kumar	
1963	Phir Wohi Dil Laya Hoon	Ramesh	
1963	Ek Raaz	Arun	
1963	Mere Armaan, Mere Sapne		
1963	Dil Hi To Hai	Shaikhu / Yusuf	
1963	Pyaar Kiya To Darna Kya	Jeevan	
1963	Mere Mehboob	Munne Raja	
1964	Door Ki Awaz		
1964	Ishaara	Suresh Das	
1964	Kashmir Ki Kali	Mohan	
1964	Pooja Ke Phool	Balam Singh	
1964	Rajkumar	Narpat Singh	
1965	Do Dil	Kunwar Pratap Singh	
1965	Khandan	Navrangi	
1965	Gumnaam	Rakesh	
1965	Mere Sanam	Shyam	
1965	Shaheed	Daku Kehar Singh	
1966	Biradari		
1966	Dus Lakh	Jerry	
1966	Do Badan	Ashwini Kumar	
1966	Dil Diya Dard Liya	Ramesh	
1966	Sawan Ki Ghata	Kailash Chowdhury	
1966	Love in Tokyo	Pran	
1967	An Evening in Paris	Shekhar	
1967	Around The World	Pran	
1967	Patthar Ke Sanam	Lala Bhagatram	
1967	Ram Aur Shyam	Gajendra	
1967	Aurat	Manohar Lal	
1967	Milan	Rajendra	
1967	Upkar	Malang	
1968	Aadmi	Mayadas	
1968	Brahmachari	Ravi Khanna	
1968	Kahin Din Kahin Raat	Pran	
1968	Sadhu Aur Shaitan	Dilawar Singh	
1968	Muskurahat		
1969	Anjaana	Diwan Mahendranath	
1969	Aansoo Ban Gaye Phool	Shambhu Mahadev Rao	
1969	Bhai Bahen		
1969	Madhavi		
1969	Nanha Farishta		
1969	Tumse Achcha Kaun Hai	Pran	
1969	Pyar Hi Pyar	Satish Raj / Ashok	
1969	Sachaai	Prakash	

=== 1970s ===
Year	Film	Role	Notes
1970	Bhai Bhai	Prince Mahendru	
1970	Ganwaar	Vijay Bahadur	
1970	Tum Haseen Main Jawaan	Ranjeet	
1970	Gopi	Lala	
1970	Heer Raanjha	Chhote Chowdhury	
1970	Humjoli	Gopaldas	
1970	Johny Mera Naam	Mohan alias Moti	
1970	Kab? Kyoon? Aur Kahan?	Daljeet Prasad	
1970	Nanak Dukhiya Sab Sansar	Gyani	Punjabi film
1970	Purab Aur Paschim	Harnam	
1970	Samaj Ko Badal Dalo	Daulatram	
1970	Yaadgaar		
1971	Chingari		
1971	Guddi	Himself	
1971	Johar Mehmood in Hong Kong	Pran	
1971	Jawan Mohabbat	Vinod	
1971	Jwala	Kumar	
1971	Lakhon Me Ek	Sher Singh	
1971	Naya Zamana	Rajendranath Chowdhury "Rajan"	
1971	Maryada	Pran Bahadur	
1971	Adhikar	Banne Khan Bhopali	
1971	Parde Ke Peechey	Balwant	
1971	Ganga Tera Pani Amrit	Brijmohan "Birju"	
1972	Aan Baan	Raja Bahadur	
1972	Aankhon Aankhon Mein	Thakur Shiv Prasad	
1972	Be-Imaan	Constable Ram Singh	
1972	Buniyaad		
1972	Ek Bechara	Rai Bahadur Mohan	
1972	Jangal Mein Mangal	Retired Colonel M. K. Das and Raghu	Double role
1972	Parichay	Retired Colonel A. P. Roy	
1972	Roop Tera Mastana	Ajit	
1972	Victoria No. 203	Rana Ramlal Chauhan	
1972	Sazaa	CBI Inspector Verma / Sohanlal	
1972	Yeh Gulistan Hamara	Deng Do Rani	
1973	Zanjeer	Sher Khan	
1973	Bobby	Ram Nath	
1973	Ek Kunwari Ek Kunwara		
1973	Ek Mutthi Asmaan		
1973	Dharma	Sevak Singh / Dharam Singh "Dharma" / Chandan Seth / Nawab Sikandar Mirza	
1973	Jugnu	Shyam	
1973	Gaddaar	B. K.	
1973	Insaaf	Shekhar and Kanhaiya	Double role
1973	Jeewan Rahasya		Bengali film
1973	Joshila	Thakur Rajpal Singh	
1973	Jheel Ke Us Paar	Raseela	
1973	Rickshawala	Kailash	
1973	Paanch Dushman		
1974	Kasauti	Pyarelal	
1974	Jeewan Rekha		
1974	Majboor	Michael D'souza	
1974	Zehreela Insaan	Masterji	
1975	Chori Mera Kaam	ACP Kumar	
1975	Do Jhoot	Chowdhury Pratap Rai	
1975	Lafange	Lal	
1975	Sanyasi	Shanti Baba "Guruji"	
1975	Zinda Dil	Major Hemraj Sharma	
1975	Warrant	IGP Mehra	
1976	Dus Numbri	Havildar turned CBI Karan Singh "Baadshah"	
1976	Khalifa		
1976	Shankar Dada	Inspector Amar Singh	
1977	Amar Akbar Anthony	Kishanlal	
1977	Chandi Sona	Amar	
1977	Chakkar Pe Chakkar	Sher Singh	
1977	Dharam Veer	Jwala Singh	
1977	Hatyara	Daulat Singh	
1977	Chingari		
1978	Chor Ho To Aisa	Prannath	
1978	Chor Ke Ghar Chor	Mangal	
1978	Des Pardes	Sameer Sahni	
1978	Do Musafir	Shambhu Chowdhury	
1978	Rahu Ketu		
1978	Vishwanath	Golu Gawah	
1978	Kaala Aadmi	Dharam Prakash	
1978	Khoon Ki Pukar	Dr. Vidya Bhushan "Pujari"	
1978	Phaansi		
1978	Ganga Ki Saugandh	Kalu Chamar	
1978	Don	Jasjit Ahuja "J. J."	
1979	Atmaram		
1979	Teen Cheharey	3rd betrayer	
1979	Aap Ke Deewane	Thakur Vikramjeet Singh	

=== 1980s ===
Year	Film	Role	Notes
1980	Bombay 405 Miles	Masterji	
1980	Desh Drohi		
1980	Dhan Daulat	Bajirao	
1980	Jwalamukhi	Rai	
1980	Jal Mahal	Devendra Pratap Singh	
1980	Karz	Kabira	
1980	Patthar Se Takkar		
1980	Zalim		
1980	Dostana	Tony	
1981	Khuda Kasam	Ranveer Singh / Girdharilal	
1981	Khoon Ka Rishta	Justice Surendra Sinha	
1981	Krodhi	Acharya	
1981	Waqt Ki Deewar	Sher Khan	
1981	Maan Gaye Ustaad	Chandan Singh	
1981	Naseeb	Naamdev	
1981	Kaalia	Jailor Raghuveer Singh	
1982	Jeeo Aur Jeene Do	Meherbaan Singh	
1982	Taqdeer Ka Badshah	Shankar	
1982	Partner		
1982	Taaqat		
1982	Khush Naseeb		
1982	Jaanwar	Ram Singh	
1983	Daulat Ke Dushman		
1983	Ek Jaan Hain Hum		
1983	Film Hi Film	Gyanchand / Sethji	
1983	Laalach	David	
1983	Naukar Biwi Ka	Abdul	
1983	Souten	Rai Sahib Prannath Pasha	
1983	Woh Jo Hasina	Radheshyam	
1983	Bade Dilwala	Sinha	
1983	Andhaa Kaanoon	Anthony D'Cruz	
1983	Nastik	Balbir	
1984	Farishta		Produced and directed by son Sunil Sikand
1984	Haisiyat	Jagadish	
1984	Jagir	Mangal Singh	
1984	Laila	Bharat Singh	
1984	Mera Faisla	Police commissioner Rana	
1984	Raja Aur Rana		
1984	Raaj Tilak	Arjun Singh	
1984	Sohni Mahiwal	Tulla	
1984	Duniya	Juggal Kishore Ahuja "J. K."	
1984	Sharaabi	Rai Sahib Amarnath Kapoor	
1985	Durgaa	Jagannath	
1985	Hoshiyar	Dhartiraj	
1985	Bewafai	Diwan Sardarilal	
1985	Pataal Bhairavi	Maharaja Vijay Singh	
1985	Maa Kasam		
1985	Sarfarosh	Baba	
1985	Karm Yudh	Charan Singh Deol	
1985	Yudh	Deputy commissioner Saxena	
1986	Tandra Paparayudu	Governor General Marquis de Busy-Castelnau	Telegu film
1986	Dosti Dushmani	Devendra Pratap Singh	
1986	Dilwaala	M. P. Raj Shekhar	
1986	Dharm Adhikari	Chowdhury	
1986	Jeeva	Lala Lalchand	
1986	Love and God	Shahzada Ibn-e-Salaam	
1986	Ricky		
1986	Suhaagan	Jagat Prasad	
1987	Dilruba Tangewali		
1987	Goraa		
1987	Insaaf Kaun Karega	Jagira	
1987	Imaandaar	Sudarshan Rai	
1987	Kudrat Ka Kanoon	Raj Shekhar	
1987	Hifazat	Thakur Satya Prakash	
1987	Muqaddar Ka Faisla	Dhanraj	
1987	Maa Beti	Ramu	
1987	Sitapur Ki Geeta	Dharam Singh "Dharma"	
1988	Dharam Shatru		
1988	Paap Ki Duniya	Jailor Shamsher Singh	
1988	Sherni	Banjara	
1988	Aurat Teri Yehi Kahani	Ghotala	
1988	Dharamyudh		
1988	Gunahon Ka Faisla		
1988	Kasam	Sardar Mangal Singh	
1988	Rama O Rama	John D'Souza	
1988	Mohabbat Ke Dushman	Rustom	
1988	Shahenshah	Inspector Aslam	
1989	Bade Ghar Ki Beti		Special Appearance
1989	Shukriya		
1989	Mitti Aur Sona	Advocate Yashwant Sinha	
1989	Nigahen : Nagina Part II	Raja Sahib	
1989	Jaadugar	Gajendra	
1989	Toofan	Inspector Hanuman Prasad Singh	

=== 1990s ===
Year	Title	Role	Notes
1990	Azaad Desh Ke Gulam	Ashok Bhandari	
1990	Pyar Ka Toofan		
1990	Kodama Simham	Mayor Ranjith	Telugu film
1990	Roti Kee Keemat	Police Inspector / Commissioner R. K. Mathur	
1990	Sanam Bewafa	Fateh Khan	
1991	Lakshmanrekha	Kishan Lal Sharma	Also Co-producer Directed by son Sunil Skiand
1991	Banjaran	Thakur Baba	
1992	Mashooq	Kedarnath	
1992	Panaah	Joseph	
1992	Meera Ka Mohan	Judge Rai Bahadur Devi Prasad	
1992	Isi Ka Naam Zindagi	Bansiram	
1992	Do Hanso Ka Joda		
1992	Bewaffa Se Waffa	Nawab Jamaluddin Khan	
1992	Hosaraaga		Kannada film
1993	Dosti Ki Saugandh		
1993	Chandra Mukhi	Rai (Raja's grandfather)	
1993	Kohra	Kailashnath Rathod/Sir John	
1993	Gurudev	Parasuram	
1993	Aaja Meri Jaan	Brigadier Bhawani Singh Chauhan "Acharyaji"	
1993	Bhagyawan	Dhanraj	
1994	1942: A Love Story	Abid Ali Baig	
1994	Hum Hain Bemisaal	D'Souza	
1995	Saajan Ki Bahon Mein	Narang	
1995	Vaapsi Saajan Ki		
1996	Lalchi		
1996	Tere Mere Sapne	Shambhunath Mehta	
1997	Lakha		
1997	Gudia	Hameed	
1997	Lav Kush	Maharishi Valmiki	
1997	Kaun Rokega Mujhe	Kashinath	
1997	Salma Pe Dil Aa Gaya	Shah	
1997	Mrityudata	Professor Nizamuddin Azad	
1998	Badmaash	Kashinath Hiraskar	
1999	Jai Hind		

=== 2000s ===
Year	Title	Role	Notes
2000	Ek Hi Manzil		
2002	Mohabbat Pehli Nazar Mein		
2002	Suryakant		
2002	Tum Jiyo Hazaron Saal		
2003	Deewana Tere Pyar Ka		
2003	Kiska Dosh		
2003	Ek Hindustani	Shrivastav	Unreleased film
2007	Dosh		
