= 5 Rifles =

1974 Indian Hindi film

- Original poster
- Directed by: I. S. Johar
- Written by: I. S. Johar
- Produced by: I. S. Johar
- Starring: Rakesh Khanna; Shahi Kapoor
- Cinematography: Sadanand
- Edited by: M. S. Shinde
- Music by: Kalyanji-Anandji
- Production companies: Essel Studios; R.K. Studios; Ranjit Studios
- Distributed by: Delux Productions India; Shanti Enterprises
- Release date: 9 August 1974
- Country: India
- Language: Hindi

5 Rifles is a 1974 Hindi film produced and directed by I. S. Johar. The film stars Rajesh Khanna's look-alike Rakesh Khanna, Shashi Kapoor's look-alike Shahi Kapoor, and I. S. Johar. Music was given by Kalyanji Anandji. One particular qawwali of note in this film is the track "Jhoom Barabar Jhoom Sharabi", sung by the notable qawwal singer of his times, Janab Aziz Nazan. Another song "Jab se Sarkar ne Nashabandi Tod Di", sung by Kishore Kumar is also a hit semi-qawwali.

== Cast ==
- Rakesh Khanna (a Rajesh Khanna look-alike) as Prafull Mishra
- Shahi Kapoor (a Shashi Kapoor look-alike) as Dacoit Raka
- Ambika Johar (aka Neelam Johar) as Rajkumari/Khatari
- I. S. Johar as Harfan Mama
- Kamal Kapoor as Police Commissioner
- Veena as Maharani
- Murad as Wajid Saab
- D.K. Sapru as Maharaja (as Sapru)
- Keshto Mukherjee as Drunkard (as Keshto Mukerji)
- Ram Avtar as Constable (fatso)
- Anil Johar as Captain Aslam
- Satyadeep
- Anu (as Master Anu)
- Ketty Irani

== Songs ==
1. "Jhum Baraabar Jhum Sharaabi" - Aziz Nazan
2. "Duniya Ke Banane Wale Ne" - Kishore Kumar
3. "Teraa Husn Allah Allah Teraa Rup Ram Ram" - Kishore Kumar
4. "Jab Se Sarakar Ne Nashabandee Tod Dee" - Kishore Kumar
5. "Malmal Me Badan Mora Chamke" - Asha Bhosle
6. "Pyar Ke Patang Ki Dor Jiske Hath Hai" - Kishore Kumar
