= Khalifa (film) =

- Directed by: Prakash Mehra
- Written by: Nabendu Ghosh (screenplay); Anand Romani (dialogue)
- Produced by: Jeetendra Luthra
- Starring: Randhir Kapoor; Rekha; Pran; I. S. Johar; Madan Puri; Lalita Pawar
- Cinematography: Baldev Singh
- Edited by: Pran Mehra
- Music by: R.D. Burman; Gulshan Bawra (lyrics)
- Release date: 1976
- Running time: 137 mins
- Country: India
- Language: Hindi

Khalifa is a 1976 Hindi film, produced by Jeetendra Luthra and directed by Prakash Mehra. The film stars Randhir Kapoor, Rekha, Pran, I. S. Johar, Madan Puri and Lalita Pawar.

== Plot ==
Rajendra is a conman. He promises marriage to his girlfriend Kamla after finding out about her pregnancy. However, he leaves her, taking away all her savings which leads to Kamla to committing suicide. Kamla's brother Vikram decides to take revenge by killing Rajendra. Meanwhile, Vinod, who is a man of good character, now encounters his look-alike Rajendra, which puts Vinod's life a complicated situation. Eventually, all confusion is resolved and the movie leads to a happy ending.

== Cast ==
- Randhir Kapoor as Vinod / Rajendra
- Rekha as Rekha
- Pran as Vikram
- I. S. Johar as Diwan Manoharlal Agnihotri
- Madan Puri as Dharamdas Sharma
- Lalita Pawar as Ganga Devi
- Sonia Sahni as Sweety
- Urmila Bhatt as Shanta D. Sharma
- Praveen Paul as Mrs. Agnihotri
- Jankidas as Harihar
- Arpana Choudhary as Kamla

== Soundtrack ==
- "Dekh Tujhko Dil Ne Kaha" (Part 1) - Kishore Kumar, Asha Bhosle
- "Dekh Tujhko Dil Ne Kaha" (Part 2) - Instrumental
- "Dil Machal Raha Hai" - Kishore Kumar, Asha Bhosle
- "Tak Dhin Tak" (Part 1) - Kishore Kumar, Manna Dey
- "Tak Dhin Tak" (Part 2) - Kishore Kumar, Manna Dey
- "Meri Arz Suno Banwari" - Manna Dey
- "Dil Machal Raha Hai" - Instrumental
