= M. N. Malhotra =

Indian cinematographer

MN Malhotra
- Occupations: Cinematographer, Chief technician

M. N. Malhotra was an Indian cinematographer best known for his work on Hamraaz (1967), Naya Daur (1957), and Qaidi (1940). For Hamraaz, he won the national award for best cinematography in 1967.

Along with Y. D. Sarpotdar, Malhotra assisted Ernst Haller, the director of photography, on Jhansi Ki Rani, India's first technicolor movie. It was the most expensive Hindi film until that time.

He worked with directors including B.R. Chopra, Sohrab Modi, Narendra Suri, and C.L. Rawal. He was active primarily from the 1940s through the late 1960s.

== Personal ==
MN Malhotra is the father of Bollywood producer Naresh Malhotra and grandfather of Namit Malhotra, Indian film and television producer and a business executive.

== Filmography ==
- Jhansi Ki Rani (1953)
- Sheesh Mahal (1950)
- Kundan (1955)
- Ek Hi Raasta (1956)
- Naya Daur (1957)
- Sadhana (1958)
- Lajwanti (1958)
- Dhool Ka Phool (1959)
- Kanoon (1960)
- Dharmputra (1961)
- Gumrah (1963)
- Waqt (1965)
- Humraaz (1967)
- Aabroo (1968)
