= Sonia Sahni =

Indian film actress

- Occupation: Actress
- Years active: 1965–1999
- Spouses: Shivendra Singh Goyal (died 1990): I. S. Johar
- Children: 1

Sonia Sahni is an Indian actress who worked in Hindi language films. Her debut film was Johar-Mehmood in Goa with actors I. S. Johar and Mehmood. Her other notable films are Maalik (1972 film), Buddha Mil Gaya, Bobby, Dharam Karam, Chacha Bhatija and Jangal Mein Mangal.

== Early life ==
Sahni was born as Usha Sahni in a Punjabi Sikh family that migrated from Lahore to Kashmir after partition in 1947. Her family embraced Christianity after migrating; and Usha was renamed as Sonia.

== Career ==
Producer-director Roop Shourie and I. S. Johar cast Sonia in Johar-Mehmood in Goa, which was successful. Sahni signed a five-year contract with I. S. Johar. She worked with Kishore Kumar, Mehmood, Sanjeev Kumar, Dev Kumar, Sujit Kumar, etc. during that period. She could also act opposite heroes like Dharmendra, Raj Kapoor, Raaj Kumar, Dev Anand etc. In the 1973 film Bobby, she acted as Mrs. Sushma Nath, mother of Rishi Kapoor. Later she acted as the second lead in many films of popular heroines such as Hema Malini, Waheeda Rehman, Parveen Babi, Zeenat Aman, and Rekha.

== Personal life ==
For a brief period, Sahni was engaged to actor Shammi Kapoor after his wife's death.

She converted to Hinduism and married Shivendra Singh Gohil (died 1990), the former king of Palitana state. They have a son named Ketan.

== Filmography ==
- Johar-Mehmood in Goa (1965) as Rita
- Maya (1966) as Sheela
- Johar in Kashmir (1966) as Salma Mohammed Hussein
- Akalmand (1966)
- Johar in Bombay (1967) as Nalini
- Mera Naam Johar (1968)
- Raat Ke Andhere Mein (1969)
- Bandish (1969)
- Dupatta (1970) as Punjabi language film
- Sasta Khoon Mehnga Pyar (1970)
- Kaun Ho Tum (1970)
- Heer Raanjha (1970) as (Guest Appearance)
- Sharafat (1970) as Rekha
- Darpan (1970) as Bijli
- Upaasna (1971)
- Johar Mehmood in Hong Kong (1971) as Ms. Sonia / Usha Roy
- Hulchul (1971) as Seema
- Buddha Mil Gaya (1971) as Mona
- Andaz (1971) as Lily
- Bhaavna (1972)
- Jangal Mein Mangal (1972) as Professor Laxmi
- Maalik (1972 film) (1972) as Narangi
- Jugnu (1973) as Sonia
- Bobby (1973) as Mrs. Sushma Nath
- Wahi Raat Wahi Aawaz (1973)
- Dharma (1973)
- Kasauti (1974) as Nita
- 36 Ghante (1974) as Kamini
- Dharam Karam (1975) as Sonu A. Kumar
- Neelima (1975)
- Maha Chor (1976) as Parmeshwari
- Khalifa (1976) as Sweety
- Change Mande Tere Bande (1976)
- Shankar Dada (1976) as Queen
- Bullet (1976) as Mala
- Aap Ki Khatir (1977)
- Niyaz Aur Namaaz (1977)
- Chalta Purza (1977) as Nurse
- Chacha Bhatija (1977) as Sonia
- Kaala Aadmi (1978)
- Dera Aashqan Da (1979)
- Aulea-E-Islam (1979)
- Ladke Baap Se Badke (1979) as Mrs. Sharma
- Shradhanjali (1981) as Rani
- Be-Shaque (1981) as Nirmala
- Maan Gaye Ustaad (1981) as Malti C. Singh
- Chorni (1982) as Mrs. Sheela Sagar
- Jawalaa Dahej Ki (1982)
- Bandhan Kuchchey Dhaagon Ka (1983) as Sneh's Nurse
- Lal Chunariyaa (1983)
- Do Gulab (1983)
- Meri Adalat (1984)
- Ganga Ki Beti (1985)
- Sitamgar (1985) as Mrs. Nath
- Zulm Ka Badla (1985)
- Superman (1987 film) (1987) as Editor
- Lakhpati (1991) as Mrs. Nath
- Raunaq (1993) as Mrs. Bakshi
- Aflatoon (1997) as professor
- Anari No. 1 (1999) as Mrs. Malhotra
- Phool Aur Aag (1999)
- Love in Bombay (2013)

== Television ==
- 2001-2002 Jannat
- 2002-2003 Kkusum as Nanima
- 2015-2017 Santoshi Maa as Dadi
