= The Mystery of the Indian Temple =

1963 film

- Directed by: Mario Camerini
- Written by: Leonardo Benvenuti; Piero De Bernardi; Guy Elmes; Robert Westerby
- Produced by: Roberto Dandi; René Bonef
- Starring: Paul Guers; Senta Berger; Lex Barker; Claudine Auger
- Cinematography: Aldo Tonti
- Edited by: Giuliana Attenni
- Music by: Angelo Francesco Lavagnino
- Production companies: Critérion Film; Eichberg-Film; Serena Film
- Distributed by: Cineriz; Rank Film; Interfilm
- Release date: 21 November 1963
- Running time: 98 minutes
- Countries: France; Italy; West Germany
- Language: Italian

The Mystery of the Indian Temple (Italian: Il mistero del tempio indiano, French: Le mystère du temple hindou) is a 1963 technicolor historical adventure film directed by Mario Camerini and starring Paul Guers, Senta Berger, Lex Barker and Claudine Auger. It is a co-production between France, Italy and West Germany. It is a sequel to the film Kali Yug: Goddess of Vengeance. Location shooting took place in India. The film's sets and costumes were designed by the art director Maurizio Chiari.

== Cast ==
- Paul Guers as Dr. Simon Palmer
- Senta Berger as Catherine Talbot
- Lex Barker as Maj. Ford
- Claudine Auger as Amrita
- Joachim Hansen as Lt. Collins
- Sergio Fantoni as Ram Chand
- Ian Hunter as Robert Talbot
- Klaus Kinski as Saddhu
- I. S. Johar as Gopal
- Michael Medwin as Capt. Walsh
- Roldano Lupi as Maharadscha
- Alfio Caltabiano as The Crie
- Luciano Conversi as Kanchan

== Bibliography ==
- Bock, Hans-Michael & Bergfelder, Tim. The Concise Cinegraph: Encyclopaedia of German Cinema. Berghahn Books, 2009.
