= Nanak Nam Jahaz Hai =

1969 film

Nanak Naam Jahaz Hai
- Directed by: Ram Maheshwari
- Written by: Ram Maheshwari
- Story by: Bekal Amritsari
- Produced by: Pannalal Maheshwari
- Starring: Prithviraj Kapoor; I. S. Johar; Vimi; Nishi Kohli; Veena; Jagdish Raj; Som Dutt; David Abraham; Ramayan Tiwari; Suresh
- Cinematography: D. K. Prabhakar
- Edited by: D. N. Pai
- Music by: S. Mohinder
- Production company: kalpanalok
- Distributed by: Shemaroo Entertainment Pvt. Ltd; Famous Cine Studios Pvt. Ltd, Tardeo, Mumbai
- Release date: 15 April 1969 (India)
- Running time: 133 minutes
- Country: India
- Language: Punjabi

Nanak Naam Jahaz Hai is a 1969 Punjabi film directed by Ram Maheshwary, starring Prithviraj Kapoor, I. S. Johar, Vimi, Nishi and Veena.

The film is based on a true incident which took place at Golden Temple, Amritsar. The film was awarded the 1970 National Film Award for Best Feature Film in Punjabi, and National Film Award for Best Music Direction,

== Plot ==
The film is set in Amritsar in 1947. A devout Sikh and prosperous contracting businessman, Gurmukh Singh (Prithviraj Kapoor), lives with his wife, and younger brother, Prem. Trouble starts when Prem marries Ratan Kaur, as her brother, Sukha, creates differences between two brothers, which eventually leads to the closure of the business. However, amidst all the difficult times that come, Gurmukh never loses faith and in time, because of his sacrifice and quiet suffering, harmony is established in the family in the end.

== Cast ==
Actor/Actress	Role
Prithviraj Kapoor	Gurmukh Singh
I. S. Johar	Sukha, Ratan Kaur's brother
Vimi	Charanjit Kaur aka Channi
Nishi	Ratan Kaur
Veena	Gurmukh Singh's wife
Jagdish Raj	Inspector
Som Dutt	Gurmeet Singh
David Abraham	Doctor
Ramayan Tiwari	Doctor
Suresh	Prem Singh

== Soundtrack ==
S. Mohinder composed the music and Verma Malik penned the lyrics while many of the lyrical compositions are taken from the Gurbani (from the Sikh religious text, Guru Granth Sahib).

Shabad "Re Mann Aiso Karr" and also earned him a 1970 National Film Award for Best Music Direction

Song	Singer
Bul Tere Ne Chandigarh De	Asha Bhosle, Mohammad Rafi
Guran Ik Deh Bujhai	Manna Dey
Prabh Jo Tokhe Laaj Hamari	Asha Bhosle, Mahendra Kapoor
Kal Taran Guru Nanak Aaya	Bhai Samund Singh Raagi
Deh Shiva Bar Mohe	Mahendra Kapoor
Bissar Gayi Sab Tat Parayi	Manna Dey
Mittar Pyare Nu Haal	Mohammad Rafi
Hum Maile Tum Ujjal Karte	Manna Dey
Mere Sahiba Mere Sahib	Asha Bhosle
Re Man Aiso Kar Sanyasa	Asha Bhosle
Mitti Dundh Jag Chanan Hoya	Bhai Samund Singh Raagi
Lavan (Har Chouthari Lanv)	S. Mohinder and Bhushan Mehta
Haada Ni Haada Haneir Pai Gaya	Shamshad Begum

.

== Restoration and re-release ==
While the original film was released on 15 April 1969, on the 500th birth anniversary (Guru Nanak Gurpurab) of Sikh Guru Guru Nanak, a digitally-enhanced version is set for release on 27 November 2015, presented by Shemaroo Entertainment and Wave Cinemas.The film is also dubbed in several regional languages, and the first teaser will be unveiled in Mumbai on 17 November at Kapoor family function. Earlier in the months, the film's trailer was launched at the historic Gurdwara Rakab Ganj Sahib in Delhi.
