= Krodhi =

- Theatrical release poster
- Directed by: Subhash Ghai
- Screenplay by: Nabendu Ghosh
- Dialogues by: Subhash Ghai
- Story by: Subhash Ghai
- Produced by: Ranjit Virk
- Starring: Dharmendra; Shashi Kapoor; Zeenat Aman; Hema Malini (special appearance); Moushumi Chatterjee (guest appearance); Premnath; Ranjeeta; Sachin; Pran; Amrish Puri; Vimi
- Cinematography: Kamalakar Rao
- Edited by: Waman Bhonsle; Gurudutt Shirali
- Music by: Score: Kalyanji–Anandji; Songs: Laxmikant–Pyarelal
- Production company: Ranjit Films
- Distributed by: Ranjit Films
- Release date: 20 February 1981
- Running time: 157 minutes
- Country: India
- Language: Hindi

Krodhi (transl. The furious) is a 1981 Indian Hindi-language action thriller film directed by Subhash Ghai. It stars Dharmendra in titular role, Shashi Kapoor and Zeenat Aman, along with Premnath, Ranjeeta, Sachin, Hema Malini (special appearance), Moushumi Chatterjee (guest appearance), Pran, Amrish Puri and Vimi. The film was launched in 1977, but faced delays due to various issues between the cast and the crew, finally released on 20 February 1981.

== Summary ==
Krodhi is the story of Vikramjit Singh alias Vicky, who as an orphan grew up amidst hatred and poverty. When a local school teacher, Shakarbaba, brings him into his school, Vicky becomes friendly with a young girl named Aarti. They later fall in love and Vicky goes abroad to study. On the day Vicky decides to propose marriage, Aarti is sold by her lecherous uncle, for a few thousand rupees, to a group of men who attempt to rape her, but she kills herself.

An enraged Vicky hunts down her uncle and the molesters and kills them by throwing them from a high-rise building. Vicky's rage makes him Krodhi (resentful person) and prompts him to do more daredevil deeds and he ends up becoming the ultimate underworld don with a private militia of his own. When one of his associates, Neera, marries a CBI Officer Kumar Sahni things take a different turn. Police try to nab Vicky and believe him to be dead when his bullet-proof helicopter crashes.

Years later, Neera visits her in-laws in a small town, and is introduced to a kind and saintly person with special powers for healing and is shocked to find that Shradhanand is none other than Vicky. Now Vicky will have to decide whether to run again, or kill this only witness and continue living without any trouble.

== Cast ==
- Dharmendra as Vikramjeet "Vicky" Singh / "Krodhi" / Acharya Shraddhanand
- Shashi Kapoor as CBI Officer Kumar Sahni
- Zeenat Aman as Neera Sahni
- Hema Malini (special appearance) as Phoolmati
- Moushumi Chatterjee (guest appearance) as Aarti
- Premnath as Jagira / South India's "Vikramjeet Singh"
- Pran as Acharya
- Ranjeeta as Guddi
- Amrish Puri as Madhavan
- Vimi as Madhavan's mistress
- Sachin as Raja
- Bharat Bhushan as Muktanand
- Krishan Dhawan as Jagannath
- A. K. Hangal as Mr. Sahni
- Sulochana Latkar as Mrs. Sahni
- Iftekhar as Police Commissioner
- Jagdish Raj as Police Inspector
- Sudhir Dalvi as Shankar Baba
- Sudhir as Dilawar
- Mac Mohan as Mac
- Raj Mehra as Benjamin
- Sajjan as Dr. David
- Surendra Pal as Victor
- Asit Sen as Daroga Sharma
- P. Jairaj as Denanath
- Birbal as Chamcham
- Brahmachari as Panwala
- Raju Shrestha as Krishna
- D. K. Sapru as Zamindar
- C. S. Dubey as Aarti's Uncle

== Soundtrack ==
The background score of the movie was done by Kalyanji–Anandji. The music for the film’s songs was composed by Laxmikant–Pyarelal and the lyrics of the songs were penned by Anand Bakshi.

Song	Singer
"Ladki Tumhari Kunwari Reh Jaati, Mano Hamara Ehsaan"	Kishore Kumar, Asha Bhosle
"Krodh Lobh Maya"	Manna Dey
"Woh Maseeha Aaya Hai"	Lata Mangeshkar
"Chal Chameli Bagh Mein Mewa Khilaoonga"	Lata Mangeshkar, Suresh Wadkar
"Phoolmati Ka Gajra"	Asha Bhosle
