= Farishta (1984 film) =

- Directed by: Sunil Sikand
- Produced by: Sunil Sikand
- Starring: Smita Patil; Kanwaljit; Bharat Bhushan; Pran; Danny Denzongpa; Ashok Kumar
- Cinematography: V. Durga Prasad
- Edited by: David Dhawan
- Music by: R.D.Burman
- Release date: 23 March 1984
- Country: India
- Language: Hindi

Farishta is a 1984 Indian Hindi-language film directed & produced by Sunil Sikand. The film stars Bharat Bhushan, Pran, Danny Denzongpa and Ashok Kumar in pivotal roles. R.D.Burman composed the music for the film.

== Cast ==
- Kanwaljit
- Smita Patil
- Pran
- Ashok Kumar
- Bharat Bhushan
- Danny Denzongpa

== Soundtrack ==
The music of the film was composed by R.D. Burman, while lyrics were written by Anand Bakshi.

1. "Zamane Mein Koi Hamara Nahin" - Kishore Kumar
