= Aabroo (1968 film) =

1968 Indian Hindi film

- Directed by: C. L. Rawal
- Written by: G. L. Rawal
- Produced by: B. L. Rawal
- Starring: Ashok Kumar; Nirupa Roy; Rehman; Leela Naidu; Vimi; Deepak Kumar
- Cinematography: M. N. Malhotra
- Edited by: Pran Mehra
- Music by: Sonik Omi
- Production company: Rawal Films
- Release date: 13 December 1968
- Running time: 170 minutes
- Country: India
- Language: Hindi

Aabroo (Honour) is a 1968 Hindi romantic crime drama film directed by C. L. Rawal. The story, screenplay and dialogue were written by G. L. Rawal. It was produced by B. L. Rawal under the Rawal Films banner. The music directors were Sonik-Omi and the lyricist was G. L. Rawal. The director of photography was M. N. Malhotra. The film starred Ashok Kumar, Nirupa Roy, Vimi, Rehman, Leela Naidu, Shashikala and Deepak Kumar.

The story revolves around two lovers, Manish and Neena, who are separated when Neena is forced to marry her sister's husband. The husband is killed and Manish is arrested for his murder.

== Plot ==
Manish lives with his brother Anand an advocate and sister-in-law Tilottama, in Kashmir. Manish has just returned from abroad having completed his medical degree. Neena has come to Kashmir for her holidays, meets Manish and they fall in love. Manish is waiting to get a job confirmation from one of the hospitals in Bombay. Neena's sister Sharda lives with her husband Chandrashekhar Verma in Bombay. The two are very much in love with each other. Being childless, Sharda is harassed by her mother-in-law Mrs. Verma. Sharda asks Shekhar to get married again, but he refuses. Mrs. Verma's harassment of Sharda turns to tragedy when two relatives Darwajalal and Shanta come to live with them. Neena is also staying in the house with her sister. Darwazalal poisons Sharda, who while dying makes Neena promise that she will marry Chandrashekhar. After Sharda dies, Neena and a distraught Chandrashekhar get married. Chandrashekhar has no interest in Neena as he is still grieving the loss of his beloved wife Sharda.

Manish finally gets a job in Bombay and Anand asks him to stay with his good friend Chandrashekhar till he settles in. On arriving at Chandrashekhar's house, Manish is shocked to find the girl he loves, Neena, now married to Chandrashekhar. Darwajalal and Shanta start rumours regarding Manish and Neena, however, Chandrashekhar overhears Darwajalal's plotting, but is hit on the head by him. His situation is critical and the attending doctor is Manish. When Chandrashekhar dies, Manish is arrested for murder. After a court scene where Anand fights for the prosecution and his wife Tillottama defends Manish, the nefarious planning of Darwajalal and Shanta is revealed.

== Cast ==
- Ashok Kumar as Advocate Anand
- Nirupa Roy as Tilottama
- Rehman as Chandrashekhar Verma
- Leela Naidu as Sharda Verma
- Deepak Kumar as Dr. Manish
- Vimi as Neena
- Jeevan as Darwajalal
- Shashikala as Shanta
- Lalita Pawar as Mrs. Verma
- Tun Tun as Whisky Rani
- Sunder as Whisky Rani's Husband
- Mukri as Munim Barimal Khatamal
- Niranjan Sharma as Judge
- Praveen Paul as Neena's Grandmother

== Soundtrack ==
The music was composed by the duo Sonik-Omi while the lyricist was G. L. Rawal. The playback singers were Asha Bhosle, Mohammed Rafi, Mukesh and Manna Dey.

=== Song list ===
Song	Singer	Raga
"Jinhe Hum"	Mukesh	Bhairavi (Hindustani)
"Meri Aankhon Ke Ujale"	Mohammed Rafi	
"Har Chehra Yahan"	Mohammed Rafi	
"Yeh Dil Nahin Ki"	Mohammed Rafi	
"Aap Se Pyar Hua"	Mohammed Rafi	
"Aap Se Pyar Hua"	Asha Bhosle	
"Aaj Mere Ghar"	Asha Bhosle, Manna Dey	
