= Daulat Ke Dushman =

1983 film

- Movie Poster
- Directed by: Bimal Rawal
- Written by: BalKishan Mauj (Story, Screenplay & Dialogue)
- Produced by: Manu Narang
- Starring: Shatrughan Sinha; Vinod Khanna; Manjushree; Ajit; Pran
- Edited by: H. B. Pathare
- Music by: R. D. Burman
- Release date: 15 February 1983
- Running time: 122 mins
- Country: India
- Language: Hindi

Daulat Ke Dushman is an Indian Hindi movie directed by Bimal Rawal and produced by Manu Narang. The movie was released on 15 February 1983. The film stars Vinod Khanna, Shatrughan Sinha, Ajit, Pran and Manjushree. This film was actually named Paanch Dushman and set to release in 1973, but for some unknown reasons, it was finally released in 1983 with the name Daulat Ke Dushman.

== Cast ==
- Vinod Khanna as Vinod
- Shatrughan Sinha as Shukla R.R.
- Ajit
- Pran
- Prem Chopra
- Manjushree
- Helen
- Aruna Irani
- Bindu
- Mehmood
- Paintal
- Agha
- Jagdish Raj
- Mohan Choti
- Nasir Hussain
- Manmohan
- Mukri
- Brahmachari
- Sunder
- Manu Narang
- Rajee

== Music ==
Lyrics: Majrooh Sultanpuri

- "Jeena Toh Hai, Par Ai Dil Kahan" – Kishore Kumar
- "Jana Hain Hume Toh Jahan Karar Mile" – Kishore Kumar, Lata Mangeshkar
- "Bichuva Bane Piya Tere Nain" – Asha Bhosle
- "Hum Toh Hain Sabke Yaar" – Kishore Kumar, Asha Bhosle
- "Jo Bhi Hua Hai Woh Pyar Me Hua hai" – Kishore Kumar
- "Samjha Me Kismat Khul Gaye" – Mohammed Rafi
