= Paul Guers =

French actor (1927–2016)

- Born: 19 December 1927; Tours, France
- Died: 27 November 2016 (aged 88); Montsoreau, France
- Occupation: Actor
- Years active: 1955-1996

Paul Guers (19 December 1927 – 27 November 2016) was a French film actor. He appeared in 70 films between 1955 and 1996. He starred in the 1963 film Kali Yug: Goddess of Vengeance. He was born in Tours, France and died in Montsoreau.

== Selected filmography ==
- Les chiffonniers d'Emmaüs (1955) - André
- Tower of Lust (1955) - Gaultier d'Aulnay
- Sophie and the Crime (1955) - Claude Broux
- If Paris Were Told to Us (1956) - Le comte de Villars (uncredited)
- The Twilight Girls (1957) - Gilles Mareuil
- Les violents (1957) - Philippe de Coppet
- Fumée blonde (1957) - David Baker
- A Tale of Two Cities (1958) - Charles Darnay
- Toto in Paris (1958) - Pierre, figlio di Duclos
- Marie-Octobre (1959) - Père Yves Le Guen
- I Spit on Your Grave (1959) - Stan Walker
- Die schöne Lügnerin (1959) - French Ambassador D'Aurignac
- L'eau a la bouche (1960) - Jean-Paul Brett-Juval
- Sergeant X (1960) - Henri Mangin
- Une gueule comme la mienne (1960) - Paul Roy
- The Nabob Affair (1960) - Serge
- The Sahara Is Burning (1961) - Lucas Rimbaud
- Fuga desesperada (1961)
- Mourir d'amour (1961) - Michel Frank
- The Girl with the Golden Eyes (1961) - Henri Marsay
- Tales of Paris (1962) - Michel (segment "Françoise")
- Le Crime ne paie pas (1962) - Le docteur Mathieu (segment "L'affaire Fenayrou")
- Homage at Siesta Time (1962) - Henri Balmant
- Bay of Angels (1963) - Caron
- The Reunion (1963) - Livio
- Kali Yug: Goddess of Vengeance (1963) - Dr. Simon Palmer
- The Mystery of the Indian Temple (1963) - Dr. Simon Palmer
- Le bluffeur (1964) - Frédo
- The Magnificent Cuckold (1964) - Gabriele
- Amore mio (1964) - Mario
- La fuga (1965) - Andrea Fabbri
- Hot Frustrations (1965) - Jean
- The Curse of Belphegor (1967) - Fred Daxo
- Un épais manteau de sang (1967) - Dyonis
- Flash Love (1968) - Alain
- Delphine (1969) - Norman
- Une femme libre (1971)
- Le feu aux lèvres (1973) - Michel Benoît
- Pourvu qu'on ait l'ivresse (1974) - Desgenais
- Les noces de porcelaine (1975) - Michel
- Vortex (1976)
- Libertés sexuelles (1977) - Alain
- The Maids of Wilko (1979) - Jola's Husband
- La mer couleur de larmes (1980) - Alain Vidal
- Notre histoire (1984) - Clark
- Three Seats for the 26th (1986) - Max Leehman
- Le parfum d'Yvonne (1994) - Daniel Hendrickx
- L'affaire (1994) - René Lantier
- Joséphine, ange gardien (1998, TV Series) - Pierre
