= Hamraaz =

1967 film by Baldev Raj Chopra

- Film Poster
- Directed by: B. R. Chopra
- Written by: B. R. Chopra (screenplay); C. J. Pavri (story); Akhtar-Ul-Iman (dialogue)
- Produced by: B. R. Chopra
- Starring: Raaj Kumar; Sunil Dutt; Vimi; Mumtaz
- Cinematography: M. N. Malhotra
- Edited by: Pran Mehra
- Music by: Ravi
- Distributed by: B. R. Films
- Release date: 29 December 1967
- Running time: 172 min
- Country: India
- Language: Hindi

Hamraaz (transl. Confidant) is a 1967 Indian Bollywood suspense thriller film, produced and directed by B. R. Chopra and written by Akhtar-Ul-Iman. It stars Raaj Kumar, Sunil Dutt, Vimi, Mumtaz in lead roles, with Balraj Sahni, Madan Puri, Jeevan, Iftekhar, Sarika in other important roles. The film's music is by Ravi, while the lyrics were penned by Sahir Ludhianvi. The film won the National Film Award for Best Feature Film in Hindi.

== Plot ==
Meena, the only daughter of a wealthy military contractor Verma, meets military man Rajesh, falls in love with him and marries him in secret. Almost immediately Rajesh has to go to war. Meena gives birth to a baby girl thereafter but she is told that the baby is stillborn.

Kumar is a well-known stage actor in Mumbai, who performs plays along with Shabhnam. While on a trip to scenic Darjeeling, he falls in love with Meena. They get married and return to Mumbai. Four years later, Meena's dad passes away after telling her the truth about her daughter and giving her some papers as proof. Meena visits the orphanage and brings home her daughter, whom she wants to adopt, but does not tell him the identify of the girl. Kumar refuses this and Meena is forced to send the girl (Sarika) back to the orphanage.

During a Christmas party in Mumbai, Meena meets Mahender (Rajesh's friend) who starts blackmailing Meena about the letters that she had written to Rajesh. He wants her to visit him in his hotel. Kumar notices that Meena excuses herself from accompanying him on some pretext or the other. He finds other clues that suggest that arouse his suspicion. Making the excuse of going to Pune, Kumar checks into a hotel using a false name and false beard. When he returns home that night, he finds the door open, and hears a gunshot. Kumar runs into the room and finds Meena dead, shot in her chest. He decides to call the police station, but realizes that he will be implicated in the murder – his fingerprints are on the gun, he is in disguise, and he is next to the body. Kumar returns to the hotel instead.

The case is assigned to Inspector Ashok, and the next day, when Kumar "returns" to Mumbai, Ashok observes that Kumar knows which room the body is in, without being told. More clues surface, all pointing at Kumar as the killer. Kumar decides to run away from the growing suspicion but his friend, lawyer Jagmohan, discourages him from doing so. Kumar searches Meena's room and finds a key with a hotel room number. Kumar visits the room as a last attempt to clear things and meets Captain Rajesh there. Rajesh tells Kumar that he is Meena's first husband, who managed to survive the war and that their daughter Sarika has seen the murderer as she was playing with her mother when it happened and their activity was being recorded by a video camera. Together, they trace Sarika to Ooty.

Unknown to them, Inspector Ashok is on their trail. He gets them both arrested with the help of the Ooty Police. Rajesh and Kumar explain the case, and locate Sarika, who is at the house of a man named Tejpal. Shabnam and Jagmohan arrive with the videotape as proof of the murder and it is revealed that Tejpal is the killer. Tejpal pulls a gun and threatens to kill Sarika should any of them try to stop him. Captain Rajesh manages to save Sarika but is shot. Ashok shoots Tejpal.

== Cast ==
- Raaj Kumar as Captain Rajesh
- Sunil Dutt as Kumar
- Vimi as Meena
- Balraj Sahni as Inspector Ashok
- Mumtaz as Shabnam
- Sarika as Sarika
- Iftekhar as Advocate Jagmohan
- Anwar Hussain as Captain Mahendra
- Madan Puri as Tejpal
- Urmila Bhatt as Mrs. Tejpal
- Jeevan as Thakur
- Manmohan Krishna as Major Verma
- Achala Sachdev as Matron Parvati
- Nana Palsikar as Coconut Seller Chamanlal
- Nazir Kashmiri as Doctor Shyam
- Helen as Dancer Monica

== Soundtrack ==
Hamraaz

Soundtrack album
- Genre: Feature film soundtrack

The music was composed by Ravi, and the lyrics were penned by Sahir Ludhianvi. Mahendra Kapoor won the Filmfare Award for Best Playback Singer for the song "Neele Gagan Ke Tale".

Song	Singer	Raga
"Neele Gagan Ke Tale"	Mahendra Kapoor	Bhoopali
"Na Munh Chhupake Jeeo"	Mahendra Kapoor	
"Tum Agar Saath Dene Ka"	Mahendra Kapoor	
"Kisi Patthar Ki Murat Se"	Mahendra Kapoor	
"Tu Husn Hai, Main Ishq Hoon, Tu Mujh Mein Hai, Main Tujh Mein Hoon"	Mahendra Kapoor, Asha Bhosle	

== Awards ==
- 1968 Filmfare Best Male Playback Award for Mahendra Kapoor for the song "Neele Gagan Ke Tale"
- 1968 National Film Award for Best Cinematography for M. N. Malhotra
- 1968 Filmfare Best Cinematographer Award for M. N. Malhotra
