= Shrimanji =

- Directed by: Ram Dayal Sabharwal
- Starring: Kishore Kumar; I. S. Johar
- Music by: O. P. Nayyar
- Release date: 1968
- Country: India
- Language: Hindi

Shrimanji is a 1968 Indian Hindi-language comedy film directed by Ram Dayal Sabharwal and starring Kishore Kumar and I. S. Johar. It centres on the transformation of Johar's tradition-loving character into a Westernized man, brought about by Kumar's character in a humorous manner. The film's soundtrack was composed by O. P. Nayyar.

Shrimanji was released during the latter phase of Kumar's career as a leading man. It was a commercial failure.

== Cast ==
- Kishore Kumar
- I. S. Johar
- Shahida
- Meena Roy
- Murad
- Hiralal
- Wasti
- Asit Sen
- Asha Nadkarni
