= Anyone Can Play =

1967 film

- Film poster
- Directed by: Luigi Zampa
- Written by: Ruggero Maccari; Ettore Scola; Stefano Strucchi
- Produced by: Gianni Hecht Lucari; Fausto Saraceni; Luigi Zampa
- Starring: Ursula Andress
- Cinematography: Ennio Guarnieri
- Edited by: Nino Baragli
- Music by: Armando Trovajoli
- Production company: Documento Film
- Distributed by: Paramount Pictures
- Release date: 1967
- Running time: 116 minutes
- Country: Italy
- Language: Italian

Anyone Can Play (Italian: Le dolci signore) is a 1967 Italian comedy film directed by Luigi Zampa and starring two Bond girls Ursula Andress and Claudine Auger.

== Cast ==
- Ursula Andress as Norma
- Virna Lisi as Luisa
- Claudine Auger as Esmerelda
- Marisa Mell as Paola
- Brett Halsey as Norma's husband
- Jean-Pierre Cassel as Luisa's husband
- Frank Wolff as Paola's husband
- Marco Guglielmi as Esmerelda's husband
- Mario Adorf as Traffic cop
- Vittorio Caprioli as Thief
- Franco Fabrizi as Luisa's lover
- Luciano Salce as Psychiatrist
- Lando Buzzanca
- Stash De Rola as second mistress of Luisa
- Margherita Guzzinati as Countess Matilde
- Arthur Hansel as Playboy
- Pietro Morfea as blackmailer
- Fred Williams as Esmeralda lover
- Lia Zoppelli as mother of Luisa
