= Buddha Mil Gaya =

1971 Hindi film directed by Hrishikesh Mukherjee

- Poster
- Directed by: Hrishikesh Mukherjee
- Written by: Screenplay: Bimal Dutt; Additional Scenes: D. N. Mukherji; Dialogues: Pal Mahindra
- Story by: Shyam Ramsay (credited as Shyam)
- Produced by: L. B. Lachman
- Starring: Om Prakash; Navin Nischol; Deven Verma; Archana
- Cinematography: Jaywant Pathare
- Edited by: Das Dhaimade
- Music by: R. D. Burman
- Release date: 15 October 1971
- Running time: 138 minutes
- Country: India
- Language: Hindi

Buddha Mil Gaya (lit. 'The old man is found') (Note: An interesting allusion to the murderer) is a 1971 Hindi-language comedy thriller (Note: The allusions to the comedy and thrill start from the titling itself. When the banner "produced by" comes up, one initially sees "Mistake" (produced by mistake), but this metamorphoses into L. B. Lachman. Immediately afterwards comes the banner of Hrishikesh Mukherjee. This time, the banner itself changes, saying "Murdered by" (Murdered by Hrishikesh Mukherjee). Then, the banner metamorphoses into "Directed by". These simple devices tell an informed viewer that he is in for a good comedy/thriller fare.) film, produced by L. B. Lachman and directed by Hrishikesh Mukherjee.

The film stars Om Prakash, Navin Nischol, Deven Verma, Archana, Sonia Sahni, Aruna Irani, Asit Sen and Lalita Pawar. The music is by R.D. Burman and the lyrics are by Majrooh Sultanpuri.

== Plot ==
Unemployed slackers Ajay and Bhola try to get some freelance photography gigs while lodging at an old woman's house. They have not paid their dues worth 3 months and need the landlady's granddaughter, Deepa's help to enter and exit the house while the old woman is asleep. Over time, Deepa and Ajay develop romantic feelings towards each other. Bhola goes to a nearby woman's safety organisation, Naari Sena, to photograph their activities for a photography contest and ends up developing romantic feelings towards their president, Parvati.

Ajay and Bhola come across a newspaper advertisement about a missing elderly gentleman, Girdharilal Sharma. The advertisement suggests that if Girdharilal doesn't appear in 15 days, his estate worth 15 lakh rupees will be distributed among his business partners. They chance upon him in the Hanging Gardens in Bombay and decide to introduce him to their landlady as their paternal uncle. While Bhola and Ajay try to find ways and means of getting rich by turning Girdharilal in, Girdharilal finds out their motive and asks to leave but the duo resists. They find out that Girdharilal has a gun and is not as innocent as he looks. They ask Deepa to keep Girdharilal engaged.

Deepa has been orphaned at a young age. Girdharilal reveals that his business associates trapped him into a falsified case and had him sent to jail, and he has also been separated from his wife and daughter, also named Deepa. Girdharilal takes an unusual parental interest in Deepa and teaches her Indian Classical music.

One by one, former business associates of Girdharilal, except Bhagat, are found murdered by Ajay and Bhola. They suspect Girdharilal of wrongdoing. Bhagat, the main conspirator of the plan to entrap Girdharilal, is scared for his life and orders his bodyguard Shetty to kidnap Deepa. Bhagat has a personal assistant, Mona who turns out to actually being Girdharilal's daughter who changes her name and joins Bhagat's office to avenge her father's sufferings. After a chaotic confrontation between Bhagat and Girdharilal, everyone's identity is discovered. Shetty turns out to be an undercover police officer. In the end it is revealed to all that Bhagat, not Girdharilal, is the actual murderer.

== Cast ==
- Navin Nischol as Ajay
- Deven Verma as Bhola
- Archana as Deepa
- Sonia Sahni as Mona
- Om Prakash as Girdharilal Sharma
- Aruna Irani as Parvati
- Lalita Pawar as Deepa's paternal grandmother
- Asit Sen as Jhunjhunwala
- M. B. Shetty as Shetty
- Brahm Bhardwaj as Bhagat
- Dulari as Nirmala Sharma

== Music ==
The lyrics were written by Majrooh Sultanpuri and the music was given by Rahul Dev Burman.

Song	Singer(s)	Raga
"Raat Kali Ek Khwab Mein Aayi"	Kishore Kumar	
"Bhali Bhali Si Ek Surat"	Kishore Kumar, Asha Bhosle	
"Aayo Kahan Se Ghanshyam"	Manna Dey, Archana	Khamaj
"Jiya Na Laage Mora"	Lata Mangeshkar	
"Mai Buddho Lambo Lambo"	Manna Dey, Lata Mangeshkar	
