= Claudine Auger =

French actress (1941–2019)

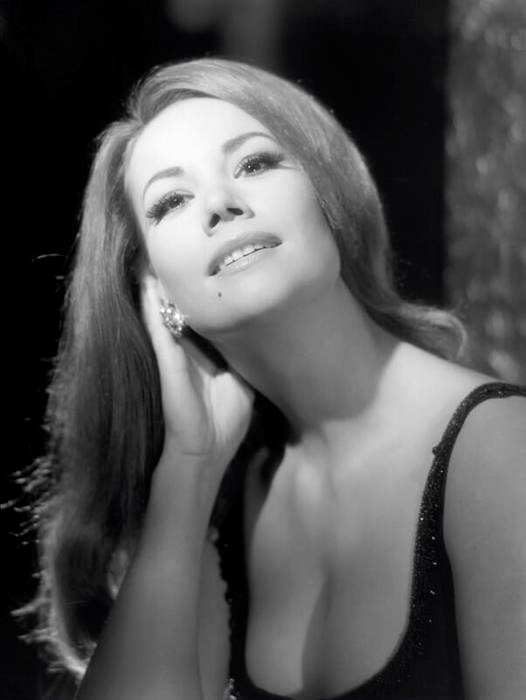
- Auger in 1966
- Born: Claudine Oger; 26 April 1941; Paris, German-occupied France
- Died: 18 December 2019 (aged 78); Paris, France
- Occupation: Actress
- Years active: 1958–1995
- Spouses: Pierre Gaspard-Huit (m. 1959; div. 1969) Peter Brent (m. 1984; died 2008)
- Children: 1

Claudine Auger, born Claudine Oger (French: [klodin oʒe]; 26 April 1941 – 18 December 2019), was a French actress best known for her role as a Bond girl, Dominique "Domino" Derval, in the James Bond film Thunderball (1965). She earned the title of Miss France Monde 1958 (the French representative to the Miss World beauty pageant) and went on to finish as the first runner-up in the 1958 Miss World contest.

== Career ==
Born in Paris, France, Auger began her career as a model and earned the title of Miss France Monde 1958 (the French representative to the Miss World beauty pageant) and went on to finish as the first runner-up in the 1958 Miss World contest. Jean Cocteau cast Auger in an uncredited role as a tall ballerina in Testament of Orpheus (1960). When she was 18, she married the 43-year-old writer-director Pierre Gaspard-Huit, and he cast her in several films, including Le Masque de fer (1962) and Kali Yug: Goddess of Vengeance (1963).

In 1965 she was cast in the 1965 James Bond film Thunderball, directed by Terence Young. Thunderball launched Auger into a successful European movie career, but did little for her otherwise in the United States. Though she performed in the movie, her French accent was considered too strong and her voice was dubbed by another actress. She did, however, star in a Danny Thomas special called The Road to Lebanon with Bing Crosby, which was shown on NBC on 20 April 1966.

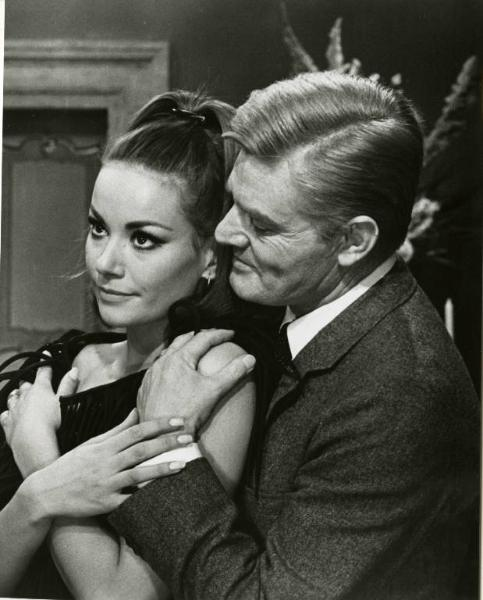
Auger with Marco Guglielmi in Anyone Can Play (1967)

In 1966 she co-starred in the World War II drama Triple Cross with Yul Brynner and Christopher Plummer, that reunited her with her James Bond director Terence Young. Auger co-starred with another Bond girl, Ursula Andress, in the Italian comedy Anyone Can Play (1967). She starred with two future Bond girls, Barbara Bouchet and Barbara Bach, in Black Belly of the Tarantula (1971), a giallo mystery. She had major roles in films such as The Killing Game in 1967, Flic Story in 1972, and filmed scenes for The Eiger Sanction (1975), only to have her entire performance cut from the movie.

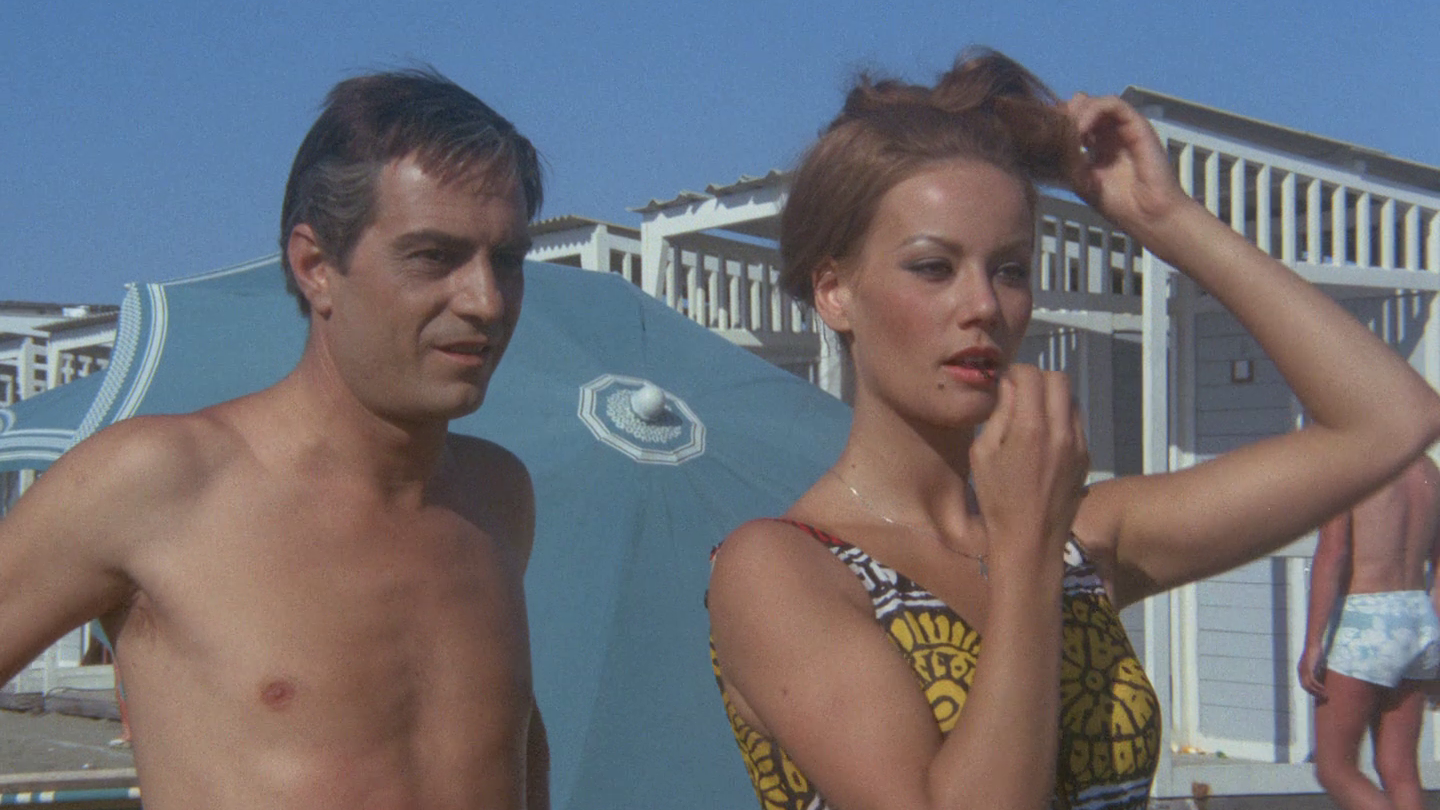
Claudine Auger with Nino Manfredi in The Head of the Family (1967)

On television, she made an appearance in 1972 on the CBS series Medical Center. In the 1980s Auger starred The Man Who Married a French Wife which was broadcast on the BBC and shown as part of the "Great Performances" series that was broadcast on PBS in the United States. She also appeared in the 1994 British television series The Memoirs of Sherlock Holmes.

== Personal life and death ==
In 1959, she married French film director and screenwriter Pierre Gaspard-Huit. They later divorced in 1969. She married British businessman Peter Brent in 1984. He died in 2008. They had one child.

Auger died in Paris on 18 December 2019 following a lengthy illness.

== Filmography ==
Year	Title	Role	Notes
1958	Christine		Uncredited
1960	Testament of Orpheus	Minerva	
1960	Terrain vague	the salesgirl	
1961	Les Moutons de Panurge	Monique	Uncredited
1962	The Seven Deadly Sins	the new waitress	(segment "Envie, L'"), Uncredited
1962	Le Masque de fer	Isabelle de Saint-Marc	
1963	In the French Style	Clio Andropolous	
1963	Kali Yug: Goddess of Vengeance	Amrita	
1963	The Mystery of the Indian Temple	Amrita	Mario Camerini
1964	Games of Desire	Elektra Tzanou	
1965	Yo Yo	Isolina	
1965	The Reckless		Uncredited
1965	Thunderball	Dominique Derval ("Domino")	
1966	That Man George	Lila	
1966	Treasure of San Gennaro	Concettina	
1966	Triple Cross	Paulette	
1966	The Devil in Love	Maddalena de' Medici	
1967	The Killing Game	Jacqueline Meyrand	
1967	The Head of the Family	Adriana	
1967	Anyone Can Play	Esmeralda	
1968	Escalation	Carla Maria Manini	
1968	Adriatic Sea of Fire	Mirjana	
1968	Listen, Let's Make Love	Ida Bernasconi	
1968	The Cats	Barbara	
1969	Love Birds	Marina	
1969	Come ti chiami, amore mio?		
1971	Equinozio		
1971	Black Belly of the Tarantula	Laura	
1971	A Bay of Blood	Renata Donati	
1971	Un peu de soleil dans l'eau froide	Nathalie Silvener	
1972	Gli ordini sono ordini	Giorgia's friend	
1972	The Summertime Killer	Michèle	
1974	Borsalino & Co.	Une passagère sur le paquebot	Uncredited
1974	La dynamite est bonne à boire	Consuelo	
1975	L'Intrépide	Sophie	
1975	Flic Story	Catherine	
1976	Big Pot		
1976	Cuando los maridos se iban a la guerra	Sol	
1977	Pane, burro e marmellata	Betty	
1978	The Bermuda Triangle	Sybill	
1978	Butterfly on the Shoulder	The coat's Woman	
1979	Lovers and Liars	Elisa Massacesi	
1979	Lobster for Breakfast	Carla Spinosi	
1979	The Associate	Agnès Pardot	
1980	Fantastica	Johanna MacPherson	
1980	Prestami tua moglie	Diana	
1981	Black Jack (a.k.a. Asalto al casino)	Jill Stradford	
1984	Secret Places	Sophie Meister	
1985	The Repenter	Rosa Ragusa	
1986	Les Exploits d'un jeune Don Juan	the mother	
1988	Un amore di donna	Gabriella's mother	
1988	The Sparrow's Fluttering	Dino's widow	
1991	La bocca	Countess Veronica Rospigliosi	
1992	Salt on Our Skin	Mrs. McEwan	
1994	L'ombra della sera	La mère d'Eva	Television Film
1995	Los hombres siempre mienten	Isabelle	
1995	Un orage immobile	Artémise d'Aubec	Television Film
1997	Le rouge et le noir	Madame de Fervaques	
