= Vimi =

Indian actress

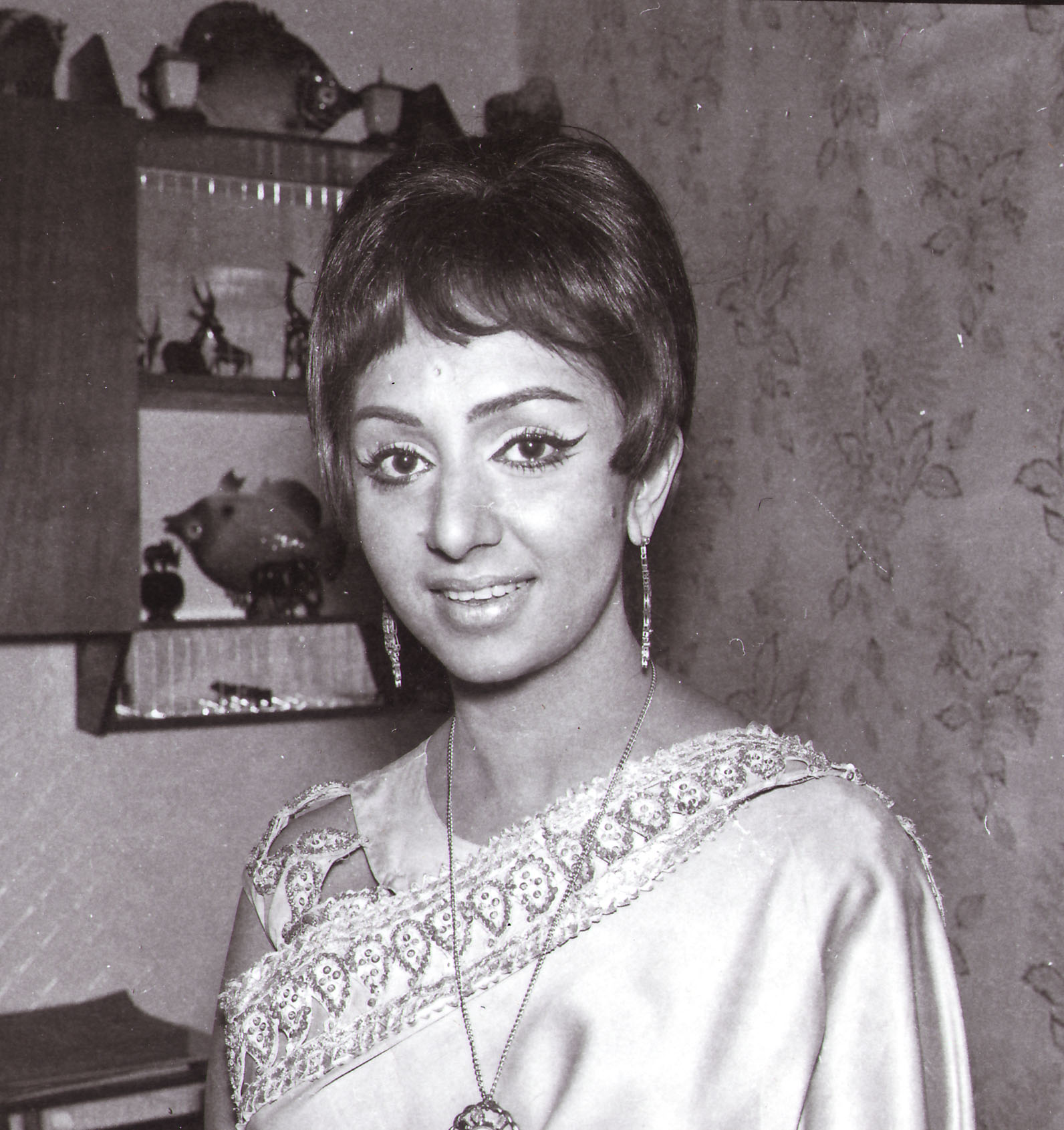
- Vimi in 1968
- Born: Vimlesh Kaur Wadhwan; January 1943; Jalandhar, Punjab
- Died: 22 August 1977 (aged 34); Mumbai
- Years active: 1967–1977
- Known for: Bollywood films

Vimi (born Vimlesh Kaur Wadhwan; January 1943 – 22 August 1977) was an Indian actress who acted in Indian films such as Hamraaz, Aabroo, Nanak Nam Jahaz Hai (Punjabi film), and Patanga. She was best known for her role in Hamraaz (1967) opposite Sunil Dutt. According to film expert Rajesh Subramanian, a fraud film broker named Jolly ruined her career and image, by posing as a fake boyfriend and forcing Vimi into prostitution.

== Early life and career ==
Vimi was born on January 1943 as Vimlesh Kaur Wadhavan in a Punjabi Sikh family. She married Shiv Agarwal, an industrialist's son, with whom she had a son Rajneesh Agarwal (later Ozen Rajneesh; born 20 January 1961) and a daughter Shona (born 19 January 1963). It was a love marriage, against the wishes of her family. Due to her age and caste difference, her family opposed this marriage. Music Director Ravi was introduced to her at a party in Calcutta and later invited her and Shiv to Mumbai. He introduced them to B. R. Chopra and that is how Vimi got her first film. Even though her husband initially supported her decision, her parents and relatives were against Vimi joining the film industry.

In 1967, Vimi debuted opposite Sunil Dutt in the B. R. Chopra's Hamraaz. The film was a huge hit. When Sunil Dutt sang to her ("Na Sar Jhuka Ke Jeeyo, Na Muh Chhupake Jeeyo"), the expressions of Vimi were appreciated by the audience. She was known as the most beautiful actress. Her Filmfare photoshoot, in which she wore a stylised swimsuit, made headlines. After the success of Hamraaz, her next film Aabroo was released in 1968, which bombed at the box office. In 1969, Vimi acted in a Punjabi film Nanak Nam Jahaz Hai (starring Prithviraj Kapoor). In 1971, she acted in Patanga opposite Shashi Kapoor, which failed at the box office. After that she was reduced to posing for photoshoots in magazines and soon went into oblivion. Her last film was Krodhi starring Dharmendra, in which she played a small role as the mistress of a smuggler, played by Amrish Puri; the film was released in 1981, more than three years after her death.

In an obituary released after her death, several hostile details were revealed, which included her being physically abused by her husband and their eventual divorce. Following her separation, she had started a textile business in Calcutta but that failed as well, leaving her homeless. She had started a relationship with a film broker called Jolly but he had allegedly sold her into prostitution. Devastated by her professional and personal life, Vimi took refuge in alcohol.

== Death ==
Vimi died on 22 August 1977 from liver disease caused by alcohol consumption in the general ward of the Nanavati hospital in Mumbai. Her body was dishonourably taken to the crematorium in a thela hand cart.

== Filmography ==
=== Film ===
Year	Movies	Role	Notes
1967	Hamraaz	Meena Verma	Debut film
1968	Aabroo	Neena	
1969	Nanak Nam Jahaz Hai	Charanjit Kaur (Channi)	National Award winning Punjabi film
1971	Guddi	(Herself)	Cameo
1971	Kahin Aar Kahin Paar	Dancer princess	
1971	Patanga	Renu	
1973	Kahani Hum Sab Ki	Sarla	
1974	Vachan	Vimi Ramnarayan	
1978	Premi Gangaram	Leela	Posthumous release
1981	Krodhi	Madhavan's mistress	Posthumous release
