= Kahani Hum Sab Ki =

- Directed by: Rajkumar Kohli
- Written by: Jaggi Rampal
- Starring: Mala Sinha; Vinod Mehra; Om Prakash; Vimi
- Music by: Laxmikant–Pyarelal
- Release date: 1973
- Country: India
- Language: Hindi

Kahani Hum Sab Ki is a 1973 Bollywood romantic drama film directed by Rajkumar Kohli. The film stars Mala Sinha, Vinod Mehra, Om Prakash, Vimi, Roopesh Kumar and Lalita Pawar and.

== Cast ==
- Mala Sinha as Sandhya
- Vinod Mehra as Prabhat
- Om Prakash as Bhagwan Das
- Vimi as Sarla Devi
- Roopesh Kumar as Ramesh
- Lalita Pawar
- Aruna Irani

== Songs ==
1. "Bach Ke Kaha Jaoge Kiche Huye Chale Aaoge" – Lata Mangeshkar
