= Kali Yug: Goddess of Vengeance =

1963 film

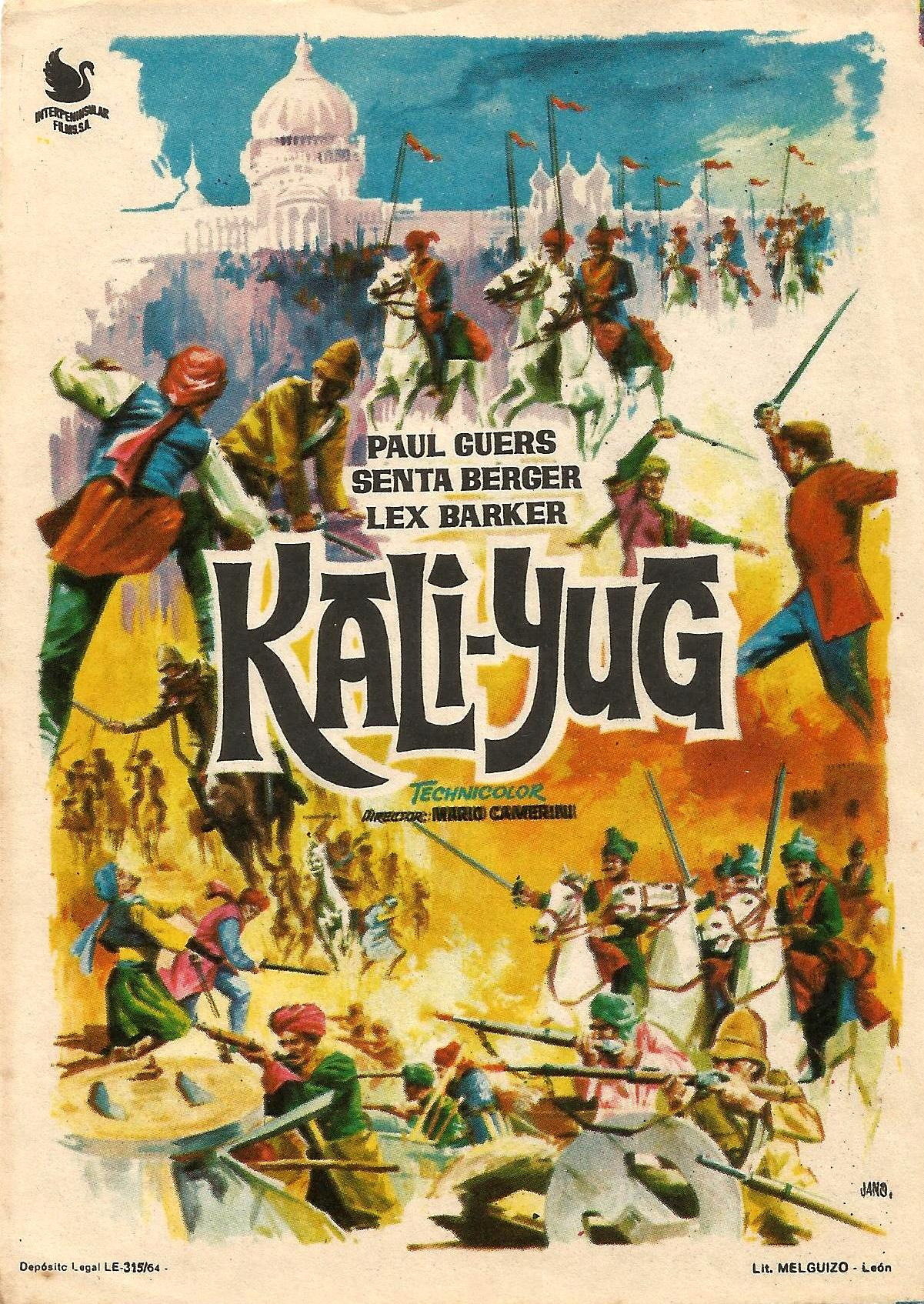
- Directed by: Mario Camerini
- Written by: Leonardo Benvenuti; Piero De Bernardi; Guy Elmes; Robert Westerby
- Produced by: Renato Dandi
- Starring: Paul Guers
- Cinematography: Aldo Tonti
- Edited by: Teddy Darvas
- Release date: 7 November 1963
- Running time: 100 minutes
- Country: Italy
- Language: Italian

Kali Yug: Goddess of Vengeance (Italian: Kali Yug, la dea della vendetta and also known as Vengeance of Kali) is a 1963 Italian fantasy film directed by Mario Camerini and starring Paul Guers. A a second part The Mystery of the Indian Temple was released the same year.

== Cast ==
- Paul Guers – Dr. Simon Palmer
- Senta Berger – Catherine Talbot
- Lex Barker – Maj. Ford
- Sergio Fantoni – Ram Chand
- Klaus Kinski – Saddhu
- Ian Hunter – Robert Talbot
- I. S. Johar – Gopal
- Claudine Auger – Amrita
- Joachim Hansen – Lt. Collins
- Michael Medwin – Capt. Walsh
- Roldano Lupi – Maharadja d'Hasnabad
- Alfio Caltabiano – The Crie
- Luciano Conversi – Kanchan
- Paul Muller – Botanist Alamian
