= Johar Mehmood in Hong Kong =

- Directed by: S.A. Akbar
- Starring: Mehmood; Sonia Sahni; I. S. Johar; Aruna Irani
- Release date: 1971
- Country: India
- Language: Hindi

Johar Mehmood in Hong Kong is a 1971 Bollywood comedy film directed by S.A. Akbar. The film stars Mehmood and I. S. Johar. Its part of a comedy series that included Johar-Mehmood in Goa (1965), Johar in Kashmir (1966) and Johar in Bombay (1967).

== Synopsis ==
Johar Mehmood in Hong Kong is an intelligence satire, the basic of all I. S. Johar films, in which it is left to the viewer how he interprets the scenes with laughter or introspection.

The film is the story of two conmen, Ramesh (I. S. Johar) and Mahesh (Mehmood), whose only life purposes are to make the most money by cheating and theft. They land in the hands of a high-profile Portuguese dictator (Kamal Kapoor), who wants to blow up India with the formula of an atomic bomb, a Nuclear weapon developed by a scientist of Hong Kong, who is killed along with his daughter by high treasonous thieves in the hope of securing the formula, which, however, the scientist has already secured in a safe deposit locker in the Bank of Hong Kong. Coincidentally, the scientist's daughter is a look-alike of a girl called Ms. Sonia / Usha Roy (Sonia Sahni), who the dictator wants to act as the deceased patriotic daughter, go to the bank using her identity and take out the formula, to be later secured by him, and misused against India. For this, he makes Mr. Pran (Pran), his CID officer to be close to Sonia as her engaged partner, after she wins the Beauty contest of Miss Bombay. Simultaneously, he orders another of his cronies, Ramayan Tiwari, to pursue Ramesh and Mahesh, that they should also become the love interests of Sonia, so that she could be brought to Hong Kong on some pretext or the other. The story takes a turn when Mahesh really falls in love with Sonia, while posing as a blind man, out to win her sympathies, but not before she realizes the truth and is totally hurt, that he tried to cheat her as a blind man. Repentant Ramesh and Mahesh now becoming totally patriotic, decide to go to Hong Kong with Sonia and catch the culprits who want to inflict such drastic harm to India.

== Cast ==
- Mehmood as Mahesh / Ms. Dhanwanti / Panditji
- I. S. Johar as Ramesh / Prince Of Pagdandi / Sheikh Nek Sirat / Dr. Eyewalla
- Sonia Sahni as Ms. Sonia / Usha Roy
- Aruna Irani
- Pran as Mr. Pran
- Kamal Kapoor as Boss
- Tun Tun as Sonia's Aunt
- Murad
- Ramayan Tiwari as Diwan Tiwari
- Manorama
- Agha
- Madhumati
- Mehmood Jr.
- Raj Kishore

== Music ==
Composed by Kalyanji-Anandi with assistants Laxmikant-Pyarelal with lyrics by Qamar Jalalabadi.

1. "He Mai Jab Jab Pir Padi, O Ambe Mayyaa" - Mohammed Rafi, Mukesh
2. "Nathaniya Haale To Bada Maza" - Shamshad Begum
3. "Jalati Hai Duniyaa, Pyaar Ki Gaadi Chalati Rahe" - Mukesh, Usha Khanna
4. "Tumhare Dil Ko Ulfat Ka" - Usha Timothy, Laxmi Shankar
5. "Mehbooba Mehbooba Mehbooba" - Mohammed Rafi
6. "Balam Calcutta Pahunch Gaye" - Asha Bhosle, Usha Mangeshkar
7. "Tu Jane Ya Na Jane Tum Jaoge Jahan" - Mohammed Rafi, Manna Dey

The song "Mehbooba Mehbooba Mehbooba" is picturised on Jr. Mehmood in this film, but the original song is from "Sadhu Aur Shaitan (1968) and picturised on Mehmood and Bharathi.

== See also ==
- Johar-Mehmood in Goa
