= Johar-Mehmood in Goa =

Johar Mehmood in Goa
- Directed by: I. S. Johar
- Produced by: I. S. Johar
- Starring: Mehmood; Simi Garewal; I. S. Johar
- Music by: Kalyanji–Anandji
- Release date: 1 April 1965
- Country: India
- Language: Hindi

Johar Mehmood in Goa is a 1965 Bollywood comedy film directed by I. S. Johar with him, with Mehmood and Simi Garewal playing the lead roles. It's part of a comedy series that included Johar in Kashmir (1966), Johar in Bombay (1967) and Johar Mehmood in Hong Kong (1971).

== Plot ==
Pregnant Mary is about to be married to Peter when he is asked to re-join his regiment to go to war. But he does not come back and is assumed to be dead. Mary gives birth to twins but leaves them on the doorsteps of two Goan households, one Muslim and another Hindu. Twenty-four years later, India is a free country, while Goa is under the rule of the Portuguese. Ram and Rahim grow up to be members of the underground resistance movement. Mary is the Mother Superior and Peter, who is still alive, is the Deputy Superintendent of Police in Goa, who is entrusted the task of catching Ram and Rahim, who plan and execute a series of anti-state activities.

== Cast ==
- Mehmood as Rahim Mohammad Salauddin
- I. S. Johar as Ram
- Simi Garewal as Simmi
- Sonia Sahni as Rita
- Mumtaz Begum as Mrs. Salauddin
- Leela Chitnis as Pandit's Wife
- Kamal Kapoor as Police Supdt. Alburqueue
- Sulochana as Mother Superior Mary
- Murad as Moulvi Mohammad Salauddin
- Moolchand as Chhota Diwana
- Mukri as Master / Headmaster Pinto
- Raza Murad as Young Rahim
- Surendra Nath as Dy. Supdt. of Police Peter
- D.K. Sapru as Hakim
- Tun Tun as Simmi's Cellmate

== Soundtrack ==
The music of the film was composed by Kalyanji–Anandji and lyrics by Qamar Jalalabadi.

1. "Kuch Bhi Kahe Duniyawale" – Kishore Kumar, Shamshad Begum
2. "Aji Aisi Nazar ko" – Mohammed Rafi
3. "Aankhiyan Na Noor Hai Tu" – Mukesh, Suman Kalyanpur
4. "Dheere Re Chalo" – Mukesh
5. "Mar Gayi Allah" – Kamal Barot, Shamshad Begum
6. "Na Koi Raha Hai" – Mukesh, Usha Khanna
7. "Yeh Do Deewane Dil Ke" – Mohd Rafi & Manna Dey
8. "Na Koi Raha Hai v2" – Mukesh & Usha Khanna

== See also ==
- Johar Mehmood in Hong Kong
