= Namit Malhotra =

Indian film producer and visual effects executive (born 1976)

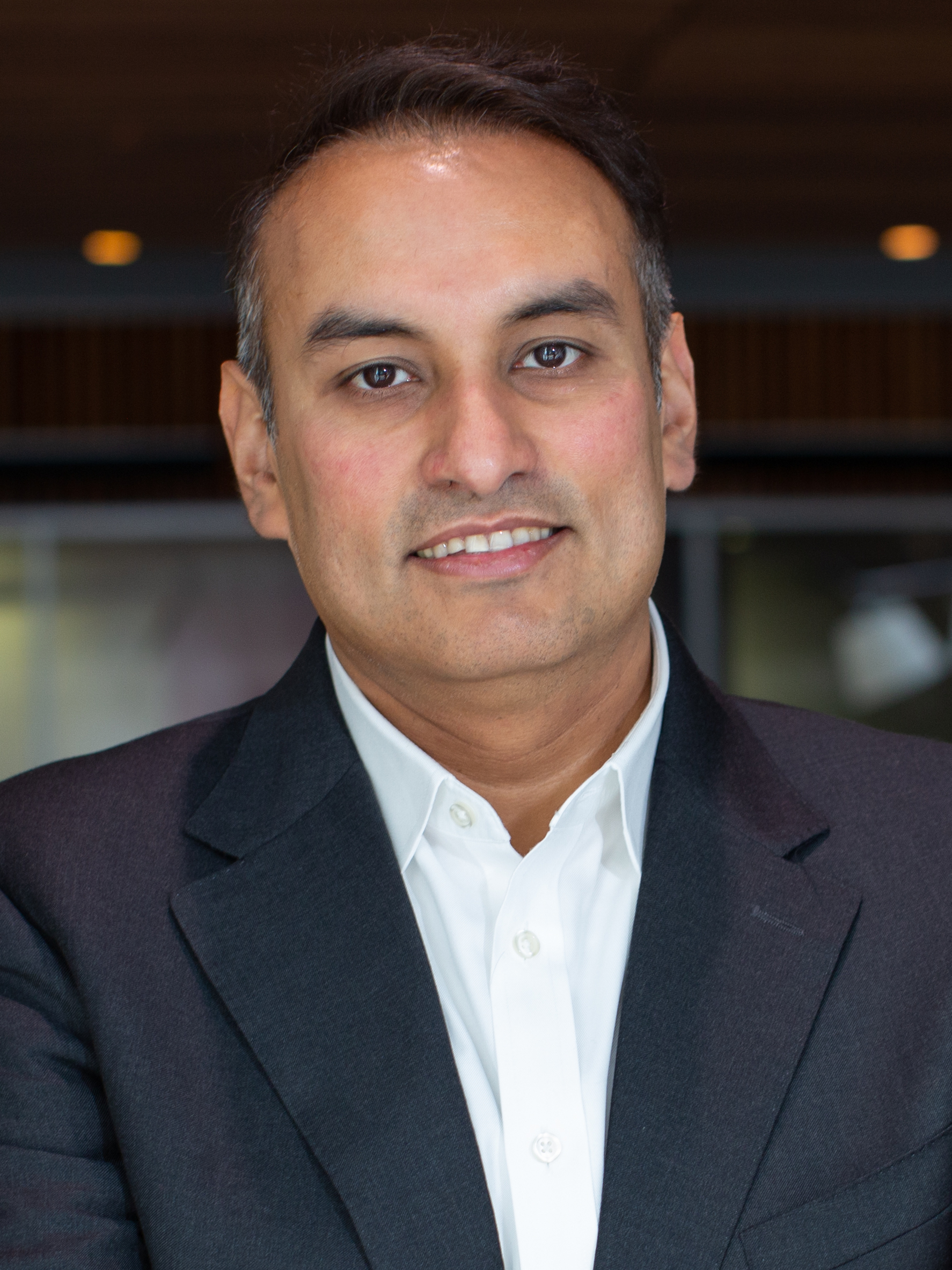
- Malhotra in 2021
- Born: Namit Malhotra; 2 April 1976 (age 50); Mumbai, India
- Education: H.R. College of Commerce and Economics, Mumbai
- Occupations: Chief Executive Officer of DNEG; Founder and Non-Executive Chairman of Prime Focus
- Relatives: M. N. Malhotra (grandfather)

Namit Malhotra (born 2 April 1976) is an Indian film and television producer and a business executive. He is the founder and non-executive director of Indian visual and special effects company Prime Focus Limited, the world's largest independent integrated media services company, and the chief executive officer of its British-Indian subsidiary DNEG which specializes in visual effects, animation and stereo conversion.

== Early life and education ==
Malhotra is the eldest son of Bollywood film producer Naresh Malhotra and grandson of cinematographer M. N. Malhotra, who worked on one of India's first colour films in 1953, Jhansi Ki Rani. He grew up in Mumbai, India and went to Jasudben M L School, Khar. He graduated with a bachelor's degree in commerce from H.R. College of Commerce and Economics, Mumbai.

== Career ==
In 1995, Malhotra enrolled in a computer graphics school, where he saw how whole movies could be created on computers. He later recruited three of his teachers at the school as co-founders and started Video Workshop, an editing studio in his father's garage.

Over the next two years, Video Workshop completed work on many television shows and serials (like Boogie Woogie for Sony, Colgate Top 10 for Zee Entertainment, Gaatha for Star India), advertisement films/TVC's (for producers like Sunil Manchanda of MAD Entertainment) and music videos (for producers like Sanjay Gupta, Kunal Kohli and Anubhav Sinha). It also ran the post-production facility for Channel V.

In 1997, Malhotra merged Video Workshop's business with Naresh Malhotra's Video Works, a film production equipment rental business to create Prime Focus. Prime Focus provided technological creative services such as visual effects, sound and digital intermediate (DI) for television and movies.

It was one of the earliest companies to set up a scanning and recording system (2001) and DI system (2003) in India. It was also the first visual effects company in India to operate a Motion Controlled Rig (2004).

In 2006, Malhotra listed Prime Focus on the Indian stock exchange and he became the first managing director and chief executive officer of the newly-listed company. Prime Focus expanded globally with the launch of Prime Focus World (PFW), which acquired visual effects (VFX), broadcast and post-production facilities in London, New York, Los Angeles and Vancouver.

In 2009, using Prime Focus World's proprietary View-D technology, the company converted Clash of the Titans into 3D. The work on this movie led to Prime Focus delivering stereo conversions for a number of other movie blockbusters, including: Star Wars: Episode I, Star Wars: Episode II – Attack of the Clones, and Star Wars: Episode III – Revenge of the Sith; Harry Potter and the Deathly Hallows – Part 1 and Harry Potter and the Deathly Hallows – Part 2; The Chronicles of Narnia: The Voyage of the Dawn Treader; Wrath of the Titans; Transformers: Dark of the Moon; and Shrek 2.

In October 2011, Malhotra relinquished his role as managing director of Prime Focus Limited to Ramki Sankaranarayanan. In 2012, he secured standard chartered private equity to invest in Prime Focus and diluted his stake in Prime Focus World to bring onboard Aid Capital Partners and Macquarie Capital Group in 2013.

In July 2014, Malhotra merged Prime Focus World with Double Negative (DNEG), a London-based visual effects (VFX) studio, which at the time was behind the VFX of Inception (2010), winner of the Academy Award for Best Visual Effects in 2011, and again earlier that year with Interstellar (2014). Since then, DNEG has won an additional 6 Academy Awards for Best Visual Effects for Ex Machina (2014), Blade Runner 2049 (2017), First Man (2018), Tenet (2020), Dune (2021), and Dune: Part Two (2024). Following the merger, Malhotra became the chairman and CEO.

In August 2021, Malhotra's stake in Prime Focus Limited, DNEG's parent company, was boosted to 70% from 35% following a $250 million investment from UK-based firm Novator Capital Advisors. Malhotra remained chairman and CEO of DNEG following the transaction.

On 25 January 2022, DNEG announced its entry into a definitive business combination agreement with Sports Ventures Acquisition Corp. (Nasdaq: AKIC). Upon the closing of the business combination, subject to customary closing conditions including the approval of the stockholders of Sports Ventures Acquisition Corp., the combined public company was to be named DNEG. The listing was cancelled in June 2022 citing unfavourable market conditions.

In addition to his business career, Malhotra is also a film producer. His credits include The Hurricane Heist (2018), Horizon Line (2020), Brahmāstra: Part One – Shiva (2022), the animated feature The Garfield Movie (2024), and the epic film Ramayana: Part 1 (2026).

=== producer ===
| Year | Film | Language | Notes |
|---|---|---|---|
| 2018 | The Hurricane Heist | English | |
| 2020 | Horizon Line | English | |
| 2022 | Brahmāstra: Part One – Shiva | Hindi | |
| 2024 | The Garfield Movie | English | |
| 2026 | Ramayana: Part 1 | Hindi | |
