= Homage at Siesta Time =

1962 film

- Directed by: Leopoldo Torre Nilsson
- Written by: Leopoldo Torre Nilsson; Beatriz Guido (play)
- Starring: Alida Valli; Paul Guers; Alexandra Stewart
- Cinematography: Alberto Etchebehere
- Edited by: Jacinto Cascales
- Music by: Jorge López Ruiz
- Release date: 1962
- Running time: 85 minute
- Language: Spanish

Homage at Siesta Time (Spanish: Homenaje a la hora de la siesta, French: Quatre femmes pour un héros, Portuguese: Quatro Mulheres Para Um Herói, also known as Four Women for One Hero) is a 1962 drama film written and directed by Leopoldo Torre Nilsson. It is based on the play with the same name written by Beatriz Guido. An Argentine-French-Brazilian co-production, it was entered into the main competition at the 23rd Venice International Film Festival.

== Cast ==
- Alida Valli as Constance
- Paul Guers as Henri Balmant
- Alexandra Stewart as Marianne
- Violeta Antier as Lilian
- Luigi Picchi as Aloysio
- Glauce Rocha as Berenice
- Maurice Sarfati as Lombardo
