= Premi Gangaram =

- Poster
- Directed by: Jagdish Nirula
- Starring: Ashok Kumar; I. S. Johar; Yogeeta Bali; Vimi; Satish Kaul
- Music by: Sonik Omi
- Release date: 1978
- Country: India
- Language: Hindi

Premi Gangaram is a 1978 Bollywood romance film directed by Jagdish Nirula. The main star-cast includes Ashok Kumar, I. S. Johar, Yogeeta Bali, Vimi and Satish Kaul.

== Plot ==
Gangaram is a talented singer who lives in a small village in Punjab. He is deeply in love with Jamuna. Despite the village knowing of their romance, Jamuna's father disapproves and tries every trick to separate them. When his efforts fail, he takes Jamuna to the city.

Undeterred, Gangaram follows, scouring the city streets for his beloved. By chance, he encounters Leela, a social worker whom he rescues from some goons. He accepts Leela as his sister and finds a place to stay. Meanwhile, Lela is in love with Satish, but Satish's greedy father opposes their union.

Satish's father, in a twist of fate, arranges his son's marriage to none other than Jamuna. Leela's social work has also earned her enemies, including a looter who is friends with Satish's father. This villain abducts Leela, but Gangaram once again comes to her rescue.

As Satish's father attempts to force the marriage with Jamuna, Gangaram devises a clever plan: he swaps the brides, ensuring Satish marries Leela. The story concludes with Gangaram winning a prize for helping to arrest the goon, and finally, Jamuna's father, perhaps seeing Gangaram's true worth, gives his blessing for Gangaram and Jamuna to marry. The end turns out to be a happing ending for both the couples - Gangaram gets Jamuna and Leela gets Satish.

== Cast ==
- Ashok Kumar
- I. S. Johar as Gangaram
- Yogeeta Bali as Jamuna
- Vimi as Leela
- Satish Kaul as Satish
- Randhir as Satish's father
- Bindu
- Anwar Hussain
- Tun Tun as Dano
- Birbal as Pandet
- Kartar Singh as Sikh Post man
- Jankidas as Jankidas
- Mehar Mittal
- Dolly
- Jugnu
- Kirti Bahi
- Kuldip Kaur
- Laila
- Moolchand as Gangaram's father
- Paul Sharma as Rai Bahdur
- Saigal
- Seema Kapoor
- Shama
- Uttam Sodi
- Yasmin

== Soundtrack ==
Music composed by Sonik Omi and lyrics were written by Verma Malik.

Track list
No.	Title	Lyrics	Singer(s)	Length
1.	"Laddu Batati"	Verma Malik	Asha Bhosle
2.	"Billiyan Billiyan Ankhen"	Verma Malik	Asha Bhosle
3.	"Khunda Khol"	Verma Malik	Tun Tun, Omi
4.	"Banwari Sunle Araji Hamari"	Verma Malik	Mohammed Rafi
5.	"Gangaram Se Na Ankhiyan Milana"	Verma Malik	Mohammed Rafi, Rani Gaurala
6.	"Buddha Peechhe Pad Gaya"	Verma Malik	Mohammed Rafi, Sumitra Lahiri
7.	"Mera Tujhe Bhi Salaam"	Verma Malik	Mohammed Rafi, Rani Gaurala
8.	"Ek Mahi Dil Ko Hi Das Gaya"	Verma Malik	Asha Bhosle, Rani Gaurala
