= Sunil Sikand =

Indian film director (born 1949)

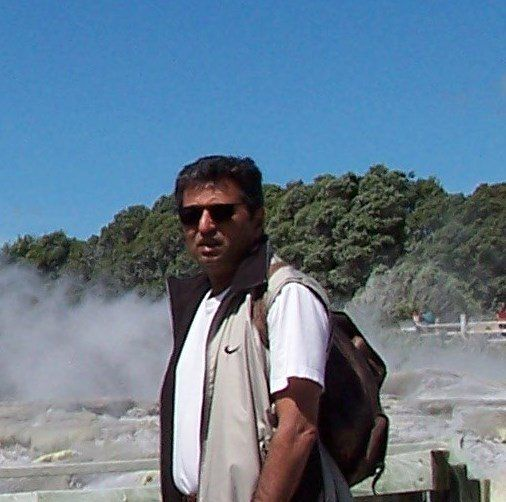
- Sunil Sikand
- Born: Sunil Sikand; 19 September 1949 (age 76); Bombay, Bombay State, India
- Occupation: Film director
- Years active: 1977–1991
- Spouse: Jyoti Sikand (m. 1973; div. 1982)
- Children: Siddharth Sikand
- Parent(s): Pran and Shukla Sikand

Sunil Sikand is an Indian film director and son of actor Pran. He directed his first film in 1984 called Farishta and second film in 1991 called Lakshmanrekha starring Jackie Shroff, Naseeruddin Shah, Shammi Kapoor, Danny Denzongpa and his father Pran.

== Personal life ==
Sunil Sikand was married to Jyoti Sikand Ahluwalia and they have one son Siddharth Sikand. The couple separated in 1982.

== Filmography ==
1977	Dharam Veer	assistant director
1977	Parvarish	second unit director
1979	Suhaag	second unit director
1984	Farishta	director and producer
1991	Lakshmanrekha	director
