= Paanch Dushman =

- Directed by: Shyam Ralhan
- Starring: Vinod Khanna, Shatrughan Sinha, Pran, Prem Chopra
- Release date: 1973
- Country: India
- Language: Hindi

Paanch Dushman is a Bollywood action film directed by Shyam Ralhan. The film stars Vinod Khanna. It was set to release in 1973, but for unknown reasons, it was released in 1983 with the name Daulat Ke Dushman.

== Music ==
- "Jeena Toh Hai, Par Ai Dil Kahan" – Kishore Kumar
- "Jana Hain Hume Toh Jahan Karar Mile" – Kishore Kumar, Lata Mangeshkar
- "Bichuva Bane Piya Tere Nain" – Asha Bhosle
- "Hum Toh Hain Sabke Yaar" – Kishore Kumar, Asha Bhosle
- "Jo Bhi Hua Hai Woh Pyar Me Hua Hai" – Kishore Kumar
- "Samjha Me Kismat Khul Gaye" – Mohammed Rafi
