= Miss India (1957 film) =

- Directed by: I. S. Johar
- Produced by: Rawal Films
- Starring: Nargis
- Music by: S. D. Burman
- Release date: 1957
- Country: India
- Language: Hindi

Miss India is a 1957 Indian Hindi-language film directed by I. S. Johar, and produced under the banner of Rawal Films. The film's music was composed by S. D. Burman. Nargis starred in the film as the eponymous character.

The film premiered in Bombay in May 1957. It earned positive reviews in The Times of India for its "popular appeal", "good direction", and "fine acting".
