= Rahu Ketu (1978 film) =

Indian Hindi-language film

- Directed by: B. R. Ishara
- Produced by: B. D. Pandey
- Starring: Shashi Kapoor; Rekha; Premnath; Pran; Bindu; Aruna Irani
- Music by: Kalyanji-Anandji
- Release date: 1978
- Country: India
- Language: Hindi

Rahu Ketu is a 1978 Bollywood action film directed by B. R. Ishara. It stars Premnath and Pran in title roles, with Shashi Kapoor, Rekha, Bindu, and Aruna Irani in pivotal roles. The music was composed by Kalyanji-Anandji.

== Cast ==
- Shashi Kapoor as CBI Officer Ravi Kapoor
- Rekha as Tulsi
- Premnath as Collector Nath / Rahu
- Pran as Karim / Ketu
- Bindu as Sheela
- Aruna Irani as Rani
- Kamini Kaushal as Chandramukhi
- Asit Sen as Radhe Shyam
- Jayshree T. as Dancer / Singer
- Leena Das as Dancer / Singer
- Alka as Rita
- Kanhaiyalal as Ram Prasad
- Jagdish Raj as Inspector Thakur
- Raj Mehra as Ravi's Boss
- Ram Mohan as Ranjeet
- Shivraj as Mohandas

== Songs ==
Lyrics: Verma Malik

Song	Singer
"Yeh Surahi Kare"	Asha Bhosle
"Mujhe Chhuna Na"	Asha Bhosle
"Thehri Tujhpe Meri Nazar"	Asha Bhosle
"Main Hoon Tera Prem Aur Tum Ho Mere Pran"	Mohammed Rafi, Manna Dey
