= Sadanand =

Sadanand is an Indian name. It may refer to

- Sadanand Bakre, Indian painter and sculptor
- Sadanand Chavan, Indian politician
- Sadanand Date, Indian Police Service officer
- Sadanand Deshmukh, Marathi language author
- Sadanand Dhume, American writer and journalist
- Sadanand Gowda, Indian politician
- Sadanand Joshi, Indian entrepreneur
- Sadanand Maharaj, Fijian politician
- Sadanand Maiya, Indian entrepreneur
- Sadanand Menon, Indian art critic
- Sadanand Singh, Indian politician
- Sadanand Tanavade, Indian politician
- Sadanand Viswanath, Indian cricketer
- Swaminathan Sadanand, Indian journalist
- Daniel Sadanand, New Testament Scholar
- Kabir Sadanand, Indian actor and film director
