= I. S. Johar =

Indian actor (1920–1984)

- Born: Indra Sen Johar; 16 February 1920; Talagang, Punjab, British India (present-day Punjab, Pakistan)
- Died: 10 March 1984 (aged 64); Bombay, Maharashtra, India
- Occupations: Actor, director, producer, writer
- Years active: 1931–1984
- Spouses: Ramma Bains (divorced): Sonia Sahni; and three others
- Children: 2
- Relatives: Johar family

Indra Sen Johar (16 February 1920 – 10 March 1984) was an Indian actor, writer, producer and director, who excelled in comedic roles and is best known to international audiences for portraying Gasim in the epic film classic Lawrence of Arabia.

== Early life ==
Indra Sen Johar was born on 16 February 1920 in Talagang City, Talagang District, Punjab, British India (now within modern-day Talagang District, Punjab, Pakistan). He did an MA degree in Economics and Politics before completing his LLB. In August 1947, during the Partition of India, Johar was visiting Patiala with his family for a wedding when serious rioting broke out in Lahore, resulting in the Shah Alami Bazaar, once the largely Hindu quarter of the Walled City, being entirely burnt down.

Johar never returned to Lahore. For a period he worked in Jalandhar while his family remained in Delhi, before he eventually moved to Bombay, where he made his acting debut in the 1949 Hindi comedy action film Ek Thi Ladki.

== Career ==
Johar acted in numerous Hindi films from the 1950s through to the early 1980s and appeared in international films such as Harry Black (1958), North West Frontier (1959), Lawrence of Arabia (1962) and Death on the Nile (1978), besides acting in Maya (1967), a US TV series. He also appeared in Punjabi films, including Chaddian Di Doli (1966), Nanak Nam Jahaz Hai (1969) with Prithviraj Kapoor, and Yamla Jatt with Helen.

I. S. Johar also wrote and directed films, including the partition-based Hindi movie Nastik (1954), Johar Mehmood in Goa and Johar Mehmood in Hong Kong, in which he co-starred with comedian Mehmood. These were inspired by comedy films of the Bob Hope-Bing Crosby style Road to... series. Johar was a unique and idiosyncratic individual, a lifelong liberal who poked fun at institutionalised self-satisfied smugness – an attitude which did not endear him to the essentially hierarchical and conservative Indian establishment, and led to difficulties finding finance for his unconventional screenplays. In many of his films, both those he directed and those he acted in, Sonia Sahni was the leading lady, most notably in Johar Mehmood in Goa, 1964.

He also starred in films with his own surname in the title such as Mera Naam Johar, Johar in Kashmir and Johar in Bombay, which is a testament both to his immense egotism, as well as his popularity with the common masses – for whom a movie with the Johar name was a guarantee of easy laughs, as well as subtle ironic or frankly sarcastic jibes at Indian customs, mores, superstitions and institutions. His film Nasbandi (Vasectomy) was a spoof on Prime Minister Indira Gandhi's failed policy of population control by coerced vasectomies during the period of Emergency and was "banned" when it was first released. In the plays written by him too, Johar attacks those in power. In a play on Bhutto, he writes about Pakistan's Prime Minister Zulfiqar Ali Bhutto as well as Gen Mohammed Zia-ul-Haq. Yash Chopra started his film career as an assistant director with I. S. Johar.

In 1963 he starred as "Gopal" in two Italian films directed by Mario Camerini: Kali Yug: Goddess of Vengeance and The Mystery of the Indian Temple.

== Personal life ==
Johar married Ramma Hoon in 1943 in Lahore. The couple became parents to two children, a son named Anil and a daughter named Neelam, who adopted the stage name Ambika Johar. Both his children worked in a handful of films in the late 1970s, including Nasbandi (1978) and 5 Rifles. Ramma herself acted in small roles in a couple of films, most notably as Balraj Sahni's cunning sister in Garam Hawa.

Johar and Ramma were divorced; theirs was one of the earliest legal divorces in the country. After this divorce, Johar married and divorced no less than four more women (five marriages in all, and as many divorces). One of his later wives was the actress Sonia Sahni, who had made her film debut in Johar's production Johar-Mehmood in Goa (1965). None of Johar's later marriages resulted in children.

== Death ==
He died in Bombay, on 10 March 1984.

== Awards and nominations ==
Year	Award	Category	Film	Result
1959	British Academy Film Awards	Best British Actor	Harry Black	Nominated
1971	Filmfare Awards	Best Performance in a Comic Role	Johny Mera Naam	Won
1974	Filmfare Awards	Best Performance in a Comic Role	Aaj Ki Taaza Khabar	Nominated

== Filmography ==
=== As an actor ===
- Ek Thi Ladki (1949) - Sohan
- Ek Teri Nishani (1949)
- Dholak (1951) story only didn't act
- Shrimati Ji (1952) - Chhoturam
- Nagin (1954)
- Shart (1954) - Hiten
- Nastik (1954) - Joker
- Durgesh Nandini (1956)
- Ham Sab Chor Hain (1956) - Kadkaram / Shuddhram / Sohrab / D'Souza / Kalidas / Tomson / Ayyar / Madam Kadki / Daleelchand Daleel
- Miss India (1957) - Pyarelal
- Kitna Badal Gaya Insaan (1957)
- Ek Gaon Ki Kahani (1957) - Gokul
- Harry Black (1958) - Bapu
- North West Frontier (1959) - Gupta
- Goonj Uthi Shehnai (1959) - Kanhaiya
- Bewaqoof (1960) - Johar
- Billo (1961) as Baunrar Mal (Punjabi movie)
- Aplam Chaplam (1961)
- Mr. India (1961) - Gullu Lala / Jung Bahadur
- Lawrence of Arabia (1962) - Gasim
- Main Shadi Karne Chala (1962)
- Ma Beta (1962) - Bishan Sahay
- Banarsi Thug (1962) - lBanarasi Prasad
- Kali Yug: Goddess of Vengeance (1963) - Gopal
- The Mystery of the Indian Temple (1963) - Gopal
- April Fool (1964) - Advocate Brijlal Sinha
- Johar-Mehmood in Goa (1965) - Ram
- Teen Devian (1965) - I.S. Johar
- Namaste Ji (1965)
- Bheegi Raat (1965) - Acharyaa Jhootlingam
- Main Wohi Hoon (1966) - Ashok
- Chaddian Di Doli (1966) - Hero
- Maya (1966) - One-Eye
- Ladka Ladki (1966) - Jagmohan / Chakor
- Johar in Kashmir (1966) - Aslam Abdul Samdani
- Dil Ne Phir Yaad Kiya (1966) - Bhagwan
- Akalmand (1966)
- Johar in Bombay (1967) - Rajesh
- Shagird (1967) - Prof. Brij Mohan Agnihotri 'Birju'
- Raaz (1967) - Rakharam Singh 'Rocky'
- Anita (1967) - Pramanand Marayan
- Shrimanji (1968) - Johar M. Gupta / Pran
- Mera Naam Johar (1968) - 008 / Johar Das
- Haye Mera Dil (1968) - Sokhanlal
- Nanak Naam Jahaz Hai (1969) - Shuka
- Pavitra Paapi (1970) - Adarshan Lala
- Do Thug (1970)
- Johny Mera Naam (1970) - Pehle Ram (Palmist) / Dooja Ram / Teeja Ram
- Mera Naam Joker (1970) - (uncredited)
- Safar (1970) - Kalidas
- Puraskar (1970) - Sumesh
- Aag Aur Daag (1970) - Murli - Taxi-driver
- Albela (1971)
- Chhoti Bahu (1971) - Premnath (Niku's dad)
- Thi Reeta (1971)
- Johar Mehmood in Hong Kong (1971) - Ramesh / Prince Pagadandi
- Jai Bangladesh (1971)
- Dost Aur Dushman (1971)
- Maalik Tere Bande Hum (1972)
- Doctor X (1972)
- Dastaan (1972) - Johar aka Birbal
- Roop Tera Mastana (1972) - Driver
- Gomti Ke Kinare (1972) - Seth Chellamal
- Tangewala (1972) - Nagina
- Banarasi Babu (1973) - Jackpot
- Joshila (1973) - Raunaq Singh
- Teen Chor (1973)
- Kashmakash (1973) - Private Detective Johar
- Intezaar (1973)
- Ek Mutthi Aasmaan (1973) - Pandit Kishorilal Sharma
- Aaj Ki Taaza Khabar (1973) - Ramji
- Trimurti (1974) - Shadilal
- 5 Rifles (1974) - Harfan Mama
- Prem Shastra (1974) - Malhotra
- Do Nambar Ke Amir (1974) - Mr. Johar
- Do Aankhen (1974)
- Badhti Ka Naam Daadhi (1974)
- Maze Le Lo (1975)
- Zinda Dil (1975) - Pinto D'Souza / Daya Shankar
- Sankoch (1976) - Sangeet Samrat
- Khalifa (1976) - Diwan Manoharlal Agnihotri
- Yamla Jatt (1976) - Yamla Jatt
- Mazdoor Zindabaad (1976) - Kansraj (uncredited)
- Aaj Ka Ye Ghar (1976) - Painter
- Saheb Bahadur (1977) - Prof. Rampyare
- Jagriti (1977)
- Ek Aurat Do Joote (1978)
- Nasbandi (1978) - Himself
- Ganga Ki Saugandh (1978) - Birju Master
- Priyatama (1978) - Lawyer
- Death on the Nile (1978) - Mr. Choudhury, Manager of the Karnak
- Premi Gangaram (1978)
- Ek Baap Chhe Bete (1978) - B.R.Choranjia
- Guru Ho Jaa Shuru (1979) - Curator D'Costa
- Ranjha Ikk Tey Heeran Do (1979) - Tota Ram
- Ramu To Diwana Hai (1980)
- Beqasoor (1980) - Private Detective Dinanath
- Do Premee (1980) - Daulatram
- Be-Reham (1980) - Police Inspector Malpani
- Sanjh Ki Bela (1980)
- Raaz (1981)
- Do Posti (1981) - Makhan
- Guru Suleman Chela Pahelwan (1981) - Dharmatma
- Gopichand Jasoos (1982) - Ram Rokada / No. 256
- Teesri Aankh (1982) - Mirchandani
- Heeron Ka Chor (1982)
- Bad Aur Badnam (1984) - Malpani (uncredited) (final film role)

=== As a director ===
Director
Year	Film	Producer	Story	Screenplay	Dialogue	Note
1952	Shrimati Ji		Self	Self		
1954	Nastik		Self	Self		
1955	Shri Nagad Narayan					
1956	Ham Sab Chor Hain		Self			
1957	Kitna Badal Gaya Insaan				Self	
1957	Miss India (1957)		Self	Self	Self	
1960	Bewaqoof	Self	Self	Self	Self	
1965	Johar-Mehmood in Goa	Self				
1966	Johar in Kashmir	Self	Self	Self.	Self.	
1971	Jai Bangladesh	Self	Self	Self.	Self.	
1974	5 Rifles	Self	Self	Self.	Self.	
1978	Nasbandi	Self	Self	Self.	Self.	
