= Lakshmanrekha =

- Directed by: Sunil Sikand
- Written by: Karan Razdan
- Produced by: Pran; Satyendra Pal
- Starring: Naseeruddin Shah; Jackie Shroff; Sangeeta Bijlani; Shilpa Shirodkar
- Cinematography: V. Durga Prasad
- Edited by: Vinod Nayak; Prashant Khedekar
- Music by: Laxmikant–Pyarelal
- Release date: 27 December 1991
- Country: India
- Language: Hindi

Lakshmanrekha is a 1991 Indian Hindi-language film directed by Sunil Sikand and produced by Pran & Satyendra Pal. The film stars Naseeruddin Shah, Jackie Shroff, Sangeeta Bijlani, Shilpa Shirodkar in the lead roles, Danny Denzongpa as the main antagonist, with Raza Murad, Shammi Kapoor, Om Prakash, Pran in other important roles. Laxmikant-Pyarelal composed the music for the film.

== Cast ==
- Naseeruddin Shah as Amar Sharma
- Jackie Shroff as Vikram Sharma "Vicky"
- Sangeeta Bijlani as Beenu
- Shilpa Shirodkar as Vaishali
- Raza Murad as DCP Pandey
- Danny Denzongpa as Birju
- Shammi Kapoor as Baba Sahib
- Om Prakash as Gafoor Bhai
- Pran as Kishanlal Sharma
- Anil Kumar

== Plot ==
Amar Sharma (Naseeruddin Shah) and Vicky (Jackie Shroff) are two close friends. Amar is a police inspector, but Vicky is a career criminal, who has no respect for the law. But fate has a bitter twist for Amar, when his dad, Kishanlal Sharma (Pran) is killed right in front of his eyes by Birju (Danny Denzongpa) and he is unable to convict and imprison Birju, due to false alibis. Amar attempts to avenge his dad's death by attempting to kill Birju on his yacht, but is severely beaten, tossed overboard, and left for dead. He survives and returns to finish his job, only to be confronted by Vicky, who is now a police inspector, and will not permit Amar to take the law in his own hands.

== Songs ==
The songs are written by Anand Bakshi and composed by Laxmikant–Pyarelal.

Song	Singer
"Yeh Sitam"	Asha Bhosle
"Kismat Khul Gayi"	Amit Kumar
"Kya Gaadi Hai"	Amit Kumar, Alka Yagnik
"Yeh Zindagi Hai"	Mohammed Aziz, Alka Yagnik
