= Pran (actor) =

Indian actor (1920–2013)

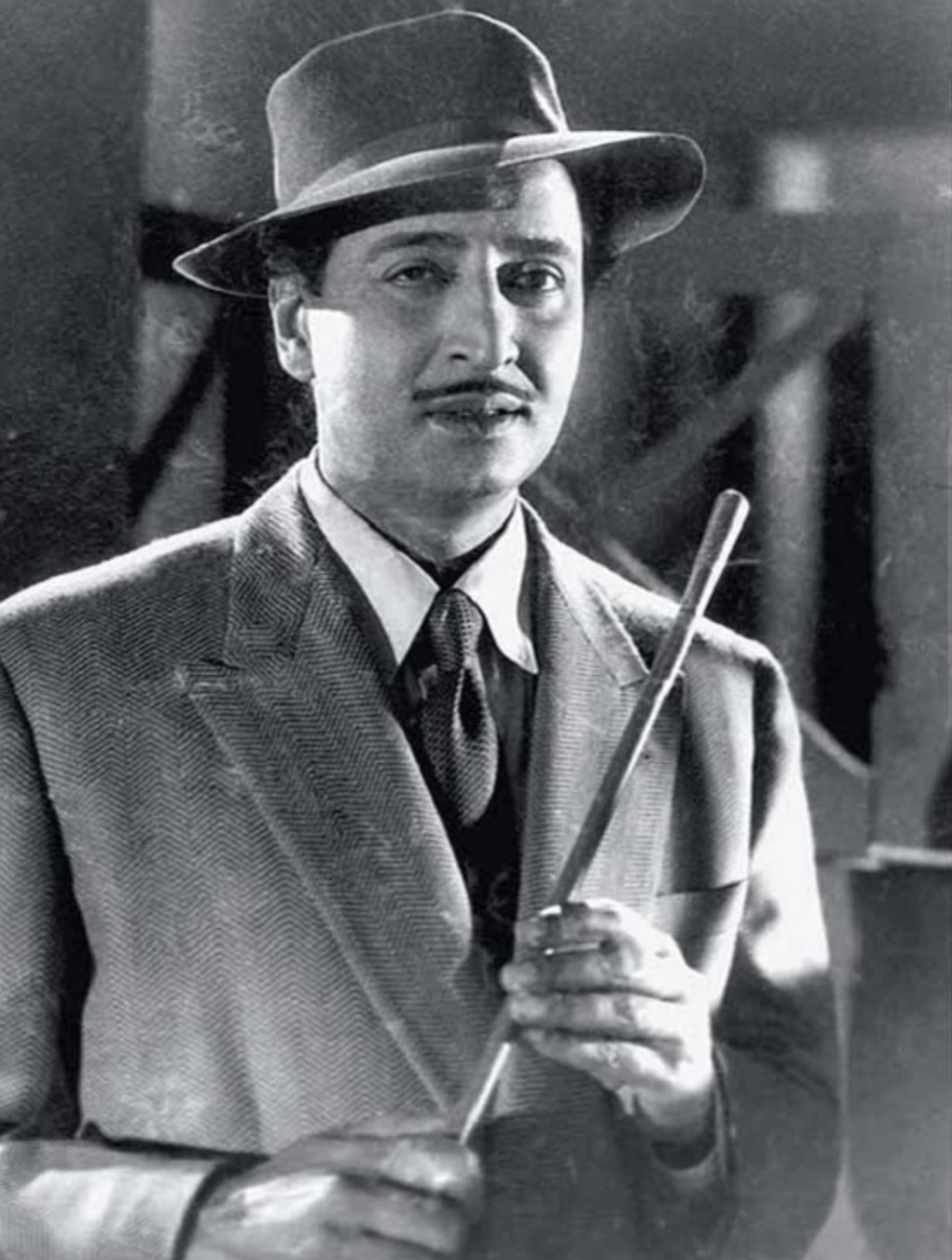
- Publicity still of Pran
- Born: Pran Krishan Sikand; 12 February 1920; Lahore, British India (present-day Pakistan)
- Died: 12 July 2013 (aged 93); Mumbai, Maharashtra, India
- Occupation: Actor
- Years active: 1940–2007
- Works: Filmography
- Spouse: Shukla Ahluwalia (m. 1945)
- Children: 3 (including Sunil Sikand)
- Awards: 3 Filmfare Awards for Best Supporting Actor
- Honours: Padma Bhushan (2001); Dadasaheb Phalke Award (2013)
- Website: pransikand.com

Pran Krishan Sikand (pronounced [pra:n]; 12 February 1920 – 12 July 2013), better known mononymously as Pran, was an Indian actor who worked in Hindi cinema. He was one of the most successful and respected actors in the history of Indian cinema; in a career spanning over six decades he was also one of the highest-paid actors of his time.

Pran was in/famous for his villain roles, and a highly regarded character actor in Bollywood from the 1940s to the 1990s. He played heroes from 1940 to 1947, negative roles from 1942 to 1991, and supporting and character roles from 1967 to 2007. From the late 1940s through the 70s was the peak of Pran's career as a villain, especially in the 1950s and 60s: his interpretations were the first true personification of "evil" on the Indian screen, and the intensity of his portrayals of negative/villainous characters was such that the given name "Pran" fell into disuse.

In a long and prolific career, Pran appeared in over 362 films. He played the leading man in Khandaan (1942), Pilpili Saheb (1954) and Halaku (1956), and was known for his roles in Madhumati (1958), Jis Desh Mein Ganga Behti Hai (1960), Shaheed (1965), Upkar (1967), Ram Aur Shyam (1967), Aansoo Ban Gaye Phool (1969), Purab Aur Paschim (1970), Johny Mera Naam (1970), Victoria No. 203 (1972), Be-Imaan (1972), Zanjeer (1973), Majboor (1974), Amar Akbar Anthony (1977), Don (1978), Sharaabi (1984) and Duniya (1984).

Pran received many #Awards and honours in his career, including the Filmfare Award for Best Supporting Actor in 1967, 1969 and 1972, and was awarded the Filmfare Special Award in 1997. He was named "Villain of the Millennium" by Stardust Awards in 2000. The Government of India honoured him with the Padma Bhushan Award in 2001 for his contributions to the arts. He was honoured in 2013 with the Dadasaheb Phalke Award, the highest national award for cinema artists, by the Government of India. In 2010, he was named on the list of CNN's Top 25 Asian actors of all time.

Pran died on 12 July 2013 at the age of 93 at Mumbai's Lilavati Hospital and Research Centre after suffering a prolonged illness.

== Early life and education ==
Pran was born on 12 February 1920 in Lahore, into a wealthy Punjabi Hindu family but raised in Ballimaran of Old Delhi in Delhi. His father, Lala Kewal Krishan Sikand, was a civil engineer and a government civil contractor; his mother was Rameshwari. Pran was one of seven children; four sons and three daughters.

Pran was academically gifted, especially in mathematics. His father had a transferable job, and so Pran studied in various places, including Dehradun, Lahore, Kapurthala, Meerut and Unnao (Uttar Pradesh), finally completing his matriculation from Hamid School, in Rampur (U.P.). After that, he joined A. Das & Co., Delhi as an apprentice to become a professional photographer. He travelled to Shimla and played Sita in a local staging of "Ramlila". Madan Puri enacted the role of Rama in this play.

== Career ==
=== Early career (1940–1967) ===
Pran got his first role in Dalsukh M. Pancholi's Punjabi film Yamla Jat (1940) because of an accidental meeting with writer Wali Mohammad Wali at a shop in Lahore. Directed by Moti B. Gidwani, the film featured Noor Jehan and Durga Khote. This was followed by small roles in the film Chaudhary and Khazanchi, both in 1941. Pancholi cast him again in Khandaan (1942), which was Pran's first Hindi-language film. It featured him as a romantic hero, opposite Noor Jehan, who had acted with him in Yamla Jat as a child artist. In Khandaan, she was under 15 years old and compensated for the difference in their heights in close-up shots by standing on top of bricks. In the pre-independence era, director Gidwani cast Pran in more films like Kaise Kahoon (1945) and Khamosh Nigahen (1946).

Pran had acted in 22 films from 1942 to 1946 in Lahore; 18 were released by 1947. Due to India's partition in 1947, his career had a brief break. His films from 1944 to 1947 were made in undivided India, but Taraash (1951) and Khanabadosh (1952) (both co-starring Manorama) were released only in Pakistan after Partition. He left Lahore and arrived in Bombay. For a few months, he looked for acting opportunities while doing other jobs. He worked in Delmar Hotel, Marine Drive for eight months, after which he got a chance to act in 1948.

Because of help from writer Saadat Hasan Manto and actor Shyam, he got a role in the Bombay Talkies' film, Ziddi which starred Dev Anand and Kamini Kaushal and was directed by Shaheed Latif. The movie launched Pran's career in Bombay. Incidentally, it proved to be Dev Anand's big break as a hero. By 1950 he had been gradually established as a premier villain in Hindi cinema. Within a week of Ziddi's success, he had signed three more films – S M Yusuf's Grihasti (1948), which became a diamond jubilee hit, Prabhat Films's Apradhi (1949) and Wali Mohammad's Putli (1949). By then, Wali Mohammad, who was responsible for Pran's first role, had come to Bombay and became a producer, setting up an office at Famous Studios, near Mahalaxmi Racecourse. In the 1940s, romantic duets featuring him, like the songs "Tere Naaz Uthane Ko Jee Chahta Hai" from Grihasti, opposite Shardha, and from Khandaan (1942), with Noor Jehan, became popular in the 1940s. The way he expressed his dialogues in films such as Sheesh Mahal (1950), a series of disguises he made in Adalat (1958), and the rapport he shared with vamps like Kuldip Kaur in Jashan (1955) showcased his versatility in the 1950s.

As a villain, Pran's initial successful films were Ziddi and Bari Behan (1949). Pran's trademark blowing of smoke rings first appeared in the latter film. He was regularly offered the role of the main villain or of a negative character in films with Dilip Kumar, Dev Anand and Raj Kapoor as the lead hero in the 1950s and 60s. From the 1950s directors like M. V. Raman, Nanabhai Bhatt, Kalidas, Ravindra Dave, I. S. Johar and Bimal Roy repeatedly cast him. Similarly in the 1960s, he was frequently in the directorial ventures of A. Bhim Singh, Shakti Samanta, Bhappi Sonie, K. Amarnath, Nasir Hussain and others. In the 1970s, newer, younger directors and producers cast him in their films even though Pran asked for the highest price among supporting actors from 1968 to 1982.

Pran's performance as the negative character was appreciated especially in Dilip Kumar starrers such as Azaad (1955), Devdas (1955), Madhumati (1958), Dil Diya Dard Liya (1966), Ram Aur Shyam (1967) and Aadmi (1968); and films with Dev Anand as the lead man such as Ziddi (1948), Munimji (1955), Amar Deep (1958), Jab Pyar Kisi Se Hota Hai (1961); and with Raj Kapoor in Aah (1953), Chori Chori (1956), Jagte Raho (1956), Chhalia (1960), Jis Desh Mein Ganga Behti Hai (1960) and Dil Hi Toh Hai (1963). Films with him as the lead hero, Pilpili Saheb (1954) and then Halaku in 1956, were big hits too. He had roles in several genres, like as a pirate in Sindbad the Sailor (1952) and Daughter of Sindbad (1958); in action-packed thrillers like Azad (1955); historicals like Aan (1952) and Raj Tilak (1958); social themes like Baradari (1955); and light romances like Munimji (1955) and Asha (1957). In the 1960s and early 1970s, despite being in his 40s, he continued to play pivotal roles as a character in the age range of 25 to 30 in films with Shammi Kapoor, Joy Mukherjee, Rajendra Kumar and Dharmendra as the lead heroes. From the early 1950s to the early 1970s, Pran gained particular notoriety due to his frequent roles as a villain. From 1964, with Pooja Ke Phool and Kashmir Ki Kali, he also brought a comical side to his negative characters. While Dilip Kumar and Raj Kapoor's careers as the young hero started to decline in the late 1960s and Rajendra Kumar and Shammi Kapoor stopped playing the lead by 1973, Pran continued with his roles. His association with Dev Anand, begun in 1948, continued even during the 1970s and the 1980s with Johny Mera Naam (1970), Yeh Gulistan Hamara (1972), Joshila (1973), Warrant (1975) and Des Pardes (1978).

Pran played roles in comedy films starring Kishore Kumar and Mehmood Ali in the lead. His collaborations with Mehmood include Sadhu Aur Shaitaan (1968), Lakhon Me Ek (1971) and with Kishore Kumar include Chham Chhama Chham (1952), Aasha (1957), Bewaqoof (1960), Half Ticket (1962) and Man-Mauji (1962).

=== Later career (1967−retirement) ===
In the late 1960s, Pran played Malang Chacha, a veteran war hero, in Manoj Kumar's film Upkar (1967). The Kalyanji Anandji song "Kasme Waade Pyaar Wafaa" was picturised on him. In this film, Pran played a more sympathetic role. He received his first Filmfare Award for Upkar. Kumar continued to cast him in pivotal roles in films such as Purab Aur Paschim (1970), Be-Imaan (1972), Sanyasi (1975) and Dus Numbri (1976).

From 1967 onward he also acted in Bengali films, beginning with Ashim Banerjee's Sonai Dighe, where Joy Mukherjee was the hero.

Pran played the supporting role in several of these, which replaced his image as the villain with that of a character actor. After 1969, he was offered the lead role in films like Nanha Farishta (1969), Jangal Mein Mangal (1972), Dharma (1973), Ek Kunwari Ek Kunwara (1973) and Rahu Ketu (1978).

Pran and Ashok Kumar were very close friends in professional and real life. They acted in 27 films together from 1951 to 1987 starting with Afsana (1951). Their other films include Mr. X (1957), Adhikar (1971), Victoria No. 203 (1972), Chori Mera Kaam (1975) and Raja Aur Rana (1984). Sung by Kishore Kumar, the songs "Hum Bolega To Bologe Ke Bolta Hai" from Kasauti (1974) and "Micheal Daru Peeke Dandha Kartha Hai" from Majboor (1974), picturised on Pran, were very popular.

From 1969 to 1982, Pran was one of the highest-paid actors in Bollywood. He played the lead role in the film Aurat (1967) paired opposite Padmini, with Rajesh Khanna in a supporting role. Pran and Khanna worked in five more films — Maryada (1971), Jaanwar (1983), Souten (1983), Bewafai (1985) and Durgaa (1985). In 1973, he recommended Amitabh Bachchan to Prakash Mehra for the character of Vijay in Zanjeer, a role earlier offered to Dev Anand and Dharmendra. Pran's role as Sher Khan, with his red wig and beard and Pathan I style was well appreciated. Pran acted with Bachchan in about 14 films with notable ones being Zanjeer (1973), Majboor (1974), Don (1978), Amar Akbar Anthony (1977), Dostana (1980), Kaalia (1981), Naseeb (1981) and Sharaabi (1984).

Pran occasionally accepted antagonistic roles from 1971 to 1992. He appeared as a villain in films like Maryada, Naya Zamana, Jawan Muhabat, Aan Baan, Roop Tera Mastana, Yeh Gulistan Hamara, Gaddar, Rahu Ketu, Andha Kanoon (1983), Duniya (1984), Insaaf Kaun Karega, Durgaa, Bewafai, Hoshiyar, Dharm Adhikari and Azaad Desh Ke Ghulam. Pran had dual roles in Khoon Ka Rishta, Insaaf and Jangal Mein Mangal.

He produced the movie Lakshmanrekha in 1991, the only one he produced in his Bollywood career, and played Kishan Lal Sharma in the movie.

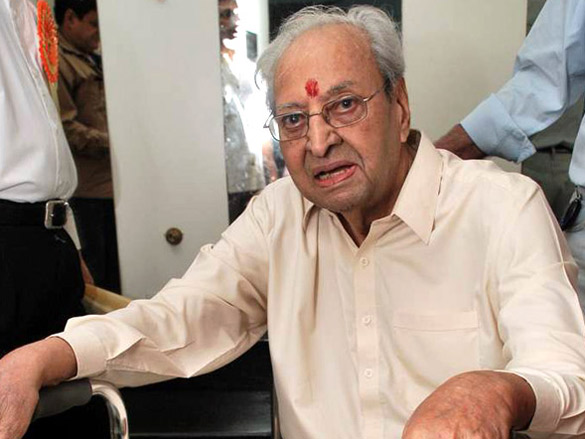
Pran at his 90th birthday in 2010.

In 1998, at the age of 78, Pran suffered a heart attack, after which he started rejecting film offers due to age-related problems. But in the 1990s, Amitabh Bachchan requested Pran to do roles in his home productions Tere Mere Sapne (1996) and Mrityudata (1997). Pran made an exception by acting in them to help Bachchan through a difficult time in his career. In 1997, his character in Mrityudaata was modified to compensate for Pran's shaking legs in real life and in Tere Mere Sapne, his shots were taken with him seated. After 2000, he made a few guest appearances.

== Personal life ==
Pran married Shukla Sikand (née Ahluwalia; 1 October 1924 – 26 March 2016) on 18 April 1945 and has two sons, Arvind (born 11 August 1946) and Sunil (born 19 September 1949), and a daughter Pinky (born 1953).

== Illness and death ==
He was treated at the Lilavati Hospital and died on 12 July 2013 at the age of 93. He had been admitted to hospital a few times in the last few months for deteriorating health; at some point he was battling pneumonia. Pran's death was widely noted by statesmen and his fellow entertainers. Prime Minister Manmohan Singh paid his condolences on his death and called him "an icon". Veteran actor Amitabh Bachchan tweeted his feelings about his death calling him a "magnificent pillar" of the film industry.

== Legacy ==
Pran had a six-decade career in Hindi cinema and is one of the most celebrated actors in the industry. His acting is said to have been effective enough to desist people from naming their children "Pran" because of his negative roles, while the industry had started calling him "Pran Sahab". His favourite line "Barkhurdaar" became immensely popular. In fact he was paid more than most male leads of his time, often most people would go to watch movies to only watch Pran.

In 2000, Bunny Reuben, a film journalist, authored a biography on Pran, titled "...and Pran". The name of this book arises from the fact that in the majority of Pran's movies, his name was credited in the last after all the other actors, "....and Pran". His biography, "...and Pran", was a tribute to about 250 of his 350 movies that had his name at the end of the credits, usually with the words "...and Pran" and sometimes "...above all, Pran". In 2012, he gave his handprint for "Legend's Walk", a waterfront promenade in Bandra. In 2022, Pran was placed in Outlook India's "75 Best Bollywood Actors" list.

== Filmography ==
Source: Official website. See also articles on individual films.

== Awards and honours ==
Pran has been honoured with awards for his portrayal of negative characters. He has received three Filmfare Awards in the Best Supporting Actor category for Upkar, Aansoo Ban Gaye Phool and Be-Imaan. However, in 1973 when he was awarded for his role of constable Ram Singh in Be-Imaan, he refused to accept the award stating that the Filmfare Award for Best Music Director should have gone to Ghulam Mohammed for Pakeezah and not to the musical duo Shankar Jaikishan for Be-imaan. He was awarded three Bengal Film Journalists' Association Awards for his supporting roles.

For his vast contributions to Indian cinema, Pran has been honoured with Lifetime Achievement awards, including those of Filmfare, Star Screen Awards and Zee Cine Awards. In 2001, the Government of India conferred the Padma Bhushan on him. In April 2013, he was announced to be the winner of the Dadasaheb Phalke Award, the most prestigious award of Indian cinema, presented by the Government of India. The award was presented to him at the 60th National Film Awards for his lifetime of work in the film industry. He could not attend the 60th National Film Awards in May 2013 where he was to be presented the Dadasaheb Phalke Award. Instead, Information and Broadcasting minister Manish Tewari presented the award at Pran's home in Mumbai. Celebrities congratulated him on this occasion with Amitabh Bachchan calling him "a large pillar of the Indian Film Industry" on Twitter. He was a contender of the award for the previous year with Manoj Kumar and Vyjayanthimala, but Soumitra Chatterjee was chosen as the awardee.

=== Civilian Award ===
- 2001 – Padma Bhushan, India's third highest civilian award from the Government of India.

=== National Film Awards ===
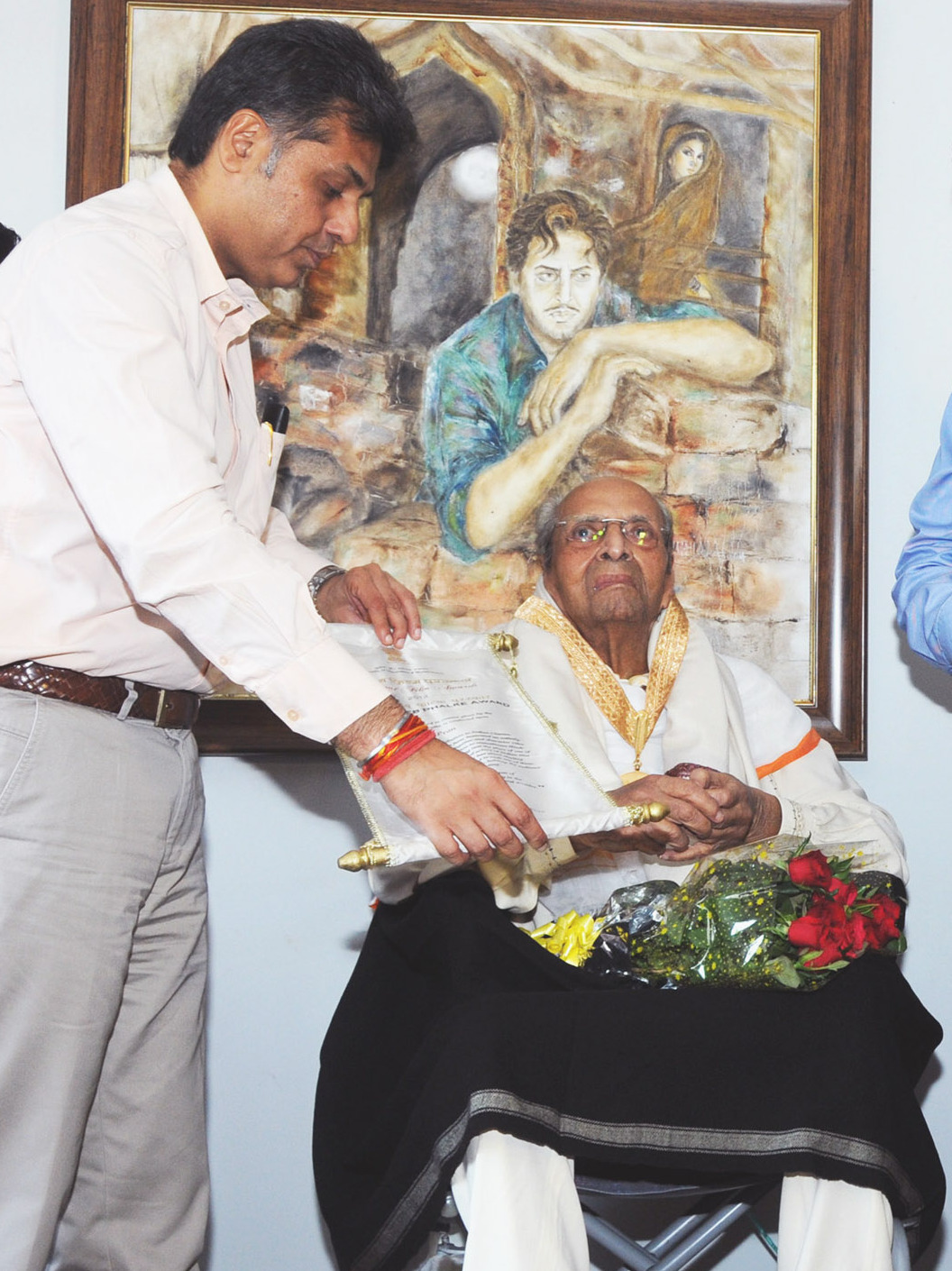
Pran being felicitated with Dadasaheb Phalke award at his residence on 5 August 2011.

- 2013 – Dadasaheb Phalke Award, India's highest national award for cinema artists, presented by the Government of India, for lifetime achievement.

=== Filmfare Awards ===
- 1967 – Best Supporting Actor for Upkar
- 1969 – Best Supporting Actor for Aansoo Ban Gaye Phool
- 1972 – Best Supporting Actor for Be-Imaan
- 1997 – Special Award

=== Bengal Film Journalists' Association Awards ===
- 1961 – Best Actor in a Supporting Role: Jis Desh Men Ganga Behti Hai
- 1966 – Best Actor in a Supporting Role: Shaheed
- 1973 – Best Actor in a Supporting Role: Zanjeer

=== Other awards and recognitions ===
- 1972–73 – Chitrlok Cine Circle Ahmedabad: "Best Character Artiste Award".
- 1975–76 – Bombay Film Award: Most Versatile Actor.
- 1977–78 – Bombay Film Award: Most Versatile Actor.
- 1978 – North Bombay Jaycees: Best Character Actor.
- 1984 – "Extra Ordinary Special Award as Wizard of Acting" by Bombay Film Award.
- 1984 – Filmgoers Award: Reigning "Abhinay Samrat".
- 1985 – Kala Bhushan Award presented by Punjabi Kala Sangam.
- 1987 – North Bombay Jaycees: Outstanding Performance of Decade.
- "Viyayshree Award" presented for Enriching Human Life and Outstanding Attainments India Int. Friendship Society).
- "Ars Gratia Artis" for excellence in emotive Art.
- 1990 – Kala Rattan Award presented by Punjabi Kal Sangam for 50 glorious Years.
- 1990 – Punjab Association: an Award for 50 years in the Industry.
- 1990 – Southall Lion's Club London: "In recognition of Invaluable Services to Charity at the Celebration of Golden Jubilee of his services to the Film Industry.
- 1991 – Cinegoers Award: "Abhinay Samrat Golden Jubilee Award".
- 1992 – Outstanding contribution to Indian Film Industry, Indian Motion Pictures Producers' Association.
- 2000 – Screen Lifetime Achievement Award
- 2000 – Zee Cine Award for Lifetime Achievement
- 2000 – "Villain of the Millennium" by the Stardust Awards.
- 2004 – Lifetime Achievement Award instituted by the Maharashtra Government.
