= Hema Malini filmography =

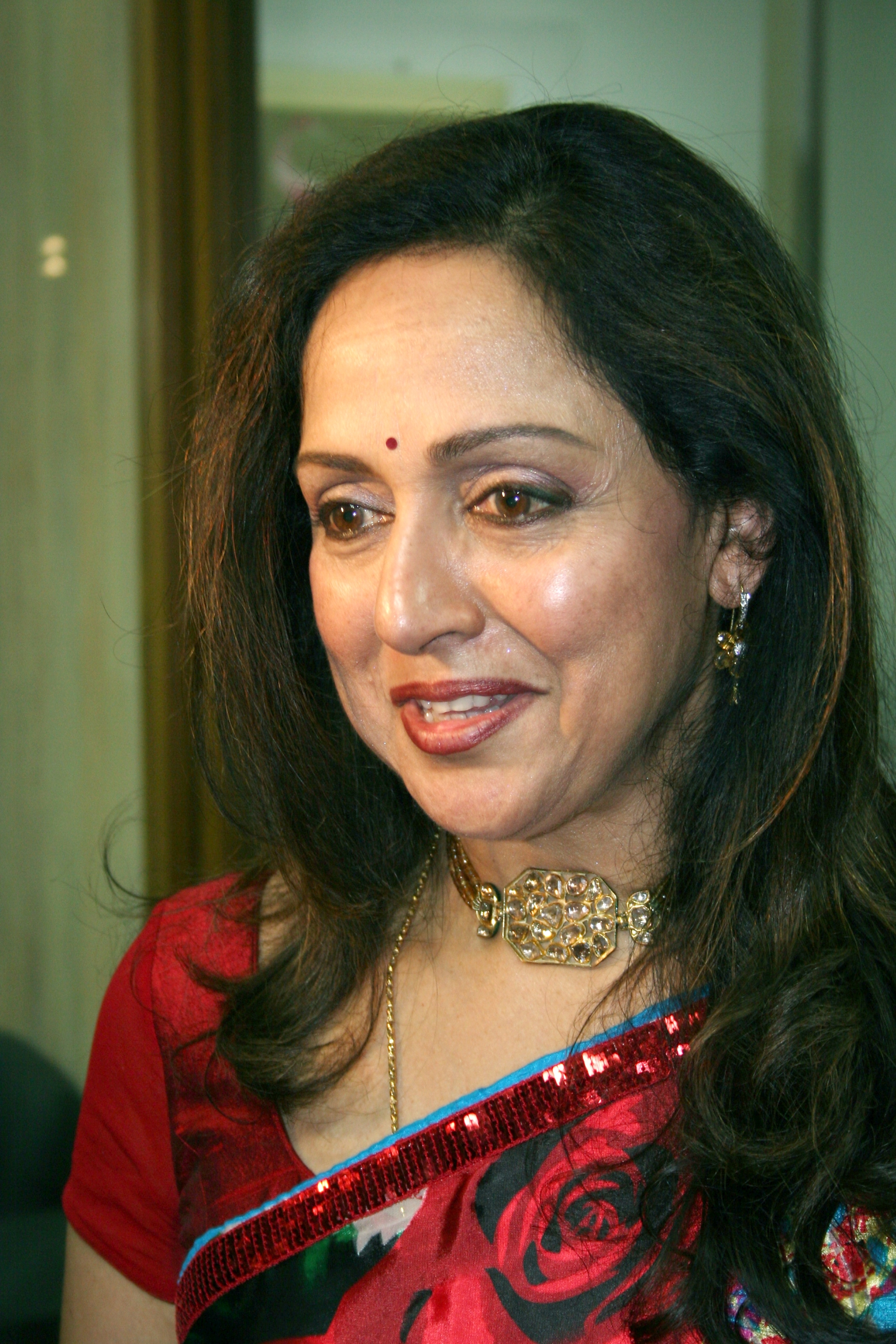
Hema Malini in 2007

Hema Malini, an Indian actress, has been part of over 152 projects, primarily in Hindi films.

== Films ==
=== As actress ===
- Note: All films are in Hindi unless otherwise stated.

Year	Film	Role	Notes	Ref.
1963	Idhu Sathiyam	Dancer	Tamil film	
1965	Pandava Vanavasam	Dancer	Telugu film	
1968	Sapno Ka Saudagar	Mahi		
1969	Waris	Geeta		
1969	Jahan Pyar Miley	Veena		
1970	Tum Haseen Main Jawaan	Anuradha		
1970	Sharafat	Chandni		
1970	Abhinetri	Anjana		
1970	Aansoo Aur Muskan	Radha/Girja (Note: She played dual roles)		
1970	Johny Mera Naam	Rekha		
1971	Sri Krishna Vijayamu	Rambha	Telugu film; Cameo appearance	
1971	Paraya Dhan	Rajjoo (Rajni)		
1971	Naya Zamana	Seema Choudhury		
1971	Lal Patthar	Saudamani/Madhuri (Note: She played a single character who has two different names.)		
1971	Andaz	Sheetal		
1971	Tere Mere Sapne	Maltimala	Special appearance	
1972	Seeta Aur Geeta	Seeta/Geeta		
1972	Raja Jani	Shanno		
1972	Gora Aur Kala	Rajkumari Anuradha Singh		
1972	Bhai Ho To Aisa	Roopa		
1972	Babul Ki Galiyaan	Sharda		
1972	Garam Masala	Didi	Cameo appearance	
1973	Shareef Budmaash	Seema		
1973	Prem Parvat	Herself	Cameo appearance	
1973	Chhupa Rustam	Ritu R. Jain		
1973	Gehri Chaal	Hema		
1973	Jugnu	Seema		
1973	Joshila	Shalini		
1974	Dulhan	Radha		
1974	Amir Garib	Sunita/Soni		
1974	Dost	Kaajal 'Kaju'		
1974	Prem Nagar	Lata		
1974	Kasauti	Sapna		
1974	Patthar Aur Payal	Sapna Sinha		
1974	Haath Ki Safai	Kamini Chopra		
1975	Sunehra Sansar	Savita/Rani Padmavati		
1975	Sanyasi	Aarti/Champa		
1975	Kahte Hain Mujhko Raja	Courtesan		
1975	Do Thug	Reena		
1975	Dharmatma	Reshma		
1975	Khushboo	Kusum		
1975	Pratigya	Radha Rani		
1975	Sholay	Basanti		
1976	Sharafat Chod Di Maine	Preeta/Geeta		
1976	Naach Uthe Sansaar	Nanki Mehto		
1976	Maa	Nimmi		
1976	Charas	Sudha		
1976	Aap Beati	Geeta K. Kapoor		
1976	Dus Numbri	Sundari/Rosemary Fernandes		
1976	Mehbooba	Ratna/Jhumri		
1976	Jaaneman	Santo/Banto		
1977	Shirdi Ke Sai Baba	Pooja	Special appearance	
1977	Kinara	Aarti Sanyal		
1977	Khel Khilari Ka	Shaki's Lutera's fan	Guest appearance	
1977	Dream Girl	Sapna/Padma/Champabai/Dream Girl/Rajkumari (Note: She played single character with different names)		
1977	Dhoop Chhaon	Lajwanti "Lajjo"		
1977	Chacha Bhatija	Mala		
1977	Palkon Ki Chhaon Mein	Mohini		
1978	Dillagi	Phoolrenu		
1978	Azaad	Rajkumari Seema		
1978	Apna Khoon	Geeta		
1978	Trishul	Sheetal Varma		
1979	Ratnadeep			
1979	Janta Hawaldar	Seema		
1979	Dil Kaa Heera	Roopa / Parirani		
1979	Meera	Meera Rathod		
1979	Hum Tere Aashiq Hain	Ramkali		
1980	The Burning Train	Seema		
1980	Bandish	Madhu/Chanchal		
1980	Do Aur Do Paanch	Shalu		
1980	Alibaba Aur 40 Chor	Marjina		
1981	Maan Gaye Ustaad	Munni/Geeta Singh/Princess Shabnam		
1981	Jyothi	Gauri		
1981	Dard	Seema		
1981	Aas Paas	Seema		
1981	Krodhi	Phoolvati	Special appearance	
1981	Kranti	Rajkumari Meenakshi		
1981	Naseeb	Asha		
1981	Kudrat	Chandramukhi/Paro		
1981	Meri Aawaz Suno	Sunita Kumar		
1982	Samraat	Jenny		
1982	Farz Aur Kanoon	Bharati		
1982	Do Dishayen	Uma/Maya		
1982	Bhagawat	Rajkumari Padmavati		
1982	Satte Pe Satta	Indu R. Anand		
1982	Rajput	Janki		
1982	Desh Premee	Asha		
1982	Suraag	Herself	Cameo appearance	
1983	Taqdeer	Chandni		
1983	Razia Sultan	Razia Sultan		
1983	Andha Kanoon	Inspector Durga Devi Singh		
1983	Nastik	Gauri		
1983	Justice Chaudhury	Radha		
1984	Sharara	Double role		
1984	Ram Tera Desh	Sunita		
1984	Raaj Tilak	Roopa		
1984	Qaidi	Dr. Sunita		
1984	Ek Naya Itihas			
1984	Ek Nai Paheli	Singer Bhairavi		
1985	Phaansi Ke Baad	Sapna		
1985	Durga	Durga		
1985	Aandhi-Toofan	Sheela R. Singh		
1985	Ramkali	Raksha/Ramkali		
1985	Yudh	Nafisa Khatun	Special appearance	
1985	Hum Dono	Lata		
1985	Babu	Kammo		
1986	Ek Chadar Maili Si	Ranno Singh		
1987	Sitapur Ki Geeta	Geeta Singh		
1987	Hirasat			
1987	Apne Apne	Seema Kapoor	Special appearance	
1987	Anjaam	Rajeshwari Memsaab		
1987	Jaan Hatheli Pe	Mona Kapoor		
1987	Kudrat Ka Kanoon	Advocate Bharti Mathur		
1988	Vijay	Suman		
1988	Mulzim	Jailer Shardadevi		
1988	Mohabbat Ke Dushman	Shamajaan		
1988	Rihaee	Taku		
1989	Galiyon Ka Badshah	Billoo		
1989	Deshwasi	Bharati Singh		
1989	Sachche Ka Bol-Bala	Greta Saunders 'Geeta'	Special appearance	
1989	Santosh	Kavita		
1989	Samsara Sangeetham		Tamil film	
1989	Desh Ke Dushman	Inspector Kiran Gupta		
1989	Paap Ka Ant	Advocate Jyothi		
1989	Hum Mein Shahenshah Koun	TBA	Unreleased	
1990	Shadyantra			
1990	Lekin...	Tara	Guest appearance	
1990	Jamai Raja	Durgeshwari Devi		
1991	Hai Meri Jaan	Reshma		
1994	Vivekananda			
1995	Param Vir Chakra	Mother		
1996	Aatank	Jesu's girlfriend		
1996	Maahir	Mrs. Kamini Rai		
1996	Jai Kali Maa	Kali		
1997	Himalay Putra	Seema Malhotra		
1998	Swami Vivekananda	Bhavatarini		
2000	Hey Ram	Ambujam Iyengar	Billingual film	
2001	Censor	Radha		
2003	Baghban	Pooja Malhotra		
2004	Veer-Zaara	Saraswati "Maati" Kaur	Special appearance	
2005	Bhagmati	Dancer	Special appearance	
2006	Ganga	Savitri V. Singh	Bhojpuri film	
2006	Baabul	Shobhna Kapoor		
2007	Laaga Chunari Mein Daag	Dulari Bai (Dancer)	Guest appearance	
2007	Gangotri	Savitri V. Singh	Bhojpuri film	
2010	Sadiyaan	Benzir Shahabuddin		
2011	Bbuddah... Hoga Terra Baap	Sita Malhotra		
2011	Aarakshan	Shakunthala Thakral	Cameo appearance	
2011	Tell Me O Kkhuda	Susan D'Mello	Also director	
2013	Mahabharat Aur Barbareek	Hidimbi		
2016	Aman Ke Farishtey	Geeta		
2017	Gautamiputra Satakarni	Gautami Balashri	Telugu film	
2017	Ek Thi Rani Aisi Bhi	Vijaya Raje Scindia		
2020	Shimla Mirchi	Rukmini	Delayed release; Filmed in 2014	

=== As director ===
- Dil Aashna Hai (1992)
- Tell Me O Kkhuda (2011)

== Television ==
Year	Title	Role	Notes	Ref.
1986	Tera Panhey	Rani Padmini		
1989	Rangoli	Host/presenter		
1990	Noopur	Uma	Also director and producer	
1995	Mohini	—N/a	Director, television film	
1996–1997	Yug	Nirmala		
1996	Women of India	Amrapali	Also director and producer	
1999–2000	Jai Mata Di	Devi Durga		
2004–2005	Kamini Damini	Kamini/Damini		
2008–2009	Dancing Queen	Judge		
2010–2011	Matti Ki Banno	—N/a	Producer	

== Music videos ==
Year	Title	Performer	Ref.
1988	Mile Sur Mera Tumhara	Various	
2013	"Betiyaan" (Save the Girl Child)	Shankar Mahadevan, Sunidhi Chauhan, Sonu Nigam	
