= Hema Malini: Beyond the Dream Girl =

Biography by Ram Kamal Mukherjee

- Author: Ram Kamal Mukherjee
- Audio read by: Sumit Kaul
- Language: English
- Subject: Hema Malini
- Genre: Biography
- Published: 10 October 2017
- Publisher: HarperCollins
- Publication place: India
- Media type: Print
- Pages: 292
- ISBN: 978-93-52773-22-0

Hema Malini: Beyond the Dream Girl is a biography by the journalist and film director Ram Kamal Mukherjee, edited by Nooshin Mowla. Divided into 23 chapters, it chronicles Hema Malini's life and career. The book describes her background and personal life, including her birth in Ammankudi in 1948, her early years in New Delhi, her studies in Madras (now Chennai), and her marriage to the actor Dharmendra—with whom she has two daughters (including the actress Esha Deol)—in 1980. Her 50-year-long acting, dancing, filmmaking, magazine editing, and political career are also detailed. The book was published by HarperCollins on 10 October 2017.

Mukherjee first published Hema Malini: Diva Unveiled, a 2005 coffee table book on Malini that failed commercially and critically. It was followed by another book about the actress in 2007: Hema Malini: The Authorized Biography, by the film critic and journalist Bhawana Somaaya. Over the years, Mukherjee observed Malini's life and realised there are many aspects not chronicled in the previous books. Mukherjee approached her with the idea; she was initially hesitant of the project, entitled Hema Malini: Beyond the Dream Girl, but he promised it would detail all her life's aspects. Following its release, the book received widespread critical acclaim.

== Summary ==
Hema Malini: Beyond the Dream Girl is divided into twenty-three chapters.

The book opens with a foreword by the Prime Minister of India Narendra Modi, speaking of his excitement about the publishing of the biography, and an introduction from the author, Ram Kamal Mukherjee. It later chronicles Hema Malini's early life, starting with her birth on the midnight of 15 October 1948 in Ammankudi to a religious, traditional Iyengar family. Her father, Vengarai Srisailesha Rangaramanuja Chakravarti, was the regional director of the Employees' State Insurance; her mother, Jaya Chakravarthy, was a housewife and writer. She has two brothers, Kannan and Jagannath, and is the youngest between the two. Her childhood was spent in New Delhi, and later she had her formal education at the Madras Educational Society School, Madras (present-day Chennai).

The book chronicles Malini's acting career, from debuting in the Tamil-language film Idhu Sathiyam (This is a Promise, 1963) and in Bollywood with the commercially unsuccessful romance Sapno Ka Saudagar (The Merchant of Dreams, 1968) to her stardom in the 1970s and 1980s. Apart from that, she is also a Bharatanatyam dancer and has performed it in several stage performances. In 1980, she married the actor Dharmendra and had two daughters: Esha (later becomes an actress) and Ahaana. Her directorial debut, Dil Aashna Hai (The Heart Knows the Truth), starring Shah Rukh Khan and Divya Bharti, was released in 1992. Malini also works as a Bharatiya Janata Party politician, serving for the Rajya Sabha and, subsequently, the Lok Sabha, and as a magazine editor. The book ends with an afterword by the filmmaker Ramesh Sippy and her filmography.

== Background and writing ==
In 2005, the then-Stardust editor Ram Kamal Mukherjee published Hema Malini: Diva Unveiled, which would become the only coffee table book on an Indian actress. It also marked the first biography of the actress Hema Malini; the book did not succeed commercially due to its high price, and critics panned its grammatical mistakes. It ended up as a collector's item but Mukherjee said the book gave him recognition as an author and helped him "find a new lease in Bollywood".^{:9} Another biography was published three years later by Bhawana Somaaya, titled Hema Malini: The Authorized Biography, which got more critical praise. Asked why he wrote a second book on Malini, Mukherjee stated many things happened since the last time he wrote Diva Unveiled and he always wanted "a complete biography that would feature all facets" of her.

While Diva Unveiled was unauthorised, Hema Malini: Beyond the Dream Girl was not. Mukherjee found Malini to be rarely discussing her personal life; he said that, when interviewing her for the book, he got much information on her that had never been published before. Though initially reluctant of the project since there had been two published books about her, Malini was eventually persuaded that Beyond the Dream Girl would cover all her life's aspects and "have a contemporary approach". He also interacted with her colleagues, film directors and producers, friends, and family members (including her daughters Esha and Ahaana).^{:9–12} Writing started in 2015. According to Mukherjee, the research took several years, with one full year of research, another year of writing, and over a year in post-writing work.

"My detractors might probably feel that I can't think 'beyond' Hema Malini. But the fact remains that I wanted my work to reach out to a large readership. I wanted to tell a complete story. I wanted a good publisher to stand by me. This year Hema ... completed 50 years in Bollywood, and she is still so active. If you see the cover of the book you will know what I mean. Give me any other name, other than Hema who can look like this at 69!"

— Mukherjee on Beyond the Dream Girl

== Release and reception ==
Beyond the Dream Girl was edited by Nooshin Mowla. It was released by HarperCollins on Amazon Kindle on 10 October 2017, while its paperback version was released on 1 May 2018. The audiobook edition, narrated by Sumit Kaul, was released on 1 January 2021. It received positive reviews from literary critics, who praised Mukherjee's writing. Joginder Tuteja of Bollywood Hungama gave the book three stars and, comparing it with Somaaya's The Authorized Biography, wrote: "Unlike the last biography which was really text heavy and ended up turning you off as a reader, this biography is a lot more engaging ... the book is fair to the subject in question and it all boils down to what all and how much does she wishes to reveal about her personal life." The Free Press Journal praised Mukherjee's effort in researching for the book.

Writing for The Asian Age, Bhaichand Patel likened the book with a "public relations job" and added "Mukherjee takes everything she tells him as gospel truth". Ektaa Malik from The Indian Express wrote, "If you thought [the book], perhaps, answer all your questions about the various controversies [of] the actor over decades, you will be sorely disappointed. It’s not a no-holds-barred book. It’s at best a well-written Wikipedia entry." Business Line's Sandhya Rao described it as a "surprisingly insightful portrait" of Malini. In Dawn, Oimar Alavi complimented Mukherjee's simpleness and objectiveness, but continued that his "constant inputs seem irrelevant. He fails to include many of [her] films from the 1980s, yet writes 'How I Feel About Hema' as if anyone interested in her career cares."

Reviewing it for the Malayalam-language newspaper Mathrubhumi, Deepa Anthony took note of Mukherjee's neutrality throughout the book, especially that in the chapters of her highly publicised marriage to Dharmendra. Arpita Das of Film Companion included it in her listing of "Top 7 Books on Cinema in 2018", writing, "There is a fearlessness that comes through in these pages ... Just a sense of a rock-solid personality who likes to meet her gaze every morning in the mirror and not feel uncomfortable doing so." For the book, Mukherjee won best-author trophies at the Rajasthan International Film Festival and the Society Achievers' Awards.

== Publication history ==
Region	Release date	Format	Publisher	Ref.
India	10 October 2017	Amazon Kindle	HarperCollins	
India	1 May 2018	Paperback	HarperCollins	
India	1 January 2021	Audiobook	HarperCollins	

== Sources ==
- Alavi, Oimar (11 February 2018). "Non-fiction: Girl of Bollywood's dreams". Dawn. Archived from the original on 11 February 2018.
- Anthony, Deepa (13 December 2017). "സ്വപ്നനായികയ്ക്കുമപ്പുറം" [Beyond the dream heroine]. Mathrubhumi (in Malayalam). Archived from the original on 13 December 2017.
- Bamzai, Kaveree (2 April 2007). "Dance & drama". India Today. Archived from the original on 22 June 2021.
- Chatterji, Shoma (16 December 2017). "A different take on Hema Malini: Ram Kamal Mukherjee goes 'Beyond The Dream Girl'". The Citizen. Archived from the original on 16 December 2017.
- Das, Aprita (19 December 2018). "Top 7 books on cinema in 2018". Film Companion. Archived from the original on 6 August 2020.
- "Exclusive interview with Ram Kamal Mukherjee". Asian World. 24 July 2018. Archived from the original on 28 October 2021.
- "Hema Malini: Beyond the dream girl by Ram Kamal Mukherjee – Review". The Free Press Journal. 3 December 2017. Archived from the original on 2 May 2021.
- Indo-Asian News Service (14 October 2017). "Beyond the Dreamgirl: Narendra Modi pens foreword for Hema Malini's biography". Hindustan Times. Archived from the original on 2 May 2021.
- Malik, Ektaa (18 November 2017). "ShelfLife: Star struck". The Indian Express. Archived from the original on 18 November 2017.
- Mukherjee, Ram Kamal (10 October 2017). Hema Malini. HarperCollins. ASIN B075RVK9QP.
- Mukherjee, Ram Kamal (1 May 2018). Hema Malini. HarperCollins. ISBN 978-93-52773-22-0.
- Mukherjee, Ram Kamal (1 January 2021). Hema Malini. HarperCollins. ASIN B08R6J93PK.
- Patel, Bhaichand (26 November 2017). "Idolising hagiography that fails to take off". The Asian Age. Archived from the original on 24 November 2020.
- "Ram Kamal awarded at RIFF". Box Office India. 31 January 2018. Archived from the original on 17 September 2021.
- "Ram Kamal Mukherjee bags Society Achievers Best Author Award for his book". Deccan Chronicle. 19 January 2018. Archived from the original on 20 January 2018.
- Rao, Sandhya (9 March 2018). "Book review: Dream Girl dreams". Business Line. Archived from the original on 6 December 2020.
- Tankha, Madhur (10 March 2005). "'Dream girl' unveiled". The Hindu. Archived from the original on 7 October 2021.
- Tuteja, Joginder (7 November 2017). "Book review: Hema Malini – Beyond the Dream Girl". Bollywood Hungama. Archived from the original on 9 November 2017.
