= List of awards and nominations received by Hema Malini =

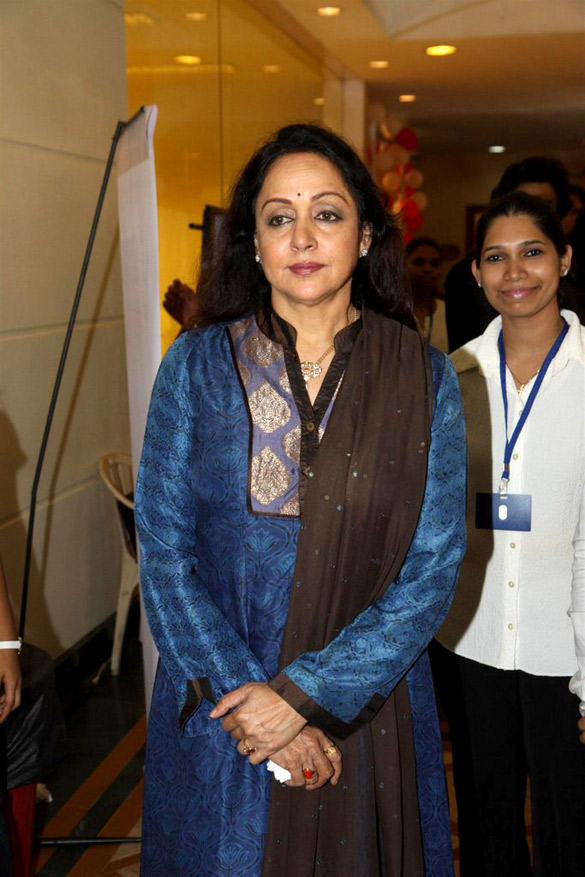
Hema Malini at an event

Hema Malini is an Indian actress who primarily works in Bollywood films. Apart from being an actress, she has also worked as a director, producer, dancer-choreographer, and politician. Malini made her acting debut as a lead actress through the 1968 Hindi film Sapno Ka Saudagar, and went on to appear in numerous films throughout the 1970s and 80s. Her performances in both commercial and arthouse productions won a lot of accolades. During her career, Malini has been nominated 11 times for the Filmfare Award for Best Actress, of which she won once in 1972 for her role as twin-sisters in Seeta Aur Geeta; the first time she was nominated for the award. She received two nominations in a single year on two occasions – Amir Garib, Prem Nagar (both in 1974) and Sanyasi, Mehbooba (both in 1975). Malini was initially promoted as "Dream Girl" of Bollywood, and went on to star in a film of the same name in 1977. After her marriage with co-star Dharmendra, she continued to act in various films which included a few art films. Malini's portrayal as an attitudinal wife in Rihaee won her a Filmfare Best Actress nomination for the tenth time. In 2000, she was presented with the Filmfare Lifetime Achievement Award for her contribution to films. In the same year, she was honoured with the Padma Shri, India's fourth-highest civilian honour. The Sir Padampat Singhania University conferred an Honorary Doctorate upon Malini in recognition of her contribution to Indian cinema in 2012. After a brief hiatus, Malini made a comeback with Baghban in 2003. She played an elderly woman and was paired opposite Amitabh Bachchan, earning a Best Actress Award nomination from Filmfare for the eleventh time. She received lot of praise and nominations for her work in the film such as the Most Sensational Actress at the Bollywood Movie Awards and the Star Screen Award Jodi No. 1.

== Civilian award ==
Year	Award	Honouring body	Outcome	Ref.
2000	Padma Shri	Government of India	Won	

== Honorary Doctorate ==
Year	Nominated artist	Honouring body	Outcome	Ref.
2012	Honorary Doctorate - Doctor of Philosophy	Sir Padampat Singhania University	Conferred	
2014	Doctor of letter - Honoris Causa	Shri Jagdishprasad Jhabarmal Tibrewala University (JJT), Jhunjhunu, Rajasthan	Conferred	

== Filmfare Awards ==
Year	Film	Category	Outcome	Ref.
1973	Seeta Aur Geeta	Best Actress	Won	
1974	Amir Garib	Best Actress	Nominated	
1974	Prem Nagar	Best Actress	Nominated	
1975	Khushboo	Best Actress	Nominated	
1975	Sanyasi	Best Actress	Nominated	
1976	Mehbooba	Best Actress	Nominated	
1977	Kinara	Best Actress	Nominated	
1979	Meera	Best Actress	Nominated	
1981	Naseeb	Best Actress	Nominated	
1990	Rihaee	Best Actress	Nominated	
1999	—	Lifetime Achievement	Won	
2003	Baghban	Best Actress	Nominated	

== Bollywood Movie Awards ==
Year	Film	Category	Outcome	Ref.
2003	—	Lifetime Achievement	Won	
2004	Baghban	Most Sensational Actress	Won	

== Screen Awards ==
Year	Film	Category	Outcome	Notes
2003	Baghban	Star Screen Award Jodi No. 1	Won	Shared with Amitabh Bachchan

== Zee Cine Awards ==
Year	Film	Category	Outcome	Ref.
2003	—	Lifetime Achievement	Won	

== Other awards and honours ==
- 1998 – Guest of Honour Award at the 18th Ujala Cinema Express Awards
- 2004 – Sports World's "Jodi of the Year" along with Amitabh Bachchan for Baghban
- 2004 – Icon of the Year
- 2004 – "Living Legend Award" by the Federation of Indian Chamber of Commerce and Industry (FICCI) in recognition of her contribution to the Indian entertainment industry
- 2005 – Ranked as one of the "Most popular Actress in India" by the Hansa Research's new syndicated study, Celebrity Track.
- 2006 – "SaMaPa Vitasta Award 2006" in Delhi by SAMAPA – "Sopori Academy of Music And Performing Arts" for her contribution and service to Dance.
- 2007 – Rashtrabhushan Award From FIE Foundation Ichalkaranji
- 2007 – The 2007 Bangkok International Film Festival screened several films starring Hema Malini in a special tribute programme
- 2008 – Honoured for her contribution to classical dance
- 2009 – Lifetime Achievement Award at the 7th Pune International Film Festival (PIFF)
- 2010 – Rajinikanth Legend award
- 2010 – Rajiv Gandhi Award
- 2011 – PETA'S Person of the Year
- 2011 – ANR National Award
- 2011 – Aadhi Aabadi Women Achievers award for her contribution to Indian cinema
- 2012 – International Personality of the Year award at the 12th Asian Achievers Awards
- 2012 – Postal stamp issued by the Government of Norway at the 10th Annual Bollywood Festival
- 2012 – Bharat Muni Samman for outstanding contribution to the field of art and culture
- 2018 – Lux Golden Rose Iconic Beauty Over the Decades Award at the 2018 Lux Golden Rose Awards
- 2021 – Honoured with Indian Film Personality of the Year Award at 52nd International Film Festival of India.
