= Hema Malini =

Indian actress and politician (born 1948)

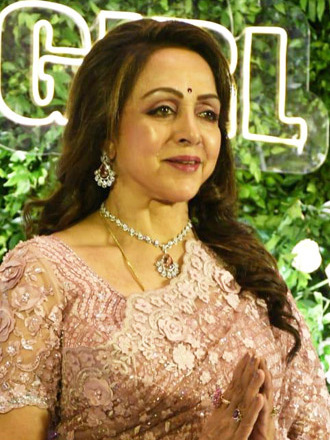
- Malini at her 75th birthday celebration in 2023
- Born: 16 October 1948 (age 78); Ammankudi, Madras Province, Dominion of India
- Other name: Dream Girl
- Occupations: Actress; producer; director; politician
- Years active: 1963–present
- Works: Filmography
- Spouse: Dharmendra (m. 1980; died 2025)
- Children: 2, including Esha Deol
- Family: Deol family
- Awards: See list
- Honours: Padma Shri (2000)

Member of Parliament, Lok Sabha
- Incumbent
- Assumed office 16 May 2014
- Preceded by: Jayant Chaudhary
- Constituency: Mathura, Uttar Pradesh
- Party: Bharatiya Janata Party (2003–present)

Member of Parliament, Rajya Sabha
- In office 4 March 2010 – 2 April 2012
- Preceded by: M. Rajasekara Murthy
- Succeeded by: Basavaraja Patil Sedam
- Constituency: Karnataka
- In office 16 November 2003 – 15 November 2009
- Nominated by: A.P.J. Abdul Kalam
- Preceded by: Shabana Azmi
- Succeeded by: Javed Akhtar
- Constituency: Nominated (Arts)

Hema Malini Dharmendra Deol (born 16 October 1948; Hindi pronunciation: [ɦeːmaː maːlɪn̪iː d̪ʱəɾmeːn̪d̪ɾə d̪eːoːl]) is an Indian actress, director, producer, and politician who is currently serving as a member of the Lok Sabha from the Bharatiya Janata Party (BJP), representing Mathura constituency since 2014. She was a member of the Rajya Sabha from Karnataka from 2011 to 2012, subsequent to her nomination to that chamber from 2003 to 2009 as a member of the BJP. Primarily known for her work in Hindi films, she has starred in both comic and dramatic roles, and is one of the most popular and successful leading actresses of mainstream Hindi cinema.

Malini made her acting debut in 1963 with the Tamil film Idhu Sathiyam. Malini first acted in a lead role in Sapno Ka Saudagar (1968), and went on to feature in numerous Hindi films, frequently opposite Dharmendra, whom she married in 1980. Malini was initially promoted as the "Dream Girl", and in 1977 starred in a film of the same name. She won the Filmfare Award for Best Actress for her dual role in the comedy Seeta Aur Geeta (1972), and was nominated ten more times leading up to Baghban (2003). In 2000, Malini won the Filmfare Lifetime Achievement Award and in 2019 a Filmfare Special Award for 50 Years of Outstanding Contribution to Cinema.

Malini was honoured with the Padma Shri in 2000, the fourth-highest civilian honour awarded by the Government of India. In 2012, the Sir Padampat Singhania University conferred an honorary doctorate on Malini in recognition of her contribution to Indian cinema. Malini served as chairperson of the National Film Development Corporation. In 2006, Malini received the Sopori Academy of Music And Performing Arts (SaMaPa) Vitasta award from Bhajan Sopori in Delhi for her contribution and service to Indian culture and dance. In 2013, she received the NTR National Award from the Government of Andhra Pradesh for her contribution to Indian cinema. Malini has been involved with charitable and social ventures. Currently, Malini is also a life member of the International Society for Krishna Consciousness (ISKCON).

== Early life and family ==
Malini was born in a Tamil Iyengar Brahmin family to Jaya Lakshmi and VSR Chakravarti Iyengar in Ammankudi, Madras Province (now Tamil Nadu). She has two elder brothers. She attended the Andhra Mahila Sabha in Chennai. She studied at DTEA Mandir Marg until 11th standard, after which she pursued her acting career. She follows Hinduism.

Mailni first met Dharmendra at a film premiere in 1968, their first film together was Tum Haseen Main Jawaan (1970) which marked their love story. They later married on 2 May 1980 having known each other for more than ten years and being in relationship for about six years. Dharmendra already had two sons and two daughters with his first wife Prakash Kaur, two of whom later became Hindi cinema actors – Sunny Deol and Bobby Deol. Malini and Dharmendra had two daughters, Esha Deol (born 1981) and Ahana Deol Vohra (born 1985).

Madhoo, who played the female lead in Phool Aur Kaante, Roja and Annayya, is Malini's cousin. Malini's father died in 1978 when she was 30 whereas her mother passed away in 2004 when she was 56.

On 11 June 2015, Malini became a grandmother when her younger daughter, Ahana Deol Vohra, gave birth to her first child, a son, Darien Vohra and twin girls Astraia and Adea Vohra were born on 26 November 2020. On 20 October 2017, her elder daughter, Esha Deol, gave birth to a girl, Radhya Takhtani and another baby girl Miraya Takhtani on 10 June 2019. Businessman Vaibhav Vohra is her son-in-law and Bharat Takhtani is her ex-son-in-law.

Malini's husband Dharmendra died on 24 November 2025 at the age of 89 following a period of brief illness. Their association lasted 57 years, including 45 years together in marriage until his death.

== Film career ==
=== 1960–1970: Early work ===
Malini played small roles in Pandava Vanavasam (1965) and Idhu Sathiyam (1962). In 1968, she was chosen to play the female lead opposite Raj Kapoor in Sapno Ka Saudagar and was promoted as the Dream Girl.

=== 1970–1980: Established actress and stardom ===
Malini played the lead in Johny Mera Naam (1970). Roles in subsequent films such as Andaz (1971) and Lal Patthar (1971) established her as a leading actress. In 1972, she played a double role opposite Dharmendra and Sanjeev Kumar in Seeta Aur Geeta, which earned her a Filmfare Best Actress Award for the film. Seeta Aur Geeta subverted the formula of Ram Aur Shyam, by the heroine Malini eventually becoming the "hero" while male lead Sanjeev Kumar and Dharmendra is in a mostly supporting role.

Malini further established herself with successful films including Sanyasi, Dharmatma, Pratigya, Sholay and Trishul to name a few. Sholay received negative critical reviews and a tepid commercial response during its initial release. However, favourable word-of-mouth publicity helped it to become a box office success. It is often regarded as one of the greatest and most influential Indian films of all time.

Malini and Dharmendra have acted together in 28 films including Sharafat, Tum Haseen Main Jawan, Naya Zamana, Raja Jani, Seeta Aur Geeta, Patthar Aur Payal, Dost (1974), Sholay (1975), Charas, Jugnu, Apna Khoon, Azaad (1978) and Dillagi (1978).

Malini's pairing with Rajesh Khanna was appreciated in Andaz and Prem Nagar. Andaz was a big hit and an important milestone in the career of Hema Malini as an actress. It features Zindagi Ek Safar Hai Suhana, one of the best-known Bollywood yodels. Their subsequent films such as Mehbooba and Janta Hawaldar however, did not do well at the box office. Over the years, Janta Hawaldar has gained a cult following.

=== 1980–1997: Continued success and reduction in workload ===
In the 1980s, Malini continued to star in big budget films such as Kranti, Naseeb, Satte Pe Satta and Rajput, most of whom proved to be successful at the box office. She continued to work in heroine-centric roles even after becoming a mother in films such as Aandhi Toofan, Durgaa, Ramkali, Sitapur Ki Geeta, Ek Chadar Maili Si, Rihaee and Jamai Raja.

During this period, her films with Dharmendra included Alibaba Aur 40 Chor, Samraat, Razia Sultan, Baghavat, and Raaj Tilak. She continued to be paired with Rajesh Khanna in movies such as Dard, Bandish, Kudrat, Hum Dono, Rajput, Babu, Durgaa, Sitapur Ki Geeta and Paap Ka Ant, some of whom were major successes in her career.

In 1992, she directed and produced the film Dil Aashna Hai, starring Divya Bharti and Shah Rukh Khan in the leading roles. She also directed and produced her second film Mohini in 1995, which starred her niece Madhoo and Sudesh Berry in the lead roles. She then focused on dancing and television work, only occasionally appearing in films. In 1997, she appeared in Vinod Khanna's production Himalay Putra.

=== 2003–2020: Intermittent work ===
After taking a break from films for a number of years, Malini made a comeback with Baghban (2003), for which she earned a Filmfare Best Actress Award nomination. It has gained cult status and emerged as the fifth-highest-grossing Indian film Reviewing the film Taran Adarsh stated, "Malini was elegant and conveys the pathos convincingly."

Malini also made guest appearances in the 2004 film Veer-Zaara and the 2007 film Laaga Chunari Mein Daag, in addition to a supporting role in the 2006 film Baabul. In 2010, she acted in Sadiyaan alongside fellow veteran actress Rekha. In 2011, she directed and produced her third film Tell Me O Kkhuda which featured both her husband Dharmendra and her oldest daughter Esha Deol, which was a box office failure. In 2017, she appeared in the film Ek Thi Rani Aisi Bhi in the role of Vijaya Raje Scindia of Gwalior, with Vinod Khanna playing her husband; however, it was Khanna's last film before his death. The film was directed by Gul Bahar Singh. The film was released on 21 April 2017. Her most recent film is Shimla Mirchi, starring Rajkummar Rao and Rakul Preet Singh. The movie was theatrically released in India on 3 January 2020 and made available on Netflix on 27 January 2020.

Malini made her directorial debut in 1992 with Dil Aashna Hai starring Shah Rukh Khan and Divya Bharti. Her second directorial came in 2011 with Tell Me O Kkhuda. It starred Dharmendra, Vinod Khanna, Rishi Kapoor, Esha Deol, and Arjan Bajwa.

== Political career ==
In 1999, Malini campaigned for the Bharatiya Janata Party (BJP) candidate, Vinod Khanna, a former Bollywood actor, in the Lok Sabha Elections in Gurdaspur, Punjab. In February 2004, Malini officially joined the BJP. From 2003 to 2009, she served as an MP to the upper house – the Rajya Sabha, having been nominated by the then President of India, Dr. A.P.J. Abdul Kalam. In March 2010, Malini was made general secretary of the BJP, and in February 2011, she was recommended by Ananth Kumar, the party general secretary. In the 2014 general elections for the Lok Sabha, Malini defeated the Mathura incumbent, Jayant Chaudhary (RLD) by 3,30,743 votes.

In 2019 Lok Sabha elections, Hema Malini retained her Mathura Lok Sabha seat with comfortable margin. While Hema Malini won 6,71,293 votes, her nearest rival Kunwar Narendra Singh received 3,77,822 votes, so that she won the Mathura seat by around 3 lakh votes. In the 2024 Lok Sabha elections, Malini won Mathura Lok Sabha constituency by a huge margin against Congress candidate Mukesh Dhanger, making it a hat-trick from Mathura.

== Philanthropy ==
Malini is a supporter of the animal rights organisation, PETA India. In 2009, she wrote a letter to the Mumbai Municipal Commissioner urging him to ban horse carriages from Mumbai's busy streets. In 2011, she wrote to the Union Minister for Environment and Forests, Jairam Ramesh, urging him to ban bullfighting (jallikattu). She said, "My friends at PETA have organised investigations at Jallikattu events and documented that bulls are pulled roughly by their nose rings, punched, pummelled, hit with sharp sticks and crammed into trucks so tightly that they can barely move". PETA named Malini their "PETA Person of the Year" for 2011. As a vegetarian, she said, "Knowing that my food choices are helping the planet and animals too, makes me happy".

== Other works ==
=== Dance ===
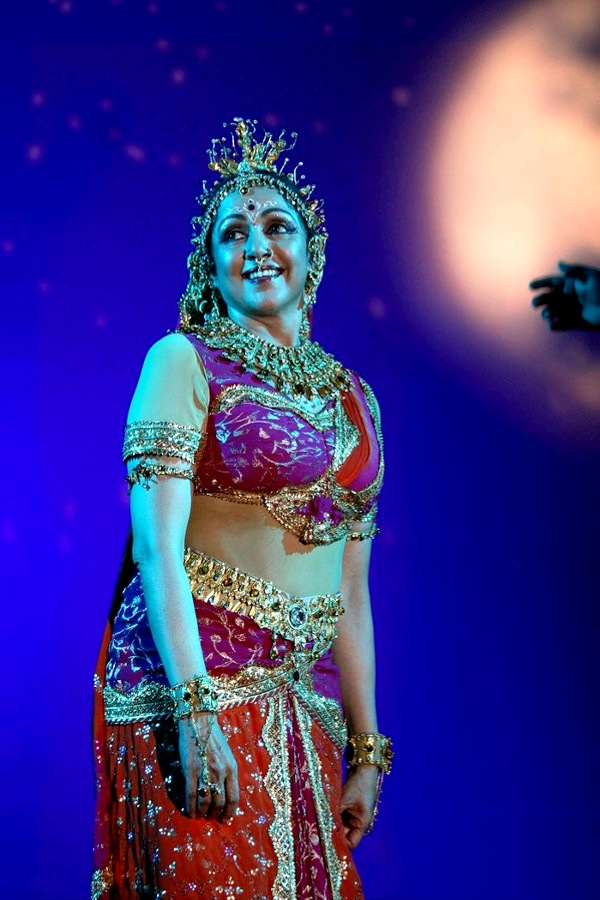
Malini performing at a concert in 2011

Malini is a trained Bharatanatyam dancer. Her daughters Esha Deol and Ahana Deol are trained Odissi dancers. They performed with Malini in a production called Parampara for charitable events. She also performed with her daughters at the Khajuraho Dance Festival.

Malini studied Kuchipudi with Vempati Chinna Satyam and Mohiniattam with Kalamandalam Guru Gopalakrishnan. She has played a number of dance roles including Narasimha and Rama in Tulasidas's Ramcharitmanas. In 2007, she performed in Mysuru on the eve of Dussehra, where she played the roles of Sati, Parvati and Durga. In 2024, for the inauguration of the Ram Mandir in Ayodhya, she played as Sita in a theatre drama retelling of the Ramayana.

Malini owns the Natya Vihar Kalakendra dance school. In 2016 the Bombay High Court entertained a Public Interest Litigation challenging allotment of a plot of land in Mumbai to Malini's dance academy. The petitioner Ketan Tirodkar sought to file a cheating case against the actress for defrauding the government to allot a piece of land which was reserved for gardens. The State Government of Maharashtra informed the Bombay High Court that Malini had not yet accepted the land allotted to her.

=== Television ===
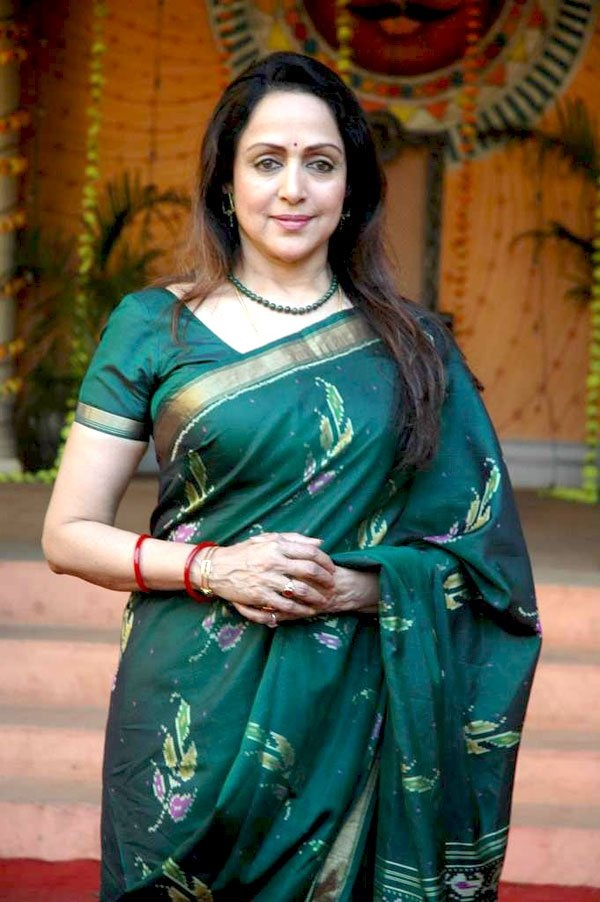
Malini in 2011

Malini directed and produced serials for Doordarshan like Terah Panneh, Rani Laxmibai, Bharti, and Noopur. She also appeared as anchor for weekly Rangoli on Doordarshan.

Malini has appeared in television serials such as Jai Mata Ki (1999), on Doordarshan, directed by Puneet Issar. She played the role of goddess Durga.

Other television series appearances include Kamini Damini on Sahara One where she played twin sisters and Noopur which Malini directed and in which she played a Bharatanatyam dancer. Malini also starred in Yug, a fictional series depicting the story of Indian freedom fighters and their struggle to win freedom for India.

=== Production and promotional work ===
Malini was the editor of New Woman and Meri Saheli, Hindi women's magazine. In 2000, Malini was appointed as the first female chairperson of the National Film Development Corporation for a term of three years. Malini has also served as a jury member at several national and international film festivals and literary events.

In 2007, Malini entered a promotional contract with Kent RO Systems, makers of a mineral water purifier system. Malini also became a brand ambassador for Pothys, a textile showroom in Chennai.

== Artistry and legacy ==
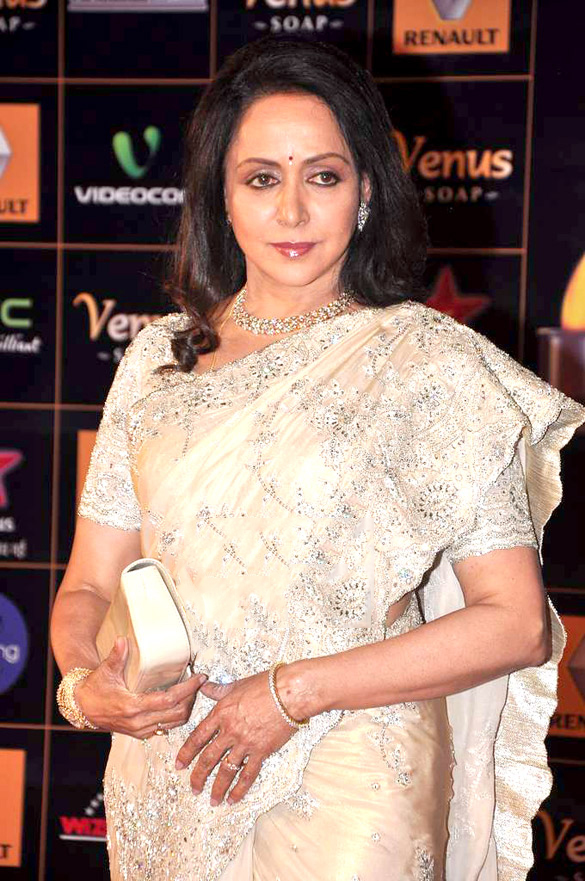
Malini in 2013

Malini is considered among the finest actresses of Hindi cinema and is regarded for her range of roles, her dance, beauty and her styling. During the 1970s and early 1980s, she was among the highest paid actress. She was placed 1st in its "All TimeTop Actresses" list and she topped its top actresses list from 1968 to 1990.She appeared in Box Office India's "Top Actress" list 16 times, from 1970 to 1985 and topped the list 11 times (1972-1979, 1981-1983). Rediff.com placed Malini in their "Bollywood's Best Actresses of all time" list. In 2022, Malini was also placed in Outlook India's "75 Best Bollywood Actresses" list. Filmfare included Malini's performances in Seeta Aur Geeta and Sholay at 46th and 41st place respectively, in its list of Bollywood's "80 Iconic Performances".

Malini was known as among the style icons of the 70s, with funky polka dot blouses as her style statement. She was placed in Times of India's "50 Beautiful Faces" list. Malini has been cited in the media as the "Dream Girl" of Bollywood. Bindu Batra of India Today noted, "Her rise was ascribed partly to her youth and largely to her cultivated resemblance to Vyjayanthimala." Rachit Gupta of Filmfare feels her "dominance was unprecedented" and said, "Malini defined everything that the Dream Girl tag stood for. She could dance, act, emote with equal ease." Rajeev Masand termed her the "radiant superstar". Dinesh Raheja of Rediff.com praised her "takes-your-eyes-prisoner beauty" and "tinkling laugh" and noted, "Hema was never in danger of being mistaken for a thespian. But for sheer screen presence, she was hard to beat."

Malini was placed 18th among the "Greatest Bollywood Stars", in a UK poll celebrating 100 years of Indian cinema in 2013. Malini received the "Living Legend Award" by FICCI in recognition of her contribution to the Indian entertainment industry. The 2007 Bangkok International Film Festival screened several films starring Hema Malini in a special tribute programme She has been the recipient of Rajinikanth Legend award (2010), Rajiv Gandhi Award (2010), and ANR National Award (2011). For her presence around the world, she received the International Personality of the Year award at the 12th Asian Achievers Awards In 2021, she was honoured with the Indian Film Personality of the Year Award at the 52nd International Film Festival of India. Three biographies of Malini have been published, As of June 2021, namely - Hema Malini: Diva Unveiled, that released in 2005 Hema Malini: The Authorized Biography by Bhawana Somaaya in 2007, and Hema Malini: Beyond the Dream Girl by Ram Kamal Mukherjee in 2017,

== Accolades ==
Malini received eleven Filmfare Award for Best Actress nominations, but won only one among them, for Seeta Aur Geeta (1972). In 1999, she received the Filmfare Lifetime Achievement Award.

== Bibliography ==
- Mukherjee, Ram Kamal (2005). Hema Malini: Diva Unveiled. Magna Publishing Co. Ltd. ISBN 978-81-7809-286-7.
- Somaaya, Bhawana (2007). Hema Malini: The Authorized Biography. The Lotus Collection. ISBN 978-81-74366-50-4.
- Mukherjee, Ram Kamal (2017). Hema Malini: Beyond the Dream Girl. HarperCollins India. ISBN 978-93-5277-323-7.

== See also ==
- List of awards and nominations received by Hema Malini
- List of Indian film actresses
