= Assorted Motion Pictures =

Indian entertainment company

- Industry: Entertainment
- Founded: 2015
- Founders: Aritra Das
- Headquarters: Mumbai, India
- Key people: Aritra Das; Sarbani Mukherjee; Ram Kamal Mukherjee
- Website: Official Website

Assorted Motion Pictures is a production house based in Mumbai, India. The house was founded by Aritra Das, Sarbani Mukherjee and Ram Kamal Mukherjee in 2015.

== Operations ==
The production house is based in Mumbai and has produced a range of short films. It has produced successful films like Rickshawala, Cakewalk, Broken Frame, Seasons Greeting, Shubho Bijoya and upcoming film is The Inside Job.

== Filmography ==
Year	Film	Cast	Director	Notes	Ref.
2019	Cakewalk	Esha Deol, Anindita Bose, Tarun Malhotra	Ram Kamal Mukherjee	Short Film	
2019	Seasons Greeting	Lillete Dubey, Shree Ghatak, Celina Jaitly	Ram Kamal Mukherjee	Feature Film	
2021	Rickshawala	Kasturi Chakraborty, Avinash Dwivedi, Sangita Sinha	Ram Kamal Mukherjee	Feature Film	
2019	Broken Frame	Ritabhari Chakraborty, Rohit Roy, Ananya Sengupta	Ram Kamal Mukherjee	Short Film	
2020	Subho Bijoya	Debina Bonnerjee, Gurmeet Choudhary, Khushboo Karva	Ram Kamal Mukherjee	Short Film	
2021	The Inside Job †	Sreelekha Mitra, Saheb Chatterjee, Priyanka Bhattacharjee	Shieladitya Moulik		
Upcoming	Kalabai †	Sharib Hasmi, Shruti Bapna	Saumitra Singh		
2021	Ek Duaa	Esha Deol	Ram Kamal Mukherjee		
2021	The Wallet	Naseeruddin Shah	Saumitra Singh		
2025	Binodiini: Ekti Natir Upakhyan	Rukmini Maitra, Kaushik Ganguly, Rahul Bose, Om Sahani	Ram Kamal Mukherjee		
