= SPSU =

SPSU may refer to:

- Southern Polytechnic State University
- Sir Padampat Singhania University
