= The Story So Far (book) =

- Author: Bhawana Somaaya
- Language: English
- Subject: Hindi cinema
- Genre: Non-fiction
- Published: 12 February 2003
- Publisher: Indian Express Limited
- Publication place: India
- Media type: Print
- Pages: 324
- ISBN: 978-81-223-1016-0

The Story So Far (also known as The Story So Far: On-Screen, Off-Screen) is a 2003 Indian non-fictional book by the author and journalist Bhawana Somaaya about Hindi cinema, including its evolution and its actors' on-screen and off-screen life. Published by the Indian Express Limited, the book was released on 12 February 2003 and critics gave mixed reviews.

== Summary ==
The Story So Far chronicles the evolution of Hindi cinema from the release of Ardeshir Irani's Alam Ara, India's first sound film, in 1931 to 2002, and details milestones created by the industry before the independence of India. It examines the industry's actors' life, both on-screen (including their debuts, commercial successes and film launches) and off-screen (including their personal life).

== Background and release ==
Bhawana Somaaya had worked as an editor for Screen magazine of the Indian Express Limited for three years. The Story So Far was edited by Somaaya and marked her fourth book after Amitabh Bachchan: The Legend (1999), Salaam Bollywood: The Pain and the Passion (2000), and Take 25: Star Insights & Attitudes (2002). It was published by the Indian Express Limited at a private event, attended by Juhi Chawla and Tusshar Kapoor, in Mumbai's Oxford Bookstore on 12 February 2003. Jeanne E. Fredriksen from India Currents was ambivalent of the book, saying, "Sadly—but understandably—it is weighed down by ads."
