= Baghban (2003 film) =

2003 Indian film by Ravi Chopra

- Theatrical release poster
- Directed by: Ravi Chopra
- Written by: B. R. Chopra; Achala Nagar; Satish Bhatnagar; Ram Govind; Shafiq Ansari; Salim-Javed
- Story by: B. R. Chopra
- Produced by: B. R. Chopra
- Starring: Amitabh Bachchan; Hema Malini; Salman Khan; Mahima Chaudhry
- Cinematography: Barun Mukherjee
- Edited by: Shailendra Doke; Godfrey Gonsalves; Shashi Mane
- Music by: Aadesh Shrivastava
- Production company: B. R. Films
- Release dates: 2 October 2003 (Leeds International Film Festival); 3 October 2003 (India)
- Running time: 181 minutes
- Country: India
- Language: Hindi
- Budget: ₹100 million
- Box office: ₹431.1 million

Baghban (transl. Gardener) is a 2003 Indian Hindi-language family drama film directed by Ravi Chopra and co-written and produced by B. R. Chopra. It tells the story of an elderly couple, Raj (Amitabh Bachchan) and Pooja (Hema Malini), who have been married for 40 years. After Raj retires, they reunite with their four sons (Aman Verma, Samir Soni, Saahil Chadha, Nasir Khan) to discuss who will support them. However, none of the sons want to take care of both parents, causing Raj and Pooja to live separately.

Baghban was conceived by producer and co-writer B. R. Chopra during his 1960s trip across Europe, when he visited a retirement home and was inspired by the householders' story. Although the screenplay was finished in 1973, Chopra did not begin production for decades because he was busy with other projects. After he revived it, principal photography began in July 2002 in Film City. Baghban's soundtrack was composed by Aadesh Shrivastava, with lyrics written by Sameer.

The film premiered at the Leeds International Film Festival on 2 October 2003, and was released worldwide the following day. With a production cost of ₹100 million (US$1.1 million), the film was a commercial success; earning ₹431.1 million (US$4.6 million) at the box office, Baghban was the year's fifth-highest-grossing Indian film. It received mixed reviews from critics, Bachchan and Malini's performances were praised. They received the Screen Award for Jodi No. 1. Bachchan and Malini were nominated for Best Actor and Best Actress at the 49th Filmfare Awards. It has gained cult status.

== Plot ==
Raj and his wife, Pooja, have been married for 40 years and have four sons: Ajay, Sanjay, Rohit, and Karan. They also have an adopted son, Alok, who falls in love with Arpita. Raj provides the orphaned Alok with money and education, raising him as his own son. Now successful, Alok venerates Raj because of his help. Raj retires and cannot support himself; he and Pooja decide to leave their home. They want to live with their children, who are unwilling to take care of them. The children decide to split their parents up; each lives with one of the sons for the next six months. They think that their parents will refuse the offer and remain in their home. However, Raj and Pooja reluctantly accept the offer.

They endure separation and poor treatment by their children. Raj stays first with Sanjay, and then with Rohit; Pooja stays first with Ajay, and then with Karan. While living with Sanjay, the only affection Raj receives is from his grandson Rahul. Saddened by the way he has been treated by his children, Raj writes about how he fulfilled his children's dreams and his treatment in return; he also writes about his love for his wife, and the pain their separation has caused. Pooja is abused by Ajay, her daughter-in-law Kiran, and her granddaughter Payal. Payal, however, repents when Pooja saves her from a rape attempt by her boyfriend and showers Pooja with love.

Changing trains after six months, Pooja and Raj spend time together in Vijaynagar. They encounter Alok, who brings them to his home and cares for them far better than how their sons had treated them in their homes. Raj learns that his writings have been published as Baghban, by Hemant, a café owner whom he befriended, along with two teenagers Kapil and Nilli, during his stay with Sanjay. The novel becomes a success, giving Raj the money he needs to support himself and Pooja. Knowing that their parents are earning more than them due to the launch success of the novel, the four sons and their wives plan to go to their book ceremony event for forgiveness. Everyone goes except Rahul and Payal because of the pain their grandparents went through and that the four sons are only going there just for their money not forgiveness. The sons ask for forgiveness, but Raj and Pooja refuse and disown them for the pain they have caused. Raj and Pooja then reunite with Payal and Rahul, and declare Alok and Arpita as their only son and daughter-in-law.

== Cast ==
The cast is listed below:

- Amitabh Bachchan as Raj Malhotra a retired employee of ICICI Bank
- Hema Malini as Pooja Malhotra; Raj's wife
- Salman Khan as Alok Raj Malhotra; Raj and Pooja's adopted son
  - Smith Sen as young Alok
- Mahima Chaudhry as Arpita Malhotra; Alok's wife
- Aman Verma as Ajay Malhotra; Raj and Pooja's eldest son
- Samir Soni as Sanjay Malhotra; Raj and Pooja's second son
- Saahil Chadha as Rohit Malhotra; Raj and Pooja's third son
- Nasir Khan as Karan Malhotra; Raj and Pooja's fourth son
- Suman Ranganathan as Kiran Malhotra; Ajay's wife
- Divya Dutta as Reena Malhotra; Sanjay's wife
- Arzoo Govitrikar as Priya Malhotra; Rohit's wife
- Rimi Sen as Payal Malhotra; Ajay and Kiran's Daughter; Raj and Pooja's granddaughter
- Yash Pathak as Rahul Malhotra; Sanjay and Reena's Son; Raj and Pooja's grandson
- Paresh Rawal as Hemant Patel; Shanti's husband and Raj's friend
- Lillete Dubey as Shanti Patel; Hemant's wife and Raj's friend
- Sharat Saxena as Ram Avtaar; Raj's neighbour
- Nakul Vaid as Kapil Verma; Mr. Verma's son and Nilli's boyfriend
- Sanjeeda Sheikh as Nilli; Kapil's girlfriend
- Asrani as Mr. Bedi; employee of ICICI Bank; Mr. Rawat and Raj's friend
- Avtar Gill as Mr. Rawat; ICICI Bank manager
- Mohan Joshi as Khuber Desai; hotel owner
- Anang Desai as Mr. Verma; Kapil's father and Raj's book publisher
- Gajendra Chauhan as car salesman

== Production ==
=== Development ===
The idea for Baghban came to director and producer B. R. Chopra in Copenhagen during a tour across Europe in the 1960s, when he stayed at a hotel next to a retirement home. In a Screen interview, Chopra said that when he sat on the hotel balcony, he saw elderly people sitting at the bungalows. After several days, he joined a couple there and struck up a conversation about their personal lives. The couple talked about feeling abandoned by their children and grandchildren, inspiring Chopra to make a film. During a 1973 holiday in Lonavala, he began writing the screenplay one afternoon and continued for fourteen hours; he finished it the next morning.

Chopra met his son, Ravi Chopra, back in Mumbai. Ravi was filming the action drama Zameer, a 1975 release starring Amitabh Bachchan and Saira Banu. During the filming, Banu told Ravi that she was tired and wanted to continue filming at Pali Hill. B. R. Chopra told his close friend, Dilip Kumar, that he wanted to make a film with him. Several years later, at a ceremony honouring Chopra's films, he asked Kumar about the project; the actor suggested casting Rakhee Gulzar as his wife, but Chopra did not do so. Banu became ill and went to London with her husband, Kumar. B. R. and Ravi Chopra were busy with Doordarshan's epic series Mahabharat (1988–1990), and Baghban was shelved. According to Ravi Chopra, who initially liked the story and wanted to direct it, he tried several times to revive the production but his other projects "kept coming to the fore".

After years in development hell, the project was revived. Achala Nagar was chosen to help B. R. Chopra write the screenplay, dialogue, and story; Satish Bhatnagar, Ram Govind, and Shafiq Ansari co-wrote them, and Salim Khan and Javed Akhtar polished the dialogue. Baghban was the last unofficial partnership between the legendary Salim–Javed screenwriter duo. Bachchan had requested that Akhtar write his final speech in the film while Salman Khan requested his father Salim Khan to write his speech in the film. Neither Salim Khan nor Javed Akhtar were credited.

=== Casting ===
The role of Raj Malhotra, for which Ravi Chopra had wanted Kumar, was given to Bachchan because the former actor was too old to play a 60-year-old man. Hema Malini was cast as Pooja, who is five years younger than Raj. The Chopras originally wanted a much-younger actress to star with Bachchan, but they changed their minds to avoid difficulty with the make-up a younger actress would require. Although Malini was initially reluctant to play a film role unless she liked it, she did not want to disappoint her fans. When she heard the story, she said she had waited a long time for a film suited for her age. Baghban reunited Bachchan and Malini onscreen after 20 years, having last appeared together in Nastik (1983). Neeta Lulla and B. R. Chopra's daughter-in-law, Renu, were Malini's costume designers.

=== Filming ===
Principal photography began in Film City on 18 July 2002. Ravi Chopra told journalist Roshmila Bhattacharya that he was nervous during that period, and called it "an exam" for him. The film was produced on an estimated budget of ₹70 million (equivalent to ₹280 million or US$3.0 million in 2026); Barun Mukherjee was the cinematographer. Ashok Bhushan and Keshto Mondal designed the sets, and Vaibhavi Merchant choreographed the songs. In January 2003, it was reported that Salman Khan and Mahima Chaudhry would appear in the film. Portions of Baghban were also filmed in London, and it was edited by Shailendra Doke, Godfrey Gonsalves, and Shashi Mane.

The core plot of the film was inspired by the 1937 American film Make Way for Tomorrow, which was later adapted into the Japanese classic Tokyo Story (1953). Avtaar, a 1983 Indian film, starring Rajesh Khanna and Shabana Azmi, has also been noted as an inspiration, though Ravi Chopra denied that Baghban was a remake of it, stating that the plot of that film was about a father seeking revenge on his children while this film, in contrast, focused on the bond between an old couple.

== Soundtrack ==
Aadesh Shrivastava composed the soundtrack for Baghban, with lyrics by Sameer, except for "Holi Khele Raghuveera" which was written by Bachchan's father and poet Harivansh Rai Bachchan. Bachchan performed vocals for most of the songs with Udit Narayan, Alka Yagnik, Shrivastava, Hema Sardesai, Sudesh Bhosale, Richa Sharma, Sneha Pant and Sukhwinder Singh. Uttam Singh had composed two songs for the film before he was replaced by Shrivastava, and was not credited on the film's soundtrack. T-Series released the album on 23 August 2003 to positive response from music critics; according to the Box Office India website, Baghban's soundtrack album was the year's ninth bestselling with 1.4 million units sold.

== Release ==
Baghban had pre-release publicity because of its pairing of Amitabh Bachchan and Malini for the first time since the action film Andha Kanoon (1983). B. R. and Ravi Chopra had great expectations for the film, which they targeted to family audiences. It premiered at the Leeds International Film Festival on 2 October 2003, and was released worldwide the following day. Opening during Vijayadashami, the film had competition from Yusuf Khan's action thriller Khel: No Ordinary Game and Chandan Arora's comedy-drama Main Madhuri Dixit Banna Chahti Hoon. Baghban ran in theatres for 25 weeks, becoming a silver jubilee film. (Note: A silver jubilee film is one which completes a theatrical run of 25 weeks, or 175 days.) It was released on DVD on 17 November of that year in NTSC widescreen format. The film's television rights were sold to Sony Entertainment Television for ₹80 million (US$850,000), and it premiered worldwide on television on 21 February 2004. It has been available for streaming on Amazon Prime Video since 30 November 2016.

According to journalists, the positive word-of-mouth for Baghban played an important role in the film's commercial success. It was released on 275 screens across India and grossed ₹9 million (US$96,000) on its first day, earning ₹29.2 million (US$310,000) by the end of its first weekend and ₹53.9 million (US$580,000) after running for a week. Baghban earned a total of ₹310.3 million (US$3.3 million) in India, and was 2003's fifth-highest-grossing Indian film. Abroad, the film earned ₹41.6 million (US$440,000) in its first week. After its overseas theatrical run, it grossed ₹120.8 million (US$1.3 million), becoming the year's third-highest-grossing Indian film overseas; in its year-end box-office report, The Hindu said that most of its revenue was from Asian countries. Summing up the film's gross in India and overseas, Box Office India estimated that Baghban earned ₹431.1 million (US$4.6 million), thereby becoming the fifth-highest-grossing Indian film of 2003. Adjusted for inflation, the film has grossed ₹1.55 billion (equivalent to ₹1.7 billion or US$18 million in 2026) as of 2023.

== Reception ==
Baghban received mixed reviews from critics, who praised the performances, primarily Bachchan and Malini's, but panned the chemistry between the actors and the film's story. Taran Adarsh of Bollywood Hungama gave it two stars and said that Bachchan delivered a "powerful" and "memorable" performance; Adarsh said that Malini was "elegant and conveys the pathos convincingly". Seema Pant of Rediff.com praised the film: "Baghban has a high emotional quotient. Director Ravi Chopra retains his audience's interest in the lives of Raj and Puja Malhotra. Despite some unconvincing moments in the plot, Baghban keeps the viewers involved all the way to the climax." Director and film critic Khalid Mohamed gave the film three stars, saying that it "is unthinkable without the imperishable grace and beauty projected" from Malini. However, he compared its direction to Indian television shampoo advertisements and called its cinematography and production design as "old worldly as bell bottoms".

Ziya Us Salam said, "[Ravi] Chopra, on his part, brings a rare sight to the Indian screen. Here the aged couple is, yes, aged. Yet the romance is still very much a part of their life. The ardour for physical fulfilment may have gone but the need for proximity is there." Mid-Day's Narendra Kusnur called Bachchan's performance one of his best since the 1990s, and—according to Manjula Negi of the Hindustan Times—he "carries forward the plot" along with Malini. Ram Kamal Mukherjee of Stardust wrote that Baghban remains one of the decade's finest Bollywood films; Mukherjee said that Salman Khan delivered a "seasoned" performance, but Chaudhry was a "total waste". Filmfare critic Gautam Buragohain was ambivalent about the film, enjoying the performances but finding the story "stale"; he believed the plot was based on a similar film (the 1983 drama Avtaar), and dismissed Baghban as "predictable". Omar Ahmed of Empire praised Baghban for its exploration of family values and Indian culture.

Parag Chandrabala Maniar, who reviewed the film for B4U, agreed with Buragohain about the film's similarity to Avtaar but gave Baghban a more-positive reception. Calling the first part of Baghban was "predictable" and "hackneyed", he said that Bachchan was "excellent" as Raj. The character was "conveying love, anger and pain through his intelligent eyes. Bachchan makes the film worth a watch!" According to Rajen Garabadu of NDTV, "Baghban dwells on the new generation, their false aspirations and confused priorities [...] The film is replete with its fair share of drama (sometimes a little exaggerated), song and dance sequences and a couple of blows delivered here and there. Ravi Chopra has not experimented too much. He has wisely invested in human love, affection and familial bonding to reap the rewards for him." In The Afternoon Despatch & Courier, Deepa Gahlot called the film's plot "terribly worn out" and "very 60s", but the chemistry of Bachchan and Malini (and their performances) satisfied the audience and concealed the film's flaws.

In The Times of India, Parul Gupta described Khan's brief appearance as Raj's and Pooja's adopted son as "a picture of the obedient offspring" and called the film "larger-than-life". Sify's Kunal Shah said that although he was sure that Chopra had addressed the themes in his previous work, the director "has been successful in coming up with good performances from the lead cast". Namrata Joshi of Outlook criticised the film's length and number of "family functions". She praised the performances (especially Bachchan's), and said the film "seems to have been tailormade" for his fans. Joshi said that Bachchan overshadowed Malini with his "perfect efficiency and elan", but she praised Malini's "fetching and elegant" look. K. N. Vijiyan of the New Straits Times called the film "the perfect comeback vehicle" for Malini, and Derek Elley of Variety said: "It takes stars of Bachchan and Hema Malini's stature to make the confection work, and luckily they're both up to the job, creating a palpable sense of the couple's mutual affection ..."

== Remake ==
It was remade in Kannada as Ee Bandhana, a 2007 film directed by Vijayalakshmi Singh which received critical acclaim.

== Accolades ==
Award	Category	Recipient(s)	Result	Ref.
Bollywood Movie Awards	Most Sensational Actress	Hema Malini	Won	
Bollywood Movie Awards	Best Story	B. R. Chopra	Won	
Filmfare Awards	Best Film	Baghban	Nominated	
Filmfare Awards	Best Actor	Amitabh Bachchan	Nominated	
Filmfare Awards	Best Actress	Hema Malini	Nominated	
Filmfare Awards	Best Supporting Actor	Salman Khan	Nominated	
International Indian Film Academy Awards	Best Film	Baghban	Nominated	
International Indian Film Academy Awards	Best Director	Ravi Chopra	Nominated	
International Indian Film Academy Awards	Best Actor	Amitabh Bachchan	Nominated	
International Indian Film Academy Awards	Best Actress	Hema Malini	Nominated	
International Indian Film Academy Awards	Best Performance in a Comic Role	Paresh Rawal	Nominated	
International Indian Film Academy Awards	Best Story	B. R. Chopra	Nominated	
International Indian Film Academy Awards	Best Lyricist	Sameer (for "Main Yahan Tu Wahan")	Nominated	
International Indian Film Academy Awards	Best Male Playback Singer	Amitabh Bachchan (for "Main Yahan Tu Wahan")	Nominated	
Producers Guild Film Awards	Best Film	Baghban	Nominated	
Producers Guild Film Awards	Best Costume Design	Manish Malhotra, Neeta Lulla, Vikram P., Tilakha P.	Nominated	
Screen Awards	Best Actor	Amitabh Bachchan	Nominated	
Screen Awards	Best Actress	Hema Malini	Nominated	
Screen Awards	Jodi No. 1	Amitabh Bachchan, Hema Malini	Won	
Stardust Awards	Best Director	Ravi Chopra	Nominated	
Stardust Awards	Breakthrough Performance – Female	Rimi Sen	Nominated	
Zee Cine Awards	Best Film	Baghban	Nominated	
Zee Cine Awards	Best Actor – Male	Amitabh Bachchan	Nominated	
Zee Cine Awards	Best Actor – Female	Hema Malini	Nominated	
Zee Cine Awards	Best Playback Singer – Male	Sudesh Bhosale (for "Meri Makhna Meri Soniye")	Nominated	
Zee Cine Awards	Best Female Debut	Rimi Sen	Nominated	
Zee Cine Awards	Best Re-recording	Kuldeep Sod	Nominated	

== See also ==
- Zindagi (1976 film)
