= Hema Malini: The Authorized Biography =

Biography by Bhawana Somaaya

- Author: Bhawana Somaaya
- Cover artist: Aarti Subramanium
- Language: English
- Subject: Hema Malini
- Genre: Biography
- Published: 19 March 2007
- Publisher: The Lotus Collection
- Publication place: India
- Media type: Print
- Pages: 218
- ISBN: 978-81-74366-50-4

Hema Malini: The Authorized Biography is a 2007 Indian biographical book written by the film journalist and author Bhawana Somaaya, chronicling the life and career of the Indian actress Hema Malini. It details her birth in the village of Ammankundi in 1948, her fifty-year-long cinematic and political career, and her 1980 marriage to the actor Dharmendra, with whom she has two daughters.

== Development and writing ==
Bhawana Somaaya began her journalistic career in late 1970s, when the actress Hema Malini was on the peak of her acting career. In 2001, while Malini was preparing for her new dance ballet show Draupadi, she invited Somaaya to attend the premiere to write a "thought-provoking" column about it and her. The next morning, Malini telephoned Somaaya telling the journalist that she was impressed by her column. She later suggested Somaaya write a book chronicling her dancing career. Interviewed by Anuj Kumar of The Hindu, Somaaya said, "She felt that people know the actor, the star she is but they don't know that there would be no Hema Malini without her dance and the hardships she had to go through." However, she told Malini that the book would remain incomplete if it did not detail her career in cinema as well as her personal life, an idea which the latter subsequently accepted.

== Release and reception ==
Hema Malini: The Authorized Biography was released by The Lotus Collection on 19 March 2007. It features forewords from Malini and her frequent collaborator Gulzar, dated July 2006 in Mumbai, and the cover was designed by Aarti Subramanium. The book was positively reviewed by critics, with most appreciation directed towards Somaaya's writing style. In an article for the magazine India Today, Kaveree Bamzai elaborated: "A photographer's dream girl, she is any self-respecting writer's nightmare. Bhawana Somaaya has been brave enough to go where few have gone before. And given her subject's fiercely reticent nature, she has been surprisingly successful ... The book is written in a sedate, old fashioned style but the committed reader looking for new information will not be disappointed ..." An Amazon Kindle version was released in 2014.

== Sources ==
- Bamzai, Kaveree (2 April 2007). "Dance & drama". India Today. Archived from the original on 22 June 2021.
- Kumar, Anuj (17 March 2007). "The making of a dream". The Hindu. Archived from the original on 22 June 2021.
- Somaaya, Bhawana (19 March 2007). Hema Malini: The Authorized Biography. New Delhi, India: The Lotus Collection. ISBN 978-81-74366-50-4.
- Somaaya, Bhawana (2014). Hema Malini: The Authorized Biography (Kindle ed.). Roli Books. ASIN B00PQF31BE.
