= Lokkhikantopur Local =

2025 Indian Bengali film

- Theatrical release poster
- Directed by: Ram Kamal Mukherjee
- Screenplay by: Abhra Chakraborty; Goutam Kulsi
- Story by: Abhra Chakraborty; Goutam Kulsi
- Dialogues by: Abhra Chakraborty; Goutam Kulsi
- Produced by: Sangita Sinha; Santonu Roy
- Starring: See below
- Cinematography: Ayan Sil
- Edited by: Pronoy Dasgupta
- Music by: Manish Chakraborty; Ayan Sil
- Production company: Angel Creations
- Distributed by: Angel Creations
- Release date: 21 November 2025
- Running time: 159 minutes
- Country: India
- Language: Bengali

Lokkhikantopur Local is a 2025 Indian Bengali social drama film directed by Ram Kamal Mukherjee. The film was released on 21 November 2025 under the banner of Angel Creations. Bengali politician Madan Mitra portrays the character Madan Mitra in the film as guest appearance.

== Synopsis ==
Kalyani, Maloti and Saraswati, travel daily in Lokkhikantopur Local to work various households in Kolkata. The movie highlights the life of domestic workers of urban family, their own tales of struggle and emotion, love, hatred of three different families.

== Cast ==
- Paoli Dam as Kalyani
- Saayoni Ghosh as Sarswati
- Chandreyee Ghosh as Malati
- Rituparna Sengupta as Labanya
- Kaushik Ganguly as Utpal
- Indraneil Sengupta as Ani
- Rajnandini Paul as Tiyasa
- John Bhattacharya as Atmadeep
- Madan Mitra as Madan Mitra
- Debasish Mondal as Prem
- Sangita Sinha as Aparna

== Reception ==
=== Critical reception ===
Poorna Banerjee of The Times of India rated the film 3/5 stars and wrote "Lokkhikantopur Local is worth a watch if you enjoy multi-character dramas that illuminate the quiet, unseen labour that keeps urban life running." She applauded the slow pace of the first half, the music, the performance of the ensemble cast, particularly Paoli Dam and Chandrayee Ghosh, and the genuine emotions between Kaushik Ganguly and Rituparna Sengupta. But she criticized the faulty editing, the weak screenplay that tackles multiple issues without delving deep in any single one, abrupt narrative turns and oddly placed subplots. Siddhartha Sarkar of News18 rated the film 3.5/5 stars quoted "The history of humanity, society and the world, the director holds up a mirror keeping the nanny-patient party in front, Lokkhikantopur Local should be watched by everyone."
