= Roshmila Bhattacharya =

Indian journalist and author

Roshmila Bhattacharya is an Indian journalist, author and editor, who has worked for The Times Group's publication Mumbai Mirror since 2013. Starting her career in the 1980s, she also worked for newspapers Hindustan Times, The Asian Age, The Times of India and The Indian Express and several magazines, including Filmfare, Screen and The Illustrated Weekly of India. She has written two books: Bad Man and Matinee Men: A Journey Through Bollywood.

== Biography ==
Growing up in Darjeeling and Shillong, Bhattacharya's father was an employee at the State Bank of India. She was initially wanted to be an air-hostess or an astronaut. After finishing her communication studies, her mother suggested her to be a film director or a radio producer but her father wanted her to work in advertising. Nonetheless, she decided to start a career in journalism. Bhattacharya then joined The Illustrated Weekly of India, after had a six-week internship following her meeting with the magazine's then-editor Pritish Nandy. Her part is writing for the "Idiot Box" column. She later worked The Times of India newspaper for three months and, after her internship ended, she joined Filmfare.

Bhattacharya made her authorial debut with the unauthorized biographical book Bad Man, chronicling the life and career of the actor and producer Gulshan Grover. Published on 20 July 2019 by Random House, the book received mixed feedback from critics; Prathyush Parasuraman of Film Companion said, "The book is overpopulated with names of people and films, most of which have no relevance to the narrative. In that sense, it is like living in Mumbai—overpopulated, with more stories than narratives, more characters than characterizations." Her second book, titled Matinee Men: A Journey Through Bollywood, was released on 10 December next year. Writing for The New Indian Express, Kabir Singh Bhandari described it as "an informative and exciting read" and The Free Press Journal's Alpana Chowdhury noted that "in an easy-flowing style, she sketches the career graphs of her baker's dozen, with fascinating glimpses into lives she has been privy to".

== Bibliography ==
- Bhattacharya, Roshmila (20 July 2019). Bad Man. Random House. ISBN 978-06-70092-06-2.
- Bhattacharya, Roshmila (10 December 2020). Matinee Men: A Journey Through Bollywood. Rupa Publications. ISBN 978-93-90260-08-9.
