= Mithun Chakraborty: The Dada of Bollywood =

Indian biographical book

- Author: Ram Kamal Mukherjee
- Cover artist: Vickky Idnaani
- Language: English
- Genre: Biography
- Publisher: Rupa Publication
- Publication date: 10 August 2021
- Publication place: India
- Media type: Print (hardcover)
- Pages: 206
- ISBN: 978-9391256456

Mithun Chakraborty: The Dada of Bollywood is a biographical book about Bollywood actor Mithun Chakraborty, written by filmmaker Ram Kamal Mukherjee. The book was released by Rupa Publisher in August 2021.
