= Cakewalk (film) =

2019 Indian short film

- Directed by: Ram Kamal Mukherjee
- Written by: Ram Kamal Mukherjee
- Produced by: Aritra Das
- Production company: Assorted Motion Pictures
- Release date: 17 February 2019
- Running time: 27 min
- Country: India
- Language: Hindi

Cakewalk is a 2019 Hindi short film directed by Ram Kamal Mukherjee and Abhra Chakraborty and produced by Aritra Das under the banner of Assorted Motion Pictures.It starred Esha Deol, Tarun Malhotra, Anindita Bose, Siddhartha Chatterjee and Dimple Acharyaa in the lead role. The film was released on 2019.

== Cast ==
- Esha Deol
- Tarun Malhotra
- Anindita Bose
- Siddhartha Chatterjee
- Dimple Acharyaa
