= Durgaa =

- Promotional Poster
- Directed by: Shibu Mitra
- Written by: Faiz Saleem
- Produced by: S. K. Kapoor
- Starring: Ashok Kumar; Hema Malini; Rajesh Khanna; Raj Babbar; Aruna Irani; Pran
- Cinematography: Jal Mistry
- Music by: Sonik Omi
- Distributed by: Kapur Films
- Release date: 16 August 1985
- Country: India
- Language: Hindi
- Box office: 2,00,00,000

Durgaa is a 1985 Indian Hindi-language film directed by Shibu Mitra. It stars Hema Malini in the title role, along with Ashok Kumar, Pran, Raj Babbar, Aruna Irani in pivotal roles. Rajesh Khanna made a special appearance here. The music is by Sonik Omi.

== Plot ==
Durgaa (Hema Malini), the only daughter of Dinanath (Ashok Kumar), is a soft-spoken girl who is exploited by various men in her life. At first, Durgaa falls in love Sunil Narayan (Raj Babbar) and even marries him. But she realises after marriage that her husband had married her only as an excuse to sleep with her. Durgaa sees her husband romancing and sleeping with other girls. Her husband tries to get Durgaa into trouble by hatching a plan to get her name tagged as a prostitute. She is then accused of murdering an innocent girl but seeks the help of a senior kind-hearted Jagannath (Pran) to bear her court expenses so that she can fight the injustice against her. She is introduced to Advocate Mohan (Rajesh Khanna), who has the reputation of winning every case he handles and so is hired as the advocate representing Durgaa. But Durgaa is not aware of the motive of the old man in helping her. The rest of the story is why Mohan was hired as the advocate by that old man, what the motive of the old man helping Durgaa was, will Durgaa ever forgive her husband, who murdered the girl etc. In the end Durgaa takes revenge on the devils in her life and Mohan marries Durgaa.

== Cast ==
- Ashok Kumar as Dinanath
- Hema Malini as Durga
- Rajesh Khanna as Mohan (special appearance)
- Raj Babbar as Sunil Narayan
- Aruna Irani as Sherry
- Pran as Jagannath

== Track list ==
Song	Singer
"Kuch Kehnewala Tha Main, Par Bhool Gaya"	Lata Mangeshkar; Mohammed Rafi
"Chinak Chinak"	Asha Bhosle
"Ab Naya Tamasha"	Asha Bhosle
"Sherawali Tera Darbar"	Asha Bhosle
"O Naari Dukhiyaari"	Mahendra Kapoor
"Sasural Mein Tu Hogi Akeli, Saheli Zara Datke Rahiyo"	Dilraj Kaur; Chandrani Mukherjee
"Hai Chanji Kar Deo Ki"	Alka Yagnik
