= Apna Khoon =

1978 film

- Directed by: Babbar Subhash
- Produced by: S.K. Kapur
- Starring: Ashok Kumar; Shashi Kapoor; Hema Malini; Pran
- Music by: Sonik Omi
- Distributed by: Kapoor Films International
- Release date: 11 August 1978
- Country: India
- Language: Hindi

Apna Khoon is a 1978 Indian Hindi-language action comedy film directed by Babbar Subhash. It stars Ashok Kumar, Shashi Kapoor, Hema Malini, Pran.

== Cast ==
- Ashok Kumar as Geeta's Father
- Shashi Kapoor as Ram Verma / Raja
- Hema Malini as Geeta
- Pran as Inspector Verma
- Chand Usmani as Shanta Verma
- Amjad Khan as Khan
- Anwar Hussain as Sundar
- Jankidas as Daulatram Shukla
- Chandrashekhar as Inspector Anand Chauhan
- Rajan Haksar as Chandu

== Music ==
The playback singing was by Asha Bhosle, Mohammed Rafi and Manna Dey, while the music was scored by Sonik Omi.

Song	Singer
"Hum Bachpan Ke Dono Yaar"	Mohammed Rafi, Manna Dey
"Mere Budhape Ko Tu Cash Kar Le, Mauka Mila Hai Yaara, Aish Kar Le"	Asha Bhosle, Mohammed Rafi, Manna Dey
"Sun Sajna, Kuch Aur Bhi Tujhse Kehna Hai"	Asha Bhosle, Mohammed Rafi
"Hakim Tarachand Jo Rupaiye Mange Panch"	Asha Bhosle, Mohammed Rafi
"Char Char Hai Lootere"	Asha Bhosle, Omi
"Thahariye Huzoor"	Asha Bhosle
