= Hema Malini: Diva Unveiled =

Book by Ram Kamal Mukherjee

Hema Malini - Diva Unveiled
- Author: Ram Kamal Mukherjee
- Cover artist: Subi Samuel (Photographer), Neeta Lulla (Costume)
- Language: English
- Genre: Biography
- Publisher: Magna Publishing Co. Ltd.
- Publication date: 1 January 2005
- Publication place: India
- Media type: Hard Bound, Coffee Table Book
- Pages: 285
- Awards: Best Author Award for "Diva Unveiled - Hema Malini" from Kalakar Awards - 2005
- ISBN: 978-81-7809-286-7

Hema Malini - Diva Unveiled is a biographical book about Bollywood actress Hema Malini, written by film journalist Ram Kamal Mukherjee in 2005. Mukherjee wrote it while he was working as a senior correspondent for Stardust. The book was released by Magna Publishing Co. Ltd., owned by media baron Nari Hira. The foreword of the book was written by Amitabh Bachchan.

The book is not an authorized biography of Hema Malini, but she appeared at book launch events in Delhi and Kolkata.

== Award ==
In 2006, Ram Kamal Mukherjee won the Best Author award at the Kalakar Awards in Kolkata.
