= Ram Kamal Mukherjee =

Indian filmmaker (born 1976)

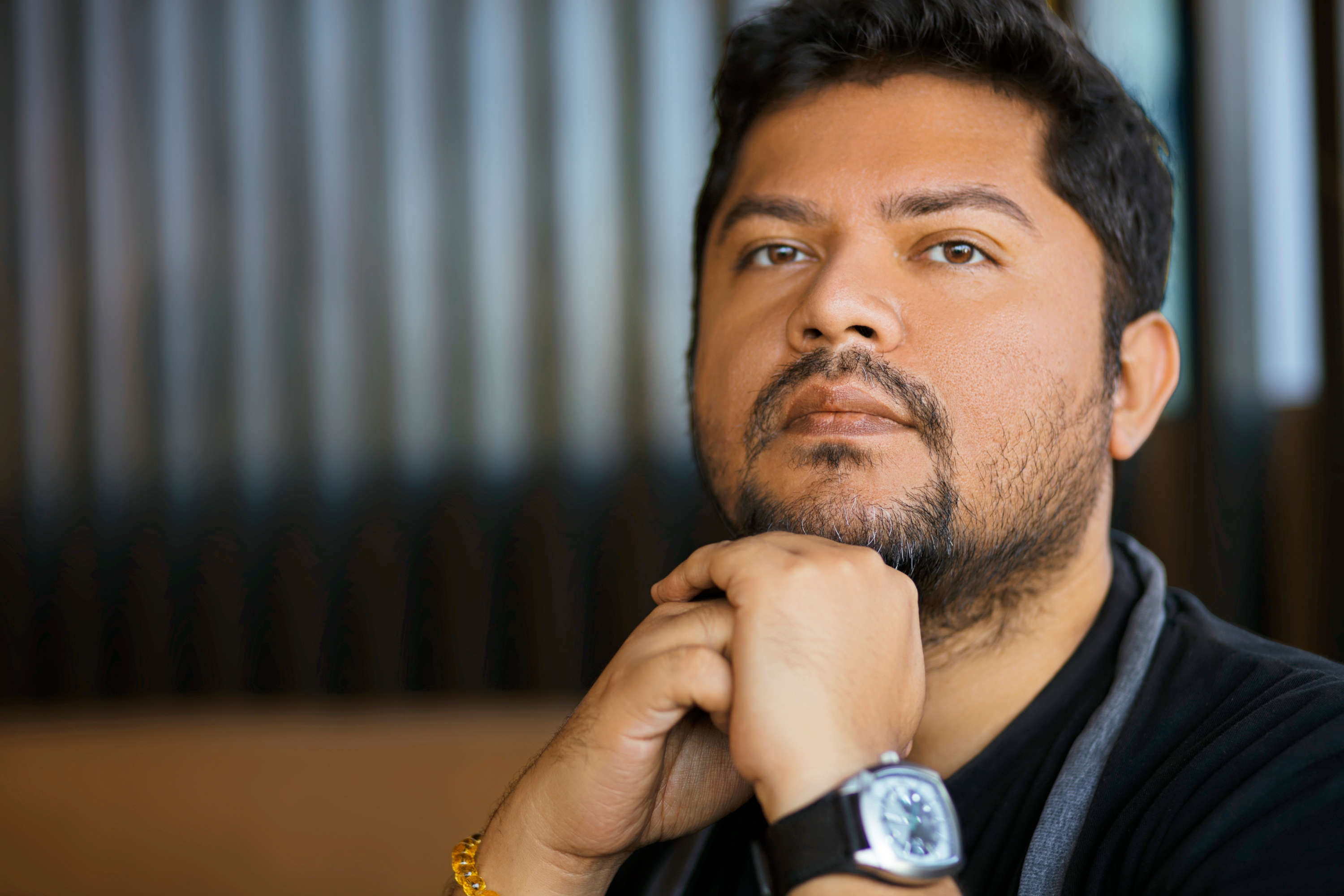
- Born: 13 September 1976 (age 50); Calcutta (now Kolkata), West Bengal, India
- Education: University of Calcutta
- Occupation: Film Director/Author
- Notable work: Hema Malini Diva Unveiled; Hema Malini: Beyond the Dream Girl; Season's Greetings; Rickshawala; Sanjay Dutt, One Man, Many Lives
- Spouse: Sarbani Mukherjee (m. 2007)
- Children: 1
- Website: Official Website

Ram Kamal Mukherjee (born 13 September 1976) is an Indian film journalist, the former editor in chief of Stardust film magazine, biographer of Hema Malini, Mithun Chakraborty and Sanjay Dutt. He made his debut as filmmaker with Cakewalk starring Esha Deol. He has been regarded as one of the best Indian short filmmaker by The Times of India. In 2023 he won 69th National Film Award for his short film Ek Duaa. He has been officially nominated under Indian Panorma for Best Debutant Director for his film Binodini Ekti Natir Upakhyan at IFFI 2025.

== Personal information ==
Mukherjee completed his graduation in History from the University of Calcutta. He completed his schooling from St Joseph's College in Calcutta, and later completed his senior schooling from Khalsa Model School. After graduation he completed a diploma course in communication from the British Council, later joined Media Studies Film and Television course in University of Calcutta.

== Career ==
Mukherjee is best known as a biographer of Hema Malini's authorized biography Beyond The Dreamgirl and India's first Power Brand Film Journalist. After working with Times of India (Mumbai Mirror) as assistant editor, he worked with Pritish Nandy Communication as vice president and wrote columns in Midday and Ananda Bazar Patrika. Later he worked as Associate Producer in Zee TV finite series Bin Kuch Kahe.

He is best known for writing India's first coffee table book on any actress, Hema Malini - Diva Unveiled, which was published by Magna Books in 2005. He was the assistant producer of the TV series Bin Kuch Kahe aired on Zee TV.

In 2019 he made his debut as filmmaker with Cakewalk starring Esha Deol in the lead role. In 2020 his film Season's Greetings, a tribute to Rituparno Ghosh fetched him national and international accolades. The film also marked return of former Miss India Celina Jaitly Haag into cinema. In 2021 he won the Best Human Rights Film at Cardiff International Film Festival for his film Rickshawala. As an author he penned six books, in English and Hindi languages. His biography Beyond The Dreamgirl published by HarperCollins India, was released by Deepika Padukone in Mumbai. The foreword of the book was written by Prime Minister of India Mr Narendra Modi.

He had also penned a biography, Sanjay Dutt - One Man Many Lives published by Rupa Books.

== Bibliography ==
Year	Title	Publisher	Notes	Ref.
2005	Hema Malini Diva Unveiled	Magna Books	Coffee table book on Hema Malini	
2016	Long Island Iced Tea	Leadstart Publishing	Fiction	
2018	Fitness Secrets of Stars	Penguin Random House		
2018	Hema Malini: Beyond the Dream Girl	HarperCollins	Authorized Biography of Hema Malini	
2019	Sanjay Dutt, One Man, Many Lives	Rupa Publisher	Biography on Sanjay Dutt	
2019	Muktaakash		Collection of Hindi poems	
2021	Mithun Chakraborty: The Dada of Bollywood	Rupa Publication	Biography	

== Filmography ==
Key
†	Denotes films that have not yet been released

Year	Title	Cast	Notes	Ref.
2018	Cakewalk	Esha Deol, Tarun Malhotra	Short Film	
2019	Season's Greetings	Celina Jaitly, Lillette Dubey	A tribute to Rituparno Ghosh, released on ZEE5	
2020	Rickshawala	Avinash Dwivedi, Kasturi Chakraborty	Won Best Director award at 13th Ayodhya International Film Festival and Cafe Irani Indo Iran Film Festival.	
2021	Broken Frame	Rohit Roy, Ritabhari Chakraborty	Short Film	
2021	Shubho Bijoya	Gurmeet Choudhary, Debina Bonnerjee	Short Film	
2021	Ek Duaa	Esha Deol	Won Best Short Film awards at the National Film Awards	
2025	Binodiini: Ekti Natir Upakhyan	Rukmini Maitra, Kaushik Ganguly, Rahul Bose, Om Sahani	Biography of the noted theatre artist Binodini Dasi	
2025	Lokkhikantopur Local	Indraneil Sengupta, Kaushik Ganguly Rituparna Sengupta, John Bhattacharya, Rajnandini Paul, Paoli Dam		
TBA	Draupadi †	Rukmini Maitra	Tribute to and adaptation of Draupadi's character	
TBA	Sister Nibedita †	Celina Jaitly	Biography film on Sister Nivedita	

== Awards ==
=== For writing ===
Year	Notable work	Awards	Category	Result	Ref.
2005	Hema Malini Diva Unveiled	Kalakar Award	Best Author	Won	
2006		Lions Club	Best Journalist	Won	
2018	Beyond The Dreamgirl	Society Icon Award	Best Author	Won	
2018	Beyond The Dreamgirl	Power Brand Film Journalist Award	Best Biographer	Won	
2018	Beyond The Dreamgirl	Rajasthan International Film Festival	Best Author	Won	
2018	Beyond The Dreamgirl	Stardust Achievers Award in London	Most Promising Author	Won	
2018	Beyond The Dreamgirl	Bengal Youth Award From West Bengal	Best Author	Won	
2020	One Man Many Lives	Rajasthan International Film Festival	Best Biographer	Won	

=== As director ===
Year	Notable work	Awards	Category	Result	Ref.
2019	Cakewalk	Midday Showbiz Icon Award	Best Director	Won	
2019	Cakewalk	Most Influential Content Professional Award		Won	
2019	Cakewalk	MTV IWM Buzz Award	Best Director	Won	
2019	Cakewalk	Society Achievers Award	Best Short Film Director	Won	
2019	Cakewalk	Kala Samriddhi Award	Most Promising Director	Won	
2020	Season's Greetings	Rajasthan International Film Festival	Best Director Award	Won	
2020	Season's Greetings	9th Best Shorts Film Festival in California	Award of Excellence	Won	
2020	Season's Greetings		Best Shorts	Won	
2020	Rickshawala	Ayodhya International Film Festival	Most Promising Director	Won	
2020	Rickshawala	Indo-Iran International Film Festival	Best Emerging Director	Won	
2020	Rickshawala	Global Film and Music Festival in USA	Best Director	Won	
2020	Rickshawala	Cafe Irani Chai International Festival	Best Emerging Director	Won	
2020	Rickshawala	13th Ayodhya International Film Festival	Best Director	Won	
2021	Rickshawala	7th Rajasthan International Film Festival	Best Director	Won	
2021	Season's Greetings	IWMBUZZ Digital Awards	Best Director	Won	
2022	Ek Duaa	IWMBUZZ Digital Awards	Best Director	Won	
2023	Ek Duaa	69th National Film Award	Best short film	Won	
