= Sitapur Ki Geeta =

- Poster
- Directed by: Shibu Mitra
- Written by: Faiz Saleem
- Produced by: S.K.Kapur
- Starring: Rajesh Khanna; Hema Malini; Pran; Raza Murad; Shakti Kapoor; Amjad Khan
- Cinematography: S. S. Pappu
- Music by: Sonik Omi
- Release date: 1987
- Country: India
- Language: Hindi

Sitapur Ki Geeta is a 1987 Hindi movie which stars Hema Malini, Rajesh Khanna and Pran. The music of the film was composed by the duo Sonik Omi. The movie, set against a rural backdrop, was most successful in the North and the East of India. Lachak Lachak Lachak Jaye Jawani is the most famous song from this film, sung by Amit Kumar and Asha Bhosle. Rajesh Khanna makes special appearance in the film as the presumably intended groom of Hema Malini. The film was dubbed into Bhojpuri and re-released in 2006.

== Cast ==
- Hema Malini as Geeta Singh
- Rajesh Khanna as Ramu (Special Appearance)
- Rajan Sippy as Inspector Karan Singh
- Shoma Anand as Pinky Shrivastav
- Pran as Dharam Singh "Dharma"
- Raza Murad as Thakur Vikram Singh
- Shakti Kapoor as Thakur Bahadur Singh
- Amjad Khan as Thakur Pratap Singh
- Tej Sapru as Teju
- Chandrashekhar as Bandit
- Om Shivpuri as IG Shrivastav
- Yunus Parvez as Pratap Singh's Munim
- Jayshree T. as Courtesan
- Chand Usmani as Mrs. Yashoda Singh
- Jankidas as Bread Man

== Soundtrack ==
The film's music was composed by the duo Sonik Omi and the songs were written by lyricist Varma Malik.

Song	Singer
"Zamana Kaisa Zamana"	Mahendra Kapoor
"Phenk More Raja"	Asha Bhosle
"Yaad Kar Yaad Kar"	Asha Bhosle
"Lachak Lachak Lachak Jaye Jawani"	Asha Bhosle, Amit Kumar
"Na Chhatri Na Chhat Na Chhappad"	Mohammed Aziz, Dilraj Kaur
"Hum Kaun Hain Kyun Aaye Hain"	Mohammed Aziz, Dilraj Kaur
