= Tell Me O Kkhuda =

2011 Indian film Bollywood Movie

- Theatrical release poster
- Directed by: Hema Malini
- Written by: Hema Malini; Mayur Puri; Ulka Puri; Anand Sharma
- Produced by: Hema Malini
- Starring: Dharmendra; Vinod Khanna; Rishi Kapoor; Farooq Sheikh; Hema Malini; Esha Deol; Arjan Bajwa
- Cinematography: Aseem Bajaj
- Edited by: Rameshwar S. Bhagat
- Music by: Songs: Pritam; Score: Sanjay Wandrekar
- Production company: Hema Malini Creations
- Distributed by: Hema Malini Creations
- Release date: 27 October 2011
- Country: India
- Language: Hindi

Tell Me O Kkhuda (transl. Tell Me, Oh God) is a 2011 Indian Hindi-language comedy drama film written, directed, and produced by Hema Malini, starring Dharmendra, Vinod Khanna, Rishi Kapoor, Farooq Sheikh, Hema Malini, Esha Deol, and Arjan Bajwa. Salman Khan makes a guest appearance. The film was released on 27 October 2011 coinciding with Diwali. It received mixed reviews from critics and was a box-office failure. The music was composed by Pritam with lyrics written by Mayur Puri.

The film bears a resemblance to Malini's first directoral venture Dil Aashna Hai (1992) and is an unofficial remake of the 2008 American film Mamma Mia!.

== Plot ==
The film tells the story of a girl named Tanya (Deol), who learns that she was adopted by Colonel Ravi Kapoor and his wife when he rescued her from a burning hospital. This leads Tanya to go on a journey in search of her biological parents.

The first man she visits is the ruler of a patriarchal district in Rajasthan, Abhay Rana Pratap Singh (Khanna), where female infanticide is common. However, it is revealed that Manjuri brought up as Singh's niece, is his actual daughter. Her nanny had hidden the truth from everyone, and even Rana Pratap had not known that his wife had given birth to a baby girl before dying in a fire.

Tanya then travels to Turkey to meet Altaf Zardari (Kapoor). Zardari and his non-Indian wife live a peaceful life, but the wife does not remember losing her baby girl in the fire that demolished the hospital where Tanya was born. Tanya helps her regain her memory of the incident and to accept her daughter's death. A heartbroken Tanya returns to India to her foster parents.

She then embarks on one last mission to find her father, this time to see Tony Castello (Dharmendra), a mafia leader. Initially doubtful of her, he meets up with his ex-flame, Susan (Malini), who is now a nun. Eventually, after a gang fight, it is revealed that Tanya is indeed the biological daughter Tony and Susan and Tony also accepts Tanya as his daughter, and the movie ends with her and her best friend (Bajwa) marrying in a church, with all four of Tanya's fathers walking her down the aisle.

== Cast ==
- Esha Deol as Tania R. Kapoor
- Arjan Bajwa as Jai Vishal Singh
- Dharmendra as Don Anthony Costello
- Hema Malini as Susan D'Mello
- Vinod Khanna as Abhay Rana Pratap Singh
- Rishi Kapoor as Altaf Zardari
- Farooq Sheikh as Ravi Kapoor
- Deepti Naval as Mrs. R. Kapoor
- Madhoo as Geeta Bhabhi
- Sudhanshu Pandey as Kunwar Virat Pratap
- Chandan Roy Sanyal as Kuki (Tanya and Jai's friend)
- Sharat Saxena as Danny
- Johnny Lever as Pandurang P.
- Meltem Cumbul as Zainab Zardari
- Richa Pallod as Sini
- Salman Khan as Himself in the song "Somebody Somebody" (Guest appearance)

== Box office ==
Box Office India declared the film a "disaster".

== Soundtrack ==
Tell Me O Kkhuda

Soundtrack album by Pritam
- Released: 10 October 2011
- Genre: Feature film soundtrack
- Label: Junglee Music

Pritam chronology
Mausam (2011)	Tell Me O Kkhuda (2011)	Desi Boyz (2011)

The music of the film was composed by Pritam with lyrics written by Mayur Puri.

Track listing
No.	Title	Lyrics	Artist(s)	Length
1.	"Someone Somebody"	Mayur Puri	Sunidhi Chauhan	4:24
2.	"Love You Dad"	Mayur Puri	Anupam Amod, Aditi Banerjee	4:17
3.	"Morchang"	Mayur Puri	Rajasthani Folk Artists, Shweta Pandit	4:20
4.	"Tell Me O Kkhuda"		Sunidhi Chauhan	4:54
5.	"Mile Na Tu"		Sunidhi Chauhan, Anupam Amod	4:22
6.	"Janasheen"	Mayur Puri	Shreya Ghoshal	5:00
7.	"Someone Somebody" (Remix)	Mayur Puri	Anushka Manchanda	3:42
