= Bhawana Somaaya =

Indian historian

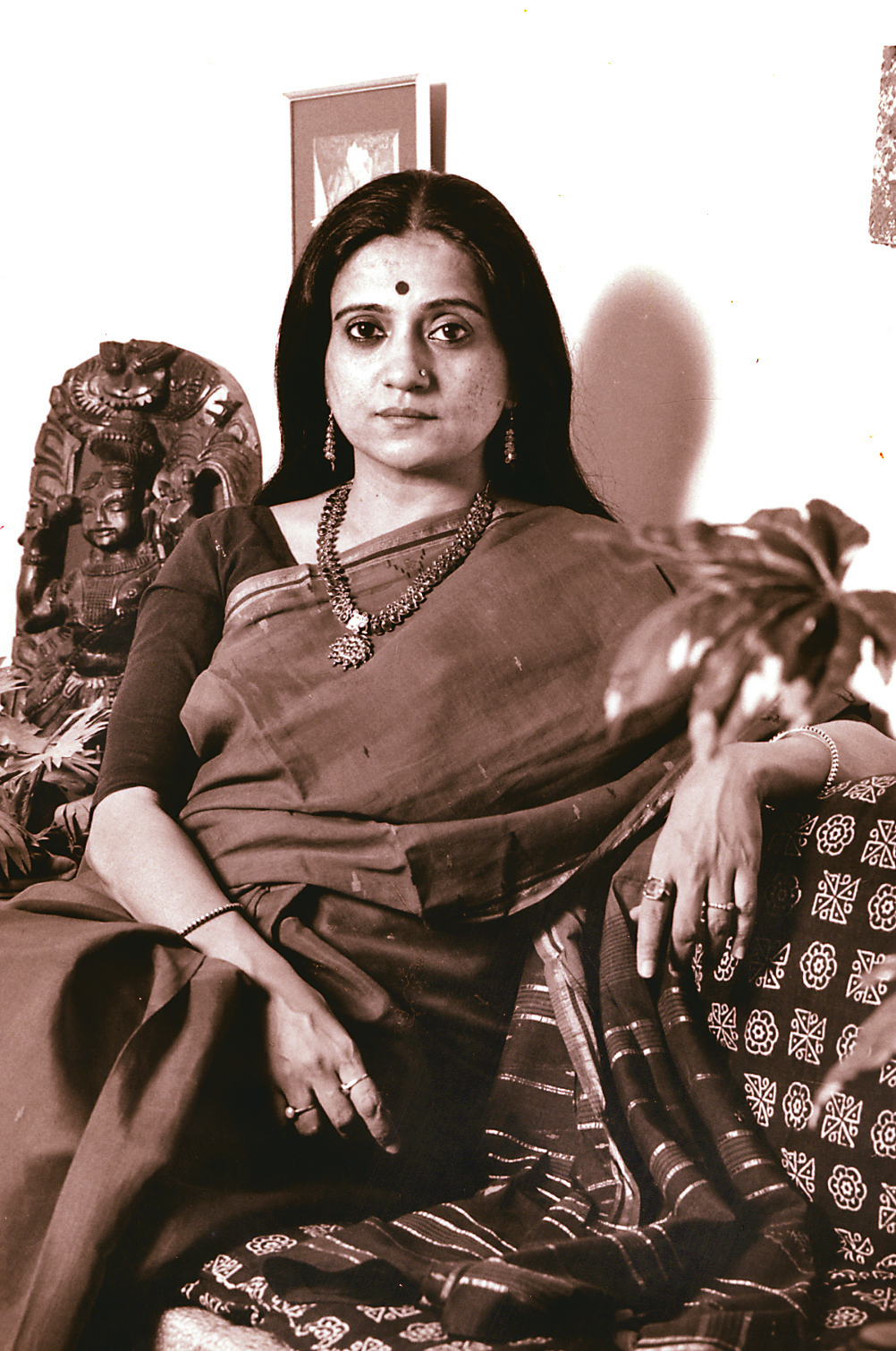
- Bhawana Somaaya in 2000
- Occupations: film critic, film historian, Editor Screen (2000–2007)
- Years active: 1978–present
- Website: www.bhawanasomaaya.com

Bhawana Somaaya is an Indian film journalist, critic, author and historian. She has been honoured with the Padma Shri in the year 2017 by the President of India Pranab Mukherjee. Starting her career as film reporter in 1978, she went to work with several film magazines, through the 1980s and 1990s. Eventually, she remained editor of Screen, a leading film magazine, from 2000 to 2007. She has written over 13 books on history of Hindi cinema and biographies of Bollywood stars, including Salaam Bollywood (2000), The Story So Far (2003) and her trilogy, Amitabh Bachchan – The Legend (1999), Bachchanalia – The Films And Memorabilia of Amitabh Bachchan (2009) and Amitabh Lexicon (2011).

== Early life and background ==
Somaaya was born and brought up in Mumbai. She is the youngest child among her eight siblings.

She did her schooling from Our Lady of Good Counsel High School in Sion, Mumbai and is also trained in Bharatnatyam dance at Vallabh Sangeetalaya in Andheri West.

After her schooling, she did her graduation in Psychology and acquired a degree in L.L.B. (Criminology) from Government Law College, Mumbai, University of Mumbai. She also studied Journalism at K. C. College, Mumbai.

== Career ==
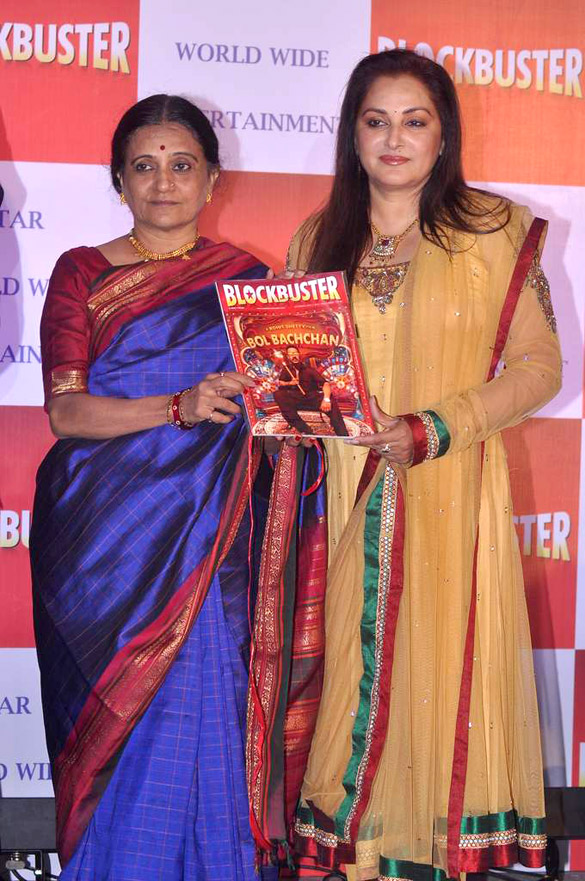
Bhawana Somaaya (left) and actress Jaya Prada at the launch of trade magazine Blockbuster, 2012.

Somaaya started her career as a film journalist and columnist with in 1978, and writing the column, "Casually Speaking" in film weekly, Cinema Journal published by The Free Press Journal. After working in Super magazine (1980–1981), she joined the Movie magazine published by India Book House as an assistant editor and became co-editor in 1985, and worked here till 1988. In 1989, she became the editor of G, a film magazine by Chitralekha Group. This was followed by her tenure as editor of noted film weekly, Screen from 2000 to 2007.

Meanwhile, she has also worked as costume designer, for actress Shabana Azmi in films like Kaamyaab (1984), Bhavna (1984), Aaj Ka M.L.A. Ram Avtar (1984) and Main Azaad Hoon (1989).

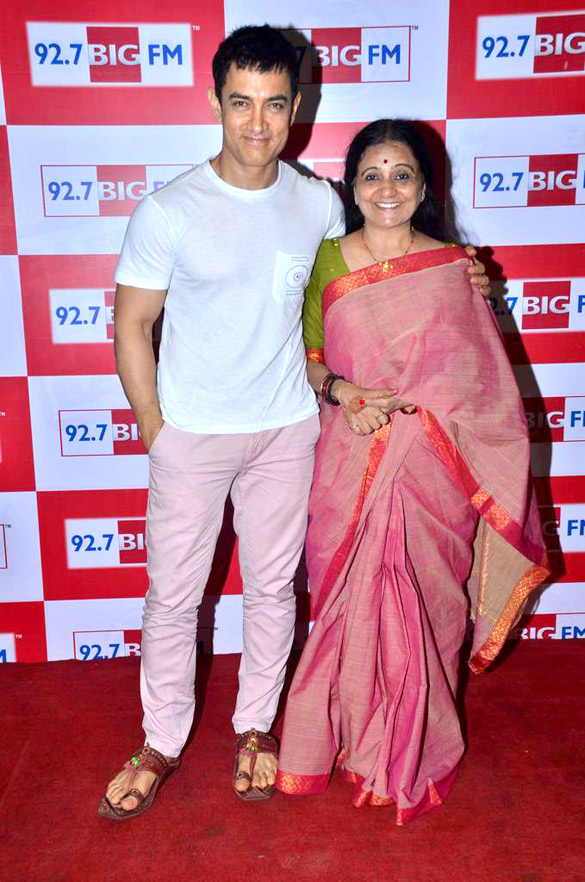
Aamir Khan with Bhawana Somaaya at 92.7 BIG FM studio to promote Satyamev Jayate series, 2012.

Over the years, her columns have appeared in publications like The Observer, Afternoon, Janmabhoomi, The Hindu, The Hindustan Times and Indian Express. In 1999, she started her career as an author, with biography, Amitabh: The Legend. This led to biographies of other film celebrities like Hema Malini, plus two more book of Amitabh Bachchan, Bachchanalia – The Films And Memorabilia of Amitabh Bachchan (2009) and Amitabh Lexicon (2011). Bachchanalia was co-authored by the Osians Centre for Archiving, Research & Development (CARD) and also included publicity material from the 40 years of his film career. She has also written books on Hindi cinema history, Salaam Bollywood (2000) and Take 25 – Star Insights and Attitudes (2002), which was released by actress Rekha at a function in Mumbai and entailed Somaaya's 25 years as a film journalist. This was followed by The Story So Far (2003) published by Indian Express and Talking Cinema: Conversations with Actors and Film-Makers (2013).

Shifting to television, in 2008, when she joined Swastik Pictures, a television production company, which made TV series, Amber Dhara as a media consultant. In May 2012, she started appearing on air, as a Friday-film reviewer, BIG FM 92.7, Reliance Media's FM radio station. In 2012, she joined Blockbuster, the newly launched film trade magazine. In 2019, she started a podcast on epilog media - #MeriKahani with Bhawana Somaaya. Currently, she is the Entertainment Editor at 92.7 Big FM Radio network.

She is a classical dancer, a podcaster and author of 19 books. Her books are a point of reference for students studying cinema at Whistling Woods, Mumbai, Manipal University, Mangalore and JNU, Delhi. Apart from books on cinema, she has also written Keshava: A Magnificent Obsession and Shaping of The Seed: The Ancient Wisdom of Garbh Sanskaar She has even translated Prime Minister Narendra Modi’s Gujarati books Saakshi Bhaav and Aankh Aa Dhanya Chhe into English as Letters to Mother and Letters to Self in 2020 and 2022 respectively.

== Humanitarian and social causes ==
Ms. Somaaya is an Advisor with an NGO called Dhai Akshar and a founder member with four others at Share & Care Foundation Mumbai.

== Works ==
- Bhawana Somaaya (1999). Amitabh Bachchan: The Legend. Macmillan India Limited. ISBN 978-0-333-93355-8.
- Bhawana Somaaya (2000). Salaam Bollywood: The Pain and the Passion. Spantech & Lancer. ISBN 978-1-897829-54-7.
- Bhawana Somaaya (2002). Take 25: Star Insights & Attitudes. Sambhav Publishers. ISBN 978-81-901354-1-2.
- Bhawana Somaaya (2003). The Story So Far. Indian Express Group.
- Bhawana Somaaya (2004). Cinema Images And Issues. Rupa Publications. ISBN 978-8129103703.
- Bhawana Somaaya (2006). "Lata Mangeshkar". In Malvika Singh (ed.). Freeing the Spirit: The Iconic Women of Modern India. New York. ISBN 978-0-14-310082-9.
- Bhawana Somaaya (2007). Hema Malini: The Authorized Biography. Lotus Collection. ISBN 978-81-7436-467-8.
- Bhawana Somaaya (2008). Fragmented Frames: Reflections of a Critic. Pustak Mahal. ISBN 978-81-223-1016-0.
- Bhawana Somaaya (2008). Krishna-The God Who Lived As Man. Pustak Mahal. ISBN 978-81-223-1027-6.
- Bhawana Somaaya (2009). Bachchanalia: The Films and Memorabilia of Amitabh Bachchan. Osian's-Connoisseurs of Art. ISBN 978-81-8174-027-4.
- Bhawana Somaaya; Jigna Kothari; Supriya Madangarli (2012). Mother Maiden Mistress: Women in Hindi Cinema, 1950–2010. HarperCollins, India. ISBN 978-81-7223-859-9.
- Bhawana Somaaya (2011). Amitabh Lexicon. Pustak Mahal. ISBN 978-8122311891.
- Bhawana Somaaya (2013). Talking Cinema: Conversations with Actors and Film-Makers. HarperCollins. ISBN 978-9350296455. Archived from the original on 9 August 2013.
- Bhawana Somaaya (2017). Once Upon A Time in India. Penguin Random House India. ISBN 9780143426028
- Bhawana Somaaya (2018). Keshava: A Magnificent Obsession. Fingerprint! Publishing. ISBN 9789387779396
- Bhawana Somaaya (2019). Chalo Cinema. Navbharat Sahitya Bhandar. ISBN 978-93-82779-07-0
- Bhawana Somaaya (2019). Shaping of The Seed: The Ancient Wisdom of Garbh Sanskaar. Aslan Reads. ISBN 978-9385898372
- Bhawana Somaaya (2020). Letters to Mother. Harper Collins. ISBN 978-9353576325
- Bhawana Somaaya (2021).On Camera Off Camera. Notion Press ISBN 978-1-63997-633-1
- Bhawana Somaaya (2022). Letters To Self – Translated from the Gujarati by Bhawana Somaaya. Fingerprint. ISBN 978-93-5440-549-5
