= Rihaee (film) =

- Promotional poster
- Directed by: Aruna Raje
- Written by: Aruna Raje; Suraj Sanim (dialogue)
- Produced by: Aruna Raje
- Starring: Vinod Khanna; Hema Malini; Naseeruddin Shah; Neena Gupta; Reema Lagoo; Ila Arun; Mohan Agashe; Pallavi Joshi
- Cinematography: S.R.K. Murthy
- Edited by: Aruna Raje
- Music by: Shaarang Dev
- Release date: 31 August 1988
- Country: India
- Language: Hindi

Rihaee (Devnagari: रिहाई, English: Liberation) is a 1988 Hindi film directed by Aruna Raje, starring Vinod Khanna, Hema Malini, Naseeruddin Shah, Ila Arun and Mohan Agashe in lead roles. The film dealt with the promiscuity of male migrant workers to urban India, and also the sexuality of women, left behind in the rural regions. Hema Malini received a nomination for the Filmfare Best Actress Award for her role in the film.

== Plot ==
The story is set in a remote village in Gujarat. Menfolk here, like in many other villages across India go to the cities to work, leaving behind their families. Mansukh (Naseeruddin Shah) after working for a long time in Dubai, returns to his native village. This is the village where all the men have gone to work in the cities. The lonely women of the village are all excited with the arrival of Mansukh and many are after him. Especially Sukhi (Neena Gupta). Taku (Hema Malini), wife of Amarji (Vinod Khanna) is a woman with an attitude. She is an independent and strong woman, who is different from the group. Mansukh becomes interested in her and he starts pursuing her for a relationship. After his persistent attempts he succeeds, and they start having a relationship. After a while, Mansukh leaves the village. The women Sukhi and Taku later find out that they are both pregnant. How they deal with their pregnancies is the subject of the movie.

This is a staggering movie that shakes some of the fundamental rules of Indian society. It talks about equal opportunity to females in all aspects. The movie starts with the introduction of the village characters through a postman (Harish Patel). Later, the movie targeting the men folk on their attitude towards women, hooks them with a common man's dream story - a man in a village filled with longing women. Then it slowly turns and develops through various threads to tell how women are differentiated in the eyes of the society, what a baby means to a woman and what is real manliness.

Jhumkhu (Ila arun) for example, loses her son in a fire accident and is forced to do the funeral without her husband, as he is not able to come to the village. She goes through that trauma all alone. She almost becomes insane on that loss, this character is later used to convey the message that whether it is an accident or an abortion, the trauma of losing a child for a woman is the same. Like Jhumku, there is a story behind every female character, and they have one problem or the other because they are women.

The movie puts the double standard followed for men and women through various village characters. Mansukh's father in the panchayat blames the women of the village to be punished, without saying anything about his son who was responsible for everything. The movie also points out the hypocrisy of the society which says it is okay to hide the truth rather than reveal it openly.

== Cast ==
- Vinod Khanna as Amar Ji
- Hema Malini as Taku
- Naseeruddin Shah as Mansukh
- Neena Gupta as Sukkhi
- Ila Arun as Jhumku
- Reema Lagoo as teekhibai
- Harish Patel as Narrator
- Mohan Agashe
- Aditya Lakhia
- Sangeeta Naik
- Pallavi Joshi
- Hilla Sethna
- Robin Gupta
- Aditya Bhattacharya... Special Appearance

== Music ==
1. "Delhi Mein Mera Dil Na Laga" - Udit Narayan, Anupama Deshpande, Kavita Krishnamurthy
2. "Mitti Mein Mil Jaana Re Bande" - Arun Ingle
3. "Puchhe Parvati Sawal Jag Mein Kyu Hai" - Udit Narayan, Anupama Deshpande, Arun Ingle
4. "Teri Meri Bairan Raat Ladi" - Asha Bhosle
