= Screen (magazine) =

Indian film magazine

- Categories: Entertainment
- Frequency: Weekly
- First issue: September 26, 1951; 74 years ago
- Final issue: March 13, 2015
- Company: Indian Express Limited
- Country: India
- Based in: Mumbai
- Language: English
- Website: screenindia.com

Screen is an Indian weekly film magazine published by Indian Express Limited. Established in 1951, it was owned by The Indian Express Group. The magazine was acquired by Star India in 2015 and subsequently ceased publication. It was relaunched in 2024.

The magazine's content focused on India's Hindi film industry, a.k.a. Bollywood, located mainly in Mumbai. It also had an e-magazine version.

== History ==
Screen was first published on 26 September 1951 with Manorama Katju as its managing editor. She was succeeded in 1959 by S.S. Pillai who died in post in 1977. The magazine was founded by The Indian Express Group.

B. K. Karanjia who was previously editor of Filmfare, remained the editor of Screen for 10 years. Udaya Tara Nayar, previously a staff writer for the magazine, was editor between 1988 and 1996 and 1998–2000. Film journalist, Bhawana Somaaya was the editor of the magazine from 2000 to 2007. In 2007, she was succeeded by Priyanka Sinha Jha, a former Society magazine and HT Style/Saturday editor.

== Screen awards ==
Screen organized and sponsored the Screen Awards for movies in Hindi cinema, established in 1995. It also sponsored Screen Gold Medal for excellence in direction at the Film and Television Institute of India, established in 1967. Star group continues to sponsor annual 'Star Screen' Awards.

== See also ==
- The Indian Express
