= Esha Deol =

Indian actress (born 1981)

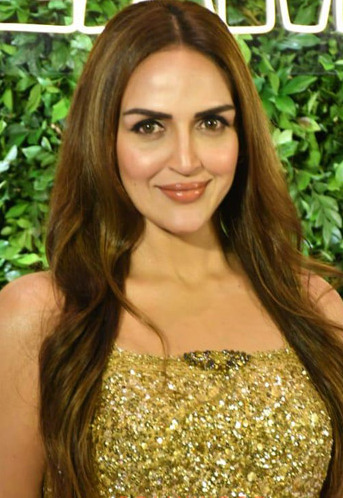
- Deol in 2023
- Born: 2 November 1981 (age 45); Bombay, Maharashtra, India
- Other names: Esha; Esha Deol Takhtani
- Education: Mithibai College, Mumbai
- Occupation: Actress
- Years active: 2002–present
- Spouse: Bharat Takhtani (m. 2012; div. 2024)
- Children: 2
- Parents: Dharmendra (father); Hema Malini (mother)
- Family: See Deol family

Esha Deol (born 2 November 1981) is an Indian actress who works in Hindi films. The daughter of actors Dharmendra and Hema Malini, Deol made her acting debut in the romantic thriller Koi Mere Dil Se Poochhe (2002), which won her the Filmfare Award for Best Female Debut.

Following a series of poorly received films, she had success in the political film Aayutha Ezhuthu (2004), the action thrillers Dhoom (2004) and Dus (2005), the horror film Kaal (2005), and the comedy No Entry (2005). This was followed by a setback and a hiatus. She returned to acting with the psychological thriller series Rudra: The Edge of Darkness (2022). Off-screen, Deol was married to businessman Bharat Takhtani till 2024 with whom she has two daughters.

== Early life and family ==
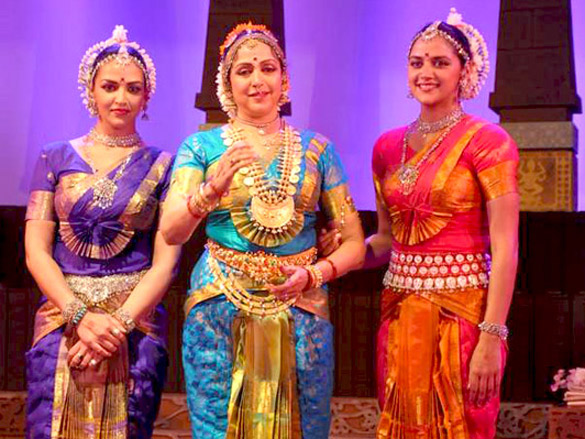
Deol performing with her mother and sister in 2010

Esha Deol was born in Bombay (present Mumbai) on 2 November 1981. She is the elder daughter of Bollywood actors Dharmendra and Hema Malini. She has a younger sister named Ahana. She is the younger half sister of actors Sunny Deol and Bobby Deol and the first cousin of actor Abhay Deol. Her father was a Punjabi Jat, and her mother is a Tamil Hindu Iyengar Brahmin. Deol is fluent in speaking Tamil, Hindi and English.

== Career ==
=== Debut and early work (2002–2003) ===
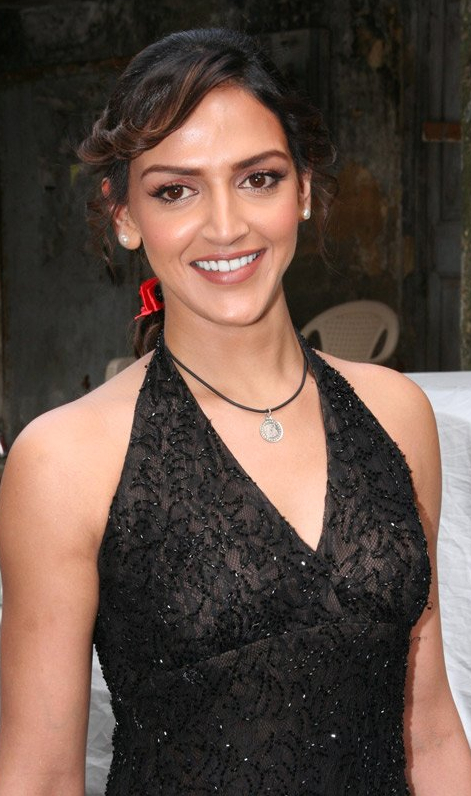
Deol at an event in 2007

She started her acting career in a lead role with Vinay Shukla's Koi Mere Dil Se Poochhe (2002) opposite Aftab Shivdasani, with Sanjay Kapoor, Jaya Bachchan and Anupam Kher playing supporting roles. The movie was a box office failure. Deol received mixed reactions from critics upon her performance. Savera R Someshwar of Rediff.com wrote "Esha, as a person, exudes a confidence that almost borders on arrogance." Rakesh Budhu of Planet Bollywood wrote "She isn't horrible, but given the hype, the demands and of course, comparisons, she surely isn't up to the mark. … Of course, she is nowhere close to being a washout and if you are her fan you can appreciate the other aspects of her performances without completely losing faith in her future projects." Despite mixed reactions and box office failure, Deol won numerous awards for her performance including the Filmfare Award for Best Female Debut at the 48th Filmfare Awards.

Deol's second film was Arjun Sablok's love triangle Na Tum Jaano Na Hum opposite Saif Ali Khan and Hrithik Roshan. Taran Adarsh of IndiaFm praised her acting and wrote "it is Esha Deol who surprises you with a mature performance. Although her looks are inconsistent, the youngster takes on the role with utmost sincerity and comes out with a natural performance. She has been better presented when compared to her debut film." Bhavna Giani of Rediff praised Deol's acting and dancing and compared it to Deol's mother Hema Malini. Deol's third and final release of the year was Sanjay Chhel's Kyaa Dil Ne Kahaa opposite Tusshar Kapoor. It was Deol's third consecutive flop but she earned critical acclaim and Taran Adarsh observed that it was her better performance as compared to her previous two films.

Deol's first two movies of 2003: Kucch To Hai and Chura Liyaa Hai Tumne were box office failures. For Kucch To Hai, Deol earned mixed reviews from Taran Adarsh, who wrote "Esha Deol shows improvement in terms of performance as well as her overall appearance." Taran Adarsh considered Deol to be "alright" in Chura Liyaa Hai Tumne.

Deol was one of the heroines of J.P. Dutta's multi starrer war epic LOC: Kargil and was paired with Abhishek Bachchan. Though Deol and all the other heroines could not get much scope, she earned critical acclaim for her performance. The film became the sixth highest-grossing film of the year.

=== Breakthrough and career struggles (2004–2008) ===
In 2004, Deol made her debut in Tamil cinema by playing a French teacher in Mani Ratnam's political film Aayutha Ezhuthu opposite Suriya. She earned critical acclaim for her performance. Sify.com defined her as "surprisingly fresh and sparkling". To prepare for her role, Deol learned nuances of the language with Mani Ratnam's assistant R. Kannan. This was the only Tamil film she ever acted in. After completing Aaytha Ezhuthu, Deol started filming the Hindi version of the movie titled Yuva. In Yuva, Deol repeated the same role and was paired opposite Ajay Devgn. Both movies were released on the same date but could not attain success. Yuva had a below average opening and flopped at the box office.

Deol finally got her breakthrough with Yash Raj Films' action film Dhoom opposite Abhishek Bachchan, John Abraham, Uday Chopra and Rimi Sen. It was Deol's first action role and she was paired opposite Chopra. The film had a decent opening and became a hit at the box office, becoming the fourth-highest-grossing film of the year. Deol did not get much scope in the film, but her performance earned her a nomination for the IIFA Award for Best Supporting Actress at the 6th IIFA Awards.

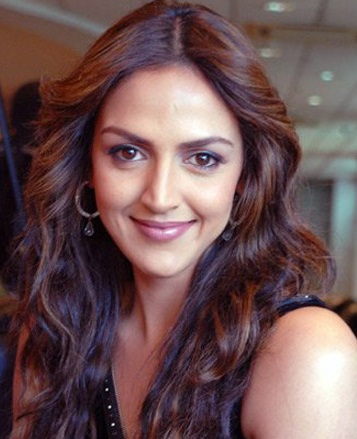
Deol at the promotion of her film Just Married

After the success of Dhoom, Deol starred in Krishna Vamsi's war film Insan opposite Akshay Kumar. It was Deol's first release of 2005. The film was a failure at the box office. Her next release was Main Aisa Hi Hoon opposite Ajay Devgn. The film was a remake of the Hollywood movie I Am Sam (2001). Deol played a supporting role and earned praise by Patcy N. Subhash K. Jha of IANS also praised Deol, writing: "Esha Deol as the fey unstable nomadic and maladjusted Maya is a mix of Zeenat Aman in Hare Rama Hare Krishna and Anooradha Patel in Ijaazat. Playing this zonked-out character Esha Deol comes into her own as an actress. Her far-way looks of pain, anger, neglect and insecurity remain with you long after the film. Yup she too has matured along with Hindi cinema."

In 2007, Deol's portrayal of a notorious and vengeful ghost for Ram Gopal Verma's Darling was reviewed positively. Her next release was Cash again opposite Ajay Devgn. In 2008, she performed her first item number in Ajay Devgn's film Sunday. She further appeared in Hijack and took a sabbatical break from films for 3 years.

=== Hiatus and television debut (2011–2015) ===
Deol's next film was Tell Me O Kkhuda (2011) directed and produced by her mother Hema Malini. She portrayed the lead role in the film opposite Arjan Bajwa with Vinod Khanna, Rishi Kapoor and her father Dharmendra playing supporting roles. Despite having many veteran actors in the film, it failed miserably at the box office and having coming back to movies with this film after three years, the film actually drowned her career even more causing a second hiatus in her career.

Deol then made her Television debut in 2015 with reality TV show MTV Roadies as one of the judges in the show. The same year she appeared in a Kannada-Hindi language film Kill Them Young. It was Deol's first film in nearly four years. The film largely went unnoticed. After this Deol went on a third career hiatus.

=== Comeback to acting and expansion to OTT (2021–present) ===
Deol made a comeback to acting in 2021 and released her short film Ek Duaa in which she acted and also produced alongside her then husband. The film was released on Voot, and it was met with mixed to positive reviews.

Deol reunited with Ajay Devgan in the 2022 web series Rudra: The Edge of Darkness which marked her comeback. In 2023, She appeared alongside Suniel Shetty in the series Hunter Tootega Nahi Todega.

== Other work ==
Esha Deol
Personal information
- Position: Midfielder

Youth career
- Jamnabai Narsee School

Senior career*
Years	Team	Apps	(Gls)
?–2001	Maharashtra		
- * Club domestic league appearances and goals

During her school days at Jamnabai Narsee School, she was passionate about football and played as a midfielder. She was the captain of her school football team, represented her college in handball at the state level. She played as a national level footballer and was also selected to play for Maharashtra in the Senior National Championship at Punjab in 2001.

Like their mother, Deol and her sister are trained in classical dance forms. Deol is a professional Odissi dancer and was also trained in Bharatanatyam.

In February 2020, Deol announced her first book Amma Mia! on Instagram. This book is a hands-on guide on parenting and children diet.

== Personal life ==
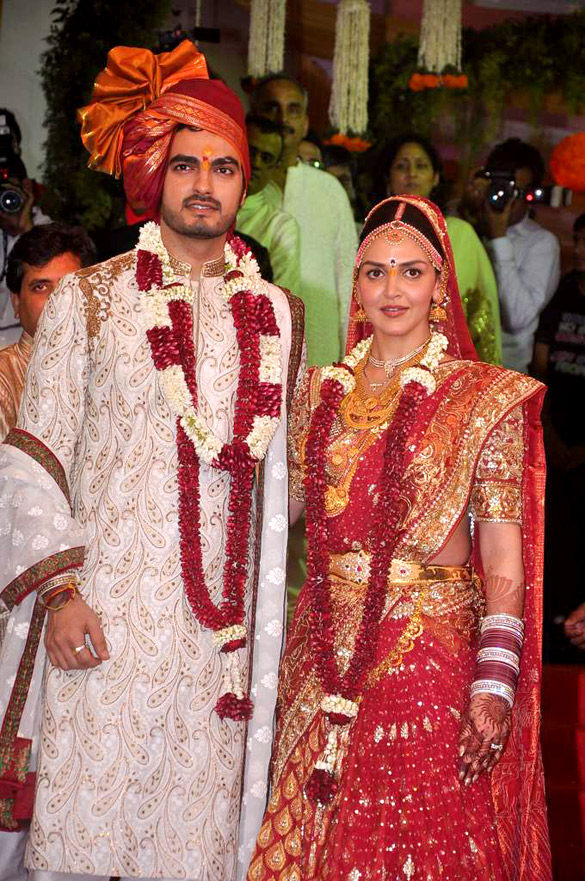
Deol with her ex-husband Bharat Takhtani on their wedding day in 2012

On 29 June 2012, Deol married businessman Bharat Takhtani in a low-key wedding ceremony at the ISKCON temple in Mumbai.

In April 2017, it was announced that the couple was expecting their first child. She gave birth to her daughter on 20 October 2017 at Hinduja Hospital in Mumbai and named her Radhya. On 10 June 2019, she gave birth to their second daughter, Miraya. On 6 February 2024, Deol and Takhtani announced their separation after 12 years of marriage.

== Filmography ==
Key
†	Denotes films that have not yet been released

=== Films ===
- All films are in Hindi unless otherwise noted.

Year	Title	Role	Notes	Refs.
2002	Koi Mere Dil Se Poochhe	Esha Singh		
2002	Na Tum Jaano Na Hum	Esha Malhotra		
2002	Kyaa Dil Ne Kahaa	Esha Kapoor	credited as Esha	
2003	Kucch To Hai	Tanya Oberoi		
2003	Chura Liyaa Hai Tumne	Tina Khanna		
2003	LOC: Kargil	Dimple Cheema		
2004	Aayutha Ezhuthu	Geetanjali	Simultaneously shot in Tamil and Hindi	
2004	Yuva	Professor Radhika	Simultaneously shot in Tamil and Hindi	
2004	Dhoom	Sheena Rai	credited as Esha	
2005	Insan	Heena Khan	credited as Esha	
2005	Kaal	Riya Thapar		
2005	Main Aisa Hi Hoon	Maya Trivedi Thakur	credited as Esha	
2005	Dus	Agent Neha		
2005	No Entry	Pooja Khanna		
2005	Shaadi No. 1	Diya Saxena		
2006	Pyare Mohan	Preeti Ahuja	credited as Esha	
2006	Ankahee	Kavya Krishna	credited as Esha	
2007	Just Married	Ritika Khanna Sachdeva		
2007	Darling	Geeta Menon		
2007	Cash	Pooja		
2008	Sunday	Herself	Special appearance in song "Kashmakash"	
2008	Money Hai Toh Honey Hai	Herself	Special appearance in song "Ta Na Na"	
2008	One Two Three	Jiya		
2008	Hijack	Saira		
2011	Tell Me O Kkhuda	Tanya R. Kapoor		
2015	Kill Them Young	Meera	Simultaneously shot in Kannada as Care of Footpath 2	
2019	Cakewalk	Shilpa Sen	Short film	
2021	Ek Duaa	Abida	Short film	
2025	Tumko Meri Kasam	Meenakshi Sharma		
2026	Pratap †	Poonam	Post-production	

=== Television ===
Year	Title	Role	Notes	Ref.
2015	Roadies X2	Gang Leader	Season 12	
2022	Rudra: The Edge of Darkness	Shaila "Shai" Durrani Singh		
2023	Hunter Tootega Nahi Todega	Divya		

== Awards and nominations ==
Year	Award	Category	Film	Result	Ref.
2003	Bollywood Movie Awards	Best Female Debut	Koi Mere Dil Se Poochhe	Won	
2003	48th Filmfare Awards	Best Female Debut	Koi Mere Dil Se Poochhe	Won	
2003	Screen Awards	Most Promising Newcomer – Female	Koi Mere Dil Se Poochhe	Won	
2003	6th Zee Cine Awards	Best Female Debut	Koi Mere Dil Se Poochhe	Nominated	
2003	4th IIFA Awards	Star Debut of the Year – Female	Koi Mere Dil Se Poochhe	Won	
2003	Sansui Viewer's Choice Awards	Most Promising Debut Actress	Koi Mere Dil Se Poochhe	Won	
2005	8th IIFA Awards	Best Supporting Actress	Dhoom	Nominated	
2007	Bollywood Movie Awards	Best Villain	Ankahee	Nominated	
2007	Screen Awards	Best Actor in a Negative Role	Ankahee	Nominated	
2007	Stardust Awards	Best Actor in a Negative Role	Ankahee	Nominated	

== See also ==
- List of Indian film actresses
- List of Hindi film actresses
