= Ammankudi =

- Village
- Location in Tamil Nadu, India Ammankudi (India)
- Coordinates: 10°38′52″N 79°16′16″E
- Country: India
- State: Tamil Nadu
- District: Thanjavur

Population (2011)
  - Total: 484

Languages
  - Official: Tamil
- Time zone: UTC+5:30 (IST)

Ammankudi is a village in the Orathanadu taluk of Thanjavur district, Tamil Nadu, India. Ammankudi, also known as Rajarajeswaram and Devi Tapovanam is situated near Kumbakonam in Thanjavur District. It is about 20 km from Kumbakonam. Presiding Hindu deities are Parvati and the Kailasanatha Swamy.

== Demographics ==
According to the latest 2011 census, Ammankudi has a population of 484 divided into 114 families. Male population is 241 and that of female is 243. Ammankudi has an average literacy rate of 71.10 percent, lower than state average of 80.09 percent, male literacy is 78.30 percent, and female literacy is 64.06 percent. In Ammankudi, 11.36 percent of the population is under 6 years of age. Out of the total population, 299 are engaged in work or business activity. 99.33 percent of the total population describe their work as their main job and the village is administered by a Sarpanch.
