= Sapno Ka Saudagar =

- Poster
- Directed by: Mahesh Kaul
- Written by: M. Natesan
- Produced by: B. Ananthaswami
- Starring: Raj Kapoor; Hema Malini; Tanuja; Achala Sachdeva; Durga Khote
- Music by: Shankar Jaikishan
- Release date: 1968
- Country: India
- Language: Hindi

Sapno Ka Saudagar (transl. The merchant of dreams) is a 1968 Indian Hindi-language film directed by Mahesh Kaul and produced by B. Ananthaswami. The film stars Raj Kapoor, Hema Malini, Tanuja and Nadira. The film's music was composed by Shankar Jaikishan.

== Plot ==
This is the story of Thakur Raibahadur Harnaam Singh (Jayant). The movie begins with a flashback from 18 years before, on a Diwali Night. Raibahadur has a year-old baby, who had been changed by a banjaran. She was threatening him to treat her well and marry her, because Raibahadur had sexual relationship with a banjaran. A man appears dressed in khakhi and a red tie and socks. He gives dreams to people suffering. He meets a banjaran girl, Mahi (Hema Malini) who falls in love with this guy, called Raj Kumar / Raju (Raj Kapoor).

In the meantime Raibahadur mistreats Ranjana (Tanuja), daughter of a banjaran and promises to her, that if nobody else does, he will marry her. Mahi feels insecure and tells villagers that she is pregnant by Raju. The panchayat tells him to marry her, but he refuses. Raibahadur comes and persuades villagers to hit Raju and Mahi. They begin and suddenly a banjaran comes in the scene and reveals the truth.

== Cast ==
- Raj Kapoor
- Hema Malini
- Jayant (actor)
- David Abraham
- Tanuja
- Nadira
- Achala Sachdeva
- Durga Khote
- Roopesh Kumar

== Production ==
Sapno Ka Saudagar is Hema Malini's first Hindi film. The title was suggested by B. Ananthaswami.

== Soundtrack ==
The soundtrack was composed by Shankar Jaikishan.

#	Title	Singer(s)	Lyricist
1	"Tum Pyar Se Dekho"	Mukesh, Sharda	Shailendra
2	"Nadan Ki Dosti"	Lata Mangeshkar	Hasrat Jaipuri
3	"Seekha Nahin Sabak Tune Pyar Ka"	Lata Mangeshkar	Hasrat Jaipuri
4	"Sapnon Ka Saudagar Aaya"	Mukesh	Shailendra
5	"Woh Zindagi"	Mukesh	Shailendra
6	"Maar Doongi Chakkoo"	Sharda	S. H. Bihari

== Reception ==
The film was a commercial failure at the box office. In 1977, Kapoor told to India Today that he dislikes the film, he also criticised Kaul's direction, and that he acted in the film for money, because "like Orson Welles, I had to act in bad films to make good ones myself".
