= Sir Padampat Singhania University =

Private university in Rajasthan, India

- Motto: Wisdom
- Type: Private
- Established: 2007
- Chairperson: Dr. Nidhipati Singhania
- President: Dr. Prithvi Pal Yadav
- Faculty: 63
- Location: Udaipur, Rajasthan, India
- Campus: Suburban, 101.6 acres (0.411 km^{2})
- Website: www.spsu.ac.in

Sir Padampat Singhania University (SPSU) is a private, residential university located near Bhatewar, Udaipur, India. The university was established by the J K Cement group of companies, and is named after the founder of the J K Organisation, Sir Padampat Singhania.

The university came into existence through an Ordinance passed by the Government of Rajasthan in 2007, which was subsequently made into the Sir Padampat Singhania University Act 2008. SPSU was conceived as a boutique university that would not have more than 1500 students.

== History ==
In 2005, the JK Cement Nimbahera Foundation envisaged the creation of a university in Rajasthan.

Sir Padampat Singhania School of Engineering was established in 2007 when the first batch of engineering students were admitted into the BTech programme. In 2007, the school was established as a recognized university, with the passing of the Sir Padampat Singhania University Ordinance 2007. This Ordinance was subsequently ratified as Sir Padampat Singhania University, Udaipur Act, 2008 (Act No. 4 of 2008) by the Legislative Assembly of the State of Rajasthan. SPSU is approved by UGC vide Notification No: F.9-8/2009(CPP-1) dated 13 April 2009 and is empowered to award degree as specified by the UGC under section 22 of the UGC Act, 1956".

== Campus ==
The university is located on a 100-acre (40 ha) campus 30 kilometres (19 mi) east of Udaipur along National Highway 76. The campus is recognisable by its distinctive white buildings, topped with yellow accents, reflecting the university's colours.

== Organization ==
The University is governed by a privately appointed 19-member Board of Management. The board includes representatives from international universities, multinational organizations and JK Cement. The university has two schools - the School of Engineering and the School of Management.

== Academics ==
Following are details of Academic programs offered by SPSU:

=== Admissions ===
Sir Padampat Singhania University admits students into its engineering and management programs via the SPSAT (Sir Padampat Singhania Admission Test).

=== Degrees ===
The university awards undergraduate and postgraduate degrees in engineering, and master's degrees in business administration.

==== Degrees awarded by the School of Engineering ====
- Bachelor of Technology (BTech) in the following streams of engineering:
  - Biotechnology
  - Computer Science and Engineering
    - CSE - Internet of Things
    - CSE - Cloud Technology and Information Security
  - Civil Engineering
  - Electrical Engineering
  - Electronics and Communications Engineering
  - Mechanical Engineering
    - Railway Transportation Engineering
  - Mining Engineering
- Doctor of Philosophy (PhD) in the following technical fields:
  - Biotechnology
  - Computer Science and Engineering
  - Physics
  - Mathematics
  - Mechanical Engineering

The School of Engineering offers an International Master's degree program. This is a five-year program conducted by SPSU and the Asian Institute of Technology (AIT), Thailand. Under this program, students spend first four years at SPSU and the fifth year at AIT. Upon successful completion of the program, students are awarded a master's degree in engineering.

==== Degrees awarded by the School of Management ====
- Master of Business Administration (MBA)
- Doctor of Philosophy (PhD) in the following specializations:
  - Marketing
  - Finance
  - Human Resources
  - Information Technology
  - Digital Marketing & e-Commerce
- Bachelor in Hotel Management
- B.Com
- BBA
- BBA - Financial Services

=== Academic collaborations ===
The university has academic collaborations and partnerships with the following institutions:

- Asian Institute of Technology, Thailand
- Association of International Accountants, UK
- Chiba University of Commerce Japan
- University of Gothenburg, Sweden
- University of Nebraska at Omaha, USA
- Mendel University Czech Republic

SPSU conducts student and faculty exchange programs, guest lectures and student enrichment programs with these institutions.

=== Corporate collaborations ===
The university has established partnerships with the following organizations to provide additional training and workshops for SPSU students and faculty:

- IBM
- Oracle
- Parametric Technology Corporation
- Sun Microsystems
- Cisco Networking Academy by CISCO Systems Inc.

=== Scholarships ===
SPSU awards full one-year tuition waiver scholarships to the best-performing undergraduate student of each academic year. Additionally, the top students from each branch of study are granted partial one-year tuition waiver scholarships.

=== SWAYAM NPTEL Local Chapter ===
The University has an active SWAYAM (Indian MOOC) NPTEL Local Chapter, which is managed by the SPOC of the University. Students are motivated for choice-based online learning along with University's syllabus.

=== Consultancy ===
The University is also involved in providing consultancy to the industry. All the departments have expert faculties which benefit the nearby industry by their knowledge.low placements

== Student life ==
=== Clubs and activities ===
Student-run clubs include:

- Cyborg: Technical
- Electronics: Electronics club
- Concept: organizer's club which coordinates on-campus events and other activities.
- Arena: LAN gaming club.
- Atom: Table Tennis club.
- ASME: ASME, SPSU Student Section.
- Blast: Music club.
- Cluster: Volleyball club.
- Command: Programming club.
- EDC: Entrepreneurship Development Cell.
- Electronics: Electronics club
- Elements: Writers' club.
- Endurance: Competitive/ recruitment exams training club
- Energy: Football club.
- Grand Master: Chess club.
- Gyrate: Dance club.
- Hackerz: Computer security club. Coordinated by Mr. Prashant Rai.
- Magnitude: Theater club.
- Motion: Cricket club.
- Power: Kabaddi club.
- Snatchers: Basketball club.
- SAE India: Automotive and aerospace club; chapter of SAE International.
- Target: Badminton club.
- Track n Field: Track and field club.
- Bracing Club:Kho kho club

The university also participates in the National Service Scheme (NSS) and maintains its own NSS cell.

=== Electronics club SPSU ===
Electronics club was established on 24 August 2011 with aim to students feels electronics and they have proved it, their project was published in Times of India, Ahmedabad edition on 19 March 2012. Members of electronics club have visited Pyrotech Electronics Pvt Ltd to get the experience of how an enterprise works.

=== Cyborg - The Technical Cell ===
Cyborg is a student-run and IIT Bombay collaborated Technical cell started in September 2011 to help students learn new technologies inside college campus and become industry ready. Cyborg has provided the following services to its student members:

- Linux workshops conducted by Aman Jain (erstwhile student at SPSU) and certified by IIT Bombay
- Robotics classes, regulated by EI Systems, Noida
- Training and mentorship by faculties regarding technical projects
- Other activities including Quiz, Website designing/hosting, Technical Extempore etc.

=== Concern - The Mentorship Cell ===
Concern is a student-run mentoring cell designed to help students adjust to college and derive maximum benefit from their time at SPSU. Since start Concern is provided with the following services:

- Admissions counseling for prospective students
- Mentoring and counseling services for admitted students
- Anti-ragging activities to maintain a ragging-free environment on campus
- Mess activities, including menu selection, off-hour snack services, etc.

== Events ==
=== Panache ===
Panache is an annual event organized by SPSU students. It includes academic conferences and cultural events and is attended by academics, corporate leaders and university students from across the country.

=== TEDxSPSU ===
The university hosts its own TEDx events, which are organized by the student-run Entrepreneurship Development Cell. TEDxSPSU events were held in 2011 and 2012 with the themes 'Order from Chaos' and 'The Times, they are changing' respectively.

=== FPGA World 2011 ===
The university hosted the 8th Field Programmable Gate Array (FPGA) World Conference in January 2011.

=== Diligent Design Content 2011 ===
The university hosted the India chapter of the Diligent Design Contest in 2011.

=== DST Inspire ===
The university conducts "Inspire", a science camp for school students in collaboration with the Department of Science & Technology (DST), Govt. of India.
