= Chhupa Rustam =

- Poster
- Directed by: Vijay Anand
- Written by: Vijay Anand; Suraj Sanim; Kaushal Bharati
- Produced by: Vijay Anand
- Starring: Dev Anand; Hema Malini; Vijay Anand; Bindu
- Cinematography: V. Ratra
- Edited by: Vijay Anand
- Music by: S. D. Burman
- Distributed by: Navketan Films
- Release date: 18 May 1973
- Country: India
- Language: Hindi

Chhupa Rustam (transl. Dark horse) is a 1973 Hindi romantic film produced and directed by Vijay Anand. The film stars Dev Anand, Hema Malini, Vijay Anand, Bindu, Premnath, Prem Chopra, Ajit in pivotal roles. The music is by S. D. Burman.

== Plot ==
The Government of India granted Rs. 50,000/- to Professor Harbanslal to conduct a study in the mountains bordering Tibet with India, called the Nangla Project. Harbanslal is sure that within these ice-capped mountains lies an entire temple made of pure gold. When Vikram Singh and his son, Bahadur, find out about the Nangla Project, they abduct Harbanslal in order to force him to reveal the exact location of this temple, in vain though and end up killing him. Having failed in this venture, they kidnap the wife and son of multi-millionaire Rajendra Jain and demand that he get Bahadur married to his daughter, Ritu. Rajendra discusses this matter with Ritu, and Ritu is ready and willing to do anything for her mother and brother. Rajendra hesitates, and soon he receives his wife's thumb in the mail. Losing no time, Rajendra and Ritu make arrangements for the marriage and communicate accordingly with the kidnappers. Soon a wedding date is fixed, however, things do not go as planned as Ritu is abducted by a man called Natwarlal and taken to his hideout. While driving there, their car breaks down and they are forced to take a lift from Jimmy Fernandes, albeit at gunpoint. Jimmy drops them off at an isolated spot, leaving Natwarlal to work out the details of getting the ransom money from Rajendra. Before that could happen, Jimmy shows up and abducts Ritu. With his wife and son still held captive with Vikram and his son, Rajendra is at his wits' end as to whose life he should give priority to. Watch as events unfold to show what exactly was the motive in Ritu's multiple abductions, who is benefit by these incidents, and its connection with the Nangla Project.

== Cast ==
- Dev Anand as Ashwini Kumar / Natwarlal / Chhupa Rustam
- Hema Malini as Ritu Jain
- Vijay Anand as Jimmy Fernandes
- Bindu as Bambi
- Premnath as Williams
- Prem Chopra as Bahadur Singh
- Ajit as Vikram Singh
- Sajjan as Rajendra Jain
- Veena as Mrs. Rajendra Jain
- A. K. Hangal as Professor Harbanslal
- Sudhir as Lawrence

== Crew ==
- Director - Vijay Anand
- Writer - Vijay Anand, Kaushal Bharati, Suraj Sanim
- Editor - Vijay Anand, Babu Sheikh (associate), Ashok Bandekar (assistant), Achyut Gupte (color)
- Producer - Vijay Anand
- Cinematographer - V. Ratra
- Art Director - T. K. Desai
- Assistant Director - Premnath Junior, Prem Prakash, Somnath Rangroo
- Assistant Art Director - Shankar Chougle, Bhaskar Deokar
- Makeup - Vasant Desai, Hariram Sharma
- Music Director - S. D. Burman
- Associate Composer - Meera Dev Burman
- Lyricists - Gopaldas Neeraj, Vijay Anand
- Playback Singers - Asha Bhosle, Kishore Kumar, Lata Mangeshkar, Manna Dey

== Soundtrack ==
S. D. Burman held the role of music director, collaborating with associate composer Meera Dev Burman and working alongside lyricists Neeraj for four songs and Vijay Anand for three songs. The song "Dheere Se Jana Khatiyan Mein" was listed at #9 on Binaca Geetmala annual list 1973.

Chhupa Rustam

Soundtrack album by S. D. Burman
- Released: 1973
- Genre: Feature film soundtrack
- Length: 31:12
- Language: Hindi
- Label: Saregama
- Producer: S. D. Burman

S. D. Burman chronology
Jugnu (1973)	Chhupa Rustam (1973)	Phagun (1973)

Songs
No.	Title	Lyrics	Singer(s)	Length
1.	"Hum Chhupe Rustam Hain"	Neeraj	Manna Dey	6:11
2.	"Dheere Se Jana Bagiyan Mein"	Neeraj	Kishore Kumar	4:16
3.	"Jo Main Hota"	Vijay Anand	Kishore Kumar and Asha Bhosle	5:11
4.	"Main Hoon Chhui Mui"	Vijay Anand	Asha Bhosle	3:24
5.	"Suno Suno Meri Dukhbhari Dastan"	Neeraj	Lata Mangeshkar	3:55
6.	"Bolo Kya Hum Ko Doge"	Vijay Anand	Kishore Kumar and Asha Bhosle	4:27
7.	"Jaloon Main Jale Mera Dil"	Neeraj	Asha Bhosle	3:45
Total length:				31:12
