= Teen Devian =

- Poster
- Directed by: Amarjeet; Dev Anand (ghost)
- Written by: Vrajendra Gaur
- Produced by: Amarjeet
- Starring: Dev Anand; Nanda; Simi Garewal; Kalpana Mohan; I. S. Johar
- Narrated by: Ameen Sayani
- Cinematography: Pratap Sinha
- Edited by: Pran Mehra
- Music by: S. D. Burman
- Distributed by: Shemaroo
- Release date: 1 January 1965
- Running time: 125.22 Minute
- Country: India
- Language: Hindi

Teen Devian (transl. Three Goddesses) is a 1965 Bollywood film directed by Amarjeet and ghost-directed by Dev Anand. The film also stars Anand in the lead role. Filmed mostly in black and white, with some colour scenes, the movie tells the story of a poet who falls in love with three women. It is inspired by writer D.H. Lawrence's works. The music was composed by S. D. Burman, whose son Rahul Dev Burman composed the English version of this film titled "Oh Boy and Three Girls", but the print was never released.

== Plot ==
Teen Devian starts off to a commentary by Ameen Sayani, as the camera moves through Calcutta's streets, the pretty Nanda (Nanda) finds herself, as she sees it, being followed. The man, Dev Dutt Anand (Dev Anand) has been sitting in the bus beside her, and has bought a ticket for Dalhousie (after she's bought one) and has now even followed her into the boarding house where she lives. At this point, Nanda loses her temper and yells at Dev, threatening to call the police. Instead, her shouting attracts the attention of the boarding house's owners, Mr Pinto (Harindranath Chattopadhyay) and his wife (Ruby Myers). Mr. and Mrs. Pinto assure Nanda that she's misunderstood, this Dev being their new lodger. Nanda is sheepish and embarrassed. But Dev forgives her readily, with a remark quite apparently aimed at her, though he's in his room and she's in hers, watching each other only through a gap.

Within two days, the individuals establish a close friendship, during which Dev exhibits affectionate behavior toward Nanda, including flirtation, polite treatment, and a countryside day trip.

Meanwhile, Dev starts working at Merry Musical Stores. His boss, I. S. Johar flies off the handle when Dev turns up late on the very first day. But one day, I. S. Johar happens to come across a poem that Dev's written and is so impressed that he quickly forgives Dev and all his shortcomings and prays that Dev's poems will soon get published. Hopefully, some of Dev's subsequent fame will rub off onto Merry Musical Stores too.

One evening, Dev's sitting on a bench in a park when a passing car goes hurtling through a puddle, and Dev is liberally splashed. He calls out to the driver Kalpana (Kalpana) that something's fallen off her car. Curious, she reverses, then gets out of the car to have a look around. This giving Dev an opportunity to have his revenge for the drenching he received. He's been fiddling with a hosepipe all this while, and now turns it on her, leaving her wet and furious. Even worse, when she gets into her car and tries to start it, it won't start. Soon, a bunch of stragglers gather around. Instead of helping her, they spend all their time ogling at her and passing comments. Finally, Dev takes pity on her and offers to attend to her car; the engine kicks in immediately, and Dev takes it upon himself to drive her back home. She makes it quite clear that she doesn't want his help, but Dev insists, and leaves her with no option but to agree. By the time he reaches her house – having draped his coat over her wet and shivering shoulders – this mysterious lady is rather more kindly disposed towards Dev, though she doesn't show it. However, when he's gone and she's changing her wet clothes, she looks fondly down at his coat and sees his notebook of poems sticking out of the pocket. She goes through it.

Next day, I. S. Johar has a piece of very good news to share with Dev, his book of poems has been accepted by a publisher and the first proof copies have arrived. I. S. Johar sends out copies to some of Merry Musical Stores' clients. One of these is the wealthy and influential socialite Radharani "Simi" (Simi Garewal). Simi receives a copy of Dev's book of poems and is completely bowled over by them. Dev happens to come to her home to deliver a piano and tune it for her while she's reading his book, and Dev owns up to being the poet. Then, a couple of days later, a lady resurfaces in Dev's life: the unknown woman to whom he had lent his coat. It turns out that this woman is Kalpana (Kalpana), and she's a famous actress. Her life is a whirl of men trying to flatter her, making promises of laying their hearts at her feet, and so on. Dev's failure to even recognise her has endeared him to her. She likes his candour, and the fact that he treats her as a friend, not as an idol. She even buys him a new coat, which she hands over to him in the car, insisting that he should wear it instead of his old coat. And that isn't the only time they meet. One day, Kalpana wheedles Dev into accompanying her for a shoot in the countryside. They have a minor mishap along the way, the car goes into a ditch, and Dev and Kalpana spend an interesting day getting to know the locals. A few days later, Simi sends an invitation to a party at her home. Dev is reluctant to go, but I. S. Johar persuades him. Simi is vastly influential; she knows everybody worth knowing. She can give his writing career the boost it needs. Dev must go, and so he does. He is an instant success. And he manages to convince both Simi and Kalpana that he is singing only for them. At a party, Dev gets drunk so much that Simi has to drop him to his boarding house. Nanda notices Dev and helps him upstairs to his apartment. Next morning, Nanda gets angry with Dev over his drunkenness the earlier night. Dev apologises and takes Nanda to the countryside, where Nanda proposes to Dev. Dev asks her to wait till the right time comes. One evening, genteel Simi, who is eager to spend money on Dev, to further enhance his career, convinces Dev to participate in a Mushaira at Srinagar, which is to be aired on All India Radio. After a few days, they reach Srinagar to participate in the mushaira, where Dev performs perfectly. Later at night, when both of them are sitting in Shikara at Dal Lake, Simi asks Dev to come to Gulmarg. There, she proposes to Dev, but Dev asks her to give him 4 to 7 days to answer. On returning from Gulmarg, at the hotel in Srinager, Dev finds Kalpana with sadness in her eyes, which he correctly guesses to be loneliness. Kalpana admits it to him, that, she has seen the superficiality of the life that surrounds her, and she longs for someone to truly understand her, as a person, not just a beautiful face. Even here, Dev asks her to give 4 to 7 days to answer. Returning from Srinagar, Dev is in a lot of confusion about the three ladies, Teen Devian, and knowing well that he cannot marry three women in this country, he goes to a hypnotist who helps him imagine his future married life with first Kalpana, and then Simi; which are both disastrous. This is the only portion of the black and white film which is in color. Then he imagines Nanda going out of his life, giving him freedom to do as he wants, making him realise that he doesn't want to lose her; and he goes after her, shouting Nanda, Nanda! He then wakes up out of the hypnosis, and a confused and uncertain Dev becomes sure and finally makes up his mind and chooses Nanda as his life-partner.

== Cast ==
- Dev Anand as Devdutt Anand
- Nanda as Nanda
- Kalpana as Kalpana
- Simi as Simi/Radha Rani
- I. S. Johar as I. S. Johar
- Harindranath Chattopadhyaya as Mr. Pinto
- Sulochana as Mrs. Pinto
- Rashid Khan as Hypnotist
- Jankidas as Bhutta (Maize) seller
- Dhanna
- Funny Tincher (as Funny)
- Ravikant
- Rinkoo
- Lateef
- Wajid Khan
- Ratan Gaurang
- Ameen Sayani as Narrator/Commentator (voice)

== Production ==
Although Amarjeet was credited as the director, Dev Anand revealed that he ghost-directed the film, thus marking his first attempt at direction, before making his official directorial debut with Prem Pujari (1970).

Saira Banu was offered one of the female lead roles, but she declined.

A sequence where Dev Anand and Simi's characters attend a mushaira is set in Kashmir, but the mushaira setting on houseboat was recreated at Mehboob Studio in Bombay.

== Soundtrack ==
The music was composed by S.D.Burman. There are six songs in the album. Lyrics were penned by Majrooh Sultanpuri. The soundtrack for English version of the film was composed by S.D.Burman's son R.D.Burman but the print was never released.

Song(s)	Singer(s)	Length(s)	Raga
1. "Are Yaar Meri Tum Bhi Ho"	Kishore Kumar, Asha Bhosle	6:28	
2. "Khwab Ho Tum Ya Koi Haqeeqat"	Kishore Kumar	6:09	
3. "Likha Hai Teri Ankhon Me"	Kishore Kumar, Lata Mangeshkar	4:10	
4. "Uff Kitni Thandi Hai Ye Rut"	Kishore Kumar, Lata Mangeshkar	3:11	
5. "Aise To Na Dekho"	Mohd. Rafi	3:44	Gara
6. "Kahin Bekhayal Ho Kar"	Mohd. Rafi	6:10	
