= Zaheeda Hussain =

Indian actress (born 1944)

- Born: 9 October 1944 (age 81); Bombay, Bombay Presidency, British India
- Other name: Zaheeda
- Occupation: Actress
- Known for: • Anokhi Raat • Prem Pujari • Gambler
- Spouse: Kesri Nandan Sahay
- Children: 2, including Nilesh Sahay
- Relatives: See Dutt family

Zaheeda Hussain (born 9 October 1944), commonly known by her mononym Zaheeda, is a former actress of Hindi films. Born in Mumbai, she is the daughter of Akhtar Hussain, who was a film producer and the son of director Jaddanbai. Actress Nargis was her aunt and character actor Anwar Hussain her uncle.

Zaheeda is best known for Anokhi Raat (1968), Gambler (1971) and Prem Pujari (1970). Dev Anand offered her the role of Jasbir/Janice in the cult-film Hare Rama Hare Krishna (1971) but she was reluctant to play the leading actor's sister, and turned it down, preferring to play the role of his beloved (eventually played by Mumtaz). The sister role was accepted by Zeenat Aman, which catapulted her to fame. Zaheeda continued to play the heroine in a few films during the early 1970s, with newer actors of the time such as Vinod Mehra and Rakesh Pandey, but they all flopped, and she eventually retired from films.

== Personal life ==
Zaheeda Hussain later married a businessman, Kesri Nandan Sahay and retired from the film industry. They have two sons, Brajesh Sahay and Nilesh Sahay.

Brajesh is a businessman registered with the Ministry of Corporate Affairs (MCA), bearing DIN 00176726 currently associated with 7 Companies and is director with Sahaya Classic Ventures Private Limited, Sahaya Properties And Investment Private Limited, Ywait Online Solutions Private Limited, Minakshi Business Services Centre Private Limited, Indian Media Entertainment And Network Private Limited. The total paid-up capital of all companies where Brajesh holds active positions is ₹77,103,200.00. Brajesh was previously associated with Miles International Exim Private Limited. Nilesh made his feature film debut with choreographer Ganesh Acharya's Angel in 2011.

== Selected filmography ==
Year	Film
1968	Anokhi Raat
1970	Prem Pujari
1971	Gambler
1973	Teen Chor
