= Tipperah Palace =

Historical palace in Comilla, Bangladesh

- ত্রিপুরা রাজবাড়ি
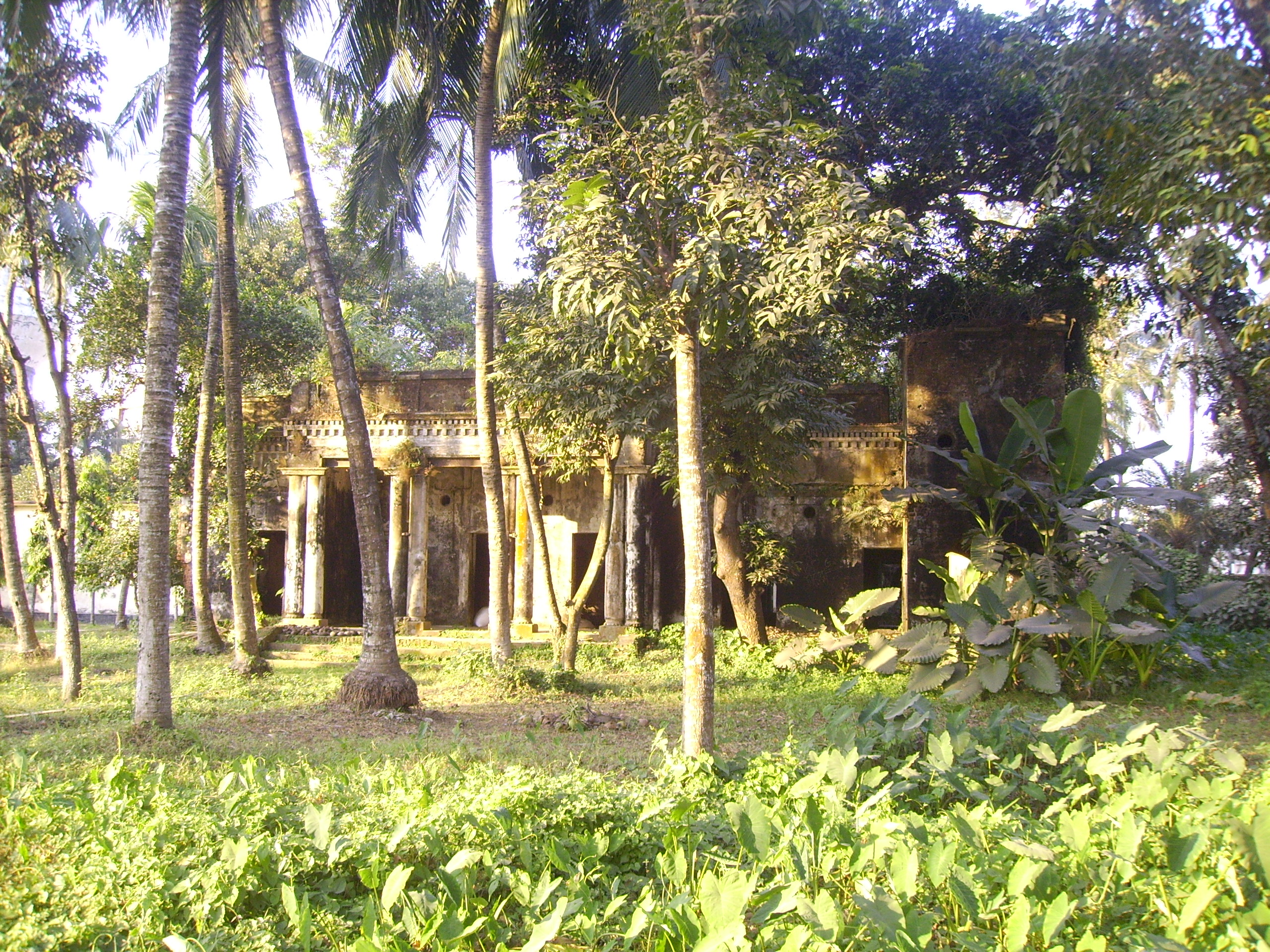
- Tipperah Palace in 2006
- Interactive map of the Tipperah Palace area

General information
- Status: Open
- Type: Residence (19–20th century); Government subject (1947–present)
- Location: Thira Pukur Road, East Chartha, Comilla, Bangladesh
- Coordinates: 23.456092°N 91.188428°E
- Completed: 19th century
- Client: Nabadwipchandra Dev Burman
- Owner: Ministry of Cultural Affairs

Technical details
- Floor count: 1

Design and construction
- Known for: Ancestral home and birthplace of Sachin Dev Burman

The Tipperah Palace (Bengali: ত্রিপুরা রাজবাড়ি), also known as Comilla Rajbari (Bengali: কুমিল্লা রাজবাড়ি), is the former residential palace of Manikya dynasty, rulers of the princely state of Tripura, built by Nabadwipchandra Dev Burman in the 19th century. It housed the military warehouse, government offices and poultry farm under the Department of Livestock Services from 1947 to 2010s. At present, it is under the process of conversion to a museum, which is located in Comilla District, Bangladesh.

== History ==
Ishan Chandra Manikya died in 1862 after ruling Tripura kingdom for 13 years. After Ishan Chandra Manikya's death, his eldest son was supposed to become the king, but Bir Chandra Manikya, his brother, usurped the throne and became the next king of the kingdom. Ujjayanta Palace official Shri Kailas Singh then advised Ishan Chandra Manikya's children to move to neighboring Comilla, Tipperah District of Bengal Presidency, one of them was Nabadwipchandra Dev Burman who moved there with his family in 1870. He built a house to live in the East Chartha area there, the expenses of which were borne by his uncle Bir Chandra Manikya.

In 1947, after the partition of India, Comilla became part of the province of East Bengal of the Dominion of Pakistan. As a result, all the members of the Manikya dynasty living in Comilla left the city and migrated to India and the government of Pakistan acquired the house, it was used as a warehouse for the Pakistan Army until 1958. After that, it has since been used as a training center for veterinarians. Later in 1965, the government established a poultry farm on the land of Tipperah Palace. In 1982, cultural activists in the city demanded that the farm be removed from the house's premises, but this was not done. It was converted into the government farm office and the residence of the farm manager after 1985. Then the Department of Livestock Services renovated the building. This house has not been renovated or cared for since the renovation for long time. A report on the condition of the palace was aired on Maasranga Television in 2013. The district authority of Comilla noticed the report, which resulted in the authority taking ownership of the house and renovating it the following year.

== Legacy ==
It is the ancestral home and birthplace of Sachin Dev Burman, a Tripuri singer, who was born on 1 October 1906. Kazi Nazrul Islam, Bengali poet and known as the national poet of Bangladesh, stayed in this house when he visited Comilla. In 1983, Comilla Nazrul Council installed a memorial plaque on the wall of the house which reads "Kazi Nazrul Islam used to practice music in this house with Sachin Dev Burman". In 2017, the Department of Archaeology declared it as one of the archaeological heritage sites in the country. On 31 December 2020, a mural of Sachin Dev Burman was inaugurated at the Tipperah Palace area. A three-day fair is organized every year in front of Comilla Rajbari on the occasion of Sachin Dev Burman's birth anniversary.

== Future plans ==
In 2012, Sheikh Hasina, former prime minister of Bangladesh, during her visit to the Indian state of Tripura promised to convert the Tipperah Palace into a museum. In 2016, Asaduzzaman Noor, the then minister of Cultural Affairs, announced that a music archive would be established in the house. A. K. M. Bahauddin, member of parliament for Comilla-6, informed in 2022 that ৳1.1 crore was allocated to convert the building into a cultural complex.
