= Shobha Nihalani =

Indian author

- Born: India
- Occupation: Novelist
- Website: www.shobhanihalani.com

Shobha Nihalani is an Indian author of adventure and thriller novels: The Silent Monument, the NINE trilogy, Unresolved – A psychological thriller, Trikon – a medical sci-fi thriller, and The Blue Jade. Recently, she wrote two non-fiction books, a biography of a humanitarian and spiritual leader – Dada Vaswani – A Life in Spirituality, and a memoir, A Gift from Above – Haresh and Harini’s Journey in Adoption. Her debut novel, Karmic Blues, was translated and published in Denmark. In 2021, she wrote a self-help book named Reboot Reflect Revive Self-Esteem In A Selfie World. This book demonstrates compellingly why self-esteem is basic to psychological health, professional achievement, personal happiness and positive relationships.

On June 23, 2021, she became a Tedx Speaker and shared her views on the topic- "Don't let anyone else write your story." Apart from being a successful writer, Shobha is also an International Coaching Federation (USA) approved InnerMost Shift Coach and she brings about a deep shift from within in her clients and help them move from a stuck state to a more progressive state.

Her NINE trilogy was a unique interpretation of the Unknown Nine legend. Unlike the original legend, her interpretation reveals some members of the Unknown Nine to be women. The Nine trilogy weaves past and future events to reveal how the Nine have guided humanity toward its destiny. Her debut novel, Karmic Blues, was first published in Danish by EC-Edition in 2008, although it was originally written in English.

Her novel The Blue Jade, is an adventure concerning historical artifacts that fall into the wrong hands set against the historical backdrop of the legendary princess-saint Mirabai.

According to her website she has previously worked as a freelance journalist, copywriter, bookkeeper, English teacher and salesperson. She recently co-wrote the screenplay for Squad with Director Nilesh Sahay. With her 25 years of writing experience, she has launched her venture named S. N. Consulting where she offers ghost-writing services, consulting in fiction, creative nonfiction writing, and feedback on writing projects. Her coaching services are flexible and tailored to goals and skill level of the clients. Whether one wants to develop a novel, structure a manuscript, write your biography, or need to brainstorm ideas for their book, or even write blog posts, she helps in that. She has worked with a number of upcoming authors offering support and guidance with editorial feedback. She also provides workshops on writing and is available as a speaker on the various topics related to writing and her books.

== Personal life ==
Nihalani currently lives with her family in Hong Kong and often visits India.
