= Peddintalludu =

- Theateral Release Poster
- Directed by: Sarath
- Written by: Omkaar (dialogues)
- Screenplay by: Sarath
- Story by: P. Vasu
- Based on: Professor (1962)
- Produced by: T. R. Tulasi
- Starring: Suman; Nagma; Mohan Babu; Vanisri
- Cinematography: Y. Maheedra
- Edited by: Murali-Ramaiah
- Music by: Raj–Koti
- Production company: Sri Annapurna Cine Chitra
- Release date: 1991
- Running time: 126 mins
- Country: India
- Language: Telugu

Peddintalludu (transl. Big house son-in-law) is a 1991 Indian Telugu-language comedy film directed by Sarath. It stars Suman, Nagma, Mohan Babu, Vanisri with music composed by Raj–Koti. It is produced by T. R. Tulasi under the Sri Annapurna Cine Chitra banner. The film is a remake of the 1962 Hindi film Professor which had earlier been remade in Telugu in 1969 as Bhale Mastaru.

== Cast ==
- Suman as Raja
- Nagma as Geeta
- Mohan Babu as Goodala Kanna Rao
- Vanisri as Bala Tripura Sundari
- Prathapachandran as Viswanatham
- Babu Mohan as Srinivasa Rao
- Bhimeswara Rao as I.G.
- K. K. Sarma as Head Constable Venkataswamy
- Potti Prasad as Lakshman Rao
- Chidatala Appa Rao as Constable
- Dham as Constable
- Dubbing Janaki as Raja's mother
- Master Amith as Tinku
- Baby Vijayalakshmi as Pinky

== Music ==
Peddinti Alludu

Film score by Raj–Koti
- Released: 1991
- Genre: Soundtrack
- Length: 21:03
- Label: R.K. Recording Company
- Producer: Raj–Koti

Raj–Koti chronology
Mamagaaru (1991)	Peddinti Alludu (1991)	Shiva Shakti (1991)

Music was composed by Raj–Koti. Lyrics were written by Veturi. Music released on R.K. Recording Company.

S. No.	Song title	Singers	length
1	"Zindabad Jeevitham"	S. P. Balasubrahmanyam	4:53
2	"Kannu Kottu"	S. P. Balasubrahmanyam, Chitra	4:12
3	"Johare Bhaama"	S. P. Balasubrahmanyam, Chitra	3:28
4	"Abbalalo"	S. P. Balasubrahmanyam, Chitra	3:54
5	"Kalle Moodata"	S. P. Balasubrahmanyam, Chitra	4:36
