= Keir Beck =

Australian stuntman

- Born: 1 January 1970 (age 56)
- Occupation: Stuntman
- Years active: 1995–present
- Spouse: Clancy Beck

Keir Beck is an Australian stuntman and film director based on the Gold Coast. He works out of, and is founder of, the stunt training venue AP8.

Keir Beck is known for his work on Mad Max: Fury Road (2015), Casino Royale (2006) and San Andreas (2015).

== Life and career ==
Keir grew up in Perth, Western Australia. He moved to the Gold Coast where he joined the film and television industry.

His experience with rope access as an arborist and rock climber gained him a reputation in the industry as a stunt rigger.

He spent eight months in the Namibian desert filming Mad Max: Fury Road, for which he won a Screen Actors Guild Award for Outstanding Performance by a Stunt Ensemble in a Motion Picture, two Taurus Awards for Best Stunt Rigging and Best Stunt Coordination and/or 2nd Unit Direction and an OFTA Film Award for Best Stunt Coordination. Most recently Keir received the SAG award for Outstanding Performance by a Stunt Ensemble in a Motion Picture for Hacksaw Ridge. He recently worked on the Bollywood film Squad, while it was shooting in Minsk, Belarus.

== Filmography ==
- Squad - Stunt coordinator
- In Like Flynn - 2nd unit Director, stunt coordinator
- Flammable Children - Stunt coordinator
- Bleeding Steel - 2nd Unit Director, stunt coordinator
- Pirates of the Caribbean: Dead Men Tell No Tales – Key Stunt Rigger 2017
- Hacksaw Ridge – Stunt Coordinator 2016
- Max Steel – Utility Stunts 2016
- The Nice Guys – Stunt Rigging Coordinator 2016
- The Darkness – Key Stunt Rigger 2016
- Gifted (Short) – Action Coordinator, Stunt Coordinator 2015
- Insidious: Chapter 3 – Utility Stunts 2015
- San Andreas – Camera Operator, Stunts, Utility Stunts 2015
- Mad Max: Fury Road – Stunt Coordinator, Stunt Rigging Coordinator 2015
- Jupiter Ascending – Stunt Rigging Coordinator 2015
- Last Days in the Desert – Stunt Coordinator (key stunt rigger) 2015
- Mental – Key Stunt Rigger 2012
- Sherlock Holmes: A Game of Shadows – Stunt Performer, Stunt Rigging Coordinator (uncredited) 2011
- Killer Elite – Key Stunt Rigger (uncredited), Stunt Rigging Coordinator (uncredited) 2011
- Yogi Bear – Camera Department 2010
- Daybreakers – Assistant Stunt Coordinator 2009
- X-Men Origins: Wolverine – Camera Operator 2009
- Knowing – Camera Operator 2009
- Push – Key Stunt Rigger 2009
- Australia – Camera Operator 2008
- The Condemned – Stunt Rigger 2007
- Ghost Rider – Key Stunt Rigger (as Kier Beck) 2007
- Casino Royale – Stunt Rigger (uncredited), Stunts 2006
- The Marine – Stunt Rigger 2006
- Superman Returns – Stunt Performer 2006
- Kokoda: 39th Battalion – Stunts 2006
- Voodoo Lagoon – Assistant Stunt Coordinator 2006
- The Great Raid – Stunt Performer 2005
- House of Wax – Key Stunt Rigger 2005
- Son of the Mask – Key Stunt Rigger, Stunt Performer 2005
- Lakshya – Assistant Stunt Coordinator 2004
- Monster – Stunts (uncredited) 2003
- Peter Pan – Key Stunt Rigger, Stunt Performer 2003
- The Matrix Revolutions – Stunts 2003
- The Matrix Reloaded – Stunts 2003
- Kangaroo Jack – Stunt Performer 2003
- Dirty Deeds – Stunt Double 2002
- Scooby-Doo – Stunt Rigger 2002
- Queen of the Damned – Stunt Rigger 2002
- Cubbyhouse – Stunts Rigger 2001
- Crocodile Dundee in Los Angeles – Thug 2001
- Yolngu Boy – Assistant Stunt Coordinator 2001
- Pitch Black – Stunt Rigger 2000
- Diamondbacks (Video) – Stunt Double 1999
- Night Wings – Key Stunt Rigger 1998
