= Squad (film) =

2021 action thriller film by Nilesh Zaheeda Sahay

- Official release poster
- Directed by: Nilesh Sahay
- Written by: Nilesh Zaheeda Sahay; Shobha Nihalani
- Produced by: Nilesh Zaheeda Sahay; Brajesh Sahaya; Mohan Gopinath; Zee Studios
- Starring: Rinzing Denzongpa; Malvika Raaj; Pooja Batra
- Cinematography: Anshuman Singh Thakur
- Edited by: Debjan Bose; Nilesh Sahay
- Music by: Sonal Pradhan; Amjad Nadeem Aamir
- Production company: Indian Media Entertainment Network
- Distributed by: ZEE5
- Release date: 12 November 2021
- Running time: 124 minutes
- Country: India
- Language: Hindi

Squad is a 2021 Indian Hindi-language action thriller film written, directed and produced by Nilesh Sahay. It is also produced by Brajesh Sahaya, Mohan gopinath, and Zee Cinema. Shobha Nihalani co-wrote the screenplay along with Nilesh Sahay. Rinzing Denzongpa, Pooja Batra and Malvika Raaj in lead roles. The film premiered on ZEE5 on 12 November 2021.

Squad is the first Indian film to be shot in Belarus. Principal photography of the film commenced on 23 September 2019 at Belarusfilm studios in Minsk.

The film centers around an elite STF squad tasked with the responsibility of protecting the granddaughter of a scientist who possesses a blueprint of a lethal cyborg program.

== Plot ==
Squad centres about battle Royal to bring in a girl by Indian Elite squad.

== Cast ==
- Rinzing Denzongpa as Bhim Rana
- Malvika Raaj as Aria
- Naufal Azmir Khan as Veer
- Pooja Batra as Nandini Rajput
- Mohan Kapur as Abhay Bhatnagar
- Rohan Arora as Nakul
- Amit Gaur as Ajay
- Tanisha Dhillon as Addy
- Ashish Tyagi as Girish
- Abdullah Osman as Ayutam
- Dishita Jain as Mimi

== Production ==
It was announced in November 2018 that Rinzing Denzongpa, son of Danny Denzongpa, was to star in the film. While it was originally set to be directed by Jyoti Kapur Das, she later backed out, and Nilesh Sahay took over as Director. Malvika Raaj, was bought on board to play the female lead in February 2019. Malvika, famous for playing the younger "poo" in Kabhi Khushi Kabhie Gham (14 December 2001), is the niece of veteran actress Anita Raj, and grand daughter of legendary Jagdish Raj. In order get the best action possible, Producer Nilesh Sahay went out of his way to get legendary stunt co-ordinator Keir Beck, and Fight choreographer Maciej Kwiatkowski on board. Dishita Jain, Amit gaur, Tanisha Dhillon, Ashish Tyagi & Abdullah Osman were cast in the film, shortly before it went on floors in September.

=== Filming ===
Although filming was originally meant to commence in April 2019 Minsk, delays in preproduction & casting pushed it to September 2019. After the Muharat Shot on 23 September, filming went on for almost a month.

== Soundtrack ==
Squad

Soundtrack album by Sonal Pradhan and Amjad Nadeem Aamir
- Released: 3 November 2021
- Recorded: 2021
- Genre: Feature film soundtrack
- Length: 14:16
- Language: Hindi
- Label: Zee Music Company

Official audio
- Squad - Full Album on YouTube

The film's music was composed and lyrics were written by Sonal Pradhan and Amjad Nadeem Aamir.

Track listing
No.	Title	Lyrics	Music	Singer(s)	Length
1.	"Zindagi"	Sonal Pradhan	Sonal Pradhan	Samar Monsoon	2:55
2.	"Main Toh Tere Nashe Mein"	Amjad Nadeem	Amjad Nadeem Aamir	Sukriti Kakar	3:00
3.	"Baras Ja Tu"	Amjad Nadeem	Amjad Nadeem Aamir	Srishti Bhandari	4:45
4.	"Mitti"	Sonal Pradhan	Sonal Pradhan	Samar Monsoon	3:46
Total length:					14:16

== Reception ==
=== Critical response ===
Saibal Chatterjee from NDTV gave 1 star out of 5 and stated,"Squad is designed to showcase Rinzing Denzongpa, veteran actor Danny Denzongpa's son, and Malvika Raaj, Anita Raaj's niece. All that the film manages to do is leave the hopeful duo high and dry because it just doesn't get off the ground. It is a non-starter of a launchpad. Squad isn't all action. It has a couple of songs. One is picturized in a bar somewhere in Eastern Europe where the heroine shakes a leg to the beat of a desi song. The other is a romantic ditty that interrupts a sequence in which the hero and the heroine are in grave danger and decide to lose themselves in the labyrinths of love."

Shubham Dwivedi from Pinkvilla gave a 2/5 rating and said, "Malvika Raaj delivers a generic performance and it is difficult to shine in a film that is loaded with the ulterior motive of serving lousy mediocrity by writer and director Nilesh. Rinzing is monotone and bland like a potato. The screenplay is a fish out of the water and seizes to surprise. The mighty predictable and tacky action sequences are merely choreographed to fulfill the runtime. The characters don’t have another dimension but the erratically misleading sense of jingoistic patriotism."
