= Abhimaan (1973 film) =

1973 film by Hrishikesh Mukherjee

- Directed by: Hrishikesh Mukherjee
- Written by: Screenplay: Nabendu Ghosh; Dialogues: Rajendra Singh Bedi; Story & Screenplay Associates: Biresh Chatterjee; Mohini N. Sippy; Dialogue Direction: Biren Tripathy
- Story by: Hrishikesh Mukherjee
- Produced by: Susheela Kamat; Pawan Kumar Jain
- Starring: Amitabh Bachchan; Jaya Bachchan; Bindu; Asrani
- Cinematography: Jaywant Pathare
- Edited by: Das Dhaimade
- Music by: Sachin Dev Burman
- Production company: AmiYa Productions
- Release date: 27 July 1973
- Running time: 124 minutes
- Country: India
- Language: Hindi
- Box office: est. ₹ 1.7 crore (est. ₹ 43.52 crore as of 2019)

Abhimaan (lit. 'Pride') (Note: Initially the film was called Raag Ragini) is a 1973 Indian Hindi musical drama film directed by Hrishikesh Mukherjee, starring Amitabh Bachchan, Jaya Bachchan, Asrani, Bindu, and David. The film is perhaps best remembered for its songs, composed and arranged by S. D. Burman, written by Majrooh Sultanpuri and sung by playback singers Kishore Kumar, Lata Mangeshkar, Mohammed Rafi, Manhar.

According to Aalif Surti, the film is based on the troublesome marriage of two Hindustani classical music maestros, the sitarist Ravi Sankar and the surbahar player Annapurna Devi, though author Raju Bharatan states that Mukherjee based the film's story on the life of singer Kishore Kumar and his first wife, Ruma Guha Thakurta. The 1954 film A Star Is Born has also been cited as a vague influence. (Note: The 1937 version of the film is in the public domain and was based on the film What Price Hollywood? (1932), itself adapted from a story by Adela Rogers St. Johns, who loosely based her plot on the experiences of actress Colleen Moore and her husband, alcoholic producer John McCormick, and the life and death of director Tom Forman, who committed suicide following a nervous breakdown.) The 1970 Bengali film Bilambita Loy, starring Uttam Kumar and Supriya Devi is also noted to be an influence.

The film was a major hit at the box office and is amongst the earliest hits of Amitabh Bachchan's career. Jaya Bachchan won the Filmfare Best Actress Award for Abhimaan. Popular singer Anuradha Paudwal started her music journey from this film, where she sang a Sanskrit verse for Jaya Bhaduri.

== Synopsis ==
Subir is a professional singer with a soaring career. He has no plans to marry—until he meets Uma, a sweet village girl who is musically gifted. Subir falls in love with Uma and marries her and returns to Mumbai with his new bride. Subir continues as a singer and fosters Uma's singing career. His career falters, however, just as Uma's singing career begins to thrive.

Eventually, she becomes more successful than her husband, sparking jealousy from Subir. His pride and jealousy tears the marriage apart. The couple separates, and Uma has a miscarriage. After heavy criticism from his aunt, Subir realises the folly of his vanity and reconciles with Uma. In an emotional reunion they sing together.

== Cast ==
- Amitabh Bachchan as Subir Kumar
- Jaya Bachchan as Uma
- Bindu as Chitra
- Asrani as Chandar Kripalani
- David as Brajeshwarlal
- Durga Khote as Durga
- A. K. Hangal as Sadanand
- Lalita Kumari as Radha

== Production ==
The movie was made under the production AmiYa (Amitabh + Jaya), although the copyrights are owned by their secretaries.

Lata Mangeshkar was the sole voice of Jaya Bachchan in the movie, whereas Amitabh Bachchan was voiced by three singers.

Manhar Udhas recorded the demo for "Loote Koi Man Ka Nagar" and it was supposed to be sung by Mukesh; however Mukesh refused because he thought the demo sounded good and Udhas ought to be given a chance.

== Release ==
According to Saibal Chatterjee, Abhimaan was Bachchan's "biggest hit" in 1973 and "the most talked about film of the year".

The film was screened as inaugural film at 28th Kolkata International Film Festival on 15 December 2022, almost 50 years after its first screening.

== Soundtrack ==
All the songs were composed by S. D. Burman, winning him the Filmfare Award for Best Music Director. The lyrics were penned by Majrooh Sultanpuri.

The songs "Tere Mere Milan Ki Yeh Raina" and "Meet Na Mila Re Man Ka" were listed at the 16th and 23rd spots, respectively, on Binaca Geetmala's Annual List for 1973.

Abhimaan

Soundtrack album by S. D. Burman
- Released: July 27, 1973
- Genre: Feature film soundtrack
- Length: 39:00
- Language: Hindi
- Label: Saregama
- Producer: S. D. Burman

S. D. Burman chronology
Anuraag (1972)	Abhimaan (1973)	Jugnu (1973)

Songs
No.	Title	Singer(s)	Length
1.	"Tere Mere Milan Ki Yeh Raina (with Dialogues)" (Raga Khamaj)	Kishore Kumar & Lata Mangeshkar	4:59
2.	"Tere Mere Milan Ki Yeh Raina" (Raga Khamaj)	Kishore Kumar & Lata Mangeshkar	4:54
3.	"Meet Na Mila Re Man Ka"	Kishore Kumar	4:20
4.	"Teri Bindiya Re (with Dialogues)"	Amitabh Bachchan, Lata Mangeshkar & Mohammed Rafi	3:37
5.	"Piya Bina Piya Bina" (Raga Pahadi)	Lata Mangeshkar	4:11
6.	"Ab To Hai Tumse Har Khushi Apni" (Raga Maand, with Jhinjhoti)	Lata Mangeshkar	4:45
7.	"Teri Bindiya Re"	Lata Mangeshkar & Mohammed Rafi	4:32
8.	"Loote Koi Man Ka Nagar"	Lata Mangeshkar & Manhar Udhas	3:34
9.	"Nadiya Kinare" (Raga Pilu)	Lata Mangeshkar	4:05
Total length:			39:00

== Awards and nominations ==
Filmfare Awards
Year	Category	Nominee	Result	Ref.
1974	Best Actress	Jaya Bachchan	Won	
1974	Best Music Director	S. D. Burman	Won	
1974	Best Supporting Actor	Asrani	Nominated	
1974	Best Supporting Actress	Bindu	Nominated	

== Influence ==
The film was also a turning point for Bindu, who, for the first time, played a sympathetic character. Previously, she was known for playing vamps/cabaret dancers, such as in Amitabh's star-making hit Zanjeer (1973).
