= Professor (1962 film) =

- Directed by: Lekh Tandon
- Written by: Abrar Alvi
- Produced by: F. C. Mehra
- Starring: Shammi Kapoor; Kalpana Mohan; Lalita Pawar
- Cinematography: Dwarka Divecha
- Edited by: Pran Mehra
- Music by: Shankar Jaikishan
- Release date: 11 May 1962
- Running time: 167 minutes
- Country: India
- Language: Hindi

Professor is a 1962 Hindi musical comedy film produced by F. C. Mehra and directed by Lekh Tandon. The film stars Shammi Kapoor, Kalpana, Bela Bose, Lalita Pawar, Tun Tun and Iftekhar. It was a box office super hit.

The film was remade in Tamil as Nadigan (1990), in Telugu twice as Bhale Mastaru (1969), Peddinti Alludu (1991), and in Kannada as Gopi Krishna. Red Chillies Entertainment currently owns the film rights.

== Plot ==
Sita Devi Verma, established in Darjeeling is the guardian to two young women (Nina and Rita) and two school children (Bunty and Munnu) in her care. She is a strict guardian and the four often disobey her and create mischief behind her back. She is looking for a professor as a tutor, her only condition being that he should be above 50 years of age. Pritam Khanna, a young college graduate in dire need of work, applies for the job and get dejected after being rejected due to his age. The same day, he discovers his mother (Pratima Devi) has an advanced stage of tuberculosis and needs hospitalization. Due to financial difficulties, he disguises himself as an older professor and takes the job.

The women do not want a professor and try every trick in the book to defame the professor in the eyes of Sita Devi. Pritam soon catches on and defeats them at their own game. He falls in love with Nina and woos her as a young man in the city. Chaos ensues when Sita Devi develops feelings towards old Prof. Khanna and Pritam has to romance the two ladies in different disguises at the same time.

== Cast ==
- Shammi Kapoor as Professor Pritam Khanna
- Kalpana as Neena
- Randhir (actor) as Professor sahab
- Salim Khan as Ramesh Verma
- Lalita Pawar...Sita Devi Verma
- Parveen Choudhary...Rita Verma
- Pratima Devi as Pritam mom
- Rashid Khan...Hanuman Singh
- Bela Bose...Hanuman Singh's wife
- Tun Tun as Phool Rani
- Amol Sen as Dwarf driver Tun Tun Lover, boyfriend
- Iftekhar...Artist
- Bir Sakuja as Ramesh's father
- Moolchand as Jeweller
- Ratan Gaurang as Chang Hotel water
- Maqsood...Hotel waiter
- Ratnamala as Sita Devi's friend from tribal village
- Uma Khosla as Malti (Ramesh sister)
- Jugal Kishore as tailor master
- Gopal
- M.A. Latif as Doctor treating Rita Verma

== Soundtrack ==
All the songs were composed by Shankar–Jaikishan, assisted by Dattaram Wadkar.

#	Title	Singer(s)	Lyricist	Duration	Note	Raga
1	"Humrae Gaon Koi Ayega"	Lata Mangeshkar, Asha Bhosle	Hasrat Jaipuri	03:16	Picturised on Kalpana and Parveen Choudhary	
2	"Yeh Umar Hai"	Asha Bhosle, Usha Mangeshkar, Manna Dey	Hasrat Jaipuri	03:26	Picturised on Shammi Kapoor, Kalpana and Parveen Choudhary	
3	"Main Chali Main Chali"	Mohammad Rafi, Lata Mangeshkar	Shailendra	03:03	Picturised on Shammi Kapoor, Kalpana	
4	"Aye Gulbadan"	Mohammad Rafi	Hasrat Jaipuri	03:18	Picturised on Shammi Kapoor, Kalpana	
5	"Khuli Palak Mein Jhoota Gussa"	Mohammad Rafi	Shailendra	03:06	Picturised on Shammi Kapoor, Kalpana	
6	"Aawaz Deke Humein Tum Bulao"	Mohammad Rafi, Lata Mangeshkar	Hasrat Jaipuri	03:08	Picturised on Shammi Kapoor, Kalpana	Shivaranjani

== Awards and nominations ==
- Won: Filmfare Best Music Director Award - Shankar Jaikishan
- Nominated: Filmfare Award for Best Actor - Shammi Kapoor
- Nominated: Filmfare Award for Best Supporting Actress - Lalita Pawar
- Nominated: Filmfare Award for Best Lyricist - Hasrat Jaipuri for the song "Aai Gulbadan"
- Nominated: Filmfare Award for Best Male Playback Singer - Mohammed Rafi for the song "Aye Gulbadan"
