= Naughty Boy (film) =

- Poster
- Directed by: Shakti Samanta
- Produced by: Shakti Samanta
- Starring: Kishore Kumar; Kalpana Mohan
- Music by: S. D. Burman
- Release date: 1962
- Country: India
- Language: Hindi

Naughty Boy is a 1962 Indian romantic comedy film, starring Kishore Kumar and Kalpana Mohan. It was produced and directed by Shakti Samanta. The music was composed by S. D. Burman and he was assisted by his own son R. D. Burman. Dialogues were written by Vrajendra Gaur.

Due to the popularity of them as couple, Madhubala and Kishore Kumar were initially cast in the film. However, director Samanta replaced Madhubala with Mohan due to her illness and poor health condition.

== Plot ==
Pritam works as a Book-keeper in an Export Import Firm and does not have a roof to live under. When he goes to search for accommodation, he runs into a friend, Jagdish, who takes him to a rooming house and lets him share one room with himself, Kavi Viyogi, and Hhimsen. The landlady has very strict rules for all her tenants to wit: No one is allowed to romance on her property. On a rainy day when Pritam goes to buy milk, he runs into a beautiful girl, Meena Sharma, and their umbrellas get entangled, and when freed get interchanged. He goes to look for her house and finds she lives with her maternal uncle, a music maestro of sorts, and Pritam enrolls himself in his class. Pritam and Meena continue meeting and fall in love with each other. When Meena's sister is about to get married, she travels to Poona and that's when Pritam finds out that her train had an accident and she has been listed as one of the dead. Heart-broken and devastated he is severely depressed, until his co-workers decide that he should go for a picnic and this does cheer him considerably. In this cheerful state he returns home and decides to carry on with life without Meena. It is then Meena returns back, quite very much alive, and finds that Pritam is not in a state of mourning but is enjoying life to the fullest. She decides to teach him a lesson that he will never forget. Watch what happens when the lesson commences and what impact this has on our care-free friend - who is currently wooing a dancer by the name of Edna Wong.

== Cast ==
- Kishore Kumar as Pritam
- Kalpana as Meena Sharma / Edna Wong
- Bhattacharya
- Laxmi Chhaya as Bela
- Kamaldeep
- Tina Katkar
- Nand Kishore
- Krishnakant as Kavi Viyogi
- Kundan as Bhimsen
- Masood
- Uma Khosla as Veena (Meena friend)
- Moolchand as restaurant owner
- Pachhi as Punjabi speaker man in restaurant (He was brother of Om Prakash in real life)
- Praveen Paul as Landlady
- Om Prakash as Vaidraj Churandas "Jari-Bhuti" Chaturvedi
- Madan Puri as R.L. Mathur "Matur"
- Rafia
- Laxman Rao
- Kanu Roy as Doctor
- Shivraj as Mr. Sharma
- Sunder as Jagdish
- Edwina as Dancer1 (uncredited)
- Marie as Dancer2 (uncredited)
- Shinde as Dancer3 (uncredited)

== Soundtrack ==
For the first time, in this movie, Manna Dey sang for Kishore Kumar. Kishore Kumar, being extremely busy with acting at this point in his career, did not have time to record all his songs, hence other legendary Bollywood playback singers like Manna Dey, Mohammed Rafi and Mahendra Kapoor sang some songs filmed on him during this period.

Lyrics: Shailendra

=== Tracklist ===
No.	Title	Lyrics	Singer(s)	Length
1.	"Ab Toh Batla Are Zalim"	Shailendra	Kishore Kumar and Asha Bhosle
2.	"Haye Haye Woh Matwali Ada"	Shailendra	Kishore Kumar
3.	"Jahan Bhi Gaye Hum O Mere Humdam"	Shailendra	Kishore Kumar and Asha Bhosle
4.	"Nazren Milake Jo Duniya Ki"	Shailendra	Kishore Kumar
5.	"Rang Yeh Duniya Badalti Hai"	Shailendra	Kishore Kumar
6.	"Sa Sa Sa Sa Re"	Shailendra	Kishore Kumar and Asha Bhosle
7.	"Ho Gayi Shyam Dil Badnam"	Shailendra	Manna Dey and Asha Bhosle
8.	"Tum Mere Pehchane Phir Bhi"	Shailendra	Asha Bhosle
