= Kalpana Mohan =

Indian actress (1946–2012

- Born: Archana Mohan; 18 July 1946; Srinagar, Jammu and Kashmir, British India
- Died: 4 January 2012 (aged 65); Pune, Maharashtra
- Occupation: Actress
- Years active: 1962–1967
- Known for: Professor

Kalpana (born Archana Mohan; 18 July 1946 – 4 January 2012) was an Indian actress who worked in Hindi cinema in the 1960s. She featured alongside notable actors such as Shammi Kapoor in the film Professor (1962), Shashi Kapoor and Kishore Kumar in Pyar Kiye Jaa (1966), Dev Anand in Teen Devian, Pradeep Kumar in Saheli and Feroz Khan in Tasveer and Teesra Kaun.

The daughter of revolutionary Avani Mohan, Kalpana was also an accomplished Kathak dancer trained under the guidance of Pandit Shambhu Maharaj. She lived in Pune with her family. She lived for some time in Ambala Cantt. For some years she went to a school in Ambala Cantt. Her father was working in Khadi and village Industries Commission in the state office situated on Nicklson road in Ambala Cant during 1962–63.

== Early life ==
Kalpana Mohan, born as Archana Mohan in Srinagar on 18 July 1946, was of Panjabi and Dogra descent. Her father, Avani Mohan, was a freedom fighter and an active member of the All India Congress Committee. He was close to Pandit Jawaharlal Nehru and other prominent Congress stalwarts. Kalpana was trained in Kathak and was often invited by Pandit Nehru to perform at the Rashtrapati Bhavan whenever dignitaries visited.

== Career ==
Kalpana was discovered by actor Balraj Sahani and Urdu writer Ismat Chughtai, who encouraged her to come to Mumbai. Kalpana's debut film, Pyaar Ki Jeet, lasted a week in theatres. Her second film, Naughty Boy (1962) followed by her third film, Professor, released in 1962 which was a rare entertainer, and left the viewers delighted and satisfied. The film starred Shammi Kapoor, who earned a Filmfare nomination as Best Actor. In 1965, Kalpana starred in another successful film, Teen Devian, alongside Dev Anand. Her next film, the comedy Pyar Kiye Jaa came out in 1966. That same year, She also starred in Biwi aur Makan opposite Biswajit. Kalpana had a brief but successful career in Bollywood in the 60's and 70's but retired after she got married. Some of her last films were Saheli (1965), Picnic (1966), Tasveer (1966) and Nawab Siraj ud Daula in 1967.

== Filmography ==
Year	Film	Notes
1962	Pyaar Ki Jeet	Debut Film
1962	Naughty Boy	
1962	Professor	
1965	Saheli	
1965	Teen Devian	
1965	Teesra Kaun	
1966	Pyar Kiye Jaa	
1966	Picnic	
1966	Tasveer	
1966	Biwi Aur Makan	
1967	Nawab Siraj ud Daula	
1972	Ek Bechara	

== Personal life ==
Kalpana was married twice. In the mid-1960s, she married screenwriter and film director Sachin Bhowmick, but their marriage ended in a quick divorce. In 1967, she married an Indian Navy officer, with whom she had her only daughter. However, this marriage also ended in divorce in 1972.

Despite raising her daughter as a single parent, she ensured that her daughter received the best possible education. She continued to live in Mumbai for a while but stopped acting to focus on raising her daughter. She moved to Kalyani Nagar in the eastern region of Pune in the early 1990s and spent her remaining life there following medical advice to live in a cleaner climate for her health.

Kalpana's daughter later married and moved to the United States with her husband. Kalpana lived by herself in Pune where her health gradually began to deteriorate.

== Death ==
In 2011, Kalpana filed a complaint at the Khadak police station in Pune claiming that three individuals had allegedly made a fake memorandum of understanding by forging her signature. She alleged that they used this forged document to sell her 56.18-hectare (138.8-acre) plot of land in Mauje Visagar village to Sahara City builders in 2007. The stress caused by this legal matter took a toll on her health, further weakening her condition even more.

As her health declined, particularly due to cancer and a bout of pneumonia, her daughter and son-in-law travelled from the US to care for her. Kalpana died at the age of 65 in the early hours of 4 January 2012 at the Pune Hospital and Research Centre. Her death was attributed to complications from cancer.

She is survived by her daughter, Preeti Mansukhani, son-in-law, Harish; and grandchildren, Yash and Khushi. Kalpana's final rites were performed at the Vaikunth crematorium attended by her family and close friends. The news of her death was kept private for several days, as her family was concerned about the attention her property might attract.
