= Pooja Batra =

Indian-American model and actress (born 1975)

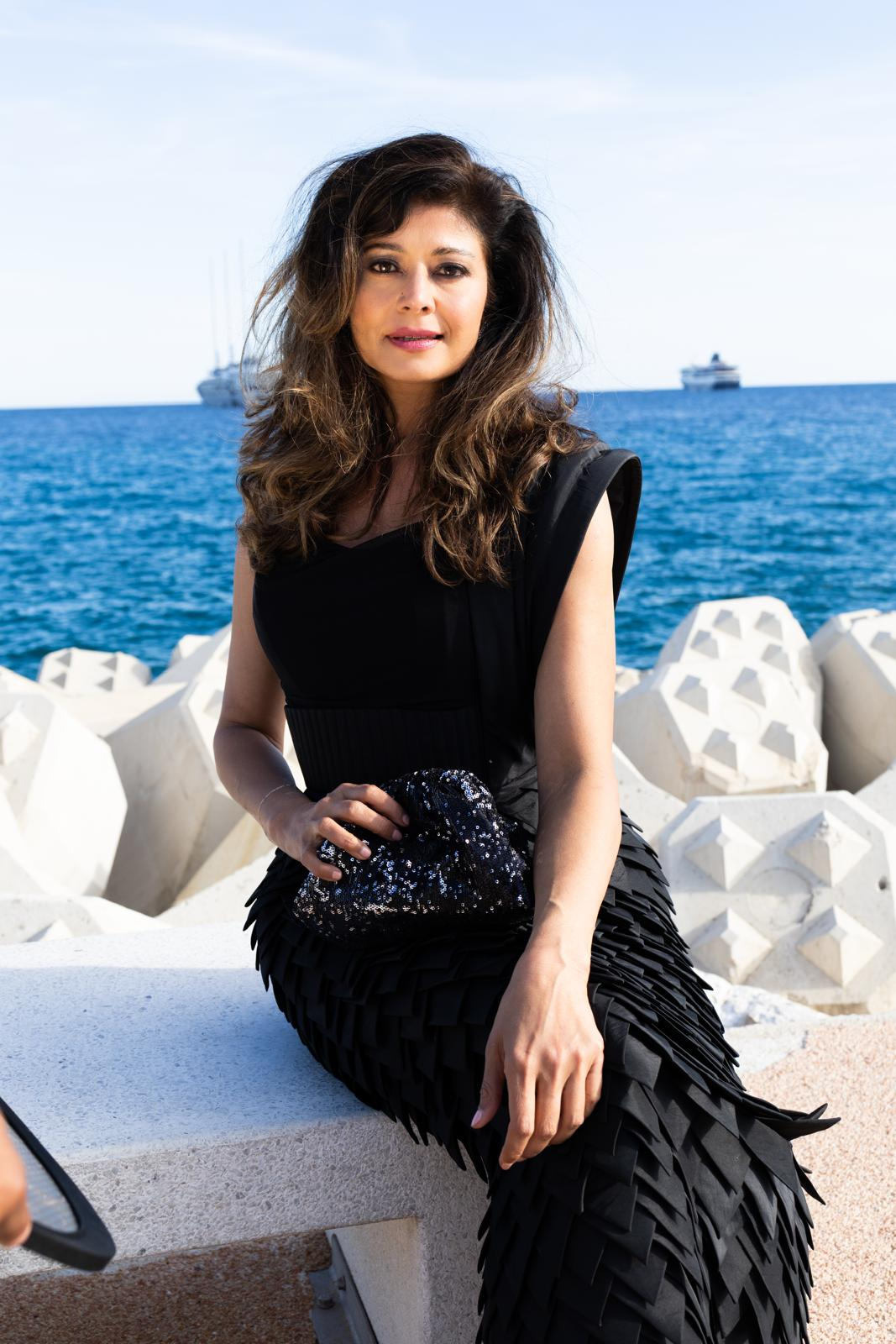
- Pooja Batra at the Cannes Film Festival (2026)
- Born: 27 October 1975 (age 51); Faizabad, Uttar Pradesh, India
- Citizenship: United States
- Occupations: Actress; model
- Spouses: Sonu S. Ahluwalia (m. 2003; div. 2011); Nawab Shah (m. 2019)
- Beauty pageant titleholder
- Title: Femina Miss India International 1993
- Years active: 1993-present
- Major competitions: Femina Miss India (Miss India 3) (Miss India International); Miss International 1993 (Semi-finalist)

Pooja Batra Shah (born 27 October 1975) is an Indian-American actress, model and beauty pageant titleholder. She primarily works in Hindi films. She was the runner-up at the Femina Miss India contest in 1993 and was crowned Femina Miss India International 1993, going on to represent India at Miss International 1993.

== Early life and background ==
Batra was born on 27 October 1975 to Ravi Batra, a colonel in the Indian Army, and Neelam Batra, a Miss India (1971) contestant. She has two brothers. She is related to Second Lieutenant Arun Khetarpal, a martyr decorated with India's highest military honour, the Param Vir Chakra.

Batra lived in Ludhiana with her extended family while she was young. While in school, she was an athlete and competed in the 200 and 400-meter dash. She graduated in Economics from Fergusson College, Pune and holds an MBA in marketing from Symbiosis, Pune. She participated at the Miss International beauty pageant in 1993.

== Career ==
At a young age, she started modelling as a part-time job. She was best known for her Liril soap commercial. She was the first Indian face to launch and be a spokesperson for Head & Shoulders in India. She has participated in over 250 modelling events and ad campaigns. She shot to fame when she was crowned Miss India International in 1993. She went on to become one of the top models in India. She walked the ramp for over 250 fashion shows in India and overseas. She is an ambassador for Parag Sarees.

Batra turned down many offers to complete her education before signing a contract with the Virasat Film Studio. The first film she signed was Virasat in 1997 followed by another film Bhai. She went on to work in over 20 films including Haseena Maan Jayegi, Dil Ne Phir Yaad Kiya and Kahin Pyaar Na Ho Jaaye. One of her films, Taj Mahal: An Eternal Love Story, a historical epic, was shown at the Cannes Film Festival in 2004. She is a life member of International Film And Television Club of the Asian Academy of Film & Television, Noida.

Batra has also appeared in South Indian films, including three Malayalam films and two Tamil films, including a cameo in the 1995 film Aasai.

In 2021, she appeared as Nandini Rajput in Squad.

== Personal life ==
Batra married orthopaedic surgeon Sonu S. Ahluwalia on 9 February 2003 in New Delhi and moved to Los Angeles, California. In January 2011, she filed for divorce in a US court, citing irreconcilable differences.

Batra revealed her relationship with actor Nawab Shah in June 2019. They got married on 4 July 2019 in Delhi according to Arya Samaj traditions.

== Philanthropy ==
Batra has volunteered time and money to charitable causes including AIDS (Mukti Foundation), homeless children, the Bombay Police Department and injured soldiers in the Kashmir war.

She did pro bono work in the film My Little Devil (Bas Yari Rakho), subtitled in Hindi, English, and French, to raise funds for the poor children in India. The film was co-produced by NFDC-La Fete (Canada) and directed by Gopi Desai. It was screened at the 24th Annual Montreal World Film Festival, 2000; Chicago International Children's Film Festival, 2000; 10th Annual Philadelphia Film Festival of World Cinema, 2001; and the Indian Films Festival in Malaysia, 2005.

== Filmography ==
Year	Film	Role	Language
1995	Aasai	Guest appearance	Tamil
1995	Sisindri	Herself	Telugu
1997	Vishwavidhaata	Poonam	Hindi
1997	Virasat	Anita	Hindi
1997	Bhai	Pooja	Hindi
1997	Chandralekha	Lekha	Malayalam
1998	Sham Ghansham	Roopa	Hindi
1998	Saazish	Rachel	Hindi
1998	Greeku Veerudu	Sirisha	Telugu
1999	Megham	Swati	Malayalam
1999	Oruvan	Kalpana	Tamil
1999	Haseena Maan Jaayegi	Pooja Verma	Hindi
2000	Bas Yaari Rakho	Pratibha	Hindi
2000	Daivathinte Makan	Sonia	Malayalam
2000	Kandukondain Kandukondain	Nandhini Varma	Tamil
2000	Kahin Pyaar Na Ho Jaaye	Mona	Hindi
2001	Ittefaq	Roshni Hiranandani	Hindi
2001	Dil Ne Phir Yaad Kiya	Sonia Chopra	Hindi
2001	Farz	Seductress	Hindi
2001	Kuch Khatti Kuch Meethi	Savitri	Hindi
2001	Jodi No.1	Casino dancer	Hindi
2001	Nayak: The Real Hero	Reporter Laila	Hindi
2003	Talaash: The Hunt Begins	Kamini Arora	Hindi
2003	Parwana	Parwana's associate	Hindi
2005	Taj Mahal: An Eternal Love Story	Noor Jahan	Hindi
2011	Hum Tum Shabana	Puja	Hindi
2015	ABCD 2	Pooja Kohli	Hindi
2016	Killer Punjabi	Rita Walia	Punjabi
2017	One Under the Sun	Kathryn Voss	English
2017	Mirror Game	Shonali	Hindi
2018	Timeless	Ananya Sirivastava	English
2018	The Rookie	Doctor	English
2020	Draupadi Unleashed	Mohini	English
2021	Squad	Nandini Rajput	Hindi
2027	Volshebnaya Lamba		Russian

== Awards and nominations ==
Year (Note: Refers to the year in which the ceremony was held.)	Award	Category	Film	Result	Ref.
1998	Filmfare Awards	Best Supporting Actress	Virasat	Nominated	
1998	Filmfare Awards	Best Female Debut	Virasat	Nominated	
1998	Screen Awards	Best Supporting Actress	Virasat	Nominated	
1998	Screen Awards	Most Promising Newcomer – Female	Virasat	Nominated	
1998	Zee Cine Awards	Best Actor in a Supporting Role – Female	Virasat	Nominated	
1998	Zee Cine Awards	Best Female Debut	Virasat	Nominated	
