= Jugnu (1973 film) =

- Film poster
- Directed by: Pramod Chakravorty
- Written by: Sachin Bhowmick; Gulshan Nanda; Ehsan Rizvi
- Produced by: Pramod Chakravorty
- Starring: Dharmendra; Hema Malini; Mehmood; Pran; Prem Chopra; Nazir Hussain; Ajit
- Cinematography: V. K. Murthy
- Edited by: R. M. Tipnis
- Music by: Sachin Dev Burman
- Production company: Pramod Films
- Distributed by: Gala Entertainment Corp.
- Release date: 1973
- Country: India
- Language: Hindi

Jugnu (transl. Firefly) is a 1973 Indian Hindi-language action heist film produced and directed by Pramod Chakravorty. It stars Dharmendra, Hema Malini, Mehmood, Lalita Pawar, Prem Chopra, Nazir Hussain, Ajit and Pran. The film features a popular dialogue written by Sachin Bhowmick, "Baap ke naam kaa sahara kamzor log lete hai", Meaning: "The weak seek to be known by their father's reputation", which was said on two occasions by Dharmendra and Pran. It went on to become one of the most loved and famous dialogues of all time in Hindi cinema.

== Synopsis ==
The story is about an extremely intelligent crook with a heart of gold, Ashok Roy alias Jugnu (Dharmendra), who has the remarkable ability to steal from the most protected setups.

== Cast ==
Actor	Character
Dharmendra	Ashok Roy "Jugnu"
Hema Malini	Seema
Mehmood	Mahesh
Pran	Shyam
Ajit	Boss
Prem Chopra	Ramesh
Lalita Pawar	Mrs. Ghanshyam Das
Jayshree T.	Sheela
Manmohan	Mike
Raj Mehra	Inspector General
Nazir Hussain	Shyam's Father
Kamal Kapoor	Police Inspector
Brahm Bhardwaj	Mr. Mazumdar
Dhumal	Sheela's Father

== Soundtrack ==
Jugnu

Soundtrack album by S. D. Burman
- Released: May 24, 1973
- Genre: Feature film soundtrack
- Length: 28:00
- Language: Hindi
- Label: Saregama
- Producer: S. D. Burman

S. D. Burman chronology
Abhimaan (1973)	Jugnu (1973)	Chhupa Rustam (1973)

The film's soundtrack was composed by S. D. Burman, with lyrics penned by Anand Bakshi.

- Gir Gaya Jhumka Girne Do was listed at #18 on Binaca Geetmala annual list 1973

Songs
No.	Title	Singer(s)	Length
1.	"Jane Kya Pilaya Tune"	Lata Mangeshkar	4:22
2.	"Gir Gaya Jhumka Girne Do"	Kishore Kumar & Lata Mangeshkar	4:20
3.	"Mere Payalia"	Lata Mangeshkar	5:25
4.	"Tera Peechha Na Chhodunga"	Kishore Kumar	4:53
5.	"Jugnu Chamke"	Lata Mangeshkar	4:48
6.	"Deep Diwali Ke Jhuthe"	Kishore Kumar & Sushma Shrestha	4:16
Total length:			28:00

== Reception ==
Upon release, Jugnu opened to packed houses and emerged a blockbuster in India as well as overseas. It was one of the seven successful films delivered by Dharmendra in 1973 and was the second highest-grossing Hindi film of the year, behind Raj Kapoor's Bobby.

Today, it remains a cult classic of Hindi cinema and represents one of Dharmendra's finest performances. The film was remade into Tamil and Telugu in 1980 as Guru, which had Kamal Haasan and Sridevi in the lead.
