= Ek Ke Baad Ek =

- Poster
- Directed by: Raja Rishi
- Written by: G.D. Madgulkar, Umesh Mathur (dialogues)
- Screenplay by: Dhruva Chatterjee
- Produced by: Raj Kala
- Starring: Dev Anand; Sharada; Tarla Mehta; Radhakrishan; Hiralal; S. K. Prem; Madhu Apte
- Cinematography: G. Kale
- Edited by: R. V. Shrikhanda
- Music by: S. D. Burman
- Production company: Raj Kala Productions
- Distributed by: Raj Kala Productions
- Release date: 1960
- Country: India
- Language: Hindi

Ek Ke Baad Ek (transl. One after the other) is a 1960 Indian Hindi-language film directed by Raja Rishi. The film stars Dev Anand, Sharada and Tarla Mehta.

== Plot ==
Mangal (S. K. Prem) lives with his wife Laxmi (Tarla), their six children and his younger brother Prakash (Dev Anand). Mangal has taken a loan from a local moneylender for Prakash's college education. Mangal's poverty is so bad that he sells his sixth child's bed to buy a blanket. Soon, Laxmi dies during delivery of the seventh child due to weakness of bearing so many children.. Meanwhile, Prakash becomes well-educated with a modern outlook and a reformist attitude, he confronts his brother every now and then with hard truths of life. Mangal calls Prakash an iconoclast and asks him to leave the house. This affects the lives of Prakash and his girlfriend Sandhya (Sharada). Her father Gangu Teli (Radhakrishan), a small time businessman, does not approve of their marriage. Prakash loses his cool when he finds his nephews and nieces begging for a living. He then immediately takes up a job in a printing press owned by Lalaji (Prabhu Dayal) who promotes family planning and other social issues. After obtaining the advance, Prakash arranges food and clothes for his kin, using Sandhya as the go-between. After Mangal loses his job he requests Gangu Teli to take him to the temple priest, Sanatan (Hiralal) with a request for advance, who while saying he is helpless appeals to the assembly to help him with whatever they can spare. Accepting the money was like begging, This invokes Mangal's conscience and he rushes back home. Sanatan and Gangu teli incites everyone that children are the gift of God and asks Prakash to leave the area propagating family planning but the people start thrashing him. Mangal cannot face his brother commits suicide by consuming poison. He convinces, Sanatan, Gangu teli and all the people that he is not against bearing children but limiting to two children to take care of them financially too. Finally Prakash and Sandhya get married and take responsibility of Mangal's children and not having their own.

== Cast ==
Adapted from The Hindu.

- Dev Anand as Prakash
- Sharada as Sandhya
- Tarla Mehta as Laxmi (Mangal's wife)
- Radhakrishan as Gangu Teli (Sandhya's Father)
- Hiralal as Sanatan (Temple priest)
- S. K. Prem as Mangal (Prakash's Brother)
- Prabhu Dayal as Lalaji (Printing press owner)
- Madhu Apte as Gangu's servant

== Soundtrack ==
Ek Ke Baad Ek

Soundtrack album by S. D. Burman
- Released: 1960
- Label: HMV
- Producer: S. D. Burman

The music was composed by S. D. Burman while Kaifi Azmi wrote the lyrics. On the album, film critic Suresh Kohli of The Hindu noted that except for "Chali Yeh Fauj Humari" and "Thumak Thumak Chali Hai", the other songs were "not really hummable".

All lyrics are written by Kaifi Azmi; all music is composed by S. D. Burman.

No.	Title	Singer(s)	Length
1.	"Aao Yaro Aao Pyaro Dekho"	Mohammed Rafi, Asha Bhosle	3:25
2.	"Chali Yeh Fauj Humari"	Mohammed Rafi	3:21
3.	"Haath Pasare Raste Raste"	Geeta Dutt, Sudha Malhotra	3:19
4.	"Na Tel Aur Na Bati"	Manna Dey	3:09
5.	"Pagli Hawa Jane Re"	Asha Bhosle	3:17
6.	"Thumak Thumak Chali Hai"	Mohammed Rafi	3:21
7.	"Batao Kya Karungi"	Mohammed Rafi, Geeta Dutt	3:17
8.	"Nazar milayi toh duniya se darna kya"	Mohammed Rafi, Asha Bhonsle	4:00

== Reception ==
Kohli wrote that the film "was a well-intended message-laden story with a weak, confused screenplay attempting to cash on Anand’s newly formed stardom." The film did not do well at the box office.
