= Killer Punjabi =

- Poster
- Directed by: Lakhvir Bansi
- Screenplay by: Ravinder Singh
- Story by: Ravinder Singh
- Produced by: Golden Coin Entertainment; Rav Production; Ravinder Singh; Pooja Batra
- Starring: Pooja Batra; Gulshan Grover; Kailey Rav; Jasbir Gill
- Cinematography: Bruce Borland; Chase Bowman; Dmitry Burenok; Sanjeev Chauhan; Peter Planta
- Edited by: Sun Gill
- Music by: Aslam Keyi
- Release date: 13 May 2016
- Country: India
- Language: Punjabi

Killer Punjabi is a Punjabi mystery-action-thriller featuring Pooja Batra alongside Gulshan Grover, Kailey Rav and Jasbir Gill. Filmed mostly in Los Angeles, it was directed by Lakhvir Bansi. This film is a debut Punjabi film of Pooja Batra.

== Plot ==
The film revolves around the life of a contract killer Rav, who never fails to kill his targets and faces a dilemma when he is instructed to kill the woman he loves.

== Music ==
Four songs appear in the film, composed by Aslam Keyi and Arvind Kumar.

== Cast ==
- Pooja Batra as Rita Walia
- Kailey Rav as Rav
- Gulshan Grover as Partap
- Jasbir Gill as Banta
- Shai Fali as Pam
- Paul Lazenby as Thug
- Nandini Minocha as Santosh
- Arsh Singh as Sukhi
