= Shikari (1946 film) =

- Directed by: Savak B. Vacha
- Written by: Saadat Hasan Manto
- Produced by: Filmistan Ltd.
- Starring: Ashok Kumar; Kishore Kumar; Veera; Paro; Rama Shukul; Leela Mishra; V. H. Desai
- Edited by: Dattaram Pai
- Music by: Anil Chandra Sengupta; Sachin Dev Burman
- Release date: 1946
- Country: India
- Language: Hindi

Shikari is a Bollywood film released in 1946, directed by Savak B. Vacha, starring Ashok Kumar, Kishore Kumar, Paro Devi and Veera. The music was directed by Anil Chandra Sengupta, with Sachin Dev Burman as the background singer.

== Cast ==
- Ashok Kumar
- Kishore Kumar
- Paro Devi
- Leela Mishra
- Rama Shukul
- S L Puri

== Soundtrack ==
All music composed by Anil Chandra Sengupta and Sachin Dev Burman and lyrics by Gopal Singh Nepali.

#	Title	Music director and composer	Singer(s)	Length
1	"O Rangeela Rangeela Rangeela"	Sachin Dev Burman	Kishore Kumar, Arun Kumar Mukherjee, Paro	3:12
2	"Duniya Ne Hamen Do Din"	Anil Chandra Sengupta, Sachin Dev Burman	Amirbai Karnataki, GS. Nepali	3:06
3	"Har Din Hai Naya"	Anil Chandra Sengupta, Sachin Dev Burman	Amirbai Karnataki, Ashok Kumar, GS. Nepali	3:16
4	"Dol Rahi Hai Naiya Meri"	Anil Chandra Sengupta, Sachin Dev Burman	Ashok Kumar, Pradeep	2:31
5	"Chupo Chupo O Marne Se Darne Walo"	S.D.Burman	Paro Devi, chorus	4:33
