= Guru (1980 film) =

1980 film by I. V. Sasi

- Poster of Tamil version
- Directed by: I. V. Sasi
- Written by: Haasan Brothers (dialogues)
- Based on: Jugnu
- Produced by: Prakash R. C.
- Starring: Kamal Haasan; Sridevi
- Cinematography: Jayanan Vincent
- Edited by: K. Narayanan
- Music by: Ilaiyaraaja
- Production company: Shiv Sakthi Films
- Release dates: 18 July 1980 (Tamil); 19 July 1980 (Telugu)
- Running time: 159 minutes
- Country: India
- Languages: Tamil; Telugu

Guru (transl. Teacher) is a 1980 Indian bilingual action heist film directed by I. V. Sasi. The film stars Kamal Haasan and Sridevi, while M. N. Nambiar, Muthuraman, and Mohan Babu play supporting roles. The story revolves around a philanthropist who masquerades as a vigilante.

Guru, a remake of the 1973 Hindi film Jugnu, was simultaneously made in Tamil and Telugu-languages. The Tamil version was released on 18 July 1980, and the Telugu version the day after. It was a blockbuster and completed a 365-day run at the box office.

== Plot ==
In pre-independent India, Raghu is a revolutionary who is disowned by his aristocratic father and is presumed dead while fleeing from the police. Ten years later, Raghu's wife is shot dead by a landlord attempting to rape her, and her young boy shoots the landlord in retaliation and absconds.

Several years later, the boy has grown up to be Ashok, a rich, reputed philanthropist who runs "Parvathi Nilayam," a shelter and institute for orphaned destitute children, named after his mother. Unknown to all except his close friend and associate Mahesh is the fact that to support "Parvathi Nilayam", Ashok also masquerades as "Guru", an elusive vigilante who performs several heists and is being hunted by the police. Meanwhile, Ashok's grandfather has been raising an impostor, Ramesh as his grandson, who has turned out to be felonious.

Ashok meets and falls in love with Sujatha, the niece of a top police official. Ashok strives to win her affection and succeeds. Ashok, in the guise of Guru, also tangles with a notorious mob headed by a one-armed man, one of whose associates is Ramesh. Ashok also has a chance encounter with his lost father, Raghu, who is now working as a professor, but Raghu conceals his identity to keep Ashok safe.

In a shocking twist, Ashok finds out that the landlord whom he had murdered as a boy was none other than Sujatha's father, and he starts rebuking Sujatha without revealing the truth to her, leaving her heart-broken. Distraught and despondent, Ashok plans one last big heist to support "Parvathi Nilayam" permanently, hand it over to his friend Mahesh, and seclude himself forever. Whether his plans succeed forms the rest of the story.

== Cast ==
Cast (Tamil)	Cast (Telugu)	Role
Kamal Haasan		Guru / Ashok
Sridevi		Sujatha
R. Muthuraman	Kaikala Satyanarayana	Raghu
M. N. Nambiar	M. Prabhakar Reddy	Head of the anti-social group
Major Sundarrajan	Kantha Rao	Commissioner of Police
Mohan Babu		Ramesh
Y. G. Mahendran		Mahesh
Poornam Viswanathan		Raghu's father
S. V. Ramadas		Sujatha's father
Ceylon Manohar		Henchman
Vennira Aadai Nirmala		Parvathi
Pandari Bai		Sujatha's mother
Jayamalini		Mahesh's love interest

== Production ==
Guru is a remake of the 1973 Hindi film Jugnu. For the song "Paranthalum Vidamatten" where Kamal Haasan travels in an aeroplane and Sridevi in a helicopter, the producer bought an aeroplane and a helicopter from Delhi. The song was shot over four days.

== Soundtrack ==
The music was composed by Ilaiyaraaja. Kannadasan, Gangai Amaran and Panchu Arunachalam provided lyrics for the Tamil version. For the Telugu version, all lyrics were written by Acharya Aatreya.

Tamil
No.	Title	Lyrics	Singer(s)	Length
1.	"Perai Chollava"	Kannadasan	S. P. Balasubrahmanyam, S. Janaki
2.	"Naan Vanangugiren"	Panchu Arunachalam	S. Janaki
3.	"Endhan Kannil"	Kannadasan	S. Janaki
4.	"Maamanukku Paramakudi"	Gangai Amaran	S. Janaki
5.	"Parandhalum Vidamatten"	Kannadasan	S. P. Balasubrahmanyam, S. Janaki
6.	"Aadungal Paadungal"	Kannadasan	S. P. Balasubrahmanyam

Telugu
No.	Title	Singer(s)	Length
1.	"Perucheppana"	S. P. Balasubrahmanyam, S. Janaki
2.	"Kannula Kipu"	S. Janaki
3.	"Nimmasettu Needunnadi"	S. Janaki
4.	"Naa Vandanamu"	S. Janaki
5.	"Nela Ina Ningi Ina"	S. P. Balasubrahmanyam, S. Janaki
6.	"Aadandi Paadandi"	S. P. Balasubrahmanyam

== Release and reception ==
Guru's Tamil version was released on 18 July 1980; the Telugu version was released the day after, on 19 July. Both versions were critically and commercially successful. The Tamil version was also successful in Sri Lanka, it ran there for two years becoming the second Tamil film after Vasantha Maligai for having successful run in Sri Lanka for two years. Kanthan of Kalki appreciated the performances of the cast, particularly Haasan, but felt the plot was an amalgam of various Hindi films.

== Legacy ==
The visuals for the songs "Paranthalum Vidamatten" and "Endhan Kannil" became iconic for the "technical marvel" in the former, and Sridevi's drunken comedy in the latter. In retrospect, Haasan has been critical of the film, calling it "crap".
