= Gambler (film) =

- Poster
- Directed by: Amarjeet
- Written by: Kaushal Bharti
- Produced by: Amarjeet Productions
- Starring: Dev Anand; Shatrughan Sinha; Zaheeda; Zaheera
- Cinematography: Faredoon A. Irani
- Edited by: Babu Sheikh
- Music by: Sachin Dev Burman
- Release date: 1971
- Running time: 154 minutes
- Country: India
- Language: Hindi

Gambler is a 1971 Indian Hindi-language crime thriller film directed by Amarjeet. The film stars Dev Anand, Zaheeda, Shatrughan Sinha.

== Plot ==
Raja (Dev Anand) has been abandoned by his biological mother at a very young age, and grows up with Master (Jeevan), a criminal don and card-sharp, who would like Raja to continue working with him on a commission basis. Raja learns all that could be learned about playing cards, quits work with Master, and starts work on his own. He succeeds considerably, and soon gets rich and wealthy. He falls in love with beautiful Chandra Gangaram (Zaheeda), and would like to marry her. But her father would like her to marry U.K. settled Ram Mehta (Sudhir), before Raja could do or say anything against this alliance, he is charged with the cold-blooded murder of Master. The climax in Raja's life is in the Court Room where he will find out about his past, and about his parents – while he awaits the outcome of the trial.

== Cast ==
- Dev Anand ... Raja
- Zaheeda ... Chandra Gangaram
- Shatrughan Sinha ... Banke Bihari
- Zaheera ... Julie (as Zahira)
- Sachin ... Georgie
- Iftekhar ... Police Commissioner
- Jagdish Raj ... Inspector Ranade
- Kishore Sahu ... Public Prosecutor
- Sudhir ... Ram Mehta
- Daya Kishan Sapru as Gangaram
- Jeevan ... Master
- Manorama ... Ram's aunt
- Tabassum ... Chandra's friend
- Mumtaz Begum ... Seeta Devi
- Rashid Khan ... as Georgie's father
- Ravikant
- Moolchand ... as godown owner
- Meena T ... as Mary
- Ratan Gaurang ... as jockey

== Soundtrack ==
The music for all the songs were composed by S. D. Burman and the lyrics were penned by Gopal Das Neeraj.

#	Title	Singer(s)	Duration
1	"Apne Honthon Ki Bansi"	Kishore Kumar, Lata Mangeshkar	03:54
2	"Choodi Nahin Ye Mera Dil"	Kishore Kumar, Lata Mangeshkar	04:27
3	"Dil Aaj Shayar Hai"	Kishore Kumar	03:33
4	"Mera Man Tera Pyasa"	Mohammed Rafi	04:14
5	"Kaisa Hai Mere Dil Tu Khiladi"	Kishore Kumar	03:23

- "Mera Man Tera Pyasa" was featured in the soundtrack of the 2004 film Eternal Sunshine of the Spotless Mind.
