= Phagun (1973 film) =

Hindi film written and directed by Rajinder Singh Bedi

- Poster
- Directed by: Rajinder Singh Bedi
- Written by: Rajinder Singh Bedi
- Produced by: Rajinder Singh Bedi
- Starring: Dharmendra; Waheeda Rehman; Jaya Bhaduri
- Music by: S. D. Burman
- Release date: 8 June 1973
- Running time: 136 minutes
- Country: India
- Language: Hindi

Phagun (transl. "Spring") is a 1973 Hindi film written and directed by Rajinder Singh Bedi, and starring Dharmendra, Waheeda Rehman, Jaya Bhaduri and Vijay Arora.

== Plot ==
The film has a Maharashtrian backdrop with many characters speaking Marathi dialogues and are in Marathi costumes. Shanta Damle, who belongs to rich Maharashtrian business family, falls in love and marries, a not so well off writer, Gopal, much to her family's dismay.

Later during the pivotal song, 'Piya sang khelo hori phagun aayo re', Gopal who has been away, surprises her by putting Holi colour over her, Shanta immediately rebukes him, for spoiling her silk saree, only to please her disapproving parents. But Gopal having been publicly humiliated leaves home, never to return. Phagun, the month in which festival Holi is celebrated, had changed forever for Shanta.

Shanta is now left to raise their daughter, Santosh 'Toshi' alone, who grows up to be a bright young woman. Santosh falls in love with Dr. Suman and marries him.

At some point, Shanta moves in with them for while, and soon her presence starts interfering in the marriage of the young couple, who try hard to adjust with her, but it only creates tension in their marriage. Shanta's loneliness, and her growing affection for her son-in-law, soon reminds her of the fact that how much does she miss male company, this only adds to her trouble and guilt.

In the end, she begs that she be reunited with her husband, after all these years, and Gopal returns, and they are reunited.

== Cast ==
- Dharmendra - Gopal
- Waheeda Rehman - Shanta Damle
- Jaya Bhaduri - Santosh 'Toshi'
- Vijay Arora - Dr. Suman
- Om Prakash - Dr. M.K. Effendi
- V. Gopal

== Soundtrack ==
Phagun

Soundtrack album by S. D. Burman
- Released: June 8, 1973
- Genre: Feature film soundtrack
- Length: 28:10
- Language: Hindi
- Label: Saregama
- Producer: S. D. Burman

S. D. Burman chronology
Chhupa Rustam (1973)	Phagun (1973)	Us Paar (1974)

All lyrics are written by Majrooh Sultanpuri; all music is composed by S. D. Burman.

Songs
No.	Title	Singer(s)	Length
1.	"Kab Mane O Dil Ke Mastane"	Kishore Kumar and Asha Bhosle	4:04
2.	"Piya Sang Khelo Holi"	Lata Mangeshkar	5:13
3.	"Mero To Girdhar Gopal"	Usha Mangeshkar	3:24
4.	"Bedardi Ban Gaye Koi"	Shobha Gurtu	6:38
5.	"Lali Mere Lal Ki Jeet"	Kishore Kumar, Pankaj Mitra, R. S. Bedi and Sunil Kumar	4:17
6.	"Sandhya Jo Aaye"	Lata Mangeshkar	3:37
Total length:			28:10
