= Gopaldas Neeraj =

Indian poet and author (1925–2018)

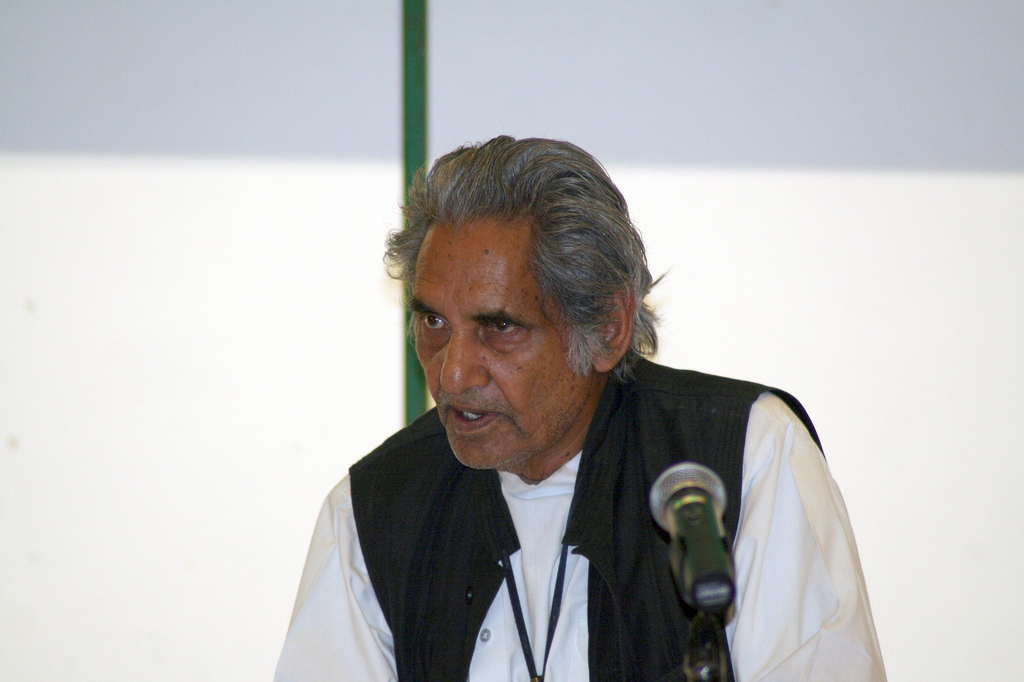
- Born: Gopaldas Saxena; 4 January 1925; Puravali, United Provinces, British India
- Died: 19 July 2018 (aged 93); Delhi, India
- Occupations: Poet, Songwriter
- Spouse: Savitri Devi (m. 1945–2001)
- Children: Milan Prabhat Gunjan
- Honours: Padma Shri (1991); Padma Bhushan (2007)

Gopaldas Saxena (known by his nom-de-plume, Neeraj; 4 January 1925 – 19 July 2018) was an Indian poet and author of Hindi literature. He was also a poet of Hindi Kavi sammelan (Poets Meet). He wrote under the pen name "Neeraj".

== Biography ==
Gopaldas Saxena was born on 4 January 1925 in the village of Puravali, near Mahewa in Etawah district of Uttar Pradesh, India. Besides writing, he earned his living teaching in a college and was a professor of Hindi Literature in Dharma Samaj College, Aligarh.

Several poems and songs written by Neeraj have been used in Hindi movies. He wrote songs for several Hindi films and was proficient in both Hindi and Urdu. In a television interview, Neeraj called himself an unlucky poet who had to concentrate on the poetry form instead of writing songs for films. His career as a film lyricist ended when he became depressed by the deaths of some of the film music directors with whom he had worked. He noted in particular the deaths of Jaikishan of the music duo Shankar–Jaikishan, and S. D. Burman, for both of whom he had written highly popular film songs.

He was awarded the Padma Shri in 1991 and Padma Bhushan in 2007.

His poems collection is named as Kavyanjali, which was published in 2014.

Neeraj died, aged 93, on 19 July 2018 in New Delhi. He had been admitted to hospital with a lung infection.

== Filmography ==
Some of the popular film songs written by Neeraj include:

Song	Film
Subah na aai sham na aai	Cha Cha Cha
Sapne jhare phool se	Nai Umar Ki Nai Fasal
Likhe jo khat tujhe	Kanyadaan
Kaal ka paahiya ghoome bhaiya	Chanda Aur Bijli
Ae bhai zara dekh ke chalo	Mera Naam Joker
Kehta hai joker sara zamana	Mera Naam Joker
Aap yahan aaye kis liye	Kal Aaj Aur Kal
Phoolon ke rang se	Prem Pujaari
Rangila re tere rang me	Prem Pujaari
Khilte hai gul yahan	Sharmilee
Megha chhaye aadhi raat	Sharmilee
Aaj madhosh hua jaaye re	Sharmilee
Kaise kahe hum	Sharmilee
Dil aaj shayar hai	Gambler
Mera man tera pyaasa	Gambler
Chudi nahin ye mera dil hai	Gambler
Re mann sur mein ga	Lal Paththar
Jeevan ki baagiyan	Tere Mere Sapne
Jaise Radha ne mala japi	Tere Mere Sapne
Ek maine kasam li, ek tune kasam li	Tere Mere Sapne
Jhoom ke ga yun aaj mere dil	Patanga
Tum kitni khubsoorat ho	Jangal Mein Mangal
Ek musafir hoon main, ek musafir hai tu	Gunaah (1993)
