= Nadigan =

- Poster
- Directed by: P. Vasu
- Screenplay by: P. Vasu
- Based on: Professor by Abrar Alvi
- Produced by: M. Ramanathan
- Starring: Sathyaraj; Khushbu
- Cinematography: Ashok Kumar
- Edited by: P. Mohan Raj
- Music by: Ilaiyaraaja
- Production company: Raj Films International
- Release date: 30 November 1990
- Country: India
- Language: Tamil

Nadigan (transl. Actor) is a 1990 Indian Tamil-language comedy thriller film written directed by P. Vasu. A remake of the Hindi film Professor (1962), it stars Sathyaraj and Khushbu. The film was released on 30 November 1990 and became a critical and commercial success, winning four Tamil Nadu State Film Awards.

== Plot ==
Vishwanathan, a ruthless businessman, murders his partner Raghu to avoid sharing massive profits. He stages the murder to look like suicide and plays the innocent at his daughter's wedding, feigning grief over Raghu's death. Unbeknownst to Vishwanathan, a videographer secretly records his conversation with a henchman, discussing the murder plan. The videographer escapes and hides the incriminating video cassette in Geetha's bag as she flees in her car. Tragically, the videographer is later killed in a theater by Vishwanathan's men, and his body disappears before Geetha can report the incident to the police. Vishwanathan's men are hot on the trail of Geetha, the one who unknowingly possesses the damning evidence. Geetha, Radha, Dippa, and Prashanth live with their spinster aunt, Anandha Karpagavalli, in a vast Island Estate in Kodaikanal. Karpagavalli is a strict, old-school caretaker who enforces traditional values and discipline, restricting the freedom of the teenage sisters and their younger siblings, who find her rules suffocating.

Raja, a street performer, is struggling to make ends meet. His mother needs a bypass graft surgery within 30 days, and Raja must find a way to earn the money. The doctor recommends a change of environment for his mother's treatment, so they head to Kodaikanal, and are also in search of a job. On their journey by train, Raja meets Devaraj, a music teacher travelling to the Island Estate for a job that pays ₹3,000 (equivalent to ₹29,000 or US$310 in 2023) per month. Devaraj carries a recommendation letter with a contact address, hoping to secure the position. When Raja and Devaraj exit the train, they accidentally swap suitcases. Raja finds Devaraj's job offer letter in his suitcase and, desperate to fund his mother's surgery, decides to take the job. He disguises himself as an old man, "Devaraj," by wearing a beard and white hair, and joins the Island Estate as a music teacher and caretaker.

Meanwhile, the real Devaraj is unable to find Raja or the Island Estate due to his poor English, as people don't understand what he means by "Is-land." As "Devaraj," Raja gains Karpagavalli's trust by praising her excessively, and she develops romantic feelings for him, thinking he's an unmarried elderly man. Meanwhile, Geetha and Radha try to outsmart "Devaraj" and enjoy freedom beyond their aunt's restrictions. They devise plans to get rid of him, but all their attempts fail. Once, Geetha is saved by Raja from Vishwanathan's henchmen. At this moment, Geetha believes him to be a different person from her music teacher, Devaraj, and develops feelings for Raja. Kurangu Kannayiram, a petty thief, hides in Raja's house while evading the police. Upon discovering Raja's true identity, Kannayiram blackmails him, forcing Raja to let him stay in his house. As Karpagavalli reforms, she relaxes her restrictions, allowing Geetha and Radha to dress as they like, she starts obeying "Devaraj's" words, and even accepts Radha's love for Inspector Chinni. She invites "Devaraj" to stay in their house, driven by her affection for him.

Also, Kannayiram, posing as Kandhasamy, Devaraj's fake brother, enters the household. Meanwhile, Vishwanathan sends two women to retrieve the incriminating cassette from Geetha's house secretly. Geetha convinces her aunt to consider Raja as a potential groom, which Karpagavalli accepts after meeting Raja. In return, she seeks Raja's help to arrange her union with "Devaraj", unaware that "Devaraj" is Raja in disguise. Raja is shocked by the proposal. When "Devaraj" removes his disguise, Geetha discovers his true identity as Raja and feels betrayed, leading to a breakup. Soon, Geetha's friend Maya sends the video cassette to Chinni, but Vishwanathan's henchwoman abducts Geetha at knifepoint, taking the cassette. Raja rescues Geetha, but Vishwanathan kidnaps her family, demanding the cassette. Raja, along with Kannayiram, saves the family, and Karpagavalli learns about Raja's dual identity. After a brief fight and a road chase, Raja saves the family, and Vishwanathan's men are arrested for their crimes.

In the end, the real Devaraj, whose suitcase was swapped with Raja's, finally finds the Island Estate and meets Karpagavalli to take up the music teacher position.

== Cast ==
- Sathyaraj as Raja
- Khushbu as Geetha
- Manorama as Anandha Karpagavalli
- Goundamani as Kurangu Kannayiram
- Vennira Aadai Moorthy as Devaraj
- Chinni Jayanth as Chinni
- Prathapachandran as Vishwanathan
- Ramu as Vishwanathan's henchman
- Pandu as Pandu
- Dinesh as Vishwanthan's henchman
- Oru Viral Krishna Rao as a constable
- Sethu Vinayagam as Inspector General of Police
- Kamala Kamesh as Raja's mother
- Balambika as Radha
- Master Prashanth Vasu as Prashanth
- Baby Natasha Ali as Dippa
- Mansoor Ali Khan as Vishwanthan's henchman (uncredited role)

== Production ==
Nadigan is a remake of the Hindi film Professor (1962). Although the story is set primarily in Ooty, the film was shot in Kodaikanal.

== Soundtrack ==
The soundtrack was composed by Ilaiyaraaja.

Track listing
| No. | Title | Lyrics | Singer(s) | Length |
|---|---|---|---|---|
| 1. | "Aattama Paattama" | Vaali | S. P. Balasubrahmanyam | 04:52 |
| 2. | "Deva Malligai" | Pulamaipithan | S. P. Balasubrahmanyam, S. Janaki | 04:45 |
| 3. | "Vela Vanthu" | Vaali | Malaysia Vasudevan | 04:47 |
| 4. | "Enge Nimmathi" | Ilaiyaraaja | S. P. Balasubrahmanyam | 04:51 |
| 5. | "Adi Veluthu" | Vaali | K. S. Chithra, S. P. Balasubrahmanyam | 05:04 |
| Total length: | | | | 29:24 |

== Release and reception ==
Nadigan was released on 30 November 1990. N. Krishnaswamy of The Indian Express praised Sathyaraj's acting and Ashok Kumar's cinematography. C. R. K. of Kalki praised the film's humour, music and cinematography. The film was a success, running for over 125 days in theatres. It won the Tamil Nadu State Film Awards for Best Dialogue Writer (Vasu), Special Award for Best Actor (Sathyaraj), Best Art Director (Salam) and Best Stunt Director (Vikram Dharma).
