= Biwi Aur Makan =

- Directed by: Hrishikesh Mukherjee
- Screenplay by: Hrishikesh Mukherjee; Sachin Bhowmick
- Dialogue by: Rajinder Singh Bedi
- Story by: Sailesh Dey
- Based on: Sailesh Dey's Bengali play Joymakali Boarding
- Produced by: Hemant Kumar
- Starring: Biswajit Chatterjee; Kalpana Mohan; Mehmood
- Cinematography: T. B. Seetharam
- Edited by: Das Dhaimade
- Music by: Hemant Kumar
- Production company: United Producers
- Release date: 1966
- Country: India
- Language: Hindi

Biwi Aur Makan (transl. Wife and home) is a 1966 Hindi film written and directed by Hrishikesh Mukherjee. It is a remake of Bengali film Joy Maa Kali Boarding (1955), which itself is an adaptation of Sailesh Dey's play of the same name. The film stars Biswajit, Kalpana Mohan, Kesto Mukherjee and Mehmood in lead roles with music composed by Hemant Kumar.

== Cast ==
- Biswajit Chatterjee as Arun
- Kalpana Mohan
- Mehmood as Pandey
- Shabnam as Leela
- Keshto Mukherjee as Kisan
- Badri Prasad
- Bipin Gupta
- Ashish Kumar as Shekhar
- Padma Khanna
- Brahm Bhardwaj

== Soundtrack ==
The music of the film was composed by Hemant Kumar and the lyrics were penned by Gulzar.

- "Khul Sim Sim Khullam Khulla" by Manna Dey, Hemant Kumar and Bhela Gupta
- "Jane Kahan Dekha Hai" by Mohammed Rafi
- "Aa Tha Jab Janam Liya Tha" by Manna Dey
- "Aise Danton Mein Ungli Dabao Nahin" by Asha Bhosle
- "Dabe Labon Se Kabhi Jo Koi Salam Le" by Asha Bhosle and Lata Mangeshkar
- "Sawan Mein Barkha Sataye" by Hemant Kumar
