= Angel (2011 film) =

- Theatrical release poster
- Directed by: Ganesh Acharya
- Story by: Mauzzam Beg
- Produced by: Ganesh Acharya
- Starring: Nilesh Sahay; Madalsa Sharma; Aruna Irani; Manoj Joshi
- Cinematography: Aseem Bajaj
- Edited by: Nilesh Naik
- Music by: Amjad Nadeem
- Release date: 4 February 2011
- Country: India
- Language: Hindi

Angel is a 2011 Indian Hindi-language action drama film directed by Ganesh Acharya and starring Nilesh Sahay, Madalsa Sharma, Aruna Irani and Manoj Joshi. The film was produced by Ganesh Acharya, while the soundtrack was composed by Amjad Nadeem. This movie is about the struggle for acceptance. The main character, Abhay Chawla, got into an accident, which made Sonal mad. Abhay felt guilty, so he started taking care of her and eventually befriended her They fall in love eventually. This movie is about the struggles they have to face in love.

== Cast ==
- Nilesh Sahay as Abhay Chawla (Hero)
- Madalsa Sharma as Sonal Mahajan
- Aruna Irani as Aarti Chawla, Abhay's mother
- Manoj Joshi as Rohan Chawla
- Vaishali Thakkar as Priya Chawla
- Syed Abdul Azeem as Rahul G. Pandey

== Plot ==
Abhay is a careless, high-on-life boy who lives with his mother, brother, and sister-in-law. One day while riding his motorcycle, he crashes into an old man who dies on the spot, and Abhay is sentenced to two years in jail. When he is released from prison, he goes to his home only to find out that his brother sold the house and shifted somewhere else. He goes to a restaurant, and after he is finished with his meal, he realises that he has no money and gives his brother's number to the owner, but that number is unavailable, and the owner hands him over to the police. His brother finally shows up after a few hours and takes him to their new home. Abhay slowly realises that everyone is angry with him and they are more than happy without him. Even his friends do not want to reunite with him, as he had been jailed for two years. The next day he goes to the residence of the man he killed. There he meets his daughter, Sonal, who is both physically and mentally challenged due to trauma five years before. He tries to befriend her and leaves his number on the dressing mirror. Sonal's brother and sister-in-law got a flat as compensation for her disease but left her to their own house in a chawl. They have left her along with a maid called Marry. Abhay joins his brother's garage and starts helping a fellow mechanic named Vihsal. And he also develops a feeling of affection for Sonal. He takes her to a charitable hospital and finds out about her disease, and she can recover from it only by doing exercises and getting emotional support and motivation. Abhay tries his best to help her recover and falls for her. On Sonal's birthday eve, he confesses his love, and they both start making, which is witnessed by Sonal's family, and they accuse him of raping their physically challenged sister. Abhay is sentenced to 7 years' imprisonment. Now the only way to get Abhay out of jail is for Sonal to tell the police the truth.

== Soundtrack ==
The album features 7 tracks composed by Amjad Nadeem. Lyrics were written by Shabbir Ahmed.

=== Track listings ===
#	Song	Singer(s)	Length
1	"Phir Teri"	Sonu Nigam	5:00
2	"Rubaru" (Kyun Faaslein Hai)	Amjad Nadeem & Shweta Pandit	5:14
3	"Aye Khuda" (Duet)	Sonu Nigam & Sukhwinder Singh	6:02
4	"Angel"	Karthik & Shweta Pandit	6:05
5	"Tell Me Why"	Neeraj Shridhar	5:11
6	"Titliyon Ki Phoor"	Shweta Pandit	4:41
7	"Aye Khuda"	Sukhwinder Singh	5:58
