= Bhale Mastaru =

- Theatrical release poster
- Directed by: S. D. Lal
- Written by: Bhamidipati Radhakrishna (dialogues)
- Based on: Professor (1962)
- Produced by: C. S. Raju
- Starring: N. T. Rama Rao; Anjali Devi; Kanchana
- Cinematography: K. S. Prasad
- Edited by: B. Gopal Rao
- Music by: T. V. Raju
- Production company: Vijayagiri Dhwaja Productions
- Release date: 27 March 1969
- Running time: 173 mins
- Country: India
- Language: Telugu

Bhale Mastaru (transl. Great Teacher) is a 1969 Indian Telugu-language comedy film, produced by C. S. Raju under the Vijayagiri Dhwaja Productions banner and directed by S. D. Lal. It stars N. T. Rama Rao, Anjali Devi and Kanchana, with music composed by T. V. Raju. The film is remake of the Hindi movie Professor (1962).

== Cast ==
- N. T. Rama Rao as Madhu / Prof Sonty
- Anjali Devi as Seeta Devi
- Kanchana as Vijaya
- Krishnam Raju as Giri
- Raja Babu as Buchi Babu
- Allu Ramalingaiah as Joogulu
- Prabhakar Reddy
- Mikkilineni
- Dr. Sivaramakrishnaiah
- Santha Kumari as Madhu's mother
- Rama Prabha as Kasulu
- Sheela as Vimala

== Soundtrack ==
Bhale Mastaru

Film score by T. V. Raju
- Released: 1969
- Genre: Soundtrack
- Length: 24:49
- Label: EMI Columbia
- Producer: T. V. Raju

Music was composed by T. V. Raju.

S. No.	Song title	Lyrics	Singers	length
1	"Naalo Yemayano"	C. Narayana Reddy	P. Susheela, L. R. Eswari	3:41
2	"Ringu Masteru"	Kosaraju	Ghantasala, L. R. Eswari	3:41
3	"Adhigo Chinnadhi"	Dasaradhi	A.L.Raghavan	2:50
4	"Hello Madam"	Dasaradhi	Ghantasala	3:10
5	"Vundani Vundani"	C. Narayana Reddy	P. Susheela	4:26
6	"Neeve Nanai"	Aarudhra	Ghantasala, P. Susheela	3:23
7	"Ye Daari Godari"	Kosaraju	Pithapuram, L. R. Eswari	3:38
8	"1 2 3 Twist dance le"	Kosaraju	L. R. Eswari	4:01
