= Nabadwipchandra Dev Burman =

Indian sitarist and singer (1854–1931)

Mahamanyabar Rajkumar Srila-Srijukta Nabadwipchandra Dev Burman (1854 – 5 September 1931), also transliterated as Nabadwip Chandra Deb Barman, was a noted Indian sitarist and Dhrupad singer. He was the father of composer S. D. Burman and grandfather of another composer R. D. Burman.

== Early life ==
N. D. Burman was born at the Royal palace of Tripura situated in the Indian state of Tripura. He was the second son of Ishan Chandra Manikya (Ishanachandra Dev Burman), Raja of Tripura (r. 1849–1862). His mother was Queen Keisham Chanu Jatiswari. He and his elder brother were at their father's death in 1862 excluded from the throne of Tripura by their paternal uncle Bir Chandra Manikya, but from 1923 to 1927 he was President of the Regency Council of Tripura for his kinsman Bir Bikram Kishore Debbarman, Maharaja of Tripura (r. 1923–1947). He was granted the personal title of Mahamanyabar on 31 January 1928.

The autobiography of Nabadwipchandra is known as Abarjanar Jhuri.

N.D. Burman was married to Nirupama Devi, by whom he had nine children including the famed singer and Indian film music composer Sachin Dev Burman (the youngest of five sons).
