= Meera Dev Burman =

Indian lyricist and musician (1912–2007)

- Born: Meera Dasgupta; 1 March 1912; Bengal Presidency, British India
- Died: 15 October 2007 (aged 95) Bombay (now Mumbai), Maharashtra, India
- Occupations: Lyricist; Musician; Composer
- Spouse: S. D. Burman

Ami Takdum tadum bajai (I play the rhythm "takdum takdum")
Lyricist Meera Dev Burman, composer and singer S. D. Burman

Meera Dev Burman (née Dasgupta; 1912–2007) was an Indian Bengali lyricist and musician. She was the wife of music director Sachin Dev Burman and mother of Rahul Dev Burman. She wrote lyrics for several Bengali films and helped her husband as an assistant in Hindi films.
