= Prem Pujari =

1970 film by Dev Anand

- Prem Pujari poster
- Directed by: Dev Anand
- Written by: Dev Anand
- Produced by: Dev Anand
- Starring: Dev Anand; Waheeda Rahman; Shatrughan Sinha; Zaheeda; Madan Puri
- Cinematography: Fali Mistry
- Edited by: Babu Shaikh
- Music by: S. D. Burman; Neeraj (lyrics)
- Release date: 28 January 1970
- Running time: 192 Minutes
- Country: India
- Language: Hindi

Prem Pujari (lit. 'Love Devotee') is a 1970 Indian Hindi-language romantic drama film produced, directed and written by Dev Anand for Navketan Films, his directorial debut. It stars Anand, Waheeda Rehman, Shatrughan Sinha, Prem Chopra, Madan Puri and a then-unknown Amrish Puri. It has several popular songs composed and directed by S. D. Burman. The songs were written by Gopaldas Neeraj. The film was a commercial failure, however the soundtrack album is regarded as a masterpiece among classical Hindi film music aficionados, particularly the songs "Shokhiyon Mein Ghola Jaye" sung by Kishore Kumar and Lata Mangeshkar, "Phoolon Ke Rang Se" sung by Kumar and "Rangeela Re Tere Rang Mein" sung by Mangeshkar.

== Plot ==
Lieutenant Ramdev Bakshi is the son of widowed army officer Durgadas Bakshi. Ram is an innocent man who has a deep interest in wildlife. Ram is in the army as per his father's choice. He loves Suman, a beautiful, cheerful lady living in Ram's village in Khemkaran. Ram and Suman spend their time together romancing.

One day, a letter comes from the Indian Army stating that Ram should return to the Indo-Chinese border since his holidays are over. Ram engages in a debate with his father where he wishes to leave the army. But he ultimately bids farewell to his village and Suman. On reaching the border, he refuses to take part in the war since he believes in the non-violence or ahimsa. Frustrated, the army sentences him to two years in Civil Jail for not abiding to the orders of his seniors. Fortunately, Ram runs away from the police and is roaming in the mountains of the northeast.

Later, he turns himself in and seeks forgiveness for his refusal to listen to orders by spying for India. He is sent to Beijing from where he passes on many important Chinese secrets to India, helping them win the war. Later, Pandit Nehru awards him with the country's highest military honor. After the war, he marries Suman and the two live happily together.

== Cast ==
- Dev Anand as Lt. Ramdev Bakshi / Peter Andrews / Yoo Thok
- Waheeda Rehman as Suman Mehra
- Shatrughan Sinha as Pakistan Army Officer
- Zaheeda as Rani Chang / Mrs. Andrews / Mrs. Seema Yoo Thok
- Prem Chopra as Bilkis Mohammed (Billy)
- Anup Kumar (actor) as Kulbhushan
- Nazir Hussain as Retd. Subedar Major Durgaprasad Bakshi
- Madan Puri as Chang
- Manmohan as Chinese Army Officer
- Sajjan as Suman's maternal uncle
- Amrish Puri as Henchman in church of Spain
- Sachin as Sunder
- Siddhu as Chamanlal

== Filming ==
The film was shot in Switzerland and has Grimsel Hotel in one of the song sequences. Here, Shatrughan Sinha was picked to play his part from the gathered public. Part of Prem Pujari was also shot at Astagaon near Shirdi in Ahmednagar district of Maharashtra.

== Music ==
The music was composed by S. D. Burman, with lyrics by Neeraj. Several of the songs from the film became popular, "Phoolon Ke Rang Se" sung by Kishore Kumar (music of which was reused by Burman from his earlier Bengali song "Borne Gondhe Chonde Geetitey"), "Rangila Re Tere Rang Mein" which was a blend of folk and modern and sung by Lata Mangeshkar, "Shokhiyon Mein Ghola Jaaye" by Mangeshkar and Kishore Kumar, "Taaqat Watan Ki Hum Se Hai" (patriotic song), and the number in Burman's voice "Prem Ke Pujari Hum Hain". According to Anantharaman, Dev Anand stated that "Rangila Re" remained his all-time Navketan favourite song.

| S.No | Title | Singer(s) | Duration | Raga |
|---|---|---|---|---|
| 1 | "Prem Ke Pujari Hum Hai" | Sachin Dev Burman | 04:18 | |
| 2 | "Shokhiyon Mein Ghola Jaye" | Kishore Kumar, Lata Mangeshkar | 05:05 | |
| 3 | "Phoolon Ke Rang Se" | Kishore Kumar | 04:57 | Pahadi |
| 4 | "Phoolon Ke Rang Se (Revival)" | Kishore Kumar | 04:55 | Pahadi |
| 5 | "Shokhiyon Mein Ghola Jaye (Revival)" | Kishore Kumar, Lata Mangeshkar | 05:11 | |
| 6 | "Yaaron Neelam Karo Susti" | Kishore Kumar, Bhupinder Singh | 04:18 | |
| 7 | "Taqat Watan Ki Humse Hai" | Mohammed Rafi, Manna Dey | 07:23 | |
| 8 | "Dungi Tenu Reshmi Rumal" | Lata Mangeshkar | 04:03 | |
| 9 | "Rangeela Re Tere Rang Mein" | Lata Mangeshkar | 06:15 | |

== Reception ==
While Prem Pujari did not do well at the box office, Sachin dev Burman's soundtrack became a success and was termed as "superlative" and as a "brilliant score". The songs are known for the purity of their Urdu and Hindi languages and are regarded as evergreen classics.
