= S. D. Burman =

Indian singer and composer (1906–1975)

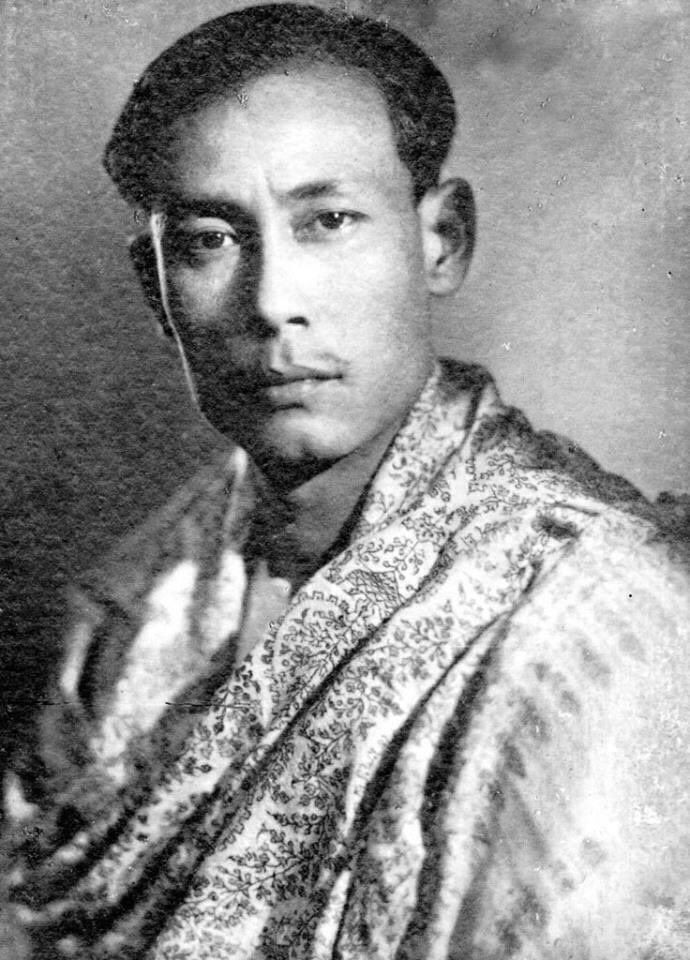

Background information
- Born: Sachin Dev Burman; 1 October 1906; Comilla, Eastern Bengal and Assam, British India, (present-day Comilla District, Bangladesh)
- Died: 31 October 1975 (aged 69) Bombay, Maharashtra, India (present-day Mumbai)
- Genres: Indian classical; Bengali folk music; Folk; Indian music; Filmi
- Occupations: Music director; Folk artist; Singer; Composer; Musician
- Instruments: Vocals; sarod; tabla; sarangi; sitar
- Years active: 1932 – 1975
- Spouse: Meera Dasgupta (m. 1938)

Ami Takdum tadum bajai (I play the rhythm "takdum takdum")
Lyricist Meera Dev Burman, composer and singer S. D. Burman

Sachin Dev Burman (1 October 1906 – 31 October 1975) was an Indian music director and singer. He was a member of the Tripura royal family. He started his career with Bengali films in 1937. He later began composing for Hindi movies and became one of the most successful and influential Indian film music composers. Burman composed the soundtracks for over 100 movies, including Bengali films and Hindi.

Apart from being a versatile composer, he also sang songs in folk style of East Bengal and light semi-classical. His son, R. D. Burman, was also a celebrated music composer for Bollywood films.

Burman's compositions were sung by the leading singers of the era, including Kishore Kumar, Lata Mangeshkar, Mohammed Rafi, Geeta Dutt, Manna Dey, Hemant Kumar, Asha Bhosle, Shamshad Begum, Mukesh and Talat Mahmood. As a playback singer, Burman sang 14 Hindi and 13 Bengali film songs.

== Background ==
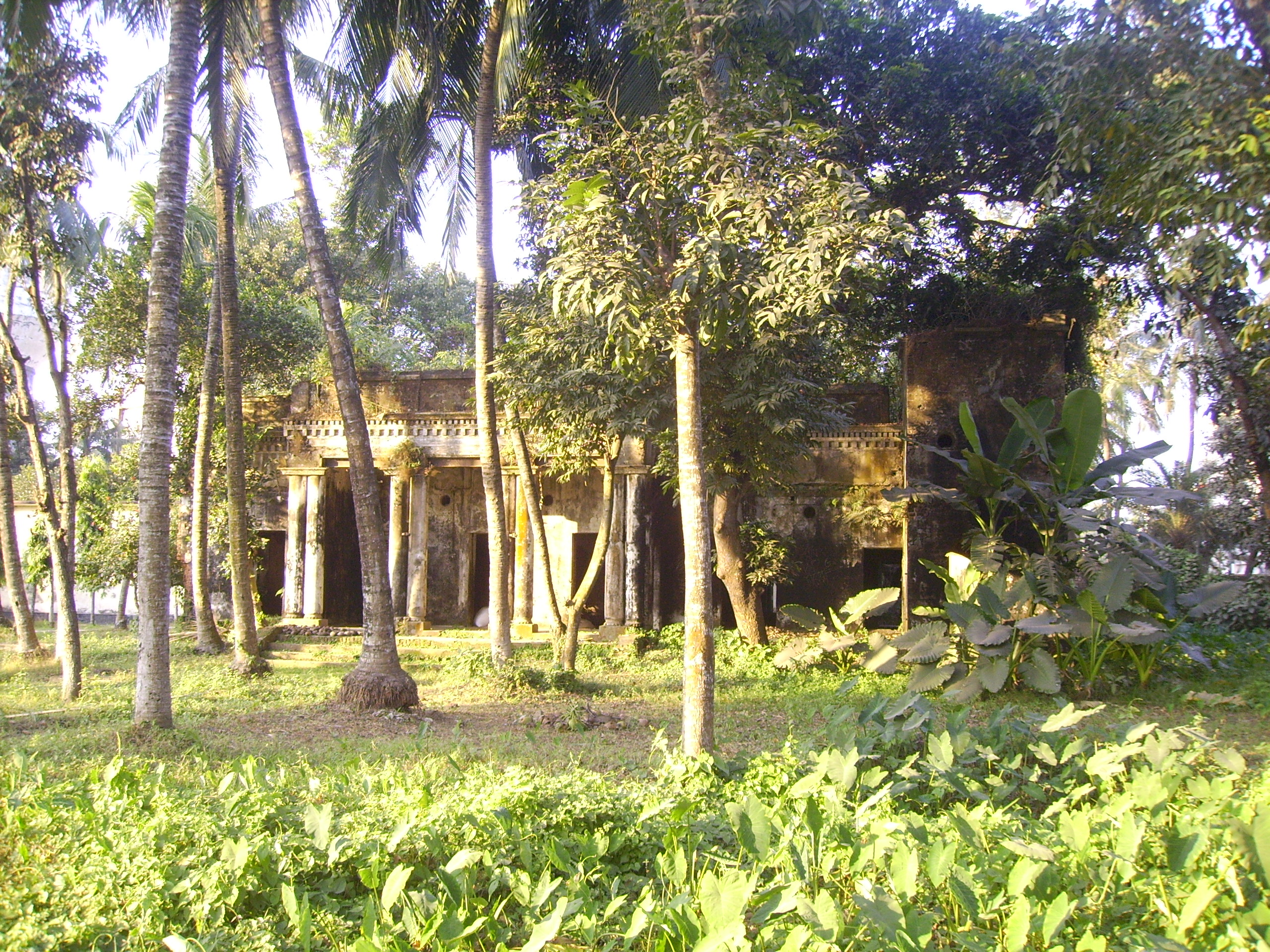
Sachin's abandoned house in Comilla

S. D. Burman was born on 1 October 1906, in Tipperah Palace, Comilla, Eastern Bengal and Assam (in present-day Bangladesh) to Rajkumari Nirmala Devi, the royal princess of Manipur and Nabadwipchandra Dev Burman of Tripura, son of Ishan Chandra Manikya, the Maharaja of Tripura. Sachin was the youngest of the five sons of his parents, who had nine children in all. His mother died when he was just two years of age.

== Education ==
S. D. Burman's first school was at Kumar Boarding in Agartala, Tripura. It was a boarding school for sons of the royalty and the very rich. Burman's father, Raja Nabadweepchandra Deb Burman noticed the teachers were more busy with pampering the sons of the nobility than educating them. Burman's father took him from Kumar Boarding and admitted him at Yusuf School in Comilla, before he was admitted in Class V in Comilla Zilla School. He completed his Matriculation in 1920 at the age of 14. He then got admitted at Victoria College, Comilla, which is presently Comilla Victoria Government College from where he passed his IA in 1922 and then BA in 1924. Burman left for Kolkata to start an MA in Calcutta University, which he did not finish as music got the better of him for good. He started his formal music education by training under the musician K. C. Dey from 1925 to 1930; thereafter in 1932 he came under the tutelage of Bhishmadev Chattopadhyay, who was only three years his senior. This was followed by training from Khalifa Badal Khan, the sarangi maestro, and Ustad Allauddin Khan, the sarod player.

== Career ==
=== 1930s ===
Burman started working as a radio singer on Calcutta Radio Station in the late 20s, when his work as a singer-composer was based on Bengali folk and light Hindustani classical music. Consequently, his compositions were mainly influenced by his huge repertoire of folk-tunes from present Bangladesh and later other parts of India and around the world. His first record was also released in 1932 (Hindustan Musical Product), with "Khamaj" (semi classical), "E Pathey Aaj Eso Priyo" on one side and the folk "Dakle Kokil Roj Bihane" on the reverse side, on 78 rpm for Hindustan Records. In the following decade, he reached his peak as a singer, cutting as many as 131 songs in Bengali, and also sang for composers like Himangsu Dutta (8), RC Boral (1), Nazrul Islam (4), Sailesh Das Gupta (2) and Subal Das Gupta (1). He also sang for Madhavlal Master (1) and his son R.D. Burman (1).

In 1934, he attended the All India Music Conference, at the invitation of Allahabad University, where he presented his Bengali Thumri, all to an illustrious audience, with the likes of Vijaya Lakshmi Pandit and the inimitable Abdul Karim Khan of Kirana Gharana. Later in the year, he was invited to Bengal Music Conference, Kolkata, which was inaugurated by Rabindranath Tagore, here again he sang his Thumri, and was awarded a Gold Medal.

He built a house in Southend Park, Ballygunge, Kolkata. He married his student, Meera Das Gupta (1920–2007), the granddaughter of Magistrate Raibahadur Kamalnath Dasgupta from Dhaka on 10 February 1938 in Calcutta (now Kolkata), though according to some, having married a non-royal, created a furore within the royal family, and subsequently he severed ties with his family, and forfeited his inheritance. According to some others, S.D. Burman severed ties with his royal family because he was frustrated with the unjust and unfair treatment meted out to his father and his brothers by the royal family of Tripura. The couple's only child, Rahul Dev Burman was born in 1939, and later, both Meera Devi and Rahul assisted S.D. Burman with some of the musical compositions. S. D. Burman also did a singing role in the Urdu film Selima (1934) and another role in Dhiren Ganguli's film Bidrohi (1935).

As a music composer, he started with the Bengali plays Sati Tirtha and Janani, and eventually gave his first score in the film Rajgee. In 1937, his second film Rajkumarer Nirbashan (1940) became a hit. He gave music in Bengali films such as Protishodh (1941), Avayer Biye (1942) and Chaddobeshi (1944) and only one Bengali film in 1969/70 after he permanently moved to Mumbai in 1946. He composed for over 20 Bengali films and 89 Hindi films in all.

He made his film debut singing in Yahudi Ki Ladki (1933) but the songs were scrapped and re-sung by Pahari Sanyal. His first film as a singer was finally Sanjher Pidim (1935).

=== 1940s ===
In 1944, Burman moved to Bombay (now known as Mumbai), at the request of Sashadhar Mukherjee of Filmistan, who asked him to give score for two Ashok Kumar starrers, Shikari (1946) and Aath Din, but his first major breakthrough came the following year with the company's Do Bhai (1947). The song Mera Sundar Sapna Beet Gaya sung by Geeta Dutt was his breakthrough song into the film industry. In 1949 came Shabnam, his biggest hit yet with Filmistan Studios, especially noticeable for its multi-lingual hit song Yeh Duniya Roop ki Chor, by Shamshad Begum, which became a rage in those days.

=== 1950s ===
Disillusioned with the materialism of Bombay, Burman left the Ashok Kumar-starrer Mashaal (1950) incomplete, and decided to board the first train back to Calcutta. Fortunately, he was dissuaded from doing so.

In the 1950s, Burman teamed up with Dev Anand's Navketan Films to create musical hits like Taxi Driver, Nau Do Gyarah (1957) and Kala Pani (1958). In addition, he gave music for Munimji (1955) and Paying Guest (1957). His songs sung by Kishore Kumar and Mohammed Rafi became popular. Burman composed the music for Afsar (1950). With the success of their second film Baazi (1951), he made it to the top and a long association with Navketan and Dev Anand was on its way. Baazi's jazzy musical score revealed a new facet of singer Geeta Dutt, who was mainly known for melancholy songs and bhajans. One song from the film stood out; "Tadbeer Se Bigdi Hui Taqdeer", a ghazal that was occidentalised into a seductive song. The Jaal song "Yeh Raat Yeh Chandni" sung by Hemant Kumar is an all-time great classic. The song "Thandi Hawain" from the film Naujawan (1951) sung by Lata Mangeshkar was one of his first major hits. It made Lata very famous as also poet Sahir Ludhianvi who also wrote music for Guru Dutt's film Pyaasa (1957). The soundtracks of Devdas (1955), House No. 44 (1955), Funtoosh (1956), and Solva Saal (1958) were other S. D. Burman hits. In 1959 came Sujata, and S. D. created magic again with "Jalte Hain Jiske Liye" film song sung by Talat Mahmood.

When Guru Dutt made comparatively light-weight films like Baazi and Jaal (1952), Burman reflected their mood with compositions like "Suno Gajar Kya Gaye" or "De Bhi Chuke Hum" and when Guru Dutt made his sombre masterpieces; Pyaasa (1957) and Kaagaz Ke Phool (1959), he was right on target with "Jinhe Naaz Hai Hind" and "Waqt Ne Kiya Kya Haseen Sitam." In 2004, the soundtrack of Pyaasa was chosen as one of "The Best Music in Film" by Sight & Sound, the British Film Institute magazine.

In 1957, S. D. Burman fell out with Lata Mangeshkar and adopted her younger sister Asha Bhosle as his lead female singer. The team of S. D. Burman, Kishore Kumar, Asha Bhosle and lyricist Majrooh Sultanpuri became popular for their duet songs. Bhosle later became his daughter-in-law after her marriage to R. D. Burman.

In 1958, S. D. Burman gave music for Kishore Kumar's house production Chalti Ka Naam Gaadi. The same year, he was awarded the Sangeet Natak Akademi Award for his compositions in Sujata and remains the only music director to have won this prestigious award. S. D. Burman often took inspiration from folk music, Hindustani classical music as well as the more mundane day to day sounds of life. For example, in a later interview, he discussed how he had composed the Kala Pani tune for the Majrooh Sultanpuri and Md. Rafi song "Hum Bekhudi Mein Tum" based upon the Hindustani Raga "Raag Chayyanat" and the Muslim Muezzin's call for prayers that one hears daily near a mosque.

=== 1960s ===
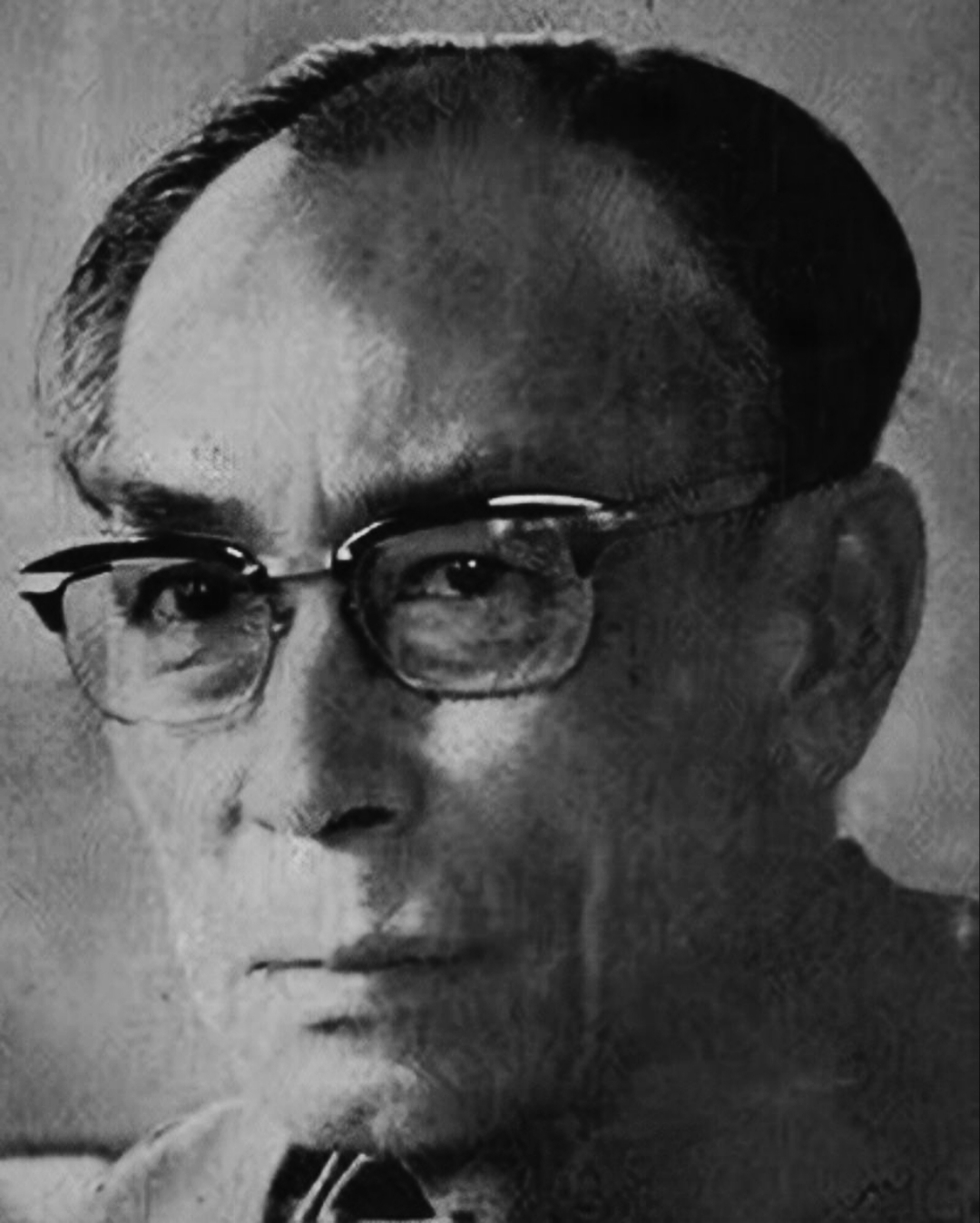
Burman in 1969

Early on in his career, Burman refused to allow his voice to be lip-synced on film by actors; as a result, even later on, in Hindi cinema, his thin yet powerful voice was often used as bardic commentary to haunting results, as in "O Re Majhi Mere Sajan Hai Us Paar" from Bandini (1963), "Wahan Kaun Hai Tera" from Guide (1965), and "Saphal Hogi Teri Aradhana" from Aradhana (1969), for which he received the National Film Award for Best Male Playback Singer in 1970.

Ill health caused a slump in his career in the early 1960s, but he gave many hit films in the late 1960s. In 1961, Burman and Lata Mangeshkar came together with the help of Mehmood during the recording of R.D. Burman's first song for the movie Chhote Nawab (1961). They reconciled their differences and started working again in 1962.

The Dev Anand-S. D. Burman partnership, under the Navketan banner, continued to churn out musical hits like Bombai Ka Babu (1960), Tere Ghar Ke Samne (1963), Guide (1965) and Jewel Thief (1967). In 1963, he composed the soundtrack of Meri Surat Teri Aankhen (1963), in which Manna Dey sang the song "Poocho Na Kaise Maine" in raga Ahir Bhairav. This song was inspired by the song "Arun kanti ke go yogi", a masterpiece that was created by Bidhrohi Kabi Kazi Nazrul Islam and a Ustad Mushtaq Hussain Khan's Khayal which was based on raga Ahir bhairav (morning ragaa). That movie also had a song "Nache Mon Mora Magan", sung by Mohammad Rafi, and a duet "Ye Kisne Geet Chheda" sung by Mukesh and Suman Kalyanpur; these became landmarks in Hindi film songs.

Suman Kalyanpur also collaborated with S. D. Burman on several other notable films during this period. In Miya Bibi Razi (1960), she recorded multiple songs, including the popular solo "Chhodo Chhodo Mori Baiyan". This was followed by the hit duet with Hemant Kumar, "Na Tum Hamen Jano," for the film Baat Ek Raat Ki (1962). In 1964, she sang the Raga Adana based "Manmohan Man Mein Ho Tumhi" with Mohammed Rafi and Shiv Dayal Batish for the film Kaise Kahoon.

Other S. D. Burman hits from this period were Bandini (1963), Ziddi (1964), and Teen Devian (1965). In Bandini, Sampooran Singh (well known as Gulzar), made his debut as a lyricist with the song "Mora Gora Ang Lai Le", though the other songs were written by Shailendra. Guide (1965) starring Dev Anand, was probably the best of his work during the time with all the songs super-hits as well as the film; however, it did not receive the Filmfare Award in the best music director category for that year, which remained always a discussion among the Bollywood film pandits.

Aradhana (1969) is considered another landmark score in Bollywood history. The music of the movie shaped the careers of singer Kishore Kumar, lyricist Anand Bakshi and filmmaker Shakti Samanta. According to the director Shakti Samanta, originally, Mohammed Rafi was supposed to have sung all the songs in the film (he sang only two song), but he was on 2 month long tour and they didn't want to wait for 2 months. So, he suggested Burman to use Kishore Kumar instead as Rajesh Khanna was a newcomer and he agreed. All the songs became chartbuster which made Kishore Kumar an overnight sensation.

For the song "Mere Sapno Ki Rani", Sachin Dev made R. D. play the mouth organ. Dev Anand and S. D. Burman continued their musical partnership in Prem Pujari (1970).

=== 1970s ===
Prem Pujari (1970), Tere Mere Sapne (1971), Ishq Par Zor Nahin (1970), Sharmeelee (1971), Abhimaan (1973), Prem Nagar (1974), Sagina (1974), Chupke Chupke (1975), and Mili (1975) are some of Burman's classics from this decade.

== Personal life ==
S. D. Burman married Bengali film lyricist and musician, Meera Dasgupta on 10 February 1938. They had only one son, music composer R. D. Burman, who was born on 27 June 1939.

=== Relationship with Kishore Kumar ===
Burman was the only composer who had used both Kishore and Rafi in an almost equal number of songs. He regarded Kishore as his second son. Kishore confessed that it was Sachin Da, who had given him the first chance. Even after the rehearsal of "Badi Sooni Sooni" from Milli, when Sachin had a stroke, Kishore went up to the hospital and reportedly said to him "Dada, please don't worry, your recording is after three days, you just see how well it goes." The song is considered one of the best performances of Kishore Kumar. Sachin also used to call Kishore in the dead of night, and on the telephone, he would start to sing the new tunes which he composed and ask Kishore to sing with him.

== Death ==
S. D. Burman went into a coma soon after rehearsing the song "Badi Sooni Sooni Hai" (sung by Kishore Kumar) for the film Mili. After lingering in a coma for some days, he died on 31 October 1975 in Mumbai.

== Legacy ==
British singer of South Asian heritage Najma Akhtar, recorded a Shanachie Records CD of Burman's work, Forbidden Kiss: The Music of S.D. Burman, an album of covers of Burman compositions.

The Indian cricketer Sachin Tendulkar was named after the composer by Sachin's father, who was an ardent fan of Burman.

The singer and mimicry artist Sudesh Bhonsle frequently parodies the nasal high-pitched voice and quixotic singing style of S. D. Burman.

Burman paired with tabla maestro late Brajen Biswas for his Bengali songs. The beats or "thekas" created by Brajen Babu for these songs are unique and no one in the world can sing these songs in the original "thekas". All the "thekas" are according to the mood of the songs. But recently, painter, sculptor and singer Ramita Bhaduri sang the tough songs of Burman such as "Ami chhinu aka", "Rangeela", "Aankhi Duti Jhare" etc. in the original "theka" on the taleem of Brajen Biswas. The CD from "Raga Music" (Symphony) was released at Kolkata Press Club. The CDs are available in M. Biswas & Symphony.

Burman had a unique style of composing film songs. While most of the composers used a harmonium or piano to compose the tune, he composed tunes using rhythm such as clapping hands. He was very fond of "Paan" which was specially made by his wife with a piece of dried orange peel and "kevda" flower (Odoratissimus flower) for flavour and taste. In addition, there were his chosen paanwalas (paan vendors) near Khar Station, his bungalow "The Jet" and Bharati Vidya Bhavan from where he could get paans to his liking. That was the reason that he would not share his paan with anyone as he will run short of his paans. He would carry only few extra paana which he would give as a reward to the one whom he appreciated for his work.

SD Burman's first biography in English was titled Incomparable Sachin Dev Burman. Written by HQ Chowdhury, it was published by Toitoomber from Dhaka, Bangladesh.

== Commemorative postage stamp ==
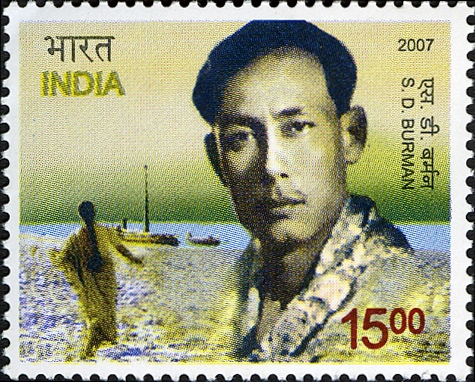
Burman on a 2007 stamp of India, commemorating his 101st birth anniversary

On 1 October 2007, marking his 101st birth anniversary, the Indian Postal Service released a commemorative postage stamp, in Agartala, where an exhibition on his life and work was also inaugurated; the state government of Tripura also confers the yearly "Sachin Dev Burman Memorial Award" in music.

Sachin Dev Barman Memorial Government Music college was built in Agartala, Tripura in memory of him which is also affiliated to Tripura University and recognised by University Grant Commission.

His song "Ye Duniya Agar Mil Bhi Jaye" from Pyaasa was re-used in the 2022 film Chup: Revenge of the Artist.

== Filmography ==
- Sudurer Priye (1935)
- Rajgee (1937)
- Jakher Dhan (1939)
- Amar Geeti (1940)
- Nari (1940)
- Rajkumarer Nirbashan (1940)
- Pratishodh (1941)
- Ashok (1942)
- Avayer Biye (1942)
- Jibon Sangini (1942)
- Mahakavi Kalidas (1942)
- Milan (1942)
- Jajsaheber Nathni (1943)
- Chhadmabeshi (1944)
- Maatir Ghar (1944)
- Pratikar (1944)
- Kalankini (1945)
- Matrihara (1946)
- Eight Days (1946)
- Shikari (1946)
- Dil Ki Rani (1947)
- Do Bhai (1947)
- Chittor Vijay (1947)
- Vidya (1948)
- Shabnam (1949)
- Kamal (1949)
- Mashaal / Samar (In Bengali) (1950)
- Afsar (1950) (Navketan's first production)
- Pyar (1950)
- Buzdil (1951)
- Sazaa (1951)
- Naujawan (1951)
- Baazi (1951)
- Bahar (1951)
- Ek Nazar (1951)
- Jaal (1952)
- Lal Kunwar (1952)
- Armaan (1953)
- Shahenshah (1953)
- Babla (1953)
- Jeevan Jyoti (1953)
- Taxi Driver (1954)
- Angarey (1954)
- Radha Krishna (1954)
- Chalis Baba Ek Chor (1954)
- Devdas (1955)
- Munimji (1955)
- House No. 44 (1955)
- Society (1955)
- Mad Bhare Nain (1955)
- Funtoosh (1956)
- Paying Guest (1957)
- Pyaasa (1957)
- Nau Do Gyarah (1957)
- Miss India (1957)
- Solva Saal (1958)
- Lajwanti (1958)
- Chalti Ka Naam Gaadi (1958)
- Kala Pani (1958)
- Sitaron Se Aage (1958)
- Sujata (1959)
- Kaagaz Ke Phool (1959)
- Insaan Jaag Utha (1959)
- Manzil (1960)
- Kala Bazar (1960)
- Bombai Ka Babu (1960)
- Miyan Biwi Razi (1960)
- Apna haath jagannath (1960)
- Bewaqoof (1960)
- Ek Ke Baad Ek (1960)
- Baat Ek Raat Ki (1962)
- Dr. Vidya (1962)
- Naughty Boy (1962)
- Bandini (1963)
- Meri Surat Teri Ankhen (1963)
- Tere Ghar Ke Samne (1963)
- Ziddi (1964)
- Kaise Kahoon (1964)
- Benazir (1964)
- Teen Devian (1965)
- Guide (1965)
- Jewel Thief (1967)
- Talash (1969)
- Aradhana (1969)
- Jyoti (1969)
- Prem Pujari (1970)
- Ishq Par Zor Nahin (1970)
- Gambler (1971)
- Naya Zamana (1971)
- Sharmilee (1971)
- Chaitali (1971)
- Tere Mere Sapne (1971)
- Yeh Gulistan Hamara (1972)
- Zindagi Zindagi (1972)
- Anuraag (1972)
- Abhimaan (1973)
- Jugnu (1973)
- Chhupa Rustam (1973)
- Phagun (1973)
- Us Paar (1974)
- Prem Nagar (1974)
- Sagina (1974)
- Chupke Chupke (1975)
- Mili (1975)
- Barood (1976)
- Arjun Pandit (1976)
- Deewaangee (1976) only one song, all other songs were composed by Ravindra Jain
- Tyaag (1977)

== Awards and recognitions ==
- 1934: Gold Medal, Bengal All India Music Conference, Calcutta 1934
- 1958: Sangeet Natak Akademi Award
- 1959: Asia Film Society Award
- 1964: Sant Haridas Award
- National Film Awards for
  - 1970: National Film Award for Best Male Playback Singer: Aradhana: Safal Hogi Teri Aradhana
  - 1974: National Film Award for Best Music Direction: Zindagi Zindagi
- 1969: Padma Shri Award
- International Jury on Folk Music
  - 2007 A Postage Stamp (Face value Rs 15) released in his memory
- Filmfare Awards
  - 1954: Filmfare Best Music Director Award: Taxi Driver - (Won)
  - 1973: Filmfare Best Music Director Award: Abhimaan - (Won)
  - 1959: Filmfare Best Music Director Award: Sujata: Nomination
  - 1965: Filmfare Best Music Director Award: Guide: Nomination
  - 1969: Filmfare Best Music Director Award : Aradhana: Nomination
  - 1970: Filmfare Best Music Director Award: Talaash: Nomination
  - 1974: Filmfare Best Music Director Award: Prem Nagar : Nomination
- BFJA Awards
  - 1965: Best Music (Hindi Section): Teen Devian
  - 1966: Best Music (Hindi Section): Guide
  - 1966: Best Male Playback Singer (Hindi Section): Guide
  - 1969: Best Music (Hindi Section): Aradhana
  - 1973: Best Music (Hindi Section): Abhimaan
