= Nilesh Sahay =

Indian Bollywood actor

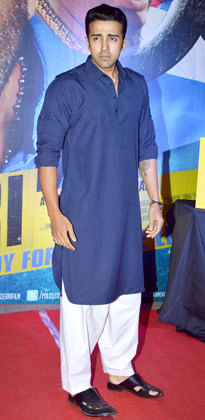
- Sahay in 2013
- Born: 20 October 1982 (age 43); Mumbai, Maharashtra, India
- Occupations: Actor; Filmmaker; Director; Writer
- Parent: Zaheeda (mother)

Nilesh Sahay (born October 20, 1982) is an Indian actor, filmmaker, director and writer. He is the son of former Bollywood actress Zaheeda Hussain, niece of actress Nargis Dutt.

== Life ==
Sahay is the son of the actress Zaheeda. His great-grandmother Jaddan Bai was the country's first female film producer and music composer. His maternal grandfather Akhtar Hussain was an actor, producer, director and writer and his grandaunt and uncle Nargis Dutt and Sunil Dutt were also actors. Sahay is the nephew of Bollywood actor Sanjay Dutt.

Nilesh belongs to a family of Indian landlords. His great grandfather, Shyan Nandan Sahay, was an Indian landlord, educationist, legislator and the founder vice chancellor of Babasaheb Bhimrao Ambedkar Bihar University Muzaffarpur. Born in the Indian state of Bihar, Shyan also served as the vice chancellor of Patna University. He was a member of the 1st Lok Sabha, elected from Muzaffarpur Central constituency on Indian National Congress candidature. The Government of India awarded him the third highest civilian honour, the Padma Bhushan, in 1957, for his contributions to education. A road in Muzaffarpur is named Padma Bhushan Shyan Nandan Sahay.

== Career ==
Sahay made his film debut in Ganesh Acharaya's 2011 film Angel. He later turned filmmaker and started filming Squad, his directorial debut, in September 2019 at Belarusfilm studios in Minsk.

Sahay is currently director of the upcoming production, Ambush, starring Harshvardhan Rane.

== Filmography ==
Year	Film	Role	Notes
2011	Angel	Actor (as Abhay)	
2021	Squad	Director	
