= Krrish (soundtrack) =

Soundtrack album by Rajesh Roshan
- Released: 28 April 2006
- Recorded: 2005–2006
- Genre: Feature film soundtrack
- Length: 42:58
- Label: T-Series
- Producer: Rajesh Roshan

Rajesh Roshan chronology
Aetbaar (2004)	Krrish (2006)	Krazzy 4 (2008)

Krrish is the soundtrack album to the 2006 film of the same name written, directed and produced by Rakesh Roshan, starring Hrithik Roshan, Priyanka Chopra, Naseeruddin Shah, Rekha, Sharat Saxena and Manini Mishra. The soundtrack featured music composed by Rajesh Roshan and lyrics written by Ibrahim Ashk, Nasir Faraaz and Vijay Akela. The album was released under the T-Series label on 28 April 2006.

== Development ==
Krrish's soundtrack featured music composed by Rajesh Roshan, Rakesh's brother and norm composer, who had also composed music for its predecessor Koi... Mil Gaya (2003). Salim–Sulaiman provided the background score. The album featured lyrics written by Ibrahim Ashk, Nasir Faraaz and Vijay Akela. It was released under the T-Series label on 28 April 2006. The album was further dubbed and released in Tamil and Telugu languages, under the lyrics of Piraisoodan and Rajshri Sudhakar, respectively.

== Track listing ==
=== Hindi ===
No.	Title	Lyrics	Singers	Length
1.	"Pyaar Ki Ek Kahaani"	Ibrahim Ashk	Sonu Nigam, Shreya Ghoshal	6:28
2.	"Koi Tumsa Nahin"	Nasir Faraaz	Sonu Nigam, Shreya Ghoshal	6:15
3.	"Chori Chori Chupke Chupke"	Nasir Faraaz	Udit Narayan, Shreya Ghoshal	6:28
4.	"Dil Na Diya"	Vijay Akela	Kunal Ganjawala	5:54
5.	"Main Hoon Woh Aasmaan"	Nasir Faraaz	Rafaqat Ali Khan, Alka Yagnik	6:40
6.	"Big Band Mix"		Sonu Nigam, Shreya Ghoshal	6:01
7.	"Mystic Love Mix"		Rafaqat Ali Khan, Alka Yagnik	5:12
Total length:				42:58

=== Tamil ===
No.	Title	Lyrics	Singers	Length
1.	"Then Vadikkum"	Piraisoodan	Sonu Nigam, Shreya Ghoshal	6:28
2.	"Un Pol Yaarum"	Piraisoodan	Sonu Nigam, Shreya Ghoshal	6:15
3.	"Sokki Sokki Summa"	Piraisoodan	Udit Narayan, Shreya Ghoshal	6:28
4.	"Dil Illaiya"	Piraisoodan	Kunal Ganjawala	5:54
5.	"Naane Un Vaaname"	Piraisoodan	Gopal Rao, Alka Yagnik	6:40
6.	"Big Band Mix"		Sonu Nigam, Shreya Ghoshal	6:01
7.	"Mystic Love Mix"		Gopal Rao, Alka Yagnik	5:12
Total length:				42:58

=== Telugu ===
No.	Title	Lyrics	Singers	Length
1.	"Khata Vintawa"	Rajshri Sudhakar	Sonu Nigam, Shreya Ghoshal	6:28
2.	"Nuvvu Puttindadi"	Rajshri Sudhakar	Sonu Nigam, Shreya Ghoshal	6:15
3.	"Yadoo Yadoo Chappanamma"	Rajshri Sudhakar	Udit Narayan, Shreya Ghoshal	6:28
4.	"Gunde Aadina"	Rajshri Sudhakar	Kunal Ganjawala	5:54
5.	"Nene Nene Mo Ningeeni"	Rajshri Sudhakar	Gopal Rao, Alka Yagnik	6:40
6.	"Big Band Mix"		Sonu Nigam, Shreya Ghoshal	6:01
7.	"Mystic Love Mix"		Gopal Rao, Alka Yagnik	5:12
Total length:				42:58

== Reception ==
Critical reviews of the soundtrack were generally favourable, though some in the media called it a disappointment. Joginder Tuteja of Bollywood Hungama gave the album a rating of 3.5 out of 5 stars, saying that it was "another good outing for Bollywood music lovers." He especially praised the songs "Chori Chori", "Koi Tumsa Nahi" and "Pyaar Ki Ek Kahaani." Sukanya Verma of Rediff.com gave a favourable review for the soundtrack's "catchy" songs. However, she felt that while the songs meshed with the film, "none of them bear the staying power of Rajesh Roshan's earlier soundtracks."

Dr. Mandar V. Bichu of Gulf News said that it did not live up to the pre-release expectations, adding "most of the tunes sound like they've been rehashed from past popular tracks" though the album had few good songs. Nikhat Kazmi of The Times of India added that the album "promises to be no chartbuster", and praised the choreography.

The album was the seventh highest-selling Bollywood soundtrack of the year, according to Box Office India.

== Awards and nominations ==
Award (Note: Awards, festivals and organizations are in alphabetical order.)	Date of ceremony (Note: Date is linked to the article about the awards held that year, wherever possible.)	Category	Recipient(s)	Result	Ref.
Filmfare Awards	17 February 2007	Best Background Score	Salim–Sulaiman	Won	
International Indian Film Academy Awards	7–9 June 2007	Best Background Score	Salim–Sulaiman	Won	
Screen Awards	6 January 2007	Best Sound Recording	Nakul Kamte	Nominated	
