= IIFA Award for Best Actor =

Indian film awards

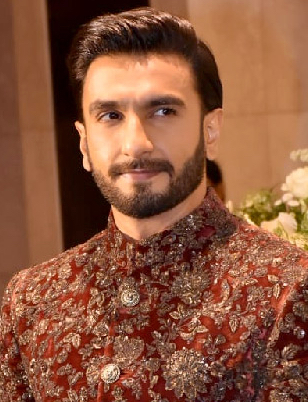
- The 2026 Recipient: Ranveer Singh
- Awarded for: Best Performance by an Actor in a Leading Role
- Country: India
- Presented by: International Indian Film Academy
- First award: Sanjay Dutt, Vaastav: The Reality (2000)
- Currently held by: Ranveer Singh, Dhurandhar (2026)
- Website: IIFA Awards

The IIFA Award for Best Actor recognizes leading male actor who has delivered an outstanding performance in a leading role. The recipient is chosen by viewers and the winner is announced at the ceremony. With 5 awards, Hrithik Roshan and Shahrukh Khan hold the record for most wins in this category.

== Superlatives ==
=== Multiple winners ===
- 5 Wins: Hrithik Roshan & Shah Rukh Khan
- 3 Wins: Shahid Kapoor, Ranveer Singh
- 2 Wins: Amitabh Bachchan, Ranbir Kapoor,

=== Multiple nominees ===
- 18 Nominations: Shah Rukh Khan
- 11 Nominations: Hrithik Roshan
- 10 Nominations: Ranbir Kapoor
- 9 Nominations: Salman Khan
- 8 Nominations: Amitabh Bachchan, Ajay Devgn
- 7 Nominations: Aamir Khan
- 6 Nominations: Ranveer Singh
- 5 Nominations: Shahid Kapoor, Abhishek Bachchan
- 4 Nominations: Sanjay Dutt, Saif Ali Khan, Vicky Kaushal, Rajkummar Rao
- 3 Nominations: Akshay Kumar, Ayushmann Khurrana, Irrfan Khan
- 2 Nominations: Sushant Singh Rajput, Manoj Bajpayee, Sunny Deol, Kartik Aaryan

Superlative	Actor	Record
Actor with most awards	Hrithik Roshan, Shah Rukh Khan	5
Actor with most nominations	Shah Rukh Khan	18
Actor with most consecutive nominations	Shah Rukh Khan	11 (2001–2009)
Actor with most consecutive wins	Ranbir Kapoor	2 (2012–2013)
Actor with most nominations without ever winning	Salman Khan	9
Actor with most nominations in a single year	Aamir Khan (2002); Ajay Devgan (2003); Shah Rukh Khan (2005, 2007); Amitabh Bachchan (2006); Saif Ali Khan (2006)	2
Eldest Winner	Amitabh Bachchan	68
Eldest Nominee	Amitabh Bachchan	75
Youngest Winner	Hrithik Roshan	27
Youngest Nominee	Hrithik Roshan, Shahid Kapoor	27

- Amitabh Bachchan, Irrfan, Farhan Akhtar and Vicky Kaushal are the recipients who also won the IIFA Award for Best Supporting Actor.
- Hrithik Roshan, Shahid Kapoor, Ranbir Kapoor, Farhan Akhtar, Ranveer Singh and Vicky Kaushal are the recipients who also won the IIFA Award for Best Male Debut.
- Farhan Akhtar and Vicky Kaushal are the only actors who won in all three big categories: Best Actor, Best Supporting Actor and Best Male Debut.
- Hrithik Roshan achieved supremacy in the 2000s with 4 wins. Ranbir Kapoor, Shahid Kapoor and Ranveer Singh took over in the 2010s with 2 wins each.
- Sanjay Dutt, Hrithik Roshan, Shah Rukh Khan and Kartik Aaryan are the only actors to be nominated twice for the same role. Sanjay Dutt was nominated in 2004 and 2007 for his portrayal of Munna Bhai in Munnabhai MBBS and Lage Raho Munnabhai. Hrithik Roshan achieved this feat twice in the Krrish franchise; he was nominated for his role as Krishna Mehra for Krrish in 2007 and 2014 for Krrish 3 (he won in 2007), and for his role as Rohit Mehra in 2004 for Koi... Mil Gaya and 2014 for Krrish 3 (he won in 2004). Shah Rukh Khan was nominated in 2007 and 2012 for his portrayal of the titular character in Don and Don 2 respectively. Kartik Aaryan was nominated in 2023 and 2025 for his portrayal of Rooh Baba in Bhool Bhulaiyaa 2 and Bhool Bhulaiyaa 3 (he won in 2025).
- In 2000, both Ajay Devgan and Salman Khan were nominated for the same film – Hum Dil De Chuke Sanam. However, none of them won.
- Shah Rukh Khan is the only actor to secure wins in the category in all three decades (2000s, 2010s, 2020s), winning in 2003, 2005, 2008, 2011 and 2024.
- Hrithik Roshan holds the record for the longest gap between Best Actor wins, spanning 14 years between 2009 (Jodhaa Akbar) and 2023 (Vikram Vedha).

== List of winners ==
- † – indicates the performance won the Filmfare Award for Best Actor
- ‡ – indicates the performance was nominated for the Filmfare Award for Best Actor

=== 2000s ===
- 2000 Sanjay Dutt – Vaastav: The Reality as Raghunath "Raghu" Namdev Shivalkar †
  - Aamir Khan – Sarfarosh as ACP Ajay Singh Rathod ‡
  - Ajay Devgan – Hum Dil De Chuke Sanam as Vanraj ‡
  - Govinda – Haseena Maan Jaayegi as Monu
  - Salman Khan – Hum Dil De Chuke Sanam as Sameer ‡
- 2001 Hrithik Roshan – Kaho Naa... Pyaar Hai as Rohit / Raj †
  - Akshay Kumar – Dhadkan as Ram
  - Anil Kapoor – Pukar as Major Jaidev Rajvansh ‡
  - Sanjay Dutt – Mission Kashmir as SSP Inayat Khan ‡
  - Shah Rukh Khan – Mohabbatein as Raj Aryan Malhotra ‡
- 2002 Aamir Khan – Lagaan as Bhuvan †
  - Aamir Khan – Dil Chahta Hai as Akash Malhotra ‡
  - Amitabh Bachchan – Aks as Inspector Manu Verma ‡
  - Shah Rukh Khan – Kabhi Khushi Kabhie Gham as Rahul Raichand ‡
  - Sunny Deol – Gadar: Ek Prem Katha as Tara Singh ‡
- 2003 Shah Rukh Khan – Devdas as Devdas Mukherjee †
  - Ajay Devgan – Company as Malik ‡
  - Ajay Devgan – The Legend of Bhagat Singh as Bhagat Singh
  - Akshaye Khanna – Deewangee as Raj Goyal
  - Amitabh Bachchan – Kaante as Yashvardhan Rampal 'Major' ‡
- 2004 Hrithik Roshan – Koi... Mil Gaya as Rohit Mehra †
  - Amitabh Bachchan – Baghban as Raj Malhotra ‡
  - Salman Khan – Tere Naam as Radhe Mohan ‡
  - Sanjay Dutt – Munna Bhai M.B.B.S. as Murli Prasad Sharma / Munna Bhai
  - Shah Rukh Khan – Kal Ho Naa Ho as Aman Mathur ‡
- 2005 Shah Rukh Khan – Veer-Zaara as Veer Pratap Singh ‡
  - Nana Patekar – Ab Tak Chhappan as Inspector Sadhu Agashe
  - Saif Ali Khan – Hum Tum as Karan Kapoor
  - Salman Khan – Mujhse Shaadi Karogi as Sameer Malhotra
  - Shah Rukh Khan – Swades as Mohan Bhargava †
- 2006 Amitabh Bachchan – Black as Debraj Sahai †
  - Abhishek Bachchan – Bunty Aur Babli as Rakesh Trivedi / Bunty ‡
  - Amitabh Bachchan – Sarkar as Subhash 'Sarkar' Nagre ‡
  - Saif Ali Khan – Parineeta as Shekhar Rai ‡
  - Saif Ali Khan – Salaam Namaste as Nikhil "Nick" Arora
  - Shah Rukh Khan – Paheli as Kishanlal / Prem
- 2007 Hrithik Roshan – Krrish as Krishna (Krrish) Mehra / Rohit Mehra ‡
  - Aamir Khan – Rang De Basanti as Daljeet 'DJ' / Chandrashekhar Azad ‡
  - Ajay Devgan – Omkara as Omkara 'Omi' Shukla
  - Sanjay Dutt – Lage Raho Munna Bhai as Murli Prasad Sharma / Munna Bhai ‡
  - Shah Rukh Khan – Don as Don / Vijay ‡
  - Shah Rukh Khan – Kabhi Alvida Naa Kehna as Dev Saran ‡
- 2008 Shah Rukh Khan – Chak De! India as Kabir Khan †
  - Abhishek Bachchan – Guru as Gurukant "Guru" Desai ‡
  - Akshay Kumar – Bhool Bhulaiyaa as Dr. Aditya Shrivastav
  - Salman Khan – Partner as Prem "Love Guru"
  - Shahid Kapoor – Jab We Met as Aditya Kashyap ‡
- 2009 Hrithik Roshan – Jodhaa Akbar as Jalaluddin Mohammad Akbar †
  - Aamir Khan – Ghajini as Sanjay Singhania ‡
  - Abhishek Bachchan – Dostana as Sameer ‡
  - Naseeruddin Shah – A Wednesday! as The Common Man ‡
  - Shah Rukh Khan – Rab Ne Bana Di Jodi as Surinder "Suri" Sahni / Raj ‡

=== 2010s ===
- 2010 Amitabh Bachchan – Paa as Auro †
  - Aamir Khan – 3 Idiots as Ranchhoddas 'Rancho' Shyamaldas Chhanchad / Phunsukh Wangdu ‡
  - Ranbir Kapoor – Wake Up Sid as Siddharth "Sid" Mehra ‡
  - Saif Ali Khan – Love Aaj Kal as Jai Vardhan Singh / Veer Singh ‡
  - Salman Khan – Wanted as Radhe
  - Shahid Kapoor – Kaminey as Charlie / Guddu ‡
- 2011 Shah Rukh Khan – My Name is Khan as Rizwan Khan †
  - Ajay Devgn – Once Upon a Time in Mumbaai as Sultan Mirza ‡
  - Hrithik Roshan – Guzaarish as Ethan Mascarenhas ‡
  - Ranbir Kapoor – Raajneeti as Samar Pratap ‡
  - Salman Khan – Dabangg as Chulbul Pandey ‡
- 2012 Ranbir Kapoor – Rockstar as Janardhan Jordan Jakhar †
  - Ajay Devgn – Singham as Inspector Bajirao Singham ‡
  - Hrithik Roshan – Zindagi Na Milegi Dobara as Arjun ‡
  - Salman Khan – Bodyguard as Lovely Singh ‡
  - Shah Rukh Khan – Don 2 as Don ‡
- 2013 Ranbir Kapoor – Barfi! as Murphy "Barfi" Johnson †
  - Ayushmann Khurrana – Vicky Donor as Vicky Arora
  - Hrithik Roshan – Agneepath as Vijay Deenanath Chauhan ‡
  - Irrfan Khan – Paan Singh Tomar as Paan Singh Tomar ‡
  - Manoj Bajpai – Gangs of Wasseypur – Part 1 as Sardar Khan ‡
  - Shah Rukh Khan – Jab Tak Hai Jaan as Samar Anand ‡
- 2014 Farhan Akhtar – Bhaag Milkha Bhaag as Milkha Singh †
  - Hrithik Roshan – Krrish 3 as Krishna (Krrish) Mehra / Rohit Mehra ‡
  - Ranbir Kapoor – Yeh Jawaani Hai Deewani as Kabir "Bunny" Thapar ‡
  - Ranveer Singh – Goliyon Ki Raasleela Ram-Leela as Ram Rajari ‡
  - Shah Rukh Khan – Chennai Express as Rahul Mithaiwala ‡
  - Sushant Singh Rajput – Kai Po Che! as Ishaan Bhatt
- 2015 Shahid Kapoor – Haider as Haider Meer †
  - Aamir Khan – PK as PK ‡
  - Arjun Kapoor – 2 States as Krish Malhotra
  - Hrithik Roshan – Bang Bang as Rajveer / Jai Nanda ‡
  - Randeep Hooda – Highway as Mahabir Bhati
  - Shah Rukh Khan – Happy New Year as Chandramohan Manohar Sharma a.k.a. Charlie
- 2016 Ranveer Singh – Bajirao Mastani as Peshwa Bajirao †
  - Amitabh Bachchan – Piku as Bhashkor Banerjee ‡
  - Ranbir Kapoor – Tamasha as Ved Vardhan Sahni ‡
  - Salman Khan – Bajrangi Bhaijaan as Pawan Kumar Chaturvedi "Bajrangi" ‡
  - Varun Dhawan – Badlapur as Raghav "Raghu" Pratap Singh ‡
- 2017 Shahid Kapoor – Udta Punjab as Tommy Singh ‡
  - Amitabh Bachchan – Pink as Deepak Sehgal ‡
  - Ranbir Kapoor – Ae Dil Hai Mushkil as Ayan Sanger ‡
  - Salman Khan – Sultan as Sultan Ali Khan ‡
  - Shah Rukh Khan – Fan as Gaurav / Aryan Khanna ‡
  - Sushant Singh Rajput – M.S. Dhoni: The Untold Story as M.S. Dhoni ‡
- 2018 Irrfan Khan – Hindi Medium as Raj Batra †
  - Adil Hussain – Mukti Bhawan as Rajiv
  - Akshay Kumar – Toilet: Ek Prem Katha as Keshav Sharma ‡
  - Rajkummar Rao – Newton as Nutan "Newton" Kumar
  - Ranbir Kapoor – Jagga Jasoos as Jagga
- 2019 Ranveer Singh – Padmaavat as Alauddin Khilji ‡
  - Ayushmann Khurrana – Andhadhun as Akash ‡
  - Rajkummar Rao – Stree as Vicky ‡
  - Ranbir Kapoor – Sanju as Sanjay Dutt †
  - Vicky Kaushal – Raazi as Iqbal Syed

=== 2020s ===
- 2020 Shahid Kapoor — Kabir Singh as Kabir Singh ‡
  - Ayushmann Khurrana — Article 15 as Ayan Ranjan
  - Hrithik Roshan — Super 30 as Anand Kumar ‡
  - Ranveer Singh — Gully Boy as Murad Ahmed †
  - Vicky Kaushal — Uri: The Surgical Strike as Vihaan Singh Shergill ‡
- 2022 Vicky Kaushal – Sardar Udham as Udham Singh ‡
  - Irrfan Khan – Angrezi Medium as Champak Ghasiteram Bansal
  - Manoj Bajpayee – Bhonsle as Ganpath Bhonsle
  - Ranveer Singh – 83 as Kapil Dev †
  - Siddharth Malhotra – Shershaah as Captain Vikram Batra ‡
- 2023 Hrithik Roshan – Vikram Vedha as Vedha Betal ‡
  - Abhishek Bachchan – Dasvi as Chief Minister Ganga Ram Chaudhary
  - Ajay Devgn – Drishyam 2 as Vijay Salgaonkar ‡
  - Anupam Kher – The Kashmir Files as Pushkar Nath Pandit ‡
  - Kartik Aaryan – Bhool Bhulaiyaa 2 as Ruhaan Randhawa a.k.a. Rooh Baba ‡
  - Rajkummar Rao – Monica, O My Darling as Jayant "Jay" Arkhedkar a.k.a. Johnn
- 2024 Shah Rukh Khan – Jawan as Captain Vikram Rathore / Azad ‡
  - Ranbir Kapoor – Animal as Ranvijay Singh Balbir "Vijay" / Aziz Haque †
  - Ranveer Singh – Rocky Aur Rani Kii Prem Kahaani as Rocky Randhawa ‡
  - Sunny Deol – Gadar 2 as Tara Singh ‡
  - Vicky Kaushal – Sam Bahadur as Sam Manekshaw ‡
  - Vikrant Massey – 12th Fail as Manoj Kumar Sharma
- 2025 Kartik Aaryan – Bhool Bhulaiyaa 3 as Ruhan/Rooh Baba & Rajkumar Debendranath
  - Abhishek Bachchan – I Want to Talk as Arjun Sen
  - Ajay Devgn – Maidaan as Syed Abdul Rahim "Rahim Sahab"
  - Rajkummar Rao – Srikanth as Srikanth Bolla
  - Sparsh Shrivastava – Laapataa Ladies as Deepak Kumar

== See also ==
- IIFA Awards
- Bollywood
- Cinema of India
