= Krrish (franchise) =

Film franchise

- Series logo
- Created by: Rakesh Roshan
- Original work: Koi... Mil Gaya
- Owner: FilmKraft Productions
- Years: 2003–present

Print publications
- Comics: Krrish: Menace of the Monkey Men

Films and television
- Film(s): Koi... Mil Gaya; Krrish; Krrish 3
- Television series: J Bole Toh Jadoo
- Television film(s): Kid Krrish; Kid Krrish: Mission Bhutan; Kid Krrish: Mystery in Mongolia; Kid Krrish: Shakalaka Africa

Games
- Video game(s): Krrish: The Game; Krrish 3

Audio
- Soundtrack(s): Koi Mil Gaya; Krrish; Krrish 3

Miscellaneous
- Budget: ₹165 crore (3 films)
- Box office: ₹602.25 crore (3 films)

Krrish is an Indian Hindi-language media franchise of superhero action thriller films, television series, comics and video games. The film series is directed, produced and written by Rakesh Roshan. Krrish is considered Indian cinema's first such film series. All three films star Rakesh's son Hrithik. The films are centred, initially, on a mentally disabled boy who has an encounter with an extraterrestrial being, and later, his son, who grows up to be a reluctant superhero Krrish.

In 2013, an animated television series based on this Krrish film series, and named Kid Krrish, aired on Cartoon Network India. It also spawned a spin-off animated/live-action series titled J Bole Toh Jadoo that aired on Nickelodeon (India). Krrish is the tenth highest-grossing film series in India.

== Theatrical films ==
The film series covers the story of three generations of the Mehra family. It first begins with Dr. Sanjay Mehra (Rakesh Roshan) and his wife Sonia (Rekha) who are part of a car crash. Dr. Mehra has died while Sonia, who is pregnant, survives with injuries. This results in their son, Rohit Mehra (Hrithik Roshan), being born developmentally disabled. After receiving supernatural abilities from an alien he befriends, Rohit marries his best friend Nisha (Preity Zinta) by the end of the first film. Their son, Krishna Mehra (also Hrithik Roshan) is born with the same supernatural powers in the second film (Krrish) which he uses to help people, eventually turning into the superhero 'Krrish'. He is later romantically involved with city girl Priya (Priyanka Chopra). By the end of the second film, the characters Sonia, Rohit, Krishna, and Priya are the only members of the family that are still alive while Nisha died a few days after Krishna's birth. The third film shows the entry of Kaal (Vivek Oberoi) who was created by Dr. Siddharth Arya (Naseeruddin Shah) during an experiment on Rohit thus being Rohit's second son and the main antagonist of the film. Kaal apparently kills Krrish but he is saved by Rohit who dies while giving life to the dead Krrish through his solar experiment. Krishna finally kills Kaal and by the end of the third film, Krishna, Priya and their son, Rohit (named after his grandfather Rohit Mehra) are alive while Sonia died somewhere between the events of Krrish and Krrish 3 and Krrish 4.

=== Koi... Mil Gaya (2003) ===
Scientist Doctor Sanjay Mehra (Rakesh Roshan) creates a computer program from which he calls for extraterrestrial life. When he believes he has finally gotten a response, the scientific community mocks him. While driving home, an alien spacecraft appears overhead. Sanjay veers off the road and dies, but his pregnant wife Sonia (Rekha) survives and gives birth to their son Rohit (Hrithik Roshan), who is developmentally disabled as a result of the crash.

An older Rohit befriends a young woman named Nisha (Preity Zinta) and they find Sanjay's computer and summon the aliens by accident. The visiting aliens leave in haste, leaving one behind by accident. Rohit, Nisha and Rohit's friends find and befriend the alien, naming him Jadoo ("Magic") and discover his psychokinesis abilities. Jadoo discovers that Rohit is mentally abnormal and uses his powers to enhance the boy's mind. Rohit finds himself accepted by most of his peers. A bully, Raj, and his friends attempt to embarrass Rohit multiple times, only to be beaten in fights as well as in sport since Rohit's physical strength and agility are increased along with his mental abilities to the peak of human potential.

Eventually, the government gets suspicious of Rohit and suspects him of hiding Jadoo. A group of policemen manages to knock Rohit out and capture Jadoo, preparing to take him to America for testing. However, Rohit wakes up and summons the aliens to return for Jadoo. Using his enhanced abilities, Rohit arrives in time to rescue Jadoo and manages to send him in his species spaceship. As he leaves, Jadoo takes Rohit's powers and Rohit is mentally disabled again. However, this saves him from prosecution by the government and after everything dies down, Jadoo silently returns Rohit's new abilities permanently. Rohit and Nisha lead a happy life together from then on.

=== Krrish (2006) ===
Five-year-old orphan Krishna Mehra is undergoing an intelligence quotient test by his professors, who suspect he has high IQ and physical abilities. His grandmother Sonia (Rekha) takes the young Krishna to a remote mountain village in northern India to conceal his unique abilities. Years later, Krishna (Hrithik Roshan) meets Priya (Priyanka Chopra) when she vacations in the country. Krishna and Priya grow close just before she departs for her home in Singapore.

To appease her boss, Priya calls Krishna to join her in Singapore, where she tries to get him to perform heroic acts. Krishna does not, as he had promised his grandmother that he would hide his abilities. Krishna learns that his father Rohit was hired to help design a machine to see the future by Dr. Siddhant Arya (Naseeruddin Shah). He further learned that Rohit had been killed by Dr. Siddhant when he tried to destroy the machine, after learning of Siddhant's evil intentions. This caused his mother, Nisha (Preity Zinta), to die of a broken heart.

Krishna later goes to a circus where an explosion occurs. He puts on a mask to hide his identity in order to save some trapped children, after which he is given the identity of superhero Krrish. Vikram Sinha (Sharat Saxena), who has been searching for Krishna for years, informs Krishna that his father Rohit is alive and Dr. Siddhant has been holding him captive. Krishna follows Siddhant to his island lair, where a huge fight ensues between Krrish and the doctor's thugs. Krrish eventually defeats them and saves Priya and Rohit. In the final scene, Krrish mortally wounds Siddhant. Before he dies, Siddhant asks Krrish who he is, and Krishna reveals himself. After revealing to Rohit that he is his son, Krishna takes Priya and Rohit back to India, reuniting him with Sonia. Rohit finds out his wife, Nisha, died after he disappeared. He mourns her, together with his son and mother, but still thanks Jadoo (who is somewhere between the stars) for giving his family this gift.

=== Krrish 3 (2013) ===
Rohit Mehra (Hrithik Roshan), who is a professional scientist now, is living a happy life in Mumbai along with his son Krishna (Hrithik Roshan) who is now married to Priya (Priyanka Chopra). While working in the laboratory, Rohit invents a device to bring back the life of dead tissue using solar energy through reflections but failed to complete it because of the high intensity of sun rays. Priya works as a journalist for Aaj Tak whereas Krishna is struggling hard to keep a steady job while helping the city with his superpowers as the superhero 'Krrish'.

Somewhere in an isolated area, the owner of Kaal laboratories, Kaal (Vivek Oberoi), who has extraordinary telepathic powers, is completely handicapped with his body except his brain and two fingers. He has been creating powerful human-animal mutants (or Maanvars he calls them) using his DNA, particularly the ruthless chameleon mutant Kaya (Kangana Ranaut) who can assume any form she wants. Kaal has been trying hard to cure himself but has been unsuccessful thus far. He dreams of making billions by first creating dangerous viruses using his DNA, spreading them in densely populated areas and then selling his own antidotes.

Kaal chooses India as his next target and with Kaya and other mutants' help, he spreads his newly created virus in Mumbai which creates havoc among the city. Rohit, Krishna, and Priya remain unaffected by the virus. Rohit manages to create an antidote using Krishna's blood and Krishna spreads it throughout the city via explosions for quick effect. For this, Kaal's mutants attack and thrash Rohit's laboratory but Rohit and Priya are saved by Krrish. Priya is injured and hospitalized while one of the mutants is also injured which is kept in scientific custody by Rohit and his team. To find out how an antidote was developed without using his own blood, Kaal kidnaps Priya who is pregnant with Krishna's child and Kaya takes Priya's form. Rohit and Krishna are informed that Priya has lost her child. Afterward, Kaya starts living as Priya with Krishna and seeks for the antidote formula. Rohit departs to Singapore to explore some answers after he finds out that the virus has a link with his own DNA and Kaal laboratories as well. Meanwhile, Kaya develops an attraction towards Krishna but he soon discovers her true identity and reveals himself as Krrish to her. Kaya decides to help Krishna and discloses that Priya and her child are still safe in Kaal's hideout.

In Singapore, Rohit is kidnapped by Kaal's men. Rohit unveils to Kaal that he was kidnapped by Dr. Siddhant Arya (Naseeruddin Shah) who tried to create a synonymous avatar of the former but got only a disabled child and donated him into an orphanage where the boy was adopted by a wealthy family, who eventually grows up to become Kaal. Kaal cures himself by using Rohit's body serum. Krishna saves Priya after killing the mutants and finally reaches the correct hideout with Kaya's help where Kaal kills both of them. Kaal then surrounds himself completely into a steel body due to his powerful magnetic powers and departs to Mumbai in search of Priya meanwhile causing destruction to the city.

Angered by Krishna's death, Rohit decides to bring Krrish back to life by using the device invented by him but sacrifices himself to absorb the high intensity of sunlight. Krrish, now thrice as powerful as before, comes after him and saves Priya. Krrish, unable to crush Kaal after brutally fighting with him, concludes that the latter could be demolished by melting his steel body. He quickly adjusts the mirrors for reflection and points Rohit's device towards Kaal whose steel body melts finally. The film ends with Priya delivering a baby which also shows signs of extraordinary power.

=== Krrish 4 ===
Rakesh Roshan has revealed that he will soon start working for Krrish 4 as he feels that the public wants it. "I will start working on the sequel soon. Due to public demand, we may include some sidekick characters as well," said Rakesh Roshan while celebrating the success of Krrish 3, "I'm currently not working on a film outside the Krrish franchise with Hrithik Roshan, but I will do a film in the future. I would love to direct him in a fresh script as soon as I'm relieved with this franchise," Rakesh Roshan explained. He was accompanied by Hrithik Roshan at this event in Tamil Nadu on Monday, 12 November. Hrithik Roshan spoke about how he felt playing a superhero. "Being a superhero is like playing any one of us because we all have it inside us. It has been a great journey for me and I learned a lot by playing the character."

In September 2016, Rakesh Roshan announced the fourth installment of the franchise. Rakesh Roshan said, “When my wife showed me a tweet with Bappa’s (Lord Ganesha) picture as Krrish, it reaffirmed my belief that Krrish is the original superhero we have. It boosted my confidence and inspired me to make the fourth installment.” The movie was supposed to be released during Christmas 2020, but the production got delayed due to the COVID-19 pandemic. As of 2024, it is still in production. Hrithik also tweeted about the film, sharing a photograph of Lord Ganesha dressed as Krrish.

In September 2017, it was reported that Hrithik Roshan would portray both the protagonist and the antagonist by playing a dual role. Priyanka Chopra will also reprise her character of Priya Mehra in the film, as confirmed by Rakesh Roshan.

On the completion of 15 years of Krrish, Hrithik Roshan teased Krrish 4 via his social media handles on June 23, 2021.

In March 2025, Rakesh Roshan announced that his son, Hrithik Roshan, would be making his directorial debut with Krrish 4. The film is expected to begin shooting early next year after Hrithik completes War 2.

In September 2025, Rakesh Roshan announced that with the budget and story being locked, pre-production would begin by early 2026 and filming by mid-2026, aiming it for 2027 release.

In June 2026, Rakesh Roshan noted filming would likely commence at the end of 2026.

== Television series ==
In 2004, owing to the popularity of Koi... Mil Gaya, an animation-cum-live-action spinoff series built around the popular alien character Jadoo from the film, called J Bole to Jadoo was launched on Nickelodeon (India). It was one of the first 3D live action animation shows to be made in India.

The show focuses on Jadoo as a central character and his interplanetary adventures when he enters the lives of two kids on Earth, Nina and Chakki. Also on the show are Jadoo's friends Tona, Half-Time and Ki2 from his home planet Tarkopar. The show sketches Tarkopar as a colorful fantasy-land with rhythmic, organic and spiral structures and landscapes.

== Television films ==
Cartoon Network launched Kid Krrish which is an Indian animated movies series created by Filmkraft Productions which partnered with Trivandrum based Toonz Animation India and Cartoon Network Asia. It is targeted at ages 8–12. The first of the 4 movies Kid Krrish aired on 2 October 2013 on Cartoon Network India channel. The run-time is about an hour and it aired in 4 languages - English, Hindi, Tamil and Telugu.

Cartoon Network India aired the second movie in the Kid Krrish franchise, Kid Krrish: Mission Bhutan on 19 July 2014. The third movie, Kid Krrish: Mystery in Mongolia, was aired on 7 September 2014. And the fourth movie Kid Krrish: Shakalaka Africa was telecast on 25 April 2015.

== Comics ==
=== Krrish: Menace of the Monkey Men ===
This was released as a comic book magazine available in stores in 2013 and also converted into an animated mobile comic to be released as weekly chapters through an exclusive Krrish Comics App, which will be launched by Hungama Digital, Filmkraft Productions (I) Pvt. Ltd digital partner for Krrish 3. Carving Dreams was responsible for securing the deal between Filmkraft Productions (I) Pvt. Ltd, Graphic India and Hungama Digital.

Superstar actor and Krrish star Hrithik Roshan commented, “As we get ready for Krrish 3, I am pleased to announce this bonus never before seen Krrish story from Graphic India, the leader in Comics for India, and Hungama, the first name in digital mobile. We’re working with an international team of comic book superstars so you can experience Krrish in a whole new way.” “Rakesh and Hrithik Roshan have created a hero that has captured the imaginations of millions across India. We are thrilled to be partnering with Filmkraft Productions (I) Pvt. Ltd and Hungama to continue the exploits of Krrish, in the natural extension of comic books, which is a perfect fit for any superhero.” Graphic India co-founder and CEO Sharad Devarajan added, “Through digital comics Krrish can now fly straight from the big screen and into the small screen of mobile devices, reaching his millions of fans.” The comic is written by Tom DeFalco, illustrated by Sal Buscema, and animated by Ashish Avin and Dhanashekhar Mudaliar.

== Games ==
=== Krrish: The Game ===
A Krrish game was made in 2006 by Indiagames after the release of Krrish.

=== Krrish 3 ===
An official Krrish 3 game was launched for Windows smartphones, tablets and PCs. The game was developed by Hungama Digital Media Entertainment and Gameshastra.

== List of characters ==
=== Dr. Sanjay Mehra ===
A scientist who invents a computer to summon aliens to Earth. He is the husband of Sonia, father of Rohit, father-in-law of Nisha, grandfather of Krishna, grandfather-in-law of Priya.

=== Sonia Mehra ===
Wife of Sanjay Mehra, mother of Rohit, mother-in-law of Nisha, grandmother of Krishna, grandmother-in-law of Priya.

=== Dr. Rohit Mehra ===
A disabled boy who meets an alien that gives him special abilities. He is the main protagonist in Koi Mil Gaya. In Krrish 3, he becomes a professional scientist working in a government organization. He is the son of Sanjay and Sonia, husband of Nisha, father of Krishna, father-in-law of Priya.

=== Nisha Mehra ===
Wife of Rohit Mehra, daughter-in-law of Sanjay Mehra and Sonia Mehra, mother of Krishna Mehra, mother-in-law of Priya Mehra.

=== Jadoo ===
The alien who is accidentally left on Earth for a while and befriends Rohit. He was the second protagonist of the first edition named Koi.. mil gaya. He played a major role as he gave Rohit special abilities. He also gave his own superpowers to Rohit. Afterward, Rohit became a famous scientist.

=== Krishna Mehra / "Krrish" ===
The son of Rohit Mehra and Nisha Mehra, grandson of Sanjay Mehra and Sonia Mehra, husband of Priya Mehra. He inherited special abilities from his father and was taken to a remote village as a child by his grandmother to hide his growing powers. He eventually becomes the superhero Krrish, using powers of superintelligence and learning to quickly adopt new skills.

=== Priya Mehra ===
Wife of Krishna Mehra, daughter-in-law of Rohit Mehra and Nisha Mehra, granddaughter-in-law of Sanjay Mehra and Sonia Mehra.

=== Raj Saxena ===
The villain of Koi... Mil Gaya. He loves Nisha, and understanding that Nisha loves Rohit, he constantly tries to humiliate him.

=== Inspector Khurshid Khan ===
Police inspector who tries to capture Jadoo in Koi... Mil Gaya.

=== Dr. Siddhant Arya ===
The villain of Krrish, who wants to use a future-seeing computer to rule the world.

=== Kaal ===
The villain of Krrish 3. A handicapped evil genius who exhibits telekinetic powers, he is the founder of Kaal Laboratory and the creator of Maanvars, a team of mutants made by fusing the serum of humans and animals. He is Rohit's long-lost second son who was born through Dr. Arya's experiment.

=== Kaya ===
Kaal's female henchman in Krrish 3, who is created by fusing the serum of a woman and a chameleon. She is instrumental in Kaal's scheme because of her ability to shapeshift into anybody whenever she wishes. She later falls in love with Krishna after shape-shifting into Priya.

=== Dr. Varun Shetty ===
Rohit's scientist friend. He is a nuclear scientist as seen in Krrish 3.

=== Dr. Alok Sen ===
A scientist seen in Krrish 3 working at Kaal Laboratories. He tries to help with the antidote but gets killed in the process.

=== Striker|Frogman ===
A mutant created by Kaal through an experiment. Striker uses his tongue to kill the enemy. He is a derivative of a human and a frog and his tongue is his sharpest weapon. He is mischievous and that is indicated by his envious green eyes.

=== Rhino Man ===
A mutant created by Kaal through an experiment. A fusion of a human and a rhinoceros, he uses the deadly sharp horn on his head to kill his prey. His body is as heavy as that of a rhino and he uses his size to his advantage when fighting with the enemy.

=== Ant Man ===
A mutant ant human hybrid, Ant Man possesses the strength to lift objects up to 100 times his body weight. His character and personality betray the animal within.

=== Cheetah Woman ===
A mutant created by Kaal through an experiment. Half-human, half-cheetah, she is a deadly combination of speed and sharp claws. No human can match her in speed, and she teleports like a ghost. Feral yellow eyes indicate a voracious hunter and nothing escapes her eyes.

=== Scorpion Woman ===
A mutant created by Kaal through an experiment. Part-human, part-scorpion, she has claws as hands and a poisonous sting at the end of her long plait, with which she strikes. She shows her targets no mercy and can kill them in one stroke.

== Cast and characters ==
Character	Film				TV series		Digital Comic
Character	Koi... Mil Gaya (2003)	Krrish (2006)	Krrish 3 (2013)	Krrish 4 (2027)	J Bole Toh Jadoo (2004–2005)	Kid Krrish (2013–2016)	Krrish: Menace of the Monkey Men (2013)
Rohit Mehra	Hrithik Roshan	Hrithik Roshan	Hrithik Roshan	Hrithik Roshan	Hrithik Roshan (photo)	Animated (flashbacks)	Animated (voiced by Sumedh Shinde)
Krishna Mehra Krrish		Hrithik Roshan	Hrithik Roshan	Hrithik Roshan		Animated (voiced by Pooja Punjabi)	Animated (voiced by Sumedh Shinde)
Priya Mehra		Priyanka Chopra	Priyanka Chopra	TBA			Animated (voiced by Priya Raina)
Sonia Mehra	Rekha	Rekha	Rekha (photo, archived footage)	TBA	Rekha (photo)	Animated (voiced by Snigdha Maheshwari)	Animated (voiced by Urmila Chatterjee)
Nisha Malhotra	Preity Zinta	Preity Zinta (flashback cameo)	Preity Zinta (photo, archived footage)	TBA	Preity Zinta (photo)	Animated (flashback cameo)	
Jadoo	Indravadan Purohit (under the mask)	Indravadan Purohit (under the mask, archived footage)	Indravadan Purohit (under the mask, archived footage)	TBA	Animated (voiced by Saptrishi Ghosh)	Animated (voiced by Vaibhav Thakkar)	
Sanjay Mehra	Rakesh Roshan	Rakesh Roshan (archived footage)	Rakesh Roshan (archived footage)				
Rohit's friends Pandavas	Anuj Pandit, Mohit Makkad, Jai Choksi, Omkar Purohit, Hansika Motwani, Pranita Bishnoi				Anuj Pandit, Mohit Makkad, Jai Choksi, Omkar Purohit (photo)	Animated (flashback cameo)	
Father Rodericks	Akash Khurana	Akash Khurana					
Dr. Siddhant Arya	Naseeruddin Shah	Naseeruddin Shah (flashback cameo)			Animated (flashback cameo)		

== Reception ==
Box office performance

Film	Release date	Budget	Box office revenue (est.)			Ref
Film	Release date	Budget	India (net)	Outside India	Worldwide (gross)	Ref
Koi... Mil Gaya	8 August 2003	₹30 crore ($6.4 million)	₹47.19 crore	$2.15 million	₹108.58 crore ($23 million)	
Krrish	23 June 2006	₹45 crore ($10 million)	₹72.15 crore	$4.32 million	₹126.56 crore ($28 million)	
Krrish 3	1 November 2013	₹95 crore ($21 million)	₹244 crore	$8.5 million	₹393 crore ($50 million)	
Total		₹170 crore ($37.4 million)	₹363.34 crore	$15.3 million	₹628.66 crore ($101 million)	

Critical reception

Film	Rotten Tomatoes		
Film	Rotten Tomatoes	Koi... Mil Gaya	80% (5.4/10 average rating) (10 reviews)
Krrish	88% (7/10 average rating) (8 reviews)		
Krrish 3	71% (5.8/10 average rating) (17 reviews)		

== See also ==
- Science fiction films in India
- List of highest-grossing Bollywood films
- List of highest-grossing Indian films worldwide
- Bollywood 100 Crore Club
- List of most expensive non-English-language films
