= Koi... Mil Gaya (soundtrack) =

Koi... Mil Gaya (Original Motion Picture Soundtrack)

Soundtrack album by Rajesh Roshan
- Released: 31 May 2003
- Recorded: 2002–2003
- Genre: Feature film soundtrack
- Length: 47:54
- Language: Hindi
- Label: Saregama
- Producer: Rajesh Roshan

Rajesh Roshan chronology
Love at Times Square (2003)	Koi... Mil Gaya (Original Motion Picture Soundtrack) (2003)	Aetbaar (2004)

Koi... Mil Gaya (Original Motion Picture Soundtrack) is the soundtrack to the 2003 film of the same name directed by Rakesh Roshan and stars Hrithik Roshan and Preity Zinta in the lead roles. The film's score and soundtrack are composed by Rakesh's brother Rajesh Roshan and featured eight tracks written by Ibrahim Ashk, Nasir Faraaz and Dev Kohli. Udit Narayan, K. S. Chithra, Alka Yagnik, Tarsame Singh Saini, Shaan, Kavita Krishnamurti, Baby Sneha, Adnan Sami, and Preeti Uttam Singh performed the vocals for the songs. The soundtrack was released under the Saregama label on 31 May 2003.

== Background ==
According to Rajesh, Koi... Mil Gaya was more difficult to compose for in comparison to his other films as it came after the success of Kaho Naa...Pyar Hai (2000) increasing the expectations from the audience. Rajesh had persuaded consciously on doing something different than usual, a technique that he previously employed in Kaho Naa...Pyar Hai. Rakesh would assist him on composing the score, that stood true to his ideas. He intended on scoring fast-paced tunes for the film, but Rakesh told him to redo it so that it would be less conventional. The album was sold for ₹50 million (US$520,000) to Saregama who released it on 28 May 2003.

== Reception ==
Critical response to the album was positive. Joginder Tuteja of Bollywood Hungama concluded, "In all, the music ... doesn't disappoint. Though we may not be able to compare its music with the earlier Kaho Naa... Pyaar Hai by the same team, it has its share of plus points going in its favour." Planet Bollywood's Anish Khanna declared "Jaadoo Jaadoo" as the best song from the soundtrack album. In a less-positive review, Narendra Kusnur from Mid-Day opined that it "loses out on consistency". The Hindu concluded the title song was "the unique selling point" of the film, referring to it as a "sonorous number", praising Chithra's singing. The critic added, "The lyrics of all the songs are simple and easily understandable. Rajesh Roshan is able to impart a certain freshness to the music."

Although Anupama Chopra claimed that the sales of the soundtrack would fall short of 1 million copies due to piracy, the film-trade website Box Office India, reported that the soundtrack album sold 2.1 million copies becoming the fourth-highest-selling Bollywood soundtrack of the year.

== Track listing ==
Koi... Mil Gaya (Original Motion Picture Soundtrack) track listing
No.	Title	Lyrics	Singer(s)	Length
1.	"Koi Mil Gaya"	Ibrahim Ashk	Udit Narayan, K. S. Chithra	7:14
2.	"Idhar Chala Mein Udhar Chala"	Ibrahim Ashk	Udit Narayan, Alka Yagnik	6:07
3.	"Jaadoo Jaadoo" (Part 1)	Ibrahim Ashk	Udit Narayan, Alka Yagnik	5:55
4.	"Instrumental Theme"	—	Preeti Uttam Singh	4:32
5.	"It's Magic"	Ibrahim Ashk	Tarsame Singh Saini	5:50
6.	"In Panchiyon Ko Dekh Kar"	Nasir Faraaz	Shaan, Kavita Krishnamurti, Baby Sneha	6:33
7.	"Jaadoo Jaadoo" (Part 2)	Ibrahim Ashk	Adnan Sami, Alka Yagnik	5:55
8.	"Haila Haila"	Dev Kohli	Udit Narayan, Alka Yagnik	5:48
Total length:				47:54

== Awards and nominations ==
Accolades for Koi... Mil Gaya (Original Motion Picture Soundtrack)
Award	Date of ceremony (Note: Date is linked to the article about the awards held that year, wherever possible.)	Category	Recipient(s) and nominee(s)	Result	Ref(s)
Bollywood Movie Awards	1 May 2004	Best Playback Singer – Female	K. S. Chithra (for "Koi Mil Gaya")	Won	
Filmfare Awards	21 February 2004	Best Music Director	Rajesh Roshan	Nominated	
Filmfare Awards	21 February 2004	Best Male Playback Singer	Udit Narayan (for "Idhar Chala Mein")	Nominated	
Filmfare Awards	21 February 2004	Best Female Playback Singer	K. S. Chithra (for "Koi Mil Gaya")	Nominated	
International Indian Film Academy Awards	20 May 2004	Best Music Director	Rajesh Roshan	Nominated	
International Indian Film Academy Awards	20 May 2004	Best Male Playback Singer	Udit Narayan (for "Koi Mil Gaya")	Nominated	
International Indian Film Academy Awards	20 May 2004	Best Song Recording	Satish Gupta	Won	
Producers Guild Film Awards	29 May 2004	Best Male Playback Singer	Udit Narayan (for "Idhar Chala Mein")	Nominated	
Producers Guild Film Awards	29 May 2004	Best Female Playback Singer	K. S. Chithra (for "Koi Mil Gaya")	Nominated	
Producers Guild Film Awards	29 May 2004	Best Music Director	Rajesh Roshan	Nominated	
Producers Guild Film Awards	29 May 2004	Best Lyricist	Ibrahim Ashk (for "Koi Mil Gaya")	Nominated	
Screen Awards	17 January 2004	Best Background Music	Rajesh Roshan	Nominated	
Screen Awards	17 January 2004	Best Music Director	Rajesh Roshan	Nominated	
Zee Cine Awards	26 February 2004	Best Music Director	Rajesh Roshan	Nominated	
