= Chotoonz TV =

YouTube-based children's channel

YouTube information
- Channel: ChotoonzTV
- Years active: 2013–present
- Genres: Comedy; Slapstick
- Subscribers: 11.10 million
- Views: 7 billion
- Last updated: 16 May 2025
- Website: chotoonz.tv

Chotoonz TV is a children's animation channel on YouTube and other digital platforms. Chotoonz TV predominantly features compilations encompassing chase comedy cartoons such as Pakdam Pakdai (Rat-a-Tat) and Bunty Aur Billy (Cat & Keet). Other content on the channel include The Magical Toothfairies, Chai Chai, The Adventures of Tenali Raman, and the Kid Krrish film series. The channel is owned by Toonz Animation, and was incorporated on October 30, 2013. As in March 2018, the channel has 2.2 million subscribers and 1.75 Billion views. Most modern Chotoonz videos and compilations include "bumpers" featuring the characters from the compilation they're being featured in, usually the main cast from Pakdam Pakdai or Bunty Aur Billy. These sequences often feature surreal, absurd, and occasionally obscure material, whether it be a parody of a popular franchise (like the Avengers), or a strange occurrence happening to the characters. Videos from Chotoonz also occasionally feature censorship of some scenes considered abnormally "violent".

Other channels operated by Toonz include Popcorn Toonz (a movie channel), Baby Toonz, BAAM Superheroes, Smighties, Chotoonz Wondergirl, Chotoonz Turkish and Chotoonz Spanish.

== Platforms ==
Chotoonz TV is available on YouTube, Roku, Dailymotion, Amazon Prime and ReachmeTV.

== Awards ==
Chotoonz TV has received two YouTube Play Button awards. It has received a YouTube Golden Play Button award for crossing 1 million subscribers in 2017, and a YouTube Silver Play Button award for crossing 100,000 subscribers in 2016.
