= Krrish 3 (soundtrack) =

Soundtrack album by Rajesh Roshan
- Released: 19 September 2013
- Recorded: 2012–2013
- Genre: Feature film soundtrack
- Length: 37:10
- Label: T-Series
- Producer: Rajesh Roshan

Rajesh Roshan chronology
Kites (2010)	Krrish 3 (2013)	Kaabil (2017)

Singles from Krrish 3
- 1. "Raghupati Raghav" Released: 13 September 2013

Krrish 3 is the soundtrack album to the 2013 film of the same name directed by Rakesh Roshan, which served as the third instalment of the Krrish franchise and a sequel to Krrish (2006), starring Hrithik Roshan, Kangana Ranaut, Vivek Oberoi and Priyanka Chopra. The film's music is composed by Rajesh Roshan, while the background score is composed by Salim–Sulaiman. The film's soundtrack featured five original songs and two remixes, accompanying seven tracks under the lyrics of Sameer, while Annamalai and Rajshri Sudhakar, respectively wrote lyrics for the dubbed versions.

The album was preceded by the single "Raghupati Raghav" which released on 13 September 2013. It was distributed by T-Series and released on 19 September, to mixed reviews from critics, with criticism directed towards the composition and lyrics.

== Release ==
Krrish 3's soundtrack was preceded by the first single "Raghupati Raghav". A 15-second teaser of the song was released on 11 September 2013 and was viewed by 400,000 times within 24 hours of its release. The video song was released through online platforms on 12 September, while the song itself was released as a digital single on iTunes, the following day. Upon release, it was compared to "You Are My Soniya" from Kabhi Khushi Kabhie Gham (2001).

The music rights of the film were acquired by T-Series for ₹6 crore (equivalent to ₹10 crore or US$1.2 million in 2023). The film's soundtrack was launched at the office of Filmkraft Productions on 27 September 2013 with Hrithik, Ranaut and Oberoi in attendance with the film's producers.

== Track listing ==
=== Hindi ===
All lyrics are written by Sameer.

No.	Title	Singer(s)	Length
1.	"Krrish Krrish"	Mamta Sharma, Anirudh Bhola, Rajesh Roshan	5:13
2.	"Raghupati Raghav"	Neeraj Shridhar, Monali Thakur, Bob	5:21
3.	"Dil Tu Hi Bataa"	Alisha Chinai, Zubeen Garg	6:41
4.	"You Are My Love"	Mohit Chauhan, Alisha Chinai	4:31
5.	"God Allah Aur Bhagwan"	Sonu Nigam, Shreya Ghoshal	6:28
6.	"Dil Tu Hi Bataa" (Remix By DJ Shiva)	Alisha Chinai, Zubeen Garg	4:25
7.	"Raghupati Raghav" (Remix By DJ Shiva)	Neeraj Shridhar, Monali Thakur, Bob	4:31
Total length:			37:10

=== Tamil ===
All lyrics are written by Annamalai.

No.	Title	Singer(s)	Length
1.	"Krrish Krrish"	Priya Himesh	5:13
2.	"Raghupati Raghav"	Rahul Nambiar, Rita Thyagarajan	5:21
3.	"En Uyir Paravai"	Suchith Suresan, Rita Thyagarajan	6:41
4.	"You Are My Love"	Ranjith, Priya Himesh	4:31
5.	"God Allah Nam Bhagwan"	Rahul Nambiar, Shweta Mohan	6:28
6.	"En Uyir Paravai" (Remix By DJ Shiva)	Suchith Suresan, Rita Thyagarajan	4:25
7.	"Raghupati Raghav" (Remix By DJ Shiva)	Rahul Nambiar, Rita Thyagarajan	4:31
Total length:			37:10

=== Telugu ===
All lyrics are written by Rajshri Sudhakar.

No.	Title	Singer(s)	Length
1.	"Krrish Krrish"	Priya Himesh	5:13
2.	"Raghupati Raghav"	Rahul Nambiar, Rita Thyagarajan	5:21
3.	"En Uyir Paravai"	Suchith Suresan, Rita Thyagarajan	6:41
4.	"You Are My Love"	Ranjith, Priya Himesh	4:31
5.	"God Allah Nam Bhagwan"	Rahul Nambiar, Shweta Mohan	6:28
6.	"En Uyir Paravai" (Remix By DJ Shiva)	Suchith Suresan, Rita Thyagarajan	4:25
7.	"Raghupati Raghav" (Remix By DJ Shiva)	Rahul Nambiar, Rita Thyagarajan	4:31
Total length:			37:10

== Reception ==
The album received mostly mixed reviews from critics. Critic based at Indo-Asian News Service stated that "the music of Krrish 3 is not superb, but it entertains". Joginder Tuteja of Rediff.com rated two-and-a-half out of five, summarizing "As stated in the beginning, the Krrish 3 soundtrack had to be nothing short of magnificent. But it doesn't come anywhere close to that. Though a couple of chartbuster songs would have elevated the musical aspects of the film, an absence of that won't make any difference to the movie watching experience since Krrish 3 as a brand would be enough to sustain and enhance audience interest in what unfolds on screen."

Bryan Durham of The Times of India wrote "Rajesh Roshan soundtracks have, over the years, held constant spots on my personal playlists. It, therefore, comes as something of a disappointment to listen to his latest effort. Krrish 3 doesn't quite hold its own against other worthy contemporaries" and called it as a "complete letdown". Karthik Srinivasan of Milliblog summarized "Krrish 3 is the soundtrack equivalent of LOL".
