= You Tell Me =

You Tell Me may also refer to:

- "You Tell Me" (Paul McCartney song), 2007
- "You Tell Me" (Johnny Cash song), 1959
- You Tell Me (album), a 2019 album by David Brewis and Sarah Hayes
- "You Tell Me", a song by Terri Clark from the 2009 album The Long Way Home
- "You Tell Me", a song by Tom Petty and the Heartbreakers from the 1979 album Damn the Torpedoes
- "Dil Tu Hi Bataa" (lit. 'Heart You Tell Me'), a song by Rajesh Roshan, Alisha Chinai and Zubeen Garg from the 2013 Indian film Krrish 3
