= J Bole Toh Jadoo =

Indian animated television series

- Based on: Koi... Mil Gaya by Rakesh Roshan
- Written by: Faizal Akhtar
- Directed by: Tilak Shetty
- Starring: Prit Kamani, Rachana Shah, Kunal Rajbhatt, Harsh Mehta and Rohan Jain
- Country of origin: India
- Original language: Hindi

Production
- Producers: Tilak Shetty; Munjal Shroff
- Production companies: Graphiti Multimedia; Nick

Original release
- Network: Nickelodeon
- Release: 14 November 2004 – 2005

J Bole Toh Jadoo (transl. J stands for Jadoo) is an Indian animated action television series produced by Graphiti Multimedia. It was co-produced and aired on Nickelodeon India. It is based on the movie Koi... Mil Gaya, which itself is part of Krrish franchise.

J Bole Toh Jadoo was the first locally produced live action-animation show in India.

== Synopsis ==
J Bole Toh Jadoo centered around Jadoo's life on his home planet Tarkopar with his friends Tona and Ki2 alongside Sensei Halftime, his fight against evil on his home planet, and his return to Earth, where he made friends with Nina and Chakki.

== Accolades ==
Tilak Shetty won the AnimationXpress.com Visual Effects Award for his VFX work on J Bole Toh Jadoo.
