= Kid Krrish =

Film series

- Genre: Action; Adventure
- Based on: Krrish by Rakesh Roshan
- Country of origin: India
- Original languages: English; Hindi; Tamil; Telugu

Production
- Executive producer: P Jayakumar
- Production companies: Toonz Animation; Film Kraft Productions; Turner International India

Original release
- Network: Cartoon Network
- Release: 2 October 2013 – 25 April 2015

Kid Krrish is an Indian film series of animated television films produced by Toonz Animation, Film Kraft Productions and Turner International India.

The first film of the series, Kid Krrish was released on 2 October 2013 which is a part of Krrish franchise, with its three sequels: Kid Krrish: Mission Bhutan, Kid Krrish: Mystery in Mongolia and Kid Krrish: Shakalaka Africa.

Kid Krrish was planned as the first movie in the four part series of Kid Krrish films as a part of Krrish franchise.

== List of films ==
#	Title	Original air date
1	Kid Krrish	2 October 2013
2	Kid Krrish: Mission Bhutan	19 July 2014
3	Kid Krrish: Mystery in Mongolia	27 September 2014
4	Kid Krrish: Shakalaka Africa	25 April 2015
