= Krrish (character) =

Film character portrayed by Hritik Roshan

- Hrithik Roshan as Krrish in Krrish 3
- First appearance: Krrish (2006)
- Last appearance: Hrudayantar (2017)
- Created by: Rakesh Roshan
- Portrayed by: Hrithik Roshan; Mickey Dhamijani (young)

In-universe information
- Full name: Krishna Mehra
- Species: Human (alien powered)
- Gender: Male
- Fighting style: Hand to hand combat expert; Peak human IQ; Super strength; Super speed; Stamina; Endurance; Agility; Telekinesis; Photogenic memory; Flight
- Family: Priya Mehra (wife); Dr. Rohit Mehra (father); Nisha Mehra (mother); Sonia Mehra (grandmother)
- Religion: Hinduism
- Nationality: Indian

Krishna Mehra, better known as Krrish, is an Indian superhero appearing in the Krrish film series. Created by Rakesh Roshan and portrayed by Hrithik Roshan, the character was introduced in Krrish (2006) as the son of Dr. Rohit Mehra (also portrayed by Roshan) and Nisha Mehra (portrayed by Preity Zinta) from Koi... Mil Gaya (2003). He later appeared in Krrish 3 (2013), the third instalment in the series.

== Concept and creation ==
After the commercial success of Koi... Mil Gaya (2003), the Roshans confirmed that a sequel was in development. Hrithik Roshan and Rekha were announced to return, while Priyanka Chopra replaced Preity Zinta as the female lead. Chopra confirmed her casting and stated that “the story will start where Koi... Mil Gaya ended”. Rakesh Roshan developed the sequel by shifting the focus to the son of the previous film’s protagonist, who would inherit his father’s special abilities. In an interview with Rediff, Roshan said that the idea for the film came to him after watching The Lord of the Rings trilogy and realising that Jaadoo had already given powers to Hrithik Roshan’s character, Rohit Mehra, in Koi... Mil Gaya. He also stressed that Krrish was intended to have “his own identity” rather than being modelled on Superman or Spider-Man. Roshan further expressed hope that the film would be remembered as the first in the Hindi film industry to demonstrate that it was “no less than any Hollywood film”. The character and film were shaped by a blend of Indian mythology, (such as Krishna's name alluding to the Hindu Lord Krishna), Chinese martial arts, and Hollywood cinema, reflecting Roshan’s ambition to give the project a broader international scale.

== Fictional character biography ==
=== Krrish (2006) ===
Krishna Mehra is the son of scientist Rohit Mehra and Nisha Mehra. After the deaths of his parents, he is raised by his grandmother Sonia, who takes him to a remote mountain village in Himachal Pradesh to conceal the unusual abilities he inherited from Rohit. Before Krishna’s birth, Rohit had been born with a developmental disability after a car accident that killed his father and injured his pregnant mother, Sonia. In Koi... Mil Gaya, Rohit later acquires enhanced mental and physical abilities through his encounter with the alien Jaadoo. Krishna likewise displays extraordinary powers from a young age, with his physical abilities becoming more pronounced as he grows older, eventually surpassing Rohit’s.

As a young man, Krishna lives an isolated life in the village until he meets Priya and her friend Honey, who are visiting from Singapore. After saving Priya from a hang glider accident, he grows close to her, and she later invites him to Singapore. Sonia initially opposes the trip, fearing that Krishna’s abilities will be exploited, but eventually allows him to go after revealing the circumstances surrounding Rohit’s apparent death and Krishna’s birth.

In Singapore, Krishna befriends Kristian Li, a stunt performer, and becomes involved in events connected to Dr. Siddhant Arya, Rohit’s former colleague. During a circus fire, Krishna conceals his identity with a mask and rescues several trapped children. The incident leads to the public emergence of his superhero persona, Krrish. To help Kristian raise money for his sister’s surgery, Krishna allows him to take credit for Krrish’s heroic acts.

Krishna later learns that Rohit is still alive and is being held captive by Arya, who requires Rohit’s retinal scan and heartbeat to operate a rebuilt version of a computer designed to foresee future calamities. After Kristian is killed and Priya becomes further entangled in Arya’s plans, Krishna fully assumes the identity of Krrish and pursues Arya to his island facility. There, he defeats Arya’s men, rescues Priya and Rohit, and fatally injures Arya. Krishna then returns to India with Priya and Rohit, reuniting his family and affirming his role as Krrish.

=== Krrish 3 (2013) ===
Krishna have been wearing his mantle of a superhero; however, in this process, he is fired from a number of jobs in which he was hired.

As a deadly virus created by evil genius Kaal (a paralysed man with telekinetic powers) breaks loose in Mumbai, Krishna's DNA was able to purify it and his father Rohit was able to create an antidote. This increased the respect of Krrish as a hero among public.

Kaal eventually kidnaps Rohit and Priya, and leaves his spy Kaaya to Krishna; however, Kaaya betrays Kaal and falls in love with Krishna, telling him Kaal's hideout. Krrish rescues Priya but Kaaya is killed by Kaal, who takes Rohit's DNA to cure himself as his DNA matched with that of Rohit's. Kaal kills Krrish and escapes to attack Mumbai; however, Rohit revives Krrish using a solar experiment and absorbs the excess energy into his own body, sacrificing himself. Krishna, revived and empowered by the sun, fights Kaal to a stalemate and cannot seem to get an advantage; he resorts to using his father's solar experiment and kills Kaal with it, since there is no container for the excess energy.

Six months later, Krishna and Priya, have a son, who is named Rohit by his mother and has apparently inherited Krishna's superhuman abilities.

== Powers and abilities ==
Krrish inherited his abilities from his father Rohit Mehra, who was augmented by his extraterrestrial friend Jadoo. Krrish's abilities seem to excel Rohit's, as a younger Rohit had demonstrated vulnerability against human foes, while Krrish has comfortably handled superhuman foes like Kaal's mutants.

Krrish demonstrates exceptional intellectual abilities from his childhood. He has excellent observational skills that allow him to learn, adapt, and improvise whatever he sees, hears, or reads within a couple of minutes. He possesses a high IQ level, even as a child, and an eidetic memory, having inherited it from his father although not using it to its full potential.

Krrish possesses extraordinary powers like incredible strength, speed, reflexes, agility, stamina and senses. He has often stunned others with dazzling feats of speed, like spinning at high velocities, generating gales at the wake of his movements, and engaging many foes at once. In Krrish, Krrish was able to outrun a horse with his speed and leaping ability as a warm-up, and when serious, move to intercept bullets. Despite his great power, Krrish is vulnerable to bullets. In Krrish 3, he was able to hold up the side of a skyscraper while being under the pressure of Kaal's telekinesis, albeit with extreme effort and exertion. Krrish's stamina allowed him to keep fighting after using flight, fighting Kaal through buildings and holding up a portion of a huge building.

Due to his upbringing in wilderness, Krrish possesses special abilities related to nature, such as climbing mountains and fishing. He can communicate with animals, such as apes and monkeys. He can run, swim, jump, and leap to a great extent. His vast leaping ability has not been defined yet, but if estimated, then he can leap 1/8 of a mile (200 meters),.

Krrish is a master of martial arts, and has proficient skill with weapons. He acquired these abilities after looking at Kristian Lee's performance, making use of his great observational skills and eidetic memory.

After being killed by Kaal and resurrected by his father, Krrish could use telekinesis, employing it to fly at supersonic speeds. He can also stop projectiles with telekinesis, even being able to redirect them with greater velocity.

== Cultural impact ==
Though other Indian superheroes such as Shaktimaan and Toofan existed before, Krrish was the first major Bollywood superhero which influenced a plethora of upcoming Bollywood superhero movies. Krrish laid the foundation of high budget Bollywood superhero genre and his influences are still relevant.
