= Krrish 3 =

2013 Indian film by Rakesh Roshan

- Theatrical release poster
- Directed by: Rakesh Roshan
- Screenplay by: Rakesh Roshan; Irfan Kamal; Honey Irani; Robin Bhatt; Akarsh Khurana
- Story by: Rakesh Roshan
- Produced by: Rakesh Roshan
- Starring: Hrithik Roshan; Vivek Oberoi; Priyanka Chopra; Kangana Ranaut
- Narrated by: Amitabh Bachchan
- Cinematography: Tirru
- Visual effects by: Haresh Hingorani
- Edited by: Chandan Arora
- Music by: Score: Salim–Sulaiman; Songs: Rajesh Roshan
- Production company: Filmkraft Productions Pvt. Ltd
- Distributed by: Filmkraft Productions Pvt. Ltd (Domestic); Eros International (Overseas)
- Release date: 1 November 2013
- Running time: 152 minutes
- Country: India
- Language: Hindi
- Budget: ₹100 crore
- Box office: ₹393.37 crore

Krrish 3 is a 2013 Indian superhero action thriller film written, produced and directed by Rakesh Roshan, who wrote the screenplay with Honey Irani and Robin Bhatt. It is the third film in the Krrish series, following Koi... Mil Gaya (2003) and Krrish (2006). The film stars Hrithik Roshan, Vivek Oberoi, Priyanka Chopra and Kangana Ranaut. In the film, Krishna Mehra, also known as Krrish, with his wife, Priya Mehra, and his scientist father, Rohit Mehra, face an elaborate conspiracy orchestrated by the mad scientist Kaal and his gang of mutants, led by the ruthless Kaya.

Krrish 3 was initially scheduled to release as a 3D film. However, due to lack of release time to convert the film to 3D, it was released only in the 2D format. Krrish 3 was released worldwide on 1 November 2013. Produced on a budget of ₹100 crore (US$10 million), the film grossed ₹393.37 crore (US$41 million) worldwide. It has received generally positive reviews from critics and is currently the highest-grossing Indian superhero film. Krrish 3 has consistently maintained a position among the top 50 highest-grossing Indian films for over a decade, since its release in 2013.

== Plot ==
Six years after getting rescued and returning to India with his son Krishna after eliminating Dr. Siddhant Arya, Dr. Rohit Mehra now lives with the former in Mumbai while the latter's mother, Sonia Mehra, has passed away in this time period. Krishna is married to Priya, who now works as a reporter for Aaj Tak after resigning from her previous job in Singapore, and Rohit works in a research institute. Krishna, while moonlighting as superhero Krrish, is regularly fired from various day jobs due to lack of attendance. Meanwhile, Rohit is researching a device that will bring dead tissues to life using solar energy (after realizing how Jadoo gave him powers derived from sunlight), but the experiment needs a filter that could pass only the amount of sunlight needed.

A deadly virus is spreading in Namibia whose antidote has not yet been discovered. Rohit's friend Dr. Varun Shetty and Dr. Alok Sen, a scientist who wants to reveal information about the virus, are murdered by Kaya, a shapeshifting female mutant. She is the secretary of Kaal, a handicapped evil geneticist with telekinetic powers. Kaal creates a team of human-animal hybrids called Maanvars (a portmanteau of two Hindi words, "Maanav" meaning human and "Jaanvar" meaning animal) with distinct physical powers to cure himself, but to no avail. The virus was spread by Kaal himself to incur huge profits by selling its antidote. On Krishna's birthday, Priya gives the good news of her pregnancy to Krishna and Rohit. Kaal sends his mutants to India to infect the population. Rohit discovers that the virus, now spreading through Mumbai, has no effect on Krishna, Priya, or himself. He decides to test it on Krishna. Rohit makes an antidote with Krishna's blood, which Krishna spreads over the whole city. Kaal sends his mutants to attack Rohit. Krrish saves Rohit, but Priya is injured. Carrying out Kaal's instructions, Kaya shapeshifts into Priya while Priya is kidnapped by Kaal. Posing as Priya, Kaya leads Krishna to believe that Priya miscarried in the attack. While discovering the truth behind the antidote, she starts loving Krishna one-sidedly and often feels guilty for cheating him.

Meanwhile, Kaal plans to have Priya have an early childbirth so that he could use the child's bone marrow to cure his disability. Kaya, disguised as Krishna, goes to Rohit's home lab, where Rohit reveals that he will travel to Singapore to meet Dr. Mathur, who used to work with Dr. Arya. Rohit hopes this meeting will help solve the mystery behind the virus. At the same time, Krishna walks to the lab to meet Rohit. Kaya, still disguised as Krishna, then transforms into Priya and lies to the real Krishna, saying Rohit is busy with his research work and shouldn't be disturbed. The next day, Rohit calls Krishna and tells him that he had sought every answer from Dr. Mathur. Krishna, unaware of all this, realizes that something is wrong and finds out that Priya has been kidnapped. He transforms into Krrish and confronts Kaya. Kaya finally agrees to help and leads him to Kaal’s secret lab, where Priya is rescued. It is revealed that Kaal is Rohit's biological son, created by an experiment conducted by Dr. Arya while Rohit was held hostage by him years earlier. He was born inheriting Rohit's powers but handicapped except for his face and index fingers. He gets adopted by a wealthy man whom he then kills.

Kaal uses Rohit's bone marrow to cure his disability. Kaya saves Priya but is murdered by Kaal for her disloyalty. Kaal also severely injures Krrish. Rohit reuses his failed dead tissues experiment to save Krishna. However, the beam of light created by the experiment needs a filter to take effect on Krishna. Rohit stands in front of it, allowing only a portion of it to make contact with Krishna. This resurrects Krishna, killing Rohit in the process. Kaal has returned to Mumbai to threaten its citizens should Priya not be found and taken to him. Priya voluntarily surrenders herself, but Krrish then arrives, and a fight between Krrish and Kaal ensues. With the two now capable of flight and super strength, Krrish and Kaal's fighting destroys many buildings across Mumbai, while Krrish is emotionally weakened due to the number of people dying around them. Finally, Krrish manages to kill Kaal using Rohit's solar experiment pen by focusing the unfiltered rays onto him. Six months later, in the aftermath, Krishna and Priya name their newborn son Rohit Mehra. The baby also seems to exhibit superpowers.

== Cast ==
- Hrithik Roshan in dual role as
  - Rohit Mehra, Krishna's father; Kaal's biological father; Priya's father-in-law and Jr. Rohit's grandfather
  - Krishna Mehra / Krrish, Dr. Rohit's son; Kaal's biological brother; Priya's husband and Jr. Rohit's father
- Vivek Oberoi as Kaal, a handicapped evil scientist; Rohit's scientifically created son by Dr. Arya and Krishna's biological brother
  - Rohan Shah as young Kaal
- Priyanka Chopra as Priya Mehra, Krishna's wife; Rohit's daughter-in-law and Jr. Rohit's mother
- Kangana Ranaut as Kaya, Kaal's most trusted henchwoman and Krishna's one-sided lover
- Arif Zakaria as Dr. Varun Shetty, Rohit's scientist friend
- Asif Basra as Dr. Alok Sen, a scientist working at Kaal Pharmaceuticals
- Rajpal Yadav as Kripal Sharma, Krishna's friend and colleague
- Rakhi Vijan as Kripal's wife
- Gowhar Khan as Striker the Frogman
- Nazia Shaikh as Cheetah Woman
- Sameer Ali Khan as Ant Man
- Shaurya Chauhan as Scorpion Woman
- Danniel Kaleb as Rhino Man
- Vineet Sharma as Pilot of Air India aircraft
- Sachin Khedekar as Chief minister of Maharashtra (Special appearance)
- Naseeruddin Shah as Dr. Siddhant Arya (Special appearance)
- Mohnish Behl as Kaal's adoptive father (Special appearance)
- Raju Kher as a scientist in Kaal's lab
- Rekha and Preity Zinta appear as Sonia Mehra and Nisha Mehra in flashback scenes from the archived footage of Koi... Mil Gaya and Krrish
- Suranika Soni as Suranika (an uncredited appearance): The girl asking Rohit about Krrish in their felicitation ceremony

== Production ==
The film was referred to as both Krrish 2 and Krrish 3 in media reports. Hrithik Roshan confirmed in an interview to Rediff.com that on similar lines as with the Rambo franchise (where the first film was named First Blood, then came Rambo and then Rambo 3), the film will be called Krrish 3. Rakesh Roshan also clarified the title to Bollywood Hungama. In an interview director Rakesh Roshan said "I can't reveal the budget of the movie, but it has been a very costly film". The film was reportedly produced on a budget of ₹1.15 billion (US$20 million). Red Chillies VFX, a subdivision of Shah Rukh Khan's motion picture production banner Red Chillies Entertainment, worked on the special effects worth ₹260 million (US$2.7 million) for Krrish 3. The filming process was completed in June 2012, and then the VFX team started their work.

=== Filming ===
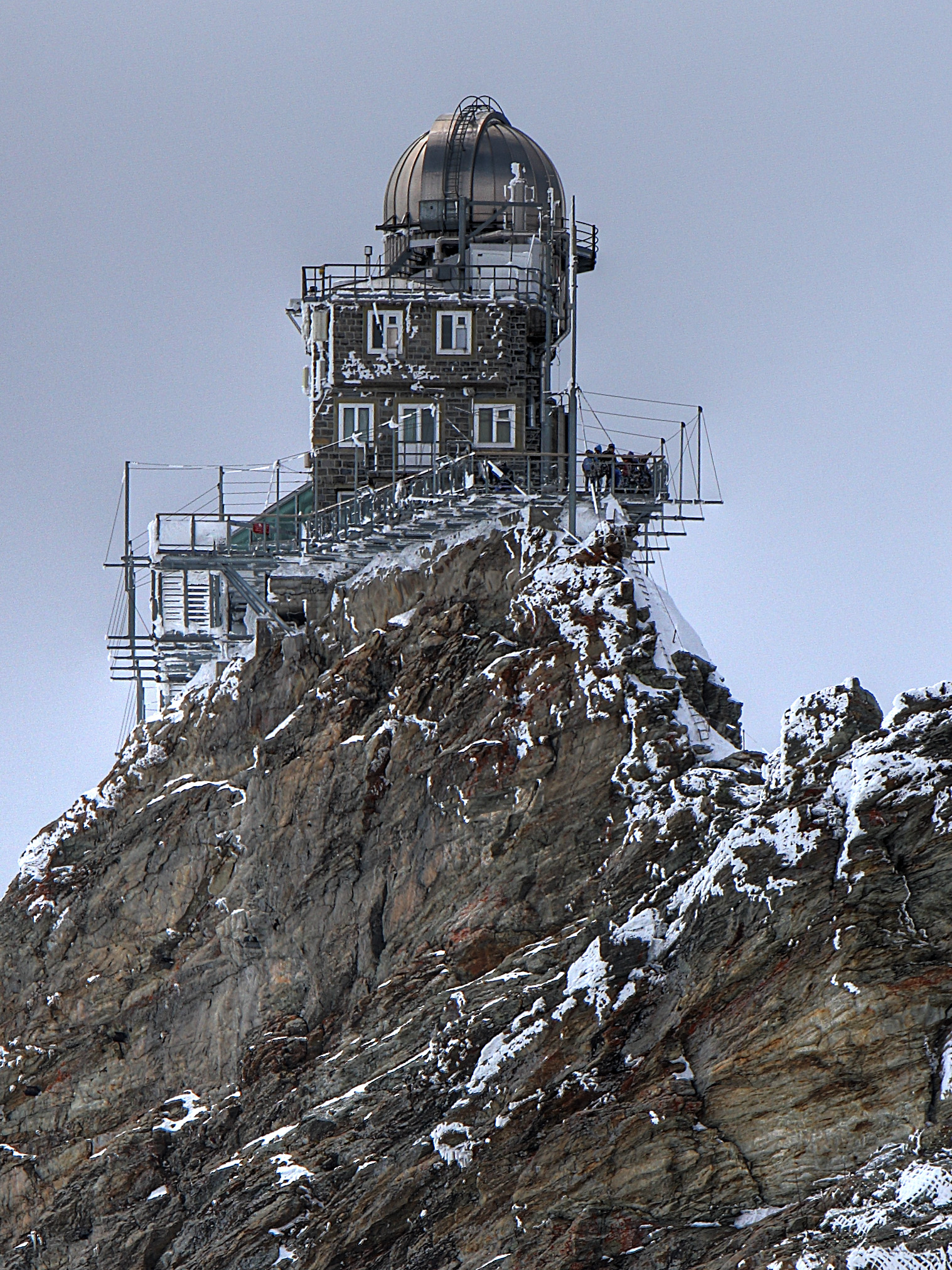
Sphinx Observatory at the Alps, portrayed as Kaal's laboratory in the film

"While shooting in hot and humid conditions in India – in the film studios in Hyderabad, and in Mumbai, the mask [made of wax] would get distorted and start melting. This was because of the high temperature, which would often go up to as high as 44 degrees. At times, it seems it was so hot that in a day, he [Hrithik Roshan] would end up changing five to six masks,"

— The Hindustan Times, who stated that Roshan ended up using 500 masks

Principal photography began on 1 December 2011 with Vivek Oberoi, Kangana Ranaut and Priyanka Chopra. However, Hrithik Roshan did not participate in the first schedule due to a back injury. The primary location of filming was Filmistan Studios at Mumbai. Actress Shaurya Chauhan had an accident while shooting for the film in Hyderabad, due to which the film had to face some delays. On 29 August 2012, it was reported that, the makers had decided the superhero to indulge in the action sequences in snowy terrains. So, some part of the film was shot in Alps, Switzerland. Filming also took place in Jordan where a song featuring Roshan and Ranaut was shot. Rakesh Roshan stated in an interview that the shooting of Krrish 3 was completed by June 2012 with the VFX took one and half years to complete with the last of them coming on 22 October 2013, just 10 days before the release of the film with every VFX action sequence undergoing a revision of 40 to 50 times before inclusion.

=== Casting ===
Following the success of the previous instalments, director Rakesh Roshan planned to develop a second sequel to the franchise, with Hrithik Roshan playing the protagonist again. He had penned the script, but had to re-work it as the storyline was too similar to the Hollywood blockbuster Spider-Man 3. Priyanka Chopra was later confirmed to reprise the role of Priya. In this film, she will be seen married to Krishna Mehra.

Next, Chitrangada Singh announced her inclusion in the project as a mutant but left the film due to unspecified reasons. Later on, Jacqueline Fernandez was signed, but she later on, backed out of the film due to a lack of dates. It was reported that actresses Nargis Fakhri, Esha Gupta and Bipasha Basu were to replace Fernandez. Finally, Kangana Ranaut was confirmed to play the role, who coincidentally was originally offered the role. Rakesh Roshan had earlier revealed to the media that the main antagonist of the film would be as powerful as the hero. After talks with Ajay Devgn and Shah Rukh Khan fell through, Vivek Oberoi was eventually cast for the role. In an interview with Bollywood News Service, Oberoi said, "Kaal is contrary to my nature. I am very friendly, and Kaal isn't," and added, "He has anger and vengeance burning within him; he hates humanity. To express these emotions through my eyes was difficult."

In January 2011, Lakshmi Manchu claimed to have been offered a role in the film as the antagonist's girlfriend. Its overseas distribution rights were sold to Eros International while Rakesh Roshan retained rights in Mumbai. There was also initial speculation that Rekha would play a major role in the film, which was later denied as a rumour.

=== Design and costumes ===
For the cast's costumes, Rakesh Roshan was involved with designer Gavin Miguel. Roshan wanted a light and flexible costume to allow Kangana Ranaut to do her stunts without any restrictions, where he stated: "She has a lot of toughness in her personality. So instead of looking at feminine superheroes for reference, I looked at Batman". It took three and half hours to apply Ranaut's makeup every day. Oberoi is dressed in a metal suit weighing around 28 kilograms, which required about 2–3 hours and 7-8 workers to fix on the body.

== Music ==
The songs of the film are being composed by Rajesh Roshan at Krishna Audio, whilst the background score is being composed by Salim–Sulaiman. The music rights of the film were acquired by T-Series for ₹60 million (US$620,000). The full soundtrack album was released on 19 September 2013 with music composed by Rakesh Roshan.

== Marketing ==
Promotions for the movie started post-July 2013, and the first look of Krrish 3 was unveiled online. Response for the poster was quite enthusiastic from the audience. The first trailer video was published by the filmmakers on their official YouTube channel on 5 August 2013. It received more than 2.3 million views on YouTube within its first day of release and thereby surpassed the record held by Jab Tak Hai Jaan of 1 million views in one day. Krrish 3 trailer became the most watched Bollywood trailer on YouTube with 12 million views within two weeks, even eclipsing the trailers for such Hollywood superhero blockbusters as Thor (2011) and The Avengers (2012). Press reaction has been positive to the teaser trailer with many stating it echoes the look of recent superhero movies from Hollywood such as Iron Man 3, The Amazing Spider-Man and Man of Steel. Author of Bollywood: An Insider's Guide, Fuad Omar wrote on his blog that such comparisons were unfair given they were based on comic books and intellectual properties that had been developed over decades. He commented that Krrish was very much an original character created by Rakesh Roshan and developed by Filmkraft, and so the film and character deserved credit for setting a new standard for an original superhero which has not been seen elsewhere in the world. He also stated that no other filmmaker in India or elsewhere has managed to achieve what Rakesh Roshan and Hrithik Roshan have in completely creating a new character and coming out with a hugely successful franchise that is original and has fueled a fanfare similar to those of comic book heroes, yet with Krrish's story still being written with each film. Krrish 3 was the first Indian film to launch its own official Facebook Emoticons as part of promotion. An official Krrish 3 game was launched for Windows smartphones, tablets and PCs. The game was developed by Hungama Digital Media Entertainment and Gameshastra.

== Release ==
The film was previously expected to release on 4 November 2013 but was brought forward to a 1 November, Diwali release. Krrish 3 released in over 4000 screens worldwide (3500 screens in India) and nearly 600 screens in key circuits overseas. The film was dubbed in Telugu and Tamil for release in South Indian states. The distributors released the film in around 150-200 screens in Tamil Nadu and Kerala circuits.

== Controversy ==
Uday Singh Rajput, a writer from Sagar district in Madhya Pradesh, moved the Bombay High Court alleging copyright violation of the script of Krrish 3 and seeking a stay on the all-India release of the film and claiming ₹20 million compensation. But, the High Court refused to grant relief to the writer.

== Reception ==
On the review aggregator website Rotten Tomatoes, 71% of 17 critics' reviews are positive, with an average rating of 5.8/10. Critics directed praise towards cast performances (particularly Hrithik Roshan, Kangana Ranaut and Vivek Oberoi), VFX, cinematography, background score, direction and entertainment value, but criticism has been directed towards the film's lack of originality, soundtrack and writing.

=== India ===
Taran Adarsh of Bollywood Hungama gave the film 4.5 out of 5 stars and stated that "the film has all the ingredients that make a splendid superhero film, besides being Rakesh Roshan's most accomplished work so far." Madhureeta Mukherjee of The Times of India gave it 4.5 stars while commenting "For sheer vision, bravado and superlative execution, this one soars to new orbits. Latch on to this cape for an exhilarating ride." Raedita Tandan of Filmfare awarded it 4 out of 5 stars, remarking "Hats off to Rakesh Roshan for dreaming big and actually pulling off this risky proposition. It's not perfect. But it has all the elements a good, entertaining film must have. All you Marvel superheroes, better watch out. Krrish is here to stay." Anupama Chopra of the Hindustan Times gave it 3.5 stars and said, "Filmmaker Rakesh Roshan deserves a round of applause for giving us a homegrown superhero. Krrish 3 is ambitious and exciting." Sarita Tanwar of DNA gave it 3.5 stars and wrote, "Krrish 3 is fast-paced and the VFX effects are smashing." Rohit Khilnani of India Today gave it 3.5 stars noting, "The only part where the movie dips are during the songs. The music sounds too dated for this action-packed film."

Rajeev Masand of CNN-IBN gave it 3 out of 5 and stated, "I'm going with two-and-a-half stars for the film, and an additional half star just for Hrithik Roshan, which makes it three out of five for Krrish 3. The film is ambitious but flawed. It is, however, consistently watchable for its terrific lead star who you can't take your eyes off, even for a moment". Sukanya Verma of Rediff.com gave it 3 out of 5 stars, while adding, "Krrish 3 is an outrageous mishmash of Bollywood sentimentality meets E.T. meets Superman meets X-Men with set pieces, sound design and screenplay structure liberally borrowed from Hollywood's imagination." Aparna Mudi of Zee News rated the film 3 stars saying, "'Krrish 3' has all the elements of an entertainer and a lot of potential to have given some serious competition to Hollywood flicks."

Saibal Chatterjee of NDTV gave the film 2.5 stars stating, "Krrish 3 is, for the most part, impressively ambitious and dazzlingly competent, if not always riveting." Karan Anshuman of Mumbai Mirror gave it 2.5 stars and stated that Krrish 3 is a film for kids. Shubhra Gupta of The Indian Express gave it 2 stars out of 5. Mihir Phadnavis of Firstpost stated that "Krrish 3 is the most superficial components of X-Men, Batman, Superman, Spiderman and even Shaktimaan stuffed together." Paloma Sharma of Rediff.com panned the film, and gave it "no stars" saying, "Krrish 3 is astonishingly eager to entertain with its stock of doodads that should amuse if not endear".

=== Overseas ===
Mohammad Kamran Jawaid of the Dawn gave Krrish 3 a rating of 3/5 stars stating that "so most of it is tiringly clichéd, ripped off from Marvel and DC comics (Krrish's Superman worship is rather blatant) and stick-glued together, it is startling when director Rakesh Roshan's underlying Bollywood-emotionalism compensates the flimsiness of the awkward superhero element from his last film". He closes by saying that the film "is family-friendly stereotypical entertainment".

David Chute for the Variety applauded Krrish 3 as "a charming Bollywood superhero movie" from a different perspective and applauded the heart and upbeat spirit of the movie for "not being an audience-pummeling industrial product like most of Hollywood's superhero films." He loved the way Krrish 3 "has the off-hand, anything-is-possible spirit of a children's book or fairy tale."

Lisa Tsering, writing for The Hollywood Reporter gave the film a negative review, saying that "the musical superhero extravaganza is too scary for young viewers and too long-winded for everybody else". She continues that the "effort is admirable and the effects are certainly adequate, but can't compensate for uninteresting, drawn-out action scenes; childish logic and uneven acting, especially by Hrithik Roshan, who as Rohit mouth-breathes and toddles around with his head cocked to one side. Worst of all, the movie is devoid of that one secret ingredient that makes audiences love superhero films: It just isn't cool."

== Box office ==
Krrish 3 had a final worldwide gross of ₹393 crore (US$50 million).

=== India ===
Krrish 3 opened across the country in multiplexes to more than 80 percent occupancy as well as around 90-100 percent attendance at single screens. According to Box Office India, first day collections of all versions were estimated at ₹20.4 crore (US$2.1 million). The film nett. grossed around ₹18.8 crore (US$2.0 million), with its (Tamil) and (Telugu) dubbed versions have collected approximately ₹1.5 crore (US$160,000) nett on the first day. Krrish 3 (Hindi) grossed ₹15.1 crore (US$1.6 million) nett on its second day. Box Office India estimated the first weekend collection of ₹53 crore (US$5.5 million), with around ₹49.5 crore (US$5.1 million) nett for its original version, while the dubbed versions grossed another ₹4.5 crore (US$470,000) nett approx. The film also recorded the sixth highest opening weekend worldwide as it collected ₹92 crore (US$9.6 million) gross. The first Monday business of the Hindi version was estimated at ₹31.5 crore (US$3.3 million), taking its four-day total to ₹80.5 crore (US$8.4 million) and set a new record for the highest single day collection ever, overtaking the previous record held by Chennai Express. Krrish 3 (Hindi) collected around ₹20.5 crore (US$2.1 million) nett on Tuesday to take five-day total past ₹100 crore (US$10 million) to ₹101.25 crore (US$11 million) nett. The film nett. grossed around ₹13 crore (US$1.3 million) on Wednesday taking the 6-day Hindi version total to ₹114.25 crore (US$12 million). The film (along with its Tamil and Telugu dubbed versions nett.) grossed around ₹130.25 crore (US$14 million) in the first week.

The film nett. grossed ₹7.5 crore (US$780,000) on the second Friday. Krrish 3 collected around ₹10.5 crore (US$1.1 million) nett on second Saturday, and ₹13 crore (US$1.3 million) on second Sunday to take the Hindi version nett. total to around ₹153 crore (US$16 million) in ten days. The film's Hindi version earned around ₹4.2 crore (US$440,000) nett on its second Monday, ₹3.75 crore (US$390,000) on Tuesday, ₹3.5 crore (US$360,000) on Wednesday and ₹3.55 crore (US$370,000) on Thursday to take its two-week domestic total to ₹165 crore (US$17 million) nett. The second week thus collected ₹42.9 crore (US$4.5 million) for the Hindi version of Krrish 3. (Note: While Box Office India confirms that the film did not hit the ₹200 crore (US$21 million) nett mark in India even if its dubbed Telugu and Tamil versions earnings are included, other trade analysts like Taran Adarsh and reputed trade magazines claimed that Krrish 3 has lifetime nett collections of all its versions at ₹244 crore (US$25 million) and that the film had emerged as 'the highest grosser of Hindi cinema'.)

Krrish 3 grossed around ₹7 crore (US$730,000) nett in the third weekend to take its Hindi-version total to almost ₹172 crore (US$18 million) nett in 17 days. The Tamil and Telugu versions added a further ₹10 crore (US$1.0 million) nett approx in 17 days to take overall total to ₹182 crore (US$19 million). Krrish 3 grossed ₹174 crore (US$18 million) nett with its Hindi version after the third week. The fourth week collections were ₹2.54 crore (US$260,000) taking the Hindi version's total to around ₹176 crore (US$18 million). According to Box Office India, the three versions together earned ₹188 crore (US$20 million) nett lifetime with the dubbed versions of the film contributing ₹12 crore (US$1.2 million). The lifetime domestic distributor share of the Hindi version was ₹98.5 crore (US$10 million).

Critics claimed that the domestic collections were inflated by almost ₹ 60 crore. Some reputed trade analysts stated that the collections published in trade websites like Bollywood Hungama and Koimoi, which were being shown as nett, were actually gross (including Entertainment tax). Box Office India stated that the domestic nett of the film including Tamil and Telugu versions was ₹188 crore (US$20 million). On 7 January 2014, after being miffed over the alleged inflated collections, Hrithik Roshan maintained that Krrish 3 had done a business of about ₹244 crore (US$25 million) in India and around ₹55 crore (US$5.7 million) overseas.

=== Overseas ===
Krrish 3 did well overseas as it collected around $3.85 million in its first weekend. The film grossed $6.9 million overseas in ten days. It grossed US$7.8 million abroad after seventeen days. The film earned $8.5 million overseas, as of 26 November 2013.

== See also ==
- Science fiction films in India
- List of Hindi films of 2013
- List of Indian superhero films
