= Ibrahim Ashk =

Indian poet and lyricist (1951–2022)

Ibrahim 'Ashk'
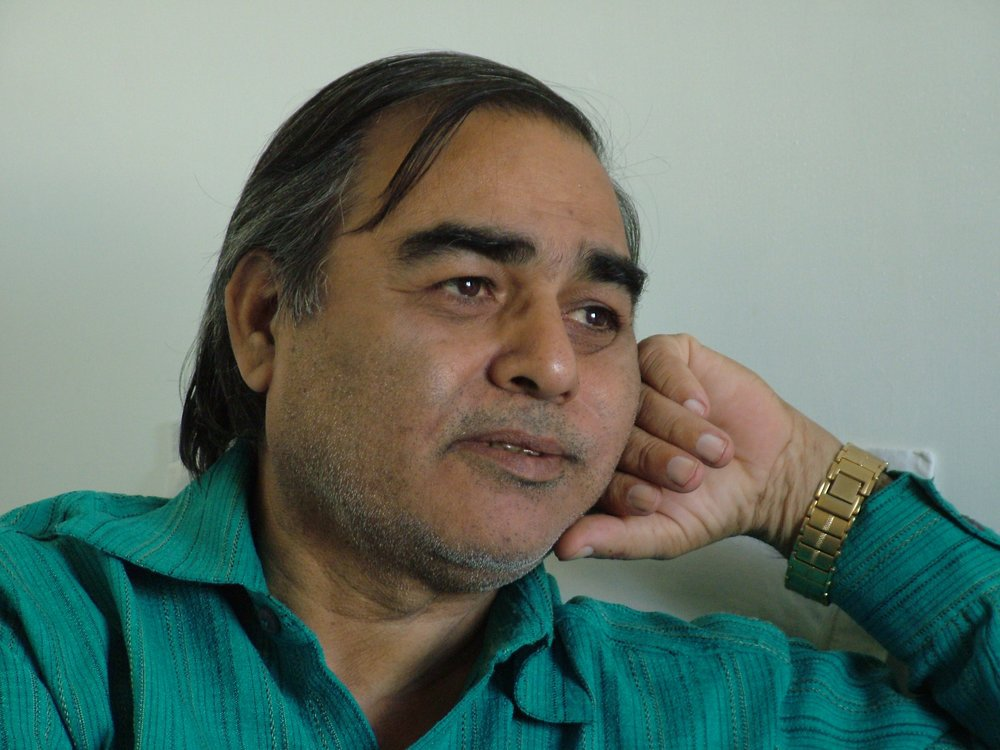
- Born: 20 July 1951; Multanpura, Mandsaur, Madhya Pradesh, India
- Died: 16 January 2022 (aged 70); Mumbai, Maharashtra, India
- Other names: Ibrahim Khan Ghauri
- Occupation(s): poet, journalist, actor, lyricist

Ibrahim Khan Ghauri (20 July 1951 – 16 January 2022) was an Indian Hindi and Urdu poet, journalist, actor and film lyricist. He wrote under the pen name Ashk. He is popular for his lyrics in Hritik Roshan's debut film, Kaho Naa Pyaar Hai. Ashk is well known as a lyricist, and script writer of some well-known films and TV serials. He wrote more than 700 ghazals that were sung by various popular ghazal singers such as Talat Aziz, Jagjit Singh, Chandan Das, Pankaj Udhas, Penaz Masani, Anuradha Paudhwal, Bhupinder Mitali and others in the 80s and 90s.

== Early life and education ==
Ibrahim Ashk was born on July 20, 1951, at Ujjain, Madhya Pradesh. Ashk's early education was at Badnagar, Ujjain district, Madhya Pradesh. He received his B.A. from Indore University in 1973, and his M.A. in Hindi Literature from Indore University in 1974.

== Career ==
A journalist, poet and film writer, he worked for four years with the Daily Indore Samachar, six with Shama and Shushma magazines, and two with Sarita, a Hindi monthly magazine.

Ashk penned the lyrics for a number of songs used in Bollywood films, including "Kaho Naa Pyar Hai", "Koi Mil Gaya", "Janasheen", "Eitbaar", "Aap Mujhe Achche Lagne Lage", "Krrish", "Koi Mere Dil Se Pooche", and "Dhund". He also acted in a serial penned by himself.

Amidst his busy schedule, he took little time out to share his experience and guide the upcoming talent in the Bollywood industry. He organised monthly Lyrics Writing Workshops in Mumbai.

== Death ==
Ashk died of complications from COVID-19 in Mumbai on 16 January 2022, at the age of 70.

== Literary contributions ==
- Ilham – 1991
- Aagahi – 1996 (Collection of Poems)
- Karbala – 1998 (Historical Elegy)
- Andaz-e-Bayan Aur – 2001 (Critical appreciation and explanation of Mirza Asad-ullah Khan `Ghalib’)
- Tanqidi Shaoor – 2004 (Work on Bedil, Hafiz, Ghalib, Iqbal, Firaq Gorakhpuri and different literary subjects)

== Awards and accolades ==
- U.P. Urdu Academy Award – 1991
- All India Benzer Award – 1992
- Maharashtra Hindi Patrakar Sangh Award – 2000 (for Best Lyrics)
- Tata Group of Magazine AV Max Award – 2000 (for Best Lyrics of the year 2000)
- Ujjain's Sahitya Seva Samman – 2001 (Presented by Shri Shiv Mangal Singh Suman, Ex-Vice Chancellor of Vikram University, Ujjain)
- Ghalib Award – 2003 (of the Journal `Intesaab’ Sirong, M.P.)
- Kalidas Samman – 2003 (of M.P. Sadbhawana Manch)
- Kabir Samman – 2003 (of Gunjan Kala Sadan, Jabalpur, M.P.)
- Majrooh Award – 2004 (of Majrooh Academy, Mumbai)
- Hindi-Urdu Sahitya Academy Award – 2004 (Lucknow, U.P.)
- Star Dust Award for Best Lyrics – 2004 (Presented by World Fame Artist Shri M.F.Hussain)
