= Koi... Mil Gaya =

2003 Indian film by Rakesh Roshan

- Theatrical release poster
- Directed by: Rakesh Roshan
- Screenplay by: Rakesh Roshan; Sachin Bhowmick; Honey Irani; Robin Bhatt
- Dialogues by: Javed Siddiqui
- Story by: Rakesh Roshan
- Produced by: Rakesh Roshan
- Starring: Hrithik Roshan; Preity Zinta; Rekha; Rakesh Roshan; Prem Chopra; Johnny Lever
- Cinematography: Sameer Arya; Ravi K. Chandran
- Edited by: Sanjay Verma
- Music by: Rajesh Roshan
- Production company: Filmkraft Productions
- Distributed by: Yash Raj Films
- Release date: 8 August 2003
- Running time: 157 minutes
- Country: India
- Language: Hindi
- Budget: ₹25 crore (Note: Animation World Network and trade analyst Sreedhar Pillai of The Hindu estimated the total budget of Koi... Mil Gaya at ₹250 million (US$2.6 million) respectively; The Indian Express reported that it was ₹250 million (US$2.6 million), but Rakesh Roshan told Shradha Sukumaran of the Express that the cost was over ₹250 million (US$2.6 million).)
- Box office: ₹82.33 crore

Koi... Mil Gaya (Hindi pronunciation: [ˈkoːi mɪl ɡəjaː] transl. Someone... Has Been Found) is a 2003 Indian Hindi-language science fiction-drama film directed and produced by Rakesh Roshan. It stars Hrithik Roshan, Preity Zinta and Rekha. In addition to writing the story, Rakesh also wrote the screenplay with Sachin Bhowmick, Honey Irani, and Robin Bhatt. Koi... Mil Gaya focuses on Rohit Mehra, a developmentally disabled man who contacts an extraterrestrial being later named Jadoo with his late father Sanjay's supercomputer. The film follows his relationship with Nisha, Rohit's friend, who falls in love with him.

After the release of the commercially and critically successful romantic film Kaho Naa... Pyaar Hai (2000), Roshan wanted to work again with his son Hrithik on a different type of film. In June 2001, during the 2nd IIFA Awards, he announced the second film when he received the Best Director award for Kaho Naa... Pyaar Hai. Principal photography was shot by Ravi K. Chandran and Sameer Arya from November 2001 to March 2003 on sets built by Sharmishta Roy in Canada, India, and New Zealand. Roshan's brother, Rajesh Roshan, composed the film's soundtrack and background score. American artists Mark Clobe and Craig Mumma spent ₹4 crore (US$420,000) on its visual effects.

Filmed on a budget of ₹25 crore (US$2.6 million), Koi... Mil Gaya was released on 8 August 2003 and was the first instalment of the Krrish franchise. Promoted with the tagline "You Are Not Alone...", it targeted children and parents. It was the second-highest-earning Indian film of the year, grossing ₹82.326 crore (US$8.5 million) worldwide. The film had a positive critical reception, with most of the praise directed at the cast's performances. Two sequels titled Krrish and Krrish 3 were released in 2006 and 2013, respectively. A fourth installment, announced to be released in 2027.

The recipient of several awards, Koi... Mil Gaya won three National Film Awards (including Best Film on Other Social Issues). At the 49th Filmfare Awards, it was nominated in eleven categories and received five awards, including Best Film, Best Director (Rakesh Roshan), and Best Actor and Best Actor (Critics) (Hrithik Roshan). The film won five of its eleven nominations at the 5th IIFA Awards, including Best Director (Rakesh Roshan) and Best Actor (Hrithik Roshan). Considered a milestone of its genre, it is one of the first Indian films featuring aliens. The character of Jadoo became popular and inspired a spin-off series entitled J Bole Toh Jadoo (2004). This film was considered a turning point in Roshan's career after having a few previous consecutive flops which put his film career in jeopardy.

== Plot ==
Scientist Dr. Sanjay Mehra has created a supercomputer from which he sends variations of the syllable om into space, hoping to attract extraterrestrial life. When he receives a response, his colleagues ridicule him. While driving home, an alien spacecraft appears overhead shortly after responding to his signals through the computer. Distracted, he is involved in a car accident that kills him in an explosion and injures his pregnant wife, Sonia. As a result, their son Rohit is born with a developmental disability. Sonia learns that surgery is the only cure for Rohit's disability, but it could paralyse or kill him. Not wanting to lose her son, she raises him in Kasauli.

Years later, a grown-up Rohit is still in school due to his disability, but has found companionship among six children. A young woman, Nisha, arrives and is initially insensitive towards Rohit because of the childish practical jokes he plays on her, as well as her ignorance of his mental condition. Her friend Raj, who also happens to be Rohit's former classmate, attacks Rohit with his gang, resulting in them breaking his kick scooter. Sonia scolds them for assaulting Rohit, explaining that he did not intentionally make fun of Nisha, and reveals Rohit's condition to her. Realising her mistake, Nisha gifts Rohit a bicycle and introduces him to her parents, who are sympathetic towards him. Rohit and Nisha, now friends, discover Sanjay's old computer, and Rohit inadvertently summons the aliens. The aliens leave hastily, accidentally leaving one of their group behind. Rohit, Nisha, their group of friends, and Sonia befriend the alien, naming him Jadoo, and discover his psychokinetic abilities.

Raj resents Nisha's closeness to Rohit, bullying him and spreading a rumour that he and Nisha are getting married. The rumour upsets both Nisha and Rohit, who is hurt because he believed Nisha was his girlfriend. Jadoo discovers that Rohit is disabled and uses his powers, derived from sunlight, to enhance Rohit's mental and intellectual abilities. The next morning, Rohit develops clear vision. Although only a seventh-standard student, he solves a tenth-standard mathematics problem orally, surprising both his mathematics teacher and the school principal. He also answers questions posed by his computer teacher, who had previously mocked him for his disability, and accidentally beats up Raj's gang as well.

Rohit's physical abilities increase to superhuman levels. Raj's gang challenge Rohit and his friends to a basketball game. Rohit scores several baskets, but Raj's gang begin to cheat. When the sun emerges, Jadoo helps Rohit's team win the match. Rohit confesses his love to Nisha, and she reciprocates. Raj's gang later confront Rohit's group about the basketball game. While fleeing, the group accidentally drop Jadoo. Constable Sukhwani sees Jadoo inside a bag and calls for backup. Led by Inspector Khan, the police capture the bag; however, Rohit rescues Jadoo. Confronted by Raj's gang, an enraged Rohit overpowers them before the police arrive. Jadoo is not in the bag, having escaped while Chelaram was calling the other officers.

Suspicious of Rohit, Khan confronts him at his house with several other officers. The police seize Jadoo and knock Rohit unconscious. When he regains consciousness, Rohit catches up with the police vans in time to prevent Jadoo from being sent to the United States. The flying saucer summoned using his father's computer returns, and Rohit bids an emotional farewell to Jadoo. After Jadoo leaves, Rohit reverts to his former self; this saves him from prosecution by the government, who congratulate him for his actions.

Raj's gang later harass Rohit and Nisha, challenging Rohit to kick a ball towards them. He angrily kicks the ball into Raj's face and realises that Jadoo has permanently restored his superhuman abilities. Rohit and Nisha thank Jadoo and get married.

== Cast ==
The cast is listed below:

- Hrithik Roshan as Rohit Mehra: Dr. Sanjay and Sonia's mentally disabled son; Nisha's love-interest and Alien Jadoo's friend who gifts him with his superhuman powers to cure his disability
  - Micky Dhamijani as child Rohit
- Preity Zinta as Nisha Malhotra: Rohit's and Raj's love-interest
- Rekha as Sonia Mehra: Dr. Sanjay's widow and Rohit's mother
- Indravardan Purohit as Jadoo: The stranded alien friend of Rohit who gifts him with his superhuman powers to cure latter's mental disability
- Rajat Bedi as Raj Saxena: Harban's son; Nisha's friend and Rohit's former classmate who keeps bullying Rohit with his gang
- Rakesh Roshan as Dr. Sanjay Mehra: A scientist; Sonia's husband and Rohit's father
- Prem Chopra as Collecter Harbans Saxena: District magistrate of Kasauli and Raj's father
- Johnny Lever as Constable C. Sukhwani: Rohit's neighbour
- Mukesh Rishi as Inspector Khan: Incharge of Rohit's locality
- Akash Khurana as Father Robericks: Principal of the Catholic School where Rohit studied and was always supportive and sympathetic to his condition
- Ravi Jhankal as Mr. Chaturvedi: Rohit's Mathematics teacher who was supportive and sympathetic to his condition
- Mithilesh Chaturvedi as Mr. Mathur: Rohit's computer teacher who used to bully him for his mental condition
- Rajeev Verma as Mr. Malhotra: Nisha's father
- Vivek Shauq as Basketball match commentator
- Beena Banerjee as Indu Malhotra: Nisha's mother
- Anjana Mumtaz as Mrs. Saxena: Harbans' wife and Raj's mother
- Anuj Pandit as Bittu: A Sikh child in Rohit's friends group
- Mohit Makkad as Bunty: One of the child in Rohit's friends group
- Jay Choksi as Aslam: One of the child in Rohit's friends group
- Omkar Purohit as a child in Rohit's friends group
- Hansika Motwani as a child in Rohit's friends group
- Pranita Bishnoi as a child in Rohit's friends group

== Production ==
=== Development ===
Following the success of the romantic thriller Kaho Naa... Pyaar Hai (2000), the director Rakesh Roshan wanted to collaborate again with his son, Hrithik Roshan, who starred in the film alongside the debutante Ameesha Patel. The director wanted his next project to be a child-centric film, not just a romance, which Rakesh Roshan had done many times in his career both as a director and actor. He told Bollywood Hungama that he was motivated to make a film that was not "run-of-the-mill" but "an out-of-the-box yet entertaining, mainstream film", after attending the premiere of Lagaan in June 2001 during the 2nd IIFA Awards. He announced it subsequently at the ceremony while he was receiving the Best Director award for Kaho Naa... Pyaar Hai. The idea to make a film on extraterrestrial life came up when he saw his five-year-old granddaughter watching a series about it on a cartoon network. He later informed Hrithik Roshan of the project when the latter was shooting the 2001 release Yaadein in Delhi; Hrithik Roshan accepted the role immediately.

Rakesh Roshan used a "K" as the film's initial, his favourite letter he used in all of his directorial ventures. The film was originally titled Koi Aap Jaisa (transl. Someone Like You), Koi... Tumsa Nahin (transl. No One... is Like You), and Kaisa Jaadu Kiya (transl. What Kind of Magic You Have Done), before Koi... Mil Gaya (transl. I Have Found Someone...)—which sounded more romantic to him than any of the previous titles—was finally chosen. He wrote the screenplay with Sachin Bhowmick, Honey Irani, and Robin Bhatt. This took between two and three weeks before its first draft was done in Khandala. Unfamiliar with the topic, Rakesh Roshan confessed he was initially reluctant and doubtful of the project, but Hrithik Roshan convinced him. According to Rakesh Roshan, the screenwriters were "contributing new ideas since the premise itself was so new". He described it as "a very emotional, thematic film" and "the greatest challenge" of his life, saying that science fiction was not the main theme of the film. Though many have commented on the film's similarities to E.T. the Extra-Terrestrial (1982), Rakesh Roshan denied being inspired by it. Javed Siddiqui finished the dialogue. Koi... Mil Gaya was produced by Rakesh Roshan under Filmkraft Productions, which he established in 1980, and distributed by Yash Raj Films.

=== Casting ===
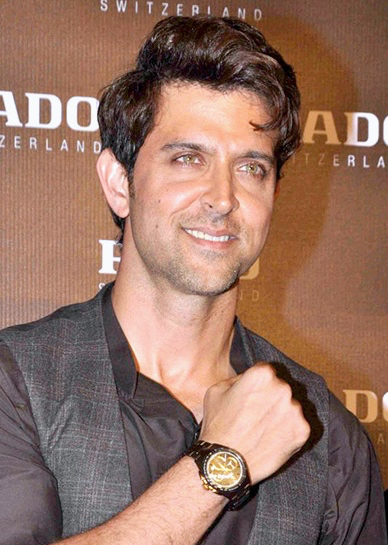
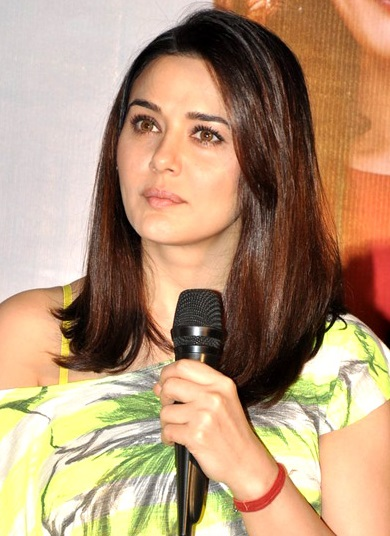
Hrithik Roshan and Preity Zinta were cast in the lead roles in Koi... Mil Gaya

When Koi... Mil Gaya was announced, Rakesh Roshan said that his son Hrithik Roshan and Preity Zinta would play the lead roles in the film; it marked the actors' second collaboration after Mission Kashmir (2000). Playing against typecasting, Hrithik Roshan was cast as the developmentally disabled man Rohit. He admitted the role had reminded him of his childhood, saying he could eat as many chocolates as he wanted and "became a baby and everybody was so caring towards me". Hrithik Roshan called it the "most challenging role" of his career, but revealed he had accepted the part after his father first offered it to him, confessing that his excitement made the role feel much easier. In a retrospective interview with Mint, he explained that he "revisited that earlier passion I had felt when I did my first film". To provide an accurate portrayal, Hrithik Roshan lost 8 kilograms (18 lb), changed his hairstyle, and wore loose clothes to cover his well-built body.

Zinta was given the role of Rohit's friend and then-wife, Nisha, after Rakesh Roshan saw her 20-minute performance in Mani Ratnam's 1998 thriller Dil Se.. and was impressed by it. It was originally to be played by Aishwarya Rai Bachchan or Kareena Kapoor; however, he saw that Rai Bachchan would not be a suitable co-actor as she was older than Hrithik Roshan, while Kapoor opted out because she had collaborated with the actor on several projects being Yaadein (2001), Kabhi Khushi Kabhie Gham... (2001), Mujhse Dosti Karoge! (2002) and Main Prem Ki Diwani Hoon (2003). Zinta, who enjoyed her part as Nisha and called Koi... Mil Gaya a special film for her, described the role as an attempt to change her "conventional heroine" image, telling Rediff.com that: "If I only did the glam-and-pout act, I would have stuck out like a sore thumb and destroyed the film's timeless texture." The part proved to be a new challenge for her, and she found it to be her career's "toughest" role as it was "a very-controlled character". Hrithik Roshan spoke positively of his rapport with her, and said he would "have been only half effective" if she was not his co-star.

In July 2001, Rekha joined the cast and portrays Rohit's mother Sonia, a part that was specifically written by Rakesh Roshan for her. Rakesh Roshan recommended she play the character as soon as he had finished writing the film's screenplay. "I didn't even have a back-up artiste in mind for her role. If she had turned me down, I wonder what I would've done", he told Filmfare. Discussing the film and its casting with the press, Hrithik Roshan said that she was the best on-screen mother and called her "marvellous". Rekha saw that her part was "not too big", but believed that the role's motherhood aspect made it "worthwhile". The film was her second project with Zinta following Dil Hai Tumhaara in 2002; it also reunited her with Rakesh Roshan after both had worked together on several films such as Khubsoorat (1980) and Khoon Bhari Maang (1989). After Anil Kapoor, Jackie Shroff, and Rishi Kapoor rejected the role, Rakesh Roshan decided to play the small role of Rohit's father and Sonia's husband, the scientist Sanjay. The film marked his comeback to acting following the 1999 comedy-drama Mother.

Indravadan J. Purohit got the part as the alien Jadoo. According to him, Rakesh Roshan had offered the role to 30 or 40 people before he gave it to him without any screen tests. To prepare, Purohit lost several kilograms of weight, joined a gym, and followed a strict diet. Four months before the beginning of shooting, he went to Australia to model his 15 kilogram (33 lb.), three foot (nearly one metre) animatronical mask, which was created by the Australian artists James Colmer and Lara Denman from Bimini Special Effects Studios. They were both emotional when Rakesh Roshan narrates the film's screenplay, and they later showed a number of sketches for the mask that took a half-hour each to draw. The mask took nearly a year to build. and cost ₹100 million (US$1.0 million). Because the mask was heavy, Purohit needed oxygen after shooting every one of his scenes to avoid suffocating. Having starred in more than 300 films (all of which feature him in comic roles), he thought with Koi... Mil Gaya he got "a role of a lifetime" and considered the film to be a career boost.

Anuj Pandit Sharma was cast as Hrithik Roshan's child friend Bittu after Rakesh Roshan saw him in the television serial Apun Toh Bas Vaise Hi starring Satish Shah in which he played the same character.

=== Filming ===
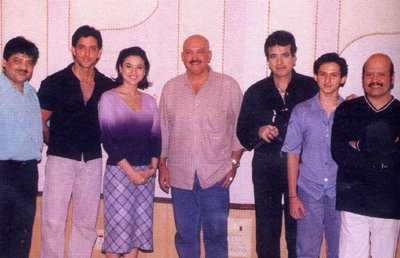
Udit Narayan, Hrithik, Priety, Rakesh, Jeetendra, Eshaan Roshan and Rajesh Roshan (from left to right) at the muhurat of Koi... Mil Gaya in 2001

Principal photography for Koi... Mil Gaya began on 12 November 2001, in Film City, during the Dhanteras celebration. The total budget ranged from ₹250 million (US$2.6 million) to ₹350 million (US$3.6 million), making it the most expensive film Rakesh Roshan had made at the time. Ravi K. Chandran and Sameer Arya were the cinematographers, while Sharmishta Roy was the production designer. Rocky Star and Komal Shahani designed the costumes for the rest of the cast. Farah Khan, Raju Khan, and Ganesh Hegde served as the choreographers, and Allan Amin and Tinu Verma did the action direction. The shooting of Koi... Mil Gaya took place in Nainital, Bhimtal, Kasauli and Canada. A mall replica was built in the film complex for the film's 14-day shooting schedule. A schedule in Canada was completed after three days, and the songs "Jaadoo Jaadoo" and "In Panchiyon Ko Dekh Kar" were shot there. In September 2002, the entertainment portal Bollywood Hungama reported that the film was 40 percent completed.

Chandran used shadows and smoke to make the film's sets look dark for the scenes that feature aliens, as he faced difficulties shooting those scenes in bright light. The spaceship, in which Jadoo visited Earth in the film, was designed by Colmer and Denman and built in a year. During filming, Hrithik Roshan was also shooting three other projects—Na Tum Jaano Na Hum (2002), Mujhse Dosti Karoge! (2002), and Main Prem Ki Diwani Hoon (2003). In 2018, Rakesh Roshan revealed its climax sequences were shot in two different versions: in the first one, Rohit lost all of his powers after Jadoo left Earth, while in the second, Rohit did not lose them. After hearing opinions from many directors (such as Aditya Chopra, Karan Johar, Subhash Ghai, and Yash Chopra, he decided to use the second ending, presuming the audience would be satisfied by it.

Shooting ended in March 2003, and Koi... Mil Gaya was edited by Sanjay Verma. With help from the Bangalore-based company Compudyne Winfosys, the American artists Marc Klobe and Craig Mumma, who previously collaborated on the science fiction films Independence Day (1996) and Godzilla (1998), were involved in the special effects. They were enthusiastic about their first Bollywood project, and Rakesh Roshan asked them to be thrifty; they spent ₹40 million (US$420,000). Nonetheless, the director confessed that the film's total cost was still excessive for him and attributed this problem to the special effects and making Jadoo's costumes.

== Music ==
Rajesh Roshan composed the soundtrack and background score for Koi... Mil Gaya. Ibrahim Ashk, Nasir Faraaz, and Dev Kohli wrote the lyrics, while Udit Narayan, K. S. Chithra, Alka Yagnik, Tarsame Singh Saini, Shaan, Kavita Krishnamurti, Baby Sneha, Adnan Sami, and Preeti Uttam Singh performed the vocals. The album was sold for ₹50 million (US$520,000) to Saregama who released it on 31 May 2003.

== Marketing ==
Koi... Mil Gaya was one of the most anticipated Indian films of 2003, owing to its science fiction genre, one rarely used by any Indian films before, and the character Jadoo. Promoted with the tagline, "You Are Not Alone...", the film was targeted at children and parents. The TV spots, created by Prime Focus company, were aired on television for a week. As a part of the promotion, MTV India managed a special show for the film, titled MTV Making of the Movie (containing interviews of the cast and crew) which aired between 10 and 14 August.

After seeing its promotional trailers, Komal Nahta, the editor of the trade magazine Film Information, reported: "This has been my gut feeling ever since I heard the narration of the film concept. But the magic of the film comes across even through the promos." Amod Mehra said that the film's themes would successfully attract an audience, giving "adults ... a chance to relive their childhood". Sharing the same sentiments, the critic and film trade observer Taran Adarsh added that "the combination of Hrithik, Rakesh and Rajesh Roshan" would make its opening "bumper".

== Release ==
=== Theatrical ===
A special screening was held for Prime Minister Atal Bihari Vajpayee and Deputy Prime Minister Lal Krishna Advani along with their families on 2 August 2003 in Mumbai. After watching the film, Vajpayee told Rakesh Roshan that he had made "a very good film". The film was released theatrically six days later and clashed with Vikram Bhatt's Footpath and Satish Kaushik's Tere Naam. According to Rediff.com's Syed Firdaus Ashraf, who attended its premiere in Mumbai, he saw that children would continuously shout, "Jadoo! Jadoo!". He also reported that the film's tickets were being sold illegally by black marketeers at a higher price.

It was screened at the 2nd International Special Film Festival (organised by ActionAid) on 14–20 March 2003 and the 15th NatFilm Festival on 11 April.

==== Censorship ====
The Central Board of Film Certification finished the censorship review of the film on 25 July and gave it a "U" (suitable for all age groups) certification. Koi... Mil Gaya garnered high expectations from trade analysts as well, which left Hrithik Roshan restless.

==== Localization ====
A German-dubbed version was released under the title of Sternenkind (transl. Star Child) in Germany, Austria, and Switzerland during Christmas of 2005.

=== Home media ===
Distributed by Yash Raj Films, it was released on DVD on 15 September 2003 in a single-disc pack. It is also available on CD and VCD distributed by Moser Baer and Eros International, respectively. According to an estimate by The Economic Times in June 2004, the DVD version had sold around 15,000 units, while for the VCD version sold 150,000 units; the film thus grossed ₹40 million (US$420,000). Eros International released its triple-disc CD version in the NTSC widescreen format as well.

The television rights to Koi... Mil Gaya were sold to Sony Entertainment Television in February 2004, and the worldwide premiere occurred on 24 October. The film has been streaming on Netflix and Amazon Prime Video since 30 November 2016.

== Reception ==
=== Box office ===
Koi... Mil Gaya was successful at the box office, due to the audience's sympathy for Hrithik Roshan's character as a man with developmental disability. Trade analysts speculated the film would be an "acid test" for the actor. The film was released on 450 screens across India and grossed ₹22.5 million (US$230,000) on its opening day, the year's second-highest first-day earnings. It grossed ₹64.5 million (US$670,000) by the end of its opening weekend, and ₹129 million (US$1.3 million) after its first week. Koi... Mil Gaya earned ₹724.9 million (US$7.5 million) in India, becoming the highest-grossing Indian film of 2003.

Abroad, the film did not attract much of an audience. As reported by Rediff.com, it debuted in 29th place in North America, where it was released on 55 screens, and grossed less than $300,000 after a three-day run. Following its first weekend, the film had collected ₹32 million (US$330,000). It earned ₹98.4 million (US$1.0 million) after finishing its overseas theatrical run, becoming the fifth-highest-grossing Indian film of the year. Summarizing the film's total gross in India and overseas, the film-trade website Box Office India estimated Koi... Mil Gaya grossed ₹823.3 million (US$8.5 million), making it 2003's second-highest-grossing Indian film.

=== Critical response ===
On the review aggregator website Rotten Tomatoes, 80% of 10 critics' reviews are positive, with an average rating of 5.4/10. Koi... Mil Gaya opened to a positive critical reception, with most critics applauding the cast's performances (especially that of Hrithik Roshan). Rekha and Zinta's performances were panned; several critics found them to be "utterly wasted" serving only as the film's "decorative piece[s]". In spite of that, Rekha's performance was better received critically. Udita Jhunjhunwala of Mid-Day observed, "You walk into Koi... Mil Gaya expecting to find a mysterious alien, what you end up discovering is a child inside you." She praised Roshan for his performance in "his bravest role". Bollywood Hungama noted, "Hrithik Roshan dominates the show and packs in a power-packed performance. The role of a mentally challenged person is no cakewalk, but the actor takes to it like a fish takes to water. He manages to pull off the zero-to-hero routine exceptionally well. As an actor, he scales dizzier heights with this splendid performance." Rediff.com's R. Swaminathan called the actor "the turbojet that propels the film to the realm of the extraordinary", and believed that the film's screenplay and dialogues gave his character "flesh and blood". However, he felt Jadoo's design was "a big letdown", saying that it was "plasticky" and "does not exude life".

Writing for The Afternoon Despatch & Courier, Deepa Gahlot described Koi... Mil Gaya as "a great demo of the Bollywood style of filmmaking", but criticised its scientific inaccuracy. Manjulaa S. Negi of the Hindustan Times was not satisfied by the special effects and compared them to Independence Day (1996). Screen's editor Bhawana Somaaya appreciated Hrithik Roshan's performance, finding it to be "very sincere" and "brave"; she also took note of the film's "refreshing" subject. Sharing a similar view, Dinesh Raheja felt Hrithik Roshan had delivered "a cherish-worthy performance". Both critics added the child actors, who accompanying Hrithik Roshan's character throughout the film, contributed positively to his performance. Ziya Us Salam was sure Rekha was underdeveloped and Lata Khubchandani, in her review for Sify, questioned why she was cast for the role; Khalid Mohamed, who gave the film four stars, presumed that Rekha's role made her "restrained"—an opinion shared by Nahta. Of Zinta's performance, Nahta opined: "Preity Zinta does not have a very significant role in terms of the value she adds although she has a running role. She looks pretty and acts well." Vijay Venkataramanan of Planet Bollywood appreciated Rekha's strong chemistry with Hrithik Roshan.

Chitra Mahesh from The Hindu commended Hrithik Roshan and the cast of the children, while referring to the character Jadoo as "amateurish". In his five-star review published by B4U, Parag Chandrabala Maniar lauded the efforts of Rakesh Roshan "to provide pure and clean entertainment" and Kolbe's and Mumma's special effects. He said of Hrithik Roshan, "[He] proves his versatility as an actor. At times he moves you and at others he makes you laugh. Here's is (sic) definitely an actor to reckon with. The number of flops notwithstanding, Hrithik Roshan is here to stay." Meenakshi Rao of The Pioneer complimented his acting style, considering him to be "endearing, as endearing as a child of his mental age". The Times of India's Omar Qureshi elaborated, "Hrithik blows away all doubts, theories, criticisms and disbelief with an extraordinarily touching performance of a mentally challenged boy in a rough man's world. He surprises you with his reserves of pathos, his gamut of emotion and his transition from weak boy to strong man. Here is a sterling act, worthy of all awards this year—thus far. He is simply incredible, even in his voice modulations, his sloppy walk and his lopsided smile." An Indo-Asian News Service critic wrote that the pairing of Hrithik Roshan and Preity Zinta took "the couple conventions of Hindi cinema far beyond the escapades of typical Hindi cinema".

Overseas critics focused their attention on Hrithik Roshan's performance and the film's themes, while also pointing out its many similarities to American SF films (most notably E.T.). Ed Halter of The Village Voice predicted that the film's elements, including its "nonstop plagiarism from classics like E.T., Star Wars, and Close Encounters of the Third Kind", might be embraced by foreign nerds. Grady Hendrix of Film Comment commented that the film was an "embarrassment of riches", summarising, "... it's mockable, it's silly, it's cloaked in a cloying miasma of cute, but its off-handed facility with pop-cinema conventions, spiced up with some jarring stylistic disconnects, delivers the most mind-bending entertainment experience of the season. This is commercial moviemaking taken to its logical, mondo mercantilist conclusion." M. J. Simpson expressed approval of the entire cast, especially Hrithik Roshan, whom he regarded as the film's "oddest aspect". Calling it "bright, loud and relentless fun", Jürgen Fauth gave the film three-and-a-half-out-of-five stars and reviewed its comedic, romantic, science-fictional, musical, action, and melodramatic elements positively. Empire magazine hailed it as the "most novel Bollywood movie of the year". The BBC's Manish Gajjar described Hrithik Roshan's role as a "mentally-retarded-child-[turned]-superman-hero". Derek Elley praised him for avoiding his typecasting as a romantic hero, while David Parkinson of Radio Times thought that the film served as "slick, sentimental entertainment". Writing for TV Guide, Maitland McDonagh singled out Jadoo's expression in the scene where he is lost in a forest for praise.

=== Accolades ===
Koi... Mil Gaya won three awards at the 51st National Film Awards, including National Film Award for Best Film on Other Social Issues tied with Prakash Jha's crime film Gangaajal. At the 49th Filmfare Awards, the film was nominated for eleven categories including Best Actress (Zinta), Best Supporting Actress (Rekha), Best Performance in a Comic Role (Johnny Lever), and Best Music Director (Rajesh Roshan). It went on to win five trophies including Best Film, Best Director for Rakesh Roshan, and Best Actor and Best Actor (Critics) for Hrithik Roshan. At the sixth Bollywood Movie Awards, Hrithik Roshan received Best Actor and Best Actor (Critics), while Rekha was acknowledged as the year's Best Supporting Actress. The film won five of eleven nominations at the fifth International Indian Film Academy Awards, including Best Director (Rakesh Roshan) and Best Actor (Hrithik Roshan). It also earned five Screen Awards, five Zee Cine Awards, four Producers Guild Film Awards, and two Stardust Awards.

== Legacy ==
Koi... Mil Gaya, often abbreviated as KMG, has been widely regarded as the first Indian science fiction film with alien characters in it, although this was disputed by several film experts. In The Liverpool Companion to World Science Fiction Film (2014), professors Jessica Langer and Dominic Alessio wrote that the Tamil-language film Kalai Arasi (1963) should be given the title.^{:56} Writing for The New York Times, the critic and author Anupama Chopra stated that Koi... Mil Gaya was "Hindi cinema's first major science fiction film". The BBC reported that the film "is certainly a milestone in the reformation of commercial Indian cinema as a whole", and the American graphic artist Aaron Marcus, in his 2014 book Design, User Experience, and Usability: Health, Learning, Playing, Cultural, and Cross-Cultural User Experience called it the most popular Bollywood science fiction film.^{:75} In 2016, Mint featured Koi... Mil Gaya on its lists of "Children's Day: 10 Memorable Bollywood Films" and "Ten Bollywood films Dealing with Disability".

After making his debut in Kaho Naa... Pyaar Hai (2000), Hrithik Roshan starred in a series of romantic films, most of which under performed financially including Yaadein (2001), Aap Mujhe Achche Lagne Lage (2002), and Na Tum Jaano Na Hum (2002). Trade analysts believed that his career was ended by these failures. The release of Koi... Mil Gaya, which Hrithik Roshan wanted to revive his career, changed analysts' perspectives of the actor and suggested that the film resurrected his position in the industry. While attending its premiere, Nahta told Rediff.com that it was "very important for him. Hrithik is not 'out' of the industry but his position is shaky. So, if the audience likes the film, it is good for him." In 2010, Filmfare magazine included his performance on their list of "80 Iconic Performances" of Hindi cinema, writing, "It's incredible how the actor manages to diminish his size, unstylise his look, wear bug-eyed glasses and talk funny ... Watch him laugh, cry or bond with his remote controlled alien friend and note his nuanced turn." He and Zinta collaborated again in the war drama Lakshya (2004), which failed at the box office although he received positive feedback. In 2005, Zinta chose Koi... Mil Gaya as one of her favourite films.

The film was remade into a soap opera in Indonesia under the title Si Yoyo (2003–2007) and in Telugu as Orey Pandu (2005). Following the film's success, Jadoo became popular with children. Nickelodeon India aired a spin-off television series based on the character, titled J Bole Toh Jadoo, in 2004. In 2020, after the United States Department of Defense published footage of an unidentified flying object, internet memes relating to the film went viral; most of them use the scene where Rohit summons aliens by his father's computer.

== Sequels ==
Although Koi... Mil Gaya was originally conceived as a stand-alone film, it is the first installment in the Krrish franchise. In November 2004, in an interview with Subhash K. Jha of Rediff.com, Hrithik Roshan announced that his father, Rakesh Roshan, had begun the production of a sequel to Koi... Mil Gaya, based on a screenplay which was written in eight or nine months. A superhero film titled Krrish, Hrithik Roshan would play a dual role, reprising his part as Rohit from the original film and playing the character's eponymous son. While Rekha also reprised her role in the sequel, Zinta's position as the female lead was given to Priyanka Chopra. Produced on a budget of ₹500 million (US$5.2 million), principal photography started in March 2005 and finished in January 2006. Krrish opened on 23 June 2006 to mixed reviews, with critics were disappointed by the replacement of Zinta. However, the film was a commercial success and became the second-highest-grossing Indian film that year, earning more than ₹1 billion (US$10 million).

A second superhero sequel, Krrish 3, was announced in December 2006. Hrithik Roshan and Chopra reprise their roles, while Vivek Oberoi and Kangana Ranaut play the antagonists. The film was originally scheduled to be released as a 3D film, but the idea was scrapped. Although Rakesh Roshan never officially confirmed its budget, reports from the media estimated it to be above ₹1 billion (US$10 million). Filming took place between December 2011 and June 2012. Krrish 3 premiered on 4 November 2013 and was declared a commercial success, emerging as the fourth-highest-grossing Indian film of the year. Critics panned its lack of originality, although Hrithik Roshan's performance garnered praise.

As per latest update by Rakesh Roshan, Krrish 4 will begin it's filming in Summer 2026 with a targeted release in 2027. This time Hrithik himself will direct the movie along with lead and reprise his titular character and the movie will be jointly produced by Rakesh and Aditya Chopra of Yash Raj Films.

== See also ==
- Science fiction films in India
- E.T. the Extra-Terrestrial, a 1982 science fiction by Steven Spielberg with a similar premise
- The Alien (unproduced film), a 1960s film by Indian filmmaker Satyajit Ray based on his short story "Bankubabur Bandhu", often claimed to be a basis for E.T. and Koi... Mil Gaya
