= Nasir Faraaz =

Indian lyricist

- Born: Syed Nasir Ali; 1965
- Died: 15 January 2023 (aged 57–58); Nallasopara
- Occupation(s): Lyricist, songwriter

Syed Nasir Ali better known as Nasir Faraaz (1965–2023) was an Indian songwriter and lyricist. He predominantly worked in Bollywood. He was known for his work in films like Baajirao Mastani, Kaabil, Kites, Koi Mil Gaya, Krrish and Love at Time Square.

== Career ==
Faraaz had penned Zindagi Do Pal Ki and Dil Kyu Ye Mera from Kites sung by KK. He is also known for writing Kaabil Hoon from Kaabil starring Hrithik Roshan.

== Awards ==
- Nomination: Mirchi Music Award for Lyricist of The Year (2015) for "Deewani Mastani" from Bajirao Mastani.

== Death ==
Faraaz died on 15 January 2023 after chest pain. His friend Mujtaba Aziz Naza confirmed his death and revealed he was a heart patient and had a surgery seven years prior to his death. He is buried in Nalasopara Qabristan.
