= Krrish =

2006 Indian film by Rakesh Roshan

- Theatrical release poster
- Directed by: Rakesh Roshan
- Screenplay by: Sachin Bhowmick; Rakesh Roshan; Akarsh Khurana; Honey Irani; Robin Bhatt
- Story by: Rakesh Roshan
- Produced by: Rakesh Roshan
- Starring: Hrithik Roshan; Priyanka Chopra; Naseeruddin Shah; Rekha; Sharat Saxena; Manini Mishra
- Cinematography: Santosh Thundiyil
- Edited by: Amitabh Shukla
- Music by: Score: Salim–Sulaiman; Songs: Rajesh Roshan
- Production company: Filmkraft Productions Pvt. Ltd
- Distributed by: Yash Raj Films (India); Adlabs (International)
- Release date: 23 June 2006
- Running time: 175 minutes
- Country: India
- Language: Hindi
- Budget: ₹40 crore
- Box office: ₹126.55 crore

Krrish (Hindi pronunciation: [krɪʃ]) is a 2006 Indian Hindi-language superhero action thriller film directed and produced by Rakesh Roshan. The film stars Hrithik Roshan in the main dual lead role, alongside Priyanka Chopra, Naseeruddin Shah, Rekha, Sharat Saxena and Manini Mishra. It is the second instalment in the Krrish franchise and a sequel to Koi... Mil Gaya. In the film, Krishna Mehra, who has superhuman abilities like his father Rohit Mehra, falls in love with Priya and follows her to Singapore, where he takes on the superhero persona of Krrish and sets out to thwart the plans of the evil scientist Dr. Siddhant Arya, who is creating a supercomputer which shows the future.

Krrish was conceived to be a film of global significance and a trendsetter in Indian cinema, with VFX on par with those from Hollywood. To that end, the effects team was aided by Marc Kolbe and Craig Mumma and the action scenes were choreographed by Tony Ching. The music was composed by Rajesh Roshan, while the background score was composed by Salim–Sulaiman. Filming was done to a large extent in Singapore as well as India.

Krrish was released on 23 June 2006 at a budget of ₹40 crore and, on over 1000 prints both near-record amounts for an Indian film at the time. The film received positive reviews from critics and received a record opening week at the box office. A blockbuster, Krrish grossed a worldwide total of ₹126 crore, becoming the second highest-grossing Indian film of 2006, behind Dhoom 2. The film received 8 nominations at the 52nd Filmfare Awards, including Best Film, Best Director (Rakesh), Best Actor (Hrithik) and Best Supporting Actress (Rekha) and won 3 awards, including Best Special Effects. At the 8th IIFA Awards, the film received 9 nominations, and won 3 awards, including Best Actor (Hrithik). It also won the National Film Award for Best Special Effects.

Krrish marked a significant turning point in Indian cinema, as it helped pioneer the mainstream superhero genre in Indian cinema and set a new benchmark for visual effects in Indian films. It has become the highest grossing Indian superhero film at the time of its release. It was one of the first Indian productions to integrate large-scale CGI and wire-work stunts comparable to international standards. The film was envisioned to be a genre-defining spectacle that could appeal to both Indian and global audiences, blending science fiction, romance, action, and mythology. The third film in the series, Krrish 3 was released in 2013 whereas, the fourth installment was expected to begin shooting in early 2026. But is undergoing hiatus because of scheduling concerns.

== Plot ==
Krishna Mehra, the orphaned son of the late Dr. Rohit and Nisha, lives with his grandmother Sonia in Kasauli. When his school principal suspects that Krishna has inherited Rohit's superhuman abilities, Sonia takes him to a remote village in Himachal Pradesh to conceal his identity.

Twenty years later, Krishna meets Priya and Honey, two holidaymakers camping near his home. After he saves Priya from a hang-gliding accident, they become friends and grow close. Before leaving, the girls witness some of his extraordinary abilities. Back in Singapore, they lose their jobs for taking an extended holiday. Honey suggests inviting Krishna to Singapore and producing a television programme about him to regain their positions. Sonia initially objects, fearing that people will exploit his powers, but eventually allows Krishna to go after he promises not to reveal them. She also tells him about his father, as she recognises his feelings for Priya.

Rohit had become a renowned scientist, married Nisha and worked with Dr. Siddhant Arya to develop a supercomputer capable of predicting future calamities. On the night Krishna was born, Rohit informed his colleagues that he was leaving the project and returning home, but was reportedly killed in a laboratory accident. Nisha died shortly afterwards.

In Singapore, Krishna befriends Kristian Li, a stunt performer struggling to raise money for his younger sister's surgery. Kristian invites Krishna and his friends to the Great Bombay Circus, where a firework ignites the tent and traps several children. Krishna rescues them after adopting the disguise of a black clown's mask and an inside-out jacket, becoming the mysterious hero Krrish. When offered a reward, he asks Kristian to impersonate him so that Kristian can pay for his sister's operation.

Priya and Honey discover Krishna's secret through footage recorded on Priya's videocamera and decide to release it to make Krrish famous. Krishna overhears their conversation and leaves heartbroken, believing Priya intends to exploit him. Before Priya can confess her genuine love for him, he departs. After confronting him, Priya learns about the Mehra family's tragic past and attempts to prevent her boss from exposing Krrish's identity.

Priya subsequently meets Vikram Sinha, Dr. Arya's senior security officer, who has spent twenty years searching for Krishna and Sonia. Sinha reveals that Rohit is alive and explains that he and Rohit were close friends. During the supercomputer's initial test, they witnessed Krishna's birth and discovered Arya holding Rohit at gunpoint. Realising that Arya intended to use the machine for his own purposes, Rohit destroyed it, but Arya shot him. As the computer requires Rohit's heartbeat and retinal scans to operate, Arya has kept him in a comatose state while rebuilding it.

After reconstructing the computer, Arya consults it and sees a vision of Krrish killing him. He visits Kristian and shoots him dead. Learning of Kristian's death, Krishna dons his Krrish disguise and uses his superhuman speed to pursue Arya to his remote island, where Rohit is imprisoned. Arya consults the computer again but sees that the predicted future remains unchanged.

Krrish enters the compound and defeats Arya's henchmen, but Arya shoots Sinha dead and takes Priya and Rohit hostage. Krrish rescues them and fatally injures Arya. He then reveals to Rohit that Krishna is his son. Krishna and Priya return to India with Rohit, reuniting him with Sonia. Rohit uses the supercomputer, originally developed with his late father, to send signals into space in the hope of contacting Jadoo. As the family expresses its gratitude to Jadoo, all four witness a spaceship in the night sky.

== Cast ==
- Hrithik Roshan in a dual role as:
  - Krishna Mehra / Krrish, Rohit and Nisha's son; Sonia's grandson and Priya's love-interest
    - Mickey Dhamejani as Teen Krishna
  - Dr. Rohit Mehra, Sonia's son; Nisha's widower and Krishna's father
- Priyanka Chopra as Priya Kalyanan, Krishna's love-interest
- Naseeruddin Shah as Dr. Siddhant Arya, an evil scientist; Rohit's former accomplice turned enemy
- Rekha as Sonia Mehra, Rohit's mother and Krishna's grandmother
- Sharat Saxena as Vikram Sinha, Dr. Arya's employee, Rohit's trusted colleague, Mehra family's well-wisher and Krishna's helper to eliminate Dr. Arya
- Manini Mishra as Honey, Priya's best-friend and colleague
- Hemant Pandey as Bahadur, Krishna's friend
- Ahmad Khan as Dr. Mathur, Dr. Arya's assistant
- Bin Xia as Kristian Li, Krishna's friend
- Edgar Noordanus
- Zain Khan as Chintu, Krishna's little friend
- Fardeen Hussaini as Krishna's little friend
- Yu Xuan as Kristian's sister

=== Special appearances ===
- Puneet Issar as Komal Singh, Priya's camp leader
- Akash Khurana as Father Robericks, Principal of the Catholic School
- Mithilesh Chaturvedi as Mr. Mathur, Rohit's former computer teacher
- Archana Puran Singh as Nayantara, Priya and Honey's boss
- Kiran Juneja as Amisha Kalyanan, Priya's mother
- Preity Zinta as Nisha Mehra, Rohit's wife and Krishna's mother

== Production ==
=== Development ===
In November 2004, the Roshans confirmed they would produce a sequel to Koi... Mil Gaya (2003). They announced that actors Hrithik Roshan and Rekha would return for the sequel, but that Preity Zinta would be replaced by Priyanka Chopra. Chopra also confirmed the same, adding, "The story will start where Koi... Mil Gaya ended." Before Chopra, Amrita Rao was cast as the female lead, and she and Hrithik starred in a photoshoot. However, the results of the photoshoot left Rakesh Roshan dissatisfied, and thus Rao was removed from the project. Rakesh Roshan hoped that the film would be remembered as the first to prove that the Indian film industry is equal to Hollywood. He decided to push the story forward by focusing on the son of the previous films's protagonist, who would inherit his father's special abilities. The story combined elements of Indian mythology (the main character's name Krishna alludes to the Hindu Lord Krishna), Chinese martial arts and Hollywood films to set itself up as a film of global significance.

=== Pre-production ===
Rakesh Roshan wanted Krrish to be a trendsetter in Indian cinema, with visual effects on par with Hollywood films. He hired Hollywood special effects experts Marc Kolbe and Craig Mumma, who had both previously worked on such films as Independence Day, Godzilla and Sky Captain, to help create the visual effects for the film. Roshan also hired Hong Kong action director Tony Ching after admiring his work in Hero. Before production began, Hrithik Roshan went to China to train with Ching for the cable work that would be needed to make his character "fly". A storyboard of the film was prepared and sent to Ching to help him develop the action sequences. Additional production credits include: Farah Khan – choreographer, Samir Chanda and Sham Kaushal – art directors, Baylon Fonesca and Nakul Kamte – sound, Nahush Pise – makeup artist, Sham Kaushal – assistant action director.

=== Filming ===
Krrish was the first Indian film to be shot in Singapore under the Singapore Tourism Board's Film-in-Singapore subsidy scheme, and over 60% of the film was shot there. Shooting was accomplished on location over a span of 2 months, from September to November 2005. Locations featured included the Singapore Zoo, the Gateway building, and the Singapore National Library. Another major filming location was Robinson Road, where heavy rains caused production delays. The Singapore police were on location to block roads and protect the filming equipment, such as when the film's action scenes required two 250-foot high industrial cranes. Author Audrey Yue noted that the film shoot benefited Singapore by leading to domestic and Indian film-induced tourism.

Filming also took place in Manali and Film City in Mumbai. During filming of a flying stunt, one of the wires that was tied to Hrithik Roshan broke, causing him to fall 50 feet, though he landed safely on a shop's canopy. Hrithik described the incident as a "freak accident", stating, "I was skydiving to my death till I fell on a six-feet-long canopy of a shop that was out because of the slight drizzle. The canopy had iron rods. But I missed those rods too. What do I say? I guess the right word to describe the situation would be jadoo (magic)." Roshan also suffered other injuries during the film's production. He tore the hamstring in his right leg during a circus scene, singed his hair while running through fire in another action scene, and broke his thumb and toe during strenuous training for the wirework.

=== Post-production ===
Indian firm Prasad EFX assigned a team of more than 100 VFX specialists to work with Marc Kolbe and Craig Mumma to create the visual effects for the film. Included were sophisticated 3D modelling and computer animation, including whole body scans, 3D replicas of vehicles, fire sequences, complicated wire removals and compositing work. They prepared over 1,200 VFX shots, accounting for approximately 90 minutes of screen time. Describing the effects, Rakesh Roshan stated, "If you liked the visual effects in Koi... Mil Gaya, you will find them far better in Krrish. I do not think audiences have seen anything like this in Hindi films."

== Music ==
The film's soundtrack, composed by Rajesh Roshan, was released on 28 April 2006 by T-Series. Lyricists included Ibraheem Ashk, Nasir Faraaz, and Vijay Akela. Salim–Sulaiman provided the background score. It became the seventh best-selling Bollywood soundtrack of the year.

== Marketing ==
As a part of the marketing, Merchandise was offered for sale prior to the film's release to maximize profits. These included action figures, masks, and other toys.

A Krrish game was made in 2006 by Indiagames after the release of Krrish.

== Release ==
=== Theatrical ===
The final budget of Krrish came to ₹40 crore, which at that time was considered a big-budget film by Hindi film standards. The film was released on 23 June 2006 with 1,000 prints. Krrish was simultaneously released along with dubbed versions in Tamil and Telugu languages. It was the first Indian film to receive payments in advance for product placement, music, and international distribution rights.

=== Home media ===
The film's DVD was released in Region 1 on 18 August 2006, by Adlabs. On 21 August 2006, it was released for all regions by Filmkraft. Adlabs also released a Blu-ray version.

=== Film festivals ===
It was also notably screened under the "Informative Screening (Feature)" film category at the 2014 Pyongyang International Film Festival in North Korea.

== Reception ==
=== Box office ===
Krrish had a good opening week, and tickets were reportedly selling for many times the original cost at some locations. Total gross collections were an Indian record of ₹41.6 crore (₹29.7 crore in profit) for its opening week. Krrish became the fourth-highest-grossing film of 2006, earning over ₹69 crore nett in India alone, and was classified as a "Blockbuster" by Box Office India. It also grossed ₹31.68 crore in the overseas market, where it was declared a "hit". The final worldwide total gross was ₹126 crore. One week after Krrish was released, another superhero film, Superman Returns was released in India. Rakesh Roshan stated, "I was a little skeptical that Superman might hurt me, but fortunately it didn't." In fact, Krrish fared better at the box office in India than Superman Returns did.

=== Critical response ===
On the review aggregator website Rotten Tomatoes, 88% of 8 critics' reviews are positive, with an average rating of 7/10.

==== India ====
Krrish received positive reviews from critics in India. Taran Adarsh of Bollywood Hungama believed that the film surpassed expectations, but felt that there were issues with pacing in first hour. Overall, he deemed Krrish to be "a terrifically exciting and compelling experience", and awarded the film 4.5 of 5 stars. Nikhat Kazmi noted in The Times of India that while the superhero and action sequences were appealing, there were not enough of them. He was also not excited by the romantic parts, comparing them to a sightseeing tour, first in India and then in Singapore. He said that overall, this film lacks the fun of its predecessor. On the other hand, Raja Sen said that Krrish was infinitely better than KMG, though ultimately it was all about Hrithik Roshan. Sen and Sukanya Verma, writing for Rediff, both gave the film 3 out of 5 stars, and both said that it was a good film for children. Sen summarised, "So, is it a good superhero movie? No, but it's well-intentioned. It's a full-on kiddie movie, and while a lot of us might be scornful of Krrish, it's heartening to see fantasy officially entering mainstream Bollywood." Verma agreed with other critics that it took too long for the action to get started, and said that a lot of attention was spent showing off Roshan's muscles. He summarised, "Krrish neither has the sleek aura nor the deep-rooted ideology of superheroes. What it does have is a super-spirited performance from Hrithik Roshan, which is likely to appeal to children. And that's worth a three-star cheer." Saibal Chatterjee wrote in the Hindustan Times that Krrish is a hackneyed, formulaic masala film, with special effects added on top, and hoped that this would not be the future of Bollywood. Rajeev Masand of CNN-IBN condemned the screenplay and thought that the only thing that made the film watchable was the acting of Hrithik Roshan. He gave the film only 2 out of 5 stars, saying "Krrish is only an average film that could have been so much better if the makers had concentrated as hard on its story as they did on its action and stunts."

==== Overseas ====
Overseas reviews were positive. Richard James Havis of The Hollywood Reporter stated, "This Bollywood epic crunches together romance, comedy, extraterrestrials, martial arts, dancing and action to tell an entertaining story about a reluctant Indian superhero" but said it may be "far too crazed for foreign viewers". David Chute of LA Weekly deemed it a "hearty pulp cinema that really sticks to your ribs". Likewise, Laura Kern of The New York Times said it was a blend of carefree romance, show-stopping action and sci-fi. Ronnie Scheib of Variety said that it was an "enjoyable, daffily improbable escapist romp". He praised the action sequences as ingeniously choreographed, but very family-friendly. Though Jaspreet Pandohar of BBC was critical of the script for being "low on originality", he praised Hrithik Roshan's performance and the action scenes. Dr. P.V. Vaidyanathan, in a review for BBC Shropshire, said that the film's excellent special effects were as good as the best from Hollywood, praised Hrithik's acting, but called the music mundane.

=== Accolades ===
Krrish was one of India's possible nominations for the 2007 Academy Award for Best Foreign Film, but the country ultimately chose Rang De Basanti as its pick. Despite this, Krrish won numerous awards, including 3 Filmfare Awards—Best Special Effects, Best Action and Best Background Score—and was nominated for Best Film, Best Director, Best Actor, Best Supporting Actress and Best Villain at the 52nd Filmfare Awards. At the 2007 IIFA Awards, Krrish won Best Actor, Best Action, and Best Special Effects. Rakesh Roshan won the Creative Person of the Year title at the same ceremony. Additionally, the film was nominated in the following categories at the ceremony: Best Director, Best Music and Best Story.

Hrithik Roshan won other acting awards that year, including the Star Screen Award Best Actor, Zee Cine Award for Best Actor – Male, BFJA – Best Actor Award (Hindi) and GIFA Best Actor. The film's special effects won the National Film Award for Best Special Effects. The film also took Best Picture honours at the Matri Shree Media Awards.

52nd Filmfare Awards:

Won

- Best Background Score – Salim–Sulaiman
- Best Special Effects – EFX
- Best Action – Tony Ching & Siu-Tung

Nominated

- Best Film – Rakesh Roshan
- Best Director – Rakesh Roshan
- Best Actor – Hrithik Roshan
- Best Supporting Actress – Rekha
- Best Villain – Naseeruddin Shah
- Best Sound Design – Jeetendra Choudhary, Baylon Fonsecai & Nakul KamrE

== Sequel ==
After the success of Krrish, Rakesh Roshan announced that he would be making a sequel, tentatively titled Krrish 3. He confirmed that Hrithik Roshan and Priyanka Chopra would reprise their roles, and that the antagonists would be played by Vivek Oberoi and Kangana Ranaut.

== See also ==
- List of Indian superhero films
- Science fiction films in India
