= Insan Jaag Utha =

1959 film by Shakti Samanta

- Theatrical release poster
- Directed by: Shakti Samanta
- Written by: Nabendu Ghosh (screenplay); Vrajendra Gaur (dialogue)
- Story by: Saroj Mitra
- Produced by: Shakti Samanta
- Starring: Madhubala; Sunil Dutt; Nasir Hussain; Bipin Gupta; Madan Puri
- Cinematography: Chandu
- Edited by: Dharamvir
- Music by: Sachin Dev Burman; Shailendra (lyrics)
- Release date: 14 April 1959
- Country: India
- Language: Hindi

Insān Jaag Utha (lit. 'Mankind has awoken') is a 1959 Hindi-language social drama film, produced and directed by Shakti Samanta, and written by Nabendu Ghosh and Vrajendra Gaur, based on a story by Saroj Mitra. The film stars Madhubala, Sunil Dutt, Nasir Hussain, Bipin Gupta and Madan Puri in lead roles. It has music by Sachin Dev Burman, with lyrics by Shailendra.

== Plot ==
Gauri lives in a small village in India with her crippled ex-army-man and freedom fighter dad, Laxmandas, and a younger brother, Gulab, and makes a living working as a laborer. One day she notices a man lurking around their house, this man subsequently introduces himself as Ranjeet, who has just arrived from Bombay. Ranjeet and Gauri become friends after he treats a wound on Gauri's foot, and then both fall in love with each other. Ranjeet starts working for the Government which is in the process of building a dam, where Gauri also works. Ranjeet starts work as a laborer also, but is subsequently promoted as a crane operator. What Gauri and Laxmandas do not know is that Ranjeet is in this village for a reason - greed for the suitcase of gold that he himself had buried in Gauri's front-yard - the very same gold that he was caught smuggling five years ago and the very same gold that he had spent five years in prison for.

== Cast ==
- Madhubala as Gauri
- Sunil Dutt as Ranjeet
- Nazir Hussain as Laxmandas
- Bipin Gupta as Minister
- Madan Puri as Mohan Singh
- Minoo Mumtaz as Muniya
- Sundar as Sukham
- Gautam Mukherjee as Police officer
- Mauji Singh in the song (Baharon Se Nazaro Ke Dekho)
- Praveen Paul as Hotel Owner
- Nishi as Hamsa / Riny
- Keshav Rana as Robert
- Shyam Kumar as Chander
- Kundan as Bahadur

== Production ==
It was a tiring yet refreshing experience to get so close to nature and witness the lives of hundreds of people who are helping to build the new India.

— Madhubala on working in Insan Jaag Utha,

Early in his career, Samanta had directed only crime thrillers including Inspector (1956) and Howrah Bridge (1958). A few days after the success of Howrah Bridge (1958), which was directed and also produced by him, he began working on Insān Jaag Utha. Insān Jaag Utha was a film with social and patriotic themes, and this was an attempt by Samanta to shift to making social films. A large part of the film was shot on location at the Nagarjuna Saagar Dam, and the whole crew stayed in several guest rooms situated near the dam.

== Soundtrack ==
Insaan Jaag Utha

Soundtrack album by S.D. Burman
- Released: 1959 (India)
- Genre: Film soundtrack
- Length: 21:00
- Language: Hindi
- Label: His Master's Voice
- Producer: S.D. Burman

S.D. Burman chronology
Kaagaz Ke Phool (1959)	Insaan Jaag Utha (1959)	Manzil (1960)

The soundtrack of the film was composed by S. D. Burman, with lyrics by Shailendra. It is noted for the duet Jaanu Jaanu Ri sung by Asha Bhosle and Geeta Dutt, which was shot on location at the under-construction Nagarjuna Sagar Dam.

All lyrics are written by Shailendra; all music is composed by S.D. Burman.

Songs
No.	Title	Singer(s)	Length
1.	"Ankhen Char Hote Hote Ho Gaya Pyar"	Asha Bhosle	3:41
2.	"Baat Badti Gai Khel Khel Men"	Asha Bhosle	3:40
3.	"Insaan Jaag Utha"	Asha Bhosle	3:48
4.	"Ye Chanda Rus Ka Na Ye Japan Ka"	Mohammed Rafi	3:06
5.	"Chand Sa Mukhda Kyon Sharmaya"	Asha Bhosle and Mohammed Rafi	3:28
6.	"Jaanu Jaanu Ri"	Asha Bhosle and Geeta Dutt	3:28
Total length:			21:00

== Release ==
The film premiered at Roxy Cinema, Bombay, on 15 May 1959.

== Reception ==
=== Critical reception ===
A Times of India review, dated 17 May 1959, carried the headline: "Shakti's Insan Jaag Utha: A Creditable Achievement".

The film was also reviewed in Hindustan Times on 23 May 1959.

Retrospectively, Shoma A. Chatterjee of Upperstall found the film's storyline to be "powerful" and its songs to be "beautiful". Filmfare had mentioned Madhubala's performance as Gauri in the film among her best performances.

=== Box office ===
Insan Jaag Utha was reportedly popular with audience. However, since the film was made on a big budget, its earning brought Samanta only a little profit. In an interview he gave several years after the film's release, he recalled Insān Jaag Utha as a "mediocre success".

Discouraged by the little box-office returns of Insan Jaag Utha, Samanta shifted back to make entertainment-oriented, crime films for another decade, beginning with the highly successful Jaali Note (1960), before attempting the socially relevant film genre with films like Aradhana (1969), Kati Patang (1971) and Amar Prem (1971).
