= Adhikar (1986 film) =

1986 film directed by Vijay Sadanah

- Poster
- Directed by: Vijay Sadanah
- Screenplay by: Kulwant Jani and Vijay Kaul
- Produced by: Jawaharlal Bafna; Vasant Doshi
- Starring: Rajesh Khanna; Tina Munim; Zarina Wahab; Bindu; Sulochana Latkar; Raza Murad; Paintal; Tanuja; Danny Denzongpa; Vikas Anand; Lucky; Yunus Parvez
- Music by: Bappi Lahiri
- Release date: 25 April 1986
- Country: India
- Language: Hindi

Adhikar (transl. Right) is a 1986 Indian Hindi-language film starring Rajesh Khanna and Tina Munim. It is about the struggles of a father to bring up his child after the rich mother has walked out of their life. The film was a remake of Pakistani film Qurbani (1981).

In 1992, Ram Awatar Agnihotri wrote that it was in the films Alag Alag and Adhikar, both opposite Rajesh Khanna that Tina Munim showed the "first sparks" of the dedicated actress she had become. Tina regards her performance in this film as her career best. This was the last film to feature Rajesh Khanna and Tina Munim onscreen together.

== Plot ==
Vishal is a former champion jockey. Due to failing health, his doctor has advised him to give up racing, which he does. He lives in a small house with his young son, Lucky. Both of them lead a humble lifestyle, yet they love each other dearly. Lucky grows up to believe that his mother has died, and when he asks Vishal about his mother, it is revealed that Vishal fell in love with a wealthy girl called Jyoti during his days as a champion jockey. Jyoti and Vishal marry and live together. Jyoti is an excellent singer and some music directors offer her the chance to sing in their films. However, Vishal is adamant that Jyoti will remain a housewife, and look after their son. When Jyoti sneaks off to the recording studio when Lucky is ill, Vishal furiously drags her home and hits her. He firmly tells her that she shall have to choose between singing and being a wife. This causes Jyoti to leave her house and move in with her selfish mother. Although she takes Lucky with her, Vishal kidnaps him and it's also revealed that Jyoti and her family informed the police, causing Vishal to move far away with Lucky to a smaller house.

Jyoti, now a very successful singer, re-enters Lucky's life as his 'aunty'. Vishal works as a servant in a wealthy man's house. His boss's spoilt sister, Rita takes an interest in Vishal and is determined to marry him. When Rita visits Vishal's house, Lucky does not like her and he misbehaves with her, causing Rita to run away. When his boss demands that Lucky beg Rita for forgiveness, Vishal quits his job. Lucky, unaware that Jyoti is his mother, plans to introduce her to Vishal. This leads to Jyoti realising that Lucky is her son, but Vishal firmly tells her to stay away.

Jyoti takes Vishal to court for a custody hearing. In order to pay for a good lawyer, Vishal is forced to sell Lucky's horse, Hira to his former boss. However, Vishal meets with an accident and misses the first day in court. The court orders that Jyoti be permitted to meet Lucky once a week. When Vishal finds Lucky at Jyoti's house, he takes him away, telling him that Jyoti plans to separate them, leading Lucky to sever ties with Jyoti, shattering her.

During the custody hearing, Vishal's lawyer tears Jyoti apart on the stand. Unable to tolerate his wife's insult, Vishal emotionally agrees to hand Lucky over to Jyoti. This makes Jyoti fall in love with Vishal again and she quits singing, and decides to return to Vishal. One day, Lucky sees Vishal's boss abuse Hira, and as he begs him to stop, Vishal arrives and beats his boss up, which leads to his arrest. Lucky is sent to live with Jyoti, who reveals to him that she is his mother, but he doesn't believe her.

When Vishal is released from jail, Lucky asks him to participate in a horse race, atop Hira, whom Jyoti has brought back. Vishal reluctantly agrees and wins the race. However, this makes Vishal unconscious. In his last moments, Vishal tells Lucky that their journey together was only meant to last until this point. Vishal loses consciousness again. However, Lucky's prayers bring him back. Vishal confirms that Jyoti, who is also there, is indeed Lucky's mother. Vishal shares an emotional embrace with Lucky and Jyoti. The film ends with Jyoti, Vishal and Lucky leading a happy family life together.

== Cast ==
- Rajesh Khanna as Vishal
- Tina Munim as Jyoti
- Zarina Wahab as Rita
- Bindu as Jyoti's Mother
- Sulochana Latkar as Mausi Ji
- Danny Denzongpa as Kudeshwar Negi Vishal's Lawyer
- Tanuja as Advocate
- Raza Murad as J.K.
- Murad as Judge
- Yunus Parvez as Baake mama, Baakelal
- Chand Usmani as Doctor
- Vikas Anand as Doctor Sharma
- Paintal as Mohanlal, Music Director
- Praveen Kumar Sobti
- Moolchand
- Birbal as Ganeshan, Jyoti's Servant
- Gurbachan Singh

== Music ==
- "Main Dil Tu Dhadkan" – Kishore Kumar
- "Shuru Shuru Pyar Ki Kahani" – Kishore Kumar, Chandrani Mukherjee
- "Jane Wale Na Dil Se Jate" – Lata Mangeshkar
- "Main Dil Tu Dhadkan" – Kavita Krishnamurthy
- "Jeene Ka Sahara Milgayai" – Uttara Kelkar
- "Laher Laher Chanchal Huyee" – Anupama Deshpande
