= She's No Angel =

2001 television film by Rachel Feldman

- Based on: I Married a Dead Man by Cornell Woolrich
- Written by: Rachel Feldman
- Directed by: Rachel Feldman
- Starring: Tracey Gold; Kevin Dobson; Dee Wallace
- Music by: Richard Bowers; Steve Pierson
- Country of origin: United States
- Original language: English

Production
- Producers: Pierre David; Ken Sanders; Noël A. Zanitsch; Anita Gershman
- Cinematography: Steve Adcock
- Editor: Frederick Wardell
- Running time: 90 minutes

Original release
- Network: Lifetime Television
- Release: March 4, 2001

She's No Angel is a 2001 television film directed and written by Rachel Feldman, a remake of the 1950 film No Man of Her Own, loosely based on the novel I Married a Dead Man by Cornell Woolrich.

== Plot ==
Donald (Kevin Dobson) and Maureen (Dee Wallace) are a married couple who get horrible news: their son was involved in a car accident and has died. Liddy (Tracey Gold), his wife, has never met Donald and Maureen. Despite that, they take her in, because she is all alone. They soon discover she is not an angel to live with.

== Cast ==
- Tracey Gold as Liddy Carlyle
- Kevin Dobson as Donald Shawnessy
- Dee Wallace as Maureen Shawnessy
- Cameron Bancroft as Jed Benton
- Jeffrey Meek as Jackie Furst
- Michelle Jones as Catherine Shawnessy
- Nathan Anderson as Sean Shawnessy
