= Nenjil Oru Mull =

- Poster
- Directed by: Mathi Oli Shanmugam
- Screenplay by: Mathi Oli Shanmugam
- Based on: Kati Patang by Gulshan Nanda
- Produced by: N. V. R. Raja
- Starring: Poornima Jayaraman; Pratap
- Cinematography: Ashok Gunjal
- Edited by: R. Devarajan
- Music by: G. K. Venkatesh
- Production company: Santosh Art Films
- Release date: 11 December 1981
- Country: India
- Language: Tamil

Nenjil Oru Mull (transl. A thorn in the heart) is a 1981 Indian Tamil-language thriller film written and directed by Mathi Oli Shanmugam. A remake of the Hindi film Kati Patang (1971), which in turn was based on the 1948 novel I Married a Dead Man by Cornell Woolrich, it stars Poornima Jayaraman and Pratap. The film was released on 11 December 1981 and failed at the box office.

== Cast ==
- Poornima Jayaraman as Madhavi / Radha
- Pratap
- Sivachandran
- Calcutta Viswanathan
- V. K. Ramasamy
- Mathi Oli Shanmugam as the bar manager

== Production ==
Nenjil Oru Mull is the first Tamil film for Poornima Bhagyaraj (née Jayaraman). The film is a remake of the Hindi film Kati Patang (1971), which in turn was based on the 1948 novel I Married a Dead Man by Cornell Woolrich. It was predominantly filmed in Coimbatore. One shot required Poornima to run on an overpass. Cinematography was handled by Ashok Gunjal, and editing by R. Devarajan.

== Soundtrack ==
The soundtrack was composed by G. K. Venkatesh. This is the debut film for lyricist Ponnadiyan.

Track listing
No.	Title	Lyrics	Singer(s)	Length
1.	"Raagam"	Pulamaipithan	S. P. Sailaja, Deepan Chakravarthy	4:30
2.	"My Name"	M. G. Vallabhan	Vani Jairam	4:00
3.	"Neragave"	Pulamaipithan	Vani Jairam, Deepan Chakravarthy	4:20
4.	"Sorgama"	Pulamaipithan	Malaysia Vasudevan	4:09
5.	"Therodum Veedhi"	Ponnadiyan	B. S. Sasirekha	4:12
Total length:				21:11

== Release and reception ==
Nenjil Oru Mul was released on 11 December 1981. Nachi of Pesum Padam said this thorn does not prick the heart but feels pleasant, calling the film watchable. Despite this, it failed commercially.
