= Deedar-E-Yaar =

1982 film by H. S. Rawail

- Theatrical release poster
- Directed by: H. S. Rawail
- Written by: Dr. Rahi Masoom Reza (dialogues); Indeevar; Kaifi Azmi; Sahir Ludhianvi; Ameer Meenai (lyrics)
- Screenplay by: Rahul Rawail
- Story by: Ruhi Rawail; Rahul Rawail
- Produced by: Prasan Kapoor; Jeetendra (Presents)
- Starring: Jeetendra; Rishi Kapoor; Rekha; Tina Munim
- Cinematography: G.Singh
- Edited by: Shyam
- Music by: Laxmikant-Pyarelal
- Production company: Tirupati Pictures Enterprises
- Release date: 22 October 1982
- Running time: 169 minutes
- Country: India
- Language: Hindi

Deedar-E-Yaar is a 1982 Hindi-language romance film, produced by Prasan Kapoor under the Tirupati Pictures Enterprises banner and directed by Harnam Singh Rawail. It stars Jeetendra, Rishi Kapoor, Rekha, Tina Munim and music composed by Laxmikant-Pyarelal. The film was a box office failure.

== Plot ==
Javed Sayeed Ali Khan meets Sikander Alam Changezi, who is the brother of Firdous Changezi. Javed loves Firdous and he gives a love letter to Firdous in Sikander's hand, not knowing that he is her brother. He asks Javed to stay away from his sister, but Javed ignores the warning and enters their home disguised as a servant. Firdous recognizes him as he is leaving. He takes her photograph, but Firdous came to his home and takes the photo, and both fall in love. They are living in the city of Lucknow, where culture, courtesies, and the Nawabi way of life has remained its hallmark. Nawab Akhtar Nawaz Khan's sister Nazima's husband Jahang every day goes to Husna's Kotha and he decides to marry her. To save his sister's family from disaster, Akhtar frequents the Kotha of Husna. Jahang decides to kill Akhtar, but he fails. Javed saves him and they become friends. At the jewellery shop, Akhtar sees Firdous for the first time and he falls in love on one side, unaware of the fact, that Akhtar and Javed love the same girl and promise to help each other in winning their respective loves. Both meet her in a fair and Javed decides to marry Firdous. When they all came back to Lucknow, Ali Nawab Mirza Firhad Ali Changezi said to Javed that he can't marry Firdous because of his family. Then to help his friend Javed, Akhtar decides to marry Firdous, without knowing that Firdous is his lover and then divorce her, then Javed can marry her. Both are ready to do that. When Akhtar marries Javed's lady love, he discovers to his shock that she is none other than his lover. Here, Husna promises to Akhtar that after the marriage of Akhtar, she will leave dance in Kotha and commit suicide. After coming to know that Firdous is nothing but Javed's love and Akhtar also loves her, Akhtar tells Javed that he will not divorce Firdous. What happened to Javed? Can Javed get his lady love Firdous? Can Akhtar divorce Firdous?

== Cast ==
- Jeetendra as Nawab Akhtar Nawaz Khan
- Rekha as Husna Bai
- Rishi Kapoor as Javed Sayeed Ali Khan
- Tina Munim as Firdous Changezi
- Reena Roy as Qawalli singer (Friendly Appearance)
- Nirupa Roy as Mrs. Khan
- Deven Varma as Sikander Changezi
- Shreeram Lagoo as Nawab Mirza Changezi
- Urmila Bhatt as Mrs. Changezi

== Soundtrack ==
Music composed by Laxmikant-Pyarelal, lyrics written by Indeevar, Kaifi Azmi, Sahir Ludhianvi and Amir Meenai.

Song	Singer	Lyricist	Ref.
"Chala Chal Lifaafe Kabutar Ki Chaal"	Kishore Kumar	Sahir Ludhianvi and Kaifi Azmi	
"Sarakti Jaaye Hai Rukh Se Naqaab, Ahista Ahista"	Kishore Kumar, Lata Mangeshkar	Amir Meenai	
"Mere Dildaar Ka Baankpan, Allah Allah"	Kishore Kumar, Mohammed Rafi	Sahir Ludhianvi	
"Aaye Woh Phoolon Ke Rath Par"	Lata Mangeshkar	Indeevar	
"Tumko Dekha To Samajh Mein Aaya"	Lata Mangeshkar	Sahir Ludhianvi	
"Eid Ka Din Hai, Gale Aaj To Mil Le Zaalim"	Mohammed Rafi, Asha Bhosle, Chorus	Sahir Ludhianvi	
"Marne Ka Gham Nahin Hai"	Asha Bhosle	Kaifi Azmi	
"Jaana Jaana Jaldi Kya Hai"	Asha Bhosle	Kaifi Azmi	
