= Amit Khanna =

Indian film producer, director, writer and journalist

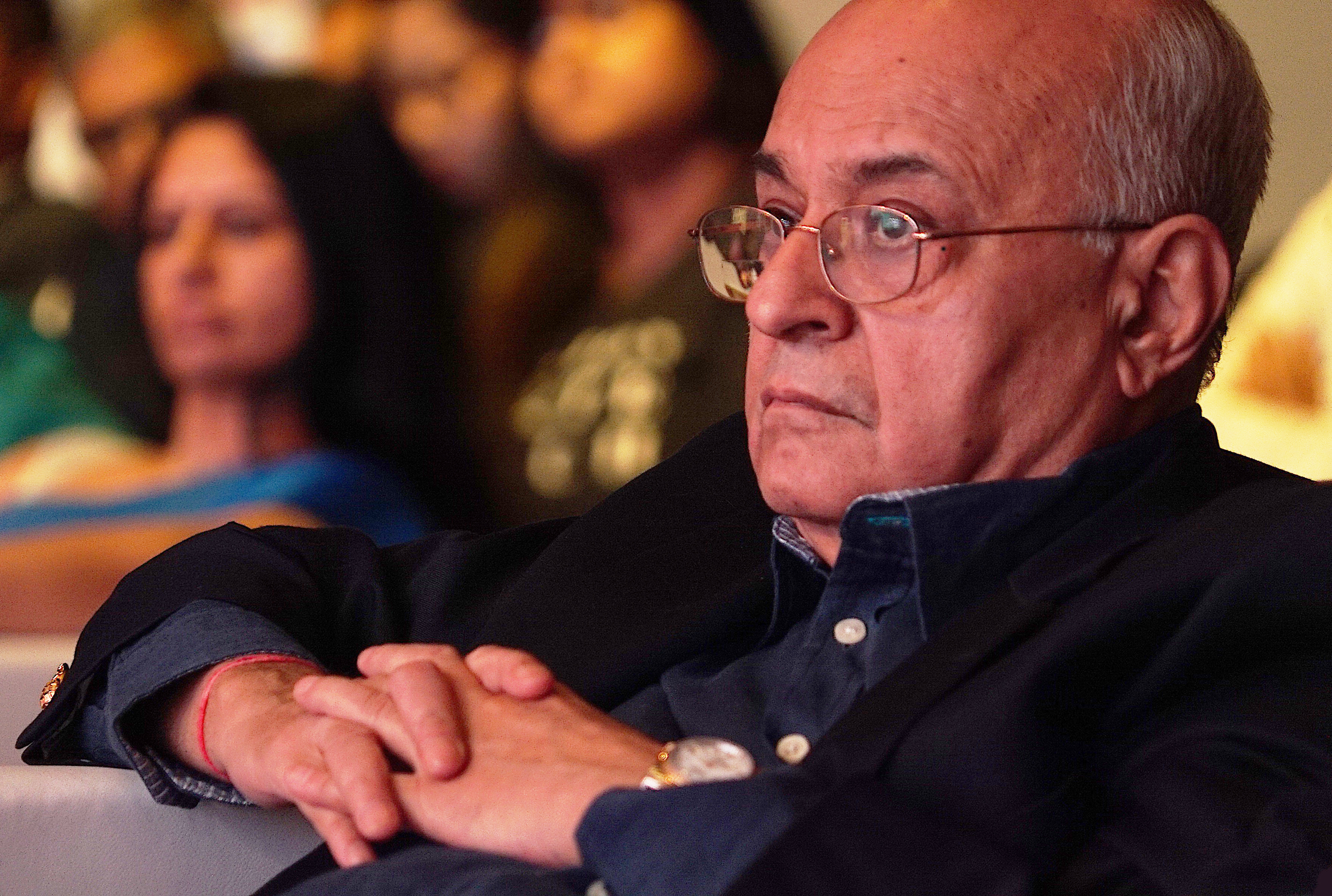
- Born: 1 March 1951 (age 75); Delhi, India
- Occupations: Film producer, lyricist, author, media executive
- Years active: 1971 - present
- Known for: Founder trustee of the Mumbai Academy of the Moving Image
- Notable work: Gudia, Sardari Begum, Bhairavi
- Parents: Jawaharlal Khanna (father); Hem Khanna (mother)
- Awards: 3 National Film Awards
- Website: amitkhanna.in

Amit Khanna is an Indian film producer, director, writer, and journalist. He was the founder chairman of Reliance Entertainment, former president of the Producers Guild of India, and the founder trustee of the Mumbai Academy of the Moving Image. He is credited with having coined the term Bollywood. Khanna has also won three National Film Awards as a producer and lyricist.

== Background ==
He completed his higher education from St. Stephen’s College, Delhi. He has been involved with media since his school days at St. Columba's School, Delhi and has worked in theatre, radio, television, journalism, and films. Khanna began his career as an executive producer with actor-producer Dev Anand’s Navketan Films in 1971 and subsequently produced films such as Man Pasand, Sheeshay Ka Ghar and Shesh. He has also written over 400 film and non-film songs and several film scripts. He began actively working in television as a producer-director in the eighties and set up Plus Channel in 1990 which was India’s first entertainment conglomerate and the largest independent producer of TV programmes. He left Plus as its Managing Director to launch Reliance Entertainment. His other achievements include editing the magazines Tempus and Take-2 and writing in various magazines and newspapers. He has served on the Central Board of Film Certification and the Film Import Selection Committee, as a vice president of the Film Producers Guild of India and has been on the committees of the Indian Broadcasting Foundation, Indian Music Industry and Film Federation of India. He helped found the Mumbai Academy of the Moving Image.

== Organisations ==
Amit Khanna is the only permanent member of the Council of Management of the Producers Guild of India (the two others were V. Shantaram and Raj Kapoor). He has participated as a keynote speaker for Federation of Indian Chambers of Commerce & Industry (FICCI), NASSCOM, Confederation of Indian Industries (CII), and ECO, and served on over 50 international government committees and trade organizations and institutions.

Year	Title	Organisation	Notes	Ref
1981	EC member	Film Federation of India (FFI)	Apex body of the Indian film industry.	
1982	Member	Radio & TV Advertising Practitioners Association		
1984	Member	Indian Documentary Producers Association (IDPA)		
1985–2000	Vice President	Association of Motion Picture & TV Program Producers	For 17 years.	
1988–1990	Governing Council member	Film and Television Institute of India, Pune		
1988–1990	Film Import Selection Committee member	Govt. of India		
1989–2000	Managing Director & Group Editor	PLUS Channel	India’s first integrated media entertainment conglomerate.	
1990–1994	Western Panel member	Central Board of Film Certification		
1990–1994	Appraisal Committee member	Ministry of Environment & Forest, Govt. of India		
1992–1995	Director	DSJ Communications		
1994–1996	Governing Council member	Satyajit Ray Film and Television Institute, Kolkata		
1997–2000	Advisory group member	Ministry of I&B, Govt. of India		
1999	Export Forum member	Ministry of I&B		
1999–2000	Member	Indian Broadcasting Foundation		
1999–2003	Advisory board director	Whistling Woods International film school, Mumbai		
1999–2003	National EC member, Entertainment Committee	FICCI		
1999–2010		US-India Business Alliance		
2000–2010	Chairman, Convergence Committee	FICCI		
2000–2012	Media committee member	US-India Business Council		
2000–2015	Chairman	Reliance Entertainment		
2001	Member	Indian Performing Rights Society		
2001–2004		All India Film Producers Council		
2001–2015	President	Earth Communications Office India Association	An environmental NGO.	
2002	Member, Expert Group of GATS	Ministry of Commerce, Govt. of India		
2005	Member, Prime Minister's Committee	Information, Communication & Entertainment (ICE)		
2005–2013	EC member	National committee of Media & Entertainment, CII		
2005–2015	Director	Reliance Big TV		
2005–2015	Director	Reliance MediaWorks		
		Indo European Centre		
	Founder trustee	Mumbai Academy of the Moving Image		
	Service Council member	Forum d'Avignon, Paris		
	President	Producers Guild of India	For three terms.	

== Writings ==
Presently retired from all film activities and organisational responsibilities, Amit Khanna devotes all his time solely to writing.

Year	Title	Book /newspaper /mag	Notes	Ref
1969–1971	Editor	Tempus	Monthly magazine	
1982	Editor & features writer	Take 2	Entertainment weekly	
1987–1989	Editorial Advisor	Probe India		
1990–1992		Business Plus	Video news magazine	
1990–1992		People Plus	Video news magazine	
1990–1992		Bollywood Plus	Video news magazine	
1990–2000	Syndicate features writer	Plus Newsbank		
1995–1997	Online Singapore			
1998–2015	Features writer	Outlook		
1993–1997	Syndicated columnist	(various national dailies)	Column name: Media Musing	
1997–2000	Editorial Adviser	The Economic Times		
1999–2000	Columnist	The Economic Times	Column name: Enterprise	
2002–2010	Columnist	Business Standard	Column name: Freeze Frame	
Jan 2013	Author	Anant Raag (Infinite Verse)	Anthology of poetry, published by HarperCollins	
Dec 2019	Author	Words Sounds Images: History of Media and Entertainment in India	Publisher: HarperCollins	
2017–present	Columnist	The Wire		
2018–present	Columnist	Open		
2018–present	Columnist	Bloomberg Quint		
	Co-author	Encyclopedia of Bollywood	Publisher: Encyclopædia Britannica	
		The Times of India		
		Hindustan Times		
		DNA		
	Features writer	The Illustrated Weekly of India		
	Features writer	India Today		
	Features writer	Filmfare		
	Features writer	Show Time		
	Features writer	Super Cinema		

== Filmography ==
Khanna started his film career as executive producer with Dev Anand's Navketan Films in 1971. In 1989 Khanna helped set up Plus Channel, a television programming house, and joined it as managing director and Group Editor. Under his tenure, the organization expanded its role to produce movies and music, and provide event management services. Several films created under the Plus Films banner went on to win National Film Awards. In 1996 Khanna won two awards as film producer at the 44th National Film Awards: Best Feature Film in Hindi for Gudia and Best Feature Film in Urdu for Sardari Begum. Plus Channel produced India's earliest audio books in both prose and verse. It also pioneered business news shows on Indian television.

In 2000 Khanna resigned from Plus Channel to join Reliance Entertainment where he served as chairman for 15 years. Under his guidance, Reliance Entertainment became a major player in Hollywood. In May 2008 the company signed deals to produce and develop movies with prominent Hollywood actors such as Tom Hanks, Brad Pitt, George Clooney, Jim Carrey and Nicolas Cage. In September 2008 Reliance Entertainment formed a joint venture with Steven Spielberg's DreamWorks SKG named DreamWorks Studios via an equity investment of $325 million. In August 2009 Reliance Entertainment signed an $825 million production and distribution deal with DreamWorks Studios.

=== Films ===
Year	Title	Role	Notes	References
1973	Shareef Budmaash	Executive producer		
1973	Heera Panna	production executive		
1974	Ishq Ishq Ishq	Executive producer		
1976	Bullet	Business executive and production controller		
1976	Chalte Chalte	Lyricist		
1976	Jaaneman	Business executive and production controller		
1977	Swami	Lyricist		
1978	Des Pardes	Executive producer and lyricist		
1980	Man Pasand	Producer and lyricist		
1980	Lootmaar	Executive producer		
1980	Saboot	Lyricist, EP and lyricist		
1980	Guest House	Lyricist		
1982	Shiv Charan	Lyricist		
1982	Star	Lyricist		
1984	Sheeshay Ka Ghar	Director, writer		
1984	Saaransh	Dialogue		
1984	Purana Mandir	Lyricist		
1984	Teri Baahon Mein	Lyricist		
1986	Aashiana	Director		
1986	Avinash	Lyricist		
1988	Shesh	Director		
1990	Awwal Number	Lyricist		
1994	1942: A Love Story	Script consultant		
1996	Aur Ek Prem Kahani	Producer		
1996	Bhairavi	Producer		
1996	Is Raat Ki Subah Nahin	Executive producer		
1996	Laalchee	Producer		
1996	Sardari Begum	Executive producer		
1996	Papa Kahte Hain	Producer		
1997	Do Rahain	Producer		
1997	Gudgudee	Executive producer		
1997	Saaz	Producer		
1997	Gudia	Producer		
1997	Agnichakra	Lyricist		
1997	Chakkar Pe Chakkar	Story		
2007	Hattrick	Lyricist		
2010	Malik Ek	Lyricist		

=== TV series ===
Year	Title	Role	Notes	References
1986	Buniyaad	Executive producer		
1986	Chhapte Chhapte	Executive producer		
1986	Apne Aap	Executive producer		
1995	A Mouthful of Sky	Producer	India's first English soap opera	
1995	Zameen Aasmaan	Producer		
1995–97	Swabhimaan	Producer	Episodes #1.1 to 1.498	
1996	Badalte Rishte	Producer		
1996	Mumkin	Producer		
1997	Ajeeb Dastaan Hai Yeh	Producer		
1997	Paltan	Producer		
1997	Kabhie Kabhie	Producer		
1997	Sab Golmaal Hai	Producer		

As a lyricist he has penned over 200 Hindi film songs, working mainly with music directors like Bappi Lahiri, Rajesh Roshan and Laxmikant–Pyarelal. He also composed lyrics for around 200 songs released in music albums by singers Nazia and Zoheb Hassan, Sharon Prabhakar, Salma Agha, Nusrat Fateh Ali Khan, Mahendra Kapoor and Shafqat Ali Khan. In 1984 he directed three music videos for Nazia Hassan's music album Young Tarang. He was the lyricist for the opening theme song of ten Indian television series, including Buniyaad (1986), Dekh Bhai Dekh (1993) and Swabhimaan (1995).

=== Other ===
Year	Title	Role		Programme /episode	References
1985	Young Tarang	Director	TV show	Rock music	
1996	Century of Cinema	Self	Docu	'And the Show Goes On: Indian Chapter'	

== Awards and honours ==
Time, Newsweek, Variety and The Hollywood Reporter have mentioned him as one of the global leaders of film and television. He has been a guest lecturer at New York University and the University of Southern California. He was on the selection panel of the Indian Panorama (Western region) thrice (1985, 1989, and 1993). and was the first Indian to serve on the International Emmys jury.

Year	Award	Organiser /festival	Notes	Ref
1976	Uttar Pradesh Film Journalist Association Award	UP Film Journalist Association		
1979	Cinegoers Award			
1980	Bengal Film Journalists' Association Award	Bengal Film Journalists Association		
1981	Uttar Pradesh Film Journalist Association Award	UP Film Journalist Association		
1986	Lions Club Award	Lions Club		
1987	Lifetime Achievement Award for Television	Uptron		
1995	Leadership Award	Indian Film Festival of Houston		
1996	National Film Award - Best Lyrics	Govt. of India	For Bhairavi	
1996	National Film Award - Best Hindi Film	Govt. of India	For Gudia	
1997	National Film Award - Best Urdu Film	Govt. of India	For Sardari Begum	
1997	TV Personality of the Year Award	Time magazine		
2010	Leadership Award	Indian Film Festival of Los Angeles (IFFLA)		
2010	Masterbrand Lifetime Achievement Award	CMO Council		
2015	Lifetime Achievement award for contribution to film and television	Norway Bollywood Festival		
2017	Film Critics Council Lifetime Award			
2017	PR Council of India Lifetime			
