= Jyoti Sarup =

Indian film director

Jyoti Sarup (born 20 August 1954 in New Delhi) is a National Award winning Indian film/serial director and producer, most known for directing the television series, Buniyaad, and films like Chorni (1982) and Bub (2001).

== Biography ==
An engineer from Govt Engineering College Ujjain, by education, he received a Diploma from NSD and FTII for Acting. He came to Mumbai (then Bombay) in 1978 to become an actor. Not belonging to a film background, he had to start from scratch. He started off as a Chief Assistant Director to Ramanand Sagar.

After acting in a few films & television serials and being the Chief Assistant to a few directors of that time, Atma Ram and Shakti Samanta, he found himself more suited behind the camera. He therefore started concentrating more on film and TV direction. His break as an individual director came from a telefilm with Shekhar Suman, and then he directed and acted in the Inspector Navin Mohan series of films, 90 minutes each with Navin Nischol and Mohan Gokhale, and the telefilm Sandhya Chhaya with Shriram Lagoo, Sulbha Deshpande etc.

This telefilm, Sandhya Chhaya, got him the lifetime chance for being the Episode Director of G. P. Sippy's famous TV serial Buniyaad. Since then he has directed around 38 projects, one of which has also got the prestigious National Film Award, thus becoming the first person to get a National Award for a Kashmiri Film, Bub. It was a Nargis Dutt Award for Best Feature Film on National Integration which was made after 38 years, in Kashmir.

He has also worked as the Head of the Production with Sony TV and brought it up from All India rating No. 9 to No. 2., and various other channels and production houses. He is an expert in live events and started this trend from "Lata Mangeshkar Live" when he was in Sony TV.

He has written few books too, one being on The Art of Acting, and another a fiction novel The KING of the film Jungle (published soon).

Recently, he has worked in two Oscar Award winning films, An Inconvenient Truth in which he edited the 96 minutes long film to 36 minutes, for Indian audiences, and he was the Dubbing Director of this film too, in Hindi. The Narrator of this film is Nobel Prize Winner Al Gore the Ex Vice-President of USA. He has also done two short films on Environment, Energising India and Toxic Trespass.

Now he is preparing for another TV Serial of 26 episodes, Deepak Phir Bhi Jalta Raha and after this directing a feature film. Then he is going to produce a feature film Ajaey, for his son Kuber Sarup, to be the Director.

== Awards ==
- 2002 National Award – Nargis Dutt Award for Best Feature Film on National Integration for the Kashmiri film Bub (2001)
- 11th All India Lions Club Award for Directing the groundbreaking Indian serial Buniyaad (1987)
- Indian Cine goers Award for directing the best Comedy serial of the year - Guldasta (1987)
- Indian Cine goers Award for best Soap Opera - Buniyaad (1986)
- Bombay Films Award for the best telefilm - Tadap (1986)

== Filmography ==
- Directing TV Serials, Short Films & Feature Films, (2002–14)
- Member of Jury for 51st, National Film Awards & 29th, RAPA Awards, (2004)
- Won a National Award for Directing a Feature Film, BUB (Kashmiri), (2001–03)
- Sr. Vice-President (TV) at Devgan Entertainment & Software Ltd. (2000–01)
- G. M. (Prod. & Programming), at Falak TV, an URDU Channel, (1988–99)
- Head of the Production Department, at Sony Entertainment TV, (1997–98)
- Independent director of Films and TV serials, (1984–97)
- Chief Asst. Director to Shri Ramanand Sagar, Atma Ram & Shakti Samanta, (1978–84)
- Bin Badal Barsaat (1963 film)

=== Director ===
- Yeh To Kamaal Ho Gaya: A detective comedy TV Serial, telecasted on DD Urdu, from 15th Aug 2014, daily on 7 PM, repeat on 10 PM, second repeat at 11.30 AM, next day from Monday to Friday. Based on the real cases of India.
- Kaam Chor: A comedy TV serial with social Message, for DD Urdu, shot in Jammu & Srinagar. Telecasted in May 2012.
- Kaala Sindoor: An TV serial, based on a true incidence, on Women Empowerment. Shot & Telecasted to DD, Telecasted in Oct’ 2011.
- Raj Tarangini (Serial, telecasted on DD Kashmir in 2006)
- Toxic Trespass (2005) (Climate Change Documentary, for a German NGO)
- Energising India (2004) (Climate Change Documentary, for a German NGO)
- Paye Na Rupiya Tratha (2003) (Serial)
- Bub (father) (2002) (First Feature Film in Kashmiri, after 38 years, won a National Award)
- Rani Ketki Ki Kahani (1997) (Short – Series)
- Parvarish (1996) (Serial on Zee TV)
- Sandhya Chhaya (1995) (Full length telefilm, Telecasted on DD Main)
- Tadap (1995) (Telefilm)
- Mausam Beiman (1993) (Telefilm)
- Naya Zaher (1991) (First Feature Film on AIDS)
- Darwazee (1991) (Serial)
- Aadhe Adhure Se Pure (1990) (Documentary on Jaipur foot)
- Ajeeb Itefaq (1989) (Telefilm)
- Guldasta (1987) (Serial)
- Buniyaad (1986–87) (Serial)
- Rehguzar (1985) (Telefilm)

Current assignments:

1. Deepak Phir Bhi Jalta Raha: A 26 episode, real story of Kashmir to be shot at Srinagar, Jammu, Pathankot, Dalhousie, Delhi & Bhopal, for a very popular channel.
2. Iccha Mrityu: A Feature Film written by Kuber Sarup & Jyoti Sarup.
3. Kissa Ramgadh Ka: A Feature film based on the farmers commuting suicides & solution to it, dealt in a humors way. Based on “Micro Insurance”, part of Micro Financing, the latest thing in India for Micro Insurance Academy, New Delhi.

=== Writer ===
- Ramlal Shyamlal (1978) (serial)
- Guldasta (1988) (serial)
- Aadhe Adhure Se Pure (1990) (documentary)
- Naya Zehar (1992) (feature film)
- Mausam Beiman (1993) (tele film)
- Ajeeb Itefaque (1994) (tele film)
- Tadap (1995) (tele film)
- Parvarish (1996) (serial)
- Bab (2002)
- Kala Sindoor (2011)
- Kaam Char (2012)
- Yeh to Kamaal Ho Gaya (2013)
- Iccha Mrityu (2013)

=== Producer ===
- Rani Ketki Ki Kahani (1997) (Short – Serial)
- Paye Na Rupiya Tratha (2003) (Serial)
- Emergising India (2004) (Documentary)
- Toxic Trespass (2005) (Documentary)
- Raj Tarangini (Serial telecasted in 2006, on DD Kashir)
- Kala Sindoor (2011)
- Kaam Char (2012)

=== Actor ===
- Ramlal Shyamlal (1978) ... property agent
- Tadap (1982) ... journalist
- Sir Richard Attenborough's "Gandhi" (1982) ... young Indian reporter
- Pyaar Ke Rahi (1982) ... Rakesh
- Rehguzar (1985) ... star's secretary
- Ajeeb Ittefaque (1989) ... Anil
- Mausam Beiman (1993) ... as himself
- Bub (father) (2002) ... guest appearance
- Castling (2004) ... Senior Inspector Verma
