= Virendra Razdan =

Indian actor

- Born: 6 March 1951; Srinagar, Kashmir, India
- Died: 13 June 2003 (aged 52); Mumbai, Maharashtra, India
- Occupation: Actor
- Years active: 1982–2003

Virendra Razdan (6 March 1951 – 13 June 2003) was an Indian actor. He is best known to international audiences for his portrayal of Maulana Azad, a leading figure of the Indian independence movement, in the 1982 biographical film Gandhi directed by Richard Attenborough.

== Early life ==
Virendra Razdan was born on 6 March 1951 to a middle class Brahmin family at Srinagar, Kashmir, India. His father Govind Razdan was a Sufi Musician. He aspired to become an actor and worked with few theatre groups in his teen age. He also served as Radio Jockey at Radio Kashmir during early 70’s. It was during 1972 at a mere age of 21 Years, he applied and was selected for a 3 Year Degree course into Acting and Theatre under the guidance of Dr. Ibrahim Alkazi at National School of Drama (NSD) & one year Diploma (Post Grad) course from FTII, Pune.

== Acting career ==
After graduating he was offered a role as a lecturer at NSD. It was during 1979-80 that Sir Richard Attenborough visited India in search of talented indian actors for his upcoming movie Gandhi. Attenborough visited NSD as it was the biggest premier Institute for acting and discovered Mr. Razdan along with a pool of talented theatre artists for his film.

Mr. Razdan was chosen for a role of Maulana Azad and that’s how his journey as an actor began. Gandhi was a big success and won 8 Academy Awards from 11 Nominations. His next project was B.R Chopra’s Mahabharat where he played Vidur which again was the biggest success story in indian Television History.

== Death ==
Razdan died in Mumbai on 13 June 2003, due to stomach cancer at the age of 52.

== Filmography ==
=== Films ===
Year	Title	Role	Notes
1982	Gandhi	Maulana Azad	
1983	The Lost Ruby	Chief Minister of King	BBC Film Festival (Short Film)
1984	Wasta		
1985	Yaadon Ki Kasam	Fake Landlord	https://www.dailymotion.com/video/x17dii7 (3:42 onwards)
1985	Doongar Ro Bhed		https://www.imdb.com/title/tt0266480
1986	Shart		
1990	Jaan Lada Denge	Inspector Gayakwad	https://www.youtube.com/watch?v=igwwwcKosxc (1:02:42 Onwards)
1990	Prakope		
1992	Kal Ki Awaz	Mr. Malhotra (Saptahik Aawaaz Reporter)	https://www.youtube.com/watch?v=tyBUG3XeQQk (11:37 Onwards)
1993	Aaja Meri Jaan	Mr. Agarwal	https://www.youtube.com/watch?v=5_JuGy3RmYU (10:04 Onwards)
1996	Zulm Hi Zulm	Inspector	https://www.youtube.com/watch?v=y5plXr6BrCo (2:48 Onwards)
1998	Zanjeer: The Chain	Kaka	https://www.youtube.com/watch?v=NitHmEVZg0Y&t=1422s (17:03 Onwards)
2001	Bub	Ratanlal (Vinod’s Uncle)	https://www.imdb.com/title/tt1262868
2008	Yaar Meri Zindagi	Pujari (Flashback Story Narrator)	https://www.youtube.com/watch?v=_izPflaWH60 (2:21 Onwards) Delayed Release.

=== Television ===
Year	Serial	Role	Notes
1985	Darpan		
1985	Ek Kahaani		
1986	Katha Sagar		
1988	Mahabharat	Mahatma Vidur	
1988	Bharat Ek Khoj	Many Characters	
1991	Majdhaar	https://www.youtube.com/watch?v=6AnnEZXy4Io (Promo 0:10 Onwards)	
1993	Dillagi	Mr. Shrivastava	
1993	Junoon	Advocate Adhikari	
1994	Aasmaan Se Aagey	Mr. Raghuraj	
1995	Vishwamitra	Rishi Kanva	
1995	Kanoon (TV series) Kanoon	Narendra Khanna	
1995	Saaye Deodar Ke	Madhav (Hakeem)	
1995	Zameen	Farmer	
1996	Aurat	Mr. Rajendra Kumar (Advocate)	
1996	Yug	Raheem Chacha	
1996	Ehsaas2 (Zameer)	Inspector	
1996	Parvarish		
1997	Mahayodha		
2000	Vishnu Puraan	Maharishi Bhrigu	
2000	Jap Tap Vrat	Dev Vishvakarma	
2002	Jab Apne Hue Paraye		
