= Amir Meenai =

Indian Urdu poet

Ameer Minai Lucknowi
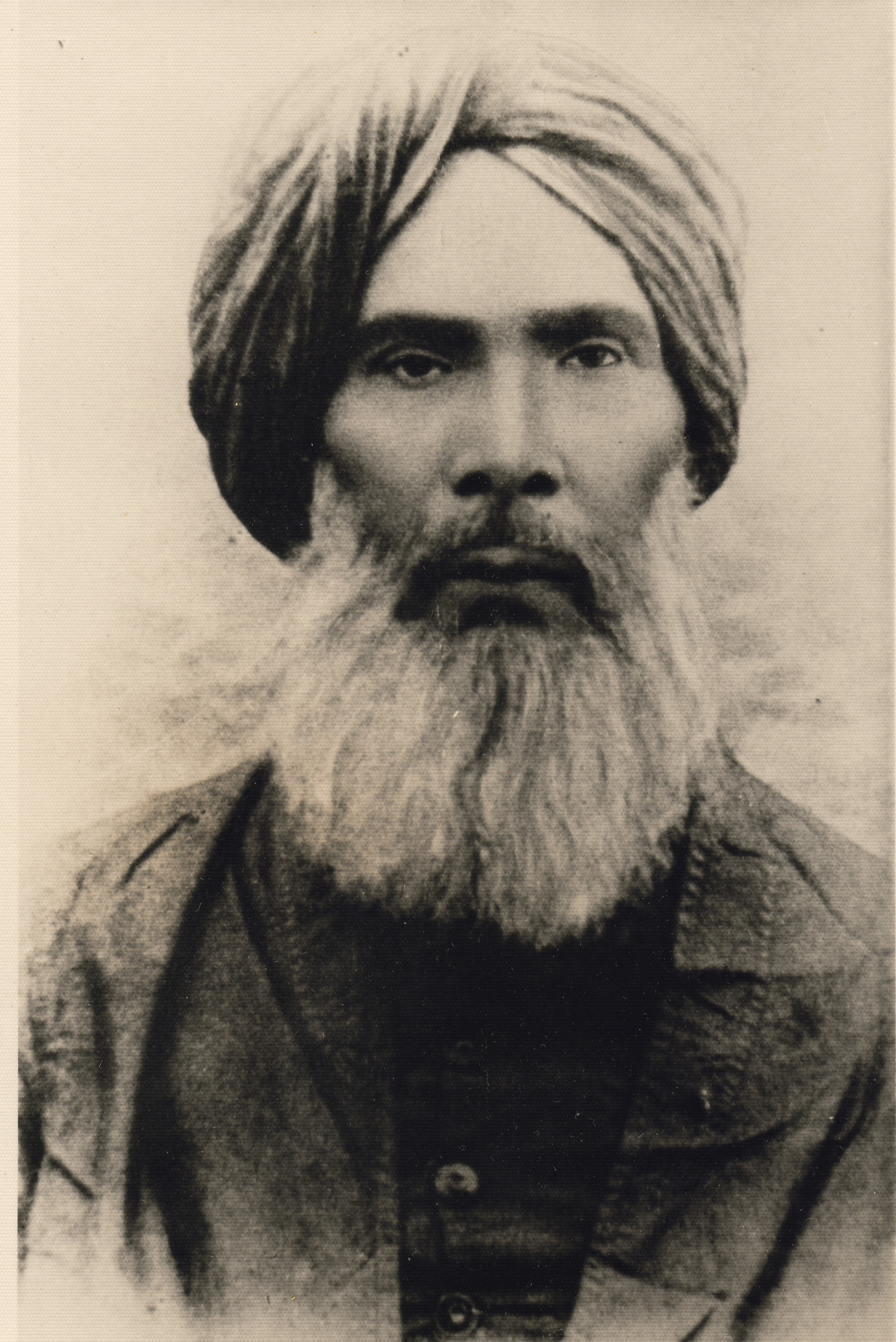
- Born: 1829; Lucknow, Awadh State, Company India (present-day Uttar Pradesh, India)
- Died: 13 October 1900 (aged 71–72); Hyderabad, Hyderabad State, British India (present-day Telangana, India)
- Occupations: Poet, writer, lexicographer and linguist
- Writing career
- Pen name: Ameer
- Period: Post-Mughal era
- Genres: Ghazal, Nazm, Na`at, Hamd
- Subjects: Love, philosophy, mysticism

Ameer Minai or Amir Meenai (Urdu: امیر مینائی; 1829 — 13 October 1900) was a 19th-century Indian Urdu poet. He was respected by several contemporary poets including Ghalib and Daagh Dehalvi and by Muhammad Iqbal. He wrote in Urdu, Persian and Arabic.

== Early life ==
The Minai family had lived in Lucknow for centuries in the area around Shah Mina's tomb, known as "Mina Bazaar" or "Mohalla-e Minaian" (The Quarter of the Minais). Ameer was educated at Farangi Mahal, Lucknow's primary educational institute.

== Work ==
In the British attack on Lucknow in 1856 and the subsequent First war of independence in 1857, the family's homes were all destroyed and Meenai was forced to flee with his family, first to the nearby town of Kakori where he found refuge with the poet Mohsin Kakorvi, and eventually to the state of Rampur, where he found favor at the court of the ruler, Nawab of Rampur Yusef Ali Khan Bahadur.

He served in the judiciary, was appointed head of Rampur's magnificent library, and became the official poetic mentor (ustad) of the ruler, succeeding the great Urdu poet, Ghalib, in this position. Meenai lived in Rampur until 1900 when he decided to go to Hyderabad Deccan to seek financial support for the publication of his Urdu dictionary, "Ameer-ul-Lughaat" – but that was not to be, and he died there on 13 October 1900, barely a month after his arrival. He is buried in Hyderabad, India.

== Poetry ==
In poetry, Meenai is best known for his ghazals, and for the na`at genre—poems in praise of Muhammad, which he helped popularize in Urdu poetry.

== Legacy ==
Mutaala'-e Ameer by Abu Muhammad Sahar, published in Lucknow in 1963, analyses Meenai's life and literary work.

== Popular naat poetry ==
Meenai was considered a pioneer of naat poetry.

- Halke Mein Rasoolon ke Woh Mahay Madani Hai, Sung by Nusrat Fateh Ali Khan, naat lyrics by Amir Meenai
- Tera karam jo shah-e-zee-vaqaar ho jaaye Naat qawwali by Amir Meenai, sung by Qawwal Bahauddin Khan
- Tum par mein laakh jaan se qurbaan Ya Rasool Naat lyrics by Amir Meenai, sung by Umme Habiba
- Uss karam ka karun shukr kaisay ada, jo karam mujh pe meray Nabi kar diyya Naat qawwali written by Amir Meenai, sung by Nusrat Fateh Ali Khan

== Popular ghazal songs ==
- 'Sarakatee jaayey hai rukh se naqab aahista, aahista...' Lyrics by Amir Meenai, sung and popularised by ghazal maestro Jagjit Singh and later also featured in a film starring Rishi Kapoor and Tina Munim.
- 'Jab se bulbul too ne do tinkay liye / loTtee haeN bijliyaaN in kay liye', sung by K.L. Saigal, Ghulam Ali, M. Kalim and others
- 'Naavak-e naaz se mushkil hae bachaana dil kaa / dard uTh uTh ke bataataa nae Thikaana dil kaa', sung by Ustad Barkat Ali Khan
- 'Zaahir meiN ham faryfta husn-e butaaN ke haeN / par kyaa kahayN nigaah meN jalvay kahaaN ke haeN', sung by Farida Khanum
- Mehfil Barkhast Hui, sung by Kavita Seth in A Suitable Boy

== Bibliography ==
Amir Meenai wrote over 40 books in his lifetime, some of which are unpublished.

- Subah-e-Azal
- Shaam-e-Awadh
- Divan-e-Farsi (Persian poetry), edited by Tehseen Firaqi, published in 2016
- Miraat-ul-ghaib
- Sanam khana-i-ishq
- Khayaban-i-Aafrinish (Prophet Muhammad's life in easy prose)
