= Rehguzar =

- Directed by: Jyoti Sarup
- Written by: Partho Mukharjee
- Produced by: Premlata Mehta
- Starring: Shekhar Suman; Simple Kapadia; Aarti Mehta; Jyoti Sarup
- Music by: Sardar Anjum
- Distributed by: Surya Bharti Creations
- Release date: 1985 (Video release)
- Running time: 135 minutes
- Country: India
- Language: Hindi

Rehguzar is a 1985 Indian direct-to-video romantic film starring Shekhar Suman and Simple Kapadia. It was directed by Jyoti Sarup, who also appears in the film. First released for video in 1985, it was later telecast on Doordarshan in 1989. Featuring music by Sardar Anjum, this is the only film for which he ever gave music.

== Plot ==
A small town, aspiring, lyricist Shekhar goes to Bombay to make it big. He stays in the city on rent in a house, which is owned by a person from his town. The daughter of his landlord, Simple falls in love with him and he reciprocates the feelings too. Meanwhile, he meets the secretary of a famous lyricist in the business. The secretary buys his lyrics and passes it on to his boss who records the songs, which become hits. Frustrated by ghost-writing for others he searches ways to get famous himself. He meets a famous female singer, Aarti who, liking his lyrics, sings for his songs and helps him become famous.

The conflict for him arises when he learns that the Aarti also loves him. The secretary takes advantage of the situation and tries to create a rift between Aarti and Shekhar so that she sings for the lyrics written by his boss. While Shekhar is in a dilemma, of what to do because he is in love with Simple, and Aarti is the one who has helped him achieve whatever he wanted in life, Aarti finds out she has cancer. Clearing things with Shekhar, she then dies of the disease.

== Cast ==
- Shekhar Suman as Shekhar
- Simple Kapadia as Simple
- Aarti Mehta as Aarti
- Bharat Bhushan as Landlord
- Mayur as Film Star
- Jyoti Sarup as Lyrics writer's secretary
- Guddi Maruti

== Songs ==
1. "Har Sitam Jhel Kar" – Minoo Purushottam
2. "Husn Par Jab Kabhi Shabab Aaya" – Minoo Purushottam
3. "Jab Talak Hai Shabab Rehne Do" – Anup Jalota
4. "Kya Kahoon Meherbaan Nahi Maloom" – Minoo Purushottam
5. "Nainon Mein Chori Chori" – Aarti Mukherjee
6. "Zakhm Rehguzaaron Ke Yaad Un Baharon Ki" – Minoo Purushottam
