= Bub (film) =

2001 Indian film directed by Jyoti Sarup

- Directed by: Jyoti Sarup
- Written by: Jyoti Sarup; Pamposh Bhat
- Starring: K. K. Raina; Virendra Razdan; Raju Kher; Kuber Sarup; Yogesh Kilam
- Cinematography: Gagrin Mishra
- Edited by: Chetan Dubey
- Music by: Pt. Bhajan Sopori; Bashir Arif (lyrics)
- Production company: NFDC
- Distributed by: NFDC
- Release date: 1 December 2001
- Running time: 114 minutes
- Country: India
- Language: Kashmiri

Bub (English: Father) is an Indian film in Kashmiri language directed by Jyoti Sarup. It was released in Jammu on 1 December 2001. It is the third Kashmiri film, the preceding one was released 38 years previously. The film won the Nargis Dutt Award for Best Feature Film on National Integration at the 49th National Film Awards. The film is based on the Wandhama Massacre, where several Kashmiri Pandits were killed by militants before Republic Day on 26 January and focuses on a family that was massacred.

== Cast ==
- K. K. Raina ... Shiban Lal
- Kuber Sarup ... Vinod
- Virendra Razdan ... Vinod's uncle
- Raju Kher ... Neighbor
- Yogesh Kilam ... Shiban's younger brother
- Meenakshi Koul ... Neighbor's daughter

== Reaction ==
Bub was greeted with a positive response from the media. The Hindu said that the film "describes the pain of a Kashmiri boy who lost his parents" and it also "gives an insight into the various aspects of Kashmiri society, culture". Radio Kashmir praised the performances, saying "Mr. K.K.Raina, whose character runs throughout the movie, has done an excellent job". Praising the newcomer it said, "The young Kuber Sarup, 14 years old, does a very superb restrained part".

== Awards ==
- Nargis Dutt Award for Best Feature Film on National Integration
