= Dulha Bikta Hai =

- Film poster
- Directed by: Anwar Pasha
- Written by: Ranjan Bose (story and screenplay); Madan Joshi (dialogues)
- Produced by: Tahir Hussain
- Starring: Raj Babbar, Anita Raj, Neelam, Simple Kapadia, Madan Puri, Iftekhar, Jagdish Raj, Urmila Bhatt
- Music by: Bappi Lahiri
- Release date: 17 September 1982
- Country: India
- Language: Hindi

Dulha Bikta Hai is a 1982 Hindi drama film directed by Anwar Pasha starring Raj Babbar, Anita Raj and Neelam.

== Cast ==
- Raj Babbar as Deepak Walia
- Anita Raj
- Neelam Mehra
- Simple Kapadia
- Madan Puri
- Iftekhar
- Jagdish Raj
- Urmila Bhatt

== Soundtrack ==
1. "Dulha Bikta Hai" - Kishore Kumar
2. "Kahan Jate Ho Ruk Jaao Tumhe Meri Kasam" - Meena Patki, Anwar
3. "Kahan Jaate Ho Ruk Jao" (Female) - Meena Patki
4. "Natija Achchha Niklega, Aa Jaa Mere Yaar Kare Hum Dono Aanke Char" - Anwar, Chandrani Mukherjee, Preeti Sagar
5. "Pyar Ki Hai Yeh Ada Yaara Tum Dar Gaye" - Meena Patki, Bappi Lahiri
6. "Adao Se Hamari Na Bach Paoge" - Dilip Sharma, Sulakshana Pandit, Anwar
