= Lootmaar =

- Poster
- Directed by: Dev Anand
- Produced by: Dev Anand
- Starring: Dev Anand; Tina Munim; Rakhee Gulzar; Nirupa Roy
- Music by: Rajesh Roshan
- Release date: 10 October 1980
- Country: India
- Language: Hindi

Lootmaar (transl. Depredator) is a 1980 Indian Hindi mystery film produced and directed by Dev Anand. The film stars Dev Anand, Tina Munim, Mehmood, Nirupa Roy, Prem Chopra, Ranjeet, Shakti Kapoor, Kader Khan, Amjad Khan, Simple Kapadia, Shreeram Lagoo, and Rakhee Gulzar. The film's music was composed by Rajesh Roshan.

== Plot ==
Indian Air Force pilot Bhagat lives with his wife, Raksha and a young son. While going to the bank one day, the family find that the bank is being held up. The bank-robbers panic at the arrival of the police, and fire randomly, killing Raksha instantly. Bhagat witnesses this horrific spectacle and is unable to do anything to save his wife. The robbers were masked, but one of them had a tear in his shoe and another was wearing a locket, very similar to the one worn by his wife. Bhagat's inquiries take him to the northernmost hilly regions of India, where he must confront the past, as well as seek out the elusive killers and bring them to justice, not knowing that in so doing he will be endangering the life of his son.

== Cast ==
- Dev Anand as Wing Commander Bhagat / Jim Darcy
- Tina Munim as Neela
- Raakhee Gulzar as Raksha (Guest appearance)
- Mehmood as John Gonzales
- Nirupa Roy as Satyavati
- Prem Chopra as Damodar
- Ranjeet as Peter
- Shakti Kapoor as Pratap
- Kader Khan as Dhanraj
- Amjad Khan as Vikram
- Simple Kapadia as Rani
- Shreeram Lagoo as Seth Ramniklal
- Om Shivpuri as Mr. Bhagat
- Sudhir Dalvi as Pandit
- Ram Mohan as Police Inspector Kabir
- Sharat Saxena as Police Inspector Ratan
- Kalpana Iyer as Dancer

== Soundtrack ==
The film's soundtrack was composed by Rajesh Roshan and the lyrics were penned by Amit Khanna.

1. "Piya Hum Saat Mulk Ka Pani" – Kishore Kumar
2. "Aaj Ka Din" – Kishore Kumar, Lata Mangeshkar
3. "Piya Hum" – Kishore Kumar, Mehmood
4. "Hans Tu Hardam Khushiya Ya Gum" – Kishore Kumar, Varsha Bhosle, Shivangi Kolhapure
5. "Jab Chaye Mera Jadoo" – Asha Bhosle
6. "Main Aur Tu Kar Le Dosti" – Lata Mangeshkar
7. "Paas Ho Tum Magar Karib Nahi" – Lata Mangeshkar
8. "Hans Tu Hardam" – Lata Mangeshkar

== Reception ==
One reviewer said of the film, "Alas, the story simply does not reach the same heights as the casting. The music, too, is utterly disposable, with perhaps one decent song in the bunch."
