= Simple Kapadia =

Indian actress and costume designer (1958–2009)

- An undated picture of Kapadia
- Born: 15 August 1958; Bombay, Bombay State, India
- Died: 10 November 2009 (aged 51); Mumbai, Maharashtra, India
- Occupations: Actress, costume designer
- Years active: 1977–2009
- Spouse: Rajinder Singh Shetty (m. 1992; div. 1999)
- Children: 1
- Family: Khanna family

Simple Kapadia (15 August 1958 – 10 November 2009) was a Hindi film actress and costume designer, who was active in her professional career from 1987 until her death in 2009. She won the National Film Award for Best Costume Design for Rudaali (1994).

== Early and personal life ==
Simple was born on 15 August 1958 to parents Chunnibhai and Betty Kapadia. She was raised alongside 3 siblings - elder sister Dimple Kapadia, younger sister Reem Kapadia and Suhail (Munna) Kapadia.

She had a son with Rajinder Singh Shetty, whom she married on 25 June 1992 but their marriage did not last long and they got divorced. She was the maternal aunt of former actresses Twinkle Khanna and Rinke Khanna. Her son made his acting debut with the film Blank (2019).

== Career ==
=== Acting ===
Simple Kapadia made her acting debut in 1977 at the age of 18 in the role of Sumitha Mathur in the film Anurodh, with her brother-in-law, actor Rajesh Khanna. And then again the next year in Chakravyuha. She starred opposite Jeetendra in Shakka.

She played supporting roles in Lootmaar, Zamaane Ko Dikhana Hai, Jeevan Dhaara and Dulha Bikta Hai. In 1985 she starred in the art film Rehguzar opposite Shekhar Suman. Her last acting gig was an item song for Parakh in 1987.

=== Costume design ===
After her final acting gig, she became a costume designer, and designed for actors including Sunny Deol, Tabu, Amrita Singh, Sridevi and Priyanka Chopra.

In 1994, she won a National Film Award for Best Costume Design for Rudaali, which starred her sister. She later designed for Indian movies including Rok Sako To Rok Lo and Shaheed.

== Filmography ==
=== As an actress ===
Year	Title
1977	Anurodh
1978	Chakravyuha
1979	Ahsaas
1979	Kizakkum Merkum Sandhikarana (Tamil)
1980	Man Pasand
1980	Lootmaar
1981	Shakka
1981	Zamaane Ko Dikhana Hai
1981	Parakh
1982	Dulha Bikta Hai
1982	Jeevan Dhaara
1982	Tumhare Bina
1984	Hum Rahe Na Hum
1985	Rehguzar
1986	Pyaar Ke Do Pal

=== As a costume designer ===
Year	Title
1987	Insaaf
1989	Shehzaade
1990	Drishti
1990	Lekin...
1991	Ajooba
1993	Darr
1993	Aaj Kie Aurat
1993	Rudaali
1995	Barsaat
1996	Ghatak: Lethal
1996	Jaan
1996	Uff Yeh Mohabbat
1996	Ajay
1998	Chachi 420
1998	Jab Pyaar Kisise Hota Hai
1999	Yeh Hai Mumbai Meri Jaan
2001	Indian
2001	Pyaar Zindagi Hai
2001	Kasam
2002	23rd March 1931: Shaheed
2003	The Hero: Love Story of a Spy
2004	Rok Sako to Rok Lo
2005	Socha Na Tha
2006	Naksha
2006	Gafla

== Awards and nominations ==
- 1994 - National Film Award for Best Costume Design for Rudaali

== Death ==
Simple Kapadia was diagnosed with cancer in 2006, but continued working despite the pain. She died in a hospital in Andheri, Mumbai on 10 November 2009, aged 51.

== See also ==
- List of Indian film actresses
