= Des Pardes (1978 film) =

- Poster
- Directed by: Dev Anand
- Written by: Dev Anand; Suraj Sanim
- Produced by: Dev Anand; Amit Khanna; Navketan; Navketan International Films
- Starring: Dev Anand; Tina Munim; Mehmood; Pran; Ajit Khan; Amjad Khan; Prem Chopra
- Cinematography: Fali Mistry; D. K. Prabhakar
- Music by: Rajesh Roshan; Amit Khanna (lyrics)
- Release date: 29 June 1978
- Country: India
- Language: Hindi

Des Pardes (transl. Home and Abroad) is a 1978 Hindi drama film, produced and directed by Dev Anand. It stars Dev Anand and Tina Munim (in her debut film), with Ajit Khan, Pran, Amjad Khan, Shreeram Lagoo, Tom Alter, Bindu, Prem Chopra, A. K. Hangal, Sujit Kumar, Mehmood and Paintal in the supporting cast. For the first time, Dev Anand chose comparatively new music director Rajesh Roshan for this film, who did full justice to his selection as most of the songs became quite popular. The film received a Filmfare award for its sets and also received a nomination for best music director. The message of this film is about the trend with some people, at the time, to earn money from foreign lands and that innocent ones being trapped and tormented by the illicit operators.

== Plot ==
Samir Sahni is a farmer living with his mom, dad, wife, Rama, a young daughter, and his younger brother, Veer. Samir gets an offer to work in the U.K., and departs accordingly. He would like to settle there, and after doing so, would like his family to also join him. The years go by, and Samir keeps in touch with his family regularly. Then the Sahni family stop receiving any letters from him, and are anxious to know what has happened to him. Veer is asked to travel to U.K. to find out, and he does so. What he finds are tens of thousands of East Indians on fake passports, working for less than minimum wages, poor unhealthy conditions, fear of being deported, and paying half of their earnings to fellow East Indians who had got them here through the underground. Veer finds no sign of his brother, and sets out to investigate, only to find deceit, murder, and that his very own life in danger.

== Cast ==
- Dev Anand as Veer Sahni
- Tina Munim as Gauri
- Pran as Samir Sahni
- Gajanan Jagirdar as Mr. Sahni
- Indrani Mukherjee as Rama Sahni
- Ajit Khan as Gurnam
- Tom Alter as Inspector Martin
- Bindu as Sylvia
- Prem Chopra as Bansilal
- A. K. Hangal as Pujari
- Jankidas as Daiyal
- Bharat Kapoor as Murarilal
- Amjad Khan as Boota Singh / Avtar Singh
- Sujit Kumar as Gangaram
- Shreeram Lagoo as Mr. Burns
- Mehmood as Anwar
- Keith Stevenson as A. Tupper
- Birbal as Announcer
- Sudhir as Kashyap
- Paintal
- Gufi Paintal
- Sharat Saxena
- Prem Sagar
- Raj Mehra
- Yusuf Khan

== Crew ==
- Writer - Dev Anand, Suraj Sanim
- Producer - Dev Anand, Amit Khanna
- Production Company - Navketan International Films, Navketan
- Cinematographer - Fali Mistry, D. K. Prabhakar
- Music Director - Rajesh Roshan
- Lyricist - Amit Khanna
- Playback Singers - Kishore Kumar, Lata Mangeshkar, Amit Kumar, Manhar Udhas, Vijay Benedict,

== Soundtrack ==
All the songs are composed by Rajesh Roshan, with lyrics by Amit Khanna.

- Song "Tu Pee Aur Jee" was listed at #9 on Binaca Geetmala annual list 1978
- Song "Aap Kahen Aur Ham Na Aaye" was listed at #13 on Binaca Geetmala annual list 1978
- Song "Jaisa Des Waisa Bhes" was listed at #22 on Binaca Geetmala annual list 1978

#	Title	Singer(s)	Duration
1	"Nazrana Bheja Kisine Pyar Ka"	Kishore Kumar	04:19
2	"Ye Des Pardes"	Kishore Kumar	04:03
3	"Tu Pee Aur Jee"	Kishore Kumar	06:20
4	"Jaisa Des Waisa Bhes"	Kishore Kumar, Lata Mangeshkar	04:47
5	"Nazar Lage Naa Saathiyon"	Kishore Kumar, Amit Kumar, Vijay Benedict, Manhar Udhas	04:29
6	"Aap Kahen Aur Ham Na Aaye"	Lata Mangeshkar	05:38
