= V. Gopi Krishna =

Indian cinematographer and film producer

- Born: Andhra Pradesh, India
- Occupation: Cinematographer

Dasari Gopi Krishna, better known as V. Gopi Krishna, was a cinematographer and producer in the Indian film industry. He was born in Brahmana Koduru in Guntur district of Andhra Pradesh. His parents are Dasari Venkateswarlu and Saraswathamma. After primary education, he studied in Chebrolu and Guntur.

Due to strong determination towards the field of cinema, he went to Chennai and became an assistant to cinematographer V. N. Reddy. His brother V. Subbarao was also a cinematographer. Both of them worked for Vijaya - Vahini studios and Devar films for a decade and later shifted to Bollywood. He added 'V' to his name and became a popular cinematographer in the Hindi film industry. His debut film Kashmir Ki Kali was in 1964 followed by Pugli and Do Raste. He served as the cinematographer for the film An Evening in Paris (1967), which was filmed entirely in Paris.

He was a close associate of Rajesh Khanna and produced the film Bhola Bhala in 1978. Rajesh Khanna played a double role opposite Rekha in this film. His brother V. Subbarao was the cinematographer for this film.

He died suddenly due to heart attack in 1980.

== Filmography ==
- Intiki Deepam Illalu (1961)
- Kashmir Ki Kali (1964) (camera operator)
- Sawan Ki Ghata (1966) (cinematographer)
- Anita (1967) (cinematographer)
- An Evening in Paris (1967) (cinematographer)
- Pagla Kahin Ka (1970)
- Kati Patang (1970) (director of photography)
- Bachpan (1970) (cinematographer)
- Bhola Bhala (1978) (producer)
- Abdullah (1980) (cinematographer)
