= Man Pasand =

- Poster
- Directed by: Basu Chatterjee
- Written by: Basu Chatterjee (dialogues)
- Based on: Pygmalion by George Bernard Shaw
- Produced by: Amit Khanna
- Starring: Dev Anand; Tina Munim; Girish Karnand
- Cinematography: K. K. Mahajan
- Edited by: Babu Sheikh
- Music by: Rajesh Roshan; Frederick Loewe
- Release date: 11 July 1980
- Country: India
- Language: Hindi

Man Pasand (English: Favourite) is a 1980 Hindi movie produced by Amit Khanna under the Film Unit banner and directed by Basu Chatterjee. The film stars Dev Anand, Tina Munim, Girish Karnad, Simple Kapadia, Mehmood. The film's music is by Rajesh Roshan while the lyrics were penned by Amit Khanna himself. A couple of songs from the film had become popular.

Although the film is dedicated to George Bernard Shaw—with the implication that it is based on his 1913 play Pygmalion—according to Dev Anand, the film was actually based on the 1964 film My Fair Lady. This film is based on Marathi drama Ti Fulrani penned by P L Deshpande, which is in-turn based on George Bernard Shaw' famous play Pygmalion.

== Plot ==
Best friends and musicologists Pratap (Dev Anand) and Kashinath (Girish Karnad) make a bet that Pratap can transform any unpolished girl into a graceful and talented singer in only six months' time. Kashinath agrees that he will marry the girl if Pratap is successful. One night they accidentally take the wrong train after a party. They encounter Kamli (Tina Munim), a loud-mouthed vendor of neem branches on the train and Pratap tells her that she could become a skilled singer. At first, Kamli laughs at him, but changes her mind and comes to see him the next day, saying she will pay him for music lessons. Kamli moves in with the acerbic and bossy Pratap to become his full-time pupil. With the help of his invention the scalograph, Pratap teaches Kamli to sing classical music and play the tambura. Meanwhile, soft-spoken and gentlemanly Kashinath teaches her the culture of music, proper etiquette and how to talk correctly. Kamli's shiftless father Popatlal (Mehmood) shows up to complain about the unorthodox living arrangement, but the two men pay him off and send him away. They decide to test their protege and take Kamli to a party where they pass her off as part of a royal family. Unfortunately, she drinks too much and gives the game away. After the party, Kamli gives Pratap's secretary a month off and takes over his duties, becoming indispensable to her teacher. Finally, the big day arrives and Kamli performs in front of a large audience where she is a great success. Afterwards, Pratap and Kashinath congratulate themselves on their great success, forgetting Kamli's hard work. In despair about her uncertain future and filled with sadness that Pratap does not care for her, she fights with him and leaves. Pratap pretends to be indifferent. Kashinath, knowing his friend well, points out that he has obviously fallen in love with her and releases him from the bet. Pratap is miserable without Kamli, but he is too proud to ask her back. Just when he thinks she is gone forever, she returns to him.

== Cast ==
- Dev Anand as Pratap "Pat"
- Tina Munim as Kamli
- Girish Karnad as Kashinath
- Simple Kapadia as Ruby
- Mehmood as Popatlal Datoonwala

== Music ==
The film's music was composed by Rajesh Roshan with lyrics by Amit Khanna. The songs "Rehne Ko Ek Ghar" and "Hothon Pe Geet Jage" were adapted from "Wouldn't It Be Loverly" and "I Could Have Danced All Night", both originally composed by Frederick Loewe.

1. "Manmani Se Hargiz Na Daro" (Kishore Kumar)
2. "Mein Akela Apni Dhun Men Magan" (Kishore Kumar)
3. "Kismat Ki Jeb Mein" (Mehmood)
4. "Chaaru Chandra Ki Chanchal Chitwan" (Kishore Kumar, Lata Mangeshkar)
5. "Logon Ka Dil Agar" (Mohammed Rafi)
6. "Rehne Ko Ek Ghar" (T Meena)
7. "Hothon Pe Geet Jage" (Lata Mangeshkar)
8. "Suman Sudha" (Lata Mangeshkar)
9. "Sa Re Ga Ma Pa" (Kishore Kumar, Lata Mangeshkar)
