= Buniyaad =

Indian Hindi-language television series

- Genre: Soap opera
- Written by: Manohar Shyam Joshi
- Directed by: Ramesh Sippy; Jyoti Sarup
- Starring: see below
- Opening theme: "Buniyaad" by Anup Jalota
- Country of origin: India
- Original language: Hindi
- No. of episodes: 105

Production
- Producer: Amit Khanna
- Cinematography: K.K. Mahajan
- Editor: M.S. Shinde

Original release
- Network: DD National
- Release: May 1986 – May 1987

Buniyaad (transl. Foundation) is an Indian television soap opera directed by Ramesh Sippy and Jyoti Sarup. The series was written by Manohar Shyam Joshi and dealt with the Partition of India in 1947 and its aftermath. It was first aired in 1986 on the Indian state television channel DD National. It was re-aired on Sahara One in 2006 and on DD National and DD Retro during COVID-19 lockdown in India. The story spans the life in India between 1915 and 1985.

== Plot ==
Buniyaad is an Indian television drama that follows the lives of Master Haveliram Khanna, a principled schoolteacher in Lahore, and his wife Lajwanti (Lajjo), against the backdrop of the Partition of India in 1947. Beginning in pre-Partition Lahore, the series explores the relationships within the extended Khanna family before chronicling their forced migration to Delhi as refugees. As they rebuild their lives, the story examines the emotional, social, and economic consequences of displacement across several decades. Through the experiences of different generations of the Khanna family, Buniyaad portrays themes of loss, resilience, identity, changing family values, and the lasting legacy of Partition. Widely regarded as one of Indian television’s landmark historical dramas, the series combines personal stories with the broader history of one of the largest migrations in modern history.

== Cast ==
Actor/Actress	Character	Notes
Sudhir Pandey	Lala Gaindamal	Haveliram's father
Asha Sharma	Janko (Chachi Ji)	Haveliram's mother
Rajesh Puri	Munshi Khajanchand	Gaindamal's accountant (Munshi)
Bharti Achrekar	Rampyari	Fruit-seller Rampyara's wife and Gaindamal's family acquaintance
Meher Mittal	Rampyara	Fruit-seller Rampyari's husband and Gaindamal's family acquaintance
Girija Shankar	Raliyaram	Haveliram's elder brother and Shanno's husband
Asha Sachdev	Shanno	Gaindamal's elder daughter-in-law
Mangal Dhillon	Labhayaram	Raliyaram's son
Pallavi Joshi	Rano	Labhayaram's wife
Neesha Singh	Kanni	Labhaya's niece and Pasho's daughter
Gayathri Burman	Pasho	Raliyaram's only surviving daughter
Anjan Srivastav	Lala Dharamchand	Rano's Grandfather
Alok Nath	Master Haveliram	A freedom fighter and patriot
Anita Kanwar	Lajjo (Lajwanti)	Haveliram's wife
Goga Kapoor	Bhai Aatmaram	Lajwanti's uncle, Haveliram's mentor and fellow freedom fighter
Dalip Tahil	Bhushan (Kulbhushan)	Haveliram's elder son
Soni Razdan	Lochan (Sulochana)	Haveliram's elder daughter-in-law and Bhushan's wife
Rajan Haksar	Daddy Ji: Rai Bahadur Mewa Lal	Lochan's Father and Bhushan's Father-in-law
Sarita Sethi	Mummy Ji: Mohini Marasan	Lochan's mother and Bhushan's mother-in-law
Suresh Chatwal	Girdharilal	Lochan's stepbrother
Arun Bakshi	Kanwar	Play director and Lochan's love interest
Shernaz Patel	Kukki	Kulbhushan's elder daughter
Mazhar Khan	Roshan (Roshanlal)	Haveliram's younger son
Neena Gupta	Rajjo	Roshan's wife
Leela Mishra	Chachi	Rajjo's aunt and flat-owner
Natasha Sinha	Nivedita Sengupta	Roshan's first employer and love interest
Jayshree Arora	Mrs. Sengupta	Nivedita's Mother
Kiran Juneja	Veeravali in Lahore/ Pragyavati in Uttarkashi	Haveliram's sister
Sudhir Dalvi	Guruji	at Pragyavati's Uttarkashi ashram
Vijayendra Ghatge	Lala Vrishbhan	Veeravali's love interest, Satbir's and Jay's biological father
Anjana Mumtaz	Subhadra	Vrishbhan's wife and Jay's mother
Kanwaljit Singh	Satbir	Veeravali and Vrishbhan's illegitimate son, Haveliram and Lajjo's adopted son
Abhinav Chaturvedi	Jay Bhushan (Jay)	Vrishbhan's legitimate son, Kaka's biological father
Krutika Desai Khan	Mangla	Jay's wife and Satbir's lifelong love interest
Kamia Malhotra	Kanta Suri (Babli) in Sheikhupura -Delhi	Jay's secretary and love interest, Kaka's biological mother
Antariksh Mathur	Kaka	Satbir's adopted son, Babli's biological son
Vikas Anand	Harsharandas	Mangla's Father
Zankhana Desai	Rajrani	Mangla's mother
Vinod Nagpal	Shyamlal	Subhadra's family friend and distant relative
S. M. Zaheer	Habibullah	Vrishbhan's lawyer and friend

== Reception ==
Madhu Jain of India Today wrote, "Tuesday and Saturday nights are curfew time in Lahore: the streets of the city are empty as people rush home to see their favourite Buniyaad. Back home in India too, the TV series is rapidly moving up the popularity charts, and now ranks second among all TV serials, behind Nukkad."
