= Shakka (film) =

- Poster
- Directed by: Shyam Ralhan
- Written by: Kader Khan (dialogues)
- Screenplay by: K.K. Shukla
- Story by: Shyam Ralhan
- Produced by: Kailash Chopra
- Starring: Jeetendra; Simple Kapadia
- Cinematography: Nando Bhattacharya
- Edited by: B. S. Glaad
- Music by: Rajesh Roshan
- Production company: The Roop Enterprises
- Release date: 6 November 1981
- Running time: 121 mins
- Country: India
- Language: Hindi

Shakka is a 1981 Hindi-language action film, produced by Kailash Chopra under the Roop Enterprises banner and directed by Sham Ralhan. It stars Jeetendra, Simple Kapadia and music composed by Rajesh Roshan.

== Plot ==
One night, some dark businessmen, the enemies of our nation, entered the house of an honest country-loving person to save their life. They ruthlessly murdered Shakka's parents in front of him. Shakka, only twelve years old, somehow managed to escape and ran for his life.

He did not stop in this race of life; he had a long way to go, his destination unknown – he aimed to find those murderers, those masked killers who had killed his parents and he had to unmask them.

Days passed, years passed, childhood went and came manhood; Shakka had all the power of youth and also the blood of his brave parents, which was like lava bubbling within him; impatient to turn his enemies to ashes.

To reach those murderers, Shakka had to cross all those paths filled with crime and poison; those paths which change a man into a devil. Shakka also became like a devil in his neighborhood and he became one of the groups of devils who were responsible for the murder of his parents. On this road of crime, Shakka met Meena, who was a renowned thief. She too, like Shakka, was lonely in life, brought up by a criminal and left alone on those roads of crime.

When Shakka was very near to his destination, he learned that the real culprit behind the murder of his parents was Seth Dharamdas, who is now leading the life of a very rich nobleman.

On one hand, Shakka's heart was filled with hatred because of the bloody incident in his childhood, but, on the other hand, was a streak of love. Meena's love; that Meena with whom he had spent several hours playing at the seaside, he used to collect all kinds of shells for his Meena and see the wonders of fate.

Today, the girl thief Meena is the same Meena of his childhood days. Shakka had found his lost love, but when he discovered that his Meena was the daughter of the real murderer Seth Dharamdas, he was stunned because there was one Meena in Seth Dharamdas' house and Shakka believed her to be the real Meena.

== Cast ==
- Jeetendra as Shakka
- Simple Kapadia as Meena
- Zaheera as Meena
- Prem Chopra as Prem
- Kader Khan as Qasim Bhai
- Helen as Janki
- Nirupa Roy as Geeta
- Om Shivpuri as Captain Dharamdas
- Satyendra Kapoor as Satyen
- Chandrashekhar as Police Inspector
- Pinchoo Kapoor as John
- Paintal as Jail Inmate
- Ram Mohan as Jail Inmate
- Birbal as Jail Inmate
- Jagdish Raj as Raghu
- Kamaldeep as Bagga
- Sheetal

== Soundtrack ==
Lyrics: Verma Malik

#	Song	Singer
1	"Sun Mere Yaar Duniyawale, Apne Bade Begaane Hai"	Kishore Kumar
2	"Yaar Tere Sab Naach Rahe Hai"	Mohammed Rafi
3	"Agga Bai, Maike Tu Jaau Nakko"	Mohammed Rafi
4	"Mohabbat Huyi Mere Daiya"	Mohammed Rafi, Usha Mangeshkar
5	"Tera Woh Raasta, Mera Woh Raasta"	Mohammed Rafi, Asha Bhosle
