= Bhola Bhala =

1978 film

- Directed by: Satpal
- Written by: V K Sharma
- Produced by: V. Gopi Krishna
- Starring: Moushumi Chatterjee; Rekha; Rajesh Khanna
- Cinematography: V. Subbarao
- Music by: Rahul Dev Burman
- Release date: May 5, 1978
- Country: India
- Language: Hindi

Bhola Bhala (transl. Simpleton) is a 1978 Bollywood action film, directed by Satpal and produced by V. Gopi Krishna. The film stars Rajesh Khanna in a double role, paired opposite Rekha and Moushumi Chatterjee. The film revolves around the innocent insurance agent Ram Kumar Verma, who falls into the trap of the bandit Nathu Singh, who in turn wants Ram to endorse a life insurance policy in the name of Nathu Singh, so that Nathu can fake a death claim and get the amount from the insurance company. The film was a commercial hit upon its release. The musical instrument kalimba was played by Homi Mullan for "Jhuk Gayi Aankhen".

== Cast ==
- Rajesh Khanna as Ram Kumar Verma / Nathu Singh "Nathiya" (Double Role)
- Rekha as Champa
- Moushumi Chatterjee as Renu
- Deven Verma as Babu
- Jagdeep as Tamanchewala
- Naaz as Sarla
- Mumtaz Begum as Pushpa Ram's Mother
- Sulochana Latkar as Renu's Mother
- Satyendra Kapoor as Mr. Kapoor
- Ramesh Deo as Thakur Ajit Singh
- Joginder as Sambha
- Pinchoo Kapoor as General Manager of Jeevan Beema Company

== Soundtrack ==
Lyrics: Anand Bakshi

Song	Singer
"Dheere Dheere Naach Ri"	Kishore Kumar
"Main Hoon Bhola Bhala"	Kishore Kumar
"Waqt Waqt Ki Baat Hai"	Kishore Kumar
"Jhuk Gayi Aankhen Teri Raahon Pe"	Kishore Kumar, Lata Mangeshkar
"Kaali Kaali Raaton Mein"	Asha Bhosle
"Kal Ki Fikar Karega Jo"	Asha Bhosle
