= Mrs. Winterbourne =

- Theatrical release poster
- Directed by: Richard Benjamin
- Screenplay by: Phoef Sutton; Lisa-Maria Radano
- Based on: I Married a Dead Man by Cornell Woolrich
- Produced by: Oren Koules; Dale Pollock; Ross Canter
- Starring: Shirley MacLaine; Ricki Lake; Brendan Fraser; Miguel Sandoval; Loren Dean
- Cinematography: Alex Nepomniaschy
- Edited by: Jacqueline Cambas; William Fletcher
- Music by: Patrick Doyle
- Production company: A&M Films
- Distributed by: TriStar Pictures
- Release date: April 19, 1996
- Running time: 105 minutes
- Country: United States
- Language: English
- Budget: $25 million
- Box office: $10,082,005

Mrs. Winterbourne is a 1996 American romantic comedy-drama film starring Shirley MacLaine, Ricki Lake, and Brendan Fraser. It is loosely based on Cornell Woolrich's novel I Married a Dead Man, which had already been filmed in Hollywood as No Man of Her Own (1950) starring Barbara Stanwyck, in Hindi as Kati Patang (1970) starring Asha Parekh, and in French as J'ai épousé une ombre (1983). The film was shot on location in and around Boston, Beverly Farms/Prides Crossing, Massachusetts, Toronto, Ontario including Eaton Hall in King City, Ontario. It was the final production of A&M Films.

== Plot ==
On her 18th birthday, Connie Doyle meets lowlife Steve DeCunzo. She moves in with him and winds up pregnant. He kicks her out when she won't abort the baby. Months later, a destitute Connie gets inadvertently swept aboard a train at Grand Central Terminal. With no ticket and no money, she is rescued by Hugh Winterbourne, who takes her to his private compartment. She meets his wife, Patricia, who is also pregnant. Patricia and Connie bond, and Patricia shows Connie her wedding band, which has the couple's names engraved on the inside. Patricia encourages Connie to try the ring on. The train soon crashes.

Eight days later, Connie wakes up in the hospital to discover that she has given birth to a boy. She was found in the Winterbournes’ sleeper car wearing the wedding band and has been mistaken for Patricia. She also learns "the other pregnant woman on the train" (Patricia, mistaken for Connie) and Hugh died in the crash. Hugh's mother, Grace, who has a bad heart, had never met Patricia, and assumes Connie is her. Grace calls asking Connie to come to the Winterbourne estate. With nowhere else to go, Connie accepts the offer and is driven there by Paco, the chauffeur. There, she meets Bill, Hugh's identical twin brother. When the shock of seeing the twin of the man she is claiming as her deceased husband wears off, she nervously begins her new life. She names her son Hughie, after his supposed father.

Meanwhile, the police tell Steve that Connie and his unborn baby have died. Steve doesn't seem to care, which disturbs his new girlfriend.

Bill questions Connie closely, suspicious of inconsistencies in her story. Annoyed, Grace forces Connie on Bill one day, and they walk around Boston and begin to bond. During the day, Connie accidentally signs her real name, which Bill notices. He investigates, learning her real identity. Bill prepares to expose Connie when he learns that Grace plans to change her will to include Connie and baby Hughie. However, he changes his mind when Connie begs Grace not to include her and Hughie in the will, proving to him that she is not after the family's money. Bill and Connie are called to help a drunk Paco, heart-broken from a failed romance, to his bed. He demands that Bill and Connie dance a tango before he will fall asleep. They do so and share several kisses.

Connie receives an anonymous letter asking "Who are you? And whose baby is that?" She has been feeling guilty for taking advantage of Grace's kindness but worries that any revelation of the truth would endanger Grace's life. Connie decides to leave with Hughie and is found packing by Bill. He tries to convince her to stay, proposing to her. Connie decides to run away anyway. Paco follows her to the train station, tells her about his own shady past, and makes her realize that she and the baby are as valuable to Grace as Grace is to them. Connie returns home to find that Grace has had a heart attack because of her disappearance. She and Grace talk about Bill's proposal, and Grace tells Connie to never take the baby away again. Connie decides to accept the situation and agrees to marry Bill as Patricia Winterbourne.

Steve saw a publicity shot of Connie as Patricia and sent her the letter. He blackmails her to meet with him, or he will go to Grace. Grace, seeing Connie's distress from afar, sends Paco after Steve as he leaves to discover his identity. At Steve's motel, Connie writes him a check to leave her and the baby alone, but Steve only wants it to force her into a worse scheme - pretending to kidnap Hughie, ransoming him back. Connie returns to the estate and steals a pistol from a display case, then returns to the motel to frighten Steve into returning the incriminating check. She does not at first realize that Steve is already dead, and the pistol accidentally goes off when she finds out. Bill rushes in on the echo of the gunshot, and both Bill and Connie deny causing Steve's death. Connie begins to tell Bill about the lie she has been living, but Bill reveals that he already knows Connie's true identity and loves her anyway.

The next day, their wedding day, the priest tells Bill and Connie that Grace is outside the church, confessing to Steve's murder to the police lieutenant who came asking for Patricia Winterbourne. They rush to Grace's side, and each confesses to the murder themselves, trying to shield the others.

The police officers tell them they already have the murderer in custody: the woman Steve started seeing after dumping Connie. Like Connie, she had gotten pregnant and Steve had abandoned her.

Connie confesses the truth about Hughie's parentage to Grace, who says she'll still accept Connie and Hughie. The wedding goes ahead, and Bill presents Connie with a wedding ring that has 'Bill & Connie' engraved on the inside.

== Cast ==
- Shirley MacLaine as Grace Winterbourne
- Ricki Lake as Connie Doyle/"Patricia Winterbourne"
- Brendan Fraser as Bill and Hugh Winterbourne
- Miguel Sandoval as Paco
- Loren Dean as Steve DeCunzo
- Peter Gerety as Father Brian Kilraine
- Justin Vanlieshout as Baby Hughie Winterbourne
- Jane Krakowski as Christine
- Debra Monk as Lieutenant Ambrose
- Cathryn de Prume as Renee
- Susan Haskell as Patricia Winterbourne
- Bobcat Goldthwait (uncredited) as TV comedian
- Paula Prentiss (uncredited) as Maternity nurse
- Alec Thomilson as Baby Hughie Winterbourne

== Reception ==
Mrs. Winterbourne received generally negative reviews; on Rotten Tomatoes, the film holds a 15% "Rotten" rating from 33 reviews (5 "fresh" reviews, 28 "rotten"). Audiences polled by CinemaScore gave the film an average grade of "B" on an A+ to F scale. It was also a box office failure, grossing only $10,082,005 based on a $25 million budget.
