= Anita Gershman =

American film producer

- Occupation: Film producer

Anita Gershman is an American film producer who has produced films since 1999.

== Executive producer filmography ==
- Rain (2003)
- Perilous (2002) (TV)
- Blind Obsession (2002)
- Face Value (2002)
- Night Class (2002)
- On the Borderline (2001)
- Facing the Enemy (2001)
- Living in Fear (2001)
- Spirit (2001) (TV)
- Above & Beyond (2001)
- Malpractice (2001)
- A Mother's Testimony (2001) (TV)
- The Perfect Wife (2001) (TV)
- She's No Angel (2001) (TV)
- Can't Be Heaven (2000)
- The Stepdaughter (2000)
- Above Suspicion (2000)
- Alone with a Stranger (2000)
- The Perfect Nanny (2000)
- Rites of Passage (1999)
- Time Served (1999)
- Her Married Lover (1999)
- Stranger in My House (1999)
