= Gudia (1997 film) =

1997 film

- Directed by: Gautam Ghose
- Written by: Ain Rasheed Khan
- Produced by: Amit Khanna
- Starring: Mithun Chakraborty
- Cinematography: Gautam Ghose
- Edited by: Moloy Banerjee
- Music by: Gautam Ghose; Arthur Gracius
- Production company: PLUS Films
- Release date: May 1997
- Running time: 139 minutes
- Country: India
- Language: Hindi

Gudia is a 1997 Indian drama film directed by Gautam Ghose. It was screened in the Un Certain Regard section at the 1997 Cannes Film Festival. It won the National Film Award for Best Feature film in Hindi. It is based on a short story of Mahasweta Devi.

== Plot ==
It is the story of a ventriloquist (Mithun Chakraborty), his life and love.

Johnny is a popular singer and musician(Mithun Chakraborty). The star of his show is a talking doll named Urvashi, who resembles a beautiful woman. The singer is so protective of his doll that he despairs when it is destroyed by ruthless enemies. To help Johnny, his girlfriend, Rosemary, decides to take the stage in the doll's place.

== Cast ==
- Mithun Chakraborty as John Mendes
- Nandana Sen as Rosemary Braganza / Urvashi
- Pran as Hameed
- Mohan Agashe as Braganza
- Masood Akhtar as Munna Bhai
- Tiku Talsania
- Avtar Gill as Politician
- Anjan Srivastav as Rosemary's boss
