= Chakkar Pe Chakkar =

- Directed by: Ashok Roy
- Screenplay by: Verma Malik; Charandas Shokh (also dialogues); Suridh Kar
- Story by: Amit Khanna
- Produced by: Ashok Roy
- Starring: Shashi Kapoor; Rekha; Pran; Amjad Khan
- Cinematography: Nando Bhattacharya
- Edited by: Bal Korde
- Music by: Kalyanji–Anandji
- Release date: 1977
- Country: India
- Language: Hindi

Chakkar Pe Chakkar is a 1977 Bollywood romantic comedy film directed by Ashok Roy. The film stars Shashi Kapoor and Rekha.

== Storyline ==
Bollywood Producer, Mani Babu, films a movie starring popular actor, Ravi Kumar, in order to expose Swami Hari Om. When a shot calls for Ravi to kill a child, he refuses, both argue, and subsequently Babu's wife finds her husband knifed to death with Ravi holding the weapon. Before the arrival of the police, Ravi flees but is captured by Daku Sher Singh's men, but is later released and befriended as they turn out to be his fans. Ravi's death is arranged, and the entire gang dons various guises in order to try and locate the real killer(s). Things get complicated after Swami Hari Om finds out Ravi is alive; abducts Ravi's mom and sweetheart, Sheila. The question remains what will Ravi do under these circumstances?

== Cast ==
- Shashi Kapoor as Ravi Kumar
- Rekha as Sheila Sahini
- Raza Murad as Mani Babu
- Pran as Sher Singh
- Madan Puri as Swami Hari Om
- Lalita Pawar as Mrs Kumar
- Bindu as Munnibai
- Bhagwan Dada as Bhagwanbhai
- G. Asrani as Murlidhar Mudaliar Rao
- Amjad Khan as Avdhutt
- Kumari Naaz as Mrs Babu
- Ram Mohan as Daku
- Rajan Haksar as Police Inspector
- Sudhir as Sudhir

== Music ==
All songs were composed by Kalyanji–Anandji.

No.	Song title	Singer
1	"Kahan Kahan Kis Kis Din Kis Kis Waqt Pe Aaoge"	Kishore Kumar, Asha Bhosle
2	"Hum Dil Ke Sachche Baat Ke Pakke, Chakkar Pe Chakkar Kha Jaaye"	Kishore Kumar, Mohammed Rafi
3	"Nigahon Ka Adaaon Ka Wafaaon Ka Jafaaon Ka, Kaun Sa Teer Chalaun"	Asha Bhosle
4	"Sone Ki Kataari Ya Chandi Ki Ya Pital Ki, Kataari Phir Bhi Kataari Hai"	Manna Dey, Asha Bhosle
5	"Toot Paaini Marjaani Jawaani Kyun Aayi, Mera Galiyon Mein Aana Jaana Bandh Ho Gaya"	Asha Bhosle
