= Anurodh =

- Poster
- Directed by: Shakti Samanta
- Screenplay by: Din Dayal Sharma
- Produced by: Girija Samanta
- Starring: Rajesh Khanna; Simple Kapadia; Vinod Mehra; Ashok Kumar; Nirupa Roy; Asrani; Preeti Ganguly; Dina Pathak; Utpal Dutt
- Cinematography: Aloke Dasgupta
- Edited by: Bijoy Chowdhary
- Music by: Laxmikant Pyarelal; Anand Bakshi (lyrics)
- Production company: Samanta Enterprises
- Release date: 11 February 1977
- Country: India
- Language: Hindi

Anurodh (English: Request) is a 1977 Hindi-language musical drama film directed by Shakti Samanta. Produced by Girija Samanta under the banner of Samanta Enterprises, the film is a remake of the 1963 Bengali film Deya Neya.

The film stars Rajesh Khanna, Vinod Mehra, Simple Kapadia who made her debut, Rita Bhaduri, Ashok Kumar, Asrani, Asit Sen Utpal Dutt and Nirupa Roy. The music of the film is by Laxmikant Pyarelal. The movie revolves around a rich city boy (played by Khanna), who aspires to be a musician against his father's wishes and assumes a different identity to sing for a radio station, while his songs are written by a poor friend (played by Mehra).

Pyarelal quoted in an interview "Rajesh Khanna had great interest in music and a terrific sense of melody too. His music is dominated by Pancham (R. D. Burman) and we accepted Shakti Samanta's Anurodh only because Rajesh Khanna had some misunderstanding with Pancham then and did not want to work with him." Director Shakti Samanta said that although the film had an "interesting story", he felt that audiences could not accept the leading man, Rajesh Khanna, doing romantic scenes with his real-life wife Dimple Kapadia's sister Simple Kapadia.

== Plot ==
Arun was the only son of a rich businessman Mr. Chaudhury. He was an upcoming singer, who sang in local radio mostly the songs written by his friend Shrikant. His father wants him to look after their family business and thinks singing is not the kind of job for people of their status. This always leads to friction between father and son. On the other end, Shrikant leads a very poor lifestyle along with his widowed mother. He earns a living by writing songs and articles. Arun frequently helps them with money as Shrikant becomes chronically ill and couldn't work outside.

While things are like this, one day Arun fights with his father and decides to leave his house for Calcutta (presently Kolkata). He joins as a singer there in local radio and works as a driver in the house of Mr. Mathur. He uses name Sanjay Kumar to hide his identity. Mathur lives along with his grandchild Sunita. He lost his son in a war and can't find the whereabouts of his daughter-in-law and grandson for which he continuously organizes searches. Arun grows close with Sunita, headstrong granddaughter of Mathur. Sunita admires Sanjay Kumar without knowing that he and Arun are one and the same. Mathur learns that Arun was the escaped son of his friend Chaudhury and informs him regarding Arun's whereabouts.

Meanwhile, Shrikant becomes critically ill and doctors diagnose it as end stage tuberculosis. His mother comes to Calcutta along with him. Arun gets shocked to see Shrikant like that and swears to save him anyway. He decides to organize a stage show though he decides not to do it till the last minute. He sings on a stage and earns enough money for the operation. The surgeon recognizes Shrikant's mother as the lost daughter-in-law of Mathur and informs him. Srikant's operation becomes a success and he gets reunited with his grandfather. Arun's parents come to Calcutta to see how their son became famous and his father changes his opinions regarding singing. At the end, everyone reconciles and Sunita and Arun marry.

== Cast ==
- Rajesh Khanna as Arun Choudhury / Sanjay Kumar / Pritam Nath Ghayal
- Simple Kapadia as Sunita Mathur
- Ashok Kumar as Ramesh Chandra Mathur
- Vinod Mehra as Shrikant Mathur
- Nirupa Roy as Radha Mathur
- Utpal Dutt as R.K. Choudhary
- Dina Pathak as Sushma Choudhary
- Rita Bhaduri as Anju
- Preeti Ganguly as Manjeet
- Asrani as Bhishan Singh
- Asit Sen as Saxena (Radio Station Manager)
- Jankidas as Mr.Sharma
- Raj Kishore as Mahir Lucknowi
- Amol Sen as Pooran singh
- Birbal as Veera
- Mrinal Mukherjee as Anand Mathur
- Abhi Bhattacharya as Dr.Sen
- Subroto Mahapatra as Bholuram, Sunita's driver
- Amar Nath as Guptaji

== Soundtrack ==
All lyrics are given by Anand Bakshi and composed by Laxmikant Pyarelal.

#	Title	Singer(s)	Raga
1	"Aapke Anurodh Pe"	Kishore Kumar	Yaman Kalyan
2	"Aate Jate Khoobsurat Awara"	Kishore Kumar	
3	"Mere Dil Ne Tadap Ke"	Kishore Kumar	
4	"Jab Dard Nahin Tha"	Kishore Kumar	
5	"Tum Besahara Ho" (Happy)	Manna Dey	
6	"Tum Besahara Ho" (Sad)	Manna Dey	

Kishore Kumar got nominated for the song Aapke Anurodh Pe at Filmfare Awards but lost to Mohammad Rafi for Kya Hua Tera Wada.

== Reception ==
It received five out of five in the Bollywood guide Collections. The film's music became popular, especially the song Aapke Anurodh Pe sung by Kishore Kumar. Aate Jaate Khoobsurat and Jab Dard Nahi Tha, sung by Kishore Kumar, were also memorable.

Kishore Kumar was nominated for Filmfare Award for Best Male Playback Singer for the song Aapke Anurodh Pe and Vinod Mehra for Filmfare Award for Best Supporting Actor.
