= Alag Alag =

1985 Indian film by Shakti Samanta

- Poster
- Directed by: Shakti Samanta
- Written by: Sachin Bhowmick; Ehsan Rizvi
- Produced by: Rajesh Khanna; Kusum Nirula
- Starring: Shashi Kapoor; Rajesh Khanna; Tina Munim; Om Prakash; Deven Verma; Bindu; Om Shivpuri
- Cinematography: Nadeem Khan
- Music by: R. D. Burman
- Production company: Aashirwad Films
- Release date: 27 September 1985
- Running time: 100 minutes
- Country: India
- Language: Hindi

Alag Alag (lit. 'Different Different') is a 1985 Indian Hindi-language romantic drama film directed by Shakti Samanta and produced by Rajesh Khanna. It stars Khanna, Shashi Kapoor and Tina Munim in the lead roles. The film is best remembered for its unique storyline and its shooting locations in Jammu and Kashmir.

It is a remake of the 1982 Pakistani film Meharbani by Parvez Malik. Ram Awatar Agnihotri wrote that it was in this film that Munim showed the "first sparks" of the dedicated actress she would become.

== Plot ==
Chandni is from a poor family who desires to escape poverty. Finding that one shortcut to become rich is to marry a rich man, she sets off to Bombay. She meets a man whose stands near a car, assumes he is rich and asks him to marry her. When she finds out that he is not a rich man, she dumps him immediately. The man is actually Neeraj, who aims to become a playback singer in films. He goes to every studio to meet musicians, but he does not succeed. Chandni lands in a bunglaw to escape from a goon. She plans to settle in the house and requests owner Doctor Rana to let her stay in the house. Dr. Rana finds Chandni is an innocent village girl and allows her to live in his house. Chandni takes charge of the home and dismisses the servants which annoys Rana. But he feels good about the presence of woman in his home after his wife's death.

Neeraj attempts to get recommendation from a social worker whose brother is a musician. He poses as a lame person to her but gets caught when he goes to treatment to Dr. Rana as Chandni exposes him. Neeraj gets angry at her and vows to ruin her plans, which scares Chandni. Chandni plans to make Dr. Rana propose marriage to her. Neeraj gets frustrated at his failed attempts to be a singer. He meets a famous film actress Sarita and requests her for a chance. Saritha invites him and he agrees. Sarita actually plans to marry him and not help with his ambitions. When Neeraj finds out, he leaves angrily. He realises that the reason is that he loves Chandni. Dr. Rana finds that Chandni is a good singer and makes her to change into a fashionable woman. Neeraj proposes to Chandni, but she refuses as she wants to marry a rich man. Neeraj repeatedly attempts to win her love and finally Chandni accepts him. Chandni finds that Dr. Rana actually has loved her as his daughter and feels bad for her immature behaviour.

Neeraj manages to get a chance to sing and re-unites with his rich parents. While on his way to meet Chandni, he meets with an accident and loses his voice. Dr. Rana dies of illness and Chandni is again back to her old life. When Chandni meets Neeraj on the road, he leaves, unwilling to be a burden for Chandni, but Chandni believes that Neeraj dumped her because she is poor. Neeraj decides to make Chandni a playback singer and supports her without revealing himself with the help of his mother. As expected, Chandni becomes a famous singer but she hates Neeraj for leaving her. The rest of the film deals with whether Chandni learns the truth about Neeraj and if he will get his voice back.

== Cast ==
- Shashi Kapoor as Doctor Rana
- Rajesh Khanna as Neeraj
- Tina Munim as Chandni
- Om Prakash as Khan
- Deven Verma as Karim
- Gita Siddharth as Begum
- Bindu as Sarita
- Rajesh Puri as Sarita's secretary
- Bharat Bhushan
- Om Shivpuri as Mirza
- Sushma Sethas Neeraj's mom

== Music ==
Kishore Kumar did not accept any money from Rajesh Khanna for rendering the songs of this film. When Khanna asked why he would not accept, Kumar replied that he had got a fresh lease of life as a singer with Aradhana (1969) and since this was Khanna's first film as producer, he had no right to accept any money.The song Kabhi Bekasi ne Mara was reused in Dhurandhar: The Revenge.

All lyrics are by Anand Bakshi and all music is by R. D. Burman.

1. "Kuch Humko Tumse Kehna Hai" - Kishore Kumar, Lata Mangeshkar (based on Bhairavi raga)
2. "Kabhi Bekasi Ne Mara" - Kishore Kumar (based on the Darbari Kanada raga)
3. "Kagaz Kalam Dawaat" - Kishore Kumar, Lata Mangeshkar
4. "Dil Mein Aag Lagaye" - Kishore Kumar
5. "Dil Mein Aag Lagaye" (duet) - Kishore Kumar, Lata Mangeshkar
6. "Jeevan Ki Yehi Hai Kahani" - Lata Mangeshkar
7. "Jeevan Ki Yehi Hai Kahani" (sad) - Lata Mangeshkar
8. "Raam Rahim mein Antar Naahin" - Asha Bhosle, K. J. Yesudas
9. "Roop Tera Mastana" - Kavita Krishnamurthy
