= Tina Ambani =

Indian actress (born 1957)

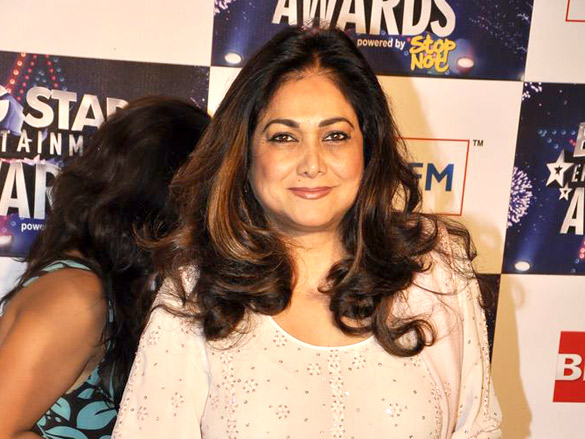
- Ambani in 2012
- Born: Nivruti Nandkumar Munim; 11 February 1957 (age 69); Bombay, India
- Occupations: Actress, activist, philanthropist
- Years active: 1975–1991
- Notable credit(s): Chairperson Kokilaben Dhirubhai Ambani Hospital, Harmony for Silvers Foundation, Harmony Art Foundation, Group CSR, Reliance Group
- Title: Femina Teen Princess 1975
- Spouse: Anil Ambani (m. 1991)
- Partners: Rajesh Khanna (1984–1987)
- Children: 2
- Relatives: Dhirubhai Ambani (father-in-law); Mukesh Ambani (brother-in-law)

Tina Anil Ambani (born Nivruti Nandkumar Munim; 11 February 1957) is an Indian former actress. She is married to Anil Ambani, chairman of Reliance Group.

== Personal life ==
Tina Nandkumar Munim was born on 11 February 1957 in Bombay. She graduated from high school in 1975 from the MM Pupils Own School in Khar. The same year, she was crowned Femina Teen Princess India 1975 and represented India at the Miss Teenage Intercontinental contest in Aruba, where she was crowned second runner-up. She subsequently enrolled in Jai Hind College for a degree in arts. Later in the 70s, she joined the Hindi film industry and had a successful career as a leading actress for thirteen years.

She was in a relationship with her co-star Rajesh Khanna from 1984 to 1987. On 2 February 1991, she married Anil Ambani, the younger son of Indian business tycoon Dhirubhai Ambani who founded Reliance Industries. They have two sons, Jai Anmol (born in December 1991) and Jai Anshul (born in September 1995). The eldest, Jai Anmol, married Khrisha Shah on 20 February 2022. Tina's brother-in-law is Asia's richest man, Mukesh Ambani who is the chairman, managing director, and largest shareholder of Reliance Industries Ltd (RIL).

== Career ==
=== Films ===
Munim made her debut in Hindi films with filmmaker Dev Anand's Des Pardes. Her other films with Dev Anand include Lootmaar, and Man Pasand. She was cast opposite Amol Palekar in Basu Chatterjee's Baaton Baaton Mein. Her notable films with Rishi Kapoor include Karz, and Yeh Vaada Raha.She starred with actor Rajesh Khanna in many films including Fiffty Fiffty, Souten, Bewafai, Suraag, Insaaf Main Karoonga, Rajput, Aakhir Kyon?, Paapi Pet Ka Sawaal Hai, Alag Alag, and Adhikar. She also starred in hits like Bhagwaan Dada with Rajinikanth and Yudh with Jackie Shroff. Her last film was Jigarwala, released in 1991. In an interview with Simi Garewal, Munim said: "Sometimes I feel [that I left films too soon] too, but then I felt that there was a lot more to the world that I wanted to explore and experience, and not just stick to movies. I decided to quit. I never regretted it. I never wanted to go back, ever."

=== Arts and culture ===
With the aim to offer young artists a platform to exhibit alongside seasoned veterans and acknowledged masters, she organised the first Harmony Art show in 1995. In 2008, Harmony Art Foundation showcased upcoming Indian artists at Christie's in London, drawing attention to the wealth of talent in India. She has served on the board of trustees of the Peabody Essex Museum in Salem, Massachusetts, which is the oldest continually operating museum in the US since 2008.

In addition, she has served on the advisory board of the National Gallery of Modern Art, Mumbai and the National Institute of Design, Ahmedabad. She was also nominated to the reconstituted General Assembly of the Indian Council for Cultural Relations (ICCR). She has been actively associated with several welfare activities such as Aseema, an NGO engaged in the rehabilitation of street children, and the restoration of Elephanta Island, a World Heritage Site near Mumbai, with the Archaeological Survey of India and UNESCO.

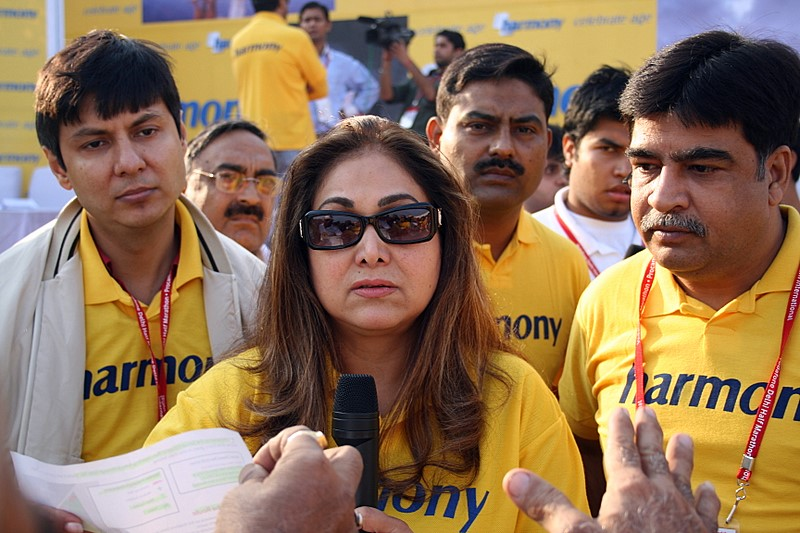
Tina Ambani at a Harmony event in Oct 2007

=== Elder welfare ===
In 2004, Ambani established Harmony for Silvers Foundation, a Mumbai-based non-government organisation that seeks to enhance the quality of life of the elderly. Its activities have included Harmony – Celebrate Age, the magazine, now in its 14th year; the portal www.harmonyindia.org; Harmony Interactive Centre for Silver Citizens, in South Mumbai; the Harmony Research Division; the Harmony Silver Awards; and the Harmony Senior Citizens' Runs at the Mumbai, Delhi and Bengaluru marathons.

=== Healthcare ===
In order to bridge the gaps in Indian healthcare, Ambani launched the Kokilaben Dhirubhai Ambani Hospital & Medical Research Institute (KDAH) in Mumbai in 2009, a quaternary care facility. It is the only hospital in Mumbai to receive accreditation from the JCI (Joint Commission International, USA), NABH (National Accreditation Board for Healthcare, India), CAP (College of American Pathologists, USA) and NABL (National Accreditation Board for Laboratories, India). Other standouts include the first comprehensive centre for liver transplant and the first integrated centre for children's cardiac care in western India; its robotic surgery programme; the centres for rehabilitation and sports medicine; and its initiative to open 18 cancer care centres in rural Maharashtra.

== Filmography ==
Year	Film	Role	Notes
1978	Des Pardes	Gauri	Debut film
1979	Baaton Baaton Mein	Nancy	
1980	Karz	Tina	
1980	Man Pasand	Kamli	
1980	Lootmaar	Neela Ramniklal	
1980	Aap Ke Deewane	Sameera	
1981	Katilon Ke Kaatil	Petty Thief	
1981	Fiffty Fiffty	Mary	
1981	Khuda Kasam	Tina Hukamchand	
1981	Harjaee	Geeta Chopra	
1981	Rocky	Renuka Seth	
1982	Yeh Vaada Raha	Sunita Sikkan/Kusum Mehra	
1982	Rajput	Jaya	
1982	Deedar-E-Yaar	Firdaus Changezi	
1982	Suraag	Guest appearance	
1983	Souten	Rukmini Mohit (Ruku)	
1983	Bade Dil Wala	Rashmi Sinha	
1983	Pukar	Usha	
1984	Sharara	Rashmi	
1984	Karishmaa	Radha	
1984	Wanted: Dead or Alive	Neeta	
1984	Aasmaan		
1984	Paapi Pet Ka Sawaal Hai	Shanta	
1985	Alag Alag	Chandni	
1985	Insaaf Main Karoonga	Seema Khanna	
1985	Aakhir Kyon?	Indu Sharma	
1985	Bewafai	Asha	
1985	Yudh	Anita/Rita	
1986	Samay Ki Dhaara	Rashmi Verma	
1986	Bhagwaan Dada	Madhu	
1986	Adhikar	Jyoti	
1987	Kamagni	Megha	
1987	Muqaddar Ka Faisla	Nisha	
1988	7 Bijliyaan		
1991	Jigarwala	Sohni	Final film/Delayed release

Awards and achievements
Preceded by Radha Bartake	Miss Teenage Intercontinental India; 1975	Succeeded by Kalpana Iyer
Preceded by (Canada) Lisa Langlois	Miss Teenage Intercontinental; 2nd runner up 1975	Succeeded by (Netherlands) Barbara Ann Neefs
