= Shakti Samanta =

Indian film director and producer (1926-2009)

- Born: 13 January 1926; Burdwan, Bengal Presidency, (present-day West Bengal, India)
- Died: 9 April 2009 (aged 83); Mumbai, Maharashtra, India
- Occupations: Film director, film producer
- Years active: 1955–2002
- Title: Founder of Shakti Films (1957)

Shakti Samanta (13 January 1926 – 9 April 2009) was an Indian film director and producer, who founded Shakti Films in 1957, which is most known for films such as Anand Ashram (1977), Anusandhan /Barsaat Ki Ek Raat (1981), Anyay Abichar (1985), Howrah Bridge (1958), Insan Jaag Utha (1959), China Town (1962), Kashmir Ki Kali (1964), An Evening in Paris (1967), Aradhana (1969), Kati Patang (1971), and Amar Prem (1972), Amanush (1975).

He received Filmfare Awards for Best Film for Aradhana (1969), Anuraag (1973) and Amanush (1975), which was also made in Bengali, a language in which he made six films, including an Indo-Bangladesh joint production in 1984.

== Early life and education ==
He was born in the village of Bokra (post office: Raina), in the district of Purba Bardhaman, in the Bengal Presidency of India He received his education at Dehradun, staying with his uncle. He graduated in 1944 from Calcutta University.

== Career ==
After completing his education he wanted to become an actor in the Hindi film industry at Bombay, so moved closer to the city. He took a school teacher's job in Dapoli, about 200 kilometres from Mumbai. Shakti Samanta actually wanted to be a playback singer in the beginning. Around 1947, he went to S.D. Burman for an audition. After listening to him Burman told him that he could give him a role in a chorus song, but not in a solo song. So he shifted his energies elsewhere. He eventually joined the film industry in 1948 as an assistant director starting with Satish Nigam in Raj Kapoor starrer Sunhere Din, subsequently he worked with directors like Gyan Mukherjee, and Phani Majumdar at Bombay Talkies, in Tamasha, Baadbaan and Dhobi Doctor.

Eventually he got his break as an independent director when Samanta directed his first feature film, Bahu in 1954, starring Karan Dewan, Usha Kiron, Shashikala and Pran and after the success for his next few films, Inspector (1956), Sheroo (1956), Detective (1957) and Hill Station (1957), he started his own production company, Shakti Films, in 1957, and the first release of his independent banner was the murder-mystery Howrah Bridge, with Ashok Kumar and Madhubala as the lead, with its crooning number 'Aaiye Meherbaan' with music by O. P. Nayyar, sung by Asha Bhosle in a notable Geeta Dutt style, and picturised on Madhubala became a rage, and the film a breakthrough hit; this was a turning point. With Insaan Jaag Utha (1959) starring Sunil Dutt and Madhubala, he wanted to shift to making films on social themes, but when it was unsuccessful, he shifted back to making entertainers for another decade, for returning to social themes, with Aradhana (1969).

In all, Samanta directed 43 feature films, including 37 Hindi, and 6 Bengali films. His best known films include Howrah Bridge, China Town, Kashmir Ki Kali, Sawan Ki Ghata and An Evening in Paris. He is credited for starting the trend of making double version films in Hindi and Bengali with Amanush in 1974, and also made the first co-produced film between India and Bangladesh in 1984.

Samanta was among the directors who worked with Shammi Kapoor in the late 1950s and up to the mid '60s, then with Sharmila Tagore, Rajesh Khanna, creating a number of classics such as Aradhana, Kati Patang, Anurodh and Amar Prem. However, his movies with Amitabh Bachchan were not major hits.

On some of his films, his brother and wife were producers. He also produced some of the films that his son, Ashim Samanta, directed. In 1985, Shakti Films established 'Aradhana Sound Service', a digital audio post-production facility which works both for Bollywood as well as Hollywood films.

Samanta died of cardiac arrest at his suburban Santa Cruz residence at approximately 5pm on 9 April 2009, while undergoing physiotherapy. He was recovering from a stroke he had suffered two months ago.

== Legacy ==
Three of his classics, Howrah Bridge, Aradhana and Barsaat Ki Ek Raat, starring Amitabh Bachchan and Raakhee, are to be turned into animation films by 'Pritish Nandy Communications'

== Awards and recognition ==
Samanta received Filmfare Awards for "Best Film" for Aradhana, Anuraag and Amanush. He has also received several Lifetime Achievement awards, including the Zee Cine Award for Lifetime Achievement in 2002 and several other awards from Zee and other Indian organisations. Some of his films have been shown at international festivals in Berlin, Tashkent, Moscow, Cairo and Beirut.

Samanta was President of the Indian Motion Picture Producers' Association for 7 years, Chairman of the Central Board of Film Certification (CBFC) for 7 years and was Chairman of the Satyajit Ray Film and Television Institute, Kolkata for 2 years.

== Filmography ==
Director

=== Bengali ===
- Amanush (1974)
- Anand Ashram (1977)
- Anusandhan (1981)
- Anyay Abichar (1985)
- Andha Bichar (1990)
- Debdas (2002)

=== Hindi ===
- Bahu (1955)
- Inspector (1956)
- Hill Station (1957)
- Sheroo (1957)
- Howrah Bridge (1958)
- Detective (1958)
- Insan Jaag Utha (1959)
- Jaali Note (1960)
- Singapore (1960)
- Isi Ka Naam Duniya Hai (1962)
- Naughty Boy (1962)
- China Town (1962)
- Ek Raaz (1963)
- Kashmir Ki Kali (1964)
- Sawan Ki Ghata (1966)
- An Evening in Paris (1967)
- Aradhana (1969)
- Kati Patang (1970)
- Pagla Kahin Ka (1970)
- Jaane-Anjaane (1971)
- Amar Prem (1971)
- Anuraag (1972)
- Charitraheen (1974)
- Ajanabee (1974)
- Mehbooba (1976)
- Anurodh (1977)
- The Great Gambler (1979)
- Khwab (1980)
- Barsaat Ki Ek Raat (1981) Hindi and Bengali Bilingual
- Ayaash (1982)
- Awaaz (1984)
- Alag Alag (1985)
- Aar Paar (1985)
- Dushman (1990)
- Geetanjali (1993)

Producer

- Ayeel Basant Bahar (1965)
- Balika Badhu (1976)
- Achena Atithi (1997)
