= Inspector (1956 film) =

- Poster
- Directed by: Shakti Samanta
- Written by: Masood Mashhadi
- Screenplay by: Darogajee
- Story by: S. H. Bihari
- Produced by: A. K. Nadiadwala
- Starring: Ashok Kumar; Geeta Bali; Pran; Mehmood; K. N. Singh
- Cinematography: P. Issac
- Edited by: Dharamvir
- Music by: Hemant Kumar
- Production company: Pushpa Pictures
- Distributed by: Pushpa Pictures
- Release date: 1956
- Running time: 124 minutes
- Country: India
- Language: Hindi

Inspector is a 1956 Indian Hindi-language thriller film directed by Shakti Samanta. It starred Ashok Kumar, Geeta Bali and Pran in lead roles.

== Plot ==
Destiny moulds its own way. When Thakur Mahendra Singh adopted a child, his wife gave him the happy news that she is going to be a mother herself. The adopted son's father Badri, who was known as Thakur's faithful servant, thought of murdering the newly born child. But his wife Ganga stopped him and ran away with the child. Twenty-five years elapsed. But the sins of the father were not left unpunished. It was on the steps of Bijlis Kotha that a murder was committed. Rajkumar did not know how to dispose of the dead body. Badri, now a victoria driver, came to his rescue. He took away the dead body and placed it in a car parked at a lonely place. It was Varsha's car. A happy-go-lucky girl as she was, Varsha found the dead body. She was dumbfounded and thought to inform the police. But a second thought came to her mind and she pulled the dead body up to the road and left it there. A constable, who saw all this informed the Police. Inspector Shyam came to investigate and was surprised to see his own beloved entangled in this case. But the duty of a police officer came first, Varsha was arrested and the investigation went on. How was Varsha proved innocent? How were the criminals punished? How did the Inspector solve the mystery?

== Cast ==
- Ashok Kumar as Shyam
- Geeta Bali as Varsha
- K. N. Singh as Badri Prasad
- Pran as Raj Kumar
- Mehmood as Banarasilal Paanwala
- Nazir Hussain as Thakur Mahendra Singh
- Achala Sachdev as Ganga
- Pratima Devi as Mahendra Singh's Mother

== Music ==
Music of this film is by Hemant Kumar, while the lyrics are by S. H. Bihari.

Song	Singer	Raga
"Dil Chhed Koi Aisa"	Lata Mangeshkar	Jaunpuri
"Itna Mujhe Bata De"	Lata Mangeshkar	
"Mera Akela Jiya Kaise Lage Re Piya"	Lata Mangeshkar, Hemant Kumar	
"Phoolon Ke Haar Le Lo"	Hemant Kumar	
"Dil Chhed Koi Aisa"	Hemant Kumar	Jaunpuri
"Mere Nainon Ki"	Asha Bhosle	
"Dekho Kaisi Suhani"	Asha Bhosle	
"Na Poochho Ki Kiski"	Asha Bhosle	
"Bada Mushkil Hai"	Asha Bhosle	
