= Kati Patang =

1970 film by Shakti Samanta

- Theatrical poster
- Directed by: Shakti Samanta
- Written by: Vrajendra Gaur; Gulshan Nanda
- Based on: Kati Patang by Gulshan Nanda
- Produced by: Shakti Samanta
- Starring: Asha Parekh; Rajesh Khanna; Prem Chopra; Bindu; Nazir Hussain
- Cinematography: V. Gopi Krishna
- Edited by: Govind Dalwadi
- Music by: Rahul Dev Burman
- Production companies: Naini Lake; Nainital Club; Natraj Studios; Ranikhet
- Distributed by: Shakti Films; United Producers
- Release date: 1970
- Country: India
- Language: Hindi
- Box office: ₹4.70 crore

Kati Patang (transl. The Severed Kite) is a 1970 Indian Hindi-language musical drama film produced and directed by Shakti Samanta. The film stars Asha Parekh as a woman pretending to be a widow, and her ensuing trials and tribulations opposite her charming neighbour, played by Rajesh Khanna. It was the sixth highest grossing of the year and Parekh's performance as Madhavi was critically acclaimed and earned her the Filmfare Award for Best Actress. The film also stars Nazir Hussain, Bindu, Prem Chopra, Daisy Irani and Sulochana Latkar.

It was the second in a string of nine films on which Samanta and Khanna collaborated. The music was composed by R.D. Burman and was a huge hit. "Ye Shaam Mastani" and "Pyaar Deewana Hota Hai", sung by Kishore Kumar were particularly famous. The performances from Parekh and Khanna were praised by the audience and critics alike. It was among the 13 consecutive hits of Khanna between 1967 and 1974 and was the third and final film in which he was paired with Parekh.

The film was later remade in Tamil as Nenjil Oru Mull (1981) and in Telugu as Punnami Chandrudu (1987). It is based on Gulshan Nanda's novel of the same name which was an adaptation of Cornell Woolrich's 1948 novel I Married a Dead Man which had earlier been adapted as the 1950 film No Man of Her Own.

== Plot ==
Madhavi "Madhu" is an orphan living with her maternal uncle, who arranges her marriage with someone she does not know. Blinded by her love for a man, Kailash, she runs away on the day of the wedding, only to discover Kailash with another woman, Shabnam. Heartbroken and dejected, she returns to her uncle, who had committed suicide from the humiliation. With no one in her life, Madhavi decides to leave town and head somewhere else. She meets her childhood friend Poonam, who tells her about her husband's untimely demise in an accident and that she is on her way, along with her baby boy Munna, to stay with her in-laws, whom she has never met before. Poonam manages to compel Madhu to accompany her, as her plight is pitiful.

En route, Poonam and Madhu catch up until the train derails and end up in a government hospital. Poonam has lost her limbs. She knows that her end is near, so she makes Madhu promise that she will assume Poonam's identity, bring Munna up, and continue life in Poonam's in-laws' house. Madhu has no choice but to give in to the dying mother's wish. In the downpour on the way, the cabbie attempts to rob her, but Kamal, a forest ranger, rescues her and shelters her until the sky is clear the next day. She learns that Kamal is the very man with whom her marriage was arranged, and he has become an alcoholic due to the failed wedding.

Madhu leaves Kamal's home in shame and reaches Poonam's in-laws. Her father-in-law, Dinanath, and mother-in-law accept her and let her stay there. Kamal keeps visiting the house as he is the son of Dinanath's best friend. Soon, he realizes that he is in love with "Poonam".

Madhu's ill fate brings Kailash to Dinanath's house. He is after their money and is very close to revealing Madhu's identity. To be successful, he impresses all the members of the house, but Poonam takes a dislike to him. Dinanath soon realizes Poonam's true identity and asks for the truth. When he realises what the matter really is, he accepts Madhu and makes her the guardian of the Dinanath property, which will be inherited by Munna. That night, Dinanath is poisoned by Kailash. Mrs. Dinanath accuses Poonam of what has happened, and she is imprisoned.

Now, Shabnam enters the life of the Dinanaths, claiming that she is the real Poonam. Mrs. Dinanath, in rage, sends her away and is ready for no story. Kamal takes a dislike towards Madhu, learning the truth. However, he eventually realizes the truth and gets Shabnam and Kailash arrested for their intentions, and Madhu is freed. When Kamal searches for Madhu, he realizes that she has left without any notice, but a letter for Kamal, stating that she is walking away from his life, and so, he should not try to find her. Kamal starts searching for her and finds her trying to jump from a cliff, and stops her by singing a song. They hug.

== Cast ==
- Asha Parekh as Madhavi "Madhu" / [Fake] Poonam
- Rajesh Khanna as Kamal Sinha
- Prem Chopra as Kailash
- Bindu as Shabnam "Shaboo"
- Nazir Hussain as Diwan Dinanath
- Madan Puri as Kamal's father
- Sulochana Latkar as Mrs. Dinanath
- Chandrashekhar as Police Inspector Tiwari
- Satyen Kappu as Dr. Kashinath
- Daisy Irani as Ramaya
- Mehmood Jr. as Sheetu, Ramaya's brother

== Production ==
Kati Patang was adapted from a novel of the same name by Gulshan Nanda. The novel and the film's story, also written by Nanda, were based on the 1948 novel I Married a Dead Man, by Cornell Woolrich and had been previously made into the American film No Man of Her Own (1950) starring Barbara Stanwyck. The novel was also later adapted in Japan as Shisha to no Kekkon (1960) by Osamu Takahashi, in Brazil as the TV miniseries A Intrusa (1962), in French as J'ai épousé une ombre (I Married a Shadow; 1983) and again in the US as Mrs. Winterbourne (1996).

Shakti Samanta has stated that he offered the film to Sharmila Tagore first but she was pregnant. It was then he signed Asha Parekh, he was "confident" that he could extract a "convincing performance from her." He had cast her in his earlier film, Pagla Kahin Ka (1970).

== Music ==
Kati Patang

Soundtrack album by R. D. Burman
- Released: December 01, 1970
- Recorded: 1970
- Genre: Feature Film Soundtrack
- Length: 28:01
- Language: Hindi
- Label: Saregama
- Director: Shakti Samanta
- Producer: Shakti Samanta

R. D. Burman chronology
Puraskar (1970)	Kati Patang (1970)	The Train (1970)

The music was composed by Rahul Dev Burman and the lyrics were penned by Anand Bakshi. The songs sung by Kishore Kumar for Rajesh Khanna were the reason for the film's success, while Mukesh got to sing a number for the latter – a rare combination. Asha Bhosle performed "Mera Naam Hai Shabnam" in the talk-sung style of Rex Harrison in My Fair Lady (1964) (and thus often incorrectly dubbed "the first Hindi rap number").

=== Soundtrack ===
Track	Song	Singer(s)	Picturized on	Duration
1	"Yeh Shaam Mastani"	Kishore Kumar	Rajesh Khanna and Asha Parekh	4:07
2	"Pyaar Deewana Hota Hai"	Kishore Kumar	Rajesh Khanna and Asha Parekh	4:30
3	"Yeh Jo Mohabbat Hai"	Kishore Kumar	Rajesh Khanna	3:36
4	"Aaj Na Chodenge"	Kishore Kumar, Lata Mangeshkar	Asha Parekh and Rajesh Khanna	4:55
5	"Mera Naam Hai Shabnam"	Asha Bhosle, R. D. Burman	Bindu	3:05
6	"Jis Gali Mein Tera Ghar"	Mukesh	Rajesh Khanna and Asha Parekh	3:40
7	"Na Koi Umang Hai"	Lata Mangeshkar	Asha Parekh	3:07

== Box office ==
The film was successful at the box office, becoming the sixth highest-grossing Bollywood film of 1971.

According to The Hindu, "On screen, Rajesh Khanna never appeared to be lip-syncing. So convincing were his expressions. His presence, backed by the music, remained the main source of strength for a movie's success".

== Awards and nominations ==
19th Filmfare Awards:

Won

- Best Actress – Asha Parekh

Nominated

- Best Director – Shakti Samanta
- Best Actor – Rajesh Khanna
- Best Lyricist – Anand Bakshi – "Na Koi Umang Hai"
- Best Male Playback Singer – Kishore Kumar – "Yeh Jo Mohabbat Hai"
- Best Story – Gulshan Nanda

== See also ==
- Mrs. Winterbourne
