= Indian Broadcasting & Digital Foundation =

Indian television organisation

- Purpose: Representing Television Broadcasters and OTT platforms
- Headquarters: New Delhi
- Region served: India
- Key people: Vikramjit Sen; Head of Broadcasting content complaints council (Appointed in 2017)
- Main organ: Broadcasting Content Complaints Council
- Affiliations: Indian Television Industry
- Website: https://www.ibdf.com/
- Formerly called: Indian Broadcasting Foundation

Indian Broadcasting & Digital Foundation also known as (IBDF) (previously Indian Broadcasting Foundation) is an unified representative body of the television broadcasters and OTT platforms in India. The organisation was founded in the year 1999. Over 250 Indian television channels are associated with it. The organisation is credited as the spokesman of India Broadcasting Industry.

== Objectives ==
The IBDF is the parent organisation of the Broadcasting Content Complaints Council (BCCC) which was set up in the year 2011. The BCCC examines content-related complaints relating to all non-news general entertainment channels in India.
