= I Married a Dead Man =

1948 novel by Cornell Woolrich

- First edition
- Author: Cornell Woolrich
- Language: English
- Publisher: Lippincott
- Publication date: 1948
- Publication place: United States

I Married a Dead Man is a 1948 novel by American crime writer Cornell Woolrich under the pseudonym William Irish.

== Plot ==
Eight months pregnant and alone, Helen Georgesson's only hope is the five dollar bill and the train ticket back to her home town in San Francisco. On the train she befriends newlyweds Patrice and Hugh Hazzard. Tragedy strikes and the train crashes, killing both the Hazzards instantly. When Helen awakes in hospital she discovers she has given birth in the wreckage, and that she has been mistaken for Patrice. On finding out Hugh's family are wealthy and never met the real Patrice, Helen decides to go along with the misunderstanding for the sake of her son.

The Hazzards don't suspect a thing and Helen and her son settle into their new life without a hitch. Until one day, a letter arrives in the mail, containing a single sentence; "Who are you?"

== Adaptations ==
The novel was adapted in 1950 into a movie directed by Mitchell Leisen called No Man of Her Own, into telenovela Brazilian, A Intrusa in 1962 and another in 1967. Has been the basis for many films over the decades including Kati Patang (1971), the French film J'ai épousé une ombre (1983), Mrs. Winterbourne (1996) and American TV Movie She's No Angel (2001).
