= No Man of Her Own (1950 film) =

American film noir drama

- Theatrical release poster
- Directed by: Mitchell Leisen
- Screenplay by: Sally Benson; Catherine Turney
- Based on: I Married a Dead Man; 1948 novel by Cornell Woolrich
- Produced by: Richard Maibaum
- Starring: Barbara Stanwyck; John Lund; Phyllis Thaxter; Jane Cowl; Lyle Bettger
- Cinematography: Daniel L. Fapp
- Edited by: Alma Macrorie
- Music by: Hugo Friedhofer
- Production company: Paramount Pictures
- Distributed by: Paramount Pictures
- Release date: May 3, 1950
- Running time: 97 minutes
- Country: United States
- Language: English

No Man of Her Own is a 1950 American film noir drama directed by Mitchell Leisen and featuring Barbara Stanwyck, John Lund, Phyllis Thaxter, Jane Cowl and Lyle Bettger. Made and distributed by Paramount Pictures, the production is the second film Stanwyck made with director Mitchell Leisen. Its screenplay was adapted from Cornell Woolrich's 1948 novel I Married a Dead Man. Woolrich is cited in the film's opening credits by one of his commonly used pseudonyms, "William Irish".

== Plot ==
Helen Ferguson, filled with dread, holds her baby as Bill Harkness reads a book. The phone rings, and police tell Bill that they are on the way to their home. She puts the child to bed, praying that the boy will not suffer for her mistakes and whispering that she was desperate.

A year earlier in New York, Helen is eight months pregnant, unmarried, and broke. She goes to her unfaithful boyfriend Stephen Morley, tearfully pleading for help as she stands in the hallway outside his apartment door. He refuses to answer, but slips under the door an envelope for her, one containing a five-dollar bill and a one-way train ticket to San Francisco. Retrieving the envelope, Helen pulls out the ticket, causing the money to fall to the floor, unseen. Helen, humiliated and exhausted, realizes she has no choice but to go to the station and board the train. Helen's train later crashes during the journey, and when she is found by authorities in the wreckage, she is mistaken for another pregnant woman, Patrice Harkness, who was killed in the crash. Helen gives birth to her child in the hospital and is accepted by the Harknesses, the family of the dead woman's husband, Hugh Harkness, who was also killed in the train crash. Since the family has never seen their son's new wife, they believe Helen to be her and, for the sake of her child, she does not reveal her true identity. The family decides her lapses of memory and uncertain behavior are aftereffects of the train wreck. With a better life provided for her son, Helen continues the ruse while Bill Harkness, who is the elder brother of the deceased Hugh, falls in love with her.

Helen's ex-boyfriend, the father of her child, tracks her down several months after the accident. Stephen was called in to identify the body at the morgue after the train accident, but instead of telling the truth, he said that the dead woman was Helen. After figuring out that she is living under an assumed identity and that she has wealthy in-laws, he blackmails Helen into giving him a check for $500 and marrying him. She gets a gun, goes to Stephen's office, where he is living, and finds him dead on his bed but fires the gun at him. Bill comes to the office and helps Helen dispose of the body and conceal evidence of her relationship with Stephen. Bill and his mother have realized that Helen is in trouble and, because they love her regardless of her past, will do anything they can to protect her.

Bill's mother dies of heart failure, but not before writing a letter that she gives to her maid, making her swear to give it to Helen only if police come for her. In the letter, Mrs. Harkness claims to have killed Stephen, which she could not have done. Three months later, when police find his body and the check Helen gave to him, they do come for her. Helen confesses to shooting him, but she is told that her bullet missed him and was found in his mattress, that a bullet of another caliber was found in his body, and that his girlfriend has confessed to shooting him. Bill and Helen embrace.

== Cast ==
=== Credited ===
- Barbara Stanwyck as Helen Ferguson
- John Lund as Bill Harkness
- Jane Cowl as Mrs. Harkness
- Phyllis Thaxter as Patrice Harkness
- Lyle Bettger as Stephen Morley
- Henry O'Neill as Mr. Harkness
- Richard Denning as Hugh Harkness
- Carole Mathews as Blonde
- Harry Antrim as Ty Winthrop
- Catherine Craig as Rosalie Baker
- Esther Dale as Josie
- Milburn Stone as Plainclothesman
- Griff Barnett as Dr. Parker
- Mary Lawrence as Lucy Hunt

=== Uncredited ===
- Georgia Backus as Nurse
- Virginia Brissac as Justice of the Peace's Wife
- Kathleen Freeman as Clara Larrimore
- Helen Mowery as Harriet Olsen
- Reportedly, Stanwyck's brother Malcolm Byron Stevens (1905–1964), a minor actor known as "Bert Stevens", had a role

== Reception ==
In his May 4, 1950 review of the film for The New York Times, Bosley Crowther generally compliments the principal cast's performances, but he pans both the structure and tone of the screenplay itself:

For the fact is that it is...a lurid and artificial tale, loaded with far-fetched situations and deliberate romantic clichés. And the script which Sally Benson and Catherine Turney prepared from a novel by William Irish ("I Married a Dead Man") makes a silly botch of same. This sort of female agonizing, in which morals are irresponsibly confused for the sake of effect, makes diversion for none but the suckers, we feel sure.

The widely read entertainment trade paper Variety was far more upbeat in its review. After previewing the film in Hollywood on February 17, 1950–two and a half months prior to the feature's national release–the critic for Variety endorsed the film and drew special attention to the quality of Stanwyck's and Lund's performances and to the overall quality of the motion picture's production values:

"No Man of Her Own" combines an adult love story with melodrama, runs off with the intensity of a full-bloom soap opera, and is altogether satisfying screen dramatics...Barbara Stanwyck does a beautiful job of portraying the heroine...[and] John Lund wraps up his role as the man who falls in love with a girl he believes to be the widow of his dead brother. It's a fine job...Richard Maibaum's production does not miss on any phase of the story, whether drama or melodrama, and the lineup of behind-the-camera credits are in keeping. Donald L. Fapp's photography, the score by Hugo Friedhofer, editing, costumes, settings and art direction all figure importantly.

Lionel Collier of Picturegoer reviewed the film positively. "The pot-boiler is extremely well acted and its clever cast, headed by attractive and talented Barbara Stanwyck, enables it to confound the moralists and prove that two or more wrongs can make a right, while, at the same time, handing out moving and occasionally gripping screen fiction. See it by all means, but fight shy of the heroine's way of life". Eddie Muller called the film "the ultimate 'woman's noir.' Mitchell Leisen, a wizard at 'weepies,' directed the adaptation of Cornell Wollrich's I Married a Dead Man, fashioning a combination tearjerker and backstabber".

== Adaptations ==
The film is based on the novel I Married a Dead Man, which was also adapted for a variety of other screen productions, including the Japanese film Shisha to no Kekkon (1960), the Brazilian telenovela A Intrusa (1962), the Bollywood movie Kati Patang (1970), the Tamil film Panchavarna Kili (1965), the French film J'ai épousé une ombre (1983), and by Hollywood again for Mrs. Winterbourne (1996) starring Shirley MacLaine, Ricki Lake and Brendan Fraser.

== See also ==
- List of American films of 1950

=== Streaming audio ===
- No Man of Her Own on the Screen Directors Playhouse: September 21, 1951
