= Krazzy 4 =

- Theatrical release poster
- Directed by: Jaideep Sen
- Written by: Ashwni Dhir
- Story by: Rakesh Roshan
- Produced by: Rakesh Roshan
- Starring: Juhi Chawla; Arshad Warsi; Irrfan Khan; Rajpal Yadav; Suresh Menon; Dia Mirza; Rajat Kapoor; Mukesh Rishi
- Cinematography: Ajit Bhat
- Edited by: Meghna Ashchit
- Music by: Songs: Rajesh Roshan; Background Score: Raju Singh
- Production company: FilmKraft Productions
- Distributed by: Yash Raj Films (India); Eros International (International)
- Release date: 11 April 2008
- Running time: 112 minutes
- Country: India
- Language: Hindi
- Budget: ₹18 crore
- Box office: ₹32.27 crore

Krazzy 4 is a 2008 Indian Hindi-language comedy thriller film directed by Jaideep Sen and produced by Rakesh Roshan. Written by Ashwni Dhir on the basis of a story by Roshan, the film stars Juhi Chawla, Arshad Warsi, Irrfan Khan, Rajpal Yadav, and Suresh Menon in lead roles, while Shahrukh Khan and Hrithik Roshan appear in item numbers. The music of the film is by Rajesh Roshan. It is a loose remake of the 1989 American film The Dream Team and the 1991 Malayalam film Mookilla Rajyathu. The film was released on 11 April 2008 and was a moderate success at the box office.

== Plot ==
Raja, who has intermittent explosive disorder, Gangadhar, a schizophrenic man living in India’s freedom struggle era, Dr. Mukherjee, who has obsessive–compulsive personality disorder, and Dabboo, who has selective mutism, are patients under the care of Dr. Sonali at a mental hospital. She secures permission to take them to an Independence Day India–England cricket match.

On the way, Sonali stops at her clinic and is kidnapped by criminals, an act secretly witnessed by Dabboo. Unable to speak, he fails to alert the others. As the group searches for her, they get separated and face personal setbacks, including Raja’s emotional reunion with his former girlfriend Shikha and a violent confrontation with her fiancé.

The group eventually learns that Sonali’s husband, R. K. Sanyal, is involved in the kidnapping, meant to force Sonali into declaring a criminal named Rana insane. With Shikha’s reluctant help, they expose Sanyal’s role through a staged reward announcement and a hidden camera. Sonali is repeatedly moved by the conspirators but is finally traced to a hospital.

At the hospital, Sonali and other doctors expose the plot, punish Rana during his examination, and reveal Sanyal’s betrayal. The criminals are arrested, Sonali is rescued, and the four patients safely return home.

== Cast ==
- Juhi Chawla as Dr. Sonali R. Sanyal, a psychiatrist who knows what's wrong with her patients. She is a sensitive woman who firmly believes that "if you really want to make them well, you should treat them with your heart, not just your mind."
- Irrfan Khan as Dr. Mukherjee, a doctor who has obsessive–compulsive personality disorder. He is obsessed with cleanliness and wants everything prim and proper. Obsessed with being in control of a situation, he doesn't realize that he's lost his mind.
- Arshad Warsi as Raja, an angry young man whose blood boils and fists clench, and who is ready to beat the daylights out of anyone who upsets him in any way. He is diagnosed with intermittent explosive disorder.
- Rajpal Yadav as Gangadhar, suffering from Schizophrenia, he marches to a drum roll which only he can hear, and is fighting for a cause that is long over. He assumes an air of fighting for swaraj (freedom).
- Suresh Menon as Dabboo, cute and adorable, he's everyone's pet. Even if he can hear and understand, Dabboo refuses to speak. He has selective mutism
- Dia Mirza as Shikha Khanna, a TV reporter who controls the news on the channel called Aaj Tak, but is unable to control the rage of Raja, the man she loves.
- Rajat Kapoor as Ravi K. Sanyal, an industrialist and Dr. Sonali's husband who, in his quest for power and money, takes a step that has alarming repercussions for his wife and her four patients.
- Mukesh Rishi as Rana, Dr. Sonali's kidnapper later gets tortured in hospital by four crazy boys.
- Zakir Hussain as ACP Srivastav, a man neck-deep in illegal activities, who stoops to anything to keep himself ahead.
- Sanjay Mishra as Traffic Inspector Dayanand Dubey
- Sunil Pal as a taxi driver (cameo appearance)
- Vivek Shauq and Dolly Bindra as a couple on the sidewalk
- Shah Rukh Khan as dancer in the song "Break Free" (special appearance)
- Hrithik Roshan as dancer in the end credits (special appearance)
- Rakhi Sawant as a dancer in item number "Dekhta Hai Tu Kya" (special appearance)

== Production ==
Krazzy 4 marks the first production-only venture by Rakesh Roshan. In all his previous films, he not only produced but also directed them. Sunaina, Roshan's daughter, who recovered from cervical cancer, served as a co-producer on the film.

It also marks Irrfan Khan and Juhi Chawla acting in the same film after a period of four years. The last they were seen in a film was in 7½ Phere (2005). Chawla reprises her role of a psychiatrist after a gap of 10 years, when she did Deewana Mastana (1997).

The film features an item number by Shahrukh Khan and Hrithik Roshan, Rakesh's son. While Hrithik will introduce the protagonists via a promotional video, Shahrukh will be shown performing at a function, as a part of an important sequence in the film. About Shahrukh's gesture by performing the item number, Hrithik said "it's the first time something like this has been done, it highlights the solidarity of the industry. Shah Rukh has shown a lot of grace and respect for my father and we're touched as a family." While this marks the second item number for Hrithik after Dhoom 2 (2006), it will be Shahrukh's third after Kaal (2005) and Om Shanti Om (2007). Rakhi Sawant also lent her bit by performing another item number in the film.

Ashwni Dhir, who wrote for Office Office, a sitcom on Indian television, wrote the dialogues and screenplay for the film. Rajesh Roshan, Rakesh's brother has composed the music, while Javed Akhtar has penned the lyrics for the movie. In an interview, Rakesh said that their intention was the finish the shooting by December 2007. About why Hrithik was not a part of this film, he chose not to reveal the reasons. Dia Mirza said about her experience working in the film:

I'm part of Rakesh Roshan's Krazzy 4 though I'm one of the sane members of the cast. That's sad because I'd have happily played one of the nuts. It's been good fun because I got to work with artists I've always admired like Irrfan Khan, Arshad Warsi and Juhi Chawla. I adore Juhi, to be working with her is like a dream come true.

The trailers for the film were out on 25 January 2008. The film marks the only production venture of Rakesh Roshan to not feature his son Hrithik in the lead to date. Yadav and Menon have since starred with Roshan in Krrish 3 (2013) and Kaabil (2017) respectively.

== Music ==
Krazzy 4

Studio album by Rajesh Roshan
- Released: 28 February 2008 (Digital Release); 11 April 2008 (Film)
- Genre: Feature film soundtrack
- Label: T-Series
- Producer: Rajesh Roshan

Rajesh Roshan chronology
| Krrish (2006) | Krazzy 4 (2008) | Kites (2010) |

The music of the film is composed by Rajesh Roshan.

| Title | Artist | Lyricist | Pictured on |
|---|---|---|---|
| Break Free | Vishal Dadlani | Asif Ali Beg | Shah Rukh Khan |
| Dekhta hai Tu Kya | Sunidhi Chauhan & Keerthi Sagathia | Javed Akhtar | Rakhi Sawant, Makarand Deshpande & Irrfan Khan |
| Ik Rupaya | Bhavin Dhanak, Jimmy Moses, Keerthi Sagathia, Labh Janjua, Rahul Vaidya & Sudesh Bhonsle | Javed Akhtar | Ninad Kulkarni, Rajpal Yadav, Arshad Warsi, Irrfan Khan & Suresh Menon |
| Krazzy 4 | Vishal Dadlani | Asif Ali Beg | Hrithik Roshan |
| O Re Lakad | Kailash Kher, Neeraj Shridhar & Sowmya Raoh | Javed Akhtar | Juhi Chawla & Arshad Warsi, Irrfan Khan, Rajpal Yadav & Suresh Menon |

Music composer Ram Sampath alleged that the music for the theme songs "Break Free" and "Krazzy 4" was copied from a Sony Ericsson advertisement composed by him and featuring Hrithik Roshan, who also appears in the latter. He lodged a case against the producers of the film claiming damages of ₹ 20 million. On 10 April 2008, the Bombay High Court upheld his complaint and directed producer Rakesh Roshan to delete the songs from the film. Rakesh reached an out-of-court settlement with Sampath, and the film was released with the controversial songs on 11 April 2008.

== See also ==
- Asadhyulu, a 1992 Indian Telugu-language psychological film based on The Dream Team
