= Dil Hi To Hai =

Dil Hi To Hai (lit. 'It's Only a Heart') may refer to:

- Dil Hi To Hai (1963 film), 1963 Indian film
- Dil Hi To Hai (1992 film), 1992 Indian film
- Dil Hi Toh Hai, Indian television and web series
