= The Roshans =

2025 Indian documentary series

- Promotional poster
- Genre: Documentary; Biography
- Directed by: Shashi Ranjan
- Composers: Pranav Parab; Wilfred Soz
- Country of origin: India
- Original language: Hindi
- No. of episodes: 4

Production
- Producers: Shashi Ranjan; Rakesh Roshan
- Cinematography: Arvind K.
- Editor: Geeta Singh

Original release
- Network: Netflix
- Release: 17 January 2025

The Roshans is a 2025 Indian Hindi-language documentary series that premiered on Netflix on 17 January 2025. The four-part biographical series examines the life, work, and legacy of the Roshan family, a multigenerational household that has been part of the Hindi film industry for over seven decades.

The series traces the artistic lineage from composer Roshan Lal Nagrath to his sons Rakesh Roshan and Rajesh Roshan, and to actor Hrithik Roshan, reflecting on how the family’s creative output helped shape mainstream Bollywood music and cinema.

== Synopsis ==
The Roshans chronicles four generations of one of India's most recognizable film families. The narrative begins with Roshan Lal Nagrath, who rose to prominence as a composer in the 1950s and 1960s. It then explores the parallel careers of his sons—filmmaker Rakesh Roshan and composer Rajesh Roshan—before culminating in the global stardom of Hrithik Roshan.

The docu-series intertwines personal anecdotes with professional milestones, using extensive archival footage, rare home videos, and intimate family interviews. It presents the Roshan family as both public figures and private individuals grappling with fame, legacy, and loss. Themes of artistic pressure, reinvention, and intergenerational influence recur throughout the episodes, reflecting how the family navigated changes in the Indian film industry.

== Cast and interviewees ==
The series features appearances and interviews from members of the Roshan family and their close associates:

- Roshan Lal Nagrath (archival)
- Ira Nagrath (archival)
- Rakesh Roshan
- Pinkie Roshan
- Sunaina Roshan
- Suranika Soni
- Hrithik Roshan
- Hrehaan Roshan
- Hridhaan Roshan
- Rajesh Roshan
- Kanchan Roshan
- Eshaan Roshan
- Shah Rukh Khan
- Salman Khan
- Vicky Kaushal
- Sham Kaushal
- Jackie Shroff
- Tiger Shroff
- Ameesha Patel
- Javed Akhtar
- Honey Irani
- Zoya Akhtar
- Farhan Akhtar
- Farah Khan
- Preity Zinta
- Priyanka Chopra
- Asha Bhosle
- Sanjay Leela Bhansali
- Subhash Ghai
- Karan Johar
- Shatrughan Sinha
- Sonu Nigam
- Shailendra Singh
- Kishore Desai
- Madhuri Dixit
- Arjun Rampal
- Abhishek Bachchan
- Ranbir Kapoor
- Siddharth Anand
- Anil Kapoor
- Robin Bhatt
- Salim Merchant
- Anupam Kher
- Taran Adarsh

== Family background and legacy ==
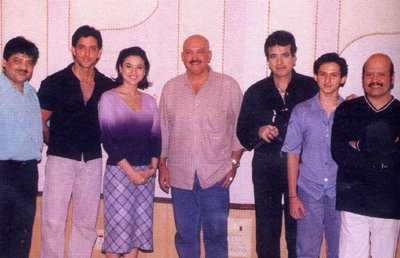
Hrithik Roshan (second from left), Rakesh Roshan (centre), Eshaan Roshan (second from right), and Rajesh Roshan (extreme right) in 2001

=== Roshan ===
The docu-series opens with the life and career of the family patriarch, composer Roshan (Lal Nagrath), tracing his move to Bombay via Gujranwala, Lucknow and Delhi, and his marriage to singer Ira Nagrath (later Ira Roshan). It recounts his first big opportunity from filmmaker Kidar Sharma in Neki Aur Badi (1949) and uses archival audio to illustrate his process and impact on Hindi film music of the 1950s–60s. Critics note that the show positions Roshan’s oeuvre—frequently referenced through celebrated songs and interviews with peers—as the creative springboard for subsequent generations.

=== Rakesh Roshan ===
Acting career

The second strand focuses on Rakesh Roshan’s early years in front of the camera, acknowledging a prolonged period of struggle and near-misses. Rakesh recalls being replaced by Jeetendra in Basu Chatterjee’s Priyatama (1977), an incident he says was driven by distributor scepticism and co-star preferences; the episode is explicitly cited in the series and subsequent coverage. He accepted character and negative roles in order to remain visible, before eventually re-orienting his career.

Transition to Director

The series then charts Rakesh’s pivot to filmmaking, marking commercial breakthroughs with Khudgarz (1987) and Karan Arjun (1995). It revisits turning points and crises—including the shooting incident shortly after Kaho Naa… Pyaar Hai (2000) and his later cancer diagnosis—through family testimonies and industry recollections. Shah Rukh Khan, among other collaborators, weighs in on Rakesh’s directorial method and his partnership with brother Rajesh, recalling how he advised launching Hrithik owing to his screen presence. Coverage around the show also noted Rakesh indicating that an announcement on Krrish 4 would come “very soon.”

=== Rajesh Roshan ===
The programme’s third track examines Rajesh Roshan’s apprenticeship with the composer duo Laxmikant–Pyarelal and his emergence as a music director with films like Kunwara Baap (1974) and Julie (1975). It comments on his longevity across changing musical tastes while retaining a relatively low public profile, with family and colleagues reflecting on his creative temperament and collaborations with Rakesh on multiple soundtracks.

=== Hrithik Roshan ===
The final arc centres on Hrithik Roshan’s career, beginning with the unprecedented debut of Kaho Naa… Pyaar Hai (2000) and the mass hysteria that followed, juxtaposed against personal doubts and physical setbacks he discusses on camera. Reviews highlight his candid reflections on “insurmountable odds,” as well as behind-the-scenes material from the Koi… Mil Gaya/Krrish era and accounts of the period around the attack on Rakesh Roshan. Prior to release, Hrithik said he initially felt “embarrassed” by the idea of a family documentary before recognising it as a story about legacy beyond himself.

== Production ==
The series was announced by Netflix in late 2024 as part of its slate of Indian original documentaries.

According to reports, the Roshan family provided filmmakers unprecedented access to personal archives, including photographs and home videos dating back several decades. Production sources suggested that the interviews were conducted over several months in 2024, with Hrithik Roshan initially expressing hesitation about sharing deeply personal experiences on camera before agreeing to participate.

The project was filmed primarily in Mumbai and includes footage from the family’s homes and film sets. It was edited to combine archival elements with contemporary reflections..

== Structure and episodes ==
The series is divided into four episodes, each exploring a different phase of the Roshan family's artistic and personal journey.

Episode	Synopsis	Original release date
1	The opening episode introduces the patriarch, Roshan Lal Nagrath, charting his evolution from a classically trained musician to a composer who bridged traditional Indian music with cinematic expression. It features rare interviews with industry contemporaries and analyses his impact on film music during the golden age of Bollywood.	17 January 2025
2	Focuses on Rakesh Roshan and Rajesh Roshan, tracing their early struggles, creative collaborations, and individual successes. The episode highlights Rakesh’s transition from actor to filmmaker and Rajesh’s rise as a composer, while addressing the challenges of sustaining a family legacy in a competitive industry.	17 January 2025
3	Chronicles Hrithik Roshan’s debut with Kaho Naa... Pyaar Hai (2000), the unprecedented fame that followed, and his personal and professional battles. The episode juxtaposes public adulation with introspective accounts of self-doubt, injury, and perseverance.	17 January 2025
4	The final episode brings the family’s story into the present, reflecting on generational continuity, Hrithik’s evolving career, and the artistic inclinations of his sons. It concludes with reflections on how the Roshan family perceives its place in the changing landscape of Indian cinema.	17 January 2025

== Release ==
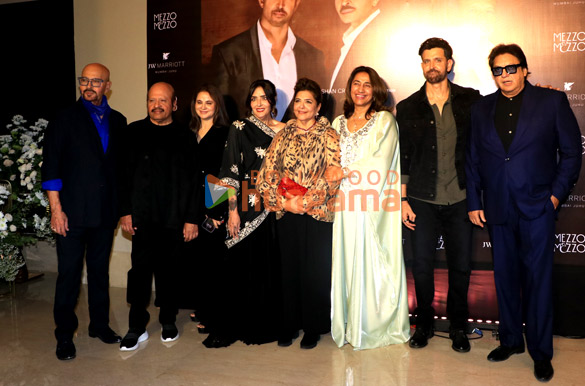
(from left to right) Rakesh Roshan, Rajesh Roshan, Kanchan Roshan, Sunaina Roshan, Pinkie Roshan, Anu Ranjan, Hrithik Roshan and Shashi Ranjan in 2025

The Roshans was released globally on 17 January 2025 on Netflix. All four episodes were made available for streaming simultaneously. Promotional materials, including the trailer and key art, were unveiled in early January 2025. Netflix promoted the series as an "emotional exploration of one of India's most beloved film families."

== Reception ==
=== Critical response ===
On the review aggregator website Rotten Tomatoes, 100% of 6 critics' reviews are positive. The website's consensus reads: "An introspective of the Roshan family through three generations and their contributions to Hindi-language cinema."

Writing for Medium, Sucharita Tyagi described The Roshans as “a masterclass in storytelling about a famous family,” commending its emotional core and sincerity. NDTV rated it three out of five stars, calling it “an easy, breezy watch with memorable moments,” particularly highlighting Hrithik Roshan’s openness about his personal challenges. Pinkvilla described the series as “absolutely raw, real, and heartwarming,” appreciating its portrayal of three generations of creative contributions. Similarly, The Indian Express labelled it a “valuable addition to films about the Hindi film industry,” recognizing its attention to legacy and artistry.

The Hindu characterized the documentary as “an expected trip down memory lane,” stating that while engaging, it offered “little new insight” into the family’s history. The Times of India echoed this view, calling it “engaging in parts” but ultimately a “glossy, polished tribute.” CNBC TV18 described it as “too myopic, afraid, and sanitised to divulge anything of importance or intrigue.” The Hollywood Reporter India commented that it was an example of “nonfiction behaving like fiction,” arguing that it prioritized image control over authentic exploration.

== See also ==
- The Romantics (TV series) (2023)
- Angry Young Men (miniseries) (2024)
