= Kishen Kanhaiya =

- Film Poster
- Directed by: Rakesh Roshan
- Written by: Ravi Kapoor; Mohan Kaul; Kader Khan
- Produced by: Rakesh Roshan
- Starring: Anil Kapoor; Shilpa Shirodkar; Madhuri Dixit
- Cinematography: Pushpal Dutta
- Edited by: Sanjay Verma
- Music by: Rajesh Roshan
- Distributed by: Film Kraft
- Release date: 9 March 1990
- Running time: 160 minutes
- Country: India
- Language: Hindi

Kishen Kanhaiya is an Indian Hindi action comedy film directed by Rakesh Roshan, released in 1990. The film stars Anil Kapoor (in dual roles), Shilpa Shirodkar and Madhuri Dixit. It was commercially successful and became the fourth highest-grossing Bollywood film of that year.

== Plot ==
Leela and Bholaram are a childless couple. Leela is a midwife to a wealthy couple (Sunder Das), and helps Sunder's wife with the labour and delivery. His wife gives birth to twin boys, there are complications for the mother however, and she passes away without seeing her children. Leela, realizing the father won't be able to care for both kids, decides to keep one baby for herself. While Bholaram is anxious about getting found out and dealing with Sunder's consequences for taking his kid, he eventually gives in to his wife. They present Sunder with good and bad news, that his wife has given birth to a child, but he is now also a widower.

Sunder attempts to bring up Kishen in comfort, but is unable to be a proper parent due to grief. He decides to marry Kamini, who is supposed to help him raise Kishan, but she also has a brother- Gendamal. He comes along with her child named Mahesh, born out of wedlock, to live with her in her new home. When Sunder learns of this, he becomes angry that it was not disclosed to him prior to the marriage and suffers a heart attack from the stress. While he is having the attack, Gendamal seizes the opportunity and makes him have an "accident due to the heart attack" resulting in Sunder becoming paralyzed and somewhat mute. Kishen is brought up by Kamini and Gendamal with a lot of abuse and intimidation, while Sunder can only look on hopelessly. Despite making Kishan traumatized and timid, he remains kind and full of love. He is kept uneducated so that he can blindly do what they want and get what they need from him to stay in the power position.

Leela and Bholaram raise Kanhaiya, in a different part of the region, with a meager lifestyle. Kanhaiya is brought up to be a street-smart, tough, clever, movie loving young man. He soon meets an girl, Anju, who is equally in love with movies as well as rich, and pampered. The one thing that ties the brothers together is their twin connection. If one is injured, hurt or sick, the other can feel the pain, too. Only Bholaram makes this connection at a vital point in the story.

Kishen's only friends are Radha, a maid, and her little sister. Kishan & Radha fall in love and manage to get married, but the atrocities from his step-mother and her family do not stop. Finally, Gendamal asks Mahesh to kill Kishen by throwing him off a cliff after getting the property signed over to his name. After the deed is carried out and they believe Kishan is dead, Kanhaiya learns the truth from his parents and returns with Bholaram to the ancestral mansion, shocking everyone. What also shocks everyone is his changed attitude. He stands up for himself and leaves everyone in a tailspin. Radha realizes Kanhaiya is not her husband and laments for her Kishan.

Meanwhile Kishan survives the attempt on his life, but the injury has left him with amnesia. Anju sees him wandering the streets and mistakes him for Kanhaiya. She tries to help him get his memory back, but gets heartbroken when she realizes he may never remember her again.

Things finally come together for everyone after Radha visits a temple, the same one Anju and Kishan are at, to pray for her husband and ends up finding him there. Kishen and Kanhaiya finally meet and come together to fight the evil, get back their family and live the life that was stolen from them.

== Cast ==
- Anil Kapoor as(dual role)
  - Kishen Das; Sundar Das's elder son; Kanhaiya's twin brother; Radha's husband
  - Kanhaiya Das; Sundar Das's younger son; Kishen's twin brother; Anju's husband
- Shilpa Shirodkar as Radha; Kishen's wife; Sundar Das's daughter-in-law
- Madhuri Dixit as Anju; Kanhaiya's wife; Sundar Das's daughter-in-law
- Kader Khan as Munshi
- Saeed Jaffrey as Vidyacharan
- Ranjeet as Shridhar
- Bindu as Kamini
- Dalip Tahil as Mahesh
- Amrish Puri as Gendamal
- Sujit Kumar as Bholaram
- Shubha Khote as Leela
- Shreeram Lagoo as Sundar Das; Kishen and Kanhaiya's father
- Johnny Lever as Lobo
- Dinesh Hingoo as Lokhandwala
- Vikas Anand as Doctor Mohan Kapoor

== Production ==
Madhuri Dixit notably parodied Madhubala in this film.

== Soundtrack ==
Kishen Kanhaiya

Studio album by Rajesh Roshan
- Released: 1990 (India)
- Genre: Feature film soundtrack
- Label: Venus Records and Tapes
- Producer: Rajesh Roshan

Rajesh Roshan chronology
Bahar Aane Tak (1990)	Kishen Kanhaiya (1990)	Jurm (1990)

The soundtrack contains six songs. The music is composed by Rajesh Roshan, with lyrics written by Indeevar and Anwar Sagar. The album includes songs sung by top singers like Lata Mangeshkar, Asha Bhosle, Sadhana Sargam, Mohammed Aziz, Amit Kumar, Manhar Udhas and Nitin Mukesh.Three songs from the album were on Binaca Geetmala year-end list of 1990."Aap Ko Dekhke"(#4)"Suit Boot Mein Aaya Kanhaiya"(#24) and "Krishna Krishna,Aaye Krishna"(#26).

Song	Singer
"Krishna Krishna, Aaye Krishna"	Lata Mangeshkar, Nitin Mukesh
"Kuch Ho Gaya,Kya Ho Gaya"	Asha Bhosle, Mohammed Aziz
"Suit Boot Mein Aaya Kanhaiya"	Amit Kumar
"Aap Ko Dekh ke"	Amit Kumar, Sadhana Sargam
"Radha Bina Hai Kishan Akela"	Manhar Udhas, Sadhana Sargam
"Mere Humsafar"	Sadhana Sargam
