= Aankh Micholi (1972 film) =

1972 film directed by Ramanna

- Directed by: Ramanna
- Starring: Rakesh Roshan; Bharathi
- Music by: Shankar-Jaikishan
- Release date: 30 June 1972
- Country: India
- Language: Hindi

Aankh Micholi is a 1972 Bollywood drama film directed by Ramanna. It stars Rakesh Roshan, Bharathi in lead roles. It was a remake of the Tamil blockbuster, Ooty Varai Uravu (1967).

== Cast ==
- Rakesh Roshan as Ravi
- Bharathi as Geeta
- Farida Jalal as Geeta
- Om Prakash as Ramlal
- Purnima as Mrs. Ramlal
- Sharad Kumar as Sundar
- Meena T. as Suman
- Jagdeep as Dr. Mangal

== Soundtrack ==
Song	Singer
"Aaja Re Aaja, Chhup Chhupke Pyar Karenge"	Kishore Kumar, Asha Bhosle
"Tere Mere Pyar Ki Jo Baat Chali"	Kishore Kumar, Lata Mangeshkar
"Kehta Hai Dil Mastana"	Kishore Kumar
"Deewani Chandni"	Asha Bhosle
"Dil Ki Muraden Poori"	Asha Bhosle
