= J. Om Prakash =

Indian film producer and director (1926–2019)

Jay Om Prakash
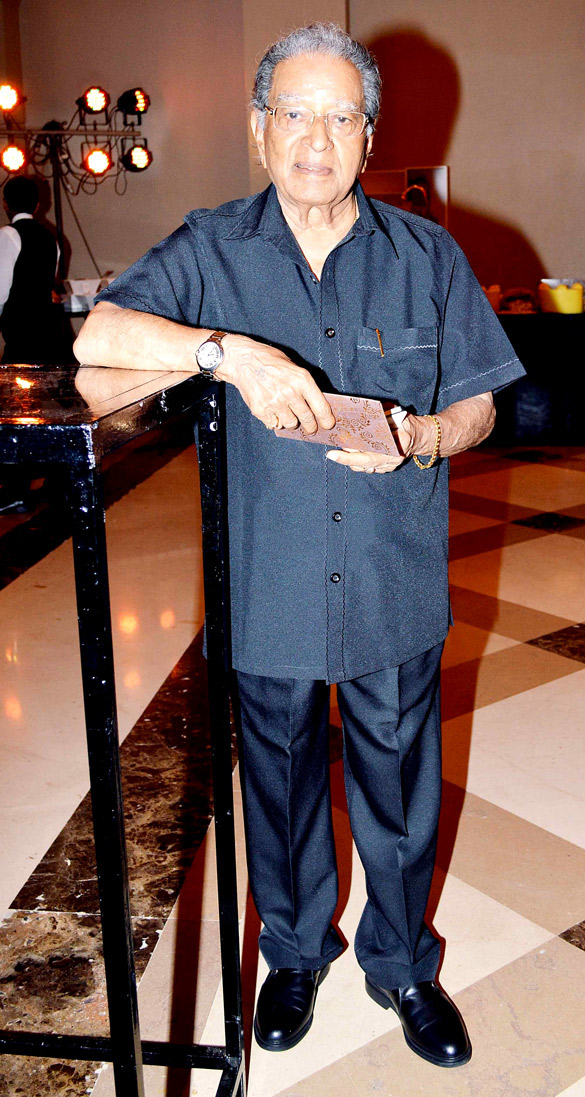
- Jay Om Prakash
- Born: 24 January 1926
- Died: 7 August 2019 (aged 93); Mumbai, Maharashtra, India
- Occupation: Filmmaker
- Years active: 1961 – 2001
- Spouse: Padma Om Prakash
- Children: Pinkie Roshan
- Relatives: See Roshan family

Jay Om Prakash (24 January 1926 – 7 August 2019) was an Indian Bollywood film producer and director. He directed films like Aap Ki Kasam (1974), Aakraman, Aashiq Hoon Baharon Ka, Aakhir Kyon? (1985) with Rajesh Khanna as the lead hero and his other successful directorial ventures include some of Jeetendra's most critically acclaimed works, such as Apnapan (1977), Aasha (1980), Apna Bana Lo (1982), Arpan (1983), and Aadmi Khilona Hai (1993) with Jeetendra as the lead. He was presenter for the films Raja Rani and Aan Milo Sajna, both having Rajesh Khanna as lead.

His films were romantic musical dramas, noted for their strong emotional appeal. They often explored complex relationships, with characters grappling with jealousy, betrayal, doubt, and the consequences of their actions. His narratives addressed themes such as fidelity and extramarital affairs directly, depicting the hardships and lessons learned through life's trials.

His daughter, Pinkie, is married to director-producer Rakesh Roshan, making him the maternal grandfather of actor Hrithik Roshan.

== Early life ==
Om was born in 1926. His father worked as a school teacher in Lahore. He used to play the harmonium in the stage plays of his school and college. According to Om, Qateel Shifai and Faiz Ahmed Faiz were his friends. Om would read their books in Urdu and attend their mushairas. He started loving Urdu in those days which improved his sense of lyrics and music. Later in his career he often gave suggestions to his music directors.

Om worked as a clerk in a film distributor's office in Lahore and later became a manager. After the Partition of India, he moved to Mumbai.

== Career ==
His film production Company was named as Filmyug meaning 'The Age Of Films'. Aas Ka Panchhi, released in 1960, was a Silver Jubilee hit and the company continued to produce films till the middle of 1990s. He was known in the film industry as Om ji. He produced box office hit films like Ayee Milan Ki Bela (1964), Aaye Din Bahar Ke (1966), Aya Sawan Jhoom Ke (1969), Aankhon Aankhon Mein and Aakhir Kyun.

He made his directorial debut with hit film Aap Ki Kasam starring Rajesh Khanna and Mumtaz. The film was a box office success, and is remembered for the performance by its lead actors and all of its songs like "Jai, Jai Shiv Shankar", "Karwaten Badalte Rahen", "Pass Nahi Aana", "Zindagi Ke Safar".

Most of his films' titles start with the letter "A" or "Aa". According to Om, his first movie Aas Ka Panchhi started with Aa, after this he started "Aa" as a brand name for his naming his movies. There were only two exceptions to it, namely Bhagwan Dada directed and Raja Rani produced by him.

He directed successful Punjabi language film Aasra Pyaar Da (1983) and produced critically acclaimed but box office flop Aandhi (1975). Afsana Dilwalon Ka (2001) with actor Rahul Roy was his last film as a director.

He served as the President of the Indian Motion Picture Producers' Association (IMPPA) and the Film Producers’ Guild for six years. He was elected President of the Film Federation of India and served for the year 1995–1996. He participated in the Directorate of Film Festivals and Central Board of Film Certification. He had also been a lecturer at the Pune Film Institute.

He was presented the Lifetime Achievement Award in 2004 by the Asian Guild Of London.

He died in Mumbai on 7 August 2019, at the age of 93.

== Filmography ==
Year	Film	Director	Producer	Notes
1961	Aas Ka Panchhi		Yes	
1964	Ayee Milan Ki Bela		Yes	
1966	Aaye Din Bahar Ke		Yes	
1969	Aya Sawan Jhoom Ke		Yes	
1972	Aankhon Aankhon Mein		Yes	
1974	Aap Ki Kasam	Yes	Yes	
1975	Aakraman	Yes		
1975	Aandhi		Yes	
1977	Apnapan	Yes	Yes	
1977	Aashiq Hoon Baharon Ka	Yes		
1980	Aasha	Yes	Yes	
1981	Aas Paas	Yes		
1982	Apna Bana Lo	Yes		
1983	Aasra Pyaar Da	Yes		Punjabi Movie
1983	Arpan	Yes	Yes	
1985	Aakhir Kyon?	Yes	Yes	
1986	Aap Ke Saath	Yes	Yes	
1986	Bhagwan Dada	Yes		
1988	Agnee	Yes	Yes	
1991	Aadmi Aur Apsara	Yes		
1992	Ajeeb Dastaan Hai Yeh	Yes	Yes	
1993	Aadmi Khilona Hai	Yes		
2001	Afsana Dilwalon Ka	Yes	Yes	
