= Ek Aur Sikander =

- Promotional Poster
- Directed by: Bhaskar Shetty
- Written by: Bhaskar Shetty
- Produced by: V.R.Parameshwaram
- Starring: Mithun Chakraborty; Rati Agnihotri; Anita Raj; Rakesh Roshan; Amrish Puri
- Music by: Rajesh Roshan
- Release date: 1 November 1986 (India)
- Running time: 140 minutes
- Language: Hindi

Ek Aur Sikander (Literal translation is One More Alexander, while this expression can be taken as saying Another Hero / Greatman) is a 1986 Indian Hindi-language family drama film directed by Bhaskar Shetty, starring Mithun Chakraborty, Rati Agnihotri, Anita Raj, Amrish Puri and Rakesh Roshan.

== Songs ==
All song lyrics were penned by Majrooh.

1	"Aaja Saathiya"	Kishore Kumar, Lata Mangeshkar
2	"Hai Maa Khuda To Nahi"	Kishore Kumar, Manna Dey, Alka Yagnik
3	"Dhadka Dil Dil Dil"	Kishore Kumar, Alka Yagnik
4	"Mere Ladle"	Lata Mangeshkar
5	"Aao Aao Luka Chhupi Khele"	Mohammed Aziz, Alka Yagnik

== Cast ==
- Mithun Chakraborty as Sikandar
- Rati Agnihotri as Dr Anita
- Anita Raj as Shama Khan, daughter of Dilawar Khan
- Rakesh Roshan as Police Inspector Amar Verma
- Amrish Puri as Sher Khan /Dilawar Khan (Dual Role)
- Geeta Siddharth as Zareena, mother of Amar
- Shreeram Lagoo as Police Inspector /Police Commissioner Shashikant Verma, father of Sikander
- Tanuja as Tanu Verma
- Mohan Sherry as Sunil, Anita's father
- Viju Khote as Boga Seth Jewellery Owner/Trader
- Jeevan as Micheal
- Sujit Kumar as Vikas, gang member of Micheal (Guest Role)
- Vikas Anand as Mohan, gang member of Micheal (Guest Role)
- Mukri as Chacha
- Shivraj as Anita's patient
