= Kayam (1982 film) =

- Directed by: P. K. Joseph
- Written by: Balagopal
- Screenplay by: Balagopal
- Starring: Jagathy Sreekumar; Cochin Haneefa; Shankar; Vijayan
- Cinematography: Ramakrishnan
- Edited by: K. Sankunni
- Music by: M. K. Arjunan
- Production company: Bhavana Arts
- Distributed by: Bhavana Arts
- Release date: 28 May 1982
- Country: India
- Language: Malayalam

Kayam is a 1982 Indian Malayalam film, directed by P. K. Joseph. The film stars Jagathy Sreekumar, Cochin Haneefa, Shankar and Vijayan in the lead roles. The film has musical score by M. K. Arjunan.

== Cast ==
- Jagathy Sreekumar
- Cochin Haneefa
- Shankar
- Vijayan
- Anjali Naidu
- Rathidevi

== Soundtrack ==
The music was composed by M. K. Arjunan and the lyrics were written by Poovachal Khader.

No.	Song	Singers	Lyrics	Length (m:ss)
1	"Jeevithame Nin Neelakkayangal"	K. J. Yesudas	Poovachal Khader	
2	"Kaayalkkarayil Thanichu"	S. Janaki	Poovachal Khader	
