= Rakesh Roshan =

Indian filmmaker (born 1949)

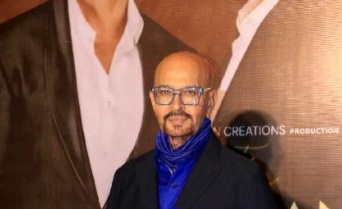
- Roshan in 2025
- Born: Rakesh Roshan Nagrath; 6 September 1949 (age 77); Bombay, Bombay Province, India
- Other name: Guddu
- Occupations: Film producer; film director; screenwriter; actor
- Years active: 1970–present
- Organisation: Filmkraft Productions
- Spouse: Pinkie Roshan (m. 1970)
- Children: 2, including Hrithik Roshan
- Parents: Roshan (father); Ira Roshan (mother)
- Relatives: Roshan family

Rakesh Roshan Nagrath (born 6 September 1949) is an Indian film producer, director, screenwriter and actor who works in Hindi films. He appeared in 84 films in the 1970s and 1980s. As an actor, he is mostly known for his supporting roles in big-budget films. Later, his prominence increased and he achieved fame for directing films with titles beginning with the letter "K" since 1987.

As a filmmaker, his work includes the action drama Khudgarz (1987), the revenge drama thriller Khoon Bhari Maang (1988), the action comedy Kishen Kanhaiya (1990), the melodramatic thriller Karan Arjun (1995), the musical romantic thriller Kaho Naa... Pyaar Hai (2000), the science fiction film Koi... Mil Gaya (2003) and its sequels, the superhero Krrish film series (2006–13). He has won the Filmfare Award for Best Film and Best Director for Kaho Naa... Pyaar Hai and Koi... Mil Gaya.

In 2025, Netflix released a four-part documentary series titled The Roshans. The series traces the artistic lineage from composer Roshan Lal Nagrath to his sons Rakesh Roshan and Rajesh Roshan, and to actor Hrithik Roshan, reflecting on how the family's creative output helped shape mainstream Bollywood music and cinema.

== Early life ==
Rakesh was born on 6 September 1949 to Indian Punjabi music director, Roshan Lal Nagrath and Bengali singer, Ira Moitra. His younger brother is Rajesh Roshan.

== Career ==
=== 1970–1986 ===
After his father's untimely death, Rakesh started his career as an assistant director to filmmaker Mohan Kumar in films like Anjaana starring Rajendra Kumar and Babita. Rajendra Kumar referred him to some filmmakers and thus he was signed by Soodesh Kumar for Man Mandir starring Sanjeev Kumar and Waheeda Rehman. As an actor, he made his debut in the 1970 film Ghar Ghar Ki Kahani, in which he got a supporting role.

Rakesh got very few solo hero films in his career. He got such roles in more women-oriented films, such as Paraya Dhan with Hema Malini, Aankh Micholi with Bharathi, Khubsoorat with Rekha and Kaamchor with Jaya Prada. His few successful solo hero films, with the focus equally on both hero and heroine, were Aankhon Aankhon Mein with Rakhee, Nafrat with Yogita Bali, Ek Kunwari Ek Kunwara with Leena Chandavarkar, Hamari Bahu Alka with Bindiya Goswami and Shubh Kaamna with Rati Agnihotri. J. Om Prakash produced Aankhon Aankhon Mein with Rakesh in the lead. Later, J. Om Prakash directed Aakraman, with Sanjeev Kumar in the lead, and had Rakesh in a supporting role, and then produced Aakhir Kyon?, with Rajesh Khanna in the lead and Rakesh in a supporting role.

Rakesh played supporting roles in a few successful films such as Man Mandir with Sanjeev Kumar in the lead, Khel Khel Mein with Rishi Kapoor in the lead, Bullet with Dev Anand as the hero, Hatyara with Vinod Khanna in the lead, Dhongee with Randhir Kapoor, Khandaan with Jeetendra and Neeyat with Shashi Kapoor as the lead hero. He played supporting roles regularly in films with Rajesh Khanna in the lead role and of those, Chalta Purza was a failure and the other three were blockbusters - Dhanwan, Awaaz and Aakhir Kyon?. The few multi-star cast films he was part of as the lead hero that were successful between 1977 and 1986 were Devata, Shriman Shrimati and Haathkadi, all of which had Sanjeev Kumar as the main lead hero and Jaag Utha Insan and Ek Aur Sikander, which had Mithun Chakraborty in the main lead, and other hits such as Dil Aur Deewaar, Khatta Meetha, Unees-Bees (1980) and Maqaar (1986). Most of his other films as a second lead hero or solo hero films between 1973 and 1990 were box office flops.

Rakesh set up his own production company, Filmkraft, in 1980 and their first production was Aap Ke Deewane (1980), which was a box office flop. His next venture was Kaamchor, also produced by him, which became a hit, but the success of this film was attributed to its music and the heroine Jaya Prada. His next solo hero film Shubh Kaamna, directed by K. Vishwanath, was a hit. He tried to re-launch himself as a lead hero with Bhagwaan Dada (1986), directed by J. Om Prakash and starring Rajinikanth as the main lead and himself in the second lead. But the film was a flop. Between 1984 and 1990 he only got supporting roles, with the exception of Bahurani. The multi-star films where he was the second lead, such as Maqaar and Ek Aur Sikander were successful. His last film as a leading hero was Bahurani, which was a woman-oriented film starring Rekha in the lead, which was directed by Manik Chatterjee and released in 1989.

=== 1987–1999 ===
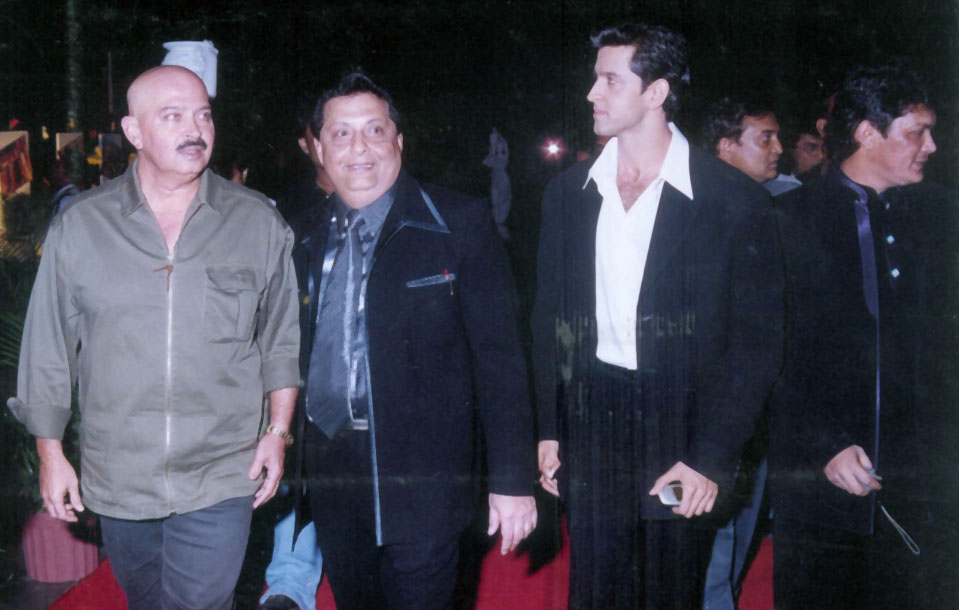
Roshan (left) with his son Hrithik Roshan (right) and Thakur Doultani (middle)

Rakesh made his directorial debut with the action drama Khudgarz (1987), starring Jeetendra, Shatrughan Sinha, Govinda, Bhanupriya, Amrita Singh and Neelam Kothari. The film emerged as a huge commercial success at the box-office.

He next directed the revenge drama thriller Khoon Bhari Maang (1988), starring Rekha alongside Kabir Bedi and Sonu Walia. The film received highly positive reviews upon release, and became a major commercial success at the box-office. It was also noted as a path-breaking film, emerging as one of the first successful films with the heroine as the central protagonist. The film also earned Rekha her second Filmfare Award for Best Actress, in addition to Roshan's first nominations for Best Film and Best Director. He followed it up with the action comedy Kishen Kanhaiya (1990), starring Anil Kapoor in dual roles, alongside Madhuri Dixit and Shilpa Shirodkar.

His next directorial venture was the romantic comedy Khel in 1992 starring an ensemble cast of Anil Kapoor, Madhuri Dixit, Anupam Kher, Mala Sinha and Sonu Walia in lead roles and action comedy King Uncle in 1993 starring an ensemble cast of Jackie Shroff, Anu Aggarwal, Shah Rukh Khan, Nagma and Paresh Rawal in lead roles. Both Khel and King Uncle were commercially successful and have since gained cult status, being well received by families and children. King Uncle was one of few early successful films in which Shah Rukh Khan played a supporting role or second lead. It is also first film of Rakesh Roshan with Shah Rukh Khan.

His next directorial venture was the melodramatic thriller Karan Arjun (1995), starring Raakhee Gulzar, Salman Khan, Shah Rukh Khan, Kajol, Mamta Kulkarni and Amrish Puri in lead roles. The film received positive reviews from critics, and emerged as a blockbuster at the box-office, ranking as the second-highest-grossing Indian film of the year. It also earned Roshan his second nominations for the Filmfare Award for Best Film and Best Director.

He next directed the action thriller Koyla (1997), starring Shah Rukh and Dixit. The film received mixed reviews from critics, and emerged as an average grosser at the box-office, ranking as the ninth highest-grossing Indian film of the year.

=== 2000–present ===
==== 2000 murder attempt ====
On 21 January 2000, Roshan was shot at by two Budesh gang members near his office on Tilak Road at Santacruz, Mumbai. The assailants fired two bullets at him, one of which hit him on the left arm, while the other grazed his chest. As the director fell to the ground, the assailants fled the scene. The culprits were later identified as Sunil Vithal Gaikwad and Sachin Kamble. The attack on Rakesh was not undertaken with the intent to kill, but to signal that the Shiv Sena could no longer protect its clients. Rakesh had stonewalled demands from Budesh for a percentage of the profits from the overseas earnings of his hit film Kaho Naa... Pyaar Hai.

==== Hrithik's career ====
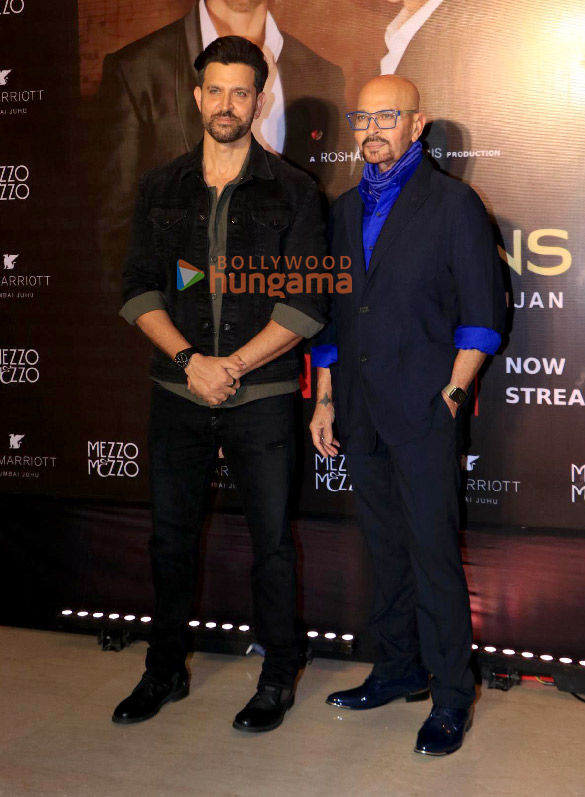
Roshan (right) with his son Hrithik Roshan (left) in 2025

He launched his son Hrithik's career as a lead actor with the musical romantic thriller Kaho Naa... Pyaar Hai (2000), alongside debutante Ameesha Patel. Rakesh later revealed that this film was inspired by Shakti Samanta's Aradhana (1969), starring Sharmila Tagore and Rajesh Khanna. The film received positive reviews from critics upon release, and emerged as the second highest-grossing Indian film of the year. It won Rakesh his first Filmfare Award for Best Film and Best Director, in addition to entering the Limca Book of Records for the most awards won by a Bollywood film.

He directed his son again, alongside Rekha and Preity Zinta, in the 2003 science-fiction film Koi... Mil Gaya. The first installment of the Krrish franchise, the film opened to positive reviews, with particular praise for its novel concept, and emerged as the second highest-grossing Indian film of the year. It earned Rakesh his second consecutive Filmfare Award for Best Film and Best Director.

He directed his son for the third time in its sequel, the science-fiction superhero film Krrish (2006), alongside Priyanka Chopra, Rekha and Naseeruddin Shah. The film received positive reviews upon release, and emerged as a trend-setter, bringing in Hindi cinema's first superhero. It emerged as a major commercial success at the box-office, ranking as the second highest-grossing Indian film of the year. Krrish earned Rakesh his fifth nominations for the Filmfare Award for Best Film and Best Director.

In 2008, he produced the comedy thriller Krazzy 4 which marked his first production-only venture. Directed by Jaideep Sen and starring Juhi Chawla, Arshad Warsi, Irrfan Khan, Rajpal Yadav and Suresh Menon, the film received negative reviews and emerged as a commercial failure at the box-office.

In 2010, he produced the Bollywood-meets-Hollywood crossover film titled Kites, directed by Anurag Basu and starring Hrithik alongside Mexican actress Bárbara Mori. Despite hype prior to release, the film received mixed-to-negative reviews upon release, and emerged as a commercial failure at the box-office. Another version of this film was released internationally and known as Brett Ratner presents Kites: The Remix. This version was shorter, and mainly toned down the amount of musical numbers.

His next directorial was Krrish 3 (2013), the third film of the Krrish franchise. With Hrithik and Chopra reprising their roles from the previous film, it also stars Vivek Oberoi and Kangana Ranaut. The film received mixed-to-positive reviews from critics upon release, and emerged as a major commercial success at the box-office, ranking as the third highest-grossing Indian film of the year.

In 2017, he produced the romantic action thriller Kaabil, starring Hrithik alongside Yami Gautam. The film opened to mixed reviews from critics upon release, and emerged as an average grosser at the box-office.

He is next set to direct Krrish 4, with Hrithik and Priyanka Chopra reprising their roles. However, the film has been delayed due to the COVID-19 pandemic.

== Personal life ==
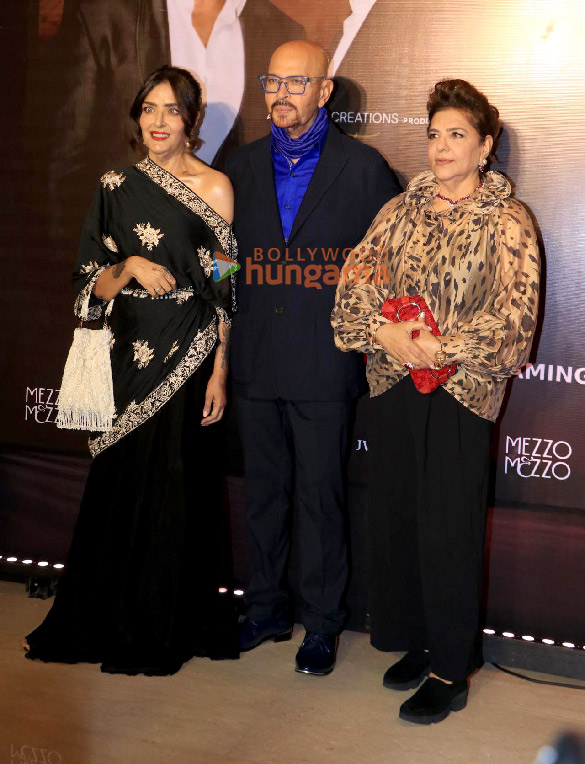
Roshan with his wife Pinkie (right) and daughter Sunaina (left)

Rakesh is married to Pinkie Roshan, daughter of J. Om Prakash. They have two children, Sunaina Roshan and Hrithik Roshan.

In January 2019, Rakesh was diagnosed with early-stage squamous cell carcinoma of the throat.

== Honours ==
- Rakesh was honoured on 3 December 2006 during the International Film Festival of India (IFFI) in Panaji for his contribution to mainstream cinema.
- On 11 December 2006, Rakesh was honoured during the Global Indian Film Awards (GIFA) for his outstanding contribution to Indian cinema over the past 35 years.

== Filmography ==
=== As an actor ===
Year	Film	Role	Notes			
Year	Film	Role	Notes	1970	Ghar Ghar Ki Kahani	Suresh
1971	Man Mandir	Ramu				
1971	Paraya Dhan	Shankar				
1971	Seema					
1972	Aankhon Aankhon Mein	Rakesh Rai				
1972	Aankh Micholi	Ravi				
1972	Buniyaad	Ajit Kumar				
1973	Ek Kunwari Ek Kunwara	Harish Bhatia				
1973	Nafrat	Prakash				
1974	Goonj	Rakesh Kumar				
1974	Pugli	Raja				
1974	Trimurti	Nandu				
1974	Madhosh	Goldie				
1975	Khel Khel Mein	Vikram "Vicky"				
1975	Aakraman	Lieutenant Sunil Mehra				
1975	Zakhmee	Amar				
1976	Bullet	Inspector Rajesh				
1976	Ginny Aur Johnny					
1976	Raeeszada					
1977	Anand Ashram	Dr. Prakash				
1977	Chalta Purza	Inspector Sunil Verma				
1977	Priyatama	Rakesh				
1977	Hatyara	Inspector Prakash				
1977	Haiwan					
1978	Aahuti	Bharat Prasad				
1978	Dil Aur Deewaar	Chandu				
1978	Khatta Meetha	Firoz Sethna				
1978	Devata	George				
1979	Ganga Aur Geeta	Friendly Appearance				
1979	Jhoota Kahin Ka	Vijay Rai / Vikram				
1979	Dhongee	Inspector Thapa				
1979	Khandaan	Rakesh				
1979	Prem Jaal	Mahendra				
1979	Ikraar					
1979	Aangan Ki Kali	Anmol				
1980	Aap Ke Deewane	Rahim				
1980	Unees Bees	Dev				
1980	Neeyat	Ajay				
1980	Pyaara Dushman	Raja				
1980	Khubsoorat	Indra Gupta				
1981	Bhula Na Dena	Arun				
1981	Naari					
1981	Daasi	Anup				
1981	Dhanwan	Anil				
1981	Hotel	Vijay				
1981	Haqdaar	Rakesh				
1981	Jeene Ki Arzoo	Ravi				
1982	Haathkadi	Baldev Mittal				
1982	Vakil Baboo	Prem Oberoi				
1982	Teesri Ankh	Anand				
1982	Hamari Bahu Alka	Pratapchand				
1982	Jeevan Dhaara	Kamal Pal Singh				
1982	Shriman Shrimati	Rajesh Kumar				
1982	Kaamchor	Suraj				
1982	Waqt Waqt Ki Baat	Inspector Shankar				
1982	Baawri	Shyam Bhardwaj				
1982	Begunaah Qaidi					
1983	Shubh Kaamna	Ratan				
1983	Jeet Hamaari	Anand				
1984	Main Qatil Hoon					
1984	Hanste Khelte	Rakesh				
1984	Awaaz	Inspector Vijay Gupta				
1984	Zindagi Jeene Ke Liye	Ashok				
1984	Jaag Utha Insan	Brahmanand Chaturvedi "Nandu"				
1985	Pyaase Honth					
1985	Bahu Ki Awaaz	Vimal Srivastav				
1985	Mahaguru	Subhash				
1985	Aakhir Kyon?	Kabir Suri				
1985	Zulm Ka Badla	Inspector Anil Verma				
1985	Patthar Dil	Chandar				
1985	Kaala Sooraj	Inspector Pratap Singh				
1985	Haveli	Kumar Saxena				
1986	Maqaar					
1986	Khamosh Nigahen					
1986	Bhagwaan Dada	Swaroop				
1986	Ek Aur Sikander	Inspector Amar Verma				
1986	Anubhav	Amit Kumar				
1987	Mera Yaar Mera Dushman	Ashok				
1987	Daku Hasina	S.P. Ranjeet Saxena				
1988	Ramkudi Jhamkudi					
1988	Be Lagaam					
1988	Paigham	Naasir Khaan				
1988	Khoon Bhari Maang	Vikram Saxena	Guest appearance			
1989	Bahurani	Amit Chaudhary				
1990	Shararat		Guest appearance			
1995	Pyar Do Pyar Lo	Himself				
1995	Akele Hum Akele Tum	Paresh Kapoor				
1996	Aurat Aurat Aurat	Rakesh "Guddu"				
1999	Mother	Amar Khanna				
2003	Koi... Mil Gaya	Sanjay Mehra				
2006	Krrish	Sanjay Mehra				
2007	Om Shanti Om	Himself	Guest appearance			
2013	Krrish 3	Sanjay Mehra				

=== Other crew positions ===
Year	Film	Credited as			Notes
Year	Film	Director	Producer	Writer	Notes
1980	Aap Ke Deewane		check		
1982	Kaamchor		check		
1984	Jaag Utha Insan		check		
1986	Bhagwaan Dada		check		
1987	Khudgarz	check	check		
1988	Khoon Bhari Maang	check	check		
1989	Kala Bazaar	check			
1990	Kishen Kanhaiya	check	check		
1992	Khel	check			
1993	King Uncle	check	check		
1995	Karan Arjun	check	check		
1997	Koyla	check	check		
1997	Kaun Sachcha Kaun Jhootha		check		
2000	Kaho Naa... Pyaar Hai	check	check	Story	
2000	Karobaar	check			
2003	Koi... Mil Gaya	check	check	check	
2006	Krrish	check	check	check	
2008	Krazzy 4		check	Story	
2010	Kites		check		
2013	Krrish 3	check	check	check	
2017	Kaabil		check		

Television

- The Roshans (2025)

== Frequent collaborations ==
As a director, Rakesh is known for making films with his son Hrithik Roshan and having music directed by his younger brother Rajesh Roshan. Other actors he has frequently collaborated with include Rekha, Madhuri Dixit, Anil Kapoor, Shah Rukh Khan, and Amrish Puri. All of the films he has directed, have their titles start with the letter 'K'.

== Awards ==
Year	Film	Award	Category
2004	Koi Mil Gaya	National Film Awards	Best Film on Social Issues
2001	Kaho Naa Pyaar Hai	Filmfare Awards	Best Film
2001	Kaho Naa Pyaar Hai	Filmfare Awards	Best Director
2004	Koi Mil Gaya	Filmfare Awards	Best Film
2004	Koi Mil Gaya	Filmfare Awards	Best Director
2001	Kaho Naa Pyaar Hai	IIFA Awards	Best Film
2001	Kaho Naa Pyaar Hai	IIFA Awards	Best Director
2004	Koi Mil Gaya	IIFA Awards	Best Director
2007	Krrish	IIFA Awards	Creative Person of the Year
2009	Kaho Naa Pyaar Hai, Koi Mil Gaya	IIFA Awards	Golden Decade Honour for Best Director
2001	Kaho Naa Pyaar Hai	Zee Cine Awards	Best Film
2001	Kaho Naa Pyaar Hai	Zee Cine Awards	Best Director
2004	Koi Mil Gaya	Zee Cine Awards	Best Film
2004	Koi Mil Gaya	Zee Cine Awards	Best Director
2004	Koi Mil Gaya	Apsara Awards	Best Film
2004	Koi Mil Gaya	Apsara Awards	Best Director
2015	-	Apsara Awards	Lifetime Achievement Award
2001	Kaho Naa Pyaar Hai	Bollywood Movie Awards	Best Film
2001	Kaho Naa Pyaar Hai	Bollywood Movie Awards	Best Director
