= Madhumati (dancer) =

Indian dancer and actress (1938–2025)

- Born: 30 May 1938; Maharashtra, India
- Died: 15 October 2025 (aged 87)
- Occupations: Dancer, actress
- Known for: Tower House, Shikari, Mujhe Jeene Do

Madhumati (30 May 1938 – 15 October 2025) was an Indian dancer and actress who worked in many films, including Hindi and regional cinema across Marathi, Punjabi, Bhojpuri, Gujarati, and South Indian languages. She is best known for her performances in films such as Tower House, Shikari, Mujhe Jeene Do, and Ankhen.

== Life and career ==
Born on 30 May 1938 in Maharashtra, she was trained in traditional forms of dance, including Manipuri, Kathakali, Kathak, and Bharatanatyam. She began her film career in 1957 with a Marathi film which was unreleased.

At the age of 19, she married Bhangra founder and dancer Manohar Deepak.

Madhumati died on 15 October 2025, at the age of 87.

== Selected filmography ==
=== Film ===
Year	Film	Role
1960	Zameen Ke Tare	Singer/dancer
1964	Dulha Dulhan	Chanda's friend
1967	Anita	Red-Headed Nightclub Performer
1968	Ankhen	Madhu
1968	Saraswatichandra	Padma
1969	Talash	Rupali
1969	Shatranj	Dancer
1970	Jawab	Dancer
1970	Ishq Par Zor Nahin	Dancer
1971	Chhoti Bahu	Dancer
1971	Chahat	Stage dancer
1972	Aankhon Aankhon Mein	Dancer
1972	Roop Tera Mastana	Dancer
1972	Sazaa	Banto Jatti
1972	Jai Jwala	Champa
1972	Annadata	Champavathi
1975	Jogidas Khuman	
1976	Charas	Laila
1977	Amar Akbar Anthony	Bijli
1977	Chaani	
1984	The Gold Medal	Chameli
