= Aankhon Aankhon Mein =

1972 film directed by Raghunath Jhalani

- Directed by: Raghunath Jhalani
- Written by: Story and Screenplay: Sachin Bhowmick; Dialogues: Ahsan Rizvi
- Produced by: J. Om Prakash
- Starring: Rakesh Roshan; Raakhee; Pran
- Cinematography: V. Babasaheb
- Edited by: Pratap Dave
- Music by: Shankar-Jaikishan
- Distributed by: Filmyug Pvt. Ltd.
- Release date: 9 June 1972
- Country: India
- Language: Hindi

Aankhon Aankhon Mein is a 1972 Hindi movie produced by J. Om Prakash and directed by Raghunath Jhalani. The film stars Rakesh Roshan, Raakhee, Pran in leas roles, with Dara Singh in a very special appearance. The film is written by Sachin Bhowmick with dialogues by Ahsan Rizvi. The film's music is by Shankar-Jaikishan. Raakhee earned a Filmfare nomination as Best Actress, the only nomination for the film.

== Cast ==
- Rakesh Roshan as Rakesh Rai
- Raakhee as Parvati
- Pran as Thakur Shiv Prasad
- Tarun Bose as Kulwant Rai
- Achala Sachdev as Shobha Rai
- Pankaj as Naresh Rai
- Krishan Dhawan as Mama Ramakant
- Brahm Bhardwaj as Suresh Bakshi, Rakesh's employer in Himachal Pradesh
- Raj Mehra as Ram Prasad
- Shivraj as Sundarlal
- Dara Singh as Pahelwan
- Tun Tun as Mrs. Pereira
- Jayshree T. as Dancer Garima
- Madhumati as Dancer Bhagyashree

== Soundtrack ==
The soundtrack of the film was composed by Shankar-Jaikishan with the lyrics penned by Hasrat Jaipuri and Verma Malik.

Song	Singer
"Gaya Bachpan Jo Aayi"	Lata Mangeshkar
"Teri Umar Nadaan Hai"	Kishore Kumar
"Aankhon Aankhon Mein Baat Hone Do"	Kishore Kumar, Asha Bhosle
"Do Baaten Pyar Bhari Kar Loon, Kar Lo Ji"	Kishore Kumar, Asha Bhosle
"Tera Mera Mel Hai"	Kishore Kumar, Asha Bhosle
"Gora Rang Mera, Gori Baahen Gol Gol"	Usha Mangeshkar, Asha Bhosle
