= Shriman Shrimati =

- Directed by: Vijay Reddy
- Written by: Raj Baldev Raj
- Produced by: B. Nagi Reddy
- Starring: Sanjeev Kumar; Raakhee
- Music by: Rajesh Roshan
- Release date: 5 March 1982
- Country: India
- Language: Hindi

Shriman Shrimati is a 1982 Indian Hindi film produced by B. Nagi Reddy and directed by Vijay Reddy. The film stars Sanjeev Kumar, Raakhee, A. K. Hangal, Amol Palekar, Deepti Naval, Rakesh Roshan, Sarika, Lalita Pawar and Anjali Naidu. Rajesh Roshan is the music director of the film. It was remake of Tayaramma Bangarayya, a 1979 film starring Sowcar Janaki and Kaikala Satyanarayana. The remake rights of this film are now owned by Glamour Eyes Films.

== Cast ==
- Sanjeev Kumar as Shriman Shankar Lal
- Raakhee as Shrimanti Parvati Devi
- A. K. Hangal as Vishwanath Gupta
- Amol Palekar as Madhu Gupta
- Deepti Naval as Veena
- Rakesh Roshan as Rajesh Kumar
- Sarika as Aruna Gupta
- Lalita Pawar as Mrs Kumar
- Dinesh Hingoo as Pyarelal's friend
- Dheeraj Kumar as Pyarelal
- Leela Mishra
- Anjali Naidu
- Dr.Shriram Lagoo as Surajmal
- Ramana Murthy
- Sri Lakshmi

== Soundtrack ==
#	Title	Singer(s)
1	"Ek Nasihat Meri Yaaro"	Kishore Kumar, Lata Mangeshkar
2	"Main Tera Husband"	Kishore Kumar, Lata Mangeshkar
3	"Ori Hawa Dheere Se Chal"	Kishore Kumar
4	"Sabke Aage Humko Nachaya"	Kishore Kumar, Lata Mangehskar
5	"Ori Hawa Dheere Se Chal (Sad)"	Kishore Kumar
