= Rajesh Roshan =

Indian music director and composer (born 1955)

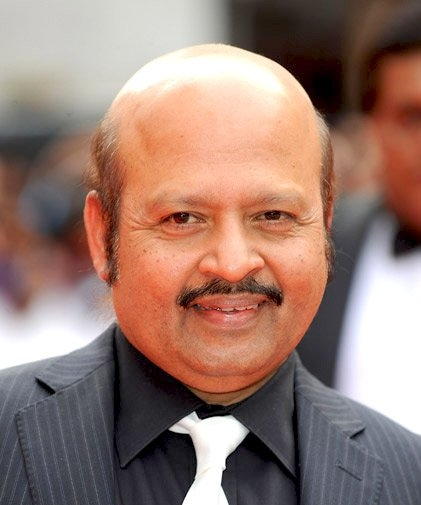
- Rajesh Roshan in 2010
- Born: Rajesh Roshanlal Nagrath; 24 May 1955 (age 71); Bombay, Bombay State, India (present-day Maharashtra, India)
- Occupations: Music director; composer
- Years active: 1974–2017
- Spouse: Kanchan Roshan
- Children: 2, including Pashmina Roshan
- Parents: Roshan; Ira Roshan
- Relatives: Roshan family

Rajesh Roshanlal Nagrath (born 24 May 1955), known professionally as Rajesh Roshan, is an Indian music director and composer.

== Personal life ==
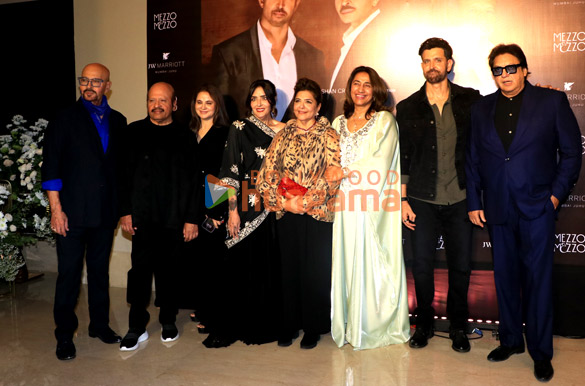
(from left to right) Rakesh Roshan, Rajesh Roshan, Kanchan Roshan, Sunaina Roshan, Pinkie Roshan, Anu Ranjan, Hrithik Roshan and Shashi Ranjan at The Roshans success party

Rajesh was born to music director Roshanlal Nagrath and singer Ira Nagrath on 24 May 1955 in Bombay, Bombay Presidency. His father is Punjabi and his mother is Bengali. He is younger brother to actor, director and producer Rakesh Roshan, thus making him uncle to latter's children, Sunaina Roshan and actor Hrithik Roshan. He is married to Kanchan with whom he has two children – a son, Eshaan Roshan, married to actor and model Aishwarya Singh in 2025 and a daughter, Pashmina Roshan, also an actress.

== Career ==
Rajesh Roshan had a frequent successful collaboration with Kishore Kumar, Basu Chatterjee, Dev Anand, Mohammed Rafi, Amit Kumar, Lata Mangeshkar, Asha Bhosle. He shot to fame with the score for the 1974 film Kunwara Baap and the 1975 film Julie; for the latter he won the Filmfare Best Music Director Award.

Rajesh scored for Kunwara Baap (1974) and then in three back-to-back hit films: Des Pardes, Man Pasand, Lootmaar. He went on to compose melodious tunes and made Kishore Kumar sing them in films like Mama Bhanja, Doosra Aadmi, Swami, Priyatama, Yehi Hai Zindagi, Ek Hi Raasta, Swarag Narak, Inkaar, Khatta Meetha, Baton Baton Mein, Do Aur Do Paanch, Kaamchor, Hamari Bahu Alka, Jaag Utha Insan, Bhagwaan Dada, Ghar Sansar followed by films with Rajesh Khanna like Janta Hawaldar, Nishaan, Babu and Aakhir Kyon?.

In the 1990s, he worked in albums like Karan Arjun (1995), Sabse Bada Khiladi (1995), Papa Kehte Hai (1996), Koyla (1997), Keemat – They Are Back, Daag: The Fire (1999), Dastak (1996), Kya Kehna (2000) and Kaho Naa... Pyaar Hai (2000).

Critics believe that several of his most popular songs are closely based on popular songs from other countries.

Rajesh has been the recipient of several prestigious awards for his contributions to Hindi cinema music. He has won multiple Filmfare Awards and other accolades for Best Music Director for films like Kaho Naa... Pyaar Hai and Koi... Mil Gaya.

In 2025, Netflix released a four-part documentary series titled The Roshans. The series traces the artistic lineage from composer Roshan to his sons Rakesh and Rajesh, and to actor Hrithik, reflecting on how the family’s creative output helped shape mainstream Bollywood music and cinema.

== Plagiarism claims ==
Rajesh Roshan has often been accused of plagiarism; veteran journalist Karan Thapar talks of at least 39 copied tunes. Indian music critic Karthik Srinivasan, on his website ItwoFS, which tracks plagiarism in the Indian film music industry, lists 41 such tunes. These include some of Roshan's best-known titles, such as "Jab Koi Baat Bigad Jaye" (Jurm, 1990) being inspired by "Hear The Whistle Blow A Hundred Miles" from Lester Flatt and Earl Scruggs (released in 1967) and "Aye Dil Laya Hai Bahaar" (Kya Kehna, 2000) inspired by Neil Sedaka's 1959 single "Oh! Carol".

In 2008, the Bombay High Court obligated the Roshan brothers to pay up to ₹2 crore to music composer Ram Sampath following his accusations of their film Krazzy 4, produced by Rakesh and having Rajesh as music director, containing Sampath's plagiarised music score.

== Filmography ==
=== As Music Director ===
Year	Film	Notes	Sales
2017	Kaabil		
2013	Krrish 3		
2010	Kites		
2008	Krazzy 4		
2006	Krrish		1,300,000
2004	Aetbaar		
2003	Koi... Mil Gaya	Nominated, Filmfare Award for Best Music Director	2,100,000
2003	Love at Times Square	Title Track Only	
2002	Na Tum Jaano Na Hum		900,000
2002	Aap Mujhe Achche Lagne Lage		
2002	Koi Mere Dil Se Poochhe		
2001	Moksha		
2001	Mujhe Meri Biwi Se Bachaao		
2000	Karobaar		
2000	Kya Kehna		2,000,000
2000	Kaho Naa... Pyaar Hai	Winner, Filmfare Award for Best Music Director	10,000,000
2000	Mela	2 songs composed	
1999	Trishakti		
1999	Laawaris		
1999	Daag: The Fire		2,200,000
1998	Kudrat		
1998	Khote Sikkey		
1998	Mere Do Anmol Ratan		
1998	Main Solah Baras Ki		
1998	Jaane Jigar		
1998	Dand Nayak		
1998	Keemat		
1998	Yugpurush		
1998	Hafta Vasuli		
1997	Ghulam-E-Mustafa		
1997	Tarazu		
1997	Koyla		1,800,000
1997	Kaun Sachcha Kaun Jhootha		
1996	Dastak		
1996	Papa Kehte Hai	Nominated, Filmfare Award for Best Music Director	3,000,000
1996	Chhota Sa Ghar		
1995	Sabse Bada Khiladi		
1995	Karan Arjun	Nominated, Filmfare Award for Best Music Director	3,000,000
1994	Insaniyat		
1993	Aasoo Bane Angaarey		
1993	Gunaah		
1993	Zakhmo Ka Hisaab		
1993	Prateeksha		
1993	King Uncle		
1992	Yeh Raat Phir Na Aayegi		
1992	Khel		
1992	Lambu Dada		
1992	Kasak		
1991	Jeevan Daata		
1991	Do Pal		
1991	Swarg Yahan Narak Yahan		
1991	Shiv Ram		
1991	Karz Chukana Hai		
1991	Vishnu-Devaa		
1991	Begunaah		
1990	Bahaar Aane Tak		
1990	Jurm		
1990	Kishen Kanhaiya		1,200,000
1989	Kala Bazaar		
1989	Daddy		
1989	Asmaan Se Ooncha		
1989	Jaisi Karni Waisi Bharnii		
1988	Dharamyudh		
1988	Khoon Bhari Maang	Nominated, Filmfare Award for Best Music Director	
1988	Dariya Dil		
1988	Jungle Ki Beti		
1988	Maar Dhaad		
1988	Kabzaa		
1987	Kaash		
1987	Khudgarz		
1987	Dil Tujhko Diya		
1986	Anubhav		
1986	Ghar Sansar		
1986	Ek Aur Sikander		
1986	Bhagwaan Dada		
1986	Maqaar		
1985	Babu		
1985	Aakhir Kyon?		
1985	Ek Daku Shaher Mein		
1985	Ulta Seedha		
1985	Telephone		
1984	Inteha		
1984	Jaag Utha Insan		
1984	Yadoon Ki Zanjeer		
1984	Zindagi Jeene Ke Liye		
1983	Nishaan		
1983	Rishta Kagaz Ka		
1982	Kaamchor		
1982	Johny I Love You		
1982	Khud-daar		
1982	Waqt Waqt Ki Baat		
1982	Shriman Shrimati		
1982	Hamari Bahu Alka		
1981	Yaarana		
1981	Sannata		
1981	Shakka		
1980	Lootmaar		
1980	Man Pasand		
1980	Unees-Bees		
1980	Swayamvar		
1980	Aap Ke Deewane		
1980	Do Aur Do Paanch		
1980	Aakhri Insaaf		
1979	Kaala Patthar	Nominated, Filmfare Award for Best Music Director	
1979	Duniya Meri Jeb Mein		
1979	Mr. Natwarlal	Nominated, Filmfare Award for Best Music Director	
1979	Janta Hawaldar		
1979	Baton Baton Mein		
1978	Swarag Narak		
1978	Muqaddar		
1978	Des Pardes	Nominated, Filmfare Award for Best Music Director	
1978	Vishwanath		
1978	Tumhari Kasam		
1978	Dillagi		
1978	Ek Baap Chhe Bete		
1977	Jay Vejay		
1977	Doosara Aadmi		
1977	Mama Bhanja		
1977	Charandas		
1977	Ek Hi Raasta		
1977	Khatta Meetha		
1977	Inkaar		
1977	Yehi Hai Zindagi		
1977	Zindagi		
1977	Priyatama		
1977	Swami	Nominated, Filmfare Award for Best Music Director	
1976	Udhar Ka Sindur		
1976	Ginny Aur Johnny		
1975	Julie	Winner, Filmfare Award for Best Music Director	
1974	Kunwara Baap		
		Total sales	27,500,000

=== Television ===
- The Roshans (2025)
