= Man Mandir =

- Directed by: Tapi Chanakya
- Starring: Sanjeev Kumar, Waheeda Rehman
- Cinematography: Jal Mistry
- Music by: Laxmikant Pyarelal
- Release date: 1971
- Country: India
- Language: Hindi

Man Mandir is a 1971 Bollywood drama film directed by Tapi Chanakya. The film stars Sanjeev Kumar and Waheeda Rehman. This was the first film signed and shot by Rakesh Roshan, although 'Ghar Ghar Ki Kahani' signed after this film was released before 'Man Mandir'. The music is by Laxmikant Pyarelal.

Plot:

Orphaned at a very young age, Deepak and his sister, Laxmi, live a poor lifestyle. Deepak is introduced to Krishna and they soon marry and live together with Krishna's brother, Ramu. Deepak drives a taxi and it is through his earnings that they all live on. Soon Krishna gets pregnant, much to the delight of the entire household. Ramu has fallen into bad company and steals Krishna's necklace to throw a party for his friends. A kind-hearted wealthy Jeweler, Shyam Lal, returns the necklace to Deepak, as Deepak had returned his suitcase full of cash. Shyam would like his doctor son, Shankar, to marry Laxmi. A delighted Deepak arranges a meeting at the Lals residence. It is at this meeting that Deepak's life will be turned upside down, for this is where he will find that Laxmi is pregnant; shock and tragedy will follow when shortly thereafter Ramu will be run down by a car; his wife will give birth to a baby boy and pass away, and Laxmi will drown herself in a river. Looks like fate has turned its back on Deepak as he may be destined to bring up the child on his own.

== Cast ==
- Sanjeev Kumar as Deepak
- Waheeda Rehman as Krishna / Radha
- Rakesh Roshan as Ramu
- Sudesh Kumar as Shankar Lal (as Soodesh Kumar)
- David Abraham as Mr. Shyam Lal (as David)
- Mehmood as Gorakh Nath
- Aruna Irani as Shyamlee Singh
- Manorama as Mrs. Shyam Lal
- MacMohan as Pinto
- Sunder as Balu Singh
- Randhir as Shyam Lal's manager
- Onkar Ahmad
- Jagdish Raj as Kishan (as Jagdishraj)
- Indumati
- Kumudini Shanker
- Helen
- Ravikant as Sardar
- Mansaram
- Kanchan as Laxmi

== Soundtrack ==
No.	Title	Singer(s)	Length
1.	"A Aaja Aaja Abhi Nahin"	Kishore Kumar, Asha Bhosle	3:50
2.	"Ai meri aankhon ke pahale sapne (I)"	Lata Mangeshkar, Mukesh	4:02
3.	"Ai Meri aankhon ke pahale sapne (II)"	Mukesh, Lata Mangeshakar	4:10
4.	"Jaadugar tere naina"	Kishore Kumar, Lata Mangeshkar	5:45
5.	"Kahiye ji kya loge"	Asha Bhosle	5:25
6.	"Munna jayega bajar"	Suman Kalyanpur
