= Kaamchor =

- Directed by: K. Vishwanath
- Written by: Jainendra Jain
- Screenplay by: K. Viswanath
- Story by: K. Viswanath
- Produced by: Rakesh Roshan
- Starring: Rakesh Roshan; Jaya Prada; Suresh Oberoi; Shriram Lagoo
- Music by: Rajesh Roshan
- Distributed by: Film Kraft
- Release date: 24 December 1982
- Country: India
- Language: Hindi

Kaamchor (transl.: Idler) is a 1982 Indian Hindi-language drama film written and directed by K. Viswanath. Produced by Rakesh Roshan, the film is a Hindi remake of Viswanath's Telugu film Subhodayam (1980). The film stars Rakesh Roshan, Jaya Prada, Tanuja, Sujit Kumar, Suresh Oberoi, Shreeram Lagoo and Bhagwan Dada. The film's music is by the producer and lead actor's brother - Rajesh Roshan. The film became a superhit, along with the songs. Rakesh Roshan's nephew in the film is played by a young Sonu Nigam, who later became a playback singer.

== Premise ==
The movie follows Suraj, a carefree and unemployed young man who dreams of living a comfortable life without working. Suraj has been an aimless and lazy slacker all his adult life, who has no goals for his future. He lives in Delhi with his brother, sister-in-law, and nephew. On one occasion, he gate-crashes one of his brother's supervisor's friend's wedding ceremony and finds out that the groom is to live with his in-laws. To Suraj's delight, he finds out that the bride has an unmarried sister Geeta. So he pursues her to marry him.Suraj’s unwillingness to work and his growing greed lead to conflicts with his wife and her family. He marries Geeta, the daughter of a wealthy family, hoping that marriage will provide him with financial security. However, Geeta wants to build an independent life with him and encourages him to become responsible and hardworking. The film explores themes of laziness, responsibility, family values, and personal transformation.

== Cast ==
- Rakesh Roshan as Suraj
- Jaya Prada as Geeta Sanghvi
- Suresh Oberoi as Suresh
- Neeta Mehta as Roopa Sanghvi
- Sujit Kumar as Sohan
- Tanuja as Radha
- Shriram Lagoo as Rai Bahadur Chunilal Sanghvi
- Pinchoo Kapoor
- Asrani
- Bhagwan Dada
- Sonu Nigam (credited as Master Sonu)

== Music ==
Rajesh Roshan composed the music for this film. Song lyrics were penned by Indeevar.

S.No.	Song	Singer(s)
1	"Tujh Sang Prit Lagaai Sajanaa"	Kishore Kumar & Lata Mangeshkar
2	"Tum Mere Swami Main Tumhari Daasi"	Kishore Kumar & Lata Mangeshkar
3	"Mal De Gulaal Mohe Aai Holi Aai Re"	Kishore Kumar & Lata Mangeshkar
4	"Jogi O Jogi Bhag Mein Mere Likha Hai"	Kishore Kumar
5	"Tum Se Badhkar Duniya Mein" (solo)	Chandru Atma
6	"Tum se Badhkar Duniya mein" (duet)	Kishore Kumar & Alka Yagnik
