= Jaag Utha Insan (1984 film) =

- Poster
- Directed by: K. Viswanath
- Produced by: Rakesh Roshan
- Starring: Mithun Chakraborty; Sridevi; Rakesh Roshan; Deven Verma; J V Somayajulu; Sujit Kumar
- Cinematography: P. L. Raj
- Music by: Rajesh Roshan
- Production company: Filmkraft Productions
- Release date: 6 July 1984
- Running time: 135 minutes
- Country: India
- Language: Hindi
- Budget: Rs 10 lakhs

Jaag Utha Insan (transl. Awakened Man) is a 1984 Indian Hindi-language film directed by K. Viswanath, starring Mithun Chakraborty, Sridevi, Rakesh Roshan, Deven Verma, J V Somayajulu Sujit Kumar and music composed by Rajesh Roshan. It is the Hindi version of Viswanath's 1981 Telugu film Saptapadi. It is a love story between a Dalit boy and a Brahmin Girl, played by Mithun Chakraborty and Sridevi respectively in the lead roles, supported by Rakesh Roshan, J V Somayajulu Deven Verma, Sujit Kumar. The cinematographer P.L. Raj won the Filmfare Award for best cinematography. Film expert Rajesh Subramanian reveals that Jaya Prada was the first choice but since her dates were committed and clashed with Prakash Mehra's Sharaabi, Sridevi was signed to play the female lead.

== Plot ==
In the film, Sandhya – a Brahmin dancer falls in love with Hari, a Dalit. She visits her maternal grandfather – who is a staunch Hindu pundit – accompanied by her father and Hari, to perform at the village temple, where her grandfather is the head-priest. There, the grandfather decides to get Sandhya married to his adopted grandson Nandu, who is also a priest at the temple, but with a broader mind. Hari, citing the apparent caste difference, urges Sandhya to marry Nandu.

Hence Sandhya marries Nandu. However, on their wedding night, when Nandu enters the bedroom, he sees a Devi (Goddess) in Sandhya, and not his wife. This continues for a few nights, and people start talking about Nandu spending his nights outside the house. Before long, Sandhya confronts Nandu at the temple and asks him to try and accept her. Here Nandu tells her that he sees a Devi in her, and not his wife, because she belongs to someone else and not him. They are bound into this marriage by the Pundit's chants, mantras, and the seven pheras, but Sandhya has taken the eighth phera, which is the phera of the heart and mind, with someone else, and thus she belongs to that person alone, and must go back to him, whoever that may be.

Nandu explains this to the rest of the family, and the grandfather accepts Sandhya's love for Hari, in spite of Hari being a Harijan. This comes as a result of Nandu explaining the truth, that every person is a human being first, and a Shudra at birth. It is only because of his/her deeds that a person becomes a Brahmin. The common misinterpretation of the Hindu caste system is that, a person acquires his caste at birth, which is not so, as explained above.

Hari soon gets this news, and quickly arrives at the village. Even though the head priest of the village, Nandu's grandfather accepts Sandhya and Hari's relationship, his son and the rest of the village opposes it, and a fight breaks out. In the end both, Hari and Sandhya lose their lives.

Deven Verma, who plays the head priest's blood-related grandson, provides for the counter view throughout the film, and is the only one besides Nandu, who understands the real meaning of the Vedas, and supports him towards the end.

== Cast ==
- Mithun Chakraborty as Harimohan "Hari"
- Sridevi as Sandhya
- Rakesh Roshan as Brahmanand Chaturvedi "Nandu"
- Deven Verma as Devendra Chaturvedi "Deva"
- Sujit Kumar as Ram Narayan Chaturvedi
- J. V. Somayajulu as Sandhya's Grandfather

== Songs ==
Song	Singer
"Teri Zindagi Ke Ragini Par Mera Naam Likh De"	Kishore Kumar, Asha Bhosle
"Aayi Parvaton Pe Jhoomti Ghata"	Kishore Kumar, Asha Bhosle
"Morni Ne Seekha"	Asha Bhosle
"Tarpat Beete"	Lata Mangeshkar
"Jai Mata Di"	Mahendra Kapoor
