= Aap Ke Deewane =

1979 film

- Theatrical release poster
- Directed by: Surendera Mohan
- Written by: Madan Joshi (dialogues)
- Screenplay by: Mirza Brothers
- Story by: Mirza Brothers
- Produced by: Vimal Kumar; Rakesh Roshan (presents)
- Starring: Rishi Kapoor; Rakesh Roshan; Tina Munim; Jeetendra (Guest)
- Cinematography: P.L.Rai
- Edited by: Nand Kumar
- Music by: Film Music (Songs): Rajesh Roshan; Score: Sapan-Jagmohan
- Production company: Film Krafts
- Release date: 11 April 1980
- Running time: 140 minutes
- Country: India
- Language: Hindi

Aap Ke Deewane (transl. Crazy for You) is a 1980 Indian Hindi-language romance film, produced by Vimal Kumar under the Film Krafts banner, presented by Rakesh Roshan and directed by Surendera Mohan. It stars Rishi Kapoor, Rakesh Roshan and Tina Munim, while Jeetendra has given a guest appearance and the music was composed by Rajesh Roshan.

The film is Rakesh Roshan's first attempt at production, going forward he produced and directed films. Rishi Kapoor and Jeetendra being off-screen friends of his, he had a song put in to ensure that the three get together on screen too, as Jeetendra did not have a role in the film and is present only in the song.

Rakesh Roshan's son Hrithik Roshan, who was six years old at the time of filming the movie, appears briefly in Aap Ke Deewane as the child-version of the character otherwise played by his father, sharing his tricycle with another child on a beach.

== Plot ==
Ram (Rishi Kapoor) and Rahim (Rakesh Roshan) are inseparable childhood friends. They get enrolled in a college for further education and excel in studies. A fellow collegian Kundan (Ranjeet) has them framed for sexually molesting a girl. They are both expelled from college. They assume the identity of a couple and are employed as tutors to Sameera (Tina Munim), the adopted daughter of multi-millionaires Inshallah Khan (Ashok Kumar) and Colonel Thakur Vikramjit Singh (Pran). Both fall in love with Sameera and it is up to Sameera to choose her prospective life partner.

== Cast ==
- Rishi Kapoor as Ram
- Rakesh Roshan as Rahim
- Tina Munim as Sameera
- Jeetendra as Rocky (Guest Appearance)
- Hrithik Roshan (uncredited) as young Rahim
- Shoma Anand as Meena
- Ashok Kumar as Inshallah Khan
- Pran as Thakur Vikramjeet Singh
- Ranjeet as Kundan
- Deven Verma as Butler Arun
- Keshto Mukherjee as Lawyer Gangu
- Pinchoo Kapoor as Judge Bhargav
- Sudhir Dalvi Principal Raja Pratap
- Gulshan Bawra Adv Makhan Singh
- Yusuf Khan as Rivoli

== Soundtrack ==
Mohammed Rafi sang all the songs along with Kishore Kumar, Lata Mangeshkar and Amit Kumar. Mohammed Rafi provides playback for three male characters - Rishi Kapoor, Rakesh Roshan and Jeetendra - in three different songs. Lyrics are by Anand Bakshi.

Song	Singer
"Tera Jalwa"	Kishore Kumar, Mohammed Rafi
"Tumko Khush Dekhkar"	Kishore Kumar, Mohammed Rafi
"Aap Ke Deewane Hain"	Kishore Kumar, Amit Kumar, Mohammed Rafi
"Mere Dil Mein Jo"	Kishore Kumar, Lata Mangeshkar, Mohammed Rafi
"Ram Kare, Allah Kare" (Happy)	Amit Kumar, Lata Mangeshkar, Mohammed Rafi
"Ram Kare, Allah Kare" (Sad)	Amit Kumar, Mohammed Rafi
