= Roshan (music director) =

Indian musician (1917–1967)

Roshan Lal Nagrath
- Roshan in 1964
- Born: Roshan Lal Nagrath; 14 July 1917; Gujranwala, Punjab Province, British India
- Died: 16 November 1967 (aged 50); Bombay, Maharashtra, India
- Education: Marris College
- Spouse: Ira Roshan
- Children: Rakesh Roshan (son); Rajesh Roshan (son); Hrithik Roshan (grandson)
- Relatives: Roshan family
- Musical career
- Occupations: Music director; composer
- Instruments: Esraj; harmonium
- Years active: 1948–1967

Roshan Lal Nagrath (14 July 1917 – 16 November 1967), known mononymously as Roshan, was an Indian esraj player and music director.

Roshan's compositions were marked by a melodic sensibility, subtle yet expressive orchestration, and a depth of feeling that distinguished him from many of his contemporaries, having mastered Hindustani classical music, particularly in the ghazal and qawwali traditions. In the qawwali genre specifically, with titles such as "Na Toh Karvan Ki Talash Hai" (Barsat Ki Raat, 1960), he was particularly influential, and is said to be the only populariser of this genre of religious music between its founder Amir Khusro in the 13th century and Nusrat Fateh Ali Khan of Pakistan a few decades later.

In 2025, Netflix released a four-part documentary series titled The Roshans. The series traces the artistic lineage from composer Roshan Lal Nagrath to his sons Rakesh Roshan and Rajesh Roshan, and to actor Hrithik Roshan, reflecting on how the family’s creative output helped shape mainstream Bollywood music and cinema.

== Early life and education ==
Roshan was born on 14 July 1917 in Gujranwala in the Punjab Province of British India (now in Punjab, Pakistan). Being born in a Brahmin family, he began music lessons at a young age and later attended Marris College in Lucknow (now Bhatkhande Sanskriti Vishwavidyalaya), United Provinces of Agra and Oudh under the training of Pandit S N Ratanjankar (principal of the institute). Roshan became an accomplished sarod player under the guidance of Allauddin Khan, the renowned sarod player from Maihar. In 1940, Khawaja Khurshid Anwar, programme producer/music, All India Radio Delhi, hired Roshan as staff artist for esraj, the instrument he used to play. He gave up this job in 1948 to seek fame and fortune in Bombay.

== Career ==
In 1948, Roshan came to Bombay to find work as a Hindi film music director and became assistant of music composer Khawaja Khurshid Anwar in film Singaar (1949). He somewhat struggled until he met the producer-director Kidar Sharma, who gave him the job of composing for his film Neki Aur Badi (1949), a film co-produced by Munshiram Varma and distributed by Varma Films. While this film was a flop, Kidar Sharma gave him another chance in his next film. Roshan emerged as a player on the Hindi film music scene with Baawre Nain (1950) which became a big musical hit.

In the early 1950s, Roshan worked with singers Mohammad Rafi, Mukesh and Talat Mahmood. Malhar (1951), Shisham, and Anhonee (1952 film) were some of the movies that he scored during the 1950s. During this time, he also composed the Meera bhajan which became a run-away hit, "Aeiri main to prem diwani mera dard na jane koyi" sung by Lata Mangeshkar for the movie Naubahar (1952).

He was not always commercially successful. He gave Indeewar and Anand Bakshi their first breaks in the Indian film industry as lyricists. Later, they became two of the most sought-after songwriters in Mumbai from the late 1960s onwards.

Anand Bakshi was given his first break in 1956 by the music director Nisar Bazmi in his film Bhala Aadmi (1956). Roshan gave Bakshi the film CID Girl (1959), after Anand Bakshi wrote the four songs of Bhala Aadmi in 1956. Bhala Aadmi was released in 1958 after some delay. Together, Anand Bakshi and Roshan made a super hit musical film Devar (1966).

The 1960s proved to be the golden age for Roshan and his music. His ability to mould folk music with Hindustani classical music became his trademark and resulted in successful movie musicals. During this time, Roshan gave hits such as "Na to karavan ki talaash hai from Barsat Ki Raat" and "Zindagi bhar nahi bhoolegi woh barsaat ki raat" (Barsaat Ki Raat, 1960). Barsaat Ki Raat also was a "super hit" film of 1960s.

"Ab kya misaal doon" and "Kabhi to milegi, kahi to milegi" (Aarti, 1962), "Jo vada kiya vo nibhana padega", "Paao chhoon lene do", "Jo baat tujhmein hai" and "Jurm-e-ulfat pe" (Taj Mahal, 1963), "Nigahen milane ko jee chahata hai" and "Laaga chunari mein daag" (Dil Hi To Hai, 1963), "Sansaar se bhaage phirte ho" and "Man re tu kaahe" (Chitralekha, 1964), and "Oh re taal mile" and "Khushi khushi kar do vida" (Anokhi Raat, 1968). He composed some melodies for the movie Mamta (1966) with lyrics by Majrooh Sultanpuri, "Rehte the kabhi jinke dil mein" and "Rahen Na Rahen Hum" sung by Lata Mangeshkar (and a duet version by Mohammed Rafi and Suman Kalyanpur) and her hit duet, "Chuppa Lo Yun Dil Mein Pyar Mera" with Hemant Kumar. Devar (1966): "Aaya hai mujhe phir yaad woh zalim, guzara zamana bachpan ka"; "Baharon ne mera chaman loot kar"; "Duniya mein aisa kahan sab ka naseeb hai".

== Personal life and death ==
Roshan married Ira Moitra, his second wife, in 1948 and moved to Bombay. Their sons are Rakesh Roshan (born 1949) and Rajesh Roshan (born 1955).

Roshan had been suffering from chronic heart trouble for over 20 years. He had a sudden heart attack while attending a social gathering, and died in Mumbai, Maharashtra, India on 16 November 1967, aged 50.

== Filmography and popular songs ==
| Year | Film | Film song lyricist | Songs and Notes |
|---|---|---|---|
| 1949 | Neki Aur Badi | Kidar Sharma | Roshan's first movie as a composer |
| 1950 | Bawre Nain | Kidar Sharma | Roshan's first breakthrough hit song: "Khayaalon mein kisii ke" sung by Mukesh and Geeta Dutt |
| 1951 | Hum Log | Uddhav Kumar, Vishwamitra Adil | "bahe ankhiyon se dhaar" sung by Lata Mangeshkar, "apni nazar se unki nazar tak" sung by Mukesh |
| 1951 | Malhar | Kaif Irfani, Indeevar | "bade aramaanon se rakhaa hai" sung by Lata Mangeshkar and Mukesh; "kahaa ho tum zaraa aawaaz do" sung by Lata Mangeshkar and Mukesh |
| 1952 | Anhonee | Ali Sardar Jafri, Shailendra | "mere dil kii dhadkan kyaa bole" sung by Lata Mangeshkar and Talat Mahmood |
| 1952 | Naubahar | Meera Bai, Shailendra | "erii main to prem diwani", a Meera bhajan sung by Lata Mangeshkar |
| 1952 | Raagrang | Kaif Irfani, Pyarelal Santoshi, Sarshar Sailani, Prakash Bakshi | "dil-e-beqaraar so jaa" sung by Lata Mangeshkar and Talat Mehmood |
| 1952 | Sanskar | Shailendra | |
| 1952 | Shisham | Uddhav Kumar, Kaif Irfani, Zia Sarhadi, Nazim Panipati, Indeevar, Madhukar Rajasthani | "banayi hai itni badi jis ne duniyaa" sung by Lata Mangeshkar |
| 1953 | Aagosh | Shailendra, Indeevar, Kaif Irfani, Uddhav Kumar | "muhabbat ek sholaa hai" sung by Lata Mangeshkar |
| 1953 | Firdaus | D. N. Madhok, Shailendra | Some songs composed by Robin Chatterjee |
| 1953 | Gunah | Kidar Sharma | Some songs composed by Snehal Bhatkar |
| 1953 | Malkin | Rajendra Krishan | |
| 1953 | Mashuqa | Qamar Jalalabadi, Shailendra | "jhilamil taare" sung by Mukesh, "yeh sama hum tum jawaan", sung by Kishore Kumar and Meena Kappor |
| 1954 | Baap Beti | Kavi Pradeep | |
| 1954 | Baraati | Jan Nisar Akhtar, D.N. Madhok, Raja Mehdi Ali Khan, Tanvir Naqvi | |
| 1954 | Bhairavi | | Abandoned mid-way. Producer : Lata Mangeshkar for Surel Chitra. "Kaahe Tarasaaye Jiyaraa" was recorded for this film but used in Chitralekha many years later |
| 1954 | Chandni Chowk | Majrooh Sultanpuri, Kamil Rashid, Shailendra, Raja Mehdi Ali Khan, Saifuddin Saif | "teraa dil kahaan hai" sung by Asha Bhosle |
| 1954 | Mehbooba | Tanveer Naqvi, Majrooh Sultanpuri, Indeevar | Some songs composed by O. P. Nayyar |
| 1955 | Chhora Chhori | Kidar Sharma, Himmat Rai Sharma, Noor Dewasi | |
| 1955 | Ghar Ghar Mein Diwali | Prem Dhawan, Indeevar | |
| 1955 | Jashan | Rajendra Krishan | |
| 1956 | Rangeen Raten | Kidar Sharma | |
| 1956 | Taksaal | Prem Dhawan | "dil bhii tera, ham bhii tere" sung by Lata Mangeshkar |
| 1957 | Agra Road | Prem Dhawan, Bharat Vyas | |
| 1957 | Coffee House | Prem Dhawan, Shailendra, Hasrat Jaipuri | |
| 1957 | Do Roti | Khumar Barabankvi | |
| 1958 | Aji Bas Shukriya | Faruk Kaiser | "saarii saarii raat terii yaad sataae" sung by Lata Mangeshkar |
| 1958 | Raja Beta | Rajendra Krishan | |
| 1959 | Aangan | Rajendra Krishan, Avinash, Pandit Indra | |
| 1959 | CID Girl | Anand Bakshi, Hasrat Jaipuri | |
| 1959 | Deep Jalta Rahe | Shailendra, Rahil Gorakhpuri | |
| 1959 | Heera Moti | Shailendra, Prem Dhawan | |
| 1959 | Madhu | Shailendra, Naqsh Lyallpuri, Prem Dhawan | |
| 1959 | Maine Jeena Seekh Liya | Rahil Gorakhpuri, Anand Bakshi | "tere pyaar ko is tarah se bhulaanaa" sung by Mukesh |
| 1960 | Babar | Sahir Ludhianvi | "salaam-e-hasrat qabuul kar lo" sung by Sudha Malhotra |
| 1960 | Barsat Ki Rat | Sahir Ludhianvi | The biggest musical film of his career with the most hits. "zindagii bhar nahin bhuulegii vo barsat ki rat" sung by Mohammed Rafi as a solo and in a duet version with Lata Mangeshkar |
| 1961 | Warrant | Prem Dhawan, Anand Bakshi | |
| 1961 | Zindagi Aur Hum | Shiv Kumar Saroj, Veer Muhmmad Puri | "tuu ham ko dekh aur hamaarii nazar se dekh" sung by Lata Mangeshkar |
| 1962 | Aarti | Majrooh Sultanpuri | "aap ne yaad dilaayaa to mujhe yaad aayaa" sung by Rafi and Lata |
| 1962 | Soorat aur Seerat | Shailendra | |
| 1962 | Vallah Kya Baat Hai | Prem Dhawan, Anand Bakshi | |
| 1963 | Commercial Pilot Officer | Anand Bakshi | |
| 1963 | Dil Hi To Hai | Sahir Ludhianvi | "laagaa chunarii mein daag" sung by Manna Dey |
| 1963 | Taj Mahal | Sahir Ludhianvi | Both the song "jo waadaa kiyaa vo nibhaanaa padegaa" sung by Mohammed Rafi and Lata Mangeshkar and the film itself were "super hits" |
| 1964 | Chitralekha | Sahir Ludhianvi | In 2006, the song "man re tuu kaahe na dhiir dhare" sung by Mohammed Rafi was chosen by a jury of professionals in the Indian film industry as the top number one Hindi song |
| 1965 | Bedaag | Shakeel Badayuni, Anand Bakshi | |
| 1965 | Bheegi Raat | Majrooh Sultanpuri | "dil jo na kaha sakaa" in two versions, one each by Mohammed Rafi and Lata Mangeshkar, "aise to na dekho ke bahek jaaye kahin hum" sung by Suman Kalyanpur and Mohammed Rafi |
| 1966 | Daadi Maa | Majrooh Sultanpuri | "usko nahin dekha hamne kabhi" - an ode to the mother, sung by Mahendra Kapoor and Manna Dey |
| 1965 | Nai Umar Ki Nai Fasal | Neeraj, Manmohan Tiwari | "caravan guzar gaya" ("swapna jhare phool se"), sung by Mohammad Rafi |
| 1966 | Devar | Anand Bakshi | |
| 1966 | Mamta | Majrooh Sultanpuri | "rahen na rahen hum" sung by Lata Mangeshkar, with a different version by Mohammed Rafi and Suman Kalyanpur |
| 1967 | Bahu Begum | Sahir Ludhianvi | "ham intazaar karenge teraa qayaamat tak" sung by Asha Bhosle and Mohammed Rafi |
| 1967 | Noor Jehan | Shakeel Badayuni | "sharaabii sharaabii ye saawan kaa mausam" by Suman Kalyanpur |
| 1968 | Anokhi Raat | Indeevar, Kaifi Azmi | "oh re taal mile nadii ke jal mein" sung by Mukesh |
| 1973 | Dur Nahin Manzil | Anjaan, Indeevar | Posthumous Release. Some songs composed by Shankar-Jaikishan |

Television

- The Roshans (archival, 2025)

== Popular film qawwalis ==
- Naa To Kaarvan Ki Talaash Hai in Barsat Ki Rat (1960)
- Yeh Ishq Ishq Hai in Barsat Ki Rat (1960)
- Nigahein Milane Ko Jee Chahta Hai in Dil Hi To Hai (1963)
- Waqif Hoon Khoob Ishq Ke Tarz-E-Bayaan Se Main and Dhundhke Laoon Kahan Se Main in Bahu Begum (1967)

Roshan's marked specialty was the film qawwali. He was widely hailed for their composition.

== Awards ==
- Filmfare Best Music Director Award for film Taj Mahal (1963)
