= Bhagwaan Dada =

1986 Hindi drama film directed by J. Om Prakash

- Poster
- Directed by: J. Om Prakash
- Screenplay by: Ramesh Pant
- Story by: Dr. Rahi Masoom Reza
- Produced by: Rakesh Roshan
- Starring: Rajinikanth; Rakesh Roshan; Sridevi; Tina Munim
- Cinematography: Pushpal Dutta
- Edited by: Nand Kumar
- Music by: Rajesh Roshan
- Release date: 25 April 1986
- Country: India
- Language: Hindi

Bhagwaan Dada is a 1986 Indian Hindi-language drama film directed by J. Om Prakash. The plot is about a criminal who becomes morally redeemed through his love for a child. The film stars Rajinikanth in the title role, with Rakesh Roshan, Sridevi, Tina Munim, Paresh Rawal, Danny Denzongpa and Hrithik Roshan in pivotal roles.

== Plot ==
Bhagwaan, a villager new to the city, turns to crime to survive and joins Shambhu Dada's gang. He avoids violence against women. When a widow Shanti hangs herself after being raped by Shambhu, Bhagwaan adopts her orphaned baby Govinda and vows to change.

Twelve years later, Bhagwaan, now known as Bhagwaan Dada, transforms the slum into a safe neighborhood while raising Govinda. He rescues Swaroop, a naive newcomer, and takes him under his wing after giving him a job. Swaroop tries to save Bijli, a woman attacked by Shambhu's gang, but is beaten and the duo gets rescued by Bhagwaan. Bijli, who is actually a scam artist, gets sheltered by Bhagwaan and his family.

Shambhu seeks revenge and tries to frame Bhagwaan for murder. Inspector Vijay, aware of Shambhu's crimes, helps Bhagwaan set a trap. Shambhu is caught and sentenced to life imprisonment. Bhagwaan invites a journalist Madhu to a celebration in Shantinagar, where Swaroop's attraction to Bijli becomes evident. At Madhu's birthday party, Bijli confesses her love for Swaroop. Meanwhile, Shambhu escapes prison and vows revenge.

Inspector Vijay reveals Bijli's past, leading Bhagwaan to angrily expel her. Later, Bhagwaan and Swaroop learn Bijli's true story of sacrificing her reputation to save her sister Ginni and also learns of Bijli's real identity as Geeta. They find her, and Swaroop's mother welcomes her. Ginni also gets sheltered by them. Preparations for Swaroop and Bijli's wedding begin, but Bhagwaan becomes worried when Govinda and Madhu go missing. Bhagwaan finds a terrified Madhu, who reveals that she and Govinda were kidnapped by Shambhu. Govinda bravely fought to save her but was left mutilated and dying. Govinda dies in Bhagwaan's arms, having sacrificed himself.

Bhagwaan vows revenge and keeps Govinda's death a secret to avoid disrupting Geeta and Swaroop's wedding. During the wedding, Bhagwaan fights Shambhu, ultimately killing him but getting mortally wounded. He blesses the couple with his blood before dying and also reveals about Govinda's death when couple asks how they will console Govinda. Swaroop and Geeta pledge to continue Bhagwaan's legacy.

== Cast ==
- Rajinikanth as Bhagwaan Dada: Govinda's foster father; Swaroop and Madhu's adoptive brother; Shanti Nagar's chief; Shambhu's former henchman turned enemy after he adopts Govinda due to Shanti's suicide
- Rakesh Roshan as Swaroop Dada: Geeta's husband; Bhagwaan's adoptive brother; a letter writer in Shanti Nagar post office
- Sridevi as Geeta aka Bijli: Swaroop's wife; Ginni's sister; a former con-artist to fund Ginni's treatment
- Tina Munim as Madhu: A journalist; Bhagwaan's adoptive sister; Shambhu's rival
- Danny Denzongpa as Shambhu Dada: A local gangster; Bhagwaan and Govinda's murderer
- Hrithik Roshan as Govinda Dada: Shanti's biological son; Bhagwaan's adopted son
- Paresh Rawal as Inspector Vijay
- Satish Shah as Bijli's Patron
- Sujit Kumar as Haji Gaffar Ali Khan: Nirmala's husband
- Om Prakash as Drunken Husband
- Baby Guddu as Ginni: Geeta's sister
- Dipika Chikhlia as Shanti: Govinda's biological mother; a widow raped by Shambhu leading to her suicide

== Music ==
Rajesh Roshan composed five songs penned by Farooq Qaiser and Indeevar. Two of them, "Tujhse Pehle Bematlab Thi Zindagani" and "Aaya Aaya Pyar Ka Zamana" were hits.

List of Bhagwaan Dada songs
| Song | Singer |
|---|---|
| "Tujhse Pehle" - 1 | Kishore Kumar |
| "Tujhse Pehle" - 2 | Kishore Kumar |
| "Super Fast Love" | Kishore Kumar, Anuradha Paudwal |
| "Aaya Aaya Pyar Ka Zamana, Meri Jaan, Saup De Khazana" | Mohammed Aziz, Asha Bhosle |
| "Chug Gayi Chidiya Jo Khet" | Asha Bhosle |
| "Pehli Baar Dil Jala" | Asha Bhosle |
