= Anjali Naidu =

Indian actress

- Occupation: Film actor
- Years active: 1981-1987

Anjali Naidu is an Indian actress. She was a prominent lead actress during the 1980s in Malayalam and Tamil.She made her cinematic debut with the Malayalam film, Mela.

== Partial filmography ==
Year	Film	Role	Language	Co-Stars	Notes
1980	Mela	Sharada	Malayalam	Mammootty, Raghu	Debut movie
1981	Thakilu Kottampuram	Uma	Malayalam	Mohanlal, Prem Nazir	
1982	Ankachamayam	Gayathri	Malayalam	Prem Nazir, Swapna	
1982	Kayam		Malayalam	Shankar Panikkar, Vijayan	
1982	Mylanji		Malayalam	Ambika, Shanavas	
1982	Shriman Shrimati		Hindi	Sanjeev Kumar, Raakhee	
1982	Ee Nadu	Nabeesa	Malayalam	Mammootty, Ratheesh	
1983	Koodevide	Rajamma	Malayalam	Mammootty, Suhasini	
1984	Vetta		Malayalam	Mammootty, Mohanlal	
1985	Ee Thanalil Ithiri Neram		Malayalam	Mammootty, Shobhana	
1987	Ithrayum Kaalam		Malayalam	Mammootty, Seema	
1987	Vamban		Malayalam	Ratheesh, T. G. Ravi	
