= Bahu Begum (film) =

1967 film

- Directed by: M. Sadiq
- Screenplay by: M. Sadiq; Tabish Sultanpuri (dialogue)
- Story by: Jan Nissar Akhtar
- Produced by: Jan Nissar Akhtar
- Starring: Meena Kumari; Ashok Kumar; Pradeep Kumar
- Cinematography: Nariman A. Irani
- Edited by: Moosa Mansoor
- Music by: Roshan; Sahir Ludhianvi (lyrics)
- Release date: 3 February 1967
- Running time: 167 minutes
- Country: India
- Language: Hindi/Urdu

Bahu Begum is a 1967 Hindi film directed by M. Sadiq, and starring Pradeep Kumar, Meena Kumari and Ashok Kumar. The film has music by Roshan and lyrics by Sahir Ludhianvi. This film is known for songs, "Hum Intezaar Karenge Tera Qayamat Tak", sung by Mohammad Rafi and Asha Bhosle and "Duniya Kare Sawaal" by Lata Mangeshkar. The film is a Muslim social period drama set in the erstwhile Era of Lucknow woven around a mythical story of Bahu Begum's manor.

== Plot ==
The film is set in Lucknow, where widower Nawab Mirza Sultan lives with his daughter Zeenat Jahan in an old mansion, and he no longer has much wealth. They pretend to be wealthy, rent out part of the mansion, and the daughter desires luxuries that the father cannot afford. She visits a local jewellery shop to try on jewels (in pretense that she will purchase them) though she cannot afford. There a rich man, Nawab Sikandar Mirza, sees her and falls in love with her. Zeenat, on the other hand, is in love with Nawab Yusuf, and they meet each other at a nearby Sufi shrine every Friday.

In a twist of fate, Yusuf's uncle cunningly fixes her marriage with Nawab Sikandar Mirza, though she assumes it is with Yusuf. When she finds the truth, it is the day of marriage. Dressed as a bride she goes to the local shrine hoping to meet Yusuf there, as it is Friday. But because Yusuf is out of town, he does not show up and Zeenat faints. The wedding ceremony has commenced without her, as everyone assumes that the bride (as per the custom at that time) is in her carriage behind the curtains, and her silence is equivalent to approval. At Nawab Sikander Mirza's Haveli, the 'doli' comes empty. As he doesn't know what happened, he and his sister Suraiya hide the fact that Bahu Begum isn't in the palanquin, proclaiming that she is ill, and thus no one is able to meet her.

Zeenat wakes up at the shrine past midnight and returns home but her disgraced and enraged father asks her to leave. She then goes to Yusuf's house to seek shelter, not knowing that he is out of town, and is told by his maternal uncle, Mir Qurbani Ali, that Yusuf does not love her and has relocated to Allahabad for a few months. She then goes to her in-laws' but is unable to speak freely with her 'husband' as he is angry and distracted. Devastated she runs away to the nearby dargah, but trips and faints in front of a horse carriage being ridden by a courtesan (tawaif), returning from her late night function. Zeenat wakes up at the home of the courtesan, Nazeeran Bai, who had rescued her from the road.

Her misfortune has taken her to a kotha (brothel). Her father and supposed husband, meanwhile, are hiding the truth and pretending all is well in order to keep their honour. But thereafter destiny brings her to the residence of Sikandar Mirza as she is to sit in as "temporary wife" to facilitate the marriage of her supposed sister-in-law Suraiya. When Zeenat arrives, Sikandar Mirza and Suraiya are pleasantly surprised to see that the real bride or the Bahu Begum has finally come to her destination. Her arrival is a great sigh of relief for them and now they show the Bahu Begum to the female relatives (only due to the tradition of Muslim ladies' remaining behind the veil in the presence of the males not closely related to them).

But Zeenat tells Sikandar Mirza that when the Nikah was being performed by the Qaazi (Muslim priest), she was not present and she had not given her consent for the marriage and therefore, she is not his wife as per the law and their religion. However, she adds that she will never leave him, because his honour as well as the honour of his family is too important for her to take any such step, and she will remain the Bahu Begum of the household for the rest of her life.

Sikandar Mirza, being a thorough gentleman and a kind person, is happy with this small consolation too, and does not impose himself upon her. Suraiya is married off under the stewardship of her Bhaabhi, i.e., Zeenat, the highly respected Bahu Begum of the house. But the story gets another twist when Yusuf returns and learns that he has become a victim of his maternal uncle's conspiracy. Deeply hurt to know that his sweetheart has been married to another person but not able to accept the reality, he approaches Zeenat at the house of Sikandar Mirza. Zeenat tells him that though her marriage was not properly executed and therefore she is unmarried in the eyes of the law and the religion, he should forget her as she will never compromise with the honour of Sikandar for the sake of her own happiness. Their conversation is overheard by Sikandar and then he sets his mansion on fire. He dies in it while making it look like that Zeenat died in it as well, to unite the lovers and ensure that they live happily together without the world knowing the truth.

== Cast ==
- Ashok Kumar as Nawab Sikandar Mirza
- Pradeep Kumar as Yusuf
- Meena Kumari as Zeenat Jahan Begum
- Johnny Walker as Achchan
- Naaz as Suraiya
- Lalita Pawar as Naziran Bai
- Leela Mishra as Kariban
- Zeb Rehman as Bilqees
- D. K. Sapru as Nawab Mirza Sultan
- Indira Bansal as Shagufta Begum
- Rajan Haksar as Nawab Pyare Miyan
- Helen as courtesan

== Music ==
The film has music by Roshan with lyrics by Sahir Ludhianvi:

Song	Singer	Raga
"Duniya Kare Sawaal"	Lata Mangeshkar	Khamaj
"Padh Gaye Jhoole, Sawan Rut Aayi Re"	Lata Mangeshkar, Asha Bhosle	
"Sirf Apne Khayalon Ki"	Asha Bhosle	
"Nikle The Kahan"	Asha Bhosle	
"Hum Intezar Karenge Tera Qayamat Tak" (Duet)	Asha Bhosle, Mohammed Rafi	
"Hum Intezar Karenge" (Solo)	Mohammed Rafi	
"Log Kehte Hain Ke"	Mohammed Rafi	
"Waqif Hoon Khoob Ishq Ke Tarz-E-Bayaan Se Main"	Mohammed Rafi, Manna Dey	
"Dhundhke Laoon Kahan Se Main"	Mohammed Rafi, Manna Dey	
