= Karobaar =

- Film poster
- Directed by: Rakesh Roshan
- Written by: Sagar Sarhadi (dialogues)
- Screenplay by: Sachin Bhowmick; Ravi Kapoor
- Produced by: Gava
- Starring: Rishi Kapoor; Anil Kapoor; Juhi Chawla
- Cinematography: Sameer Arya
- Edited by: Sanjay Verma
- Music by: Songs: Rajesh Roshan; Background Score: Surinder Sodhi
- Production company: TVM International
- Release date: 15 September 2000
- Country: India
- Language: Hindi
- Budget: est. ₹6 crore
- Box office: est. ₹2.84 crore

Karobaar: The Business of Love, shortly called Karobaar is a 2000 Indian Hindi romantic thriller film directed by Rakesh Roshan. The film stars Rishi Kapoor (in a Double Role), along with Anil Kapoor, Juhi Chawla in the lead roles. Inspired by Indecent Proposal, the film began production in 1992 and was plagued by production problems and was finally released in 2000.

== Plot ==
Wealthy Rajiv Sinha and middle class Amar Saxena are childhood friends with similar likes. Coincidentally they fall in love with the same girl Seema. Rajiv tries to dissuade Amar from marrying Seema using a pretext but Amar is adamant and marries Seema. Soon he learns Rajiv's pretext was a way of separating him and Seema. They become bitter enemies. Soon Rajiv is charged with killing a girl. Amar, now a lawyer, decides to retaliate against Rajiv.

== Cast ==
- Rishi Kapoor as Advocate Amar Saxena / Rohit Saxena (Double Role)
- Anil Kapoor as Rajiv Sinha
- Juhi Chawla as Seema Saxena
- Tisca Chopra as Neelam
- Navin Nischol as Rajesh Puri
- Tinu Anand as Ramlal Shyamlal
- Asrani as Champak
- Dinesh Hingoo as Bhojwani
- Aasif Sheikh as Ramlal's Son

== Production ==
The film started production in 1993 but faced delays for several years. Rishi Kapoor completed his scenes for the film in May, 1998.

== Soundtrack ==
Karobaar

Soundtrack album by Rajesh Roshan
- Released: 17 June 2000
- Genre: Feature film soundtrack
- Label: Venus Records & Tapes

The music is composed by Rajesh Roshan, while the lyrics are written by Javed Akhtar.

Song	Singer
"Aao Aur Na Socho"	Kumar Sanu
"Suno Na Suno Na"	Kumar Sanu, Alka Yagnik
"Chahiye Milne Ka"	Kumar Sanu, Alka Yagnik
"Aarzoo Ki Rahon"	Udit Narayan, Alka Yagnik
"Duniya Mein Sabse Jo Gehra"	Kumar Sanu, Udit Narayan, Asha Bhosle
"Moujo Mein Ae Sanam"	Alisha Chinoy

== Reception ==
Indu Mirani wrote for Sify that the film had "nothing even remotely attractive about it". In his review for The Tribune, Sanjeev Bariana wrote that the film's "storyline seems unconvincing and rather dragged". Joginder Tuteja described the film as a "mega disaster". Rishita Roy Chowdhury of India Today in a retrospective review in 2021, wrote that "the film tried to add desi twists to the Hollywood hit, Indecent Proposal, and failed miserably."

It performed poorly at the box-office. According to the Indian film trade website Box Office India, it was produced at an estimated budget of ₹6.00 crore (US$620,000) and had a worldwide gross of ₹2.84 crore (US$290,000).
