= Bahurani (1990 film) =

- Directed by: Manik Chatterjee
- Written by: Gyandev Agnihotri
- Produced by: Mohan Lalwani; Prem Lawani
- Starring: Rekha; Rakesh Roshan; Utpal Dutt; Usha Kiran; Deven Verma
- Cinematography: Shashi Kabre
- Edited by: Sudhanshu Chakravorty
- Music by: R. D. Burman
- Release date: 5 January 1990
- Country: India
- Language: Hindi

Bahurani is a 1990 family-drama Indian Hindi film directed by Manik Chatterjee and produced by Mohan Lalwani and Prem Lawani. It starred Rekha, Rakesh Roshan, Utpal Dutt, Usha Kiran, Deven Verma in lead roles. Music was scored by R. D. Burman.

== Plot ==
Amit is a modern guy, raised in Bombay (present-day Mumbai) and educated in USA. He wants to marry a compatible woman who is educated like him and shares his views. To the contrary, his parents fix his marriage with a beautiful, intelligent and traditional village girl, Madhuri. Amit tries to reject but his father adamantly demands that he should marry Madhuri or leave the house. Having no choice, Amit waits for an opportunity.

Madhuri lives along with her widowed mother and her brother Shrikant. Shrikant comes to Amit's house before marriage and Amit's father demands dowry in the form of gold just to make fun of him. He takes that seriously and thinking that the wedding will not take place if he can't get the gold, gets fake jewellery. During the wedding ceremony, Amit observes that and takes that opportunity to reject the bride despite the fact that the wedding has already taken place and Madhuri is his wife now. Amit's parents request Madhuri to wait for some time for Amit to correct his behavior.

But after a year, still Amit wouldn't come back to take Madhuri to her in-laws house. Madhuri wants to get a job in Bombay and goes to an interview. There, she learns that Amit is the boss and is hired anyway. She changes her name to Malathi Choudhury and as Amit hasn't seen her face previously, doesn't recognize her. He develops feelings for Malathi and later she reciprocates them. He wants to marry her, hiding the fact that he is married.

Amit's parents still waiting for Madhuri, learn about Malathi and try to confront her. They recognize Madhuri and want to continue the game. At last, Madhuri's mother reveals Malathi's real identity to Amit and he plays a little drama too. At last, Amit asks for forgiveness and invites Madhuri as daughter-in-law to his house.

== Cast ==
- Rekha as Madhuri / Malti
- Rakesh Roshan as Amit Chaudhary
- Utpal Dutt as Sadanand Chaudhary
- Usha Kiran as Laxmi Chaudhary
- Deven Verma as Kumar Chatterjee
- Urmila Bhatt as Madhuri's Mother
- Rakesh Bedi as Shreekant

== Music ==
Song	Singer
"Woh Kya The"	Asha Bhosle
"Ek Haseena"	Asha Bhosle, Amit Kumar
"Duniya Ki Nazaron Se"	Asha Bhosle, Shailendra Singh
"Katori Pe Katora"	Asha Bhosle, Kavita Krishnamurthy
