= Paraya Dhan =

- Poster
- Directed by: Rajendra Bhatia
- Screenplay by: Ved Rahi; S Khalil (dialogues)
- Story by: Sudhendu Roy
- Produced by: Rajendra Bhatia
- Starring: Balraj Sahni; Rakesh Roshan; Hema Malini
- Cinematography: K. H. Kapadia
- Edited by: Nand Kumar
- Music by: R. D. Burman
- Release date: 3 December 1971
- Country: India
- Language: Hindi

Paraya Dhan (transl. Other's Wealth) is a 1971 Indian Hindi-language drama film directed by Rajendra Bhatia. The film stars Balraj Sahni, Rakesh Roshan, Hema Malini in lead roles.

== Cast ==
- Balraj Sahni as Govindram
- Rakesh Roshan as Shankar
- Hema Malini as Rajni
- Jayshree T. as Meena
- Abhi Bhattacharya as Jwala Sahay
- Achala Sachdev as Mrs. Sahay
- Ajit as Heeralal
- Om Prakash as Gangaram

== Production ==
The film was predominantly shot in Kullu Manali.

== Soundtrack ==
Music for the film was directed by R. D. Burman.

Song	Singer
"Aaj Unse Pehli Mulaqat Hogi"	Kishore Kumar
"Dil Haye Mera Dil"	Kishore Kumar
"Aao Jhoomen Gaayen"	Kishore Kumar, Asha Bhosle
"Tera Mera Juda Hona Mushkil Hai"	Kishore Kumar, Lata Mangeshkar
"Asha Gayi Usha Gayi"	Asha Bhosle
"Holi Re Holi"	Asha Bhosle, Manna Dey
