= Neeyat (1980 film) =

- Theatrical release poster
- Directed by: Anil Ganguly
- Written by: Madan Joshi (dialogues); Indeevar; Gulshan Bawra (lyrics)
- Screenplay by: Ranjan Bose
- Story by: K.A. Narayan
- Produced by: Pradeep Sharma; Manoj Kaytee
- Starring: Shashi Kapoor; Jeetendra; Rakesh Roshan; Rekha
- Cinematography: Dilip R Mukherjee
- Edited by: Muthar Ahmed
- Music by: Kalyanji-Anandji
- Production company: Screen Idol Productions
- Release date: 5 September 1980
- Running time: 146 minutes
- Country: India
- Language: Hindi

Neeyat (transl. Intention) is a 1980 Indian Hindi-language romantic action film, produced by Pradeep Sharma and Manoj Kaytee under the Screen Idol Productions banner and directed by Anil Ganguly. It stars Shashi Kapoor, Jeetendra, Rakesh Roshan, Rekha and Kalyanji Anandji composed the music.

== Plot ==
The film revolves around three childhood soulmates Vijay, Jeet, and Ajay. Jeet is a tycoon, Vijay is the sibling of Arvind a candid journalist and Ajay is a cop. Jeet is so cordial to Vijay's family and comforts Vijay. Coincidentally, the three love the same girl Rekha at different moments, anyhow she reciprocates to Vijay. Besides, Mohanlal Saxena the father of Jeet is a notorious hoodlum under the grab of honorable who kills his partner Gopal Das with a hitman Ranjeet. In which Dinanath the father of Rekha is arraigned. Since Ranveer extorts Saxena, he surrenders him and acquits Dinanath. Afterward, learning Jeet's love, Saxena moves with the proposal which Rekha accepts as gratitude. Hence, Vijay & Ajay are back but Jeet discerns the actuality and misconstrues when a rift arises. Parallelly, Ranjeet absconds and accumulates the pieces of evidence against Saxena, but he is shot. Fortuitously, before dying, he forwards it to Arvind who sets out to expose Mohanlal. So, he slays him too in an accident. Vijay detects it, ergo, discord turns into rivalry between Vijay and Jeet. Moreover, Ranjeet the acolyte of Mohanlal incriminates Vijay as a homicide of woman Mona when duty-bound Ajay chases him. Then, Jeet identifies the satanic shade of his father. At last, he fuses with Vijay and ceases the baddies. Finally, the movie ends with Jeet sacrificing his life while guarding Vijay as penance for his father's sins.

== Cast ==
- Shashi Kapoor as Vijay
- Jeetendra as Jeet
- Rakesh Roshan as Ajay
- Rekha as Rekha
- Shreeram Lagoo as Arvind
- Pinchoo Kapoor as Seth Mohanlal Saxena
- A. K. Hangal as Dinanath, Rekha's father
- Gita Siddharth Mrs Arvind
- Ranjeet as Ranjeet
- Deven Verma as Topi
- Bindu as Mona

== Soundtrack ==
Song	Singer
"Tune Apni Jaan Dekar"	Kishore Kumar
"Pyar Karna Nahin Aaya"	Kishore Kumar
"Hum Teenon Ki Woh Yaari To Lakhon Pe Hai Bhaari, Jaan Le Duniya Yeh Saari"	Kishore Kumar, Mohammed Rafi, Nitin Mukesh
"Mere Yaar Yeh Din Ho Mubarak Tujhe"	Mohammed Rafi, Amit Kumar
"Tumhe Aise Kaise De Doon"	Asha Bhosle
"Pyase Dil Ki Pyas Bujhane"	Asha Bhosle
