= Kaun Sachcha Kaun Jhootha =

- Directed by: Partho Ghosh
- Screenplay by: Ranbir Pushp
- Story by: Ranbir Pushp
- Produced by: Kamlesh Doshi; Rakesh Roshan
- Starring: Rishi Kapoor; Sridevi; Suresh Oberoi; Mohnish Bahl
- Cinematography: K.V. Ramanna
- Edited by: Sanjay Verma
- Music by: Rajesh Roshan
- Release date: 11 April 1997
- Country: India
- Language: Hindi
- Budget: ₹2 crore
- Box office: ₹1.27 crore

Kaun Sachcha Kaun Jhootha is a 1997 Hindi-language thriller film which was released on 11 April 1997. The film was directed by Partho Ghosh. It starred Rishi Kapoor and Sridevi.

== Plot ==
Plainclothes police officer Karan Saxena (Rishi Kapoor) is assigned the task of apprehending the killer of a fellow officer. The murder was committed by a woman named Dr Sapna Mathur (Sridevi). With the help of IG Suryakant Verma, Saxena is able to apprehend Mathur and obtain a taped confession. However, instead of closing the case, Saxena finds himself intrigued by Sapna and conducts further research into her case. Ultimately, he falls in love with her. Despite his efforts, Sapna is sentenced to death. He helps her escape and seeks the help of IG Suryakant Verma and the state's chief minister, Aloknath. However, he then discovers that the police have launched a manhunt for him and Sapna. He realises that the case is more complicated than he thought and involves many people in power, including his friends. He also has to face a mysterious adversary who follows him everywhere, and neither he nor Sapna has any idea what will happen next.

== Cast ==
- Rishi Kapoor as CBI Officer Karan Saxena
- Sridevi as Madhu Mathur / Dr. Sapna Mathur
- Suresh Oberoi as IG Suryakant Verma
- Mohnish Behl as Manish Rawat
- Gulshan Grover as K. Kaushal (guest appearance)
- Tinnu Anand as Ramu Kaka
- Alok Nath as Deepak Seth Chief Minister
- Aashif Sheikh as John D'Souza

== Soundtrack ==
All songs were composed by Rajesh Roshan and lyrics were penned by Sameer.

Some music from Dr. Alban's "Mata Oh" has been used in the song "Chanchal Hawao Si." Similarly, A. R. Rahman’s superhit song ‘Thenmerku Paruva Kaatru’ from Tamil film 'Karuthamma' were copied as ‘Hum Do Deewane’.

- "Adha Chand Adhi Raat" - Jyoti
- "Chanchal Hawaon Se" - Alka Yagnik
- "Chhal Kiya Tu" - Udit Narayan, Preeti Uttam
- "Dil Se Judi Dil" - Kumar Sanu, Alka Yagnik
- "Hum Do Deewane" - Abhijeet Bhattacharya, Kavita Krishnamurthy
- "Vaadon Ki Suhaani Shaam" - Kumar Sanu, Kavita Krishnamurthy
