= Aakhir Kyon? =

1985 Indian Hindi film

- Directed by: J. Om Prakash
- Written by: Achala Nagar
- Produced by: J. Om Prakash
- Starring: Rajesh Khanna; Smita Patil; Rakesh Roshan; Tina Munim
- Cinematography: V. Babasaheb
- Edited by: Nand Kumar
- Music by: Rajesh Roshan
- Distributed by: Eros International; Shemaroo Video Pvt. Ltd.
- Release date: 30 August 1985
- Country: India
- Language: Hindi

Aakhir Kyon? (transl. But why?) is a 1985 Indian Hindi-language film produced and directed by J. Om Prakash. It stars Rajesh Khanna, Smita Patil, Rakesh Roshan and Tina Munim.

== Plot ==
Nisha (Smita Patil) is an orphan adopted by her relatives and raised alongside her cousin, Indu (Tina Munim). Indu falls in love with the rich and good-looking Kabir (Rakesh Roshan). However, Kabir takes a liking to the more traditional Nisha and marries her. Indu is dismayed. The happy-go-lucky Nisha is oblivious to Kabir's affairs and dalliances with other women, that he indulges on the pretext of business trips.

Nisha becomes pregnant. and her doctor deems the pregnancy is complicated. Indu's mother (Shubha Khote) asks, Indu to move in with Nisha and Kabir and take care of Nisha. As Nisha becomes restricted in her daily activities, Indu gets closer to Kabir and engages in an extramarital affair with him. Nisha delivers a baby girl. On discovering the affair between her husband and cousin, she is shattered and confronts them. Kabir refuses to end his affair and asks her to adjust to the change. Nisha leaves the house, handing her daughter's responsibilities to the maid.

Nisha struggles to survive in the male-dominated world. She becomes friends with Alok (Rajesh Khanna). Nisha remains focused on her work and becomes a successful author. Kabir and Indu's financial situation worsens and they start realising their mistake.

As Nisha and Kabir's daughter becomes of marriageable age, a worried Kabir is unsure how he would afford such an alliance, but Nisha rescues Kabir by selling him her publishing rights henceforth and forwarding the royalties for life. Kabir apologises for whatever happened and repents deeply, leaving Nisha to comment that she has moved on and does not want her daughter to know her identity and the pain of knowing her mother's painful fate.

Alok meets with Nisha and tells her that its time for them to officiate their relationship. Nisha resists, still clinging to her traditional values. Alok confronts her with a question "Akhir Kyon?" (Why So?) - when she was going through marital troubles, society blamed her and refused to support her; so why worry about society now? Alok applies sindoor.

== Cast ==
- Rajesh Khanna as Aloknath
- Smita Patil as Nisha Suri
- Rakesh Roshan as Kabir Suri
- Tina Munim as Indu Sharma
- Asrani as Radha Raman Goswami
- Sujit Kumar as Mr. S. Kumar
- Shobha Khote as Indu's Mother
- Beena Banerjee as Abha

== Soundtrack ==
The movie had good soundtrack and many memorable songs composed by Rajesh Roshan.

Song	Singer
"Sham Hui, Chadh Aayi Re"	Lata Mangeshkar
"Dushman Na Kare, Dost Ne Woh Kaam Kiya Hai"	Lata Mangeshkar, Amit Kumar
"Saat Rang Mein Khel Rahi Hai Dilwalon Ki Toli Re"	Anuradha Paudwal, Amit Kumar
"Ek Andhera, Lakh Sitare"	Mohammed Aziz
"Komal Hai, Kamzor Nahin Tu"	Asha Bhosle
