= Ira Roshan =

Indian singer

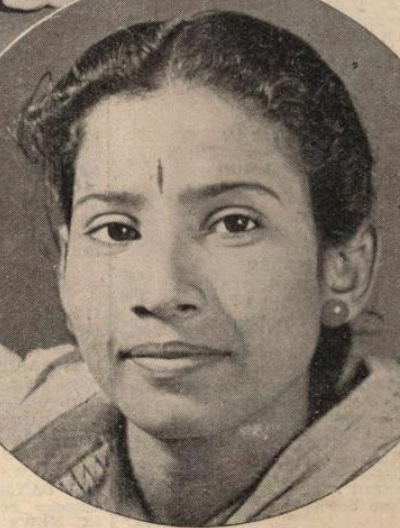
- Ira Maitra (later Nagrath), from a 1947 issue of The Indian Listener
- Born: Ira Maitra
- Died: 22 January 2005
- Other name: Ira Nagrath
- Occupations: Singer, composer
- Spouse: Roshan Lal Nagrath (m. 1948; died 1967)
- Children: Rakesh Roshan; Rajesh Roshan
- Relatives: See Roshan family

Ira Nagrath (née Maitra; died 22 January 2005), known as Ira Roshan, was an Indian singer and composer, wife of music director Roshan, mother of actor and film director Rakesh Roshan and music director Rajesh Roshan, and paternal grandmother of actor Hrithik Roshan.

== Career ==
As a young woman belonging to a Bengali family, Ira Maitra was a singer heard on All India Radio in Delhi. She had musical (off-screen) credits on several films, including Anokhi Raat (1968), Shakka (1981), Aap Mujhe Achche Lagne Lage (2002), and Prateeksha (2006). She sang a duet with Lata Mangeshkar for the film Anokha Pyar (1948), and completed recording a film score left unfinished when her composer husband died suddenly.

== Personal life ==
In 1948, Ira Maitra married music director Roshan Lal Nagrath as his second wife, and moved to Bombay. Roshan went on to become one of the greatest music directors from the Golden Era of Hindi Cinema. Their sons are Rakesh Roshan (born 1949) and Rajesh Roshan (born 1955). She was widowed when Roshan died suddenly from a heart attack in 1967; she died in 2005. Actor Hrithik Roshan is her grandson. Her granddaughter, Sunaina Roshan, published a family history titled To Dad With Love (2014), with many pictures and anecdotes about Moitra and Roshan's household. In 2008, the speech and hearing wing of Nanavati Hospital in Mumbai was named for Ira Roshan.
