= Kites (film) =

2010 Indian film by Anurag Basu

- Theatrical release poster
- Directed by: Anurag Basu
- Screenplay by: Robin Bhatt; Akarsh Khurana; Anurag Basu
- Story by: Rakesh Roshan
- Produced by: Rakesh Roshan (Hindi version); Brett Ratner (English version)
- Starring: Hrithik Roshan; Bárbara Mori; Kangana Ranaut; Kabir Bedi; Nicholas Brown
- Cinematography: Ayananka Bose
- Edited by: Akiv Ali; Mark Helfrich (English version)
- Music by: Songs: Rajesh Roshan; Background Score: Salim–Sulaiman
- Production company: Filmkraft Productions
- Distributed by: Reliance BIG Pictures
- Release date: 21 May 2010
- Running time: 130 minutes (Hindi version with most dialogue in Spanish and English); 90 minutes (English version)
- Country: India
- Languages: Spanish; English; Hindi
- Budget: ₹82 crore
- Box office: ₹65 crore

Kites is a 2010 Indian romantic action film directed by Anurag Basu, with the story written and produced by Rakesh Roshan. The film stars Hrithik Roshan, Bárbara Mori, Kangana Ranaut, and Kabir Bedi.

Presented in English as Kites: The Remix by Brett Ratner, the film was released in India and in North America on 21 May 2010. Its 208-theater opening in North America made it the largest Bollywood release up to that time. It was also the first Bollywood film to reach the weekend top ten, though My Name is Khan had a larger first-weekend North American gross. Despite a strong opening, the film only managed to collect ₹47 crore (US$10.28 million) net in its lifetime run following a critical loss. Domestically, one of the major criticisms aimed at the film was towards the multilingual narrative that featured the majority of dialogue in Spanish and English, while it was advertised as a Hindi-language film.

== Plot ==
Jay Ray is a dance teacher in Las Vegas, Nevada. As a side hustle, he marries immigrant women to get them green cards in exchange for money. When Gina, the rich daughter of a powerful Anglo-Indian casino owner, Bob Grover, falls for him, Jay goes along to marry into money. He discovers that his future brother-in-law, the vicious, homicidal Tony, is about to marry a Mexican woman named Natasha, whom Jay knows as Linda, the last of the immigrant women he married. On the night before "Natasha" and Tony's wedding, Linda and Jay humorously agree to a "divorce". A jealous, gun-wielding Tony arrives at her apartment while Jay is there. After he hits her, Linda impulsively knocks him out with a heavy object while he tussles with J. Linda and Jay go on the run toward Mexico, with Tony and the police in pursuit. They are helped by a friend of J, Robin. Robin gives them fake passports and IDs so that they can escape and build the life they want.

In the following week, Jay and Linda get married in Mexico. On the day of their wedding, they come back to their house. There, Robin comes to give them the passports and is unexpectedly shot by Tony and his men. Linda and Jay escape, but Jay is shot in the process. During a car chase, Linda stops the car by a train, puts Jay aboard it, and drives off. Back in the present, J meets with Jamaal, one of Bob's employees, and is ambushed. Jamaal is killed, but not before telling Jay of Linda's whereabouts. Jay kills off all of Tony's men and then kills Tony by smashing his face into the car door and he is then shot by Gina. He drives off to the location where Jamaal said Linda was last seen. It is shown that after Jay was put aboard the train, Linda was ambushed on a cliff and sent Jay a text message saying, "I am going...Sorry, forget me." She drives off of the cliff, killing herself by drowning. Jay cries and then smiles, jumping off the cliff as well. Finally, he is reunited with Linda under the ocean, and they embrace in death.

== Cast ==
- Hrithik Roshan as Jay Ray
- Bárbara Mori as Linda/Natasha
- Nicholas Brown as Tony Grover
- Kabir Bedi as Bob Grover
- Madhuri Bhatia as Gina's mother
- Anand Tiwari as Robin
- Yuri Suri as Jamaal, Bob's family chauffeur
- Kangana Ranaut as Gina Grover
- Steven Michael Quezada as a cop (uncredited)

== Production ==
=== Casting ===
Deepika Padukone was approached to star opposite Hrithik Roshan, although she turned down the offer for undisclosed reasons.

=== Pre-release revenues ===
Kites's worldwide distribution rights were sold for ₹1.5 billion (US$32.8 million) to Reliance big pictures in 2010 (except Mumbai). The satellite rights were bought by Sony TV group, while the music rights were bought by T-series/Big music.

== Music ==
Kites music album was composed by Rajesh Roshan, with lyrics penned by Nasir Faraaz and Asif Ali Beg. The songs "Dil Kyon Yeh Mera" and "Zindagi Do Pal Ki" (both sung by KK) became a rage while other songs were also successful. Rajiv Vijayakar of Indian Express wrote, "Go for Kites, there are no strings attached to this melodious flight in 2010s best score till now since Veer". Variety Magazine said the music "ranges from hip-hop to Enya-esque ululating."

Track listing
No.	Title	Singer(s)	Length
1.	"Zindagi Do Pal Ki"	KK	4:13
2.	"Dil Kyun Yeh Mera Shor Kare"	KK	5:33
3.	"Tum Bhi Ho Wahi"	Vishal Dadlani, Suraj Jagan	3:52
4.	"Kites in the Sky"	Hrithik Roshan, Suzanne D'Mello	5:40
5.	"Fire"	Rajesh Roshan, Vishal Dadlani, Anirudh Bhola, Anushka Manchada	4:25
6.	"Zindagi Do Pal Ki (Remix)"	KK, DJ A-Myth	3:45
7.	"Dil Kyun Yeh Mera (Remix)"	KK, DJ A-Myth	4:36
8.	"Tum Bhi Ho Wahi (Remix)"	Vishal Dadlani, Suraj Jagan, DJ A-Myth	3:29
9.	"Fire (English version)"	Rajesh Roshan, Vishal Dadlani, Anirudh Bhola, Anushka Manchada	4:26
Total length:			40:59

== Release ==
Kites was on 3000 screens in India, and across 30 countries and 500 screens globally, according to distributor Reliance BIG Entertainment. It opened on 208 screens in North America, making it the largest Bollywood release there to that time.

=== Promotion ===
To help promote the film, mini "music videos" were released online, each about one minute long and featuring a song from the soundtrack set against scenes from the film. The clothing brand Provogue, which features Hrithik Roshan as its brand ambassador, launched a Kites clothing range. A photo shoot for the campaign was shot in the Maldives, featuring Hrithik Roshan and Bárbara Mori.

=== International versions ===
While the Hindi version of Kites with most dialogue in Spanish was released on 21 May 2010 in India, the international version was released one week later, on 28 May 2010. The film was scheduled to be released in over 60 countries.

Kites was released in a second international English-language version as Kites: The Remix, "Presented By" Brett Ratner, recut by his regular editor, Mark Helfrich, with new music by Graeme Revell using remix techniques developed in the series Kung Faux.

== Reception ==
=== Critical reception ===
On the review aggregator website Rotten Tomatoes, 70% of 27 critics' reviews are positive. The website's consensus reads: "Thoroughly overwrought in true Bollywood fashion, Kites is deeply flawed —and too effervescently charming to resist." Metacritic, which uses a weighted average, assigned the film a score of 62 out of 100, based on 13 critics, indicating "generally favorable" reviews.

The film generally received mixed reviews in India. The chemistry of the lead actors and the cinematography were specifically praised by Indian critics like Anupama Chopra and Raja Sen. Rajeev Masand of IBN said "Thrilling action set-pieces, a super-fluid dance number to show off Hrithik's killer moves, and repeated glimpses at the toned bodies of both lead stars. It's almost enough to forgive the uniformly bad acting of all supporting cast". Anupama Chopra of NDTV said "the film doesn't become more than the sum of its parts because the second half is flat and in places, outright foolish".

In the U.S., Jeannette Catsoulis of The New York Times called it "a lovers-on-the-lam blast of pure pulp escapism" that "caroms from car chase to shootout, from rain dancing to bank robbing with unflagging energy. It's all completely loony, but the stunts are impressive, the photography crisp and the leads so adorably besotted that audiences might as well check their cynicism at the door." Frank Lovece of Film Journal International said, "Bollywood enters telenovela territory in a hybrid film that takes the heightened emotions, wild tonal ranges and impeccably crisp technique of modern Hindi cinema and puts all that in the service of a tragic love story straight out of Mexican TV. ... As an old-style Hollywood romance in modern dress, it delivers what people say they want when they say, 'They don't make pictures like that anymore.'" Kevin Thomas of the Los Angeles Times said the film "draws from westerns, musicals, film noir [and] chase thrillers with stunts so preposterous they verge on parody – and it gets away with everything because of [director] Basu's visual bravura and unstinting passion and energy."

=== Box office ===
==== India ====
Box Office India said the film "opened to a bumper response at most places" in India, but noted "reports are not encouraging, the biggest reason for failure are being the film has a lot of Spanish dialogue and English." The film collected ₹49.27 crore (US$10.78 million) net in its lifetime run in India.

==== Overseas ====
On its first weekend in the North America, the film opened in 208 theaters and ranked No. 10 in the box office, grossing $958,673. It was the first Bollywood movie to reach the weekend top ten, though My Name is Khan had a larger first-weekend North American gross, with $1.9 million at 120 theaters, reaching #13. Kites debuted at No. 10 in the UK, with an opening of £174,000 from 70 screens. Overall, the film was rated as a flop by Box Office India.

The film fared very poorly in the United Kingdom and earned £9,110 on 31 screens, with the per-screen average working out to £294. In the first week that both films were out together in the United States, Kites: The Remix did only one tenth of the business that the original Kites did, and less than half on a per-screen basis. Box Office Mojo shows that while the original Kites film was able to become the first ever original Bollywood created film to score in the "Top Ten" of the overall Hollywood Box office tally on its opening weekend, the Kites: The Remix hybrid version only managed to place 51st on its first weekend.

== Awards and nominations ==
=== 2011 Zee Cine Awards ===
Won

- Best Cinematography - Ayananka Bose

Nominated

- Best Female Debut - Bárbara Mori
- Best Playback Singer Male - KK for "Zindagi Do Pal Ki"

=== 2011 BIG Star Entertainment Awards ===
Nominated

- Best Playback Singer Male - KK for "Zindagi Do Pal Ki"

=== 2011 GIMA Awards ===
Nominated

- Best Playback Singer Male - KK for "Zindagi Do Pal Ki"
