= Dil Hi To Hai (1963 film) =

- Poster
- Directed by: C. L. Rawal; P. L. Santoshi
- Written by: C. L. Rawal
- Produced by: B. L. Rawal
- Starring: Raj Kapoor; Nutan; Pran
- Cinematography: Dharam Chopra
- Edited by: Pran Mehra
- Music by: Roshan
- Distributed by: Rawal Films
- Release date: 1963
- Country: India
- Language: Hindi

Dil Hi To Hai (It's the heart, after all) is a 1963 Indian Bollywood film directed by C. L. Rawal, P. L. Santoshi and produced by B. L. Rawal. It stars Raj Kapoor, Nutan in pivotal roles.

== Plot ==
Yusuf (Raj Kapoor) lives a poor lifestyle along with his foster mother (Leela Chitnis) & sister Razia (Sabita Chatterjee), who is married to Basheer (Agha), still not lives with him due to some conditions. Yusuf is a promising singer, sings under the pseudonym Chand, meets with Jameela (Nutan), the only daughter of Khan Bahadur (Nazir Hussain) in a reception & listening to his song she decides to take lessons of singing from him. One day, an Ustad named Khan was absent for a stage show & it's organiser Basheer requests Yusuf to take his place, which he reluctantly agrees & performs, it is shown by Khan Bahadur & Shaikhu (Pran) and appoint him for Jameela's training. On the other side, Yusuf & Jameela fall for each other, must to the chargin of Shaikhu. Khan Bahadur wants Jameela would be married to Shaikhu, but he doesn't know Shaikhu has another intention to marry Jameela for usurping their wealth. What will be the next? Could Yusuf save Jameela & Khan Bahadur from the lust Shaikhu? form the climax.

== Cast ==
- Raj Kapoor as Yusuf / Chand / Khan
- Nutan as Jameela Banu
- Pran as Shaikhu / Yusuf
- Agha as Basheer
- Nazir Hussain as Khan Bahadur
- Hari Shivdasani as Yusuf's Father
- Mumtaz Begum as Yusuf's Mother
- Leela Chitnis as Yusuf's Foster Mother
- Shivraj as Shaikhu's Father
- Manorama as Shaikhu's Mother
- Padmini Priyadarshini as Bahar
- Sabita Chatterjee as Razia

== Music ==
Songs of the film and its music were highly popular. The songs were penned by lyricist Sahir Ludhianvi, and their music was composed by Roshan. It has popular songs like "Nigahen Milane Ko Jee Chahta Hai", sung by Asha Bhosle and "Laaga Chunri Mein Daag", sung by Manna Dey.

Song	Singer	Raga
"Nigahen Milane Ko"	Asha Bhosle	Yaman Kalyan
"Parda Uthe Salaam Ho Jaaye"	Asha Bhosle, Manna Dey	
"Laaga Chunri Mein"	Manna Dey	Bhairavi (Hindustani)
"Yun Hi Dil Ne Chaha"	Suman Kalyanpur	
"Chura Le Na Tumko Yeh Mausam Suhana"	Suman Kalyanpur, Mukesh	
"Tumhari Mast Nazar Gar Idhar Nahin Hoti"	Lata Mangeshkar, Mukesh	
"Gusse Mein Jo Nakhra"	Mukesh	
"Tum Agar Mujhko Na"	Mukesh	
"Dil Hi To Hai" (Happy)	Mukesh	
"Dil Hi To Hai" (Sad)	Mukesh	
