= Hrithik Roshan filmography =

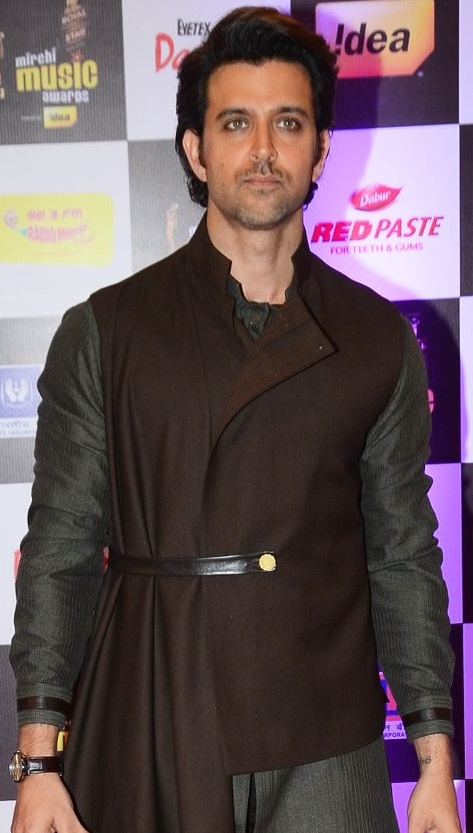
Roshan in 2016

Hrithik Roshan is an Indian actor known for his work in Hindi-language films. As a child, he made uncredited appearances in three films directed by his maternal grandfather, J. Om Prakash, the first of which was in Aasha (1980). In 1986, Roshan played the adopted son of Rajinikanth's character in Prakash's crime drama Bhagwaan Dada. Roshan subsequently worked as an assistant director on four films, including Khudgarz (1987) and Karan Arjun (1995), all of which were directed by his father, Rakesh.

Roshan's first leading role came opposite Ameesha Patel in Kaho Naa... Pyaar Hai (2000), a highly successful romantic drama directed by his father, for which he won two Filmfare Awards—Best Male Debut and Best Actor. In 2001, Roshan played a supporting role in Karan Johar's lucrative ensemble melodrama Kabhi Khushi Kabhie Gham. This initial success was followed by roles in a series of critical and commercial failures, including Aap Mujhe Achche Lagne Lage (2002) and Main Prem Ki Diwani Hoon (2003), leading critics to believe that Roshan's career was over. His career prospects improved in 2003 when he played the role of a mentally disabled teenager in his father's science fiction film Koi... Mil Gaya. The film emerged as one of the highest-grossing Bollywood film of that year and earned Roshan the Best Actor – Critics and the Best Actor awards at Filmfare. His next release, the war drama Lakshya (2004), performed poorly at the box office despite earning positive reviews.

In 2006, Roshan starred in two top-grossing productions of the year. He portrayed the eponymous superhero in Krrish, a sequel to Koi... Mil Gaya, and won another Best Actor award at Filmfare for playing a thief in the adventure film Dhoom 2. Two years later, he gained a fourth Best Actor award at Filmfare for playing the Mughal emperor Akbar in Ashutosh Gowariker's period romance Jodhaa Akbar (2008). Roshan starred in two commercially unsuccessful films of 2010—Kites and Guzaarish—but earned praise for portraying a quadriplegic magician in the latter. In 2011, he featured as a talent judge for the television dance reality show Just Dance. Roshan also played one of the three leads alongside Farhan Akhtar and Abhay Deol in the Zoya Akhtar-directed comedy-drama Zindagi Na Milegi Dobara (2011), following which he played a man seeking vengeance in Agneepath (2012), a remake of the 1990 film of the same name. In 2013, Roshan starred in the third installment of the Krrish franchise, and the following year, he starred in Bang Bang!, a remake of the 2010 Hollywood film Knight and Day. These films rank among his biggest commercially successes. In 2019, Roshan starred in the biopic Super 30, in which he portrayed the mathematician Anand Kumar, and in the action thriller War, which ranks as his highest-grossing release. His first film in three years, the action thriller Vikram Vedha (2022), was not financially profitable despite positive reviews. His most recent release, YRF Spy Universe's War 2 was a commercial failure, despite its high anticipation.

== Film ==
Key
†	Denotes films that have not yet been released

- Note: All films are in Hindi, unless stated otherwise.

Year	Title	Role	Notes	Ref.
1980	Aasha	Unnamed	Uncredited appearance in the song "Jaane Hum Sadak Ke Logon"	
1980	Aap Ke Deewane	Young Rahim	Uncredited appearance	
1981	Aas Paas	Unnamed	Uncredited appearance in the song "Shehar Main Charchi Hai"	
1983	Aasra Pyaar Da	Unknown	Uncredited appearance; Punjabi film	
1986	Bhagwaan Dada	Govinda Dada	Child artist	
1987	Khudgarz	—	Assistant director	
1993	King Uncle	—	Assistant director	
1995	Karan Arjun	—	Assistant director	
1997	Koyla	—	Assistant director	
2000	Kaho Naa... Pyaar Hai	Rohit Kumar and Raj Chopra (Note: Roshan played dual roles in the film.)		
2000	Fiza	Amaan Ikramullah		
2000	Mission Kashmir	Altaaf Khan		
2001	Yaadein	Ronit Malhotra		
2001	Kabhi Khushi Kabhie Gham	Rohan Raichand		
2002	Aap Mujhe Achche Lagne Lage	Rohit Malhotra		
2002	Na Tum Jaano Na Hum	Rahul Sharma		
2002	Mujhse Dosti Karoge!	Raj Khanna		
2003	Main Prem Ki Diwani Hoon	Prem Kishen Mathur		
2003	Koi... Mil Gaya	Rohit Mehra		
2004	Lakshya	Captain Karan Shergill		
2006	Krrish	Krishna "Krrish" Mehra and Dr. Rohit Mehra		
2006	Dhoom 2	Aryan "Mr. A" Singhania and Queen Elizabeth II		
2006	I See You	Unnamed	Special appearance in the song "Subah Subah"	
2007	Om Shanti Om	Himself	Special appearance	
2008	Jodhaa Akbar	Jalaluddin Mohammad Akbar		
2008	Krazzy 4	Himself	Special appearance in the song "Krazzy 4"	
2009	Luck by Chance	Ali Zaffar Khan	Special appearance	
2010	Kites	Jay Ray	Also playback singer for the song "Kites in the Sky"	
2010	Guzaarish	Ethan Mascarenhas		
2011	Zindagi Na Milegi Dobara	Arjun Saluja	Also playback singer for the song "Señorita"	
2011	Don 2	Don	Special appearance	
2012	Agneepath	Vijay Deenanath Chauhan		
2013	Main Krishna Hoon	Himself	Cameo	
2013	Krrish 3	Krishna "Krrish" Mehra and Dr. Rohit Mehra		
2014	Bang Bang!	Jai Nanda / alias / Rajveer Nanda		
2015	Hey Bro	Unnamed	Special appearance in the song "Birju"	
2016	Mohenjo Daro	Sarman		
2017	Kaabil	Rohan Bhatnagar		
2017	Hrudayantar	Krishna "Krrish" Mehra	Special appearance; Marathi film	
2019	Super 30	Anand Kumar	Also playback singer for the song "Question Mark"	
2019	War	Major Kabir Dhaliwal		
2022	Vikram Vedha	Vedha Betal		
2023	Tiger 3	Major Kabir Dhaliwal	Cameo	
2024	Fighter	Squadron Leader Shamsher "Patty" Pathania		
2025	War 2	Major Kabir Dhaliwal		
2026	Alpha	Major Kabir Dhaliwal	Cameo	
2026	Jailer 2	Roddy	Tamil film; Cameo appearance	

== Television ==
Year	Title	Role	Notes	Ref.
2001	The World History of Organized Crime	Himself	Television documentary	
2008	Junoon — Kuch Kar Dikhane Ka	Host	Reality show	
2011	Just Dance	Judge	Reality show	
2023	The Romantics	Himself	Documentary	
2024	Angry Young Men	Himself	Documentary	
2025	The Roshans	Himself	Documentary	

== Music video ==
Year	Title	Performer(s)	Album	Ref.
2010	"Lets Party"	Ganesh Hedge	—	
2015	"Dheere Dheere"	Yo Yo Honey Singh	—	
2016	"Ae Raju"	6 Pack Band	—	
2021	"DNA Mein Dance"	Vishal–Shekhar	Free Fire	

== See also ==
- Awards and nominations received by Hrithik Roshan
