= Deroche (disambiguation) =

Deroche or DeRoche may refer to:

== Geography ==
- Deroche, an unincorporated community in southwestern British Columbia, Canada

== Surname ==
- Catherine Deroche (born 1953), French politician
- Craig M. DeRoche (born 1970), American politician
- Elise Deroche (1882–1919), also known as Raymonde de Laroche, French pilot
- Tim DeRoche, American writer
