= United States Special Envoy to the Organisation of Islamic Cooperation =

Diplomatic envoy

The United States representative to the Organisation of Islamic Cooperation (full title: Representative of the United States of America to the Organisation of Islamic Cooperation) serves as the official representative of the United States of America to the OIC in Jeddah, Saudi Arabia. Established in 2008, the first two U.S. Representatives held the title of Special Envoy and were based in Washington, D.C. After five years without a permanent representative, starting in 2020 the U.S. Consul General in Jeddah, Saudi Arabia was given the concurrent accreditation as official U.S. Representative to the OIC.

| No. | Image | US Representative to the OIC | Years served | O.I.C. Secretary-General | U.S. President |
|---|---|---|---|---|---|
| 1 | | Sada Cumber | 2008–2009 | Ekmeleddin İhsanoğlu | George W. Bush |
| 2 | | Rashad Hussain | 2010–2015 | Ekmeleddin İhsanoğlu | Barack H. Obama |
| 2 | | Rashad Hussain | 2010–2015 | Iyad bin Amin Madani | Barack H. Obama |
| 3 | | Ryan M. Gliha | 2020–2021 | Yousef Al-Othaimeen | Donald Trump |
| 3 | | Ryan M. Gliha | 2020–2021 | Yousef Al-Othaimeen | Joseph Biden |
| 4 | | Faris Y. Asad | 2021–2025 | Hissein Brahim Taha | Joseph Biden |
