= Tim DeRoche =

American writer

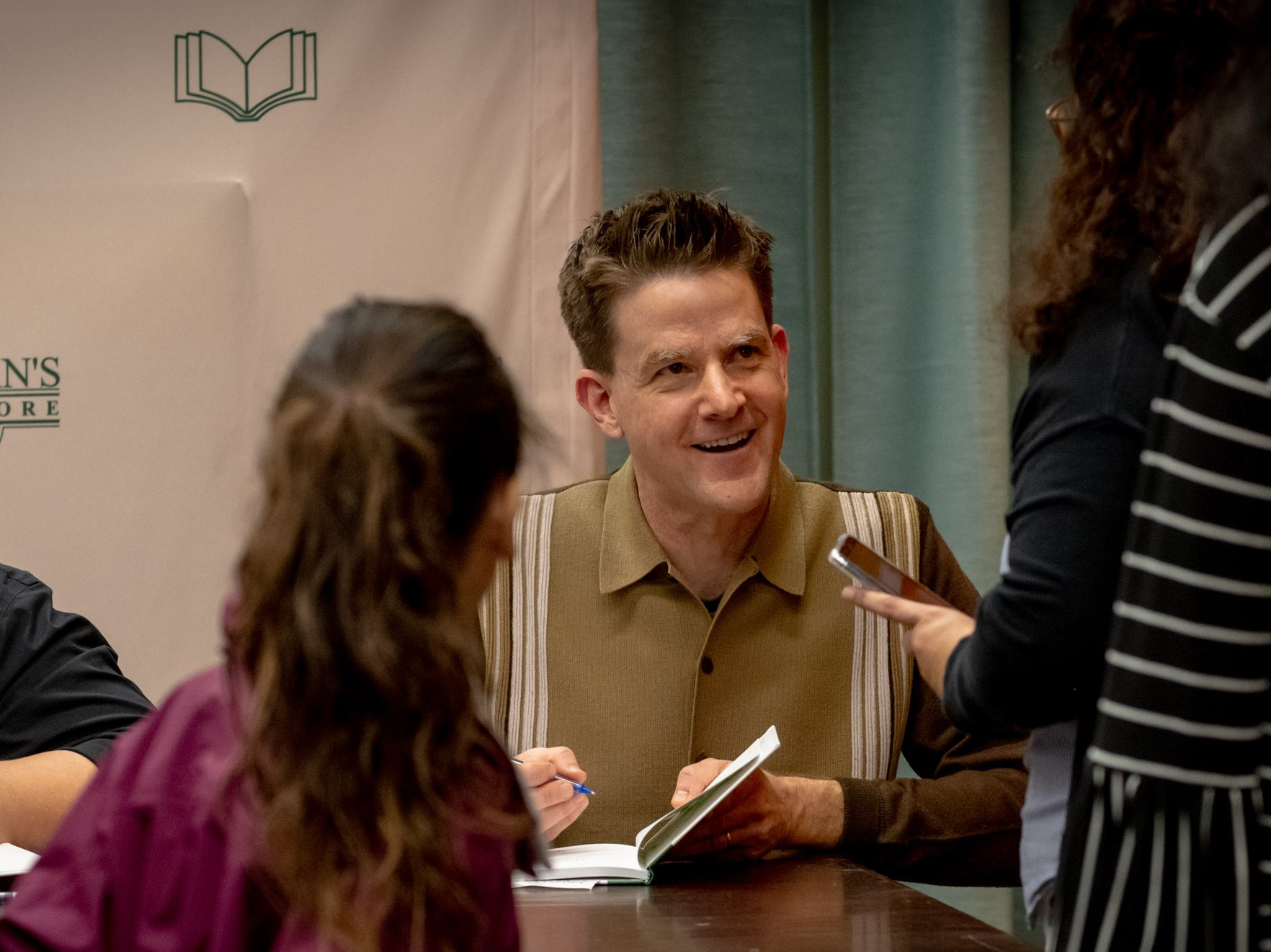
- Tim DeRoche
- Born: Timothy DeRoche; Milwaukee, Wisconsin
- Education: Pomona College (B.A., English Literature)
- Occupation: Writer
- Notable work: The Ballad of Huck & Miguel; A Fine Line; Tales of Whimsy, Verses of Woe

Tim DeRoche is an American writer. He has written books such as The Ballad of Huck & Miguel, A Fine Line, and Tales of Whimsy, Verses of Woe.

== Early life and education ==
DeRoche grew up in Milwaukee, Wisconsin and received a B.A. in English literature from Pomona College in California. He is a graduate of the PBS Producers Academy and is also a Chartered Financial Analyst (CFA).

== Books ==
In 2015, DeRoche published The Ballad of Huck & Miguel, a retelling of Mark Twain's Adventures of Huckleberry Finn set on the Los Angeles River. The Ballad of Huck & Miguel was covered by CBS Sunday Morning, KPCC in Southern California, and the Los Angeles Review of Books.

In 2020, DeRoche published a nonfiction book titled A Fine Line: How Most American Kids Are Kept Out of the Best Public Schools, which analyzes the negative effects of geography-based school assignment in the public schools in the U.S.

DeRoche published Tales of Whimsy, Verses of Woe in 2023. It is a collection of nonsense verse in the style of authors such as Lewis Carroll, Shel Silverstein, and Roald Dahl. The book received a review from Kirkus Reviews, which called it "a rare work of pure, unbridled fun." Publishers Weekly made it an Editor's Pick, calling it "a wacky, fantastical collection of lyrical poems that will entertain children and adults alike." However, School Library Journal described it as "forced, grating, and sophomoric."

== Career ==
In 2002, he worked with Richard Riordan, the former mayor of Los Angeles, and the journalist Matt Welch to start a weekly newspaper called the LA Examiner. The paper never launched.

In 2023, DeRoche established Available to All, a nonprofit organization that focuses on equal access to public schools. The organization lists its partners as 50CAN, Stand Together, and the Foundation for Excellence in Education.

== Personal life ==
DeRoche lives with his wife and three children in Los Angeles.
