= Sada Cumber =

American diplomat

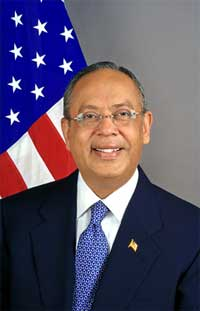

1st United States Ambassador to the Organisation of the Islamic Conference
- In office March 3, 2008 – January 20, 2009
- President: George W. Bush
- Preceded by: Position established
- Succeeded by: Rashad Hussain

Personal details
- Born: December 3, 1951 (age 74) Karachi, Dominion of Pakistan
- Education: University of Karachi (BA, MA)

Sada Cumber or Sada Kunbhar (Sindhi: صدا ڪنڀر) is a Pakistani–American entrepreneur, philanthropist, and diplomat. He is an expert on US foreign policy and national security issues. In 2008, President George W. Bush named him the first U.S. special Envoy to the Organisation of the Islamic Conference, which promotes Muslim solidarity in social and political affairs. In that capacity, Cumber advanced United States interests among the OIC's 57 members nations, including promoting mutual understanding and dialogue while combating intolerance, extremism and the conditions which create it.

== Early history ==
Cumber was born in Karachi, Dominion of Pakistan in 1951 to a Sindhi family. He holds a bachelor's degree in commerce and a master's degree in history, both from the University of Karachi. As a young adult, he worked in his family's photo studio.

Cumber came to the United States in 1978 with his wife, Mumtaz, and has been an American citizen since 1986.

== Business and entrepreneurship ==
Cumber is an entrepreneur and investor. His business background is in senior management, marketing, and imaging technology. As an entrepreneur, Cumber specializes in national and global network strategy, strategic marketing, business planning and institution building.

After briefly residing in New York City, Cumber moved to Miami where he operated a sundries store, a custom mailbox business, and worked nights as a photographer. He acquired a photo lab in Midland, Texas before expanding to Austin, eventually owning seven photo labs in the city.

From small business ownership, Cumber transitioned into entrepreneurship, using his background in photography and photo processing as starting point. Together, Cumber and his wife founded more than a dozen enterprises, predominantly in the tech sector, some of which were acquired by Fortune 500 companies.

== Diplomatic service ==
In 2005 Cumber made his first foray into the diplomatic world as honorary Consul General for the Republic of Malta. He later served two terms as president of the Aga Khan Council for the Southwestern United States.

On March 23, 2008, President George W. Bush named Cumber as special envoy to the Organization of the Islamic Conference, the second-largest intergovernmental organization in the world His responsibilities included improving the dialogue between the United States and the world's 1.6 billion Muslims and enhancing the perception of the United States in the Muslim world. During his term, he traveled to over 40 Muslim countries.

Cumber's accomplishments as special envoy included:

- Playing a central role in persuading the OIC leadership to publicly condemn terrorism and suicide bombing
- Representing the United States in religious freedom and religious rights issues at the United Nations
- Promoting interfaith dialogue as tools for peace with King Abdullah of Saudi Arabia and Pope Benedict XVI
- Working with Secretary of State Condoleezza Rice on issues between Lebanon and Israel
- Securing increased international recognition for the Muslim-majority nation of Kosovo
- Arranging the first-ever visit of OIC leadership to the White House

== Public service and post-state department career ==
After leaving his state Department post, Cumber resumed an active role in public service and philanthropy, both domestically and internationally.

In 2014, he was named to the Texas Higher Education Coordinating Board which oversees all public post-secondary education in the state, including setting policies and efforts to improve higher education., Gov. Rick Perry appointed him to the position.

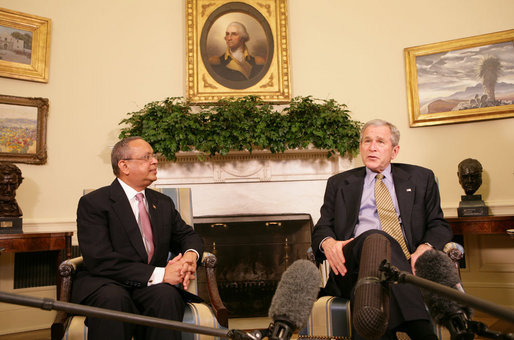
President George W. Bush meets with Sada Cumber, the First U.S. envoy to the Organization of the Islamic Conference Wednesday, February 27, 2008, in the Oval Office.

Cumber has also served on a diverse range of boards, civic/community organizations, advisory councils, and foundations.

- Governor of Texas: Appointee on Texas Economic Development Board ($300 Million fund).
- Governor of Texas: Appointee on Texas Emerging Technology Fund ($200 Million fund).
- Governor of Texas: Member Texas Business Council
- Governor of Texas: Task Force on Higher Education
- Chairman – Texas 5-Year Strategic Plan for International Business
- University Of Texas, Chancellor's Advisory Council: Institute for Public Schools Initiatives
- Board and executive committee: WCIT/2006 – World Congress on Information Technology
- Member, Steering Committee: United Nations 60th Anniversary – Austin, Texas
- University of Texas, College of Fine Arts: Advisory Council
- The Indus Entrepreneurs (TiE)–Advisory board member Houston chapter
- President, His Highness the Aga Khan Council for Southwest USA (two terms)
- Board of Trustees, Photo Marketing Association International
- Board of Trustees, Digital Imaging Marketing Association
- Board of Trustees, Association of Photo CD Users
- Board of directors, Foundation of Religion Studies, Texas
- Life Member, Buck Rogers Group

In 2020, Cumber, along with over 130 other former Republican national security officials, signed a statement that asserted that President Trump was unfit to serve another term, and "To that end, we are firmly convinced that it is in the best interest of our nation that Vice President Joe Biden be elected as the next President of the United States, and we will vote for him."

== Writing ==
In an editorial in The Hill, Cumber argued for the importance of foreign aid in advancing US interests while also suggesting that the Trump Administration's proposed budget cuts could be an opportunity to make needed reforms in the US foreign aid system. Though a Republican, Cumber argued in an op-ed for the Austin American-Statesman that President Trump had undermined American values and eroded confidence in the political process, and said it was time to place the presidency above the president.

== Sufism ==
Cumber attributes his success as a businessman and diplomat to his grounding in Sufism, a mystical form of Islam emphasizing mindfulness of God above ritual and which he credits for giving him a spiritual direction emphasizing peace, tolerance, and pluralism. Cumber was first exposed to Sufi philosophy as a boy in Karachi through listening to Ginans and Qawwali music.

Cumber named his daughter Rabia in honor of Rabia Basri, the Arab Muslim saint and Sufi mystic, who believed that for one who truly loved God, that love alone should be enough without the promise of heaven or the threat of Hell.

== Personal life ==
Cumber lives in Sugar Land, Texas, a suburb south of Houston, with his wife Mumtaz.
