= Super 30 =

Indian educational programme started in Patna, India

- Super 30 class of 2006
- Patna, Bihar; India

Information
- Type: Institute
- Established: 2002 (24 years ago)
- Founder: Anand Kumar; Abhayanand
- Principal: Anand Kumar
- Enrollment: 30 students
- Campus type: Education
- Team name: Super 30
- Website: www.super30.org

Super 30 is an Indian educational programme started in Patna, India under the banner of Ramanujan School of Mathematics. It was founded by Anand Kumar, a mathematics teacher. The programme selects 30 talented candidates each year from economically underprivileged sections of Indian society and trains them for the JEE. The programme is portrayed in the 2019 film, Super 30, starring Hrithik Roshan as Anand Kumar, and his school, have been the subject of several smear campaigns, some of which have been carried in Indian media sources.

== History ==
In 2002, Anand Kumar and Abhayanand started Super 30 with the plan to select 30 talented students from economically impoverished sections who could not afford IIT coaching. These 30 students were then prepared to pass IIT-JEE examinations. Anand Kumar's mother, Jayanti Devi, volunteered to cook for the students while Anand Kumar, Abhayanand, and other teachers tutored them. The students were also provided study materials and lodging for a year free of cost.

In the first year of the coaching, 18 out of 30 students made it to IIT. The following year, application numbers soared due to the popularity of the program and written examination was conducted to select 30 students. In 2004, 22 out of 30 students qualified for IIT-JEE, increasing the popularity of the program which attracted even more applications.

In 2005, 26 out of 30 students cleared the IIT-JEE exam, while 28 in 2006 - this despite the fact that IIT changed the examination structure. In appreciation of their efforts, Bihar Chief Minister at the time Nitish Kumar congratulated the students with a cash prize of ₹50,000 each.

The following year 28 more students cleared the IIT-JEE, and in 2008, all of the Super 30 students cleared the IIT-JEE, after which Abhayanand quit Super 30 saying "the experiment is over." Some of Kumar's former students joined as Super 30 teachers and in 2009 and 2010 all 30 students again qualified the IIT JEE exams. In subsequent years the success rates from the 30 students were: 2011 (24 passed), 2012 (27 passed), 2013 (28 passed), 2014 (27 passed), 2015 (25 passed), and in 2016 (28 passed). In 2017, all Super 30 candidates made it to the IIT-JEE. In 2018, 26 of the 30 students cleared the exam.

Year	Qualified
2003	18/30
2004	22/30
2005	26/30
2006	28/30
2007	28/30
2008	30/30
2009	30/30
2010	30/30
2011	24/30
2012	27/30
2013	28/30
2014	27/30
2015	25/30
2016	28/30
2017	30/30
2018	26/30

== Awards and recognition ==
Time Magazine included Super 30 in its list of The Best of Asia 2010. The organization also received praise from US President Barack Obama's special envoy Rashad Hussain, who termed it the "best" institute in the country. Newsweek Magazine included Super 30 in its list of Four Most Innovative Schools in the World. Anand Kumar was awarded the Maulana Abul Kalam Azad Shiksha Puraskar in November 2010, the highest award given by the Bihar state government in the field of education.

== Smear campaigns ==
On 23 July 2018, an article in Dainik Jagran cited former Super 30 students who said that only three students from the program had passed the IIT JEE exam that year, contrary to Kumar's claim that 26 had passed. The report also claimed that students who sought to enroll in Super 30 were pushed to enroll in another coaching center called Ramanujan Institute of Mathematics, a for-profit coaching institute, on the pretext that Kumar would coach them if they performed well. Furthermore, the article alleged that by asking IIT aspirants to enroll in Ramanujan Institute, Kumar made over ₹1 crore annually.

Former Deputy Chief Minister of Bihar and Current Leader of the Opposition in the Bihar Assembly Tejashwi Yadav spoke in favor of Anand Kumar and said that "propaganda is being run in media influenced by feudal mindset to discredit and defame Anand Kumar." Former Union Cabinet Minister Shatrughan Sinha has also spoken in Kumar's favor on Twitter. In August 2018, The Hindu reported that Kumar and his school are frequently the focus of faked smear campaigns, and identified the potential sources of the fabricated stories that appeared in the Dainik Jagran newspaper in July.

== In popular culture ==
- A 60-minute film digibeta on Super 30, directed by Christopher Mitchell, was screened at the Indian Film Festival of Los Angeles (IFFLA), it was an instant hit in the US. The Discovery Channel also showed this film on Super 30 in March 2009.
- A video series on Super 30 was broadcast in the popular Canadian TV series Witness.
- Time Magazine has selected mathematician Anand Kumar's school - Super 30 - in the list of Best of Asia 2010. (14 May 2010)

=== Film ===
Bollywood director Vikas Bahl cast Hrithik Roshan for his film Super 30, which is based on the life and works of Anand Kumar. It theatrically released in India on 12 July 2019 to positive reviews.

== See also ==
- Rahmani30
