= Anand Kumar =

Indian mathematician and educationalist

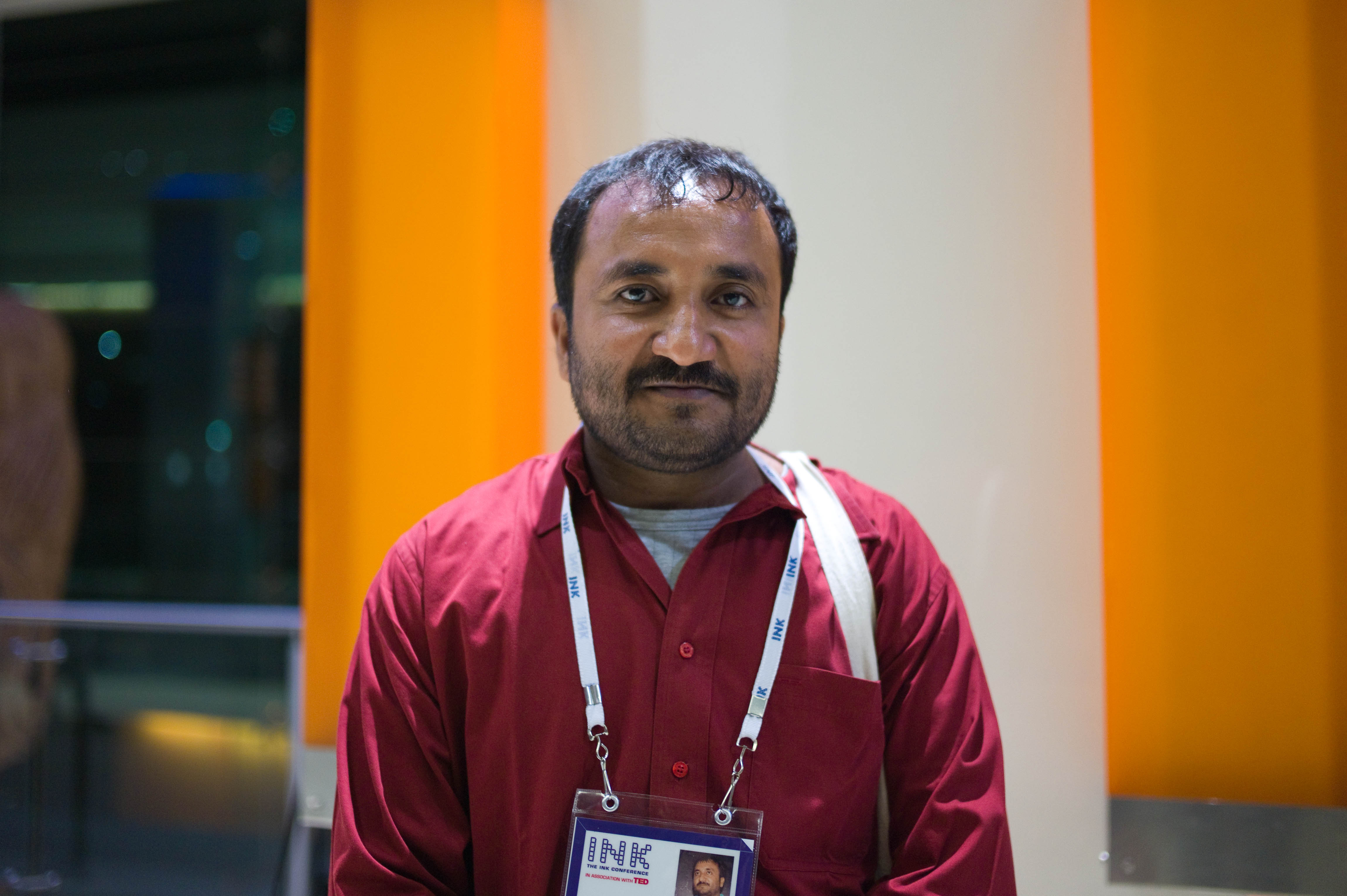
- Anand Kumar in 2010
- Born: 1 January 1973 (age 53); Patna, Bihar, India
- Education: Bihar National College; Patna University
- Occupation: Mathematics teacher
- Years active: 2002–Present
- Known for: Super 30 Program
- Spouse: Ritu Rashmi
- Children: 2
- Parents: Jayanti Devi (mother); Rajendra Prasad (father)
- Awards: Padma Shri (2023); Maulana Abul Kalam Azad Shiksha Puraskar (2010)
- Website: Super 30; Super Infinity

Anand Kumar (born 1 January 1973) is an Indian mathematics educator, best known for his Super 30 program, which he started in Patna, Bihar in 2002. He is known for coaching underprivileged students for JEE–Main and JEE–Advanced, the entrance examinations for the Indian Institutes of Technology (IITs). Kumar was named in Time magazine's list of Best of Asia 2010. In 2023, he was awarded the Padma Shri, the country's fourth highest civilian award by the Government of India for his contributions in the fields of literature and education.

By 2018, 422 out of 510 students had made it to the IITs and Discovery Channel showcased his work in a documentary. His life and work had been portrayed in the 2019 film, Super 30, where he was played by Hrithik Roshan.

== Early life ==
Anand Kumar was born in Bihar, India. His father was a clerk in the postal department of India. His father could not afford private schooling for his children, and Anand attended a Hindi medium government school, where he developed his deep interest in mathematics. He studied at Patna High School, in Patna, Bihar. During his graduation, Kumar submitted papers on number theory, which were published in the Mathematical Spectrum. Kumar secured admission to the University of Cambridge, which he could not attend because of his father's death and his financial condition.

== Teaching career ==
In 1992, Kumar began teaching mathematics. He rented a classroom for Rs. 300 per month, and began his own institute, the Ramanujan School of Mathematics (RSM). Within the span of year, his class grew from two students to thirty-six, and after three years almost 500 students had enrolled. Then in early 2000, when a poor student came to him seeking coaching for IIT-JEE, who could not afford the annual admission fee due to poverty, Kumar was motivated to start the Super 30 programme in 2002, for which he is now well-known.

Since 2002, every May, the Ramanujan School of Mathematics holds a competitive test to select 30 students for the Super 30 program. Many students take the test, and eventually, thirty intelligent students from economically disadvantaged sections are selected. He tutors them, and provides study materials and lodging for a year. He prepares them for the Joint Entrance Examination for the Indian Institutes of Technology (IIT). His mother, Jayanti Devi, cooks for the students, and his brother Pranav Kumar takes care of the management.

During 2003 to 2017, 391 students out of 450 passed the IITs. In 2010, all the students of Super 30 cleared IIT JEE entrance making it a three in a row for the institution. Anand Kumar has no financial support for Super 30 from any government as well as private agencies, and manages on the tuition fee he earns from the Ramanujan Institute. After the success of Super 30 and its growing popularity, he received offers from the private sector – both national and international companies – as well as the government for financial help, but he has refused it; Kumar wanted to sustain Super 30 through his own efforts.

From 2006 to 2010, 30 out of 30 students cleared the IIT-JEE. In subsequent years, the pass rates for the 30 students at the IIT-JEE examinations were: 2011 – 24, 2012–27, 2013–28, 2014–27, 2015–25, 2016–28, 2017–30, and 2018–26.

== Super Infinity ==
In 2026, Kumar launched Super Infinity, a digital education initiative intended to make mathematics education more accessible through online learning. The initiative was formally launched in New Delhi in May 2026, with its online educational programme beginning in June.

The platform offers free online classes, initially focusing on mathematics at the school level and higher levels, with courses intended for different categories of learners and for examinations and competitive examinations. The classes are made available through the Super Infinity YouTube channel and its website.

Kumar has said that Super Infinity uses animation, storytelling and music-based learning techniques to explain mathematical concepts and make learning more engaging. The initiative also includes plans for inspirational films and motivational content aimed at learners.

The initiative was conceived as a digital extension of Kumar's educational work through Super 30, with the stated aim of using digital technology to reach a larger number of learners beyond the geographical limitations of the original programme. The first Super Infinity online class was released in June 2026 and focused on natural numbers. The Telegraph reported in July 2026 that the class had received about 2.5 million views.

== Personal life ==
In 2019, Kumar revealed that he has been suffering from acoustic neuroma, a rare kind of brain tumor, and has lost 80-90% of the hearing in his right ear due to it. He is under treatment of noted neurosurgeon B. K. Misra at the Hinduja Hospital in Mumbai.

== Recognition ==
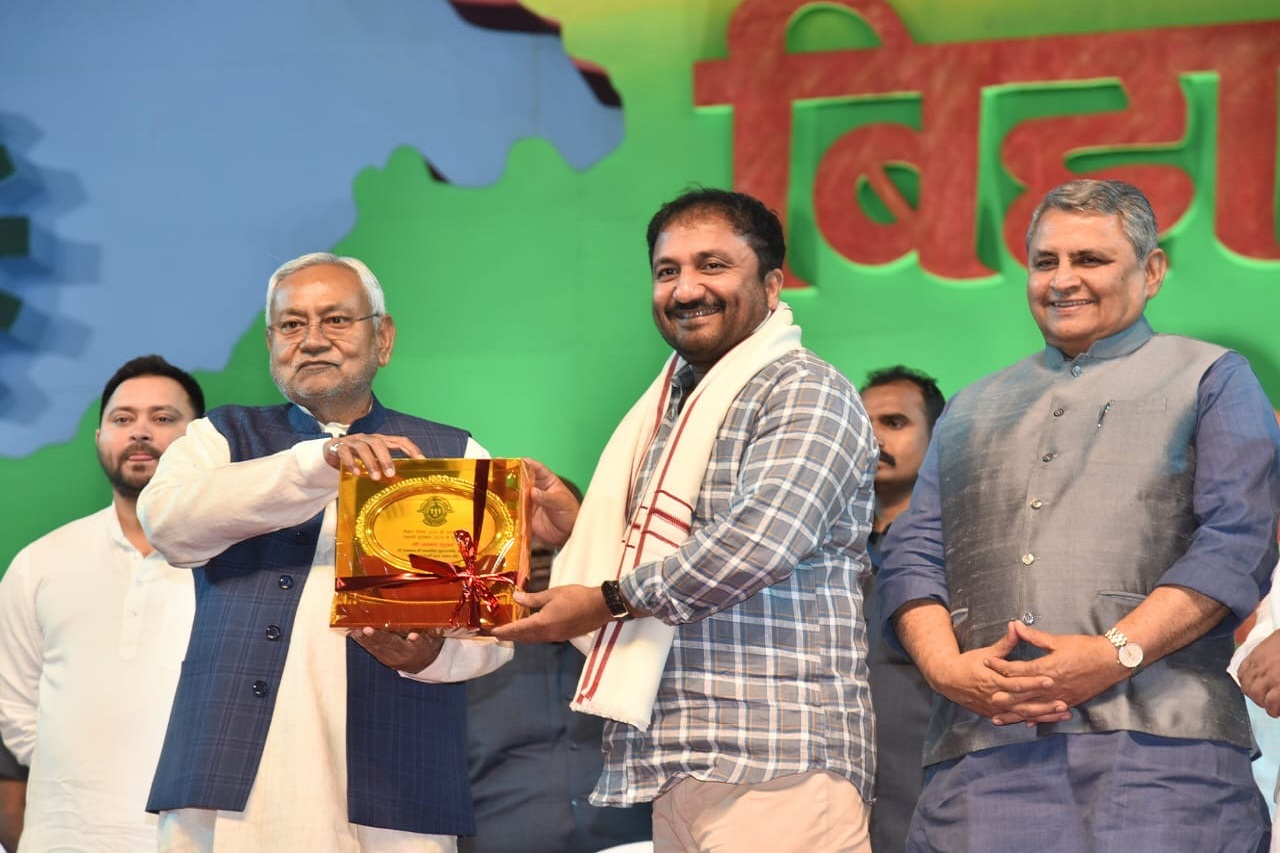
Kumar with Bihar Chief Minister Nitish Kumar in 2023.

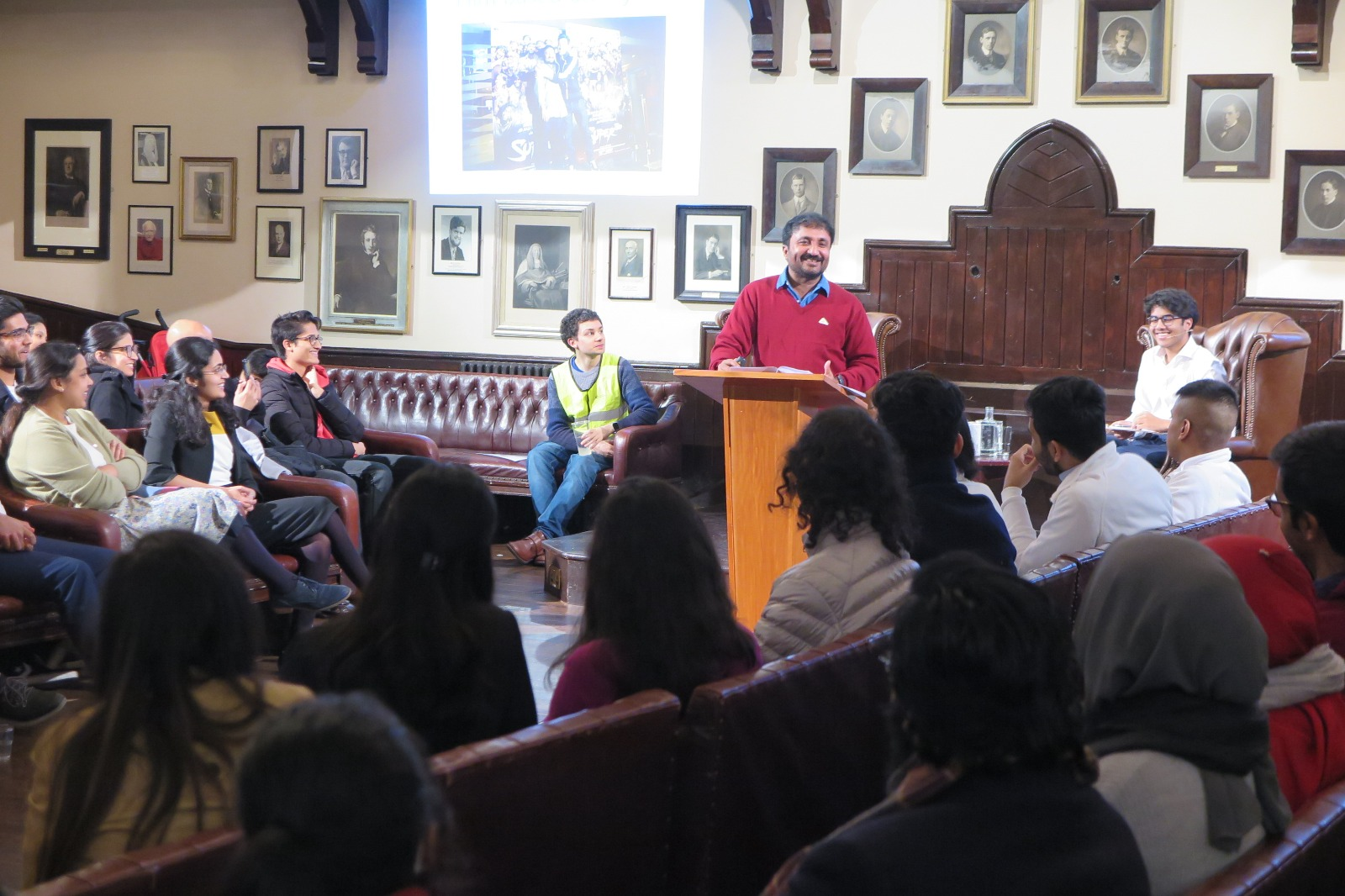
Kumar speaking at Cambridge University

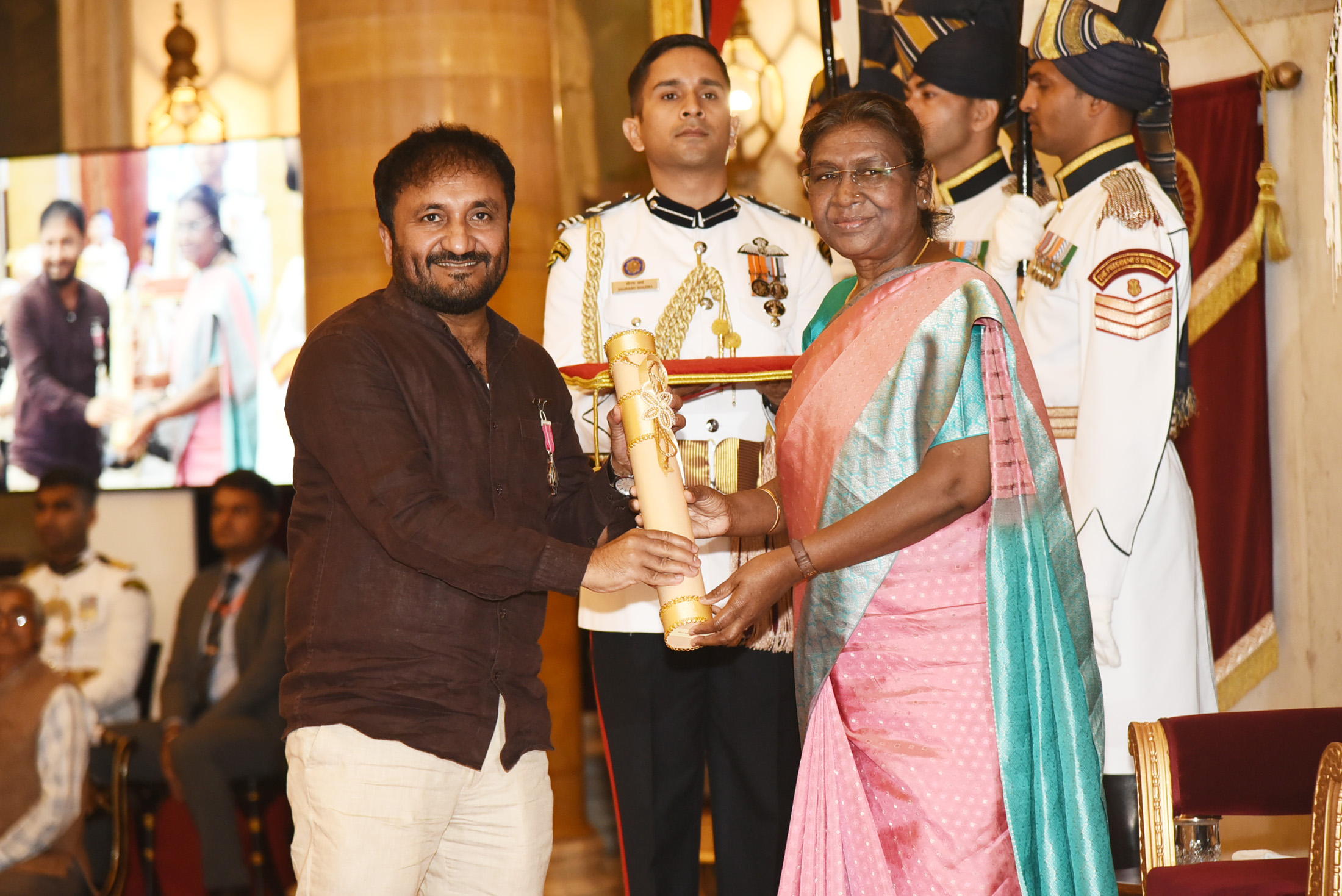
Kumar receiving the Padma Shri Award from President Droupadi Murmu

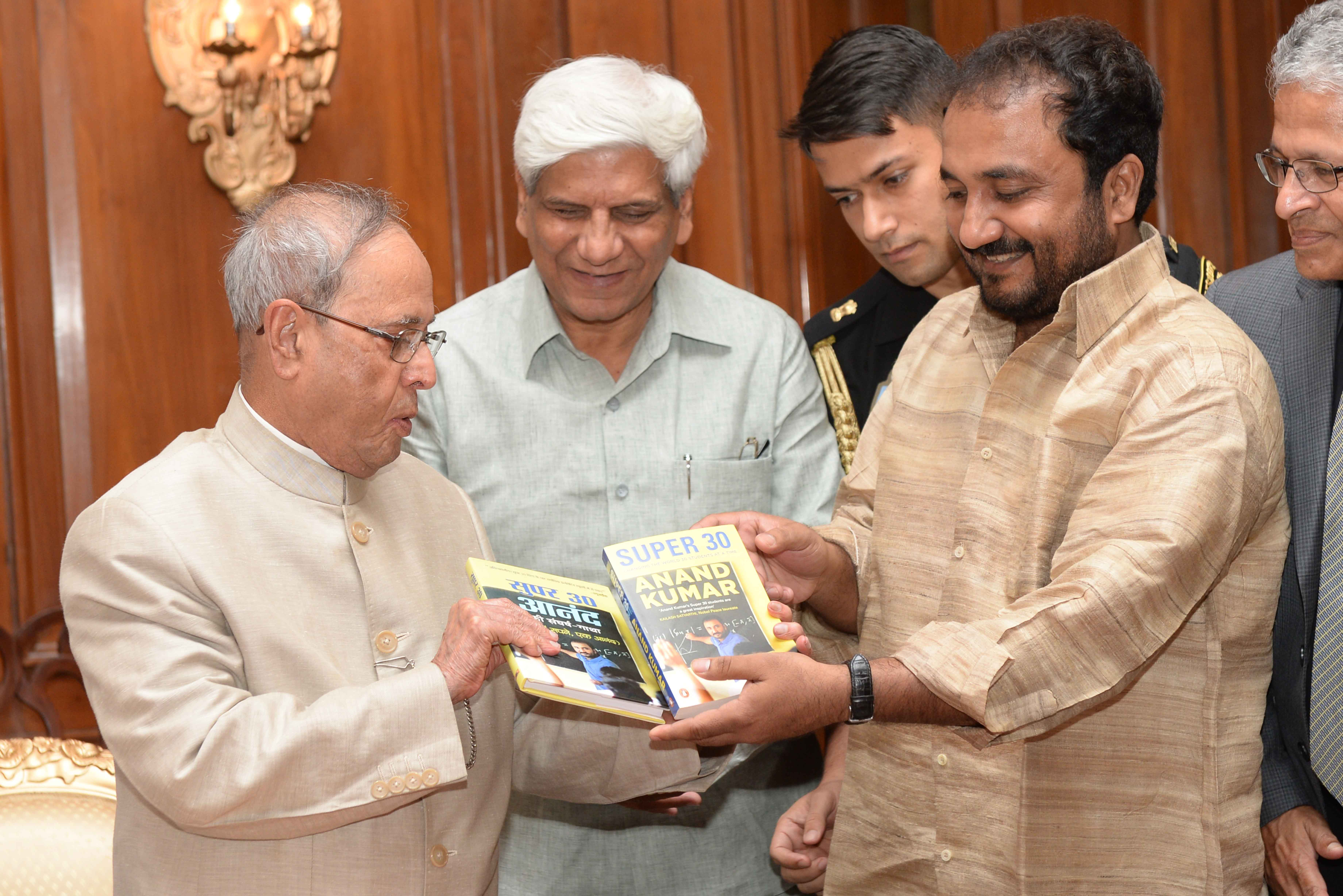
President Pranab Mukherjee being given a book about Super 30.

In March 2009, Discovery Channel broadcast a one-hour-long programme on Super 30, and half a page was devoted to Kumar in The New York Times. Actress and former Miss Japan Norika Fujiwara visited Patna to make a documentary on Kumar's initiatives. Kumar has been featured in programmes by the BBC. He has spoken about his experiences at various global-level institutes including Indian Institute of Management Ahmedabad, a number of IITs, University of British Columbia, Tokyo University and Stanford University. He was also inducted in the Limca Book of Records (2009) for his contribution in helping poor students pass the IIT-JEE by providing them free coaching. Time magazine included Super 30 in the list of Best of Asia 2010.

Super 30 received praise from United States President Barack Obama's special envoy, Rashad Hussain, who termed it the "best" institute in the country. Newsweek Magazine has taken note of the initiative of mathematician Anand Kumar's Super 30 and included his school in the list of four most innovative schools in the world. Kumar was given the top award of Bihar government, "Maulana Abdul Kalam Azad Shiksha Puraskar", in November 2010. He was awarded the Prof. Yashwantrao Kelkar Yuva Puraskar award in 2010 by Akhil Bharatiya Vidyarthi Parishad (ABVP) in Bangalore.

In April 2011, Kumar was selected by Europe's magazine Focus as "one of the global personalities who have the ability to shape exceptionally talented people." Kumar also helped Amitabh Bachchan in preparing for his role in the film Aarakshan. Many people from Bollywood including renowned directors and producers are interested in making a movie on the life of Anand Kumar. He was named by UK based magazine Monocle among the list of 20 pioneering teachers of the world. He was also honoured by government of British Columbia, Canada. Kumar was given the Baroda Sun Life Achievement Award by Bank of Baroda in Mumbai. Kumar was conferred with the Ramanujan Mathematics Award at the Eighth National Mathematics Convention at function in Rajkot. He was conferred with an Honorary Doctorate of Science (DSc) by Karpagam University, Coimbatore. He was also awarded Maharishi Ved Vyas national award by Madhya Pradesh Government for extraordinary contribution in education. Anand Kumar was honored by ministry of education of Saxony of Germany.

Kumar presented his biography to then-President of India, Pranab Mukherjee, which was written by Canada-based psychiatrist Biju Mathew. Kumar was awarded "Rashtriya Bal Kalyan Award" by president of India Ram Nath Kovind. A Canadian MP Marc Dalton has praised Anand Kumar's "inspiring work" with underprivileged children as a successful model for education in Canadian parliament. Anand Kumar was conferred an honorary PhD by the National Institute of Technology, Delhi.

== Awards ==
In 2010, the Government of Bihar honored Anand Kumar with the Maulana Abul Kalam Azad Shiksha Puraskar, the state’s highest award in the field of education.

In 2018, Anand Kumar was awarded Mahaveer Awards in Chennai for excellence in human endeavour in the field of Education, presented by Bhagwan Mahaveer Foundation.

On 8 November 2018, Anand Kumar was honoured with the Global Education Award 2018 by Malabar Gold & Diamonds in Dubai. His efforts in the field of education are considered "pioneering".

Anand Kumar has been felicitated in the US with "Education Excellence Award 2019" by the Foundation For Excellence in Education (FFE) at a function in San Jose, California. Anand Kumar recently awarded with Bharat Ganit Ratna Award 2022- a special award declared by DASA India - National VO operated from Agartala Tripura on 10 March 2022, which has been handed over by Anjan Banik, National Chairman of DASA India.

In 2023, he was awarded the Padma Shri by the Government of India for his contributions in the field of literature and education.

== In popular culture ==
Bollywood director Vikas Bahl has directed a film titled Super 30, with Hrithik Roshan as Anand Kumar, based on his life and works. The movie was successful at the box office.

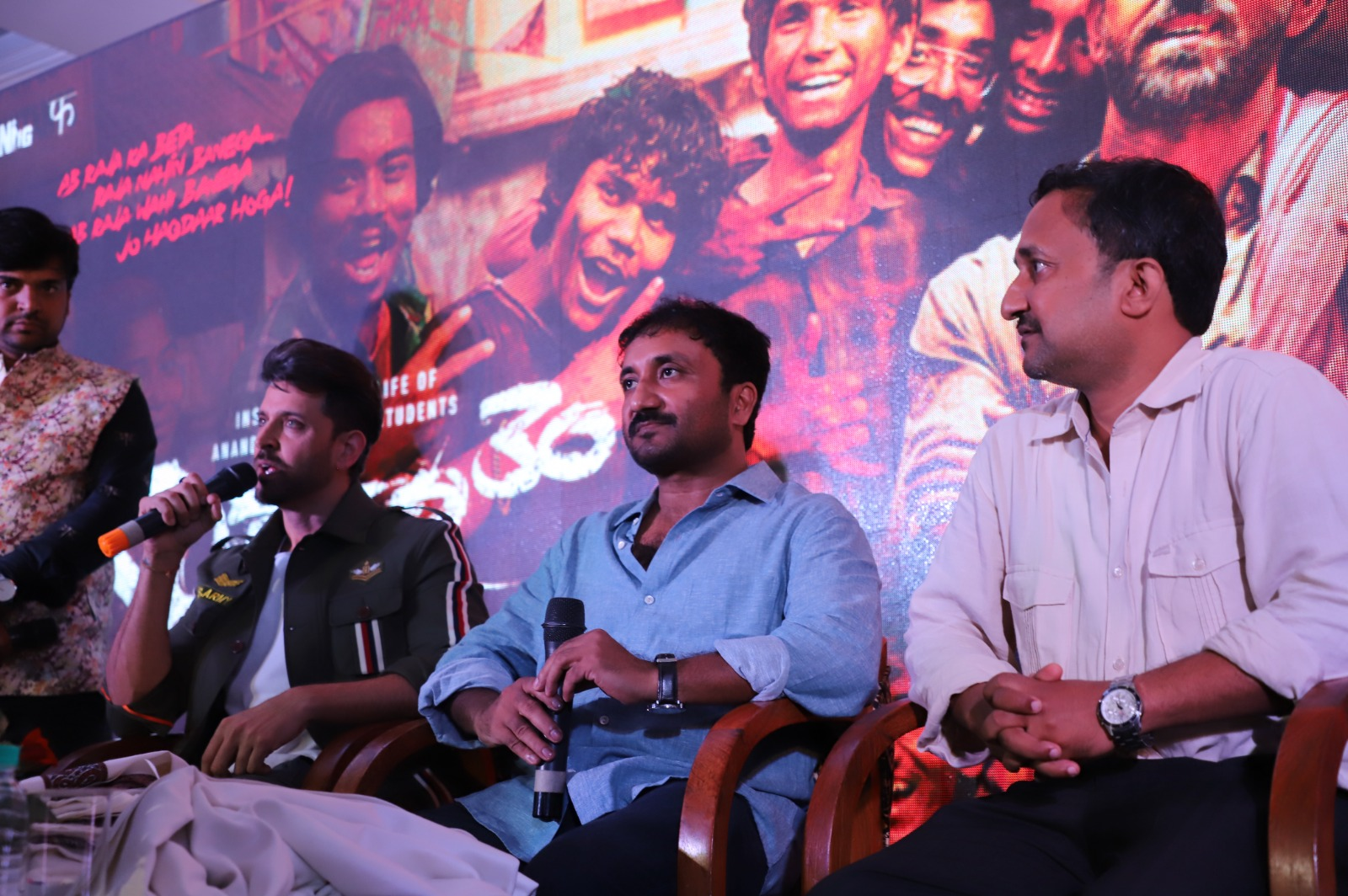
Anand Kumar at the premiere of biopic on his life ‘Super 30’ in 2019

== Accusations ==
On 23 July 2018, an article in Dainik Jagran cited former Super 30 students who said that only three students from the program had passed the IIT JEE exam that year, contrary to Kumar's claim that 26 had passed. The report also claimed that students who sought to enroll in Super 30 were pushed to enroll in another coaching center called Ramanujan Classes, a for-profit institution, on the pretext that Kumar would coach them if they performed well. Furthermore, the article alleged that by asking IIT aspirants to enroll in Ramanujan Classes, Kumar made over Rs 1 crore annually.

Deputy Chief Minister of Bihar Tejashwi Yadav said that "propaganda is being run in media influenced by feudal mindset to discredit and defame Anand Kumar." Union Cabinet Minister Shatrughan Sinha also supported Kumar on Twitter. In August 2018, The Hindusaid that Kumar and his school are frequently the target of smear campaigns, and identified the potential sources of the stories in question that appeared in the Dainik Jagran newspaper in July. Dainik Jagran later awarded its ‘Editor’s Choice Award’ to Anand Kumar in 2021 for his work in education.
