= Hrithik Roshan =

Indian actor and film producer (born 1974)

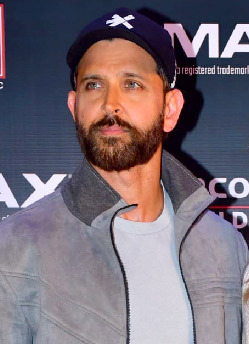
- Roshan in 2024
- Born: Hritik Rakesh Nagrath; 10 January 1974 (age 52); Bombay, Maharashtra, India
- Education: Sydenham College (B.Com)
- Occupations: Actor; film producer
- Years active: 1980–1986 (as child actor); 2000–present (actor, producer)
- Works: Full list
- Spouse: Sussanne Khan (m. 2000; div. 2014)
- Partner: Saba Azad (2022–present)
- Children: 2
- Father: Rakesh Roshan
- Family: Roshan family
- Awards: Full list

Hritik Rakesh Nagrath (born 10 January 1974), known professionally as Hrithik Roshan (Hindi: [ˈɾɪt̪ɪk ɾoːʃən]), is an Indian actor and producer who works in Hindi cinema. Referred to as the millennial superstar, he has portrayed a variety of characters and is known for his dancing skills. One of the highest-paid actors in India, he has won many awards, including six Filmfare Awards, of which four were for Best Actor. Starting from 2012, he has appeared in Forbes India's Celebrity 100 several times based on his income and popularity.

Roshan has frequently collaborated with his father, Rakesh Roshan. He made brief appearances as a child actor in several films in the 1980s and later worked as an assistant director on four of his father's films. His first leading role was in the box-office success Kaho Naa... Pyaar Hai (2000), for which he received several awards. Performances in the 2000 terrorism drama Fiza and the 2001 ensemble family drama Kabhi Khushi Kabhie Gham consolidated his reputation but were followed by several poorly received films.

The 2003 science fiction film Koi... Mil Gaya, for which Roshan won two Filmfare Awards, was a turning point in his film career; he later starred as the titular superhero in its sequels: Krrish (2006) and Krrish 3 (2013). He earned praise for his portrayal of an army officer in Lakshya (2004), a thief in Dhoom 2 (2006), Mughal emperor Akbar in Jodhaa Akbar (2008) and a quadriplegic in Guzaarish (2010). He achieved further commercial success with the comedy-drama Zindagi Na Milegi Dobara (2011), the revenge drama Agneepath (2012), the biopic Super 30 (2019), and action films directed by Siddharth Anand—Bang Bang! (2014), War (2019), and Fighter (2024).

Roshan has also performed on stage and debuted on television with the dance reality show Just Dance (2011). As a judge on the latter, he became the highest-paid film star on Indian television at that time. He is involved with several humanitarian causes, endorses several brands and products, and has launched his own clothing line. Roshan was married for fourteen years to Sussanne Khan, with whom he has two children.

== Early life and background ==
Roshan was born as Hritik Rakesh Nagrath on 10 January 1974 in Bombay, in Maharashtra, India into the Roshan family, prominent in Hindi cinema. Roshan is of Punjabi and Bengali descent. Hrithik's paternal grandmother, Ira Nagrath (née Moitra) was a Bengali Brahmin from Kolkata and a singer by profession, while his paternal grandfather, Roshanlal Nagrath was from Gujranwala and a music director by profession. Hritik's father is a film director, Rakesh Roshan; while his mother, Pinkie, is the daughter of producer and director, J. Om Prakash. His maternal grandmother was the sister-in-law of director, Mohan Kumar, himself the uncle of model-turned-actor, Deepak Parashar. His uncle, Rajesh Roshan, is a music composer whose daughter, Pashmina Roshan, is an actress.

Roshan is informally referred to as Duggu, a nickname given by his grandmother Ira, who reversed his father Rakesh's nickname Guddu. Roshan has an older sister, Sunaina, and was educated at the Bombay Scottish School in Mahim. Roshan belongs to a Hindu family, though he considers himself more spiritual than religious.

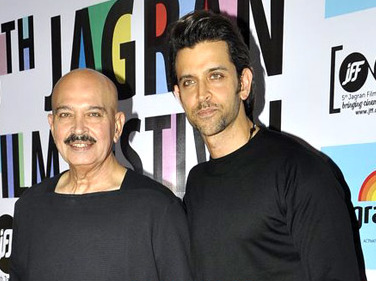
Roshan pictured with father Rakesh at the Jagran Film Festival in 2014

Roshan felt isolated as a child; he was born with an extra thumb fused to the one on his right hand, which led some of his peers to avoid him. He has stammered since the age of six; this caused him problems at school, and he feigned injury and illness to avoid oral tests. He was helped by daily speech therapy. His father has said that Roshan would lock himself up in the bathroom to pronounce sentences fluently.

Roshan's grandfather, Prakash first brought him on-screen at the age of six in the film Aasha (1980); he danced in a song enacted by Jeetendra, for which Prakash paid him ₹100. Roshan made uncredited appearances in various family film projects, including his father's production Aap Ke Deewane (1980). In Prakash's Aas Paas (1981), he appeared in the song "Shehar Main Charcha Hai". The actor's only speaking role during this period came when he was 12; he was seen as Govinda, the title character's adopted son, in Prakash's Bhagwaan Dada (1986). Roshan decided that he wanted to be a full-time actor, but his father insisted that he focus on his studies. In his early 20s, he was diagnosed with scoliosis that would not allow him to dance or perform stunts. Initially devastated, he eventually decided to become an actor anyway. Around a year after the diagnosis, he took a chance by jogging on a beach when he was caught in a downpour. There was no pain, and becoming more confident, he was able to increase his pace with no adverse effects. Roshan sees this day as "the turning point of [his] life."

Roshan attended the Sydenham College of Commerce and Economics of Dr. Homi Bhabha State University in Churchgate, graduating with a Bachelor of Commerce degree, where he also took part in dance and music festivals while studying. Roshan assisted his father on four films—Khudgarz (1987), King Uncle (1993) (credited as Hritik Roshan), Karan Arjun (1995) and Koyla (1997)—while also sweeping the floor and making tea for the crew. After pack-up, Roshan would enact Shah Rukh Khan's scenes from Koyla and film himself to make a judgement about his performance as an actor. While he assisted his father, he studied acting under Kishore Namit Kapoor.

== Film career ==
=== 2000–2002: Breakthrough and setback ===
Roshan was originally scheduled to make his screen debut as a lead actor opposite Preity Zinta in a cancelled film – Shekhar Kapur's Tara Rum Pum Pum. Instead, he starred in his father's romantic drama Kaho Naa... Pyaar Hai (2000) opposite another debutante, Ameesha Patel. Roshan played dual roles: Rohit, an aspiring singer brutally killed after witnessing a murder, and Raj, an NRI who falls in love with Patel's character. To prepare, he trained with the actor Salman Khan to bulk up physically, worked to improve his diction and took lessons in acting, singing, dancing, fencing and riding. With global revenues of ₹800 million (US$8.5 million), Kaho Naa... Pyaar Hai became one of the highest-grossing Indian films of 2000. His performance was acclaimed by critics; Suggu Kanchana on Rediff.com wrote, "[Roshan] is good. The ease and style with which he dances, emotes, fights, makes one forget this is his debut film ... He seems to be the most promising among the recent lot of star sons we have been subjected to." For the role, Roshan received Best Male Debut and Best Actor Awards at the annual Filmfare Awards, IIFA Awards, and Zee Cine Awards. He became the only actor to win both Filmfare Best Debut and Best Actor and IIFA Best Debut and Best Actor awards for the same film. The film cemented Roshan's status as a leading actor in Bollywood, propelling him to superstardom. The actor found life hard after his overnight success, particularly the demands on his time.

In his second release, Khalid Mohammed's crime drama Fiza, Roshan played Amaan, an innocent Muslim boy who becomes a terrorist after the 1992–93 Bombay riots. Roshan took on the role to explore new dimensions of his acting. Co-starring Karisma Kapoor and Jaya Bachchan, Fiza was moderately successful at the box office, and Roshan's performance earned him a second nomination for Best Actor at the Filmfare ceremony. Taran Adarsh of Bollywood Hungama praised him as the production's prime asset, commending his "body language, his diction, his expressions, [and] his overall persona." Roshan next appeared in Vidhu Vinod Chopra's action drama Mission Kashmir (2000) alongside Sanjay Dutt, Preity Zinta, and Jackie Shroff. Set in the valley of Kashmir during the Indo-Pakistani conflicts, the film addressed the topics of terrorism and crime, and was a financial success. Roshan was drawn to his complex role of a young man traumatised by the discovery that his adoptive father had been responsible for the death of his entire birth family. In Adarsh's opinion, Roshan "brightens up the screen with his magnetic presence. His body language, coupled with his expressions, is sure to win him plaudits."

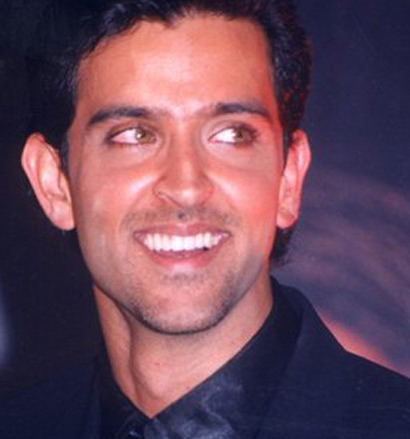
Roshan at an event for Kabhi Khushi Kabhie Gham (2001)—his biggest commercial success to that point

In 2001, Roshan appeared in two films, the first of which was Subhash Ghai's Yaadein, a romantic drama which paired him with Kareena Kapoor and reunited him with Shroff. Although highly anticipated, Yaadein was reviled by critics; in The Hindu, Ziya Us Salam criticised the director for relying on Roshan's commercial appeal. Roshan next had a supporting role in Karan Johar's ensemble melodrama Kabhi Khushi Kabhie Gham alongside Amitabh Bachchan, Jaya Bachchan, Shah Rukh Khan, Kajol and Kareena Kapoor. He was cast as Rohan Raichand—the younger son of Bachchan's character who plots to reunite him with his adopted son (played by Khan)—after Johar had watched a rough cut of Kaho Naa... Pyaar Hai. Kabhi Khushi Kabhie Gham finished as India's highest-grossing film of the year, and among the most successful Bollywood films in the overseas market, earning ₹1.36 billion (US$15 million) worldwide. Writing for Rediff.com, Anjum N described Roshan as "the surprise scene-stealer", praising him for holding his own against the established actors. Roshan received a nomination for the Filmfare Award for Best Supporting Actor for his performance.

In 2002 Vikram Bhatt's romance Aap Mujhe Achche Lagne Lage reunited him with Ameesha Patel but failed at the box office, as did Arjun Sablok's romance Na Tum Jaano Na Hum (2002), in which he co-starred with Saif Ali Khan and Esha Deol. Roshan's final role that year was in a Yash Raj Films production, the high-profile Mujhse Dosti Karoge! co-starring Rani Mukerji and Kareena Kapoor. The romantic comedy was heavily promoted before its release and made money internationally, though not in India. In another commercial failure, Sooraj R. Barjatya's Main Prem Ki Diwani Hoon, Roshan was cast alongside Kareena Kapoor for the fourth time, and Abhishek Bachchan. The press labelled Roshan a "one-trick pony" and suggested that the failure of these films would end his career.

=== 2003–2007: Revival and widespread success ===
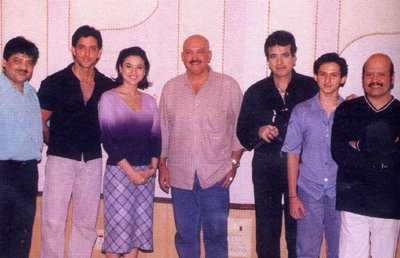
Roshan (second from left) at the launch of Koi... Mil Gaya (2003)

Roshan's career began to revive with a starring role in Koi... Mil Gaya (2003). The film, directed and produced by his father, centers on his character Rohit Mehra, a developmentally disabled young man, who comes in contact with an extraterrestrial being—a role that required him to lose nearly 8 kilograms (18 lb). Roshan recalls the experience of starring in the film fondly: "I could live my childhood [again]. I could eat as many chocolates as I wanted. I became a baby, and everybody was so caring towards me." In the book Film Sequels, Carolyn Jess-Cooke drew similarities between the character and Forrest Gump, portrayed by Tom Hanks in the titular film, but this idea was dismissed by Roshan. Film critics were polarised on their view of the film—some of them negatively compared its storyline to the 1982 Hollywood release E.T. the Extra-Terrestrial—but were unanimous in their praise for Roshan. In a 2010 retrospective of the Top 80 Iconic Performances of Bollywood, Filmfare noted "how flesh and blood Hrithik's act is. Simply because he believes he is the part. Watch him laugh, cry, or bond with his remote-controlled alien friend and note his nuanced turn." A Rediff.com critic agreed that Roshan was "the turbojet that propels the film to the realm of the extraordinary." Koi... Mil Gaya was one of the most popular Bollywood films of the year, earning ₹823.3 million (US$8.8 million) worldwide and Roshan won both Filmfare Awards for Best Actor and Best Actor (Critics).

"I am glad I have the intelligence to understand what is happening to me. If I allow myself to get affected by all this hype, I'll stunt my growth as an actor and be damned for life. I know that I still have a long way to go before I can even aspire to equal the achievements of any of the superstars. I know I am good at my job, and I am sure I will be damn good one day, but right now, I also know how bad I can be."

— Roshan on his position as a popular Bollywood actor

The following year, Roshan collaborated with Amitabh Bachchan and Preity Zinta on Farhan Akhtar's Lakshya (2004), a fictionalised coming-of-age story set against events from the 1999 Kargil War. He also featured in the item number "Main Aisa Kyun Hoon" (choreographed by Prabhu Deva), which proved popular with audiences. Roshan found it "one of the most challenging films" of his career at the time and said it made him respect soldiers. Although trade journalists expected the film to do well commercially, it failed to attract a wide audience. However, over the years, it has attained a cult status. For the film, Roshan earned Best Actor nominations at the Filmfare and Zee Cine ceremony. Manish Gajjar of the BBC praised Roshan's versatility and his transformation from a carefree youth to a determined and courageous soldier. Reviewing the film in 2016, Tatsam Mukherjee of India Today described his performance as a career-best, highlighting his scene before the climax.

Roshan was not seen on screen again until 2006, with three new releases, including a cameo at the end of the year in the romance I See You. He co-starred with Naseeruddin Shah and Priyanka Chopra in his father's superhero production Krrish. A follow-up to his family's production Koi... Mil Gaya, it saw him play dual roles—the title superhero and his character from the original film. Before production, Roshan travelled to China to train with Tony Ching for the cable work that would be needed to make his character fly. Among the several injuries he sustained during production, Roshan tore the hamstring in his right leg and broke his thumb and toe. Krrish became the third-highest-grossing Bollywood film of 2006 with a worldwide revenue of ₹1.26 billion (US$13 million). It garnered him Best Actor awards at the 2007 Screen and the International Indian Film Academy Awards. Ronnie Scheib of Variety considered Roshan a prime asset of the film, noting that he "pulls off the pic's wilder absurdities with considerable panache."

For his role as an enigmatic master thief in Dhoom 2 (2006)—an action sequel co-starring Aishwarya Rai, Bipasha Basu and Abhishek Bachchan—Roshan won his third Filmfare Award for Best Actor. The film critic Rajeev Masand called him "the heart, the soul, and the spirit of the film", and praised his stunts, concluding that he "holds the film together and even manages to take your attention away from its many flaws". Bored by playing the "good guy", Roshan was excited to play an anti-hero who lacks heroic attributes, for the first time. At the request of the film's producer Aditya Chopra, Roshan lost 12 pounds (5.4 kg) for the role; he also learnt skateboarding, snow boarding, rollerblading and sand surfing. With earnings of ₹1.5 billion (US$16 million), Dhoom 2 became the highest-grossing Indian film at that time, a distinction that was held for two years. In the 2007 melodrama Om Shanti Om, he made a cameo alongside several Bollywood stars.

=== 2008–2012: Diversification and acclaim ===
In 2008, Roshan was cast in Ashutosh Gowariker's Jodhaa Akbar, a partly fictionalised account of a marriage of convenience between the Mughal emperor Akbar (played by Roshan) and Hindu princess Jodha Bai (played by Rai). Gowariker believed Roshan possessed the regal bearing and physique required to play the role of a king. For the role, Roshan learned sword-fighting and horse-riding, and also took Urdu lessons. Jodhaa Akbar earned ₹1.2 billion (US$13 million) worldwide. Roshan's performance earned him his fourth Filmfare Best Actor Award. Critics were generally appreciative of Roshan's performance. Raja Sen of Rediff.com thought that Roshan "proves a very good Akbar. There are times when his inflection seems too modern, but the actor performs his all, slipping into the skin of the character and staying there." Roshan ended 2008 with an appearance in the popular item number "Krazzy 4" from the film of same name.

Following a small role in Zoya Akhtar's Luck by Chance in 2009, Roshan starred in and recorded "Kites in the Sky" for the multi-national romantic thriller Kites (2010). In the film, produced by his father, he played a man running a green card scam in Las Vegas in which he has married 11 different women in exchange for money. Kites opened on a record-breaking 3000 screens, and became the first Bollywood film to break into the North American top 10. However, the film eventually underperformed at India's box office and received negative reviews from critics. The website Box Office India attributed this failure to its multilingual dialogues. In a review for Rediff.com, Matthew Schneeberger thought that Roshan "overacts. A lot. In Kites, he nails a few scenes, but bungles many more, particularly the film's catastrophically bad ending."

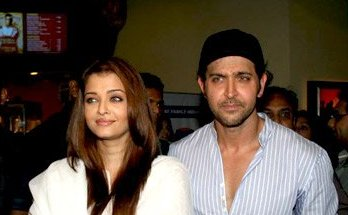
Roshan with co-star Aishwarya Rai promoting Guzaarish. A popular on-screen couple, they also starred together in Dhoom 2 and Jodhaa Akbar.

Roshan then collaborated with director Sanjay Leela Bhansali on the drama Guzaarish (2010) in which he had the role of Ethan Mascarenhas, a former magician suffering from quadriplegia, who, after years of struggle, files an appeal for euthanasia. Roshan had reservations about the role but agreed to the project after reading the film's story. To understand his role better, he interacted with paraplegic patients. In his own words, "I used to spend six hours with the patients, initially once a week and then once a month. I used to go to understand what they go through, what they think, and what their needs are. They have taught me a lot of things." He also trained with a Ukrainian magician to perform the film's magic stunts, and put on weight to look the part. The film failed at the box office, though it and Roshan's performance were positively received by critics. A writer for Zee News praised the chemistry between Roshan and Rai, adding that they "break the Bollywood mould of stereotypes." Roshan received the Zee Cine Award for Best Actor (Critics) and nominations for Filmfare, IIFA and Zee Cine Award for Best Actor.

In 2011, Roshan appeared in Zoya Akhtar's ensemble comedy-drama Zindagi Na Milegi Dobara alongside Abhay Deol and Farhan Akhtar as three friends who embark on a bachelor trip where they overcome their insecurities. Zoya cast Roshan in the role of an uptight workaholic as she considers him her favourite actor. For the film's soundtrack, Roshan recorded the song "Señorita" with his co-stars and María del Mar Fernández. Zindagi Na Milegi Dobara was released to positive reviews and Roshan's performance was praised. Rajeev Masand wrote, "Hrithik Roshan once again brings real depth to his character with a spectacular performance. He's shy and restrained, then lets go with such fantastic intensity that you make the inward journey with his character." The film grossed ₹1.53 billion (US$16 million) worldwide and became Roshan's first commercial success in three years. Later that year, he made a special appearance in Farhan's Don 2.

Roshan's only screen appearance in 2012 was in Karan Malhotra's Agneepath, a retelling of the 1990 film of the same name. Cast alongside Rishi Kapoor, Sanjay Dutt, and Priyanka Chopra, Roshan reinterpreted the character Vijay Deenanath Chauhan (originally played by Amitabh Bachchan), a common man who seeks revenge against an unscrupulous man for framing and murdering his father. Roshan was initially sceptical of taking up a role earlier played by Bachchan, and thought hard before accepting. He did not watch the original film for inspiration as he found his role to be completely different. In one of several accidents to happen during production, Roshan suffered a painful back injury. He deemed Agneepath "the hardest [project] I've ever worked in my life" owing to the exhaustion he felt while filming. The film broke Bollywood's highest opening-day earnings record, and had a worldwide gross of ₹1.93 billion (US$21 million). A Firstpost reviewer thought Roshan "breathes fire and soul into Agneepath". The actor received a third consecutive Stardust Award for Best Actor in a Drama, having won previously for Guzaarish and Zindagi Na Milegi Dobara.

=== 2013–present: Established actor with limited work ===
Roshan appeared in the third instalment of the Krrish film series—Krrish 3 (2013) which also starred Priyanka Chopra, Vivek Oberoi and Kangana Ranaut. During production, Roshan was injured when he fell down, which resulted in back pain. Critics thought that the film was entertaining but lacking in originality, though Roshan's performance garnered praise. The editor Komal Nahta lauded Roshan for playing three different characters in the film. Krrish 3 grossed ₹3.93 billion (US$42 million) worldwide, becoming one of the highest-grossing Indian films of all time. Roshan received a fourth and fifth consecutive Filmfare nomination for his performances in Krrish 3, and the 2014 action comedy Bang Bang!, a remake of the 2010 Hollywood release Knight and Day and one of the most expensive Bollywood films. Playing the role of an eccentric secret agent who plots to track down a terrorist, Roshan became the first actor to perform a flyboarding stunt in film. While filming in Thailand, Roshan suffered a head injury from a stunt accident and underwent brain surgery at the Hinduja Hospital performed by Dr. B. K. Misra to relieve subacute-subdural hematoma. Writing for Bollywood news website Koimoi, critic Mohar Basu noted that Roshan was "pitch perfect" and "breez[ed] through his part brilliantly." The film earned ₹3.4 billion (US$36 million) in global ticket sales, making it among the highest-grossing Indian films.

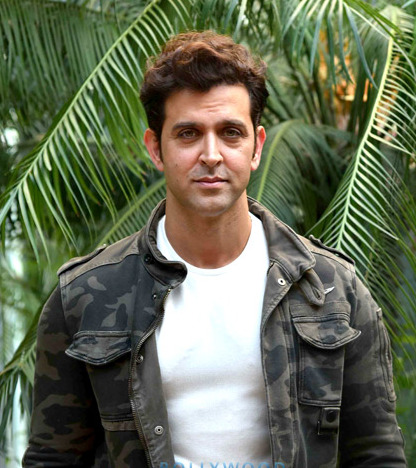
Roshan at a promotional event for Mohenjo Daro in 2016

For playing the role of a farmer in 2016 BC who travels to Mohenjo-daro in Ashutosh Gowariker's Mohenjo Daro (2016), Roshan was paid ₹500 million (US$5.3 million), a record-breaking remuneration for an Indian actor. He underwent a three-month training to achieve the "lithe" and "agile" physique required for his role. Despite being a highly anticipated release, it failed commercially, and critics were generally unenthusiastic. Dismissing the film as an "unintentional comedy", Anupama Chopra wrote that Roshan "pours his soul into every scene. But the burden of carrying this leaden, cartoon-like narrative proves too much even for his Herculean shoulders." Roshan was next seen alongside Yami Gautam in Sanjay Gupta's Kaabil (2017), a romantic thriller about a blind man who avenges the rape of his blind wife. To ensure authenticity in his portrayal, Roshan locked himself in a room for four days and avoided contact with people. Reviews for the film were generally positive with particular praise for Roshan's performance. Meena Iyer of The Times of India found his performance to be his best to date, and Shubhra Gupta on The Indian Express considered him "the only bright spot in this dispirited mess of a movie." The film accumulated ₹1.96 billion (US$21 million) worldwide.

After two years of screen absence, Roshan starred in two films in 2019, first in Vikas Bahl's biographical film Super 30, based on the mathematician Anand Kumar and his eponymous educational program. For the role, Roshan hired a trainer from Bhagalpur to learn Bihari accent. The film was released to mixed reviews but was a commercial success, grossing ₹2.08 billion (US$22 million) worldwide. While NDTV's Saibal Chatterjee found Roshan miscast in his role, Michael Gomes of Khaleej Times called it one of his best performances. Roshan found his biggest commercial success in the highest-grossing Bollywood film of 2019, the ₹4.75 billion (US$51 million)-earning action thriller War. The film, Roshan's first with Yash Raj Films since Dhoom 2, tells the story of an Indian soldier (Tiger Shroff) tasked with eliminating his former mentor (Roshan) who has gone rogue. Reviews for the film and the performances were positive; Rajeev Masand praised Roshan and Shroff for their commitment to the action, "bringing swag to the big stylish sequences and a visceral energy to the one-on-one punch-ups in the movie".

Roshan's next release was three years later in Vikram Vedha (2022), a remake of the Tamil film of the same name. The film tells the story of Vikram, a police inspector (Saif Ali Khan) who sets out to track down and kill Vedha (Roshan), a gangster. It received positive reviews from critics. Rachana Dubey of The Times of India praised Roshan's performance, writing that he "is menacing, ruthless and extremely emotional in parts". The film did not perform well commercially, leading Roshan to question the kind of roles he would do in the future. Roshan starred in Siddharth Anand's action film Fighter (2024), with Deepika Padukone and Anil Kapoor. For their roles as Indian Air Force officers, Roshan and Padukone underwent martial arts training. Ganesh Aaglave of Firstpost praised the emotional depth of Roshan's performance and his dialogue delivery.

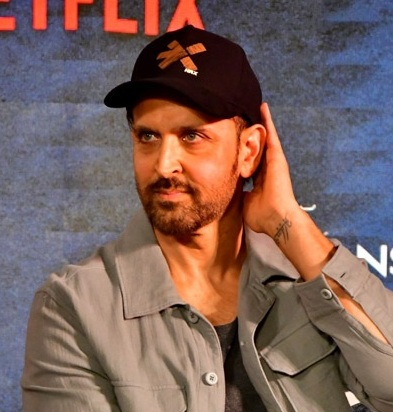
Roshan at the trailer launch of The Roshans in 2025

in 2025, Roshan reprised his role as Major Kabir Dhaliwal in the sequel War 2, which co-starred N. T. Rama Rao Jr. and Kiara Advani. With a budget of ₹4 billion (US$43 million), it is among the most expensive Indian films ever made. To prepare for the film, he trained in martial arts and learnt combat with a Japanese katana. In a negative review, a critic for Bollywood Hungama credited Roshan with salvaging an otherwise poorly-written script. The film emerged as a box-office bomb, which Roshan attributed to his own complacency during filming. In 2026, he made a cameo appearance in Rajinikanth's Jailer 2, thus reuniting with him after forty years of playing his son in Bhagwaan Dada.

He will next reprise his role as Krrish in the fourth instalment in the Krrish franchise, which will also mark his directorial debut and will be jointly produced by his father and Aditya Chopra. He will also star in an as yet-untitled project produced by Hombale Films, and will produce a web series titled Storm under his production company HRX Films, which will stream on Amazon Prime Video. He will also produce the comedy feature Mess through HRX Films in collaboration with Amazon Prime Video, marking his second partnership with the streaming platform.

== Other work ==
Roshan has performed on stage, appeared on television, and launched a clothing line. His first tour (Heartthrobs: Live in Concert (2002) with Kareena Kapoor, Karisma Kapoor, Arjun Rampal and Aftab Shivdasani) was successful in the United States and Canada. At the end of that year, he danced on stage with Amitabh Bachchan, Sanjay Dutt, Kareena Kapoor, Rani Mukerji and Shah Rukh Khan at Kings Park Stadium in Durban, South Africa in the show Now or Never. In 2011, Roshan served as a judge alongside Farah Khan and Vaibhavi Merchant for the dance competition reality show, Just Dance. He became the highest-paid film star on Indian television after he was paid ₹20 million (US$210,000) per episode. The show ran from June to October 2011. In November 2013, Roshan launched his clothing line, the casual wear brand HRx.

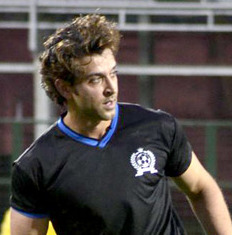
Roshan at a charity football match in 2014

Roshan is vocal about his childhood stammer. He actively supports the Dilkhush Special School for mentally challenged children in Mumbai. In 2008, he donated ₹2 million (US$21,000) to the Nanavati Hospital for the treatment of stammering children. Roshan set up a charity foundation in 2009 that aims to work for handicapped people. He donates roughly ₹700,000 (US$7,500) for charity every month, and believes that people should publicise their philanthropic work to set an example for others. In 2013, he took part in a festivity at Ghatkopar, whose proceeds went to an NGO supporting tribal girls suffering from malnutrition and starvation. Also that year, he donated ₹2.5 million (US$27,000) to help the victims of the 2013 North India floods.

Alongside other Bollywood stars, Roshan played a football match for charity organised by Aamir Khan's daughter, Ira, in 2014. The following year, he appeared with Sonam Kapoor in the music video for "Dheere Dheere", whose profits were donated to charity. Later that year, Roshan became the Indian brand ambassador for UNICEF and the Global Goals campaign's World's Largest Lesson that aims to educate children in over 100 countries about the Sustainable Development Goals. In 2016, Roshan and other Bollywood actors made donations for building homes for families affected by the 2015 South Indian floods.

Following his debut film, Roshan signed on for endorsement deals with Coca-Cola, Tamarind and Hero Honda, all for three years and for at least ₹30 million (US$320,000). As of 2010, he is celebrity endorser for such brands and products as Provogue, Parle Hide and Seek, Reliance Communications and Hero Honda and recently roshan has completed six years with Rado. The Times of India reported that Roshan received ₹12 million (US$130,000) to ₹15 million (US$160,000) for each endorsement, making him one of the highest-paid male celebrity endorsers. In 2016, Duff & Phelps estimated his brand value to be US$34.1 million, the eighth highest of Indian celebrities. In 2017, Roshan was signed as the brand ambassador of a Health and wellness startup Cure.fit and is touted as one of the largest endorsement deal signed by an Indian startup.

== Personal life ==
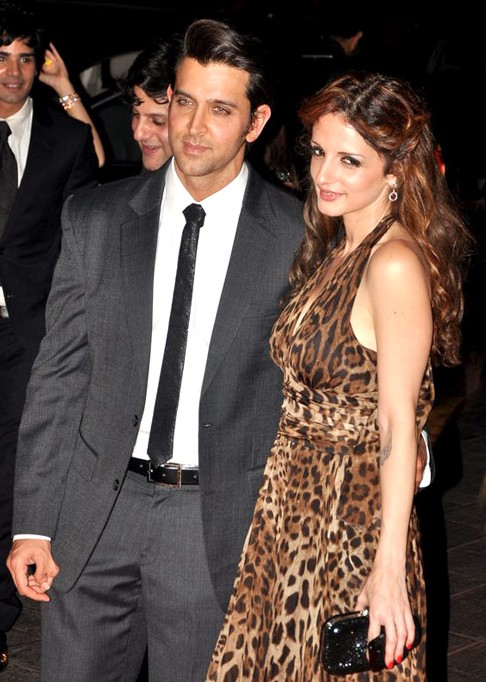
Roshan and Sussanne Khan (pictured in 2012) were married for fourteen years

On 20 December 2000, Roshan married Sussanne Khan in a private ceremony in Bangalore. Despite their religious difference—Roshan is a Hindu and Khan is a Muslim—Roshan says that he equally valued her beliefs. The couple has two sons, Hrehaan (born in 2006) and Hridhaan (born in 2008). Roshan and Sussanne separated in December 2013 and their divorce was finalised in November 2014. Both maintained that they parted amicably.

In 2016, Roshan had filed a lawsuit against Krrish 3 co-star Kangana Ranaut for cyber stalking and harassment. Denying the charges, Ranaut filed a counter-charge claiming that his lawsuit was an attempt to cover up an affair. Owing to a lack of evidence, the Mumbai Police closed the case later that year. As of 2022, Roshan is dating actress Saba Azad.

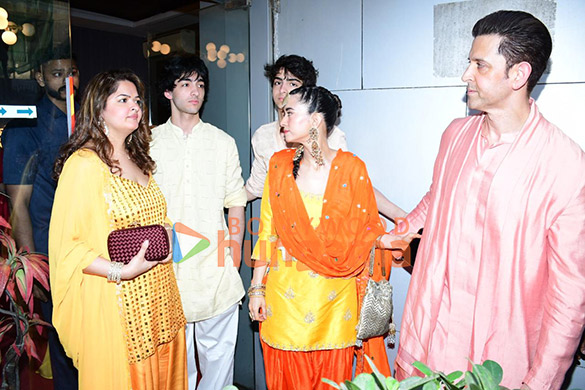
Roshan with his sons Hrehaan (second from left), Hridhaan (middle), niece Suranika (extreme left) and Saba Azad in 2025

Roshan had considered quitting the film industry after two assailants fired bullets at his father in 2000. Later that December, he was involved in a controversy when Nepalese newspapers and Jamim Shah's Channel Nepal accused him of stating in a Star Plus interview that he hated Nepal and its people. This led to protests in the country, a ban on the screening of his films, and four people's deaths after street violence. Nepalese people threatened to "bury [him] alive" if he ever visited the country. Star Plus, for its part, stated that Roshan "did not touch upon Nepal." The violence calmed down after Roshan wrote a two-page rejoinder in which he denied having made any claim against the country. Nepali actress Manisha Koirala helped distribute it to newspapers and a local television station.

In October 2025, amid rising misuse of public figures' voices and likenesses through AI and deepfakes, Roshan filed a plea in Delhi High Court requesting to protect his personality rights following similar actions by the Bachchans, Karan Johar, Kumar Sanu. The actor was granted relief on the grounds of "to remove specific posts infringing upon his personality rights with the unauthorized use of his name, image and likeness". However, he was declined "to order the immediate take down of those which were by the fan pages dedicated to the actor".

== Artistry and media image ==
As the son of the filmmaker Rakesh Roshan, he faced the media spotlight from a young age. Discussing nepotism in Bollywood, Shama Rana views him as one of several actors who managed film careers with the help of family relations in the industry. On the other hand, Roshan is acknowledged in the media for his devotion to his work and for his ability to commit heavily to each role. He insists on learning any necessary skills and performing stunts himself, and is particularly known for his professionalism. The director Ashutosh Gowariker praised Roshan when he continued filming Mohenjo Daro despite several injuries and being in a troubled state of mind. Zoya Akhtar, who considers Roshan her favourite actor, and directed him in Zindagi Na Milegi Dobara, remarks on his ability to display a range of emotions on screen.

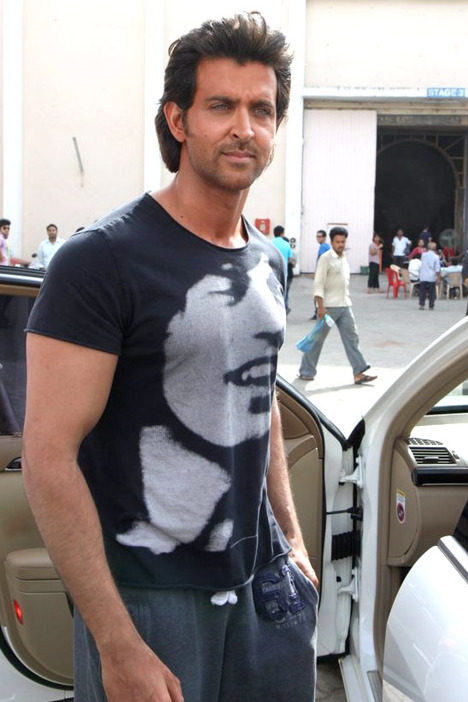
Roshan is frequently cited as a sex symbol and a style icon by the Indian media.

In an attempt to avoid typecasting, Roshan takes on diverse parts. He looks at the scripts as a platform to inspire with the strength and courage of his characters and to make his audiences smile. Roshan was noted by critics for his versatility in portraying a variety of characters in Koi... Mil Gaya (2003), Lakshya (2004), Jodhaa Akbar (2008), and Guzaarish (2010). Box Office India ranked him first on its top actors listing in 2000 and later included him in 2003, 2004, 2006, and 2007. Roshan topped Rediff.com's list of best Bollywood actors in 2003, and was ranked fourth in 2006. Filmfare magazine included two of his performances—from Koi... Mil Gaya and Lakshya—on its 2010 list of 80 Iconic Performances. In March 2011, Roshan placed fourth on Rediff.com's list of Top 10 Actors of 2000–2010.

Roshan's dancing ability has drawn praise from the media, an opinion he disagrees with. The Los Angeles Times finds him to be "a sensational dancer" who "has the dashing, chiseled looks of a silent movie matinee idol." Although author Nandana Bose attributed Roshan's popularity to Bollywood's preoccupation with traditional hypermasculinity, she wrote that he sets himself apart by showcasing dancing talent and "transnational, transfigurative corporeality". According to Bose, Roshan's stardom is marked by his ability to seamlessly transition between roles, from dancing star to credible superhero, shaping the industry's landscape. Some critics believe that he is only able to dance and act in his father's films. Sanya Panwar of Hindustan Times criticised his inclination towards "glamorous, albeit empty" and stereotypical parts.

Roshan has established himself as a sex symbol and a style icon in India. In 2006, Roshan was one of the four Bollywood actors, along with Priyanka Chopra, Kajol and Shah Rukh Khan, whose miniature dolls were launched in the United Kingdom, under the name of "Bollywood Legends". He topped The Times of India's listing of 50 Most Desirable Men in 2010 and ranked among the top five for the next five years. In 2010 and 2012, the Indian edition of GQ included him in their listing of Bollywood's best dressed men. A life-size, wax figure of him was installed at London's Madame Tussauds museum in January 2011, making him the fifth Indian actor to have been replicated as a wax statue there. Versions of the statue were installed at Madame Tussauds' museums in New York, Washington and other cities in the world. Roshan regularly features in the magazine Eastern Eye's listing of the 50 Sexiest Asian Men. He topped the list in 2011, 2012, and 2014, and featured among the top five in 2010, 2013, and 2015 to 2018.

Roshan is among Bollywood's highest-paid actors. Discussing his success ratio at the box office in a 2014 article, Daily News and Analysis credited him as "the most bankable star" in Bollywood. He was named the second most powerful Indian film star by Forbes in 2001. He ranked fourth in Filmfare Power List in 2007. In a 2009 poll conducted by Daily News and Analysis Roshan was voted one of India's most popular icons. At the 2009 FICCI-IIFA Awards, Roshan was one of the ten recipients of the most powerful Bollywood entertainers of the 2000s. From 2012 to 2019, Roshan was placed on Forbes India's Celebrity 100—a list based on the income and popularity of Indian celebrities—peaking at ninth position in 2014 with an annual income of ₹850 million (US$9.1 million).

== Accolades ==
Roshan has received six Filmfare Awards out of eighteen nominations: Best Actor for Kaho Naa... Pyaar Hai, Koi... Mil Gaya, Dhoom 2 and Jodhaa Akbar, Best Actor – Critics for Koi... Mil Gaya and Best Male Debut for Kaho Naa... Pyaar Hai.

== Literary sources ==
- Bharat, Meenakshi; Kumar, Nirmal (2012). Filming the Line of Control: The Indo–Pak Relationship through the Cinematic Lens. Routledge. ISBN 978-1-136-51605-4.
- Bose, Nandana (2020). "From Superman to Shahenshah: Stardom and the Transnational Corporeality of Hrithik Roshan". In Sen, Meheli; Basu, Anustup (eds.). Figurations in Indian Film. Palgrave Macmillan. pp. 158–169. ISBN 978-1-1373-4978-1.
- Dawar, Ramesh (2006). Bollywood: Yesterday, Today, Tomorrow. Star Publications. ISBN 978-1-905863-01-3.
- Jess-Cooke, Carolyn (2009). Film Sequels: Theory and Practice from Hollywood to Bollywood: Theory and Practice from Hollywood to Bollywood. Edinburgh University Press. ISBN 978-0-7486-3133-9.
- Krämer, Lucia (2016). Bollywood in Britain: Cinema, Brand, Discursive Complex. Bloomsbury Publishing. ISBN 978-1-5013-0758-4.
- Outlook. Hathway Investments Pvt Limited. 2005.
