= List of awards and nominations received by Hrithik Roshan =

Hrithik Roshan awards and nominations
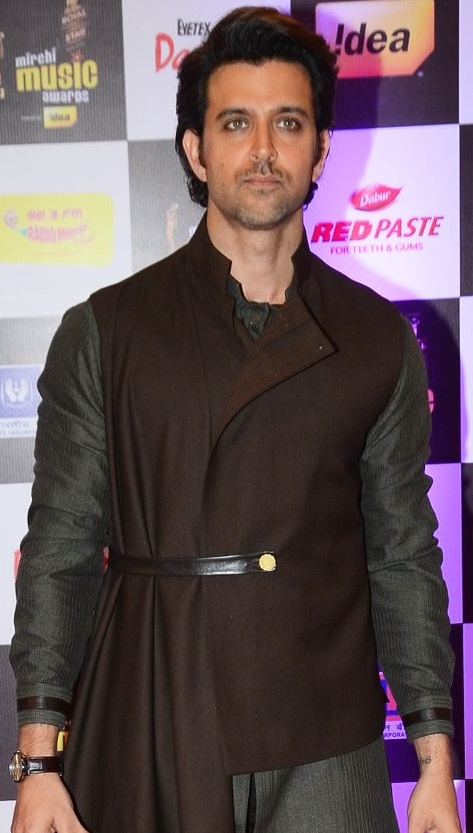
- Roshan at Mirchi Music Awards
Awards and nominations
Award	Wins	Nominations
Producers Guild Film Awards	19	10
Filmfare Awards	6	15
IIFA Awards	12	14
Screen Awards	16	18
Stardust Awards	15	18
Zee Cine Awards	17	19
Bollywood Movie Awards	5	0
Bengal Film Journalists' Association Awards	2	0
BIG Star Entertainment Awards	1	0
Golden Minbar International Film Festival	1	0
Other awards	23	27

Totals (Note: Certain award groups do not simply award one winner. They acknowledge several different recipients, have runners-up, and have third place. Since this is a specific recognition and is different from losing an award, runner-up mentions are considered wins in this award tally. For simplification and to avoid errors, each award in this list has been presumed to have had a prior nomination.)
- Wins: 117
- Nominations: 270

Hrithik Roshan is an Indian actor. He is regarded as one of the best actors in India and one of India's biggest film stars as well as one of the country's richest actors. Having appeared as a child actor in several films throughout the 1980s, Roshan made his film debut In leading role in Kaho Naa... Pyaar Hai in 2000. His performance in the film earned him the Best Actor and Best Male Debut awards at Filmfare. He followed it with leading roles in Fiza and Mission Kashmir (both released in 2000) and a supporting part in the blockbuster ensemble family drama Kabhi Khushi Kabhie Gham (2001).

Following through with several unnoticed performances from 2002 to 2003, he starred in the blockbusters sci-fi Koi... Mil Gaya (2003) and its sequel Krrish (2006), both of which won him numerous Best Actor awards. Roshan received his third Filmfare Award for Best Actor for his performance in the action film Dhoom 2 (2006), and his fourth for Jodhaa Akbar (2008) for which he was also awarded at the Golden Minbar International Film Festival. He later received further acclaim for his work in Guzaarish (2010), Zindagi Na Milegi Dobara (2011) and Agneepath (2012) and Krrish 3 (2013), his biggest commercial success so far. He thus established himself as one of the best actors in Indian cinema.

== Filmfare Awards ==
Year	Category	Film	Result
2001	Best Male Debut	Kaho Naa... Pyaar Hai	Won
2001	Best Actor	Kaho Naa... Pyaar Hai	Won
2001	Best Actor	Fiza	Nominated
2002	Best Supporting Actor	Kabhi Khushi Kabhie Gham	Nominated
2004	Best Actor (Critics)	Koi... Mil Gaya	Won
2004	Best Actor	Koi... Mil Gaya	Won
2005	Best Actor	Lakshya	Nominated
2007	Best Actor	Dhoom 2	Won
2007	Best Actor	Krrish	Nominated
2009	Best Actor	Jodhaa Akbar	Won
2011	Best Actor	Guzaarish	Nominated
2012	Best Actor	Zindagi Na Milegi Dobara	Nominated
2013	Best Actor	Agneepath	Nominated
2014	Best Actor	Krrish 3	Nominated
2015	Best Actor	Bang Bang!	Nominated
2018	Best Actor	Kaabil	Nominated
2020	Best Actor	Super 30	Nominated
2023	Best Actor	Vikram Vedha	Nominated
2025	Best Actor	Fighter	Nominated

== International Indian Film Academy Awards ==
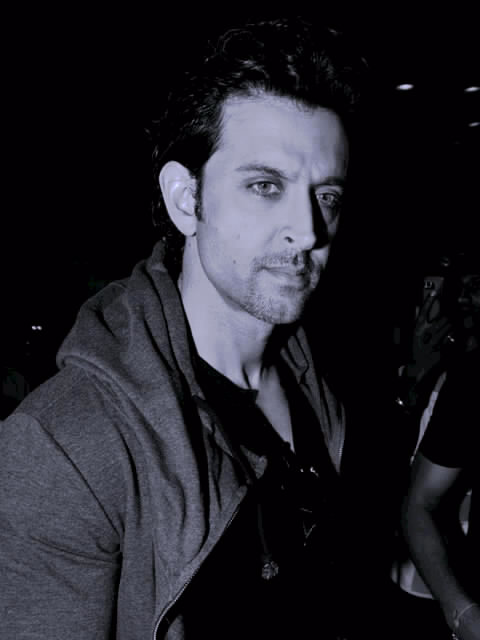
Roshan leaving for IIFA Awards, 2014

Year	Category	Film
2001	Best Male Debut	Kaho Naa... Pyaar Hai
2001	Personality of the Year	Kaho Naa... Pyaar Hai
2001	Best Actor	Kaho Naa... Pyaar Hai
2004	Best Actor	Koi... Mil Gaya
2005	Style Icon of the Year	Lakshya
2007	Glamorous Star Award	Dhoom 2
2007	Best Actor	Krrish
2009	Best Actor	Jodhaa Akbar
2009	Style Icon of the Year	Luck by Chance
2023	Best Actor	Vikram Vedha

== Screen Awards ==
Year	Category	Film	Result
2001	Best Debut - Male	Kaho Naa... Pyaar Hai	Won
2001	Best Actor	Kaho Naa... Pyaar Hai	Won
2004	Best Actor	Koi... Mil Gaya	Won
2007	Best Actor	Krrish	Won
2009	Best Actor	Jodhaa Akbar	Won
2011	Jodi No. 1	Guzaarish (along with Aishwarya Rai)	Nominated
2012	Best Ensemble Cast	Zindagi Na Milegi Dobara	Nominated
2019	Best Actor	War	Nominated

== Zee Cine Awards ==
- 2001: Best Male Debut for Kaho Naa... Pyaar Hai
- 2001: Best Actor – Male for Kaho Naa... Pyaar Hai
- 2004: Best Actor – Male for Koi... Mil Gaya
- 2004: Best Actor – Male (Critics) for Koi... Mil Gaya
- 2007: Best Actor – Male for Krrish
- 2011: Best Actor – Male (Critics) for Guzaarish
- 2020: Best Actor – Male for Super 30

Nominations

- 2017: Best Actor – Male for Kaabil

== Bollywood Movie Awards ==
- 2001: Best Male Debut for Kaho Naa... Pyaar Hai
- 2001: Best Actor for Kaho Naa... Pyaar Hai
- 2002: Best Supporting Actor for Kabhi Khushi Kabhie Gham
- 2004: Best Actor (Critics) for Koi... Mil Gaya
- 2004: Best Actor for Koi... Mil Gaya
- 2007: Best Actor for Dhoom 2

== Stardust Awards ==
- 2005: Editors' Choice for Best Performance for Lakshya
- 2009: Star of the Year Award - Male for Jodhaa Akbar
- 2011: Best Actor - Drama for Guzaarish
- 2012: Best Actor - Drama for Zindagi Na Milegi Dobara
- 2013: Best Actor - Drama for Agneepath

== Bengal Film Journalists' Association Awards ==
- 2001: Best Actor for Fiza
- 2007: Best Actor for Krrish

== BIG Star Entertainment Awards ==
- 2013: Best Actor in an Action Film for Krrish 3

== Apsara Film & Television Producers Guild Awards ==
- 2004: Best Actor in a Leading Role for Koi... Mil Gaya
- 2008: ARY Style Icon Award (after being voted as style icon by Pakistani audiences)
- 2009: Best Actor in a Leading Role for Jodhaa Akbar
- 2011: Cinematic Excellence (Male) for Guzaarish

== Golden Minbar International Film Festival ==
- 2008: Golden Minbar International Film Festival for Muslim Cinema (Kazan, Russia) - Best Actor for Jodhaa Akbar

== Other film awards ==
- 2001: Screen Videocon Awards, Best Male Debut for Kaho Naa... Pyaar Hai
- 2001: Screen Videocon Awards, Best Actor for Kaho Naa... Pyaar Hai
- 2004: FICCI Hall Of Fame Awards, Best Actor for Koi... Mil Gaya
- 2007: GIFA Award for Best Actor for Krrish
- 2007: Anandlok Awards, Best Male Actor for Krrish
- 2012: Lions Favourite Actor (Critics) - Agneepath

Nominations

- 2011: Mirchi Music Awards for Upcoming Male Vocalist of The Year for "Senorita" from Zindagi Na Milegi Dobara

== Other awards ==
- 2005: MTV Immies Awards, Best Performance in a Song - Male for "Main Aisa Kyon Hoon" for Lakshya
- 2006: Idea Zee F Awards, Youth Style Icon in Films
- 2009: Indian Youth Icon Awards: Indian Youth Icon of the Year for his contribution in the field of entertainment.
- 2014: Nickelodeon Kids' Choice Awards India, Best Dancer
- 2023: ITA Award for the Star of the Millenium

== Honours and recognitions ==
- In March 2001, he was ranked 2nd Most Powerful Indian Film Star by Forbes.
- In August 2001, he was honoured with National Citizen's Award for his contribution to Indian Cinema.
- In 2003, he was honoured with the Awadh Samman by the Government of Uttar Pradesh for his outstanding contribution to Indian Cinema.
- In 2004, he was honoured with the Rajiv Gandhi Young Achiever Award.
- In May 2006, he was conferred with the prestigious Sahara Awadh Samman in a glittering ceremony during finale at the fortnight-long Lucknow Mahotsav.
- In December 2006, he was honoured during the International Film Festival of India (IFFI) in Panaji for his contributions to mainstream cinema.
- In February 2009, he was among the 10 recipients of the IIFA-FICCI Frames Awards for the "Most Powerful Entertainers of the Decade".
- In 2009 he was credited as a fantastic dancer by Los Angeles newspaper.
- No wonder then that these guys are voted as India's Most Desirable in 2010.
- On 20 January 2011, his life-size wax figure was installed at London's prestigious Madame Tussauds Wax Museum, making him the fifth Indian actor to have been replicated as a wax statue in the museum.
- In 2011, he was voted as the "Sexiest Asian in the World" by the Eastern Eye Weekly.
- In February 2012, he was voted as the "Most Lovable Star".
- On 5 December 2012, Roshan's wax image has been unveiled at Madame Tussauds museum Washington, DC.
- In December 2012, he was crowned for the second year in a row as the "Sexiest Asian Man in the World" by the Eastern Eye Weekly.
- In December 2014, he was voted the world's sexiest Asian man for the third time in four years.
- In January 2018, he was voted the most handsome actor in the world by a website of which majority of traffic comes from India.
- In January 2025, he was honoured at Joy Awards of Saudi Arabia in Riyadh for contributing twenty-five years to the entertainment industry.
