= Rashad Hussain =

American diplomat (born 1979)

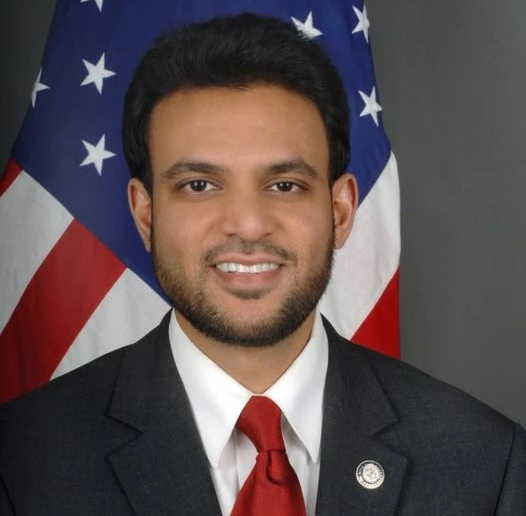
- Rashad Hussain

6th United States Ambassador-at-Large for International Religious Freedom
- In office January 24, 2022 – January 20, 2025
- President: Joe Biden
- Preceded by: Sam Brownback

United States Special Envoy for Strategic Counterterrorism Communications
- In office February 18, 2015 – January 20, 2017
- President: Barack Obama
- Preceded by: position established

United States Special Envoy to the Organization of Islamic Cooperation
- In office February 13, 2010 – February 18, 2015
- President: Barack Obama
- Preceded by: Sada Cumber

Personal details
- Born: September 19, 1979 (age 47) Wyoming, U.S.
- Education: University of North Carolina, Chapel Hill (BA); Harvard University (MPA, MA); Yale University (JD)

Rashad Hussain is an American attorney, diplomat, and professor, who served as the United States Ambassador-at-Large for International Religious Freedom, Associate White House Counsel, and as United States Special Envoy to the Organisation of Islamic Cooperation (OIC). He was also U.S. Special Envoy for Strategic Counterterrorism Communications and served on the United States National Security Council and in the Department of Justice as a trial attorney and a criminal and national security prosecutor.

== Early life and education ==
Hussain was born in Wyoming and raised in Plano, Texas, the son of Indian-American immigrants. Hussain is a graduate of Greenhill School in Dallas, Texas. While at Greenhill, Hussain was a member of the school's nationally recognized policy-debate team, partnering with Josh Goldberg to win the Texas state debate championship and a number of national tournament championships.

Hussain completed a bachelor's degree in two years, in both philosophy and political science, from the University of North Carolina at Chapel Hill, where he was elected to Phi Beta Kappa. His philosophy thesis was titled "Assessing the Theistic Implications of Big Bang Cosmological Theory." He subsequently obtained an MPA from the John F. Kennedy School of Government and a Master's degree in Arabic and Islamic Studies, both from Harvard University. After Harvard, he worked as a legislative aide for the House Judiciary Committee, where he served during the September 11, 2001 terrorist attacks and reviewed the Patriot Act and other bills. He then earned a J.D. from Yale Law School where he served as an editor of the Yale Law Journal.

Following law school, Hussain served as a law clerk for civil rights icon Damon J. Keith of the United States Court of Appeals for the Sixth Circuit.

== Career ==
=== Office of White House Counsel ===
In January 2009, Hussain was named deputy associate counsel to President Barack Obama. Previously, he served as a trial attorney at the U.S. Department of Justice and as Associate Counsel to the Obama Presidential Transition Team.

The Washington Post reported that, "After the 2008 election, Hussain was recruited to the White House Counsel's office by Greg Craig and Cassandra Butts, a fellow Tar Heel and Obama's former Harvard Law classmate. He has worked there on national security and new media issues, and helped inform the administration's Muslim outreach efforts.

Hussain also "began advising the president on issues related to Islam after joining the White House counsel’s office in January 2009." Ben Rhodes, Obama's chief foreign policy speechwriter and Deputy National Security Advisor, sought Hussain's counsel as he drafted the president's Cairo address and other speeches to Muslim audiences. Hussain also joined the President and the staff that traveled to Egypt for the speech at Cairo University in 2009.

=== U.S. Special Envoy to the Organisation of Islamic Cooperation ===
On February 13, 2010, President Obama appointed the 31-year old Hussain as the United States Special Envoy to the Organisation of Islamic Cooperation.

Upon appointing the 31-year old White House attorney as one of the youngest posted American ambassadors and highest ranking Muslim American officials Obama stated: "as an accomplished lawyer and a close and trusted member of my White House staff, Rashad has played a key role in developing the partnerships I called for in Cairo, and as a Hafiz of the Quran, he is a respected member of the American Muslim community, and I thank him for carrying forward this important work." The Washington Post stated in addition to his personal background, "Muslims abroad are ... likely to take note of his White House credentials, and access to the Oval Office, as he seeks partnerships in education, health, science and technology."

It also noted that Hussain "briefed Obama before his first interview as president--with Al Arabiya, contributed to Obama's two major speeches to Muslims--in Ankara, Turkey and Cairo, traveled to the Middle East with Secretary of State Hillary Rodham Clinton, and, closer to home, helped organize a Ramadan dinner at the White House that replaced the usual crowd of ambassadors with young American Muslims." He also helped put on a 2010 Presidential Global Entrepreneurship Summit hosted by President Obama.

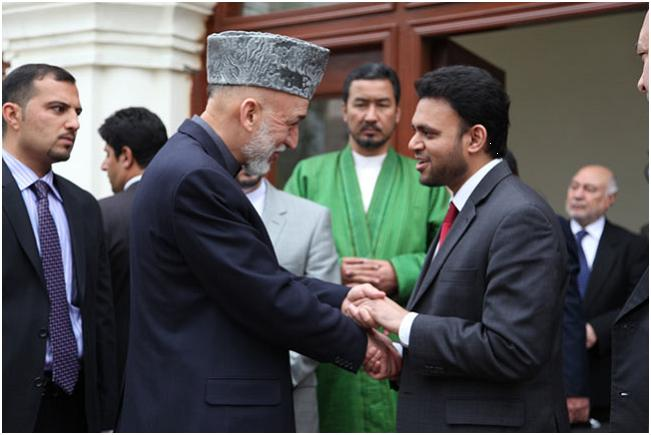
Former Afghan President Karzai greets Rashad Hussain in Kabul in 2012

In his role as Envoy to the OIC, the second largest intergovernmental body after the UN, Hussain traveled to numerous countries and international gatherings, served as a foreign policy advisor, and met with foreign leaders and Muslim communities around the world. His position, "a kind of ambassador at large to Muslim countries was created by President George W. Bush," and the Washington Post described Hussain as member of the President Obama's "spiritual cabinet."

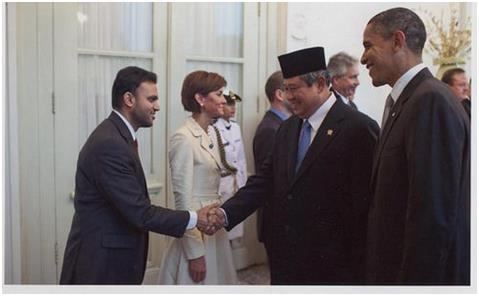
Rashad Hussain with President Yudhoyono of Indonesia

During his travel to OIC member countries, Hussain has held meetings with a number of leaders, including President Karzai of Afghanistan, President Gul of Turkey, King Abdullah of Saudi Arabia, President Susilo Bambang Yudhoyono of Indonesia, Prime Minister Najib of Malaysia, President Zardari of Pakistan, Prime Minister Aziz of Mauritania, President Sall of Senegal, President Buhari of Nigeria, and OIC Secretary General Ihsanoglu. Hussain also attended the OIC Heads of State Summit in Egypt and in Mecca, Saudi Arabia is 2012, where he met with a number of leaders, including a pre-dawn Ramadan meal with King Abdullah of Saudi Arabia, and held other meetings with President Gul of Turkey and President Karzai of Afghanistan. They discussed a number of issues, including Syria, the democratic transitions in the Middle East and North Africa, and U.S. engagement with Muslim communities around the world. Hussain also led an international peacemaking delegation to the Central African Republic in 2014 to meet with President Samba-Panza and civil society leaders.

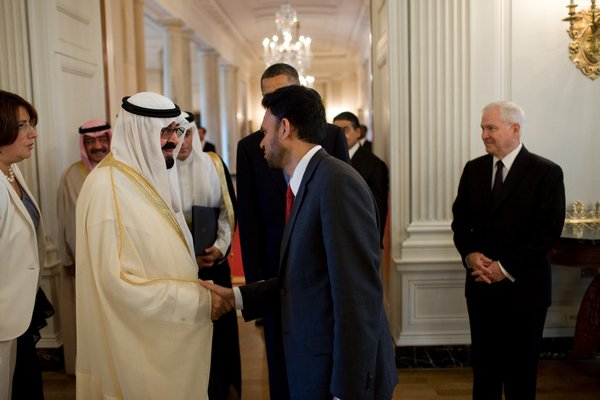
Hussain with President Obama, King Abdullah & Sec. Defense Gates

While Hussain served as Special Envoy, the U.S. and OIC increased cooperation in health and development, including OIC-USAID cooperation on humanitarian aid, and have expanded partnerships in entrepreneurship, and science and technology. The OIC has been increasingly active in condemning violent extremism, including attacks on religious minorities, and the kidnapping of school girls by Boko Haram in Nigeria. The U.S. worked with the OIC to eliminate the OIC's previous heavily criticized "defamation of religion" resolution at the UN and replace it with a resolution that removes the "defamation" concept and seeks to counter intolerance without restricting speech in a manner inconsistent with U.S. law. The OIC has also taken a larger role in international affairs - it was among the first to call for a no-fly zone in Libya and has been heavily critical of Bashar al-Assad's regime, removing Syria from the OIC in 2012.

=== Work to protect human rights and religious minorities ===
Hussain has worked on efforts to improve the protection of Christians, Jews, and other religious minorities living in Muslim-majority countries. He has also sought to combat antisemitism by denouncing Holocaust denial and the publication of antisemitic materials in the Muslim world. In an op-ed on addressing antisemitism in the Muslim world, he condemned the broadcast of an antisemitic film aired in some Muslim-majority countries, arguing that Jews and Christians face discrimination and violence in these countries and that "Efforts must be made to ensure that textbooks and television programming in the Muslim world are free from the types of dehumanizing ideas and images that breed intolerance and hate." Speaking to Foreign Ministers of Muslim countries at the OIC Ministerial in Guinea in 2013, he also criticized "restrictions on places of worship, including churches and synagogues" as "unacceptable." He has also condemned blasphemy laws on other restrictions on speech that are used to persecute religious minorities, including Coptic Christians in Egypt, where he visited with an American Coptic leader in 2012.

Hussain has also traveled to a number of countries to address persecution of Muslim communities, including the Central African Republic, Uighur Muslims in Xinjiang, China, India, the Rohingya population from Myanmar, and a number of European nations.

In May 2013, Hussain and the U.S. Special Envoy to Monitor and Combat Anti-Semitism traveled with imams from around the world to Holocaust sites in Auschwitz-Birkenau as part of Hussain's "efforts to combat Holocaust denial and to address discrimination against religious minorities." He also took a similar trip with American imams to Holocaust sites in 2010. Hussain has been outspoken against antisemitism during his other travels, including his rebuttal of an antisemitic tirade during a trip to India in 2010.

ADL President Abraham Foxman noted that Hussain's condemnation of "anti-Semitism in the Muslim and Arab world is significant" and that "influential figures, particularly political and religious leaders in the Muslim and Arab world, should emulate Ambassador Hussain's example." In January 2013, Mr. Hussain received the Distinguished Honor Award from Secretary of State Hillary Clinton, which is given for "exceptionally outstanding service to the agencies of the U.S. Government resulting in achievements of marked national or international significance."

=== U.S. Special Envoy for Strategic Counterterrorism Communications ===
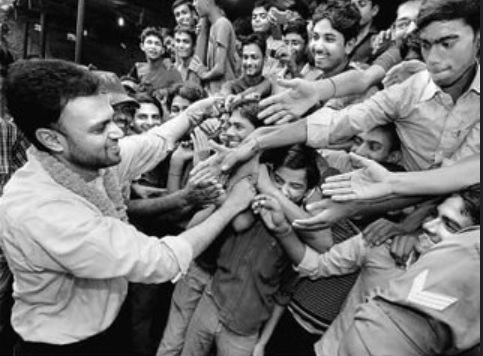
Rashad Hussain greeting students during his visit to Super 30 in Patna, August 2010.

Hussain has also been actively involved in international religious freedom and counterterrorism efforts, and his appointment as Special Envoy for Strategic Counterterrorism Communications was announced by President Obama at a White House Summit in 2015. Hussain, who has been named one of the world's 500 most influential Muslims, outlined a strategy for countering terrorist propaganda emphasizing a shift to non-governmental messaging, helped develop messaging centers in the UAE, Nigeria, Malaysia, and in Saudi Arabia.

During a visit to Patna, India, in August 2010, Hussain met students at Super 30, the coaching institute founded by mathematician Anand Kumar and he described Super 30 as "the best institute in India".

In 2015, The Washington Post reported that Hussain was appointed to shift US messaging efforts by building partnerships with international NGOs and other governments to counter terrorist propaganda. Hussain outlined an approach for "supporting NGOs who are countering ISIL's narrative and helping other countries to establish their own counter-ISIL messaging centers" and highlighting ISIS's damage to local populations, "emphasizing accounts of [ISIS] defectors, and documenting its losses on the battlefield—without recirculating its gruesome images or matching its snide tone." Hussain called for messaging to highlight terrorists' damage to Muslim and other populations, the stories of "defectors," ISIS's battlefield losses, and living conditions in ISIS territories. He also called for "Muslim-hosted and run messaging initiatives to take a leading role" in expanding "counter-messaging and positive narratives." In 2015, Hussain worked with international organizations in leading an international defectors messaging campaign to highlight the stories of those who left terrorist organizations.

Hussain co-authored a paper, "Reformulating the Battle of Ideas: Understanding the Role of Islam in Counterterrorism Policy" for the Brookings Institution. It sharply rejects those who commit terrorist acts in the name of religion, including those who seek to use Islamic justifications for such actions. In a speech to a meeting of Foreign Ministers from 56 Muslim-majority countries, Hussain stated, "It is our duty to eradicate this ideology completely and blaming the foreign policy of any country is not the answer. No policy grievance justifies the slaughter of innocent people." He has also held discussions on the topic of violent extremism with government and civil society in trips to countries such as Afghanistan, Pakistan, and Yemen.

In addressing extremism, Hussain has also argued that Muslim communities must improve secular and religious education for boys and girls, increase access to opportunity through job creation, address the sense of political disenfranchisement in Muslim communities, and improve deradicalization programming. In a panel hosted by Peter Bergen on online radicalization in 2013, Hussain described the extremists' online approach as combining a message of religious obligation to defend Muslim causes with emotional international images in a way that attempts to provide a sense of purpose to disaffected youth. He encouraged Muslim communities to create online media content that acknowledges perceived grievances, but uses imagery and religious content to make clear that terrorists are actually killing Muslims, damaging Muslim causes, and violating Islam, not defending it.

=== Ambassador at-large for international religious freedom ===
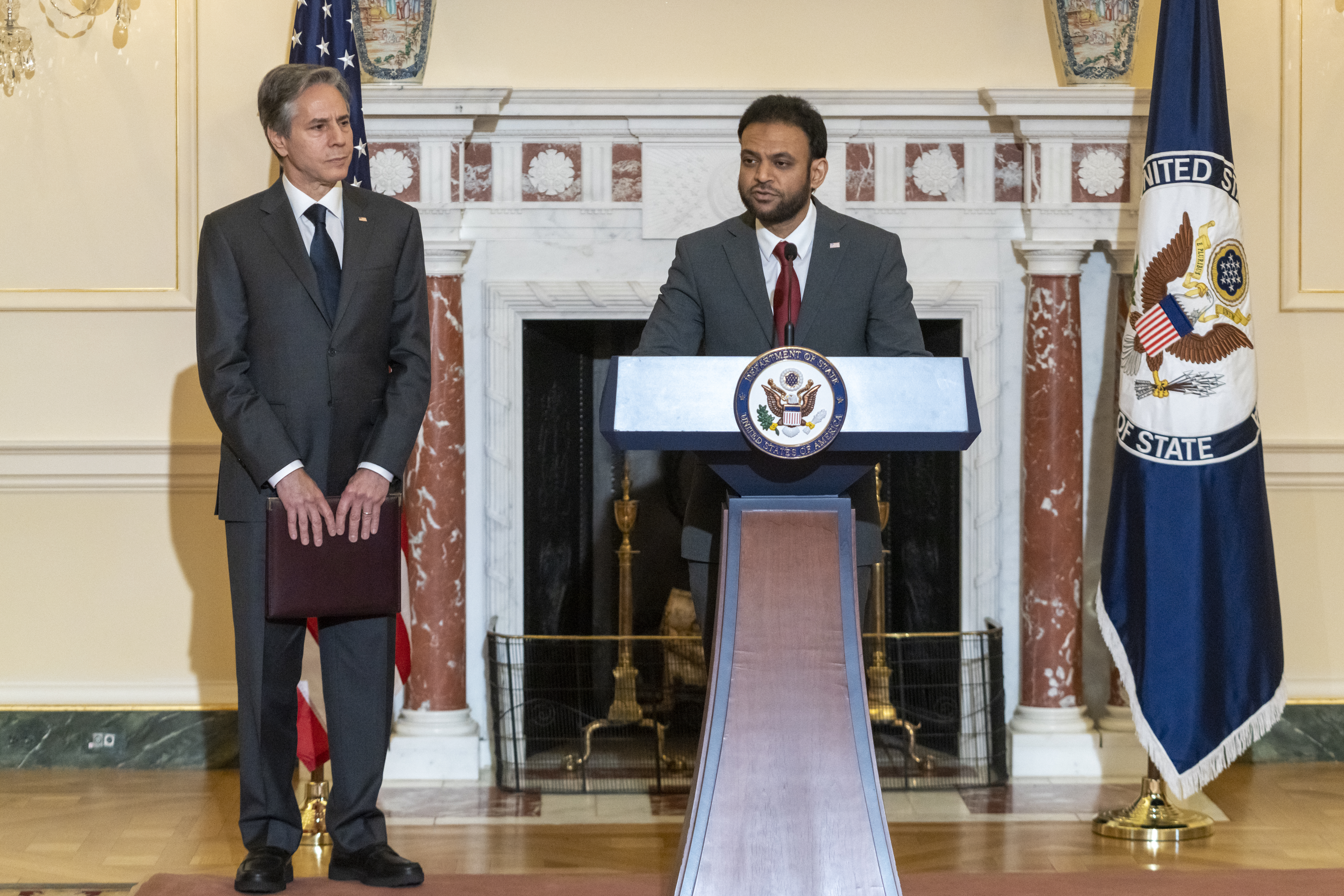
Hussain with Secretary of State Antony Blinken in 2022

On July 30, 2021, President Joe Biden nominated Hussain to be the U.S. Ambassador at-large for International Religious Freedom. Hearings on his nomination were held before the Senate Foreign Relations Committee on October 26, 2021. The committee favorably reported his nomination on December 15, 2021. On December 16, 2021, the Senate voted 85–5 to confirm Hussain's nomination as United States Ambassador-at-Large for International Religious Freedom.

== Personal life ==
Hussain speaks English, Urdu, Arabic, and Spanish.

== Works ==
- "Protecting the Rights of Christians and Religious Minorities in the Muslim World"
- "A Strategy for Countering Terrorist Propaganda in the Digital Age"
- "Reformulating the Battle of Ideas: The Role of Islam in Counterterrorism Policy" Brookings Institution (2008)
- "Countering Violent Extremism and Terrorist Recruiting in the Digital Age"
- "Why the United States Cannot Agree to Disagree on Blasphemy laws"; Boston University International Law Journal (2014)
- "Security with Transparency: Judicial Review in "Special Interest" Immigration Proceedings; Yale Law Journal113 Yale L.J. 1333 (2004)
- "Costs of Post-9/11 National Security Strategy, The"
- "Countering anti-Semitism in the Month of Ramadan"
