= Super 30 (film) =

2019 Indian Hindi-language biographical film

- Theatrical release poster
- Directed by: Vikas Bahl
- Written by: Sanjeev Dutta
- Based on: Anand Kumar
- Produced by: Sajid Nadiadwala; Anurag Kashyap; Vikramaditya Motwane
- Starring: Hrithik Roshan; Mrunal Thakur; Nandish Sandhu; Virendra Saxena; Pankaj Tripathi; Aditya Srivastava; Amit Sadh
- Narrated by: Vijay Varma
- Cinematography: Anay Goswamy
- Edited by: A. Sreekar Prasad
- Music by: Ajay–Atul
- Production companies: Phantom Films; Nadiadwala Grandson Entertainment; HRX Films
- Distributed by: Reliance Entertainment (India); Luv Films (International)
- Release date: 12 July 2019
- Running time: 155 minutes
- Country: India
- Language: Hindi
- Budget: ₹60 crore
- Box office: ₹208.93 crore

Super 30 is a 2019 Indian Hindi-language biographical drama film directed by Vikas Bahl, written by Sanjeev Dutta and produced by Phantom Films, Nadiadwala Grandson Entertainment, Reliance Entertainment and HRX Films. Named after mathematician and teacher Anand Kumar's eponymous educational program, it stars Hrithik Roshan as Kumar; Nandish Sandhu in his film debut, Virendra Saxena, Mrunal Thakur in her first mainstream Hindi film, Pankaj Tripathi, Aditya Srivastava and Amit Sadh, in a special appearance, play pivotal roles.

The film marked the last production for Phantom Films before its quick disbandment and later revival under sole surviving partner Madhu Mantena. Principal photography began in January 2018 and wrapped in September 2018. It was released theatrically on 12 July 2019 to a positive critical reception, with Roshan's performance drawing particular praise. Grossing ₹208.93 crore worldwide, the film emerged as the 12th highest-grossing Hindi film of 2019.

== Plot ==
In the present day, Fugga delivers a keynote address in London. He credits his achievements to his former mentor, Patna-based mathematician Anand Kumar.

The narrative flashes back to Anand's youth in Bihar. Despite belonging to an underprivileged household, Anand possesses an extraordinary aptitude for mathematics. After winning a local competition, he catches the attention of the state education minister, Shriram Singh, who publicly pledges to support Anand's future educational endeavors. Seeking advanced academic material, Anand frequently smuggles himself into the library of Banaras Hindu University to read foreign mathematics journals. When the library supervisor bans him for lacking university credentials, a sympathetic staff member informs Anand that publishing an original solution in a prominent journal would earn him a free lifetime subscription. Anand successfully solves a notoriously complex problem and receives an admission offer from the University of Cambridge under Professor Richard.

Although his family celebrates the milestone, they lack the finances for his international travel. Anand and his father, Rajendra, a low-ranking postal clerk, appeal to Shriram Singh for the promised financial aid, but the minister dismisses them. Despite trying every avenue to gather funds, they fail. That night, Rajendra suffers a fatal heart attack driven by the stress. Devastated by his father's sudden death and the family's crushing financial debt, Anand reluctantly relinquishes his Cambridge seat.

To sustain his mother Jayanti and brother Pranav, Anand sells homemade papads on the streets. During a chance encounter, he is spotted by Lallan Singh, an influential entrepreneur who runs the upscale "Excellence Coaching Centre" under Shriram Singh's patronage. Recognizing Anand's genius, Lallan hires him as a premium faculty member. Anand’s dynamic teaching style brings him immense wealth and professional prestige. However, upon witnessing a bright, impoverished student forced to quit learning due to a lack of money, Anand experiences a crisis of conscience. Remembering his late father's belief that education belongs to those who earn it, not just those who can afford it, Anand abruptly resigns from Lallan's institute.

Anand establishes an independent, free academy for underprivileged children, selecting exactly thirty exceptionally bright students from impoverished backgrounds. This decision drives him into severe financial hardship and strains his relationship with his affluent love interest, Supriya. Despite the poverty, Anand and his family provide the students with free lodging and meals, while he trains them intensely using creative, practical, and highly engaging methods.

Anand’s growing reputation threatens Lallan's lucrative coaching empire. Lallan attempts to sabotage the program through financial bribery, but failing that, he challenges Anand to a public academic wager: a standardized exam pitting Lallan's elite students against Anand's cohort, with the losing academy agreeing to shut down permanently. Following the examination, Anand's students are devastated to learn their average score is lower. To humiliate Anand and force him to sign the closure papers, Lallan invites Supriya and her husband, Purshottam, an influential IAS officer. However, the legal contract vanishes mysteriously, allowing Anand to walk away. It is later revealed that Supriya covertly hid the documents, having quietly recognized the nobility of Anand’s mission.

Fearing that Anand's students will permanently dismantle his commercial business model if they clear the prestigious Indian Institute of Technology Joint Entrance Examination - Advanced (IIT JEE-Advanced), Shriram and Lallan resort to violence. Lallan’s henchmen ambush Anand, shooting and critically wounding him. While Anand fights for his life in the hospital, a second group of armed thugs attacks the makeshift academy. Relying on Anand’s parting advice to weaponize their knowledge, the students systematically coordinate scientific concepts, using makeshift chemical formulas, optics, and projectile physics, to incapacitate the attackers.

Anand successfully recovers from his injuries. A few months later, the results of the JEE-Advanced are declared, revealing that all thirty of Anand's students passed the highly competitive examination.

== Cast ==
- Hrithik Roshan as Anand Kumar, a successful mathematician who opens a program named Super 30 to teach 30 poor students for JEE Advanced examination
- Mrunal Thakur as Supriya Singh, a professional dancer, Anand's love interest
- Virendra Saxena as Rajendra Prasad Kumar, Anand and Pranav's father who dies after a heart attack when Anand misses a chance to join Cambridge University because he was poor.
- Nandish Sandhu as Pranav Kumar, Anand's brother who supports him in his work
- Aditya Srivastava as Lallan Singh, Shriram's evil assistant who used education only as a means of business.
- Sadhana Singh as Jayanti Kumar, Anand and Pranav's hardworking mother
- Pankaj Tripathi as Shriram Singh, local minister
- Vijay Varma as Fugga Kumar, one of Anand's students who recollects his teacher's life as a successful man in London.
- Amit Sadh as Raghunath Bharat, reporter
- Anud Singh Dhaka as Raghunath's aid
- Sharat Sonu as Haadim Malik, Shriram's secretary
- Manav Gohil as IAS Purushottam Singh, Supriya's husband
- Aayush Kumar Shukla as Vinod
- Rahul Raj as Kishore
- Dharmveer Jakhar as Social Activist
- Deepali Gautam as Kusum
- Ali Haji as Prithvi
- Rajesh Sharma as Bachchi
- Karishma Sharma in item number "Paisa"
- Vivek Jha as villager

== Production ==
Principal photography commenced in November 2017.South Indian Actress Sai Pallavi is first choice to play a lead opposite Hrithik Roshan in the film. She would be make her Bollywood debut but later replace by Mrunal Thakur. Mrunal Thakur was cast opposite Hrithik Roshan in the film. The film was shot at Ramnagar Fort; part of the fort was converted to look like the Super 30 institute. The film was also shot for ten days in Sambhar Lake Town which was shown as Kota, Rajasthan and Jaipur. A set was erected in Mumbai at the cost of ₹10 crore to recreate Patna city of Bihar to facilitate shooting. In second schedule of Varanasi shooting, the film was shot at Banaras Hindu University in the end of June 2018. This was the first Hindi film that the university allowed to be shot at its campus. Filming was completed in September 2018. Television actor Nandish Sandhu made his film debut in the film; he played Roshan's younger brother.

== Soundtrack ==
Super 30

Soundtrack album by Ajay–Atul
- Released: 4 June 2019
- Recorded: 2018–2019
- Genre: Feature film soundtrack
- Length: 20:19
- Language: Hindi
- Label: Zee Music Company
- Producer: Ajay–Atul

Ajay–Atul chronology
Zero (2018)	Super 30 (2019)	Panipat (2019)
External audio
- Official Audio Jukebox on YouTube

Ajay Atul composed the music for the film, replacing Bahl's norm composer Amit Trivedi and reuniting with Roshan after their successful stint in Agneepath, and lyrics are written by Amitabh Bhattacharya. Vipin Nair of The Hindu gave the soundtrack 3.5/5, calling it a "pretty engaging soundtrack". The Times of India based Debarati Sen, in her review, said the composers "do not fail to impress".

Track listing
No.	Title	Singer(s)	Length
1.	"Jugraafiya"	Udit Narayan, Shreya Ghoshal	4:34
2.	"Paisa"	Vishal Dadlani	3:52
3.	"Basanti No Dance"	Prem Areni, Janardan Dhatrak, Divya Kumar, Chaitally Parmar	5:04
4.	"Question Mark"	Hrithik Roshan	2:49
5.	"Niyam Ho"	Arohi Mhatre, Aditi Prabhudesai, Pragati Joshi, Maithili Panse, Sonal Naik, Rucha Soman, Deepti Rege, Deepanshi Nagar, Ann Fernandes, Dr. Pallavi Shyam Sundar, Shivika Rajesh, Riddhi Sampat, Kinjal Shah, Umesh Joshi, Vijay Dhuri, Mandar Pilvalkar, Vivek Naik, Rahul Chitnis, Saurabh Wakhare, Janardan Dhatrak, Gaurav Medatwal, Chaitanya Shinde, Abhishek Jhawar, Nimish Shah, Yash Kapoor, Mayukh Pareek	4:00
Total length:			20:19

== Marketing and release ==
The first look posters of Hrithik Roshan from Super 30 were unveiled on 5 September 2018 to coincide with the Teacher's Day in India. Second poster with new release date was revealed on 12 January 2019. Another look of Hrithik Roshan from the film unveiled in new poster on 2 June. The next day another poster with Roshan soaking in the rain of success with the motto "Misaal Bano, Haqdaar Bano" (Be an example, be qualified) was released. one day later on 4 June official trailer of the film was released by Reliance Entertainment. It garnered 44.99 million views since its release on YouTube.

During the MeToo movement in India in 2018, when Bahl was accused by a former Phantom employee of sexual assault during the promotions of Shaandaar, the ensuing controversy attracted an inquiry against Bahl and he was temporarily suspended from receipt of directorial credit; while Phantom's disbandment after the film's release was confirmed, reports initially stated that Kabir Khan, who was then helming the biographical sports drama 83 for Phantom and Nadiadwala Grandson Entertainment, would be onboarded to replace Bahl and complete parts of the film; Khan, however, denied these reports, and the inquiry cleared Bahl of charges pressed against him seven months later.

The film's producers reported that Hrithik Roshan will be accompanied by Anand Kumar for the promotion of Super 30.

The film was theatrically released in India on 12 July 2019, as the release date was advanced by fourteen days.

The film has been certified with a runtime of 155 mins by British Board of Film Classification and was released on 12 July 2019.

== Reception ==
=== Critical response ===
The film received positive reviews from critics.

Sreeparna Sengupta of The Times of India gave the film three and a half stars out of five, and praised Hrithik Roshan, Pankaj Tripathi, Aditya Srivastava and cinematography of Anay Goswami. She felt that Super 30 conveyed the message that though education is the privilege of people with good economic background, if given the level field others too can shine equally. Concluding, she wrote "While the narrative does have its flaws, Super 30 is a human drama and the story of a teacher who triumphs over the many challenges that life throws at him, to set an example for the world to see. Just for that it’s worth a watch." Writing for the NDTV Saibal Chatterjee, rated it with two stars out of five and felt that erratic screenplay of Super 30 had 'skimmed the surface of a massive mound of tangled issues', and that Hrithik Roshan was miscast as Anand Kumar. He opined that the major problem with the film was telling a true story, which was not convincing. He concluded the review as, "The idea to bronze up Hrithik Roshan so that he can impersonate Anand Kumar is anything but super: it is a formula that equals zero." Samrudhi Ghosh of India Today rated it with two and a half stars out of five, but praised the performances of Pankaj Tripathi and Aditya Srivastava. Ghosh felt the film was lengthy and had aroused the dramatics without need, saying "Under the guidance of math wizard Anand Kumar, his Super 30 turned out to be miracles. Under the guidance of Vikas Bahl, Hrithik Roshan's Super 30 is far from one."

Priyanka Sinha Jha of News18, disagreeing with Ghosh praises Roshan and ensemble of Pankaj Tripathi, Virendra Saxena, Nandish Sandhu and Aditya Srivastav for their performances. She feels that Roshan has given an admirable performance. Agreeing with Sengupta she opines that education is a means to a better life, but is a privilege in itself, and that is what the film questions and challenges. She rates the film with three stars out of five, and concludes, "After all, as the famous saying goes—"Not all superheroes wear capes." Super 30 is the story of one such.." Shubhra Gupta of The Indian Express gave two stars out of five and termed the film 'way less than super', she opined that if handled in right way, it would have been a 'rousing, goosebumps-inducing, cheer-athon.' She summarised by stating, "Yes, the real-life story is inspiring. But the telling of it is a drag. The film has its moments, which belong mostly to its young people: the kids are all right."

=== Box office ===
Super 30 collected ₹11.83 crore from India, and ₹6.18 crore from overseas on the opening day. Next day (Saturday) showing upward trend the film collected ₹18.19 crore from India, and ₹5.46 crore from overseas. The film grossed ₹75.08 crore in the opening weekend, and ₹112.65 crore in the opening week worldwide.

As of 14 August 2019, with gross of ₹172.84 crore from India and ₹36.09 crore from overseas, the film has grossed ₹208.93 crore worldwide. The film entered the 100 crore club on 21 July 2019.

== Awards and nominations ==
Award	Date of the ceremony	Category	Recipient(s)	Result	Ref.
Filmfare Awards	15 February 2020	Best Actor	Hrithik Roshan	Nominated	
Filmfare Awards	15 February 2020	Best Dialogue	Sanjiv Dutta	Nominated	
Filmfare Awards	15 February 2020	Best Choreography	Ganesh Acharya for "Basanti No Dance"	Nominated	
International Indian Film Academy Awards	24 November 2021	Best Actor	Hrithik Roshan	Nominated	
International Indian Film Academy Awards	24 November 2021	Best Story	Sanjiv Dutta	Nominated	
Mirchi Music Awards	19 February 2020	Best Background Score	Ajay–Atul	Nominated	
Mirchi Music Awards	19 February 2020	Best Song Producer - Programming & Arranging	Ajay–Atul	Nominated	
Mirchi Music Awards	19 February 2020	Best Song Engineer (Recording & Mixing)	Vijay Dayal	Won	
Nickelodeon Kids' Choice Awards India	21 December 2019	Favorite Movie	Super 30	Nominated	
Zee Cine Awards	13 March 2020	Best Film	Super 30	Nominated	
Zee Cine Awards	13 March 2020	Best Actor	Hrithik Roshan	Won	
