= Foundation for Excellence in Education =

American education think tank

Coordinates: 30.4401°N 84.2803°W

- Logo of the Foundation for Excellence in Education
- Established: 2007
- Chair: Condoleezza Rice
- Executive Director: Patricia Levesque
- Budget: Revenue: $11,884,963; Expenses: $12,608,835 (FYE December 2014)
- Address: 215 South Monroe Street, Tallahassee, Florida 32301
- Website: www.excelined.org

The Foundation for Excellence in Education is a non-profit think tank on education reform based in Tallahassee, Florida.

== History ==
The foundation was established by Jeb Bush, shortly after his tenure as Governor of Florida from 1999 to 2007.

The education reform policies suggested by the foundation have influenced Mitch Daniels, the former Republican Governor of Indiana, now President of Purdue University. Nicky Morgan, the British Secretary of State for Education, spoke at the 2014 Foundation for Excellence in Education Summit on November 20, 2014.

Former US Secretary of State Condoleezza Rice served as its Chairman beginning in January 2015. Currently, former Governor Jeb Bush serves as chairman and former House Majority Leader Eric Cantor serves as Vice Chairman.

It has received donations from Bill Gates, Michael Bloomberg and Eli Broad, as well as Connections Education, a subsidiary of Pearson PLC, and Amplify, a subsidiary of NewsCorp.
