= The Shaukeens =

2014 film by Abhishek Sharma

- Theatrical release poster
- Directed by: Abhishek Sharma
- Written by: Tigmanshu Dhulia; Sai Kabir
- Based on: Shaukeen by Basu Chatterjee
- Produced by: Ashwin Varde; Murad Khetani
- Starring: Anupam Kher; Annu Kapoor; Piyush Mishra; Lisa Haydon
- Cinematography: Amalendu Chaudhary
- Edited by: Rameshwar S. Bhagat
- Music by: Sandeep Chowta
- Production companies: Cine1 Studios; Cape of Good Films; Ashwin Varde Productions
- Distributed by: AA Films
- Release date: 7 November 2014
- Running time: 117 minutes
- Country: India
- Language: Hindi
- Budget: ₹46.30 crore
- Box office: est. ₹46.3 crore

The Shaukeens (transl. The enthusiasts) is a 2014 Indian Hindi-language comedy film directed by Abhishek Sharma. A remake of the 1982 film Shoukheen directed by Basu Chatterjee and starring Ashok Kumar, Utpal Dutt, A. K. Hangal, Rati Agnihotri, and Mithun Chakraborty, the film stars Anupam Kher, Annu Kapoor, Piyush Mishra, and Lisa Haydon in the lead roles, while Akshay Kumar is a fictionalized version of himself in an extended cameo. Agnihotri plays a different, supporting role as the only actress to appear in both films, while Suparna Marwah, Gaurav Gera, Subrat Dutta and Manoj Joshi star in additional roles.

Partly shot in Mauritius, The Shaukeens was released on 7 November 2014.

== Plot ==
The film revolves around three elderly men. Ashok "Lali" Lalwani is not happy with his wife, who is a staunch believer of God and doesn't spend time with her. Kamaldheer "KD" Sharma has remained unmarried for undisclosed reason, while Harishankar "Pinky" Goyal is secretly in love with a young Chinese woman, who only knows English but he himself being uneducated, is unable to express his feelings. The three men plan a holiday to Mauritius to have some fun, where they meet Ahana Bakshi, who is a social media addict and gets annoyed because her rival influencers have more Facebook likes and her ex-boyfriend has been commenting and liking their posts and condemning her at the same time.

The three men try to seduce her by pretending to like her collections made from weird things like animal body parts. However, her Facebook obsession reaches heights and Ahana decides to commit suicide, but is interrupted when she sees her idol, Rajiv Bhatia a.k.a. Akshay Kumar, shooting for a song nearby. She tells the three men that she is a huge fan of Akshay and wishes to meet him. The three men try to get her to meet Akshay, much to his annoyance. Meanwhile, Akshay is revealed to be secretly an alcoholic. He agrees to work with Ranjit Basu, a filmmaker, who is well known for his films earning more than ₹3 billion and National Awards, since working with him would make Akshay a better competitor to other superstars, and also earn him a National Award. However, Basu occasionally tells him that he's not able to get into the character. The frustration of not getting into the required character and drinking too much alcohol causes Akshay to burst out in front of the public and the media on Pinky, who says that Ahana had promised sex if he got her to meet Akshay. Akshay publicly humiliates the three men and Ahana, by calling them perverts and slut shaming Ahana. But this, however, backfires on him as he is a public figure. Moreover, he realises his mistake when Lali's wife blames KD and Pinky for this.

This time, Akshay visits just as the three men are about to leave, and asks them to forgive him and meets Ahana to apologise to her. It is revealed that KD remained a bachelor because he loved Lali's younger sister, who is a divorcee but KD didn't want this to ruin his friendship with Lali. Akshay tells Ahana that to rectify his mistake, he has kept a conference, and that he intends to correct their public image. He tells the media in the press conference that he is working in a film Alcoholic, and what he did earlier was a promotional strategy and Lali, KD and Pinky are his uncles. He also says that Ahana is the new heroine of the film. While the three men happily leave for India, Akshay finds himself even more frustrated, when he isn't able to get a good shot from Ahana, although he somehow manages to shoot the title track.

== Cast ==
- Anupam Kher as Ashok "Lali" Lalwani
- Annu Kapoor as Kamaldheer "KD" Sharma
- Piyush Mishra as Harishankar "Pinky" Goyal
- Lisa Haydon as Ahana Bakshi
- Akshay Kumar plays a fictionalized version of himself in an extended cameo appearance
- Rati Agnihotri as Mrs. Lalwani
- Suparna Marwah as Lali's younger sister
- Manoj Joshi as Akshay's manager
- Kavin Dave as a spotboy
- Gaurav Gera as Bhanu
- Vandita Shrivastava as Escort
- Subrat Dutta as Ranjit Basu
- Amy Maghera in a special appearance in the song "Meherbani"
- Rajni Basumatary as Angie (Angela)
- Abhishek Bachchan (Cameo)
- Dimple Kapadia (Cameo)
- Kareena Kapoor Khan (Cameo)
- Suniel Shetty (Cameo)

== Production ==
The shooting of the film started on 25 April 2014 in Cape Town, South Africa. The indoor scenes were shot in a hotel room. Next schedule of filming started in Mauritius in early May 2014. The next schedule began in Delhi in May itself. Anupam Kher twitted that he was going to Delhi for outdoor shooting in Delhi on 11 May 2014. Last schedule was shot in Cape Town in August 2014.

Musical artist Honey Singh was signed for a song in the film. Singh has earlier collaborated with Akshay Kumar a few times, and on his request to the rapper-performer for one special number for the film, Singh offered him three songs for the film.

Initially, Nargis Fakhri was signed for the film but when she left the project for a Hollywood film, Spy the role was offered to Shraddha Kapoor. The part was finally offered to Lisa Haydon who accepted it. It was her first solo heroine film. Akshay Kumar was signed to play partner of Ahana played by Haydon, a role which Mithun Chakraborty had portrayed in the original film.

== Soundtrack ==
The songs in the film are composed by Yo Yo Honey Singh, Arko, Hard Kaur & Vikram Negi. The film score is composed by Sandeep Chowta.

No.	Title	Lyrics	Music	Singer(s)	Length
1.	"Alcoholic"	Lil Golu , Honey Singh	Yo Yo Honey Singh	Yo Yo Honey Singh	3:20
2.	"Meherbani"		Arko	Jubin Nautiyal	4:04
3.	"Manali Trance"	Sahill Kaushal And Neha Kakkar	Yo Yo Honey Singh	Neha Kakkar, Lil Golu	3:23
4.	"Aashiq Mizaaj"		Hard Kaur	Aman Trikha	3:46
5.	"Ishq Kutta Hai"		Vikram Negi	Mika Singh	4:44
6.	"Lonely"		Vikram Negi	Anu Malik	3:04

== Box office ==
The Shaukeens collected ₹324 million (US$3.5 million) from the domestic box office.
