= Hamari Bahu Alka =

- Directed by: Basu Chatterjee
- Screenplay by: Basu Chatterjee
- Story by: Manoj Basu
- Produced by: Shyamsunder Seksaria
- Starring: Rakesh Roshan; Bindiya Goswami
- Cinematography: A. K. Bir
- Edited by: V.N. Mayekar
- Music by: Rajesh Roshan
- Production company: Anuradha Films
- Release date: 12 January 1982
- Country: India
- Language: Hindi

Hamari Bahu Alka (transl. Our Daughter-in-Law Alka) is a 1982 Hindi movie, directed by Basu Chatterjee, based on the Bengali story Eto Tuku Basha by Manoj Basu. It stars Rakesh Roshan, Bindiya Goswami and Utpal Dutt. Music was by Rajesh Roshan, and it had the first solo song for Alka Yagnik.

== Plot ==
Collegian Pratapchand alias Pratap lives with his father, Badriprasad, a building contractor, his housewife mom, and a younger brother named Ramu. Badriprasad is always critical of Pratap, and never a day passes without Pratap being reminded of his shortcomings. When Pratap's friend, Sunil marries Sudha, Badriprasad arranges Pratap's marriage with a village belle named Alka, much to Pratap's chagrin. After the marriage takes place, Pratap finds Alka attractive, and both fall in love with each other, and would like some time together. But that is not to be so, as Pratap has exams coming up, and Badriprasad will not permit them to be close to each other. So both of them scheme up a plot to leave on the pretext of visiting Alka's parents in another distant town. Instead, both of them go to Bombay, rent a room, and decide to be intimate. But fate has other plans, rather comical, for them, and will make them rue their decision of coming to Bombay.

== Cast ==
- Rakesh Roshan as Pratapchand
- Bindiya Goswami as Alka
- Utpal Dutt as Badriprasad
- Asrani as Sunil
- Prema Narayan as Sudha
- Sudha Shivpuri as Mrs. Badriprasad
- Master Raju as Ramu
- Ranjeet Sood
- Manmauji
- Viju Khote
- Meena Pankaj
- Lakshmi Patel
- Meghdoot

== Music ==
1. "Prem Ki Hai Kya Sun Paribhasha" – Kishore Kumar
2. "Pakka Jamun Todo Nahi, Mere Ped Par Chado Nahi" – Penaz Masani, Alka Yagnik
3. "Ab Toh Apna Hotel Hi Sasural" – Shailendra Singh, Usha Mangeshkar, Penaz Masani, Amit Kumar
4. "Soona Soona Ghar" – Lata Mangeshkar
5. "Hum Tum Rahenge Akele" – Amit Kumar, Alka Yagnik
