= Yogesh (lyricist) =

Indian lyricist (1943–2020)

Yogesh Gaur
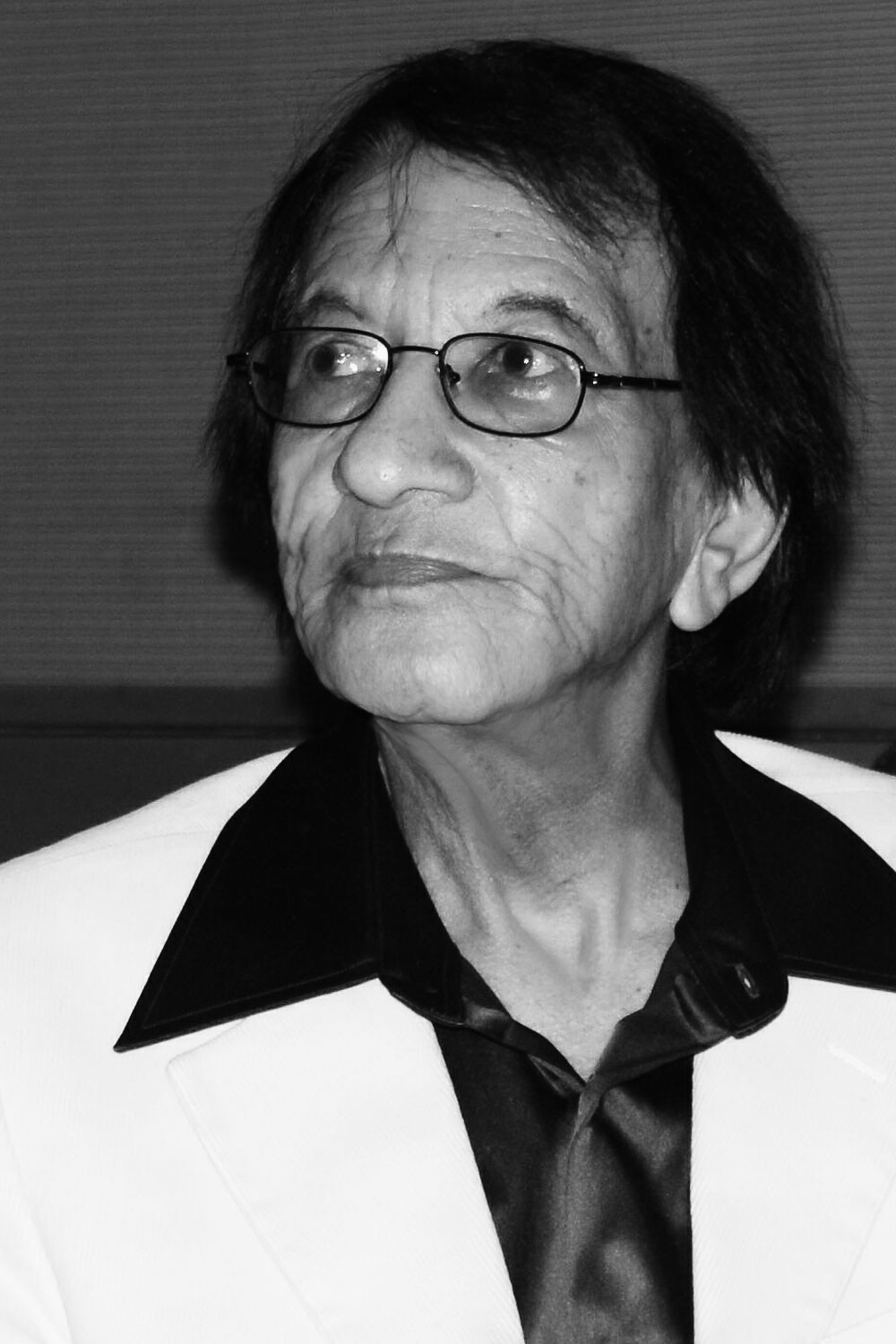
- Born: Yogesh Gaur; 19 March 1943; Lucknow, Uttar Pradesh, India
- Died: 29 May 2020 (aged 77); Vasai, Mumbai, India
- Occupation: Writer

Yogesh Gaur, or Gaud commonly credited as Yogesh, (March 19, 1943 – May 29, 2020), was an Indian writer and lyricist. He was known for his contributions to Bollywood, and possibly his best known works came from the film Anand, songs including Kahin Door Jab Din Dal Jaaye and Zindagi Kaisi Hai Paheli (1971), and also Rajnigandha phool tumhare from the movie Rajnigandha (1974).

== Life ==
Yogesh was born on 19 March 1943 in Lucknow, Uttar Pradesh. He moved to Bombay at the age of 16 looking for work and sought the help of his cousin Yogendra Gaur, who was a screenplay writer. During his struggle days, he even acted as an extra in the hit mythological film Chakradhari starring Trilok Kapoor and Nirupa Roy. His first break was in 1962, when he wrote six songs for the Bollywood movie Sakhi Robin , including the song "Tum jo aao to pyaar aa jaaye", which was sung by Manna Dey. The song launched his career in Bollywood. He worked with some of India's finest directors like Hrishikesh Mukherjee and Basu Chatterjee. His famous Hindi songs include Kahin Door Jab Din Dal Jaaye, Zindagi Kaisi Hai Paheli, Rimjhim gire Saawan, Kai baar yunhi dekha hai and Rajnigandha phool tumhari from Rajnigandha and Na bole tum na maine kuch kaha from Baaton Baaton Mein. Yogesh also worked in television serials as a writer.

== Death ==
Yogesh Gaur died in Mumbai on 29 May 2020.

== Filmography (partial) ==
- Ek Raat
- Sakhi Robin (1962)
- Anand (1971)
- Annadata (1972)
- Anokha Daan (1972)
- Mere Bhaiya (1972)
- Us Paar (1974)
- Manzilein Aur Bhi Hain (1974)
- Rajnigandha (1974)
- Mili (1975)
- Mazaaq (1975)
- Chhoti Si Baat (1976)
- Priyatama (1977)
- Dillagi (1978)
- Hamare Tumhare (1979)
- Baaton Baaton Mein (1979)
- Manzil (1979)
- Jeena Yahan (1979)
- Anand Mahal
- Apne Paraye (1980)
- Kirayedaar
- Shaukeen (1982)
- Pasand Apni Apni (1983)
- Lakhon Ki Baat (1984)
- Honeymoon (1992)
- Sooraj Mukhi (1992)
- Aaja Meri Jaan (1993)
- Chor Aur Chaand (1993)
- Kuhaasa
- Bewafa Sanam (1995)
- Apne Dam Par (1996)
- Sssshhh... (2003)
- Angrezi Mein Kehte Hain (2018)
