= Rang Birangi =

- Directed by: Hrishikesh Mukherjee
- Written by: Ashok Rawat (dialogue)
- Screenplay by: Hrishikesh Mukherjee
- Story by: Kamleshwar
- Produced by: Rajeev Pandya; Rajvi Pictures
- Starring: Parveen Babi; Amol Palekar; Farooque Shaikh; Deepti Naval; Utpal Dutt
- Cinematography: Jaywant Pathare
- Edited by: Khan Zaman Khan
- Music by: R.D.Burman
- Release date: 23 April 1983
- Running time: 180 minutes
- Country: India
- Language: Hindi

Rang Birangi (colorful) is a 1983 Hindi film, based on a story by the Hindi writer Kamleshwar, and directed by Hrishikesh Mukherjee. This comedy classic is most remembered for the Utpal Dutt's role of ACP Dhurandhar Bhatawdekar, which won him the Filmfare Best Comedian Award for the year.

== Synopsis ==
Ajay Sharma is a very successful entrepreneur who has now transformed into a workaholic and is seen ignoring his wife of seven years, Nirmala. Enter Ravi Kapoor, a friend of Ajay who notices Nirmala's loneliness and decides to fix things by rekindling the spark in their life. Thus starts a hilarious comedy involving Ajay's secretary, Anita, and her boyfriend, Jeet.

== Cast ==
- Amol Palekar as Ajay Sharma
- Parveen Babi as Nirmala Sharma
- Farooque Shaikh as Professor Jeet Saxena
- Deepti Naval as Anita Sood
- Utpal Dutt as Police Inspector Dhurandhar Bhatawdekar
- Deven Verma as Ravi Kapoor
- Javed Khan
- Om Prakash as Retired Judge
- Chhaya Devi as Mrs. Banerjee
- Raj Babbar as Himself (Guest appearance)
- Bindiya Goswami as Herself (Guest appearance)
- Amol Sen as Havaldar
- Poonam as Neema's sister

== Soundtrack ==
All music is composed by Rahul Dev Burman.

Songs
No.	Title	Lyrics	Singers	Length
1.	"Duniyaa Rang Birangee Bhaiye"	Kaka Hathrasi	Manna Dey
2.	"O Mriganayanee Chandramukhee"	Yogesh	Dr. Vasantrao Deshpande, Faiyaz
3.	"Kabhi Kuchh Pal Jeevan ke"	Yogesh	Anuradha Paudwal, Aarti Mukherjee
4.	"Pyaar Karegaa Tujhe Pyaar"	Maya Govind	Sapan Chakraborty

== Awards ==
Year	Nominee / work	Award	Result
1984	Utpal Dutt	Filmfare Award for Best Performance in a Comic Role	Won
