= Raees (1976 film) =

- Directed by: Vishu Raje
- Written by: Vishwamitra Adil; Vijay Tendulkar
- Story by: Vijay Tendulkar
- Produced by: Jashmendar Singh
- Starring: Yogeeta Bali; Kiran Kumar; A.K. Hangal; Utpal Dutt; Yogesh Raje
- Cinematography: Narayan Rao
- Edited by: B S Glaad
- Music by: Sapan Jagmohan
- Release date: 12 December 1976 (India)
- Running time: 3181.63 Mts
- Country: India
- Language: Hindi

Raees (Hindi: धनी, English: Penance) is a 1976 Indian Hindi-language drama film produced by Jashmendar Singh. The film is directed by Vishu Raje. The film stars Yogeeta Bali, Kiran Kumar, A.K. Hangal, Utpal Dutt. The film's music is by Sapan Jagmohan. The film was released on 12 December 1976.

== Plot ==
Story of poor orphaned youth, who agreed rich man's daughter to marry with him, Ramesh the millionaire son who tries his best to console his family members to marry with Radha against her husband but Radha knows the greatness of her husband Kanhaiya, she left her house with her husband and child to live their own lives.

== Cast ==
- Yogeeta Bali
- Kiran Kumar
- A. K. Hangal
- Utpal Dutt
- Ruby Myers
- Gulshan Arora
- Ramesh Deo
- Helen
- Aruna Irani

== Crew ==
- Director - Vishu Raje
- Producer - Jashmendar Singh
- Production Company -
- Story - Vijay Tendulkar
- Writer - Vishwamitra Adil Vijay Tendulkar
- Dialogue - Vishwamitra Adil
- Editor - B S Glaad
- Cinematographer - Narayan Rao
- Art Director - Gurdayal Singh
- Costume Designer - Mino Rabadi, Super Tailors
- Choreographer - Kamal, Badoor
- Studio - Kamera Arts

== Music ==
All lyrics are written by Naqsh Llayalpuri; all music is composed by Sapan Jagmohan.

Songs
No.	Title	Playback	Length
1.	"Duniya Me Kya Kya Hota Hai Pyare"	Kishore Kumar
2.	"Ae Munne Raja Ae Munne Pyare"	Lata Mangeshkar
3.	"Tere Zurm Ki Maut Hai Saza"	Asha Bhosle
4.	"Mauka Yeh kho Na Dena Ae Dil Tu Aaj Raat Bhar"	Asha Bhosle
