= A. K. Hangal =

Indian freedom fighter and actor (1914–2012)

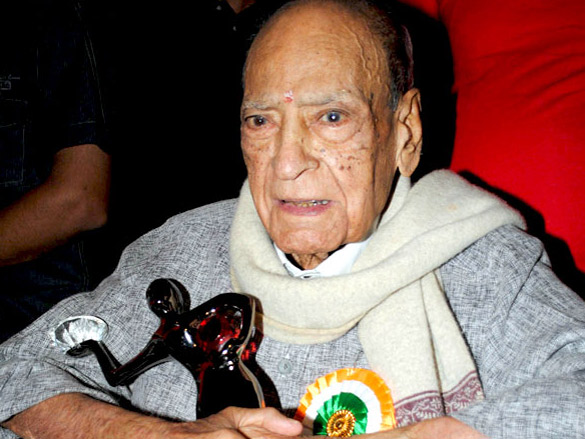
- Hangal in 2011
- Born: Avtar Kishan Hangal; 1 February 1914; Sialkot, Punjab, British India (Present Day Punjab, Pakistan)
- Died: 26 August 2012 (aged 98); Mumbai, Maharashtra, India
- Other name: Padmabhushan Avtar Krishna Hangal
- Occupation: Actor
- Years active: 1929–1947 (freedom fighter), 1936–2012 (actor)
- Notable work: Ram Shastri in Aaina; Inder Sen in Shaukeen; Imaam Saa'b in Sholay; Bipinlal Pandey in Namak Haraam; Brinda Kaka in Aandhi
- Children: 1

Avtar Kishan Hangal (1 February 1914 – 26 August 2012) was an Indian freedom fighter and actor. His most notable roles are as Ram Shastri in Aaina (1977), as Inder Sen in Shaukeen, as Bipinlal Pandey in Namak Haraam, as Imaam Saa'b in Sholay, as Anokhelal in Manzil and the antagonist in Prem Bandhan and the 16 films he did with Rajesh Khanna. He has acted in around 225 Hindi films in a career spanning from 1966 to 2005.

== Early life ==
Avtar Kishan Hangal was born in Sialkot in the Punjab Province of British India (now in Punjab, Pakistan) into a Kashmiri Pandit family. He spent his childhood and youth in Peshawar, North-West Frontier Province where he had performed in theatre for some major roles. His family home was inside Reti Gate as mentioned in his memoirs. His father's name was Pandit Hari Kishan Hangal. His mother's name was Ragia Hundoo. He had two sisters. Bishan and Kishan. He was married to Manorma Dar from Agra.

Hangal started his career as a tailor in Peshawar. Along with that he was an active participant in the Indian freedom struggle from 1929 to 1947. He joined Shree Sangeet Priya Mandal, a theatre group in Peshawar in 1936 and continued to act in many plays in undivided India till 1946. Following his father's retirement, the family moved from Peshawar to Karachi. He was jailed in Karachi because he was a communist for two years from 1947 to 1949. After his release, he moved to India and settled in Mumbai. Once in Mumbai, He was involved with the theatre group IPTA along with Balraj Sahni and Kaifi Azmi, both of whom had Marxist leanings. He later acted in many plays in theatres in India from 1949 to 1965.

== Hindi cinema career ==
He started his Hindi film career at the age of 52 with Basu Bhattacharya's Teesri Kasam in 1966 and Shagird, and went on to play as the man of principles playing the on-screen father or uncle of the leading men/women in the films in the 1970s, 1980s and 1990s, or sometimes the quintessential meek and oppressed old man. His pivotal roles in the films such as Sholay, Arjun, Heer Raanjha, Namak Haraam, Shaukeen (1981), Aaina (1974), Avtaar, Aandhi, Tapasya, Kora Kagaz, Bawarchi, Chhupa Rustam, Chitchor, Balika Badhu, Guddi and Naram Garam are considered to be among his best. He, as a character actor was part of 16 films with Rajesh Khanna as the lead hero, like Aap Ki Kasam, Amar Deep, Naukri, Prem Bandhan, Thodisi Bewafaii, Phir Wohi Raat, Kudrat, Aaj Ka M.L.A. Ram Avtar, Bewafai until Sautela Bhai in 1996. His best performances in his later years was in Shararat (2002) his character roles in Tere Mere Sapne (1997) and Lagaan. In movies he has played a very large number of character roles, mostly positive, with rare exceptions where his negative roles became famous, like in Manzil and Prem Bandhan. He also acted in a NFDC film, DATTAK (The Adopted), directed by Gul Bahar Singh in 2001. Producer Debika Mitra had signed Madan Puri for Inder Sen's role, but a friend advised that A. K. Hangal would be a better choice. The superlative performance went on to become one of the most cherished acts of Hangal.

On 8 February 2011, Hangal 'walked' the ramp in a wheelchair for fashion designer Riyaz Ganji for his summer line in Mumbai.

Hangal made his last appearance in the television series Madhubala – Ek Ishq Ek Junoon in May 2012, in which he had a cameo. Madhubala – Ek Ishq Ek Junoon was a tribute to 100 years of Indian cinema. The episode that featured Hangal aired on 1 June at 22:00 on Colors. In the early 2012, Hangal also gave his voice for the character of King Ugrasen in the animation film Krishna Aur Kans which was released on 3 August 2012. This was final work in his career before his death. His portrayal of Ugrasen was much appreciated by critics.

== Awards ==
The government of India awarded him the Padma Bhushan for his contribution to Hindi Cinema in 2006.

== Freedom fighter ==
Hangal participated in the Indian freedom movement when as a student, he joined protests in the North West Frontier Province against the massacre at Jallianwala Bagh. He later moved to Karachi, where he spent three years in prison for protesting against British rule.

== Death ==
Hangal was admitted to the Asha Parekh Hospital in Santa Cruz, Mumbai on 16 August 2012, three days after he fractured his thigh bone from a fall in his bathroom. His son said that he went to the hospital as he had "suffered a back injury and had to undergo a surgery. But that could not take place as later it was found that he has chest and breathing problems." On 26 August, he was put on life support. Dr Vinod Khanna, an orthopaedic surgeon at the hospital said: "He is on life support system. One of his lungs is not functioning. He is also having respiratory problems." But, his condition worsened and he died on the same day, at the age of 98. His cremation was held the next afternoon at Pavan Hans crematorium.

In reaction to his death, Shabana Azmi wrote on Twitter: "An era comes to an end. Theatre and film were enriched by him." The Communist Party of India described Hangal as a committed social and political activist who withstood the Shiv Sena onslaught. The BJP's L. K. Advani and Nitin Gadkari also condoled his death.

== Filmography ==
=== Films ===
Year	Title	Role	Notes
1966	Teesri Kasam	Raj Kapoor's elder brother	
1967	Shagird	Kedarnath Badri Narayan	
1968	Bambai Raat Ki Bahon Mein	Sonadas Doleria	
1969	Saat Hindustani	Doctor	
1969	Sara Akash	Mr. Thakur	
1969	Dharti Kahe Pukarke		
1970	Heer Raanjha	Court Maulvi	
1971	Guddi	Guddi's father	
1971	Nadaan	Seema's father	
1971	Anubhav	Hari	
1971	Mere Apne	College Principal	
1972	Bawarchi	Ramnath Sharma (Munna)	
1972	Jawani Diwani	College Principal	
1972	Parichay	Ravi's maternal uncle	
1973	Daag: A Poem of Love	Prosecuting Attorney / Judge	
1973	Chhupa Rustam	Professor Harbanslal	
1973	Rocky Mera Naam	Reeta's Father	
1973	Abhimaan	Sadanand	
1973	Joshila	Lala Gulzarilal	
1973	Namak Haraam	Bipinlal Pandey	
1973	Sweekar	Dr. Verma	
1973	Heera Panna	Diwan Karan Singh	
1973	Anamika	Shiv Prasad	
1973	Garm Hava	Ajmani Sahab	
1974	Nirmaan	Advocate	
1974	Aap Ki Kasam	Kamal's Father	
1974	Do Nambar Ke Amir	Devakinandan Sharma	
1974	Kora Kagaz	Principal Gupta	
1974	Doosri Sita	Masterji - Babulal Wagle	
1974	Trimurti	Jagannath	
1974	Bidaai	Ramsharan	
1974	Us Paar	Mohan's father	
1974	Ishq Ishq Ishq	Guruji	
1974	Garm Hava		
1975	Deewaar	Chander's Father	
1975	Aandhi	Brinda kaka	
1975	Anokha	Hridaynath	
1975	Sholay	Imaam Saheb / Rahim Chacha	
1975	Salaakhen	Ram Lal	
1976	Zid		
1976	Sankoch	Gurucharan	
1976	Balika Badhu	Masterji	
1976	Zindagi	Doctor	
1976	Tapasya	Chandranath Sinha	
1976	Raees		
1976	Mera Jiwan	Medical college dean	
1976	Jeevan Jyoti	Raja Kamlakar	
1976	Chitchor	Pitamber Choudhry	
1976	Aaj Ka Ye Ghar	Dinanath	
1977	Immaan Dharam	Masterji	
1977	Aaina	Ram Shastri	
1977	Alaap	Pandit Jamuna Prasad	Guest Appearance
1977	Mukti	Colonel	
1977	Chala Murari Hero Banne	Murari's Father	
1977	Paheli	Masterji	
1977	Kalabaaz	Poojary	
1977	Aafat		
1978	Jogi		
1978	Badalte Rishtey	Professor	
1978	Satyam Shivam Sundaram: Love Sublime	Bansi	
1978	Besharam	Ramchandra	
1978	Naukri	Ranjit's Father	
1978	Des Pardes	Pujari	
1978	Tumhare Liye	Bhavani	
1978	Swarg Narak	Geeta's Father	
1978	Chakravyuha	Nandita's Father	
1979	Prem Bandhan		
1979	Inspector Eagle	Anthony Pinto	
1979	Jurmana	Pandit Prabhakar Chaturvedi / Nandlal's Mamaji	
1979	Meera	Saint Raidas	Uncredited
1979	Khandaan	Masterji	
1979	Manzil	Anokhelal	
1979	Ladke Baap Se Badke	Principal of St. Andrew's High School	
1979	Zulm Ki Pukar		
1979	Ratnadeep		
1979	Amar Deep	Ramu kaka	
1980	Kali Ghata	Deewaan	
1980	Kashish	Ramesh's father	
1980	Thodisi Bewafaii	Arvind Kumar Choudhary	
1980	Phir Wohi Raat	Vishwanath	
1980	Neeyat	Dinanath	
1980	Humkadam	Raghunath Gupta	
1980	Hum Paanch	Pandit	
1980	Judaai	Narayan Singh	
1981	Krodhi	Masterji	
1981	Naram Garam	Vishnuprasad / Masterji	
1981	Kalyug	Bhisham Chand	
1981	Kudrat	Billi Ram	
1981	Baseraa	Sharda's father	
1981	Kahani Ek Chor Ki		
1981	Nai Imarat	Pyarelal	
1981	Kal Hamara Hai		
1981	Bhaaya		
1982	Saath Saath	Professor Chaudhary	
1982	Shriman Shrimati	Vishwanath Gupta	
1982	Bemisal	Dr. Ramnarayan Goyal	Guest Appearance
1982	Shoukheeen	Inder Sen / Anderson	
1982	Dil... Akhir Dil Hai	Ashok Mehta	
1982	Khud-Daar	Rahim Chacha	
1982	Star	Mr. Verma	
1982	Swami Dada	Swami Satyanand	
1983	Suzanne		
1983	Avtaar	Rashid Ahmed	
1983	Naukar Biwi Ka	Sharma	
1984	Sardaar	Baba	
1984	Aaj Ka M.L.A. Ram Avtar	Tripathi	
1984	Sharaabi	Meena's Blind Father	
1984	Alcoholic	Meena's Blind Father	
1984	Yaadon Ki Zanjeer	ShambhuNath	
1984	Kamla	Kakasaab	
1984	Kahan Tak Aasmaan Hai		
1984	Bandh Honth		
1985	Saaheb	Doctor	
1985	Pighalta Aasman	Masterji	
1985	Arjun	Mr. Malvankar	
1985	Bewafai	Harihar Nath	
1985	Ram Teri Ganga Maili	Brij Kishore	
1985	Surkhiyaan (The Headlines)	Shera's father	
1985	Saagar	Baba	(in the lighthouse)
1985	Meri Jung	Advocate Gupta	
1986	Ek Chadar Maili Si	Hazur Singh	
1986	Waapsi		
1986	New Delhi Times	Vikas' father	
1987	Su-Raaj		
1987	Jalwa	Jojo's father	
1987	Dacait	Bighu chacha	
1987	Satyamev Jayate	Mr. Shastri	
1987	Sindoor	Pandit	Uncredited
1987	Jaan Hatheli Pe		
1987	Mera Yaar Mera Dushman	Raj Narayan Singh	
1987	Jaago Hua Savera		
1988	Khoon Bhari Maang	Ramu kaka	
1988	Aakhri Adaalat	Retired Judge Kapoor	
1989	Apne Begaane		
1989	Ilaaka	Vidya's father	
1989	Abhimanyu	Shyam Lal	
1989	Mamata Ki Chhaon Mein	Acharya	
1990	Police Public	Ram Swarup	
1991	Farishtay	Abdul	
1991	Dushman Devta	Suraj's Father	
1992	Meera Ka Mohan	Pujari	
1992	Apradhi	Vishembar Nath	
1992	Laat Saab	Dinanath / D'Mello	
1993	Roop Ki Rani Choron Ka Raja		
1993	Khalnayak	Shaukat Bhai	
1993	Jaagruti	Raghunath	
1994	Dilwale	Inmate	
1995	Ghar Ka Kanoon		
1995	Live Today		
1995	Kismat	Nanaji	
1996	Sautela Bhai	Bindiya's maternal grandfather	
1996	Tere Mere Sapne	Dattabhau	
1998	Zor: Never Underestimate the Force		
1998	Main Solah Baras Ki		
1998	Yeh Aashiqui Meri	Mr. Joshi	
1999	Thakshak	Homeless teacher	
2001	Lagaan: Once Upon a Time in India	Shambu kaka	
2001	Dattak The Adopted	Babu ji	
2002	Shararat	Gajanan Desai	
2003	Kahan Ho Tum	Ghanshyamji	
2004	Dil Maange More	Himself	
2004	Hari Om	Old Man	
2005	Sab Kuch Hai Kuch Bhi Nahin	Narayan Prasad	
2005	Paheli	Jeevraj	
2005	Mr Prime Minister		
2008	Humsey Hai Jahaan	Mr. Wild West	
2012	Krishna Aur Kans	Ugrasen	Voice (final film role)

=== TV series ===
Year	Title	Role	Notes
1986	Darkness		TV mini-series
1986	Masterpiece Theatre: Lord Mountbatten – The Last Viceroy	Vallabhbhai Patel	TV mini-series
1988	Jeevan Rekha		TV series
1993	Zabaan Sambhalke	Cameo in one episode	
1996	Chandrakanta	Parichand	An old man role
1997	Betaal Pachisi	Baba	
1997	Bombay Blue	Saraswami Giri	Episode #1.3
1998	Aahat	Death	Episodes: "Jeevan Mrityu Part I and II"
2004–2005	Hotel Kingston		Cameo
2012	Madhubala - Ek Ishq Ek Junoon	Himself	Special appearance

== Works ==
- Life and Times of A.K. Hangal (1999) (Autobiography)
