= Manas Mukherjee =

Indian composer, music director and singer (1943–1986)

Background information
- Also known as: Manas Mukharji
- Born: 9 September 1943; Kolkata, Bengal Presidency, British India
- Died: 16 October 1986 (aged 43) Bombay, Maharashtra, India
- Genre: Filmi
- Occupations: Composer; Music director; Singer
- Instruments: Harmonium; Tabla; Dholak
- Years active: 1960–1986
- Spouse: Sonali Mukherjee

Manas Mukherjee (also spelled Manas Mukharji; 9 September 1943 – 16 October 1986) was an Indian composer, music director and singer who worked primarily in Hindi cinema during the late 1970s and 1980s. Although his filmography was relatively modest in size, he composed music for several films and occasionally contributed as a playback singer. He belonged to a musical family and is remembered as the father of popular playback singers Shaan and Sagarika.

== Early life and background ==
Manas Mukherjee was born on 9 September 1943 in Kolkata (then Calcutta) into a family deeply involved in music. His father, Jahar Mukherjee, was a thumri singer, composer, lyricist and film producer who was active in the Bengali cultural and film scene. Growing up in this environment exposed Mukherjee to classical and light classical music from an early age, which later influenced his work as a film composer.

== Career ==
=== Music direction ===
Mukherjee began working in Hindi films in the late 1970s. He composed the soundtrack for Shaayad (1979), which featured songs sung by prominent artists of the time including Manna Dey, Asha Bhosle, Mohammed Rafi and Usha Mangeshkar. He went on to score music for several other films over the next few years, including Labbaik (1980), Albert Pinto Ko Gussa Kyoon Aata Hai? (1980), Guru Suleman Chela Pahelwan (1981), Lubna (1982), Aao Pyaar Karen (1983), Dilawar (1984), Lakhon Ki Baat (1984) and Mahananda (1984). He is also associated with the earlier film Teesra Patthar and the posthumously released Banda Nawaz (1989).

His compositions often featured a melodic style typical of the period. Among the better-known songs from his film work are “Mausam Aayega Jaayega Pyar Sada Muskurayega” (Shaayad), sung by Manna Dey and Asha Bhosle with lyrics by Vithalbhai Patel, and “Yeh Zuban Humse See Nahin Jaati” from the same film, rendered by Usha Mangeshkar. For Labbaik, he composed “Dayar-E-Mustafa Mein”, while for Mahananda he created “Mere Tere Naam Naye Hain” (sung by Usha Mangeshkar and Bhupinder Singh) and the solo “Mann Naahin Laage Mitwa”, which he sang himself. Both songs from Mahananda carried lyrics by Nida Fazli.

=== Work as a singer ===
In addition to composing, Mukherjee occasionally sang in films. He performed the duet “Yeh Husnwale Bade Beimaan” with Meenu Purushottam in Guru Suleman Chela Pahelwan. He also sang “Sambhaalo Ae Watanwalo Watan Apna Sambhaalo” (with Mahendra Kapoor) in Bharat Ke Shaheed, composed by Prem Dhawan, and “Phool Chala Re Phulwari Se” in Narad Leela, composed by Narayan Dutt.

== Personal life ==
Mukherjee was married to Sonali Mukherjee, a professional chorus singer who worked in the Hindi film industry for around three decades (approximately 1970–2000). The couple had two children: daughter Sagarika (born 1970) and son Shantanu Mukherjee (born 1972), who later became known professionally as the singer Shaan.

After Mukherjee’s death, Sonali raised their two children as a single parent while continuing her work as a chorus singer. Shaan has publicly acknowledged his mother’s role in supporting his decision to pursue a career in music.

== Death ==
Manas Mukherjee died on 16 October 1986 in Bombay (now Mumbai) at the age of 43. At the time of his death, his son Shaan was 14 years old and his daughter Sagarika was 16.

== Legacy ==
Although Mukherjee’s career as a film music director was relatively short and not marked by major commercial blockbusters, he is remembered within the industry and by music enthusiasts for his melodic compositions and for belonging to a multi-generational musical family. His children Shaan and Sagarika both established successful careers as singers in Indian pop and film music. Shaan has occasionally spoken about his father’s influence and the musical atmosphere in which he grew up.

== Selected filmography as music director ==
Year	Title	Notes
—	Teesra Patthar	
1979	Shaayad	
1980	Labbaik	
1980	Albert Pinto Ko Gussa Kyoon Aata Hai?	
1981	Guru Suleman Chela Pahelwan	
1982	Lubna	
1983	Aao Pyaar Karen	
1984	Dilawar	
1984	Lakhon Ki Baat	
1984	Mahananda	
1989	Banda Nawaz	Released posthumously

== Selected songs ==
Song	Film	Singer(s)	Lyricist
"Mausam Aayega Jaayega Pyar Sada Muskurayega"	Shaayad	Manna Dey, Asha Bhosle	Vithalbhai Patel
"Yeh Zuban Humse See Nahin Jaati"	Shaayad	Usha Mangeshkar	Dushyant Kumar
"Dayar-E-Mustafa Mein – Part II"	Labbaik	Narendra Chanchal, Majeed Shola	Nida Fazli
"Yeh Husnwale Bade Beimaan"	Guru Suleman Chela Pahelwan	Manas Mukherjee, Meenu Purushottam	Asad Bhopali
"Mere Tere Naam Naye Hain"	Mahananda	Usha Mangeshkar, Bhupinder Singh	Nida Fazli
"Mann Naahin Laage Mitwa"	Mahananda	Manas Mukherjee	Nida Fazli
