= Ratnadeep (1979 film) =

1979 film by Basu Chatterjee

- Poster
- Directed by: Basu Chatterjee
- Screenplay by: Basu Chatterjee
- Story by: F. C. Mehra
- Produced by: Basu Chatterjee
- Starring: Hema Malini; Girish Karnad
- Cinematography: A. K. Bir
- Music by: R. D. Burman; Gulzar (lyrics)
- Release date: 1979
- Running time: 100 minutes
- Country: India
- Language: Hindi

Ratnadeep (transl. The Jewelled Lamp) is a 1979 Hindi film written and directed by Basu Chatterjee. The film starred Hema Malini and Girish Karnad in lead roles. The film has music by R. D. Burman with lyrics by Gulzar. The movie was reported to be based on a short story by Prabhat Kumar Mukhopadhyay.

== Cast ==
- Hema Malini
- Girish Karnad
- A.K. Hangal
- Prema Narayan
- Dheeraj Kumar
- Imtiaz Khan
- Poornima Jayaram
- Sulochana Latkar
- Gautam Sarin
- Pinchoo Kapoor
- Yunus Parvez

== Plot ==
Madan (played by Girish Karnad) works as a railways official in Tarapore, a remote village. He finds life in the village very monotonous and uninteresting. The daughter of Madan's superior, the Railway Station Master, is in love with him and wishes to marry him. However, Madan is reluctant to marry her because he would then need to continue to live in Tarapore. Madan applies for leave of absence from work.

One day a train arrives in Tarapore with the corpse of a sadhu. Madan refuses to allow the offloading of the dead body, but the passengers refuse to travel further with a corpse in tow. Madan is forced into ordering railway workers to offload the corpse and its belongings. The workers mention that the dead man resembles him. He acknowledges that the dead body, albeit with a beard, does resemble him. But Madan is in no mood to dwell on this matter as he is eager to leave Tarapore. Soon the official supposed to replace for him at the railway station arrives. Madan declares to the new entrant that he would never return to such a boring existence. The Station Master's daughter bids goodbye to him.

Madan notices an unfamiliar package and opens it. It contains the dead sadhu's identification papers. The sadhu belonged to a well known zamindar family. His diary mentions the details of his family. Madan decides to visit the family but as he read on, he realises the Sadhu was a rich man. Madan's mind begins to change. Now he begins to practise the dead man's signature, practises his handwriting and gradually changes himself as he becomes the man in the picture. He informs the family that he is arriving. At the Raja's house we are introduced to his young wife.

His wife who has led a widow's life for the past 7 years was two months pregnant when her husband left the palace. Her son is now 7 years old. The family is happy with the Raja's return. Madan becomes Raja Hari Prasad. However Raja's brother-in-law Dheeraj is the only one suspicious of Hari Prasad. He sets out to Haridwar to enquire about Raja Hari Prasad. Sadhus at Haridwar admit that the Sadhu has indeed stayed with them for years.

Madan as Hari Prasad is happy with the adulation and continues to cheat everybody. But somehow he does not cheat his wife. But his wife, longs for his company. She reminisces the good olden days. Madan tells her he is in some penance and cannot touch women, even his wife. She respects his commitment. She notices he is always making excuses to avoid her company. One day when Madan gets a chance to visit the city, he decides to escape. He collects all the cash from the safe and leaves on the pretext that he has some bank work. But his child accompanies him. However, his plan fails and Madan returns to the Palace. Madan realises that he is falling in love with the Rani.

On the fateful day- mother of the Raja (Sulochana) gives her daughter-in-law a Ratnadeep and asks the latter to perform the puja of her husband. Madan, unable to cheat her, reveals her that he was not her husband. Hearing that the man who is standing in front of her was an impostor not her husband Rani falls accidentally causing fire.

Madan tries to help her. Though she is in a state of semi-consciousness she vehemently refuses to be touched by him. She yells "No! No! Please do not touch me." The entire family get to know that Madan is an imposter. Rani confesses before her mother-in-law that the impostor did not touch her. Watching the impostor leave, she dies. When her body is cremated Madan watches from behind a tree. When he tries to touch the ashes the words "No! No! Do not touch" ring in his ears. He leaves without touching her ashes.

== Soundtrack ==
The music for the film was directed by R. D. Burman and the lyrics were written by Gulzar.

Song	Singer
"Kabhi Kabhi Sapna Lagta Hai"	Kishore Kumar, Asha Bhosle
"Man Bahek Raha Hai"	Asha Bhosle
"Aisa Ho To Kaisa Hoga"	Asha Bhosle
"Sajan Aaye Ho, Sajni Ke Sajanwa Aangan Aaye Ho"	Bhupinder Singh, Sapan Chakraborty
