= Pasand Apni Apni =

- DVD Cover
- Directed by: Basu Chatterjee
- Produced by: Basu Chatterjee
- Starring: Ashok Kumar; Mithun Chakraborty; Rati Agnihotri; Utpal Dutt
- Music by: Bappi Lahiri
- Release date: 2 December 1983
- Running time: 125 minutes
- Country: India
- Language: Hindi

Pasand Apni Apni is a 1983 Indian Hindi-language film directed by Basu Chatterjee. It stars Ashok Kumar, Mithun Chakraborty, Rati Agnihotri, Utpal Dutt. The concept of this movie is based on the 1951 British film Happy Go Lovely, which was earlier used in the 1969 movie Sajan and subsequently in Ghajini.

== Plot ==
A misunderstanding leads to love. In this story, actress Geeta, who has almost run out of work, accepts a lift from the chauffeur of Sandeep Anand. When she is seen getting out of his limousine, she is mistaken for his fiancée, a fact that remains unknown to her. Wonderful things then begin to happen: her theatre company makes her the lead in all their productions, she is courted and fêted wherever she goes, and a journalist becomes her constant shadow. She finds herself falling for him, only to discover that he is none other than Sandeep Anand himself.

== Cast ==
- Ashok Kumar as Shantilal Anand
- Mithun Chakraborty as Sandeep Anand
- Rati Agnihotri as Geeta
- Utpal Dutt as Sriram Chaudhary
- Neelam Mehra as Neelam
- Subiraj as Tailor master Ismail
- Javed Khan as Maruti
- Jayshree T. as Former main dancer
- Atul Agnihotri as Anil

== Soundtrack ==
The music of the film was composed by Bappi Lahiri, while lyrics were penned by Yogesh.

No.	Title	Singer(s)
1	"Kiske Pyar Me Khoye Hue Ho"	Asha Bhosle
2	"Are Woh Dene Wala"	Shakti Thakur, Shailendra Singh
3	"Aisa To Socha Na Tha, Aise Hi Kya Ho Gaya"	Asha Bhosle
4	"Gayi Kahe Ko Mai Gayi Kahe Ko Bagiya Me"	Asha Bhosle
5	"Tum Jo Mile Ho Geet Saje Hai"	Asha Bhosle, Suresh Wadkar
6	"Ding Dong Ding Dong, Bole Ghari"	Sharon Prabhakar
