= Shoukheeen =

1982 film by Basu Chatterjee

- Directed by: Basu Chatterjee
- Screenplay by: Basu Chatterjee
- Dialogues by: Shani
- Story by: Samaresh Basu
- Produced by: Devika Mitar
- Starring: Ashok Kumar; Utpal Dutt; A.K. Hangal; Mithun Chakraborty; Rati Agnihotri
- Cinematography: Ajay Prabhakar
- Edited by: V. N. Mayekar
- Music by: R. D. Burman
- Production company: Senmit Movie Visuals
- Release date: 16 April 1982
- Country: India
- Language: Hindi

Shoukheeen (also spelt as Shaukeen; Hindi pronunciation: [ʃou̯.kʰeen]; transl. Enthusiast) is a 1982 Indian Hindi-language comedy film co-written and directed by Basu Chatterjee. It stars Ashok Kumar, Utpal Dutt, A. K. Hangal, Mithun Chakraborty and Rati Agnihotri. Produced by Devika Mitar under the banner of Senmit Movie Visuals, the film is based on Samaresh Basu's story Ram Nam Kewalam, and also draws inspirations from the 1962 American film Boys' Night Out. It plots three lecherous, aging friends' spicing up their lives by vacationing in Goa, where they woo a young woman to be comically outsmarted by their driver, as well as her secret lover.

Basu Chaterjee loved the song "Nitol Paye Rinik Jhinik" sung and composed by S. D. Burman since childhood and requested S. D.'s son R. D. Burman to compose song Jab Bhi Koi using same tune in the film.

== Plot ==
Shaukeen is a movie that features three men acted by Ashok Kumar, Utpal Dutt and A.K. Hangal, Hangal who have a strong interest, in women. One day they gather at Ashok Kumars house for some drinks. Then choose to go on a trip to have fun and make the most of their remaining time.

They hire a driver Ravi (Mithun Chakraborty), a friend of the son of Choudhuri (Ashok Kumar), who takes the name Sakharam. He ends up convincing them to go to Goa where his lover, who works as a singer/dancer at a local club, resides. While in Goa, the three old men get into hilarious situations with Anita (Rati Agnihotri) as they try to impress her and try to get lucky with her, oblivious to the fact that she is their driver's love interest.

== Cast ==
- Ashok Kumar as Om Prakash Chaudhary
- Utpal Dutt as Jagdishbhai
- A.K. Hangal as Indrasen (Anderson)
- Mithun Chakraborty as Ravi Anand
- Rati Agnihotri as Anita
- Gita Siddharth as Anuradha Devi
- Ashalata Wabgaonkar
- Jayshree T. as Girl passing on the street

== Songs ==
The music of the film was composed by R. D. Burman, while lyrics were penned by Yogesh.

- "Jab Bhi Koi Kanganaa Bole Paayal Chhanak Jaaye" - Kishore Kumar
- "Ye Range Mehfil" - Asha Bhosle
- "Aa Wahin Chal Mere Dil Khushi Jisne Di Hai" - Suresh Wadkar
- "Chalo Haseen Geet Ek Banaye" - Ashok Kumar, Chirashree Bhattacharya
- "Suhani Sham Aayi Hai" - Asha Bhosle
- "Hum Tum Aur Ye Nasha" - Sapan Chakravarty, Chirashree Bhattacharya

== Awards ==
30th Filmfare Awards:

Nominated

- Best Comedian – Ashok Kumar
- Best Comedian – Utpal Dutt

== Remakes ==
The film was remade in Telugu as Prema Pichollu with Chiranjeevi, Gummadi and Allu Ramalingaiah.

A remake of Shaukeen released under the title of The Shaukeens on 7 November 2014. The remake featured actors Piyush Mishra, Anupam Kher and Annu Kapoor along with Lisa Haydon as the female lead. The film was produced by Grazing Goat Pictures.
