= Swami (1977 film) =

- Poster
- Directed by: Basu Chatterjee
- Written by: Manu Bhandari (dialogue); Basu Chatterjee (writer); Sharat Chandra Chatterji (story)
- Produced by: Jaya Charavarty
- Starring: Shabana Azmi; Vikram; Girish Karnad; Deepak Kumar
- Cinematography: K. K. Mahajan
- Music by: Rajesh Roshan; Amit Khanna (lyrics)
- Release date: 1977
- Country: India
- Language: Hindi

Swami is a 1977 Indian Hindi-language romance drama film directed by Basu Chatterjee and produced by Jaya Chakravarty. The film stars Shabana Azmi, Vikram, Girish Karnad and Utpal Dutt. Hema Malini and Dharmendra made guest appearances together in the film. The film's music is by Rajesh Roshan. The film was shot in location in Dahisar, Mumbai and the Dahisar River Banks.

== Plot ==
"Saudamini" is a bright village girl with academic ambitions and an appetite for literature and philosophy. Her intellectual uncle indulges her brainy bent, encouraging her studies and patching up the petty ongoing conflicts with her mother, a pious widow whose only concern is to see Mini married, and quickly. Mini is in love with Narendra (Vikram), the Zamindar's son, a student in Calcutta who on his visits brings her Victorian literature, listens raptly to her discourse, and is bold enough to kiss her opportunistically when caught together in a rainstorm. However circumstances conspire against Mini and Narendra, and Mini finds herself married against her wishes to Ghanshyam a wheat trader from a neighboring village. While her husband treats her with a patience which she finds perplexing, Mini struggles to become accustomed to life in her new home. And then Narendra returns. How does she resolve her dilemma?

== Cast ==
- Shabana Azmi as Saudamini
- Girish Karnad as Ghanshyam
- Utpal Dutt as Mini's uncle
- Vikram Makandar as Narendra
- Sudha Shivpuri as Mini's mother
- Shashikala as Ghanshyam's step-mother
- Preeti Ganguly as Charu Devi
- Hema Malini as a Nautanki dancer (special appearance)
- Dharmendra as a Nautanki dancer (special appearance)
- Dheeraj Kumar as Nikhil
- Ritu Kamal as Shobha
- Deepak Kumar as Deepak, Charu's prospective groom
- Vinita Dutt as Mukta
- Kedarnath Saigal as Mukhiya ji
- Amol Sen as Jagannath - sarvant in Ghanshyam's house
- Kartik Dutt as Ramu

== Soundtrack ==
The music is by Rajesh Roshan, who received a Filmfare nomination for composing memorable numbers like Kishore Kumar's "Yaadon Mein Woh", Yesudas's "Kaa Karoon Sajni" and Lata Mangeshkar's "Pal Bhar Mein Yeh Kya Ho Gaya".

=== Track list ===
Song	Singer
"Yaadon Mein Woh"	Kishore Kumar
"Ka Karoon Sajni Aaye Na Balam"	K. J. Yesudas
"Pal Bhar Mein Yeh Kya Ho Gaya"	Lata Mangeshkar
"Aaj Ki Raat Kuchh Hogi Aisi Baat"	Asha Bhosle, K. J. Yesudas

== Awards ==
25th Filmfare Awards:

Won

- Best Director – Basu Chatterjee
- Best Actress – Shabana Azmi
- Best Story – Sarat Chandra Chattopadhyay

Nominated

- Best Film – Jayasarathy Combine
- Best Music Director – Rajesh Roshan
- Best Male Playback Singer – K.J. Yesudas for "Aaye Na Balam"
