= Jeena Yahan =

- Directed by: Basu Chatterjee
- Based on: Ekhane Aakash Neyi by Manu Bhandari
- Produced by: N.P. Ali
- Starring: Shekhar Kapur; Shabana Azmi; Amol Palekar; Zarina Wahab; Vidya Sinha; Desh Maheshwari
- Cinematography: K. K. Mahajan
- Music by: Salil Chowdhury
- Release date: 1979
- Country: India
- Language: Hindi

Jeena Yahan is a 1979 Bollywood film, directed by Basu Chatterjee and produced by N.P. Ali under Jamu Pictures. The film is based on story Ekhane Aakash Neyi by Manu Bhandari.

== Cast ==
- Shekhar Kapur
- Shabana Azmi
- Dina Pathak
- Sunder
- Purohit
- Arvind Deshpande
- Devendra Khandelwal (as Devendra)
- Kiran Vairale
- V.K. Pathak
- Amol Palekar ... Guest appearance
- Zarina Wahab ... Guest appearance
- Vidya Sinha ... Guest appearance
- Desh Maheshwari as Shankar

== Music ==
The music of the film was composed by Salil Chowdhury, while lyrics were penned by Yogesh.

- "Hum Nahi Dukh Se Ghabraye" – Lata Mangeshkar, KJ Yesudas
- "Shaam Aayi Hai" – Lata Mangeshkar
- "Yehi To Hai Meri" – Sabita Chowdhury
