= Tumhare Liye =

- Directed by: Basu Chatterjee
- Starring: Sanjeev Kumar; Vidya Sinha; Ashok Kumar
- Cinematography: K. K. Mahajan
- Music by: Jaidev; Naqsh Lyallpuri (lyrics)
- Distributed by: Yash Raj Films
- Release date: 1978
- Country: India
- Language: Hindi

Tumhare Liye (transl. For Your Sake) is a 1978 Indian Hindi-language film directed by Basu Chatterjee. The film stars Sanjeev Kumar, Vidya Sinha and Ashok Kumar as leads with music scored by Jaidev. This movie seems to be inspired by the novel Green Darkness written by Anya Seton.

== Plot ==
The story begins in 1905 and propels forward to 1978 when Gauri (Vidya Sinha) and Prakash (Sanjeev Kumar) fall in love and marry against odds. Prakash is originally expected to marry Renuka (Neelam Mehra) but he chooses Gauri over her much to Renuka's displeasure.

After the wedding, the couple heads to Rajasthan for honeymoon on Gauri's insistence. However, Gauri starts behaving in a weird manner, lost in thoughts, pining for an unseen lover and begins to refuse Prakash's romantic advances. Gradually, Gauri takes ill and is hospitalised as her mental state deteriorates to an extent where she looks to end her life.

Psychiatric treatment reveals a dark and troublesome past where Gauri (a vivacious girl) and Gangadhar Upadhyay (a reserved sanyasi) fall in love while Kalawati (now Renuka) tries to separate them to secure Gangadhar for herself. Though a prince by birth, Gangadhar has been sworn in to be a sanyasi at the temple based on family tradition and is socially barred to interact with women. However, after falling in love with Gauri, he breaks his celibacy by having sex with Gauri and disowns his priesthood. In anger, the temple head curses him to be deprived of his love and child until another girl sacrifices herself for him. Sometime later, Gauri becomes pregnant. Kalawati invites Gauri to her house and forcefully poisons her. When Gangadhar learns of Gauri and his unborn child's death, he too joins their tragic fate by committing suicide.

This cycle must be broken in the current birth. Gauri and Prakash come to know through Dr. Vachaspati (Vaidyaraj in their past life) that the child must not die to avoid a repeat of the past-birth tragedy. Renuka has vowed to pull Prakash away from Gauri and prepares to push Gauri into taking poison once again. When she is made to understand that if she kills Gauri, the entire past tragedy will repeat, a frustrated Renuka decides to drink the poison herself and free Gauri and Prakash from their curse. The film concludes with Gauri and Prakash's child playing happily while deceased Renuka's photograph hangs above.

== Cast ==
- Ashok Kumar as Dr. Vachaspati/Vaidyaraj
- Sanjeev Kumar as Prakash/Gangadhar Upadhyay
- Vidya Sinha as Gauri
- Neelam Mehra as Renuka/Kalavati
- Zarina Wahab as Rajnartaki
- Anita Guha as Sheeladevi
- Suresh Chatwal as Vishal
- A. K. Hangal as Bhavani
- Dinesh Hingoo as Anokhelal
- Pinchoo Kapoor as Mathadhar
- Indrani Mukherjee as Saudamani
- Om Shivpuri as Tantrik
- Zarina Wahab as Rajnartaki
- Ratnamala as Phoolkumari
- Brahm Bhardwaj as Dr. Vyas

== Crew ==
- Director - Basu Chatterjee
- Cinematographer - K. K. Mahajan
- Music Director - Jaidev Verma
- Lyricist - Naqsh Lyallpuri
- Playback Singers - Asha Bhosle, Lata Mangeshkar, Usha Mangeshkar

== Music ==
Song title	Singers	Time	Raga
"Tumhen Dekhti Hoon To"	Lata Mangeshkar	5:40	Shivaranjani
"Mere Hathon Mein Lage To Rang"	Asha Bhosle	4:25	
"Bol Radha Shyam Diwani"	Lata Mangeshkar	5:25	
"More Taras Taras Gaye Naina"	Usha Mangeshkar	3:55	
"Bansuriya Man Har Legayi"	Asha Bhosle	4:15	
