= Naram Garam =

1981 film by Hrishikesh Mukherjee

- Directed by: Hrishikesh Mukherjee
- Starring: Amol Palekar; Swaroop Sampat; Shatrughan Sinha; Utpal Dutt; A. K. Hangal
- Music by: R. D. Burman
- Release date: 28 February 1981
- Country: India
- Language: Hindi

Naram Garam (meaning: Soft hot) is a 1981 Indian Hindi-language comedy-drama film directed by Hrishikesh Mukherjee. The film was produced by Subhash Gupta and Uday Narayan Singh and had music by R. D. Burman. It reprises many actors and actresses from the 1979 film Gol Maal with the same names. It was also directed by Hrishikesh Mukherjee and starred Amol Palekar in the lead and Utpal Dutt won filmfare award best comic role . It was also remade as Krishnaleela in Telugu which was released in 1987.

== Plot ==
Naram Garam is the story of Kusum and her father, who are left homeless due to non-repayment of debts from the local money lender. They are helped by Ramprasad, who is in love with Kusum. Bhavani Shankar, Ramprasad's employer, is feared by his family members and employees, but is himself terrified of his own mother-in-law. Ramprasad helps Bhavani Shankar get the possession of his ancestral home after a 53-year-long legal battle with a squatter and is therefore assigned the responsibility of getting the house back in shape so that it can be re-occupied. In the meanwhile, Kusum and her father come to the shelter of Ramprasad and start staying in the house. Ramprasad doesn't have a house of his own, hence decides to let them stay illegally until he can find an alternative.

When this comes to the knowledge of the estate manager, Gajanan Babu (Suresh Chatwal), he arrives furious and determined to oust the squatters. However, he succumbs to the charms of Kusum and instead of ousting the old man and his daughter, presents a proposal of marriage. Horrified, Kusum and Ramprasad turn to Kali Shankar, a.k.a. Babua, Bhavani Shankar's younger brother, for help. Babua is a garage mechanic and a ruffian with a kind heart for women in distress. He successfully dissuades Gajanan Babu from carrying through with his proposal, but is also determined to oust Kusum and her father. However, he too is captivated by Kusum's beauty and presses his suit. Then Ramprasad finally turns to Bhavani Shankar, who dissuades Babua using his younger brother's fear of him.

Bhavani Prasad comes to his home to oust the illegal residents, but is captivated by Kusum's voice and beauty. Being a very superstitious man and a faithful believer of astrologers, Bhavani Prasad believes that Kusum is the reincarnation of his dead wife Ahilya . He decides to marry Kusum. Ramprasad finds the situation becoming very sticky, but decides to play along.

Bhavani Shankar takes all the precautions to make sure the marriage would take place secretly, only with Ramprasad's knowledge. However, Ramprasad invites Bhavani Shankar's mother-in-law and daughter to come to the house at exact date and time of the marriage, without telling them of the marriage itself. Bhavani Shankar now finds himself in a flux, not having the courage to get married in their presence. He secretly convinces Ramprasad to marry Kusum instead. Ramprasad negotiates his salary and the house in return of the deal. Thus, Ramprasad and Kusum finally get married and the reality behind the whole affair remains undiscovered.

== Cast ==
- Amol Palekar as Ram Prasad
- Swaroop Sampat as Kusum
- Shatrughan Sinha as Kali Shankar Bajpai "Babua"
- Utpal Dutt as Bhavani Shankar Bajpai
- A. K. Hangal as Vishnu Prasad "Masterji"
- Kiran Vairale as Sumitra
- Suresh Chatwal as Gajanan
- Javed Khan Amrohi as Chandu
- Padma Chavan as Ratna
- Anand as Birju
- Dina Pathak as Naniji (Special appearance)
- Om Prakash as Shastriji (Special appearance)
- Nilu Phule as Guruji (Special appearance)
- Meena Roy (Special appearance)
- Devi Chand as Devichand

== Soundtrack ==
Song	Singer
"Naram Naram Raat Mein, Garam Garam Chand Par"	Sapan Chakraborty, R. D. Burman
"Kaisan Shaadi Rachai Ho Dekho Humri Behaniya"	Sapan Chakraborty, Suresh Wadkar
"Ek Baat Suni Hai Chacha Ji, Batlanewali Hai"	Shatrughan Sinha, Sushma Shrestha
"Hamen Raston Ki Zaroorat"	Asha Bhosle
"Mere Chehre Mein Chhupa"	Asha Bhosle
"Mere Angna Aaye Re"	Asha Bhosle
