= Mr. Prime Minister =

- Theatrical release poster
- Directed by: Dev Anand
- Written by: Dev Anand
- Produced by: Dev Anand
- Starring: Dev Anand; Prem Chopra; Boman Irani; A.K. Hangal
- Cinematography: Simon Hawken
- Edited by: Ashok Bandekar
- Music by: Bappi Lahiri
- Release date: 30 December 2005
- Country: India
- Language: Hindi

Mr. Prime Minister is a 2005 Indian Hindi-language satire film produced, directed and written by Dev Anand for Navketan films. The film stars himself, Shahbaz Khan, Prem Chopra, Boman Irani, Milind Gunaji, and A.K. Hangal.

== Plot ==
Johnny Master, a survivor of earthquake-ravaged Kutch is a happy-go-lucky elderly man who sells newspapers for a living in a small village in Gujarat. His life takes a new turn when the government declares post-earthquake parliamentary elections. Residents of the village decide to form a new political party and make Johnny their candidate.

== Cast ==
- Dev Anand as Johny Master
- Tara Sharma as Roshanara
- Shahbaz Khan
- Mohan Joshi as Raja Sahab
- Prem Chopra
- A.K. Hangal
- Boman Irani
- Milind Gunaji
- Dev Gill as Al Qaida man

== Music ==
1. "Mr. Prime Minister" (Hindi) - Dev Anand
2. "Chuimui Si Zindagi" - Sunidhi Chauhan
3. "Main Khoya Tha Awara Hai" - Babul Supriyo
4. "Yeh Sama Hain Na" - Sunidhi Chauhan
5. "Mr. Prime Minister" (English) - Dev Anand
