= Lakhon Ki Baat =

- Directed by: Basu Chatterjee
- Screenplay by: Basu Chatterjee
- Produced by: Basu Chatterjee
- Starring: Sanjeev Kumar; Farooq Shaikh; Anita Raj
- Cinematography: Ajay Prabhakar
- Edited by: Kamal Saigal
- Music by: Manas Mukherjee
- Release date: 6 July 1984 (India)
- Country: India
- Language: Hindi

Lakhon Ki Baat is a 1984 Indian Bollywood film produced and directed by Basu Chatterjee. It stars Sanjeev Kumar, Farooq Shaikh and Anita Raj in pivotal roles. The movie has the Same plot as in The Fortune Cookie (1966).

== Cast ==
- Sanjeev Kumar as Advocate Prem Sagar
- Farooq Shaikh as Alok Prakash
- Anita Raj as Shobha Prakash
- Utpal Dutt as Maganbhai
- Pinchoo Kapoor as Rongta Seth
- Dinesh Hingoo as Advocate Desai
- Anjali Sen as Neela Kaul

== Soundtrack ==
The music of the film was composed by Manas Mukherjee, while lyrics were penned by Yogesh.

1. "Ek Tum Ho Jaise" - Anuradha Paudwal
2. "Jeevan Ki Rahon Me" - Alka Yagnik
3. "Jeevan Ki Rahon Me (Duet)" - Shabbir Kumar, Chandrani Mukherjee
4. "Reshmi Gul Zara Kijiye" - Anuradha Paudwal
5. "Lakhon Ki Hai Baat" - Alka Yagnik, Shakti Thakur

== Plot ==
Sports photographer Alok Prakash (Farooq Shaikh) is shooting a female field hockey game when he's hit with a stray ball. Prakash is hospitalized but only suffers from minor injuries, though his enterprising brother-in-law, Prem Sagar (Sanjeev Kumar), sees an opportunity to make some easy money. Sagar, a lawyer, asks Prakash to exaggerate his injury so he can file a lawsuit and they can live off the settlement. Soon, the whole family is involved, and Prakash and Sagar find the ruse hard to keep up.
