= Prem Vivah =

- Directed by: Basu Chatterjee
- Produced by: Ramraj Nahta
- Starring: Asha Parekh; Bindiya Goswami; Mithun Chakraborty; Utpal Dutt
- Cinematography: A. K. Bir
- Edited by: V. N. Mayekar
- Music by: Laxmikant–Pyarelal; Anand Bakshi (lyrics)
- Release date: 14 September 1979 (India)
- Running time: 150 minutes
- Country: India
- Language: Hindi

Prem Vivah is a 1979 Indian Hindi-language film directed by Basu Chatterjee and produced by Ramraj Nahta, starring Mithun Chakraborty, Bindiya Goswami, Utpal Dutt and Asha Parekh.

== Plot ==
Asha Parekh plays an unmarried woman in her 30s, past what society considered the marriageable age. Her younger sister played by Bindiya Goswami has a fiancée Mithun Chakraborty. She feels guilty that she is about to have a happy married life, while her older sister will be all alone by herself. She sets out to find a husband for her. When she sees her sister admire Utpal Dutt on television, she brings him into their lives. Unfortunately, Utpal Dutt falls for Bindiya Goswami and isn't aware that Asha Parekh has fallen in love with him. How Bindiya untangles herself from this situation and gets Utpal Dutt and Asha Parekh together forms the rest of the story.

== Cast ==
- Asha Parekh ... Neela
- Mithun Chakraborty ... Ajay
- Bindiya Goswami ... Deepa
- Utpal Dutt ... Dr. Bhaskar
- Deven Verma ... Guest Appearance

== Crew ==
- Director – Basu Chatterjee
- Producer – Ramraj Nahta
- Screenplay – Basu Chatterjee
- Cinematographer – A. K. Bir
- Editor – V. N. Mayekar
- Costumes Designer – Leena Daru, Mani Rabadi
- Choreographer – Oscar, Vijay
- Music Director – Laxmikant–Pyarelal
- Lyricist – Anand Bakshi
- Playback Singers – Lata Mangeshkar, Amit Kumar, Anuradha Paudwal, Kishore Kumar, Shailendra Singh

== Soundtrack ==
Laxmikant-Pyarelal has composed music with lyrics by Anand Bakshi.

Song	Singer
"Milte Rahiye, Milne Se Dil Mil Jayenge"	Kishore Kumar, Amit Kumar
"Kaga Mera Ek Kaam Karna"	Lata Mangeshkar
"Jinke Aane Se Pehle Sharm Aa Gayi"	Lata Mangeshkar
"Prem Hai Jeevan, Prem Hai Yauvan"	Anuradha Paudwal, Shailendra Singh
