= Ashalata Wabgaonkar =

Indian actress (1941–2020)

- Born: 2 July 1941; Goa, Portuguese India
- Died: 22 September 2020 (aged 79); Satara, Maharashtra, India
- Occupation: Actress
- Years active: 1970–2020

Ashalata Wabgaonkar (2 July 1941 – 22 September 2020), better known as Ashalata, was an Indian actress. Originally tracing her roots to Palolem, Goa, she was associated with the Mumbai-based Goa Hindu Association. She acted in over a hundred Hindi and Marathi movies. She also sang some Konkani songs broadcast over the Mumbai station of the All India Radio.

== Early life and education ==
Goa-born Wabgaonkar was also famous as a Marathi singer and playwright, besides being a film actress. She studied at the St. Columba's Girls High School at Gramdevi, Mumbai and was a post-graduate in Psychology from the SNDT Women's University. She first started performing in Konkani and Marathi plays.

== Career ==
She acted in more than a hundred Hindi and Marathi movies. Some of her Marathi plays are Guntata Hridhya He, Varyavarchi Varaat, Chinna (with Smita Patil and Sadashiv Amrapurkar) and Mahananda. Her Marathi stage career took off with the musical play Matsyagandha.

She was introduced in Hindi films by Basu Chatterjee in Apne Paraye (along with Bharati Achrekar) for which she was nominated for Filmfare Award for Best Supporting Actress. She starred in films such as Ankush (1986), Apne Paraye (1980), Ahista Ahista, Shaukeen, Woh Saat Din, Namak Halaal and Yaadon Ki Kasam (1985). For appearing in Bollywood in Basu Chatterjee's film Apne Paraye, she bagged the 'Bengal Critics Award' and the Filmfare Award for the Best Supporting Actor. She played the role of Amitabh Bachchan's stepmother in the film Zanjeer. Ashalata has acted in many successful Hindi films including Ankush, Apne Paraye, Ahista Ahista, Shaukeen, Woh Saat Din, Namak Halal and Yaadon Ki Kasam.

Ashalata was a big name in the Marathi theater world too and made her dramatic debut in the role of Revathi in the play Sangeet Sanshaykallol presented by The Goa Hindu Association. The Marathi drama Matsyagandha proved to be a milestone in Ashalata's acting career. In this work, she also sang the songs Garda Sabbhoti Ran Sajni Tu Tar Chafekali, and Arthashunya Bhase Maja ha Kalaha Jeevanacha.

She received training in classical music and was a fine Marathi Natyasangeet singer. Some of her Marathi films are Umbartha, Sutradhar, Navri Mile Navryala and Vahinichi Maya. Gard Sabhowati, a book authored by Ashalata Wabgaonkar and published by Lotus Publications, Mumbai, touches on the memories and journey of the author in the film industry.

== Death ==
Wabgaonkar died from COVID-19 on 22 September 2020, during the COVID-19 pandemic in India in Satara, Maharashtra, while shooting for a Marathi serial Aai Mazi Kalubai. She was 79. On being unwell, she was admitted to a private hospital in Satara, Maharashtra, and was found positive for COVID-19. She was taking a ventilator treatment. She died around 4.45 AM on the morning of 22 September 2020. Her remains were cremated in Satara itself by co-actor Alka Kubal. "She was put on a ventilator on Monday night after her oxygen levels fell drastically and died early on Tuesday at around 4:45 am. Her family couldn't come due to the ongoing pandemic and told us to cremate her in Satara and not bring her body down to Mumbai", Alka Kubal said.

== Selected filmography ==
- Zanjeer as Police Inspector's wife - Vijay's stepmother (1973)
- Chalte Chalte (1976)
- Apne Paraye as Sidheshwari (1980)
- Ahista Ahista as Kaveri (1981)
- Shaukeen as Sita Choudhury (1982)
- Dil-e-Nadaan (1982)
- Namak Halaal as Nisha's mother (1983)
- Love in Goa as Mrs. Merry D'Souza (1983)
- Coolie as Parvati (Nathu's wife) (1983)
- Sadma as Mrs. Malhotra (1983)
- Woh Saat Din (1983) as Maya's mother
- Gupchup Gupchup (1983) Marathi film
- Aaj Ki Awaaz as Mrs. V.V. Deshmukh (1984)
- Sharaabi as Mrs. Kapoor (1984)
- Raaj Tilak (1984)
- All Rounder as Ritu's mom (1984)
- Purana Mandir as Damyanti - Ranvir's sister (1984)
- Navri Mile Navryala (1984) as Mrs. Bhaurao Deshmukh
- Zamana (1985 film) as Sudha S Kumar (1985)
- Sarfarosh as Rani Urmial Devi (1985)
- Karm Yudh (1985) as Geeta Kumar
- Rahi Badal Gaye (1985)
- Wafadaar as Mrs Daya Sagar (1985)
- Yaadon Ki Kasam as Gayatri Kapoor, Ravi's mother and Bishambharnath Kapoor's wife
- Ghar Dwaar as Chanda's mother (1985)
- Pahuchey Huwey Log (1986)
- Ankush as Anita's mom (1986)
- Woh Din Aayega as Sumitra (1987)
- Insaf Ki Pukar as Mrs. Jagannath (1987)
- Watan Ke Rakhwale as Mahavir's mom (1987)
- Marte Dam Tak as Mrs. P.C. Mathur (1987)
- Gammat Jammat as Mrs. Dadasaheb Korde (1987)
- Hatya as Vegetable vendor (1988)
- Jeete Hain Shaan Se as Geeta Verma (1989)
- Farz Ki Jung as Vikram's mom (1989)
- Gair Kanooni as Mrs. Asha Dalal (1989)
- Billoo Badshah as Sumitra - Vijay's mom (1989)
- Daata as Ratanbai (1989)
- Apna Desh Paraye Log (1989)
- Mahaadev as Padma Singh (1989)
- Kamla Ki Maut as Nirmala S. Patel (1989)
- JailKhana (1989)
- Ghayal (1990) as Mrs. Ashok Pradhan
- Bandh Darwaza as Kumar's mother (1990)
- Shaitani Ilaaka (1990)
- Kali Ganga (1990)
- Azaad Desh Ke Gulam as Sharda A. Bhandari (1990)
- Pratigyabadh as Nun (1991)
- Saugandh as Ganga's mom (1991)
- Maherchi Sadi (1991) Marathi film
- Khoon Ka Karz as Judge (1991)
- Jhoothi Shaan as Savitri (1991)
- Zindagi Ek Juaa as Laxmi (1992)
- Kisme Kitna Hai Dum as Lajwanti (1992)
- Humlaa as Mrs. Devkishan Sharma (1992)
- Prem Deewane (1992) as Suman Singh (Ashutosh's mother)
- Insaaf Apne Lahoo Se as Laxmi H. Prasad (Mohan's mother) (1994)
- Fauji as Bansilal's wife (1995)
- Zordaar as Ravi's mom (1996)
- Agni Sakshi as Mrs. Kapoor (1996)
- Daava as Bhishma's mom; Stepmom of Arjun & Suraj (1997)
- Do Ankhen Barah Hath (1997)
- Beti No.1 as Savitri (Priya's mom) ( 2000)
- Police Force: An Inside Story as Revathi (Vijay's mother) (2004)
- Mani Mangalsutra (2010) Marathi film
- One Room Kitchen (2011) Marathi film as Joshi Kaku
- Sunrise (2014) Marathi film as Radhabai (2014)
- Tinhi Sanja (2016) Marathi film
