= Jaan Hatheli Pe =

- Theatrical release poster
- Directed by: Raghunath Jhalani
- Written by: Madan Joshi (dialogues)
- Screenplay by: Naresh Pal
- Story by: Naresh Pal
- Produced by: Sudesh Kumar
- Starring: Dharmendra; Hema Malini; Jeetendra; Rekha; Raj Babbar
- Cinematography: Kamalakar Rao
- Edited by: B. Prasad
- Music by: Laxmikant–Pyarelal
- Production company: Vijaya Shree Pictures
- Release date: 4 September 1987
- Running time: 160 minutes
- Country: India
- Language: Hindi

Jaan Hatheli Pe (transl. Life on Palm) is a 1987 Indian Hindi-language action film produced by Sudesh Kumar under the Vijaya Shree Pictures banner and directed by Raghunath Jhalani. It stars Dharmendra, Hema Malini, Jeetendra, Rekha and Raj Babbar in lead roles and the music was composed by Laxmikant–Pyarelal.

== Cast ==
- Dharmendra as Soni Kapoor
- Hema Malini as Mona Kapoor
- Jeetendra as Ram Kumar Verma
- Rekha as Geeta Verma
- Raj Babbar as Inspector Khan
- Kulbhushan Kharbanda as Shankar Chinoy
- Shakti Kapoor as Rocky
- Ranjeet as Vikram Rastogi
- Madan Puri as Kantawala
- Sharat Saxena as Swamy
- A. K. Hangal as Ram's Father
- Pinchoo Kapoor as Ghnanchand

== Soundtrack ==
Lyrics: Anjaan

Song	Singer
"Chhuo Na, Chhune Do, Chhodo Bhi, Kyun Bhala, Dare Dil"	Kishore Kumar, Asha Bhosle
"Main Ek Ladki Hoon"	Alka Yagnik
"Sai Naam Sumiran Jo Bhi Kare, Yahi Naam Sab Dukh Door Kare"	Anup Jalota, Anuradha Paudwal
"Jaan Hatheli Pe Leke Aaya Tera Deewana"	Shabbir Kumar, Anuradha Paudwal
"Dekha Hai Jab Se, Tab Se Unko Hum Sajda Kar Baithe Hai"	Lata Mangeshkar, Suresh Wadkar
