= Chakravyuha (1978 film) =

- Poster
- Directed by: Basu Chatterjee
- Written by: Jainendra Jain
- Based on: The Thirty-Nine Steps by John Buchan
- Produced by: Yusuf Hassan; Rajesh Khanna
- Starring: Rajesh Khanna; Vinod Mehra; Neetu Singh
- Cinematography: K. K. Mahajan
- Music by: Laxmikant Pyarelal
- Release date: 4 August 1978
- Country: India
- Language: Hindi

Chakravyuha is a 1978 Bollywood thriller film directed by Basu Chatterjee with screenplay by Jainendra Jain. The film stars Rajesh Khanna in the lead role, supported by Neetu Singh, Vinod Mehra, Simple Kapadia, Pradeep Kumar, Om Shivpuri, Dina Pathak, Master Raju Shrestha, Yunuz Parvez, Pinchoo Kapoor and others. Upon release, the film became critically acclaimed. This film was co-produced by Rajesh Khanna with Yusuf Hassan.

== Plot ==
Rajesh Khanna plays a man drawn unwillingly into a nest of enemy spies and intrigue with the future of his country riding on his shoulders. Chhaya (Neetu) and Amit Narayan (Rajesh) are in love and Chhaya wants to get married. Amit doesn't see why they have to get married and wants to keep things as they are. Wedding dates are set and then moved, to her great frustration. This is really their only point of discord. Amit lives alone, and is also very fond of Chhaya's family: father (Om Shivpuri), mother (Dina Pathak), little brother Raju (Master Raju Shrestha) and sister Maya (Rozeena). It is Diwali, and as children burst crackers and set off potentially limb-severing fireworks, Amit's upstairs neighbor Raman (Vinod Mehra) has been watching a group of men in a tent just outside the building's courtyard. They also appear to be keeping tabs on him, and have his manservant in their pay. Now, Raman tosses furniture about the room and loads a pistol and then takes a body out of a trunk, lays it out on the floor, sprinkles it with whiskey and as another set of firecrackers explode outside, he shoots the poor dead guy's face off.

When Amit returns home, Raman is waiting for him and forces his way in. He explains to Amit that he is a spy for India and that he is being watched by enemy agents (he shows the tent and its inhabitants to Amit through the window). He has set up his own suicide (using a morgue body) to throw the enemies off his trail and needs to stay with Amit for a few days in hiding. The unnamed enemy is plotting to destroy India's valuable relationship with an African country called Mazaland by assassinating its Chief Minister when he arrives 19 November at the Delhi International Airport. Raman wants to wait until his enemies hear of his "suicide" and depart before he sets off for Delhi to stop the assassination himself. He shaves his beard and dons thick black glasses to disguise himself and Amit reluctantly agrees to let him stay for a few days. The enemy agents are not put off by the sensational news of Raman's suicide and stay put themselves. The next day, Raman pries the back off his watch; hidden behind the watch face is a teeny-tiny red notebook. He opens it up and begins writing. Amit is meanwhile visiting Chhaya and her family again to talk about wedding details. Amit indulges in room talk with Chaya's family. Chhaya's family is a close and warm family. But when Aman returns home, he gets a shock. Raman has been murdered and Amit's living room turned upside down, and the men in the tent outside have disappeared. Amit wonders what to do next. He has a fantasy about being arrested for murder after calling in the cops. Then he wanders around his room and then makes a cup of tea. In the sugar jar is the not-as-teeny-tiny-as-it-used-to-be red notebook, hidden by Raman. Raman has written down some clues about the gang (known to him only as Z, P, R and M) and their plan to kill the Chief Minister of Mazaland. He begs Amit to stop them himself: to take the notebook with him to Delhi and hand it over to the police there.

Although it was pitch-dark outside moments ago, Amit looks out the window and the sun is shining brightly as the dudhwallah (milkman) approaches on his bicycle. Amit takes off his own clothes very skillfully underneath a towel, and gives the milkman money for his dhoti-kurta—which he somewhat unwillingly gives up. And so Amit's endless journey of swapping outfits and changing clothes begins. The poor milkman finds the grim scene in Amit's living room and calls the police. The police naturally assume that Amit is the culprit and put out an all-points bulletin for his arrest. The rest of the story is full of suspense. Will he make it to Delhi in time? Will he find the enemy's camp and manage to stop the assassination? Can India possibly survive the severing of ties with Mazaland if he doesn't? Who is the real brains behind this plot, anyway? And will he ever set a wedding date with Chhaya?

== Quotes ==
Before the release of the film, director Basu Chatterjee said to Screen India: "If the artiste lives up to that image, I'm satisfied. In Chakravyuh, Kaka has interpreted his role beautifully. I will say this much. If the film flops, I am responsible for it. Khanna has performed very well. He gives me what performance I want very easily within an hour, whereas other actors generally would take around 8 hours to give the same kind of performance as I want. Khanna got more done in one hour than everybody else did in eight."

== Tracks list ==
All songs were written by Anand Bakshi

1. "Shaadi Karne Se Pyaar" : Kishore Kumar, Asha Bhosle
2. "Chal Chal Aage Nikal" : Mohammad Rafi
3. "Chal Chal Aage Nikal Tere Peechhe Bhaage Tera Saaya" v2 - Rafi
4. "Chal Chal Aage Nikal Tere Peechhe Bhaage Tera Saaya" v3 - Rafi
5. "Chal Chal Aage Nikal Tere Peechhe Bhaage Tera Saaya" v4 - Rafi
6. "Chal Chal Aage Nikal Tere Peechhe Bhaage Tera Saaya" v5 - Rafi
7. "Chal Chal Aage Nikal Tere Peechhe Bhaage Tera Saaya" v6 - Rafi

== Cast ==
- Rajesh Khanna as Amit Narayan
- Neetu Singh as Chhaya
- Vinod Mehra as Raman
- Simple Kapadia as Nandita
- Pradeep Kumar as Thakur
- Pinchoo Kapoor as Pinto, Garage Owner
- Yunus Parvez as Sikander
- Om Shivpuri as Chhaya's Father
- A. K. Hangal
- Murad as Inspector General of Police
- Dina Pathak
- Raju Shrestha as Raju, Chhaya's Brother
- Chandrashekar Dubey as Ayurvedic medicine Seller
- Viju Khote as Police Constable
