= Kamla Ki Maut =

- Poster
- Directed by: Basu Chatterjee
- Screenplay by: Basu Chatterjee
- Story by: Swaraj Bandyopadhyay
- Produced by: NFDC
- Starring: Pankaj Kapoor; Supriya Pathak; Roopa Ganguly; Irrfan; Mrinal Kulkarni; Asha Lata; Ashutosh Gowariker
- Cinematography: Ajay Prabhakar
- Edited by: Kamal Saigal
- Music by: Salil Chowdhury
- Release date: 1989
- Running time: 95 minutes
- Country: India
- Language: Hindi

Kamla Ki Maut (Death of Kamla) is a 1989 Hindi drama film directed by Basu Chatterjee. The film set in Mumbai, deals with issue of love, pre-marital sex and relationships in modern India. It stars Pankaj Kapoor, Supriya Pathak, Roopa Ganguly, Irrfan, Mrinal Kulkarni, Asha Lata, Ashutosh Gowariker.

At the 36th Filmfare Awards the film won the Filmfare Award for Best Screenplay for Basu Chatterjee. In 2013, to commemorate 100 years of Indian cinema, National Film Development Corporation of India (NFDC) in partnership with Shemaroo, released a digitally re-mastered print of the film under "Cinemas of India" label.

== Plot ==
The film is set in a lower middle class chawl, an apartment building in Mumbai, a 20-year-old and unmarried Kamla, unable to handle the news of her pregnancy commits suicide. This makes her neighborhood examine their own secrets and the choices they have made in their own lives. The neighbor's family Patel's are badly shattered by the death of Kamla as Sudhakar Patel also has two young daughters of the same age as Kamla, Geeta, and Charu studying with Kamla in college also have boyfriends and some secrets unknown to the family. As Sudhakar and his wife Nirmala come to know that premarital pregnancy is the reason for Kamla's suicide, they went into a flashback, remembering the mistakes made during their younger days.

Nirmala in her teenage fell for her tutor, who was already married and not interested in any relation with his teenage student. He rejected Nirmala's proposal. After Nirmala's suicide attempt, her mother confronts her, as no one knows the truth Nirmala's family fixed her wedding with Sudhakar. At present Nirmala realized that suicide attempt was wrong, as a mother she never wants any of her daughters to choose such an option.

Years ago young Sudhakar meets Anju, they were attracted to each other and decided to get married. They got intimate by having sex, resulting in pregnancy. Anju asks Sudhakar to marry her, but Sudhakar convinced her to abort the child. After the abortion, Sudhakar disappeared from Anju's life. Sudhakar relocated to a new place where he finds new love in village girl Chameli. One day Sudhakar and Chameli caught red-handed while making love. Villagers and Chameli's father ask Sudhakar to marry Chameli as no one will accept her. Sudhakar initially agrees but later got scared because of Chameli's aggressive fiance and threat given by him. Sudhakar disappears from Chameli's life also. Sudhakar gets a new job at the new place. There, he becomes friends with Prakash and his beautiful wife Lakshmi, they spend a good time together. When Prakash goes out of City for an office tour Sudhakar and Lakshmi get closer and developed relation. The night Prakash returned, he caught Sudhakar at his house in half-naked condition, Prakash beat Sudhakar hard. Later, Sudhakar married Nirmala and had two daughters.

Years later when Sudhakar visited his village with his family, he saw Anju also got married and had children, they meet like long-lost friends.

At present, Sudhakar discussing with Nirmala that Anju, whom they met once, also got pregnant before marriage like Kamla, but Anju hide her secret and decided to move on from her mistake and lived a happy life later. Sudhakar tells Nirmala that Kamla's mistake was not about getting pregnant before marriage, but her mistake was to do suicide as there is no life left for her to correct her mistakes or forget it just like how Anju did.

== Cast ==
- Pankaj Kapoor as Sudhakar Patel
- Supriya Pathak as Anju
- Roopa Ganguly as Geeta S. Patel
- Mrinal Kulkarni as Charu S. Patel
- Asha Lata as Nirmala S. Patel
- Ashutosh Gowariker as Deepak
- Ramesh Goel as Nirmala's father
- Devendra Khandelwal as Masterji
- Irrfan Khan as Ajit
- Jaya Mathur as Chameli
- Akhil Mishra as Prakash
- Kavita Thakur as Kamla

== Production ==
The film was shot at Gopal Bhawan, a residential building at Mangalwadi in Girgaum, besides Natraj Studio and R. K. Studio in Mumbai.
