= Apne Paraye =

- Directed by: Basu Chatterjee
- Screenplay by: Basu Chatterjee
- Based on: Nishkriti by Sarat Chandra Chattopadhyay
- Produced by: Mushir Alam
- Starring: Amol Palekar; Shabana Azmi
- Cinematography: K. K. Mahajan
- Edited by: V.N. Mayekar
- Music by: Bappi Lahiri
- Production company: M. R. Productions
- Distributed by: M. R. Productions
- Release date: 8 August 1980
- Running time: 123 minutes
- Country: India
- Language: Hindi

Apne Paraye (transl. Relatives and Others) is a 1980 Indian Hindi-language drama film directed by Basu Chatterjee and produced by Mushir Alam. It stars Amol Palekar and Shabana Azmi in pivotal roles. It is based on the 1917 Bengali novel, Nishkriti by Sarat Chandra Chattopadhyay

Ashalata, who made her Hindi film debut with the film, was nominated for the Filmfare Award for Best Supporting Actress.

== Plot ==
This is a tale of family dynamics of a joint family.

This is a story of two lawyer brothers Advocate and Harish, their cousin Chandranath (son of their father's brother), their wives and children. Siddheshwari, wife of the eldest brother has left the operational details of the household to Sheela, wife of the half-brother Chander. Chander is a happy go lucky musician, who fails in successive business ventures (like selling mustard oil. He lost Rs 8000 in selling rice and jute previously. He wants another rs 6000 for the mustard oil business). Sheela ensures that the household runs smoothly, while Siddheshwari is the fount of love and affection in the joint household.

Chander has kids Ramu, Pappu, Kanhaiya. Neela Siddheshwari's daughter and Mahendra plus Hari are her sons.

Harish and his spouse Naintara rejoin the household. Atul is their son. Naintara gets expensive clothes for Atul and expects Siddheshwari to pay for them. Naintara wants control over the house money, but the house keys have been entrusted to Sheela. Atul makes fun of the way Hari dresses and Sheela scolds him badly. Naintara is offended, but Siddheshwari won't say a word. Naintara complains to Siddheshwari that she will escalate the matter to Harish. Siddheshwari is alarmed and calls Sheela and scold her for her behavior. Sheela shows maturity, apologizes to Naintara and organizes a party for Atul.

But Atul is also offended that Sheela yelled at him and is no mood to compromise. Atul enters the kitchen with his shoes on and won't back down when Sheela asks him to get out. When Atul starts insulting Sheela, Mahendra intervenes, and a fight breaks out between Atul and Mahendra. Harish tries to intervene and tells Sheela to come to him if she has a problem with Atul. Siddheshwari shuts up Harish by saying that in that case, he should bring all complaints against Sheela to her. This is a women's matter and asks him to back down.

Naintara & Harish decide to leave the house, but Siddheshwari tells them to stay. Naintara says that Sheela has told all the kids to ignore Atul and that is unacceptable. Siddheshwari asks the kids, who tell her that until Atul apologizes to Sheela, they will ignore him. Siddheshwari is convinced at Naintara's allegations. When Siddheshwari confronts Sheela, she says Atul is a spoiled brat and she will not allow any kid of the house to be influenced by him. Siddheshwari speaks to Sheela alone, but she refuses to budge. Siddheshwari gets angry and says that she cannot ask her blood relation (Hairsh & Naintara) to leave the house for the fear of society opinion. Siddheshwari escalates the matter to Advocate and tells him that Chander needs to start earning his share around the house.

Due to this insult, Sheela stops speaking to Siddheshwari, but continues to perform all her duties around the house. Naintara sweet talks Siddheshwari and tries to take over the kitchen. She gets Siddheshwari to admit that they are blood relations and need to care for each other. Sheela is hurt even further. But even Siddheshwari knows that she is saying these things to make Naintara happy and doesn't really believe in them.

Advocate tries to handle the situation in his own way. He scolds Chander in front of Harish for being a failure at Mustard business but gives him Rs 10,000 more to start the sawdust business. But Harish tells Advocate that he should not destroy another Rs 10,000 on Chander as he doesn't know anything about business. Advocate is convinced and asks Chander to start teaching the kids as the teacher also charges Rs 50/month.

Despite the coldness, Siddheshwari pines for Sheela's care and warmth, which she never gets from Naintara. One day Harish brings Rs 500 from his work. Naintara gives this money to Siddheshwari and makes her point that Harish is contributing to the house, but Chander is not. Sheela is so hurt that she gives back the house keys to Siddheshwari. Siddheshwari is also hurt at Sheela throwing the keys at her and asks Sheela when she is leaving the house, and how much money she has stolen already. Sheela decides to leave the house and tells Chander that they will stay in the village house from now on. Siddheshwari believes that Sheela will not leave if she doesn't allow her to touch her feet, and shuts the door. Sheela pays her respects at the doorstep and leaves with her family.

Chander and Sheela reach the village house with their kids, where Manohar Lal (Manik Dutt) was the sole caretaker of the property. Manohar was in charge of growing crops on the family land, but he was selling a portion of the produce on the side and profiting personally from it, without declaring that income to the family.

To get rid of Chander, Manohar decides to stop sending money to Calcutta, and plans to create a hue and cry in front of Advocate that Chander has decided to take over the farms himself. Meanwhile, Manohar asks Chander that the repair of the house is due and asks Chander to visit Advocate and ask for money. Advocate gives Rs 1000. Manohar now meets Harish and tells him that Chander has ordered not to send any money to Calcutta. Harish sends a letter to Chander to vacate the house. Chander and Sheela shift into a hut in front of the house but refuse to go back to Calcutta. Chander also decides not to use the farm income for home repairs. Chander and Sheela decide not to respond to Harish's letter. Harish takes this as a declaration of war and proceeds with a court case against Chander.

Harish even sends the police to search for stolen money in Chander's possession. Siddheshwari is alarmed at these allegations but backs off when even her husband calls Chander a thief. Meanwhile, Manohar tells the village grocer to stop giving supplies to Chander on credit. Sheela starts selling her jewels to keep the house going. Siddheshwari is very close to Pappu and senses that he is not well. This is when Pappu is indeed very sick. She tells the advocate to go to the village and check on the family.

Advocate reaches the village and finds Pappu was indeed sick. He was not aware that Chander was fighting a case that Harish had started against him. He also finds that Chander and his family stay in a hut opposite the family house. He finds that Sheela has sold off all her jewels. Sheela breaks down saying that Chander always followed the orders given to him. He came to the village and stayed in the servant's quarters. He was accused of falsehoods and even a police search was conducted against him. He fired Manohar since he caught him stealing from the family farms and income. Advocate is heartbroken and transfers all the property to Sheela. As a result, Harish loses the case in court. Harish decides to go back to Patna with his family. Advocate brings Chander and his family back from the village. Siddheshwari thanks advocate for fixing her family. Advocate knew that Chander was depositing all the property income in advocate's bank account, and that Manohar was stealing from them, and Chander fired him.

== Cast ==
- Amol Palekar...Chandranath
- Shabana Azmi...Sheila
- Girish Karnad...Harish
- Utpal Dutt...Advocate
- Ashalata Wabgaonkar...Sidheshwari
- Bharati Achrekar...Naintara
- Radhika....Neela

== Soundtrack ==
The music of the film was composed by Bappi Lahiri, while lyrics were penned by Yogesh.

Song	Singer
"Kaise Din Jeevan Mein Aaye"	Kishore Kumar
"Gaao Mere Man, Chaahe Suraj Chamke Re"	Asha Bhosle, K. J. Yesudas
"Shyam Rang Ranga Re"	K. J. Yesudas
"Halke Halke Aayi Chalke"	Lata Mangeshkar
