= Dillagi (1978 film) =

1978 film

- Poster
- Directed by: Basu Chatterjee
- Written by: Basu Chatterjee
- Screenplay by: Basu Chatterjee, Keka Chatterjee
- Story by: Bimal Kar
- Produced by: Bikram Singh Dehal, Kanwar Ajit Singh
- Starring: Dharmendra; Hema Malini
- Cinematography: K. K. Mahajan
- Edited by: V. N. Mayekar
- Music by: Rajesh Roshan; Yogesh (lyrics)
- Release date: 1978 (India)
- Country: India
- Language: Hindi

Dillagi is a 1978 romantic comedy directed by Basu Chatterjee, based on the Bengali novella "Kalidas O Chemistry" by Bimal Kar. It stars Dharmendra as Swarn Kamal - a newly appointed Sanskrit professor in a girls' college. Hema Malini is a strict Chemistry lecturer (Phoolrenu) and warden of the same college.

== Synopsis ==
Phoolrenu has been nicknamed "carbon dioxide" and Swarnkamal is lovingly called "jijaji" by the girls. While for Swarnkamal it is love at first sight, Phoolrenu detests him due to his style of teaching the works of Mahakavi (Great Poet) Kalidas.

From the celebrations of the festival Holi to the annual function, all attempts of Swarnkamal to win over Phoolrenu seem to be having an opposite effect. He then visits Phoolrenu during the summer vacations at her hometown of Kashipur and finally makes some headway, but Phoolrenu wants him to approach her through a proper channel by responding to her matrimonial advertisement in a newspaper.

But confusion reigns and Phoolrenu's marriage is fixed with someone else. Swarnkamal tries to reach Kashipur and faces a number of difficulties one after the other. Meanwhile, Phoolrenu and her brother tries to think of ways to get out of the marriage agreement. In the climax, Swarnkamal somehow manages to reach the wedding ceremony but is unable to stop it as the groom's henchmen mistake his identity as someone sent by groom's girlfriend to stop the wedding. Swarnkamal watches the groom seemingly leave with Phoolrenu and returns to his sister's house, defeated. But here, it is revealed that Phool and her brother actually managed to snuck in groom's girlfriend into the wedding ceremony and now he is married to her. Phoolrenu herself is waiting for Swarnkamal at his sister's house. They decide to not rush into the wedding and Phool tells Swarnkamal that she will write to him about the actual date of their wedding once he applies for leave in the college. As a gesture of love, she tries to copy a love letter out of a book that Swarnkamal had secretly passed on to her during Holi. On their wedding night, Swarnkamal reveals that he was the one who passed on the book to her and knows that she copied the letter from there. The couple have a laugh and the movie ends with them embracing each other, deeply in love.

== Cast ==
- Dharmendra – Swarn Kamal
- Hema Malini – Phoolrenu
- Mithu Mukherjee – Geeta, English Lecturer
- Devan Verma – Gopal Krishan Choudhry
- Asrani – Ramesh
- Preeti Ganguly – Charu, Student
- Keshto Mukherjee – Tonga (horse-coach) driver
- Shatrughan Sinha – Advocate Shekhar
- Guffi Paintal – Ganesh
- Urmila Bhatt – Ramesh's mother
- Lalita Kumari – Principal
- Dulari – Ganga
- Brahmachari – Mini-bus driver
- Kajri – Usha
- Anjali Paigankar – Shobha
- Poornima Jairam

== Credits ==
- Director – Basu Chatterjee
- Producer – Bikram Singh Dehal, Kanwar Ajit Singh
- Screenplay – Basu Chatterjee, Keka Chatterjee
- Dialogue – Basu Chatterjee
- Cinematographer – K. K. Mahajan
- Editor – V. N. Mayekar
- Art Director – Jadhav Bhattacharya
- Costumes Designer – Leena Daru, Tulsiram Nipane
- Action Director – Ravi Khanna
- Choreographer – Satyanarayan
- Music Director – Rajesh Roshan
- Lyricist – Yogesh
- Playback Singers – Kishore Kumar, Lata Mangeshkar, Nitin Mukesh, Suman Kalyanpur

== Soundtrack ==
All lyrics are written by Yogesh; all music is composed by Rajesh Roshan.

No.	Title	Singer(s)	Length
1.	"Baadal To Aaye"	Lata Mangeshkar
2.	"Rang Rejwa Tu Rang"	Kishore Kumar, Suman Kalyanpur
3.	"Main Kaun Sa Geet"	Lata Mangeshkar
4.	"Prem Hai Prem Hai"	Lata Mangeshkar, Nitin Mukesh
