= Michael Madhusudhan =

- Directed by: Madhu Bose
- Written by: Madhu Bose
- Produced by: Mani Guha
- Starring: Utpal Dutt; Ahindra Choudhury
- Cinematography: G.K. Mehta
- Edited by: Shyam Das
- Music by: Chitta Roy
- Release date: 1950
- Country: India
- Language: Bengali

Michael Madhusudhan is a 1950 Indian Bengali language biographical drama film written and directed by Madhu Bose. This film is based on the life of Michael Madhusudan Dutt. Uppal Dutt played Michael Madhusudan Dutt's role.

== Cast ==
- Utpal Dutt as Michael Madhusudan Dutt
- Devjani as Henrita
- Miriam Stark as Rebeca
- Ahindra Choudhury as Rajnarayan Dutta
- Molina Devi as Jahnabi Devi
- Abhinas Das as Vidyasagar
