= Ek Ruka Hua Faisla =

- DVD Cover
- Directed by: Basu Chatterjee
- Written by: Ranjit Kapur (dialogues)
- Screenplay by: Ranjit Kapur; Basu Chatterjee
- Produced by: Basu Chatterjee
- Starring: See below
- Cinematography: Ajay Prabhakar
- Edited by: Kamal A. Sehgal
- Music by: Basu Chakravarti
- Release date: 1986 (India)
- Running time: 117 minutes
- Country: India
- Language: Hindi

Ek Ruka Hua Faisla (English: A Pending Decision) is a 1986 Indian Hindi-language legal drama film directed by Basu Chatterjee. It is a remake of the Golden Bear winning American motion picture 12 Angry Men (1957) directed by Sidney Lumet, which was an adaptation from a 1954 teleplay of the same name by Reginald Rose.

== Plot ==
The story begins in a courtroom where a teenage boy from a city slum is on trial for stabbing his father to death. Final closing arguments have been presented, and the judge then instructs the jury to decide whether the boy is guilty of murder, which carries a mandatory death sentence. Once inside the jury discussion room, it is immediately apparent that all jurors with the sole exception of juror Number 8 have already decided that the boy is guilty, and that they plan to return their verdict quickly, without taking time for discussion. His vote annoys the other jurors.

The rest of the film revolves around the jury's difficulty in reaching a unanimous verdict. While several of the jurors harbor personal prejudices, juror 8 maintains that the evidence presented in the case is circumstantial, and that the boy deserves fair deliberation. He calls into question the accuracy and reliability of the only two witnesses to the murder, the rarity of the murder weapon, and the overall questionable circumstances. He further argues that he cannot, in good conscience, vote guilty when he feels there is reasonable doubt of the boy's guilt and slowly convinces each juror about the same by his logical findings around each piece of evidence.

== Cast ==
SN	Played By	Role Played
1	Deepak Qazir Kejriwal	Juror no. 1
2	Amitabh Srivastava	Juror no. 2
3	Pankaj Kapur	Juror no. 3
4	Sayed Mohammed Zaheer	Juror no. 4
5	Subhash Udgata	Juror no. 5
6	Hemant Mishra	Juror no. 6
7	Maharaj Krishen Raina	Juror no. 7
8	K. Krishen Raina	Juror no. 8
9	Annu Kapoor	Juror no. 9
10	Subbiraj Kakkar	Juror no. 10
11	Shailendra Goel	Juror no. 11
12	Aziz M. Qureshi	Juror no. 12
13	C D Sindhu	Guard
