= Sudha Shivpuri =

Actress

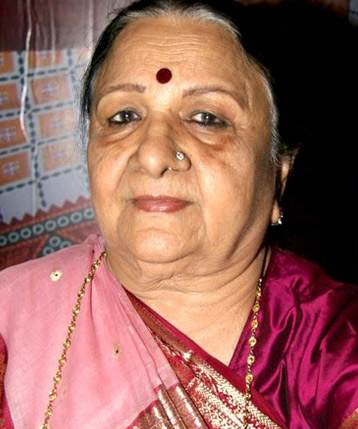
- Born: 14 July 1937; Indore, Indore State, British India
- Died: 20 May 2015 (aged 77); Mumbai, Maharashtra, India
- Other name: Meetu Amba
- Years active: 1964–2015
- Spouse: Om Shivpuri (m. 1968; died 1990)
- Children: 2, including Ritu Shivpuri

Sudha Shivpuri (14 July 1937 – 20 May 2015) was an Indian actress who was most famous for her role as Baa in the Hindi TV serial Kyunki Saas Bhi Kabhi Bahu Thi (2000–2008).

== Early life and career ==
Brought up in Rajasthan, Sudha Shivpuri started her career early, when she was in the eighth standard in school. Her father had died, and her mother had fallen ill, thus the onus of earning a living for the family fell on her.

She is an alumna of National School of Drama graduating in 1963 along with Om Shivpuri. They later got married in 1968 and continued work in Delhi theatre. They formed their own theatre company, Dishantar, which produced several important contemporary plays, including Aadhe Adhurey, Tughlaq, and Vijay Tendulkar's Khamosh! Adalat Jari Hai in which she played the lead role, all directed by Om Shivpuri.

In 1974, she shifted to Mumbai, as her husband had started getting many offers for Hindi films.

She made her film debut with Basu Chatterjee's Swami in 1977 and went on to act in films like Insaaf Ka Tarazu, Hamari Bahu Alka, "Hum Dono (1985)", Sawan Ko Aane Do, Sun Meri Laila, The Burning Train, Vidhaata and Maya Memsaab (1993).

Thereafter she took a break from films and shifted to television, where she acted in a few serials like Aa Bail Mujhe Maar and Rajni (1985), in which she played Priya Tendulkar's mother-in-law.

After the death of her husband in 1990, she started acting again and went on to do many TV serials, including Missing, Rishtey, Sarhadein and Bandhan. Her big break in television came in 2000, when she was asked to perform the role of 'Baa', the old mother-in-law, in the TV serial Kyunki Saas Bhi Kabhi Bahu Thi.

She has done many other Television shows like Sheeshe Ka Ghar, Waqt Ka Dariya, Daman, Santoshi Ma, Yeh Ghar, Kasamh Se, Kis Desh Mein Hai Meraa Dil, in all these serials, the role of Shivpuri's 'Ba' was very famous and Sudha gained a new identity as 'Ba' in public.

In 2003 she acted in the Hindi film Pinjar, based on Amrita Pritam's famous partition novel.

She was awarded the Sangeet Natak Akademi Award in 2009 for her Acting in Theatre, given by the Sangeet Natak Akademi, India's National Academy of Music, Dance & Drama.

== Personal life ==
Sudha Shivpuri was the wife of veteran actor Om Shivpuri. The couple had two children, a son, Vineet Shivpuri, and a daughter, Ritu Shivpuri, who is also a film actor. Sudha Shivpuri had suffered a heart attack in 2014 and was not doing well for some time. She died from multiple organ failure on 20 May 2015 in Mumbai.

== Awards and honours ==
- In 2009, she received the Sangeet Natak Akademi Award.
