= Sara Aakash =

Sara Akash
- Directed by: Basu Chatterjee
- Written by: Basu Chatterjee (screenplay), Kamleshwar (dialogue); Rajendra Yadav (story)
- Based on: 'सारा आकाश', Novel by Rajendra Yadav
- Produced by: Basu Chatterjee
- Starring: Rakesh Pandey; Madhu Chakravarty, Nandita Thakur, A. K. Hangal, Dina Pathak, Mani Kaul, Tarla Mehta, Shaily Shailendra, Jalal Agha, Aarti Bole
- Cinematography: K. K. Mahajan
- Edited by: Ishwar Chandra; Ashok Gaind
- Music by: Salil Choudhury
- Production company: Cineye Films
- Release date: 1969
- Running time: 82 minutes
- Country: India
- Language: Hindi

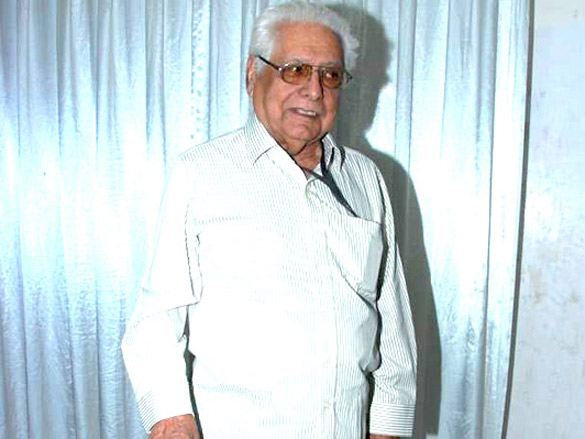

Sara Aakash (English: The Whole Sky) is a 1969 Hindi film directed by Basu Chatterjee, based on first part of novel Sara Akash (The whole Cosmos, 1951) by Rajendra Yadav. This was Yadav's debut novel, originally published as Pret Bolte Hain (Ghosts Speak), renamed in 1960, the title in turn was taken from a poem by Ramdhari Singh Dinkar. The film starred Rakesh Pandey, Madhu Chakravarty, Nandita Thakur, A. K. Hangal and Dina Pathak in lead roles. Set in a traditional middle class joint family in Agra, the film deals with internal conflicts of a newly wed couple, both of whom find themselves unprepared for domestic life.

The film marked the debut of Basu Chatterjee as director, and was also the first film of cinematographer K. K. Mahajan, who won the National Film Award for Best Cinematography for his black-and-white camera work in the film. Along with Uski Roti and Bhuvan Shome other notable films of the year, it is regarded as one of the films which started the Indian New Wave.

== Plot ==
Agra-based collegian, Samar Thakur (Rakesh Pandey), lives in a joint family consisting of his father (A. K. Hangal), mother (Dina Pathak), brother Amar (film director Mani Kaul, in his only major acting role) and his wife; as well as a married sister, Munni, estranged from her husband. His parents force him to marry Prabha (Madhu Chakravarty), a matriculate, much to his chagrin as this interferes with his future plans. The marriage does take place, and he soon finds that he is not only incompatible with her, she was well versed in household chores. Leading to arguments, abuse and neglect, which may result in the end of this marriage.

== Cast ==
- Rakesh Pandey - Samar Thakur
- Madhu Chakravarty as Prabha S. Thakur, Wife of Samar Thakur
- A. K. Hangal - Mr. Thakur aka 'Babuji'
- Dina Pathak - Mrs. Thakur aka 'Amma'
- Mani Kaul - Amar Thakur, eldest son of Mr. Thakur
- Tarla Mehta - 'Bhabhi', Wife of Amar Thakur
- Nandita Thakur as Munni, Daughter of Mr. Thakur
- Shaily Shailendra - Pandit
- Jalal Agha as Diwakar, Samar's close friend
- Aarti Bole as Kiran, Wife of Diwakar

== Production ==
The film was shot on location in Agra, and in Rajendra Yadav's old family house in Raja Ki Mandi area, Agra. In his foreword to the second edition of the novel, Yadav relates how it was a thrilling experience to go around the house with the director and cinematographer. Mahajan said to Chatterjee that the house was a "ready-made set", better than anything that could be built in Bombay. Yadav offered to make it available for the shooting.

== Awards ==
- K. K. Mahajan received the 1969 National Film Award for Best Cinematography.
- Basu Chatterjee received the 1972 Filmfare Best Screenplay Award.

== Critical reception ==
Sara Akash was one of the films featured in Avijit Ghosh's book, 40 Retakes: Bollywood Classics You May Have Missed.

The making of Sara Akash has been covered in a lot of detail in Anirudha Bhattacharjee's book, Basu Chatterji: And Middle of the road cinema (Penguin Random House, 2023). It has extensive and exclusive interviews with Basu Chatterji, and all the living members of the cast, including Madhuchhanda Chakrabarty, Rakesh Pandey, Nandita Thakur, Rachana Yadav (progeny of Rajendra Yadav and Mannu Bhandari), Assistant director Ramesh Gupta, people from Agra who were associated with the shoot, among others.
