= Manzil (1979 film) =

- Poster
- Directed by: Basu Chatterjee
- Written by: Ashish Burman; Basu Chatterjee
- Produced by: Jai Pawar; Raj Prakash; Rajiv Suri
- Starring: Amitabh Bachchan; Moushumi Chatterjee
- Cinematography: K. K. Mahajan
- Edited by: G.G. Mayekar
- Music by: R. D. Burman
- Release date: 28 September 1979
- Running time: 114 minutes
- Country: India
- Language: Hindi

Manzil (lit. 'Destination') is a 1979 Indian Hindi-language romantic drama film directed by Basu Chatterjee. The film is a remake of the 1965 Bengali film Akash Kusum. Manzil stars Amitabh Bachchan and Moushumi Chatterjee in pivotal roles. Filming was intermittent between 1972 and 1979, when it was finally released. The film won critical acclaim for its story, while Bachchan was praised for his performance. The song Rimjhim Gire Saawan was a chartbuster, and the picturization of Lata Mangeshkar's version of the song that was shot in real rain in Mumbai made it a perennial favorite.

== Plot ==
Ajay Chandra, a young man, has big dreams. He falls for Aruna Khosla, a rich girl. She also reciprocates his feelings. He pretends to be rich not to disappoint her and takes help from his friend Prakash Mariwalla who was a Chartered Accountant, for suit, car and flat, claiming all as his own. He wants to start a galvanometer business by buying old ones and refurbishing them to workable ones with the help of Anokhelal. Unfortunately, the big cats try to buy him out, but Ajay doesn't budge. So, they buy Anokhelal by bribing him with money for his daughters wedding.

This leads to a big failure for Ajay, whose mother Mrs. Chandra has to give the insurance money to her son to bail him out. But since Anokhelal is not working for him, Ajay is not able to supply the products, and his client approaches his lawyer, who happens to be Aruna's father, Mr. Khosla, who wants to teach Ajay a lesson for gaslighting his daughter and thus takes the case on quickly. Ajay confesses to Aruna, but is kicked out their house by her father.

In the meantime Mrs. Chandra encourages her son to repair the galvanometers himself and when he falls short of money, sells her gold jewellery. Ajay puts in a lot of effort to learn how to fix the Galvanometer. His friend C.A Prakash Mariwalla also helps him with ten thousand rupees in disguise of an order.

In court, Ajay's defending lawyer proves that Ajay was actually a victim of a plot by bigger businessmen who wanted to profit by making Ajay a scapegoat. And then the prosecutor withdraws the case as the galvanometers are now repaired and the client no longer wants to pursue the case.

== Cast ==
- Amitabh Bachchan as Ajay Chandra
- Moushumi Chatterjee as Aruna Khosla
- Rakesh Pandey as Prakash Mariwala
- Satyen Kappu as Advocate Khosla
- Urmila Bhatt as Mrs. Khosla
- Lalita Pawar as Mrs. Chandra
- Shreeram Lagoo as Advocate Kapoor
- A. K. Hangal as Anokhelal
- C. S. Dubey as Tolaram Chhaganmal

== Soundtrack ==
The music of the movie was written by R. D. Burman and the lyrics were written by lyricist Yogesh.

Song	Singer	Raga
"Tum Ho Mere Dil Ki Dhadkan"	Kishore Kumar	
"Rimjhim Gire Sawan" (Male)	Kishore Kumar	Kirwani
"Rimjhim Gire Sawan" (Female)	Lata Mangeshkar	Kirwani
"Man Mera Chahe"	Asha Bhosle	
