= Utpal Dutt =

Indian actor, director, playwright (1929–1993)

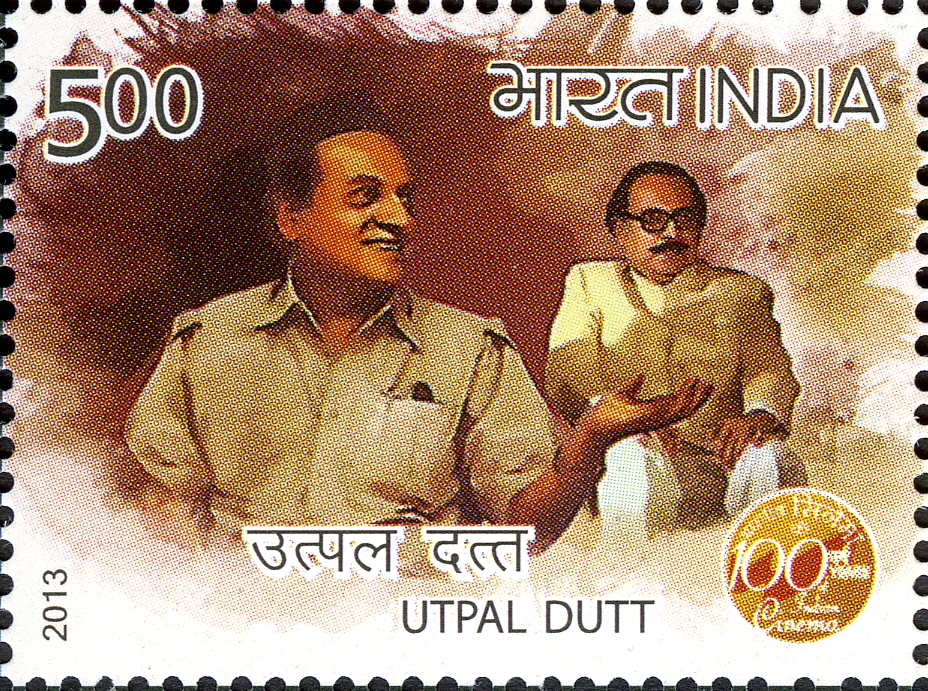
- Dutt on a 2013 stamp of India
- Born: 29 March 1929; Barishal, Bengal Presidency, British India (now Barisal, Bangladesh)
- Died: 19 August 1993 (aged 64); Tollygunge, Calcutta, West Bengal, India
- Other name: Utpal Dutta
- Education: St. Xavier's College, Calcutta
- Occupations: Actor, director, writer-playwright
- Years active: 1947–1993
- Works: Filmography
- Spouse: Shobha Sen (m. 1960)
- Children: 1
- Awards: Full list

Utpal Dutt (29 March 1929 – 19 August 1993) was an Indian actor, director, and writer-playwright. He was primarily an actor in Bengali theatre, where he became a pioneering figure in Modern Indian theatre, when he founded the "Little Theatre Group" in 1949. This group enacted many English, Shakespearean and Brecht plays, in a period now known as the "Epic theatre" period, before it immersed itself completely in highly political and radical theatre. His plays became an apt vehicle for the expression of his Marxist ideologies, visible in socio-political plays such as Kallol (1965), Manusher Adhikar, Louha Manob (1964), Tiner Toloar and Maha-Bidroha. He also acted in over 100 Bengali and Hindi films in a career spanning 40 years, and remains most known for his roles in films such as Mrinal Sen’s Bhuvan Shome (1969), Satyajit Ray’s Agantuk (1991), Gautam Ghose’s Padma Nadir Majhi (1992) and Hrishikesh Mukherjee's breezy Hindi comedies such as Gol Maal (1979) and Rang Birangi (1983). He also did the role of a sculptor, Sir Digindra Narayan, in the episode Seemant Heera of Byomkesh Bakshi (TV series) on Doordarshan in 1993, shortly before his death.

He received National Film Award for Best Actor in 1970 and three Filmfare Best Comedian Awards. In 1990, the Sangeet Natak Akademi, India's National Academy of Music, Dance and Theatre, awarded him its highest award, the Sangeet Natak Akademi Fellowship for lifetime contribution to theatre.

== Early life and education ==
Utpal Dutta was born into a Bengali Kayastha family on 29 March 1929 in Barisal. His father was Girijaranjan Dutta. After initial schooling at St. Edmund's School, Barisal, he completed Matriculation from St. Xavier's Collegiate School, Calcutta in 1945. He graduated with English Literature Honours from St. Xavier's College, Calcutta, University of Calcutta in 1949.

== Career ==
Though he was active primarily in Bengali theatre, he started his career in English theatre. As a teenager in the 1940s, he developed his passion and craft in English theatre, which resulted in the establishment of "The Shakespeareans" in 1947. Its first performance was a powerful production of Shakespeare's Richard III, with Dutt playing the king. This so impressed Geoffrey Kendal and Laura Kendal (parents of the actress Jennifer Kendal), who led the itinerant "Shakespeareana Theatre Company", that they immediately hired him, and he did two year-long tours with them (first 1947–49 and later 1953–54) across India and Pakistan, enacting Shakespeare's plays; and was acclaimed for his passionate portrayal of Othello. After the Kendals left India for the first time in 1949, Utpal Dutt renamed his group the "Little Theatre Group" (LTG), and over the next three years continued to perform and produce plays by Ibsen, Shaw, Tagore, Gorky and Konstantin Simonov. The group later decided to stage exclusively Bengali plays and to eventually evolve into a production company that would produce several Bengali movies. He also remained an active member of Gananatya Sangha, which performed through rural areas of West Bengal.

He was also a member of Indian People's Theatre Association (IPTA), an organisation known for its leftist leaning. He joined the Bengal unit of IPTA in 1950, but left it the following year, when he started his theatre group, the People's Little Theatre. He wrote and directed what he called "Epic Theatre", a term he borrowed from Bertolt Brecht, to bring about discussion and change in Bengal. His Brecht Society, formed in 1948, was presided by Satyajit Ray. He became one of the most influential personalities in the Group Theatre movement. While accepting Brecht's belief of the audience being "co-authors" of the theatre, he rejected orthodoxies of "Epic theatre" as being impractical in India. He also remained a teacher of English at the South Point School in Kolkata.

Soon he would turn to his native Bengali, producing translations of several Shakespearean tragedies and the works of Russian classicists into Bengali. Starting in 1954, he wrote and directed controversial Bengali political plays, and also Maxim Gorky's Lower Depths in Bengali in 1957. In 1959, the LTG secured the lease of Minerva Theatre, Kolkata, where most notably Angar (Coal) (1959), based on the exploitation of coal-miners was showcased. For the next decade the group staged several plays here, with him as an impresario, and he still is remembered as one of the last pioneering actor-managers of Indian theatre. He also formed groups like Arjo Opera and Bibek Yatra Samaj.

Meanwhile, his transition to films happened while performing the role of Othello, when famous filmmaker Madhu Bose happened to be watching, and gave him the lead in his film Michael Madhusudhan (1950), based on the life of the revolutionary Indian poet Michael Madhusudan Dutt. Later, he himself wrote a play on the fragmented colonial psyche of Michael Madhusudan Dutt, and the ambivalence of swaying between "colonial" admiration and "anti-colonial" revolt. He went on to act in many Bengali films, including many films by Satyajit Ray.

Dutt was also an extremely famous comic actor in Hindi cinema, though he acted in only a handful of Hindi films. He acted in comedy movies, the most notable ones being Guddi, Gol Maal, Naram Garam, Rang Birangi and Shaukeen. He received Filmfare Best Comedian Award for Golmaal, Naram Garam and Rang Birangi. He appeared in Bhuvan Shome, (for which he was awarded the National Film Award for Best Actor), Ek Adhuri Kahani and Chorus, all by Mrinal Sen; Agantuk, Jana Aranya, Joi Baba Felunath and Hirak Rajar Deshe, by Satyajit Ray; Paar and Padma Nadir Majhi, by Gautam Ghose; Bombay Talkie, The Guru, and Shakespeare Wallah, by James Ivory; Jukti Takko Aar Gappo, by Ritwik Ghatak; Guddi, Gol Maal, Naram Garam and Kotwal Saab by Hrishikesh Mukherjee; Shaukeen, Priyatama and Hamari Bahu Alka directed by Basu Chatterjee and Amanush, Anand Ashram and Barsaat Ki Ek Raat by Shakti Samanta.

Utpal Dutt also played the main villain characters in some of the major Amitabh Bachchan starrers such as The Great Gambler, Inquilaab and the bilingual Hindi/Bangla movie Barsaat Ki Ek Raat. In fact, Utpal Dutt was the hero (main lead) in Amitabh Bachchan's maiden venture Saat Hindustani.

"Revolutionary theatre is essentially people's theatre, which means it must be played before the masses,.."

— Utpal Dutt

Dutt was also a lifelong Marxist and an active supporter of the Communist Party of India (Marxist), and his leftist "Revolutionary Theatre" was a phenomenon in the contemporary Bengali theatre. He staged many street dramas in favour of the Communist Party. He was jailed by the Congress government in West Bengal in 1965 and detained for several months, as the then state government feared that the subversive message of his play Kallol (Sound of the Waves), (based on the Royal Indian Navy Mutiny of 1946, which ran packed shows at Calcutta's Minerva Theatre), might provoke anti-government protests in West Bengal. The play turned out to be his longest-running play at the Minerva. Manusher Adhikare (Of People's Rights) in 1968, staged as a documentary drama, was a new genre in Bengali theatre before, though it turned out to be his last production of the group at the Minerva, as they soon left the theatre. Thereafter, the group was given the name the "People's Little Theatre"; as it took on yet another new direction, his work came closer to the people, and this phase played an important role in popularising Indian street theatre, as he started performing at street-corners or "poster" plays, in open spaces, without any aid or embellishment, before enormous crowds. The year also marked his transition into Jatra or Yatra Pala, a Bengali folk drama form, performed largely across rural West Bengal. He started writing Jatra scripts, produced and acted in them, even formed his own Jatra troupe. His jatra political dramas were often produced on open-air stages and symbolised his commitment to communist ideology, and today form his lasting legacy.

Through the 1970s three of his plays; Barricade, Dusswapner Nagari (City of Nightmares) and Ebaar Rajar Pala (Now it is the King's turn), drew crowds despite being officially banned.

He wrote Louha Manab (The Iron Man), in 1964 while still in jail, based on a real trial against a pro-Stalin, ex-Politburo member by supporters of Nikita Khrushchev in Moscow of 1963. It was first staged at Alipore Jail in 1965, by the People's Little Theatre. His stay in jail unleashed a new period of rebellious and politically charged plays, including Tiner Toloar (The Tin Sword), partially based on Pygmalion, Dushapner Nagari (Nightmare City), Manusher Odhikare (Rights Of Man), based on the Scottsboro Boys case, protests against the racial discrimination and injustice of the Scottsborough trial of 1931, Surya-Shikar (Hunting the Sun) (1978), Maha-Bidroha (The Great Rebellion) (1989), and Laal Durgo (Red Fort) (1990) about the demise of Communism, set in a fictitious East European country, and Janatar Aphim (Opiate of the People), (1990) lamented on Indian political parties exploiting religion for gain. In all, he wrote twenty-two full-length plays, fifteen poster plays, nineteen Jatra scripts, acted in thousands of shows, and directed more than sixty productions, apart from writing serious studies of Shakespeare, Girish Ghosh, Stanislavsky, Brecht, and revolutionary theatre, and translating Shakespeare and Brecht.

He also directed a number of films such as Megh (1961), a psychological thriller, Ghoom Bhangar Gaan (1965), Jhar (Storm) (1979), based on the Young Bengal movement, Baisakhi Megh (1981), Maa (1983) and Inquilab Ke Baad (1984).

== Legacy ==
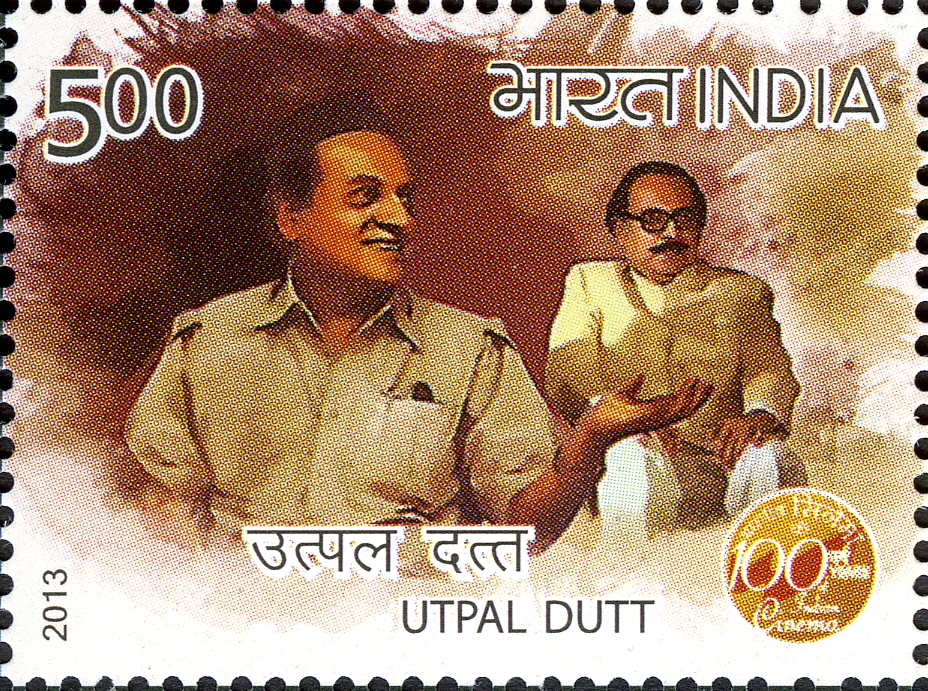
Dutt in 2013 stamp of India.

Forty years after the staging of the classic play Kallol which entails the story of the mutiny of Indian sailors against the British on the Arabian Sea, for which he was even imprisoned, was revived in 2005, as Gangabokshe Kallol, part of the state-funded "Utpal Dutt Natyotsav" (Utpal Dutt Theatre Festival), on an off-shore stage, by the Hooghly River in Kolkata.

The Last Lear, the 2007 English film based on his play Aajker Shahjahan, on an eccentric Shakespearean actor, and directed for the screen by Rituparno Ghosh, later won the National Film Award for Best Feature Film in English.

== Personal life ==
In 1960, Dutt married theatre and film actress Shobha Sen. Their only daughter, Bishnupriya Dutt, is a professor of Theatre & Performance studies at the School of Arts & Aesthetics at Jawaharlal Nehru University, New Delhi.

== Death ==
On 19 August 1993, Dutt died due to a heart attack right after he returned home from the S.S.K.M hospital, Calcutta, West Bengal where he had undergone dialysis.

== Awards and recognition ==
- 1990 Sangeet Natak Akademi Fellowship for lifetime contribution to theatre
- National Film Award for Best Actor – Won
  1970 Bhuvan Shome – Bhuvan Shome
- Filmfare Best Comedian Award – Won
  1980 Gol Maal – Bhawani Shankar
  1982 Naram Garam – Bhavani Shankar
  1984 Rang Birangi – Police Inspector Dhurandhar Bhatawdekar
- Bengal Film Journalists' Association Award: Best Actor Award – Won
  1993 Agantuk – Manomohan Mitra
- Filmfare Best Supporting Actor Award – Nominated
  1975 Amanush – Mahim Ghoshal
  1980 Gol Maal – Bhawani Shankar
  1986 Saaheb – Badri Prasad Sharma

== Filmography ==
This is an incomplete filmography of Utpal Dutt.

- Michael Madhusudhan (1950)
- Vidyasagar (1950)
- Vikram Urvashi (1954)
- Rani Rasmani (1955)
- Bir Hambir (1955)
- Taka Ana Pay (1956)
- Subhalagna (1956)
- Harano Sur (1957)
- Saptapadi (1961) (voice)
- Rakta Palash (1962)
- Shesh Anka (1963)
- Surya Sikha (1963)
- Momer Alo (1964)
- Shakespeare-Wallah (1965)
- Chowringhee (1968)
- The Guru (1969)
- Bhuvan Shome (1969)
- Saat Hindustani (1969)
- Bombay Talkie (1970)
- Kalankita Nayak (1970)
- Calcutta 71 (1971)
- Guddi (1971)
- Khunjey Berai (1971)
- Ek Adhuri Kahani (1972)
- Mere Jeevan Saathi (1972)
- Sabse Bada Sukh (1972)
- Honeymoon (1973)
- Marjina Abdulla (1973)
- Shriman Prithviraj (1973)
- Asati (1974)
- Chorus (1974)
- Mr. Romeo (1974)
- Jukti, Takko Aar Gappo (1974)
- Thagini (1974)
- Amanush (1975)
- Julie (1975)
- Anari (1975)
- Palanka (1975)
- Jana Aranya (1976)
- Datta (1976)
- Do Anjaane (1976)
- Suntan (1976)
- Sei Chokh (1976)
- Shaque (1976)
- Kotwal Saab (1977)
- Yehi Hai Zindagi (1977)
- Immaan Dharam (1977) as Balbir Singh, Military Man
- Anand Ashram (1977)
- Anurodh (1977)
- Dulhan Wahi Jo Piya Man Bhaaye (1977)
- Ek Hi Raasta
- Farishta Ya Qatil (1977)
- Kissa Kursi Ka (1977)
- Priyatama (1977)
- Swami (1977)
- Atithee (1978)
- Striker (1978)
- Safed Haathi (1978)
- Bandie (1978)
- Dhanraj Tamang (1978)
- Joi Baba Felunath (1978)
- Toote Khilone (1978)
- Kartavya (1979) as Dewan Dhanpati Rai
- Gol Maal (1979)
- The Great Gambler (1979)
- Jharh (1979)
- Prem Vivah (1979)
- Agreement (1980)
- Hirak Rajar Deshe (1980)
- Paka Dekha (1980)
- Apne Paraye (1980)
- Ram Balram (1980)
- Agni Pareeksha (1981)
- Naram Garam (1981)
- Barsaat Ki Ek Raat (1981) aka Anusandhan (India: Bengali title)
- Chaalchitra (1981)
- Meghmukti (1981)
- Subarna Golak (1981)
- Baisakhi Megh (1981) as Colonel Manningham
- Shoukheeen (1981)
- Rajbadhu (1982)
- Raaste Pyar Ke (1982)
- Hamari Bahu Alka (1982)
- Angoor (1982)
- Achha Bura (1983)
- Rang Birangi (1983)
- Duti Pata (1983)
- Kissi Se Na Kehna (1983)
- Pasand Apni Apni (1983)
- Shubh Kaamna (1983)
- Love Marriage (1984)
- John Jani Janardhan (1984)
- Lakhon Ki Baat (1984)
- Inquilaab (1984)
- Paar (1984)
- Yeh Desh (1984)
- Saaheb (1985)
- Harishchandra Shaibya (1985)
- Aar Paar (1985)
- Anyay Abichar (1985)
- Ulta Seedha (1985)
- Aap Ke Saath (1986)
- Baat Ban Jaye (1986)
- Kirayadar (1986)
- Main Balwan (1986)
- Pathbhola (1986)
- Sadaa Suhagan (1986)
- Kissa Kathmandu Ka (1986–1987, TV series)
- Pyar Ke Kabil (1987)
- Aaj Ka Robin Hood (1987)
- Asha O Bhalobasha (1988)
- Mahaveera (1988)
- La Nuit Bengali (1988)
- Aakrosh (1989)
- Bahurani (1989)
- Jawani Zindabad (1990)
- Mera Pati Sirf Mera Hai (1990)
- Agantuk (1991)
- Jaan Pechaan (1991)
- Path-o-Prasad (1991)
- Padma Nadir Majhi (1992) Indo-Bangladesh joint production
- Byomkesh Bakshi (1993)
- Misti Madhur (1993)
- Ajana Path (1994)

== Plays ==
- Mirkassim -
- Tiner Talowar -1971
- Ferari Fauj -1969
- Boniker Rajdando -
- Barricade -
- Chayanat -1958
- Kangor Karagare -
- Kallol -1968
- Ongaar -1958
- Aajker Shahjahan -
- Lohaar Bheem -
- Mahusher Adhikarey -
- Ebar Rajar Pala -
- Danrao Pathikbar -
- "Tir" -1967
- "Leniner Dak" - 1969
- "Ghum Nei" -1961
- "Ajeya Vietnam" -1966

== Works ==
- Girish Chandra Ghosh. Sahitya Akademi Publications. 1992. ISBN 81-7201-197-0. Excerpts
- The Great Rebellion, 1857 (Mahabidroha), Seagull Books, 1986. ISBN 81-7046-032-8.
- On Theatre, Seagull Books. 2009. ISBN 81-7046-251-7.
- Towards A Revolutionary Theatre. Seagull Books, 2009. ISBN 81-7046-340-8.
- On Cinema. Seagull Books, 2009. ISBN 81-7046-252-5.
- Acted in Byomkesh Bakshi Episode 3: Seemant Heera
- Rights Of Man (Manusher Adhikare). Seagull Books, 2009. ISBN 81-7046-331-9.
- 3 Plays. Seagull Books, 2009. ISBN 81-7046-256-8.
- Gadya Sangraha, Volume1, 1998 ISBN 81-7612-033-2 & Volume 2,2011ISBN 978-81-295-1125-6, Dey's Publishing
- Encore (Theater Stories selected and translated by Utpal Dutta), Deep Prakashan
- Sahhensha Tomar Puraskar Tomar-i Thak (A Collection of Poems by Utpal Dutta), Deep Prakshan
