= Priyatama =

- Movie Poster
- Directed by: Basu Chatterjee
- Written by: Ranjan Bose; Anjaan; Yogesh(lyrics)
- Produced by: T.C.Dewan
- Starring: Jeetendra; Neetu Singh; Rakesh Roshan; Asha Sachdev; Utpal Dutt
- Cinematography: K. K. Mahajan
- Music by: Rajesh Roshan
- Production company: Modern Pictures
- Release date: 20 September 1977
- Running time: 135 minutes
- Country: India
- Language: Hindi

Priyatama (transl. Sweetheart) is a 1977 Hindi-language musical film, produced by T.C. Dewan under the Modern Pictures banner and directed by Basu Chatterjee. It stars actors like Jeetendra, Neetu Singh, Rakesh Roshan, Asha Sachdev in lead roles, with music composed by Rajesh Roshan. Asha Sachdev won the Filmfare Award for Best Supporting Actress for the portrayal of the character of Renu. According to film expert Rajesh Subramanian, producer T C Dewan in a foul mood rejected the song Koi roko na, calling it rubbish. He spoke harshly to lyricist Yogesh Gaur which hurt the writer deeply. Although Dewan later apologised Yogesh walked out of the film never fo work again with him. Song writer Anjaan stepped in to pen the remaining songs. Ironically Koi roko na sung by Kishore Kumar became a chartbuster.

== Cast ==
- Jeetendra as Ravi
- Neetu Singh as Dolly
- Rakesh Roshan as Vicky
- Utpal Dutt as Dolly's father Mr. Sinha
- Asha Sachdev as Dolly's friend Renu
- I. S. Johar as Lawyer Kaantawala, a feminist and advocate of Dolly
- G. Asrani as Lawyer Rustomji, advocate of Ravi
- Deven Verma as David Pinto
- Sapru as Doctor
- Asit Sen as Natwarlal

== Soundtrack ==
#	Title	Singer(s)
1	"Koi Roko Na"	Kishore Kumar
2	"Tu Jo Bole Haan To Haan"	Kishore Kumar, Usha Mangeshkar
3	"Tere Bin Kaise Din"	Lata Mangeshkar
4	"Na Na Jaane Na Doongi"	Mohammed Rafi, Usha Mangeshkar
5	"Cham Cham Barse"	Asha Bhosle
