= Us Paar =

- Directed by: Basu Chatterjee
- Screenplay by: Basu Chatterjee
- Produced by: Basu Chatterjee
- Starring: Vinod Mehra; Moushumi Chatterjee
- Music by: Sachin Dev Burman
- Production company: Cineye Films
- Release date: 29 April 1974
- Running time: 124 minutes
- Country: India
- Language: Hindi

Us Paar is a 1974 Hindi film directed by Basu Chatterjee and starring Vinod Mehra and Moushumi Chatterjee. It has music by Sachin Dev Burman and lyrics by Yogesh.

== Synopsis ==
Us-Paar is a story about a young guy who comes to his village after completing his studies and falls in love with a girl. Later he learns that the girl who he loves is already engaged to someone else. The story takes a turn when they plans to escape from the girl's fiancé but the guy does not turn up.

== Cast ==
- Vinod Mehra as Mohan
- Moushumi Chatterjee as Kamli
- Padma Khanna as Dhaniya
- Jalal Agha as Bhairon
- Raja Paranjape as Mohan's grandfather

== Soundtrack ==
Us Paar

Soundtrack album by S. D. Burman
- Released: April 29, 1974
- Genre: Feature film soundtrack
- Length: 22:58
- Language: Hindi
- Label: Saregama
- Producer: S. D. Burman

S. D. Burman chronology
Phagun (1973)	Us Paar (1974)	Prem Nagar (1974)

All lyrics are written by Yogesh; all music is composed by S. D. Burman.

Songs
No.	Title	Playback	Length
1.	"Pyara Hindola Mera"	Asha Bhosle	5:57
2.	"Mitwa Piya Maine Kya Kiya"	Manna Dey	4:46
3.	"Ae Mere Man Main Hoon Magan"	Mohammed Rafi	3:55
4.	"Tumne Piya Diya Sab Kuchh"	Lata Mangeshkar	3:52
5.	"Yeh Jab Se Huyi Jiya Ki Chori"	Lata Mangeshkar	4:17
Total length:			22:58
