= Basu Chatterjee =

Indian film director (1927–2020)

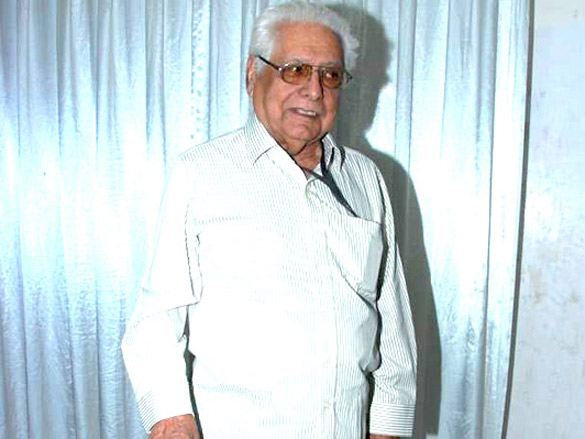
- Chatterjee in October 2012
- Born: 10 January 1927; Ajmer, Ajmer-Merwara, British India
- Died: 4 June 2020 (aged 93); Mumbai, Maharashtra, India
- Occupation: Film director
- Children: 2 daughters

Basu Chatterjee (10 January 1927 – 4 June 2020) was an Indian film director and screenwriter in Hindi Cinema and Bengali . Through the 1970s and 1980s, he became associated with what came to be known as middle cinema or middle-of-the-road cinema filmmakers, such as Hrishikesh Mukherjee and Basu Bhattacharya, whom he assisted on Teesri Kasam (1966). Like their films, his films dealt with light-hearted stories of middle-class families often in urban settings, focusing on marital and love relationships. The exceptions being films such as Ek Ruka Hua Faisla (1986) and Kamla Ki Maut (1989), which delved into social and moral issues.

He is best known for his films Us Paar, Chhoti Si Baat (1975), Chitchor (1976), Rajnigandha (1974), Piya Ka Ghar (1972), Dillagi (1978), Khatta Meetha, Swami (1977), Baton Baton Mein (1979), Priyatama (1977), Man Pasand, Hamari Bahu Alka, Shaukeen (1982), and Chameli Ki Shaadi (1986).

Chatterjee directed the Bengali film Hothath Brishti (1998), which featured actors from both Bangladesh and India. The film featured Ferdous Ahmed from Bangladesh, and Priyanka Trivedi and Sreelekha Mitra from West Bengal. Chatterjee continued to cast Ahmed in subsequent Indian-Bengali films, including Chupi Chupi (2001), Tak Jhal Mishti (2002) and Hotath Shedin (2012), another joint production of Bangladesh and India. He wrote the script for the Bangladeshi film Ek Cup Cha, directed by Noyeem Imtiaz Neamul.

== Early life ==
Basu Chatterjee was born in Ajmer, Rajasthan, India, in a Bengali family. His middle class upbringing reflected in his movies that explored areas which were far removed from the glitz and glamour of the blockbusters of the time.

== Career ==
In 1950s, Chatterjee arrived in Bombay (now Mumbai) and started his career as an illustrator and cartoonist for the weekly tabloid Blitz published by Russi Karanjia. He worked there for 18 years before changing career paths to filmmaking, when he assisted Basu Bhattacharya in the Raj Kapoor and Waheeda Rehman starrer Teesri Kasam (1966), which later won the National Film Award for Best Feature Film. Eventually, he made his directorial debut with Sara Akash in 1969, which won him the Filmfare Best Screenplay Award.

Some of his most critically acclaimed films are Sara Akash (1969), Piya Ka Ghar (1971), Us Paar (1974), Rajnigandha (1974), Chhoti Si Baat (1975), Chitchor (1976), Swami (1977), Khatta Meetha, Priyatama, Chakravyuha (1978 film), Jeena Yahan (1979), Baton Baton Mein (1979), Apne Paraye (1980), Shaukeen and Ek Ruka Hua Faisla.

Other films include Ratnadeep, Safed Jhooth, Man Pasand, Hamari Bahu Alka, Kamla Ki Maut and Triyacharitra.

He has also directed many Bengali films such as Hothat Brishti, Hochcheta Ki and Hothat Shei Din.

Chatterjee directed the television series Byomkesh Bakshi and Rajani for Doordarshan. He was a member of the jury at the 10th Moscow International Film Festival in 1977 and a member of the International Film And Television Club of the Asian Academy of Film & Television. A retrospective of Chatterjee's work was held as part of the Kala Ghoda Art Festival Mumbai in February 2011.

A book on the work of Basu Chatterjee, Basu Chatterji: And Middle of the road cinema, by music historian Anirudha Bhattacharjee, was published by Penguin Random House in 2023.

== Awards ==
- 2007: IIFA Lifetime Achievement Award
- 1992: National Film Award for Best Film on Family Welfare - Durga
- 1991: Filmfare Best Screenplay Award – Kamla Ki Maut
- 1980: Filmfare Critics Award for Best Movie – Jeena Yahan
- 1978: National Film Award for Best Popular Film Providing Wholesome Entertainment - Swami
- 1978: Filmfare Best Director Award – Swami
- 1977: Filmfare Best Screenplay Award - Chitchor Nominee
- 1976: Filmfare Best Screenplay Award – Chhoti Si Baat
- 1975: Filmfare Critics Award for Best Movie – Rajnigandha
- 1972: Filmfare Best Screenplay Award – Sara Akash

== Filmography ==
Year	Title	Credited as		Producer	Notes
Year	Title	Director	Writer	Producer	Notes
1969	Sara Akash	Yes	Yes		
1971	Piya Ka Ghar	Yes			
1974	Rajnigandha	Yes	Yes		
1974	Us Paar	Yes	Yes	Yes	
1975	Chhoti Si Baat	Yes			
1976	Chitchor	Yes			
1977	Safed Jhooth	Yes	Yes		
1977	Swami	Yes			
1977	Priyatama	Yes			
1978	Khatta Meetha	Yes	Yes		
1978	Dillagi	Yes	Yes		
1978	Tumhare Liye	Yes	Yes		
1979	Do Ladke Dono Kadke	Yes			
1979	Manzil	Yes			
1979	Chakravyuha	Yes			
1979	Prem Vivah	Yes			
1979	Ratnadeep	Yes			
1979	Baton Baton Mein	Yes		Yes	
1980	Man Pasand	Yes			
1980	Apne Paraye	Yes			
1981	Jeena Yahan	Yes			
1982	Hamari Bahu Alka	Yes	Yes		
1982	Shoukheeen	Yes	Yes		
1983	Pasand Apni Apni	Yes		Yes	
1984	Lakhon Ki Baat	Yes	Yes	Yes	
1986	Ek Ruka Hua Faisla	Yes		Yes	
1986	Kirayadar	Yes			
1986	Chameli Ki Shaadi	Yes	Yes		
1986	Sheesha	Yes			Bengali-language film
1989	Kamla Ki Maut	Yes	Yes		
1990	Hamari Shadi	Yes	Yes		
1997	Triyacharittar	Yes			
1997	Gudgudee	Yes			
1998	Hothat Brishti	Yes			Bengali-language films
2001	Chupi Chupi	Yes			Bengali-language films
2002	Tak Jhal Mishti	Yes			Bengali-language films
2007	Prateeksha	Yes			
2007	Kuch Khatta Kuch Meetha	Yes			
2008	Hochheta Ki	Yes			Bengali-language films
2011	Kalidas o Chemistry	Yes			Bengali-language films
2011	Trishanku	Yes			Bengali-language films

=== Dialogue writer ===
Dialogue writer
Year	Film	Producer	Notes
1972	Piya Ka Ghar	Tarachand Barjatya	
1974	Rajnigandha	Suresh Jindal, Kamal Saigal	
1978	Khatta Meetha	Gul Anand, Romu Sippy	
1978	Dillagi	Bikram Singh Dehal, Kanwar Ajit Singh	
1982	Hamari Bahu Alka	Shyamsunder Seksaria	
1984	Lakhon Ki Baat	Basu Chatterjee	

=== Screenplay ===
Screenplay
Year	Film	Producer	Notes
1969	Sara Akash	Basu Chatterjee	
1974	Rajnigandha	Suresh Jindal, Kamal Saigal	
1974	Us Paar	Self	
1977	Safed Jhooth	Ashim Kumar	
1978	Khatta Meetha	Gul Anand, Romu Sippy	
1978	Dillagi	Bikram Singh Dehal, Kanwar Ajit Singh	
1982	Hamari Bahu Alka	Shyamsunder Seksaria	
1984	Lakhon Ki Baat	Basu Chatterjee	

=== Producer ===
Producer
Year	Film	Director	Notes
1979	Baton Baton Mein	Self	
1983	Pasand Apni Apni	Self	
1984	Lakhon Ki Baat	Basu Chatterjee	
1986	Ek Ruka Hua Faisla	Self	TV film

=== Director (TV series) ===
Director TV series or film
Year	Show	Channel	Notes
1985	Rajani	DD National	
1985	Darpan	DD National	
1986	Ek Ruka Hua Faisla	DD National	(TV film)
1988	Kakaji Kahin	DD National	
1988	Jodi Emon Hoto	DD Bangla	
1990-91	Bheem Bhavani	DD National	
1993 & 1997	Byomkesh Bakshi	DD National	2 seasons 32 episodes
2005	Ek Prem Katha	DD National	26 episodes

=== Assistant director ===
Assistant director
Year	Film	Producer	Notes
1966	Teesri Kasam	Shailendra	Directed by Basu Bhattacharya
1968	Saraswatichandra	Vivek	Directed by Govind Saraiya

== Death ==
Chatterjee died due to an age-related illness at his house in Mumbai on 4 June 2020. He was 93 years old.
