= Shreeram Lagoo filmography =

Filmography page of Shreeram Lagoo

Shreeram Lagoo was an Indian film and theatre actor, in Hindi and Marathi. He was known for his character roles in films. He acted in over 250 films including Hindi and Marathi films as well as Hindi, Marathi, and Gujarati plays, and directed over 20 Marathi plays. He won the 1978 Filmfare Award for Best Supporting Actor for the Hindi film Gharaonda.

== Marathi films ==
Year	Films	Role	Notes
1972	Pinjara	Shridhar Pant	Debut
1974	Yashoda	Anna	
1974	Sugandhi Katta	Mhamdu Dholkiwala	
1975	Samna	Master	
1976	Lavani Zali Ga Ragini	Guruji	
1977	Paradh	Seth Dinanath	
1977	Devki Nandan Gopala	Gadge Maharaj	
1977	Bhingri	Sada Sarbatwala	
1978	Chandra Hota Sakshila	Shridhar	
1979	Sinhasan	Vishwasrao Dabhade	
1979	Sobti	Pujari Kaka	
1979	Janki	Shreeram Sawant/ Rajaram	
1979	Aapli Manse	Kaka	
1980	Fatakadi	Darji Narayan	
1980	Zaakol	Husband	
1980	Zidd	Bapu Bhaiya	
1980	Savli Premachi	Master	
1980	Saubhagyadan	Doctor	
1980	Hich Khari Daulat	Shreeram	
1981	Mosambi Narangi	Raghuji	
1981	Khara Khota	Raj Bahadur	
1983	Gupchup Gupchup	Sir Saheb	
1984	Gulchadi	Aaba Patil	
1984	Chawhata	Rao	
1985	Mulgi Zali Ho	Mahadevrao Sasane	
1985	Khichdi	Dadsaheb Jagdale	
1987	Chakke Panje	Aabasaheb Deshmukh	
1988	Reshimgathi	Vishnu	
1989	Ek Ratra Mantarleli	Solicitor Pradhan	
1990	Kuldeepak	Raosaheb Inamdar	
1990	Dhadaka	Barrister Paranjape	
1991	Suryodaya	Agnihotri	
1991	Pratikar	Master	
1991	Phoolwanti	Pandit Shastri	
1992	Zunj Tuzi Mazi	Mr. Nagvekar	
1992	Haach Sunbaicha Bhau	Himself	Cameo appearance
1993	Shivrayanchi Soon Tararani	Aurangzeb	
1993	Porka	Baba	
1994	Maza Saubhagya	Doctor	
1994	Mayechi Sawli	Raosaheb Velankar	
1995	Mukta	Aabasaheb Kansepatil	
2001	Dhyaas Parva		
2004	Pandhar		
2011	One Room Kitchen	Himself	Cameo appearance
2012	Masala	Perfume Seller	Cameo appearance
2014	Nagrik	Nana Chitnis	
2016	Shasan	Vishwasrao Tidke	

== Hindi films ==
Year	Film	Role	Notes
1975	Ponga Pandit	Professor	Hindi debut
1976	Raeeszada	Shiv Narayan Saxena	
1976	Hera Pheri	Police Commissioner Khanna	
1976	Chalte Chalte	Dr. Roy	
1976	Aaj Ka Ye Ghar	Sajjan	
1976	Bullet	Seth Ghanshyamdas	
1976	Barood	Inspector Durgaprasad Saxena	
1977	Duniyadari	Panditji	
1977	Immaan Dharam	Govind Anna	
1977	Kinara	Architect Uncle	
1977	Gharaonda	Modi	Filmfare Award for Best Supporting Actor
1977	Inkaar	Haridas Chaudhary	
1977	Shankar Hussain	Uday Shankar	
1977	Mandir Masjid	Shreeram	
1977	Kitaab	Baijuram	
1977	Agar... If	Ashok Saxena	
1978	Mera Rakshak	Avinash Rai	
1978	Naya Daur	Pascal	
1978	Arvind Desai Ki Ajeeb Dastaan	Dharmsi Desai	
1978	Damaad	Shreedhar Mazgaonkar	
1978	Des Pardes	Mr. Bond	
1978	Phool Khile Hai Gulshan Gulshan	Laxmi Narayan	
1978	College Girl	Munim Vednath	
1978	Muqaddar Ka Sikandar	Ramnath	
1978	Devata	Father Fernandez	
1978	Shalimar	Tolaram	
1978	Sajan Bina Suhagana	Gopal Chopra	
1978	Anjaam	Dinanath	
1979	Sargam	Chintamani Pradhan	
1979	Muqabla	Sabbarbaba	
1979	Magroor	Chacha	
1979	Jurmana	Prof. Dayashankar Sharma	
1979	Meera	Virendev Rathod	
1979	Manzil	Mr. Kapoor	
1979	Taraana	Rana	
1979	Hum Tere Aashiq Hain	Dr. Pradhan	
1979	Ladke Baap Se Badke	Mr. Verma	
1979	Dooriyaan	Prabhakar	
1980	Do Aur Do Paanch	Rai Bahadur Mathur	
1980	Kashish	Principal	
1980	Lootmaar	Seth Ramniklal	
1980	Swayamvar	Ratanlal	
1980	Thodisi Bewafaii	Surendra Deshmukh	
1980	Jyoti Bane Jwala	O.P. Bakshi	
1980	Neeyat	Arvind	
1980	Gehrayee	Channappa Bassappa	
1980	Insaf Ka Tarazu	Mr. Chandra	
1980	Jwalamukhi	Anand	
1980	Nishana	Thakur Pratap Singh	
1980	Kasturi	Prof. Prashant	
1980	Bin Maa Ke Bachche	Motiram	

- Sugandhi Katta (1974)
- Mere Saath Chal (1974) as Ravi
- Ponga Pandit (1975) as Professor
- Raeeszada (1976) as Shiv Narayan Saxena
- Hera Pheri (1976) as Police Commissioner Khanna
- Bullet (1976) as Seth. Ghanshyamdas
- Chalte Chalte (1976) as Roy
- Barood (1976) as Inspector Durgaprasad Saxena
- Aaj Ka Ye Ghar (1976) as Sajjan
- Rangila Ratan (1976) as Dr. Anand
- Immaan Dharam (1977) as Govind Anna
- Shankar Hussain (1977)
- Mandir Masjid (1977)
- Kitaab (1977) as Baijuram
- Kinara (1977)
- Inkaar (1977) as Haridas Choudhury
- Gharaonda (1977) as Modi
- Duniyadari (1977) as Panditji
- Agar... If (1977) as Ashok Saxena
- Mera Rakshak (1978) as Avinash Rai
- Naya Daur (1978) as Jenny's dad
- Arvind Desai Ki Ajeeb Dastaan (1978) as Dharmsi Desai
- Damaad (1978) as Shreedhar Mazgaonkar
- Des Pardes (1978) as Mr. Bond
- Phool Khile Hain Gulshan Gulshan (1978)
- College Girl (1978)
- Muqaddar Ka Sikandar (1978) as Ramanath
- Devata (1978) as Father Fernandez
- Saajan Bina Suhagan (1978) as Gopal Chopra
- Shalimar (1978) as Tolaram
- Arvind Desai Ki Ajeeb Dastaan (1978) as Dharmsi Desai
- Anjaam (1978) as Dinanath
- Sargam (1979) as Masterji Chintamani Pradhan
- Muqabla (1979) as Sabbarbaba
- Magroor (1979) as Chacha
- Jurmana (1979) as Prof. Dayashankar Sharma
- Meera (1979) as Raja Biramdev Rathod
- Manzil (1979) as Mr. Kapoor
- Tarana (1979) (Mithun Chakraborty, Ranjeeta Kaur, Bhagwan) as Rana
- Hum Tere Ashiq Hain (1979) as Pradhan
- Ladke Baap Se Badke (1979) as Verma
- Dooriyaan (1979) as Prabhakar
- Aapli Manse (1979)
- Fatakadi (1980)
- Do Aur Do Paanch (1980) as Rai Bahadur Mathur
- Kashish (1980)
- Lootmaar (1980) as Seth Ramniklal
- Thodisi Bewafaii (1980) as Surendra Deshmukh
- Jyoti Bane Jwala (1980) as O.P. Bakshi
- Neeyat (1980) as Arvind – Vijay's brother
- Gehrayee (1980) as Chennabassapa
- Insaaf Ka Tarazu (1980) as Mr. Chandra (Lawyer)
- Jwalamukhi as Anand
- Swayamvar (1980) as Ratanlal
- Nishana (1980) as Poonam's father
- Kasturi (1980) as Prof. Prashant
- Bin Maa Ke Bachche (1980) as Motiram – Ashok's & Gauri's father
- Yeh Kaisa Nashaa Hai (1981)
- Sweety (1981)
- Ehsaan Aap Ka (1981) as Meeta's Uncle
- Aakhri Mujra (1981) as Anand Narayan
- Chehre Pe Chehra (1981) as Priest
- Agni Pareeksha (1981) as Advocate Anupam
- Laawaris (1981) as Gangu Ganpat
- Ghungroo Ki Awaaz (1981) as Jasbir Singh 'Mamaji'
- Shama (1981) as Governor
- Zamaane Ko Dikhana Hai (1981) as Mr. S.K. Nanda
- Sansani: The Sensation (1981) as Kumar Rajdev
- Raaz (1981) as Handicapped Man
- Professor Pyarelal (1981) as Kishanchand / King
- Plot No. 5 (1981) as Verma
- Mosambi Narangi (1981)
- Khara Khota (1981)
- Hum Paagal Premee (1982)
- Do Dishayen (1982)
- Raaste Pyar Ke (1982) as Dwarka Prasad (uncredited)
- Chorni (1982) as Judge Sinha
- Shriman Shrimati (1982) as Surajmal
- Ghazab (1982) as Vikram Singh
- Deedar-E-Yaar (1982) as Nawab Mirza Firad Ali Changezi
- Samraat (1982) as Gomes
- Gandhi (1982) as Professor Gopal Krishna Gokhale
- Vidhaata (1982) as Sir Mizia
- Kaamchor (1982) as Rai Bahadur Chunilal Sanghvi
- Main Intequam Loonga (1982) as Madan Agnihotri
- Dil Hi Dil Mein (1982) as Major Mahendra Pratap Singh
- Daulat (1982) as Ghanshyam / Vikram Singh
- Baawri (1982) as RajaRam Sharma
- Gumnaam Hai Koi (1983)
- Zara Si Zindagi (1983) as Mr. Shastri – Rakesh's father
- Chatpati (1983)
- Souten (1983) as Gopal
- Sadma (1983) as Khandeparkar (uncredited)
- Mujhe Insaaf Chahiye (1983) as Viswanath Agarwal – Malati's father
- Mawaali (1983) as Goyal Verma
- Pukar (1983) as Purandare
- Kalaakaar (1983) as Rohit Khanna
- Hum Se Hai Zamana (1983) as Kalicharan
- Gupchup Gupchup (1983) as Sir Saheb
- Faraib (1983) as Bansi / Upadhyay
- Bad Aur Badnam (1984) as R. C. Dutta
- Meri Adalat (1984)
- Maqsad (1984) as Vishnupratap
- Love Marriage (1984) as Mehra
- Tarang (1984) as Sethji
- Kahan Tak Aasmaan Hai (1984)
- Hanste Khelte (1984) as Principal Dwarkadas
- Chakma (1984)
- Sarfarosh (1985) as Police Commissioner
- Holi (1985) as Chairman of collegembmmb
- Sitamgar (1985) as Mr. Nath
- Ghar Dwaar (1985) as Dhanraj
- Hum Naujawan (1985) as Home Minister Desai
- Khichdi (1985)
- Bond 303 (1985) as Prem's father – master evilmind
- Ankahee (1985) as Jyotishbhaskar Pandit Satyanarayan Chaturvedi
- Dilwaala (1986) as Ganesh Vithal Kolhapure
- Singhasan (1986) as Mahamantri Shrikant
- Raat Ke Baad (1986)
- Saveraywali Gaadi (1986) as Chhediram
- Locket (1986) as Diwan Sardarilal
- Maanav Hatya (1986)
- Kala Dhanda Goray Log (1986) as Haji Irshad Patel
- Muddat (1986) as Vikram Singh
- Nasihat (1986)
- Ek Aur Sikander (1986) as Inspector Verma
- Samay Ki Dhaara (1986) as Ajay's Employee
- Jeeva (1986) as Thakur
- Ghar Sansar (1986) as Satyanarayan
- Ek Pal (1986) as Priyam's father
- Ek main aur ek Tu (1986)
- Chhota Aadmi (1986)
- Mahananda (1987)
- Besahara (1987) as Dindayal
- Majaal (1987) as Pujari Vishnu Prasad
- Awam (1987) as Minister / Lawyer
- Insaf Ki Pukar (1987) as Jagannath
- Sher Shivaji (1987)
- Purnasatya (1987) as Baba
- Mera Karam Mera Dharam (1987) as Sarjuprasad
- Mard Ki Zabaan (1987) as Zamindar Raghupathi Sahay
- Kaamaagni (1987)
- Chhakke Panje (1987)
- Dukh-Dard (1988)
- Aurat Teri Yehi Kahani (1988) as Dharamraj
- Tamacha (1988) as Chandra Pratap Singh
- Charnon Ki Saugandh (1988) as Govind
- Waqt Ki Awaz (1988) as Ishwar Prasad
- Namumkin (1988) as Ashok Saxena
- Muhabbat Ki Hai Humne (1989)
- Apne Begaane (1989)
- Touhean (1989) as Deepika's Father
- Daana Paani (1989) as D. R. Singh
- Ek Din Achanak (1989) as Professor (Neeta's father)
- Nache Nagin Gali Gali (1989) as Seth Girdharilal
- Gharana (1989) as Prem Mehra
- Galiyon Ka Badshah (1989) as Abdul
- Ek Ratra Manterleli (1989) as Solicitor Pradhan
- Kuldeepak (1990)
- Kishen Kanhaiya (1990) as Sunder Das
- Suryodaya (1991)
- Dushman Devta (1991) as Master Dina Nath
- Sau Crore (1991) as Judge
- Phoolwati (1991)
- Lakhpati (1991)
- Baat Hai Pyaar Ki (1991) as Anjali's father
- Rajoo Dada (1992)
- Naya Sawan (1992)
- Current
- Sarphira (1992) as Judge B. K. Sinha
- Geet Milan Ke Gaate Rehenge (1992)
- Immaculate Conception (1992) as Dadaji / Samira's grandfather
- Zunz Tujhi Majhi (1992) as Nagvekar
- Naseebwaala (1992) as Sharda's Father
- Kisme Kitna Hai Dum (1992)
- Hach Sunbaicha Bahu (1992)
- Maya (1993)
- Badi Bahen (1993) as Dwarkaprasad
- Pyaar Ka Tarana (1993)
- Shivrayachi Soon Tararani (1993) as Badshah Aurangzeb
- Khuddar (1994) as Shastri Suri
- Gopalaa (1994) as Chief Minister
- Sajan Ka Dard (1995)
- Hahakaar (1996) as Commissioner of Police
- Aurat Aurat Aurat (1996) as Barrister Vajpai
- Aatank (1996) as Catholic Priest
- Dhyasparva (2001)
- Pandhar (2004)
- Aahat – Ek Ajib Kahani (2010)
- One Room Kitchen (2011) as Special appearance
- Nagrik (2014) as Nana Chitnis
- The Great Freedom Fighter Lokmanya Bal Gangadhar Tilak - Swaraj My Birthright (2018) as Dadabhai Navroji (final film role)

== Bhojpuri films ==
- Hamar Bhauji (1983)

== Marathi plays ==
- Vedyache Ghar Unhat
- Jagannathacha Rath
- Gidhade
- Kachecha Chandra
- Himalayachi Sawali
- Natsamrat
- Surya Pahilela Manus
- Aadhe Adhure
- Garbo
- Atmakatha
- Kanyadaan
- Pappa Saanga Kunache!
- Premachi Goshta
- Khoon Pahava Karoon
- Dubhang
- Sundaar Mi Honaar
- Kirwant
- Mitra
- Ithe Oshalala Mrutyu
