= Dinesh Thakur =

Indian theatre director (1947–2012)

- Born: Dinesh Thakur; 8 August 1947; Jaipur, Rajasthan, India.
- Died: 20 September 2012 (aged 64–65)
- Education: Kirori Mal College, New Delhi
- Occupations: Theatre director, Actor
- Years active: 1971–2012
- Known for: Ank Theatre Company
- Children: Mahesh Thakur
- Website: Ank Theatre Group

Dinesh Thakur (8 August 1947 – 20 September 2012) was an Indian theatre director, actor in theatre, television and Hindi film, where most notably he appeared as one of the leads in Rajnigandha 1974 and directed by Basu Chatterjee, which won both Filmfare Best Movie Award and the Filmfare Critics Award for Best Movie. Dinesh Thakur was born in 1947 in Jaipur, Rajasthan, India. He was the founder-director of ANK productions, a Mumbai-based theatre company, established in 1976.

Though he mainly appeared as character roles in Hindi films, as a screenwriter and story writer, he is known for writing the story and screenplay of Ghar (1978), which won him the 1979 Filmfare Best Story Award.

He died on 20 September 2012 due to kidney failure.

== Career ==
Dinesh Thakur did his graduation from Kirori Mal College (KMC), Delhi University, where was also part of the KMC dramatic society.

He made his film debut in 1971, with Mere Apne, written and directed by Gulzar, and followed it up with Basu Bhattacharya's Anubhav (1971) and later in Griha Pravesh (1979). 1974 saw him appearing in Basu Chatterjee's landmark in middle cinema, Rajnigandha (1974), alongside Amol Palekar and Vidya Sinha, which won the Filmfare Best Film Award, and went on appear in several films with both the directors in the coming years.

He established 'Ank Theatre Group' in 1976, dedicated solely to Hindi theatre in Mumbai; though it started flourishing in a big way with the advent on Jennifer Kapoor's Prithvi Theatre in 1978.

== Filmography ==
- Mere Apne (1971)
- Anubhav (1971)
- Jalte Badan (1973)
- Rajnigandha (10 Sep 1974) as Naveen Ad Filmmaker
- Parinay (1974)
- Faslah (1974)
- Kalicharan (1976)
- Karm (1977)
- Madhu Malti (1978)
- Ghar (1978)
- Naiyya (1979)
- Meera (1979) as Jaimal Rathod
- Griha Pravesh (1979)
- Khwab (1980)
- The Burning Train (1980) as Ticket Checker (TC)
- La nouvelle malle des Indes (1981) TV mini-series
- Sitara (1980)
- Agni Pareeksha (1981)
- Baghavat (1982)
- Aamne Samne (1982)
- Manju (1983)
- Kanoon Kya Karenga (1983)
- Aaj Ki Awaz (1984)
- Sanjhi (1985)
- Ulta Seedha (1985)
- Surkhiyaan 1985)
- Palay Khan (1986)
- Raj Dulari (1988)
- Aakhri Baazi (1989) as Durjan
- Panchvati (1990)
- Hum Se Na Takrana (1990)
- Zakhmi Rooh (1993)
- Geetanjali (1993)
- Shanti (1994) TV series
- Aastha(1997)
- Aakhri Sanghursh (1997)
- Fiza (2000)
- Nyaay TV series (2000–2001)
- Kyunki Saas Bhi Kabhi Bahu Thi TV series (2000)
- Dil Pardesi Ho Gaya (2003)
- Nigehbaan: The Third Eye (2005)

== Plays ==
- Hai Mera Dil, adaption of Broadway play by Norman Barasch and Carroll Moore, also made into 1964 American comedy film, Send Me No Flowers with starring Rock Hudson, Doris Day and Tony Randall.
- Jin Lahore Nai Dekhya, Asghar Wajahat
- Tughlaq, Girish Karnad, (translated into Hindustani by B.V. Karanth)
- Baki Itihas and Pagla Ghora, by Badal Sircar
- Suno Janmejaya by Shri Ranga
- Jaat Hi Poochho Sadhu Ki, Vijay Tendulkar
- Khamosh! Adalat Jaari Hai, Vijay Tendulkar
- Kamala, Vijay Tendulkar
- Adhe Adhure, Mohan Rakesh
- Rakt-Beej, Shanker Shesh
- Mahabhoj, Mannu Bhandari
- Atamkatha, Mahesh Elkunchwar
- Gaganbhedi, Vasant Kanetkar
- Hangamakhez, Agha Hashar Kashmiri
- Sheh Ye Maat, B.M. Shah
