= Dhondo Keshav Karve =

Indian social reformer (1858–1962)

Maharshi Dhondo Keshav Karve
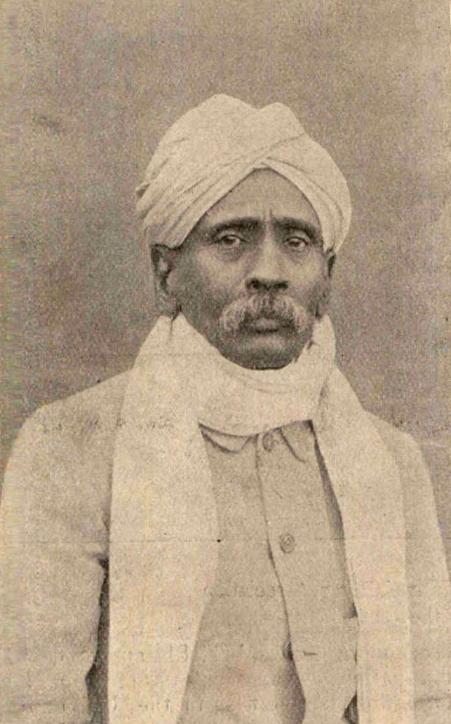
- Born: 18 April 1858; Dapoli, Bombay Presidency, British India
- Died: 9 November 1962 (aged 104); Pune, Maharashtra, India
- Occupations: Professor; activist; writer; social worker
- Spouse(s): Radhabai and Godubai
- Children: 4, including Raghunath Karve, Shankar Karve, Dinkar Karve, Bhaskar Karve
- Awards: Bharat Ratna (1958); Padma Vibhushan (1955)

Dhondo Keshav Karve (18 April 1858 – 9 November 1962), popularly known as Maharshi Karve, was a social reformer in India in the field of women's welfare. He advocated widow remarriage, and he himself remarried a widow as a widower. Karve was a pioneer in promoting widows' education. He founded the first women's university in India, the SNDT Women's University in 1916. He organized a conference against the practice of Devadasi. He started the Anath Balikashram, an orphanage for girls. His intention was to give education to all women and help them stand on their own feet. Through his efforts, the first women university was set up in 20th century. In addition to his work in women's education, he actively campaigned against the caste system and played a key role in founding societies aimed at advancing primary education in rural areas. The Government of India awarded him with the highest civilian award, the Bharat Ratna, in 1958, the year of his 100th birthday.

The appellation Maharshi, which the Indian public often assigned to Karve, means "great sage".

== Biography ==
=== Early life and education ===
Dhondo Keshav Karve was born on 18 April 1858, at Sheravali, in Ratnagiri district of Maharashtra. He belonged to a lower middle-class Chitpavan Brahmin family and his father's name was Keshav Bapunna Karve.

In 1884, he graduated with a degree in mathematics from Elphinstone College.

=== Career ===
During 1891–1914, Karve taught mathematics at Fergusson College in Pune, Maharashtra.

In 1929, he visited Europe, America and Japan. During these travels, he met Albert Einstein. During this world tour, he also raised funds for the university.

== Autobiographical works ==
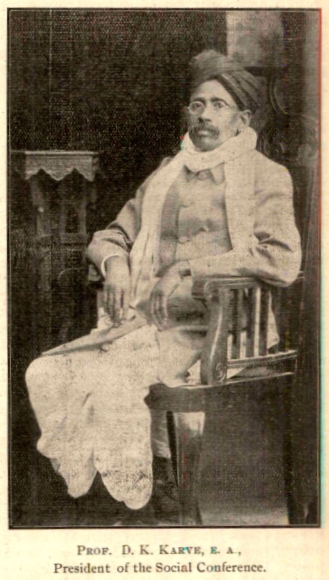
c. 1916

Karve wrote two autobiographical works: Ātmawrutta (1928) in Marathi, and Looking Back (1936) in English.

== Depictions in popular culture ==
The Marathi play Himalayachi Saavli (हिमालयाची सावली) (Note: lit. 'Shadow of the Himalayas'; but contextually 'Under the cover of the Himalayas') by Vasant Kanetkar, published in 1972, is loosely based on the life of Karve. The character of Nanasaheb Bhanu is a composite character based on Karve and other Marathi social reformers of the late 19th and early 20th century. The play itself depicts the tension between Bhanu/Karve's public life as a social reformer and his family life due to the social backlash and economic hardships his children and wife had to endure.

The Story of Dr. Karve is a 1958 documentary film directed by Neil Gokhale and Ram Gabale. It was produced by the Government of India's Films Division.

The 2001 film Dhyaas Parva (ध्यास पर्व) by Amol Palekar, based on the life of Karve's son Raghunath, also depicts the Karve family, and their social reformation projects. Taluka Dapoli, a research based initiative, made a documentary on life of Maharshi Dhondo Keshav Karve in 2017.

== Organizations ==
=== Balika Anathashram ===
In 1896, he established an orphanage for widowed women at Hingne (now Karve Nagar) near Pune. At the same location, he founded a women’s school in 1907. His 20-year-old widowed sister-in-law, Parvatibai Athavale, became the first student of this school.

=== SNDT Women's University ===
In 1916 he established the SNDT Women’s University, with the mission of empowering women through education.

== Awards and honours ==
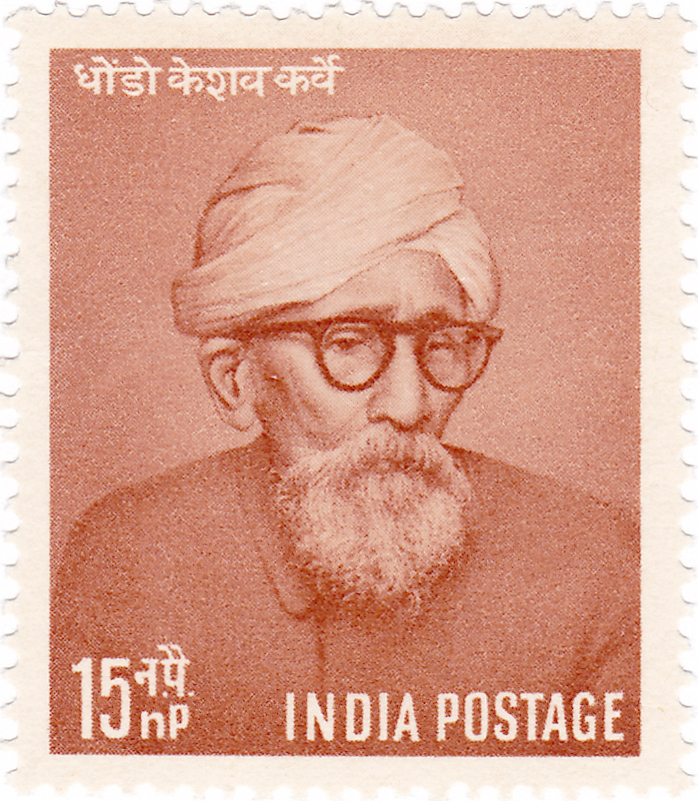
- Dhondo Keshav Karve on a 1958 stamp of India
  1942 – awarded Doctor of Letters (D.Litt.) by Banaras Hindu University
- 1951 – awarded D.Litt. by Pune University
- 1954 – awarded D.Litt. by S.N.D.T. University
- 1955 – awarded Padma Vibhushan by the Government of India
- 1957 – awarded LL.D. by University of Mumbai
- 1958 – awarded Bharat Ratna, the highest civilian award of India, by the Government of India

In his honour, Karvenagar in Pune was named after him & Queen's Road in Mumbai (Bombay) was renamed to Maharshi Karve Road.

== See also ==
- Maharshi Karve Stree Shikshan Samstha
- The new Brahmans; five Maharashtrian families. Essays on D.K. Karve by his son and Irawati Karve
