= Qayamat (1983 film) =

1983 Indian film by Raj N. Sippy

- Directed by: Raj N. Sippy
- Written by: Kader Khan; N. S. Bedi (Dialogues)
- Story by: Mohan Kaul; Ravi Kapoor; Satyanand; Pari Kapoor
- Produced by: Salim Akhtar
- Starring: Dharmendra; Shatrughan Sinha; Smita Patil; Poonam Dhillon; Jaya Prada; Shakti Kapoor; Bindu
- Cinematography: Anwar Siraj; Mohan
- Edited by: Waman Bhonsle; Gurudutt Shirali
- Music by: R. D. Burman; Majrooh Sultanpuri (Lyrics)
- Production company: Aftab Productions
- Release date: 28 October 1983 (India)
- Country: India
- Language: Hindi

Qayamat is a 1983 Indian Hindi action crime film directed by Raj N. Sippy. It is an Indian version of the 1962 Hollywood film Cape Fear. The film stars Dharmendra as a man who goes to jail and holds his police officer friend (Shatrughan Sinha) responsible for the jailing. On his return after a long sentence he sets about taking revenge, targeting the officer and his family (Smita Patil and Poonam Dhillon). Jaya Prada appears in flashbacks as Dharmendra's wife. The film was remade in Telugu as Nippulanti Manishi with Nandamuri Balakrishna. The famous song from the film Guide, Aaj Phir Jine ki Tamanna Hai was reused in this film.

== Cast ==
- Dharmendra as Shyam / Rajeshwar
- Shatrughan Sinha as S.P. Kamal
- Smita Patil as Shashi
- Poonam Dhillon as Sudha
- Jaya Prada as Geeta
- Shakti Kapoor as Kaalia
- Bindu as Munnibai Heera Chand
- Iftekhar as Retired Judge Sinha
- Sudhir Dalvi as Raghu
- Bharat Kapoor as Makhan
- Pinchoo Kapoor as Police Commissioner
- Satyendra Kapoor as Senior Police Inspector
- Arun Bakshi as Police Inspector
- Prema Narayan as Dancer / Singer
- Jayshree T. as Dancer / Singer
- Gurbachan Singh as Dayal
- Madhu Malhotra as Madhu
- Narendra Nath as Lobo
- Ram Mohan as Karim
- Tamanna as Shama
- Vikas Anand as Public Prosecutor

== Crew ==
- Director: Raj N. Sippy
- Producer: Salim Akhtar, Salim Merchant
- Story: Mohan Kaul, Ravi Kapoor, Satyanand
- Dialogue: Kader Khan, N. S. Bedi
- Cinematographer: Anwar Siraj, Mohan
- Editor: Guru Dutt Shirali, Waman B. Bhosle
- Art Director: Babu Rao Poddar
- Costumes Designer: Anna Singh, Dave, Kachins, Shantaram Sawant
- Choreographer: Kamal, Oscar, Suresh Bhatt, Vijay
- Action Director: Veeru Devgan
- Music Director: R. D. Burman
- Lyrics: Majrooh Sultanpuri
- Playback Singer: Asha Bhosle

== Soundtrack ==
Song	Singer
"Aaj Qayamat Ho Gayi"	Asha Bhosle
"Poochho Nahin Dil Mera"	Asha Bhosle
"Ek Aankh To Maare Dank"	Asha Bhosle
"Udhar Se Jo Phursat Mile"	Asha Bhosle
"Aaj Phir Jeene Ki Tamanna Hai" (composed by S. D. Burman and written by Shailendra	Lata Mangeshkar
