= Rajnigandha =

- Directed by: Basu Chatterjee
- Screenplay by: Basu Chatterjee
- Story by: Manu Bhandari
- Based on: "Yehi Sach Hai" by Mannu Bhandari
- Produced by: Suresh Jindal
- Starring: Amol Palekar; Vidya Sinha; Dinesh Thakur
- Cinematography: K. K. Mahajan
- Edited by: G.G. Mayekar
- Music by: Original Score & Songs: Salil Chowdhury Lyrics for songs: Yogesh
- Release date: 13 September 1974
- Running time: 110 minutes
- Country: India
- Language: Hindi

Rajnigandha (transl. Tuberose) is a 1974 Hindi film directed by Basu Chatterjee. It is based on the short story "Yehi Sach Hai" by noted Hindi writer Mannu Bhandari. The movie starred Amol Palekar, Vidya Sinha and Dinesh Thakur in the lead.

Rajnigandha went on to win the Best Picture, the Popular Award and the Critics Award at the Filmfare Awards in 1975. It was considered to have a realistic outlook of urban middle class on cinema in 1974, an era when potboilers were ruling Bollywood, a genre which was later called the Middle Cinema. The film was the first screen role of Vidya Sinha and first Hindi film of Amol Palekar, both of whom went on to work with Basu Chatterjee in many films. Rajnigandha was remade into Bengali in 2012 as Hothat Shedin.

== Plot summary ==
Deepa is a graduate student in Delhi who is in a long-term relationship with Sanjay, whom she plans to marry. Sanjay is a loquacious, humorous, and a good individual who is also rather lackadaisical and forgetful with no sense of punctuality.

A job interview call from a college in Mumbai re-acquaints her with her college boy-friend Navin whom she had split up with under acrimonious circumstances. Navin is in every way the antithesis of Sanjay: He is very punctual and looks after her during her stay in Mumbai. Navin shows her the city and helps her with the job interview. This rekindles Deepa's feelings for him, and she finds herself torn between the two men and between her past and her present. Upon her return to Delhi, she feels that her first love is her true love. She receives a letter stating that she has got the job in Mumbai. At the same time Sanjay comes to her house and tells her that he has got a promotion, which would require him to stay in Delhi. Deepa then feels that she should forget the past and marry Sanjay, opting not to move to Mumbai for the job.

== Cast and crew ==
=== Cast ===
- Amol Palekar as Sanjay
- Vidya Sinha as Deepa Kapoor
- Dinesh Thakur as Naveen
- Veena Goud as Deepa's sister-in-law
- Rajeeta Thakur as Ira
- Master Chicoo as Bunty
- Manju Maini as Bunty's mother
- Satya Prakash
- Biswajeet (special appearance)
- Helen (special appearance)

=== Crew ===
- Director : Basu Chatterjee
- Producer : Suresh Jindal
- Co-Producer : Kamal Saigal
- Editor : G. G. Mayekar
- Cinematographer : K. K. Mahajan
- Costume Designer : Shankhar Gokhale
- Audiographer : Kapil Chandra, Narendra Singh
- Lyrics : Yogesh Gaur
- Music Director : Salil Chowdhury

== Production ==
=== Development ===
The original story, Yahi Sach Hai (1960), written in diary format was by Mannu Bhandari, an important writer of the Nayi Kahani literary movement of Hindi literature in the 1960s. While writing the screenplay, Basu Chatterjee transposed the story from Kanpur and Kolkata to Delhi and Mumbai in the film.

=== Casting ===
Director Basu Chatterjee's original cast was Shashi Kapoor, Sharmila Tagore and Amitabh Bachchan. Then he switched to Bengali actors, Aparna Sen and Samit Bhanja. Even classical dancer Mallika Sarabhai was to be cast as lead, but her final MBA exams clashed and eventually debutante Vidya Sinha got the role after she responded to one of the ads placed by Basu Chatterjee.

This was the first Hindi film of Amol Palekar, who at that time was a less known theater actor. In an interview in 2015 with S.M. Irfan on Rajya Sabha TV, Palekar described the circumstances in which he made this switch to mainstream acting. During one of their meetings at the "Film forum" (one of the leading film societies of Bombay at that time) Basu Chatterjee showed Palekar the story "Yahi Sach Hai" by Mannu Bhandari to read. Once Palekar finished reading it, Chatterjee showed him the script that had been written based on this story. He thereafter asked him if he would like to play the leading role in it. Palekar, a trained artist from the JJ School of art and a theater actor had at that time worked in two Marathi films including Shaantata Court Chaalu Aahe, by Satyadev Dubey and Govind Nihalani.

=== Filming ===
The principal photography of the film started with 20-day schedule in Mumbai in 1972, which wrapped up in 16 days. This was followed by a 15-day schedule in Delhi. However, after that the film's producer, Suresh Jindal who was also a first time film producer struggled for the next two years to obtain the remaining funding. A potential distributor even offered finance for the film if it was reshot with a different lead actor. The film was completed eventually in 1974 with same leads.

== Soundtrack ==
The film's music director was Salil Chowdhury rendered commercially successful tracks and the songs were written by Yogesh. Mukesh sang "Kai Baar Yuheen Dekha hai," for which he won the National Film Award for Best Male Playback Singer.

All lyrics are written by Yogesh; all music is composed by Salil Chowdhury.

No.	Title	Singer(s)	Length
1.	"Kai Baar Yuheen Dekha hai"	Mukesh	3:22
2.	"Rajnigandha Phool Tumhaare"	Lata Mangeshkar	3:24

== Release ==
On 6 September 1974, a trial show, where Rajshri Productions bought the Mumbai territory for distribution, the film was first released with single print at All India Radio's Akashwani theatre in South Mumbai. Thereafter through word of mouth, the film gained rapid publicity, and became a sleeper hit, spreading to many theatres. Actor Amol Palekar who made his Hindi film debut with the film, went on to make 'Debut Silver Jubilee Hatrick' with subsequent Basu Chatterjee films, Chhoti Si Baat (1975) and Chitchor (1976), and all Silver Jubilee hits in Mumbai.

== Awards and nominations ==
Year	Category	Cast/Crew member	Status
National Film Award
1974	Best Male Playback Singer	Mukesh for "Kai Baar Yoon Bhi Dekha Hai"	Won
Filmfare Award
1975	Critics Award for Best Movie	Basu Chatterjee	Won
1975	Best Film	Suresh Jindal (for Devki Chitra)	Won
BFJA Awards
1975	Best Editor Award	G. G. Mayekar	Won
1975	Best Indian Films Award	-	Won
