= Parvatibai Athavale =

Indian social reformer

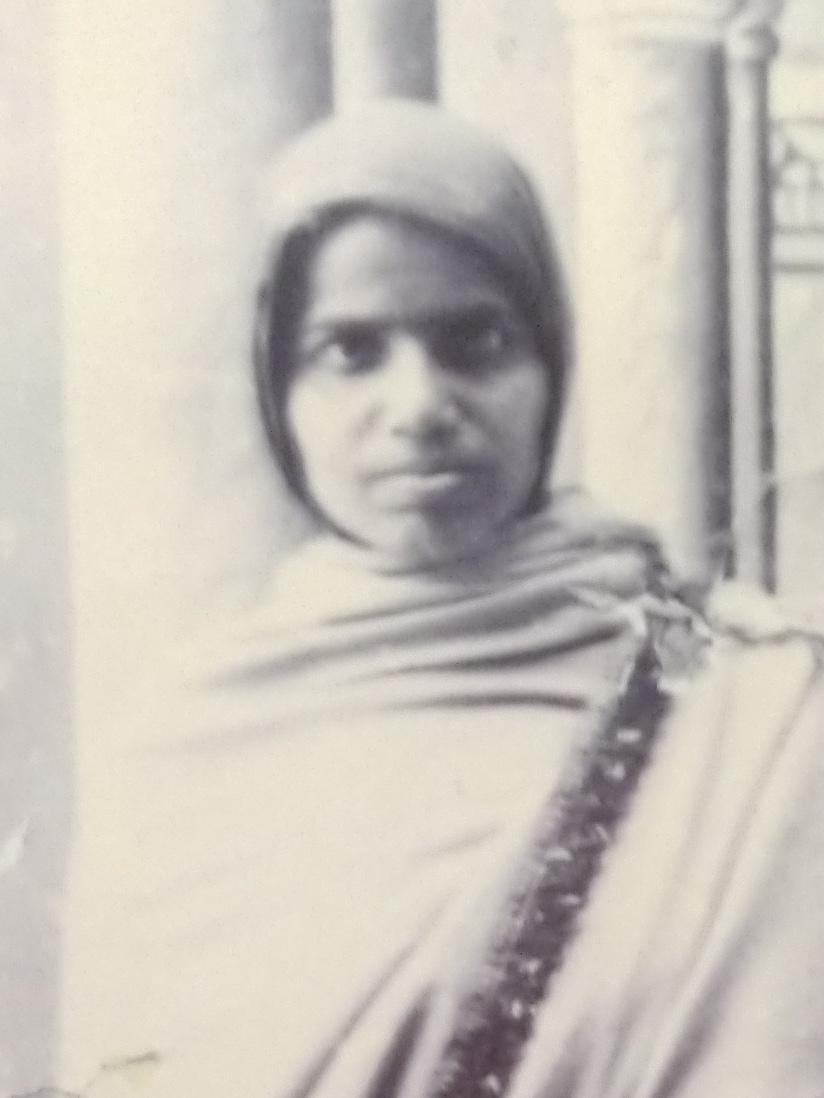
- Born: Krishna Joshi; 1870
- Died: 1955 (aged 84–85)
- Notable work: My Story: The Autobiography of a Hindu Widow

Parvatibai Athavale (1870–1955) was an Indian social reformer and women's education advocate, who worked closely with the social reformer Dhondo Keshav Karve. She made major contributions in the social upliftment of women, particularly Hindu widows.

Parvatibai was born in 1870 in Devrukh, a small town in the Kokan region, on the west coast of India. Her maiden name was Krishna Joshi. She married Mahadev Narayan Athavale at the age of eleven. She gave birth to three children after her marriage, but only one son survived.

== Widowhood ==
At the age of 21, her husband died suddenly. After his death, Parvatibai's head was shaved and her jewellery removed, in line with prevailing practices of the time for Brahmin widows.

Parvatibai became the first student at Karve's Hindu Widows' Home when it was established in 1896. She subsequently worked at the institution as both an educator and administrator. The institution was founded to help widows support themselves. She later travelled to the United States to raise funds for widow education programs.

After working at the Widows' Home, Parvatibai decided that substantive change required her to lead by example. In 1912, she decided to stop shaving her head and abandoned her widow's garments. Despite facing social criticism, she maintained her position.

== Reform Philosophy ==
Parvatibai's approach to widow reform, as noted in her autobiography, extended beyond high-caste women. She described traditional practices that affected widows from various backgrounds.

Parvatibai's autobiography has been translated to English by the American Christian missionary, Justin E. Abbott in 1930 as My Story: The Autobiography of a Hindu Widow.
