= Shiravali =

Village in Maharashtra

- Village
- Interactive map of Shiravali
- Coordinates: , 17.75248186714549°N 73.44699170896894°E
- Country: India
- State: Maharashtra
- District: Ratnagiri
- Tehsil: Lanja

Population (2011)
  - Total: 368

Shiravali is a small village in Ratnagiri district, Maharashtra state in Western India. The 2011 Census of India recorded a total of 867 residents in the village. Shiravali's geographical area is approximately 531 hectares (1,310 acres).

== Birth Place ==
The village is the birthplace of the following Personalities

- Vishnubawa Brahmachari. Hindu revivalist
- Dhondo Keshav Karve a social reformer work in the field of women's welfare.
