= Satyamev Jayate (film) =

- Poster
- Directed by: Raj N. Sippy
- Written by: Vinay Shukla
- Based on: Aavanazhi by T. Damodaran
- Produced by: Romu N. Sippy
- Starring: Vinod Khanna; Meenakshi Sheshadri; Madhavi; Anita Raj; Anupam Kher
- Cinematography: Anwar Siraj
- Edited by: Ashok Honda
- Music by: Bappi Lahiri
- Release date: 18 June 1987 (India)
- Country: India
- Language: Hindi

Satyamev Jayate (transl. Truth alone triumphs) is a 1987 Indian Hindi-language action film, directed by Raj N. Sippy. It stars Vinod Khanna, Meenakshi Sheshadri and Madhavi, with Anita Raj, A. K. Hangal, Renu Joshi, Alankar, Neeta Puri, Saahil Chadha, Satyen Kappu, Sudhir Dalvi, Vinod Mehra, Shakti Kapoor and Anupam Kher.

The film is a remake of the Malayalam film Aavanazhi. The film was a comeback film for Vinod Khanna and emerged a box office success. Vinod Khanna’s performance as a police officer was critically acclaimed and is regarded as one of his best. The song "Dil Mein Ho Tum” gained popularity.

== Plot ==
Inspector Arjun Singh (Vinod Khanna) of Mumbai Police has attained the sordid reputation of being a ruthless policeman. When a young man is killed in custody, Arjun is transferred to a small town Tehsil. Arjun denies these charges and asserts in vain, that the death was not his fault.

Arjun relocates to Tehsil and finds to his horror that the family of the young man who died are his neighbors. Arjun must come to terms with his past and investigate the circumstances of the young man's death. Arjun comes face to face with Vidya (Anita Raj) his ex-flame who is now the wife of a corrupt lawyer (Anupam Kher). Pooja (Madhavi) is the sister of the dead young man and in doing all she can to get him justice gets embroiled with a notorious criminal due to the evil machinations of the corrupt lawyer. Arjun finds solace in alcoholism and Seema (Meenakshi Sheshadri), a sex worker.

== Cast ==
- Vinod Khanna as Inspector Arjun Singh
- Meenakshi Sheshadri as Seema
- Madhavi as Pooja Shastri
- Anita Raj as Vidya Kaul
- Anupam Kher as Advocate Amar Kaul
- Shakti Kapoor as Chaman Bagga
- Gulshan Grover as Satyaprakash
- Vinod Mehra as Inspector Mirza
- Om Shivpuri as Minister Yashpal
- Asrani as Mewaram
- Bharat Kapoor as Inspector Ravi Verma
- Viju Khote as Police Constable Dabu
- A. K. Hangal as Mr Shastri
- Subbiraj as Police Commissioner Prithvi Singh
- Ram Mohan as SP Baburao Rana
- Sudhir Dalvi as Mr. Mishra

== Soundtrack ==
Lyrics: Farooq Kaiser

Song	Singer
"Dil Mein Ho Tum" (Female)	S. Janaki
"Dil Mein Ho Tum" (Male)	Bappi Lahiri
"Dil Mein Ho Tum" (Sad)	Bappi Lahiri
"Tan Hai Hamara"	Shailendra Singh
"De Rahi Duayen"	Kavita Krishnamurthy
"De Rahi Duayen" (Sad)	Kavita Krishnamurthy
"Tu Jaan Se Pyaara Hai"	Mitali Mukherjee
