= Raghunath Dhondo Karve =

Indian activist (1882–1953)

Raghunath Karve
- रघुनाथ कर्वे
- Born: Raghunath Dhondo Karve; 14 January 1882; Murud, Ratnagiri, British India
- Died: 14 October 1953 (aged 71); Mumbai, India
- Education: New English High School, Pune
- Alma mater: Fergusson College, Pune (B.A.); Wilson College, Mumbai (professional career)
- Occupations: Professor, social reformer, sex educator
- Known for: Pioneering family planning and birth control in India
- Spouse: Malati Raghunath Karve
- Parents: Dhondo Keshav Karve (father); Radhabai Karve (mother); Godubai Karve (step-mother)
- Website: www.radhonkarve.com

Raghunath Dhondo Karve (14 January 1882 – 14 October 1953) was a professor of mathematics, sex educator and a social reformer from Maharashtra, India. He was a pioneer in initiating family planning and birth control for masses in Mumbai in 1921.

== Early life ==
Born in a Chitpavan Brahmin family, Raghunath was the eldest son of Maharshi Dhondo Keshav Karve. His mother Radhabai died during childbirth in 1891, when he was nine. He was born in Murud. He studied at New English School, Pune. He stood first in a matriculation examination conducted in 1899. He went to Fergusson College, Pune where he obtained a Bachelor of Arts degree in 1904. Karve started his professional career as a professor of mathematics at Wilson College in Mumbai. However, when he started publicly expressing his views about family planning, population control, and women's right to experience sexual/sensual pleasure as much as men, the conservative Christian administrators of the college asked him to resign from the professorship. He then devoted himself to the above causes.

On his own initiative, Karve started the very first birth control clinic in India in 1921, the same year when the first birth control clinic opened in London.

== Support ==
Karve's wife, Malati, supported his cause though it brought them social ostracism besides his loss of his professorial career. She shared the couple's financial responsibility, and the two chose to remain childless.

Apart from his wife, he had support of Dr. B. R. Ambedkar, Wrangler R.P. Paranjape, Riyastkar S.G. Sardesai, and Mama Warerkar.

== Magazine ==
In 1927 Karve began publishing a Marathi magazine Samaj Swasthya (समाजस्वास्थ्य, transl. Health of Society), issued monthly. In it, he continually discussed issues of society's wellbeing through population control by use of contraceptives so as prevent unwanted pregnancies and induced abortions. He promoted responsible parenting by men, gender equality, and women's empowerment and right to experience sexual and sensual pleasure. As an illustration of some of Karve's radical thoughts, he expressed the thought that so long as childbirth and venereal diseases are prevented, women could engage in promiscuity—even perhaps with male prostitutes—for the sake of variety in sexual pleasure, if they so desire, without, in fact, harming their husbands. Published from 1927 until Karve's death in October 1953, all the issues of this magazine are now available online.

== Books authored ==
- Santatiniyaman Aachar ani Vichar ('Family planning: thoughts and action'; 1923)
- Guptrogapasun Bachav and Aadhunik Kaamashastra
- Adhunik Kamashastra (1934)
- Adhunik Aharshastra (1938)
- Vaishya Vyavasay (1940), which had a scientific approach.
- Some of his other, lighter-themed, books were Parischya Ghari (1946) and 13 Goshti (1940)

== Critical analysis ==
Literary critic M V Dhond has written three essays on Karve. In the third essay, he analyses why Karve was not as successful in his mission as much as Margaret Sanger and Marie Stopes, his counterparts in United States and UK, respectively.

Developments in understanding and social acceptance of woman's sexuality occurred subsequent to Karve's death:

- Publication of the Kinsey report in 1953;
- Publication of Masters and Johnson's book in 1966; and
- Publication of The Hite Report in 1976.

=== Works on Karve ===
- "Ra. Dho. Karve" (र. धो. कर्वे) by Yashawant Dinkar Phadke, 1981 (in Marathi)
- "'Samajswastya'kar"- a biography of R.D.Karve by Dr. Anant Deshmukh, Padmagandha Prakashan, 2010
- "Maharashtrache Shilpakaar – Ra Dho Karve" -a biography by Dr Anant Deshmukh, (2013)
- "Ra. Dho. Karve" (र. धो. कर्वे) : Vyaktitva aani kartrutva by Dr. Anant Deshmukh (2010)
- "'Samajswastya'til nivadak lekh" edited by Dr. Anant Deshmukh, Padmagandha Prakashan, 2010
- "Mopansa'chya katha" edited by Dr. Anant Deshmukh, Padmagandha Prakashan, 2010
- "Buddhipramanyawad (translated by Prof. Madhukar Toradmal)" edited by Dr. Anant Deshmukh, Padmagandha Prakshan, 2010
- "Asangrahita R.D.Karve" edited by Dr. Anant Deshmukh, Padmagandha Prakashan, 2010
- "R.D.Karve-Mate aani Matantare" edited by Dr. Anant Deshmukh, Padmagandha Prakashan, 2010
- "Shesha Samajswastya" edited by Dr. Anant Deshmukh, Padmagandha Prakashan, 2010
- "Nivadak 'Sharadechi Patre'" edited by Dr. Anant Deshmukh, Padmagandha Prakashan, 2010
- Research articles on R. D. Karve by Dr. Anant Deshmukh
- Raghunathrao Dhondo Karve – Ek drashta purush – Article in Loksatta by Dr Anant Deshmukh 12-Jan-2003
- Avaghe Ra Dho (अवघे ‘रधों’) – Article in Loksatta 10-Oct-2010
- "Majhe Puran" by Anandibai Karve, 1951 (Marathi)
- "Kahi Ambat Kahi God" by Shakuntala Paranjape, 1979 (Marathi)
- "Upekshit Drashta" by Diwakar Bapat, 1971 (Marathi)
- Marathi novel based on R D Karve's life: "Raghunathachi Bakhar" (रघुनाथाची बखर) by S J Joshi (श्री ज जोशी), 1976
- National family health survey (NFHS-2), India, 1998–99
- The Journal of Family Welfare By Family Planning Association of India
- National family health survey (MCH and family planning)
- Marathi film on the life of R. D. Karve: Dhyasparva (2001), directed by Amol Palekar

Article Title	Publication	Date
Ra. Dho.Karve yanchya aayushyatil Nairobiparva	Loksatta	14 October 2001
Kutumbaniyajanache aadhya purskarte	Navashakti	11 November 2001
Lok bhitat mhanun	Mahanagar	9 February 2002
Raghunathrao Karve aani char French grahasta	Mahanagar	23 February 2002
Prof. Ra. Dhon. Karve aani Dr.Manoramabai Thatte-wad	Mahanagar	9 March 2002
Raghunthravanchya hatche don durmil lekh	Mahanagar	27 April 2002
Karve aani Karve	Mahanagar	23 March 2002
Raghunathrav aani Narhapant Joshi	Mahanagar	20 April 2002
Raghunathravanche prashansak aani virodhak:Ke.Bha.Lele	Mahanagar	6 April 2002
Ra.Dhon.Karve, ganitache uchcha shikshan va Paris	Mahanagar	21 September 2002
Raghunathrao Karve aani Shankarrao Kirliskar	Mahanagar	7 September 2002
Shastriya sangeeache jankar Ra. Dhon.Karve	Mahanagar	5 October 2002
Raghunathrao, Gandhiji aani santatiniyamana	Mahanagar	4 January 2002
Raghunathrao Karve aani Shakuntala Paranjapye	Mahanagar	13 July 2002
Raghunathrao Karve aani Manoramabai Khabade-wadachya nimittane	Mahanagar	27 July 2002
Captain Pillai aani Shree Rhushi: Doghanchya don tarha	Mahanagar	24 August 2002
Prof.Karve aani Prof. Phadke	Mahanagar	29 June 2002
Raghunathrao karve, Prabhakar Padhye va V.Shantaram	Mahanagar	25 May 2002
Samajswasthamadhil lakshavedhak lekhan	Mahanagar	10 August 2002
Raghunathravanche 'Jeevan' masikatil lekhan	Mahanagar	14 December 2002
Samajswastha' tikave mhanun wachakanchya suchana	Mahanagar	26 October 2002
Raghunathrawansambandhichicha pahila vyaktichitratmak lekh	Mahanagar	22 June 2002
Raghunathrawanche 'Vasundhare'til lekhan	Mahanagar	8 June 2002
Raghunathrao, Dr.Robinson va Dr.Ellis	Mahanagar	23 November 2002
Prof.R.D.Karve yanche samikshatma lekhan	Mahanagar	11 January 2003
Shodha Raghunathrawancha	Mahanagar	1 February 2003
Dr.Ya.Di.Phadake yana anavruta patra	Mahanagar	8 February 2003
'Samajswasthya'kar: Lekhakachi bhumika	Lalit	Diwali 2004
Soshik Samajsevika	Lokprabha	Diwali 2001
Ra.dhon.Karve, Ra.Shri.Jog aani Mardhekar	Zapurza	Diwali 2003
Ra.Dhon.Karve:Shodhayatra	Audumbar	Diwali 2004
Akher	Dharmabhaskar	Diwali 2002
Saradechi patre	Dharmabhaskar	Diwali 2005

== In popular culture ==
In 2001, the Marathi-language film Dhyaas Parva was released, starring Kishor Kadam as Karve. Written by Chitra Palekar and directed by Amol Palekar, the film won numerous awards.

In 2017, the Marathi-language play Samajswasthya (named after Karve's sexual health magazine of the same name) was performed in Pune, starring Girish Kulkarni as Karve and Rajshree Sawant as his wife Malati.
