= Vishnubawa Brahmachari =

19th-century Hindu revivalist

- Born: Vishnu Bhikaji Gokhale; 20 July 1825; Shiravali, Thana District, British India
- Died: 18 February 1871 (aged 48–49); Bombay, British India
- Other names: Brahmachari Bawa
- Occupation: Hindu missionary
- Known for: Hindu revivalist
- Title: Bawa

Vishnu Bhikaji Gokhale (1825–1871), popularly known as Vishnubawa Brahmachari and as Brahmachari Bawa, was a 19th-century Marathi Hindu revivalist. An ascetic defender of the Hindu dharma, he was known for his religious polemics, chiefly against Christianity. He was known for his "witty repartee and vigorous argument" confronting Christian missionaries and, occasionally, other Hindus. His 1857 debates in Bombay were widely publicized in English and Marathi in at least nine books. He has been described variously as "the first great revivalist of modern Maharashtra," "predecessor of the two great swamis of modern times, Dayananda and Vivekananda," and "a queer bird."

== Biography ==
Brahmachari was born Vishnu Bhikaji Gokhale on 20 July 1825 in the village of Shirvali (Taluka - Mangaon, District - Raigad) as the tenth child of a Chitpavan Brahman family. Educated in a village school for a few years, he also studied the Vedas. He arrived in Bombay in September 1856. He was the author of "The Marathi avatar of The Communist Manifesto." He died on a Mahashivarathri day in the Viththal Mandir in Bombay on 18 February 1871.

Vishnubawa had established Shri Dattaguru paduka at Shirvali. The Vishnubuva Brahmachari Samajik Kendra has been formed to propagate the thoughts and life mission of Vishnubawa.

== See also ==
- Hindu revivalism
- Dayananda Saraswati
- Swami Vivekananda
