= Nippulanti Manishi (1986 film) =

1986 Indian film by S. B. Chakravarthy

- Theatrical release poster
- Directed by: S. B. Chakravarthy
- Written by: Satyanand (dialogues)
- Screenplay by: S. B. Chakravarthy
- Story by: Mohan Kaul; Ravi Kapoor
- Based on: Qayamat (1983)
- Produced by: Midde Rama Rao
- Starring: Nandamuri Balakrishna; Radha; Sarath Babu
- Cinematography: N. Sudhakar Reddy
- Edited by: D. Venkataratnam
- Music by: Chakravarthy
- Production company: Sri Rajalakshmi Art Pictures
- Release date: 7 February 1986
- Running time: 130 minutes
- Country: India
- Language: Telugu

Nippulanti Manishi (transl. Fire-like Man) is a 1986 Indian Telugu-language action film written and directed by S. B. Chakravarthy. The film stars Nandamuri Balakrishna, Radha and Sarath Babu, with music composed by Chakravarthy. It is a remake of the Hindi film Qayamat (1983).

== Plot ==
The film begins with a justice-seeking ruffian, Parasuram, who uproars against anti-social elements and stands as a pillar for the destitute. Once, he is enraged by the news of returning a tycoon, Raja, from abroad and spins rearward: Parasuram is incredibly darling, Radha. Raja entices and aspires to subjugate her when Parasuram smacks him. As a result, the demonic slays Radha on the turtle doves' wedding stage, and the court acquits him as non-guilty. Thus, Parasuram establishes a new judiciary to control the system. Presently, he slaughters Raja for granted. Since Parasuram turns a diehard to law & order, the department appoints a stout-hearted cop, ACP Vijay, to snare him.

At that point, Vijay is startled to view the file as Parasuram is his childhood bestie by whose benefit he acquired esteem. Now, the two contact and embrace when Parasuram proclaims there is no chance of his retrieval. Plus, he takes a word from Vijay not to yield his path for their friendship. Besides, Vijay apprehends a dangerous gangster, Jakki, with the aid of Parasuram when the knave animosities on both. Next, Parasuram's difference of opinion with a big shot, Bhujanga Rao, so he conspires with a prostitute, Pankajam, and incriminates him under the charge of molesting a girl, Swapna, when Vijay seizes him. Further, Bhujanga Rao creates a rift between the soulmates where Parasuram misconstrues Vijay. As of today, Parasuram has been penalized for seven years when he pledged to reimburse all who are accountable for his moving point.

Time passes, and Parasuram frees up and seeks vengeance. Consecutively, he tactically eliminates Bhujanga Rao & Pankajam, leaving any piece of evidence. Soon, he approaches Vijay, who leads a delightful life with his wife Lakshmi and sister Aasha, who resemble Radha. Parasuram shows a threat to Aasha, who beset her to make Vijay's life a nightmare. Being conscious of it, Vijay is an onslaught on Parasuram when they declare warfare. Parallelly, Vijay sends away Aasha for her safety when Jakki abducts her on behalf of Parasuram. Here, Vijay flares up strikes to attack. Anyhow, Parasuram safeguards Aasha, though he makes various attempts to molest Aasha, and he backs recollecting his love for Radha. Then, Aasha discerns his virtue and endears him. Forthwith, the gallants keep pace with face-to-face, and battle erupts. In the interim, Jakki again hits Aasha when Parasuram rescues her. Spotting it, Vijay comprehends the eminence of Parasuram and mutually pleads for pardon. At last, Vijay offers Parasuram to accept Aasha's hand, which he does so. Finally, the movie ends on a happy note with the marriage of Parasuram & Aasha.

== Cast ==
- Nandamuri Balakrishna as Parasuram
- Radha as Radha & Aasha (Dual role)
- Sarath Babu as Vijay
- Nutan Prasad as Bhujanga Rao
- Rajeev as Jacky
- Raj Varma as Raja
- Hema Sundar as Keshava
- P. J. Sarma as IGP Ranga Rao
- Suthi Velu as Dumbu & Lambu (Dual role)
- K. K. Sarma as Govindaiah
- Narra Venkateswara Rao as Masthan
- Potti Prasad as Rangaiah
- Bhimiswara Rao as Judge
- Telephone Satyanarayana as Lawyer
- Madan Mohan
- Rajya Lakshmi as Lakshmi
- Sri Lakshmi as Chukkamma
- Varalakshmi as Mahalakshmi
- Silk Smitha as item number
- Anuradha as item number
- Babita as item number
- Sundari as Swapna
- Y. Vijaya as Pankajam

== Soundtrack ==
Music composed by Chakravarthy. Lyrics were written by Veturi.

No.	Title	Singer(s)	Length
1.	"Bolthaa Kottavante"	S. P. Balasubrahmanyam, P. Susheela	4:11
2.	"Maa Amma Kothimeraku"	P. Susheela, S. P. Sailaja	4:05
3.	"Nee Tholi Choopulone"	S. P. Balasubrahmanyam, P. Susheela	3:55
4.	"Iruku Iruku Raikalo"	S. P. Balasubrahmanyam, S. Janaki	4:17
5.	"Yama Yamagaa"	S. P. Balasubrahmanyam, P. Susheela	4:20
