= Mukti (1977 film) =

- Poster
- Directed by: Raj Tilak
- Screenplay by: Dhruva Chatterjee; Keka Chatterjee; Renu Khanna; Kader Khan
- Story by: Dhruva Chatterjee
- Produced by: Raj Tilak; Tilak Movies Pvt. Ltd.
- Starring: Shashi Kapoor; Sanjeev Kumar; Vidya Sinha; Mithun Chakraborty
- Cinematography: K. K. Mahajan
- Edited by: Pran Mehra; R. P. Bapat
- Music by: Rahul Dev Burman; Anand Bakshi (lyrics)
- Production companies: Essel Studios; Famous Cine Studios; Natraj Studios; R. K. Studios; Rajkamal Kalamandir Studios
- Distributed by: Sangeeta Film Corporation (India); Yash Raj Films (USA)
- Release date: 14 August 1977
- Running time: 125 minutes
- Country: India
- Language: Hindi
- Budget: ₹ 1.2 Crores

Mukti (transl. Liberation) is a 1977 Indian Hindi-language romantic drama film directed by Raj Tilak, starring Shashi Kapoor, Sanjeev Kumar, Vidya Sinha and Mithun Chakraborty.

== Plot ==
Kailash Sharma is found guilty of sexually molesting Shanno and killing Dheeraj Kumar Verma, and is sentenced to be hanged by the Jammu & Kashmir Sessions Court. After his appeals at both High and Supreme Courts fail, he asks his wife, Seema, to take their daughter, Pinky, and re-locate elsewhere. Seema and Pinky re-locate to Bombay where she takes up sewing to make a living. She befriends their neighbour, Ratan, and both get married. 14 years later Pinky has grown up and has a boyfriend, Vikram, who she wants to marry. Meanwhile, Kailash, who is still alive, as his sentence was changed to life imprisonment, arrives in Bombay to look for his family. After sometime he does find them but decides not to interfere in their lives as they appear to be happy. But when Seema finds out she goes to meet him secretly – a visit that will set off a chain of events that will end up drastically changing their lives forever.

== Cast ==
- Shashi Kapoor as Kailash Sharma
- Sanjeev Kumar as Ratan
- Vidya Sinha as Seema K. Sharma
- Vikram as Vikram
- Bindiya Goswami as Pinky K. Sharma
- Anju Mahendru as Shanno
- Prema Narayan as Mary
- Deven Verma as Tony
- Kader Khan as Hussain
- A. K. Hangal as Colonel
- Roopesh Kumar as Dheeraj Kumar Verma
- Master Bittu as Young Pinky K. Sharma
- Dev Kumar
- Sapru
- Murad
- Brahm Bhardwaj
- Pinchoo Kapoor as Vikram's Father
- Bhagwan
- Mithun Chakraborty (cameo)
- Neelam Mehra (cameo)

== Music ==
- Song "Suhaani Chaandni Raatein" was listed at #8 on Binaca Geetmala annual list 1977

| Song | Singer | Raga |
|---|---|---|
| "Main Jo Chala Peekar, Woh Cheez Buri Hai Magar" | Kishore Kumar, Asha Bhosle | |
| "Pyar Hai Ek Nishan" (Happy) | Mohammed Rafi | |
| "Pyar Hai Ek Nishan" (Sad) | Mohammed Rafi | |
| "Suhani Chandni Raaten" | Mukesh | Darbari Kanada |
| "Lalla Lalla Lori" (Male) | Mukesh | |
| "Lalla Lalla Lori" (Female) | Lata Mangeshkar | |
| "Dil Sajan Jalta Hai" | Asha Bhosle | |
