= Zakhmi Rooh =

1993 film

Zakhmi Rooh (Wounded Soul) is a 1993 Hindi horror film of Bollywood directed by Pawan Kumar and produced by Balwinder Sandhi.

== Plot ==
This is the story of twin sisters Rima and Sima. Rima is attracted to a boy named Shekhar, who is already in love with Sima. Broken hearted, Rima goes to their father but is entrapped by some unholy persons who rape and kill her. Now her soul revives with a vengeful intention.

== Cast ==
- Javed Jaffrey as Shekhar
- Moon Moon Sen as Rima/Sima
- Raj Kiran as Rocky
- Urmila Bhatt as Shekhar's mother
- Mac Mohan as Mak
- Puneet Issar
- Shiva Rindani as Sanki
- Dinesh Thakur
- Kamal Kapoor as Rima and Sima's father
- Harish Kumar
- Jay Kalgutkar
- Seema Vaz
- Pushpa Verma

== Music ==
Composer: Nandi Duggal Lyrics: Dilip Tahir

- "Aaja Aaja Meri Bahon Mein Aa" - Amit Kumar
- "Ang Se Ang Mila Le" - Asha Bhosle
- "Kisne Samjha Kisne Jaana" - Asha Bhosle
- "Tu Hain Mera, Main Hoon Teri" - Amit Kumar, Asha Bhosle
- "Dil Mera Tu Le Le" - Nandi Duggal
- "Kehta Hoon Zamane Se" - Nandi Duggal
- "Teri Tapti Jawani" - Abhijeet Bhattacharya, Dilraj Kaur
