= Cummins College of Engineering for Women, Nagpur =

College in Maharashtra, India

MKSSS's Cummins College of Engineering for Women, Nagpur
- Motto: Empowerment of women through education
- Established: 2010
- Chairman: Shri Milind Kukde
- Students: ~850 (female)
- Location: Mouje Sukli (Gupchup); Nagpur, Nagpur, Maharashtra, India; 21.0669652°N 78.9789163°E
- Campus: 52609.1 sq.m
- Website: https://cumminscollege.edu.in

MKSSS's Cummins College of Engineering for Women, Nagpur (CCOEW, Nagpur) is a private engineering college with NAAC (A+) Accreditation in Nagpur, Maharashtra, India, run by Maharshi Karve Stree Shikshan Samstha.

== History ==
Maharshi Karve Stree Shikshan Samstha, (MKSSS),

MKSSS's, Pune established first women engineering college in Pune called MKSSS's Cummins College of Engineering for Women, Over the course of 119 years the Parent organization has branched out more institutions in other districts in Maharashtra State. The institutes are located at Pune, Nagpur, Satara, Wai, Ratnagiri, Kamshet, etc. The Cummins College of Engineering for Women Located in Nagpur is affiliated to Rashtrasant Tukadoji Maharaj Nagpur University

== Academics ==
Cummins College of Engineering, Nagpur provides undergraduate programs in various disciplines of engineering such as Allied Sciences which are also related to Research and Development, Computer Engineering, Electronics and Telecommunications Engineering, Mechanical Engineering and Consultancy.

== Campus Facilities ==
The campus is spread across 13 acres near river Vena in Nagpur. Cummins College features a hostel facility for all outstation students that can house up to 180 students currently, which is to be extended to 700 students shortly. Transportation facilities are also provided for day scholars who attend the college. The institution also features grounds for activities such as Kabaddi, Badminton, Cricket and Volleyball. Indoor arenas are available for Table Tennis, Carrom and Chess.
