= Maharshi Karve Stree Shikshan Samstha =

Indian institution for women's education

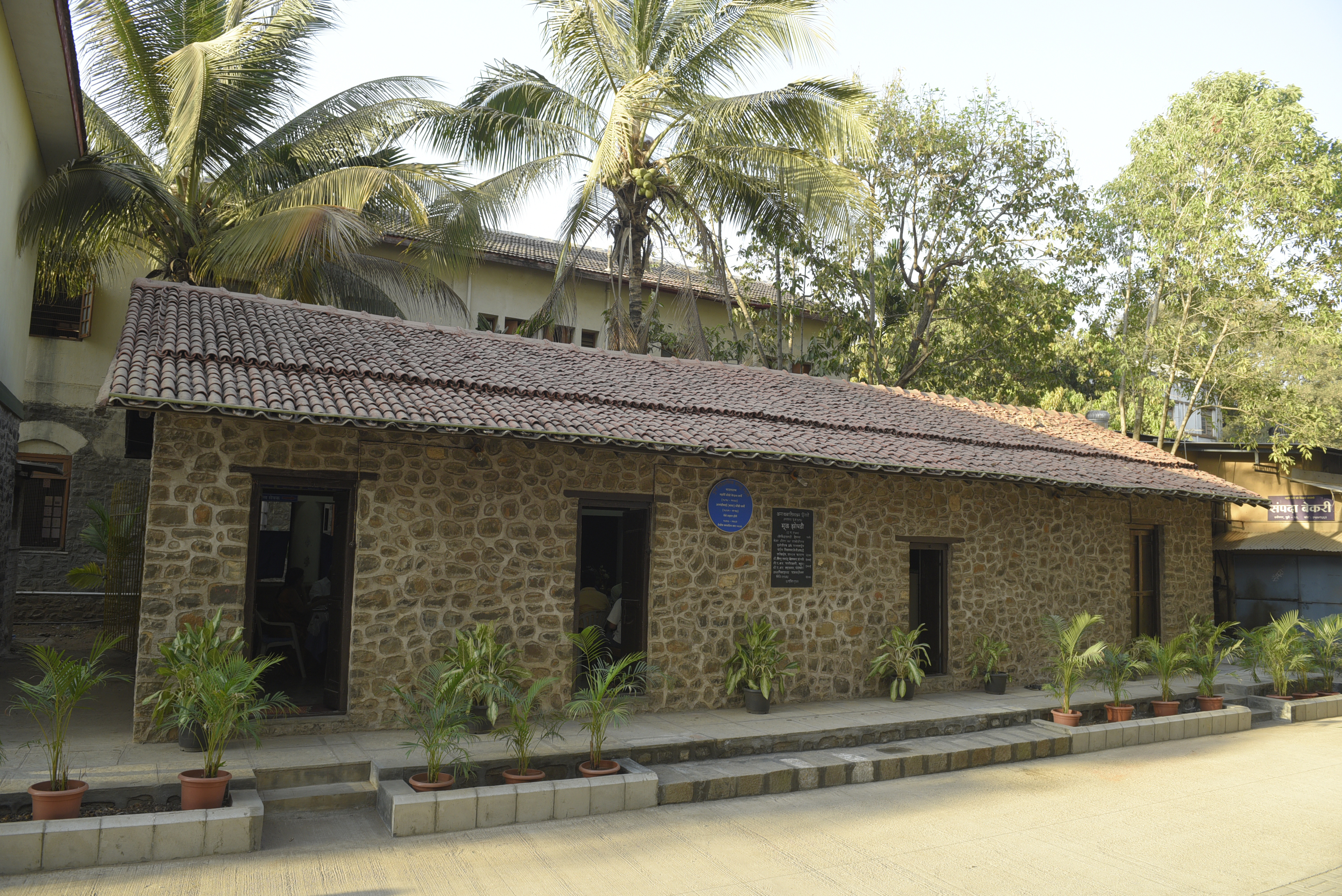
Maharshi Karve Stree Shikshan Samstha, Karvenagar, Pune

Maharshi Karve Stree Shikshan Samstha is an education society engaged in women's education in Pune, Maharashtra, India. It was set up by Dhondo Keshav Karve in 1896 as Hingane Stree Shikshan Samstha.

== History ==
In 1896, Dhondo Keshav Karve founded an institution in a village named Hingne near Pune city. Karve dedicated his life for the humanitarian objective which was upliftment of women which formed the major section of socially downtrodden during that period.

On 14 June 1896, Karve started "Home for widows" along with the school for widows in a small village named Hingne in Pune. His sister-in-law, Parvatibai Athavale, was the first student at the school. The Home for Widows was then named "Hingne Stree Shikshan Samstha" and the school was named "Mahilashram High School". Later the institution was renamed "Maharshi Karve Stree Shikshan Samstha".

The institution has expanded and is running 60 educational units having diversified branches all over Maharashtra with units located at Pune, Wai, Ratnagiri, Nagpur, Kamshet, etc. All these units are meant only for girls. The institution has now established branches like engineering, architecture, management, nursing, fashion technology, vocational training institute, Etc.

== Rankings ==
University rankings

Engineering – India
- NIRF (2024): 201-300

The National Institutional Ranking Framework (NIRF) ranked the university between 201-300 in the engineering rankings in 2024.

== Institutes run by Shikshan Samstha ==
- 1991 - Cummins College of Engineering for Women
- 1994 - Dr. Bhanuben Nanavati College of Architecture for women
- 1996 - Hiraben Nanavati Institute of Management and Research
- 1998 - School Of Fashion Technology, Pune
- M. N. Institute of Vocational Training
- K. B. Joshi Institute of Information Technology
- Cummins College of Engineering for Women, Nagpur
