= Mera Jiwan =

- Directed by: Bindoo Shukla
- Produced by: Hasmukh Kothari
- Starring: Naresh ji, chandrika , Satyen Kappu; Vidya Sinha
- Music by: Sapan Jagmohan
- Distributed by: Everest Entertainment Pvt. Ltd.
- Release date: 1 January 1976
- Country: India
- Language: Hindi

Mera Jiwan (Hindi: मेरा जीवन; translation: My Life) is a Hindi drama film released on 1 January 1976. Produced by Hasmukh Kothari and directed by Bindoo Shukla. The film stars Vidya Sinha, Dushyanth, Ambika Johar and Satyen Kappu. The film's music is by Sapan Jagmohan.

It is a story concerning life, depicting life through the lives of certain characters of the film. It explains to us the meaning of life, whether its lone, devotion or human good. Basically this film is a hindi remake of Bengali movie 'Kancher Swarga'(কাঁচের স্বর্গ) of 1962 directed by 'Yatrik'.

== Plot ==
The story starts in a small village Belapur, situated in deep picturesque interior of country. In this village a sweet girl Sandhya is suffering from a heart disease. Her brother Biharilal takes the girl to a big city hospital. They happen to meet young doctor Anand in this hospital. He is a devoted young man very much interested in medical research. He is in the best books of senior doctors of the hospital.

Sandhya had lost hope but Anand kindles the ray of hope in her mind. Once, while she is sitting sad and forlorn he gives her a flower telling her life though short is yet very sweet. Sandhya is highly impressed, but due to her brother's fear of risking her life, she could not be operated there. They returned. Anand had to face an unexpected tragedy. He was rusticated from medical college for breaking college rules and regulations and his studies were disrupted for three years.

He was going home when he came across. Dr. Tyagi, an old retired doctor who was spending last years of his life attending the sick from village to village. He was like a moving hospital. Dr. Tyagi took Anand along with him, but after few days Tyagi's death gave Anand another shock of his life. Now Anand had no future. He was like a lost traveler. Stresses and strains of fortune led him to Belapur where he had to work as a doctor in a small hospital. He was a doctor without degree and was working in the hospital illegally.

He happened to meet Sandhya under a barren tree in the village. Anand remembered how deeply he had studied the case of this girl and how she left the city hospital without being operated. Sandhya's life was like a barren tree in Anand's company. She felt a new hope of spring vibrating in her being. One day Sandhya had a severe heart attack. In the village hospital there was no equipment for her heart operation, yet her operation was a must. She was in a very critical condition and she could not be taken to the city due to the long journey. Anand felt Sandhya's life could be saved but other doctors of the hospital were not in the favor of operation being done, owing to lack of equipment.

== Cast ==
- Vidya Sinha
- Dushyanth
- Ambika Johar
- Satyen Kappu
- A. K. Hangal
- Harindra Nath Chattopadhyay

== Crew ==
- Director - Bindoo Shukla
- Producer - Hasmukh Kothari
- Music Director - Sapan Jagmohan
- Lyricist - M. G. Hashmat

== Soundtrack ==
The music has been directed by Sapan Jagmohan, while the lyrics have been provided by M.G.Hashmat.

=== Track listing ===
All lyrics are written by M G Hashmat; all music is composed by Sapan–Jagmohan.

No.	Title	singer(s)	Length
1.	"Koi Mere Haathon Mein Mehandi Lagaa De"	Asha Bhosle	4:58
2.	"Mera Jivan Kuch Kaam Na Aaya"	Kishore Kumar	4:32
3.	"Yeh Suraj Yeh Chanda Yeh Taare"	Asha Bhosle	5:15
4.	"Tera Jogi Aaya, Tu Daal De Bhiksha Pyaar Ki"	Pankaj Mitra, Mohammed Rafi	5:24
