= Vidya Sinha =

Indian actress (1947–2019)

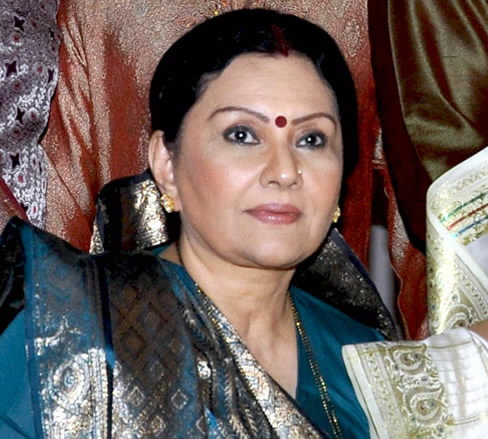
- Sinha in 2011
- Born: 15 November 1947; Bombay, Bombay Province, India
- Died: 15 August 2019 (aged 71); Mumbai, Maharashtra, India
- Occupation: Actress
- Years active: 1974–1986, 2000–2019
- Spouse(s): Venkateshwaran Iyer (m. 1968; died 1996) Netaji Bhimrao Salunkhe (m. 2001; div. 2009)
- Children: 1
- Father: Pratap A. Rana
- Relatives: Mohan Sinha (maternal grandfather)

Vidya Sinha (15 November 1947 – 15 August 2019) was an Indian actress who acted in Hindi films, most known for Rajnigandha (1974), Chhoti Si Baat (1975) and Pati Patni Aur Woh (1978). She started her career as a model and won the Miss Bombay title. Her first movie was Raja Kaka (1974) opposite Kiran Kumar. However, fame came to her through the low-budget break-away hit Rajnigandha (1974), directed by her mentor Basu Chatterjee. She acted in several films after which she took a hiatus. Returning to acting in the later part of her life, she acted in several TV serials and the Salman Khan movie Bodyguard (2011).

== Early life ==
Vidya Sinha was born on 15 November 1947 in Mumbai. Her father Pratap A. Rana (film name), also known as Rana Pratap Singh, was an Indian film producer, son-in-law of film director Mohan Sinha.

== Career ==
=== Movies ===
At the age of 18, she participated in a beauty contest where she was crowned Miss Bombay and she regarded one of the most beautiful and greatest actress of Indian cinema. After that she began modelling for several popular brands and was discovered by Basu Chatterjee. Her first movie was Raja Kaka (1974) opposite Kiran Kumar. However, fame came to her through the low-budget break-away hit Rajnigandha (1974), directed by Chatterjee. The movie, with none of the trappings of a typical blockbuster, was a major box office success. This was followed by another hit, Chhoti Si Baat (1975), paving the way for starring in mainstream productions with bigger budgets – Karm (1977) with Rajesh Khanna and Shabana Azmi, Mukti (1977) with Sanjeev Kumar and Shashi Kapoor, Inkaar (1977) with Vinod Khanna, Pati Patni Aur Woh (1978) with Sanjeev Kumar and Ranjeeta Kaur, Gulzar's Kitaab (1977), Saboot (1979), and Meera (1979). Vidya acted in 30 movies over a period of 10 years. In the Raj Sippy directed Josh (1981), she played her only negative role; that of a gangster stealing coins from beggars. The same year she played Vijeta Pandit's mother in the romantic film Love Story, starring opposite Rajendra Kumar and Danny.

After some years in Australia, Vidya returned to India and started acting in television serials. Salman Khan's Bodyguard (2011), her film after 25 years, was also her last film.

=== Television ===
Vidya Sinha acted in TV serials like Bahu Rani (2000), Hum Do Hain Na, Bhabhi and Kkavyanjali (2004). In 2011 she appeared in the NDTV Imagine serial Haar Jeet. She enacted the role of Asad's and Ayaan's grandmother, Badi Bi in the Zee TV show, Qubool Hai. She was also seen as Neha's grandmother in Itti Si Khushi., as Chandragupt's grandmother in Chandra Nandini and as Kulfi's grandmother in Kullfi Kumarr Bajewala.

== Filmography ==
Year	Film	Role(s)	Notes
1974	Rajnigandha	Deepa Kapoor	
1974	Raja Kaka	Sonu	
1974	Hawas	Vidya Kumar	
1976	Chhoti Si Baat	Prabha Narayan	
1976	Mera Jiwan	Sandhya	
1976	Sardar-E-Azam		Punjabi Film
1977	Mamta	Tripti Mathur	
1977	Jeevan Mukt		
1977	Karm	Asha Shastri/Sadhna	
1977	Mukti	Seema K. Sharma	
1977	Kitaab	Mrs. Komal Gupta	
1977	Inkaar	Geeta Chaudhary	
1977	Chalu Mera Naam	Dolly/Rani/Mrs. Shyamlam	
1978	Udeekan	Rajni	Special appearance
1978	Tyaag Patra		
1978	Sone Ka Dil Lohe Ke Haath	Parvati	
1978	Pati Patni Aur Woh	Sharda Chaddha	
1978	Safed Jhooth	Kamla Gulati	
1978	Tumhare Liye	Gauri	
1978	Muqaddar	Savitri	
1978	Atithee	Meena/Martha	
1978	Bahadur Jiska Naam		
1979	Jeena Yahan		Guest appearance
1979	Atmaram	Ranjit's wife	
1979	Magroor	Anju	
1979	Meera	Krishna Rathod	
1980	Saboot	Asha	
1980	Swayamvar	Shanti Bhargav	
1980	Pyaara Dushman	Munni 'Seema'	
1980	Bambai Ka Maharaja	Parvati Rajendra Singh	
1981	Plot No. 5	Anuja	
1981	Love Story	Suman Dogra	
1981	Nai Imarat	Chandra	Also Producer
1981	Josh		
1981	Seth Jagdusha		Gujarati Film
1982	Adhura Aadmi	Amjad Khan	
1982	Raakh Aur Chingari	Meena & Salu	
1982	Retina Ratan		Gujarati Film
1984	Dhokebaaz	Radha	
1984	Qaidi	Sita	
1986	Kirayadar	Mrs. Laxmi Abhyankar	
1986	Maa Ki Saugandh	Billo	
1986	Krishna-Krishna	Rani Rukmini	
1986	Jeeva	Thakurani	
1986	Bijli		Marathi Film
1987	Hiraasat		
1991	Bharat Bhagya Vidhata	Shabbir's mother	
2010	Malik Ek	Vishnu's Mother	
2011	Bodyguard	Mrs. Rana	Final film performance

== Television ==
Year	Serial	Role	Notes
1985	Sinhasan Battisi	–	Producer
2004–2005	Hum 2 Hain Na	Koel's grandmother	
2005	Kkavyanjali	Kkavya's paternal grandmother	
2006	Zaara	Dadi	
2011	Neem Neem Shahad Shahad	Hansmukh's wife	
2012	Haar Jeet	Sahil's grandmother	
2012 – 2014	Qubool Hai	Badi Bii	
2014–2015	Qubool Hai	Neha's Daadi	
2015	Zindagi Wins	Nurse Mariam	
2015–2016	Ishq Ka Rang Safed	Sushma Tripathi	
2016–2017	Chandra Nandini	Grand-Queen Sonarika of Magadha	
2018–2019	Kullfi Kumarr Bajewala	Dadi	

== Personal life ==
Sinha married her neighbour, a Tamil Brahmin named Venkateshwaran Iyer, in 1968. After retiring from her film career she adopted a daughter, Jhanvi, in 1989. The next few years were spent in taking care of Jhanvi and her ailing husband, who eventually died in 1996. Vidya then moved to Sydney, met the elderly Australian doctor, Netaji Bhimrao Salunke, online in 2001, and married him after a quick courtship, in a small temple wedding. On 9 January 2009, she filed a complaint with the police accusing Salunkhe of physical and mental torture. They were divorced soon afterwards, and after a protracted battle, she won her case against him for maintenance.

== Death ==
On 15 August 2019, Sinha died at a hospital in Mumbai of respiratory failure caused by heart and lung disease at the age of 71. She had been admitted to the hospital on 11 August for breathing problems and subsequently put on a ventilator.
