= Kitaab =

- Kitaab film poster
- Directed by: Gulzar
- Written by: Gulzar; Bhushan Banmali; Debabrata Sengupta
- Based on: Pathik by Samaresh Basu
- Produced by: Gulzar; Pranlal Mehta
- Starring: Master Raju; Master Tito; Uttam Kumar; Vidya Sinha; Dina Pathak
- Cinematography: M. Sampat
- Music by: R. D. Burman; Gulzar (lyrics)
- Release date: 1977
- Country: India
- Language: Hindi

Kitaab (English: The Book) is a 1977 Indian drama film written and directed by Gulzar. The film stars Uttam Kumar, Vidya Sinha, Shreeram Lagoo, Keshto Mukherjee and Asit Sen. The film was based on Bengali story Pathik by Samaresh Basu. The musical score is by R. D. Burman with lyrics by Gulzar.

== Plot ==
Babla (Master Raju) is a kid who lives in a village with his mother (Dina Pathak). His mother sends him to his sister's (Vidya Sinha) place (in a city) so that he can go to a good school. Initially, Babla likes both school as well as his sister's home very much and becomes a good friend with Pappu (Master Tito), his classmate. They roam around in streets, watch street magic shows and wish they could do such tricks, look inquisitively at how sweets are made, make fun of teacher, etc. They enjoy all these things thoroughly. But Babla gets reminded of the harsh reality of life when his sister and brother-in-law start scolding him for his disinterest in studies and complaints from the school regarding his so-called irresponsible behavior (like making fun of teachers, singing in the classroom, etc.). He gets to realize that nobody understands kids, their innocence, their view of life and he will have to grow up to enjoy life fully.

One day Babla decides that he will be better off living with his mother in the village. He runs off and gets on a train. Since he does not have a ticket, the ticket-master catches him and makes him get off at the next station. In the night he feels cold and looks around for shelter. He finds an old woman sleeping in a blanket and lies down beside her sharing the blanket. In the morning, finding the old woman still sleeping, he picks up a coin from her container and goes off to drink water. While drinking water he sees that lot of people have gathered around the old lady. He goes there and finds out that the lady he had been sleeping with was dead. He gets scared to his core and realizes that life is, in fact, not that simple for those who are poor. He puts back the coin he had taken and runs off to his mother's place. There he finds his mother, sister and brother-in-law worrying about him. They are overjoyed to see Babla back and Babla promises to everyone that he will study sincerely and never create trouble for anyone.

== Cast ==
- Raju Shrestha as Babla
- Uttam Kumar as Nikhil Gupta
- Vidya Sinha as Suman Gupta
- Indrani Mukherjee as Kusum
- Tito Khatri as Pappu
- Shreeram Lagoo as Baijuram
- Dina Pathak as Babla's Mother
- Keshto Mukherjee as Pandit Shankar Lal
- Om Shivpuri as Principal
- T.P Jain as English Teacher
- Ram Mohan as Ustad

== Soundtrack ==
1. "Dhanno Ki Aankhon Men Hai Raat Kaa Suramaa" - R. D. Burman
2. "Hari Din To Bitaa Shaam Hui Raat Paar Karaa De" - Rajkumari Dubey
3. "Mastarjee Kee Aa Gayee Chitthee" -Shivangi Kolhapure
4. "Mere Sath Chale Na Saya" - Sapan Chakravarty
