= Meera (1979 film) =

- Theatrical poster
- Directed by: Gulzar
- Written by: Gulzar
- Screenplay by: Gulzar
- Story by: Bhushan Banmali
- Produced by: Premji, J.N. Manchanda Rammilan Chaudhary
- Starring: Hema Malini; Vinod Khanna; Shreeram Lagoo; Shammi Kapoor; Dina Pathak; Vidya Sinha; Bharat Bhushan; Amjad Khan
- Cinematography: K Vaikunth
- Edited by: Waman Bhonsle; Gurudutt Shirali; Dilip Kotalgi
- Music by: Pandit Ravi Shankar
- Distributed by: Suchitra International
- Release date: 25 May 1979 (India)
- Running time: 155 minutes
- Country: India
- Language: Hindi

Meera is a 1979 Hindi language film by Gulzar. The film is based on the life of Meera, a Hindu saint-poet who renounced princely comforts in pursuit of her love for Lord Krishna.

The film did not perform well at the Indian box office, although it received critical acclaim.

== Plot ==
The story is set around 1480, in the time of King Akbar. Biramdev (Dr Shreeram Lagoo) is the king of Medta, a province in Rajasthan. He has two daughters, Meera (Hema Malini) and Krishna (Vidya Sinha) and a son, Jaimal (Dinesh Thakur). Meera is in deep emotional love with Lord Krishna, so much so that she considers Lord Krishna to be her husband. Akbar (Amjad Khan) is becoming stronger day by day and hence other small provinces are trying to join against him. Medta, in one such political agreement, decides to join hands with Raja Vikramajit (Shammi Kapoor). As a part of this agreement Krishna is bethrothed to Vikramajit's son, Rana Bhojraj (Vinod Khanna) but on her wedding day she commits suicide. Meera is married (against her wish) to Rana Bhojraj.

But even after getting married her love for Lord Krishna remains the same and she follows her own ideals and way of living which are not very acceptable to Bhojraj and his family. Many differences arise due to Meera being follower of Lord Krishna who believed in vegan food, forgiveness and humanity whereas Rana Bhojraj and his family being followers of Devi were non-vegetarian, warriors and aggressive. One thing leads to another and one day Meera is declared as an outcast and traitor, after she accepts gift from emperor Akbar, who failed to play a wife's duties towards her husband, a bride's duties towards her family, and a woman's duties towards society. She is jailed and a public trial is ordered to decide her fate. But Meera is still unshakable and her spirituality keeps her going. She is not even afraid of death. Finally she is given a death sentence and is ordered to drink a cup of venom in front of the public. The love between Meera devi and Lord Krishna is so unshakeable that even the venom does not affect her.

She walks out of the royal court after drinking the venom singing Lord Krishna's praises. The entire town follows her, completely absorbed in her kirtan (devotional song). She enters the Krishna temple and becomes one with Lord Krishna.

== Production ==
Film's costume designer Bhanu Athaiya used changing hues of Meera saris to show her spiritual evolution rather dissolving into Krishna. Starting with vibrant colours as a princess, she leave the palace in orange (bhagwa), gradually shifting to yellow, fawn and finally to much paler beige colour.

== Soundtrack ==
While the film's soundtrack was composed by Ravi Shankar, a notable point of contention arose regarding the playback singing. Hema Malini has stated that her "biggest regret" in her career was that Lata Mangeshkar declined to provide the vocals for the film's bhajans. Although Malini personally requested her participation, Mangeshkar refused because she had previously recorded the same Meera bhajans for an album composed by her brother, Hridaynath Mangeshkar, and had promised him she would not record them for another project. Consequently, the songs were eventually performed by Vani Jairam, who won the Filmfare Best Female Playback Award for her work in the film.

All lyrics are written by Meera; all music is composed by Pandit Ravi Shankar.

No.	Title	Singer(s)	Length
1.	"Aeri Main To Prem Deewani" (Raga Todi, with Bhatiyar)	Vani Jairam
2.	"Baala Main Bairaagan Hoongi"	Vani Jairam
3.	"Badal Dekh Dari"	Vani Jairam
4.	"Hari Om Tansen" (Alaap)	Dinkar Kaikini
5.	"Jaago Bansiwale"	Vani Jairam
6.	"Jo Tum Todo Piya"	Vani Jairam
7.	"Karna Fakiri Phir Kya Dilgiri"	Vani Jairam
8.	"Karuna Suno Shyam More" (Raga Purvi)	Vani Jairam
9.	"Main Sanware Ke Rang Rachi"	Vani Jairam
10.	"Mere To Giridhar Gopal" (1; Raga Khamaj)	Vani Jairam
11.	"Pyar Darshan Dijo Aaj"	Vani Jairam
12.	"Ranaji Main To Govind"	Vani Jairam
13.	"Shyam Maane Chaakar"	Vani Jairam

== Awards and nominations ==
- 1980 Filmfare Award for Best Female Playback Singer - Won - Vani Jairam for "Mere To Giridhar Gopal"
