= Jeeva (1986 film) =

1986 film

- Poster
- Directed by: Raj N. Sippy
- Screenplay by: Gulzar
- Story by: P. D. Mehra; Vinay Shukla (dialogues)
- Produced by: Romu N. Sippy
- Starring: Sanjay Dutt; Mandakini
- Cinematography: Anwar Siraj
- Music by: R. D. Burman
- Release date: 1986
- Country: India
- Language: Hindi

Jeeva is a 1986 Indian Hindi-language action thriller film starring Sanjay Dutt and Mandakini in lead roles. The film is directed by Raj N. Sippy and produced by his brother Romu N. Sippy under the production house Rupam Pictures. The film was a box-office hit. The soundtrack of the film contains the ever-popular song "Roz Roz Aankhon Tale" as well as "Chal Aaj Ke Din".

== Plot ==
The plot revolves around Jeevan Thakur (Sanjay Dutt) confronting the cunning money lender Lala (Pran) and his ally Inspector Dushant Singh (Anupam Kher), wanting revenge for killing his parents. Orphaned at a young age, Jeevan is raised in a gang of dacoits where he takes the name Jeeva. After the death of the leader of the gang, Jeeva clashes with Lakhan (Shakti Kapoor), another contender for the leadership, and fall in love with Nalini.

== Cast ==
- Sanjay Dutt as Jeevan Singh / Jeeva Thakur
- Mandakini as Nalini
- Anupam Kher as Inspector Dushyant Singh(Nalini's father)
- Amjad Khan as Sardar
- Shakti Kapoor as Lakhan
- Sachin as Gopal Singh
- Gulshan Grover
- Pran as Lala Lalchand
- Shreeram Lagoo as Thakur Singh
- Vidya Sinha as Thakurain Singh
- Beena Banerjee as Beena
- Satyendra Kapoor as Judge

== Soundtrack ==
Penned by Gulzar and composed by R. D. Burman, the film features the following songs.

All lyrics are written by Gulzar.

No.	Title	Singer(s)	Length
1.	"Roz Roz Aankhon Tale"	Amit Kumar, Asha Bhosle
2.	"Chal, Aaj Ke Din, Raat Ka Vaada Kar Le"	Suresh Wadkar, Asha Bhosle
3.	"Bas Ek Nazar Pe Jaan Ka"	Asha Bhosle
4.	"Aa Jagmagata Chand Hai"	Asha Bhosle
5.	"Dil Pukare, Jeeva Re Aa Re"	Asha Bhosle
