= Agar... If =

Agar ... If
- Directed by: Esmayeel Shroff
- Written by: Moin-ud-din
- Produced by: Mohan Rao
- Starring: Amol Palekar; Zarina Wahab; Kader Khan
- Cinematography: Russi Bilimoria
- Edited by: Raju
- Music by: Sonik Omi
- Production company: Shreekala Arts
- Distributed by: Soham Rockstar Entertainment
- Release date: 16 December 1977
- Running time: 134 minutes
- Country: India
- Language: Hindi

Agar ... If is a 1977 Bollywood crime thriller film directed by Esmayeel Shroff produced by Mohan Rao.

== Plot ==
Bombay-based Anil Agarwal lives a very wealthy lifestyle, mostly from wealth, estate, and business inherited from his grandfather, along with his wife, Anju, and a school-going son named Jimmy. One day while at the beach a stranger named Vijay Sohni, rescues Jimmy from drowning, refuses to accept any compensation, but is invited to live in the palatial house of the Agarwals indefinitely, which he accepts. Anil's garage owner friend, Daver, cautions him against Vijay, as he has been seen making advances to Daver's wife, Suman. Anil decides to pay close attention to Vijay, and does find him getting closer and closer to Anju. He decides to ask Vijay to leave, and even gives him some money, when Daver bursts in accusing Vijay of having an affair with Suman, an argument ensues, which regresses into fisticuffs, Anil hits Vijay on his head which leads to his death. Daver disposes of the body, and both decide not to tell anyone about Vijay's disappearance. Then a letter is received in Vijay's name from a man named Ashok Saxena, demanding that he repay his loan of one lakh rupees immediately. Anil travels to Poona, finds out where Ashok lives, and pays him the amount. Thereafter, Anil starts receiving phone calls from a man named Chaman who claims that he knows everything about Vijay's disappearance. As if things were not complicated enough, another male knocks on the Anil's door one day, identifies himself as Ashok Saxena. Anil now realizes that he cannot trust anyone, and feels that he has been dragged into a web of deceit, lies and deception, from where there is no way out.

== Cast ==
- Amol Palekar as Anil Agarwal
- Zarina Wahab as Anju Agarwal
- Kader Khan as Davar
- Vijayendra Ghatge as Vijay Soni
- Tun Tun as Champakali (Agarwal Housemaid)
- Jagdeep as School-teacher
- Roohi Berde as Suman Davar
- Brahm Bhardwaj as Mr. Agarwal (Anil's Father)
- Krishan Dhawan as Ashok Saxena / Bhandari
- Viju Khote as Fake Police Inspector
- Manmohan Krishna as Police Commissioner
- Shreeram Lagoo as Ashok Saxena
- Keshto Mukherjee as Chaman
- Raju Shrestha as Jimmy A. Agarwal
- Kumud Tripathi as Jamunadas
- Gulshan Bawra (special appearance) the man who tells day and time
- Maqsood as inspector in the graveyard

== Music ==
| Song | Singer |
|---|---|
| "Aa Lag Jaa Gale Lehraake" | Asha Bhosle, Mohammed Rafi |
| "Jeevan Path Pe, Ek Rath Ke Do Pahiye" | Asha Bhosle, K. J. Yesudas |
| "Mummy Mujhe Gudiya Jaisi Behna Chahiye" | Asha Bhosle, Sushma Shrestha |
