= Anwar Siraj =

Ethiopian footballer

Personal information
- Date of birth: 8 December 1978 (age 47)
- Place of birth: Ethiopia
- Position: Defender

Senior career*
Years	Team	Apps	(Gls)
1994–2000	EEPCO		
2000–2001	Oman Club		
2001–2002	EEPCO		
2002–2006	Saint-George SA		
2006–2008	Al-Saqr		
2008–2009	Al-Wehda SC (Aden)		

International career
	Ethiopia	67	(9)
- * Club domestic league appearances and goals as of 1 February 2007

Anwar Siraj (born 8 December 1978, in Ethiopia) is retired Ethiopian footballer.

Siraj was also a member of the Ethiopia national football team. He finished his career in 2009.
