= Raj N. Sippy =

Indian film director and producer

- Born: Raj Sippy; 6 March 1948 (age 78); Bombay, Bombay State, India
- Occupations: Director; Producer; Screenwriter
- Years active: 1978–2010

Raj N. Sippy (born 6 March 1948) also known as Raj Sippy, is an Indian film director and producer working on Bollywood films. He was very prominent in the 1980s, with successful films, like Inkaar, Satyamev Jayate and Mahaadev with Vinod Khanna, Satte Pe Satta with Amitabh Bachchan, then Boxer and Baazi with Mithun Chakraborty He directed Satyamev Jayate, the come back film of Vinod Khanna after his Osho stint.

He has also directed Akshay Kumar's debut film Saugandh and Sanjay Dutt - Jeetendra starrer Thanedaar.

Sippy directed the unsuccessful Jimmy, Mimoh Chakraborty's debut film.

== Filmography ==
- 2011 Hamilton Palace
- 2008 Jimmy
- 2004 ...Woh
- 1998 Kudrat
- 1998 2001
- 1997 Koi Kisise Kum Nahin
- 1997 Deyshat
- 1996 Laalchee
- 1995 Paandav
- 1995 Nishana
- 1994 Ikke Pe Ikka
- 1994 Amaanat
- 1993 Pardesi
- 1992 Mr. Bond
- 1991 Saugandh
- 1991 Qurbani Rang Layegi
- 1990 Thanedaar
- 1990 Kali Ganga
- 1989 Shehzaade
- 1989 Mahaadev
- 1987 Satyamev Jayate
- 1987 Loha
- 1986 Jeeva
- 1985 Sitamgar
- 1985 Shiva Ka Insaaf
- 1984 Andar Baahar
- 1984 Baazi
- 1984 Boxer
- 1983 Qayamat
- 1982 Satte Pe Satta
- 1981 Josh
- 1977 Inkaar
