= Damaad =

- Directed by: Rajat Rakshit
- Based on: Mouchak (Bengali)
- Produced by: Pari A V Mohan; Anand Bhosle
- Starring: Amol Palekar; Ranjeeta
- Music by: Hemant Bhosle
- Release date: 1978
- Country: India
- Language: Hindi

Damaad is a 1978 Bollywood comedy film directed by Rajat Rakshit. A remake of the 1974 Bengali film Mouchak. It features Amol Palekar, Ranjeeta, Shreeram Lagoo, Tarla Mehta, Preeti Ganguly, Pinchoo Kapoor, Dina Pathak and Jagdeep.

== Plot ==
Sharad belongs to a middle-class family and lives with his brother Shreeram Lagoo and sister-in-law Tarla Mehta in Bombay. Sharad gets a factory job in Malavli and accepts it though not interested. The bosses (Rodrigues and Choudhury) are initially rude to him, but soften and pamper him when they realize he is unmarried. Both of them are on the lookout for grooms for their daughters. Chaudhary invites Sharad home for lunch and introduces him to his daughter Leena who promptly falls in love with him. Rodrigues introduces Sharad to his three daughters as well.

Sharad is in love with his neighbour Renu. At the factory, his assistant Khote, wanting to help him get out of the trap set by the bosses, spreads a rumour that Sharad is not of good character. This, however, creates tensions between Renu and Sharad. Chaudhury starts believing that Khote is spreading the rumours to win over Sharad as his own son-in-law. After a series of funny incidents and fumbles, all tensions are finally resolved.

== Cast ==
- Amol Palekar as Sharad Mazgaonkar
- Ranjeeta Kaur as Renu
- Shreeram Lagoo as Shreedhar Mazgaonkar
- Tarla Mehta as Mrs. Mazgaonkar, Sharad's bhabhi
- Jagdeep as Baankey the mad man in Malavli
- Keshto Mukherjee as Tulsiram
- Preeti Ganguli as Leena
- Pinchoo Kapoor Mr. Chaudhary
- Dina Pathak Mrs. Chaudhary
- Datta Bhat Renu's father
- Sunder as Dr.Chatterjee
- Marutirao Parab as Mr. Rodrigues
- C S Dubey as Sundarji Pandit
- Ashok Saraf as Mr. Khote
- Master Sakka as Sonu
- Mushtaq Merchant as Charan
- Harbans Darshan M. Arora as neighbor who throws water on Charan

== Soundtrack ==
Song	Singer
"Zindagi Ke Safar Mein Na Jaane Kab Kaise" (Solo)	Mohammed Rafi
"Zindagi Ke Safar Mein Na Jaane Kab Kaise" (Duet)	Asha Bhosle, Mohammed Rafi
"Mujhe Tadpaati Rahi, Roz Sataati Rahi"	Asha Bhosle, Mohammed Rafi
"Jaage Jaage Nainon Mein Andekhe Sapne"	Asha Bhosle
"Naacho Gaao Maze Udaao, Dil Se Dil Ko Zara Takraao"	Asha Bhosle

== Trivia ==
- Debut of Ashok Saraf in Hindi movies.
