= Plot No. 5 =

- Directed by: Yogesh Saxena
- Produced by: Jerooant Yogesh
- Starring: Uttam Kumar
- Music by: Salil Choudhury
- Release date: 1981
- Country: India
- Language: Hindi

Plot No. 5 is a 1981 Indian Hindi-language psychological action thriller film directed by Yogesh Saxena and produced by Jerooant Yogesh. This film was released on 23 January 1981 under the banner of Visual Productions. It was released after the death of Uttam Kumar, one of the key actors of the film.

== Plot ==
The plot revolves around a series of mysterious murders where the victims are young, ambitious girls. Police officer Khan discovers that all the murders are committed near the house named Plot No. 5. Two brothers, Ajay and Sanjay Mehra, live there with a servant. Sanjay uses a wheelchair. Mr Verma, a friend of the Mehra brothers and a family doctor, often comes there. The police suspect all of them. Finally, it is revealed that Sanjay had killed all those girls who had taken pity on his disability. Ajay had tried to take his brother's crime on himself due to his guilt emerging from the fact that he had unintentionally made his brother disabled.

== Cast ==
- Uttam Kumar as Sanjay Mehra
- Amol Palekar as Ajay Mehra
- Pradeep Kumar as Doctor
- Vidya Sinha as Anuja
- Vikas Anand as Adv Mohan Bhardwaj
- Sarika as Sarita
- Amjad Khan as Inspector Khan
- Shreeram Lagoo as Verma
- Viju Khote as Sub-Inspector Kote
- Benjamin Gilani as Rahul Verma
- Komilla Wirk as Nikki
- Maruti Rao as Cristo

== Music ==
Salil Choudhury was the film's music director. This is the only film where Chowdhury scored the background music and a disco song, Chic Chic Chica Chica.
