= Sitamgar =

Sitamgar (1985)
- Poster
- Directed by: Raj N. Sippy
- Written by: Humayun Mirza
- Starring: Dharmendra; Rishi Kapoor; Parveen Babi; Poonam Dhillon
- Music by: R. D. Burman
- Release date: 21 June 1985
- Country: India
- Language: Hindi

Sitamgar is a 1985 Bollywood action film directed by Raj N. Sippy starring Dharmendra, Rishi Kapoor, Parveen Babi and Poonam Dhillon in lead roles.

== Cast ==
- Dharmendra as Sonu / Shankar
- Rishi Kapoor as Jai
- Parveen Babi as Sheela
- Poonam Dhillon as Nisha
- Prem Chopra as Jeevan
- Dr. Shreeram Lagoo as Nath
- Narendra Nath as Kundan
- Sonia Sahni as Nisha's mother
- Sudhir as Inspector Jimmy
- Jagdish Raj

== Soundtrack ==
All songs were written by Majrooh Sultanpuri.

#	Song	Singer
1	"Mausam Pyar Ka Rang Badalta Rahe"	Kishore Kumar, Asha Bhosle
2	"Meri Tarah Allah Kare, Tera Kisi Pe Aaye Dil"	Kishore Kumar, Asha Bhosle
3	"Tum Dilwalon Ke Aage Lakhon Deewane Aaye"	Kishore Kumar, Lata Mangeshkar
4	"Chand Roz Aur Meri Jaan, Chand Roz"	Kishore Kumar
5	"Pyar Jab Na Diya Zindagi Ne Kabhi"	Kishore Kumar
6	"Hum Kitne Nadaan The Yaaron"	Kishore Kumar
