= Magroor (1979 film) =

- Poster
- Directed by: Brij
- Produced by: R.C. Kumar
- Starring: Shatrughan Sinha; Vidya Sinha
- Music by: Laxmikant–Pyarelal
- Production company: Century Films
- Release date: 20 April 1979
- Country: India
- Language: Hindi

Magroor is a 1979 Hindi-language film directed by Brij. It stars Shatrughan Sinha and Vidya Sinha.

== Cast ==
- Shatrughan Sinha ... Ranjit Sinha / Raju
- Vidya Sinha ... Anju
- Premnath ... Mama
- Shreeram Lagoo ... Chacha
- Deven Verma ... Lallu
- Helen ... Rukhsana
- Jagdish Raj ... Police Officer
- Nadira ... Mrs. Disa
- Paintal ... Rakesh (Anju's Brother)

== Soundtrack ==
Lyrics: Anand Bakshi; Music Director: Laxmikant Kudalkar Pyarelal

Song	Singer
"Hum Mohabbat Mein Jaane Kya Kar Jaate"	Kishore Kumar, Suman Kalyanpur
"Haseen Raat Mein, Allah Kasam, Mulaqat Mein"	Asha Bhosle, Mohammed Rafi
"Rukhsana Rukhsana, Main Tera Deewana"	Asha Bhosle, Manna Dey
"Shyam Tumhara Main Naam Pukaroon"	Mahendra Kapoor, Anuradha Paudwal
