= Chhoti Si Baat =

1976 film

- Film Poster
- Directed by: Basu Chatterjee
- Written by: Sharad Joshi; Basu Chatterjee (dialogue)
- Screenplay by: Basu Chatterjee
- Based on: School for Scoundrels by Robert Hamer
- Produced by: B. R. Chopra
- Starring: Amol Palekar; Vidya Sinha; Ashok Kumar; Asrani
- Cinematography: K. K. Mahajan
- Edited by: V N Mayekar
- Music by: Salil Chowdhury
- Production company: B. R. Films
- Distributed by: B. R. Films
- Release date: 9 January 1976
- Country: India
- Language: Hindi

Chhoti Si Baat (translation: A Small Matter) is a 1976 Indian Hindi-language romantic comedy film directed by Basu Chatterjee. The film stars Amol Palekar, Vidya Sinha, Ashok Kumar and Asrani, and was a financial success. and also earned six Filmfare nominations and a Filmfare Award for Best Screenplay for Basu Chatterjee. The film is a remake of the 1960 British film School for Scoundrels.

As with other Basu Chatterjee films, popular Bollywood actors briefly appear as themselves. Dharmendra and Hema Malini (whose mother Jaya Chakravarthy helped produce the film) appear for the song Janneman Janneman, while Amitabh Bachchan plays himself in another scene. He is dressed in costume from Zameer, the film poster for which is visible at some of the bus stop scenes. B.R. Chopra is the producer for both Zameer and Chhoti Si Baat.

== Plot ==
Arun Pradeep (Amol Palekar) is a timid supervisor at a Bombay accounting firm who is routinely taken advantage of by his colleagues and faultlessly reprimanded by his superiors. One morning at a bus stop, he sees Prabha Narayan (Vidya Sinha), an independent young woman who works at a private firm on his transit route, and becomes infatuated with her. He trails her from a distance on her daily commute, being too anxious to speak to her and believing he has gone unnoticed. Prabha is, however, fully aware of his interest and waits for him to approach her.

Later, Nagesh Shastri (Asrani), a self-assured colleague of Prabha's, begins courting her by offering her rides on his scooter and dominating her attention. Arun watches from the sidelines. He is also duped into purchasing a defective motorcycle in an attempt to match Nagesh. His subsequent efforts to gain an advantage through astrology, tarot cards, and various fraudulent godmen advices prove equally futile.

Arun travels to Khandala and seeks the help of Colonel Julius Nagendranath Wilfred Singh (Ashok Kumar), a self-appointed confidence coach who helps lovelorn young men. Colonel Singh devises a programme of instruction designed to help build Arun's self-assurance. Arun returns to Bombay a transformed man and sets about winning Prabha's affections in earnest.

== Cast ==
- Amol Palekar as Arun Pradeep
- Vidya Sinha as Prabha Narayan
- Ashok Kumar as Colonel (retd.) Julius Nagendranath Wilfred Singh
- Asrani as Nagesh Shastri
- Nandita Thakur as Deepa
- R. S. Chopra as Secretary of Col. J. N. W. Singh
- Rajendra Nath as Maunibaba
- C. S. Dubey as Gurnaam Dubey (garage owner)
- Komila Virk as Colonel Singh's assistant
- Manmohan as self (for "Jaaneman Jaaneman")
- Dharmendra as self (for "Jaaneman Jaaneman")
- Hema Malini as self (for "Jaaneman Jaaneman")
- Amitabh Bachchan as self

== Soundtrack ==
All lyrics are written by Yogesh; all music is composed by Salil Chowdhury.

No.	Title	Singer(s)	Length
1.	"Jaaneman Jaaneman Tere Do Nayan"	K. J. Yesudas, Asha Bhosle	5:11
2.	"Na Jaane Kyon Hota Hai Yeh Zindagi Ke Saath"	Lata Mangeshkar	3:12
3.	"Yeh Din Kyaa Aaye"	Mukesh	3:05

== Awards and nominations ==
Year	Award	Category	Recipient(s)	Result	Ref.
1977	Filmfare Awards	Best Film	B. R. Chopra	Nominated	
1977	Filmfare Awards	Best Director	Basu Chatterjee	Nominated	
1977	Filmfare Awards	Best Screenplay	Basu Chatterjee	Won	
1977	Filmfare Awards	Best Actor	Amol Palekar	Nominated	
1977	Filmfare Awards	Best Supporting Actor	Ashok Kumar	Nominated	
1977	Filmfare Awards	Best Performance in a Comic Role	Asrani	Nominated	
