= Swayamvar (1980 film) =

Swayamvar is a 1980 Indian Hindi-language romantic comedy-drama film directed by P. Sambasiva Rao and produced by B. Nagi Reddy under Vijaya Productions. The film stars Sanjeev Kumar, Shashi Kapoor, Moushumi Chatterjee and Vidya Sinha, with Nadira, Madan Puri, Ranjeet and Asrani in supporting roles. Its music was composed by Rajesh Roshan, with lyrics by Gulzar. The film centres on two brothers who devise different plans to marry two sisters, one of whom is mistreated by her stepmother.

== Plot ==
Durga Devi, a wealthy widow, favours her daughter Roopa while treating her stepdaughter Shanti as a servant. Durga Devi's brother, Makhanlal, attempts to arrange Roopa's marriage to his son Chander, who is imprisoned, and sabotages other proposals.

Ratanlal, a businessman who had prospered with the help of Durga Devi's late husband, learns about the family's circumstances. Determined to help the two women, he asks his sons, Ram and Laxman, to marry Shanti and Roopa.

Ram enters Durga Devi's household disguised as a servant and gradually wins Shanti's affection. Meanwhile, Laxman poses as the wealthy son of a maharaja and courts Roopa with assistance from his friend Jagdish and Jagdish's wife, Leela. Their schemes frustrate Makhanlal's plans.

After the marriages, Laxman pretends to be poor and adopts the behaviour of a drunken, irresponsible husband to test Roopa's love for him. His conduct creates conflict within the household. Meanwhile, Chander is released from prison, threatening the sisters' security and setting the stage for the final confrontation.

== Cast ==
- Sanjeev Kumar as Ram
- Shashi Kapoor as Laxman
- Moushumi Chatterjee as Roopa Bhargav
- Vidya Sinha as Shanti Bhargav
- Nadira as Durga Devi Bhargav
- Madan Puri as Makhanlal
- Ranjeet as Chander
- Asrani as Jagdish
- Shashikala as Jwala
- Shreeram Lagoo as Ratanlal
- Nana Palsikar as Purohit Shankarprasad
- Meena T. as Leela
- Birbal as Lala Udharchand

== Production ==
Swayamvar was directed by P. Sambasiva Rao, an Indian filmmaker known for directing films in multiple Indian languages. B. Nagi Reddy served as producer. The film was produced under the Vijaya Productions banner.

== Soundtrack ==
The soundtrack was composed by Rajesh Roshan, with lyrics by Gulzar. Songs highlighted in contemporary retrospective discussion of the film include "Mujhe Chhoo Rahi Hain" and "Ek Mahal Ma Chham Chham".

| Song | Singer | Music | Lyrics |
|---|---|---|---|
| Nari Kuch Aisan | Kishore Kumar | Rajesh Roshan | Gulzar |
| Mujhe Chu Rahi Hain Teri Garam Sansen | Mohammed Rafi & Lata Mangeshkar | Rajesh Roshan | Gulzar |
| Ek Mahal Ma Chum Chum Karti | Mohammed Rafi & Kishore Kumar | Rajesh Roshan | Gulzar |
| Aap Apne Nashe Mein Jeete Hai | Kishore Kumar | Rajesh Roshan | Gulzar |

== Release ==
Swayamvar was released in India in 1980. IMDb lists its Indian release date as 28 April 1980, although other film listings give different dates.

== Reception ==
In a retrospective review published in September 2007, MemsaabStory described the film as a fairy-tale-like comedy and praised the performances of Sanjeev Kumar and Shashi Kapoor. The review also commended Nadira's portrayal of Durga Devi, the supporting performances of Vidya Sinha and Moushumi Chatterjee, and Rajesh Roshan's music.
