= Inkaar (1977 film) =

1977 Indian film by Raj N. Sippy

- Directed by: Raj N. Sippy
- Written by: Jyoti Swaroop (screenplay); Sagar Sarhadi (dialogue)
- Produced by: Romu N. Sippy
- Starring: Vinod Khanna; Vidya Sinha; Shreeram Lagoo; Amjad Khan
- Cinematography: Anwar Siraj
- Edited by: Waman Bhonsle, Gurudutt Shirali
- Music by: Rajesh Roshan
- Distributed by: Uttam Chitra
- Release date: 11 November 1977
- Running time: 132 minutes
- Country: India
- Language: Hindi

Inkaar (lit. 'Refusal') is a 1977 Indian Hindi-language thriller film, produced by Romu N. Sippy and directed by Raj N. Sippy. the film stars Vinod Khanna, Vidya Sinha, Amjad Khan and Shreeram Lagoo. The music is by Rajesh Roshan. It won the National Film Award for Best Editing.

This is a remake of the Japanese film High and Low (1963), directed by Akira Kurosawa, which itself was based on the American novel King's Ransom (1959) by Ed McBain.

== Plot ==
Haridas Choudhry lives a wealthy lifestyle in Mumbai, India, along with his wife, Sonu, son, Guddu, and sister, Geeta. He had started his career as a lowly cobbler on a corner of a busy street, but is now the owner of a shoe company. His associates want him to make shoes that wear out soon, but he refuses to do so, and would like to buy out National Shoes for 20 Lakh Rupees. He withdraws the money, but before he could undertake the transaction, Guddu gets kidnapped, and the demand from his abductors is for 20 Lakhs. Much to his relief he finds out that his servant's son, Bansi, has been mistakenly abducted in place of his son. Nevertheless, he decides to pay the ransom, this time with the help of Inspector Amarnath Gill, his sister's estranged boyfriend, who he had turned down as he was not wealthy enough. The money is turned over to the kidnappers, two associates, Manmohan and Preeti, are arrested, Bansi is found and returned to his dad. But the money and the real abductor, Raj Singh, is still at large - and as long as he remains at large none of them can really be safe for he has a grudge to settle against Haridas, and the missing 20 Lakhs may result in the bankruptcy of Haridas' company, they may have to forfeit their family home, and Haridas may well face a jail sentence for embezzling this amount for personal gain. But Inspector catches the thief and returns the money in the end.

== Cast ==
- Vinod Khanna - CID Officer Amarnath "Amar" Gill
- Vidya Sinha - Geeta Chaudhry
- Shreeram Lagoo - Haridas Chaudhry
- Amjad Khan - Raj Singh 'Kidnapper'
- Sadhu Meher - Sitaram 'Servant'
- M.Rajan - Police Officer Yadav
- Lily Chakravarty - Sonu H. Chaudhry
- Bharat Kapoor - Manmohan
- Sheetal - Preeti
- Ranjita Thakur - Hema Gill
- Keshto Mukherjee - Drunk fishing at the china creek
- Rakesh Roshan - Himself in a Song "Dil ki Kali Yuhi Sada" (Special Appearance)
- Raju Shrestha - Bansi
- Kamaldeep - Shoe Company Director
- Harish Magon - Anil Sharma
- Gurbachan Singh - Bar Room Brawler
- Helen - Dancer at Bar in song "O Mungala"
- Brahm Bharadwaj as Judge

== Soundtrack ==
The music for this film was composed by Rajesh Roshan. The song "O Mungada" was recreated in Total Dhamaal which was picturised on Sonakshi Sinha

| Song | Singer |
|---|---|
| "Chhodo Yeh Nigahon Ka Ishaara" | Kishore Kumar, Asha Bhosle |
| "Dil Ki Kali Yun Hi Sada Khilti" (Happy) | Mohammed Rafi |
| "Dil Ki Kali Yun Hi Sada Khilti" (Sad) | Mohammed Rafi |
| "O Mungala Mungala"(marathi word for big ant) | Usha Mangeshkar |

== See also ==
- Remakes of films by Akira Kurosawa
