= Dhyaas Parva =

2001 film by Amol Palekar

- Directed by: Amol Palekar
- Written by: Chitra Palekar
- Based on: Raghunath Dhondo Karve
- Produced by: Amol Palekar
- Starring: Kishor Kadam; Seema Biswas; Atul Kulkarni; Sachin Khedekar; Varsha Usgaokar
- Cinematography: Debu Deodhar
- Edited by: Waman Bhonsle
- Music by: Anjan Biswas
- Release date: 2001
- Running time: 135 minutes
- Country: India
- Language: Marathi

Dhyaas Parva (transl. An Era of Yearning) is a 2001 Indian Marathi-language biographical drama film about Raghunath Dhondo Karve, written by Chitra Palekar and directed by Amol Palekar. The film stars Kishor Kadam in the lead role, with Seema Biswas, Atul Kulkarni, Sachin Khedekar, and Varsha Usgaonkar. The film won the National Film Award for Best Film on Family Welfare and six state awards.

== Cast ==
- Kishor Kadam as Raghunath Dhondo Karve
- Seema Biswas as Malati Karve
- Atul Kulkarni as Gopal Krishna Gokhale
- Sachin Khedekar as R. P. Paranjpye
- Varsha Usgaonkar as Shakuntala Paranjpye
- Sanjay Mone as B. R. Ambedkar
- Nishith Dadhich as Congress Activist
- Mohan Gokhale
- Shreeram Lagoo
- Samdeep Mehta
- Minal Paranjape
- Sanjay Pawar
