= Amol Palekar =

Indian actor and director (born 1944)

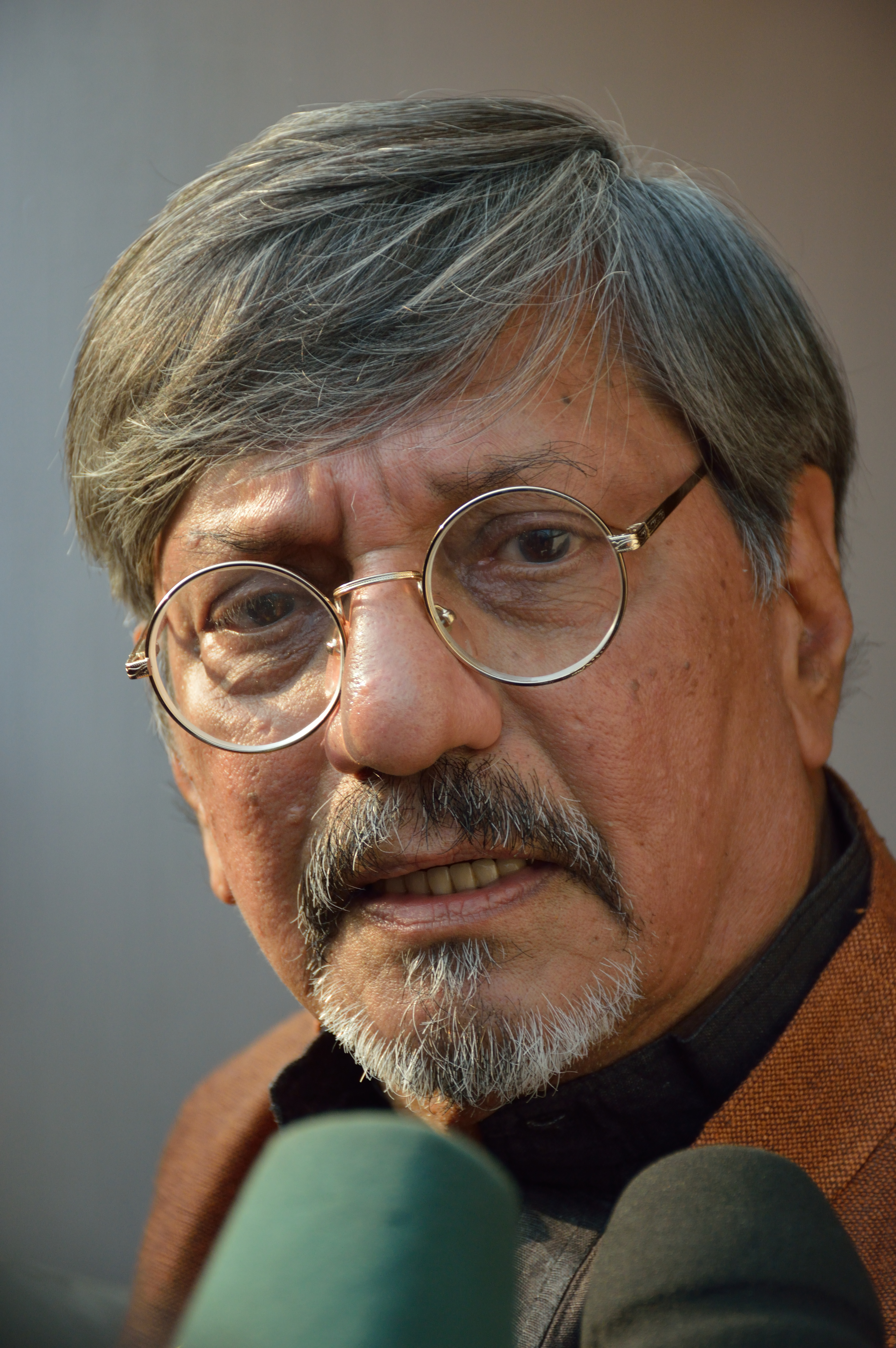
- Palekar in 2016
- Born: 24 November 1944 (age 81); Bombay, Bombay Province, British India
- Occupations: Actor; director; producer
- Years active: 1969–present
- Spouses: Chitra Palekar (m. 1969; div. 2001) Sandhya Gokhale (m. 2001)
- Parents: Kamalakar Palekar (father); Suhasini Palekar (mother)
- Awards: Filmfare Best Actor Award: 1979: Gol Maal
- Website: amolpalekar.com

Signature
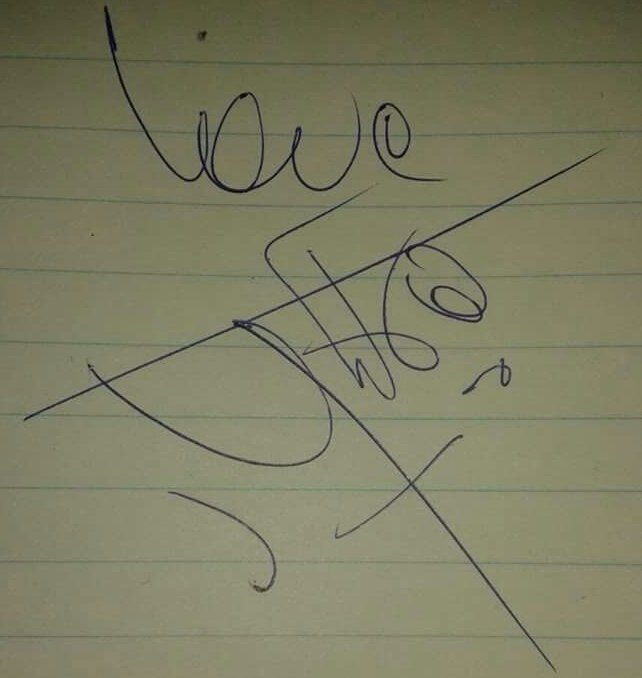

Amol Palekar (born 24 November 1944) is an Indian actor, director, and producer of Hindi and Marathi cinema. He is also a painter and an author. Palekar was part of the faction in Hindi cinema that popularised 'middle cinema'. His most popular works include Chhoti Si Baat (1975), Chitchor (1976), Bhumika (1977), Baaton Baaton Mein (1979), and Gol Maal (1979).

== Early life and education ==
Palekar was born to Kamlakara and Suhasini Palekar in a Marathi middle-class family in Mumbai. He has three sisters named Neelon, Rekha, and Unnati. His father worked in the General Post Office and his mother worked in a private company. Palekar studied fine arts at the Sir J. J. School of Art, Mumbai, and commenced his artistic career as a painter. As a painter, he has had seven solo exhibitions and participated in many group shows.

== Acting career ==
Although he trained in fine arts, Palekar is better known as a stage and film actor. He has been active in the avant-garde theatre in India in Marathi and Hindi theatre as an actor, director, and producer since 1967. His contribution to the modern Indian theatre is often overshadowed by his popularity as a lead actor in Hindi films.

As a film actor, he was most prominent in the 1970s. His image as a "boy next door" contrasted with the larger-than-life heroes prevalent at that time in Indian cinema. He received three Filmfare Awards and six Maharashtra State Film Awards as Best Actor for his works. His performances in regional language films in Marathi, Bengali, Malayalam, and Kannada fetched him critical acclaim. He decided not to act after 1986 in order to concentrate on filmmaking.

As a director, he is known for the sensitive portrayal of women, selection of classic stories from Indian literature, and perceptive handling of progressive issues. He has directed several television serials on national network such as Kachchi Dhoop, Mrignayani, Naquab, Paool Khuna and Krishna Kali.

=== Theatre career ===
Palekar began in Marathi experimental theatre with Satyadev Dubey. He later started his own group, Aniket, in 1972. As a theatre actor, he was part of popular plays like Shantata! Court Chalu Aahe, Hayavadana, and Adhe Adhure. Before taking a break, his last performance on stage was at the National Centre for the Performing Arts in 1994. On account of the year he turned 75, he returned to theatre after a gap of 25 years with the suspenseful play, Kusur (The Mistake). This play was directed by him and he also played the lead role.

=== Movie career ===
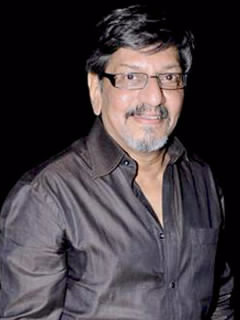
Palekar in 2011

Palekar made his debut in 1971 with the Marathi film Shantata! Court Chalu Aahe directed by Satyadev Dubey, which started the New Cinema Movement in Marathi. In 1974, he was cast as an actor by director Basu Chatterjee in Rajnigandha, and in the surprise low-budget hit, Chhoti Si Baat. This led to him getting more roles in "middle-class" comedies, mostly alternative. These were mostly directed by Chatterjee or Hrishikesh Mukherjee and included films such as Gol Maal and Naram Garam. He won the Filmfare Best Actor Award for Gol Maal.

He is noted for his image of the "middle-class everyman" who struggles to get a job in Gol Maal, his own flat in Gharonda, and a partner Chhoti Si Baat.

In 1979, he was paired with a sixteen-year-old Sridevi in Solva Saawan, which was her debut Hindi movie as the female lead. Amol played the role of an intellectually disabled man, a character played by Kamal Haasan in the original Tamil movie.

In 1982, he played the role of Ravi in the Malayalam movie Olangal. He turned to directing with the Marathi film Aakriet. He forayed into Hindi filmmaking with movies such as Thodasa Roomani Ho Jaayen and Paheli. Thodasa Roomani Ho Jaayen has become a part of management courses and study pertaining to human behaviour. Paheli was India's official entry for Best Foreign Film at the 2006 Oscars. The movie, however, did not make it to the final nominations.

Palekar has also produced produced his first film Ankahee in 1985. He has produced several independent films since.

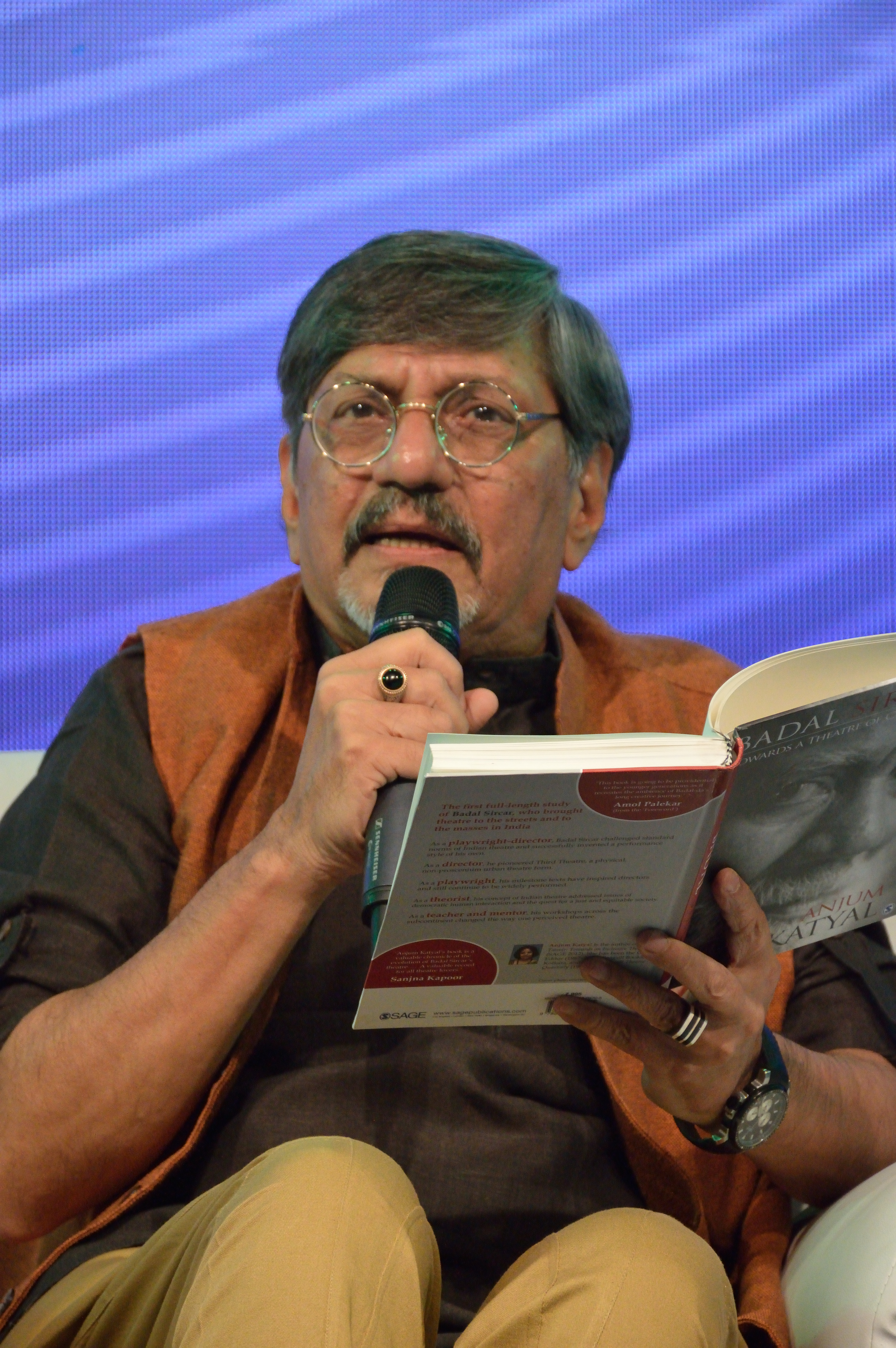
Palekar in 2016

He has also given his voice to an HIV/AIDS education animated software tutorial created by the nonprofit organization TeachAids.

== Personal life ==
Palekar regards himself as an agnostic atheist. He married Sandhya Gokhale after his divorce from his first wife, Chitra Palekar.

In February 2022, Palekar was hospitalized in Pune for COVID-19 related complications. At the age of 80, Palekar released his autobiography, originally written in Marathi and titled Aiwaz; its English version was titled Viewfinder.

== Controversies ==
Palekar was a part of the 1981 film Agni Pareeksha. Even after the production of the film was completed, Palekar had not received his dues. He brought up this issue with the film's producer B. R. Chopra. The argument turned into an ugly spat where Chopra threatened Palekar to "kick him out of the industry". Palekar sued Chopra over unfulfilled dues, and won the case.

In 2015, Palekar was appointed as the chairperson for the jury committee to pick India's official entry to the Oscars. He had stated that he faced external pressure to select certain films which he denies obliging to. That year, the Marathi film Court was submitted as India's official entry to the Academy Awards.

== Filmography ==
=== As an actor ===
Year	Film	Role	Notes
1969	Bajiraocha Beta	Bajirao's son	Marathi film
1971	Shantata! Court Chalu Aahe	G. M. Ponkshe	Marathi film
1974	Rajnigandha	Sanjay	
1975	Jeevana Jyoti	Sanjay	Telugu film
1976	Chhoti Si Baat	Arun Pradeep	Nominated: Filmfare Award for Best Actor
1976	Chitchor	Vinod	
1977	Gharaonda	Sudip	
1977	Bhumika	Keshav Dalvi	Won: Filmfare Special Performance Award
1977	Agar... If	Anil Aggarwal	
1977	Taxi Taxie	Dev/Hero	
1977	Tuch Maazi Raani		Marathi film
1977	Kanneshwara Rama	Chenneera	Kannada film
1978	Damaad	Sharad Mazgaonkar	
1978	Safed Jhoot	Amol 'Ramu' Palekar	
1979	Baaton Baaton Mein	Tony Braganza	
1979	Gol Maal	Ram Prasad Sharma / Lakshman Prasad Sharma (Lucky)	Won: Filmfare Award for Best Actor
1979	Do Ladke Dono Kadke	Hari	
1979	Meri Biwi Ki Shaadi	Bhagwant Kumar Bartendu "Bhagu"	
1979	Solva Sawan	Mehna's cousin	
1979	Bin Baap Ka Beta		
1979	Mother		Marathi film
1979	Jeena Yahan	Dinesh	
1980	Aanchal	Kishan Lal	
1980	Apne Paraye	Chandranath	
1981	Naram Garam	Ram Eshwar Prasad	
1981	Sameera		
1981	Akriet	Mukutrao Shinde	Marathi film won: Filmfare Award for Best Actor – Marathi
1981	Kalankini		Bengali film
1981	Agni Pareeksha	Alok Choudhary / Ramesh Khanna	
1981	Chehre Pe Chehra	Peter	
1981	Plot No. 5	Ajay	
1982	Jeevan Dhaara	Anand Bhatnagar	
1982	Olangal	Ravi Chattan	Malayalam film
1982	Ramnagari		
1982	Spandan		
1982	Shriman Shrimati	Madhu Gupta	
1983	Rang Birangi	Ajay Sharma	
1983	Ashray	Amit Verma	
1983	Pyaasi Aankhen		
1983	Chena Achena		Bengali film
1984	Tarang	Rahul	
1984	Aadmi Aur Aurat	Tapan Sinha	TV movie
1984	Prarthana		
1984	Sringara Masa		Kannada film
1984	Mr. X	Amar	Voice dubbed by other artist
1985	Khamosh	Amol Palekar	
1985	Jhoothi	Inspector Kamal Nath	
1985	Ankahee	Devkinandan Chaturvedi 'Nandu'	
1985	Abasheshe		Bengali film
1986	Baat Ban Jaye	Yeshwant Rao Bhonsle	
1994	Teesra Kaun?	C. K. Kadam	
2001	Aks	The Defence Minister	
2009	Samaantar	Keshav Vaze	Marathi film
2021	200 – Halla Ho	Justice Vitthal Daangle	ZEE5 film
2023	Gulmohar	Sudhakar Batra	Disney+Hotstarfilm
2026	Reporting Live	Shiva Kaka	

=== As a director ===
- Aakreit (Unimaginable in Marathi) – 1981
- Ankahee (Unspoken) – 1985
- Thodasa Rumani Ho Jaye – 1990
- Bangarwadi – 1995
- Daayraa (The Square Circle) – 1996
- Anahat (Forever)
- Kairee (Raw mango) – 2001
- Dhyaas Parva (Kal Kaa Aadmi in Hindi) – 2001 (based on Raghunath Karve's life, won the National Award for Best Film on Family Welfare)
- Paheli (Riddle) – 2005 (India's official entry to the 78th Academy Awards for Best Foreign Language Film)
- Quest (English) – 2006 (won the National Film Award for Best Feature Film in English)
- Dumkata (2007)
- Samaantar (Marathi) – 2009
- ...And Once Again – 2010
- Dhoosar (Marathi) – 2011 (won the Maharashtra State Film Award)

=== Feature films in other regional languages ===
- Mother (Bengali) (with Sharmila Tagore & Dipankar Dey)
- Kalankini (Bengali) (with Mamata Shankar – directed by Dhiren Ganguly)
- Chena Achena (Bengali) (with Tanuja & Soumitra Chatterjee)
- Kanneshwara Rama (Kannada) (with Anant Nag & Shabana Azmi – directed by M.S. Sathyu)
- Paper Boats (Kannada & English) (with Deepa – directed by Pattabhirama Reddy)
- Olangal (Malayalam) (with Poornima Jayaram & Ambika – directed by Balu Mahendra)

=== TV serials ===
- Kachchi Dhoop – 1987
- Naqab – 1988
- Paoolkhuna – 1993
- Mrignayanee – 1991
- Kareena Kareena – 2004
- AA Bail Mujhe Maar – 1987
- Ek Nayi Ummeed-Roshni – 2015

=== Web series ===
Year	Title	Role	Notes
2023	Farzi	Madhav (Nanu)	
TBA	Gormint †	TBA	

== Awards ==
Award	Film	Year	Status
National Film Awards
Best Feature Film in Marathi	Bangarwadi	1995	Won
Special Jury Award (Feature Film)	Daayraa	1996	Won
Best Film on Other Social Issues	Kairee	1999	Won
Best Film on Family Welfare	Dhyaas Parva	2000	Won
Best Feature Film in English	Quest	2006	Won
Filmfare Awards
Best Actor	Chhoti Si Baat	1977	Nominated
Best Actor	Gol Maal	1980	Won
Filmfare Marathi Awards
Best Actor	Akriet	1981	Won
