= Agni Pareeksha (1981 film) =

- Directed by: Kamal Majumdar
- Produced by: B. R. Chopra
- Starring: Amol Palekar; Parikshit Sahni; Rameshwari
- Music by: Salil Choudhury
- Production company: B. R. Films
- Distributed by: B. R. Films
- Release date: 21 March 1981
- Country: India
- Language: Hindi

Agni Pareeksha (transl. Trial by fire) is a 1981 Bollywood crime film produced by B. R. Chopra and directed by Kamal Majumdar.

== Cast ==
- Amol Palekar as Alok Chaudhary / Ramesh Khanna
- Parikshit Sahni as Siddharth Sharma
- Rameshwari as Meeta
- Veena as Karuna Chaudhary
- Utpal Dutt as Ex-Manager Gupta
- Iftekhar as Psychiatrist Dr Shyam Sen
- Shreeram Lagoo as Advocate Anupam
- S. N. Banerjee as Jailor Kapoor
- Jankidas as Ramu
- Nana Palsikar as Dinanath Sharma
- Jagdish Raj as Police Inspector Sharma
- Dinesh Singh as Dilip Thakur (Karuna's Brother)

== Soundtrack ==
Lyrics: Yogesh

Song	Singer
"Aaj Koi Nahin Apna"	Lata Mangeshkar
"O Re Man Gungun Gungun"	Lata Mangeshkar
"Mil Gayi Mujhe Achanak"	Kishore Kumar
"Pyar Hai Pyar"	Asha Bhosle
