= List of Hindi films of 1978 =

A list of films produced by the Bollywood film industry based in Mumbai in 1975

== Highest-grossing films ==
The ten highest-grossing films (without adjusting inflation) at the Indian box office in 1978 are:

Rank	Title	Gross collection
1	Muqaddar Ka Sikandar	₹17 crore
2	Trishul	₹11 crore
3	Don	₹7 crore
4	Azaad	₹6 crore
5	Main Tulsi Tere Aangan Ki	₹5.5 crore
6	Swarg Narak	₹5 crore
7	Kasme Vaade	₹4.8 crore
8	Ganga Ki Saugandh	₹4.6 crore
9	Satyam Shivam Sundaram	₹4.5 crore
10	Phandebaaz	₹4.2 crore

== Films ==
Title	Director	Cast	Genre	Sources
Aahuti	Ashok V. Bhushan	Rajendra Kumar, Shashi Kapoor, Rakesh Roshan, Parveen Babi, Zaheera	Drama	
Aakhri Daku	Prakash Mehra	Randhir Kapoor, Vinod Khanna, Rekha, Reena Roy, Sujit Kumar	Action	
Adventures of Aladdin	Homi Wadia	Sachin, Nazneen	Adventure	
Amar Shakti	Harmesh Malhotra	Shashi Kapoor, Shatrughan Sinha		
Anjane Mein	Samir Ganguly	Rishi Kapoor, Neetu Singh, Sachdev, Jagdeep	Family, Drama	
Ankh Ka Tara	Shantilal Soni	Sachin, Bindiya Goswami		
Ankhiyon Ke Jharokhon Se	Hiren Nag	Ranjeeta Kaur, Sachin, Madan Puri, Iftekhar, Urmila Bhatt	Drama, Inspirational, Educational	
Anmol Tasveer	Satyen Bose	Birbal, Manik Dutt		
Apna Khoon	Babbar Subhash	Shashi Kapoor, Hema Malini, Ashok Kumar, Pran, Amjad Khan	Action, Comedy	
Arvind Desai Ki Ajeeb Dastaan	Saeed Akhtar Mirza	Sulabha Deshpande, Dilip Dhawan, Om Puri, Shriram Lagoo, Anjali Paigankar	Drama	
Atithee	Aravind Sen	Shashi Kapoor, Shabana Azmi, Shatrughan Sinha, Vidya Sinha, Utpal Dutt	Romantic, Drama	
Azaad	Pramod Chakravorty	Dharmendra, Hema Malini, Prem Chopra, Ajit Khan	Action, Thriller	
Badalte Rishtey	R. Jhalani	Rishi Kapoor, Jeetendra, Reena Roy	Drama	
Besharam	Deven Verma	Amitabh Bachchan, Deven Verma, Sharmila Tagore, Amjad Khan	Drama, Thriller	
Bhakti Mein Shakti	Dara Singh	Dara Singh, Satish Kaul	Devotional	
Bhola Bhala	Satpal	Rajesh Khanna, Moushumi Chatterjee	Drama	
Bhookh	H. Dinesh, Ramesh Puri	Shatrughan Sinha, Reena Roy	Action	
Chakravyuha	Basu Chatterjee	Rajesh Khanna, Neetu Singh, Vinod Mehra, Simple Kapadia	Thriller	
Chor Ho To Aisa	Ravi Tandon	Shatrughan Sinha, Reena Roy, Pran	Drama	
Chor Ke Ghar Chor	Vijay Sadanah	Zeenat Aman, Randhir Kapoor, Ashok Kumar, Deven Verma, Pran	Drama	
Chowki No.11	V. K. Sobti	Vinod Mehra, Amjad Khan, Zarina Wahab	Action	
College Girl	S. D. Narang	Sachin, Bindiya Goswami	Drama	
Daaku Aur Jawan	Sunil Dutt	Sunil Dutt, Vinod Khanna, Reena Roy, Ranjeet	Action	
Damaad	Rajat Rakshit	Amol Palekar, Ranjeeta, Shriram Lagoo	Comedy, Drama	
Darwaza	Shyam Ramsay, Tulsi Ramsay	Anil Dhawan, Anju Mahendra, Shakti Kapoor	Horror	
Des Pardes	Dev Anand	Dev Anand, Tina Munim, Pran, Ajit Khan, Amjad Khan, Prem Chopra, Mehmood, Bindu	Drama	
Devata	S. Ramanathan	Sanjeev Kumar, Rakesh Roshan, Sarika, Shabana Azmi	Drama	
Dil Aur Deewaar	K. Bapaiah	Jeetendra, Moushumi Chatterjee	Drama	
Dil Se Mile Dil	Bhisham Kohli	Vishal Anand, Shyamlee, Lalita Pawar, Mehmood		
Dillagi	Basu Chatterjee	Dharmendra, Hema Malini	Comedy Drama	
Do Musafir	Devendra Goel	Shashi Kapoor, Rekha, Pran		
Don	Chandra Barot	Amitabh Bachchan, Zeenat Aman, Pran, Iftekhar, Yusuf Khan, Mac Mohan, Helen	Action	
Dr. Iqbal	Khwaja Ahmad Abbas			
Ek Baap Chhe Bete	Mehmood	Mehmood, Jaya Bhaduri, Yogeeta Bali, Pucky Ali, Lucky Ali, Macky Ali	Drama	
Gaman	Mujafar Ali	Farooq Sheikh, Smita Patil	Drama	
Ganga Ki Saugandh	Sultan Ahmad	Amitabh Bachchan, Rekha, Pran	Action	
Ganga Sagar	Ashish Kumar	Trilok Kapoor, Bela Bose		
Ghar	Manik Chatterjee	Vinod Mehra, Rekha	Drama	
Ghata	Kuldeep Pandey	Anil Dhawan, Pradeep Kumar, Debashree Roy	Drama	
Hamara Sansar	T. Prakesh Rao	Nutan, Parikshit Sahni		
Heeralaal Pannalaal	Ashok Roy	Shashi Kapoor, Randhir Kapoor, Neetu Singh, Zeenat Aman	Drama	
Hullabaloo Over Georgie and Bonnie's Pictures	James Ivory	Victor Banerjee, Aparna Sen	Comedy	
Howrah Bridge Pe Latakti Hui Lash			Adult Comedy	
Hungama Bombay Ishtyle	Siraj Ayesha Sahani	Amrish Puri, Naseeruddin Shah	Drama	
Junoon	Shyam Benegal	Shashi Kapoor, Jennifer Kendal	Historical Drama	
Kaala Aadmi	Ramesh Lakhanpal	Sunil Dutt, Saira Banu		
Karmayogi	Ram Maheshwari	Raaj Kumar, Jeetendra, Rekha	Drama	
Kasme Vaade	Ramesh Behl	Amitabh Bachchan, Raakhee Gulzhar, Randhir Kapoor, Neetu Singh, Amjad Khan	Action	
Khatta Meetha	Basu Chatterjee	Rakesh Roshan, Bindiya Goswami, Ashok Kumar, Pearl Padamsee	Drama	
Khoon Ka Badla Khoon	Kalpataru	Vinod Khanna, Mehandra Sandhu, Padma Khanna		
Khoon Ki Pukaar	Ramesh Ahuja	Vinod Khanna, Shabana Azmi, Pran	Action	
Kondura	Shyam Benegal	Ananth Nag, Vanisri, Smita Patil, Amrish Puri	Drama	
Lal Kothi	Kanak Mukherjee	Ranjit Mallick, Utpal Dutt, Tanuja	Thriller	
Main Tulsi Tere Aangan Ki	Raj Khosla	Nutan, Vinod Khanna, Asha Parekh	Drama	
Madhu Malti	Basu Bhattacharya	Sachin, Sarika	Romance	
Mera Rakshak	R. Thiyagaraj	Mithun Chakraborty, Talluri Rameshwari, Rakesh Pandey	Action	
Muqaddar Ka Sikandar	Prakash Mehra	Amitabh Bachchan, Vinod Khanna, Raakhee Gulzar, Rekha, Amjad Khan, Ranjeet, Yusuf Khan	Drama	
Nalayak	Padmanabh	Jeetendra, Leena Chandavarkar	Drama	
Nasbandi	I. S. Johar	I. S. Johar	Comedy	
Naukri	Hrishikesh Mukherjee	Rajesh Khanna, Raj Kapoor, Zaheera, Nadira	Drama	
Nawab Sahib	Rajinder Singh Bedi	Rehana Sultan, Parikshit Sahni		
Naya Daur	Mahesh Bhatt	Rishi Kapoor, Bhavana Bhatt, Farida Jalal, Danny Denzongpa, Om Prakash		
Parmatma	Chand	Shatrughan Sinha, Rekha	Adventure	
Pati Patni Aur Woh	B. R. Chopra	Sanjeev Kumar, Vidya Sinha	Drama	
Phaansi	Harmesh Malhotra	Shashi Kapoor, Pran, Sulakshana Pandit	Drama	
Phandebaaz	Samir Ganguly	Dharmendra, Moushumi Chatterjee, Prem Chopra	Action, Comedy	
Phool Khile Hain Gulshan Gulshan	Surinder Kapoor	Moushumi Chatterjee, Rishi Kapoor		
Premi Gangaram	Jagdish Nirula	Ashok Kumar, Yogeeta Bali	Romance	
Rahu Ketu	B. R. Ishara	Shashi Kapoor, Rekha	Action	
Raja Rani Ko Chahiye Pasina	Sulabha Deshpande	Sushant Raj, Durga, Dasraj		
Ram Kasam	Chand Srivastava	Sunil Dutt, Rekha, Bindiya Goswami	Action	
Saajan Bina Suhagan	Sawan Kumar Tak	Rajendra Kumar, Nutan, Vinod Mehra, Padmini Kolhapure	Drama	
Saawan Ke Geet	R. Bhattacharya	Sanjeev Kumar, Rekha		
Safed Haathi	Tapan Sinha	Shatrughan Sinha	Children's	
Satyam Shivam Sundaram	Raj Kapoor	Shashi Kapoor, Zeenat Aman	Romance	
Shalimar	Krishna Shah	Dharmendra, Zeenat Aman, Shammi Kapoor	Drama	
Sone Ka Dil Lohe Ke Haath	Naresh Kumar HN	Rajendra Kumar, Dara Singh, Mala Sinha, Vidya Sinha	Action	
Swarg Narak	Dasari Narayana Rao	Sanjeev Kumar, Jeetendra, Vinod Mehra, Shabana Azmi, Tanuja, Moushumi Chatterjee	Drama	
Toote Khilone	Ketan Anand	Shekhar Kapur, Shabana Azmi, Utpal Dutt		
Trishna	Anil Ganguly	Shashi Kapoor, Sanjeev Kumar, Rakhee Gulzar	Drama	
Trishul	Yash Chopra	Amitabh Bachchan, Sanjeev Kumar, Shashi Kapoor, Hema Malini, Rakhee Gulzar, Poonam Dillon, Sachin	Drama	
Tumhare Liye	Basu Chatterjee	Vidya Sinha, Sanjeev Kumar	Supernatural Drama	
Tumhari Kasam	Ravi Chopra	Jeetendra, Moushumi Chatterjee	Drama	
Vishwanath	Subhash Ghai	Shatrughan Sinha, Reena Roy, Pran	Action	

== See also ==
- List of Hindi films of 1977
- List of Hindi films of 1979
