= List of Hindi films of 1977 =

A list of films produced by the Bollywood film industry based in Mumbai in 1977:

== Highest-grossing films ==
These are the highest-grossing Hindi films of 1977. Gross collection figures are worldwide, unless otherwise noted.

Rank	Title	Gross collection	Notes
1	Amar Akbar Anthony	₹17.67 crore	
2	Dharam Veer	₹13.50 crore	Domestic gross
3	Chacha Bhatija	₹10.47 crore	
4	Hum Kisise Kum Naheen	₹8.50 crore	Domestic gross
5	Parvarish	₹7.50 crore	Domestic gross
6	Adalat	₹6.03 crore	
7	Dildaar	₹5.50 crore	
8	Khoon Pasina	₹5 crore	Domestic gross
9	Dream Girl	₹4.77 crore	
10	Aadmi Sadak Ka	₹4.66 crore	

== A-Z ==
Title	Director	Cast	Genre	sources
Aadmi Sadak Ka	Devendra Goel	Shatrughan Sinha, Vikram, Zaheera, Sujit Kumar, Deven Verma	Drama	
Aafat	Atma Ram	Navin Nischol, Leena Chandavarkar, Amjad Khan, Mehmood	Crime Thriller	
Aaina	K. Balachander	Rajesh Khanna, Mumtaz, A. K. Hangal, Nirupa Roy, Lalita Pawar	Drama	
Aakhri Goli	Shibu Mitra	Sunil Dutt, Leena Chandavarkar, Farida Jalal, Amjad Khan, Om Prakash	Action	
Aakhri Sajda		Mala Sinha, Murad, Helen, Jagdeep		
Aap Ki Khatir	Sudhendu Roy	Vinod Khanna, Rekha, Nadira, Helen, Tun Tun, Om Shivpuri		
Aashiq Hoon Baharon Ka	J. Om Prakash	Rajesh Khanna, Zeenat Aman, Danny Denzongpa, Preeti Ganguli	Romance	
Ab Kya Hoga	Sawan Kumar	Shatrughan Sinha, Neetu Singh, Asrani, Bindu, Moushumi Chatterjee, Ranjeet	Drama	
Abhi To Jee Lein	Roshan Taneja	Jaya Bhaduri, Danny Denzongpa, Simi Garewal, Iftekhar	College Drama	
Adha Din Aadhi Raat	Doondi	Vinod Khanna, Shabana Azmi, Asha Parekh	Action	
Agar... If	Esmayeel Shroff	Amol Palekar, Zarina Wahab, Kader Khan	Drama	
Agent Vinod	Deepak Bahry	Mahendra Sandhu, Pinchu Kapoor	Spy Drama	
Alaap	Hrishikesh Mukherjee	Amitabh Bachchan, Rekha	Musical Drama	
Alibaba Marjinaa	Kedar Kapoor	Prem Kishan, Tamanna, Urmila Bhatt, Birbal, Jagdeep, Pinchoo Kapoor, Shakti Kapoor	Drama	
Amaanat	Shatrujit Paul	Manoj Kumar, Sadhana Shivdasani, Balraj Sahni, Mehmood	Drama	
Amar Akbar Anthony	Manmohan Desai	Amitabh Bachchan, Rishi Kapoor, Vinod Khanna, Neetu Singh, Shabana Azmi, Parveen Babi, Pran, Nirupa Roy, Jeevan (Hindi actor), Ranjeet, Yusuf Khan	Romance	
Anand Ashram	Shakti Samanta	Ashok Kumar, Uttam Kumar, Sharmila Tagore	Drama	
Angaare	Govind Saraiya	Sanjeev Kumar, Raakhee Gulzar		
Anurodh	Shakti Samanta	Ashok Kumar, Rajesh Khanna, Simple Kapadia, Vinod Mehra	Musical Drama	
Apnapan	J. Om Prakash	Jeetendra, Sulakshana Pandit, Reena Roy	Drama	
Bhumika	Shyam Benegal	Smita Patil, Naseeruddin Shah, Amrish Puri	Drama	
Chacha Bhatija	Manmohan Desai	Dharmendra, Randhir Kapoor, Hema Malini, Yogeta Bali	Drama	
Chakkar Pe Chakkar	Ashok Roy	Shashi Kapoor, Rekha, Pran	Romance, Comedy	
Chala Murari Hero Banne	G. Asrani	Asrani, Bindiya Goswami	Comedy	
Chalta Purza	Bhappi Sonie	Rajesh Khanna, Parveen Babi	Action Thriller	
Chandi Sona	Sanjay Khan	Sanjay Khan, Parveen Babi, Pran	Thriller	
Charandas	B. S. Thapa	Om Prakash	Drama	
Chhailla Babu	Joy Mukherjee	Rajesh Khanna, Zeenat Aman	Suspense Thriller	
Chor Sipahee	Prayag Raj	Shashi Kapoor, Vinod Khanna, Parveen Babi	Drama	
Daku Aur Mahatma	Ravikant Nagaich	Rajendra Kumar, Reena Roy, Kabir Bedi, Yogeeta Bali	Action	
Darling Darling	Gogi Anand	Dev Anand, Zeenat Aman, Mehmood, Jeevan, Helen		
Dharam Veer	Manmohan Desai	Dharmendra, Jeetendra, Zeenat Aman, Neetu Singh, Pran, Jeevan, Ranjeet	Drama	
Dhoop Chhaon	Prahllad Sharma	Sanjeev Kumar, Hema Malini, Yogeeta Bali		
Dildaar	K. Bapaiah	Jeetendra, Rekha	Action	
Do Chehere	Kewal Misra	Dharmendra, Prem Nath, Bindu	Drama	
Do Sholay	Sukhdev Ahluwalia	Dharmendra		
Doosra Aadmi	Ramesh Talwar	Rishi Kapoor, Neetu Singh, Raakhee Gulzhar, Shashi Kapoor	Romantic, Drama	
Dream Girl	Pramod Chakravorty	Dharmendra, Hema Malini	Drama	
Dulhan Wahi Jo Piya Man Bhaye	Lekh Tandon	Talluri Rameshwari, Prem Krishen, Madan Puri	Musical Drama	
Ek Hi Raasta	Mohan Segal	Jeetendra, Shabana Azmi	Drama	
Farishta Ya Qatil	S. M. Abbas	Shashi Kapoor, Rekha, Pran	Action	
Gayatri Mahima	Harsukh Jagneshwar Bhatt	Bharat Bhushan, Jayshree Gadkar	Fantasy	
Gharonda	Bhimsain Khurana	Amol Palekar, Zarina Wahab	Drama	
Haiwan	Ram Rano	Deb Mukherjee, Joy Mukherjee	Thriller	
Hatyara	Surendra Mohan	Pran, Vinod Khanna, Moushumi Chatterjee	Action, Crime	
Hira Aur Patthar	Vijay Bhatt	Shashi Kapoor, Shabana Azmi		
Hum Kisise Kum Naheen	Nasir Hussain	Rishi Kapoor, Tariq Khan, Kaajal Kiran, Amjad Khan, Zeenat Aman	Drama	
Immaan Dharam	Desh Mukherjee	Amitabh Bachchan, Shashi Kapoor, Sanjeev Kumar, Rekha	Action, Drama	
Inkaar	Raj N. Sippy	Vinod Khanna, Amjad Khan, Vidya Singh	Thriller	
Jadu Tona	Ravikant Nagaich	Feroz Khan, Reena Roy	Horror	
Jagriti	Rajendra Bhatia	Vinod Mehra, Reena Roy, Nutan, Prem Chopra		
Jai Dwarkadheesh	Sushil Gupta	Ramesh Deo, Manher Desai, Anita Guha		
Jallian Wala Bagh	Balraj Tah	Vinod Khanna, Parikshit Sahni, Shabana Azmi	Historical Drama	
Janam Janam Na Saathi/Phir Janam Lenge Hum	Mehul Kumar	Adil Amman, Bhavana Bhaat, Jagdeep, Iftekhar		
Jay Vejay	L. V. Prasad	Jeetendra, Prem Kishan, Reena Roy	Action	
Jeevan Mukt	Sudhendu Roy	Girish Karnad, Laxmi, Parikshit Sahni, Vidya Sinha, Suresh Oberoi	Family, Drama	
Kachcha Chor	Jambu	Randhir Kapoor, Rekha	Drama	
Kalabaaz	Ashok Roy	Dev Anand, Zeenat Aman	Drama	
Kali Raat	Shririram Bohra	Vinod Mehra, Yogeeta Bali		
Karm	B.R. Chopra	Rajesh Khanna, Vidya Sinha	Drama	
Kasam Khoon Ki	Ashok Roy	Jeetendra, Sulakshana Pandit	Action Drama	
Khel Khilari Ka	Arjun Hingorani	Dharmendra, Shabana Azmi, Dev Kumar	Action	
Khoon Pasina	Rakesh Kumar	Amitabh Bachchan, Vinod Khanna, Rekha	Action	
Kinara	Gulzar	Jeetendra, Dharmendra, Hema Malini	Romance, Drama	
Kissa Kursi Ka	Amrit Nahata	Shabana Azmi, Raj Kiran, Utpal Dutt	Political Satire	
Kitaab	Gulzar	Master Raju, Uttam Kumar	Drama	
Kotwal Saab	Hrishikesh Mukherjee	Shatrughan Sinha, Aparna Sen	Action	
Ladki Jawan Ho Gayi	Anand Dasani	Sujit Kumar, Manorama		
Maha Badmaash	R. G. Thaker	Vinod Khanna, Neetu Singh, Bindu		
Mama Bhanja	Naresh Kumar	Shammi Kapoor, Randhir Kapoor, Parveen Babi		
Mastan Dada	Satyen Bose	Sanjay Khan, Parveen Babi, Ashok Kumar, Ranjeet		
Meethi Meethi Baatein	K. Balachander	Kamal Hassan, Jaya Pradha, Aalam, Y. Vijaya		
Mera Vachan Geeta Ki Kasam	Vinod Kumar	Sanjay Khan, Saira Banu, Om Prakash		
Mukti	Raj Tilak	Shashi Kapoor, Vidya Sinha, Sanjeev Kumar, Mithun Chakraborty	Drama	
Naami Chor	Kamal Mehra	Biswajit Chatterjee, Shatrughan Sinha, Leena Chandavarkar	Action	
Ooparwala Jaane	Naresh Saigal	Vinod Mehra, Rehana Sultan		
Paapi	O. P. Ralhan	Sunil Dutt, Sanjeev Kumar, Reena Roy, Zeenat Aman, Danny, O. P. Ralhan	Drama	
Paheli	Prashant Nanda	Satyajeet, Nameeta Chandra, Durga Khote, A. K. Hangal	Drama	
Palkon Ki Chhaon Mein	Meraj	Rajesh Khanna, Hema Malini	Drama	
Pandit Aur Pathan	Joginder	Agha, Helen, Nazir Hussain, Mehmood	Action	
Parvarish	Manmohan Desai	Shammi Kapoor, Amitabh Bachchan, Vinod Khanna, Shabana Azmi, Neetu Singh, Amjad Khan, Kader Khan, Tom Alter	Drama	
Pratima Aur Paayal	Saran Agarwal	Rita Bhaduri, Sachin Pilgaonkar, Sarika		
Prayashchit	Kamal Majumdar	Ashok Kumar, Mala Sinha, Nanda, Jagdeep	Drama	
Priyatama	Basu Chatterjee	Jeetendra, Neetu Singh	Musical	
Ram Bharose	Anand Sagar	Randhir Kapoor, Rekha, Dara Singh, Amjad Khan	Action Comedy	
Safed Jhooth	Basu Chatterjee	Vinod Mehra, Moushumi Chatterjee	Comedy Drama	
Saheb Bahadur	Chetan Anand	Dev Anand, Priya Jaswanst, Asrani	Comedy Drama	
Shankar Hussain	Yusuf Naqvi	Kanwaljit Singh	Drama	
Shatranj Ke Khilari	Satyajit Ray	Sanjeev Kumar, Shabana Azmi, Farida Jalal	Drama	
Shirdi Ke Sai Baba	Ashok V. Bhushan	Sudhir Dalvi, Manoj Kumar, Rajendra Kumar, Hema Malini	Devotional	
Shri Ram Vanvas	Kamalakara Kameshwara Rao	K. S. Ravikumar, Jaya Prada	Drama	
Swami	Basu Chatterjee	Girish Karnad, Shabana Azmi, Utpal Dutt	Romance, Drama	
Tabbaliyu Neenade Magane	Girish Karnad, B. V. Karanth	Kulbhushan Kharbanda, Om Puri, Naseeruddin Shah	Drama	
Taxi-Taxie	Irshad	Amol Palekar, Zaheera	Drama	
Thief of Baghdad	Ravikant Nagaich	Shatrughan Sinha, Sulakshana Pandit, Kabir Bedi, Prem Chopra, Mehmood, Premnath		
Tinku	Kalpataru	Rajesh Khanna, Vinod Mehra, Rehana Sultan		
Tyaag	Din Dayal Sharma	Rajesh Khanna, Sharmila Tagore	Drama	
Vishwasghaat 1977	Mahesh Bhaat	Sanjeev Kumar, Sabhana Azmi, Kabir Bedi	Drama	
Yaaron Ka Yaar	A. Bhimsingh	Shatrughan Sinha, Leena Chandavarkar	Action	
Yehi Hai Zindagi	K. S. Sethumadhavan	Sanjeev Kumar, Seema, Lucky Ali	Devotional	
Zamaanat	A. Salaam	Jeetendra, Reena Roy, Amjad Khan	Action	
Zehreeli	V. N. Reddy	Shailendra Singh, Neethu Singh, Bindu, Imtiaz Khan		

== See also ==
- List of Hindi films of 1976
- List of Hindi films of 1978
