= Chatterjee =

Origin
- Origin: Bengali Hindu
- Region of origin: Bengal

Chatterjee (Bengali: চ্যাটার্জি), also known as Chattopadhyay, is a Bengali Hindu surname, used by the Kulin group of the Bengali Brahmin caste. Together with Banerjees, Mukherjees, Bhattacharjees, and Gangulys, Chatterjees form the Kulin Brahmins, the highest tier of the Bengali caste system. They belong to Rarhi clan of Bengali Brahmins and the Kashyapa gotra.

== Variation ==
Chatterjee is an Anglicized variant of the Sanskritized Chattopadhyay. English language spellings include Chatterjee, Chatterjea, Chatterji, Chaterjee, Chattopadhyay, and Chattopadhyaya.

== Notable Chatterjees ==
- Abhishek Chatterjee – Bengali film and television actor
- Abir Chatterjee – actor
- Adhar Kumar Chatterji – former Chief of the Naval Staff of the Indian Navy (1966–1970)
- Aditi Chatterjee – Bengali film and television actress
- Alok Chatterjee – theatre actor and director
- Amarendranath Chatterjee – freedom fighter
- Amitabha Chattopadhyay – biophysicist
- Amitava Chattopadhyay – INSEAD professor of marketing and innovation
- Angana P. Chatterji – anthropologist, activist and feminist historian
- Anil Chatterjee – actor
- Anindo Chatterjee – tabla player
- Anjan Chatterjee (neuroscientist) – cognitive neuroscientist
- Aroup Chatterjee – British Indian atheist, physician, author of Mother Teresa: The Untold Story
- Ashim Chatterjee – politician and activist
- Asima Chatterjee – Indian organic chemist and the second woman to be conferred a Doctorate of Science by an Indian university
- Atul Chandra Chatterjee – Indian diplomat and government official. Served as the Indian High Commissioner to the United Kingdom from 1925 to 1931.
- Bamacharan Chattopadhyay – ardent devotee of Maa Tara, also considered to be an avatar of Lord Shiva
- Bankim Chandra Chatterjee – Indian patriot, writer, poet and journalist and composer of Vande Mataram, the national song of India
- Basu Chatterjee – film director
- Bhaswar Chatterjee – Indian actor
- Biswajit Chatterjee – Bollywood actor
- Debabarta Chatterjee – botanist
- Debiprasad Chattopadhyaya – author, philosopher
- Debjani Chatterji – Indian-born British poet
- Deen K. Chatterjee - philosopher
- Dhritiman Chatterjee – actor
- Dhruva Chatterjee – writer and screenplay writer of Hindi movies
- Dipankar Chatterji – molecular biologist
- Gadadhar Chattopadhyay – Sri Sri Ramakrishna Paramahansa, devotee of Dakshina Kali and Priest of Dakshineswar Kali Temple.
- Gautam Chattopadhyay – musician
- Harindranath Chattopadhyay – poet, actor and brother of Sarojini Naidu
- Indira Chatterji (born 1973), Swiss-Indian mathematician
- Jogesh Chandra Chatterjee – Indian freedom fighter, activist and member of Rajya Sabha
- Joya Chatterji – Professor of South Asian history
- Kamaladevi Chattopadhyay – social reformer
- Kshetresa Chandra Chattopadhyaya – Sanskrit scholar
- Mirai Chatterjee – Indian social worker
- Mohini Mohun Chatterji – theosophist, scholar
- Moushumi Chatterjee – Bollywood actress
- Neil Chatterjee – American lawyer, political advisor, and government official, chair of the Federal Energy Regulatory Commission twice between 2017 and 2020
- Nigamananda – Yogi
- Parambrata Chatterjee – actor
- Partha Chatterjee – scholar and author
- Piya Chattopadhyay – Canadian broadcaster
- Pratap Chatterjee – journalist and author
- Priyadarshini Chatterjee – Miss India World 2016
- Priyanshu Chatterjee – Bollywood actor
- Prosenjit Chatterjee – actor
- Pulok Chatterji – former bureaucrat and Principal Secretary to the Prime Minister of India (2011–2014)
- Purnendu Chatterjee – businessman, founder of TCG
- Rabiranjan Chattopadhyay, Indian politician
- Ramakrishna Paramahamsa – born Gadadhar Chattopadhyay, a famous mystic of 19th-century India
- Ramananda Chatterjee — founder, editor, and owner of the Modern Review, he has been described as the father of Indian journalism
- Rangan Chatterjee – Physician, author, television presenter and broadcaster
- Sabitri Chatterjee – Indian Bengali female actress
- Sankar Chatterjee – paleontologist
- Sarat Chandra Chattopadhyay, Indian writer
- Sarojini Naidu née Chattopadhyay – freedom fighter, poet
- Saswata Chatterjee – actor
- Shakti Chattopadhyay – poet
- Shekhar Chatterjee – entrepreneur
- Shiba P. Chatterjee – professor, former president of International Geographical Union
- Sitaramdas Omkarnath – Bhakti saint
- Somnath Chatterjee – eminent lawyer and former speaker of Lok Sabha
- Soumitra Chatterjee – actor
- Sourav Chatterjee – mathematician
- Sovan Chatterjee – former mayor of the city of Kolkata
- Srabanti Chatterjee – actress
- Subhendu Chatterjee – actor
- Subhadeep Chatterjee – Indian molecular biologist
- Sudeep Chatterjee – cinematographer
- Sudip Chattopadhyay – biologist
- Suman Chatterjee (now Kabir Suman) – musician
- Suniti Kumar Chatterji – Indian linguist, educationist and litterateur
- Swapan Chattopadhyay – director of the Cockcroft Institute
- Tannishtha Chatterjee – actress
- Upamanyu Chatterjee – author
- Utpal Chatterjee – cricketer
- Uttam Kumar (Arun Chatterjee) – actor
- Vikram Chatterjee – Indian actor of Bengali cinema
- Virendranath Chattopadhyaya – activist

== See also ==
- Bengali Hindus
- Bengali Brahmins
- Kulin Brahmins
