= Ganguly =

Ganguly may refer to:

- Ganguly (surname), including a list of people with the name
  - Ganguly family, Indian film family, including Ashok and Kishore Kumar

== Places ==
- Gangolli, Kundapura taluk of Udupi, India
- Gangolihat, Kumaon region, Uttarakhand, India
