= Khatta Meetha (1978 film) =

1978 India Hindi-language film

- Directed by: Basu Chatterjee
- Written by: Basu Chatterjee
- Screenplay by: Basu Chatterjee
- Produced by: Gul Anand; Romu Sippy
- Starring: Ashok Kumar; Pearl Padamsee; Rakesh Roshan; Bindiya Goswami; Devendra Khandelwal; Deven Verma; David Abraham Cheulkar
- Cinematography: A. K. Bir
- Edited by: Subhash Gupta
- Music by: Rajesh Roshan
- Release date: 6 January 1978
- Country: India
- Language: Hindi

Khatta Meetha (English: Sweet and Sour) is a 1978 Hindi film directed by Basu Chatterjee. The film stars Ashok Kumar, Rakesh Roshan, Bindiya Goswami, Pearl Padamsee, Deven Verma, David Abraham Cheulkar, Ranjit Chowdhry, Preeti Ganguly, Pradeep Kumar and Iftekhar. The film's lyrics were written by Gulzar and music was scored by Rajesh Roshan. At the 26th Filmfare Awards, Deven Verma was nominated for Filmfare Award for Best Performance in a Comic Role for the film, but won it for Chor Ke Ghar Chor. This was also the debut film of actor Ranjit Chowdhry, who later appeared in films like Basu Chatterjee's Baton Baton Mein (1979) and Hrishikesh Mukherjee's Khubsoorat (1980).

Contrary to popular belief, the movie isn't loosely based on the 1968 American movie Yours, Mine and Ours but is based on a Turkish film titled Bizim Aile (1975). The movie was an inspiration for the 2010 comedy Golmaal 3.

== Plot ==
Homi Mistry (Ashok Kumar) is a Parsi widower who is about to retire. He lives in a small home with his four sons. Realizing that he may need emotional support and someone to take care of the house and his sons, he decides to remarry. His friend Soli (David Abraham Cheulkar) introduces him to a Parsi widow Nargis Sethna (Pearl Padamsee), who has one daughter and two sons. Hell breaks loose as both the families are informed of the alliance.

How the two families learn to adjust with each other and come up with solutions for their problems forms the plot of the story.

== Cast ==
- Ashok Kumar as Homi Mistry
- Pearl Padamsee as Nargis Sethna
- Rakesh Roshan as Firoze Sethna
- Bindiya Goswami as Zarine
- Pradeep Kumar as Zarine's rich father
- Raviraaj as Fali Mistry
- Devendra Khandelwal as Jaal
- Deven Verma as Dara
- Piloo J Wadia as Dara's mother
- David Abraham as Soli
- Raju Shrestha as Peelu Mistry (as Master Raju)
- Preeti Ganguli as Freni Sethna
- Vikram (Vicky) Sahu as Fardeen Sethna
- Ranjit Chowdhry as Russie Mistry
- Iftekhar as Mr. Cooper (lawyer)
- Keshto Mukherjee as Milkman
- Ruby Mayer as Mrs. Perin Soli
- Amitabh Bachchan as himself (Guest Appearance)

== Soundtrack ==
The film has music by Rajesh Roshan and lyrics by Gulzar.

=== Track list ===
#	Title	Singer(s)
1	"Thoda Hai Thode Ki Zaroorat Hai"	Kishore Kumar, Lata Mangeshkar
2	"Tumse Mila Tha Pyar Kuch Achhe Naseeb The"	Kishore Kumar, Lata Mangeshkar
3	"Ye Jeena Hai Angur Ka Dana, Katha Meetha"	Kishore Kumar, Usha Mangeshkar
4	"Mummy O Mummy, Tu Kabb Saas Banegi"	Kishore Kumar
5	"Roll Roll"	Kishore Kumar, Amit Kumar
6	"Frenny O Frenny"	Amit Kumar, Shailender Singh

== Cultural references ==
A TV series produced by Cinevistaas Limited on DD Metro had the same title. The title of the song, Thoda Hai Thode Ki Zaroorat Hai by Gulzar was later used in the title of TV series, Thoda Hai Thode Ki Zaroorat Hai (1997) and Thoda Hai Bas Thode Ki Zaroorat Hai (2010). The 2010 Hindi film, Golmaal 3, used the idea of couple with children from marrying.
