= Dhuen Ki Lakeer =

- Directed by: Kishore Sahu
- Produced by: Kishore Sahu
- Starring: Parveen Babi; Urmila Bhatt; Preeti Ganguli
- Cinematography: S. N. Dubey
- Release date: 1974
- Country: India
- Language: Hindi

Dhuen Ki Lakeer is a 1974 Bollywood romance drama film directed and produced by Kishore Sahu. The film stars Parveen Babi, Urmila Bhatt and Preeti Ganguli.

== Cast ==
- Ramesh Arora
- Parveen Babi as Poonam
- Urmila Bhatt
- Preeti Ganguli
- Ashish Bohra
- Pinchoo Kapoor
- Lalita Kumari

== Songs ==
1. "Daur Wo Aa Gaya, Dil Ke Armaa Bike, Hosle Bik Gaye" - Mohammed Rafi
2. "Teree Jhil See Geharee Aankho Me" - Vani Jairam, Nitin Mukesh
3. "Ek Shama Jale Kahan, Parvano Ki Bhid Yaha" - Ajit Singh, Krishna
4. "Gauri Ke Maang Mein Sindoor, Kahi Dur Baje Shanai" - Ghanshyamji, Shamji
5. "Ik Abla Ik Maa Bik Gayi Daur Wo Aa Gaya ( Part II )" - Mohammed Rafi
