= Muqaddar =

Muqaddar may refer to:

- Muqaddar (1978 film), a 1978 Indian Hindi-language film starring Shashi Kapoor and Rekha
- Muqadar, a 1996 Indian Hindi-language action film by T. L. V. Prasad, starring Mithun Chakraborty
- Muqaddar (TV series), a 2020 Pakistani series
- "Mukaddar", a 2022 song by Indian singer Aaliyah Qureishi

== See also ==
- Muqaddar Ka Faisla, a 1987 Indian Hindi-language action-drama film by Prakash Mehra
- Muqaddar Ka Badshaah, a 1990 Indian Hindi-language action film by T. Rama Rao
- Muqaddar Ka Sikandar, a 1978 Indian Hindi-language action film by Prakash Mehra
- Muqaddar Ka Sikandar (1984 film), a Pakistani film
- Muqaddar Ka Sikandar (2020 film), a 2020 Indian Bhojpuri-language film starring Dinesh Lal Yadav
