= Daana Paani (1989 film) =

Dana Paani
- VCD cover
- Directed by: Deven Verma
- Produced by: Deven Verma
- Music by: Anu Malik
- Release date: 16 June 1989 (India)
- Running time: 135 minutes
- Country: India
- Language: Hindi

Dana Paani is a 1989 Indian Hindi-language film directed by Deven Verma, starring Ashok Kumar, Mithun Chakraborty, Padmini Kolhapure, Nirupa Roy, Sadashiv Amrapurkar, Aruna Irani, Shafi Inamdar, Asha Sachdev and Deven Verma.

== Soundtrack ==
1. "Dhokha Dhokha" - Padmini Kolhapure, Anu Malik
2. "Dana Pani" - Anup Jalota
3. "Dana Pani" v2 - Anup Jalota
4. "Dana Pani" v3 - Anup Jalota
5. "Jiski Bitiya Badi Ho Gayi" - Anu Malik
6. "Chik Chik Mirchi" - Padmini Kolhapure

== Cast ==
- Mithun Chakraborty as Satya Prakash Tripathi
- Padmini Kolhapure as Satya's fiancée
- Nirupa Roy as Satya Prakash's Mother
- Ashok Kumar as Sinha Lawyer, Satya's lawyer
- Aruna Irani as Savitri Devi
- Sadashiv Amrapurkar as Kutti Seth, Satya's house owner
- Shafi Inamdar as Gautam Prakash Tripathi, Satya's elder brother
- Sharat Saxena as Street Beggar
- Deven Verma as Pampu Seth
- Manik Irani as Zorro Goon
- Sudhir Dalvi as The Judge
- Rajesh Puri as Pyare Bhai
- Shreeram Lagoo as Singh Saab
- Mohan Choti as Driver
- Baby Ghazala as Gauri, Satya's sister
- Pinchoo Kapoor as (cameo appearance)
