= Vijay Kapoor =

Indian film director (1939–1990)

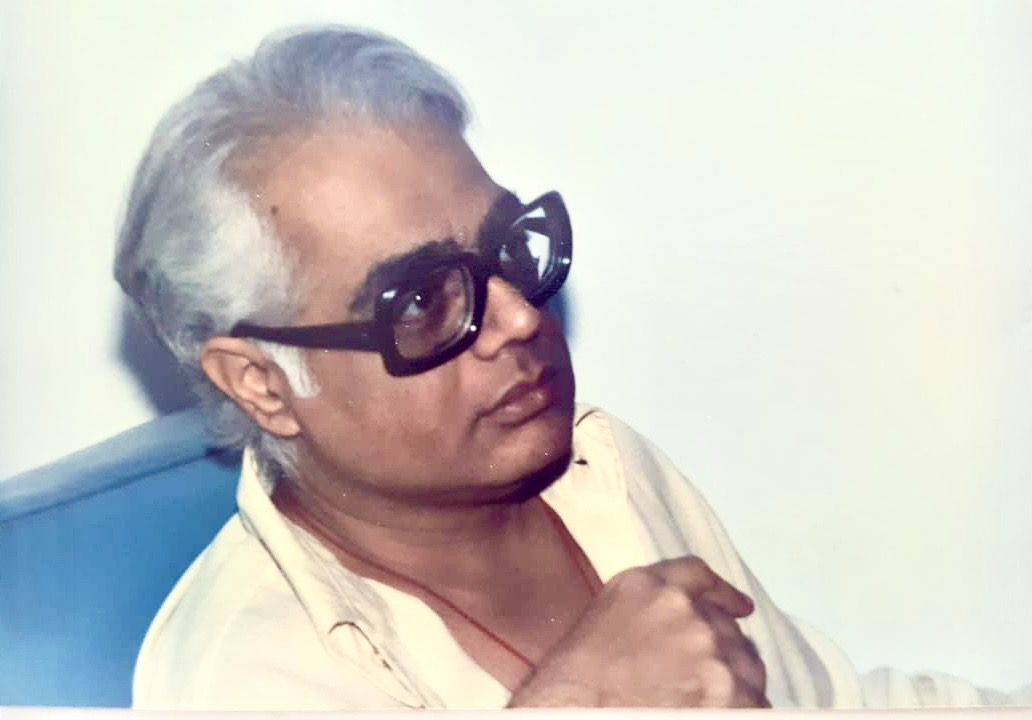
- Born: 30 October 1939; Mumbai, India
- Died: 10 April 1990 (aged 50); Mumbai, India
- Occupation: Film director
- Years active: 1962–1990
- Notable work: Call Girl, Raadha Aur Seeta, Akanksha
- Spouse: Veena Kapoor (m. 1963)
- Children: 3
- Relatives: See Kapoor family

Vijay Kapoor (30 October 1939 – 10 April 1990) was an Indian film director who worked in the Hindi film industry during the 1970s and 1980s. He is best known for directing Call Girl (1974), a film noted for its controversial themes and regarded in media retrospectives as ahead of its time. He was a member of the prominent Kapoor family, often referred to as the first family of Indian cinema

== Early life and family ==
Vijay Kapoor was born in 1939 to film actor Trilok Kapoor. He grew up in Mumbai, on R. P. Masani Road — popularly known as "Hollywood Street" in the 1940s. He was the nephew of actor Prithviraj Kapoor and cousin to Raj Kapoor, Shammi Kapoor, and Shashi Kapoor.

He also had an elder brother, Vicki Kapoor, who pursued a career in law. Vijay completed his schooling from Don Bosco High School and graduated from St. Xavier’s College, Mumbai, before joining the film industry in 1962 as an assistant director to S. N. Tripathi for his father’s production Shiv Parvati.

== Career ==
Vijay Kapoor began his film career with his home production Umeed Pe Duniya Jeeti Hai, starring his brother Vicki Kapoor and Rajshree. The film was eventually shelved and never released. He later reportedly directed another unreleased film which featured Prithviraj Kapoor, Shashi Kapoor, and Saira Banu.

Kapoor made his official directorial debut with Call Girl (1974), starring Vikram and Zaheera. Zaheera had previously appeared in the James Bond film On Her Majesty's Secret Service (1969), making her one of the few Hindi film actresses of her era with an international credit. The film, written by acclaimed screenwriter K. A. Abbas, explored themes that were considered controversial at the time. It received significant attention for its bold social commentary and has since been acknowledged as a film ahead of its time.

The film's music, composed by Sapan-Jagmohan with lyrics by Naqsh Lyallpuri, featured the song "Ulfat Mein Zamane Ki," sung by Lata Mangeshkar and Kishore Kumar was noted for its lyrical depth and melody.

He went on to direct other Hindi films, including Raadha Aur Seeta (1979) for Rajshri Productions, starring Arun Govil alongside Rita Bhaduri and Parakh (1986) starring Vijayendra Ghatge and Sarika.

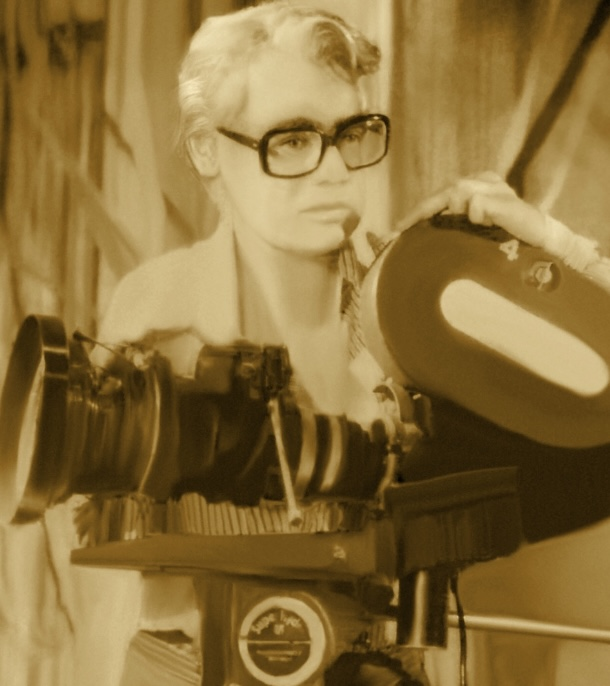
Vijay Kapoor on the sets of Raadha Aur Seeta.

In 1988, he produced the telefilm Akanksha, which starred Abhinav Chaturvedi, Supriya Pathak, Saeed Jaffrey, and Trilok Kapoor. The film, commissioned by Doordarshan, addressed the subject of physical disability.

== Personal life ==
Vijay Kapoor married Veena Kapoor in 1963, and they had three children. His elder son, Ajay Kapoor, built a career in sports broadcasting, while his younger son, Sanjay Kapoor, runs an advertising film production company in Bahrain. Their daughter, Anuradha, lives in India. After his passing, Veena Kapoor became a documentary filmmaker. Anuradha's daughter is settled in Australia.

== Death ==
Kapoor developed muscular dystrophy in his later years and died in Mumbai on 10 April 1990 at the age of 51.

== Filmography ==
- Call Girl (1974) – Director
- Raadha Aur Seeta (1979) – Director
- Parakh (1986) – Director
- Akanksha (1988, telefilm) – Producer/Director
