= Bada Kabutar =

1973 film by Deven Verma

- Poster
- Directed by: Deven Verma
- Written by: Akhtar ul-Iman
- Produced by: Deven Verma
- Starring: Ashok Kumar; Deven Verma; Rehana Sultan
- Music by: R. D. Burman
- Release date: 6 July 1973
- Country: India
- Language: Hindi

Bada Kabutar (transl. Big Pigeon) is a 1973 Bollywood action comedy film produced and directed by Deven Verma.

== Plot ==
Mama Rampuri comes from a long line of criminals and is contemplating his latest scheme. He plans to enlist the services of his nephew Bhola. Bhola however has had quite a few bad experiences with Mama and has been in and out of prison seven times trying to carry out Mama's mostly disastrous robbery plans.

However, his mother, does not listen to his pleas of wanting to live an honest life selling bananas or banyans and tries to inspire him by narrating the glorious deeds of his late father (her husband) who went to the prison no less than seventeen times and yet never complained. She pretends to have a heart disease and gets herself admitted in a hospital. Poor Bhola is wrongly convinced that a large amount of money is needed for her treatment.

Bhola reluctantly joins hands with Mama who recruits club dancer Rita alongside his trustworthy gang members Abdul and others to plan the heist of kidnapping the only son of millionaire businessman cum antisocial smuggler Seth Dharamdas. There is also Mama's old nemesis Ghaffoor who tries to thwart his plans and harm him at all stages.

== Cast ==
- Ashok Kumar as Mama Rampuri
- Deven Verma as Bhola
- Rehana Sultan as Rita
- Madan Puri as Gafoor
- Pinchoo Kapoor as Dharamdas
- Leela Mishra as Bhola's Mother
- Keshto Mukherjee as Abdul
- Sunder as Panna Tambuli
- Mehamood as Pinto (Guest Appearance)
- Amitabh Bachchan as Guest Appearance
- Helen as Dancer

== Soundtrack ==
Song	Singer
"Hay Re, Hay Re, Yeh Dil Mera, Hay Re, Hay Re"	Kishore Kumar, Asha Bhosle
"Bada Kabutar Ud Jayega"	Bhupinder Singh
"Raaz Ki Ek Baat Hai"	Asha Bhosle
"Chanda Mama Bole"	Asha Bhosle
"Mubarak Ho Yeh Raat"	Asha Bhosle
