= Call Girl (1974 film) =

- Directed by: Vijay Kapoor
- Release date: 1974
- Country: India
- Language: Hindi

Call Girl is a 1974 Bollywood romantic drama film directed by Vijay Kapoor.

== Plot ==
Amar returns from abroad and is asked by his multi-millionaire father, Sonachand, to assist with their family business; Amar agrees to do so, on the condition that he could spend the rest of the evening and night doing what he likes - painting.

He meets with a beautiful young woman by the name of Kamini, who at first does not disclose her name to him because she is a call girl.

However, Amar names her Maya and falls in love with her. When he attempts to introduce her to his parents, on reaching his house his mother accepts her, but there she sees his father's (Sonachand's) photo and she recalls that he is the same person who had forced her into prostitution by promising her a job.

He'd had an intimate relationship with her years ago and threatened her to get into this business, or else he would kidnap her sister who studies in a boarding school in Panchgani and throw her into this business.

But now, Kamini/Maya has decided to leave this profession. But Sonachand does not want Amar to marry a call girl. So he tells Kamini to act like a call girl once again so that Amar leaves her. Kamini agrees to do so, because she doesn't want Amar to face problems from society as well as his family.

But on the same night, Sonachand sees that his own daughter Usha has taken to prostitution. Meanwhile, Amar learns the truth about his father and shuns him.

His father shoots himself because of his guilt and Amar leaves his house to go to find Kamini, and sees that she has consumed slow poison and is about to die within a few hours. So Amar quickly uses her services as a call girl and pays her for a one-night stand before she dies.

== Cast ==
- Vikram as Amar
- Zaheera as Maya / Kamini
- Iftekhar as Sonachand
- Helen as Sylvia
- Jalal Agha
- Paintal as Ramesh
- Urmila Bhatt as Mrs. Sonachand
- Keshto Mukherjee
- Jankidas as Tikamchand
- Shefali as Usha
- Hina Kausar

=== Music ===
- Film score direction by Sapan-Jagmohan

== Music ==
1. "Ulfat Men Zamaane Ki" - Kishore Kumar, Lata Mangeshkar
2. "Ulfut Me Zamane Ki (Female)" - Lata Mangeshkar
3. "Hum Hai Jaha Wo Pyar Ki Mahki" - Kishore Kumar, Asha Bhosle
4. "Jawaani Mera Yaara Na Aayegi Dobara" - Ranu Mukherjee, Kishore Kumar
5. "Dil Jale To Koi Kya Kare" - Asha Bhosle
6. "I Am Call Girl" - Ranu Mukherjee

== Reception ==
In 2024, Amar Ujala published a retrospective marking the 50th anniversary of Call Girl, highlighting the film's bold treatment of a taboo subject and its lasting cultural relevance. The article praised director Vijay Kapoor for handling the theme of sex work with sensitivity and social awareness, noting that the film was ahead of its time in both narrative and execution.
