= Ganguly (surname) =

Origin
- Origin: Bengali Hindu
- Region of origin: Bengal

Ganguly (Bengali: গাঙ্গুলী), also known as Ganguli, Ganguly, Gangulee, Gangoly or Gangopadhyay is a native Bengali surname that is used by Kulin Brahmin group of the Bengali Brahmin caste. The traditional Bengali version of this surname is Gangopadhyay(a) or Gônggopaddhae.

== History ==
The Gangulys belong to the Kulin Brahmin class and are also classified as Rarhi class of Bengali Brahmin caste. According to texts, King Adisura invited five Brahmins to settle in the region from Kanauj and designated them higher in social status. Multiple accounts of this legend exist; historians generally consider it to be nothing more than myth or folklore, lacking historical authenticity. The tradition continues by saying that these incomers settled and each became the founder of a clan. The five Brahmin clans, which later became known as Mukherjees, Chatterjees, Banerjees, Gangulys and Bhattacharjees, were each designated as Kulina ("superior") in order to differentiate them from the more established local Brahmins.

== List of persons with the surname ==
=== Business ===
- Ashok Sekhar Ganguly, former chairman of Hindustan Lever
- Pablo Ganguli, (born 1983), Indian cultural entrepreneur

=== Academic ===
- Enakshi Ganguly, Indian children's rights activist
- Kadambini Ganguly, one of the two Indian women doctors who was first South Asian female physician, trained in western medicine to graduate in South Asia
- Theotonius Amal Ganguly (1920–1977), Archbishop of the Archdiocese of Dhaka

=== Politics ===
- Bipin Behari Ganguli (1887-unknown), Indian freedom fighter
- Pratul Chandra Ganguli, (1884–1957), Indian freedom fighter and revolutionary

=== Sport ===
- Bhaskar Ganguly, Indian footballer
- Sourav Ganguly (born 1972), former Indian cricket captain and former BCCI President
- S K Ganguli, cricket umpire
- Partho Ganguli, International Badminton Player. Current National Selector for the sport of Badminton, India

=== Chess ===
- Surya Shekhar Ganguly (born 1983), Indian chess grandmaster

=== Film and acting ===
- Ganguly family
- Ashok Kumar Ganguly (1911–2001), Indian actor
- Chhaya Devi (1914-2001), Indian actress of Bengali and Hindi movies
- Jahar Ganguly (1904 – 1969), Indian film actor and theatre personality
- Kaushik Ganguly (born 1968), Indian film director, screenwriter and actor
- Churni Ganguly, Indian actress of Bengali movies and TV serials
- Dhirendra Nath Ganguly (1893-1978), Bengali actor, director and entrepreneur
- Dimpy Ganguly, Indian model and actress
- Jeet Ganguly, Hindi and Bengali musical director, composer and singer
- Kaushik Ganguly, Indian director, screenwriter and actor (Bengali cinema)
- Kishore Kumar Ganguly (1929-1987), Indian singer and actor
- Mouli Ganguly, Indian television actor
- Pijush Ganguly, Indian television actor (Bengali)
- Preeti Ganguly, Indian actress
- Richa Gangopadhyay (born 1986), Indian actress
- Roopa Ganguly (born 1963), Indian actress
- Rupali Ganguly (born 1978), Indian actress
- Samir Ganguly, Indian film director
- Subhashree Ganguly (born 1989), Indian actress
- Usha Ganguly (born 1945) theatre director

=== Music ===
- Sunil Ganguly (died 1999), Indian guitarist

=== Writers and translators ===
- Kisari Mohan Ganguli, Indian translator (Mahabharata into English)
- Narayan Gangopadhyay (1918–1970), Bengali writer
- Sunil Gangopadhyay (1934-2012), Bengali writer
