= Ranjit Chowdhry =

Indian actor (1955–2020)

- Born: 19 September 1955; Bombay, Bombay State, India
- Died: 15 April 2020 (aged 64); Mumbai, Maharashtra, India
- Other names: Ranjit Chowdhary; Ranjit Chowdhury
- Children: 1
- Parent(s): Pearl Padamsee (mother), Alyque Padamsee (Step-father)

Ranjit Chowdhry (19 September 1955 – 15 April 2020) was an Indian character actor, known for his roles in television, movies, and theatre. He appeared in two episodes of The Office, as Vikram, a telemarketer who worked with Michael, and was briefly hired for The Michael Scott Paper Company.

For his role as Rocky in Deepa Mehta's 2002 film Bollywood/Hollywood, he was nominated for Best Performance by an Actor in a Supporting Role at the 23rd Genie Awards His other most noted role was in Last Holiday (2006), starring Queen Latifah.

== Life and career ==
Ranjit was born and raised in Mumbai in a family with a theatre background, where he received his early education at Campion School, Mumbai, and started his acting career. His father is from a Gujjar background, while his mother, Pearl Padamsee, was of partial Jewish descent on her mother's side, but remained Christian during her life. He made his film debut in Basu Chatterjee's Khatta Meetha, following which he played prominent parts in Hindi comedy classics such as Basu Chatterjee's Baton Baton Mein (1979) and Hrishikesh Mukherjee's Khubsoorat (1980). Thereafter, he moved to the United States in the early 1980s. He wrote the screenplay and acted in Sam & Me (directed by Deepa Mehta), which won an honorable mention at Cannes in 1991.

He was a guest star in Law & Order: Special Victims Unit, and had appeared in two seasons of The Office and Prison Break.

Sanjay Gupta, who worked with Chowdhry on the film Kaante, tweeted that his performances were a joy and "Khatta Meetha is my favourite."

== Personal life ==
His mother, Pearl Padamsee, was a well-known theatre personality, drama teacher and actress on stage and film. His stepfather, Alyque Padamsee, was a theatre actor and director who also headed an advertising company in Mumbai. He had one older sister named Rohini (c. 1951 – 26 September 1961), who died from nephritis.

=== Death ===
Chowdhry was in Mumbai for a dental procedure near the end of 2019, and was stuck in India due to the spread of COVID-19 and related lockdown. Chowdhry was admitted into Breach Candy Hospital, in Mumbai, on 14 April 2020 for a ruptured ulcer in the intestine, and underwent emergency surgery. He died on 15 April 2020 due to complications from surgery.

== Filmography ==
Year	Title	Role	Notes
1978	Khatta Meetha	Russie Mistry	
1979	Baton Baton Mein	Seby Perreira	
1980	Khubsoorat	Jagan Gupta	
1981	Chakra	Benwa	
1981	Kaalia	Boot Polish Boy	
1990	Lonely in America	Arun	
1991	Sam & Me	Nikhil 'Shwartza' Parikh	
1991	Mississippi Masala	Anil	
1993	The Night We Never Met	Cabbie	
1994	It Could Happen to You	Mr. Patel	
1994	Bandit Queen	Shiv Narain	
1994	Camilla	Officer Kapur	
1994	The Mesmerist	Damodar	
1994	Boozecan	Snake	
1995	The Perez Family	Indian immigration official	
1996	Girl 6	Indian Shopkeeper	
1996	Fire	Mundu	
1996	Kama Sutra: A Tale of Love	Babu	
1996-1997	Cosby	Singh	7 episodes
1996	I'm Not Rappaport	Kamir	
1997	His & Hers	Taxi Driver	
1997	NYPD Blue	Raveen	1 episode
1998	To Tired to Die	Cab Driver	
1998	My Own Country	Vadivel	TV Movie
1998	Such a Long Journey	Pavement Artist	
1999	Coming Soon	Afshin	
2000	Falcone	Car Salesman	1 episode
2000	Autumn in New York	Fakir	
2000	King of the Jungle	Mr. Sith	
2002	Third Watch	Baboo	1 episode
2002	Bollywood/Hollywood	Rocky	
2002	Kaante	Det. Constable	
2005	Law and Order Trial by Jury	Anji Reddy	1 episode
2005	Building Girl	Mr. Singh	
2006	Last Holiday	Dr. Gupta	
2006	American Blend	Yogi	
2006	Kettle of Fish	Doorman	
2006	Prison Break	Dr. Marvin Gudat	2 episodes
2006	Hope & a Little Sugar	Ghosh	
2007, 2009	The Office	Vikram	Episodes: "Money" "Dream Team"
2009	Cupid	psychiatrist	1 episode
2009	Bored to Death	Hotel Clerk	1 episode
2009	Today's Special	Regular #1	
2010	God's Land	Raja Chatterjee	
2011	Breakaway	Mr. Patel Senior	
2013	Girls	Doctor	1 episode
2013	Law & Order: Special Victims Unit	Hotel Manager	episode: "Brief Interlude"
2014	On Golden Years	Deva	final role
