= Deven Verma =

Indian actor (1937–2014)

- Born: 23 October 1937; Cutch State, British India
- Died: 2 December 2014 (aged 77); Pune, Maharashtra, India
- Occupation: Actor
- Spouse: Rupa Verma (née Ganguly)

Deven Verma (23 October 1937 – 2 December 2014) was an Indian film and television actor, particularly known for his comic roles, with Bollywood directors like Basu Chatterji, Hrishikesh Mukherjee and Gulzar. He also produced and directed films, including Besharam. He won Filmfare Best Comedian Award for Chori Mera Kaam, Chor Ke Ghar Chor and Angoor.

== Life ==
Verma was born on 23 October 1937 in Kutch, to Baldev Singh Verma and Sarala Devi and was brought up in Pune. His father was Rajasthani and mother belonged to Kutch. His father was a film distributor. He studied at the Nowrosjee Wadia College for Arts and Science (University of Pune) (1953–57), graduating with Honours in Politics and Sociology. He married Rupa Ganguly, daughter of veteran Bollywood actor Ashok Kumar and sister of Preeti Ganguly.

The original name of Deven Verma was Devendu Verma, which he changed to Deven when he was in college. He had four sisters, two of whom were older and two of whom were younger. The two younger sisters were twins. The names of his sisters are Nirupama, Tushar, Amita, and Parul.

Apart from Hindi films, Verma acted in a few Marathi and Bhojpuri films.

He died at 2 a.m IST on 2 December 2014 in Pune, following a heart attack and kidney failure.

== Filmography ==
Year	Title	Role	Notes
1961	Dharmputra	Sudesh Rai	
1963	Gumrah	Pyarelal	
1963	Aaj Aur Kal	Rajkumar Rajendrasingh	
1964	Suhagan	Sukhiram	
1964	Qawwali Ki Raat		
1965	Oonche Log		
1965	Rishte Naate	Raja	
1966	Anupama	Arun	
1966	Mohabbat Zindagi Hai	Advocate Vikram 'Vicky' Sinha	
1966	Devar	Suresh	
1966	Baharen Phir Bhi Aayengi	Vikram Varma	
1967	Milan	Ram Vishwanath Rao	
1968	Aa Jaa Sanam	Dr. Kaushal Verma	
1968	Sunghursh	Nisar	
1969	Yakeen	Guy who found body at the beach	Uncredited
1969	Tamanna		
1970	Khamoshi	Patient No. 22	
1971	Nadaan	Vicky	Uncredited
1971	Mere Apne	Niranjan	
1971	Buddha Mil Gaya	Bhola	
1972	Maalik	Ram Murthy Pandey	
1972	Annadata	Pestonji's client	
1973	Tere Rang Nyare		
1973	Dhund	Banke Lal	
1973	Bada Kabutar	Bhola	
1974	Phir Kab Milogi	Devi Das	
1974	Kora Kagaz	Drona Acharya	
1974	Imtihan		
1974	Do Aankhen		
1974	36 Ghante	Kirpal Singh	
1975	Deewaar	Coolie in song 'Idhar Ka Maal Udhar'	(Song deleted), Uncredited
1975	Chori Mera Kaam	Pravin Chandra Shah	Won 1976 Filmfare Best Comedian Award
1975	Ek Mahal Ho Sapno Ka	Ramu Makhichandani 'Shola'	
1976	Kabhie Kabhie	Rambhajan	Uncredited
1976	Ek Se Badhkar Ek	Constable Ludkuram	
1976	Zindagi	Prabhu	
1976	Ha Khel Sawalyancha	Bhoot Papeshwar Maharaj	
1976	Farrari	Gulab	
1976	Arjun Pandit	Naren	
1977	Mukti	Tony	
1977	Doosra Aadmi	Timsi's Uncle	
1977	Dildaar	Salim	
1977	Chalu Mera Naam	Bawra Singh	
1977	Aadmi Sadak Ka – Dost Asava Tar Asaa	Surendramohan U. Nath 'Suren'	Bilingual film made in Marathi and Hindi
1978	Besharam	Lakshman, his father and mother	
1978	Bhola Bhala	Babu Khan	
1978	Don	Raj Singh's voice	Uncredited
1978	Naukri	Loco	
1978	Anpadh	Bankelal Banarasi	
1978	Priyatama		
1978	Chor Ke Ghar Chor	Pravinbhai	Won 1979 Filmfare Best Comedian Award
1978	Safed Jhooth	Suleiman	
1978	Khatta Meetha	Dara	
1978	Dillagi	Gopal Krishan Choudry	
1978	Chakravyuha		
1979	Chakravyuh		
1978	Atithee	Station Master	
1979	Lok Parlok	Chitragupt Sharma	
1979	Prem Vivah		Guest Appearance
1979	Ghar Ki Laaj	Rajender / Raju	
1979	Amar Deep	Rahim	
1979	Magroor	Tony	
1979	Golmaal	Himself, guest appearance	
1980	Do Premee	Inspector Morari Bhonsle	
1980	Aap Ke Deewane	Butler	
1980	Thodisi Bewafaii	Noor-E-Chasmis	
1980	Jal Mahal	Shankar	
1980	Neeyat	Topi	
1980	Sau Din Saas Ke	Totaram	
1980	Nazrana Pyar Ka	Abdulla	
1980	Judaai	Ram Narayan 'R.N.'	Nominated, 1981 Filmfare Award for Best Performance in a Comic Role
1980	Bombay 405 Miles	Girdharilal Pawa	
1980	Nishana		
1981	Yeh Kaisa Nashaa Hai		
1981	Waqt Ki Deewar	Rajpat	
1981	Ladies Tailor	Asif	
1981	Kudrat	Pyarelal	
1981	Biwi-O-Biwi	Gafoor	
1981	Silsila	Vidyarthi	
1981	Pyaasa Sawan	Shewakram	
1981	Chhupa Chhuppi		
1981	Ahista Ahista	Savitri's husband	
1981	Jyoti	Siyaram	
1981	Josh		
1982	Adhura Aadmi		
1982	Bemisal	Hiralal Tandon	
1982	Angoor	Bahadur, double role	Won 1983 Filmfare Best Comedian Award
1982	Karwat		
1982	Deedar-E-Yaar	Sikander Alam Changezi	
1982	Sumbandh		
1982	Daulat	Murli	
1983	Nastik	Gayaprasad	
1983	Rang Birangi	Ravi Kapoor	
1983	Kaun? Kaisey?	Photographer Nand Dukaan Bandh	
1983	Bandhan Kuchchey Dhaagon Ka	Ratanpal Singh	
1983	Kissi Se Na Kehna	Mansukh	
1984	Main Qatil Hoon		
1984	Aao Jao Ghar Tumhara		
1984	Aaj Kaa M.L.A. Ram Avtar	Digvijay's PA	
1984	Jaag Utha Insan	Devandra Chaturvedi (Deva)	
1985	Saaheb	Pareshaan mama, copycat Bollywood writer	
1985	Pighalta Aasman	Badal - Suraj's friend	
1985	Ulta Seedha	Sapan Kumar	
1985	Yudh	Police Inspector Sawant	
1985	Bhago Bhut Aaya	Munna	
1985	Pyari Behna	Makhan Singh - Tanvi's prospective groom	
1985	Sur Sangam	Advocate Madhav	
1985	Jhoothi	Rasik Lal Sharma	
1985	Alag Alag	Karim	
1985	Oonche Log	Mubarak Ali	
1985	Bhavani Junction	Joseph - Bartender	
1985	Dekha Pyar Tumhara	Lalu Lalwani	
1985	Paisa Yeh Paisa	Sukhiram	
1985	Bond 303	Aslam	
1987	Pyar Ke Kabil	Nandkishore Goverdhan	
1987	Sadak Chhap	Shankar's friend	
1987	Mera Yaar Mera Dushman		
1988	Mardon Wali Baat	Chaila	
1989	Prem Pratigyaa	Hair Oil Salesman / Burglar	
1989	Dana Paani	Pampu	Director and Producer
1989	Bahurani	Kumar Chatterjee	Uncredited
1990	Dil	Police Inspector Ghalib	
1991	Jhoothi Shaan	Krishna's to-be groom	
1992	Deewana	Devdas Sabrangi	
1992	Chamatkar	Inspector P.K. Santh	
1993	King Uncle	Karim, the butler	
1993	Aaja Meri Jaan	Kasturia	Main Negative Role
1993	Ek Hi Raasta	Mehra	
1993	Bedardi	Bhagwandas 'Mamaji'	
1994	Elaan	Head Const. Devkinandan Sharma	
1994	Yeh Dillagi	Gurdas Bannerjee	
1994	Professor Ki Padosan	Pyarelal	
1994	Andaz Apna Apna	Murli Manohar	
1995	Saajan Ki Baahon Mein	Dr. Rastogi	
1995	Hulchul	Vinod bhai	
1995	Gundaraj		
1995	Ram Jaane	Daddu Uncle	
1995	Akele Hum Akele Tum	Kanhaiya	
1996	Tu Chor Main Sipahi	SPO Varma	
1996	Khiladiyon Ka Khiladi		
1997	Udaan	Madhu's Uncle (Mama)	
1997	Dil To Pagal Hai	Ajay's father	
1997	Ishq	Behram	
1998	2001: Do Hazaar Ek	Billu's Uncle (Mama)	
1998	Salaakhen	Giri Rao	
1999	Heeralal Pannalal	Mangalbhai	
2000	Kya Kehna	Rustom	
2002	Mere Yaar Ki Shaadi Hai	Hari Taya	
2002	Sabse Badhkar Kaun		
2003	Calcutta Mail	Reema's grandfather	(final film role)

== Television ==
Year!	Serial	Role	Channel	Notes
1992	Mama Ji		DD National	
1993	Zabaan Sambhalke	Praful Popat Dalal	DD Metro	

=== Producer ===
Year	Title	Notes
1969	Yakeen	
1971	Nadaan	
1978	Besharam	
1983	Chatpati	
1989	Dana Paani	

=== Director ===
Year	Title	Notes
1971	Nadaan	
1973	Bada Kabutar	
1978	Besharam	
1989	Dana Paani	

== Awards ==
Filmfare Best Comedian Award
1976 Chori Mera Kaam – Pravin Chandra Shah
1979 Chor Ke Ghar Chor – Pravinbhai
1983 Angoor – Bahadur
