= Raadha Aur Seeta =

- Directed by: Vijay Kapoor
- Produced by: Tarachand Barjatya
- Music by: Ravindra Jain
- Release date: 10 August 1979
- Running time: 109 minutes
- Country: India
- Language: Hindi

Raadha Aur Seeta is a 1979 Bollywood drama film directed by Vijay Kapoor and produced by Tarachand Barjatya.

== Plot ==
Young Shekhar Verma works in the factory of Raadha's father. Radha falls in love with Shekhar. On the other hand, Shekhar loves Seeta Mathur, who is childhood friend of Raadha. Raadha and Seeta do not divulge their love interest to each other.

== Cast ==
- Arun Govil as Shekhar Verma, hero
- Rita Bhaduri as Raadha Saxena
- Abha Dhulia as Seeta Mathur
- Madan Puri as Shankar Saxena, Raadha's father
- Leela Mishra as Bua (Shankar's sister)
- Pinchoo Kapoor as Raj Bahadur Verma
- Urmila Bhatt as the wife of Raj Bahadur Verma
- Rajendra Nath as Dholuram
- Hari Shivdasani as Dholuram's boss
- Savita Bajaj as College Lecturer
- Jagdeep as Bhagwandas
- Roopesh Kumar as Eve-teaser
- Ritu Kamal as Leela

== Soundtrack ==
The music is by Ravindra Jain. Lyrics also by Ravindra Jain for all the songs.

1. "Man Meet Aur Preet" – Hemlata
2. "Kaun Hai Aisa Jise Phulo Se" – Hemlata, Yesudas
3. "Log Aise Bhi Zamane Me" – Ravindra Jain
4. "Man Ki Baat Jab Hotho Pe" – Hemlata
5. "Man Ki Baat Jab Hotho Pe" (Duet) – Hemlata, Suresh Wadkar
6. "Man Meet Aur Preet Milte Hai" (Part 2) – Hemlata, Dilraj Kaur
7. "Man Meet Aur Preet Milte Hai" (Part 3) – Hemlata
