= Hungama Bombay Ishtyle =

1978 Hindi film directed by Siraj Ayesha Sayani

- Directed by: Siraj Ayesha Sayani
- Written by: Hriday Lani (Dialogues)
- Produced by: Pearl Padamsee; Siraj Ayesha Sayani
- Starring: Amrish Puri; Naseeruddin Shah; Mohan Agashe; Pearl Padamsee
- Cinematography: B.V. Karanth
- Release date: 2 February 1978
- Running time: 103 minutes
- Country: India
- Language: Hindi

Hungama Bombay Ishtyle (transl. Ruckus in Bombay style) is a 1978 Indian Hindi-language black and white film directed by Siraj Ayesha Sayani who co-produced it with Pearl Padamsee. It stars Amrish Puri and Naseeruddin Shah; relatively unknown actors who later on became well-known in the Indian entertainment industry. Padamsee herself played the antagonist with Keith Stevenson. The film has reportedly been digitally remastered.

== Plot ==
Mani, the daughter of a rich businessman, becomes friends with street children and goes around town having fun with them. Mani's family is trying to locate her through constable Sakharam who in turn relies on his dog Tiger. Meanwhile, villain Aunty and her sidekick Bundledas plan to kidnap Mani but are overheard by Jaggu. During this, the street children keep Mani hidden and protect her.

== Cast ==
- Mohan Agashe
- Pearl Padamsee
- Amrish Puri
- Naseeruddin Shah
- Dilip Chandiwalo
- Mohan Gokhale
- Keith Stevenson
