= Aadmi Sadak Ka =

- Directed by: Devendra Goel
- Written by: Mushtaq Jalili
- Produced by: Devendra Goel
- Starring: Shatrughan Sinha; Asit Sen; Zaheera; Sujit Kumar; Deven Verma
- Cinematography: Keki Mistry
- Edited by: R. V. Shrikhande
- Music by: Ravi
- Release date: 1977
- Country: India
- Language: Hindi

Aadmi Sadak Ka is a 1977 Bollywood drama film produced and directed by Devendra Goel, it stars Shatrughan Sinha, Zaheera, Sujit Kumar, Deven Verma, Asit Sen and Agha. The film's music is by Ravi.

== Plot ==
The Nath family consists of retired Commissioner Upendra, his wife, Savitri; elder son, Madan, who is married to Maya, and they have a son, Ashoo; a second son, Surendra, who is married to Kamla, and they have a daughter, Pinky; a third unmarried college-going son, Chander; and a school-going daughter, Namrata. They are a happy family, and everyone rejoices when Chander completes his M.A. There is more reason to celebrate when Chander introduces them to the woman he loves, Vandana, the only daughter of wealthy Mr. Tandon. The marriage is arranged with a ceremony, attended by the family friend, Abdul, who home-delivers groceries.

However, before the marriage can be sealed, Upendra receives news that he has lost his court case, and dies. The wedding is canceled, and the lives of the entire Nath family change thereafter, with Kamla and Maya taking over the household, reducing Savitri to the status of an unwanted guest, while Namrata is asked to become the servant and is unable to complete her education, and Chander, who rebels, is asked to leave. Vandana's father learns of their plight and refuses to permit his daughter to marry into the Nath family. Chander moves in with Abdul, gets a job as a waiter, then he is promoted to manager, and finally as partner and co-owner of the Francis Hotel. Unable to get medication, Savitri dies, forcing Namrata to move in with Abdul as well. Madan and Surendra also find success when they buy their own hotel and name it the Gulmohar Hotel. With Chander on one hand, and his two siblings on the other now poised to compete against each other, they set out to destroy each other.

== Cast ==
- Shatrughan Sinha as Abdul
- Vikram as Chandramohan "Chander"
- Zaheera as Vandana Tandon
- Sujit Kumar as Madanmohan "Madan"
- Deven Verma as Surendramohan "Suren"
- Asit Sen as Kundanlal
- David as Rustam
- Agha as Bus Driver (Gulmohar Hotel)
- Mumtaz Begum as Abdul's mother
- Gajanan Jagirdar as Retired Police Commissioner Upendranath
- Pinchoo Kapoor as Mr. Tandon

== Soundtrack ==
The music was composed by Ravi and the lyrics were written by Verma Malik.

| Song | Singer |
|---|---|
| "Aadmi Sadak Ka" (Part 1) | Mohammed Rafi |
| "Aadmi Sadak Ka" (Part 2) | Mohammed Rafi |
| "Aaj Mere Yaar Ki Shaadi Hai" | Mohammed Rafi |
| "Bura Na Maano Yaar Dosti Yaari Mein" | Mohammed Rafi, Anuradha Paudwal |
| "Basti Basti, Nagri Nagri, Keh Do Gaon Gaon Mein" | Mohammed Rafi, Asha Bhosle |
