= Deen K. Chatterjee =

American philosopher

Deen Chatterjee

Education
- Education: University of Washington (PhD)

Philosophical work
- Era: 21st-century philosophy
- Region: Western philosophy
- Institutions: Oxford University, S.J. Quinney College of Law
- Main interests: Global Justice
- Website: https://www.deenchatterjee.com/

Deen Chatterjee is an American philosopher and a faculty affiliate at Oxford Consortium for Human Rights at the Institute for Ethics, Law, and Armed Conflict at Oxford University. Previously he was a Senior Fellow in the S.J. Quinney College of Law at the University of Utah. Chatterjee is known for his works on ethics.

== Books ==
- The Ethics of Preventive War (Cambridge University Press, 2013)
- Democracy in a Global World: Human Rights and Political Participation in the 21st Century (Rowman and Littlefield, 2008)
- The Ethics of Assistance: Morality and the Distant Needy (Cambridge University Press, 2004)
- Ethics and Foreign Intervention, with Don E. Scheid (Cambridge University Press, 2003)
