= Naukri =

- Directed by: Hrishikesh Mukherjee
- Written by: Biren Tripathy (dialogue)
- Screenplay by: Bimal Dutta
- Story by: Salil Chowdhury
- Produced by: Jayendra Pandya; Rajaram Pandya; Satish Wagle; R.S.J. Productions
- Starring: Raj Kapoor; Rajesh Khanna
- Cinematography: Jaywant Pathare
- Edited by: Subhash Gupta; Khan Zaman Khan
- Music by: Songs: R. D. Burman; Score: Salil Chowdhury
- Release date: 9 June 1978
- Running time: Super Cassettes Industries Limited (T-Series)
- Country: India
- Language: Hindi

Naukri (lit. 'Job') is a 1978 Bollywood film directed by Hrishikesh Mukherjee. It was critically acclaimed and became an unexpected flop at the box office. However over the years, the film has been appreciated by the audiences in its screening in television and has gained a cult following over the years. Raj Kapoor and Rajesh Khanna starred in this movie, set in 1944–1947.

Naukri's basic idea is based on the 1955 Tamil film Mudhal Thethi, starring Sivaji Ganeshan and Anjali Devi. The other inspiration for this film was It's a Wonderful Life, produced and directed by Frank Capra. The story features a person getting help of an angel after his death. However, the story and treatment in this film are completely different form both of these films. The God-sent person makes the hero realize that when he was alive he was so important and loved by all around him but he couldn’t recognize it. Rajesh Khanna plays the man who meets the angel Raj Kapoor, after he commits suicide.

The film was not well publicized before its release and being released at a time when multi-star films ruled the roost, this classic was a box office failure. However, over the years it has been appreciated by audiences. In the Bollywood Guide Collections, critics gave the film 4 stars of 5.

The idea of an angel helping a dead person in realizing his significance on earth was also adopted in the 2005 film Vaah! Life Ho Toh Aisi!, in which Shahid Kapoor and Sanjay Dutt play respective roles of Rajesh Khanna and Raj Kapoor, with Dutt playing a modern Yamraj. The musical score was composed by Salil Chowdhury while the songs were composed by R. D. Burman

== Plot ==
The film opens up with a distraught, tense Ranjit watching his mother and his sister and their adopted brother closely. He is wearing a depressing look as he cannot earn and feed his family members properly being a handicapped person. He walks with help of walking stick. He decides that it is better to commit suicide and die rather than giving trouble to others and also seeing his family members struggle for survival. His mother loves him a lot although he is limping and jobless. She asks him not to worry and be happy. Their landlord has asked them to vacate the premises the next day. Tension looming around his mind, Ranjit decides to go out early in the morning and jump from the bridge above the railway tracks and give away his life. Ranjit carries out his plan. In the next scenes, he starts walking without help from any stick. He meets a man who calls himself as Captain and he says that he is the only person who can see Ranjith right now. That man introduces himself as Swaraj Singh Captain and says that he is a ghost and that Ranjit has died and is now a ghost too. Captain takes him along everywhere and shows him how many other people are roaming as ghosts in the world after committing suicide. Captain says the ghosts attain salvation only when their unfulfilled wish gets fulfilled. Captain asks him why did he commit suicide. Ranjit tells him his story of how he was a badminton player and how rich they were. He had even fell in love with a richer girl. The rest of the story is about Ranjit's description of what drove him to poverty, how were they were surviving, how his friends betrayed him and deprived him of any job, how he lost his leg and how much he feels betrayed by his girlfriend leaving him and joining with someone else. Captain just keeps listening to his story. The answers to the above question and the rest of the story are full of suspense.

== Reception ==
It received four in the Bollywood guide Collections. The film grossed 2,70,00,000 at the box office in 1978 and thereby became a surprise flop. The film was praised by the critics at the time of its release and has developed a cult following over the years among audiences.

== Cast ==
- Raj Kapoor - Swaraj Singh 'Captain'
- Rajesh Khanna - Ranjit Gupta 'Ronu'
- Zaheera - Ramola
- Nadira - Lily
- A. K. Hangal - Ranjit's Father
- Pratima Devi - Ranjit's Mother
- Tom Alter - Mr. Anderson
- Deven Varma - Loco
- Jayshree T. - Mary
- Meena Roy - Meena
- Aarti - Rekha
- Master Akbar - Raja
- V. Gopal - Landlord
- Vijay Sharma - Sanjay
- Lalita Kumari - Chandrabadani
- Keshto Mukherjee - Hawaldar
- Om Shivpuri - Mr. Rai, Ramola's Father
- Yunus Parvez - Rasik Lal
- Ayathoda
- Satya Babu
- Muni Raj
- Amal Sen
- Shubhra Nath
- Habiba Rehman
- Anju Gupta
- Jalil
- Siddharth Narayan
- Padma Khanna - Firoza Bai(Courtesan)

== Crew ==
- Director - Hrishikesh Mukherjee
- Story - Salil Chowdhury
- Screenplay - Bimal Dutta
- Dialogue - Biren Tripathy
- Producer - Jayendra Pandya, Rajaram Pandya, Satish Wagle
- Production company - R. S. J. Productions
- Editor - Subhash Gupta, Khan Zaman Khan
- Cinematographer - Jaywant Pathare
- Art director - Ajit Banerjee
- Music director - Rahul Dev Burman
- Background Score Composer - Salil Chowdhury
- Lyricist - Anand Bakshi
- Playback singers - Asha Bhosle, Manna Dey, Mukesh, Kishore Kumar, Lata Mangeshkar

== Soundtrack ==
Song	Singers	Time
"Duniya Mein Jeene Ka Mujhe Shaukh Tha"	Kishore Kumar, Manna Dey	3:40
"Main Ne Tumko Piya Keh Diya"	Lata Mangeshkar	3:10
"Teri Duhai Harjaayee"	Asha Bhosle	3:25
"Upar Jaake Yaad Aayi Neeche Ki Baatein"	Mukesh	3:20
