= Aahuti (1978 film) =

1978 Indian Hindi film

- Directed by: Ashok V. Bhushan
- Produced by: Ramchand Bashomal; Reeta Shah; R. Soni
- Starring: Rajendra Kumar; Shashi Kapoor; Rakesh Roshan; Parveen Babi; Zaheera; Asha Sachdev
- Music by: Laxmikant-Pyarelal
- Release date: 28 April 1978
- Country: India
- Language: Hindi

Aahuti is a 1978 Hindi family drama film directed by Ashok V. Bhushan. The films stars Rajendra Kumar, Shashi Kapoor, Rakesh Roshan, Parveen Babi, Zaheera and Madan Puri.

== Plot ==
The story unfolds with Custom Officer Harnam Prasad (Ajit) as apprehending a smuggling racket being run on the high seas by Heeralal (Madan Puri), wherein Heeralal is seen by two fisher women, one of whom he kills so that she is not able to testify against him, which is seen by Harnam. On Harnam's testimony in the courts as eyewitness to both the smuggling racket and murder of the fisher woman, Heeralal is jailed. Heeralal's gang now seeks revenge against the family of devout Harnam which comprises his wife, Kaushalya (Kamini Kaushal) and three sons. They sabotage the picnic bus of his two sons, Ram and Laxman, leading it to being thrown off a cliff and burnt, wherein people assume both to be dead. Harnam is attacked on his boat in the sea, with his third son Bharat, by the same gang's assailant, which leads to the boat crashing on the rocks, and both being assumed, to be missing or dead. Kaushalya is attacked by this gang with kerosene fire which burns down their house and she loses both her legs in the inferno. Having lost her family to her husband's duty she goes to commit suicide, but is saved by a woman (Dulari) who takes her to her humble abode.

Ram Prasad (Rajendra Kumar) grows up to be as a CID Inspector and Laxman Prasad (Shashi Kapoor) as worker in a factory which manufactures Lead Safety Containers for Uranium, for the Government of India, also called Lead shielding; which he also protects from landing in the hands of terrorists who make bombs and thus one of the chief workers, in the good books of the owner (Raj Mehra). Bharat Prasad (Rakesh Roshan) is however waylaid and is a criminal fisherman working for Heeralal now released from jail. His accomplice is Poonam Asha Sachdev, who is none other than the daughter of the fisher woman who was killed by Heeralal for her testimony against him.

Heeralal is now into criminal smuggling of both gold and Uranium and wants to clandestinely acquire the Lead Safety Containers from Raj Mehra's factory. Ram Prasad posing as Rocky joins their gang as he wants to apprehend the uranium smugglers. Both Rocky and Bharat Prasad, who is named Badshah by the gang, are however chased by the police and they land in Laxman Prasad's house to whom they introduce themselves as factory workers, to cheat him into joining their nefarious plan of stealing the lead boxes.

The story then leads to how Laxman Prasad is wrongly framed for the theft of the boxes by Rocky and Badshah and the subsequent murder of Raj Mehra. Kusum (Zaheera), who is the only daughter of Raj Mehra is pursued by Ram Prasad so that he can steal the lead boxes, but they fall in love. Laxman Prasad is saved from the police by Rekha (Parveen Babi), who is a fellow worker and his love interest. As the plot gets thicker Ram Prasad also reveals his true identity to Laxman Prasad, but not before a fight in which they discover they are brothers by the tattoos on their hands.

Harnam, who has now become a CBI Officer, poses as a sea pirate and joins the gang of Heeralal to transport the uranium in the stolen lead boxes, in a ship. Kaushalya and Laxman Prasad, who had previously reunited when Laxman Prasad was escaping from the police on false charges, are however held hostage on the same ship. After a scuffle on the high seas in the ship, the family of Harnam Prasad is united by the tattoos of their names on their hands and symbol of Om. Mac (Pradeep Kumar) is another gangster in league with international criminals and Heeralal, out to misuse uranium against India. The movie ends with the family of Harnam Prasad vanquishing the entire gang of smugglers, being true to their legacy of honesty towards their country, and matrimony of the three sons to their love interests.

== Cast ==
- Rajendra Kumar as CID Inspector Ram Prasad / Rocky
- Shashi Kapoor as Laxman Prasad
- Rakesh Roshan as Bharat Prasad / Badshah
- Parveen Babi as Rekha
- Zaheera as Kusum
- Asha Sachdev as Poonam
- Madan Puri as Heeralal
- Ajit Khan as Custom Officer / CBI Officer Harnam Prasad
- Kamini Kaushal as Kaushalya Prasad
- Pradeep Kumar as Mac
- Dulari Kaushalya's Neighbour
- Raj Mehra as Kusam's Father
- Birbal Laxman's friend
- Preeti Ganguli Pritam's Girlfriend
- Krishan Dhawan CID Chief Mansoor Ali

The song "Sathie Mere Sathi Rut Aa Tee Jaate", by Mohd. Rafi, Mukesh and Lata Mangeshkar was the most popular among the songs. The playback singers for the movie were Mohd. Rafi, Kishore Kumar, Mukesh, Manhar, Mahendra Kapoor and Anuradha Paudwal, The music was by Laxmikant Pyarelal and Lyrics by Anand Bakshi.

== Songs ==
1. "Kaash Aisa Hota Kaash Aisa Hota" - Kishore Kumar, Lata Mangeshkar
2. "Naukari Sau Ki Hazaar Ki Kimat Nahin Hoti Pyaar Ki" - Kishore Kumar, Anuradha Paudwal
3. "Bharat Ka Bhai Lachhman Lachhman Ka Bhai Raam" - Kishore Kumar, Mahendra Kapoor, Manhar Udhas
4. "Is Duniya Mein Kaun Sanwaare Sab Ke Bigade Kaam" - Mahendra Kapoor, Anuradha Paudwal
5. "Jugani Ek Ladki Ka Naam Hai" - Lata Mangeshkar
6. "Saathi Mere Saathi Rut Aati JaatiKahe Teri Meri Kahaani" - Mohammed Rafi, Mukesh, Lata Mangeshkar
