= Vidya Singh =

Athlete

Personal details
- Born: 11 September 1952 (age 74)
- Parent: Maharajkumar Vishweshwar Gajapathi Raju

Vidya Gajapathi Raju Singh is an athlete, philanthropist, entrepreneur, rotarian, fitness enthusiast and columnist. She is the oldest Indian woman to climb Mount Kilimanjaro, at age 72.

She serves as president of Soroptimist International Chennai Downtown. She served as president of the International Women's Association.

She is the daughter of Maharaj Kumar Vishweswar Gajapathi Raju of Vizianagaram Estates.
