= Ganguly family =

Influential family in Indian cinema

The Ganguly brothers – Anoop Kumar, Ashok Kumar and Kishore Kumar (left to right) – with their mother

The Ganguly family is an Indian show business family active in Hindi cinema (Bollywood). It originates from the Ganguly brothers: Ashok Kumar, Anoop Kumar and Kishore Kumar.

In a film industry dominated by familial connections the Ganguly brothers served as an important bridge between various Bollywood film clans.

== Background ==
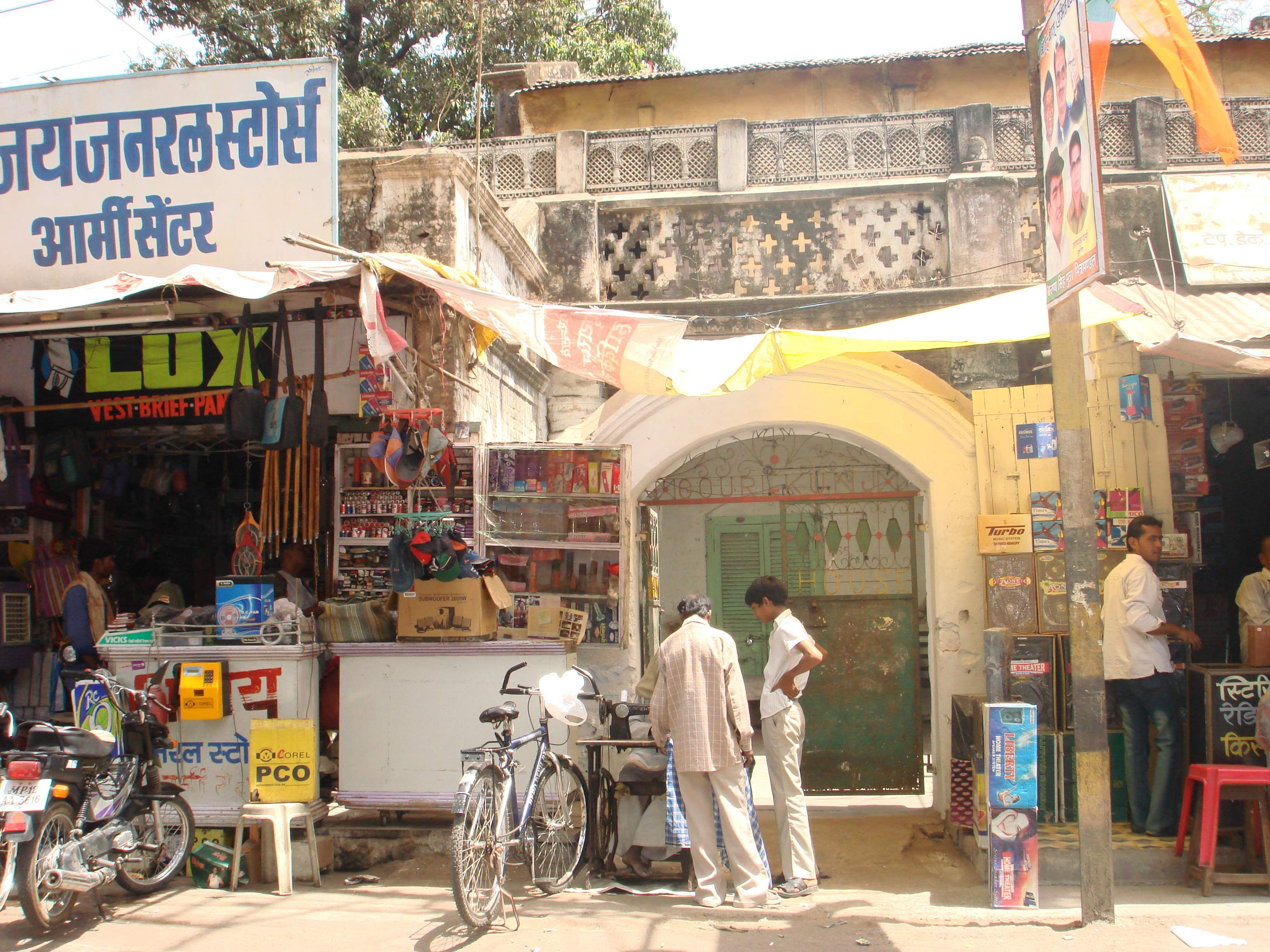
Ganguli House (Gauri Kunj) ancestral home of the Ganguli family in Khandwa.

The Ganguly family are a family of film personalities active in the Hindi film industry. The family comprises the descendants of three brothers - Ashok Kumar Ganguly, Anoop Kumar Ganguly and Abhas 'Kishore' Kumar Ganguly - and their sister Sati Rani Mukherjee.

The history of the Ganguly family begins with Kunjalal Ganguly, an advocate by profession coming from a long line of lawyers from Bikrampur, Dhaka district, Eastern Bengal region (now Bangladesh) and who had settled in Khandwa, and his wife Gouri Rani Devi, the grand-daughter of Raja Shibchandra Banerjee and sister of classical singer Dhananjay Banerjee. The celebrated brothers and their sister, who gave birth to the Mukherjee's of Bollywood, were born to these two. Supposedly, Kishore Kumar inherited his sense of comedy from Kunjalal. Also, the most popular film featuring all three Ganguly brothers – Chalti Ka Naam Gaadi – was, supposedly, inspired by Kunjalal's Chrysler that he bought in 1928, a year before the birth of his youngest son.

If Rattan Bai from their extended family network is ignored, Ashok Kumar was the first person in the family to go into the film industry. His daughter Preeti Ganguly, son-in-law Deven Verma (married to his elder daughter Rupa Verma (nee Ganguly)) and granddaughter Anuradha Patel also became accomplished actors. Ashok Kumar's son Aroop Kumar Ganguly never joined the film industry.

== Kishore Kumar ==
Kishore Kumar was married to Ruma Guha Thakurta (1950–58), Madhubala (1960–69), Yogeeta Bali (1975–78) and Leena Chandavarkar (1980–87).

Ruma and Kishore were divorced in 1958, and Ruma later remarried. Ruma (now, Ruma Guha Thakurta) was the daughter of Satyen Ghosh (better known as Montey Ghosh) and a niece to Smt. Bijoya Roy, the wife of the legendary film director Satyajit Ray (son of writer Sukumar Ray and grandson of writer and publisher Upendrakishore Raychowdhury). Her mother Sati Devi, a talented singer, was the elder sister of Bijoya, the legendary director's wife. Amit Kumar, her son with Kishore Kumar eventually became a celebrity in his own right. Amit later sang duets with Krishna Mukherjee, a niece to his paternal aunt Satirani.

His second wife Madhubala (Mumtaz Jehan Begum Dehlavi) was a Hindi film actress and daughter of Ataullah Khan. She was blamed by his family for the breakup with the first wife. Madhubala was often sick and died on 23 February 1969 at an early age.

Yogeeta was a niece to Geeta Bali, who in turn was Shammi Kapoor's first wife. Yogeeta eventually divorced Kishore Kumar and married Mithun Chakravorty.

Kishore's second son Sumeet Kumar was born to Leena and is also a singer. Ruma later married Arup Guha Thakurta and had a son, Ayan, and a daughter, Sromana, with him.

== Sati Devi ==
The only sister of the famous Ganguly brothers, Sati Devi, was married to Sashadhar Mukherjee of the Mukherjee-Samarth family. She gave birth to director and composer Rono Mukherjee (father of actress Sharbani Mukherjee), actors Joy Mukherjee and Deb Mukherjee (father of director Ayan Mukerji), directors and producers Shomu Mukherjee (husband of actress Tanuja and father of actresses Kajol and Tanishaa) and Shubhir Mukherjee, and Shibani Mukherjee. Kajol, in turn, is married to actor Ajay Devgan, the son of action choreographer Veeru Devgan.
