= Shamji v Johnson Matthey Bankers Ltd =

UK bankruptcy hearing

- Court: Court of Appeal
- Citation: [1991] BCLC 36

Case history
- Prior action: [1986] BCLC 278

Keywords
- Administration

Shamji v Johnson Matthey Bankers Ltd [1991] BCLC 36 is a UK insolvency law case concerning the administration procedure when a company is unable to repay its debts.

== Facts ==
Abdul Shamji controlled a group of companies. They were in debt to JMB who had mortgages and guarantees. JMB wanted payment. The bank agreed to release the debt if Shamji paid £14m within 21 days and this could be extended by 14 days if the bank viewed negotiations as proceeding properly. Six days after the 21-day period, JMB appointed receivers. Shamji and the companies went to court for an injunction, arguing the bank had breached the contract. They argued there was a duty on JMB as mortgagee, when appointing a receiver, to consider relevant matters including the effect of an appointment on refinancing negotiations.

== Judgment ==
=== High Court ===
Hoffmann J dismissed the appeal. He said the bank was entitled contractually to appoint receivers. It owed no duty of care when doing so to any mortgagor or guarantor. It was protecting its interests and could not be challenged.

=== Court of Appeal ===
Oliver LJ affirmed the decision of Hoffmann J. Nourse LJ agreed.

== See also ==
- UK insolvency law
