= Pearl Padamsee =

Indian actress

- Padamsee in 1979
- Died: 23 April 2000 (aged 68-69) (Note: India Today reported that "she died of a cardiac arrest, at the age of 69, in Mumbai", while Tribune India wrote, "She was 68."); Mumbai, Maharashtra, India
- Occupations: Actor; theatre director-producer

Pearl Padamsee (1931 – 23 April 2000) was an Indian theatre personality as a stage actress, director and producer of English language theatre in Mumbai active in 1950s–1990s. She acted in a few Hindi and English language films, including Khatta Meetha, Junoon, Baaton Baaton Mein, Kama Sutra: A Tale of Love, and Such a Long Journey. She ran after-school theatre workshops for children.

== Professional life and personal vita ==
Padamsee was born to a Punjabi Christian father and a Baghdadi Jew mother. According to her second husband, Alyque Padamsee, "She was the secretary of the college's Dramatic Club at St. Xavier's College, Mumbai in the 1950s" and "went to study anthropology in Australia."

Her first husband's surname was Chowdhry. They had two children: a son named Ranjit Chowdhry who was an actor and a daughter named Rohini Chowdhry. The marriage ended in divorce when her children were still toddlers.

Pearl became a part of a theatre group, promoting "English theatre" in Mumbai. She reproduced successful Broadway productions using local Indian talent. She directed, acted and produced for the stage, schools and organizations.

Pearl then married Alyque Padamsee who was also active in English theatre.

With Alyque Padamsee, Pearl had a daughter, Raell Padamsee, who runs her own theatre company in Mumbai. Pearl and Alyque were divorced very shortly after the birth of Raell.

Pearl Padamsee died on 23 April 2000. She is buried at a Christian cemetery in Bandra.

== Work ==
=== Stage ===
- 1966: The Boy Who Wouldn't Play Jesus (director)
- 1985: Brighton Beach Memoirs (director)

=== Selected filmography ===
Year	Title	Role	Notes
1978	Hungama Bombay Ishtyle	Aunty	Also producer
1978	Khatta Meetha	Nargis Sethna	
1979	Baton Baton Mein	Rosie Perreira	
1979	Junoon	Akhtarbee	Guest appearance
1984	Party	Ruth	
1988	The Perfect Murder	Nurse	
1998	Such a Long Journey	Mrs. Kutpitia	
