= Ankh Ka Tara =

1978 film

- Film poster
- Directed by: Shantilal Soni
- Music by: C. Arjun
- Release date: 1978
- Country: India
- Language: Hindi

Ankh Ka Tara is a 1977 Bollywood film directed by Shantilal Soni.

== Cast ==
- Sachin as Makhan / Mohan
- Bindiya Goswami as Geeta Gupta
- Ajit as Ramlal
- Bharat Bhushan
- Bindu as Shalu
- Dulari as Rukmani
- Preeti Ganguli as Govind's daughter
- Mukri as Govind
- Paintal as Amar
- Nirupa Roy as Parvati
- Om Shivpuri as Ashok Gupta (as Om Shiv Puri)
- Tun Tun

== Music ==
The music was composed by C. Arjun.
