= Sitaramdas Omkarnath =

Indian ascetic and guru

Sri Sri Thakur Sitaramdas Omkarnath

Personal life
- Born: Probodh Chandra Chattopadhya; 17 February 1892 Keota village, Hooghly district, Bengal Presidency, British India
- Died: 6 December 1982 (aged 90) Damurdaha village, Hooghly district, West Bengal, India
- Honors: Namavatar

Religious life
- Religion: Hinduism
- Founder of: Jaiguru Sampradaya
- Philosophy: Bhakti yoga

Religious career
- Teacher: Dasarathidev Yogeswar of Digsui Village

Quotation

Faith in the divine Name is not blind faith. Call Him howsoever you will, call Him, standing, sitting, eating, going to bed - peace shall be yours.

Sitaramdas Omkarnath (17 February 1892 – 6 December 1982) was an Indian saint and spiritual master from Bengal. Addressed as Sri Sri Thakur Sitaramdas Omkarnath, where "Omkar" signifies the cosmic enlightenment and attaining supreme consciousness, he was regarded by his followers as the Avatar (divine incarnate) of the Kali Yuga.

His central teaching was the beneficence of the divine chanting (nāma) of the Hare Krishna mantra, regarded as the "Tarak Brahma Naam" (the chant of soul deliverance) in the Kali Yuga with the power to deliver liberation from the cycle of birth and death.

His disciples worship him as an incarnation of God himself and regard him as a source of spiritual enlightenment and soul succour to seekers because his life is thought to have been predicted in a manuscript of Achyutananda Dasa.

Sitaramdas Omkarnath wrote more than 150 books to promote the essence of Indian scriptures, built more than 60 temples and ashrams all across India, and founded a spiritual organisation, Akhil Bharat Jaiguru Sampradaya, which established many groups, temples and mathas. He was also the initiator of multiple magazines, including Pather Alo, Devjan, JaiGuru, Arya Nari, Paramananda, and The Mother.

== Birth and childhood ==
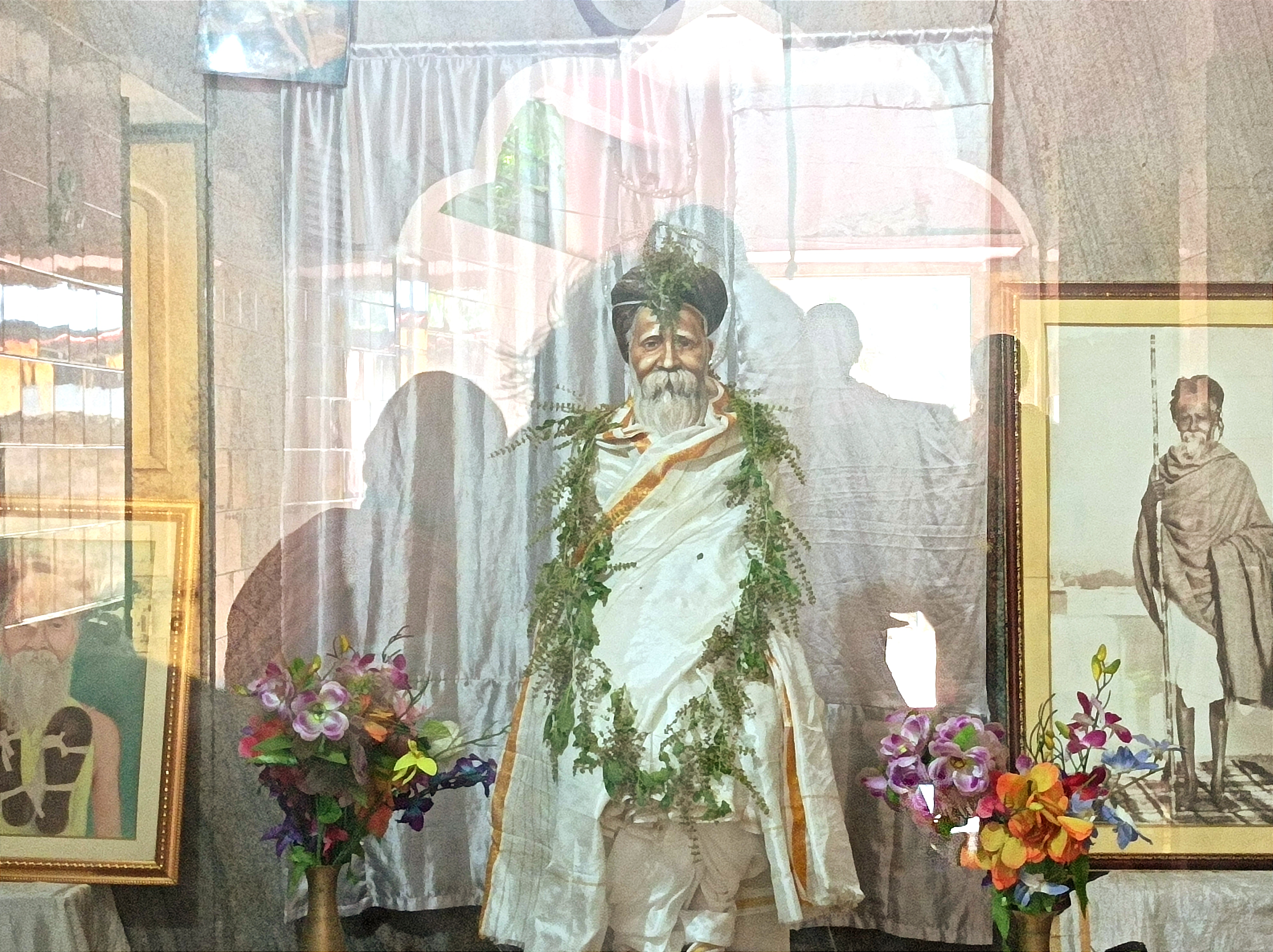
Birth Place of Sri Sri Sitaramdas Omkarnath

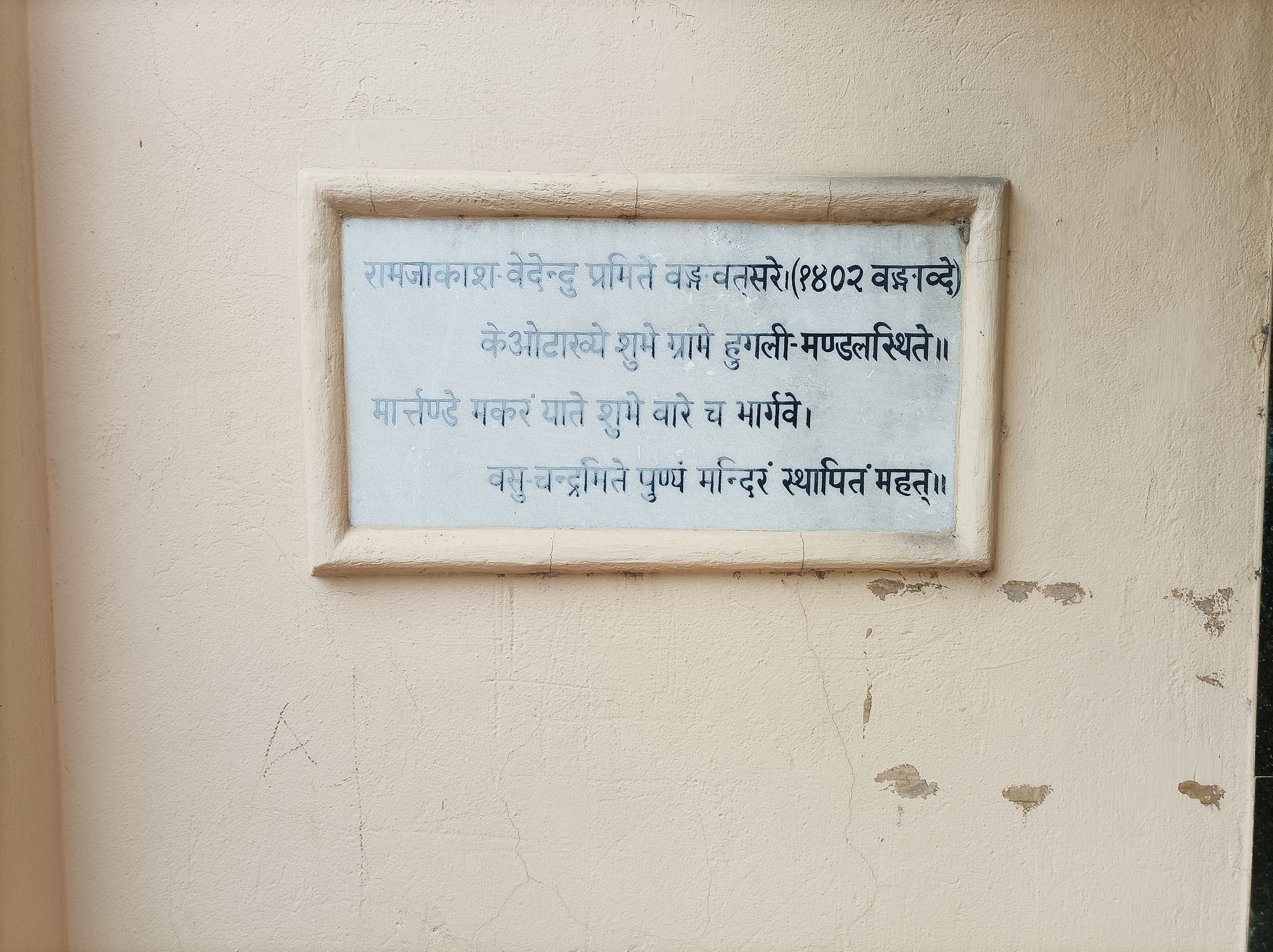
The inscriptions in Sanskrit on the wall convey the birth of Sri Sri Sitaramdas Omkarnath

Sri Sri Sitaramdas Omkarnath was born at his maternal uncle's house located in remote Keota village under Hooghly district, West Bengal, at 8:01 AM on the 6th waning lunar day, of Hindu month Falgun circa 1892. English Calendar DOB 17 February 1892.

His name consecrated at birth was Prabodh Chandra Chattopadhyay, and his birth parents were Pranhari Chattopadhyay and Mallyabati Devi. Father Pranhari was a Brahmin and worked as a village physician in Dumurdaha, Hooghly district. A childhood incidence came to be known about him once he attained his spiritual supremacy. Once as a young child, (then Prabodh Chandra Chattopadhyay) he was listening to the mahamantra HareKrishna Nama Sankirtan, and he attained "Samadhi" (spiritual communion state in altered consciousness) during the Kirtan. But as assumed by local villagers, he was thought to have fainted. However an ascetic present at the venue, told his grandmother that he has not fainted but attained samadhi. If Ganges water is sprayed on him and lord Rama's name is sung to him, he will recover from samadhi and he resumed his normal conscious state. The kuladevata (family deity) was Brajanath (Krishna).

In 1896, his birth mother Mallyabati Devi died, leaving infant Prabodh, then four years old, in the care of his extended family. Father Pranhari remarried a much younger Giribala Devi, aged 10 to 11 years at that time; who went on to dedicate her life till death, at the service of this family and raising her foster children as her own, Prabodh being the youngest. Pranhari died in 1912.

== Education ==
Omkarnath attended a village school but then determined that Dasarathidev Yogeswar of Digsui village should be his guru.Though he was admitted to the Bandel Church School to pursue Western Education, he left that school for his interest in Indian Sankritised Education system. Thereafter, he studied at Yogeswar's house, where he undertook daily chores as well as spiritual education. In 1918, Probodh was meditating at about midnight when he visualised the god Shiva along with the Durga, the Divine Mother.

Later, Omkarnath saw his previous birth on the day of Saraswati puja. Through this he came to believe that he was a worshipper of the goddess Kali in his previous life.

== Spiritual quest ==
Guru Dasarathidev had named him Sitaram, the name Omkarnath was a divine revelation which was later conferred by Swami Dhruvananda Giri. Thus, Probodh came to be known as Sitaramdas Omkarnath. He had heard the Hare Krishna MahaMantra as a divine sound during his meditation in a cave at Ramashram, Dumurdaha, Hooghly. Later, he heard a divine voice say "O Sage, dive in". Still Sitaram was not ready for giving spiritual initiation to masses, and he waited for direct command. At Puri, Orissa, Sitaram visualised Jagannath in a halo and Jagannath gave the instruction — "Go, Go, Go and give the Name". Thereafter, Sitaram started spreading the Lord's name on a mass scale.

== As a preacher/guru ==
After getting what is believed to be the Divine instruction, Omkarnath began to preach Nam (Lord's name) across India. Temples were established and renovated, the poor were fed, clothes were distributed, help was given to the fathers of marriageable daughters, taking on the responsibility of lifetime maintenance of hundreds of poverty-stricken families, establishment of free schools for poor students, setting up 29 Akhanda Naam Kirtan centres across India, establishing temples and ashrams, and several other activities of the kind went on continuously. Though he was a follower of both Ramanuj and Ramanandi sect, he developed a philosophical school named "Avinava Pranab-vad"

Large number of men and women took spiritual initiation from Sitaram. His reputation spread and people gathered in large numbers wherever he resided. Sitaram was respected by contemporaries such as Anandamayi Ma, Mohanananda Brahmachari, Dalai Lama, Vilayat Inayat Khan, Swami Chidananda, Jain Muni Sushil Kumar and others. He was believed to be an incarnation of Lord Sri Ramachandra, and is one of the spiritually powerful and sound people that existed in human history. He is also one of the pure people who have existed.

== Teachings ==
Sitaramdas Omkarnath's spiritual philosophy includes Bhakti, Jnana, Karma Yoga, Kriya Yoga and segments of ancient Indian religion, with focus on Nam [Lord's Name]. Sitaramdas did not encourage conversion, but guided seekers on the path of their respective religion. He stated, "The paths may differ, but HE is not different". By holding onto the name of Lord, and by performing the duties prescribed by religion of oneself, everybody can attain the supreme truth.

According to Omkarnath,

Nama meant Nama of God; Rama, Krishna, Shiva, Durga; but Nama had to be repeated constantly. Nama could reach the Sadhaka to Nada and Jyoti (Divine Sounds and Lights); ...and ultimately Name could bring Onkar, the Anahat sound one could hear inside. So what the Rishis of the old days could not gain even after hundreds of years of Tapasya in jungles, Nama could achieve even when a person lived his normal life and did his every day work.

The teachings of Omkarnath are derived from his personal experiences, revealed in the course of continual spiritual practice. His teachings were compiled by Kinkar Omananda (alias Madhav Swamiji), one of his close monastic disciples.

== Miracles ==
Many of unexplained incidents associated with Omkarnath have been documented in books and newspapers by prominent personalities. Among these are:

- The writer Nabaneeta Dev Sen wrote of a 'medical miracle' she had seen. Her father, Naren Dev, was in coma for several days but when Omkarnath came and touched him, he opened his eyes and talked and within a week had begun walking.
- Many newspapers of Kolkata reported a revival from death at a Calcutta Medical College. Padmalochan Mukerjee was declared dead, Omkarnath arrived, touched him and revived him in front of Sister G. Wood, who was overwhelmed by the incident.
- General Sujan Singh Uban described that Omkarnath had foreseen the Indo-Pakistan war of December 1971 and that during the war a supernatural power of Omkarnath had given him an extraordinary victory. Besides the national issues, Uban had felt the powers of Omkarnath in many aspects of his personal life.

== Death ==
Sri Sri SitaRam Das Onkarnath attained "Mahasamadhi" in the early hours of 6 December 1982. His mortal "SriVigraha" was placed at his first established ashram Sri Ramashram, Dumurdaha, so that people could pay their last respects. His mortal frame was consigned to flames on a sandalwood pyre on 8 December 1982.

== Works cited ==
Books

- Omkarnath, Sri Sri Sitaramdas (2013). Madman's Jholi. Leadstart Publishing Pvt Ltd. ISBN 978-9382473688.
- Singh Uban, Sujan (1977). Gurus of India. East-West Publications (U.K.) Ltd. ISBN 978-0-85692-004-2.
- Supe, Raj (2010). Pilgrim of the Sky. Leadstart Publishing. ISBN 978-9380154442.
- Omkarnath, Sitaramdas (2010). Jai Jai Ram Krishna Hari. Leadstart Publishing. ISBN 978-9380154541.

Journals

- Murti, Dr. M.Srimannarayana (1998). "S.V.U. ORIENTAL JOURNAL". Sri Venkateswara University Oriental Journal. 41 (Pts. 1 & 2): 188. ISSN 0081-3907.
- Banerjee, Professor Srikumar (1 July 1965). "Thakur Sri Sri Sitaramdas Omkarnath Maharaj By Professor Srikumar Banerjee". The Mountain Path.
