= Indira Chatterji =

Swiss-Indian mathematician

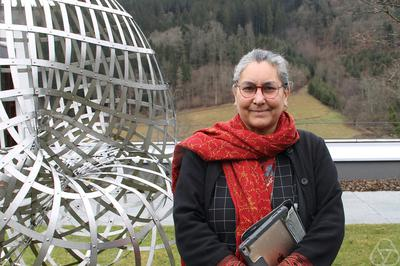
Chatterji at Oberwolfach in 2026

Indira Lara Chatterji (born 25 January 1973) is a Swiss-Indian mathematician working in France as a professor of mathematics in the J. A. Dieudonné Laboratory of the University of Côte d'Azur. Her research involves low-dimensional geometry, cubical complexes, and geometric group theory. She has also studied sexism and institutional bias in mathematics.

== Education and career ==
Chatterji was born in Lausanne, where her father, Indian probability theorist Srishti Dhar Chatterji, worked; her mother was a Swiss woman from Ticino, Carla Bolognini. She is a Swiss citizen, and holds Overseas Citizenship of India. After entering the University of Lausanne intending to study criminology and then sociology, she switched to mathematics, earning a license in 1995 and a diploma in 1997. She completed her doctorate in mathematics at ETH Zurich in 2001. Her dissertation, On property (RD) for certain discrete groups, studied the property of "rapid decay" in group theory, introduced by Vincent Lafforgue in connection with the Baum–Connes conjecture. It was jointly supervised by Marc Burger and Alain Valette.

After working as an H. C. Wang Assistant Professor at Cornell University, she took a tenure-track faculty position at Ohio State University in 2005, and remained there until 2011, earning tenure in 2010. In 2007, she was one of 16 US mathematicians to win an NSF CAREER Award. Meanwhile, in 2007, she began working as a professor at the University of Orléans in France (on leave from Ohio State), and in 2010 was promoted to professor 1st class. In 2014 she moved to her present position in the J. A. Dieudonné Laboratory, originally associated with the University of Nice Sophia Antipolis and currently with the University of Côte d'Azur.

She also serves on the scientific council of the Fondation sciences mathématiques de Paris.

== Animation ==
Along with her mathematical research, Chatterji has made animated drawings that illustrate concepts in geometric group theory for general-audience talks, and exhibited her drawings in the Institute for Computational and Experimental Research in Mathematics "Illustrating Mathematics" program.

== Recognition ==
Chatterji was a junior member of the Institut Universitaire de France from 2014 to 2019.
