= Besharam (1978 film) =

1978 film

- Poster
- Directed by: Deven Verma
- Produced by: Deven Verma; Navratna Films
- Starring: Amitabh Bachchan; Sharmila Tagore; Amjad Khan; Deven Verma
- Music by: Kalyanji Anandji
- Release date: 28 April 1978
- Running time: 149 minutes
- Country: India
- Language: Hindi

Besharam (lit. 'Shameless') is a 1978 Hindi drama/thriller film produced and directed by veteran character actor Deven Verma. The film stars Amitabh Bachchan, Sharmila Tagore, Amjad Khan, A. K. Hangal, Iftekhar, Nirupa Roy and Deven Verma. The film's music was composed by Kalyanji Anandji. The movie was not a hit on release and fared poorly.

== Plot ==
After Digvijay Singh (Amjad Khan) wrongly implicates him as corrupt, honest teacher Ramchandra (A. K. Hangal) commits suicide. When Ramachandra's simple and obedient son Ram Kumar (Amitabh Bachchan), an insurance agent, sets out to find the truth about his father's death, he faces many difficulties.

Pretending to be a decent industrialist named Dharamdas, Digviyay engages in dubious activities like smuggling drugs and running other crimes and becomes a powerful man who keeps venomous snakes to kill his enemies and traitors.

Finding himself in a dangerous battle with the criminal underworld Ram Kumar resolves to fight against injustice and joins forces with the Police Commissioner (Iftekar). Ram Kumar falls in love with Rinku (Sharmila Tagore), unaware that she is Dharamdas's sister.

Transforming himself into Prince Chandrashekar, a diamond businessman from South Africa, Ram Kumar woos Dharmdas's beloved Manju (Bindu) and gets close to her. Ram Kumar succeeds in eventually arresting Dharamdas.

== Cast ==
- Amitabh Bachchan as Ram Kumar/Prince Chandrashekhar
- Sharmila Tagore as Rinku/Monica
- Bindu as Manju
- Amjad Khan as Digvijay Singh/Dharamdas
- Uma Dhawan – Chanda
- Dhumal – Mukhiya
- A. K. Hangal – Ramchandra
- Nirupa Roy – Mrs. Ramchandra
- Iftekhar – Police Commissioner
- Imtiaz Khan – Tony (as Imtiyaz)
- Jagdish Raj – Pandey
- Jayshree T. – Rosie
- Deven Verma – Laxman, his father and mother
- Urmila Bhatt – Rosy
- Helen as an item dancer

== Crew ==
- Director – Deven Verma
- Producer – Deven Verma
- Production Company – Navratna Films
- Music Director – Kalyanji Anandji
- Playback Singers – Asha Bhosle, Lata Mangeshkar, Mahendra Kapoor

== Soundtrack ==
All lyrics are written by Yogesh; all music is composed by Kalyanji–Anandji.

| No. | Title | Singer(s) | Length |
|---|---|---|---|
| 1. | "Chori Chori Chupke Chupke"" | Lata Mangeshkar |
| 2. | "Mere Kis Kaam Ki Yeh Jawani" | Asha Bhosle |
| 3. | "Mere Sukh Mein" | Mahendra Kapoor |
| 4. | "Yeh Raaz-E-Dil Tumhara" | Lata Mangeshkar |
