= Aalam =

Aalam العالم
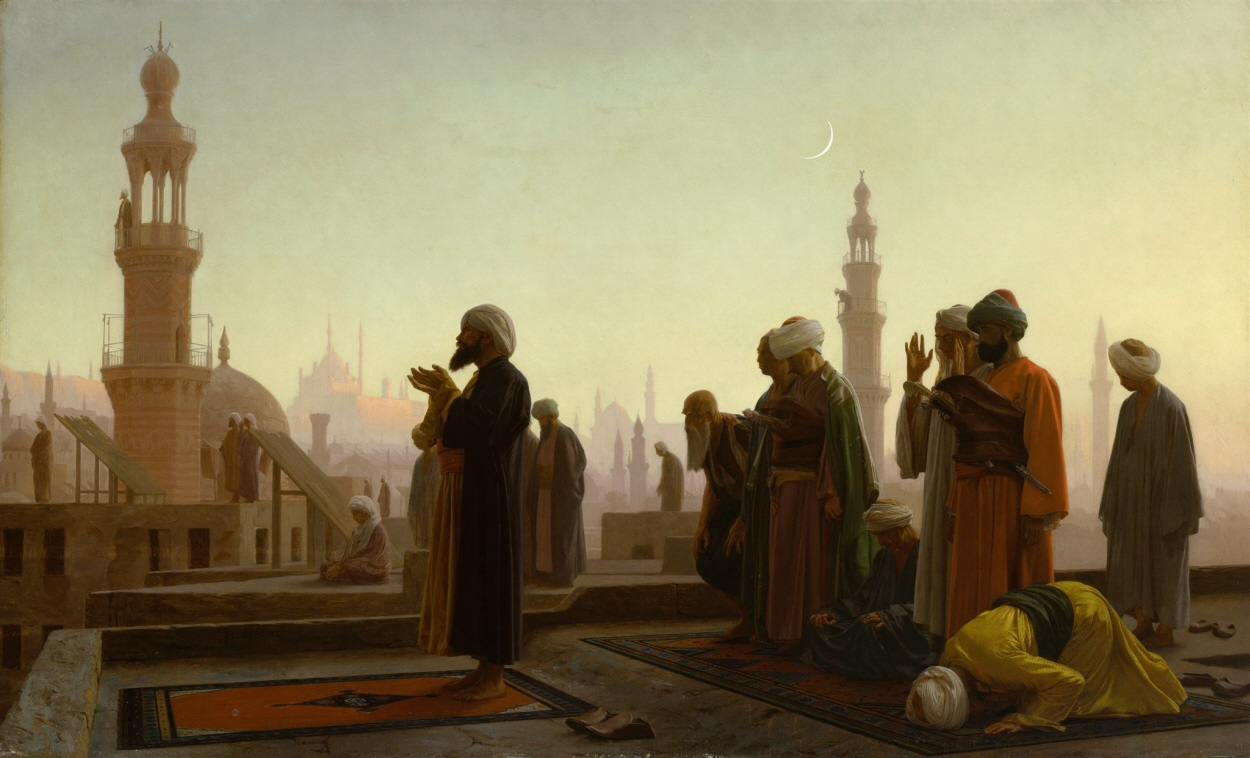

Regions with significant populations
- Muslim world

Religions
- Islam

Languages
- Arabic, Persian, Urdu, Kashmiri and others

Aalam, also spelled as Aalem, (Arabic : العالم) is a surname found in the Middle East, Central Asia, Afghanistan, Pakistan, Kashmir, and India. Aalam has several meanings, including world, scholar, expert, learned man, and universe.

== Notable people with the surname ==
- Shah Alam II (born 25 June 1728), Mughal emperor and the son of Alamgir II
- Mohammad Shams Aalam Shaikh (born 1986), Indian Para swimmer
- Mohammed Aftab Aalam (born 1962), Nepalese politician
- Mujeeb Aalam (1948–2004), Pakistani playback singer
- Shabab Aalam (born 1984), Indian author, educationalist and satirist

== See also ==
- Alam
- Kot Aalam, village in Sindh, Pakistan
