= Baton Baton Mein =

- Theatrical release poster
- Directed by: Basu Chatterjee
- Written by: C J Pavri
- Produced by: Basu Chatterjee
- Starring: Amol Palekar; Tina Ambani; Pearl Padamsee
- Music by: Rajesh Roshan
- Release date: 13 April 1979
- Running time: 113 minutes
- Country: India
- Language: Hindi

Baton Baton Mein (transl. In Between Talks) is a 1979 Indian romantic comedy film, produced and directed by Basu Chatterjee. The film stars Amol Palekar and Tina Munim. David, Pearl Padamsee, Asrani and Ranjit Choudhary appear in supporting roles. The film's music is by Rajesh Roshan.

== Plot ==
Rosie Perreira is an overly anxious widow, living with her violin-obsessed son, Sabby and a lovely daughter, Nancy whom she would like to marry a wealthy young man. Her brother and neighbour, Tom introduces a young eligible Tony Braganza to Nancy on the 9:10 AM Western Railway local train from Bandra to Churchgate. Tom also asks Nancy to introduce Tony to Rosie, which she does. Rosie is initially apprehensive about him as he only drawing a mere Rs.300/- compared to Nancy's Rs.700/-, but soon changes her mind when she finds out that after his probationary period he will draw a monthly pay of Rs.1,000/-. Nancy and Tony are permitted to meet and both eventually fall in love. While Nancy has a past where she was betrayed by a boy whom she loved, she still likes Tony. Tony is hesitant, and this is what costs him Nancy's love, as Rosie feels that he will not come through with the marriage. And soon Rosie starts looking elsewhere for a son-in-law. Nancy does not like this, but she at first accepts her mum's wishes. Nancy and Tony have a fight and stop meeting each other on the train as well. When Tom learns about this, he speaks to Tony's father. Tony's father tells Tony that if he is still reluctant to make a commitment, he should tell Nancy about it. So Nancy and Tony meet each other and Nancy tells him that she will never meet him again. It is then that Tony feels that he actually loves Nancy and cannot live without her. Then Nancy also confesses her love for him and they marry.

== Cast ==
- Amol Palekar as Tony Braganza
- Tina Munim as Nancy Pereira
- Asrani as Francis Fernandes
- David as Tom Uncle
- Leela Mishra as Philomena Aunty
- Pearl Padamsee as Rosie Pereira
- Arvind Deshpande as Mr. Braganza
- Piloo J. Wadia as Mrs. Braganza
- Ranjit Chowdhry as Seby Pereira
- Uday Chandra as Henry
- Deb Mukherjee as Peter
- Prema Narayan as Julie
- Shobhini Singh as Hazel Pinto
- R. S. Chopra as Tony's boss

== Music ==
All music was composed by Rajesh Roshan and the lyrics were by Yogesh and Amit Khanna. The song "Na Bole Tum Na Maine Kuch Kaha" was adapted from the American Civil War song "When Johnny Comes Marching Home".

Song	Singer	Lyricist
"Kahan Tak Yeh Man Ko"	Kishore Kumar	Yogesh
"Suniye, kahiye...Kehte Sunte Baton Baton Mein Pyar Ho Jayega"	Kishore Kumar, Asha Bhosle	Amit Khanna
"Na Bole Tum, Na Maine Kuch Kaha"	Asha Bhosle, Amit Kumar	Yogesh
"Uthe Sabke Kadam, Dekho Rum Pum Pum"	Lata Mangeshkar, Amit Kumar	Amit Khanna

== Reception ==
In a retrospective review, Vijay Lokapally of The Hindu praised the film's realism and stated that it "surely lifts your spirit". Writing for the Indian Express, Sampada Sharma found the complications in Tony and Nancy's romance to be representative of present woes in modern relationships. Komal RJ Panchal of the Indian Express saw the film as a look at the daily lives of Mumbaiites and commended the non-stereotypical depiction of the Christian community in Bandra.
