= Zaheera =

Indian actress

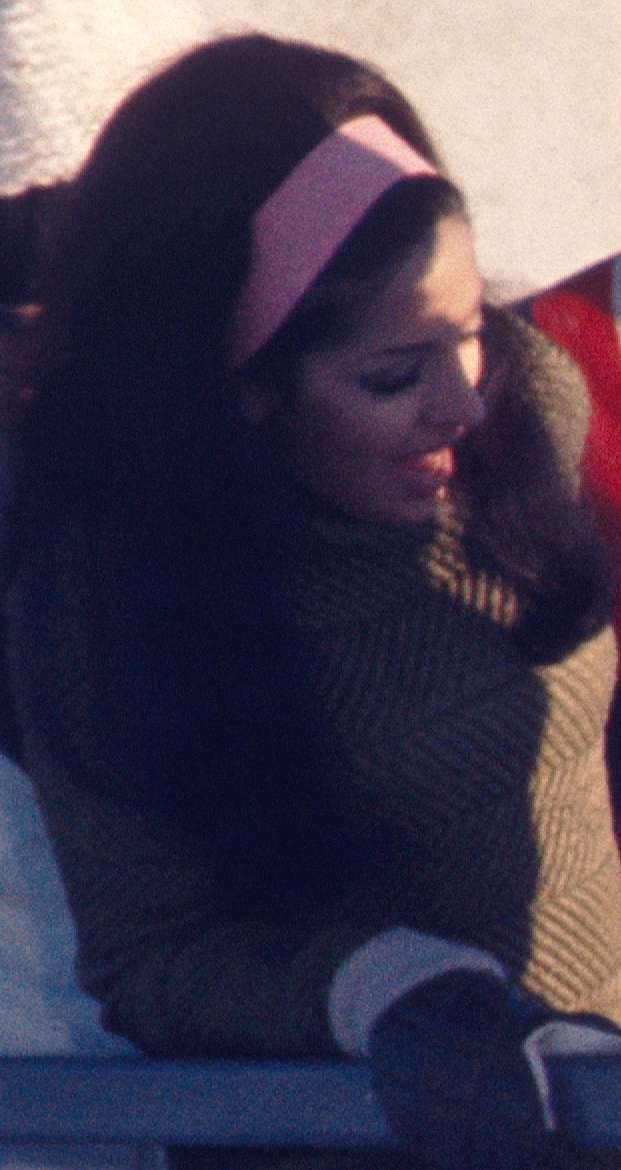
- Zaheera on location in Switzerland filming On Her Majesty's Secret Service, 1968
- Born: Zaheera
- Occupation: Actress

Zaheera is an Indian actress. She debuted in the James Bond movie On Her Majesty's Secret Service in 1969. She would go on to appear in Bollywood movies over the next decade. She appeared in a lead role for the first time in Call Girl (1974), directed by Vijay Kapoor, a movie with a controversial theme at that time and was a hit at the box office. She also had roles in Aadmi Sadak Ka and Naukri. One of her hit films was Gambler with Dev Anand, Shatrughna Sinha, Zahida and Jeevan. She has worked in a few Punjabi movies as well.

== Personal life ==
Zaheera lived in the United Kingdom around the time of the shooting for On Her Majesty's Secret Service, and moved back to India to pursue a career in Bollywood. After her Bollywood career, she moved back to London.

Zaheera was credited under multiple names throughout her career including Zara, Zahira, Zahirra, and Zaherra.

== Filmography ==
- On Her Majesty's Secret Service (1969) (as Zara)
- The Gambler (1971) (as Zahira): Julie
- Anokha Daan (1972)
- Anjaan Raahen (1974): Sunita
- Alingan (1974)
- Call Girl (1974): Maya/Kamini
- Toofan Aur Bijlee (1975): Madhuri/Sheela
- Zinda Dil (1975): Rekha
- Mere Sartaj (1975): Parveen J. Gulrez
- Ek Hans Ka Joda (1975): Tina
- Dharmatma (1975) (as Zahirra)
- Harfan Maulaa (1976) (as Zaherra): Qawali Announcer
- Do Khiladi (1976)
- Taxi Taxie (1977): Jyoti Sharma
- Saal Solvan Chadya (1977): Bubbly
- Aadmi Sadak Ka (1977) (as Zaherra): Vandana Tandon
- Kaala Aadmi (1978)
- Aahuti (1978): Kusum
- Naukri (1978): Ramola
- Khuda Kasam (1981) (as Zahira): Latika
- Shakka (1981) (as Zaherra): Meena
- Lubna (1982)
