= Chor Ke Ghar Chor =

- Directed by: Vijay Sadanah
- Starring: Ashok Kumar; Randhir Kapoor; Zeenat Aman; Pran
- Music by: Kalyanji-Anandji
- Release date: 24 November 1978
- Country: India
- Language: Hindi

Chor Ke Ghar Chor is a 1978 Indian Hindi-language film directed by Vijay Sadanah. It stars Ashok Kumar and Pran in lead roles with supporting roles played by Randhir Kapoor, Zeenat Aman, Deven Verma and Raza Murad.

== Synopsis ==
Rajkumari Ophelia desires a statuette of Devi Maa located in Pratapgarh. She recruits Sher Singh to retrieve it, promising to marry him if he succeeds in bringing it to her.

Sher Singh sets out on his mission, but before he can obtain the statuette, Thakur takes possession of it, incurring Devi Maa's wrath and losing his son as a result. Fearing that the rest of his family will also perish on the day of the Khumbh Mela, Thakur orders his brother, Ranjeet, to return the statuette to the Mandir. However, Ranjeet fails in his task, becomes separated from his daughter, Meena, and loses his sanity.

Meanwhile, Ramlal, who possesses the statuette, disappears. His wife becomes separated from their son, Birju, while her brother-in-law, Mangal, is arrested and imprisoned for murdering Rana. She subsequently moves to Bombay with Mangal's son, Shekhar.

Years later, Birju earns a living by making small statues, while Meena performs on the streets with a cow. Mangal has become a gangster, Sher Singh continues to search for the statuette, and Ranjeet remains insane. Shekhar eventually discovers the statuette, attracts public attention by issuing a press release, and places it under security. However, the statuette is stolen once again, and its whereabouts become unknown.

== Cast ==
- Ashok Kumar as Ranjeet Singh
- Randhir Kapoor as Birju
- Zeenat Aman as Meena / Maina
- Pran as Mangal
- Deven Verma as Parvin Bhai / Jaikishan "Jackson" (Double Role)
- Raza Murad as Inspector Shekhar
- Sulochana Latkar as Birju's Mother
- Helen as Courtesan (Special Appearance)
- Bindu as Princess Ophelia (Special Appearance)
- Anwar Hussain as Sher Singh
- Preeti Ganguly as Kanta, Parvin Wife
- Anoop Kumar as Inspector
- Murad as Pratapgarh Thakur Saab
- Sajjan as Ramlal, Pratapgarh minister
- M.B. Shetty as Shankar, Sher Singh goon
- Manmohan as Sher Singh goon
- D.K. Sapru as Minister
- Chaman Puri as Baba
- Birbal
- Radhey Shyam

== Soundtrack ==
Music: Kalyanji–Anandji Lyrics: Verma Malik

Song	Singer
"Nathaniya Kaga Lekar Bhaga"	Asha Bhosle
"Gali Gali Mein Ghuskar"	Manna Dey, Mahendra Kapoor
"Chor Ke Ghar Chor Aa Gaye"	Manna Dey, Mahendra Kapoor
"Ho Sake To Kar Lo Mujhse Pyar Sarkar Thoda Thoda"	Amit Kumar, Kanchan
