= Preeti Ganguly =

Indian actress (1953–2012)

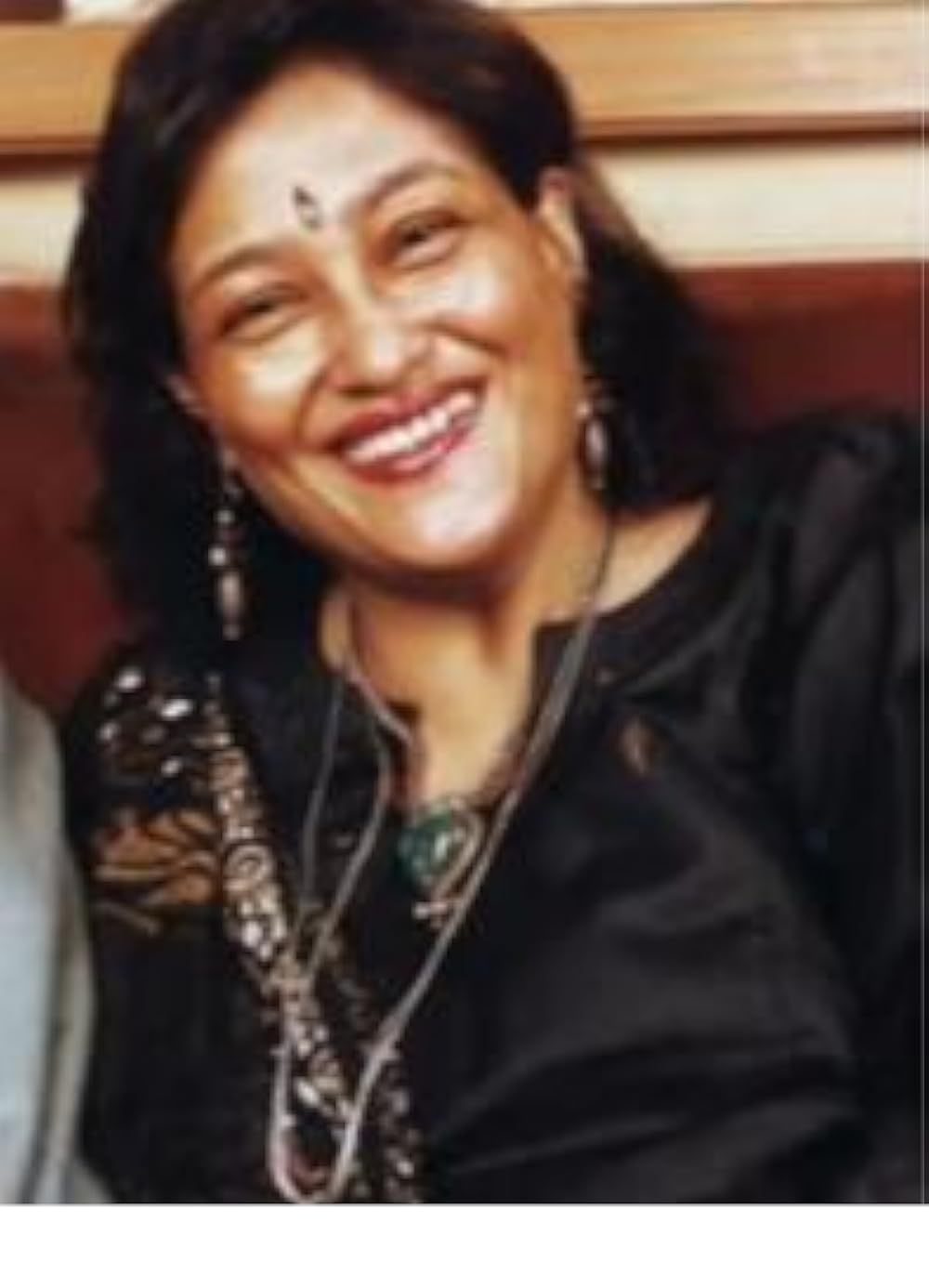
- Born: 17 May 1953; Bombay, Bombay State, India
- Died: 2 December 2012 (aged 59); Mumbai, Maharashtra, India
- Other name: Palu
- Occupation: Actress
- Known for: Comic roles in Hindi cinema
- Parent(s): Ashok Kumar; Shobha Devi
- Relatives: See Ganguly family

Preeti Ganguly (17 May 1953 – 2 December 2012) was an Indian actress who played several comic roles in Bollywood in the 1970s and 1980s. She was the daughter of veteran Indian actor Ashok Kumar and part of the Ganguly family. She was best known for her comic role as Freni Sethna, the die-hard Amitabh Bachchan fan in Basu Chatterjee's Khatta Meetha (1978).

After she lost some 50 kg, her film roles dwindled and later in 1993, she started an acting school named after her father, 'Ashok Kumar's Academy of Dramatic Arts' in Mumbai, where she also took film appreciation classes. Years later, she appeared in Emraan Hashmi starrer, Aashiq Banaya Aapne (2005).

== Personal life ==
Actor Deven Verma is married to her elder sister Rupa Ganguly. Her brother, Aroop Kumar, appeared in only one film, Bezuban, released in 1962. Kishore Kumar, and actor Anoop Kumar were her paternal uncles and her paternal aunt is Sati Devi, married to Sashadhar Mukherjee (brother of Subodh Mukherjee) of the Mukherjee-Samarth family.

Preeti died of a cardiac arrest in Mumbai on 2 December 2012.

== Selected filmography ==
- Dhuen Ki Lakeer (1974)
- Khel Khel Mein (1975)
- Rani Aur Lalpari (1975)
- Balika Badhu (1976)
- Aashiq Hoon Baharon Ka (1977)
- Anurodh (1977)
- Saheb Bahadur (1977)
- Swami (1977)
- Dillagi (1978)
- Khatta Meetha (1978)
- Chor Ke Ghar Chor (1978)
- Damaad (1978)
- Aahuti (1978)
- Ankh Ka Tara (1978)
- Anmol Tasveer (1978)
- Jhoota Kahin Ka (1979)
- Thodisi Bewafai (1980)
- Kranti (1981)
- Tohfa Mohabbat Ka (1988)
- Uttar Dakshin (1987)
- Aashiq Banaya Aapne (2005)
