= Tammareddy Bharadwaja =

Indian film director and producer

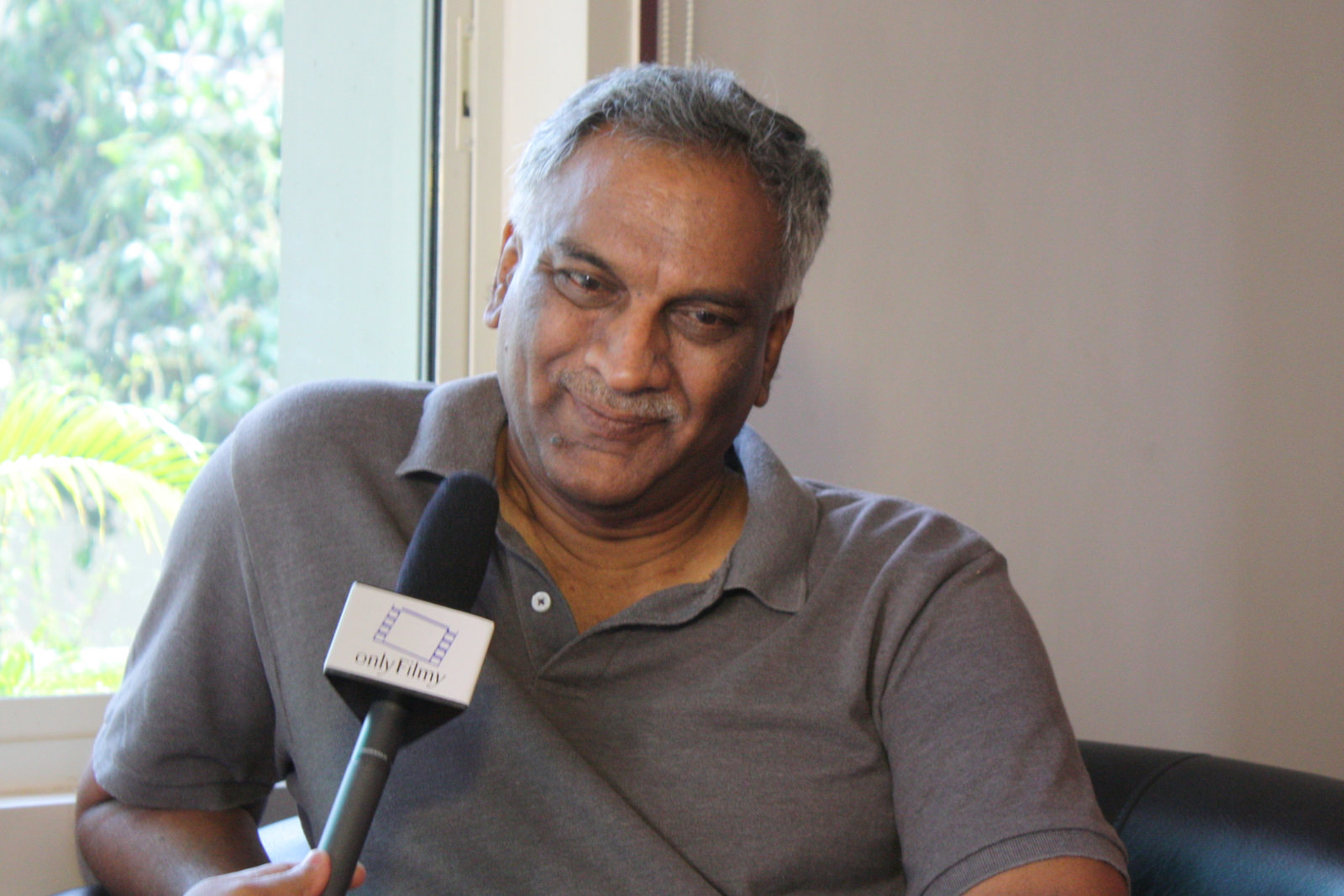
- Born: 30 June 1948 (age 77)
- Occupations: Producer, Director

Tammreddy Bharadwaja is an Indian film director and producer known for his work in Telugu cinema. Over his career, Bharadwaja directed more than 20 films and produced around 15 films. He also served as the president of the Telugu Film Chamber of Commerce. He is known for his role as a liaison between film producers and workers' unions. Bharadwaja is the son of veteran producer Tammareddy Krishna Murthy, a recipient of the prestigious Raghupathi Venkaiah Award.

Bharadwaja began his career as a producer with Kothala Rayudu (1979), followed by Mogudu Kavali (1980), both of which starred Chiranjeevi and achieved commercial success. He later transitioned to directing, delivering successful films such as Alajadi (1990), Pachani Samsaram (1993), and Swarnakka (1998). In 2006, he directed Pothe Poni, which won the Nandi Award for Best Feature Film (Gold).

== Early life ==
Tammreddy Bharadwaja is born in a film family. His father, Tammareddy Krishna Murthy is a film producer who received the Raghupathi Venkaiah Award. His brother Lenin Babu is also a film director.

Since his childhood, Bharadwaja was interested in labour problems. His father was a communist. Bharadwaja was a union member in Students' Union Federation. Due to these reasons, he was attracted towards labour union problems. Later on in his career, this made him useful as a liaison between Telugu film producers and film workers' unions.

Bharadwaja did his schooling in Wesley High School, Secunderabad. He later did his B. E. in the College of Engineering, Osmania University.

== Career ==
Bharadwaja pursued a career as a Civil Engineer in Andhra Pradesh's irrigation department and also had a brief stint at Hyderabad municipal corporation. He then stepped into film industry in 1979 as a producer and later became a director.

Bharadwaja started a film production company, Charita Chitra named after his daughter. His first film as a producer was Kothala Rayudu (1979). It was also the first film for Chiranjeevi as a full-fledged solo lead. His second film was Mogudu Kavali (1980) also starring Chiranjeevi. Kothala Rayudu ran for 100 days film and Mogudu Kavali ran for 175 days.

Bharadwaja debuted as a director with Manmatha Samrajyam (1989) starring Malasri. His second film as a director was Alajadi (1990), which was commercially successful. Then he directed more films in the next few years, out of which Pachani Samsaram (1993) was a box-office hit.

In 1995, he produced and directed Vetagadu, a remake of Hindi film Baazigar (1993). The film was a major financial set back for Bharadwaja. After the failure of Vetagadu, he closed his office and quit the film industry. His even went abroad to settle down. He came back and changed his banner name to Ravindra Arts, which was his father's banner. He produced and directed Swarnakka (1998) on that banner which became successful.

Bharadwaja produced Suri in 2000 which became a box-office disaster. As per Bharadwaja, for Suri, he even lacked the money to put the movie titles or market the film in newspapers. His next directorial film Ramma Chilakamma (2001) starred Sumanth and Laya and was a box-office failure. His 2006 directorial venture, Pothe Poni was critically acclaimed and won the Nandi Award for Best Feature Film - Gold.

== Filmography ==
Year	Film	Director	Producer	Notes	Ref.
1979	Kothala Raayudu	No	Yes	Debut as a film producer	
1980	Mogudu Kaavali	No	Yes		
1981	Maro Kurukshetram	No	Yes		
1983	Iddaru Kiladilu	No	Yes		
1989	Manmadha Samrajyam	Yes	No	Debut film as a director	
1990	Alajadi	Yes	No		
1990	Kadapa Reddamma	Yes	No		
1990	Neti Dourjanyam	Yes	No		
1991	Siva Sakthi	Yes	No		
1992	Pachani Kapuram	Yes	No		
1993	Rowdy Annayya	Yes	No		
1993	One by Two	No	Yes		
1993	Pachani Samsaram	Yes	No		
1993	Urmila	Yes	Yes	Remake of Hindi film Damini	
1993	Nagajyothi	Yes	No		
1994	Bangaru Mogudu	Yes	No		
1994	Donga Rascal	No	Yes		
1995	Vetagadu	Yes	Yes	Remake of Hindi film Baazigar (1993)	
1995	Simha Gharjana	No	Yes		
1996	Kuthuru	Yes	No		
1997	Atha Nee Koduku Jhagartha	Yes	No		
1998	Antahpuram	No	Yes	Co-producer	
1998	Swarnakka	Yes	Yes		
1998	Swarna Mukhi	Yes	No		
1999	Sanchalanam	Yes	Yes		
2000	Suri	No	Uncredited		
2001	Ramma Chilakamma	Yes	No		
2002	Entha Bagundho	Yes	No		
2003	Nenu Pelliki Ready	No	Yes		
2006	Pothe Poni	Yes	No	Nandi Award for Best Feature Film - Gold	
2014	Prathighatana	Yes	Yes		

Actor

- Nenera Police (1991)
- Seenu Vasanthi Lakshmi (2004)
- Ee Rojullo (2012) as himself

As distributor

- Palasa 1978 (2020)
