= Do Ladke Dono Kadke =

- Directed by: Basu Chatterjee
- Produced by: Jayant Mukherjee; Hemant Kumar
- Starring: Amol Palekar; Asrani; Moushmi Chatterjee
- Cinematography: K. K. Mahajan
- Music by: Hemant Kumar
- Release date: 5 January 1979
- Country: India
- Language: Hindi

Do Ladke Dono Kadke is a 1979 Bollywood drama comedy film directed by Basu Chatterjee starring Amol Palekar, Moushumi Chatterjee and Asrani in lead roles. The film produced and music composed by Hemant Kumar.

== Plot ==
Hari and Ramu, two petty thieves decide to rob a house that kidnappers had decided to kidnap a child from. Chaos ensues as the child ends up with the petty thieves, and both the thieves and the kidnappers claim the ransom. Assorted characters show up to claim the reward offered by the child's parents.

== Cast ==
- Navin Nischol as Lekhraj Malhotra
- Amol Palekar as Hari
- Moushumi Chatterjee as Rani
- G. Asrani as Ramu
- Keshto Mukherjee as Shantu's husband / local drunk
- Iftekhar as Inspector Shinde
- Ranjeet as Ustad
- Master Ravi as Vinnie
- Prema Narayan as Champa
- Dina Pathak as Shantu
- Kartar Singh as Sikh man in the bus
- Nilu Phule as Champa's husband
- Mithu Mukherjee as Maya Malhotra (Guest appearance)
- Viju Khote

== Soundtrack ==
The music of the film was composed by Hemant Kumar and written by Yogesh.

- "Chanda Ki Doli Mein" - Asha Bhosle, K. J. Yesudas
- "Kise Khabar Kahan Dagar Jeevan Ki Le Jaaye" - K. J. Yesudas
