= Ali Baba and the Forty Thieves =

Arabic folk tale

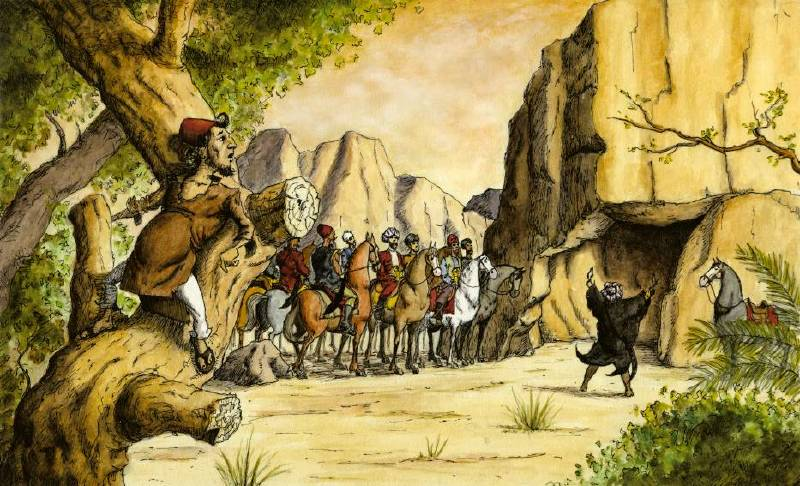
- Ali Baba spies on the thieves

Folk tale
- Name: Ali Baba and the Forty Thieves
- Aarne–Thompson grouping: AaTh 676, "Open Sesame", + AaTh 954, "The Forty Thieves"; ATU 954, "The Forty Thieves"
- Region: SWANA
- Published in: One Thousand and One Nights, translated by Antoine Galland

"Ali Baba and the Forty Thieves" (Arabic: علي بابا والأربعون لصا) is a folk tale in Arabic added to the One Thousand and One Nights in the 18th century by its French translator Antoine Galland, who heard it from Syrian storyteller Hanna Diyab. As one of the most popular Arabian Nights tales, it has been widely retold and performed in many media across the world, especially for children (for whom the more violent aspects of the story are often removed).

In the original version, Ali Baba (Arabic: عَلِيّ بَابَا, romanized: ʿAliyy Bābā) is a poor woodcutter and an honest person who discovers the secret treasure of a thieves' den, and enters with the magic phrase "open sesame". The thieves try to kill Ali Baba while his rich and greedy brother Cassim (Arabic: قاسم Qāsim, sometimes spelled 'Kasim' or 'Qasim') tries to steal the treasure for himself, but Ali Baba’s faithful slave-girl Morgiana (Arabic: مرجانة Murjāna) foils their plots. His son marries her, and Ali Baba keeps the secret of the treasure.

== Textual history ==
The tale was added to the story collection One Thousand and One Nights by one of its European translators, Antoine Galland, who called his volumes Les Mille et Une Nuits (1704–1717). Galland was an 18th-century French Orientalist who heard it in oral form from a Syrian Maronite story-teller called Hanna Diyab, who came from Aleppo in modern-day Syria and told the story in Paris. In any case, the earliest known text of the story is Galland's French version. Richard F. Burton included it in the supplemental volumes (rather than the main collection of stories) of his translation (published as The Book of the Thousand Nights and a Night).

The American Orientalist Duncan Black MacDonald discovered an Arabic-language manuscript of the story at the Bodleian Library; however, this was later found to be a counterfeit.

== Story ==
Ali Baba and his older brother Cassim are the sons of a merchant. After their father's death, the greedy Cassim marries a wealthy woman and becomes well-to-do, living lazily on their father's business and his wife's wealth. Ali Baba marries a poor woman and settles into the trade of a woodcutter. Cassim and his wife resent Ali Baba and his side of the family and do not share their wealth with them.

One day, Ali Baba is at work collecting and cutting firewood in the forest, when he happens to overhear a group of forty thieves visiting their stored treasure to load it up. The treasure is in a cave, the mouth of which is sealed by a huge rock. It opens on the magic words "open sesame" and seals itself on the words "close sesame". When the thieves are gone, Ali Baba enters the cave himself and although there is a vast amount of riches stashed inside, he modestly takes only a single bag of gold coins home.

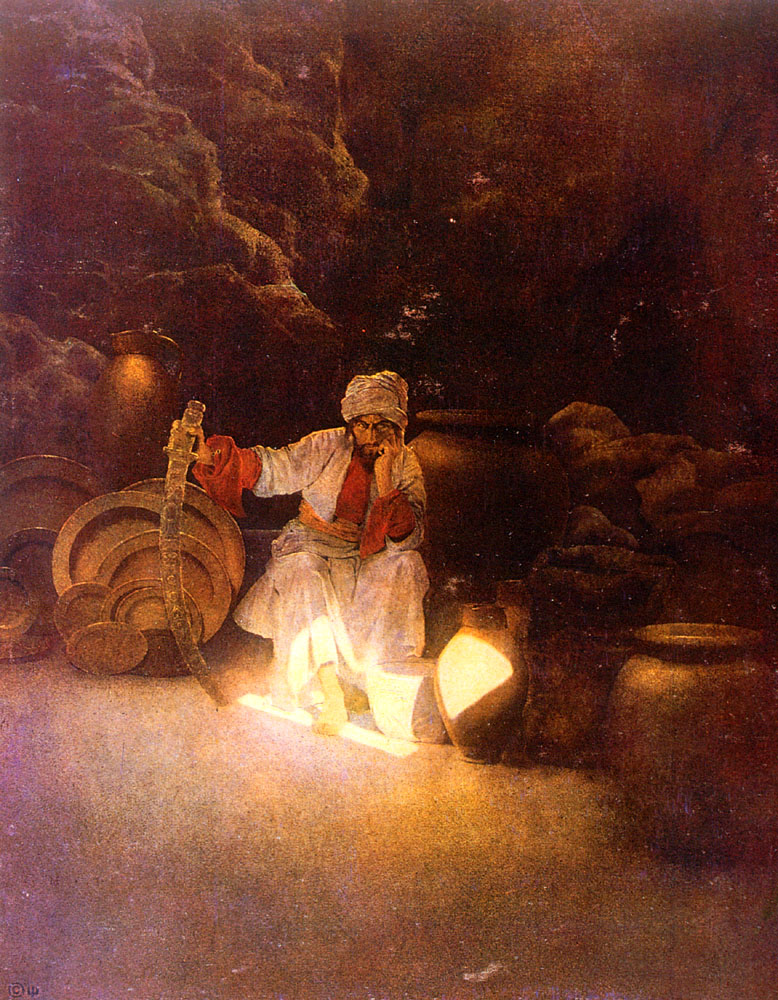
Cassim, Ali Baba's elder brother, in the cave by Maxfield Parrish (1909)

Ali Baba and his wife borrow his sister-in-law's scales to weigh their new wealth. Unbeknownst to them, Cassim's wife puts a blob of wax in the scales to find out what Ali Baba is using them for, as she is curious to know what kind of grain her impoverished brother-in-law needs to measure.

To her shock, she finds a gold coin sticking to the scales and tells her husband. Under pressure from his brother, Ali Baba is forced to reveal the secret of the cave. Cassim goes to the cave, taking a donkeys with him to take as much treasure as possible. He enters the cave with the magic words. However, in his excited greed over the treasure, he forgets the words to get out again and ends up trapped. The thieves find him there and kill him. When his brother does not come back, Ali Baba goes to the cave to look for him, and finds the body quartered and with each piece displayed just inside the cave's entrance, as a warning to anyone else who might try to enter.

Ali Baba brings the corpse home where he entrusts Morgiana, a clever slave-girl from Cassim's household, with the task of making others believe that Cassim has died a natural death. First, Morgiana purchases medicines from an apothecary, telling him that Cassim is gravely ill. Then, she finds an old tailor known as Baba Mustafa whom she pays, blindfolds, and leads to Cassim's house. There, overnight, the tailor stitches the pieces of Cassim's body back together. Ali Baba and his family are able to give Cassim a proper burial without anyone suspecting anything. Cassim’s wife does not find out about the cave or treasure.

The thieves, finding the body gone, realize that another person must have known their secret, so they set out to track him down. One of the thieves goes down to the town and comes across Baba Mustafa, who mentions that he has just sewn the pieces of a corpse back together. Realizing the dead man must have been the thieves' victim, the thief asks Baba Mustafa to lead the way to the house where the deed was performed. The tailor is blindfolded again, and in this state he is able to retrace his steps and find the house.

The thief marks the door with a symbol so the other thieves can come back that night and kill everyone in the house. However, the thief has been seen by Morgiana who, loyal to her master, foils the thief's plan by marking all the houses in the neighborhood similarly. When the 40 thieves return that night, they cannot identify the correct house, and their leader kills the unsuccessful thief in a furious rage. The next day, another thief revisits Baba Mustafa and tries again. Only this time, a chunk is chipped out of the stone step at Ali Baba's front door. Again, Morgiana foils the plan by making similar chips in all the other doorsteps, and the second thief is killed for his failure as well. At last, the leader of the thieves goes and looks himself. This time, he memorizes every detail he can of the exterior of Ali Baba's house.

The leader of the thieves pretends to be an oil merchant in need of Ali Baba's hospitality, bringing with him mules loaded with 38 oil jars, one filled with oil, the other 37 hiding the other remaining thieves. Once Ali Baba is asleep, the thieves plan to kill him. Again, Morgiana discovers and foils the plan when her lamp runs out of oil and she has to get it from the merchant's jars; the thieves give themselves away one by one hearing her approach and mistaking her for their boss. After refilling her lamp, Morgiana kills the 37 thieves in their jars by pouring boiling oil on them one by one. When their leader comes to rouse his men, he discovers they are all dead and escapes. The next morning, Morgiana tells Ali Baba about the thieves in the jars. They bury them, and Ali Baba shows his gratitude by giving Morgiana her freedom. However, she continues living with Ali Baba and his family anyway.

To exact revenge, the leader of the thieves establishes himself as a merchant, befriends Ali Baba's son (who is now in charge of his late uncle Cassim's business), and is invited to dinner at Ali Baba's house. However, the thief is recognized by Morgiana, who performs a sword dance with a dagger for the diners and plunges it into the thief's heart, when he is off his guard. Ali Baba is at first angry with Morgiana, but when he finds out the thief wanted to kill him, he is extremely grateful and rewards Morgiana by marrying her to his son. Ali Baba is then left as the only one knowing the secret of the treasure in the cave and how to access it.

== Analysis ==
=== Tale type ===
The story was classified in the second revision of the international Aarne-Thompson Index (AT or AaTh) as a combination of two tale types: AaTh 676, "Open Sesame", and AaTh 954, "The Forty Thieves". In the first type, a poor man listens to the secret command uttered before a cave of robbers, enters it and steals the riches; his rich brother tries to replicate the sibling's success, but forgets the secret spell and is killed. In the second type, the robbers hide in oil casks and are brought to a house; the girl kills the robbers. In the 2004 revision, by German folklorist Hans-Jörg Uther, tale type AaTh 676 has been subsumed under a new indexing, ATU 954, "The Forty Thieves".

Scholars Ulrich Marzolph and Richard van Leewen suggest that, despite oral variants deriving from its literary source, an "independent strand" of tradition may have existed. In the same vein, Ton Dekker points to an Eastern origin for the story, based on its elements (the hidden treasure chamber, the magic formula to open up the mountain, carrying the thieves inside leather bags).

=== Variants ===
According to Stith Thompson and Ton Dekker, the story of Ali Baba and the Forty Thieves integrated into the oral tradition of "nearly every country" of Europe after the translation of The Arabian Nights. Since its original printed appearance, the tale type has enjoyed "almost universal ... diffusion". Swedish scholar Waldemar Liungman noted its diffusion through the whole of Europe and in Africa, especially across the West Coast.

A West African version, named The Password: Outwitting Thieves, has been found.

Percy Amaury Talbot located a Nigerian variant, called The Treasure House in the Bush, from Ojong Akpan of Mfamosing.

“Die Schatzhöhle der Wuarssen” ("The Treasure Cave of the Wuarssen"), a variant from the Kabyle, was published by Leo Frobenius.

An American variant was collected by Elsie Clews Parsons from Cape Verde. Emelyn Elizabeth Gardner found another American version in New York.

== In popular culture ==
=== Audio recordings and music ===
Audio readings/dramatizations include:

- Dick Bentley played Ali Baba in a musical dramatization on Riverside Records (RLP 1451)/Golden Wonderland (GW 231).
- A 1947 audio recording narrated by Lionel Barrymore made by Leo the Lion records, which was often rereleased alongside Dr. Seuss's Horton Hatches the Egg, on vinyl and cassette.
- The story was dramatized for Tale Spinners for Children on United Artists Records (UAC 11018).
- Anthony Quayle narrated the story on Caedmon Records (TC 1251)/Fontana Records (SFL 14108).
- Martyn Green narrated the story on Arabian Nights' Entertainment (Riverside Records RLP 1405).
- Bing Crosby narrated and sang a version of the story for Simon & Schuster Records (A298:20)/Gala Records (GLP 351).
- Bing Crosby recorded the story on 25 April 1957, linking the narrative with songs. This was issued as an album Ali Baba and the Forty Thieves in 1957.
- "1001 Nights (Alibaba)", a song by Pappy'ion on CBS Records (CBS 7849), mainly known for its Chinese adaptation, "阿里巴巴" by Peter Chen (陳彼得) on TONY東尼機構 Records (TONY LP-026)
- "Main Hoon Alibaba", a song from the 1953 Indian film Char Chand by Talat Mehmood and Premlata, it narrates the adventures of Ali Baba.
- "Alibaba Alibaba", a song by Asha Bhosle from Alibaba Aur 40 Chor, a 1966 Indian film.
- "Ali Babà", a song from the 14th edition of Zecchino d'Oro sung by Settimio Ferlisi and Paola Catellani in 1972.
- "Main Alibaba" is a song by K. J. Yesudas from Alibaba Marjinaa, a 1977 Indian film adaptation of the folktale.
- "Alibaba Alibaba" is a song about Alibaba and his love for Marjina by Suresh Wadkar and Kavita Krishnamurthy, from the 1982 Indian film Jeeo Aur Jeene Do.
- "Ali Baba Ali Baba" is a song about the woodcutter by Runa Laila and Aadesh Shrivastava from the 1990 Indian film Agneepath.
- On the first track on Licensed to Ill, "Rhymin' & Steelin'", the Beastie Boys chant "Ali Baba and the forty thieves".

=== Stage ===
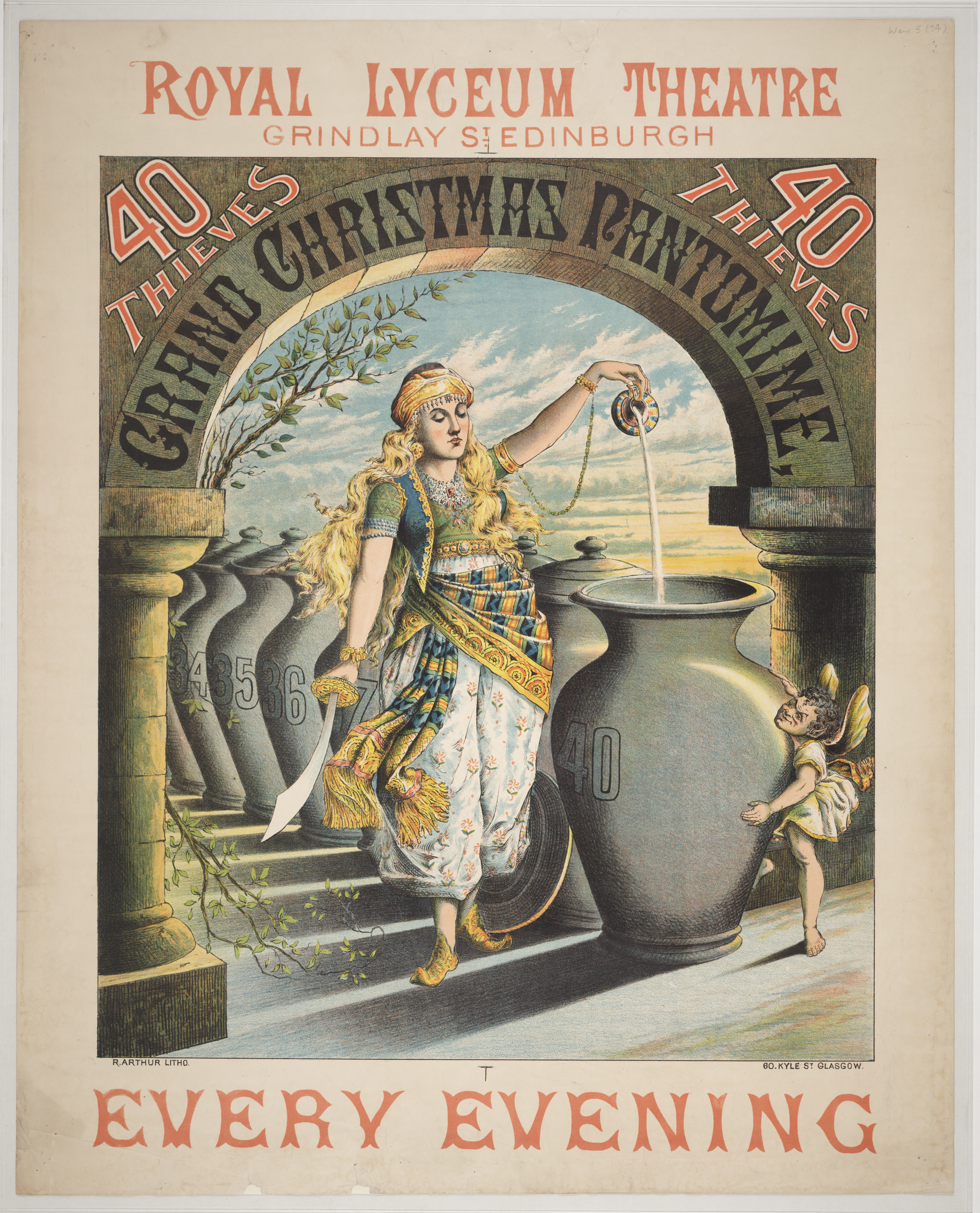
Poster for 40 Thieves at the Royal Lyceum Theatre, Edinburgh, 1886, featuring Morgiana

- The story has been used as a popular pantomime plot for many years. An example of the "pantomime Ali Baba" was the pantomime/musical Chu Chin Chow (1916).
- Badi-Bandar Rupkatha (বাঁদী-বান্দার রূপকথা) is a 2014 Bangladeshi theatrical dance adaptation of Ali Baba and Forty Thieves organised by Srishti cultural centre and Nrityanchal. Many leading Bangladeshi dancers performed in the adaptation such as Shamim Ara Nipa, Shibli Sadiq, etc.

=== Cinema ===
==== Live-action non-English language films ====
- Alibaba and the Forty Thieves is a 1927 Indian silent film adaptation by Bhagwati Prasad Mishra.
- Alibaba Aur Chalis Chor (Alibaba and the Forty Thieves) is a 1932 Indian Hindi-language feature film by J.J. Madan.
- Alibaba is a 1937 Indian Bengali-language fantasy-comedy film adaptation by Modhu Bose of Kshirode Prasad Vidyavinode's play based on the story of Ali Baba. It stars Bibhuti Ganguly in the title role, Sadhana Bose as Marjina, Modhu Bose as Abdullah, and Kamal Biswas as Kasim - the antagonist.
- Ali Baba is a 1940 Indian Hindi-language fantasy film by Mehboob Khan. The film was a bilingual, made in Punjabi language as Alibaba at the same time. It stars Surendra in a double role as Ali Baba and his son along with Sardar Akhtar, Ghulam Mohammed and Wahidan Bai.
- Alibabavum 40 Thirudargalum (Alibaba and the Forty Thieves) is a 1941 Indian Tamil-language comedy film adaptation by K. S. Mani.
- Ali Baba We El Arbeen Haramy (1942, in aka Ali Baba and the Forty Thieves) is an Egyptian film adaptation, starring Ali Al-Kassar as Ali Baba and the comedian actor Ismail Yasin as his assistant.
- Ali Baba is a 1945 Indian Hindi-language film adaptation by Nanubhai Vakil.
- Ali Baba et les quarante voleurs (1954) is a French film starring Fernandel and Samia Gamal.
- Alibaba Aur 40 Chor (Alibaba and 40 Thieves) is a 1954 Indian Hindi-language fantasy action film directed by Homi Wadi. It stars Mahipal in the title role and Shakila as his love interest, Marjina.
- Son of Ali Baba is a 1955 Indian Hindi-language fantasy film by Majnu. It follows the adventures of Ali Baba's son.
- Alibabavum 40 Thirudargalum (Alibaba and the Forty Thieves) is a 1956 Indian Tamil-language adventure fantasy-drama film by T. R. Sundaram, starring M. G. Ramachandran in the title role.
- Khul Ja Sim Sim (Open Sesame) is a 1956 Indian Hindi-language action film by Nanubhai Vakil, starring Mahipal and Shakila in the lead roles. It starts from when Ali Baba has gained the treasure of the thieves after defeating them but his arrogance grows and he starts using the money for his own pleasure.
- Sim Sim Marjeena is a 1958 Indian Hindi-language fantasy film by Naren Dave, starring Helen and Mahipal in the lead roles. It follows the adventures of Ali Baba and Marjeena, who serves as his love interest here. It is a sequel to 1956's Khul Ja Sim Sim.
- Aik Tha Alibaba (There was a Alibaba) is a 1963 Indian Hindi-language action film adaptation by Harbans Singh.
- Sindbad Alibaba and Aladdin is a 1965 Indian Hindi-language musical fantasy-adventure film by Prem Narayan Arora. It features the three most popular characters from the Arabian Nights.
- Ali Baba Bujang Lapok (1960) is a Singaporean comedy film by P. Ramlee which quite faithfully adhered to the tale's plot details but introduced a number of anachronisms for humour, for example the usage of a truck instead of donkey by Cassim Baba to steal the robbers' loot.
- Alibaba Aur 40 Chor (Alibaba and 40 Thieves) is a 1966 Indian Hindi-language adventure-fantasy film by Homi Wadia, starring Sanjeev Kumar in the lead role.
- Ali Baba 40 Dongalu is a 1970 Indian Telugu-language film by B. Vittalacharya. Based on the folktale, it stars N T Rama Rao in the title role and Jayalalithaa as Marjiana.
- Marjina Abdulla is a 1973 Indian Bengali-language musical film adaptation by Dinen Gupta, starring Santosh Dutta as Ali Baba, Mithu Mukherjee as Marjina, Rabi Ghosh as Abdulla (Marjina's brotherly figure) and Utpal Dutt as the chieftain of the robbers.
- Ali Baba ve Kırk Haramiler (1971, in English: Ali Baba and the Forty Thieves) is a Turkish film, starring Sadri Alışık as Ali Baba.
- Alibabayum 41 Kallanmaarum (Alibaba and 41 Thieves) is a 1975 Indian Malayalam-language musical film by J. Sasikumar, starring Prem Nazir as Ali Baba.
- Ali Baba is a 1976 Indian Hindi-language action adventure-fantasy film, based on the folktale, by Mohammed Hussain.
- Alibaba Marjinaa is a 1977 Indian Hindi-language action-adventure film by Kedar Kapoor, starring Prem Krishan as Alibaba and Tamanna as Marjinaa.
- Adventures of Ali-Baba and the Forty Thieves is a 1980 Indian-Soviet film based on the folktale, directed by Latif Faiziyev and Umesh Mehra. The film stars Indian actors Dharmendra, Hema Malini and Zeenat Aman alongside Russian, Caucasian and Central Asian actors. The storyline is slightly altered to extend as a long movie. The writers were Shanti Prakash Bakshi and Boris Saakov, the music was scored by musician R.D. Burman, and the Choreographer was P. L. Raj. It was the most successful Indian-Soviet co-production, becoming a success in both India and the Soviet Union.
- 新阿里巴巴 (Xin A Li Ba Ba) /New Ali Baba and Forty Thieves is a 1988 Taiwanese Mandarin-language fantasy-comedy directed by Chun-Liang Chen and Ulysses Chun Ouyang starring Chyi Chin as Ali Baba and Eric Tsang as Ali Mama.
- Alibaba Aur 40 Chor (Alibaba and 40 Thieves) is a 2004 Indian Hindi-language action adventure-drama film by Sunil Agnihotri. A modern-day retelling of the folktale, it follows Alibaba (Arbaaz Khan) as he faces off against a local bandit who has been terrorizing his village.

==== Live-action English-language films ====
- Ali Baba and the Forty Thieves (1944), remade as The Sword of Ali Baba (1965), reimagines the thieves as freedom fighters against Mongol oppression, and Ali Baba as their leader. Frank Puglia portrayed the character named Cassim in both versions.
- Son of Ali Baba is a 1952 film directed by Kurt Neumann and starring Tony Curtis and Piper Laurie. Morris Ankrum plays Ali Baba.

==== Animation - USA ====
- A Comi Color cartoon, Ali Baba (1936)
- 1996 Disney direct-to-video film Aladdin and the King of Thieves, replacing Ali Baba with Aladdin.

==== Animation - Europe, Asia and Oceania ====
- Soviet puppet film of the same name (Russian: Али-Баба и сорок разбойников) directed by Grigory Lomidze, filmed in 1959 at the «Soyuzmultfilm» film studio.
- Ali Baba is a 1973 Indian Bengali-language musical drama short animated film directed by Rohit Mohra.
- Ali Baba appears as a protagonist in the 1975 anime series Arabian Nights: Sinbad's Adventures. This version is portrayed as a young desert raider who befriends Sinbad and accompanies him on his adventures.
- Alibaba is a 2002 Indian 3-D animated adventure film by Usha Ganesarajah, produced by Pentamedia Graphics.
- Alibaba and The Forty Thieves is a 2018 Indian 3D-animated film adaptation by V. Murugan.
- Ali Baba was adapted as a children’s animated film in 1993 by the Australian Burbank Animation Studios. Several aspects of the story were changed to be more suitable for a younger audience, such as Morgiana being a genie that Ali Baba discovers in a lamp, and Morgiana transforming the head thief into a cat instead of killing him. Ali Baba’s wife also has a larger role in the story.

=== Television ===
==== Live-action ====
- Indian TV series Alif Laila, based on the Arabian Nights, had a 14 episode segment on Alibaba and the Forty Thieves.
- Princess Dollie Aur Uska Magic Bag (2004–2006), an Indian teen fantasy adventure television series on Star Plus where Vinod Singh portrays Ali Baba, one of the main characters in the show along with Sinbad and Hatim.
- In the American/British television mini-series Arabian Nights (2000), the story is told faithfully with two major changes. The first is: when Morgiana discovers the thieves in the oil jars, she alerts Ali Baba and, together with a friend, they release the jars on a street with a steep incline that allows the jars to roll down and break open. Furthermore, the city guard is alerted and arrest the disoriented thieves as they emerge from their containers. Later, when Morgiana defeats the thief leader, Ali Baba, who is young and has no children, marries the heroine himself.
- In the 2019 BBC/FX adaptation of A Christmas Carol, Ali Baba was portrayed by Kayvan Novak. This was an expansion from a reference to the character in the original novel.
- This story was partially used in the 2022 Indian fantasy TV series Ali Baba (TV series) aired on Sony SAB, where Sheezan Mohammed Khan (season 1) and Abhishek Nigam (season 2) played the main character of Ali Baba.

==== Animation ====
- Adventures of Ali Baba (2018–2019) is an Indian animated television series, produced by Shilpa Shetty Kundra, which aired on Colors Rishtey. A modern-day retelling of the folktale, it follows brothers Ali and Baba, who protect dungeons and fight evil forces with their supernatural powers.
- Ali Baba Bunny (1957) is a Warner Bros. Merrie Melodies short directed by Chuck Jones. Released on February 9, 1957, it features Bugs Bunny and Daffy Duck stumbling upon a cave filled with treasure, guarded by a ruthless character named Hassan.

=== Video games ===
- Blade of Ali Baba is a unique item of the video game Diablo II (2000).
- "Alibaba" appears as the hacker alias of Futaba Sakura in Persona 5 (2016).
- The story Alibaba and the 40 thieves appears on the website Poptropica as a playable island.
- Alibaba and Morgiana were playable characters in the mobile game Grimms Notes, while the 40 thieves and their leader were enemies.
- "The Forty Thieves" is a questline in Assassin’s Creed Mirage (2023) where the player must help Ali Baba's daughter take on the forty thieves.

=== Military ===
At the United States Air Force Academy, Cadet Squadron 40 was originally nicknamed "Ali Baba and the Forty Thieves" before eventually changing its name to the "P-40 Warhawks".

The name "Ali Baba" was often used as derogatory slang by American and Iraqi soldiers and their allies in the Iraq War, to describe individuals suspected of a variety of offenses related to theft and looting. Additionally, British soldiers routinely used the term to refer to Iraqi civilians. In the subsequent occupation, it is used as a general term for the insurgents.

The Iraqis adopted the term "Ali Baba" to describe foreign troops suspected of looting.

=== Miscellaneous ===
- Alibaba Group of China used the name because of its universal appeal.
- Zero-knowledge proofs are often introduced to students of computer science with a pedagogical parable involving "Ali Baba's Cave."

== Gallery ==
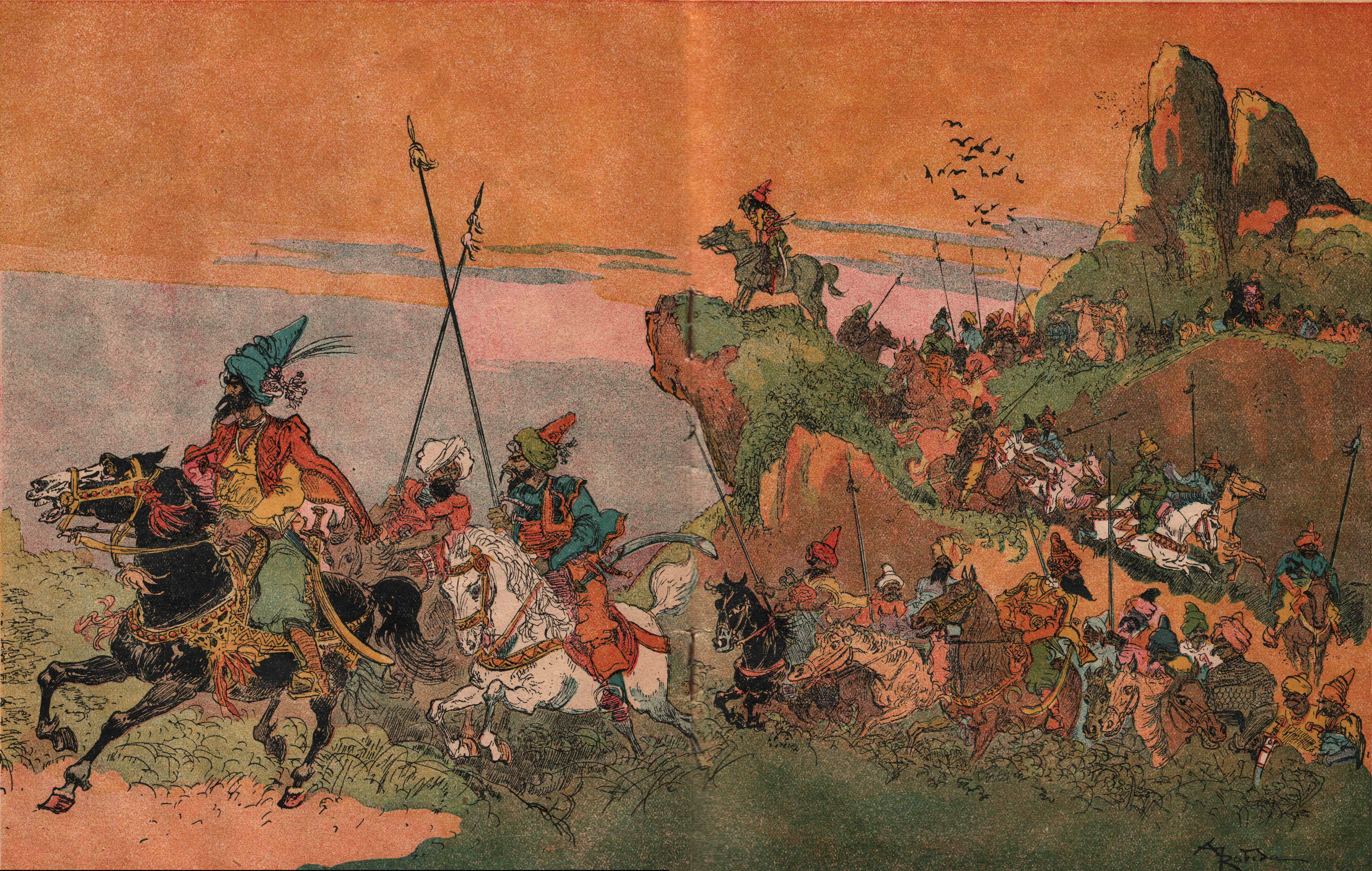
A depiction of the Forty Thieves.

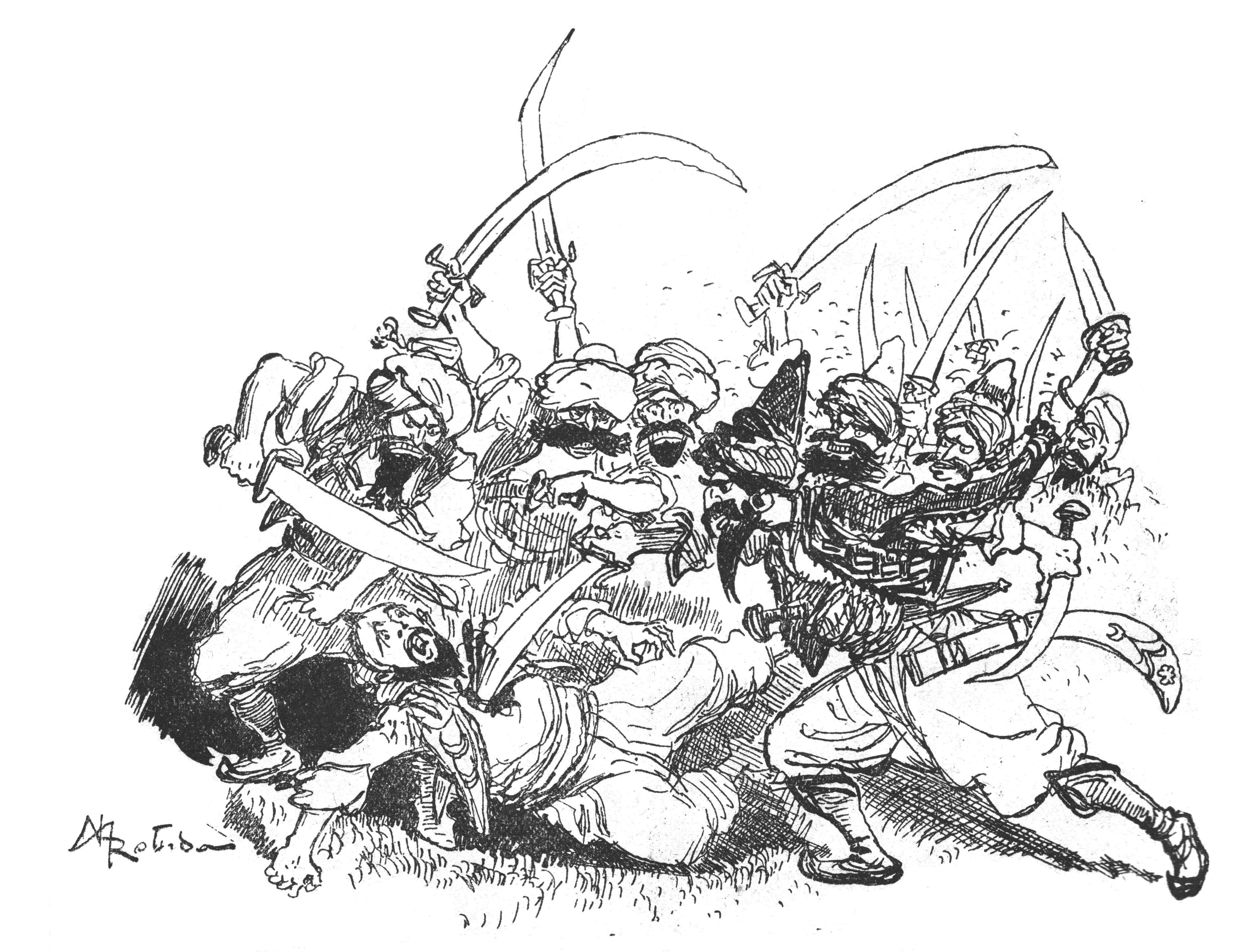
The Forty Thieves attack Cassim.

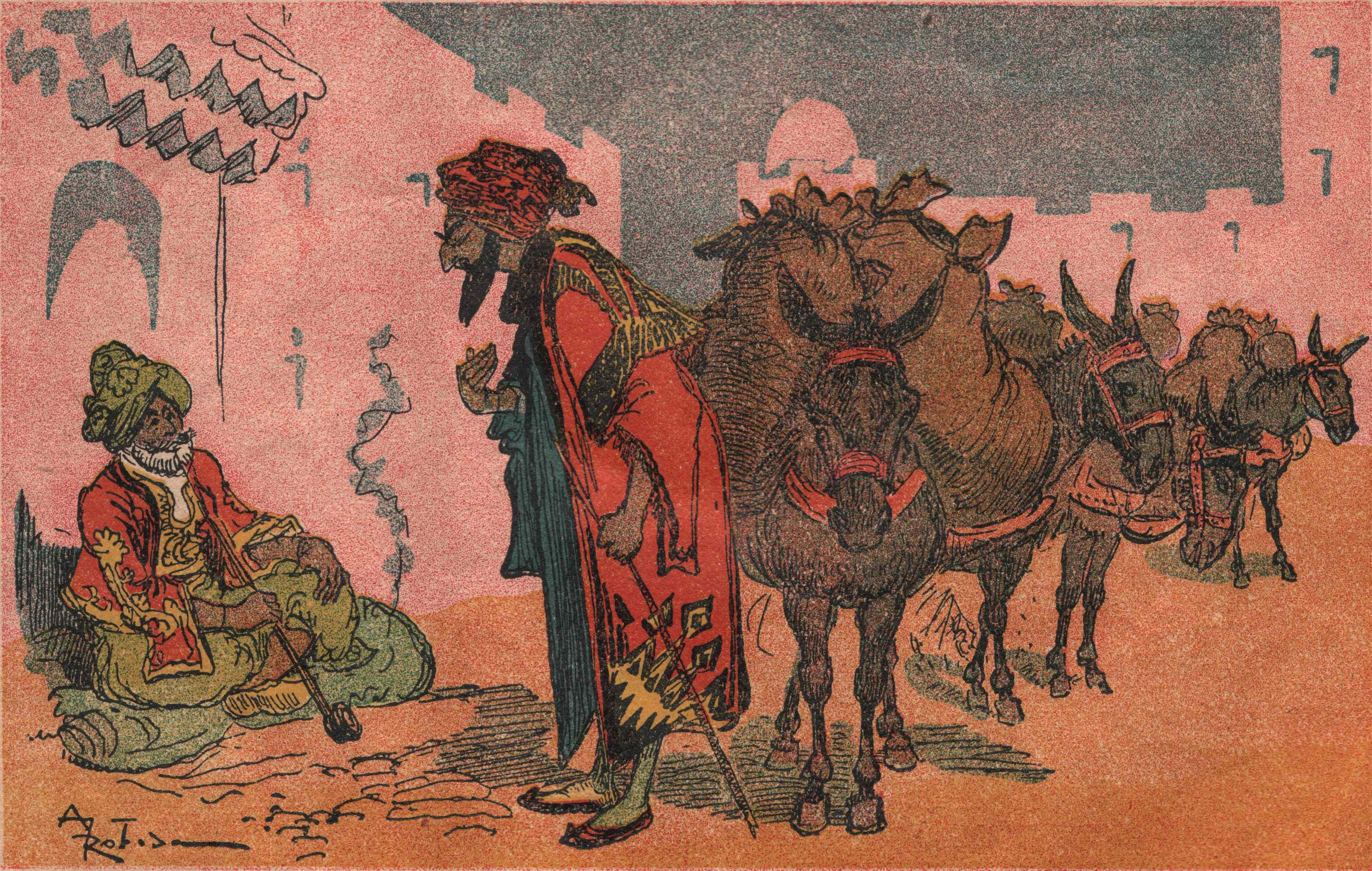
A member of the Forty Thieves tries to discover the location of the house of Ali Baba.

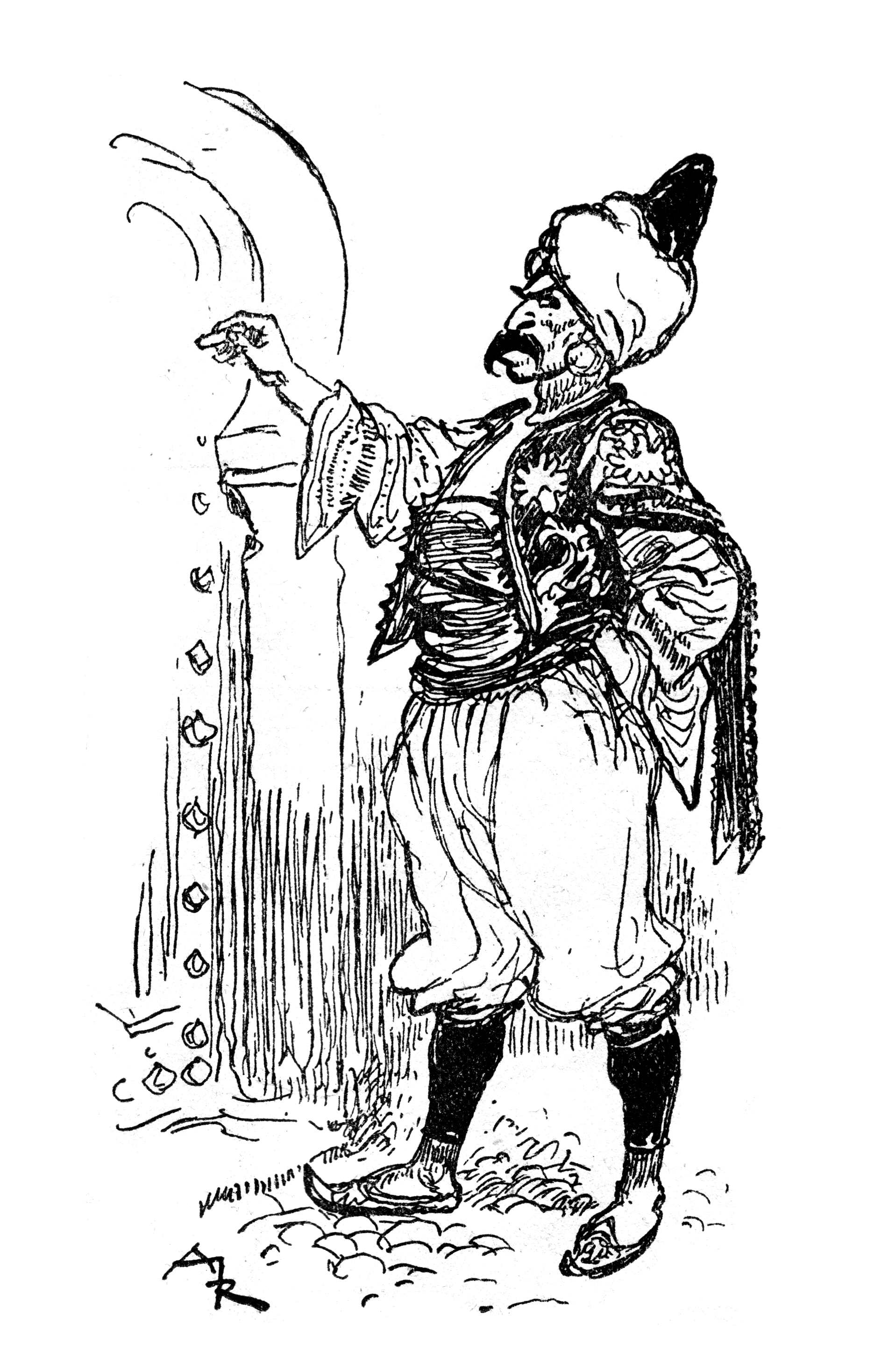
A member of the Forty Thieves marks the door of Ali Baba

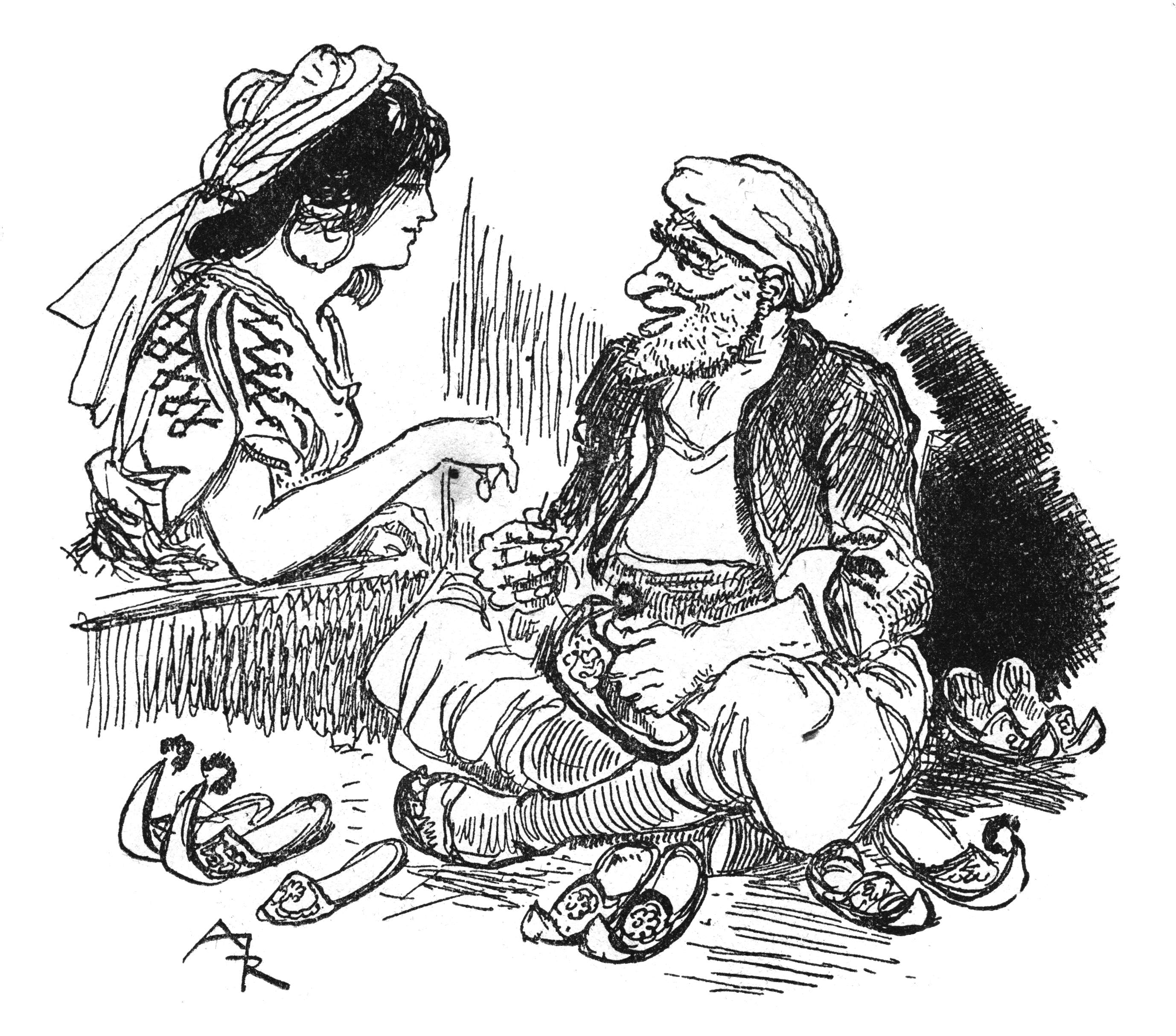
Morgiana pays Baba Mustafa the Cobbler.

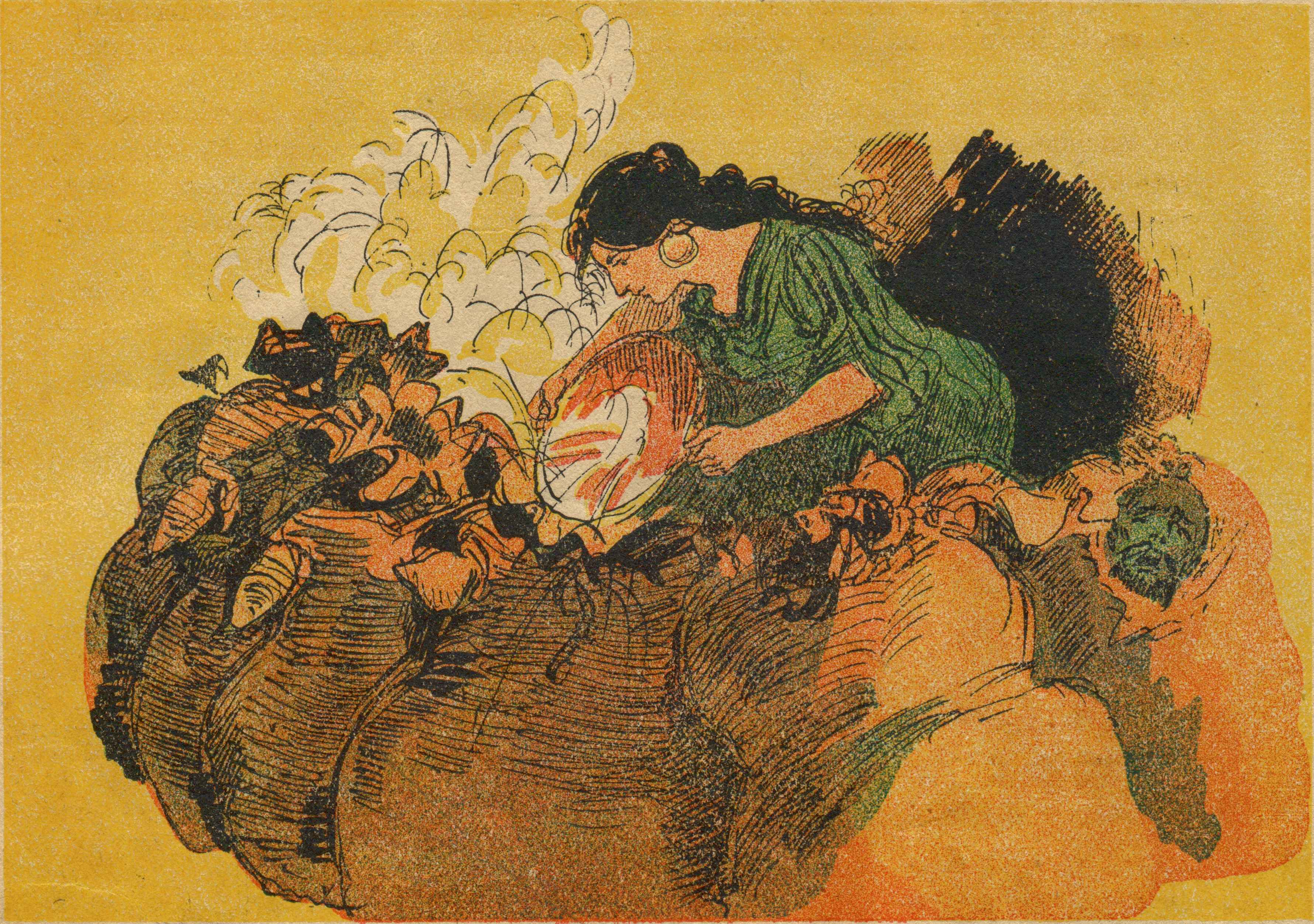
Morgiana pours boiling hot oil into the jars containing the infamous Forty Thieves.

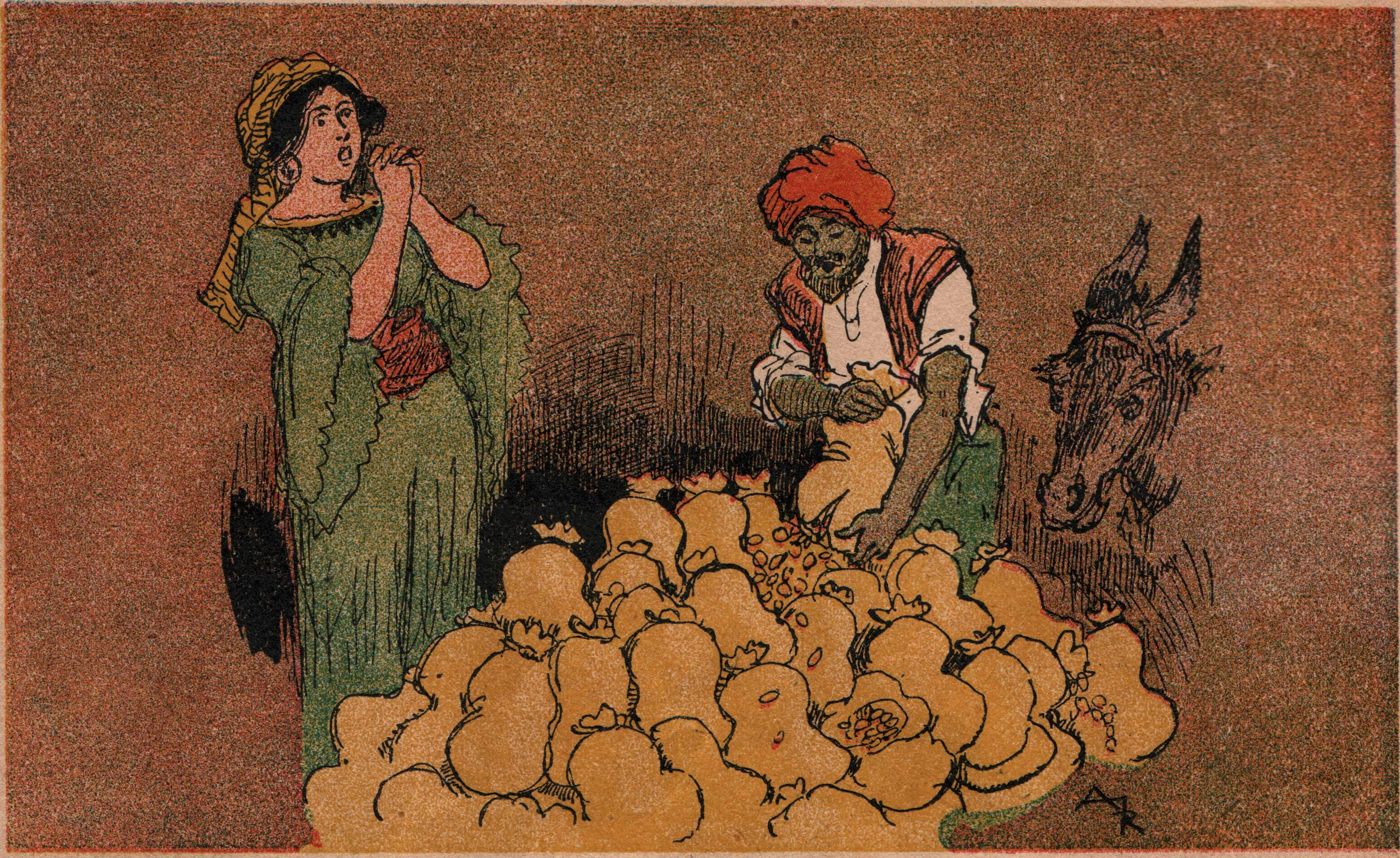
Ali Baba presents treasures from the magical cave of Sesame to Morgiana.
