= Katta Subba Rao =

Indian film director (1940–1988)

- Born: 3 January 1940
- Died: 12 July 1988 (aged 48)
- Occupation: director

Katta Subba Rao (3 January 1940 – 12 July 1988), is an Indian film director known for directing family-oriented and social movies in the Telugu film industry. Almost all the movies which he directed during his career depict the Indian family relationships with respect to issues and romance between naughty husbands and wives, Indian marriages, sons-in-law, mothers-in-law and daughters-in-law, etc.

Many of the films directed by Katta Subbarao are hit movies, namely Srirasthu Subhamasthu, Mogudu Kaavali, Gadasari Atha-Sogasari Kodalu, Kontemogudu - Penki Pellam and others. He directed the movies with popular heroes of today including N.T.R, Krishna (Telugu actor), Chiranjeevi, Shoban Babu, Chandra Mohan, Murali Mohan.

He also directed Krishna and N.T.R to act together in Vayyari Bhamalu Vagalamari Bhartalu in 1982, which happened to be a silver jubilee hit movie in Telugu cinema.

== Filmography ==
- Dasha Tiringindi (1979)
- Viyyalavaari Kayyalu (1979)
- Mogudu Kaavali (1980)
- Bangaaru Bava (1980)
- Kodallostunnaru Jagratta (1980)
- Konte Mogudu - Penki Pellam (1980)
- Pelli Gola (1980)
- Life of Sunhoo Park (1980)
- Srirasthu Subhamasthu (1981)
- Alludugaaru Zindabad (1981)
- Gadasari Atta Sogasari Kodalu (1981)
- Gharana Gangulu (1981)
- Vayyari Bhamalu Vagalamari Bhartalu (1982)
- Korukunna Mogudu (1982)
- Akka Mogudu Chelleli Kapuram (1983)
- Punyam Koddi Purushudu (1984)
