= Safed Jhooth =

- Directed by: Basu Chatterjee
- Written by: Samresh Basu
- Screenplay by: Basu Chatterjee
- Produced by: Ashim Kumar
- Starring: Ashok Kumar; Vinod Mehra; Mithu Mukherjee
- Cinematography: K. K. Mahajan
- Edited by: V. N. Mayekar
- Music by: Shyamal Mitra
- Release date: 1977
- Country: India
- Language: Hindi

Safed Jhooth is a 1977 Bollywood comedy drama film, starring Ashok Kumar, Vinod Mehra, Mithu Mukherjee in lead roles and directed by Basu Chatterjee. The movie is a remake of the 1975 Bengali film Chhutir Phandey.

== Cast ==
- Ashok Kumar as Baldev Raj Gulati
- Vinod Mehra as Vinod Thakur
- Mithu Mukherjee as Anita Thakur / Vinodini Gulati "Veenu"
- Deven Verma as Sulaiman
- Pradeep Kumar as R. S. Prakash (Special Appearance)
- Amol Palekar as Amol Palekar / Ramu (Special Appearance)
- Vidya Sinha as Kamla Gulati (Special Appearance)

== Songs ==
The music of the film was composed by Shyamal Mitra and lyrics by Yogesh.

Song	Singer
"Matwale Pal Yeh Kar Gaye"	Asha Bhosle
"Chori Chori Aaiyo Radhe"	Asha Bhosle
"Neele Ambar Ke Tale"	K. J. Yesudas
"Tere Mere Liye"	K. J. Yesudas
