= Rowdy Annayya =

1993 film by Tammareddy Bharadwaja

- Directed by: Tammareddy Bharadwaja
- Written by: Satya Murthy
- Starring: Krishna Ghattamaneni; Rambha
- Cinematography: B. N. Rao
- Music by: Vidyasagar
- Production company: Shirdi Sai Films
- Release date: 17 September 1993
- Country: India
- Language: Telugu

Rowdy Annayya (transl. Rowdy Brother) is a 1993 Indian Telugu-language action drama film written by Satya Murthy, directed by Tammareddy Bharadwaja and starring Krishna and Rambha. Vidyasagar scored and composed the film's soundtrack. The storyline of the film had similarities to Varasudochadu and was further used in Samarasimha Reddy and Athadu.

The film, set on a village backdrop, revolves around a mysterious stranger who supports the family of a benevolent Dharma Rao after the latter faces troubles at the hands of his cruel brother, Ranga Rao. The film failed at the box office.

== Plot ==
A tractor driver moves into a village and begins a crusade against the corrupt village head, Ranga Rao. As it turns out, the driver is actually a criminal lawyer who wishes to atone for his past sins.

== Cast ==
- Krishna Ghattamaneni
- Rambha
- Srikanth
- Chandra Mohan
- Roshni
- Dharmavarapu Subrahmanyam
- Ashok Kumar
- Costumes Krishna
- Balayya
- Nirmalamma
- Silk Smitha

== Music ==
Vidyasagar scored and composed the film's soundtrack with lyrics penned by Bhuvana Chandra.

1. "Chilakamma" - Mano, S.P. Sailaja
2. "Chuk Chuk" - Mano, Malgudi Subha
3. "Dhim Dhinaka" - S.P.B., S. P. Sailaja
4. "Attatta" - S.P.B., Minmini
5. "Nuvvoste" - Mano, S. P. Sailaja
6. "Jhummane" - S.P.B., K. S. Chitra
