= Mithu Mukherjee (actress) =

Indian Bengali film actress (1955–2026)

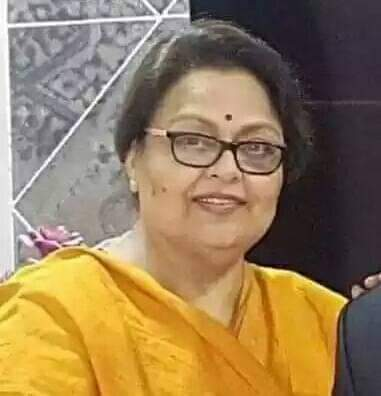
- Mithu Mukherjee
- Born: 19 June 1955; Pathuriaghata, Calcutta, West Bengal, India
- Died: 21 September 2026 (aged 71); Mumbai, Maharashtra, India
- Occupation: Actress
- Years active: 1972–1990
- Notable work: Shesh Parba; Marjina Abdulla; Mouchak; Swayamsiddha; Pratima; Sandhi; Ashrita
- Spouse: Sunil
- Relatives: Anita Guha (aunt); Ritu Das (niece)

Mithu Mukherjee (19 June 1955 – 21 September 2026) was an Indian actress who appeared in Hindi as well as Bengali cinema. She made her debut in a 1972 Bengali film Shesh Parba directed by Chitta Bose. She was catapulted to stardom after she had donned the role of Marjina in Dinen Gupta's Marjina Abdulla (1973) and sustained it with further roles in Bengali films such as Nishi Kanya (1973), Mouchak (1974), Swayamsiddha (1975), Hotel Snow Fox (1976), Bhagyachakra (1980) and Sandhi (1980). She made her Bollywood debut with Dulal Guha's Khaan Dost (1976). After her Dujane (1984) tanked at the box office, she took a sabbatical of seven years and returned to the silver screen with Chandra Barot's hugely successful commercial drama Ashrita (1990).

== Career ==
Mukherjee made her debut in 1972 Bengali hit film Shesh Parba opposite Samit Bhanja, directed by Chitta Bose. She became known after portraying Marjina, a perspicacious maid of Ali Baba, in Dinen Gupta's Blockbuster Marjina Abdulla (1973) opposite Debraj Roy. She was then featured in Ashutosh Mukherjee's Nishikanya (1973) opposite Soumitra Chattopadhyay.

In 1974, she appeared in Arabinda Mukhopadhyay's Blockbuster Mouchak opposite Ranjit Mallick. The following year, she appeared in Sunil Bandopadhyay's Kabi opposite Debraj Roy for the second time which wasn not a commercial success. The movie Swayamsiddha opposite Ranjit Mallick, her last release of that year, was a box office success.

Her career faced a major setback when two of her high-profile movies of 1976 - Hotel Snow Fox and Chander Kachhakachhi weren't commercially successful despite having Uttam Kumar in the lead.

She made her Bollywood debut with Dulal Guha's Khaan Dost (1976) opposite Shatrughan Sinha, but limited herself to Basu Chatterjee's films only. Mukherjee starred in Safed Jhooth (1977) opposite Vinod Mehra.

In 1977, she played the consort of Soumitra Chatterjee in Palash Bandopadhyay's Bengali hit Pratima. In 1978 and 1979, she was only seen in two Hindi movies directed by Basu Chatterjee - Dillagi, where she was cast opposite Shatrughan Sinha, and Do Ladke Dono Kadke opposite Navin Nischol. Both films failed to propel her career in Bollywood further. Throughout 1980, she starred in Bengali family dramas like Bhagya Chakra, Bandhan and Sandhi, which achieved moderate success. Her only release in 1981 was Bengali movie Father, where she played a deaf mute rape victim opposite Subhendu Chattopadhyay. In 1982, she acted in Dinen Gupta directed Oriya movie Jwain Pua opposite Uttam Mohanty, a remake of her Bengali film Mouchak. In 1984, she appeared in Dujane that was a commercial failure. After a one-song two scenes guest appearance in movie Prarthana, Mukherjee started shooting for her home production Ranga Bhanga Chand based on Pratibha Basu's novel of the same name in 1984. The following year, shooting stopped midway due to differences between Mukherjee and Gupta. The release was delayed by five years as the movie was left in the cans and later revived with Chandra Barot as director. At release Ranga Bhanga Chand was renamed Ashrita.

In 1990, Ashrita, in which Mukherjee starred opposite Kanwaljit Singh was very commercially successful. Ashrita was Mukherjee's final movie.

== Death ==
Mukherjee died after a long battle with cancer at Breach Candy Hospital in Mumbai, on 21 September 2026, at the age of 71.

== Filmography ==
| Year | Film | Language | Director |
|---|---|---|---|
| 1972 | Shesh Parba | Bengali | Chitta Bose |
| 1973 | Marjina Abdulla | Bengali | Dinen Gupta |
| 1973 | Nishi Kanya | Bengali | Ashutosh Bandopadhyay |
| 1974 | Mouchak | Bengali | Arabinda Mukhopadhyay |
| 1975 | Kabi | Bengali | Sunil Bandopadhyay |
| 1975 | Swayamsiddha | Bengali | Sushil Mukhopadhyay |
| 1976 | Chander Kachhakachhi | Bengali | Ashutosh Mukhopadhyay |
| 1976 | Hotel Snow Fox | Bengali | Yatrik |
| 1976 | Khaan Dost | Hindi | Dulal Guha |
| 1977 | Pratima | Bengali | Palash Bandopadhyay |
| 1977 | Safed Jhooth | Hindi | Basu Chatterjee |
| 1978 | Dillagi | Hindi | Basu Chatterjee |
| 1979 | Do Ladke Dono Kadke | Hindi | Basu Chatterjee |
| 1980 | Bhagyachakra | Bengali | Ajoy Biswas |
| 1980 | Sandhi | Bengali | Amal Dutta |
| 1980 | Bandhan | Bengali | Manu Sen |
| 1981 | Father | Bengali | Dilip Mukhopadhyay |
| 1982 | Jwain Pua | Odia | Dinen Gupta |
| 1984 | Dujane | Bengali | Ardhendu Chatterjee |
| 1984 | Prarthana | Bengali | Asit Sen |
| 1990 | Ashrita | Bengali | Chandra Barot |

== Bibliography ==
- Mitra, Alok (1991). Alok Mitra (ed.). Manorama (in Bengali). Mitra Prakashan Pvt. Ltd.
