= Vayyari Bhamalu Vagalamari Bhartalu =

1982 Indian Telugu film directed by Katta Subba Rao

- Poster
- Directed by: Katta Subba Rao
- Written by: D. V. Narasa Raju (story / dialogues)
- Screenplay by: Katta Subba Rao
- Produced by: R. V. Gurupadam
- Starring: N. T. Rama Rao; Krishna; Sridevi; Radikaa
- Cinematography: P. S. Prakash
- Edited by: Gowtham Raju
- Music by: Rajan–Nagendra
- Production company: G.R.P. Art Pictures
- Release date: 20 August 1982
- Running time: 138 mins
- Country: India
- Language: Telugu

Vayyari Bhamalu Vagalamari Bhartalu (transl. Beautiful girls, cunning husbands) is a 1982 Telugu-language comedy film, produced by R. V. Gurupadam under the G.R.P. Art Pictures banner and directed by Katta Subba Rao. A remake of the 1975 blockbuster Bengali film Mouchak, it stars N. T. Rama Rao, Krishna, Sridevi and Radhika, with music composed by Rajan–Nagendra.

== Cast ==
- N. T. Rama Rao as Peddababu Prabhakar
- Krishna as Chinnababu Diwakar
- Sridevi as Indumathi
- Radhika as Chandramathi
- Rao Gopal Rao as Somalingam
- Allu Ramalingaiah as Ramalingam
- Nutan Prasad as Prasad
- Kanta Rao as Mukunda Rao
- Mikkilineni as Sambaiah Tata
- Pandari Bai as Shantamma
- S. Varalakshmi as Seetamma
- Rama Prabha as Girija

== Soundtrack ==
Vayyari Bhamalu Vagalamari Bhartalu

Film score by Rajan–Nagendra
- Released: 1982
- Genre: Soundtrack
- Length: 28:09
- Label: AVM Audio
- Producer: Rajan–Nagendra

Music composed by Rajan–Nagendra. Lyrics were written by Veturi. Music released by AVM Audio Company.

S. No.	Song title	Singers	length
1	"Aadave Raja Hamsa"	S. P. Balasubrahmanyam, P. Susheela	6:15
2	"Konge Thagilindhe"	S. P. Balasubrahmanyam, P. Susheela	4:24
3	"Meghaala Pandhirilona"	S. P. Balasubrahmanyam, P. Susheela	4:31
4	"Kottha Pelli Kodukune"	S. P. Balasubrahmanyam, P. Susheela	4:24
5	"Yavvanamantha"	S. P. Balasubrahmanyam, P. Susheela	4:09
6	"Vayyari Bhaamave"	S. P. Balasubrahmanyam, P. Susheela	4:26
