= Marjina Abdulla =

1973 film

- Directed by: Dinen Gupta
- Starring: Shambhu Bhattacharya; Shekhar Chatterjee; Menaka Devi; Gita Dey; Utpal Dutt; Santosh Dutta; Rabi Ghosh; Kajal Gupta; Preeti Majumdar; Mithu Mukherjee; Debraj Roy; Jahor Roy
- Music by: Salil Choudhury
- Release date: 1973
- Country: India
- Language: Bengali

Marjina Abdulla is a 1973 Indian Bengali-language action-adventure film based on Ali Baba and the Forty Thieves directed by Dinen Gupta. The film stars Utpal Dutt, Santosh Dutta, Mithu Mukherjee, Rabi Ghosh and Debraj Roy in the lead roles and features music composed by Salil Choudhury.

== Cast ==
- Mithu Mukherjee as Marjina
- Rabi Ghosh as Abdullah
- Debraj Roy as Hossain
- Santosh Dutta as Alibaba
- Utpal Dutt Chieftain of 39 thieves
- Shekhar Chatterjee as Qasim
- Menaka Devi
- Gita Dey as Fatima
- Kajal Gupta as Sakina
- Preeti Majumdar
- Shambhu Bhattacharya
- Jahor Roy as Baba Mustafa

== Soundtrack ==
The music for the film was composed by Salil Chowdhury. Lyrics also written by him. He won the state award for the music for this film.

Songs

- Haay Haay Praan Jaay - Lata Mangeshkar
- Baje Go Beena - Manna Dey
- Maar Jharu Maar - Sabita Chowdhury, Anup Ghoshal
- O Bhai Re Bhai - Manna Dey, Chorus
