= Open sesame =

Magical phrase in the story of "Ali Baba and the Forty Thieves"

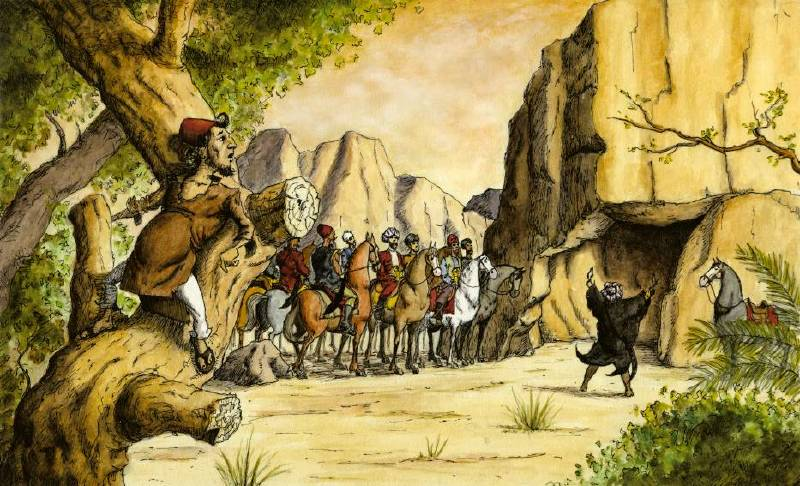
Ali Baba overhearing one of the thieves saying "Open Sesame".

"Open sesame" (French: Sésame, ouvre-toi; Arabic: افتح يا سمسم, romanized: iftaḥ yā simsim) is a magical phrase in the story of "Ali Baba and the Forty Thieves" in Antoine Galland's version of One Thousand and One Nights. It opens the mouth of a cave in which forty thieves have hidden a treasure.

== Etymology ==
The phrase first appears in Antoine Galland's French translation of One Thousand and One Nights (1704–1717) as Sésame, ouvre-toi (English, "Sesame, open yourself"). In the story, Ali Baba overhears one of the forty thieves saying "open sesame". His brother later cannot remember the phrase, and confuses it with the names of grains other than sesame, becoming trapped in the magic cave.

Galland's phrase has been variously translated from the French into English as "Sesame, open", "Open, sesame" and "Open, O sesame". "Open sesame" is the conventional arrangement, however.

Sesame seeds grow in a seed pod that splits open when it reaches maturity, and the phrase possibly alludes to unlocking of treasures. Babylonian magic practices used sesame oil. It is not certain, however, if the word "sesame" actually refers to the sesame plant or seed. Sesame may be a reduplication of the Hebrew šem 'name', i.e., God, or a kabbalistic word representing the Talmudic šem-šāmayīm ("shem-shamayim"), 'name of heaven'.

== Classification ==
Open sesame has been classified by Stith Thompson as motif element D1552.2, "Mountain opens to magic formula".

== See also ==
- Abracadabra
- Barbarous names
- Hocus pocus

== Bibliography ==
- (in English) Paul Haupt, "Open Sesame" in Beiträge zur assyriologie und semitischen Sprachwissenschaft 10:2, 1927, p. 165ff. Originally presented at the meeting of the American Oriental Society, Washington, April 15, 1916.
