= Kothala Raayudu =

- Theatrical release poster
- Directed by: K. Vasu
- Produced by: Tammareddy Bharadwaja
- Starring: Chiranjeevi; Madhavi; Giribabu; Nirmalamma; Manju Bhargavi
- Music by: J. V. Raghavulu
- Release date: 15 September 1979
- Country: India
- Language: Telugu

Kothala Raayudu is a Telugu-language film directed by K. Vasu and starring Chiranjeevi and Madhavi. The film was a box office success.

== Plot ==
Satyam is the youngest son of a retired judge and youngest brother of a Police officer and a lawyer. His father believes that he is fit for nothing as he spends most of his time hanging out with his friends and chasing after girls. He sees Padma, who teaches his brother's kids and tries every trick to woo her. He manages to convince her that he is in love with her and promises to marry soon. Padma becomes pregnant and Satyam refuses to marry her. Meanwhile, he realizes that his father is being blackmailed by a bar manager (K. V. Chalam), as he has his father's photos with a dancer (Manju Bhargavi). To save his reputation, his father heeds the bar manager's demands. Satyam, with his friends, gets hold of the bar manager and in an attempt to teach him a lesson, the dancer dies. Satyam is accused of murder and he does not try to defend himself, as he feels that he needs to be punished for all his misdeeds. His father passes away when Satyam is sentenced to jail. When Satyam is released after his brothers prove his innocence, Padma, along with their child, is accepted by his family.

== Cast ==
- Chiranjeevi as Satyanarayana aka Satyam
- Madhavi as Padma
- Giri Babu as Inspector Ramu, Ranga Rao's 1st son
- Hema Sundar as Retd. Judge Ranga Rao, Satyam's father
- Chakrapani as Lawyer Ravi, Ranga Rao's 2nd son
- K.V. Chalam as Kumar
- Nirmalamma as Parvathi, Satyam's mother
- Manju Bhargavi as Lily
- Sarathi as Sarathi, Satyam's friend
- K. Vijaya as Poorna
- R. Narayana Murthy as Rambabu, Satyam's friend
- Baby Tulasi as Paapa, Satyam's niece

== Soundtrack ==
No.	Title	Music	Singer(s)	Length
1.	"Endaa Vaana Pellaade"	K. Chakravarthy	S. P. Balasubrahmanyam, S.P. Sailaja
2.	"Go Go Go"	K. Chakravarthy	S. Janaki, S. P. Balasubrahmanyam
3.	"Oka Nelavanka"	K. Chakravarthy	S. P. Balasubrahmanyam
4.	"Pubvuloy Puvvulu"	K. Chakravarthy	S. Janaki, S. P. Balasubrahmanyam
