= Mouchak =

- Directed by: Arabinda Mukhopadhyay
- Written by: Samaresh Basu
- Screenplay by: Bharat Shumsher, Jung Bahadur Rana, Arabinda Mukhopadhyay
- Based on: Aboseshe story by Samaresh Basu
- Produced by: Bharat Shumsher, Jung Bahadur Rana
- Starring: Uttam Kumar; Sabitri Chatterjee; Ranjit Mullick; Mithu Mukherjee; Anup Kumar; Chinmoy Roy; Robi Ghosh
- Cinematography: Kanai Dey
- Edited by: Amiya Mukherjee
- Music by: Nachiketa Ghosh
- Production company: Srimati Pictures
- Distributed by: Piyali Pictures
- Release date: 10 January 1975
- Country: India
- Language: Bengali

Mouchak is a Bengali romantic comedy film directed by Arabinda Mukhopadhyay. The film stars Uttam Kumar, Sabitri Chatterjee, Ranjit Mullick, Mithu Mukherjee, Sulata Chowdhury, Ratna Ghoshal, and Nripati Chattopadhyay in lead roles. Nachiketa Ghosh scored the music in the film. The film was released on 10 January 1975. It was remade into Hindi as Damaad (1978) and into Telugu as Vayyari Bhamalu Vagalamari Bhartalu.

== Plot ==
Eligible bachelor Sitesh Roy lives with his elder brother Nitish and sister-in-law in Kolkata. He gets a job in a jute mill, which is seventy miles away from his house which is in the suburbs of the city and so he decides to rent a house near his office. Within the next few days, he becomes frantic with the marriage proposals from local residents. Everyone including his office boss coaxes him to marry their aged daughters (a satirical take on Indira Gandhi's administrative campaign on birth control set in the aftermath of the 1971 Indo-Pakistani War during which many young men had been enlisted into the army, thereby causing a hypothetical increase in the number of unmarried girls, who were seen as a burden by their conservative families) population and numerous funny incidents start rolling. However, Sitesh falls for Neepa, a headstrong, smart girl who lives opposite to Sitesh's apartment, who also falls in love with him. In the meantime, to save his brother from the hands of crazy fathers, Sitesh starts a smear campaign against his brother. As a result, Neepa's headmaster father does not approve of the love affair and the couple start making plans to flee & marry. Later, Nitish and his wife come to Sitesh's flat over a false alarm and come know about his love affair with Neepa. After a huge drama and laugh riot, Neepa confess her love, Sitesh is proven innocent and everything is solved with a happy ending.

== Cast ==
- Uttam Kumar as Nitish Roy
- Sabitri Chatterjee as Nitish's Wife
- Ranjit Mallick as Sitesh Roy
- Ajoy Bandyopadhyay
- Mithu Mukherjee as Neepa
- Shekhar Chattopadhyay as Mr. Chowdhury
- Gita Dey as Chowdhury's wife
- Robi Ghosh as Panchu
- Ratna Ghoshal as Champa
- Nripati Chattopadhyay
- Anup Kumar as Talukder
- Chinmoy Ray as Radhika
- Gurudas Bandyopadhyay as Neepa's Father
- Tapati Ghosh as Neepa's Mother
- Sulata Chowdhury as Leena, Chowdhury's Daughter
- Tarun Kumar as D R Ghoshal
- Moni Shrimani
- Durgadas Bandyopadhyay (Jr.) as Sukhamay Banerjee
- Kamu Mukherjee as kallu
- Haridhan Mukhopadhyay
- Amarnath Mukhopadhyay as Dr Gupta
- Samar Kumar

== Soundtrack ==
Mouchak

Soundtrack album by Nachiketa Ghosh
- Released: 1974
- Recorded: 1973
- Studio: Srimati Pictures
- Length: 0:12:47
- Label: Angle Digital Pvt Ltd
- Producers: Bharat Shumsher, Jung Bahadur Rana

All the songs are composed by Nachiketa Ghosh. The lyrics are written by Gauriprasanna Majumder and Shyamal Gupta.

Songs
No.	Title	Singers(s)	Length
1.	"E Bar Mole Suto Habo"	Manna Dey	3:13
2.	"Ta Bole Ki Prem Debe Na"	Manna Dey	3:00
3.	"Paglaa Gaarod Kothay"	Manna Dey, Asha Bhosle	3:24
4.	"Besh Korechi Prem Korechi"	Asha Bhosle	3:10
Total length:			12:47
