= Khaan Dost =

- Movie Poster
- Directed by: Dulal Guha
- Written by: Subhash Ghai (Story); Bharat B. Bhalla (Story); Jainendra Jain (Dialogue)
- Produced by: Pawan Kumar; Yogi
- Starring: Raj Kapoor; Shatrughan Sinha; Mithu Mukherjee; Yogeeta Bali
- Cinematography: M. Rajaram
- Edited by: Bimal Roy
- Music by: Kalyanji Anandji
- Release date: 23 March 1976 (India)
- Running time: 2 hours 37 min
- Country: India
- Language: Hindi

Khaan Dost is a 1976 Bollywood action film directed by Dulal Guha. The film was remade in Telugu as Mosagadu.

== Plot ==
Naive, simple-minded Ramdin Pandey lives a poor lifestyle in Nasik, India, along with his sister, Shanti, and works as a Havaldar in the Nasik Central Jail. He arranges Shanti's marriage, but the prospective groom's family want Rs.5000/- which he is unable to afford. To make matters worse, due to his simplistic job performance he has not been promoted. Then their jail gets a new inmate, the dreaded Rehmat Khan, who has been found guilty of killing Ranga for allegedly attempting to molest his prostitute mistress, Zareena. Rehmat finds out about Ramdin's weakness, befriends him and then uses him to escape on the pretext of visiting his ailing mother in Bombay, and never returns. A furious Jailor, Sharma, asks Ramdin to travel to Bombay, locate Rehmat, and then return or else he will not only lose his job, but also be prosecuted. A hapless Ramdin agrees to do so - little knowing that soon he will be at the mercy of the cunning and cruel Rehmat as well as Ranga's vengeful brother, Jaggi.

== Cast ==
- Raj Kapoor as Constable Ramdin Pandey
- Shatrughan Sinha as Rehmat Khan
- Mithu Mukherjee as Zareena
- Yogeeta Bali as Shanti Pandey
- Satyendra Kapoor as Jailor Sharma
- Sulochana Latkar as Mrs. Khan
- Asit Sen as Inspector Chaubey
- Jagdish Raj as Mohan
- Maruti as Hitler
- Chandulal

== Soundtrack ==
| # | Title | Singer(s) |
|---|---|---|
| 1 | "Meri Zindagi Mujhpe Roye" | Manna Dey |
| 2 | "Yeh Zindagi Tujhpe Na Roye" | Manna Dey |
| 3 | "Kaahe Ki Dosti, Kaahe Ki Yaari" | Kishore Kumar |
| 4 | "Har Saal Humne To Suna Charcha" | Kishore Kumar, Mahendra Kapoor |
