= Ashrita (film) =

- Directed by: Chandra Barot
- Screenplay by: Prathapratim Chowdhury
- Story by: Pratibha Basu
- Produced by: Bela Film International
- Starring: Mithu Mukherjee; Kanwaljit Singh; Prema Narayan
- Cinematography: Dilip Dutta
- Edited by: Ardhendu Chattopadhyay
- Music by: Hridaynath Mangeshkar
- Release date: 19 October 1990
- Country: India
- Language: Bengali

Ashrita is a Bengali romance drama film directed by Chandra Barot based on Ranga Bhanga Chand, a story by Pratibha Basu. It was released on 19 October 1990 under the banner of Bela Film International. Ashrita was the final film appearance of actress Mithu Mukhopadhyay. After a break from acting she returned to the screen with the film in 1990 and did not reappear. The film was originally associated with the title Ranga Bhanga Chand before being released as Ashrita.

== Cast ==
- Mithu Mukherjee
- Kanwaljit Singh
- Prema Narayan
- Mac Mohan
- Shashi Puri
- Manjula Das
- Alpana Gupta
