= Mogudu Kaavali =

- Directed by: Katta Subba Rao
- Screenplay by: Katta Subba Rao
- Story by: Raja Nawathe
- Produced by: Thammareddy V.K.
- Starring: Chiranjeevi; Gayatri; Nutan Prasad; Kavitha
- Cinematography: P. Chengaiah
- Edited by: Adurthi Harinath
- Music by: J. V. Raghavulu
- Production company: Charitha Chitra
- Release date: 15 October 1980
- Country: India
- Language: Telugu

Mogudu Kaavali (transl. Need Husband) is a 1980 Telugu-language film starring Chiranjeevi. It is a remake of Uttam Kumar's 1966 film Shudhu Ekti Bachhar.

== Plot ==
Krishna (Gayatri) has inherited a substantial fortune from her father, who stipulated that she must marry in order to claim it. Reluctant to marry a prince who might prove to be unsuitable, especially after witnessing her friend Shanthi's troubled marriage, Krishna is determined to keep her father's wealth. She hires Chiru as a temporary husband to fulfill the condition and access her inheritance. To her astonishment and shock, Chiru turns out to be much more than she expected. The rest of the story unfolds as Chiru's true nature transforms Krishna's life.

== Cast ==
- Chiranjeevi as Chiru
- Gayatri as Krishnaveni
- Kavitha
- Nutan Prasad as Sundaram
- J. V. Ramana Murthi as Sankaram
- S. Varalakshmi as Parvati
- Suvarna as Santhi

== Soundtrack ==
All songs were written by Veturi Sundararama Murthy.

"Aadapillaki Eedoste"
"Aakasamlo Tarakalu"
"Naa Manase Madhurapuram"
"O Chilaka Paluke"
"Saachi Kodite"
"Sannajaji Sanditlo"
