= Nadiya Ke Paar (1982 film) =

1982 Indian film by Govind Moonis

- Poster
- Directed by: Govind Moonis
- Written by: Keshav Prasad Mishra
- Based on: Kohbar Ki Shart by Keshav Prasad Mishra
- Produced by: Tarachand Barjatya
- Starring: Sachin Pilgaonkar; Sadhana Singh
- Cinematography: Sunil Sharma
- Music by: Ravindra Jain
- Distributed by: Rajshri Productions
- Release date: 10 October 1982
- Running time: 143 minutes
- Country: India
- Language: Hindi (Note: Spoken with/in a strong Bhojpuri and Awadhi accent. Jagran.com called it a "hybrid of Bhojpuri and Awadhi dialects which are spoken in the central and eastern regions of Bihar and Uttar Pradesh." In another article of Jagran.com written by Radha Krishna in 2025, it was mentioned as a Bhojpuri film. India Today called it a "bhojpuri classic." Sachin Pilgaonkar in an interview said, "Nadiya Ke Paar was not a Bhojpuri film, it was a Hindi film, but it had Awadhi language which is spoken in some districts of UP, especially those which fall in Purvanchal.")
- Budget: ₹18 lakh
- Box office: ₹5.4 crore

Nadiya Ke Paar (Hindi pronunciation: ['nədɪjɑː 'keː 'paːr]; transl. Across The River) is a 1982 Indian drama film directed by Govind Moonis. Based on the first half of the novel Kohbar Ki Shart by Keshav Prasad Mishra. It featured an ensemble cast comprising Sachin, Sadhana Singh, Inder Thakur, Mitali, Savita Bajaj, Sheela David, Leela Mishra and Soni Rat.

Set in Jaunpur, Uttar Pradesh, the film was primarily shot in the Bijaipur and Rajepur villages of Kerakat tehsil. The film was released in 1982 by Rajshri Productions and was one of the highest-grossing films of 1982. Rajshri later remade the film in 1994 as Hum Aapke Hain Koun..!. The film draws on the rural setting of the novel Kohbar ki Shart, which is set in the Bhojpur region of eastern Uttar Pradesh, particularly in the villages of Balihar and Chaube Chhapra in Ballia district.

== Plot ==
Tiwari, a farmer from eastern Uttar Pradesh, lives in a village with his two nephews, Omkar and Chandan. He falls ill and is treated by a Vaidya (herbal medical practitioner) from another village across the river. When the farmer feels okay, he asks the Vaidya about his fees. The Vaidya, who is a father of two daughters, Roopa and Gunja, asks for the farmer's elder nephew, Omkar, to marry his elder daughter, Roopa. The farmer readily agrees.

The marriage takes place, and Omkar's house is filled with joy and happiness with Roopa's arrival. Chandan and Gunja are seen bickering and teasing each other all the time. Soon, Roopa gets pregnant and gives birth to a baby boy. Since there is no other female in the house, Roopa asks Omkar to call Gunja for some time to support her in household chores. Everyone agrees happily, and Chandan visits his sister-in-law's village to bring Gunja home. During this journey, both of them sing happy songs and become friends. There is some liking that starts brewing between them. Gunja bonds with everyone in the family and takes up all the responsibilities of the house. Chandan and Gunja eventually begin to fall in love.

After a few months, Gunja leaves for her home with a heavy heart. Chandan keeps coming up with excuses to go and meet her. However, Gunja takes a promise from Chandan to only come to her as her groom. While visiting her parents a couple of months later, Roopa learns about their love. She promises to talk to everyone at home and arrange their marriage alliance. Unfortunately, she dies in an accident while she is still at her parents' house, and never gets the chance to tell everyone.

Time passes, and Omkar's life turns into despair and sadness without Roopa. In order to bring happiness back into his life and a mother for his child, his uncle and Roopa's father suggest that Omkar marry Gunja. Chandan is unable to tell anyone about his love for Gunja and remains silent for his brother's life. Gunja confusingly thinks her father has arranged her wedding with Chandan and gets extremely happy. Things take a different turn when she sees her brother-in-law, Omkar, dressed up as the groom on the wedding day. She believes that Chandan cheated her and agrees to marry Omkar for her father's reputation. Despite trying to control her emotions, she faints during the wedding rituals. Chandan tries to explain his situation to Gunja in private. He makes her understand that he decided to sacrifice his love for his brother. He tells her that he thought that Gunja would trust him and support him in this decision. Gunja starts to think highly of Chandan after hearing all this and assures him that she will support his decision now. Right then, Omkar enters the room, having heard this entire conversation. He disapproves of this huge sacrifice of theirs and informs their families of their love. Gunja and Chandan get married with their families' blessings.

== Cast ==
- Sachin Pilgaonkar as Chandan Tiwari; Omkar's younger brother
- Sadhana Singh as Gunja Tiwari; Vaidji's youngest daughter; Roopa's younger sister
- Inder Thakur as Omkar Tiwari
- Mitali as Roopa Tiwari; Vaidji's elder daughter; Gunja's elder sister; Omkar's wife; Chandhan sister in - law.
- Vishnukumar Vyas as Vaidji (Gunja and Roopa's father)
- Leela Mishra as Kaki
- Ram Mohan Sharma as Tiwari (the farmer) (Uncle of Omkar and Chandan)
- Sheela Sharma as Rajjo (Chandan's childhood friend)
- Ranjana Sachdev as Gunja's mother

== Soundtrack ==
The soundtrack of the album was composed by Ravindra Jain, also wrote the lyrics of the songs.

Nadiya Ke Paar track listing
No.	Title	Singer(s)	Length
1.	"Jogi Ji Dheere Dheere"	Hemlata, Jaspal Singh, Chandrani Mukherjee, Sushil Kumar & chorus	08:14
2.	"Kaun Disaa Mein Le Ke Chalaa Re Batohiyaa"	Hemlata and Jaspal Singh	06:44
3.	"Jab Tak Poore Na Ho Phere Saat"	Hemlata and Chorus	05:51
4.	"Sanchi Kahe Tore Aavan Se"	Jaspal Singh	05:05
5.	"Gunja Re Chandan"	Suresh Wadkar and Hemlata	05:09
6.	"Jab Tak Poore Na Ho Phere Saat (Sad)"	Hemlata and Chorus	01:34
Total length:			32:27
