= Hamara Sansar =

- Directed by: T. Prakash Rao
- Produced by: K. G. Bhatt
- Starring: Parikshit Sahni; Nutan; Mithun Chakraborty; Sarika
- Music by: Ravindra Jain
- Release date: 1978
- Country: India
- Language: Hindi

Hamara Sansar (transl. Our world) is a 1978 Indian Hindi-language film directed by T. Prakash Rao produced under Usha Productions, starring Parikshit Sahni, Nutan, Mithun Chakraborty and Sarika.

== Cast ==
- Parikshit Sahni as Pratap
- Nutan as Geeta
- Mithun Chakraborty as Prem
- Sarika as Roopa
- Agha
- Aruna Irani
- Shashikala
- Om Prakash as Harishchandra
- Padmini Kolhapure as Asha

== Plot ==
The story of the film revolves around two brothers who get estranged due to an unfortunate incident. In order to end the feud, the younger sibling, who is a budding singer, sets out to find his older brother.

== Soundtrack ==
Song	Singer
"Ek Phool Aur Ek Moti Se"	Mahendra Kapoor, Hemlata
"Taji Taji Lelo Bhaji"	Asha Bhosle
"Zulfen Jo Munh Pe"	Asha Bhosle, Manna Dey
"Nari O Nari"	Manna Dey
"Lal Gulabi Phoolon Se"	K. J. Yesudas
"Paisa Do Paisa, Aana Do Aana"	Hemlata, Chandrani Mukherjee
