= Paheli (1977 film) =

1977 film by Prashanta Nanda

- Directed by: Prashant Nanda
- Produced by: Tarachand Barjatya; Rajshri Productions
- Starring: Satyajeet; Nameeta Chandra; Durga Khote; Arun Govil; A. K. Hangal; Dina Pathak
- Music by: Ravindra Jain (with lyrics)
- Release date: 1977 (India)
- Country: India
- Language: Hindi

Paheli (translation: riddle) is a 1977 Indian Hindi-language film produced by Tarachand Barjatya for Rajshri Productions. This family drama was directed by Prashant Nanda with Satyajeet and Nameeta Chandra playing the lead characters.

Arun Govil, Nameeta Chandra, Poornima Jayaram, Neena Mahapatra and Anita Singh were debutants to Bollywood screen in this film and Suresh Wadkar as playback singer.

== Plot ==
Brij Mohan (Nitin Sethi) leaves his home in a village to live in Mumbai. His mother (Durga Khote) prefers to stay alone in their palatial home. Brij gets married. His wife gives birth and passes away soon after. After few years, Brij is an established businessman and his son Montu (Satyajeet) is studying in his final year in school. He asks Montu to visit his grandmother, which he agrees to reluctantly, provided his friends accompany him. The group faces many problems on the way and when they reach the village. Hence, his friends return to Bombay, leaving Montu with his grandmother. Montu becomes friends with a vivacious village girl Gauri (Nameeta Chandra), an orphan living with her cruel aunt, and two equally brutal cousins. Montu and Gauri's friendship blossoms and they meet regularly. He also meets a struggling farmer Balram (Arun Govil), his mother (Leela Mishra), and his fiancée Kanak (Abha Dhulia). Balram would like to go to the city and earn money for his marriage, to which his mother refuses. Against his expectations, Montu finds village life interesting and promises his grandmother to return the next year.

After a year, he finds significant changes in the village. Balram has married and left the village. His ailing mother has died. Gauri refuses to speak with him, while her uncle and aunt are looking for a suitable groom to get her married to. Does Montu understand and appreciate changes in the village against the city life, where he has grown up, and visit his grandmother again?

== Cast ==
- Satyajeet - Montu
- Nameeta Chandra - Gauri
- Nitin Sethi - Brij Mohan
- Durga Khote - Brij Mohan's mother
- Arun Govil - Balram
- Leela Mishra - Balram's mother
- A. K. Hangal - Masterji
- Dina Pathak - Masterji's wife
- Birbal - Birbal, Chauffeur
- Abha Dhulia - Kanak
- Shivraj - Vaidji, Kanak's father
- Poornima Jayaram - Champa
- Neena Mahapatra - Roopa
- Anita Singh - Rekha
- Abka Chuliya

== Songs ==
1. "Kanha Ki Zid Par Nachegi Radha, Chaye Aaye Na Aaye Nachna" - Hemlata, Chandrani Mukherjee
2. "Saheli Ho Paheli Pucchho, O Shari Babu Paheli Bujho" - Suresh Wadkar, Hemlata, Chandrani Mukherjee
3. "Manmohak Ye Pyara Pyara Gaon" - Suresh Wadkar, Hemlata
4. "Jaane Kaisi Bahen Ye Hawa, Mujhe Hone Laga Hai Nasha" - Suresh Wadkar
5. "Tan Bhije Mora Man Bhije Mujh Se Ched Kare Furvai" - Hemlata
6. "Sonaa Kare Jhil Mil Jhil Mil" - Hemlata, Suresh Wadkar
