= Hemlata (singer) =

Musical artist (born 1954)

- Hemlata in 1990

Background information
- Also known as: Hemlata, Hemalatha, Hemlata Bali
- Born: Lata Bhatt; 16 August 1954 (age 72) Hyderabad, India
- Origin: Rajasthan, India
- Genres: Playback singing, Hindustani Classical Music, Bhajans
- Occupation: Playback singer
- Instrument: Vocals
- Years active: 1968–present

Hemlata (born 16 August 1954) is an Indian classically trained playback singer in Bollywood. She is best known for her songs in the late 1970s, especially Ankhiyon Ke Jharokhon Se song.

She was nominated for Filmfare Best Female Playback Award five times in the period of 1977–81 and won once for Chitchor in 1977 for her classical rendition of "Tu Jo Mere Sur Mein" which was duet with K.J. Yesudas, composed by Ravindra Jain.

== Early life and background ==
Hemlata was born in Hyderabad as Lata Bhatt into an Marwari Brahmin family and spent her childhood in Calcutta.

She was married to Yogesh Bali, the younger brother of Indian film actress Yogeeta Bali. Her husband died in 1988 after a prolonged illness. She lives with her son Aditya.

== Career ==
=== Leading career ===
Hemlata is a classical trained singer after her father and guru, Pt. Jaichand Bhatt.Later she moved to Mumbai from Calcutta. There she got her first song Usha Khanna, Later she started her unstoppable journey with Kalyan Anandji, Lakshmikant Pyarelal.She sang with Mohammad Rafi, Kishore Kumar, Mukesh, legendary singers Lata Mangeshkar and Asha Bhosle.Hemlata is very known for her versatile singing like qawwali, light songs ghazals, bhajan and many more. Later, in association with Ravindra Jain, she had worked on many other songs. Among them is "Ankhiyon Ke Jharokhon Se". According to the Binaca Geet Mala (a radio show that used to compile records of album sales), it became the number one song in the year 1978. Hemlata was also nominated for Filmfare award for the best female playback singer for this song. It has received millions of views on YouTube. Hemlata sang on Jain's cassette album Sahaj Dhara (1991) dedicated to Shri Mataji Nirmala Devi, and sang songs from this album in two concerts in Brussels, Belgium in July 1992.

In the 1990s, Doordarshan had invited her to perform "Tista Nadi Si Tu Chanchala"

=== Performing career and albums ===
She has lent her voice for Ramanand Sagar's epics T.V. Serial Ramayan (She also appeared herself in one episode to perform traditional Meera Bhajan Payoji Maine Ram Ratan Dhan Payoji), as well as Uttar Ramayan (Luv Kush) and Shri Krishna throughout the series.

She also rendered the Italian song "'O sole mio" in concert in Italy during Easter 1992.

Regarding these three albums, only Sarhadein was released by Tips.

She was the only one Bollywood singer, who has been selected by the world community of Sikhs and the government of Punjab as well as the Holy Akal Takht to perform Gurmat Sangeet live composed in original Ragas for the celebration of 300 years of Sikh Khalsa Panth at Shri Anandpur Sahib Akal Takht on 13 April 1999. Kini Tera Ant Na Paya was the only one album of Sikh Sangeet which was especially in her voice and inaugurated by the honourable Chief Minister of Punjab Shri Prakash Singh Badal and attended and blessed by honourable Prime Minister of India Shri Atal Bihari Vajpayee.

In November 2010, she was in news for filing FIR against the mother in law of Sonali Bendre for cheating Hemlata in a case of selling a bungalow in Lokhandwala, for Rs.25 million.

== Awards and nominations ==
Year	Nominee / work	Award	Result
1977	"Tu Jo Mere Sur Mein" (Chitchor)	Filmfare Award for Best Female Playback Singer	Won
1977	"Sun Ke Teri Pukar" (Fakira)	Filmfare Award for Best Female Playback Singer	Nominated
1979	"Ankhiyon Ke Jharokhon Se" (Ankhiyon Ke Jharokhon Se)	Filmfare Award for Best Female Playback Singer	Nominated
1980	"Megha O Re Megha" (Sunayana)	Filmfare Award for Best Female Playback Singer	Nominated
1981	"Tu Is Tarah Se Meri Zindagi Mein Shaamil Hai" (Aap To Aise Na The)	Filmfare Award for Best Female Playback Singer	Nominated

== Filmography ==
=== 2000s ===
Year	Song name	Film name	Co-singer	Music director	Lyricist	Lang
2016	"Tip Tip Barse Jab Barsat"	Na Hum Jo Keh De	Abhinanda Sarkar	Dilip Dutta	-	Hindi
2015	"Maa Mujhe Aane De"	Beti Bachao Beti Padhao	Solo	Hemant Mehta	Hemant Mehta	Hindi
2008	"Hey Ganga Maai Hum Hain Tohaar Parchhai", "Kaga Bole Kaon Kaon"	Gaon Ki Ganga	Solo	C. L. John	Ajeet Yadav	Bhojpuri
1991	"Nidharma Larkayera Saptarangi Tiko"	Bijaya Parajaya	Solo	Sambhujeet Baskota	Dinesh Adhikari	Nepali
1991	"Fagun Bhar Baba Laage Devarva"	Rang Barse	Shabbir Kumar	Bhushan Dua	Traditional	Bhojpuri
2002	"Tumhara Pyar Bhulaoon To", "Jeevan Main Aisey", "Toba Ye Naz Aur Ye Addayen", "Mujhe Dard Deke"	Sarhadein (Album)	Attaullah Khan Essa Khailwi	Attaullah Khan, Afzal Ajiz, Sabbir Ali	–	-
2002	"Pyar Ki Galiyan"	Sarhadein (Album)	Solo	Attaullah Khan, Afzal Ajiz, Sabbir Ali	–	-

=== 1990s ===
Year	Song name	Film name	Co-singer	Music director	Lyricist	Lang
2000	"Man Saari Umar"	Ganga Kare Insaaf	Solo	Azeez Banarasi	Ravindra Jain	Bhojpuri
1999	"Shono Chandannagare"	Tomay Pabo Bole	Bappi Lahiri	Bappi Lahiri	Pulak Bandopadhyay	Bengali
1997	"Munhwa Se Kaise Bataai Ho", "Roop Mora Chaani Badan Mora Sona", "Baat Kahiyo Na Kahiyo Jaroor Hoi", "Jaane Kahaan Bindiya Hera Gaili	Nehiya Lagvani Saiyan Se	Solo	Surender Kohli	Arjun Pathak, Vedehi Sharan Sharma, Anjaan, Vedehi Sharan Sharma	Bhojpuri
1997	"Dekho Ji"	Mohabbat Kya Hai	Vinod Rathod	Rajan Bawa	Rajan Bawa	Hindi
1997	"Bigadi Ke Banane Mein"	Shaan-e-khwaja – 2	Solo	Mami Bhachu	Anwar Farrukhabadi	Urdu
1995	"Shyam Baba"	Kalyug Ke Avtaar	Mohammad Aziz	Ravindra Jain	Ravindra Jain	Hindi
1995	"Saj Ke Aayi"	Parbatiya Banal Panditayain Bitiya Bhail	Usha Mangeshkar	Chitragupta	Anjaan	Bhojpuri
1995	"Jekhanete Jaai Ami 1"	Bhagya Debata	Abhijeet	Madhu Burman	Pulak Bandopadhyay	Bengali
1995	"Jekhanete Jaai Ami 2"	Bhagya Debata	Solo	Madhu Burman	Pulak Bandopadhyay	Bengali
1995	"E Raat Jeno Kichhu Balte Chay"	Bhagya Debata	Udit Narayan	Madhu Burman	Pulak Bandopadhyay	Bengali
1995	"Rimjhim Rimjhim"	Tera Dukh Mera Dukh	Suresh Wadkar	Rajan-Arvind	Rajan	Hindi
1995	"Itni Khushiyaan Jaaneman"	Tera Dukh Mera Dukh	Vinod Rathod	Rajan-Arvind	Rajan	Hindi
1995	"Tera Dukh Mera Dukh (female)"	Tera Dukh Mera Dukh	Solo	Rajan-Arvind	Rajan	Hindi
1994	"Main Teri Yashoda Maiya", "Tu Neh Ka Nata Tod Chala"	Beta Ho To Aisa	Solo	Ravindra Jain	Ravindra Jain	Hindi
1994	"Jitani Door Nayan Se Sapna"	Kokh	Solo	Ravindra Jain	Ravindra Jain	Hindi
1993	"Sun Re Sajjan", "Hai Main Hairat Mein Pad Gayi"	Kaal Bhairav	K. J. Yesudas	Ravindra Jain	Ravindra Jain	Hindi
1993	"Main Hun Misri Ki Rani"	Jaan Pe Khelkar	Suresh Wadkar, Mohammad Aziz	Ravindra Jain	Ravindra Jain	Hindi
1993	"Mera Wada Hua"	Jaan Pe Khelkar	Suresh Wadkar	Ravindra Jain	Ravindra Jain	Hindi
1993	"Chod Desh Chali"	Gouri	Solo	Jugal Kishore-Tilak Raj	Kusum Joshi	Rajasthani
1993	"Savan Aayo Re"	Gouri	Jayshri Shivram	Jugal Kishore – Tilak Raj	Kusum Joshi	Rajasthani
1992	"Aey Sanam Ye Bataa"	Rajoo Dada	Suresh Wadkar	Usha Khanna	Sajan Dehlvi	Hindi
1992	"Aaj Hum Aapke Makaan Main Hain"	Rajoo Dada	Manhar Udhas	Usha Khanna	Asad Bhopali	Hindi
1992	"Meri Khushi Ko Loota Nazar Se Ghira Diya"	Rajoo Dada	Solo	Usha Khanna	Sajan Dehlvi	Hindi
1991	"Haath Ki Safai Ka"	Princess From Kathmandu	Suresh Wadkar	Ravindra Jain	Ravindra Jain	Hindi
1991	"Sakhi Re Main To"	Pyar Ka Sawan	Anup Jalota	Ravindra Jain	Ravindra Jain	Hindi
1991	"Neele Neele Neel Gagan"	Prem Daan	Vivek Sharma	Ravindra Jain	Ravindra Jain	Hindi
1991	"Maine Bhi Peeli Hai Tum Ne Bhi"	Khooni Raat	Solo	Usha Khanna	–	Hindi

=== 1980s ===
Year	Song name	Film name	Co-singer	Music director	Lyricist	Lang
1990	"Ek Baat Karni Hai"	Lohe Ke Haath	Vinod Rathod	Usha Khanna	Anjaan	Hindi
1990	"O Beqarar Dil Thahar – 1, – 2"	Shadyantra	Solo	Ravindra Jain	Ravindra Jain	Hindi
1990	"Holi Aai Holi Mastanon Ki Toli"	Shadyantra	Suresh Wadkar & Chorus	Ravindra Jain	Ravindra Jain	Hindi
1990	"Happy Birthday Pyare Chintu"	Shadyantra	Suresh Wadkar, Jaspal Singh	Ravindra Jain	Ravindra Jain	Hindi
1990	"Sab Ka Masheeha"	Vidrohi	Mohammad Aziz	Ravindra Jain	Ravindra Jain	Hindi
1990	"Kab Aankh Ladai Kab Kudi Patai"	Karnama	Shabbir Kumar, Sushil Kumar & Dilraj Kaur	Ravindra Jain	Ravindra Jain	Hindi
1990	"Umariya Kaise Chhupayegi"	Karnama	Shabbir Kumar, Sushil Kumar, Abhijeet & Dilraj Kaur	Ravindra Jain	Ravindra Jain	Hindi
1990	"Kaisi Manzil Hai Yeh Kaisi Bebasi Ka Saamana"	Vanchit	Solo	Ravindra Jain	Ravindra Jain	Hindi
1990	"Hum Tumhein Tum Humein Mil Gaye", " Izaazat Ho To Hale Dil Sunaye "	Vanchit	Suresh Wadkar	Ravindra Jain	Ravindra Jain	Hindi
1990	"Teri Ankhon Ne Jane Kya Jadoo Kiya Main Khich Ke Chala Aaya"	Hatyare	Suresh Wadkar	Ravindra Jain	Ravindra Jain	Hindi
1990	"Aashiq Hai Tu Mera"	Hatyare	Solo	Ravindra Jain	Ravindra Jain	Hindi
1989	"Dikhlayenge Ab Khel Madari Dikhlayenge"	Nishanebaaz	Kavita Krishnamurthy	Ravindra Jain	Ravindra Jain	Hindi
1989	"Dilbar Janam"	Jailkhana	Kavita Krishnamurthy	Ravindra Jain	Ravindra Jain	Hindi
1989	"Kahe Ghungroo Ki"	Jailkhana	Solo	Ravindra Jain	Ravindra Jain	Hindi
1989	"Tune Wo Haseena"	Aurat Aur Patthar	Dilraj Kaur	Usha Khanna	Indeevar	Hindi
1989	"Main Ho Gayee Deewani"	Kasam Suhaag Ki	Solo	Laxmikant–Pyarelal	Anand Bakshi	Hindi
1989	"Wahan Tu Hai, Yahan Main Hoon"	Sachai Ki Taqat	Amit Kumar & Johny Whisky	Laxmikant–Pyarelal	Anand Bakshi	Hindi
1989	"Ek Raja Ek Rani", "Kahan Raja Kahan Raj Kunwari"	Jung Baaz	Mahendra Kapoor & Nitin Mukesh	Ravindra Jain	Ravindra Jain	Hindi
1989	"Aali Aali Yeh Machchhiwaali Aali", "Mast Aankhon Se Pee Le Mast Aankhon Se Pee Le", "Pyas Bujha Le Tu Dile Beqarar Ki"	Jawani Ke Gunah	Solo	S. Chakraborty	Khalid	Hindi
1989	"Soch Ke Humse Aankh Milana"	Ghabrahat	Kavita Krishnamurthy	Ravindra Jain	Ravindra Jain	Hindi
1989	"Mein Teri Thi Tu Mera Tha"	Mahara Pihar Sansara	Solo	Ravindra Jain	Ravindra Jain	Hariyanavi
1989	"Mere Peechae Peechae", "Pandit Ji Dekho Haath"	Mahara Pihar Sansara	Suresh Wadkar	Ravindra Jain	Ravindra Jain	Hariyanavi
1988	"Hori Aayee Hori"	Mati Balidan Ki	Chandrani Mukherjee, Jaspal Singh & Sushil Kumar	Ravindra Jain	Ravindra Jain	Hindi
1988	"Nav Yauvana", "Hari Hari Bolo"	Chintamani Surdas	Anup Jalota	Ravindra Jain	Ravindra Jain	Hindi
1988	"Saiyya Bedardi Reejhe Kisi Hoor Pe"	Chintamani Surdas	Dilraj Kaur	Ravindra Jain	Ravindra Jain	Hindi
1988	"Saturday Ki Raat Ko"	Mr. X	Solo	Ravindra Jain	Ravindra Jain	Hindi
1988	"Parda Gazhab Dhaye Parda"	Mr. X	Mahendra Kapoor & Sushil Kumar	Ravindra Jain	Ravindra Jain	Hindi
1988	"Hey Narayana – 1", "Ujiara Bhor Ka"	Kariye Kshama	Solo	Ravindra Jain	Ravindra Jain	Hindi
1988	"Na Koi Akbaar"	Kariye Kshama	K. J. Yesudas	Ravindra Jain	Ravindra Jain	Hindi
1988	"Maar Gai Re"	Kariye Kshama	Jaspal Singh	Ravindra Jain	Ravindra Jain	Hindi
1988	"Rani Kahen Ki Gudiya"	Paap Ko Jalaa Kar Raakh Kar Doonga	Mohammad Aziz	Ravindra Jain	Ravindra Jain	Hindi
1987	"Shor Hai Gali Gali Mein Jawan Ho Gayi"	Dozakh	Solo	Ganesh Sharma	Mohinder Dehlvi	Hindi
1987	"Kisi Chor Ne Churali"	Dharti Ki Kasam	Solo	Usha Khanna	Indeevar	Hindi
1987	"Ek Saal Biraha Ganwa Ke Sajanwa"	Aage Moad Hai	Solo	Raghunath Seth	–	Hindi
1987	"Bhaiya Mere Pyare Pyare Bhaiya"	Kachchi Kali	Shabbir Kumar	Usha Khanna	Yogesh Gaud	Hindi
1987	"Shola Hai Dil Mein"	Tera Karam Mera Dharam	Omi	Sonik Omi	Omkar Sharma	Hindi
1987	"Ganpati Bappa Moryya"	Marte Dam Tak	Suresh Wadkar, Mahendra Kapoor & Shabbir Kumar	Ravindra Jain	Ravindra Jain	Hindi
1986	"Tere Prem Mein", "Oonchi Atari Palang Bichhaya"	Babul	Anupama Deshpande	Ravindra Jain	Ravindra Jain	Hindi
1986	"Main Hoon Teri Son Chiraiya", "Teri Khushi Hai Meri Khushi"	Babul	K. J. Yesudas	Ravindra Jain	Ravindra Jain	Hindi
1986	"Are Loot Gayee"	Veer Bhimsen	Solo	Gaurang Vyas	Kavi Pradeep	Hindi
1986	"Jai Jai Mata Rani", "Maa Tu Meri Baat"	Durgaa Maa	Solo	Ravindra Jain	Ravindra Jain	Hindi
1986	"Kal Na Thi Itni Haseen"	Durgaa Maa	Jaspal Singh	Ravindra Jain	Ravindra Jain	Hindi
1986	"Kale Kale Kajal Ki Tarah"	Pati Paisa Aur Pyar	Bhupinder Singh	Vijay Batalvi	-	Hindi
1986	"Nasheela Mausam Bole"	Ehsaan Aap Ka	Dilraj Kaur	Ravindra Jain	Yogesh Gaud	Hindi
1986	"Mujhko Raahon Pe Tum Chhodkar"	Besahaara	Solo	Usha Khanna	Gauhar Kanpuri	Hindi
1986	"Shaam-E-Gham ki Kasam"	Zinda laash	Solo	Ravindra Jain	Ravindra Jain	Hindi
1986	"Tere Mere Pyaar Ki Kundali"	Nasihat	Kishore Kumar	Kalyanji-Anandji	Anjaan	Hindi
1986	"Pandra Baris Ke Hamri Umariya"	Tulsi Sohe Hamar Aangna	Dilraj Kaur	Chitragupta	_	Bhojpuri
1986	"Oie Oie Nee"	Sajjan Thug	Minoo Purshottam	Ravi	_	Punjabi
1986	"Kismat Apni Khul Gayi"	Love 86	Anuradha Paudwal	Laxmikant–Pyarelal	Sameer	Hindi
1986	"Meri Oonchi Nahi Deewar"	Ghar Sansar	Alka Yagnik	Rajesh Roshan	Indeevar	Hindi
1986	"Ram Ji Ki Jai Bolo"	Nishchay	Anup Jalota	Ravindra Jain	Ravindra Jain	Hindi
1986	"Aa To Gaye Hain Tere Sangh"	Nishchay	Sushil Kumar	Ravindra Jain	Ravindra Jain	Hindi
1985	"Kaise Kaise Gyani Ye Sachh Keh Gaye"	Insan Aur Insaan	Manna Dey	Pandit Hemraj	Tajdar Taaj	Hindi
1985	"Yaad Ahti Rahi Shakla Bholi Teri"	Lallu Ram	Suresh Wadkar	Ravindra Jain	Ravindra Jain	Hindi
1985	"Mere Shareek-E-Safar Ab Tera Khuda Hafiz"	Wali-E-Azam	Talat Mahmood	Chitragupta	Ahmed Wasi	Hindi
1985	"Aarti Kare Jo Durga Ki", "Maiyaji Aa Gayi Aangana", "Bhaiya Duj Suhawani", "Yunhi Aankhen BandKarke"	Navratri	Solo	Ravindra Jain	Ravindra Jain	Hindi
1985	"Tu Nata Hai Jeevan Ka"	Navratri	Suresh Wadkar	Ravindra Jain	Ravindra Jain	Hindi
1985	"Hamein Pahechanja"	Navratri	Kanchan & Sushil Kumar	Ravindra Jain	Ravindra Jain	Hindi
1985	"Jo Main Kahoon Ghungroo Se"	Sej Piya Ki	Ravindra Jain	Ravindra Jain	Ravindra Jain	Hindi
1985	"Jiya Se Na Nikli Kasak Jiya Ki", "Main Dafli Bajaon"	Sej Piya Ki	Sushil Kumar	Ravindra Jain	Ravindra Jain	Hindi
1985	"Rudra Kali Bhadra Kali Jai Kali"	Mujhe Kasam Hai	Solo	Ravindra Jain	Ravindra Jain	Hindi
1985	"Kal Tak Main Janti Thi Koi Ajnabi Ho Tum"	Mujhe Kasam Hai	Suresh Wadkar	Ravindra Jain	Ravindra Jain	Hindi
1985	"Jane Kya Hone Laga Hai Mujhko", "Har Ladki Dil Mein Pyar Chhupa Hota Hai", "Dil Aur Jigar Dono Mein Ghar Kar Gai Beimaan"	Tum Par Hum Qurban	Shabbir Kumar	Ravindra Jain	Ravindra Jain	Hindi
1985	"Jane Kya Hai Tujh Mein Aaisa", "Janam Janam Ka Tum Sang Nata Hai Hamar"	Tulsi	Jaspal Singh	Ravindra Jain	Ravindra Jain	Hindi
1985	"Chitchor Teri Bansuriya", "More Jijaji Jag Mein Sab Se Nirale"	Tulsi	Solo	Ravindra Jain	Ravindra Jain	Hindi
1985	"Ban Ja Ban Ja Re Hamaro Saajhedar"	Piya Milan	Ratnesh Singh	Ravindra Jain	Ravindra Jain	Hindi
1985	"Ban Ja Ban Ja Re Hamaro Saajhedar", "Gaon Mein Apni Preet Ke Bairi Hai Sab Log", "Hoga Re Piya Milan Hamara"	Piya Milan	Jaspal Singh	Ravindra Jain	Ravindra Jain	Hindi
1985	"Gora Mukhada Gulabi Chunariya"	Piya Milan	Dilraj Kaur & Ratnesh Singh	Ravindra Jain	Ravindra Jain	Hindi
1985	"Anchra Ki Laaj Ganga Maiya Tohre Hath Ba", "Jari Jaat Jangra Tohaar More Birna"	Anchra Ki Laaj	Solo	_	_	Bhojpuri
1984	"Ek Tha Raja Ek Thi Rani"	Amma	Sushma Shreshtha, Anand Kumar C & Viraj Upadhyay	Raj Kamal	Indeevar	Hindi
1984	"Tere Hi Khwabon Mein"	Dhokebaaz	K. J. Yesudas	Ravindra Jain	Ravindra Jain	Hindi
1984	"Yadukul Raghav", "Yeh Jeevan Beete Lete Huve Tera Naam"	Sasural	Solo	Ravindra Jain	Ravindra Jain	Hindi
1984	"Na Jane Kab Kaise"	Sasural	Kishore Kumar	Ravindra Jain	Ravindra Jain	Hindi
1984	"Chahe Koi Hath Jode"	Sasural	Aarti Mukherjee	Ravindra Jain	Ravindra Jain	Hindi
1984	"Chandra Bhaal Shobhitam", "Ghani Ghani Amraiyo −1, −2", "Ghir Aaye Megh Parbat Se"	Abodh	Solo	Ravindra Jain	Ravindra Jain	Hindi
1984	"Mandir Ki Murati Si"	Abodh	Suresh Wadkar	Ravindra Jain	Ravindra Jain	Hindi
1984	"Ghunghru Baje"	Rakta Bandhan	Solo	Usha Khanna	Indeevar	Hindi
1984	"Paan Beeda Chabaoon"	Papi Sansar	Solo	Madan Chander	Mehboob Sarwar	Hindi
1984	"Ham Jis Pe Marte The"	Purana Mandir	Solo	Ajit Singh	Indeevar	Hindi
1984	"Dhaka Chiki Dhaka Maza Aane Laga"	Zakhmi Sher	Alka Yagnik	Laxmikant–Pyarelal	Santosh Anand	Hindi
1984	"Tum Jo Hamare Liye Gaate Rahe"	Grahasthi	Manna Dey, K. J. Yesudas, Mahendra Kapoor & Lata Ghosh	Ravindra Jain	Ravindra Jain	Hindi
1983	"Tuni Tuni Kathaa Lage Bhari Mitha"	Jheeati Sita Pari	Pranab Patnaik	Shantanu Mohapatra	Shibabrata Das	Oriya
1983	"Chagala Pabana Chagala Chagali"	Abhilasha	Solo	Saroj Patnaik	–	Oriya
1983	"Yeh Bismillah Ki Barkat Hai"	Bismillah Ki Barkat	Solo	Iqbal Qureshi	Anwar Farrukhabadi	Hindi
1983	"Ghungaru Bandhe Jab See Maine"	Kaise Kaise Log	Solo	Padamshree	Sajan Dehlvi	Hindi
1983	"Man Vinha Ke Swar Jab Gunjhe"	Kaise Kaise Log	Solo	Padamshree	Sajan Dehlvi	Hindi
1983	"Ab Kahe Laagal Manva Hamaar", "Rupaya Paisa Sab Kuch Bhail"	Senur	Solo	Ravindra Jain	–	Bhojpuri
1982	"Tujhako Furasat Se Vidhaata Ne Racha"	Aarohi	Mukesh	Anand Sagar Kiran	Bharat Vyas	Hindi
1982	"Gol Gol Hai Duniya"	Rustom	Alka Yagnik	Kalyanji-Anandji	Indeevar	Hindi
1982	"Tere Pyar Ke Raj Mahal Se"	Raj Mahal	Asha Bhosle	Kalyanji-Anandji	Verma Malik	Hindi
1982	"Aake Jaiyyo Na, Aake Jaiyyo Na Pyare Atariyaa Se, Paani Le Jaao Gori Gagariyaa Se"	Pyara Dost	Solo	Usha Khanna	Nida Fazli	Hindi
1982	"Kaun Rok Sakta Hai Humein Ab Pyar Karne Se"	Panchwin Manzil	Nitin Mukesh	Usha Khanna	-	Hindi
1982	"Do Hi Din Hai Baras Mein", "Shivji Ke Chelon Bhang Thodi Si Lelo"	Bhagya	Kishore Kumar	Ravindra Jain	Ravindra Jain	Hindi
1982	"Main Hoon Prem Diwani Tere Sapno Ki Rani"	Bhagya	Solo	Ravindra Jain	Ravindra Jain	Hindi
1982	"Mujhe De Do Raseele Hont"	Meharbaani	Mohammad Rafi	Ravindra Jain	Ravindra Jain	Hindi
1982	"Jani O Jani"	Meharbaani	Solo	Ravindra Jain	Ravindra Jain	Hindi
1982	"Kya Kahna Kya Kahna"	Meharbaani	Mahendra Kapoor	Ravindra Jain	Ravindra Jain	Hindi
1982	"Om Namah Shivay Om Namah Shivay", "Gunje Gunje Re Gokul Dhaam"	Akhand Sowbhagyavati	Raj Kamal	Raj Kamal	Pandit Narendra Sharma	Hindi
1982	"Shankar Ke Sheesh Par Ganga"	Akhand Sowbhagyavati	Solo	Raj Kamal	Pandit Narendra Sharma	Hindi
1982	"Goro Rang Bhayo Jeeko", "Ram Dhaniya O Raja Ram Dhaniya"	Brij Bhoomi	Solo	Ravindra Jain	Ravindra Jain	Braj Bhasha dialect (Hindi)
1982	"Sabne Desh Ka Naam Liya"	Rajput	Mahendra Kapoor & Manhar Udhas	Laxmikant–Pyarelal	Anand Bakshi	Hindi
1982	"Hum Bhi Yahan"	Taaqat	Kishore Kumar & Anuradha Paudwal	Laxmikant–Pyarelal	Anand Bakshi	Hindi
1982	"Saat Saheliyan Khadi Khadi"	Vidhaata	Padmini Kolhapure, Kanchan, Kishore Kumar, Alka Yagnik, Anuradha Paudwal, Sadhana Sargam, Shivangi Kolhapure	Kalyanji-Anandji	Anand Bakshi	Hindi
1982	"Hey Ganga Maiya Ganga Maiya Bhar De Acharwa Hamar", "Solah Baras Mein", "Tohri Pooja Mein"	Ganga Maiya Bhar De Acharwa Hamar	Solo	Ravindra Jain	S. Bhaskar	Bhojpuri
1982	"Gori Tori Rupowa"	Ganga Maiya Bhar De Acharwa Hamar	Suresh Wadkar	Ravindra Jain	S. Bhaskar	Bhojpuri
1982	"Babua O Babua", "Jab Tak Pure Na Ho Phere Saat"	Nadiya Ke Paar	Solo	Ravindra Jain	Ravindra Jain	Hindi
1982	"Kaun Disha Mein Leke Chala"	Nadiya Ke Paar	Jaspal Singh	Ravindra Jain	Ravindra Jain	Hindi
1982	"Gunja Re Chandan"	Nadiya Ke Paar	Suresh Wadkar	Ravindra Jain	Ravindra Jain	Hindi
1982	"Jogi Ji Dheere Dheere"	Nadiya Ke Paar	Chandrani Mukherjee, Jaspal Singh & Sushil Kumar	Ravindra Jain	Ravindra Jain	Hindi
1981	"Kaise Nibhegi Apni Preet Re Gopala", "Adharon Mein Kuch Rahe Gayi"	Parakh (Unreleased)	Solo	Ravindra Jain	Ravindra Jain	Hindi
1981	"Hone Laga Hai Mujhe Aap Ka Nasha", " Main Bhi Yehi Sochoon"	Parakh (Unreleased)	Kishore Kumar	Ravindra Jain	Ravindra Jain	Hindi
1981	"Karishma Ye Kya Ho Gaya"	Kahani Ek Chor Ki	Kishore Kumar	Ravindra Jain	Ravindra Jain	Hindi
1981	"Kahani Ek Chor Ki"	Kahani Ek Chor Ki	Mahendra Kapoor	Ravindra Jain	Ravindra Jain	Hindi
1981	"Raat Humne Sapna Dekha Hai Sanam"	Ladaaku	Shailendra Singh	Usha Khanna	–	Hindi
1981	"Main Woh Chanda Nahi"	Katilon Ke Kaatil	Anwar	Kalyanji-Anandji	Indeevar	Hindi
1981	"Nakharalo Devario"	Supattar Beenanie	Solo	Mahendra Pujari	Mahendra Pujari	Rajasthani
1981	"Sawania Mai Aao", "Chandramukhi Mriglochani"	Supattar Beenanie	Nitin Mukesh	Mahendra Pujari	Mahendra Pujari	Rajasthani
1981	"Hey Nat Nagar Daya Ke Sagar"	Itni Si Baat	Alka Yagnik	Kalyanji-Anandji	Anjaan	Hindi
1981	"Hain Kahan Jo Mit Jaaye"	Main Aur Mera Hathi	Kishore Kumar	Kalyanji-Anandji	Maya Govind	Hindi
1981	"Dilrooba Dilrooba Paas Aa Paas Aa"	Raaz	Solo	Ravindra Jain	Ravindra Jain	Hindi
1981	"Chhodke Sharafat Bandh Liye Ghungroo"	Haqdaar	Solo	Kalyanji-Anandji	Rajendra Krishan	Hindi
1981	"Jiyo Jiyo"	Haqdaar	Anuradha Paudwal	Kalyanji-Anandji	Rajendra Krishan	Hindi
1981	"Garibon Ki Holi"	Ek Aur Ek Gyarah	Kishore Kumar & Asha Bhosle	Laxmikant–Pyarelal	Majrooh Sultanpuri	Hindi
1981	"Tere Rang Men Ang Ang Rang Lai Hoon"	Khel Muqaddar Ka	Solo	Sardul Kwatra	Munsif	Hindi
1981	"Marjabak To Kuthe"	Sannata	Mehmood	Rajesh Roshan	Majrooh Sultanpuri	Hindi
1981	"Ek Nahin Hum Do Nahin"	Tajurba	Suresh Wadkar, Amit Kumar, Shabbir Kumar & Usha Khanna	Usha Khanna	Asad Bhopali	Hindi
1981	"Bedana Bhara Jiabane Mora Karunare Dia"	Batasi Jhada	Solo	Salil Chowdhury	–	Oriya
1981	"E Lakhi Jae Dekhi Sei Nila Kaeen Aakhi"	Batasi Jhada	K. J. Yesudas & Sikandar Alam	Salil Chowdhury	Atul Mahakuda	Oriya

=== 1970s ===
Year	Song name	Film name	Co-singer	Music director	Lyricist	Lang
1980	"Mohabbat Ek Wada Hai"	Kali Ghata	Asha Bhosle	Laxmikant–Pyarelal	Anand Bakshi	Hindi
1980	"Bhaag Phoote"	Hum Nahi Sudhrenge	Dilraj Kaur & Bhushan Mehta	Ravindra Jain	Ravindra Jain	Hindi
1980	"Katha Suno Siya Swaymvar Ki", "Tere Tan Mein Pale"	Yeh Kaisa Insaf ?	Solo	Ravindra Jain	Ravindra Jain	Hindi
1980	"Yeh Kaisa Insaf"	Yeh Kaisa Insaf ?	Bhushan Mehta	Ravindra Jain	Ravindra Jain	Hindi
1980	"Kya Likhoon Kaise Likhoon −1, −2" Saat Samundar Terah Nadi Paar −1, −2"	Maan Abhimam	Solo	Ravindra Jain	Ravindra Jain	Hindi
1980	"Tere Dwar Khule To Mere Bhagya Khule"	Badrinath Dham	Mahendra Kapoor	Ravindra Jain	Ravindra Jain	Hindi
1980	"Ankhen Kholo Jago Jago"	Badrinath Dham	Mohammad Rafi	Ravindra Jain	Ravindra Jain	Hindi
1980	"Main To Bechoon Chakku Chhuri"	Badrinath Dham	Solo	Ravindra Jain	Ravindra Jain	Hindi
1980	"Na Na Na Yeh Kya Karne Lage Ho"	Bombay 405 Miles	Solo	Kalyanji-Anandji	Indeevar	Hindi
1980	"Khwab Ko Badal Denge"	Khwab	K. J. Yesudas	Ravindra Jain	Ravindra Jain	Hindi
1980	"Ek Aas Liye Vishwash Liye"	Khwab	Suresh Wadkar & Jaspal Singh	Ravindra Jain	Ravindra Jain	Hindi
1980	"Na Jane Aise Ho Gaya Kaise"	Sajan Mere Main Sajan Ki	K. J. Yesudas	Ravindra Jain	Ravindra Jain	Hindi
1980	"Sajan Mere Main Sajan Ki"	Sajan Mere Main Sajan Ki	Solo	Ravindra Jain	Ravindra Jain	Hindi
1980	"Ek Chidiya Bina Par Ki Shehjaadi Kisi Ghar Ki Bolo Woh Kaun Hai"	Sajan Mere Main Sajan Ki	Minoo Purushotham & Chetan	Ravindra Jain	Ravindra Jain	Hindi
1980	"Megh Tuhi Nahin Jal Barsaye", "Patakha Main Hoon Patakha", "Peechhe Peechhe Aa Jaona"	Zakhmon Ke Nishan	Solo	Ravindra Jain	Ravindra Jain	Hindi
1980	"Aa Gaye Re Hum Yun Masti Mein"	Zakhmon Ke Nishan	Chandrani Mukherjee, Dilraj Kaur, Jaspal Singh, Suresh Wadkar & Chorus	Ravindra Jain	Ravindra Jain	Hindi
1980	"Bhari Barsat Mein Dil Jalaya", "Ab Wafa Ka Naam Na Le Koi"	Oh Bewafa	Solo	Vedpal Verma	Sawan Kumar	Hindi
1980	"Mera Dil Kisne Liya"	Oh Bewafa	Suresh Wadkar	Vedpal Verma	Sawan Kumar	Hindi
1980	"Hain Jo Yehi Pyar Ka Trailor"	Insaaf Ka Tarazu	Mahendra Kapoor & Asha Bhosle	Ravindra Jain	Ravindra Jain	Hindi
1980	"Sau Sau Saal Jiyo Hamari Sasuji"	Sau Din Saas Ke	Asha Bhosle	Kalyanji-Anandji	Indeevar	Hindi
1980	"Moti Palley Pai Gayi"	Sau Din Saas Ke	Mahendra Kapoor	Kalyanji-Anandji	Indeevar	Hindi
1980	"Tu Is Tarah Se Meri Zindagi Mein Saamil Hai"	Aap To Aise Na The	Solo	Usha Khanna	Nida Fazli	Hindi
1980	"Hum Tere Bina Bhi Nahin Ji Sakte"	Jwalamukhi	Kishore Kumar, Asha Bhosle & Mahendra Kapoor	Kalyanji-Anandji	Anjaan	Hindi
1980	"Mere Saiyanji Bade Harjaee"	Kaala Pani	Anuradha Paudwal	Laxmikant–Pyarelal	Anand Bakshi	Hindi
1979	"Megha O Re Megha Tu To Jaaye Des Vides", "Kaisi Hoon Main"	Sunayana	Solo	Ravindra Jain	Ravindra Jain	Hindi
1979	"Kharido Koi Kharido, Kharido Mujhe Kharido"	Raja Harishchandra	Mohammad Rafi	Ravindra Jain	Ravindra Jain	Hindi
1979	"Naacho Re Gaao Re Naacho"	Raja Harishchandra	Mahendra Kapoor	Ravindra Jain	Ravindra Jain	Hindi
1979	"Aare O Banke, Kahan Jaat Hawa Banthan Ke", "Mujhe Bhakti Bhajan Kuch Yaad Nahin", "Sach Bolne Walon Ka Yadi Haal Yeh Hoga"	Raja Harishchandra	Solo	Ravindra Jain	Ravindra Jain	Hindi
1979	"Beparwa Bedardi Pagla Deewana", "Mera Joban Bandha Rupaiya"	Naiyya	Solo	Ravindra Jain	Ravindra Jain	Hindi
1979	"Mein Rambha Roop Ki Rani"	Har Har Gange	Asha Bhosle	Ravindra Jain	Ravindra Jain	Hindi
1979	"Navdurga Navroop Maiya, Sundar Madhur Swaroop Maiya"	Har Har Gange	Solo	Ravindra Jain	Ravindra Jain	Hindi
1979	"Gaddi Jaandi Yeh Chalanga Mar Di"	Dada	Mohammad Rafi, Shailendra Singh & Dilraj Kaur	Usha Khanna	Ravindra Jain	Hindi
1979	"Behna O Meri Ladli"; "Aaj Na Jane Kya Se Kya Ho Jata"	Aatish	Mohammad Rafi	Ravindra Jain	Ravindra Jain	Hindi
1979	"Tere Chahne Wale Aaye Hain"	Aatish	Mohammad Rafi, Asha Bhosle & Bhushan Mehta	Ravindra Jain	Ravindra Jain	Hindi
1979	"Govinda Gopala", "Koi Mat Jariyo Ri Mere Bhag Pe"	Gopal Krishna	Solo	Ravindra Jain	Ravindra Jain	Hindi
1979	"Neer Bharan Ka Karke Bahana"	Gopal Krishna	K. J. Yesudas	Ravindra Jain	Ravindra Jain	Hindi
1979	"Aayo Phagun Hathilo"	Gopal Krishna	Jaspal Singh	Ravindra Jain	Ravindra Jain	Hindi
1979	"Aashritha Valsalane"	Sujatha	Solo	Ravindra Jain	Mankombu	Malayalam
1979	"Kaun Hai Aisa Jise Phoolon Se"	Raadha Aur Seeta	K. J. Yesudas	Ravindra Jain	Ravindra Jain	Hindi
1979	"Man Ki Baat Jab Hothon Pe", "Man Meet Aur Preet Milte Hai – 2"	Raadha Aur Seeta	Solo	Ravindra Jain	Ravindra Jain	Hindi
1979	"Bheega Bheega Mausam Aaya", "Phir Wohi Sawan"	Bhayanak	Solo	Usha Khanna	Indeevar	Hindi
1979	"O Saiyya Mein, Saiyya Mein Aayi Ghar"	Bhayanak	Suresh Wadkar	Usha Khanna	Indeevar	Hindi
1979	"Aayi Hain, Aayi Hain Phir Se Baharein"	Ghar Ki Laaj	Solo	Ravindra Jain	Ravindra Jain	Hindi
1979	"Yeh Rang Bhare Din Umang-Bhare Din"	Man Ka Aangan	Solo	Ravindra Jain	Ravindra Jain	Hindi
1979	"Jai Bhawani Jai Ho Bhawani"	Ladke Baap Se Badke	Solo	Ravindra Jain	Ravindra Jain	Hindi
1978	"Radha Thumak Thumak Mat Chalna"	Toofani Takker	Solo	C. Ramchandra	Ram Rasila	Hindi
1978	"O Ji O Bhartar Ji"	Rangilo Rajshthan	O Vyas	Babu Singh	Bharat Vyas	Rajasthani
1978	"Yeh To Kal Ki Hai Baat"	Sone Ka Dil Lohe Ke Haath	Solo	Usha Khanna	Asad Bhopali	Hindi
1978	"Ankhiyon Ke Jharokhon Se −1, −2, −3"	Ankhiyon Ke Jharokhon Se	Solo	Ravindra Jain	Ravindra Jain	Hindi
1978	"Ek Din Tum Bahut Bade Banoge", "Kai Din Se Mujhe"	Ankhiyon Ke Jharokhon Se	Shailendra Singh	Ravindra Jain	Ravindra Jain	Hindi
1978	"Dohavali","Dohavali (Non Stop Singing)"	Ankhiyon Ke Jharokhon Se	Jaspal Singh	Ravindra Jain	Ravindra Jain	Hindi
1978	"Nathaniyan Jo Dali"	Main Tulsi Tere Aangan Ki	Anuradha Paudwal	Laxmikant–Pyarelal	Anand Bakshi	Hindi
1978	"Bachpan Mohe Peechhe Bulaye"	Madhumalti	Solo	Ravindra Jain	Ravindra Jain	Hindi
1978	"Duniya Se Door Ek Nai Duniya"	Madhumalti	Suresh Wadkar	Ravindra Jain	Ravindra Jain	Hindi
1978	"Ek Phool Aur Ek Moti Se −1, −2"	Hamara Sansar	Mahendra Kapoor	Ravindra Jain	Ravindra Jain	Hindi
1978	"Paisa Do Paisa Aana Do Aana Dete Jaana Re"	Hamara Sansar	Chandrani Mukherjee	Ravindra Jain	Ravindra Jain	Hindi
1978	"Akhand Aseem Atoot Rahe Pati Parmeshwar Ka Pyar Sakhi"	Ganga Sagar	Chandrani Mukherjee	Ravindra Jain	Ravindra Jain	Hindi
1978	"Jai Ho-2, Ganga Ki Jai Ho Lehronwali Maiya Ki Jai Ho", "O Ganga Maiya-2, Aayi Gagan Se Dharti Pe", "Naag Devta Meri Vinati Suno Re"	Ganga Sagar	Solo	Ravindra Jain	Ravindra Jain	Hindi
1978	"Jag Janani Maha Maya"	Aakhri Kasam	Solo	Ravindra Jain	Ravindra Jain	Hindi
1978	"Humse Chhupa Na Jee Ka"	Aakhri Kasam	Suman Kalyanpur	Ravindra Jain	Ravindra Jain	Hindi
1978	"Wafa Jo Na Ki To Jafa Bhi Na Kije"	Muqaddar Ka Sikandar	Solo	Kalyanji-Anandji	Anjaan	Hindi
1978	"Madhuban Khushboo Deta Hai"	Saajan Bina Suhagan	K. J. Yesudas & Anuradha Paudwal	Usha Khanna	Amit Khanna	Hindi
1977	"He Dayamayi Sankat"	Solah Shukrawar	Solo	Ravindra Jain	Ravindra Jain	Hindi
1977	"Aaj Tak Jo Kaha Tune Kaha"	Shyam Tere Kitne Naam	Solo	Ravindra Jain	Ravindra Jain	Hindi
1977	"Shyam Baba Shyam Baba"	Shyam Tere Kitne Naam	Mahendra Kapoor	Ravindra Jain	Ravindra Jain	Hindi
1977	"Jangal Jangal Doloon Main"	Safed Haathi	Ravindra Jain & Nirmala Misra	Ravindra Jain	Ravindra Jain	Hindi
1977	"Sona Kare Jhilmil Jhilmil", "Manmohak Ye Pyara Pyar Gaon"	Paheli	Suresh Wadkar	Ravindra Jain	Ravindra Jain	Hindi
1977	"Kanha Ki Zid Par Nachegi Radha"	Paheli	Chandrani Mukherjee	Ravindra Jain	Ravindra Jain	Hindi
1977	"Saheli Ho Paheli Poochho"	Paheli	Suresh Wadkar & Chandrani Mukherjee	Ravindra Jain	Ravindra Jain	Hindi
1977	"Tan Bhigey Man Bhigey"	Paheli	Solo	Ravindra Jain	Ravindra Jain	Hindi
1977	"Khushiyan Hi Khushiyan Ho"	Dulhan Wahi Jo Piya Man Bhaaye	K. J. Yesudas & Banasree Sengupta	Ravindra Jain	Ravindra Jain	Hindi
1977	"Le To Aaye Ho Humein", "Mangal Bhawan Amangal Hari", "Jahan Prem Ka Pawan", "Purvaiya Ke Jhonke Aaye", "Mahv-E-Khayal-E-Yaar Hain", "Shyama O Shyama Rama O Rama"	Dulhan Wahi Jo Piya Man Bhaaye	Solo	Ravindra Jain	Ravindra Jain	Hindi
1977	"Aaj Ki Raat Peene De Saaqi"	Do Chehre	Mohammad Rafi, Manna Dey & Minoo Parshottam	Sonik Omi	Bharat Vyas	Hindi
1977	"O Meri Pyari Jalebi"	Daku Aur Mahatma	Amit Kumar	Ravindra Jain	Ravindra Jain	Hindi
1977	"Hansti Aankhon Ko Jisne Ansoo Diye"	Daku Aur Mahatma	Mahendra Kapoor & Jaspal Singh	Ravindra Jain	Ravindra Jain	Hindi
1977	"Suman Saman Tum Apna Khila Khila Man Rakhna"	Kotwal Saab	Solo	Ravindra Jain	Ravindra Jain	Hindi
1976	"Tu Jo Mere Sur Mein", "Jab Deep Jale Aana Jab Shaam Dhale Aana"	Chitchor	K. J. Yesudas	Ravindra Jain	Ravindra Jain	Hindi
1976	"Is Mulaqat Ka Bas Maza Lijiye"	Jaaneman	Mohammad Rafi & Mukesh	Laxmikant–Pyarelal	Anand Bakshi	Hindi
1976	"Sun Ke Teri Pukar", "Akela Chal Chala Chal"	Fakira	Solo	Ravindra Jain	Ravindra Jain	Hindi
1976	"Jam Ke Naacho O Zara Jam Ke Naacho Pyar Karo"	Raeeszada	Jaspal Singh	Ravindra Jain	Ravindra Jain	Hindi
1976	"Jeet Gaye Hum Jeet Gaye Hain"	Raeeszada	Mahendra Kapoor	Ravindra Jain	Ravindra Jain	Hindi
1976	"Hum Unki Aarzoo Mein Kuch Aise Kho Gaye Hain"	Noor-E-Elahi	Anwar	Babloo Dheeraj	Qamar Shaad	Hindi
1976	"Koi Hamein Basale Apne Dilo Jigar Mein"	Noor-E-Elahi	Solo	Babloo Dheeraj	Qaisar- Ul- Jafri	Hindi
1976	"As Vele Sajanji Aanda", "Jatt Veri Paigya Palle", "Ni Chhut Jaye Railgaddiye"	Chadi Jawani Budhe Nu	Solo	Ravindra Jain	S. P. Bakshi	Punjabi
1975	"Mohe Chhota Mila Bhartaar"	Geet Gata Chal	Chetan & Jaspal Singh	Ravindra Jain	Ravindra Jain	Hindi
1975	"Chal Chal Kahin Akele Mein"	Salaakhen	Sulakshana Pandit	Ravindra Jain	Ravindra Jain	Hindi
1975	"Bhabhi Ki Unglee Mein"	Tapasya	Chandrani Mukherjee	Ravindra Jain	M G Hashmat	Hindi
1974	"Teri Meri Dosti Zindabad"	Raakh Aur Chingari	Usha Mangeshkar	Ravindra Jain	Ravindra Jain	Hindi
1973	"Ja Re Ja O Deewane Tu Kya Jaane Anjaane"	Kuchche Dhaage	Lata Mangeshkar	Laxmikant–Pyarelal	Anand Bakshi	Hindi
1973	"Hazaar Dil Mein Ho To Aise Nikle Armaan"	Bhima Mera Haathi	Mukesh	Vedpal Verma	Vedpal Verma	Hindi
1973	"Dulhan Bhai Gori Aa Ha Aa Ha"	Bhima Mera Haathi	Usha Mangeshkar	Vedpal Verma	Vedpal Verma	Hindi
1973	"Raam Raam Raam Hare Seetaram Chal Dheere Dheere"	Bhima Mera Haathi	Manna Dey	Vedpal Verma	Vedpal Verma	Hindi
1973	"Rajkunwar Ne Raja Banke Haathi Pe Ki Sawari"	Bhima Mera Haathi	Sulakshana Pandit	Vedpal Verma	Vedpal Verma	Hindi
1973	"Meri Jawani Mujhko Sataye"	Kora Badan	Solo	Vedpal Verma	Babu Singh Maan	Hindi
1973	"Ganga Tere Pyar Mein Jage Re"	Ganga	Mohammad Rafi	N. Dutta	Aziz Kashmiri	Hindi
1973	"Panchhi Pinjare Mein Roye"	Hum Sab Chor Hain	Suman Kalyanpur	Usha Khanna	Asad Bhopali	Hindi
1973	"Pujan Karo Mata Laxmi Ka"	Seetaram Radheshyam	Nila Joshi	N. Dutta	Madan	Hindi
1972	"Koi Hansta Hai Yahan Aur Koi Rota"	Shri Krishna Bhakti	Solo	Kamal Kant	Pujari	Hindi
1972	"Idhar Bhi Ishwar Udhar Bhi Ishwar"	Hari Darshan	Kamal Barot & Sushma Shreshtha	Kalyanji-Anandji	Pradeep	Hindi
1972	"Bol Gudiya Khol Pudiya Chupke Se Chootega Patakha", "Paavan Mann Ke Maharaja Rang Rasiya Chahat Khilegee Sajan Ji", "Meri Mushkil Na Jane Balam Haye Ram Anjane De Jaaye Woh Bairee"	Bachche Mere Saathi	Mahendra Kapoor	M. S. Vishavanathan	Vedpal Verma	Hindi
1972	"Rahen Ghar Mein To Daddy Aur Mummy Ne Hamein Daanta"	Anokhi Pehchan	Usha Khanna	Kalyanji-Anandji	Anand Bakshi	Hindi
1972	"Tan Bhi Jale Man Bhi Jale"	Parivartan	Manna Dey	Chand Pardesi	Gopaldas Neeraj	Hindi
1972	"Aayi Aayi Aayi Mein Aa Gayi Re Kaise Tere Baaton Mein Aa Gayi Re"	Pasand Apani Apani	Solo	Vishnu Khanna	Amar	Hindi
1972	"Mere Hothon Pe Naam Tumhara Aaya Meri Aankhon Mein Rang Gulabi Chhaya"	Pasand Apani Apani	Solo	Vishnu Khanna	Shiv Kumar Saroj	Hindi
1972	"Yeh Bheegi Fizayen"	Kaanch Aur Heera	Mohammad Rafi	Ravindra Jain	Ravindra Jain	Hindi
1971	"Taare Kitne Neel Gagan Pe"	Aap Aye Bahaar Ayee	Mohammad Rafi	Laxmikant–Pyarelal	Anand Bakshi	Hindi
1971	"Mehboob Ki Mehndi Hathon Mein"	Mehboob Ki Mehndi	Lata Mangeshkar	Laxmikant–Pyarelal	Anand Bakshi	Hindi
1971	"Dekho Dil Ka Chor Aaya"	Gehra Raaz	Solo	Salil Chowdhury	Asad Bhopali	Hindi
1971	"Mil Ja Ab To Mil Ja"	Gehra Raaz	Solo	Salil Chowdhury	Akhtar Romani	Hindi
1971	"Are Ghar Ko Mat Godam Bana"	Chhoti Bahu	Solo	Kalyanji-Anandji	Indeevar	Hindi
1971	"Apna To Faisla Hai Ladki Pasand Hai"	Ladki Pasand Hai	Mohammad Rafi	Sonik Omi	G. L. Rawal	Hindi
1971	"Tu Karde Nazar Se Mastana"	Ladki Pasand Hai	Mukesh	Sonik Omi	G. L. Rawal	Hindi
1971	"Gham-E-Duniya Se Tum Daman Bacha Jaate"	Ladki Pasand Hai	Solo	Sonik Omi	G. L. Rawal	Hindi
1971	"Jai Lotaram"	Narad Leela	Solo	N. Dutta	Madan	Hindi
1971	"Do Dilon Mein Humesha Mohabbat"	Achha Bura	Sulakshana Pandit	Raj Kamal	Asad Bhopali	Hindi
1971	"Yeh Roza Yeh Roze Ki Shaan Allah Allah"	Shan-E-Khuda	Mohammad Rafi	Iqbal Qureshi	Kaifi Azmi	Hindi
1971	"Sanma O Mere Pyar Ka"	Dost Aur Dushman	Mohammad Rafi	Raj Kamal	Asad Bhopali	Hindi
1971	"Main Ankahi Kahaani Sadiyon Ki Hoon Nishani", "Main Jaan Ke Badle Mein Le Loongi Dhadkta Dil Jayega Kahan Katil"	Irada	Solo	Mohammed D Shafi	Qafil Azar	Hindi
1971	"Gori Karle Aaj Singaar Saja Le Sapnon Ka Sansaar"	Darar	Krishna Kalle	Sudhir Phadke	Mahendra Dehlvi	Hindi

=== 1960s ===
Year	Song name	Film name	Co-singer	Music director	Lyricist	Lang
1970	"Aaya Re Khilone Wala"	Bachpan	Mohammad Rafi	Laxmikant–Pyarelal	Anand Bakshi	Hindi
1970	"Nain Mere Barse Tu Aaja Re"	Bhagwan Parshuram	Solo	Jay Kumar	Madan	Hindi
1970	"Jo Moti Naani Hai"	Heer Ranjha	S.Balbir, Usha Timothy & Krishna Kalle	Madan Mohan	Kaifi Azmi	Hindi
1970	"Hanste Huye Naina Nir Bahaye"	Jhoom Utha Akash	Solo	Kanti Kiran	Siraj Agaazi	Hindi
1970	"Nadiya Kinare Nain Humare"	Jhoom Utha Akash	Mukesh	Kanti Kiran	Siraj Agaazi	Hindi
1970	"Sawan Aayo Re Bin Mausam"	Jhoom Utha Akash	Mahendra Kapoor	Kanti Kiran	Siraj Agaazi	Hindi
1970	"Tera Mera Saath Jaise Din Aur Raat Jeevan Bhar Ki Khushiyan Lekar"	Jhoom Utha Akash	Mahendra Kapoor	Kanti Kiran	Aatish Jalali	Hindi
1970	"Saiyaan Anadi Na Jane Pyar Ko Dhoke Se Apna Bana Liya Ganvaar Ko"	Jhoom Utha Akash	Manna Dey	Kanti Kiran	Siraj Agaazi	Hindi
1970	"Zulmi Nazariya"	Jhoom Utha Akash	Krishna Kalle	Kanti Kiran	Aatish Jalali	Hindi
1970	"Ganga Maiya Aaj Hamari Rakh Le Laaj Ganga Maiya", "Hum Hey Tumhare Tum Hamare Hum Jab-Jab Lenge Janam Sansar Mein"	Sampoorn Teerth Yatra	Solo	Shivram	Madan	Hindi
1970	"Chali Kayan Hansti Gaati"	Jawab	Mohammad Rafi & Asha Bhosle	Laxmikant–Pyarelal	Rajendra Krishan	Hindi
1970	"Kis Tarah Bhoolega Dil", "Are Amma Wohi Mua"	Jawab	Asha Bhosle	Laxmikant–Pyarelal	Rajendra Krishan	Hindi
1970	"Aisa Banoonga Actor Main Yaro"	Ghar Ghar Ki Kahani	Solo	Kalyanji-Anandji	Qamar Jalalabadi	Hindi
1970	"Jagi Ja Tara (Sad Version of Soyi Ja Tara)"	Mastana	Kishore Kumar	Laxmikant–Pyarelal	Anand Bakshi	Hindi
1970	"Sakia Tu Bhar Bhar Ke Jaam"	Gunahon Ke Raaste	Manna Dey	Jagadish Khanna	Naqsh Lyalpuri	Hindi
1970	"Raj Kapoor Ki Neeli Aankhein"	Maa Aur Mamta	Mohammad Rafi & Balbir Kaur	Laxmikant–Pyarelal	Anand Bakshi	Hindi
1970	"Bairi Mujhko Dikhaike Tu Batwa"	Truck Driver	Usha Timothy	Sonik Omi	Naqsh Lyallpuri	Hindi
1969	"Anjaan Anaadi Pardesi Hai", "Main Na Maangoo Re Maiya Tose Dhan-Dham Re"	Pujarin	Solo	N. Dutta	Madan	Hindi
1969	"Pagh Mein Ghunghroo Chhanke"	Jyoti	Solo	S. D. Burman	Anand Bakshi	Hindi
1969	"Dil Mein Dhadkan Lab Par Hai"	Samay Bada Balwan	Usha Khanna	Usha Khanna	Dina Nath Madhok	Hindi
1969	"Dil Karne Laga Hain Pyar Tumhein"	Nateeja	Mohammad Rafi	Usha Khanna	Asad Bhopali	Hindi
1969	"Is Ada Se Salaam Lete Hain Jaise Kuchh Intakaam Lete Hain"	Nateeja	Solo	Usha Khanna	Salim Sagar	Hindi
1969	"Tum Mile Gum Gaya Dard-E-Dil Tham Gaya"	Nateeja	Mahendra Kapoor	Usha Khanna	–	Hindi
1969	"Piya Ji Mhaaso Tha Bin"	Gogaji Peer	Solo	P. Shivram	–	Hindi
1969	"Mein To Jaipur Ki Haa ji"	Gogaji Peer	Pushpa	P. Shivram	–	Hindi
1969	"Aa Do Do Pankh Laga Ke Panchhi Banenge"	Rahgir	Aarti Mukherjee	Hemant Kumar	Gulzar	Hindi
1969	"Le Chal Mere Jeevan Saathi"	Vishwas	Mukesh	Kalyanji-Anandji	Gulshan Bawra	Hindi
1969	"Dhol Baja Dhol Dhol Jania"	Vishwas	Mukesh, Mahendra Kapoor & Usha Timothy	Kalyanji-Anandji	Gulshan Bawra	Hindi
1969	"Chanda Ko Dhoodhne Sabhi Taare Nikal Pade"	Jeene Ki Raah	Asha Bhosle & Usha Mangeshkar	Laxmikant–Pyarelal	Anand Bakshi	Hindi
1968	"Chali Pati Sang Sati Chali, Apne Suhaag Ko Amar Banane Amarnaath Ki Aur Chali"	Mata Mahakali	Manna Dey	Avinash Vyas	Bharat Vyas	Hindi
1968	"Hum Nahin Chahate Yeh Jeevan", "Hey, Rang Rangeelo Phagun Aayo, Gulab Ki Jholi Bhar Bhar Laayo"	Mata Mahakali	Manna Dey	Avinash Vyas	Bharat Vyas	Hindi
1968	"Hey Amarnaath Ke Shiv Sun Lo Meri Pukaar Har Shambhoo Parvati-Pati, Hey Chandra Shekhar", "Ruk Jaa Ruk Jaa, Hey maata Maha Kaali"	Mata Mahakali	Solo	Avinash Vyas	Bharat Vyas	Hindi
1968	"Saaf Karo Insaf Karo"	Aashirwad	Asha Bhosle, Ashok Kumar & Harindranath Chattopadhyaya	Vasant Desai	Gulzar	Hindi
1968	"Hata De Ghoonghat Dikha De Mukhda Chand Se Bhi Ujala"	Fareb	Usha Timothy & Manhar Udhas	Usha Khanna	Javed Anwar	Hindi
1968	"Ban Jao Tum Mehman Mere Dil Ke"	Fareb	Krishna Kalle	Usha Khanna	Asad Bhopali	Hindi
1968	"Tu Khamosh Main Purjosh"	Roop Rupaiya	Solo	Usha Khanna	P. L. Santoshi	Hindi
1968	"Dus Paise Mein Raam Le Lo"	Ek Phool Bhool	Solo	Usha Khanna	Indeevar	Hindi
