= Ganga Sagar =

Ganga Sagar may refer to:

- Sagar Island, an island in the Ganges Delta
  - Ganga Sagar Express, passenger train in India
- Ganga Sagar (urn), a sacred Sikh relic
- Ganga Sagar (film), a 1978 Bollywood film
