= Kahani Ek Chor Ki =

- Theatrical release poster
- Directed by: S.Ramanathan
- Written by: K.B. Pathak; Ravindra Jain; Hasrat Jaipuri (lyrics)
- Produced by: Balubhai Shah
- Starring: Jeetendra; Moushumi Chatterjee; Vinod Mehra
- Cinematography: K. Ramanlal
- Edited by: A. Paul Duraisingam
- Music by: Ravindra Jain
- Production company: Deepak International
- Release date: 5 December 1981
- Running time: 138 minutes
- Country: India
- Language: Hindi

Kahani Ek Chor Ki (transl. Story of a Thief) is a 1981 Indian Hindi-language action drama film, produced by Balubhai Shah under the Deepak International banner, directed by S. Ramanathan. It stars Jeetendra, Moushumi Chatterjee, Vinod Mehra and music composed by Ravindra Jain. This was veteran actress, Lakshmi’s last Hindi film as a heroine, since she wanted to concentrate her acting career mostly down, towards the southern film industry. She would make her comeback to Bollywood industry after a gap of 25 years later with the film, Hulchul by playing Kareena Kapoor Khan’s grandmother and hasn't acted in any Hindi films further, since then.

== Cast ==
- Jeetendra as Ram / Micheal / Shantilal Shah
- Moushumi Chatterjee as Seeta
- Vinod Mehra as Shyam / Vilaiti
- Asrani as Kantilal
- Madan Puri as Shankar
- Ranjeet as Ranjeet
- A. K. Hangal as Seth Biharilal
- P. Jairaj as Vicky
- Mukri as Malyal Khan
- Chandrashekhar as CBI Inspector Surinder Chandra
- Ranjan
- Sunder as Vipin
- Viju Khote as Damodar
- Yunus Parvez as Denzongpa
- Nirupa Roy as Gauri
- Lakshmi as Geeta
- Aruna Irani as Item Dancer
- Master Tito as Raju

== Soundtrack ==
Song	Singer	Lyricist
"Karishma Yeh Kya Ho Gaya"	Kishore Kumar, Hemlata	Hasrat Jaipuri
"Sabko Muraden Milti Hain"	Kishore Kumar, Asha Bhosle	Ravindra Jain
"Yeh Raat Sard Sard Hai"	Asha Bhosle	Hasrat Jaipuri
"Chor Chor Ko Pakadte"	Mahendra Kapoor, Hemlata, K. J. Yesudas	Ravindra Jain
