= Harishchandra Shaibya =

1985 Bengali film

Harishchandra Shaibya is a Bengali religious drama film directed by Ardhendu Chatterjee based on Hindu mythological story of legendary King Harishchandra. This film was released on 30 August 1985 under the banner of B. B. M. Group Of Production.

== Plot ==
This film tells the story of the life of King Harishchandra who gave away his kingdom, sold his family and agreed to be a slave to fulfill the promise and truthfulness.

== Cast ==
- Biswajit Chatterjee as Harishchandra
- Sandhya Roy as Shaibya
- Chiranjit
- Abhi Bhattacharya as Sage Viswamitra
- Utpal Dutt as Dharmaraj
- Alka Nupur as Menaka
- Anoop Kumar as Malavya
- Tapas Paul (guest appearance)
- Shekhar Chatterjee
- Satya Bandopadhyay as Sage Vasistha
- Sumitra Mukhopadhyay

== Soundtrack ==
Music by Ravindra Jain. Lyrics by Bibhuti Mukhopadhyay. Songs sung by Kishore Kumar, Asha Bhonsle, Aarti Mukherjee, Hemant Mukherjee, Manna De, Hemlata, Yesudas. 1 song which Ravindra Jain sang was excluded from the film.

1. Drama Drimi Drimi - Kishore Kumar
2. O Ma Patito Paboni Gonge - Kishore Kumar
3. Keno Mukhe - Asha Bhonsle
4. Shunaho Manush Bhai - Hemant Mukherjee
5. Shunno Holo Ajodha - Manna De
6. Bhor Hoilo Phool Phutilo - Manna De, Hemlata
7. Bhalo Koro - Hemlata
8. Tamasi Mam Jivanam - Aarti Mukherjee
9. Om Namah Shivay - Yesudas, Aarti Mukherjee
10. Shlok - Yesudas, Aarti Mukherjee
11. Thakur Tomar Ae Ki Leela - Ravindra Jain
