= Daku Aur Mahatma =

- Directed by: Ravikant Nagaich
- Produced by: Pari A V Mohan
- Music by: Ravindra Jain
- Release date: 1977
- Country: India
- Language: Hindi

Daku Aur Mahatma is a 1977 Bollywood action film directed by Ravigant Nagaich. The film was released under the banner of Radha Mohan Arts.

== Cast ==
- Rajendra Kumar as Laxman Singh / Dilawar Singh
- Reena Roy as Kiran
- Kabir Bedi as Sangram Singh
- Yogeeta Bali as Vandana
- Raza Murad as Inspector Kailash Mathur
- Mushtaq Merchant as Truck Cleaner
- Mehmood Jr as Hamid
- Leena Das as Singer/Courtesan
- Narendra Nath
- Kamal Kapoor

== Soundtrack ==
The music of the film was composed by Ravindra Jain.

#	Song	Singer
1	"Angoothi Angoothi"	Asha Bhosle
2	"Suno Suno Re Mera Sandesh"	Asha Bhosle
3	"Kajarwa Ne Maare Kayi Naujawan"	Asha Bhosle
4	"Jaat Na Poochho Saddu Ki"	Asha Bhosle, Mohammed Rafi
5	"Ho Meri Pyaari Jalebi Rashbhari"	Amit Kumar, Hemlata
6	"Hansti Aankhon Ko Jisne Aansoo Diye"	Mahendra Kapoor, Hemlata, Jaspal Singh
