= Dulhan Wahi Jo Piya Man Bhaye =

1977 film by Lekh Tandon

- Directed by: Lekh Tandon
- Produced by: Tarachand Barjatya
- Starring: Prem Krishen; Rameshwari
- Cinematography: Jehangir Choudhary
- Music by: Ravindra Jain
- Release date: 1977
- Country: India
- Language: Hindi
- Budget: ₹0.9 million
- Box office: ₹35 million (worldwide)

Dulhan Wahi Jo Piya Man Bhaye (transl. Bride is one whom the groom likes) is a 1977 Hindi musical drama film. Produced by Tarachand Barjatya for Rajshri, the film is directed by Lekh Tandon. The film stars Prem Krishen, Rameshwari, Madan Puri, Jagdeep and Iftekhar. It was a Super Hit of the year.The music is by Ravindra Jain who also marked his singing debut with Achra Mein Phoolwa Leke song. The film has the same storyline as Tamasha and 1941 Hollywood film It Started with Eve. The movie was remade in Tamil as Marumagal.

== Plot ==
Seth Harikrishan, the industrialist had as his heir, his only grandson Prem. The grandfather's only desire was to see the bride of his grandson. When he fell seriously ill, his friend and doctor Farid prevailed upon Prem to bring his girl friend Rita, whom he wanted to marry. But as luck would have it, Rita had gone away to Srinagar to participate in a fashion show and she could not return, as due to snowfall all roads were blocked and air service was suspended. To satisfy his dying grandfather, Prem suggested to his company's Public Relations Officer Jagdish to hire a model girl who could pose as Rita for some time. Instead, Jagdish brought an illiterate flower seller girl Kammo, with whom Prem and his sweetheart Rita had many altercations. Kammo settles into the house and wins over Seth Harikrishan and to a degree, even Prem. But soon Rita returns, followed by her scheming mercenary mother played by Shashikala. Yet all their forced efforts to win the grandfather's favours fail. Ultimately, on his birthday, Shashikala exposes Kammo's humble background to Dr. Farid. At the party, the flower girl's true identity becomes apparent to everyone. Despite this, Seth Harikrishan announces Prem's engagement to "Rita" (flower girl Kammo), whom he had really liked. An enraged Prem threatens to leave the house along with his girlfriend and her mother. The grandfather does not stop him. Prem rushes to Rita but is shocked to find that without the cushion of his family's wealth, his love and sacrifice hold no meaning for her or her mother. Meanwhile, Kammo, hurt and disillusioned, decides to leave the house for good. Prem realises his mistake and accepts Kammo as his bride.

== Cast ==
- Prem Krishen as Prem
- Rameshwari as Kammo/ fake Rita
- Madan Puri as Seth Harikrishan, Prem's grandfather
- Shyamlee as Rita
- Iftekhar as Dr. Farid
- Leela Mishra as housekeeper
- Shashikala as Mrs. Saxena, Rita's mother
- Viju Khote as traffic Inspector
- Jagdeep as Jagdish, company PRO
- Savita Bajaj as Sethji's nurse
- Sunder as Sethji's domestic help

== Soundtrack ==
Ravindra Jain is the lyricist and composer for all songs.

| # | Title | Singer(s) | Duration |
|---|---|---|---|
| 1 | "Le Toh Aaye Ho Hame Sapno" (Sajna-O-Sajna) | Hemlata | 03:34 |
| 2 | "Khushiyan Hi Khushiyan" | K. J. Yesudas, Banashree Sengupta, Hemlata | 04:56 |
| 3 | "Mangal Bhawan Amangal Hari" (Ramayan – Chaupaiyan) | Hemlata | 04:59 |
| 4 | "Ab Ranj Se Khushe Se" (Mahv-E-Khayal-E-Yaar Hain) | Hemlata | 04:33 |
| 5 | "Jaha Prem Ka Paavan Diyara Jale" | Hemlata | 04:08 |
| 6 | "Puravaiyaa Ke Jhonke Aaye" | Hemlata | 04:16 |
| 7 | "Shyama O Shyama, Raama Ho Raama" | Hemlata | 04:56 |
| 8 | "Acharaa Men Phulavaa Lai Ke" | Ravindra Jain | 05:28 |
| 9 | "Baj Jayega" | Mohammed Rafi, Hemlata | 04:59 |

== Box office ==
In India, the film net earnings of ₹22.5 million. It was declared a 'Super Hit' at the box office, becoming the seventh-highest grossing Indian film of 1977.

== Awards ==
- Filmfare Best Dialogue Award - Vrajendra Gaur
- Filmfare Best Screenplay Award - Lekh Tandon, Vrajendra Gaur, Madhusudan Kalelkar
