= Sadhana Singh =

Indian film and television actress

- Born: Sadhana Singh; Varanasi, Uttar Pradesh, India
- Occupations: Actress; Singer
- Years active: 1982–present
- Known for: Gunja in Nadiya Ke Paar
- Notable work: Nadiya Ke Paar, Piya Milan, Sasural, Sur Sangam, Jugni
- Spouse: Rajkumar Shahabadi
- Children: Sheena Shahabadi

Sadhana Singh is an Indian actress who appears in Hindi films and television. Her first magazine shot was done by Pardeep Mishra. She started her film career with the 1982 film Nadiya Ke Paar, by writer-director Govind Moonis.

Sadhana attained popularity after the release of the film Nadiya Ke Paar and started being called Gunja, the character she played in the film. Gunja was an innocent looking village girl who fell in love with Chandan, brother-in-law of her elder sister, in the film. She has acted in more than twenty Bollywood and Indian regional language films. Jugni, Mukkabaaz, and Super 30 are some of her recent films. Apart from films, she also acted in many popular TV serials.

== Early life ==
Sadhana was born into a Hindu family in Varanasi, Uttar Pradesh. Her family hails from the Indian state of Punjab.

== Personal life ==
She is married to film producer Rajkumar Shahabadi. Rajkumar is the son of Vishwanath Prasad Shahabadi – a film producer from Shahabad, Bihar who was involved in producing Bhojpuri cinema's first film, Ganga Maiyya Tohe Piyari Chadhaibo. The couple has a daughter and a son. Her daughter Sheena Shahabadi is also an actress. She also has a sister named, Surinder Kaur Singh who is also a television actress who is famous for her roles of Amrit Balwant Walia in Jassi Jaissi Koi Nahin and Uma Rajendra Pratapsingh in Banoo Main Teri Dulhann.

== Filmography ==
Year	Film	Role	Notes
1982	Nadiya Ke Paar	Gunja	
1984	Sasural	Chanda	
1985	Piya Milan		
1985	Papi Sansar		
1985	Yeh Kaisa Farz		
1985	Sur Sangam	Sharda	
1985	Tulsi		
1986	Durgaa Maa	Parvati	
1987	Parivaar	Bobby's mother	
1987	Nafrat		
1988	Falak	Shanti	
1989	Aurat Aur Patthar		
1991	Pyar Ka Sawan		
1994	Aag Aandhi Aur Toofan		
2016	Jugni	Bibi Saroop	
2017	Mukkabaaz	Meera Mishra, Sunaina's mother	
2019	Super 30	Jayanti Kumar	
2019	Zindagi Tumse	Mamta	
2022	Guilty Minds	Mumtaz	

|2022 |Dronacharya |Shakuntala Shastri |

== TV series ==
Year	Shows	Role	Notes
1997	Ghar Jamai	Paghwan/Prakash Kaur/Parkash beebi	
1998	X Zone		
2001	Maan	Vandana Kathpalia	
2001	Chalti Ka Naam Antakshar		
2001	Kabhi To Milenge		
2003	Pyar Zindagi Hai		
2004	Saarrthi	Shakuntala Goenka	
2004	Prratima		
2006	Pyaar Ke Do Naam: Ek Raadha, Ek Shyaam	Mamata Sahay	
2008	Kis Desh Mein Hai Meraa Dil	Tejassi "Teji" Maan	
2011	Phulwa	Sharbati's mother	
2014	Hamari Sister Didi	Kamini Kapoor	
2015	Santoshi Maa	Vidya Raghavendra Mishra	
