= Kasam Suhaag Ki =

- Poster
- Directed by: Mohan Segal
- Written by: Ali Raza
- Produced by: N. P. Singh
- Starring: Dharmendra; Rekha
- Music by: Laxmikant–Pyarelal
- Release date: 27 January 1989 (India)
- Country: India
- Language: Hindi

Kasam Suhaag Ki is a 1989 Bollywood film directed by Mohan Segal and starring Dharmendra and Rekha.

== Cast ==
- Dharmendra as Thakur Sultan Singh
- Rekha as Surajmukhi /Shama
- Sushma Seth as Thakurain Rukmani Singh
- Jagdeep as Daku Kalha
- Om Shivpuri as Thakur Shankar Singh
- Suresh Oberoi as Inspector Dildar Dawood
- Danny Denzongpa as Daku Lohari
- Alok Nath as HS Hukumat Singh
- Gulshan Grover as Thakur Yuvraaj Singh

== Soundtrack ==
#	Title	Singer(s)
1	"Aa Gale Lag Ja"	Anuradha Paudwal
2	"Aa Gale Lag Ja v2"	Anuradha Paudwal
3	"Chiraiya Ko Baaz Liye Jaye"	Anuradha Paudwal
4	"Idhar Bhi Bijlee"	Kavita Krishnamurthy
5	"Main Ho Gayee Deewani"	Hemlata

== Reception ==
Democratic World magazine wrote a critical review of the film and wrote that its stars "cannot save it from sinking".
