= Minda Poochakku Kalyanam =

1990 film by Alleppey Ashraf

- Directed by: Alleppey Ashraf
- Written by: Jagadish
- Produced by: Alleppey Ashraf
- Starring: Suresh Gopi; Mukesh; Sreenivasan; Lissy Priyadarsan
- Cinematography: N. Srikumar
- Edited by: Bhoominathan
- Music by: Raveendran
- Release date: 28 July 1990
- Running time: 100 minutes
- Country: India
- Language: Malayalam

Minda Poochakku Kalyanam is a 1990 Indian Malayalam-language film, directed by Alleppey Ashraf, starring Suresh Gopi and Lissy Priyadarsan in the lead roles. The film is a remake of Hindi film Chitchor (1976).

== Plot ==
Balaraman Pillai is a well-to-do villager living in Kuttanadu. He and his wife Sarasamma are looking for a suitable alliance for their younger daughter Mini. Balaraman Pillai receives a letter from his son-in-law, Ayyappan Kutty, living in Madras informing that an engineer named Kumar from his company is arriving in the village to oversee a construction project. Ayyappan Kutty suggests Kumar as a suitable groom for Mini.

Kumar arrives in the village and is received by Balaraman Pillai, who arranges accommodation for Kumar. Balaraman Pillai invites Kumar home for dinner and introduces Mini. Kumar and Mini develop a liking for each other. With encouragement from her parents, Mini and Kumar fall in love with each other. Their meetings are always chaperoned by Kuttu, young son of Sahadevan.

A comic sub plot runs in parallel where the village postman Kamalasanan is in love with Chandramathi, while his friend Sahadevan is afraid of his hard talking wife Parukkutty Amma.

Balaraman Pillai receives another letter from Ayyappan Kutty stating that Kumar is not the engineer, but an overseer of the same company. This changes Balaraman Pillai and Sarasamma's attitude towards Kumar. They forbid Mini from meeting Kumar. The plot thickens as the engineer Krishnakumar arrives in the village. Mini gets pressured from her parents to make a good impression with Krishnakumar, which makes her sad and angry. Their engagement is fixed soon and kumar decides to leave the village to madras. Krishnakumar gets to know the truth about Mini and Kumar and says that they should be together. Meanwhile, Mini and Kuttu take a small boat and row towards the boat jetty to see Kumar before he leaves. Unfortunately, they both drown in the backwaters and the movie ends on a tragic note.

== Cast ==
- Suresh Gopi as Kumar
- Lissy Priyadarsan as Mini
- Mukesh as Krishnakumar
- Sankaradi as Balaraman Pillai, Mini's father
- Sukumari as Sarasamma, Mini's mother
- Jagathy Sreekumar as Sahadevan, Parukkutty's husband
- Sreenivasan as Kamalasanan, postman
- Lalithasree as Parukkutty Amma
- Soorya as Chandramathi
- Bobby Kottarakkara as Idiyan Podiyan Pillai
