= Raju Shrestha =

Actor

- Born: Fahim Ajani; Dongri, Mumbai, India
- Other name: Master Raju
- Occupation: actor
- Years active: 1969–2022
- Spouse: Seema Roshan Ajani

Raju Shrestha (born Fahim Ajani; 15 August 1966), known by his stage name Master Raju or Master Rajoo, is an Indian film and television actor, who started his film career as a child actor, in the 1970s.

Raju has acted in films like Gulzar's Parichay, Hrishikesh Mukherjee's Bawarchi (1972), Yash Chopra's Daag: A Poem of Love (1973), Basu Chatterjee's Chitchor (1976) and Gulzar's Kitaab (1977).

Over the years, he has acted in around 200 films and a few television series.

He won the National Film Award for Best Child Artist for his role in Chitchor (1976).

He was seen in the youth show Ziddi Dil Maane Na where he played Prem Deshpremi.

== Filmography ==
=== Film ===
- Shart (1969)
- Amar Prem (1972)
- Bawarchi (1972)
- Parichay (1972)
- Nafrat (1973)
- Daag: A Poem of Love (1973)
- Abhimaan (1973)
- Deewaar (1975)
- Khushboo (1975)
- Chitchor (1976)
- Jeevan Jyoti (1976)
- Kitaab (1977)
- Inkaar (1977)
- Kasum Khoon Ki (1977)
- Palkon Ki Chhaon Mein (1977)
- Khatta Meetha (1978)
- Tumhari Kasam (1978)
- Ankhiyon Ke Jharokhon Se (1978)
- Chakravyuha (1978)
- Badalte Rishtey (1978)
- Nalayak (1978)
- Aatish (1979)
- Dhan Daulat (1980)
- Krodhi (1981)
- Hamari Bahu Alka (1982)
- Khud-Daar (1982)
- Nastik (1983)
- Woh Saat Din (1983)
- Love in Goa (1983)
- Charanon Ki Saugandh (1988)
- Baaghi (1990)
- Afsana Pyar Ka (1991)
- Saathi (1991)
- Paayal (1992)
- Balwaan (1992)
- Anari (1993)
- Phool (1993)
- Shatranj (1993) as Dinky's friend
- Rang (1993) as Jojo (Yogi & Kajal's college friend)
- Khuddar (1994)
- Aag (1994)
- Saajan Chale Sasural (1996) as Shyam's friend
- Dil Tera Diwana (1996)
- Diljale (1996)
- Hum Aapke Dil Mein Rehte Hain (1999)
- Dil Hi Dil Mein (2000) as Raju
- Maseeha (2002)
- Inth Ka Jawab Patthar (2002)
- Brij Kau Birju (2000) (Brajbhasha Movie)
- Pati Ho To Aisa (2004)
- Ek Aur Prem Kahani (2004)
- Jaago (2004)
- Black Friday (2004)
- Khamoshh... Khauff Ki Raat (2005)

=== Television ===
Year	Serial	Role	Channel	Ref
1987	Chunauti	-	DD National	
1994	Zee Horror Show	-	Zee TV	
1995	Chhodo Baat Purani (TV)	-		
1997	Byomkesh Bakshi (Episode: Vansh Ka Khoon)	Satyakam Das	DD National	
1997	Aaha	Special appearance		
1997	Jai Hanuman	Sage Narada	DD National	
1999	Dam Dama Dam	Dance master	Zee TV	
2008	Ssshhhh...Phir Koi Hai – Do Gaz Zameen Ke Neeche	(Episode 72 & 73)	STAR One	
2008	Ssshhhh...Phir Koi Hai – Divyaastra	(Episode 96 & 97)	STAR One	
2008	Ssshhhh...Phir Koi Hai – Khooni Aankade	(Episode 124 & 125)	STAR One	
2009	Ssshhhh...Phir Koi Hai – Qayamat	Damroo (Episode 166–173)	STAR One	
2011-2013	Adaalat	Jaggi Malhotra/Pappu Padwal/Abhigyan Rohra	Sony TV	
2011-2013	CID	Various character roles	Sony TV	
2013-2014	Bani – Ishq Da Kalma	Kuljeet Singh Bhullar	Colors TV	
2013-2015	Bharat Ka Veer Putra – Maharana Pratap	Mia Tansen	Sony TV	
2015	Badii Devrani	Swaroop Chand (Mausa)	&TV	
2016	Saab Ji		DD National	
2017	TV Biwi Aur Main	Channel head, new boss	Sony SAB	
2020	Nazar 2	Randeep Parekh (Randeep Mama)	StarPlus	
2021–2022	Ziddi Dil Maane Na	Prem Deshpremi (Prem Ji)	Sony SAB	

== Dubbing career ==
Raju has dubbed for Suraj Sharma's role as the 16-year-old "Pi" in the Hindi dubbed version of the film, Life of Pi.

== Dubbing roles ==
=== Live action films ===
Film title	Actor	Character	Dub Language	Original Language	Original Year Release	Dub Year Release	Notes
Life of Pi	Suraj Sharma	Pi (Age 16)	Hindi	English	2012	2012	
