= Aakhri Kasam =

1979 Indian Hindi film

- Directed by: Dinesh-Ramnesh
- Written by: Faiz Saleem
- Starring: Kabir Bedi; Vinod Mehra; Yogeeta Bali
- Music by: Ravindra Jain
- Release date: 1979
- Running time: 126 minutes
- Country: India
- Language: Hindi

Aakhri Kasam is a 1979 Bollywood action film directed by Dinesh-Ramnesh. The film stars Kabir Bedi, Vinod Mehra, Yogeeta Bali and Om Shivpuri in lead roles.

== Plot ==
Jagga, a labour lives in a village with his baby and wife. Local zamindar raped and killed his wife and son. Jagga wants to avenge the death of her family but he could not. He abducts Zamindar's sons, and brings him up as a good man with high morality.

== Cast ==
- Kabir Bedi as Kishan / Badal
- Vinod Mehra as Inspector Ram
- Yogeeta Bali as Champa
- Madan Puri as Malang Baba
- Om Shivpuri as Zamindar Thakur Ranbir Singh
- Urmila Bhatt as Zamindar's Wife
- Nazir Hussain as Mangal
- Satyendra Kapoor as Jagga
- Mohan Sherry as Durjan Singh
- Imtiaz Khan as Sangram Singh

== Music ==
Music was by Ravindra Jain. Lyrics were written by Ravindra Jain and Dev Kohli.

Song	Singer	Lyricist
"Tera Rang Bada Hai"	Mohammed Rafi	Dev Kohli
"Humse Chhupao Na Ji"	Suman Kalyanpur, Hemlata	Ravindra Jain
"Jai Bhawani"	Hemlata	Ravindra Jain
"Le Daal De"	Sulakshana Pandit	Ravindra Jain
