= Kotwal Saab =

- Directed by: Hrishikesh Mukherjee
- Written by: Bimal Dutt
- Produced by: Pawan Kumar
- Starring: Shatrughan Sinha; Aparna Sen; Utpal Dutt; Asrani
- Cinematography: Jaywant R. Pathare
- Edited by: Subhash Gupta
- Music by: Ravindra Jain
- Production company: Amiya Arts
- Release date: 10 June 1977
- Country: India
- Language: Hindi

Kotwal Saab (Police Officer) is a 1977 Bollywood drama action film directed by Hrishikesh Mukherjee. An Amiya Arts production, it was produced by Pawan Kumar and had story by Bimal Dutt, with dialogue by Rahi Masoom Reza. The music director and lyricist was Ravindra Jain. The main stars were Shatrughan Sinha and Aparna Sen with a supporting cast consisting of Utpal Dutt, Asrani, David, Raza Murad, Sudhir and Ritu Kamal.

Shatrughan Sinha's successful debut film in a lead role with director Subhash Ghai's Kalicharan (1976), had made him popular with the audiences. In Kotwal Saab Sinha plays a morally upright strict police-officer who is out to catch the corrupt politician who is also a smuggler and don.

== Plot ==
Bharat Prasad Sinha (Shatrughan Sinha) is the new Deputy Superintendent of Police (DSP) in town. He has been assigned the task by Police Commissioner Ramesh Kulkarni (Om Shivpuri). The Commissioner informs him that Dharam Kohli (Utpal Dutt), who is standing as an MLA in the upcoming elections, is also involved with smuggling activities. On taking charge Bharat has to suspend Inspector Thakur (Manmohan) for corruption charges and being in league with Kohli. Bharat now takes charge as Inspector, keeping his real identity a secret, he is then informed by sources about Mahesh (Sudhir), one of the Kohli's (also referred to as Don) henchman. He goes to arrest Mahesh at his house where Mahesh stays with his mother and sister. There Bharat has a confrontation with Prabha (Aparna Sen), who is a family friend. Aparna stays as a lodger with a kind-hearted old gentleman, John Fernandes (David). Mahesh goes to Prabha's room at night and tries to get her to take a letter to his mother which will be collected by Kohli's men. Prabha refuses saying she won't be party to any of Mahesh's wrongdoings. The conversation is overheard by Bharat and his team, who arrest Mahesh as soon as he leaves the premises.

Bharat has Kohli arrested but has to let him go when Kohli suffers a minor heart attack and is rushed to hospital. Bharat decides to work undercover, and working covertly in tandem with the Police Commissioner, he officially resigns from the police force. The town people side with the Don-politician and refuse to help Bharat now that he's no longer a police officer. Looking for accommodation, he reaches Fernandes' house where Prabha stays as a lodger. The honest Fernandes and Prabha are soon won over to Bharat's side and he starts staying there as a lodger.

Prabha is sent a false telegram by the Kohli's men stating her mother is ill; they then inform Bharat that Prabha is in danger. Bharat goes after her and they reach Prabha's mother's house. There Bharat discloses his feelings and asks Prabha to marry him. After marriage, Bharat takes her to his own house where Prabha meets Bharat's sister Saraswati (Ritu Kanwal), who Bharat wants to have nothing to do with. On questioning, Bharat tells Prabha that his sister had an affair with a man and became pregnant before marriage. Aparna pleads that she is now married to the same man and Bharat should forgive her. He refuses to reconcile with his sister, calling her characterless.

On their return to town, Bharat learns that Mahesh has escaped. Bharat lets his co-officer, Inspector Ved (Raza Murad) know that he is still in the force. With Mahesh's help Awasthi (Asrani), working for Kohli, gets hold of incriminating photos of Prabha and Mahesh from their past relationship. He blackmails Prabha to get him a file Bharat has been working on that will help arrest Kohli. When Prabha refuses, Mahesh barges into the police station and informs Bharat about Prabha and his earlier relationship. Bharat is horrified to learn of his wife's affair and when Prabha refuses to answer his questions, he breaks up with her. Meanwhile, Kohli and Awasthi are arrested and brought to the police station. Kohli manages to get hold of Inspector Zaidi"s gun and in the scramble, Bharat is shot. While waiting for the ambulance he asks to see his wife. When Prabha arrives he asks her forgiveness and also tells her to ask Saraswati to forgive him. Bharat survives the operation and is united with Prabha.

== Cast ==
- Shatrughan Sinha as Inspector / DSP Bharat Pratap Sinha
- Aparna Sen as Prabha Sinha
- Raza Murad as Inspector Raza Zaidi
- Utpal Dutt as Dharam Kohli
- Asrani as Mohan Lal Awasthi 'MLA'
- Sudhir as Mahesh
- David as John Fernandes
- Om Shivpuri as Police Commissioner
- Manmohan as Inspector Thakur
- Ritu Kamal as Saraswati (Bharat's Sister)
- Kanu Roy as Kohli's Henchman
- Padma Khanna as Courtesan
- Dulari as Prabha's Aunty
- Mridula Rani as Prabha's Mother

== Crew ==
The crew consisted of:

- Producer: Pawan Kumar
- Production House: Amiya Arts Production
- Director: Hrishikesh Mukherjee
- Story: Bimal Dutt
- Dialogue: Rahi Masoom Reza
- Music and Lyrics: Ravindra Jain
- Cinematography: Jaywant R. Pathare
- Editing: Subhash Gupta
- Sound editing:
- Art Director: Ajit Bannerjee
- Audiography: George D'Cruz
- Song recording: Robin Chatterjee
- Make-up: N. S. Satam
- Choreographer: Gopikrishan, Naidu
- Stunt: Mohammad Ali

== Production ==
=== Director ===
==== Hrishikesh Mukherji ====
While directing Kotwal Saab Mukherjee had already faced failure at the box-office with Alaap (1977), which starred Amitabh Bachchan and Rekha. Mukherjee's health had started deteriorating and he was unable to give his full attention to the film making process. In Film World Vol 14, T. M. Ramachandran stated that both Alaap (Musical Ascent) and Kotwal Saab were "too bad to be true", further citing the probable reason for this by saying that "The confusion that marks his approach to 'Alaap' and 'Kotwal Saab' can only be attributed to his uncertain health".

=== Cast ===
==== Shatrughan Sinha ====
Hrishikesh Mukherjee cast Shatrughan Sinha in the title role of a police officer. Sinha had switched from playing his trade-mark "slick and polished" negative character roles in the mid-1970s, to play the main hero. His "flamboyant villain" roles had his popularity "soaring high" with the audiences. His successful debut film in a lead role with Subhash Ghai's Kalicharan (1976), turned out to be a "major success" and paved the way for him to work with the best directors of the time. For Kotwal Saab Mukherjee had to focus on Sinha's image "persona". He had to "de-image" him and according to Mukherjee, everything functioned smoothly during rehearsals, calling the acting while rehearsing "excellent". However, in front of the cameras Sinha would be back to "playing Shatrughan Sinha".

==== Aparna Sen ====
Aparna Sen, a Bengali film actress, had acted in two Hindi films earlier, Vishwas (1969) directed by Kewal P. Kashyap co-starring Jeetendra, and Imaan Dharam (1977) opposite Shashi Kapoor and Amitabh Bachchan, directed by Desh Mukherji. She was not at ease doing the roles and the films fared poorly at the box-office. According to S. K. Pal in the chapter on Sen titled "Feminist Consciousness in Aparna Sen's Film" in N. D. R. Chandra's book Multicultural Literature in India: Critical Perceptions, Sen found that the focus in Bombay films was more on glamour than on acting. However, by the time she did Kotwal Saab she had become "much more comfortable" with the system and more confident in her acting.

== Reception ==
Kotwal Saab was described as an average film by Film World and was not a commercial success at the box-office. However, the film has been cited as one of Aparna Sen's "popular" films.

== Soundtrack ==
The music composition and lyrics were by Ravindra Jain. The singers were Asha Bhosle and Hemlata.

=== Songlist ===
Song	Singer	Lyricist
"Saathi Re, Bhool Na Jaana"	Asha Bhosle	Ravindra Jain
"Hamara Balma Be-imaan"	Asha Bhosle	Hasrat Jaipuri
"Suman Saman Tum Apna"	Hemlata	Ravindra Jain
