= Aatish (film) =

1979 film

- Theatrical release poster
- Directed by: Ambrish Sangal
- Written by: Mushtaq Jalili; Ravindra Jain (lyrics)
- Produced by: Mohan Kumar
- Starring: Jeetendra; Neetu Singh
- Cinematography: K. K. Mahajan; S.N. Dubey
- Edited by: Pratap Bhatt
- Music by: Ravindra Jain
- Production company: EMKAY Enterprises
- Release date: 23 February 1979
- Running time: 146 minutes
- Country: India
- Language: Hindi

Aatish (transl. Fire) is a 1979 Hindi-language action film, produced by Mohan Kumar under the EMKAY Enterprises banner and directed by Ambrish Sangal. It stars Jeetendra, Neetu Singh in the pivotal roles and music composed by Ravindra Jain. The film was remade as Telugu movie Devudichina Koduku (1980).

== Plot ==
Mr. Rai is a wealthy businessman in Jammu, India, and lives in a palatial house with his wife, Shobha, eldest son Rakesh, daughter Ashu, and a school-going son, Raju. His son, Rakesh despises him and is waiting for him to die so that he can inherit all his wealth and splurge it on dancing, girls, alcohol, and gambling. One day while Rai was returning from the bank with a suitcase full of 5 lakh rupees cash, he is attacked by bandits but is rescued by a young man, Anand. Anand gets injured in this attack but saves both money as well as Rai. So Rai takes him to his home for medical care & slowly Anand becomes familiar with Rai's family while recuperating. Seeing his good behavior and sincere trust for his family, Rai starts trusting Anand and appoints him as a Chief Supervisor in his fruit juice export factory. Rakesh is at loggerheads with Anand due to one of their road fights earlier. One day, Anand uses fisticuffs to convince Rai Sahab's business rival named Girdhari to let go of encroachment on Rai's property. Rai and his family get so impressed by this that they promote him to the Manager post. One day, Rakesh comes to the factory demanding money but Anand being the custodian refuses. Rakesh gets infuriated and lays a trap for Anand in swindling of 2 Lakhs of office cash. But his plan is exposed and this provokes Rai Sahab to ask Rakesh to leave his family also, Rai Sahab secretly makes his will, naming Anand as the sole heir to his property. What the Rai family does not know is that Anand works for villain Girdhari and enacted this charade just to get in the good books of the Rai family - his motive was to steal a diamond-studded statue passed down family generations to Rai Sahab and is estimate-valued in crores. Though a change of heart happens Anand being blackmailed by Girdhari tries to steal the statue. During this robbery in progress, Mr. & Mrs. Rai caught him red-handed and shocked Rai Sahab gets a heart attack and dies. Now all family members distrust Anand and ask him to leave the city.

Distraught & guilty Anand, preparing to leave is stopped by his lover, Shanno, who suggests that the family might need his help as Rakesh has now returned to the house and taken control. Rakesh and Girdhari both try to usurp Rai Sahab's property but Anand and Shanno foil all their evil plans.

Towards the end, Rakesh realizes his mistakes. Shobha and the family accept Rakesh and Anand as genuinely their own and everything is sorted out for a pleasant ending.

== Cast ==
- Jeetendra as Anand
- Neetu Singh as Shanno
- Madan Puri as Girdhari
- Sujit Kumar as Khan (Bank Manager)
- Nirupa Roy as Shobha Rai
- Om Shivpuri as Mr. Rai
- Mukri as Diwan Chhotelal
- Dheeraj Kumar as Rakesh Rai
- Brahm Bhardwaj as Rai's Lawyer
- Birbal as Gambler
- Mumtaz Begum as Shanno's Mother
- Master Raju as Raju Rai
- Leena Das as Item Dancer

== Soundtrack ==
Lyricist: Ravindra Jain

Song	Singer
"Sharaab Hai, Shabaab Hai"	Mohammed Rafi
"O Babu Managera Ve, O Babu Managera Ve"	Mohammed Rafi, Lata Mangeshkar
"Oh Meri Ladli, Pyari Behna, Rani Behna"	Mohammed Rafi, Hemlata
"Kahin Naam Na Apna Likh Dena Kisi Ulte Seedhe Kaagaz Par"	Mohammed Rafi, Asha Bhosle, Hemlata
"Ho Rabba, Ladke Ke Bhes Mein Ladki Hoon"	Asha Bhosle
"Main Nehla Thi Bas Nehla, Nehle Ko Mil Gaya Dehla"	Asha Bhosle
