= Inder Thakur =

Indian author

External image
- Image of Thakur and his wife and child

Inder Hiralal Thakur (1950 – 23 June 1985) was an Indian actor, fashion designer, and model who also worked as a purser on Air India. He married to Priya, and the two had a son, Vishal Kiran Thakur. Inder Thakur won the 1985 International Fashion Designer award during the World Modeling Association convention in New York City in 1985. He died at age 35, along with Priya and their child, in the bombing of Air India Flight 182. He was the youngest son of actor Hiralal.

== Filmography ==
- Nadiya Ke Paar (1982 film) – Omkar (Elder brother of Chandan).
- Chatpati (1983 film) – Chhote Thakur
- Hero (1983) – Yuvraaj
- Tulsi (1985) Movie – Ganesh Singh
