= Jaspal Singh (singer) =

Punjabi indian singer

Jaspal Singh is an Indian singer who lent his voice to various Bollywood actors of 1970s and 1980s. He was born on 23rd March , 1943 in Village Bir Amin ,Kurukshetra,Haryana,. Jaspal Singh from a very young age and during his school and colleges days, he used to sing in various singing competitions. To further pursue his passion for singing he went to Mumbai where his sister used to stay. His talent was first and foremost recognised by well known female singer Usha Khanna during 1968. He was provided a chance to sing at a Professional level, however he did not get the recognition which he deserved. He struggled to make a career in singing and would often visit Amritsar, Delhi and Mumbai time and again. Due to pressure from his father he started practising law and started living in Mumbai. In spite of the hardships he never gave up. And then, a well known Music Composer, Ravindra Jain gave him the big break for a song in the movie called 'Geet Gata Chal' of 1975. After this song, he became a household name. His voice was unique and was unlike any other and he sang for hit movies like 'Nadiya ke paar', Ankhiyon ke jharokhon se','Sawan ko aane do' amongst others.

== Songs ==
Here is list of Jaspal Singh hit songs from Indian films

Songs	Composer	Other Performers	Film
Dekho Logo, Ye Kaisa Zamana, Sambhalo Sambhalo	Usha Khanna	Usha Khanna	Bandish
Beta Khel Mat Matkao	Usha Khanna	Mahendra Kapoor	Anjaan Hai Koi
Dharti Meri Maata Pita Aasmaan	Ravindra Jain		Geet Gaata Chal
Geet Gaata Chal O Saathi Gungunaata Chal	Ravindra Jain		Geet Gaata Chal
Mangal bhavan amangal haari dravahu sudasarath ajar bihaari	Ravindra Jain		Geet Gaata Chal
Chaupaiyan Ramayan	Ravindra Jain		Geet Gaata Chal
Shyam Teri Bansi Pukare Radha Nam	Ravindra Jain	Arti Mukherji	Geet Gaata Chal
Mohe Chhota Mila Bhartaar	Ravindra Jain	Hemlata, Chetan	Geet Gaata Chal
Angan mein aayi bahaar bhawji	Ravindra Jain	Ravindra Jain	Nadiya Ke Paar
Bade Badayi Naa Kare Bade Naa Bole Bol	Ravindra Jain	Hemlata	Ankhiyon Ke Jharokhon Se
Bas ek yehi vardan aaj ham maang rahe kartaar se	C Arjun Kavi Pradeep		Karwa Chauth
Gagan yeh samjhe chaand sukhi hai	Rajkamal	Madan Bharati	Saawan Ko Aane Do
Jab jab tu mere saamne aaye	Ravindra Jain	Anjaan	Shyam Tere Kitne Naam
Jinkhoja tin paaiyaan gahre paani paitha	Rajkamal Maya Govind		Payal Ki Jhankar
Kaun Disa Mein Leke Chala Re Batuhiya		Hemlata	Nadiya Ke Paar (1982)
O Sathi Dukh Mein Hi Sukh Hai Chhipa Re	Rajkamal	Jaspal Singh	Saawan Ko Aane Do
Oh re babua	Laxmikant Pyarelal	Anand Bakshi	All Rounder
Rang leke deewaane aa gaye rangon mein	Ravindra Jain		Zid
Saathi re kabhi apna saath na choote	Ravindra Jain Anjaan		Shyam Tere Kitne Naam
Sawan Ko Aane Do	Rajkamal	Kalyani Mitra	Sawan Ko Aane Do
Teri palkon ke tale yeh jo deepak jale	Ravindra Jain		Zid
Jamuna Kinare Baje Shyam Ki Bansuriya	Ravindra Jain		Shyam Tere Kitne Naam
Jogi Ji Dheere Dheere	Ravindra Jain	Ravindra Jain	Nadiya Ke Paar
