= Chatpati =

Chatpatee
- Promotional Poster
- Directed by: V. Ravindra
- Produced by: Deven Verma
- Starring: Smita Patil; Raj Kiran; Reema Lagoo; Sudhir Dalvi; Shreeram Lagoo; Preeti Ganguli; Mumtaz Shanti; Jayshree T.
- Music by: Basu-Manohari (Music); Yogesh (Lyrics)
- Release date: 7 January 1983
- Country: India
- Language: Hindi

Chatpatee (Hindi: चटपटी; English: Spiced) is a 1983 Bollywood film directed by V. Ravindra and produced by Deven Verma, the film stars Smita Patil and Raj Kiran in lead role. The film also has a huge supporting cast including Reema Lagoo, Sudhir Dalvi, Shreeram Lagoo, Mumtaz Shanti, Preeti Ganguli and Jayshree T.

== Plot ==
This is the story of a girl, her dreams and madness about a perfect groom.

== Cast ==
- Smita Patil As Chatpati
- Raj Kiran
- Reema Lagoo
- Shreeram Lagoo
- Sudhir Dalvi
- Master Bhagwan
- Raj Bharati
- Raj Kumar Kapoor
- Jayshree T.
- Mumtaz Shanti
- Preeti Ganguli
- Seema Deo
- Birbal
- Padma Khanna
- Viju Khote
- Romesh Sharma
- Inder Thakur

== Soundtrack ==
Music arranged, composed and directed by Basu Manohari. Music direction under the musical duo of Basu Manohari

#	Title	Singer(s)
1	"Aa Hamsafar Pyaar Ki Sej Par"	Lata Mangeshkar, Kishore Kumar
2	"Aa Hamsafar Pyaar Ki Sej Par, Kuchh Kahen Kuchh Sunen"	Lata Mangeshkar, Kishore Kumar
3	"Hai Raat Pyasi"	Asha Bhosle
4	"Holi Ke Din Aai Aai Re Holi"	Suresh Wadkar, Asha Bhosle
5	"Mai Hu Madam Chatpati"	Asha Bhosle
6	"Mai Ne Nahi Pee"	Asha Bhosle
7	"Naye Berukhi"	Asha Bhosle
