= Ghar Ki Laaj =

- Promotional Poster
- Directed by: B. R. Ishara
- Starring: Moushumi Chatterjee and Sanjeev Kumar
- Music by: Ravindra Jain
- Release date: 1979
- Country: India
- Language: Hindi

Ghar Ki Laaj is a 1979 Indian Hindi-language film directed by B. R. Ishara. It starred Moushumi Chatterjee and Sanjeev Kumar with lyrics and. music by Ravindra Jain.

== Cast ==
- Moushumi Chatterjee
- Sanjeev Kumar
- Bharat Bhushan
- Aruna Irani
- Sohrab Modi
- Deven Verma

== Music ==
1. "Aayi Hain Aayi Hain Phir Se Bahaaren" – Hemlata
2. "Chhoti Raani Doobi Rahe Saaj Singaar Mein" – Manna Dey
3. "Maiya Ke Bina Beta Jaise Panchhi Kate Par Ka" – Mahendra Kapoor
4. "Mandir Mandir Bhatkaye" – Mohammed Rafi
