= Ganga Sagar (film) =

- Directed by: Ashish Kumar (actor)
- Starring: ASHISH KUMAR
- Music by: Ravindra Jain
- Release date: 1978
- Country: India
- Language: Hindi

Ganga Sagar is a 1978 Bollywood film directed by Ashish Kumar (actor). The film stars Trilok Kapoor, Bela Bose, Bharat Bhushan, and Lalita Pawar.

== Soundtrack ==
- Vrat Yeh Karwa Chauth Ka (Akhand Aseem Atoot Rahe) – Hemlata, Chandrani Mukherjee
- Naag Devta Meri Vinti Suno Re – Hemlata
- Saare Tirath Baar Baar Gangasagar Ek Baar (Patit Paawani Ganga) – Ravindra Jain
- O Ganga Maiya Aayi Gagan Se Dharti Pe – Hemlata
- Jai Ho Jai Ho Ganga Ki Jai Ho – Hemlata
