= Sunayana (film) =

- Directed by: Hiren Nag
- Produced by: Tarachand Barjatya
- Starring: Naseeruddin Shah; Vijayendra Ghatge; Talluri Rameshwari
- Music by: Ravindra Jain
- Production company: Rajshri Pictures
- Release date: 1979
- Running time: 2 hours 11 min
- Country: India
- Language: Hindi

Sunayana is a 1979 Bollywood family drama film directed by Hiren Nag and produced by Tarachand Barjatya.

== Cast ==
- Talluri Rameshwari as Sunayana
- Vijayendra Ghatge as Dr. Indrajeet
- Naseeruddin Shah as Rajoo
- Gayatri
- Sulochana Latkar
- Jagdeep
- Pinchoo Kapoor
- Leela Mishra
- Mukri
- Rajendra Nath

== Soundtrack ==
Soundtrack for this film has been composed and written by Ravindra Jain.

1. "Sunayana" – K. J. Yesudas
2. "Aanso Bhi Hain"– K. J. Yesudas
3. "Megha O Re Megha" – Hemlata
4. "Kaisi Hoon Main" – Hemlata
