= Kabhi To Milenge =

- Genre: Television drama
- Written by: Bhooshan Banmali
- Directed by: Anant Mahadevan
- Starring: See below
- Country of origin: India
- Original language: Hindi
- No. of seasons: 1
- No. of episodes: Total 20

Production
- Editor: Saurav Verma
- Camera setup: Multi-camera
- Running time: Approx. 24 minutes

Original release
- Network: Zee TV
- Release: 2 July – 27 July 2001

Kabhi To Milenge is an Indian television series that aired on Zee TV based on the story of a woman who has been wrongly convicted for the murder of her husband. The series premiered on 2 July 2001 and ended on 27 July 2001. They aired every Monday to Friday at 10 pm IST. It starred known Bollywood film actress Rati Agnihotri in the main lead and was directed by known Bollywood film director Anant Mahadevan, who also worked in the series.

== Cast ==
- Rati Agnihotri
- Tanaaz Currim
- Tom Alter
- Vijayendra Ghatge
- Anant Mahadevan as Dr. Praful
- Sadhana Singh
- Sumeet Saigal
- Shiva Rindani
- Anang Desai
- Renuka Israni
- Suhas Khandke
- Hussain Kuwajerwala
- Bakul Thakkar
- Sonam Malhotra
- Rakesh Pandey
- Suva Joshi
- Vaidehi
- Vijay Gokhale
- Hemant Choudhary as Investigating officer
- Paramveer
