= Chitchor =

1976 film directed by Basu Chatterjee

- Theatrical poster
- Directed by: Basu Chatterjee
- Screenplay by: Basu Chatterjee
- Based on: Chittachakor by Subodh Ghosh
- Produced by: Tarachand Barjatya
- Starring: Amol Palekar; Zarina Wahab
- Cinematography: K. K. Mahajan
- Edited by: Mukhtar Ahmed
- Music by: Ravindra Jain
- Production company: Rajshri Productions
- Release date: 30 January 1976
- Country: India
- Language: Hindi

Chitchor (transl. Heart Stealer) is a 1976 Indian Hindi-language romantic musical film, written and directed by Basu Chatterjee. The film is a Rajshri Productions film produced by Tarachand Barjatya. It is based on a Bengali story, Chittachakor by Subodh Ghosh. K. J. Yesudas and Master Raju won the National Film Awards 1976 for Best Male Playback Singer and Best Child Artist respectively. The film was remade in Telugu as Ammayi Manasu, in Malayalam as Minda Poochakku Kalyanam and in Tamil as Ullam Kavarntha Kalvan. It was also an inspiration for the 1997 Bengali film Sedin Chaitramas and the 2003 film Main Prem Ki Diwani Hoon.

== Plot ==
Pitamber Chaudhri, headmaster of a school in Madhupur, India, has a daughter named Geeta. Geeta is a typical village belle — naive, childish, and always in the company of a little boy who is her neighbour.

Pitamber's older daughter, Meera, who lives in Mumbai, informs Pitamber of the arrival of a young engineer who could be a possible match for Geeta. Pitamber is asked to welcome him and treat him well. Without further question, Pitamber and family do just that when the visitor arrives by train.

Vinod, the newcomer, takes an instant liking to the family and to Geeta in particular, even teaching her to sing. The family begins to talk about the possibility of Vinod and Geeta marrying. Life is good until another letter from Meera arrives. Pitamber is shocked to read that the engineer whom Meera was sending to meet the family has not yet arrived but will be coming soon. Vinod is an overseer who happened to come early, as his boss Sunil was delayed and could not make it as planned.

The family is disappointed. They ask Geeta to stop seeing Vinod and turn her attention to Sunil, the engineer, but Geeta cannot forget Vinod. Sunil is fond of Geeta and agrees to the engagement, which is quickly arranged. When Vinod hears of the engagement, he prepares to leave the village before the ceremony. Upon hearing this, Geeta insists that she will marry Vinod, against the wishes of her family. She rushes to the train station but not before the train leaves. Disheartened, she turns back and is received and driven back to her house by Sunil. To her surprise, Vinod is at the house. All misconceptions have been cleared up: Geeta and Vinod are to be engaged.

== Cast ==
- Amol Palekar as Vinod
- Zarina Wahab as Geeta P. Choudhry
- Vijayendra Ghatge as Sunil Kishan
- A. K. Hangal as Pitamber Choudhry, Geeta's father
- Dina Pathak as Mrs. P. Choudhry, Geeta's mother
- Ritu Kamal as Meera, Geeta's sister
- Master Raju as Deepak Kumar Agnihotri 'Deepu'
- Shail Chaturvedi as Chaubey
- C. S. Dubey as Postman
- Amit Narvekar as cart driver

== Production ==
The principal shooting of film was spread over 25 days at neighbouring hill stations of Panchgani and Mahabaleshwar in Maharashtra. A few scenes were also shot in Kihim village near Alibag. A bungalow in Panchgani was the setting on Zarina Wahab's home, where many keys scenes, including the songs, like Gori tera gaon bada pyaara were shot.

== Music ==
The track "Gori Tera Gaon", which earned K J Yesudas national award for the Best Male Playback Singer in 1976, is set in raga Palasi. David Courtney calls Palasi the "best fit", noting that the song's tonic is ambiguous and that other musicians classify it differently. This soundtrack album also marked his debut in Bollywood Music.

All lyrics are written by Ravindra Jain; all music is composed by Ravindra Jain.

No.	Title	Singer(s)	Length
1.	"Aaj Se Pehle Aaj Se Zyada"	K. J. Yesudas	05:07
2.	"Jab Deep Jale Aana, Jab Shaam Dhale Aana" (Raga Yaman Kalyan)	K. J. Yesudas, Hemlata	05:35
3.	"Gori Tera Gaon Bada Pyara" (Raga Palasi)	K. J. Yesudas	05:11
4.	"Tu Jo Mere Sur Me, Sur Milale" (Raga Pilu)	K. J. Yesudas, Hemlata	04:57

== Reception ==
The film became a box office hit

=== Awards ===
Year	Category	Cast/Crew member	Status	Notes
National Film Award
1976	Best Male Playback Singer	K. J. Yesudas	Won	for "Gori Tera Gaon Bada Pyara"
1976	Best Child Artist	Raju Shrestha	Won	
Filmfare Award
1977	Best Female Playback Singer	Hemlata	Won	for "Tu Jo Mere Sur Me, Sur Milale"
1977	Best Film	Tarachand Barjatya (Rajshri Productions)	Nominated	
1977	Best Director	Basu Chatterjee	Nominated	
1977	Best Male Playback Singer	K. J. Yesudas	Nominated	for "Gori Tera Gaon Bada Pyara"

== Remakes ==
The 2003 Hindi movie Main Prem Ki Diwani Hoon starring Hrithik Roshan, Kareena Kapoor and Abhishek Bachchan had a similar storyline. The core plot of the movie was an inspiration for the 1990 Kannada movie Panchama Veda starring Ramesh Aravind and Sudha Rani which went on to be remade in Telugu in 1997 as Rukmini. Another uncredited remake was Minda Poochakku Kalyanam which released in 1990 in Malayalam starring Suresh Gopi, Lizi Priyadarshan and Mukesh. The movie was unofficially adapted in Telugu as Ammayi Manasu which starred Jayasudha, Chandra Mohan, Kanta Rao. A Bengali remake by the name Sedin Choitro Mas was made by director Prabhat Roy. The 1997 Hindi movie Pardes by Subhash Ghai, starring Shahrukh Khan & Mahima Chaudhry was loosely based on this movie. In 1987, it also has had an uncredited remake in Tamil as Ullam Kavarntha Kalvan starring Pandiyarajan and Rekha.
