= Har Har Gange =

- Directed by: Babubhai Mistri
- Starring: See below
- Music by: Ravindra Jain
- Release date: 1979
- Country: India
- Language: Hindi

Har Har Gange is a 1979 Bollywood film directed by Babubhai Mistri. It stars Neera, Ashish Kumar, Anjana Mumtaz in the lead roles. The music is composed by Ravindra Jain and the lyrics are penned by Bharat Vyas. It is a color remake of the 1968 black and white movie sharing the same title and the story. The movie is an adaptation of Skanda Purana.

== Plot ==
Distraught after the death of his wife Sati (incarnation of Adishakti), Shiva isolates himself and becomes immersed in deep meditation. To restore order, Adishakti takes birth as Ganga and Uma. Uma undertakes arduous austerities to break Shiva's penance to beget the prophesied child to slay Taraka, while Ganga is brought to heaven where she becomes a celestial river coursing the heavens, purifying anything she touches.

== Cast ==
- Neera ... Ganga
- Ashish Kumar (actor) ... Bhagwan Shiv
- Anjana Mumtaz ... Sati / Parvati
- Vikram Gokhale ... Bhagirath
- Jayshree Gadkar ... Bhagirath's wife
- Jeevan ... Narad Muni
- Mohan Choti... Himalaya Raj
- Uma Dhawan... Menaka
- Sudarshan Dhir ... Kamdev
- Padma Khanna ... Rambha
- Raj Kumar ... Indra
- Sujata ... Dancing decoy
- Jayshree T. ... Rati
- B.M. Vyas ... Paap

== Soundtrack ==
The music was composed by Ravindra Jain and lyrics, for all songs, written by Bharat Vyas.

- "Amrut Sa Tera Paani" (version 1) – Mahendra Kapoor
- "Amrut Sa Tera Paani" (version 2) – Mahendra Kapoor
- "Mai Janm Janm Se Karu Tapasya" (part 1) – Asha Bhosle
- "Pyasi Dharti Tujhe Pukare" – Manna Dey
- "Navdurga Navroop Maiyya" – Hemlata
- "Tum Ho Madhu Pyase Bhanware" – Asha Bhosle
- "Main Janam Janam Se Karu Tapasya" (part 2) – Asha Bhosle
- "Main Rambha Roop Ki Raani" – Asha Bhosle, Hemlata
