= Jaana Pehchana =

- Directed by: Sachin Pilgaonkar
- Written by: Neelam Jha (dialogues)
- Screenplay by: Sachin Pilgaonkar
- Story by: Pratibha Mishra
- Produced by: Ajit Kumar Barjatya; Kamal Kumar Barjatya; Rajkumar Barjatya
- Starring: Sachin Pilgaonkar; Ranjeeta Kaur
- Cinematography: Rahul Jadhav
- Music by: Ravindra Jain
- Production company: Rajshri Productions
- Distributed by: Rajshri Productions
- Release date: 16 September 2011 (India)
- Country: India
- Language: Hindi

Jaana Pehchana (English: Well-known), is a 2011 Indian film directed by Sachin Pilgaonkar and produced by Rajshri Productions. The film stars Sachin Pilgaonkar and Ranjeeta in leads. It is a sequel to the 1978 film Ankhiyon Ke Jharokhon Se. The lyrics and music are by Ravindra Jain.

== Plot ==
Arun lives a wealthy, yet depressed lifestyle due to death of his love Lily. (Note: As established in Ankhiyon Ke Jharokhon Se (1978)) After 33 years, Arun is now running a cancer hospital in Lily's name. Things turn upside down when Arun meets Lily's lookalike Asha. After observing Arun's loneliness, she decides to write Arun's biography and wants to get published. Arun starts falling in love with Asha after the narration of his story. But Arun was not ready to marry Asha as he didn't want anyone in his life except Lily. But one night Arun wakes up from his sleep and sees Lily's soul in front of him, who then convinces Arun to marry Asha. The next day, Asha's book, which she wrote on Arun's life was published with the name "Ankhiyon ke Jharoko se". There Arun proposes Asha for marriage which she accepts happily. The film ends with Arun and Asha walking together and lived a happy life thereafter.

== Cast ==
- Sachin Pilgaonkar as Arun Prakash Mathur
- Ranjeeta Kaur as Asha/Lily Fernandes
- Jr. Mehmood as Madan Agarwal

== Critical reception ==
The film gained mostly negative reviews. Gaurav Malani from Times of India stated that the film has most scenes from the prequel and nothing more than in sequel. Preeti Arora from Rediff, rated the film 2 out of 5, stated that film is new, but the content is old. Mayank Shekhar of Hindustan Times gave the film 1 star out of 5, stating that film has unusual content. Komal Nahta gave the film 1 star out of 5, writing "On the whole, Jaana Pehchana is a well-made and well-enacted film but its commercial prospects seem bleak. Since the film has opened in just one cinema in the whole of India, lack of promotion will also prove to be a deterrent because mouth publicity would have to be super-strong for the film to make its mark at the box-office."

== Soundtrack ==
Jaana Pehchaana

Soundtrack album by Ravindra Jain
- Released: 16 August 2011 (Film)
- Recorded: 2011
- Studio: Rajshri
- Genre: Feature Film soundtrack
- Length: 24:12
- Label: Sangeet Music
- Producer: Ravindra Jain

1. " Ek Farishta Mil Gaya Hai" - Kavita Seth
2. "Hai Ranj Ka Saamaan" - Sadhana Sargam
3. "Hairat Zada Hoon Main" - Sachin Pilgaonkar
4. "Jaisi Bhi Hai Yeh Zindagi" - Sadhana Sargam
5. "Jis Mod Pe Jis Haal Mein" - Sachin Pilgaonkar
6. "Zindagi Mein Kahin Na Kahin" - Javed Ali
