= Ankhiyon Ke Jharokhon Se =

1978 Indian drama film

- Directed by: Hiren Nag
- Written by: Vrajendra Gaur
- Screenplay by: Hiren Nag, Madhusudan Kalelkar
- Story by: Madhusudan Kalelkar
- Produced by: Tarachand Barjatya
- Starring: Ranjeeta Kaur; Sachin; Madan Puri; Iftekhar; Urmila Bhatt; Harindranath Chattopadhyay
- Cinematography: Anil Mitra
- Music by: Ravindra Jain
- Production company: Rajshri Productions
- Distributed by: Rajshri Productions
- Release date: 7 April 1978
- Running time: 135 minutes
- Country: India
- Language: Hindi

Ankhiyon Ke Jharokhon Se is a 1978 Indian Hindi-language drama film, starring Ranjeeta and Sachin and directed by Hiren Nag. It was produced and distributed by Rajshri Productions and showcased music by Ravindra Jain. The film takes influence from the 1970 novel Love Story by Erich Segal.

A sequel, Jaana Pehchana, was released in 2011.

== Plot ==
Arun, the son of a barrister and the self-proclaimed "prince" of the male students, experiences a blow to his pride and enormous ego when he places second in the Terminal Examination. Lily Fernandes, the modest daughter of a nurse in a private nursing home, outperforms him. Taking this as a defeat, Arun nurses a personal vendetta to crush Lily's growing popularity in school. Despite Arun's attempts to undermine her, Lily tolerates his and his friends' remarks and sarcasm, bearing no grudge against him.

Over time, they gradually discover each other's basic qualities and become admirers. They spend weekends visiting beautiful places together to deepen their understanding. Lily's mother is the first to notice the love blossoming between her daughter and Arun. Despite Arun being deeply in love with Lily, concerns arise due to their differing social statuses. Despite these worries, Arun's father approves and proposes to Lily's mother, suggesting that their children be allowed to marry.

When everything is going well, Lily falls ill and is discovered to have leukemia. Even though Lily and Arun act as if nothing was wrong, everyone tries to save her. Everything seems fine for a while, but Lily's condition worsens. She eventually dies in Arun's arms, leaving him devastated. Arun attends the same college they studied at and mourns for Lily. The film concludes with Arun by the seaside, promising Lily that he will never forget her. He acknowledges that she was an inspiration in his life and will always remain so.

== Cast ==
- Sachin Pilgaonkar as Arun Prakash Mathur
- Ranjeeta Kaur as Lily Fernandes
- Madan Puri as Arun's father
- Iftekhar as Dr. Pradhan
- Urmila Bhatt as Ruby Fernandes
- Harindranath Chattopadhyay as Mr. Rodrigues
- Master Raju

== Soundtrack ==
Ravindra Jain composed the music and wrote the songs.

"Ankhiyon Ke Jharokhon Se"

Song by Hemlata

from the album Ankhiyon Ke Jharokhon Se
- Released: 7 April 1978
- Recorded: 1978
- Studio: Saregama
- Venue: India
- Genre: Soundtrack
- Length: 6:45
- Composer: Ravindra Jain
- Lyricist: Ravindra Jain
- Producer: Tarachand Barjatya

Music video
- "Ankhiyon Ke Jharokhon Se" Ankhiyon Ke Jharokhon Se on YouTube

Track No	Song	Singer(s)
1	"Ankhiyon Ke Jharokhon Se"	Hemlata
2	"Jaate Huye Yeh Pal Chin"	Ravindra Jain
3	"Ek Din Tum Bahut Bare Banoge"	Hemlata, Shailendra Singh
4	"Kai Din Se Mujhe"	Hemlata, Shailendra Singh
5	"Dohavali/Bade Badai Na Kare"	Hemlata, Jaspal Singh

== Awards ==
26th Filmfare Awards:

Nominated

- Best Film – Rajshri Productions
- Best Actress – Ranjeeta Kaur
- Best Music Director – Ravindra Jain
- Best Lyricist – Ravindra Jain for "Ankhiyon Ke Jharokhon Se"
- Best Female Playback Singer – Hemlata for "Ankhiyon Ke Jharokhon Se"

== Sequel ==
In 2011 Rajshri Productions produced a sequel for Ankhiyon Ke Jharokhon Se featuring Sachin Pilgaonkar and Ranjeeta Kaur of the original cast. The sequel was called Jaana Pehchana and showcased Arun's life after Lily's death. Ranjeeta Kaur portrayed a new character who is a look-alike of Lily. The film was released on 16 September 2011.
