= Paap Ko Jalaa Kar Raakh Kar Doonga =

Paap Ko Jalaakar Raakh Kar Doonga
- Poster
- Directed by: K.R. Reddy
- Written by: K. K. Singh (dialogues)
- Story by: Beesetty Lakshman Rao
- Produced by: Ram Babu
- Starring: Dharmendra; Govinda; Anita Raj; Farah
- Cinematography: Haranath Reddy
- Edited by: Murali-Ramaiah
- Music by: Ravindra Jain
- Production company: Sri Haripriya Cine Creations
- Release date: 24 September 1988
- Country: India
- Language: Hindi

Paap Ko Jalaakar Raakh Kar Doonga (transl. I will burn the sins into ashes) is a 1988 Hindi suspense film. Directed by K. R. Reddy, the film stars Dharmendra, Govinda, Anita Raj, and Farah in lead roles.

== Plot ==
Shankar Saxena lives with his elder brother, Chief Engineer Vinay, his wife Kavita, and their daughter of marriageable age, Pooja. Shankar is an undercover CBI Officer, a fact that was hidden from the rest of the family, until only recently. Vinay would like Pooja to marry Deepak Malhotra, who works in his office, and is quite unaware that Deepak and Pooja have already met and are very much in love. Although Deepak comes from a poor family, and lives with his widowed and blind mother, Vinay does not foresee this as a problem. Then suddenly things change dramatically when Vinay suspects Deepak of accepting bribes from a corrupt builder named Shaadilal, fires Deepak, pending a police investigation. And to make matters worse, Shankar too is aware of Deepak — not as a groom for his niece, but as a suspect for murder! But before he could arrest Deepak, he must execute a warrant for the arrest of none other than Vinay himself. Watch as events unfold enveloping this family in a web of deceit, intrigue, distrust, and terror.

== Cast ==
- Dharmendra as Shankar Saxena
- Govinda as Deepak Malhotra
- Anita Raj as Vandana
- Farah as Pooja
- Tanuja as Kavita Saxena
- Kulbhushan Kharbanda as Vinay Saxena
- Iftekhar as Inspector General of Police
- Gita Siddharth as Mrs. Malhotra
- Viju Khote as Doctor
- Sadashiv Amrapurkar as Premanand
- Shakti Kapoor as Shaadilal
- Anupam Kher as Bhuchaal
- Tej Sapru as Tejendra
- Manik Irani as Raka

== Music ==
Song	Singer
"Jeevan Sukh Dukh Ka Ek Sangam Hai"	Kishore Kumar, Anuradha Paudwal
"Hum Jise Ab Tak Bhool Na Paaye"	Kishore Kumar, Anuradha Paudwal
"Aag Jo Tere Tan Ko"	Kishore Kumar
"Waqt Bigade Waqt Banaye"	Kishore Kumar
"Jeevan Sukh Dukh Ka Ek Sangam Hai" (Sad)	Kishore Kumar
"Kya Tareef Karoon Iski, Yeh Kaisi Hai"	Suresh Wadkar, Anuradha Paudwal
"Saathiya O Saathiya, Dilruba O Dilruba"	Mohammed Aziz, Anuradha Paudwal
"Rani Kahe Ki Gudiya Kahe, Asha Kahe Ke Sapna Kahe"	Mohammed Aziz, Anuradha Paudwal
