= Gopal Krishna (1979 film) =

- Directed by: Vijay Sharma
- Written by: Vijay Sharma
- Screenplay by: Vijay Sharma
- Story by: Vijay Sharma
- Based on: Bhagavata Purana
- Produced by: Tarachand Barjatya
- Starring: Sachin; Zarina Wahab
- Cinematography: Babu Bhai
- Edited by: Mukhtar Ahmad
- Music by: Ravindra Jain
- Production company: Rajshri Productions
- Release date: 1979
- Running time: 129 minutes
- Country: India
- Language: Hindi

Gopal Krishna is a 1979 Hindi fantasy film produced by Tarachand Barjatya and directed by Vijay Sharma. Based on the Bhagavata Purana, it tells the story of the Hindu deity Krishna from his birth until the slaying of his demon uncle Kamsa. The film stars Sachin Pilgaonkar and Zarina Wahab in the lead roles.

== Cast ==
- Sachin as Krishna – Adult
- Zarina Wahab as Radha
- Satyajeet as Balraam
- Manher Desai as Maharaj Kans
- Master Sandeep as Krishna – Child
- Rita Bhaduri as Yashoda
- Jeevan as Narad Muni
- Mahipal as Bhagwan Vishnu
- Paintal as Friend of Krishna
- Surender Sharma as Nanda–Krishna's Foster Father

== Soundtrack ==
All songs and lyrics were composed by music director Ravindra Jain.

- Teri Maya Ka Na Paya Koi Par (Ravindra Jain)
- Tu Man Ki Ati Bhori (Chandrani Mukharji)
- Neer Bharan Ka Karke Bahana (Yasudas & Hemlata)
- Koi Mat Jariyo Ri Mere Bhag (Hemlata)
- Govinda Gopala (Hemlata)
- Aayo Fagun Hathilo (Jaspal Singh & Hemlata)
