= Hemlata =

- Gender: Female
- Language: Hindi

Origin
- Origin: Indian
- Meaning: "Golden creeper"
- Region of origin: India

Hemlata is a feminine given name. Notable persons with the name include:

- Hemlata (singer) (born 1954), Bollywood singer
- Hemlata Talesra (born 1944), Indian educationalist
- Hemlata Kala (born 1975), Indian cricketer
- Hemlata Negi, Indian politician
- Hemlata Gupta, Indian doctor
- Hemlata Chaudhary, Indian politician
- Hemlata Divakar, Indian politician
