= Chadi Jawani Budhe Nu =

- Directed by: A. Salam
- Produced by: F.C. Mehra
- Starring: B.S. Sood, Kimti Anand, Rajendranath, Vasundhara, Katy Mirza.
- Music by: Ravindra Jain
- Release date: 1976
- Country: India
- Language: Punjabi

Chadi Jawani Budhe Nu is an Indian Punjabi language film released in 1976.

== Plot ==
A small-time businessman (B.S. Sood) reaches the "naughty forties". His wife is not good enough for him anymore, so he decides he needs a modern up-to-date mistress, resulting in hilarious situations.

== Cast ==
- B.S. Sood
- Kimti Anand
- Rajendranath
- Vasundhara
- Katy Mirza

== Home media ==
The film was available on Netflix until August 2022.
