= Ravindra Jain =

Indian composer, lyricist and playback singer

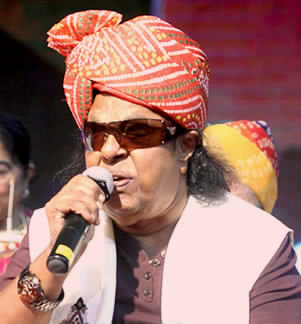
- Jain at the Rajasthan Cinema Awards in 2015
- Born: 28 February 1944; Aligarh, United Provinces, British India
- Died: 9 October 2015 (aged 71); Mumbai, Maharashtra, India
- Occupations: Music composer; lyricist; playback singer
- Years active: 1972–2015
- Spouse: Divya Jain
- Children: 1

Ravindra Jain (28 February 1944 – 9 October 2015) was an Indian music composer, lyricist and playback singer. He started his career in the early 1970s by composing for several hit movies, and continued despite his struggle with blindness. His notable works include Chor Machaye Shor (1974), Geet Gaata Chal (1975), Chitchor (1976) and Ankhiyon Ke Jharokhon Se (1978), Nadiya Ke Paar (1982), Ram Teri Ganga Maili (1985) and Vivah (2006). He composed music for many films and TV shows including Ramanand Sagar's epic Ramayan (1987), which became iconic. He was awarded the Padma Shri, the fourth-highest civilian award of the Republic of India in 2015 for his contribution to arts.

== Early life and education ==
Ravindra Jain was born blind on 28 February 1944 in Aligarh to Pandit Indramani Jain and Kiran Jain as the third child of seven brothers and one sister. He belongs to the Jain community. His father was a Sanskrit pandit and his mother was a homemaker.

His father recognised his talent and sent him to stalwarts like G.L. Jain, Janardhan Sharma and Nathu Ram for formal education in music. At a young age, he started singing bhajans at temples.

== Career ==
His works include Saudagar, Chor Machaye Shor, Chitchor, Geet Gaata Chal, Fakira, Ankhiyon Ke Jharokhon Se, Dulhan Wahi Jo Piya Man Bhaye, Paheli, Do Jasoos, Pati Patni Aur Woh, Insaf Ka Tarazu, Nadiya Ke Paar, Ram Teri Ganga Maili and Henna. He extensively used Yesudas and Hemlata for singing his songs. He composed many religious albums in different Indian languages, including Bengali and Malayalam. He composed music for several television series. His music for Ramanand Sagar's Ramayana became iconic.

Some of his most popular works on TV are Shri Krishna, Alif Laila, Jai Ganga Maiya, Jai Mahalaxmi, Shree Brahma Vishnu Mahesh, Sai Baba, Jai Maa Durga, Jai Hanuman, Sankat Mochan Hanuman and Maha Kavya Mahabharat.

== Personal life ==
Jain was married to Divya Jain, with whom he has a son Aayushmaan. He died in Mumbai on 9 October 2015 because of multiple organ failure.

== Discography ==
=== Films ===
| Year | Film | Notes |
|---|---|---|
| 1972 | Kanch aur Heera | |
| 1973 | Saudagar | |
| 1973 | Haathi Ke Daant | |
| 1974 | Chor Machaye Shor | |
| 1975 | Geet Gaata Chal | |
| 1975 | Do Jasoos | |
| 1976 | Chitchor | |
| 1976 | Fakira | |
| 1976 | Chadi Jawani Budhe Nu | Punjabi film |
| 1976 | Deewaangee | |
| 1976 | Tapasya | |
| 1976 | Zid | |
| 1977 | Sujatha | Malayalam film |
| 1977 | Dulhan Wahi Jo Piya Man Bhaye | |
| 1977 | Paheli | |
| 1977 | Daku Aur Mahatma | |
| 1977 | Ram Bharose | |
| 1977 | Kotwal Saab | |
| 1977 | Maha Badmaash | |
| 1978 | Ankhiyon Ke Jharokhon Se | |
| 1978 | Mera Rakshak | |
| 1978 | Pati Patni Aur Woh | |
| 1979 | Aatish | |
| 1979 | Gopal Krishna | |
| 1979 | Har Har Gange | |
| 1979 | Aakhri Kasam | |
| 1979 | Ghar Ki Laaj | |
| 1979 | Raadha Aur Seeta | |
| 1979 | Sunayana | |
| 1980 | Khwab | |
| 1980 | Insaf Ka Tarazu | |
| 1981 | Kahani Ek Chor Ki Braj Bhoomi | |
| 1982 | Nadiya Ke Paar | |
| 1982 | Ayaash | |
| 1984 | Abodh Harishchandra Shaibya Mr. X | Bengali |
| 1985 | Ram Teri Ganga Maili | |
| 1987 | Pratighaat | |
| 1987 | Marte Dam Tak | |
| 1988 | Paap Ko Jalaa Kar Raakh Kar Doonga | |
| 1990 | Kaarnama | |
| 1990 | Sukham Sukhakaram | Malayalam |
| 1991 | Brahmarshi Vishwamitra | Telugu |
| 1991 | Yeh Aag Kab Bujhegi | |
| 1991 | Henna | |
| 1993 | Meri Aan | |
| 1994 | Beta Ho To Aisa | |
| 2006 | Vivah | Also lyrics |
| 2008 | Ek Vivaah... Aisa Bhi | |
| 2011 | Jaana Pehchana | |
| 2014 | Kahin Hai Mera Pyar | |

=== Television ===
- Ramayana (1987)
- Shri Krishna (1993)
- Alif Laila (1993)
- Jai Veer Hanuman (1995)
- Jai Hanuman (1997)
- Sai Baba (2005)
- Sankat Mochan Hanumaan (2012)
- Jai Ganga Maiya
- Jai Mahalaxmi
- Shree Brahma Vishnu Mahesh
- Jai Maa Durga
- Maha Kavya Mahabharat
- Ramayana (2008)

== Awards ==
He was awarded the Padma Shri, the fourth-highest civilian award of the Republic of India in 2015 for his contribution to arts. He received the Filmfare Best Music Director award for his work in Ram Teri Ganga Maili in 1985. Ravindra Jain won many other awards for his contribution to Indian music.

== Legacy ==
His funeral was attended by numerous celebrities including Hema Malini, Ranjit and Sooraj Barjatya. Prime minister Modi said: "He will be remembered for his versatile music and fighting spirit."
