= Chandrani Mukherjee =

Indian singer

- Born: West Bengal, India
- Origin: India
- Genres: Filmi, Bollywood
- Occupation: Playback singer
- Instrument: Vocals
- Years active: 1975–1993

Chandrani Mukherjee is a former Bollywood playback singer, she is a sister-in-law of late Bappi Lahiri from West Bengal and a Filmfare nominee.

== Career ==
Chandrani began her career in Bollywood with the film Aag Aur Toofan in 1975. Thereafter she sang in a couple of films until her swan song in Aaj Kie Aurat (1993). She was nominated for the Filmfare Best Female Playback Award thrice though she never won it.

== Notable songs ==
1. Paisa Do Paisa [Album: Hamaara Sansaar];
2. Aankhon Se Girana Na [Album: Suhaagan];
3. Solah Shukrawar Bidhi Anusar - 2 [Album: Solah Shukrawar];
4. Yeh Kaisa Suraj Hai [Album: Solah Shukrawar];
5. Mil Jaye Jo Tu [Album: Yeh Preet Na Hogi Kam];
6. Dil Mila Le O Abdulla [Album: Jaan-E-Bahaar];
7. Jai Jai Ho Teri Jai Jai Ho Maa [Album: Hare Krishna];
8. Chori Chori Kahan Chala [Album: Nain Mile Chain Kahan];
9. O Re Sajanwa.... [Album: Pyasi Nadi]
10. Bahut Kala Savera Hai [Album: Faqeer Badshah];
11. Bapuji Bapuji [Album: Kasam];
12. Dil Toot Gaya Hai Apna [Album: Anokha Insaan];
13. Shankar Bhole-Bhale [Album: Shiv Shakti];
14. Pehchan To Thi Pehchana Nahin [Album: [Griha Pravesh];
15. Jai Jagdambe Mata [Album: Bharat Ki Santan];
16. Mummy Daddy Ka Pyar [Album: Kanoon Meri Mutthi Mein];
17. Nain Teri Jyoti [Album: Dushmano Ka Dushman]
18. Bhoola Dete Agar [Album: Bandhan Pheron Ke];
19. How Are You Munni Bai [Album: Laalach]
20. Jhoothe Ber Khane Shabri [Album: Poster];
21. Uthe Huonko Zamaane Mein Sab Uthaate Hain [Meri Izzat Bachao];
22. Ujad Gaya Ghar Ek Nirdhan Ka [Meri Izzat Bachao];
23. Tu Man Ki Ati Bhori O Maiya Mori Tu Man [Gopal Krishna];
24. Sun Sun Sun O Mere Manmeet Ho [Atyachar];
25. Pyaar Ki Pyaasi Zulm Ki Maari [Main Khilona Nahin];
26. Nazar Aati Nahin Manzil Tadapne Se Bhi Kya Haasil [Kaanch Aur Heera];
27. Na Samjha Hai Koi Na Samjhega Yaaron [Yeh Kaisa Nasha Hai];
28. Mere Mehboob Shaayad Aaj Kuchh Naaraaz Hain Mujhse [Kitne Paas Kitne Door];
29. Main Aankhen Moond Ke So Jaaoon [Kamana]
30. Lutate Dekho Na Are Dekhnewaalo Mujhko [Bistar];
31. Logon Ka Kya Hai Woh Yoohi Jalenge [Yeh Kaisa Nasha Hai];
32. Kaleja Thaam Ke Kar Rahe [Main Khilona Nahin];
33. Kaise Bataaun Main Tujhko Achchha Lage Piya Mujhko Tera Saath [Yeh Kaisa Nasha Hai];
34. Jisne Bachaayi Meri Laaj [Jai Baba Amarnath];
35. Jehi Vidhi Raakhe Raam Tohi Vidhi Rahiye [Shiksha];
36. Jaan Le Pe Jab Tu Aamaad Ho Gaya, "Is Ishq Mohabbat Ki" [Zulm Ki Pukar];
37. Hain Vaadiyaan Dilnashi Har Tamanna Hai Jawaan [Dimple];
38. Geet Hai Yeh Zindagi Gun Gunaate Aur Gaate Chale Chalo [Jivan Rekha];
39. Ganga Jee Ki Lahron Pe Diyaara Bahe [Payal Ki Zankar];
40. Dil Aaj Bahut Khush Hai Dildaar Tujhe Pa Ke [Aag Aur Toofan];
41. Dekho Sar Pe Hain Do Shing [HumKadam];
42. Chaahnewaala Jise Tere Jaisa Mila Jaaye Meri Jaan Kehke Loge [Pyasi Nadi];
43. Bhar De Ae Mere Maula Jholi Hai Khaali [Meri Izzat Bachao];
44. Aap Agar Aap Na Hote To Bhala Kya Hote [Griha Pravesh];
45. Koi bhi dil main naa aaya tha [Laparwah]
46. Aankhon Mein Hain Aansooon Hothon Par Hansi [Tere Pyar Mein]; and,
47. Aaja Ki Teri Raah Mein Palke Bichha Ke Ham [Lalach]
48. Is Ishq Mohabbat Ki with Mohammad Rafi (Zulm Ki Pukaar, 1979)
49. Dunia Da Dastoor (With Savita Sathi), Batwata,1982 (Punjabi)
50. Bankhand Ki Koyal (Rajasthani Music Album) (With Dilraj Kaur & Sudha Malhotra),1982

== Award and nominations ==
Year	Nominee / work	Award	Result
1981	"Pehchan To Thi" (Griha Pravesh)	Filmfare Award for Best Female Playback Singer.	Nominated
1982	"Mohabbat Rang Layegi" (Poonam)	Filmfare Award for Best Female Playback Singer.	Nominated
1984	"Aaja Ki Teri Raahon Mein" (Lal Chunariya)	Filmfare Award for Best Female Playback Singer.	Nominated
