= Kavita Barjatya =

Indian film producer

Kavita K. Barjatya
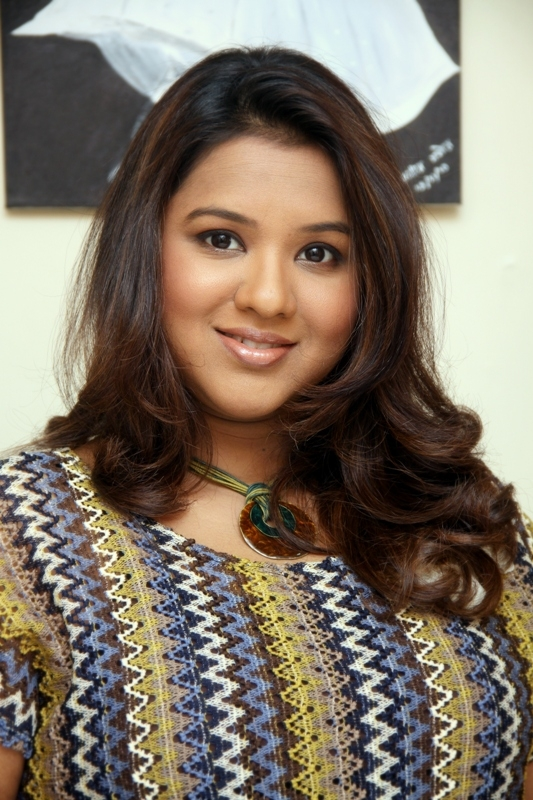
- Born: 12 November 1977 (age 48); Mumbai, Maharashtra, India
- Occupations: Producer, director of Rajshri Productions
- Years active: 2003–present
- Father: Kamal Kumar Barjatya
- Relatives: Tarachand Barjatya (grandfather); Sooraj Barjatya (cousin)

Kavita K. Barjatya (born 12 November 1977) is an Indian television and film producer who works with Rajshri Productions, a film company owned by her parental family.

== Background and personal life ==
Barjatya was born on 12 November 1977 in Mumbai. She is the daughter of Kamal Kumar Barjatya, the present managing director of Rajshri Productions, and the granddaughter of film producer Tarachand Barjatya, who founded Rajshri Productions in 1947.

Barjatya went to school in Mumbai. She graduated with a distinction from Sydenham College and then earned a postgraduate degree in management from NMIMS University. She is a trained vocal singer and Kathak dancer and has delivered several live stage performances; she plays various musical instruments too.

She had a brief marriage that lasted for about 100 days. This was the turning point in her life and since then she has been focused on building her career.

== Career ==
Her career in the entertainment industry in India commenced with Main Prem Ki Diwani Hoon, where she assisted her cousin, Sooraj R. Barjatya.

In 2004, at the behest of Sooraj Barjatya, and with his guidance, she revived the television business which Rajshri had exited in 1984. Rajshri's TV division was launched that year, and Kavita, with other members of the family, successfully managed it for over eight years, producing shows like Woh Rehne Waali Mehlon Ki, Yahaaan Main Ghar Ghar Kheli, Do Hanson Ka Jodaa and more.

In 2013, Barjatya announced her foray into film making; her debut as producer was Samrat & Co., which was a Hindi detective thriller film released on 1 May 2014.

Her first independent project was the TV soap Woh Rehne Waali Mehlon Ki, a family saga, launched on Sahara One on 30 May 2005 in the 9.00 pm IST slot. The show had a successful run for six years and 1400 episodes and won many awards as well. Kavita's next production, Pyaar Ke Do Naam: Ek Raadha, Ek Shyaam, was launched on 3 April 2006 on Star Plus in the 8:00 pm IST slot. The story focuses on the concept of reincarnation and how everlasting love lasts. In January 2008, she launched Main Teri Parchhain Hoon on NDTV Imagine; the show enjoyed a successful year's run of 212 episodes. Another show, Yahaaan Main Ghar Ghar Kheli was launched on Zee TV in the 8:30 pm IST slot in November 2009. The set of Swarn Bhawan was the largest and most lavish of its time. It had a glorious 3-year run and completed nearly 700 episodes. Next came Do Hanson Ka Jodaa on NDTV Imagine in the 9.30 pm IST slot. In 2012, Kavita Barjatya launched two shows – Jhilmil Sitaaron Ka Aangan Hoga on Sahara One in Feb 2012 and Pyaar Ka Dard Hai Meetha Meetha Pyaara Pyaara on Star Plus on 18 June 2012.

Kavita Barjatya is on the advisory board of The ITA School of Performing Arts.
