= Dadi Amma... Dadi Amma Maan Jaao! =

Indian television series

- Genre: Drama
- Created by: Sooraj Barjatya
- Developed by: Sooraj Barjatya; Devaansh Barjatya
- Written by: Devaansh Barjatya
- Screenplay by: Abhishek Kumar
- Story by: Chandrashekhar Dhavalkar
- Directed by: Vikram Ghai
- Creative directors: Surabhi Horo; Fatema Rangila
- Starring: Seema Biswas; Mohan Joshi; Shilpa Tulaskar; Sheen Dass; Anagha Bhosale
- Theme music composer: Udbhav Ojha, Nishnat-Raja
- Opening theme: Dadi Amma Dadi Amma Maan Jaao...
- Country of origin: India
- Original language: Hindi
- No. of seasons: 1
- No. of episodes: 47

Production
- Executive producer: Vishesh Suri
- Producer: Devaansh Barjatya
- Production location: Indore
- Cinematography: Dinesh Singh, Alamgir Shaikh
- Editor: Shashank Harendra Singh
- Running time: 22 or 55 minutes
- Production company: Rajshri Productions

Original release
- Network: StarPlus
- Release: 27 January – 26 March 2020

Dadi Amma... Dadi Amma Maan Jaao! is an Indian Hindi television series on StarPlus. Produced by Rajshri Productions, it stars Seema Biswas, Mohan Joshi, Sheen Das and Anagha Bhosale. It premiered on 27 January 2020. The show was taken off the air abruptly due to the COVID-19 lockdown and later was announced that the show will not be brought back post the coronavirus pandemic. The series is digitally available on Disney+ Hotstar.

== Plot ==
Millennial sisters Anjali and Shraddha have dreams to fulfill along with the responsibility of taking care of their grandparents Urmila and Vijay. How they would balance both forms the crux of the story. On the other side, two brothers Shlok and Dhruv are fun-loving and the complete opposite of each other. Shlok meets Anjali one day and falls in love at first sight. He begins to pursue her with the help of Dhruv, who soon meets Shraddha and they constantly bicker with each other. On the other hand, Dhruv and Shlok's mother Rekha starts disliking the Pradhans and often locks horn with Urmila. Soon, Shraddha-Dhruv and Anjali-Shlok get married while Rekha plots against the Pradhans and sends some goons to just scare and threaten them. But, the goons brutally attacks Vikas, Shraddha, Urmila and Vijay while Vikas dies and others suffers injuries. On seeing this, Rekha feels guilty for her deeds while Shlok feels guilty for not being present in the situation to save them.

== Cast ==
=== Main ===
- Seema Biswas as Urmila Pradhan: Vijay's wife; Vikas' mother.
- Mohan Joshi as Vijay Pradhan: Urmila's husband, Vikas' father; He is a retired wing commander who suffers from memory loss.
- Sheen Dass as Anjali Pradhan Jhavar: Urmila and Vijay's grand daughter, Shraddha's elder sister, Shlok's wife, dead.
- Anagha Bhosale as Shraddha Pradhan Jhavar: Urmila and Vijay's grand daughter, Anjali's sister, Dhruv's wife.
- Rudra Kaushish as Vikas Pradhan: Urmila and Vijay's son, Anjali and Shraddha's father. He dies while some goons sent by Rekha attacks Pradhans.
- Shilpa Tulaskar as Rekha Sundarlal Jhavar: Shlok and Dhruv's mother; An industrialist who plots against the Pradhans.

=== Recurring ===
- Vedant Sharan as Gourav Juneja: Shraddha's love interest, Dhruv's Friend. He dies due to Rekha's evil plan who wants to destroy the Pradhans.
- Abhishek Singh Pathania as Shlok Jhavar: Anjali's husband, Sundarlal and Rekha's son.
- Ankit Raizada as Dhruv Jhavar: Shraddha's husband, Sundarlal and Rekha's son.
- Khalid Siddiqui as Sundarlal Jhavar: Rekha's husband, Shlok and Dhruv's father.
- Sachin Parikh as Prabhas Jhavar: Shlok and Dhruv's uncle, Namrata's husband.
- Sonia Shrivastava as Namrata Jhavar: Shlok and Dhruv's aunt, Prabhas’ wife.

== Production ==
=== Development ===
Initial shooting for the series took place at Indore in Madhya Pradesh. Speaking about shooting in Indore, Producer Sooraj Barjatya said, "It was a collective decision to shoot in Indore as our show is set against the backdrop of the city, and we wanted to make the screenplay authentic. We shot at famous locations including Maheshwar Fort, Sarafa Bazaar, Ahilya Bai Holkar palace."

It was reported to air on Star Bharat but was later decided to air on Star Plus.

Speaking about the series producer Sooraj Barjatya said, " This show is close to my heart. Its tagline, Pichhatar Saal Ke Bachhe, was coined by my father Rajkumar Barjatya,". Further, he said, "I have also included a lot of anecdotes from the time I spent with my father in the show," He also stated it as a 100 episodes finite series.

=== Casting ===
Seema Biswas, who was initially sceptical for playing grandmother, was cast as Urmila. Mohan Joshi was cast as Vijay who returns to television acting after 20 years. Sheen Das was cast as Anjali. Anagha Bhosale was cast as Shraddha. Besides, Rudra Kaushish, Abhishek Singh Pathania, Ankit Raizada, Shilpa Tulaskar, Khalid Siddiqui were cast then.

=== Cancellation ===
The series being a finite one, was reported to end in May 2020. However, due to COVID-19 outbreak, the shooting was stalled from 19 March 2020 indefinitely, and the airing of the series was stopped on 26 March 2020 and was supposed to return after the shootings were resumed. However, in May 2020 this series was axed abruptly by the channel confirming that this series is not returning.
