= Kaushik Ghatak =

Indian film director

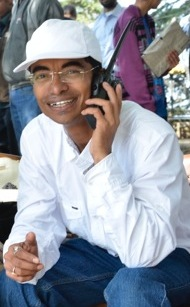
- Kaushik Ghatak in 2014
- Born: 12 August 1971 (age 55); Katwa, West Bengal, India
- Education: St. Xavier's School, Hazaribagh
- Occupation: Director
- Years active: 1998–present
- Spouse: Anita Ghatak

Kaushik Ghatak (born 12 August 1971) is an Indian film director. He began his career in the entertainment industry in India on 14 February 1998 as an apprentice assistant to Anurag Basu. He has directed several television serials including Kyunki Saas Bhi Kabhi Bahu Thi and a few advertisement films before he directed his first film Ek Vivaah... Aisa Bhi for Rajshri Productions. His next film was Samrat & Co. for producer, Kavita K. Barjatya, under the banner of Rajshri Productions.

== Early life and education ==
Kaushik Ghatak was born in Katwa in Bardhaman, West Bengal on 12 August 1971. He attended St. Xavier's School, Hazaribagh in Bihar & graduated from St. Xavier's college, Ranchi with Geology (Hons).

Anurag Basu provided Ghatak with the first break as an apprentice assistant; Ghatak assisted Basu on several television projects – Rishtey, Raahat, Saturday Suspense, Koshish-‐Ek Aasha and more. Ghatak also assisted Partho Mitra, Gaurav Pandey, Goutam Mukherjee and Amitabh Bhattacharyaon different shows, ad-films and television commercials.

== Career ==
=== Television ===
Ghatak's first independent show as a director was with a Bengali serial Amra Povashi aired on Alpha Bangla and with a Hindi serial Kyunki Saas Bhi Kabhi Bahu Thi produced by Balaji Telefilms and aired on Star Plus. Starting from the 35th episode up to the 155th episode, Ghatak directed over 100 episodes of Kyunki Saas Bhi Kabhi Bahu Thi and at this time the show registered the highest TRP ever at the time of original Mihir Virani's death.

Show	Channel	Notes
Kyunki Saas Bhi Kabhi Bahu Thi	Star Plus	About 120 initial episodes for Balaji Telefilms.
Kavita	Channel 9 Gold	Five initial episodes for Balaji Telefilms.
Sanskriti	Star Plus	About 125 initial episodes for Cinevistaas Limited.
Ssshhhh...Koi Hai	Star Plus	Five different episodic stories for Cinevistaas Limited.
Shagun	Star Plus	Ten re-‐launching episodes for S.D.P.
Saathiya – Pyar Ka Naya Ehsaas	Sahara One	Did the show set up for Cinevistaas Limited.
Sanjivani (TV series)	Star Plus	Complete series for Cinevistaas Limited.
Woh Rehne Waali Mehlon Ki	Sahara One	Complete show for Rajshri Productions.
Pyaar Ke Do Naam: Ek Raadha, Ek Shyaam	Star Plus	Did the show set up for Rajshri Productions.
Bandini (TV series)	NDTV Imagine	Did the show set up for Balaji Telefilms.
Do Hanson Ka Jodaa	NDTV Imagine	Did the show set up for Rajshri Productions.
Ek Hazaaron Mein Meri Behna Hai	Star Plus	For Cinevistaas Limited.
Pyaar Ka Dard Hai Meetha Meetha Pyaara Pyaara	Star Plus	Did the show set up for Rajshri Productions.
Ek Rishta Saajhedari Ka	Sony Entertainment Television	Did the show set up for Kavita Barjatya Productions.

=== Films ===
Ghatak made his directorial film debut in 2008 with the film Ek Vivaah... Aisa Bhi starring Sonu Sood and Isha Koppikar. It was produced by Sooraj R. Barjatya, under the Rajshri Productions banner. This film did not perform too well at the box office. His next project was with producer Kavita K. Barjatya, under the Rajshri Productions banner; the film was Samrat & Co. (2014).

== Personal life ==
Kaushik Ghatak was in love with Anita Ghatak and they had to wait for seven years before they could get married.
