= Paying Guest (TV series) =

Indian TV series

- Created by: Rajshri Productions
- Written by: Diljit Singh, Jimmy Baria, Ranbir Pushp (dialogues)
- Screenplay by: Diljit Singh, Jimmy Baria
- Directed by: Abhinav Pathak, Sameer Ganguly
- Starring: See Below
- Country of origin: India
- Original language: Hindi
- No. of episodes: 26

Production
- Executive producer: Rajkumar Barjatya
- Producer: Tarachand Barjatya
- Cinematography: Ajay Tandon
- Running time: 20 minutes

Original release
- Network: Doordarshan
- Release: 9 May 1985 – 1986

Paying Guest is an Indian TV Series released in 1985 on Doordarshan by Rajshri Productions. It revolves around the lives of Krishnakant Trivedi and his wife Sharda, who are staying in an old bungalow of suburban Bombay. Their children are grown up and settled abroad. To fight their loneliness in their old age, they plan to keep some paying guests. Every episode, new guests arrive as paying guests, each with a different story to tell. The show highlighted the problems faced by the then Indian middle class.

== Plot ==
The drama's narrative revolved around an elderly couple, portrayed by Subbiraj and Urmila Bhatt, who found themselves living alone in a large house after their children had settled abroad. Struck by the weight of their advancing age and solitude, they decided to fill their empty home by accommodating paying guests. This decision led them to contact individuals seeking accommodation.

Throughout the series, a succession of paying guests arrived, each bringing their own set of challenges and predicaments. The central theme of the drama was to underscore the difficulties that arise when strangers coexist under one roof. With a total of 26 episodes, the show presented varied stories featuring different characters.

== Cast ==
- Subbiraj as Krishnakant Trivedi
- Urmila Bhatt as Sharda, Krishnakant's wife
- Nandita Thakur as Daughter in law of Trivedi Family
- Dinesh Hingoo as Somnath, house keeper of the bungalow
- Chander Mohan Khanna as Champaklal, Mr. Krishnakant's neighbour
- Anu Dhawan as Champa, Champaklal's wife
- Madhuri Dixit as Neena (1 episode)
- Sahil Chaddha
- Mayur Verma

== Legacy ==
Paying Guest stood as an illustrative depiction of the everyday trials encountered by an Indian middle-class family. The drama, while not extraordinary, encompassed numerous subtleties reflective of contemporary life. The series initiated with an elderly couple residing alone in a spacious house due to their children's overseas settlements. Their pursuit to alleviate loneliness by welcoming paying guests revealed a poignant dilemma: aging parents in search of companionship. Amid our preoccupation with personal careers and lives, the show underscored the often-overlooked desire of aging couples to savor their remaining days with a complete family unit—a sentiment frequently disregarded. Conversely, the drama also delved into the myriad challenges faced by middle-class families, encompassing financial strains, living arrangements, and familial issues. It showcased the intricate tapestry of everyday concerns that the average family grapples with. The guest families brought their own set of relational and other complications to the household.

On a deeper level, the show's premise revolved around comedy and entertainment. In the journey of encountering diverse individuals throughout life, experiences accumulate, contributing significantly to our personal growth. Some encounters are positive, others negative, and some etch themselves into our memories indefinitely. Hence, the show remains profoundly relevant today, as it captures the essence of constantly accruing life experiences through interactions with others.
