= Rajkumar Barjatya =

Indian film producer (1941-2019)

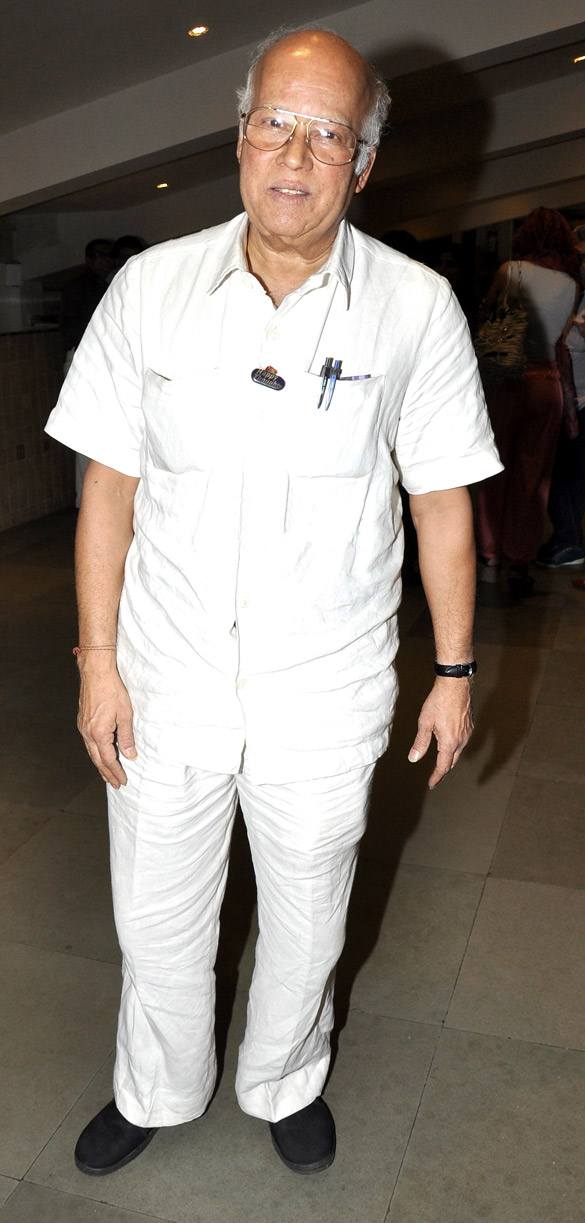
- Barjatya in 2012
- Born: 14 May 1941; Rajshri Bhawan, Kuchaman City, Jodhpur State, British India
- Died: 21 February 2019 (aged 77); Mumbai, Maharashtra, India
- Occupation: Producer
- Years active: 1972–2019
- Organization: Rajshri Productions
- Children: 2, including Sooraj R. Barjatya
- Father: Tarachand Barjatya

Rajkumar Barjatya also known as Raj Kumar Barjatya was an Indian film producer. He was part of the Barjatya family which founded Rajshri Productions. He is best known for producing the blockbuster Bollywood films Maine Pyar Kiya and Hum Aapke Hain Koun..! both directed by his son, Sooraj Barjatya who made his debut with the former film. He died on February 21, 2019, after a brief period of hospitalization in Mumbai.

== Early life ==
Rajkumar Barjatya joined Indian Institute of Technology, Kharagpur in 1962 and chose Mining Engineering. He resided in Rajendra Prasad Hall of Residence. He quit his studies in the summer of 1962 in order to join Rajshri Productions at the request of his father Tarachand Barjatya.

== Filmography ==
=== Producer ===
- Hum Chaar (2019)
- Prem Ratan Dhan Payo (2015)
- Jaana Pehchana (2011)
- Love U... Mr. Kalakaar! (2011)
- Isi Life Mein...! (2010)
- Ek Vivaah... Aisa Bhi (2008)
- Shaashu Ghara Chaalijibi (2006)
- Vivah (2006) : co-produced with Ajit Kumar Barjatya, Kamal Kumar Barjatya
- Main Prem Ki Diwani Hoon (2003)
- Hum Pyar Tumhi Se Kar Baithe (2002)
- Hum Saath-Saath Hain (1999)
- Hum Aapke Hain Koun...! (1994)

=== Associate producer ===
- Maine Pyar Kiya (1989)
- Saaransh (1984)
- Ek Baar Kaho (1980)
- Chitchor (1976)
- Tapasya (1976)
- Saudagar (1973)
- Piya Ka Ghar (1972)

=== Co-producer ===
- Naiyya (1979)
