= Ek Rishta Saajhedari Ka =

Indian television series

- Genre: Drama; Romance
- Created by: Kavita K. Barjatya
- Written by: Zama Habib; Kavita K. Barjatya
- Directed by: Kaushik Ghatak; Pushkar Pandiit
- Starring: See below
- Theme music composer: Monty Sharma
- Opening theme: "Ek Rishta Saajhedari Ka"
- Country of origin: India
- Original language: Hindi
- No. of seasons: 1
- No. of episodes: 160

Production
- Producers: Kavita K. Barjatya; Kaushik Ghatak
- Cinematography: Sanjay Malwankar
- Camera setup: Multi-camera
- Running time: 22 minutes approx.
- Production company: Kavita Barjatya Productions

Original release
- Network: Sony Entertainment Television
- Release: 8 August 2016 – 31 March 2017

Ek Rishta Saajhedari Ka (transl. A relationship of partnership) is an Indian drama television series which aired from 8 August 2016 to 31 March 2017 on Sony TV. Produced by Kavita Barjatya Productions of Kavita K. Barjatya, it starred Kinshuk Vaidya and Shivya Pathania as Aryan Sethia and Sanchi Mittal.

== Plot ==
The show is set in the city of Jaipur in India. The Sethiya family has a son called Aryan and the Mithal family has a daughter called Saanchi. The families are given each other's reference and a meeting is arranged for Aryan and Saanchi. At first they hate each other but eventually get along and slowly fall in love.

Saanchi and Aryan begin seeing each other but their marriage alliance runs into trouble when the Sethiyas, on the verge of bankruptcy, decide to call off the wedding. The Mithals come to their rescue and thus the wedding takes place bringing both families close to each other in the process.

The rest of the series follows how Saanchi and Aryan decide to make their marriage an equal partnership and both try to rescue their families and family members from trouble. In a plot twist, Saanchi is forced to fake her death when much Aryan's family turns against her due to misunderstandings created by Nikita who is obsessed with Aryan. She returns in a new avatar and goes by the name, Malvika Seghal to expose Nikita along with the help of Aryan and Nilima. Nikita is finally exposed after a long time. The series ended on a positive note with all misunderstandings cleared and Saanchi giving birth to her and Aryan's first child.

== Cast ==
- Kinshuk Vaidya as Aryan Sethia: Sarita and Diwakar's younger son; Nikita’s ex–husband; Sanchi's husband; Sushant's younger brother; Nishant and Neeti's elder cousin; Prabhat and Neelima's nephew
- Shivya Pathania as Sanchi Aryan Sethia (née Mittal) / Malavika Sehgal: Kusum and Viren's daughter; Aryan's wife; Vaibhav's younger sister
- Sooraj Thapar as Diwakar Sethia: Sarita's husband; Aryan and Sushant's father; Prabhat's elder brother
- Surbhi Tiwari as Sarita Sethia: Diwakar's wife; Aryan and Sushant's mother
- Nitesh Pandey as Viren Mittal: Kusum's husband; Sanchi and Vaibhav's father
- Pubali Sanyal as Kusum Mittal: Viren's wife; Sanchi and Vaibhav's mother
- Sanjay Gagnani as Vaibhav Mittal: Kusum and Viren's son; Sanchi's elder brother
- Waseem Mushtaq as Sushant Sethia: Sarita and Diwakar's elder son; Aryan's elder brother
- Sunayana Fozdar as Priyanka Sethia: Sushant's wife; Aryan’s sister-in-law; Sarita and Diwakar's daughter-in-law
- Sonal Jha as Chandra Mittal: Viren's sister; Sanchi and Vaibhav's aunt
- Simran Natekar as Tanu; Chandra's daughter; Sanchi and Vaibhav's younger cousin
- Yajuvendra Singh as Prabhat Sethia: Aryan's paternal uncle; Neelima's husband; Diwakar's younger brother; Nishant and Neeti's father
- Mamata Verma as Neelima Sethia: Aryan’s aunt; Prabhat’s wife; Nishant and Neeti's mother
- Raj Anadkat as Nishant Sethia: Prabhat and Neelima’s son; Aryan and Sushant's younger cousin; Neeti's brother
- Isha Mishra as Neeti Sethia: Prabhat's and Neelima’s daughter, Nishant's sister; Aryan and Sushant's younger cousin
- Vinita Joshi Thakkar as Mala Sethia: Sushant’s former lover; Sonu's mother
- Dwij Mehta as Sonu Sethia: Mala and Sushant's illegitimate child; Priyanka’s adoptive son
- Zalak Desai as Nikita: Aryan's former wife
- Surya Sharma as Rishi: boy who at start likes Sanchi on meeting her in the marriage of a friend
- Mehmood Junior as Mansoor: Diwakar’s childhood friend and driver
