= Smita Jaykar =

Indian actress (born 1954)

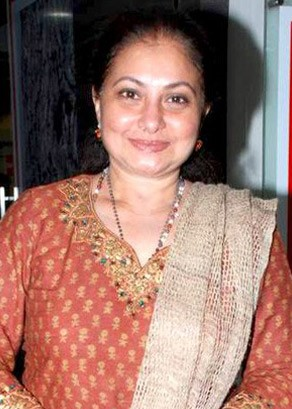
- Jaykar at 'Road to Shirdi' book launch
- Born: 20 August 1954 (age 71); Thakurdwar, Mumbai, Maharashtra, India
- Years active: 1995–present

Smita Jaykar (born 20 August 1954) is an Indian actress known for playing supporting roles in Hindi movies and TV shows.

She is known for her roles, most often as a mother, in Marathi-language television serials and films. In 2018, she worked on a theatrical adaptation of Devdas with Ashvin Gidwani Productions (AGP World).

== Personal life ==
A native of the Thakurdwar neighbourhood in South Mumbai, she is a Maharashtrian. Her husband, Mohan Jaykar, is the son of esteemed Marathi barrister Barr Jaykar.

Smita is a very spiritual person. She conducts lectures on auras and chakras.

== Filmography ==
Key
†	Denotes films that have not yet been released

=== Films ===
Year	Film	Role	Notes
1995	Dil Ka Doctor		
1997	Pardes	Padma (Paddy)	
1998	Qila	Suman A. Singh	
1998	Sar Utha Ke Jiyo		
1998	Prem Aggan	Mrs. Seema Singh	
1999	Hum Aapke Dil Mein Rehte Hain	Megha's mother	
1999	Sarfarosh	Ajay's mother	
1999	Hum Dil De Chuke Sanam	Amrita	
1999	Mast	Sharda Mathur	
2000	Phir Bhi Dil Hai Hindustani	Ajay's mother	
2000	Hadh Kar Di Aapne	Mrs. Khanna	
2000	Kunwara	Balraj's wife	
2000	Hamara Dil Aapke Paas Hai	Avinash's mother	
2000	Astitva	Meghna	
2000	Raju Chacha	Mother Superior	
2001	Aashiq	Pooja's mother	
2001	Censor	Mrs. Akhtar (Censor Board)	
2001	Abhay	Tejaswini's mother	
2001	Bas Itna Sa Khwaab Hai	Gayetri C. Shrivastav	
2001	Yeh Raaste Hain Pyaar Ke		
2001	Pyaar Ishq Aur Mohabbat	Mrs. Sabarwal	
2001	Rehnaa Hai Terre Dil Mein		
2001	Deewaanapan	Suraj's mother	
2002	Pyaar Diwana Hota Hai	Mrs. Khurana	
2002	Na Tum Jaano Na Hum	Akshaye's mother	
2002	Devdas	Kaushalya	
2002	23rd March 1931: Shaheed		
2002	Kyaa Dil Ne Kahaa	Maya (Rahul's mom)	
2002	Mujhse Dosti Karoge	Mrs. Khanna	
2002	Pyaasa	Mrs. Thakur	
2003	Surya		
2003	Kyon?	Prabha Mathur	
2003	Om	Om's mother	
2003	Chori Chori	Mrs. Malhotra	
2004	Kismat	Mrs. Gosai	
2004	Madhoshi	Mrs. Sumitra Kaul (Anupama's mother)	
2004	Dil Maange More	Nikhil's mother	
2005	Sab Kuch Hai Kuch Bhi Nahin	Shanti N. Malhotra	
2005	Vaah! Life Ho Toh Aisi	Priya's mother	
2006	Taxi No. 9211	Rupali's mother	
2006	Darwaza Bandh Rakho	Sarita K. Shah	
2006	Rocky: The Rebel	Rocky's mother	
2006	Baabul	Suman	
2008	Mumbai Meri Jaan	Sejal's mother	
2008	Ek Vivaah... Aisa Bhi	Mrs. Ajmera	
2009	Ajab Prem Ki Ghazab Kahani	Sharda	
2009	Naughty @ 40	Maya	
2010	The Hangman	Parvati	
2010	Florida Road	Kiran	English film
2011	Thank You	Sanjana's mother	
2012	Tere Naal Love Ho Gaya	Viren's mother	
2014	Yaariyan		
2014	Anuradha		
2014	Samrat & Co.	Narayani Dave	
2014	Sonali Cable		
2015	Bezubaan Ishq	Laxmi Shah	
2016	Kaanu		
2016	Akira	Akira's mother	
2017	Chhoti Si Guzaarish	Sugna	
2021	Mimi		
2022	Petipack		Gujarati films
2022	Adko Dadko		Gujarati films
2025	Romeo S3	Goa CM	
2025	Kis Kisko Pyaar Karoon 2	Zeenat	

=== Television ===
Year(s)	Show Title	Role	Notes
2022	Kashibai Bajirao Ballal	Maharani Tarabai Rajaram I Bhosale	—
2013	Ghar Aaja Pardesi	—	
2009–2011	Yahan Main Ghar Ghar Kheli	Chandraprabha Udaypratap Singh	—
2004–2008	Adhuri Ek Kahani	Mrunal Patwardhan	—
2000–2001	Noorjahan	—	—
1998–1999	Daal Mein Kala	Kiran	—
1998	Khamosh Awazein	—	—
1997–1998	Ghutan	—	—
1994–1995	Kabhi Yeh Kabhi Woh	Ramila	—
1994	Junoon	Aditya Dhanraj's mother	—
1988	Aahvaan	Uma	—

== Stage credits ==
- Aai Retire Hotey (2014) staged at Yashwantrao Chavan Natyagruha, Veena.
