= Mehul Nisar =

Indian television and film actor

- Occupation: Actor
- Years active: 1998–present

Mehul Nisar is an Indian television and film actor. He started his career with the 1998 television series Hip Hip Hurray. He has acted in more than 25 television shows and has appeared in more than 100 television commercials.

== Career ==
Mehul Nisar started his career with the TV series Hip Hip Hurray in 1998, and has acted in many more television shows since then. He has had a long association with Rajshri Films, working with them on Pyaar Ke Do Naam: Ek Raadha, Ek Shyaam, Woh Rehne Waali Mehlon Ki and Yahan Main Ghar Ghar Kheli.

In 2006 he appeared in an American television film titled The Curse of King Tut's Tomb.

== Television ==
- 1999 - Hip Hip Hurray
- 2000 - Titliyan
- 2000 - Apna Apna Style
- 2001 - Hip Hip Hurray 2
- 2001 - Hamare Tumhare
- 2002 - Par Is Dil Ko Kaise Samjaye
- 2002 - Kehta Hai Dil
- 2002 - Ssshhhh...Koi Hai
- 2003 - Aahat
- 2003 - C.I.D.
- 2004 - Raat Hone Ko Hai
- 2004 - Pyaar Ki Kashti Mein
- 2005 - Hey...Yehii To Haii Woh!
- 2005 - Woh Rehne Waali Mehlon Ki
- 2005 - Hotel Kingston
- 2005 - Dekho Magar Pyaar Se
- 2006 - Pyaar Ke Do Naam: Ek Raadha, Ek Shyaam
- 2006 - Tumhari Disha
- 2007 - Jabb Love Hua
- 2008 - Mata Ki Chowki
- 2008 - Jiya Jale
- 2008 - Rubi
- 2009 - Yahan Main Ghar Ghar Kheli
- 2010 - Jaane Pehchaane Se... Ye Ajnabbi
- 2011 - Chidiya Ghar
- 2014 - Kaisi Yeh Yaariaan
- 2016 - Bahu Hamari Rajni Kant
- 2018 - Qayamat Ki Raat
- 2020–2024; 2025; 2026 - Anupamaa
- 2021 - Santoshi Maa - Sunayein Vrat Kathayein
- 2022 Kabhi Kabhie Ittefaq Sey
- 2022–2023 Palkon Ki Chhaon Mein 2
- 2024 Mera Balam Thanedaar
- 2024 Suhaagan
- 2026–present Dr. Aarambhi

=== Filmography ===
- 2000 - Mohabbatein
- 2006 - The Curse of King Tut's Tomb
