= Yahan Main Ghar Ghar Kheli =

Indian television series

- Genre: Drama
- Created by: Rajshri Productions
- Directed by: Arvind Babbal; Rohit Dwiwedi; Amit Gupta
- Creative directors: Fatima Rangila, Raghvendra Singh
- Starring: See below
- Voices of: Shreya Ghoshal; Pamela Jain; Suresh Wadkar; Shaan; Sadhana Sargam
- Opening theme: "Yahan Main Ghar Ghar Kheli" by Shreya Ghoshal
- Country of origin: India
- Original language: Hindi
- No. of seasons: 1
- No. of episodes: 697

Production
- Producer: Kavita K. Barjatya
- Camera setup: Multi camera
- Running time: approx. 20 minutes
- Production company: Rajshri Productions

Original release
- Network: Zee TV
- Release: 17 November 2009 – 13 July 2012

Yahan Main Ghar Ghar Kheli (English: I've Spent My Childhood Here), (International title: My Golden Home) produced by Rajshri Productions, was an Indian dramatic serial that aired on Zee TV Monday to Friday evenings. It was well received, and stopped running on air in July 2012. It was aired on Apna TV in New Zealand and FBC TV in Fiji. Notable actors Zarina Wahab, Zahida Parveen, Alok Nath and Smita Jaykar acted in this serial as well. Lyricist Raghvendra Singh is the creative director in this serial.

== Plot ==
Yahan Main Ghar Ghar Kheli revolves around the story of the families associated with a mansion called Swarn Bhawan (meaning: The house of gold) in the city of Ujjain. Swarn Bhawan has been passed down the Thakur family and Thakur Uday Pratap Singh, his wife Thakurain Chandra Prabha, their son Swarn Prakash and their youngest daughter Swarn Abha live there. Their eldest daughter Swarn Lata is married and lives with her husband.

Unfortunately, the Thakur family go into deep debt and are forced to sell Swarn Bhawan. It is bought by Jagmohan Prasad (Uday Pratap's father's driver's son). The Thakur family has to leave Swarn Bhawan and live with Chandra Prabha's brother Raghav Pandit, who was once the Thakur's dewan. Abha ends up working as Jagmohan's employee in Swarn Bhawan under a false name Tasveer. Jagmohan's youngest son Karan Prasad and Abha fall in love. Karan and Abha marry. Initially, the families refuse to accept them but after a lot of struggle they finally come around. Abha's ex-fiancé, Sanskar, is still madly in love with her and decides to kill Karan but fails repeatedly. Karan's best friend Sania falls in love with Sanskar and he also pretends to love her back in order to stay close to Abha. Because of a misunderstanding created by Sanskar, Karan divorces Abha but discovers the truth and pleads Abha for forgiveness and they remarry. Sanskar also has a change of heart. Sanskar and Sania get married.

Everything is going well and then suddenly Karan's maternal aunt Yashodhara comes to Swarn Bhawan. She is sweet and starts taking care of the house like a mother would. Karan and Abha go to Singapore for their honeymoon. It is revealed the Karan's mother Pratibha, who was believed to be dead, is alive. Karan's maternal uncle, Ranjit, wants to ruin the Prasad family due to an old enmity between him and Pratibha. He tries to create misunderstanding between the Prasad family and Pratibha. However, with Abha and Pratibha's efforts he is caught and punished but his other sister and Jagmohan's second wife, Yashodhra saves herself. Pratibha, who has lost her memory and behaves like a child is continuously targeted by Yashodhara, her son, Dushyant and his wife. Their efforts are thwarted by Abha, who manages to send Pratibha to a rehabilitation centre to be treated. Meanwhile, Yashodhara attempts to kill her step son Karan to gain ownership of Swarn Bhawan. Karan meets with an accident in Mumbai and is presumed dead. Abha meets his lookalike Sidharth, an actor and screenwriter whose actual name is Ranchod. It is revealed that Ranchod is in fact Karan's twin brother who Jagmohan handed over at birth to a Mr. Tiwari who was incorrectly pronounced guilty in a court case because of Jagmohan. Only Jagmohan and the nanny are aware of Ranchod's existence. Ranchod/Siddharth agrees to help Abha and masquerade as Karan for 11 days after which they return to Mumbai. Abha searches for Karan one last time. Ranchod happens to meet Karan in the hospital and thinking Karan is about to die, promises him that he will protect Abha and rest of family from Yashodhara.

The Prasad family expects Karan and Abha to bring Ranchod home, with the family planning a grand birthday party for both sons. Abha is about to tell the family the sad news about Karan, when Ranchod enters. Abha finds out that she is pregnant with Karan's baby. Yashodhara and Dushyant attempt to kill the entire Prasad and Thakur families but fail and are exposed by Abha and Karan (Ranchod). Yashodhara is arrested together with Dushyant and his wife. During a religious Holi celebration, Ranchod is exposed and then explains that he was fulfilling Karan's last wish.

Karan is revealed to be alive and is saved by Dr. Arundhati who decides to take him home. As Karan cannot speak and is paralyzed, she names him Neel. Shaili sees a picture of Karan in the newspaper and decides to keep him away from Abha and Ranchod. Abha and Ranchod marry reluctantly after they realise Karan is most likely dead and with pressure from both families. Abha is still sad over Karan's disappearance trips down the stairs and loses her baby as a result of Shaili and Dushyant's actions.

=== Two years later ===
It is Abha and Ranchod's second anniversary and Karan is able to talk and move by now. He returns to Ujjain, greeting Abha with rose petals. Dr. Arundhati is surprised when Jagmohan introduces Shaili as Karan's sister-in-law. Arundhati recalls Shaili had introduced herself as Maithili, Karan's cousin. Ranchod finds out that it was Dushyant who caused Abha's miscarriage, and his rage, he severely injures Dushyant, who dies. Ranchod is framed for murdering him and is arrested. Abha knows that Ranchod is innocent and has to fight his case. On the day of the hearing, Shaili tells Karan everything about Abha's marriage with Ranchod. Karan is extremely upset thinking Abha has moved on with Ranchod. He tells Abha that he will help her fight the case but hints their relationship as being over. Karan and Abha trap Shaili and reveal her truth before everyone on the final day of Ranchod's hearing. Abha and Karan find evidence to prove Ranchod's innocence. Dushyant's wife is revealed to be the killer. Ranchod is able to bring Abha and Karan back together.

The Prasad family start looking for someone to marry their middle son Veer and a girl named Priyanka is chosen. Meanwhile, Abha's father finds a book that his ancient ancestors wrote that tells about the chilling history of Swarn Bhawan and the destruction of the daughters in the household at the hands of a woman called Vasundhara. Abha lets Shaili come back into the family to let her be with her daughter Asmi. Shaili is now a good daughter-in-law and has changed her ways. Priyanka's nanny, who enters Swarn Bhawan is really Yashodhra in disguise. The spirit of Vasundara possesses Yashodhara to scare the family. Abha delivers her baby but Vasundhara is waiting to take it into the spirit world. Abha stops Vasundara, who agrees to give her baby back, stating that Abha's affection has won. She then turns back into Yashodara who threatens to kill the baby unless they give her Swarn Bhawan. However, Vasundara comes back and hands the baby to Karan, then causing Yashodhara to get hit by a truck, finally killing her.

Karan tells Priyanka to leave the house, stating that she was the reason that Yashodhara came back. She insists that she only did it to give Yashodhara back her place in the house. But as she is walking out of the house, she faints. The doctor reveals that she is pregnant. Karan decides to let her stay and everybody seems to forgive her but she vows to break the unity in the house. Karan and Vimal come home and state that Vimal's dream project has been approved. Priyanka, wanting to create a rift between the brothers, sets the factory on fire. Karan is blamed for the fire that poses a financial problem for the Prasads.

Raj Singhania, Karan's childhood friend, buys Swarn Bhawan claiming that he is saving it from becoming a hotel. However, for this, Karan has to marry Raj's sister Koyal who keeps telling Karan that they have a daughter named Tanvi. Karan and his family finally unmask Koyal and make her confess. Koyal and Raj leave, with Raj apologizing for her behaviour but also stating that he still believes Karan might be Tanvi's father.

Swarn Bhawan is preparing for Pavani's naming ceremony. Abha's sister, Lata, goes to buy a gift for Pavani but is later found raped. When she wakes up in the emergency room she points towards Karan's brother, Vimal who is arrested. Karan decides to be his lawyer. Abha is forced to choose between Lata and Vimal. Lata's boss, Dev, offers to marry her. Dev's mother also accepts Lata. Lata starts to like Dev but Chandra Prabha grows suspicious. She discovers that Dev is Tanvi's father but Koyal kills Chandra Prabha with her daughter Tanvi as witness. Raj (Koyal's brother), Karan and Abha find out the truth and they stop the wedding. Koyal and AK/Dev are arrested and Raj marries Lata.

Abha and Thakur get on a bus to return home. However, some goons kidnap Abha and Pavani. Thakur, with the police, eventually find Abha lying on the ground in the woods with Pavani sitting next to her crying. They reach home safe, but Abha behaves very differently. It is then revealed that Abha is an impostor. She is really a dancer names Albeli hired by Priyanka to ruin Abha's reputation in the house. Abha who is being held captive, manages to escape but severely injures herself. Before she reaches Swarn Bhawan, she is passed out and is taken to a hospital where she has a surgery. She gains consciousness but now has the mind of a child.

Kanika plans to sell Swarn Bhawan. Albeli finds out and tells Priyanka. Priyanka makes a deal with Kanika to split the money equally for hiding the truth. Albeli reveals Kanika's truth and kicks her out while protecting Priyanka. Albeli is told that Abha met a fatal truck accident and died. Albeli, presuming Abha to be dead, decides to take Abha's place in the family. She starts loving Karan and his family. Albeli exposes Priyanka's evil intentions. Priyanka tries to expose Albeli's truth but the family does not believe her and Priyanka is thrown out of Swarn Bhawan.

Abha regains her memory and tries to convince everyone that she is the real Abha but no one believes her. Abha leaves Swarn Bhawan. Priyanka has realised her mistakes and helps Abha and Karan reunite at a dargah. Albeli eventually realizes the goodness of Abha's heart and that she can never replace her. She leaves. Priyanka is welcomed back to the family.

Then the family pandit comes and warns the family about the future tragedy. Abha and Karan pay a visit to Nilanjana. The family plans to go for a picnic. Nilanjana & her husband Dr. Viren Roy along with their children also goes to the picnic. Abha sees a bad and strange dream every time. On their return, a car accident takes place in which all the men in the family died except Karan, together with Dr. Viren's wife Nilanjana. Abha comes with the dead bodies of men of the family. All the women are shocked. Thakur unable to control this trauma goes into coma. Karan is in hospital in critical condition. The doctors says that only Dr. Viren can do the operation of Karan. Dr. Viren, who was extremely angry at Karan as he felt Karan responsible for his wife's death whom he deeply loved. When Abha asks Viren to operate Karan, he immediately disagrees. But then he agrees on one condition that he would operate Karan only if she marries him. Abha has to agree for this marriage to save Karan's life. Then Abha & Viren get married with Bengali customs. Dr. Viren keeps his promise and operates Karan. Karan is saved but he loses his memory. Abha brings changes in Dr. Viren, who thanks Abha and asks her to forgive him. He also frees Abha from the false marriage and remarriage of Karan and Abha takes place. Meanwhile, Lata manages to convince Raj to allow Aruna, his true mother, to live in their house. Raj hates Aruna because he believes that Aruna cheated his father; however it was Daai Maa who had created the misunderstanding between Aruna and Raj's father. Raj has deep faith in Daai Maa and he treats her like his mother. Daai Maa gets raged when Lata brings Aruna back home. She swears to take revenge from Lata. But Lata promises Aruna that she will give back Aruna her place in the house and Raj's heart.

Meanwhile, Sushant, who is sent by Priyanka's parents enters Swarn Bhawan as a family accountant of Priyanka's family. He is actually Viren's brother-in-law who left his parents alone only for money. Sushant is an evil person. He tries to impress Priyanka and turn her against her family. He becomes successful as already Sheetal (Abha's mami) had turned Priyanka against Abha. Abha, Karan & Viren go to Mumbai for the treatment of Karan. Karan's operation also becomes successful and he regains his memory. Karan learns about Abha and Viren's marriage. Viren regrets what he had done. Karan says that he does not need forgiveness because Viren lost his wife due to Karan's mistake. Viren now puts his trust in the Gods. They return to Ujjain.

Meanwhile, Shaili's mother Karuna enters Swarn Bhawan after hearing the sad news of death of the men of the family. Karan is unaware about the death of the men of his family (as Abha do not tell him about this because Viren informs her that Karan is not fully well and she should tell him later). On Abha's request the widowed women of family agrees to wear coloured dresses and presuming before Karan that they are not widows. Karan reaches Swarn Bhawan. He is warmly welcomed by his family. All try to hide the truth from Karan. But then Shaili who had been believing that her husband Vimal is alive comes downstairs in a white widow dress. All are shocked. Finally, Karan discovers about the truth. Actually, it was the evil plan of Sushant and Priyanka who managed to get Shaili make her daughter accept the truth of her husband's death. Priyanka blames Karan for the death of the men of the family as he was driving that car which crashed. Karan is full of remorse and cries loudly. The other women of the family console Karan and tell him that he was not responsible for this but this was the game of fate.

Now, Karan pledges that he will not allow the tears to come in the eyes of any member of the family and he will equally treat Paavani, Asmi (Shaili's daughter) and Nishant (Priyanka's son). Then the comatose Thakur Uday Pratap regains consciousness. Abha, Karan and their family ask Thakur Sahab to live with them in Swarn Bhawan. Though reluctant, Thakur Sahab agrees. Now Abha and Karan decide to get the widowed ladies of the house Shaili, Priyanka and Kanika remarried. Pratibha also supports them. Abha and Karan go to meet with a Pandit and ask him to search a good bride for them. Thakur gives Karan some savings, advising him to do a business. The family decides to start an Achar-Papad business. They get their first order. All the ladies work hard.

Daai maa keeps a puja for welfare of Raj's child (she is presuming to be good). Abha is also there that time. While Daai maa is talking to a pandit regarding puja, Abha and Lata find Daai Maa's passbook in her room which was hidden in a flower vase. In the passbook, it is mentioned that Daai maa has a family account with someone. Meanwhile, the pandit tells the Singhanias that the unborn child's grandmother will have to go to Kshipra river and bring its water. Then the child's mother will have to bathe with that water. Abha says that Aruna is the child's grandmother and she will do that. Daai maa get jealous. Daai maa also learns that Lata has known her secret. Thus she plans to kill Lata by burning her. Therefore, after Aruna comes with Kshipra river's water with her in a matka and get busy in other preparations. Daai maa empties the matka containing water and fills it with gasoline. Lata bathes with it and her clothes catches fire. The doctor informs that Lata's body was wet with gasolene. A female police inspector arrives with her force. Daai maa blames Aruna, whom inspector believes, and arrests Aruna.

Lata regains consciousness. She is shocked after hearing about the arrest of Aruna. Raj files a case against Aruna. Lata at once understand that it is Daai Maa who tried to burn her and also instigated Raj against Aruna. She also files a case against Daai Maa and asks Abha to fight this case. Raj is upset with Lata because of this.

Abha and Lata try to find D.M. Shikhawat with whom Daai Maa had a joint account. Abha discovers that this D.M. Shikhawat is Devashish Mukherji aka Ashmit Kappor (Koyal's husband and Lata's rapist) who is Daai Maa's real son. Next day, Abha arrives at the court late. She tells the reason that on her way, an accident happened on the road in which her sister's husband's relative Devashish Mukherji died. Daai Maa who is also present in the court is shocked. She shouts at Abha that she is telling lie. In grief and worry, she finally confesses to Raj that Dev is her son whom she kept away from her for his bright future. That moment Devashish also enters the court. Daai Maa then realizes that Dev is unharmed and says that she has no relation to him. After Abha holds a gun to Dev's head, Daai Maa confesses that Dev is her son and that she tried to burn Lata alive. Abha says that she had to tell this lie so that Daai Maa could confess her crime. Aruna is proven innocent and is released. Daai Maa is jailed. Now Raj apologises Aruna for his behavior and asks her to come with them in her home. Abha, Lata and Aruna are happy.

Shaili tells everyone that Priyanka ran away to marry Sushant. Abha and Ranchod go to Sushant's house and find Swarn Bhawan owner transferring papers and money that Priyanka gave him. Abha goes and stops the wedding. Ranchod exposes Sushant's plan in front of Priyanka by showing her Swarn Bhawan owner transferring papers. Abha asks Sushant to leave Priyanka's life forever and not to show his face to their family again. Then, Sushant is murdered, members of Swarn Bhawan are suspected, and are arrested one after another however the truth is finally revealed; Shaili's mother Karuna with her car CD177 was the culprit and she is arrested.

Karan and Abha start thinking about the remarriage of widowed ladies of Swarn Bhawan. Karan's friend who is a police officer, comes and proposes to marry Shaili. All are happy when Shaili agrees. Kanika and Priyanka's marriage also get fixed. Abha and Karan promises Pratibha that the responsibility of wedding is theirs and they will try their best to make it an unforgettable wedding. Abha and Karan do the Kanyadaan of all three of them. Thakur Uday Pratap gifts a book to each bride as his blessing.

Everything settles in Swarn Bhawan and all ends well in Yahan Main Ghar Ghar Kheli International title : My Golden Home.

== Cast ==
- Suhasi Goradia Dhami as Swarnabha Karan Prasad / Albeli (Double role)
- Karan Grover as Karan Jagmohan Prasad / Ranchod (Double role)
- Jayshree Arora as Saraswati Ram Prasad
- Shishir Sharma as Jagmohan Ram Prasad
- Zarina Wahab / Natasha Sinha / Surbhi Tiwari as Pratibha Jagmohan Prasad
- Zahida Parveen as Yashodhara Sahay / Yashodhara Jagmohan Prasad / Gayatri
- Harsh Vashisht as Vimal Jagmohan Prasad
- Karuna Pandey as Shaili Vimal Prasad
- Mehul Nisar as Veer Jagmohan Prasad
- Dimple Inamdar as Priyanka Veer Prasad
- Alok Nath as Thakur Uday Pratap Singh
- Smita Jaykar as Thakurain Chandra Prabha Uday Pratap Singh
- Tarun Mehta as Thakur Swarnprakash Singh
- Lavina Tandon / Silkeena Kaur / Shivangi Sharma as Thakurain Kanika Prakash Singh
- Sameer Dharmadhikari as Raj Singhania
- Namrata Thapa as Swarnlata Raj Singhania
- Kiran Bhargava as Laachi Shikhawat (Daai Ma)
- Varun Khandelwal as Dushyant Sahay
- Sonica Handa as Devyani Dushyant Sahay
- Pankaj Berry as Raghav Pandit
- Sonali Naik as Sheetal Raghav Pandit
- Ankur Nayyar as Sanskaar
- Preeti Chaudhary as Sania
- Megha Gupta as Dr. Arundhati
- Natasha Sharma as Vasundhara
- Darshan Pandya as Ashmit Kapoor / Devashish Mukherji / Dev Mohan Shekhawat
- Sonia Singh as Koyal Singhania / Koyal Dev Mohan Shekhawat
- Mohammed Iqbal Khan as Dr. Viren Roy
- Sameksha as Nilanjana Viren Roy
- Madhu Raja as Promita (Nilanjana's mother)
- Kishori Shahane as Karuna (Shaili's Mother)
- Abir Goswami as Sushant

== Awards ==
Zee Rishtey Awards 2009

- Favourite Bada Sadasya - Alok Nath as Thakur Uday Pratap Singh
- Favourite Naya Sadasya (Female) - Suhasi Goradia Dhami as Swarn Abha

Zee Rishtey Awards 2010

- Favourite Aadarniya Sadasya - Alok Nath & Smita Jaykar as Uday Pratap and Chandra Prabha
- Favourite Behen - Suhasi Goradia Dhami as Swarn Abha
- Favourite Beta - Karan Grover as Karan Prasad

Zee Rishtey Awards 2011

- Favourite Beti - Suhasi Goradia Dhami as Swarn Abha
- Favourite Show (Fiction) - Yahaaan Main Ghar Ghar Kheli
- Popular Face(Male) - Karan Grover as Karan Prasad
