= Bada Naam Karenge =

2025 Indian Web series

- Release poster
- Genre: Comedy; Romantic drama
- Showrunner: Sooraj R. Barjatya
- Written by: S. Manasvi; Vidit Tripathi
- Directed by: Palash Vaswani
- Starring: Ritik Ghanshani; Ayesha Kaduskar
- Music by: Anurag Saikia
- Country of origin: India
- Original language: Hindi

Production
- Producer: Sooraj R. Barjatya
- Cinematography: Shiv Prakash Rathour
- Editor: Gourav Gopal Jha
- Camera setup: Multi-camera
- Production company: Rajshri Productions

Original release
- Network: SonyLIV
- Release: 7 February 2025

Bada Naam Karenge is an Indian Hindi-language Romantic drama television series directed by Palash Vaswani, and its showrunner is Sooraj R. Barjatya. Produced under the banner of Rajshri Productions, starring Ritik Ghanshani and Ayesha Kaduskar in the lead role. The series is available to watch on SonyLIV

== Premise ==
Bada Naam Karenge follows the evolving love story of Rishabh (Ritik Ghanshani) and Surbhi (Ayesha Kaduskar) across two timelines—one set during the nationwide lockdown in March 2020 and the other in the present day.

Initially strangers who clash, circumstances force them to stay together during the lockdown, leading to unexpected companionship and a slow-burning romance. During the initial timeline, Rishabh, a Mumbai-based MBA student, hosts a party just before an unforeseen lockdown. Due to drinking and misinterpreted situations, he and Surbhi find themselves staying together for a few days. As they navigate moments of discomfort and unspoken emotions, their connection gradually deepens, leading to an unexpected romance which ends when Surbhi does not show up just when Rishabh was about to propose her.

In the present, Rishabh reluctantly agrees to an arranged marriage meeting, only to be surprised when the prospective bride turns out to be Surbhi. While they wish to marry, they choose to keep their past connection a secret, fearing disapproval from Rishabh's conservative family. Meanwhile, Surbhi's more progressive household is open to their love.

The series blends romance, humor, and drama, weaving a heartfelt narrative of love, misunderstandings, and family expectations

== Plot ==
Rishabh and Surbhi are two young individuals navigating the challenges of an arranged marriage. The narrative alternates between two timelines: one set in the past in Mumbai and the other unfolding in the present in Madhya Pradesh, where their families come together.

| No. | Episode |
|---|---|
| Episode 1 | Main Tujhe Phir Milungi (En: I Shall Meet You Again) |
In Madhya Pradesh, a hesitant Rishabh and his family go to meet a girl for his marriage, only for Risahbh to be shocked to discover that the girl is Surbhi. In the past, in Mumbai, Rishabh coincidentally meets Surbhi through a common friend at a club, where she is celebrating her birthday with her friends. She invites Rishabh and his friend Ankur to join her since she has already paid for 20 members, but only 18 have shown up. Rishabh mocks Surbhi for not drinking, and she fires back, leading to mutual disdain between them. A few months later, Rishabh throws a party at his home the night before the lockdown, hoping to impress Sunny Khadelwal, the owner of Choco and Cinnamon. Rishabh wants to gain work experience to join his family business, Shree Ganga Sweets: Swaad Sanskar Ka, and expand it to tier-1 cities and internationally. Surbhi and her friend Divya attend the party, and after Rishabh mocks Surbhi again for not drinking, she decides to drink to prove him wrong. Later, she falls ill and, while Rishabh is unaware, she ends up in his bedroom and falls asleep. He is surprised to find her in his room the next morning. In the present, Rishabh is hesitant to reveal his past connection with Surbhi to their families, particularly because his family is more traditional and he fears their disapproval.
| Episode 2 | Rishte Ka Evaluation (En: Due Diligence) |
In Mumbai, the sudden lockdown throws Surbhi and Rishabh into turmoil. Surbhi attempts to leave Rishabh's home but, upon a video call with her family, panics and lies, claiming to be at a female friend's house. Rishabh, on a call with his own family, also deceives them about being alone. Later, Rishabh encounters his neighbor in the lobby and learns of a grocery van downstairs, prompting him to arrange for groceries and a way for Surbhi to return to her hostel. In Ratlam, Rishabh texts Surbhi, expressing his surprise at seeing her as a potential marriage candidate while sharing a photo of his T-shirt. Flashing back in Mumbai, while Rishabh was downstairs, Surbhi decided to clean his house. While doing so, she got her clothes dirty and changed into Rishabh's clothes. While taking out the garbage from the party last night, she accidentally locked herself out. Meanwhile, the Gupta family eagerly prepares to visit the Rathis for an arranged marriage. Surbhi's brother, Shekhar, expresses concerns over their strict family dynamics, especially regarding Rishabh's aunt, Neeta. He asks his wife's uncle, who happens to be Neeta's neighbor, for information. Shortly before arriving at the Rathi's, the uncle reveals a past affair Neeta had with Mohit, leading to a forced marriage to Rajesh Jaiswal, which left Tauji resentful not for intercaste love, but for the dishonesty. Hearing this out, Surbhi is left tensed.
| Episode 3 | Jhooth (En: The Lie) |
In Mumbai, Rishabh finds himself locked out of his apartment and worries about his neighbor seeing Surbhi. He decides to call someone for a new key. While making the key, his watchman notices Surbhi at the staircase. He asks bribe from Rishabh to stay silent. Rishabh gets panicked and gets into an argument with Surbhi. Meanwhile, in Ratlam, the Gupta family visits the Rathi family, where Rajesh Jaiswal makes them uncomfortable. They discover both Rishabh and Surbhi enjoy maggi with sev, but they brush it off as a common trend online. In a flashback, Rishabh initially rudely offers Surbhi maggi, but after a moment of reflection, he apologizes and garnishes it with sev in his trademark style. They bond over personal stories and learn Surbhi is from nearby Ujjain. The next day, Rishabh bribes the watchman to spend time on the terrace with Surbhi where they discuss their goals, but the situation changes when they learn the keymaker has tested positive for COVID. In Ratlam, Surbhi joins the Rathi family at Shree Ganga sweets but feels the guilt of lying when Vivek gifts her a silver coin, representing the family's acceptance.
| Episode 4 | Positive or Negative |
In Mumbai, Rishab is scared to take a COVID test because he worries about getting exposed. He jokes about sneezing on Surbhi to make her cancel the appointment but accidentally sneezes on her instead. He quickly apologizes and agrees to take the test. Rishab learns the testing van will go to Churchgate, near Surbhi's hostel, and asks her to join them. Surbhi decides to stay with him until he gets his test results, offering care and support, which helps strengthen their bond. The next day Surbhi and Rishab wait anxiously for his report and when report comes out to be negative they become overjoyed and almost hug each other. In Ratlam, Rajesh Jaiswal sees Rishab and Surbhi holding hands during a family photo session, causing him to doubt Surbhi's intentions. Later, Rishab asks if he can join Surbhi as she visits a relative. He tries to propose her in the car, but Surbhi, still feeling emotionally weighed down for lying, changes the subject. Rishab later talks to his friend Monty about Surbhi's reaction. Monty suggests that holding hands without her consent might have upset her. Rishab quickly goes to see Surbhi, where she tells him she cannot marry based on a lie.
| Episode 5 | Kaafi Hai Na (En: It's Just Perfect) |
A year ago during Diwali, Tauji shared his business journey with Rishabh, emphasizing the importance of balancing progress with traditions and urging Rishabh to uphold family values when he moves to Mumbai. At present, in Ratlam, Rishabh explains to Surbhi that his traditional family will not understand their relationship, believing marriage is the best solution for them. In Mumbai, Surbhi's hostel arranges a car for her. She invites Rishab to see her off but is hesitant, fearing someone might see them but he still goes to see her off. Later, after finding one of Surbhi's earrings, Rishabh defies lockdown to return Surbhi's earring, and they share a kiss in her room. Rishab narrowly escapes from being caught by the guard, thanks to Divya. Their secret romance grew, but Rishab struggles to propose her due to the lockdown. As the lockdown ends, Rishabh plans to propose, but Surbhi does not show up, leaving him disheartened. In Ratlam, Tauji looks for another girl as a backup for Rishabh. Overhearing this, Rishabh proposes to Surbhi in Ujjain and convinces her to marry. Meanwhile, Rajesh Jaiswal attempts to conduct a background check on Surbhi through the hostel matron.
| Episode 6 | Nazar Na Lage (En: Touch Wood) |
In Ratlam, Tauji manages a legal issue involving Mohit, while Vivek shares with him that the Gupta's have accepted the marriage proposal. Rajesh informs Tauji that Surbhi's background check is approved, causing happiness in the family. A flashback reveals a matron warning Rajesh about his inquiries. He suggests asking the hostel peon about Surbhi, but this is dismissed by Taiji and Vivek. In Ujjain, wedding preparations commence, but Shekhar tries to cut costs due to financial strain from losing his job and Lalit's reduced salary. Ankur calls Rishabh, urging him to join Choco and Cinnamon, where he has been selected as a marketing executive, as soon as possible, as recruitment is becoming tougher due to COVID. Rajesh tells Tauji that he and Neeta will be late to the roka ceremony because they need to go to Mumbai. Tauji insists they stay at Rishabh's flat, which makes Rishabh bribe the watchman to keep quiet. In Mumbai, Rajesh feels pressure from a bank loan for his business and blames Rishabh for his problems. Neeta discovers a liquor bill from Rishabh's pre-lockdown party. She asks the watchman about the party and learns that a girl stayed at Rishabh's flat during the lockdown. She tells the watchman not to tell Rajesh, but Rajesh overhears her. During the Roka ceremony, Rishabh prepares a special song for Surbhi, where they dance together and then with their families. Rishabh promises Surbhi that he will always keep both their families happy, just like they are at the ceremony.
| Episode 7 | Code of Conduct |
The 'roka' ceremony is happening at the Gupta home, but Sapna is worried about Rajesh and Neeta not being there. Vivek calls Rajesh and learns he has an important obligation that keeps him from attending. In Mumbai, Rajesh visits Surbhi's hostel to find out more about an unknown girl. Neeta, who lost her phone to Rajesh, warns Rishabh using someone else's phone to deny any accusations. After the 'roka', the Rathi family picks a wedding date. Surbhi notices Rishabh is upset and tries to talk to him with help from Monty. Rishabh wants to share his feelings but ends up not telling her. Back at home, Rajesh confronts Rishabh about his parties and links him to Divya instead of Surbhi. Rishabh stays quiet, happy that Surbhi is safe from Rajesh's accusations. Later, Neeta confronts Rajesh, saying he only wanted to marry her for financial support from her family. Rajesh angrily points his finger at Neeta and Rishabh, accusing them of having no good character or morals. Shekhar's chachaji overhears this and tells Lalit, who then collapses.
| Episode 8 | Sach |
In Mumbai, a flashback shows Rishabh planning to propose to Surbhi, who is equally excited. Just as she leaves her hostel, she receives a call from Shekhar about her father's angina attack and rushes to Ujjain. In the present, Surbhi learns Lalit had a myocardial infarction and tries to reach Rishabh, but Aseem, who has Rishabh's phone, is hesitant to answer. Priya talks to Surbhi, who shares about Lalit's condition and says she knows what happened last night and wants to speak with Rishabh. The Rathi family decides to send Vivek and Sapna to check on Lalit, but Shekhar breaks off the alliance, prompting them to return home. Surbhi contacts Monty to find Rishabh. He informs Rishabh about the broken engagement and Lalit's heart attack, but Rishabh can't reach Surbhi as she is occupied with the doctor. Surbhi has a breakdown upon learning of the alliance's end. Rishabh sneaks out to Ujjain on Monty's bike. Lalit, regaining consciousness, advises Surbhi to end things with Rishabh, but she confesses the truth and her love for him. Lalit supports her. Rishabh calls Surbhi to meet at ghat and suggests they should end the alliance, but Surbhi confronts him, revealing she confessed the truth to their families that she was the one who stayed at Rishabh's flat and not Divya. They embrace as their families watch Surbhi's confession video.
| Episode 9 | Ratlam Junction |
Surbhi's family confronts her about a confession video, but Lalit stands up for her. Lalit tries to call Vivek, but he does not answer. Tauji, feeling embarrassed by gossip, agrees to a facade marriage suggested by Rajesh, even though Vivek, Sapna, and Taiji disagree. Vivek and Sapna visit Lalit in Ujjain but act cold towards Surbhi. They set November 4 as the wedding date, but Lalit asks to postpone it because Sumit has a visa interview on that day. Vivek invites everyone to Janmashtami celebrations. Later, Surbhi and Rishabh visit the temple and discuss the Rathi family's behavior and their future. Surbhi unknowingly professes her love for Rishabh. During Janmashtami, Tauji announces the unapproved wedding date of November 4. Rishabh tries to discuss it with Vivek and Sapna, but they avoid the topic, making him realize that his family wants to marry them just to save their reputation. Rishabh takes the family to a room under the pretense of a family photo. He confronts them about the marriage plans, standing up for Surbhi and he and Surbhi decide to cancel the wedding. Later, Neeta confronts Tauji about his strictness and past behavior, which leaves him upset. The Gupta family then leaves for Ujjain. During the Janmashtami prayers, Sapna and Vivek support Rishabh, who hugs Tauji, prompting Tauji to forgive him. Tauji also apologizes to Neeta. A few days later, Surbhi is on the train to Mumbai. At Ratlam Junction, she hears Rishabh looking for her in the coach. When she asks him why he is there, she sees Lalit and the Gupta family at the station, which shocks her. Later, the Rathi family joins them with a music band and asks for a second chance from Surbhi, which she accepts. Rishabh and Surbhi then board the train to Mumbai. In the post-credit scene, Rishabh receives a call from Ankur saying his job offer at Choco and Cinnamon is revoked because he could not join on time, leaving him upset, but Surbhi supports him.

== Cast ==
=== Main ===
- Ritik Ghanshani as Rishabh Rathi
- Ayesha Kaduskar as Surbhi Gupta

=== Recurring ===
- Kanwaljit Singh as Anand Rathi (Tauji)
- Alka Amin as Kusum Rathi (Taiji)
- Jameel Khan as Lalit Gupta: Surbhi's father
- Deepika Amin as Madhu Gupta: Surbhi's mother
- Rajesh Tailang as Rajesh Jaiswal
- Anjana Sukhani as Neeta Jaiswal
- Chaitrali Gupte as Sapna Rathi: Rishabh's mother
- Rajesh Jais as Vivek Rathi: Rishabh's father
- Gyanendra Tripathi as Shekhar Gupta: Surbhi's elder brother
- Priyamvada Kant as Pakhi Gupta: Surbhi's sister-in-law
- Saadhika Syal as Priya Rathi
- Omm Dubey as Aseem Rathi
- Pratish Mehta as Monty
- Sachin Viddrrohi as Champak
- Resham Sahani as Divya Singh
- Keshav Mehta as Ankur Trivedi
- Sameer Dharmadhikari as Mohit

=== Special appearance ===
- Jitendra Kumar as Sunny Khandelwal

== Music ==
The "Bada Naam Karenge" web series features an original soundtrack composed by Anurag Saikia and Avinash Chouhan. Released in 2025, the soundtrack is available as an EP containing four songs with a total duration of 12 minutes. The tracks are:-

- 'Bada Naam Karenge' as Title Track with Anurag Saikia and Nakul Chugh being its main artists and JUNO being its lyricist.
- 'Kaafi Hai Na' with Shreya Phukan as main artist, Anurag Saikia as composer and JUNO as lyricist.
- 'Aap Nazar Aaye' with Anurag Saikia and Nakul Chugh as main artists and JUNO as lyricist.
- 'Cheater Balma'
- 'Tu Sab Jaane Kanha'

The soundtrack has been praised for its composition and is recognized for its harmonious blend of traditional and modern sounds, effectively complementing the series' exploration of contemporary love within the framework of family and cultural values.

The original soundtrack of "Bada Naam Karenge" is accessible on various music platforms, including Spotify and Apple Music.

== Reception ==
Saibal Chatterjee of NDTV gave 2.5 stars and said "Bada Naam Karenge has avowedly big ambitions: with one foot firmly planted in the past, it strains at the leash for a dash into the future. But it has plasticine feet. The boundary it wants to push is in its sight but it never gets close enough to actually push it." Shubhra Gupta of The Indian Express gave 2 stars out of 5 and said that "Watching the new show run by Sooraj Barjatya is a conflicting business as it makes you wonder whether brief interlude of youthful freedom that keeps rearing its head every decade or so is an illusion." Devesh Sharma of Filmfare rated 3.5/5 stars and said "Bada Naam Karenge is a family drama revolving around a traditional engagement between a girl and a boy. It has all the values of a Barjatya product."
