= Lata Sabharwal =

Indian television actress

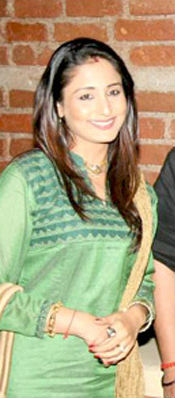
- Sabharwal in 2012
- Born: India
- Occupation: Actress
- Years active: 1999–2020
- Known for: Vivah; Yeh Rishta Kya Kehlata Hai; Yeh Rishtey Hain Pyaar Ke
- Spouse: Sanjeev Seth (m. 2009; sep. 2025)
- Children: 1

Lata Sabharwal is an Indian actress, who has worked in Hindi television and films. Sabharwal is best known for her portrayal of Rajshri Goyel Maheshwari in Star Plus's Yeh Rishta Kya Kehlata Hai and Yeh Rishtey Hain Pyaar Ke. She has also starred in successful television shows like Shaka Laka Boom Boom, Woh Rehne Waali Mehlon Ki as well as films like Vivah and Ishq Vishq.

== Personal life ==
In 2009, Sabharwal married fellow actor Sanjeev Seth from the show Yeh Rishta Kya Kehlata Hai. In 2013 she gave birth to a boy.

On 21 June 2025, Sabharwal announced separation from her husband on Instagram.

== Career ==
Sabharwal started her career in 1999 with Geeta Rahasya. She has played supporting roles in all three of her movies, among which Vivah has been her most successful movie to date. Besides acting in Bollywood movies, she has also acted in television series, among them Arzoo Hai Tu, Awaz - Dil Se Dil Tak, Jannat, Jhoot Bole Kauwa Kaate and Khushiyan. She usually plays supporting roles in Hindi television programmes. She was seen in Woh Rehne Waali Mehlon Ki, which aired on Sahara One channel. Then, she played the role of Sanju's mother in Shaka Laka Boom Boom. From 2007 to 2008, she played the role of Cynthia in Sahara One's Ghar Ek Sapnaa. In 2008, she appeared in Main Teri Parchhain Hoon on Imagine TV. This role got her fame in Indian Television. In 2007, she was seen in Naaginn, which aired on Zee TV, as Ratna, Triveni's daughter in law.

From 2009 to 2019, she played Rajshri Goyel Maheshwari, the mother of the main lead, Akshara, the grand mother of later main lead, Naira in Yeh Rishta Kya Kehlata Hai on Star Plus. The role brought her much recognition and fame. She won several awards in the category of Best Onscreen Mother. She married her on-screen husband from Yeh Rishta Kya Kehlata Hai, Sanjeev Seth. Lata and her husband, Sanjeev Seth, participated in the Star Plus dance show Nach Baliye 6 in 2013.

She reprised her role of Rajshri Goyel Maheshwari in Yeh Rishtey Hain Pyaar Ke, the spin-off series of Yeh Rishta Kya Kehlata Hai. She has played the role of Vasundhara Ranjeetpratap Singh in the Colors TV show Ishq Mein Marjawan. In 2021, she made an announcement about her decision to quit television.

== Television ==
Year	Serial	Role
	Zara Si Zindagi	
1999	Geeta Rahasya	Draupadi
2000	X Zone – 6 1/2	
2001–2002	Jannat	Naaz
2001–2002	Jai Mahabharat	Rajmata Kunti
2002	Kehta Hai Dil	Vikram's Wife
2002–2004	Shaka Laka Boom Boom	Sanju's mother
2002–2006	Aap Beeti	Story:Rajnigandha(2005), Story:Pukaar(2002)
2003	Raghu More: Bachelor of Hearts	
2003	Arzoo Hai Tu	Smita
2003–2004	Awaz – Dil Se Dil Tak	Lata Pramod Gupta
2003–2004	Jhoot Bole Kauwa Kaate	
2004	Devi	Kavita Sharma / Kavita Vasudev Kumar
2004	Dishayen	Reema
2004	Khushiyan	
2005	Anant	
2005–2006	Woh Rehne Waali Mehlon Ki	Shalini Mittal / Shalini Puneet Agarwal
2006	Apradhi Kaun	Dr. Julie
2007–2008	Naaginn	Ratna Vishnu Singh
2007–2009	Ghar Ek Sapnaa	Cynthia Rishabh Chaudhary
2008	C.I.D. – Kissa Bhatakti Aatma Ka	Ragini (Episode 534)
2008	C.I.D. – Kissa Bhatakti Aatma Ka	Mandy (Episode 534)
2008–2009	Main Teri Parchhain Hoon	Jaya Siddharth Tyagi
2009–2019	Yeh Rishta Kya Kehlata Hai	Rajshree Goyel Maheshwari
2013	Nach Baliye 6	Contestant
2017	Woh Apna Sa	Kalyani Amrish Jindal
2018–2019	Ishq Mein Marjawan	Vasundhara Ranjeetpratap Singh
2019–2020	Yeh Rishtey Hain Pyaar Ke	Rajshree Goyel Maheshwari

== Filmography ==
Year	Film	Role	Notes
2003	Ishq Vishk	Alisha's friend	
2006	Vivah	Bhavna	
2008	Konchem Koththaga	Seema Bheoroll	Telugu
2015	Prem Ratan Dhan Payo	Sangeeta Singh	Cameo Role
2023	The Rise of Sudarshan Chakra	Hero's Aunty	

== See also ==
List of Indian television actresses
