= Sangamarmar =

- Genre: Romantic; Drama
- Showrunner: Sooraj R. Barjatya
- Written by: Rajita Sharma
- Directed by: Vikram Ghai
- Starring: Saurabh Raj Jain; Sheen Dass; Smita Bansal; Avinash Wadhawan; Khalid Siddiqui
- Music by: Tyson Paul
- Composer: Tyson Paul
- Country of origin: India
- Original language: Hindi
- No. of seasons: 1
- No. of episodes: 45 (till date)

Production
- Executive producers: Priyanka Chaudhary; Tejkarran Singh Bajaj; Deepak Sharma; Devash S. Barjatya
- Producer: Jyoti Deshpande
- Cinematography: Dinesh Singh
- Editors: Janak Chauhan; Idrajeet Singh
- Running time: 20–25 minutes
- Production companies: Jio Studios; Rajshree Productions

Original release
- Network: JioHotstar
- Release: 26 February 2026 – present

Sangamarmar is a 2026 Indian Hindi-language Romantic drama TV series streaming on JioHotstar. It is directed by Vikram Ghai and produced by Jio Studios and Rajshree Productions. Sooraj R. Barjatya serves as the showrunner.

It stars Saurabh Raj Jain and Sheen Dass in the lead roles and was released on 26 February 2026 on Jio Hotstar.

== Cast ==
- Saurabh Raj Jain as Aditya
- Sheen Dass as Amrita Goel
- Ayushi Doegar as Nisha
- Sapna Chanana as Neeta Awasthi
- Smita Bansal
- Avinash Wadhawan
- Khalid Siddiqui
- Mehul Buch
- Jaya Ojha
- Aparna Askarkar Sharma
- Tapasya Nayak Srivastava as Aditya's elder sister
- Aniket N Narang
- Frooq Saeed
- Swati Tarar
- Pankhuri Gidwani
- Onaiza Sayyed
- Aarit Gupta
- Veda Agarwal

== Release ==
It was premiered on 26 February 2026 on Jio Hotstar. The official trailer was unveiled on 17 February 2026.

== Episodes ==
=== Series overview ===
Season	Episodes	Originally released	
Season	Episodes	First released	Network
1	45	February 26, 2026	JioHotstar

=== Season 1 (2026) ===
No. in season	Title	Directed by	Written by	Original release date
1	"Hamari Shadi Nahi Hui"	Vikram Ghai	Rajita Sharma	February 26, 2026
2	"Jo Raah Tune Chuni"	Vikram Ghai	Rajita Sharma	February 26, 2026
3	"Maiyya Ki Odhaniya"	Vikram Ghai	Rajita Sharma	February 26, 2026
4	"Ye Din Bhi Dhal Jaayenge"	Vikram Ghai	Rajita Sharma	February 26, 2026
5	"We Need You Papa"	Vikram Ghai	Rajita Sharma	February 26, 2026
6	"Beti Hokar..."	Vikram Ghai	Rajita Sharma	February 26, 2026
7	"Reham"	Vikram Ghai	Rajita Sharma	February 26, 2026
8	"Maan-Swabhimaan"	Vikram Ghai	Rajita Sharma	February 26, 2026
9	"Seekh Jaungi!"	Vikram Ghai	Rajita Sharma	February 26, 2026
10	"Jahan Kheli Gudiya Khilaune"	Vikram Ghai	Rajita Sharma	March 5, 2026
11	"Uss Raha Par Badhte Jana Hai"	Vikram Ghai	Rajita Sharma	March 5, 2026
12	"Kaise Nibhau Pyaar Tera"	Vikram Ghai	Rajita Sharma	March 5, 2026
13	"Yeh Raah Nahi Asaan"	Vikram Ghai	Rajita Sharma	March 5, 2026
14	"Shaadi Kar Lete Hain"	Vikram Ghai	Rajita Sharma	March 12, 2026
15	"Adjustment Ya Compromise"	Vikram Ghai	Rajita Sharma	March 12, 2026
16	"Ek Vichitra Shaadi"	Vikram Ghai	Rajita Sharma	March 12, 2026
17	"Kashmakash"	Vikram Ghai	Rajita Sharma	March 12, 2026
18	"Laate Ho Pyaar Kahan Se"	Vikram Ghai	Rajita Sharma	March 19, 2026
19	"Aazad Kar Diya"	Vikram Ghai	Rajita Sharma	March 19, 2026
20	"Shart"	Vikram Ghai	Rajita Sharma	March 19, 2026
21	"Consultation Fees"	Vikram Ghai	Rajita Sharma	March 19, 2026
22	"Shuruat"	Vikram Ghai	Rajita Sharma	March 26, 2026
23	"Tu Door Nazar Aaye"	Vikram Ghai	Rajita Sharma	March 26, 2026
24	"Happy Birthday"	Vikram Ghai	Rajita Sharma	March 26, 2026
25	"Chot"	Vikram Ghai	Rajita Sharma	March 26, 2026
26	"Bharat Ki Beti"	Vikram Ghai	Rajita Sharma	April 2, 2026
27	"Khoya-Paya"	Vikram Ghai	Rajita Sharma	April 2, 2026
28	"Akeli Hoon Kamzor Nahi"	Vikram Ghai	Rajita Sharma	April 2, 2026
29	"Kasak"	Vikram Ghai	Rajita Sharma	April 2, 2026
30	"Faisla"	Vikram Ghai	Rajita Sharma	April 9, 2026
31	"Woh Wali Train"	Vikram Ghai	Rajita Sharma	April 9, 2026
32	"Harzana"	Vikram Ghai	Rajita Sharma	April 9, 2026
33	"Yaar Hai Uska"	Vikram Ghai	Rajita Sharma	April 9, 2026
34	"Friend ya Boyfriend"	Vikram Ghai	Rajita Sharma	April 16, 2026
35	"Jaanane Laga Hoon"	Vikram Ghai	Rajita Sharma	April 16, 2026
36	"Tofha"	Vikram Ghai	Rajita Sharma	April 16, 2026
37	"Shaq ya Jhooth"	Vikram Ghai	Rajita Sharma	April 16, 2026
38	"Saazish"	Vikram Ghai	Rajita Sharma	April 23, 2026
39	"Aap Beeti"	Vikram Ghai	Rajita Sharma	April 23, 2026
40	"Main Maiyya Hoon Teri"	Vikram Ghai	Rajita Sharma	April 23, 2026
41	"Legal Notice"	Vikram Ghai	Rajita Sharma	April 23, 2026
42	"Dooriyan"	Vikram Ghai	Rajita Sharma	April 30, 2026
43	"Madam Ji"	Vikram Ghai	Rajita Sharma	April 30, 2026
44	"Happy Rakhi"	Vikram Ghai	Rajita Sharma	April 30, 2026
45	"Daayra"	Vikram Ghai	Rajita Sharma	April 30, 2026

== Reception ==
Archika Khurana of The Times of India gave 2.5 stars out of 5 and said that "Sangamarmar is neither daring enough to challenge its own conventions nor regressive enough to fully embrace melodrama as spectacle. What remains is a handsomely mounted yet dramatically inert saga stretched thin across episodes." Siddartha Toleti of M9 News stated that it is "A Fluffy, Soulless Romance."
