= Do Hanson Ka Jodaa =

Indian drama television series

- Intertitle
- Genre: Soap opera
- Created by: Sooraj Barjatya
- Written by: Zama Habib
- Directed by: Kaushik Ghatak
- Starring: See Below
- Opening theme: "Do Hanson ka Jodaa" by Alka Yagnik
- Country of origin: India
- Original language: Hindi
- No. of episodes: 161

Production
- Producers: Sooraj Barjatya; Suryakant Pareek
- Running time: 24 minutes
- Production company: Rajshri Productions

Original release
- Network: NDTV Imagine
- Release: 18 January – 9 September 2010

Do Hanson Ka Joda is a soap opera that aired on NDTV Imagine from 18 January to 9 September 2010. This show is the based on 2008 Hindi-language film Rab Ne Bana Di Jodi, while lyricist Raghvendra Singh is the creative director in this serial.

== Plot ==
Do Hanson Ka Joda is the story of Preeti, a young dreamy girl who wants to marry a Bollywood "Prince Charming". However, in a turn of events, she marries Suryakamal, an ordinary middle-class man. Her bubbly cousin Sumi, on the other hand, marries the handsome Rishi. Both the girls find their marriage to be not what it seems as Preeti realises what a loving husband Suryakamal is, while Sumi is regularly assaulted by her violent husband Rishi.

After Preeti and Suryakamal pay a visit to his aunt and begin their romantic journey together, both the girls have to urgently return to their maternal house as Preeti's father leaves the family due to Chachi Ji's cunning plans. Radhika urges Vijay to see Chachi Ji's reality, but in turn is insulted and has to leave herself. As Suryakamal's stepmother passes away, Suryakamal promises her he will unite the family.

Meanwhile, Suryakamal's sister Sajni had an earlier pending operation, which now succeeds. Preeti and Suryakamal soon find out about Rishi and get him arrested. Sumi now begins to live with them.

Preeti finds an opportunity to enter into a dance competition with Pushkar, and after much reluctance, Suryakamal ends up dancing with her in the finale and they win the competition. Sajni is about to marry Pushkar, when Chunni and Suryakamal find his violent truth out and stop the marriage.

Further, the plot develops into Suryakamal's selfish family where a property dispute emerges as Preeti's brother-in-law Neeraj is charged by Ritu for domestic violence. He reveals that the property in fact belongs to Chunni, due to which they - mainly Ammaji, and Ritu - plot against Preeti. Suryakamal learns of this, but they murder him and hide his body so no one can know the truth. Preeti is devastated by his disappearance and tortured by her in-laws, but soon runs into a con man who is a lookalike of Suryakamal - Chandar. He is mistaken for Suryakamal, and later finds out his lookalike's truth, revealing that Suryakamal has in fact died. Ritu and Ammaji discover this and frames Chandar for Suryakamal's murder, but it is proved otherwise. During the investigation, Preeti's dead body is found as part of a conspiracy to get her property, but fail as their plans are foiled and the truth is unveiled.

The end shows Preeti and Suryakamal's ashes being submerged together.

== Cast ==
- Shubhangi Atre as Preeti

She is a 22-year-old girl who lives in the world of dreams. She dreams that one day her knight in shining armor will lift her up in his arms and take her away with him to the land of dreams. She adores films especially the soft romance types. Preeti has not yet realized the harsh realities of life and for her everything is like what it is in films. This soft-spoken-bubbly lass is not only the apple of her parents eyes but is loved by all. Apart from being a dutiful daughter she is very innocent pure at heart. She hails from an upper-middle-class family of Vrindavan. She is traditional at heart.

- Shaleen Bhanot as Suryakamal: Suryakamal is the male lead of the show and plays Preeti's husband. He is a very innocent, humble and down to earth man. Along with being a very hard working, he lives his life with very strong values. He is not visually appealing but has a heart of Gold. Due to a severe sinus problem he sneezes continuously (and for all you know wears a wig, too!). When nervous he starts to speak in monosyllables.
- Nivaan Sen as Neeraj: Younger brother of Suryakamal and husband of Ritu. He is very close to his mother and respectful to Suryakamal. He studies in Delhi and lives there in a hostel.
- Ali Merchant as Rishi: Hailing from a business class family, he is a 24- or 25-year-old good-looking spoilt brat. Turning a blind eye towards the harsh realities of life, he harbours a very carefree attitude towards life and for him life is all about enjoying, partying and having fun. Rishi is an atheist and does not believe in rituals and traditions. He has taken completely after his father and the motto of his life is "Live Life Kingsize." He is a wife-beater and beats Sumi mercilessly. He even asked Sumi to seduce a tycoon in the show so as to boost his business.
- Nupur Joshi as Sumi: An action films lover Sumi, also cousin of Preeti is a best friend of her too...She is married to Rishi. She faces many problems due to her marriage.
- Reema Lagoo as Snehlata: She is like the ‘Devi’ in the house where everyone worships her. All her decisions are accepted with no questions asked. She is a very Godly person and believes in Krishnaji and she knows that he plays a very big role in helping her make her choices and decisions. She is suffering from a terminal disease but it never shows in her attitude as she is always very positive. She died in the show.
- Sikandar Kharbanda as Lucky Kapoor
- Palak Jain as Sajni
- Gulfam Khan as Ammaji: She is the head of the family
- Vindhya Tiwari as Meera, a simple, widowed village girl
- Vineet Raina as Vinay
- Sonica Handa as Radhika
- Praneeta Sahu as Ritu
- Prithvi Zutshi as Preeti's father
- Pankaj Berry as Gajendra
- Niyati Joshi as Rishi's mother
- Bikramjeet Kanwarpal as Rishi's father
- Alihassan Turabi as Dwarka Thakur
- Kuldeep Mallik as Sumi's father
