= Arzoo Hai Tu =

- Genre: Drama
- Written by: Dr Nameeta Sharma, Jitendra gupta, mahipal saini
- Starring: see below
- Theme music composer: Shankar–Ehsaan–Loy
- Opening theme: "Arzoo Hai Tu" by Shankar Mahadevan
- Country of origin: India
- Original language: Hindi
- No. of seasons: 1
- No. of episodes: 180

Production
- Executive producer: Jyoti Sagar
- Producers: Subhash Sagar; Prem Sagar
- Camera setup: Multi-camera
- Running time: Approx. 25 minutes
- Production companies: Sagar Arts Limited; Sahara India Mass Communication

Original release
- Network: Sahara One
- Release: 1 September 2003

Arzoo Hai Tu (transl. You are the desire) is an Indian television series produced by Ramanand Sagar of Sagar Arts Limited, which aired on Sahara One channel. The series premiered on 1 September 2003.

== Cast ==
- Mohnish Behl as Akash
- Aman Verma as Ajay
- Mrinal Kulkarni as Sandhya
- Lata Sabharwal as Smita
- Uday Tikekar as Satish
- Sheetal Thakkar as Vineeta
- Sudha Shivpuri as Sushma
- Sanober Kabir
