= Samrat & Co. =

2014 film by Kaushik Ghatak

- Theatrical release poster
- Directed by: Kaushik Ghatak
- Written by: Kaushik Ghatak; Manish Srivastav
- Produced by: Kavita K. Barjatya; Rajshri Productions
- Starring: Rajeev Khandelwal; Madalsa Sharma Chakraborty; Gopal Datt
- Cinematography: Sanjay Malwankar
- Edited by: Nipun Gupta
- Music by: Ankit Tiwari; Mithoon; GAP
- Production company: Rajshri Productions
- Distributed by: Rajshri Productions
- Release date: 25 April 2014
- Country: India
- Language: Hindi

Samrat & Co. is a 2014 Indian Hindi-language detective thriller film directed by Kaushik Ghatak and produced by Kavita K. Barjatya under the banner of Rajshri Productions. It features Rajeev Khandelwal in the title role of Samrat. The film was initially scheduled for release on 1 May 2014 release but was released ahead of schedule on 25 April 2014.

== Plot ==
Dimpy Singh (Madalsa Sharma Chakraborty), approaches Samrat Tilakdhari (Rajeev Khandelwal), a private investigator, with a strange case. Their garden was ruined for unknown, but apparently natural reasons; leading horticulturists have examined the fading plants but they have not been able to identify the probable reason. Further, her father's favorite horse died prematurely; once again the cause is unknown. Furthermore, the health of Dimpy's father Mahendra Pratap Singh (Girish Karnad), otherwise a strong and balanced man, has deteriorated. These possibly related problems prompt Samrat's curiosity.

Samrat along with his assistant friend, Chakradhar Pandey (Gopal Datt), visits the huge estate of Mahendra Pratap Singh. As he starts investigating, he discovers many mysterious facts. The story progresses when a murder takes place in the house, which leads to a series of events, complicating things for Samrat. Every character around seems to be hiding something. Then Anuj is found killed.

Dimpy is stuck in a brakeless car when Samrat saves her life. Doubt hovers around Mrs. Dave as Samrat learns she is a college friend of Mahendra Pratap. But she is innocent as she played pranks on Mahendra just as a sweet revenge for his college days. She reveals a college secret to Samrat: She had broken her legs due to a small prank played by Mahendra in their college days. And she proves her innocence.

Samrat then focuses on other characters. Sanjay is the killer. He is son of Mahendra Pratap's first wife and wanted to revenge his father as he holds his father responsible for his mother's death.

== Cast ==
- Rajeev Khandelwal as Samrat Tilakdhari
- Madalsa Sharma Chakraborty as Dimpy Singh
- Rajneesh Duggal as Deepak Khurana
- Priyanshu Chatterjee as Sanjay Kumar Singh
- Gopal Datt as Chakradhar Pandey
- Girish Karnad as Mahendra Pratap Singh
- Sujata Sanghmitra as Sunita Singh
- Shreya Narayan as Divya Singh
- Indraneil Sengupta as Vijay Singh
- Barkha Sengupta as Revati Singh
- Ravi Jhankal as Puran Kaka
- Puja Gupta as Shanti
- Navin Prabhakar as Hari
- Bhaumik Sampat as Inspector Khalid
- Pradeep Welankar as DGP Arjun
- Smita Jaykar as Narayani Dave
- Deepak Shroff as Kishor Dave
- Ramgopal Bajaj as Satyadev Baba
- Anurag Jha as Ghanshyam
- Ajay Bhandari as Anuj
- Gufi Paintal as Dinesh Das (DD)
- Kabir Chopra as Vikramjeet
- Shakti Mohan in a dance number-Tequila Wakila

== Soundtrack ==
Samrat & Co.

Soundtrack album by Mithoon, Ankit Tiwari & GAP (Gopal, Anand, Pavan)
- Released: 19 March 2014
- Genre: Feature film soundtrack
- Length: 23:05
- Language: Hindi
- Label: Rajshri
External audio
- Audio Jukebox on YouTube

No.	Title	Lyrics	Music	Singer(s)	Length
1.	"Shukr Tera"	Mithoon	Mithoon	Chinmayi Sripada, Arijit Singh	5:57
2.	"Tequila Wakila"	Sanjay Masoomm	Ankit Tiwari	Ankit Tiwari, Shreya Ghoshal	4:05
3.	"Samrat & Co"	Gopal Dutt	GAP	Benny Dayal	3:11
4.	"Sawaloon Mein"	Sandeep Nath	Ankit Tiwari	Shreya Ghoshal	4:47
5.	"O Hum Navaa"	Mithoon	Mithoon	Gajendra Verma, Mithoon, Chinmayi Sripada	4:55

== Production ==
Known for his strong acting histrionics and intelligence, Rajeev Khandelwal's suave and new look as Samrat and his dialogue delivery is also being immensely appreciated, bringing the actor into a new avatar in Bollywood". Strangely, when the director of the film narrated Rajeev Khandelwal the script, he did not narrate the entire script, but did it only till the climax scene. The director Kaushik Ghatak told Rajeev that he would tell him the climax only if he came on board. Once Rajeev agreed to do the film, Kaushik kept his promise of narrating the climax to him, but, to his surprise, Rajeev did not want to hear it and requested him not to. Telling us his reasons for doing that, Rajeev said, "The script had been so gripping that I decided to play Samrat in my head, trying to actually solve the case while shooting the film.".

== Reception ==
Official theatrical trailer was released on 18 March 2014 at a suburban multiplex in Mumbai. The trailer received mixed reviews. One review said: Rajeev Khandelwal the main protagonist for Samrat & Co. very happily copies Benedict Cumberbatch, the British actor portraying the character of Sherlock Holmes in the hit series by the same name. Rajeev is desperately trying to be cool and stylish, something that does not come naturally to him and does not look good on him. Another review said: "The industry and fans by large, have found the trailer gripping and true to its claims of the film being ‘dilchasp’ and intriguing. Samrat and Co. received mostly negative reviews. Shubhra Gupta from the Indian Express rated the movie 1 star out of 5 and said "The script allows for lots of silliness, and clueless characters, and sad clues." Rediff gave half star to the movie. Rahul Desai from Mumbai mirror gave 1.5 stars out of 5. Taran Adarsh rated the movie 2.5 out of 5. The movie was released in 566 theaters.

It had a Poor Box Office collection record merely collecting 20 million in its run.
