= Pyaar Ke Do Naam: Ek Raadha, Ek Shyaam =

- Genre: Romance drama
- Created by: Kavita K. Barjatya
- Written by: Shashi Mittal; Sumeet Mittal; Zama Habib; Akashaditya Lama
- Directed by: Kaushik Ghatak; Saagar Kagra
- Creative director: Gayatri Singh
- Starring: See below
- Theme music composer: Dipti Mishra; Manish Tripathi
- Opening theme: "Pyaar Ke Do Naam" by Udit Narayan and Madhushree
- Country of origin: India
- Original language: Hindi
- No. of seasons: 2
- No. of episodes: 103

Production
- Producers: Kavita K. Barjatya; Sooraj Barjatya
- Editor: Santosh Singh
- Camera setup: Multi-camera
- Running time: Approx. 24 minutes
- Production company: Rajshri Productions

Original release
- Network: StarPlus
- Release: 3 April – 28 September 2006

Pyaar Ke Do Naam: Ek Raadha, Ek Shyaam is an Indian romance drama television series that premiered on 3 April 2006. The series was produced by Rajshri Productions and starred Barkha Bisht and Indraneil Sengupta.

The story focuses on the concept of reincarnation and how everlasting love lasts between Radha and Shyam.

== Plot ==
The story follows the reincarnating lives of a couple through three different generations. It opens with young students Radha, a simple girl aspiring to be a doctor, and Shyam, a playboy in the school. Initially, they dislike each other, but gradually begin to spend more time together and destiny makes them fall in love.

When Shyam visits a remote village Lakhanpur, it reminds him of his past life as Kishan, whereas Radha was Shyama. Due to a conflict in their village created by goons, Shyama jumps off a cliff and dies. When Kishan learns of this, he also commits suicide.

Back in the present, Radha and Shyam unite, but find out their families hate each other. A community conflict orders them to be killed.

The two are reborn again in the future as Radhika and Krishna, and again strive to be united in love as one.

== Cast ==
=== Main ===
- Barkha Sengupta as
  - Shyama
  - Radha Sharma
  - Radhika Rana
- Indraneil Sengupta as
  - Kishan
  - Shyam Sahay
  - Krishna (Krish) Singh Rathore

=== Recurring ===
- Muskaan Mihani as Mala
- Ramesh Deo as Dada Thakur
- Sonali Khare as Kaveri Sharma: Radha's elder sister
- Rakesh Pandey as Brijkishore Sharma: Radha and Kaveri's father
- Satyajit Sharma as Mr. Sahay: Shyam's father
- Sadhana Singh as Mamata Sahay: Shyam's mother
- Tabassum as Kishan's grandmother
- Shweta Gulati as Tanya
- Karishma Tanna as Jitisha Agarwal
- Amrapali Gupta as Ginno
- Sangram Singh as Rohit
- Rucha Gujarathi as Mahalakshmi
- Tarun Khanna as Ajay Singh Rathore
- Mukesh Khanna as Gajendra Singh Rathore
- Shiv Subramaniam as Vikrantraj Rana
- Sandeep Bhansali as Thakur
- Sooraj Thapar as Mr. Agarwal
- Sachin Sharma as Rohit Verma
- Bhumika Sharma as small kid
- Lakshya Sharma as small kid
