= Woh Rehne Waali Mehlon Ki =

Indian drama television series

- Written by: Shashi Mittal; Sumeet Hukamchand Mittal
- Directed by: Kaushik Ghatak; Ravi Raj; Sujeet Singh; Vikram Ghai; Nishchal Shome; Irfan Shaikh
- Creative director: Raghvendra Singh
- Starring: See below
- Opening theme: Woh Rehne Waali Mehlon Ki - Udit Narayan
- Country of origin: India
- Original language: Hindi
- No. of seasons: 3
- No. of episodes: 1,387

Production
- Producer: Kavita K. Barjatya
- Running time: 25 minutes
- Production company: Rajshri Productions

Original release
- Network: Sahara One
- Release: 30 May 2005 – 20 January 2011

Woh Rehne Waali Mehlon Ki (transl. She Who Lives in a Palace) is an Indian Hindi-language television series that aired on Sahara One channel. The series ran from 30 May 2005 and ended on 20 January 2011. It became the longest running television production of Rajshri Productions.

== Plot ==
The successful show ran for five years. During the first year of the show's run, the protagonist is Rani Mittal (Reena Kapoor), a rich girl who gets married into a poor family and learns to adjust to lower middle class life. After the death of her first husband Raj Goel, her family gets her married to his rich look-alike Prince Thapar.

20 Years later

During the second year of the show's run, after the deaths of Rani and Prince, their daughter Pari Thapar becomes the show's protagonist. Pari looks exactly like her mother. The show focuses on Pari's life, her first crush in college, her marriage to her soul-mate Saumya Parashar (Aamir Ali), and the many obstacles she has to face during her married life. Saumya dies after falling from a cliff, trying to save his cousin Sameer (Vikram Acharya). Pari, who is pregnant at that time, soon goes into labour. Dr. Manav Kumar, a famous obstetrician, supervises her delivery. Coincidentally, Manav's wife, Pallavi, also delivers a baby boy on the same day, and her delivery is overseen by Manav's friend Dr. Saurav. Pallavi dies in childbirth, and Pari's newborn son dies, too. In order to save Pari from another shock, so soon after losing her husband, Manav selflessly hands over his son to her. Pari assumes that the baby is her own son, and brings him up. The child is named Shubham. In time, Dr. Manav begins to miss his son and often finds excuses to meet him. When Pari and her family object to this, Manav attempts suicide in a fit of depression. He survives but loses his balance of mind. Dr. Saurav tells Pari the truth about the exchange of babies in the hospital. She then decides to bring Manav and Shubham together. Pari marries Manav and nurses him back to his senses. Pari and Manav live happily with Shubham and also adopt a little orphan girl named Rani. A freak accident at school causes Rani to lose her eyesight and Manav and Pari take care of her. One day Pari has an accident, which leads to serious health complications. She realises that she is dying and donates her eyes to Rani.

15 Years later

Both Manav and Pari are dead, and their children Shubham and Rani are both doctors. Rani marries Rishabh (Karan Grover), the son of an aristocratic family only to realise that Rishabh and his brothers have lost all their wealth. They live in a rundown house and constantly quarrel. Rishabh has no proper education and is indifferent to his wife. With great courage and patience, Rani sets about reforming her marital family and restoring order to their home. Encouraged by her, Rishabh takes up a job. Slowly, love blossoms between the couple. Eventually they regain their inheritance and move into their grand ancestral house. However, their happiness is short-lived, as Rishabh and his brothers die in a tragic accident. Rani is left to fend for herself, her three widowed sisters-in-law, a blind uncle-in-law and two small children of Rishabh's brothers.

Rani and her family move to Mumbai. After many hardships, Rani and her sisters-in-law get re-married. Rani's new husband, also named Rishabh (Sameer Sharma), is a wealthy businessman. Rani's new life with Rishabh and his large joint family is not easy. She faces many hurdles and goes through testing times. All ends well and Rani lives happily with her family.

== Cast ==
- Reena Kapoor as
  - Rani Mittal / Rani Raj Goel / Rani Prince Thapar: Yashvardhan's third daughter; Raj's widow; Prince's wife; Aditya and Pari's mother; Khushi's stepmother (2005–2006) (Dead)
  - Pari Thapar / Pari Saumya Parashar / Pari Manav Kumar: Rani and Prince's daughter; Aditya's younger sister; Khushi's elder stepsister; Rohit's ex–girlfriend; Saumya's widow; Dr. Manav's wife; Shubham's stepmother; Dr. Rani's mother (2006–2008) (Dead)
  - Dr. Rani Kumar / Dr. Rani Rishabh Rathore / Dr. Rani Rishabh Johri: Pari and Dr. Manav's daughter; Shubham's younger sister; Rishabh's widow; Rishabh Johri's wife (2008–2011)
- Alok Nath as Yashvardhan Mittal, Rani's father
- Lata Sabharwal as Shalini Mittal / Shalini Puneet Agarwal
- Anupam Bhattacharya as Puneet Agarwal
- Arjun Punj as
  - Raj Goel: Surekha and Rajendra's younger son; Manoj's younger brother; Shalini's elder brother; Rani's ex–husband; Shilpa's ex–boyfriend (2005) (Dead)
  - Prince Thapar: Jamnadas's son; Sheena's stepson; Tanya's elder stepbrother; Rani's widower; Neha's husband; Aditya, Pari and Khushi's father (2005–2006) (Dead)
- Prashant Bhatt as Manoj Goel
- Resham Tipnis as Aarati Manoj Goel
- Aanjjan Srivastav as Rajendra Goel (2005–2006) (Dead)
- Shagufta Ali as Surekha Rajendra Goel "Danima" (2005–2008) (Dead)
- Kashif Khan as
  - Raj Goel (2005) (Dead)
  - Prince Thapar (2005) (Dead)
- Khyaati Khandke Keswani as Neha Prince Thapar
- Supriya Karnik as
  - Sheena Jamnadas Thapar (2006)
  - Mohini Johri (2010–2011)
- Anang Desai as Jamnadas (JD) Thapar
- Amrapali Gupta as Tanya Thapar
- Rushad Rana as Karan
- Gulrez Khan as Shilpa
- Karuna Pandey as Madhu
- Madhumalati Kapoor as Mai
- Gaurav Gera as Deepak, Aarati's brother
- Manini Mishra as Sarala, Deepak's wife
- Aanchal Anand as Saloni Goel, Raj's Younger Sister
- Mehul Nisar as Saloni's Husband
- Tushar Dalvi as Rani's Eldest Brother-In-Law
- Rupini as Sheetal Mittal, Rani's elder sister
- Saurabh Dubey as Harikishan
- Ritu Vashisht as Komal Mittal / Jindal / Malhotra
- Aamir Ali as Saumya Parashar (2006–2007) (Dead)
- Kanika Kohli as Khushi Thapar / Khushi Rohit Mehra
- Madhavi Gogate as Raksha Surendra Mehra (2006–2007) (Dead)
- Susheel Parashar as Surendra Mehra
- Ankur Nayyar as Rohit Mehra, Khushi's husband
- Ira Soni as Riya Mehra
- Gayatri Choudhari as Ishaana Parashar / Ishaana Aditya Thapar
- Hemant Thatte as Aditya "Aryan" Thapar, Ishana's husband
- Sonia Rakkar as Neha Prince Thapar
- Arun Bali / S. M. Zaheer as Vikrantraj Parashar (2006–2007) / (2007) (Dead)
- Nimai Bali as Abhay Parashar
- Kamya Panjabi as Kamya Abhay Parashar
- Vikram Acharya as Sameer Parashar
- Usha Bachani as Shelly Vijay Parashar
- Nisha Sareen as Alisha Sameer Parashar
- Sanjeev Seth as Abhay Parashar
- Krutika Desai Khan as Kamya Abhay Parashar
- Supriya Shukla as Nirmala Sanjay Parashar
- Rajesh Balwani as Sanjay Parashar
- Baby Farida as Mrs. Parashar (Saumya's Grandmother & Pari's Grandmother-in-law) (2007) (Dead)
- Pramatesh Mehta as Gyanprakash Gupta (Sanjana's Father)
- Rekha Rao as Sulochana Gyanprakash Gupta (Sanjana's Mother)
- Poonam Joshi as Sanjana Gupta, Saumya's friend who he has an affair with
- Jaya Bhattacharya as Savitri
- Smita Singh as Chameli
- Tiya Gandwani as Mahika
- Shital Thakkar as Pallavi Manav Kumar (2007) (Dead)
- Vinay Jain as Dr. Manav Kumar (2007–2008) (Dead)
- Snehal Sahay as Dolly Kumar
- Rahul Nanda as Rakshit "Raxy"
- Parul Chauhan as Tina
- Rakesh Paul as Devprakash "DP" Kumar
- Pubali Sanyal as Jyoti Devprakash Kumar
- Badrul Islam as Rangeela
- Surendra Pal as Guruji
- Neelam Mehra as Damyanti Kumar
- Amita Nangia as Mahika's Mother
- Harsh Vashisht as Himesh
- Indu Verma as Jitisha
- Puneet Vashisht as Manav Sahni
- Arup Pal as Roshan Khanna
- Madhuri Dikshit as Buaji
- Dinesh Thakkar as Raghu
- Sameer Chandra as Gopal
- Abhay Bhargava as Advocate Bajaj
- Shiv Kumar Verma as Mr. Kothari
- Faisal Sayed as Abhijeet Singhania
- Rudra Kaushish as Yash Singhania
- Shweta Rastogi as Jaylakshmi
- Neha Janpandit as Dr. Rani Kumar / Dr. Rani Rishabh Rathore (2008)
- Manoj Bidwai as Shubham Kumar, Manav's son
- Karan Grover as Rishabh Rathore, Rani's first husband and an aristocrat (2008–2009) (Dead)
- Faizal Gazi as Varun Rathore (Dead)
- Neha Desai as Payal Varun Rathore / Payal Shekhar Agarwal
- Akhil Ghai as Virat Rathore (Dead)
- Poonam Gulati as Kamini Virat Rathore
- Aditya Sharma as Laddoo Rathore
- Aliraza Namdar as Harishchandra Rathore
- Renuka Bondre as Lilavati Harishchandra Rathore
- Yashodhan Rana as Dharam Rathore (Dead)
- Bhairavi Raichura as
  - Janaki Dharam Rathore (Dead)
  - Menaka
- Parth Mehrotra as Jay Rathore (Dead)
- Preeti Chaudhary as Rajani Jay Rathore / Rajani Deven Sharma
- Sameer Sharma as Rishabh Johri, Dr. Rani Kumar's second husband (2009–2011)
- Abir Goswami as Akash Johri
- Ridheema Tiwari as Ayesha Johri
- Amit Singh Thakur as Pradeep Johri
- Suhasini Mulay as Nirmala Johri
- Guddi Maruti as Sweeti Johri
- Nirmal Soni as Sweeti's husband
- Vaquar Shaikh as Shekhar Agarwal
- Rita Bhaduri as Dadisa
- Neelam Mehra as Mrs. Sharma
- Anirudh Dave as Deven "Dev" Sharma
- Rajlakshmi Solanki as Mrs. Agarwal
- Pooja Verma as Chhavi Agarwal
- Nikhil Sahni as Raunak Agarwal
- Prinal Oberoi as Jaya
- Sheetal Maulik as Dimple
- Aamir Dalvi as Jeet
- Sonia Singh as Anjali
- Karishma Randhawa as Priya

== Awards and nominations ==
=== Kalakaar Awards ===
Year	Category	Show	Character	Actor	Result
2005	Best Actress	Woh Rehne Waali Mehlon Ki	Rani Mittal	Reena Kapoor	Won

=== Apsara Film Producers Guild Awards ===
Year	Category	Show	Character	Actor	Result
2010	Best Actress-TV	Woh Rehne Waali Mehlon Ki	Rani Mittal	Reena Kapoor	Nominated

=== Indian Telly Awards ===
Year	Category	Show	Character	Actor	Result
2007	Fresh New Face (Female)	Woh Rehne Waali Mehlon Ki	Rani Mittal	Reena Kapoor	Nominated
