= Main Teri Parchhain Hoon =

- Genre: Drama
- Created by: Rajshri Productions
- Presented by: NDTV Group (earlier) and (now) by Dangal Tv
- Starring: See below
- Opening theme: "Main Teri Parchhain Hoon" by Madhushree
- Country of origin: India
- Original language: Hindi
- No. of episodes: 212

Production
- Producer: Kavita K. Barjatya
- Running time: 22 minutes

Original release
- Network: NDTV Imagine
- Release: 21 January 2008 – 12 February 2009

Main Teri Parchhain Hoon is an Indian soap opera produced by Rajshri Productions. It aired on NDTV Imagine between 21 January 2008 and 12 February 2009. The series was rebroadcast on Dangal TV beginning on 8 March 2021.

== Plot ==
Aanchal lives with her aunt and uncle, and dreams of becoming a fashion designer. Jaya is a devoted wife and mother who loves her husband, Siddharth, and their three children, Ayush, Juhi, and Sachin. Jaya visits her maternal home in Mumbai, promising to return soon. She and Aanchal meet at the bus station, and she gives Aanchal her ticket so Aanchal can make an interview on time. Jaya's bus falls off a cliff; she dies, and her family is heartbroken.

Aanchal gets a job as a fashion designer, but feels guilty when she hears about Jaya's death. Siddharth wants to keep Jaya's death from his children, but Ayush finds out and hides the news from his siblings to protect them.

Siddharth goes into seclusion. Juhi and Sachin miss their mother, and decide to go to Mumbai and see her; Ayush joins them. On the bus, the conductor orders the children off because they do not have tickets. Aanchal, who is on the bus, tells him that she is the children's mother. The bus stops; Aanchal feeds the children, and gets to know them. When she asks about their mother, Ayush says that she is in Mumbai. Aanchal tells them to return home because their father will be worried, and she brings them back. Siddharth is looking for the children, but Aanchal meets the other family members. Siddharth's father tells her that the children do not yet know that their mother is dead.

He is looking for a tutor for the children, and Aanchal volunteers; the children reluctantly agree. Juhi and Sachin learn that their mother is dead, but Siddharth calms them. Aanchal becomes closer to the children as she tutors them. They begin to like her, especially Sachin. Siddharth and Aanchal meet, and Aanchal introduces herself as the children's tutor. Siddharth's stepmother and sister-in-law, Chanchal, envy Aanchal's bond with the family, and she and Lalita conspire against her. Ayush begins to resent Aanchal because he thinks she is replacing his mother. Sachin grows closer to Aanchal. Siddharth and Aanchal also grow close after he offers to help her with her fashion designs. Siddharth's father and Dheeraj want Siddharth and Aanchal to marry, but when they tell Siddharth he says that no one can replace Jaya. Aanchal overhears him, and does not want to replace Jaya. Siddharth and Sachin continue to grow closer to Aanchal. Ayush and Juhi dislike her more after Jaya's mother dies. Chanchal blames Aanchal for her aunt's death.

Siddharth proposes to Aanchal because he wants her to be a mother to his children. Aanchal, Haryaman, Dheeraj, and Sachin are happy, but Lalita, Chanchal, Ayush, and Juhi are angry. Aanchal abandons her dream of being a fashion designer to become a wife and mother. This frustrates Sudeep, who has always loved Aanchal. After their marriage, Aanchal and Siddharth slowly fall in love. Lalita and Chanchal throw Aanchal out of the house, but Siddharth and Sachin leave with her; Ayush and Juhi refuse to join them, and Siddharth cuts ties with them. Aanchal is disappointed to learn that she is pregnant, since the children have still not accepted her. She plans an abortion; Siddharth is opposed, and they decide to keep the baby. Sachin is crippled in an accident under Aanchal's care. Lalita and Chanchan taunt her, but Siddharth and Aanchal do their best to help Sachin. Aanchal finally gives birth to a son, whom she names Jai; she leaves him with her aunt and uncle so she can get the children to accept her. Aanchal and Siddharth focus on Sachin's progress, and Aanchal turns down a job as a fashion designer. Juhi sees Jaya in a dream, and she tells her to accept Aanchal. Lalita and Chanchan finally realize that Aanchal sacrificed for their family, and Ayush. Ayush appears with Jai at a festival and gives him to Aanchal, calling her "mum". Aanchal sees Jaya in the sky as she waves goodbye, and the whole family is finally reunited.

== Cast ==
- Megha Gupta as Aanchal Gupta/ Aanchal Siddharth Tyagi an orphan living with relatives. Smart, sweet and obedient, she is Siddharth's second wife, Jai's mother, and Ayush, Juhi, and Sachin's step-mother.
- Sameer Dharmadhikari as Siddharth Tyagi: Hardworking and obedient, he is Hariman and Lakshmi's son, Lalita's stepson, Dheeraj's stepbrother, Aanchal and Jaya's husband, and Ayush, Juhi, Sachin, and Jai's father.
- Lata Sabharwal as Jaya Siddharth Tyagi: Siddharth's first wife and Ayush, Juhi and Sachin's mother, from a wealthy family
- Abir Goswami as Dheeraj Tyagi: Harriman and Lalita's only son, and Siddharth stepbrother and Jaya and Aanchal's stepbrother in law
- Indu Verma as Chanchal Tyagi: Siddharth's stepsister-in-law and Jaya's paternal cousin
- Pramatesh Mehta as Hariman Tyagi: Lakshmi and Lalita's husband, Siddharth and Dheeraj's father, Aanchal and Jaya's father-in-law and Ayush, Juhi, Sachin and Jai's grandfather
- Kiran Bhargava as Lalita Devi Tyagi: Hariman's second wife, Dheeraj's mother, Chanchal's mother-in-law, Siddharth's stepmother, Jaya and Aanchal's stepmother-in-law, and Vicky's grandmother
- Neeraj Kshetarpal as Bhushan Sinha
- Leena Prabhu as Mrs. Sinha
- Rajat Wats as Manu, Aanchal's cousin and Bhushan's son
- Uday Tikekar as Ramakant, Jaya's father and Siddharth's father-in-law
- Nishigandha Wad as Bharti, Jaya's mother and Siddharth's mother-in-law
- Shailesh Datar as Ravikant, Chanchal's father and Jaya's paternal uncle
- Aman Sondhi as Dr. Sudeep, a doctor in love with Aanchal
- Aditansh as Aayush Tyagi, Siddharth and Jaya's eldest son, Aanchal's stepson, Hariman and Lakshmi's eldest grandson and Juhi, Sachin and Jai's elder brother
- Ayushi Shah as Juhi Tyagi, Siddharth and Jaya's daughter, Aanchal's stepdaughter, Hariman and Lakshmi's granddaughter and Ayush, Sachin and Jai's sister
- Krish Karnavat as Sachin Tyagi, Siddharth and Jaya's youngest son, Aanchal's stepson, Hariman and Lakshmi's elder grandson and Ayush, Juhi and Jai's brother
- Tirath as Vicky Tyagi: Dheeraj and Chanchal's son, Lalita and Hariman's younger grandson and Aayush, Juhi, Sachin, and Jai's paternal cousin
- Prinal Oberai as Dr. Sonali
