= Thakurdwar =

Village in Maharashtra

Thakurdwar is a neighbourhood in Mumbai. It is known for its jewellers and Maharashtrian community.
