= Tarachand Barjatya =

Indian film producer (1914–1992)

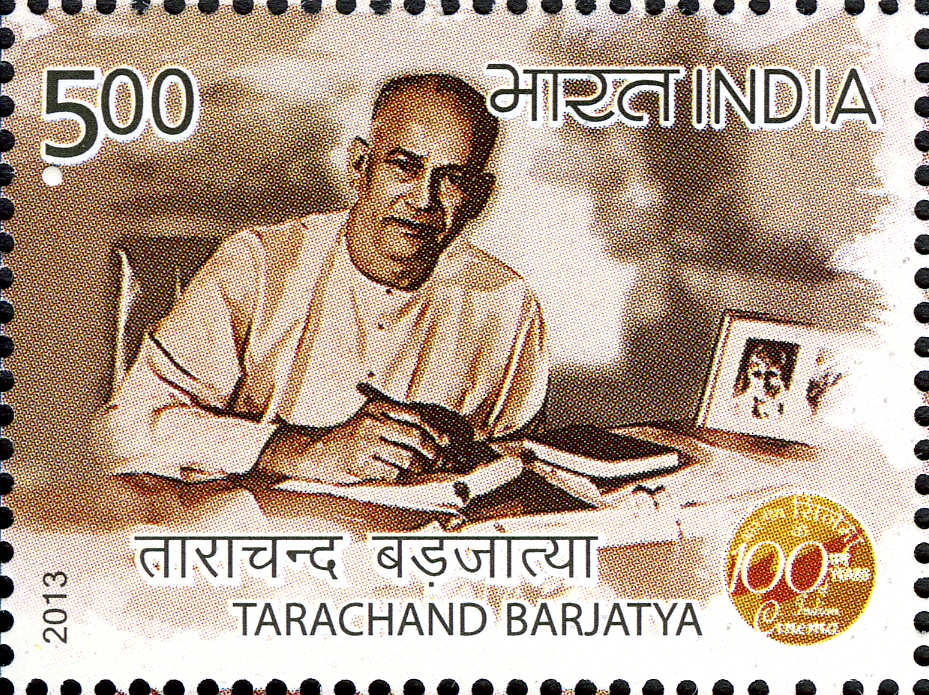
- Barjatya on a 2013 stamp of India
- Born: 10 May 1914; Rajshri Bhawan, Kuchaman City, Jodhpur State, British India
- Died: 21 September 1992 (aged 78)
- Education: Vidyasagar College
- Occupations: Producer; Director of Rajshri Productions
- Children: Rajkumar Barjatya
- Relatives: Sooraj R. Barjatya (grandson); Kavita K. Barjatya (granddaughter)

Tarachand Barjatya (10 May 1914 – 21 September 1992) was an Indian film producer. He has produced many Hindi films from the 1960s through to the 1980s. He founded Rajshri Productions, which continues to produce films even today. His mainstay was family-oriented films based on family values.

== Early life and education ==
Barjatya was born in Kuchaman City in Rajasthan in a Marwari Jain family in 1914. He graduated from Vidyasagar College in Calcutta.

== Career ==
He established Rajshri Pictures (P) Ltd. in 1947. In 1962, he launched its film production division Rajshri Productions (P) Limited, which produced the film Aarti.

Some of the notable films produced by him are Dosti, Jeevan Mrityu, Uphaar, Piya Ka Ghar, Saudagar, Geet Gaata Chal, Tapasya, Chitchor, Dulhan Wahi Jo Piya Man Bhaye, Ankhiyon Ke Jharokhon Se, Sawan Ko Aane Do, Taraana, Nadiya Ke Paar, and Saaransh.

== Personal life and death ==
His grandson Sooraj R. Barjatya is a renowned film producer and director. His granddaughter is Kavita K. Barjatya, who is an Indian television and film producer.

Barjatya died in 1992.
