= Main Prem Ki Diwani Hoon =

2003 Indian film by Sooraj Barjatya

- Film poster
- Directed by: Sooraj Barjatya
- Written by: Sooraj Barjatya
- Based on: Chitchor by Basu Chatterjee; Chittachakor by Subodh Ghosh
- Produced by: Ajit Kumar Barjatya; Kamal Kumar Barjatya; Rajkumar Barjatya
- Starring: Hrithik Roshan; Kareena Kapoor; Abhishek Bachchan
- Cinematography: Rajan Kinagi
- Edited by: Mukhtar Ahmed
- Music by: Anu Malik
- Production company: Rajshri Productions
- Distributed by: Yash Raj Films
- Release date: 27 June 2003
- Running time: 197 minutes
- Country: India
- Language: Hindi
- Budget: ₹24 crore
- Box office: ₹39.31 crore

Main Prem Ki Diwani Hoon (English: I am crazy about Prem), is a 2003 Indian Hindi-language musical romance film directed by Sooraj Barjatya and produced by Rajshri Productions. The film is a remake of the 1976 Hindi film Chitchor, which itself is based on Subodh Ghosh's Bengali short story Chittachakor. It stars Hrithik Roshan, Kareena Kapoor and Abhishek Bachchan in lead roles. It was released on 27 June 2003 to negative reviews from critics, and was declared as a commercial failure. However, Bachchan's performance was well received and earned him a nomination for the Filmfare Award for Best Supporting Actor at the 49th Filmfare Awards.

== Plot ==
Sanjana is a vivacious young woman. She has just graduated from college and is not happy about the concept of arranged marriage, much to the dismay of her mother Susheela.

Roopa, Sanjana's older sister, who has settled in the U.S., calls up her parents to inform them that her friend, Prem, has seen Sanjana's photo and is interested in getting to know her. Prem is a wealthy businessman, settled in the U.S. with his parents. Sanjana is not pleased with this development but she eventually agrees and meets Prem.

At first, Sanjana can't stand the enthusiastic and outgoing Prem, and plays a series of pranks on him. As they begin to spend more time together, they eventually fall in love, much to the delight of her parents who adore him too. He returns to the U.S. for his job and promises to come back. However, Roopa informs the family that Prem could not make it, so someone else was sent in his place.

Sanjana's confused parents find out that there was a mix-up. The man who arrived was not the wealthy N.R.I. Prem Kumar, whom Sanjana was meant to meet. Instead, he is Prem Kishen, an employee in Prem Kumar's company.

Prem Kumar arrives in India and meets Sanjana and begins to have feelings for her. Sanjana's mother slowly tries to push her towards Prem Kumar, though her father has reservations because he knows how much Sanjana and Prem Kishan are in love.

Prem Kumar and Sanjana begin spending time together and become friends due to their common interests, but Sanjana remains committed to Prem Kishen. Prem Kishan returns to Sanjana's house, where he is treated coldly by her mother and witnesses Prem Kumar's feelings for Sanjana. He reveals the truth to her – that his boss was supposed to marry her and not him. Sanjana is devastated.

A marriage is arranged for Sanjana and Prem Kumar by their respective mothers. Prem Kishen's loyalty to his boss and his boss' happiness forces him to leave, while a heartbroken Sanjana agrees only for the sake of her parents. Eventually, Prem Kumar learns the truth and unites Sanjana with Prem Kishen.

== Cast ==
- Hrithik Roshan as Prem Kishen Mathur
- Abhishek Bachchan as Prem Kumar
- Kareena Kapoor as Sanjana Satyaprakash
- Pankaj Kapoor as Suraj Satyaprakash
- Himani Shivpuri as Susheela Satyaprakash
- Reema Lagoo as Poonam Kumar, Prem Kumar's Mother
- Johny Lever as Johnny
- Tannaz Irani as Roopa, Sanjana's older sister
- Raju Shrivastava as Shambhu
- Vrajesh Hirjee as Rustom
- Shobha Khote as Mother Fernandes
- Farida Jalal as Mrs. Kapoor
- Ruby Bhatia as herself
- Jaaved Jaaferi as himself
- Johnny as Dog

== Soundtrack ==
Main Prem Ki Diwani Hoon

Soundtrack album by Anu Malik
- Released: 10 May 2003
- Genre: Feature film soundtrack
- Label: Saregama
- Producer: Kamal Kumar Barjatya; Rajkumar Barjatya

Anu Malik chronology
Ishq Vishk (2003)	Main Prem Ki Diwani Hoon (2003)	Saaya (2003)

The film's music was composed by Anu Malik. Most of the songs were sung by K. S. Chithra, who performed vocals for Kapoor, while KK and Shaan performed vocals for Roshan and Bachchan, respectively. All the lyrics were penned by Dev Kohili. According to the Indian trade website Box Office India, with around 16,00,000 units sold, this film's soundtrack album was the year's seventh highest-selling.

No.	Title	Singer(s)	Length
1.	"Chali Aayee"	K. S. Chithra, KK	6:08
2.	"Sanjana I Love You"	K. S. Chithra, KK, Sunidhi Chauhan	7:50
3.	"Bani Bani"	Zubeen Garg, K. S. Chithra	6:58
4.	"Aur Mohabbat Hai"	Shaan	5:46
5.	"O Ajnabi" (happy)	K. S. Chithra, KK	6:42
6.	"Kasam Ki Kasam"	K. S. Chithra, Shaan	6:03
7.	"Papa Ki Pari"	Sunidhi Chauhan, Kareena Kapoor	5:29
8.	"Ladka Yeh Kehta Hai"	KK	6:06
9.	"O Ajnabi" (sad)	K. S. Chithra, Kunal Ganjawala	6:09
10.	"Bhatke Panchhi"	K. S. Chithra	2:52
11.	"Prem! Prem! Prem!" (bonus title track)	K. S. Chithra, KK, Shaan	4:47

== Reception ==
Narendra Kusnur of Mid-Day wrote of the performances: "Hrithik looks good - but tends to go overboard with his enthusiasm, especially in the first half. Kareena is spontaneous and Abhishek is convincing." However, he concluded, "But on the whole, there’s little to make you go diwana or diwani." Sukanya Verma of Rediff was critical of Hrithik and Kareena's chemistry, writing that "their pairing seems to have lost its freshness." She noted that the film "does have its moments, though: Sanjana welcoming Prem (Hrithik) in a hilarious Sati-Savitri take-off; Prem (Abhishek) attempting to learn cycling; Sanjana teasing Prem (Abhishek) about his shyness. But these are no excuses for an otherwise non-happening film from a filmmaker known to create magic on screen." Chitra Mahesh of The Hindu opined that the movie "is a complete let down," and that Hrithik and Kareena "are made to play characters that are close to being high pitched," but was positive of Abhishek and Pankaj's performances.
