= Hum Pyar Tumhi Se Kar Baithe =

- Directed by: Mohan Singh Rathore
- Screenplay by: Mohan Singh Rathore
- Story by: Mohan Singh Rathore
- Produced by: Ajit Kumar Barjatya; Kamal Kumar Barjatya; Rajkumar Barjatya
- Starring: Jugal Hansraj; Tina Rana
- Cinematography: H. Laxminarayan
- Edited by: Mukhtar Ahmed
- Music by: Raamlaxman
- Distributed by: Rajshri Productions
- Release date: 8 November 2002 (India)
- Country: India
- Language: Hindi

Hum Pyar Tumhi Se Kar Baithe is a 2002 Indian Hindi-language film directed by Mohan Singh Rathor and produced by Ratan Jain. It stars Jugal Hansraj and Tina Rana in pivotal roles.

== Cast ==
- Jugal Hansraj...Vishwas
- Tina Rana...Priya
- Sachin Khedekar...Vikas
- Anoop Soni as Jai
- Vishnu Sharma
- Mushtaq Khan...Bharoselal
- Johny Lever...Pyare
- Dinesh Hingoo...Havaldar Dharti Dhakel Singh
- Viju Khote...Shopkeeper in Mount Abu
- Navni Parihar...Mamta
- Jeet Upendra

== Soundtrack ==
#	Title	Singer(s)	Lyricist
1	"Aaj Ka Samaa"	Saurabh P Srivastav	Ravinder Rawal
2	"Aap Ka Makaan"	Saurabh P Srivastav, Alka Yagnik	Israr Ansari
3	"Bhala Karenge Shri"	Ravindra Bijoor, Pratima Rao	Ravinder Rawal
4	"Dil Dena Hai"	Alka Yagnik	Shaheen Iqbal
5	"Ek Kamre Mein"	Alka Yagnik	Dev Kohli
6	"Hum Pyar Tumhi Se Kar Baithe"	Alka Yagnik	Israr Ansari
7	"Koi Jaane Naa"	Saurabh P Srivastav	Ravinder Rawal
8	"Raat Ke Baj"	Saurabh P Srivastav, Alka Yagnik	Aziz Khan Shahani
9	"Rang Layi Hai"	Saurabh P Srivastav, Alka Yagnik	Suman Sarin
10	"Thoda Bachpan, Zara Si Jawani"	Saurabh P Srivastav	Suman Sarin
