= Ek Vivaah... Aisa Bhi =

2008 Hindi film by Kaushik Ghatak

- Movie poster
- Directed by: Kaushik Ghatak
- Written by: Sooraj R. Barjatya; Ashapurna Devi
- Produced by: Ajit Kumar Barjatya; Kamal Kumar Barjatya; Rajkumar Barjatya
- Starring: Isha Koppikar; Sonu Sood; Alok Nath; Vallabh Vyas
- Cinematography: Harish Joshi
- Edited by: V. N. Mayekar
- Music by: Ravindra Jain
- Distributed by: Rajshri Productions
- Release date: 7 November 2008
- Country: India
- Language: Hindi
- Budget: ₹35 million
- Box office: ₹23.55 million

Ek Vivaah... Aisa Bhi (English: A Marriage Like This, Too) is a 2008 Indian Hindi-language romantic drama film directed by Kaushik Ghatak and produced by Rajshri Productions, based on a story by Ashapurna Devi. The film stars Isha Koppikar and Sonu Sood. It was released on 7 November 2008 to mixed reviews from critics.

== Plot ==
Ek Vivaah... Aisa Bhi is the story of Chandni, who belongs to a middle-class family living in Bhopal, and Prem, who is an unconventional ghazal singer and hails from an upper-middle-class family. Chandni's mother died when she was 15 and she has two very young siblings. Chandni and Prem meet to practice for a Ghazal competition and fall in love. Families meet and agree on their marriage. On the day of their engagement, Chandni's father dies, leaving her younger brother and younger sister dependent on Chandni herself. Initially, Chandni decides to leave the house and her siblings under the care of her paternal uncle; however, when she realizes that her unscrupulous uncle and aunt want only the house and care two hoots about her siblings, she decides to bring them up herself. Prem promises to wait for her and assists her in her troubles, while at the same time having become a famous ghazal singer.

Chandni sacrifices her dream of becoming a singer and starts giving music lessons at home. She also sings at parties and weddings to earn a livelihood. Years pass by; her siblings have grown up now. Her brother graduates with flying colours and lands up with a good job. He insists Chandni to leave all the responsibilities on him. She insists that he marry his longtime girlfriend, Natasha. Since Natasha is from an affluent family, he believes that she won't understand their culture and lifestyle. But he marries her anyway.

Believing that now Anuj and Natasha will take care of the ancestral house, Chandni and Prem decide to get married. But Chandni's problems never seem to end. Chandni's brother's wife, Natasha, refused to keep up with traditions and demanded a separate life with her husband.

Prem's mother, who had grown old and wanted to see her son married, requested Chandni to marry him or leave him for good. Chandni, who has already sent her brother with his wife to lead a separate life, cannot leave her sister alone. She wants to send her sister abroad for further studies. She asks Prem to forget her and get married for his mother's sake.

Chandni's student, who is settled with his family abroad, agrees to help arrange Chandni's sister's studies. His mother then gets a thought of getting them married. Chandni agrees and plans to go on a pilgrimage after this. On the other hand, Anuj feels helpless being separated from his sisters. Natasha's father makes her realise her mistake and understand the importance of family.

In the end, Natasha and Anuj return home from their younger sister's marriage. Chandni is now free from her responsibilities. Prem returns with his mother to finally take Chandni to his home. Chandni and Prem's marriage is arranged, and they are shown singing in a show together, signifying that they lived happily ever after.

== Cast ==
- Isha Koppikar as Chandni Shrivastava Ajmera
- Sonu Sood as Prem Ajmera
- Vishal Malhotra as Anuj B. Shrivastava, Chandni's brother
  - Amey Pandya as Young Anuj B. Shrivastava
- Amrita Prakash as Sandhya B. Shrivastava, Chandni's sister
  - Ishita Panchal as Young Sandhya B. Shrivastava
- Alok Nath as Bhushan Shrivastava, Chandni's father
- Smita Jaykar Mrs Ajmera, Prem's mother
- Chhavi Mittal as Natasha A. Shrivastava, Anuj's wife
- Ritu Vashisht as Firdaus, Chandni's friend
- Daman Baggan as Happy Singh, Prem's friend
- Anand Abhyankar as Chandni's uncle
- Jaya bhattacharya as Chandni's aunt
- Vallabh Vyas as Dr. Prabhat
- Anang Desai as Natasha's father
- Prashant Gupta as Rajeev (Sandhya's husband)
- Mushtaq Khan as Whistler in bus
- Gargi patel as Gayatri ji (Rajeev's mother)

== Soundtrack ==
Ek Vivaah... Aisa Bhi

Soundtrack album by Ravindra Jain
- Released: 7 November 2008
- Studio: Rajshri Entertainment
- Genre: Bollywood Music
- Label: Big Music & T Series
- Producer: Ravindra Jain

Ravindra Jain chronology
'Vivah' (2006)	Ek Vivaah... Aisa Bhi (2008)

Ravindra Jain was the music director and lyricist of this album.

Professional ratings
Review scores
Source	Rating
BollywoodHungama	link

Song	Artist	Duration (mm:ss)
"Mujhme Zinda Hai Woh"	Shaan & Shreya Ghoshal	06:03
"Mujhme Zinda Hai Woh" (Part II)	Shaan & Shreya Ghoshal	01:16
"Dekhe Akele Humne Solah Mele"	Shreya Ghoshal	03:50
"Mandir Hai Ghar Ye Hamara"	Suresh Wadkar	02:39
"Dono Nibhayein Apna Dharam"	Shaan, Shreya Ghoshal & Suresh Wadkar	03:01
"Banna Banni"	Chorus	03:00
"Kya Soch Ke Aaye The"	Shaan	03:37
"Lo Ji Hum Aa Gaye"	Shaan, Pamela Jain, Farid Sabri, Satish Dehra	05:14
"Jhirmir Jhirmir Meha Barse"	Shaan & Shreya Ghoshal	06:27
"Jhirmir Jhirmir Meha Barse" (Part II)	Shaan & Shreya Ghoshal	03:10
"Sang Sang Rahenge Janam Janam"	Shaan, Shreya Ghoshal & Suresh Wadkar	04:41
"Neend Mein Hai"	Shaan	03:35

== Critical reception ==
Manish Gajjar of BBC.com gave the film 4 out of 5, writing "Eesha Koppikhar gives a sincere and tear-jerking performance as the courageous Chandni, who rises above her own needs to look after her family in the hour of need. Sonu Sood acts well as the respectful son and lover, who patiently wait for 12 long years to be with Chandni. On the whole, Ek Vivaah Aisa Bhi is a family entertainer appealing to audiences who like sentimental love stories and crave for traditional Hindi movies." Taran Adarsh of Bollywood Hungama gave the film 3.5 out of 5, writing "On the whole, EK VIVAAH... AISA BHI is akin to a delicious Indian thali in times of Pastas and Pizzas. You may opt for international cuisine at times, but Indian food, for an Indian at heart, would never go out of vogue. At the box-office, expectedly, the film may start slow, but it has the merits to climb the ladder with each passing show. The strategy of releasing the film at single screens and that too at limited centres makes wise business sense, since EK VIVAAH... AISA BHI is not the multiplex kind of movie. Business at single screens of Gujarat, Uttar Pradesh, Rajasthan, Madhya Pradesh and Bihar should be the best."

Rajeev Masand of CNN-IBN gave the film 2 out of 5, writing "I’m going with two out of five and at best an average rating for director Kaushik Ghatak’s Ek Vivaah Aisa Bhi. Watch it if you must for Isha Koppikar’s confident performance, she’s in very good form even though the film isn’t." Patcy N of Rediff.com gave the film 2 out of 5, writing "The first half is kind of slow (must be all those songs) though the pace picks up in the second half. Music here is not as catchy as in the previous Rashree outings. Performance-wise, the entire cast has done a decent job. Not quite Vivah but romantics can still go for this one."
