= The ITA School of Performing Arts =

Indian drama school

Coordinates: 19.1749°N 72.8468°E

The Indian Television Academy (ITA) School of Performing Arts is a school formed as an initiative of The Indian Television Academy and founded by Anu Ranjan and Shashi Ranjan in 2001. It was created with the aim of standardizing the Indian television industry.
