= Sooraj Barjatya =

Indian filmmaker (born 1964)

Sooraj R. Barjatya
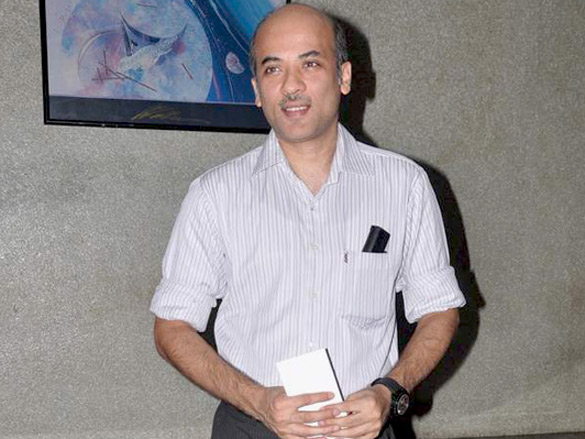
- Barjatya in 2012
- Born: 22 February 1964 (age 62); Bombay, Maharashtra, India
- Occupation: Filmmaker
- Years active: 1989–present
- Spouse: Vineeta Barjatya (m. 1986)
- Children: 3
- Father: Rajkumar Barjatya
- Relatives: Tarachand Barjatya (grandfather); Kavita K. Barjatya (cousin)

Sooraj R. Barjatya (born 22 February 1964) is an Indian filmmaker who works in Hindi cinema. He has directed and produced some of the most commercially successful Hindi films. His films often include themes of familial ties and values, and are rooted in traditional Indian culture. Barjatya is the chairman of Rajshri Productions, which was formed by his late grandfather Tarachand Barjatya in 1947.

Barjatya began his career as an assistant director to Mahesh Bhatt. He made his directorial debut with Maine Pyar Kiya (1989), a top-grossing romantic drama. His next release, Hum Aapke Hain Koun..! (1994), became the highest-grossing Indian film to that point. He had further commercial success in the family dramas Hum Saath-Saath Hain (1999), Vivah (2006), and Prem Ratan Dhan Payo (2015). He won the National Film Award for Best Direction for Uunchai (2022).

== Early life ==
Sooraj Barjatya was born in a Marwari Jain family in Bombay. He attended St. Mary's School, Mumbai and The Scindia School in Gwalior. Encouraged by his paternal grandfather, Tarachand Barjatya, he directed his first film Maine Pyar Kiya for Rajshri at the young age of 24. He married Vineeta Barjatya in 1986 and the couple have three children.

== Career ==
Barjatya made his directorial debut with the romantic musical Maine Pyar Kiya (1989) starring Salman Khan and Bhagyashree in lead roles. The film received positive reviews upon release, and emerged as the highest-grossing Hindi film of the year, as well as one of the highest grossers of the 1980s. It launched the careers of its lead actors, and earned them the Filmfare Award for Best Male Debut and Best Female Debut, respectively; it also earned Barjatya his first nomination for the Filmfare Award for Best Director.

He teamed up with Khan again alongside Madhuri Dixit for the ensemble musical romantic drama Hum Aapke Hain Koun..! (1994). The film received widespread critical acclaim upon release, and emerged as the highest-grossing Indian film at the time of its release. It became the first film to gross over ₹1 billion, with Box Office India gave it the verdict "All Time Blockbuster", and described it as "the biggest blockbuster of the modern era." The film was also awarded the Guinness World Record for "Highest-grossing Indian film" after having grossed over ₹2.5 billion ($82 million) worldwide. Hum Aapke Hain Koun sold 74 million tickets in India, giving it the highest domestic footfalls of any Hindi film released since the 1990s. The film won numerous awards, including National Film Award for Best Popular Film Providing Wholesome Entertainment and the Filmfare Award for Best Film, in addition to earning Barjatya his first Filmfare Award for Best Director.

Hum Aapke Hain Koun..! influenced many subsequent Hindi films, and was also a trendsetter for glamorous family dramas and NRI-related films, and started Bollywood's "big-fat-wedding-film" trend. It also inspired hugely successful filmmakers such as Aditya Chopra and Karan Johar to make films with cultural themes. Hum Aapke Hain Koun..! belongs to a small collection of films, including Kismet (1943), Mother India (1957), Mughal-e-Azam (1960) and Sholay (1975), which are repeatedly watched throughout India and are viewed as definitive Hindi films with cultural significance.

He then collaborated with Khan for the third time for the family drama Hum Saath-Saath Hain (1999), which received mostly positive reviews from critics, and emerged as the highest-grossing Hindi film of the year.

His fourth film was the musical romantic comedy Main Prem Ki Diwani Hoon (2003) starring Hrithik Roshan, Kareena Kapoor and Abhishek Bachchan in lead roles. Prior to release, the film was considerably hyped due to Barjatya's previous successes and the A-list star cast. However, upon release, it was highly panned by critics, and emerged as the first commercial disaster of Barjatya's career.

His next film, the romantic drama Vivah (2006) starring Shahid Kapoor and Amrita Rao, however, emerged as one of the highest grossers of the year, despite mixed reviews.

Post Vivah, he produced the romance Ek Vivaah... Aisa Bhi (2008) directed by Kaushik Ghatak, starring Isha Koppikar and Sonu Sood in lead roles. The film received mixed-to-negative reviews upon release and emerged as a commercial failure at the box office.

Following a 9-year directorial hiatus, he returned to direction with the romantic family drama Prem Ratan Dhan Payo (2015), which marked his fourth collaboration with Khan, alongside Sonam Kapoor. Despite mixed reviews, the film emerged as the second highest-grossing Hindi film of the year, and one of the highest-grossing films of all time, grossing over ₹400 crore worldwide.

After another 7-year hiatus, his next directorial venture was the adventure drama Uunchai (2022) starring Amitabh Bachchan, Anupam Kher and Boman Irani with Parineeti Chopra. The film received mixed reviews upon release, and emerged as an below-average grosser at the box-office. The film earned him the National Film Award for Best Direction, in addition to his third nomination for the Filmfare Award for Best Director,

In all of Barjatya's films until Uunchai, the male protagonists are named 'Prem'. He had said in an interview that "Ours was a joint Marwari family and I grew up witnessing grand functions and wedding ceremonies in the family. The opulence shown in my films is based on my impressions as a child".

== Filmography ==
=== Films ===
Key
†	Denotes films that have not yet been released

Year	Title	Director	Writer	Notes	Ref(s)
1989	Maine Pyar Kiya	Yes	Yes	Nominated – Filmfare Award for Best Director	
1994	Hum Aapke Hain Koun..!	Yes	Yes	Won – Filmfare Award for Best Director; Won – Filmfare Award for Best Screenplay	
1999	Hum Saath-Saath Hain	Yes	Yes		
2003	Main Prem Ki Diwani Hoon	Yes	Yes		
2006	Vivah	Yes	Yes		
2008	Ek Vivaah... Aisa Bhi	No	Yes		
2015	Prem Ratan Dhan Payo	Yes	Yes		
2022	Uunchai	Yes	Yes	Won – National Film Award for Best Direction; Nominated – Filmfare Award for Best Director	
2026	Yeh Prem Mol Liya †	Yes	Yes		

=== Television ===
Year	Title	Showrunner	Director	Writer	Producer	Editor	Composer	Episodes	Notes	Reference
2025	Bada Naam Karenge	Yes	No	No	Yes	No	No	8 episodes		
2026	Sangamarmar	Yes	No	No	No	No	No	9 episodes		
