= Rajshri Productions =

Indian film production and distribution company

- Type: Private
- Industry: Entertainment
- Founded: 1947; 79 years ago
- Founder: Tarachand Barjatya
- Headquarters: Mumbai, India
- Key people: Sooraj Barjatya (Chairman & Managing Director)
- Products: Film production; Film distribution; Television production
- Website: www.rajshri.com

Rajshri Productions is an Indian film production and distribution company based in Mumbai, India, established in 1947, which is primarily involved in producing Hindi films.

== History ==
Rajshri Productions, the film production division of Rajshri, was established in 1947. Its first release Aarti met with critical acclaim and was screened at international film festivals. This was followed by Dosti, a non-star-cast film which became a box office success, and received the National Award for the Best Hindi Film of the Year (1964) and six Filmfare Awards.

Rajshri Productions made several more successful and critically acclaimed movies between the 1960s and 1980s including Uphaar, Geet Gaata Chal, Ankhiyon Ke Jharokhon Se, Chitchor, Dulhan Wahi Jo Piya Man Bhaye and Saaransh. At the end of the 1980s, when the film industry experienced a slump due to the advent of home video, Rajshri was on the verge of closing down. However, the company had a hit with a musical teenage romance, Maine Pyar Kiya, directed in-house by Sooraj R. Barjatya, which saved the company from closure. It became one of Indian cinema's biggest grossers, and won six Filmfare Awards including Best Film and the Most Sensational Debut of the Year for 24-year-old Salman Khan.

Salman Khan followed up the success of Maine Pyar Kiya with Rajshri blockbusters Hum Aapke Hain Koun and Hum Saath Saath Hain. Hum Aapke Hain Koun remains one of the highest grossing releases in the history of Indian cinema, and won the National Award for the most popular film providing wholesome entertainment, as well as eight Filmfare Awards and six Screen Awards, including Best Film, Best Actress and Best Director.

== Digital ==
In November 2006, Rajshri Productions launched a broadband entertainment portal, Rajshri.com, offering streaming and downloads of various forms of content including movies, music videos, concerts, and documentaries. The digital content is from its own production house and others.

== Filmography ==
Key
†	Denotes films that have not yet been released

=== Films ===
Year	Film	Director	Notes
1956	Pennin Perumai	P. Pullayya	distributed by Rajshri Productions
1962	Aarti	Phani Majumdar	
1964	Dosti	Satyen Bose	
1966	Suraj	T. Prakash Rao	
1967	Taqdeer	A. Salaam	
1970	Jeevan Mrityu	Satyen Bose	
1971	Uphaar	Sudhendu Roy	
1972	Mere Bhaiya	Satyen Bose	
1972	Piya Ka Ghar	Basu Chatterjee	
1973	Saudagar	Sudhendu Roy	
1973	Honeymoon	Hiren Nag	
1975	Toofan	Kedar Kapoor	
1975	Geet Gaata Chal	Hiren Nag	
1976	Tapasya	Anil Ganguly	
1976	Chitchor	Basu Chatterjee	
1977	Paheli	Prashant Nanda	
1977	Alibaba Marjinaa	Kedar Kapoor	
1977	Agent Vinod	Deepak Bahry	
1977	Dulhan Wahi Jo Piya Man Bhaaye	Lekh Tandon	
1978	Ankhiyon Ke Jharokhon Se	Hiren Nag	
1978	Bandie	Alo Sarkar	
1979	Sunayana	Hiren Nag	
1979	Shikshaa	S. Ramanathan	
1979	Sawan Ko Aane Do	Kanak Mishra	
1979	Saanch Ko Aanch Nahin	Satyen Bose	
1979	Gopal Krishna	Vijay Sharma	
1979	Raadha Aur Seeta	Vijay Kapoor	
1979	Tarana	Deepak Bahry	
1979	Naiyya	Prashant Nanda	
1980	Payal Ki Jhankaar	Satyen Bose	
1980	Manokaamnaa	Kedar Kapoor	
1980	Maan Abhiman	Hiren Nag	
1980	Jazbaat	Sooraj Prakash	
1980	Ek Baar Kaho	Lekh Tandon	
1980	Humkadam	Anil Ganguly	
1981	Jiyo To Aise Jiyo	Kanak Mishra	
1982	Nadiya Ke Paar	Govind Moonis	
1982	Tumhare Bina	Satyen Bose	
1982	Sun Sajna	Chander Bahl	
1983	Sun Meri Laila	Chander H. Bahl	
1983	Dard-E-Dil	Suraj Prakash	
1984	Rakt Bandhan	Rajat Rakshit	
1984	Abodh	Hiren Nag	
1984	Saaransh	Mahesh Bhatt	
1984	Phulwari	Mukul Datt	
1986	Babul	Govind Moonis	
1989	Maine Pyar Kiya	Sooraj Barjatya	
1994	Hum Aapke Hain Koun	Sooraj Barjatya	
1999	Hum Saath Saath Hain	Sooraj Barjatya	
2002	Hum Pyar Tumhi Se Kar Baithe	Mohan Singh Rathore	
2003	Main Prem Ki Diwani Hoon	Sooraj Barjatya	
2003	Sasu Ghara Chali Jibi	Basant Sahu	
2004	Uuf Kya Jadoo Mohabbat Hai..!	Manoj J. Bhatia	
2005	Subhodrishti	Prabhat Roy	Bengali film
2006	Vivah	Sooraj Barjatya	
2008	Ek Vivaah... Aisa Bhi	Kaushik Gatak	written by Sooraj Barjatya
2010	Isi Life Mein	Vidhi Kasliwal	
2011	Love U...Mr. Kalakaar!	S. Manasvi	
2011	Jaana Pehchana	Sachin Pilgaonkar	
2014	Samrat & Co.	Kaushik Gatak	
2015	Prem Ratan Dhan Payo	Sooraj Barjatya	
2016	Dawat E Shaadi	Syed Hussain	Urdu film
2019	Hum Chaar	Abhishek Dixit	
2022	Uunchai	Sooraj Barjatya	
2023	Dono	Avnish S. Barjatya	
2024	Paani	Adinath Kothare	Marathi Film
2026	Yeh Prem Mol Liya †	Sooraj Barjatya	

=== Television ===
Year(s)	Show	Channel	Ref.
1985	Paying Guest	Doordarshan	
2004	Koie Jane Na	StarPlus	
2005–2011	Woh Rehne Waali Mehlon Ki	Sahara One	
2006	Pyaar Ke Do Naam: Ek Raadha, Ek Shyaam	StarPlus	
2008–2009	Main Teri Parchhain Hoon	NDTV Imagine	
2009–2012	Yahaaan Main Ghar Ghar Kheli	Zee TV	
2010	Do Hanson Ka Jodaa	NDTV Imagine	
2012–2013	Jhilmil Sitaaron Ka Aangan Hoga	Sahara One	
2012–2014	Pyaar Ka Dard Hai Meetha Meetha Pyaara Pyaara	StarPlus	
2014–2015	Mere Rang Mein Rangne Waali	Life OK	
2015–2016	Swabhiman	Colors TV	
2017–2018	Piyaa Albela	Zee TV	
2020	Dadi Amma... Dadi Amma Maan Jaao!	Star Plus	
2025	Manpasand Ki Shaadi	Colors TV	

=== Web series ===
Year(s)	Show	Channel	Ref.
2025	Bada Naam Karenge	SonyLIV	
2026	Sangamarmar	Jio Hotstar	

== Awards ==
- National Film Award for Best Popular Film Providing Wholesome Entertainment – Won
  1975 Tapasya
  1994 Hum Aapke Hain Koun..!
- Filmfare Best Movie Award – Won
  1965 Dosti
  1990 Maine Pyar Kiya
  1995 Hum Aapke Hain Kaun
- Filmfare Best Movie Award – Nominated
  1977 Chitchor
  1977 Tapasya
  1979 Ankhiyon Ke Jharokhon Se
  1985 Saaransh
  2023 Uunchai
- Zee Rishtey Award for Favourite Show (Fiction) – Nominated
  2009 Yahaaan Main Ghar Ghar Kheli
  2010 Yahaaan Main Ghar Ghar Kheli
- Zee Rishtey Award for Favourite Show (Fiction) – Won
  2011 Yahaaan Main Ghar Ghar Kheli
