= Hum Aapke Hain Koun..! (soundtrack) =

Soundtrack album by Raamlaxman
- Released: 30 July 1994
- Recorded: 1994
- Genre: Feature film soundtrack
- Length: 71:09
- Language: Hindi
- Label: His Master's Voice
- Producer: Raamlaxman

Singles from Hum Aapke Hain Koun..!
- 1. "Didi Tera Devar Deewana" Released: 1994

Hum Aapke Hain Koun..! is the soundtrack album to the 1994 film of the same name directed by Sooraj Barjatya and produced by Rajshri Productions, starring Madhuri Dixit and Salman Khan. The album featured 14 songs composed by Raamlaxman with lyrics written by Dev Kohli and Ravinder Rawal. The soundtrack, released under the His Master's Voice label, (Note: The label's name being changed to Saregama, which distributes cassettes, CDs and vinyl LPs under this name since 2000s.) became the second highest selling Bollywood soundtracks of all time. It was one of the most popular soundtracks in Bollywood, with all its musical numbers being featured in several Indian wedding ceremonies. The song "Didi Tera Devar Deewana" became one of the most popular Hindi film songs.

== Background ==
While developing the screenplay for Hum Aapke Hain Koun..!, Sooraj used musical numbers to avoid treating the situations in a cliched manner. Raamlaxman, who had previously worked with Rajshri's Maine Pyar Kiya (1989) that was also directed by Sooraj and starred Salman, had confirmed his involvement during the film's production on 2 July 1992 with a song composition for the muhurat ceremony. He had about 50 sessions with Sooraj while scripting. He had composed 15 tunes and recorded them within a span of three months. During the script narration, he would play those tunes for the cast members and would even sing them, if not recorded, so that the cast would perform accordingly.

When the film was ready, Sooraj received criticisms from industry members at a private screening, describing that the film had too many songs that increased the length. Despite Sooraj's initial reluctance, 10 days after the film's release, he agreed to edit the songs "Chocolate Lime Juice" and "Mujhse Juda Hokar" and a couple of stanzas from another song. The reception in the central and southern parts of India, particularly in Dehradun, Gandhinagar and Nizamabad, prompted Sooraj to restore those songs in its entirety, with the new prints.

The song "Didi Tera Devar Deewana" is said to be inspired by Ustad Nusrat Fateh Ali Khan's song "Saare Nabian". When the film was released in Pakistan, the words "Hai Raam" were omitted from the lyrics due to religious sentiments. Lata Mangeshkar, S. P. Balasubrahmanyam, Kumar Sanu, Udit Narayan, Shailendra Singh and Sharda Sinha recorded the vocals for the songs. Mangeshkar, who had been selective on recording songs for films in the 1990s, had performed for 10 songs in the album.

The digital release of the album had 14 songs—excluding the sad version of "Mujhse Juda Hokar" and "Hasta Hua Noorani Chehra" from the film Parasmani (1963), that was used when the characters play a game.

== Track listing ==
No.	Title	Lyrics	Singer(s)	Length
1.	"Maye Ni Maye"	Dev Kohli	Lata Mangeshkar	4:21
2.	"Didi Tera Devar Deewana"	Dev Kohli	Lata Mangeshkar, S. P. Balasubrahmanyam	8:05
3.	"Mausam Ka Jaadu"	Ravinder Rawal	Lata Mangeshkar, S. P. Balasubrahmanyam	5:03
4.	"Chocolate Lime Juice"	Dev Kohli	Lata Mangeshkar	4:27
5.	"Joote Do, Paise Lo"	Ravinder Rawal	Lata Mangeshkar, S. P. Balasubrahmanyam	4:36
6.	"Pehla Pehla Pyar"	Dev Kohli	S. P. Balasubrahmanyam	4:25
7.	"Dhiktana" (Part 1)	Ravinder Rawal	S. P. Balasubrahmanyam	5:20
8.	"Babul"	Ravinder Rawal	Sharda Sinha	3:44
9.	"Mujhse Juda Hokar"	Dev Kohli	Lata Mangeshkar, S. P. Balasubrahmanyam	6:02
10.	"Samdhi Samdhan"	Ravinder Rawal	Lata Mangeshkar, Kumar Sanu	5:51
11.	"Hum Aapke Hain Koun"	Dev Kohli	Lata Mangeshkar, S. P. Balasubrahmanyam	4:00
12.	"Wah Wah Ramji"	Ravinder Rawal	Lata Mangeshkar, S. P. Balasubrahmanyam	4:15
13.	"Lo Chali Main"	Ravinder Rawal	Lata Mangeshkar	2:53
14.	"Dhiktana" (Part 2)	Ravinder Rawal	Lata Mangeshkar, S. P. Balasubrahmanyam, Udit Narayan, Shailender Singh	8:07
Total length:				71:09

== Sales and records ==
The film's soundtrack achieved significant commercial success with the song "Didi Tera Devar Deewana" becoming one of the most popular film songs ever, topping various charts on radio stations and music television shows. Within two months, the album sold around 30 million cassette tapes, bringing sales of ₹11.7 crore (US$1.2 million). It was the highest-selling Bollywood soundtrack of the year, and the second-best selling soundtrack of the 1990s and all time, with around 10–12 million units being sold.

== Legal issues ==
Gulshan Kumar sold pirated copies of the soundtrack under the Super Cassettes Industries (Note: Currently operating under T-Series.) label and logo. In 1995, the Gramophone Company of India (Note: Parent company of the His Master's Voice and Saregama labels.) filed a lawsuit against Super Cassettes Industries for distributing unofficial audio cassettes and packaging it with the same cover sleeve of Gramaphone Co. India's publishings. The Delhi High Court ruled in favour of Gramaphone Co. India, restraining Super Cassettes Industries to use the same packaging as the album's original version.

== Accolades ==
Lata Mangeshkar, who had retired from accepting awards, had received the Filmfare Special Award in public demand after the success of "Didi Tera Devar Deewana".

Award	Category	Nominee	Result	Ref.
40th Filmfare Awards	Special Award	Lata Mangeshkar for "Didi Tera Devar Deewana"	Won	
40th Filmfare Awards	Best Music Director	Raamlaxman	Nominated	
40th Filmfare Awards	Best Lyricist	Dev Kohli for "Hum Aapke Hain Koun...!"	Nominated	
40th Filmfare Awards	Best Male Playback Singer	S. P. Balasubramaniam for "Hum Aapke Hain Koun...!"	Nominated	
1995 Screen Awards	Best Female Playback Singer	Lata Mangeshkar for "Maye Ni Maye"	Won	
1995 Screen Awards	Best Editing	Mukhtar Ahmed	Won	
