= List of Hindi songs recorded by S. P. Balasubrahmanyam =

S. P. Balasubrahmanyam's first work in Hindi films was, in Ek Duuje Ke Liye (1981), for which he received another National Film Award for Best Male Playback Singer. In 1989, Balasubrahmanyam was the playback singer for actor Salman Khan in the blockbuster Maine Pyar Kiya. The soundtrack for the film was very successful and he won a Filmfare Award for Best Male Playback Singer for the song Dil Deewana. For much of the next decade, Balasubrahmanyam continued as the "romantic singing voice" on the soundtracks of Khan's films. Notable among these was Hum Aapke Hain Koun..! which became the highest-grossing Hindi film of all time. Balasubrahmanyam's duet with Lata Mangeshkar, "Didi Tera Devar Deewana", was very popular. This solidified Balasubrahmanyam as one of the biggest playback singers in India. SP Balasubrahmanyam became identified as Salman Khan's voice in the 90s just like Kishore Kumar became Rajesh Khanna's voice through the 70s. In 2013, Balasubrahmanyam recorded the title song for Chennai Express, singing for the lead actor Shah Rukh Khan, under the music direction of Vishal–Shekhar, breaking his 15-year hiatus from Hindi cinema music.

== Film songs ==
=== 1981 ===
Film	Song	Composer(s)	Writer(s)	Co-singer(s)
Ek Duuje Ke Liye	"Tere Mere Beech Mein"	Laxmikant-Pyarelal	Anand Bakshi	
Ek Duuje Ke Liye	"Mere Jeevan Saathi"	Laxmikant-Pyarelal	Anand Bakshi	Anuradha Paudwal
Ek Duuje Ke Liye	"Hum Tum Dono"	Laxmikant-Pyarelal	Anand Bakshi	Lata Mangeshkar
Ek Duuje Ke Liye	"Tere Mere Beech Mein"(Duet)	Laxmikant-Pyarelal	Anand Bakshi	Lata Mangeshkar
Ek Duuje Ke Liye	"Hum Bane Tum Bane"	Laxmikant-Pyarelal	Anand Bakshi	Lata Mangeshkar
Mangalsutra	"Jawaani Sharaarat"	R. D. Burman	Nida Fazli	Asha Bhosle

=== 1982 ===
Film	Song	Composer(s)	Writer(s)	Co-singer(s)
Yeh To Kamaal Ho Gaya	Dekho Dekho	R. D. Burman	Anand Bakshi	
Yeh To Kamaal Ho Gaya	Dugdugi Baj	R. D. Burman	Anand Bakshi	
Yeh To Kamaal Ho Gaya	Naujwaon Mein	R. D. Burman	Anand Bakshi	
Yeh To Kamaal Ho Gaya	Main Awara Banjara	R. D. Burman	Anand Bakshi	Asha Bhosle
Yeh To Kamaal Ho Gaya	Yeh Duniya Ghum	R. D. Burman	Anand Bakshi	Asha Bhosle
Yeh To Kamaal Ho Gaya	Hum Tum Hum	R. D. Burman	Anand Bakshi	

=== 1983 ===
Film	Song	Composer(s)	Writer(s)	Co-singer(s)
Andhaa Kaanoon	Ek Taraf Hum	Laxmikant-Pyarelal	Anand Bakshi	Asha Bhosle
Andhaa Kaanoon	Mausam Ka	Laxmikant-Pyarelal	Anand Bakshi	Asha Bhosle
Himmatwala	Imtihan Imtihan	Bappi Lahiri	Indeevar	
Shubh Kaamna	Baagon Mein	R. D. Burman	Anjaan	
Shubh Kaamna	Pathsala Se	R. D. Burman	Anjaan	
Shubh Kaamna	Tumko Hai Pyar	R. D. Burman	Anjaan	
Shubh Kaamna	Is Dil Ne Socha	R. D. Burman	Anjaan	

=== 1984 ===
Film	Song	Composer(s)	Writer(s)	Co-singer(s)
Zara Si Zindagi	Zamane Mein	Laxmikant-Pyarelal	Anand Bakshi	
Zara Si Zindagi	Tana Dim	Laxmikant-Pyarelal	Anand Bakshi	Asha Bhosle
Ek Nai Paheli	Meri Mehbooba Se	Laxmikant-Pyarelal		
Teri Baahon Mein	Deewani Deewana	Bappi Lahiri		

=== 1985 ===
Film	Song	Composer(s)	Writer(s)	Co-singer(s)
Baadal	"Toota Na Dil Ka"(Duet)	Bappi Lahiri	Anjaan	S. Janaki
Baadal	"Toota Na Dil Ka"(Solo)	Bappi Lahiri	Anjaan	
Dekha Pyar Tumhara	"Na Baba"	Laxmikant–Pyarelal	Anjaan	
Dekha Pyar Tumhara	"Ek Hum Hai Jo"	Laxmikant–Pyarelal	Anjaan	Asha Bhosle
Saagar	"Oh Maria"	R. D. Burman	Javed Akhtar	Asha Bhosle
Saagar	"Yunhi Gaate Raho"	R. D. Burman	Javed Akhtar	Kishore Kumar
Saagar	"Sach Mere Yaar Hai"	R. D. Burman	Javed Akhtar	

=== 1989 ===
Film	Song	Composer(s)	Writer(s)	Co-singer(s)
Maine Pyar Kiya	"Maine Pyar Kiya"(Duet)	Ram Lakshman	Dev Kohli, Asad Bhopal	Lata Mangeshkar
Maine Pyar Kiya	"Dil Deewana"(Duet)	Ram Lakshman	Dev Kohli, Asad Bhopal	Lata Mangeshkar
Maine Pyar Kiya	"Kabootar Ja Ja Ja"(Duet)	Ram Lakshman	Dev Kohli, Asad Bhopal	Lata Mangeshkar
Maine Pyar Kiya	"Aate Jaate Haste Gaate"(Duet)	Ram Lakshman	Dev Kohli, Asad Bhopal	Lata Mangeshkar
Maine Pyar Kiya	"Aaja Shaam Hone Aayi"(Duet)	Ram Lakshman	Dev Kohli, Asad Bhopal	Lata Mangeshkar
Maine Pyar Kiya	"Aaya Mausam Dosti Ka"(Duet)	Ram Lakshman	Dev Kohli, Asad Bhopal	Lata Mangeshkar
Maine Pyar Kiya	"Mere Rang Me Rang Ne Wali"(Solo)	Ram Lakshman	Dev Kohli, Asad Bhopal	

=== 1991 ===
Film	Song	Composer(s)	Writer(s)	Co-singer(s)
100 Days	"Sun Beliya"	Raamlaxman	Dilip Tahir	Lata Mangeshkar
100 Days	"Sun Sun Sun Dilruba"	Raamlaxman	Dev Kohli	Lata Mangeshkar
100 Days	"Tana Dere Naa"	Raamlaxman	Ravindra Rawal	Lata Mangeshkar
Benaam Badsha	"O Mata Ke Laadle Soja"	Laxmikant–Pyarelal	Anand Bakshi	Kavita Krishnamurthy
Dancer	"Aao Chale Milke Gaaye" (Sad)	Anand–Milind	Sameer	solo
Dancer	"Naachoonga Toh Naachoge Tum"	Anand–Milind	Sameer	solo
Dancer	"Aao Chalo Milke Gaayen"	Anand–Milind	Sameer	Sadhana Sargam
Dancer	"Teri Yaad Aayi"	Anand–Milind	Sameer	Sadhana Sargam
Dancer	"Deewanon Ki Mastano Ki"	Anand–Milind	Sameer	Kavita Krishnamurthy, Udit Narayan
Dancer	"Rimjhim Rimjhim Sawan Barse"	Anand–Milind	Sameer	Lata Mangeshkar
Dancer	"Kabhi Mandir Kabhi Pooja"	Anand–Milind	Sameer	Sadhana Sargam, Udit Narayan
Dancer	"Yeke Yeme Yeke Yema"	Anand–Milind	Sameer	Kavita Krishnamurthy
First Love Letter	"Diwani Diwani"	Bappi Lahiri	Anjaan	Lata Mangeshkar
First Love Letter	"Tota Tota Sajan Se Kehna"	Bappi Lahiri	Anjaan	Lata Mangeshkar
First Love Letter	"Jab Se Mile Naina" (Male)	Bappi Lahiri	Anjaan	solo
First Love Letter	"Kaat Ke Ungli Kalam Banaoon"	Bappi Lahiri	Anjaan	solo
First Love Letter	"Kambal Naa Hatao Mujhe"	Bappi Lahiri	Anjaan	Asha Bhosle
Inspector Dhanush	"Ayaya O Duniya"	Bappi Lahiri	Indeevar	solo
Inspector Dhanush	"Aankhon Ka Noor Tu"	Bappi Lahiri	Indeevar	S. Janaki
Inspector Dhanush	"Mere Bhi Man Mein Halchal"	Bappi Lahiri	Indeevar	S. Janaki
Inspector Dhanush	"Mausam Garam Garam"	Bappi Lahiri	Indeevar	Bappi Lahiri, S. Janaki
Jeena Teri Gali Mein	"Jeena Teri Gali Mein"	Babul Bose	Ravindra Rawal	Anuradha Paudwal
Love	"Saathiya Tune Kya Kiya"	Anand–Milind	Majrooh Sultanpuri	K. S. Chithra
Love	"Aaja Aaja Give Me A Kiss"	Anand–Milind	Majrooh Sultanpuri	K. S. Chithra
Love	"My Love Meri Priyatama"	Anand–Milind	Majrooh Sultanpuri	K. S. Chithra
Love	"We Are Made For Each Other"	Anand–Milind	Majrooh Sultanpuri	K. S. Chithra
Love	"I Am Sorry"	Anand–Milind	Majrooh Sultanpuri	solo
Patthar Ke Phool	"Dhin Tinak Dhinna Deewana Dil"	Raamlaxman	Dev Kohli	Lata Mangeshkar
Patthar Ke Phool	"Maut Se Kya Darna"	Raamlaxman	Dev Kohli	Lata Mangeshkar
Patthar Ke Phool	"Naja Naja Naja"	Raamlaxman	Dev Kohli	solo
Patthar Ke Phool	"Naja Naja Naja" (sad)	Raamlaxman	Dev Kohli	solo
Patthar Ke Phool	"Yaar Wai Wai Yaar" (sad)	Raamlaxman	Dev Kohli	solo
Patthar Ke Phool	"Yaar Wai Wai Yaar"	Raamlaxman	Dev Kohli	Suresh Wadkar, Manhar Udhas, Poornima
Patthar Ke Phool	"Kabhi Tu Chhalia Lagta Hai"	Raamlaxman	Ravindra Rawal	Lata Mangeshkar
Patthar Ke Phool	"Sajna Tere Bina Kya Jeena"	Raamlaxman	Ravindra Rawal	Lata Mangeshkar
Patthar Ke Phool	"Sun Dilruba"	Raamlaxman	Ravindra Rawal	solo
Patthar Ke Phool	"Tumse Jo Dekhte Hi Pyar Hua"	Raamlaxman	Noor Kaskar	Lata Mangeshkar
Prem Qaidi	"Antakshari"	Anand–Milind	Sameer	Kavita Krishnamurthy
Prem Qaidi	"Arey Logo Zara Dekho"	Anand–Milind	Sameer	Kavita Krishnamurthy
Prem Qaidi	"Hum Hain Prem Qaidi"	Anand–Milind	Sameer	Kavita Krishnamurthy
Prem Qaidi	"I Live For You"	Anand–Milind	Sameer	Kavita Krishnamurthy
Prem Qaidi	"Tere In Gaalon Pe"	Anand–Milind	Sameer	Kavita Krishnamurthy
Prem Qaidi	"Priyatama O Meri Priyatama"	Anand–Milind	Sameer	Sadhana Sargam
Saajan	"Bahut Pyar Karte Hain Tumko Sanam" (Male)	Nadeem–Shravan	Sameer	solo
Saajan	"Pehli Baar Mile Hain"	Nadeem–Shravan	Sameer	solo
Saajan	"Tumse Milne Ki Tamanna Hai"	Nadeem–Shravan	Sameer	solo
Saajan	"Dekha Hai Pehli Baar"	Nadeem–Shravan	Sameer	Alka Yagnik
Saajan	"Jiyen Toh Jiyen Kaise" - I	Nadeem–Shravan	Sameer	Pankaj Udhas, Kumar Sanu, Anuradha Paudwal
Shanti Kranti	"Aadhi Night Mein"	Hamsalekha	Indeevar	Alka Yagnik
Shanti Kranti	"Purvaee Purvaee"	Hamsalekha	Indeevar	Alka Yagnik
Shanti Kranti	"Sajna O O"	Hamsalekha	Indeevar	Alka Yagnik
Shanti Kranti	"Tu Hi Mera Hai Jeevan"	Hamsalekha	Indeevar	Alka Yagnik
Shanti Kranti	"One Two Three"	Hamsalekha	Indeevar	Anuradha Paudwal
Shanti Kranti	"Jo Dare Woh Mare"	Hamsalekha	Indeevar	solo
Trinetra	"Kehni Hai Ek Baat"	Anand–Milind	Sameer	Sapna Mukherjee

=== 1992 ===
Film	Song	Composer(s)	Writer(s)	Co-singer(s)
Jaagruti	"Hawa Mein Kya Hai"	Anand-Milind	Sameer	K.S. Chithra
Jaagruti	"Hawa Mein Kya Hai" (Sad)	Anand-Milind	Sameer	K.S. Chithra
Jaagruti	"Hawa Mein Kya Hai" (Jhankar Beats)	Anand-Milind	Sameer	K.S. Chithra
Jaagruti	"Jalnewale To Jalte Rahenge"	Anand-Milind	Sameer	K.S. Chithra

=== 1994 ===
Film	Song	Composer(s)	Writer(s)	Co-singer(s)
Hum Aapke Hain Koun..!	"Didi Tera Devar Deewana"	Raamlaxman	Dev Kohli	Lata Mangeshkar
Hum Aapke Hain Koun..!	"Pehla Pehla Pyar Hai"	Raamlaxman	Dev Kohli	
Humse Hai Muqabala - (D)	"Gopala Gopala"	A. R. Rahman	P. K. Mishra	S. Janaki
Humse Hai Muqabala - (D)	"Premika Ne Pyar Se"	A. R. Rahman	P. K. Mishra	Udit Narayan, S. P. Pallavi
Humse Hai Muqabala - (D)	"Phoolon Jaisi Pyari"	A. R. Rahman	P. K. Mishra	

=== 1996 ===
Film	Song	Composer(s)	Writer(s)	Co-singer(s)
Duniya Dilwalon Ki - (D)	"Jaana Jaana"	A. R. Rahman		
Duniya Dilwalon Ki - (D)	"Jaari Jaa E Hawa"	A. R. Rahman		Sonu Nigam, Dominique Cerejo

=== 2013 ===
Film	Song	Composer(s)	Writer(s)	Co-singer(s)
Chennai Express	"Chennai Express"	Vishal–Shekhar	Amitabh Bhattacharya	Jonita Gandhi
