= List of awards and nominations received by S. P. Balasubrahmanyam =

S. P. Balasubrahmanyam Awards and Nominations
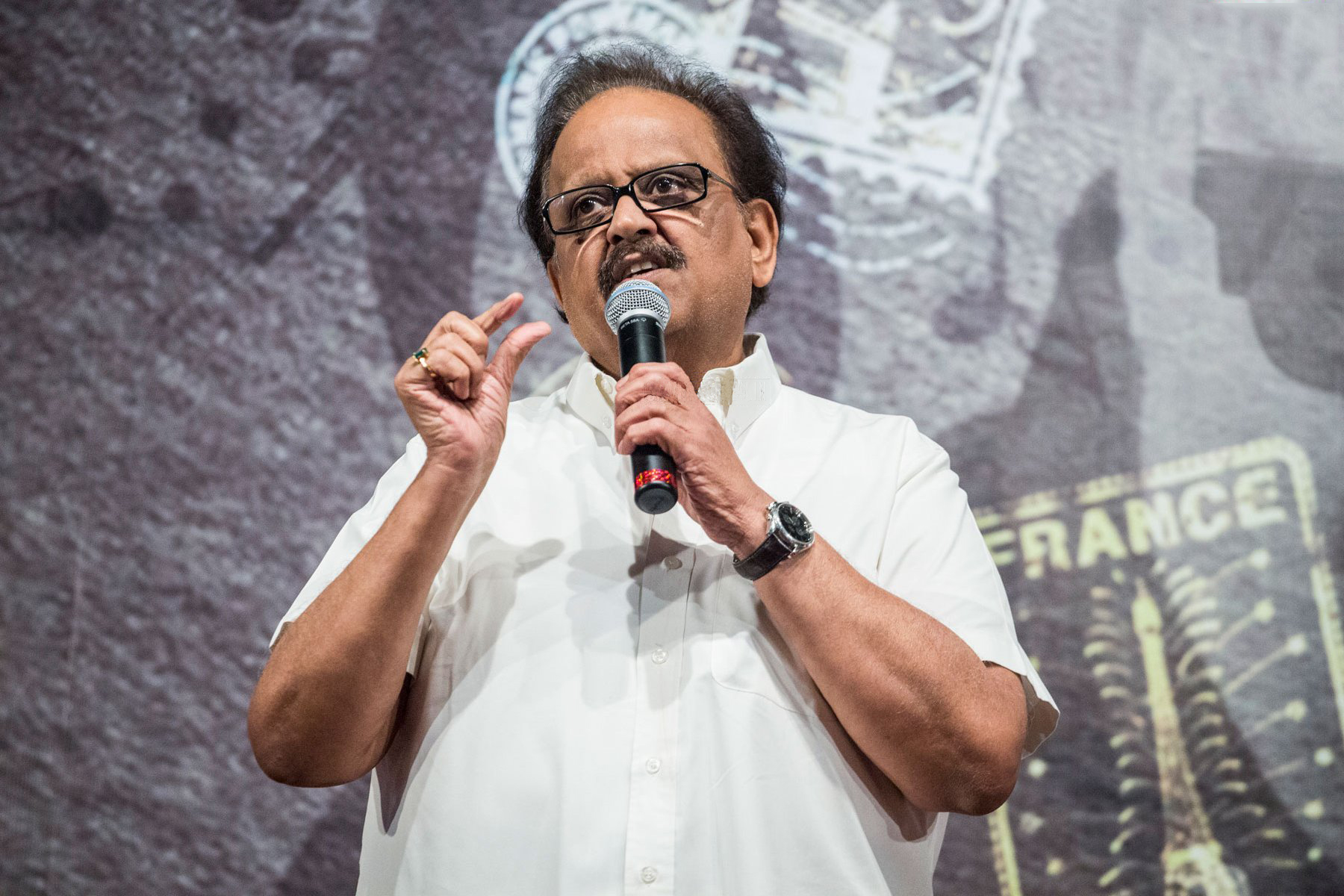
- Balasubrahmanyam in 2015
Awards & nominations
Award	Won	Nominated
Andhra Pradesh State Film Awards	25	25
Civilian honours	3	3
Filmfare Awards	1	4
Filmfare Awards South	5	11
Honorary Awards	8	8
Film Fans' Association Award (Madras)	20	20
National Film Awards	6	6
South Indian International Movie Awards	1	2
Tamil Nadu State Film Awards	4	4
Karnataka State Film Awards	3	3
Other awards	39	39
- Total number of wins and nominations
Totals	116	125

S. P. Balasubrahmanyam was an Indian playback singer, who was well known for his work in South Indian films. Having made his playback singing debut in 1966 through the Telugu film Sri Sri Sri Maryada Ramanna, he sang over 50,000 songs in multiple languages of India. He is the recipient of six National Film Awards, six Filmfare Awards South, and one Filmfare Award. Balasubrahmanyam was also a recipient of 25 Nandi Awards—Best Male Playback Singer, Best Music Director, Best Male Dubbing Artist, Special Jury Award, and Best Supporting Actor categories. He has also won four Tamil Nadu State Film Awards and three Karnataka State Film Awards.

The first of his National Awards came for his work in the 1979 musical film, Sankarabharanam. Two years later he entered the Hindi film industry through Ek Duuje Ke Liye (1981), winning the award for the second time. He also received a Filmfare nomination for Best Male Playback Singer for the film. In the subsequent years, he won the National Film Awards for Saagara Sangamam (1983) and Rudraveena (1988)—both Telugu films. In 1989, he received his first Filmfare Award for Maine Pyar Kiya. He won the first of his four South Filmfare Awards for Subha Sankalpam, a film that he produced. His first Filmfare Award in the playback singing category came for Sri Ramadasu (2006), followed by Mozhi (2007) and Aaptha Rakshaka (2010). Other honors for his singing career included Lata Mangeshkar Award, Sangeetha Ganga Award, Film Fans' Association Award. In addition, he was also honored with Padma Shri (2001) and Padma Bhushan (2011), Padma Vibhushan (2021), the fourth, third and second highest civilian honors by the Government of India. Alongside his singing career, Balasubrahmanyam worked as an actor, music composer, voice actor, and film producer.

== Civilian honours ==
Year	Award	Honouring body	References
2001	Padma Shri	Government of India	
2008	Karnataka Rajyothsava Award (Second Highest Civilian Honour of Karnataka state)	Government of Karnataka	
2011	Padma Bhushan	Government of India	
2021	Padma Vibhushan	Government of India	

== Other honours ==
Year	Award	Honouring body	Ref
1981	Kalaimamani	Government of Tamil Nadu	
1999	Honorary Doctorate	Potti Sreeramulu Telugu University	
2009	Honorary Doctorate	Sathyabama University, Chennai	
2009	Kalaprapoorna Honorary Doctorate	Andhra University	
2010	Honorary Doctorate	JNTU Anantapur	
2017	Kala Pradarshini Ghantasala Puraskar	The Ghantasala family & Kala Pradarshini, Chennai	
2017	Honorary Doctorate	The International Tamil University, United States	

== National Film Awards ==
Year	Film	Song	Language	Outcome	Ref
1979	Sankarabharanam	"Omkaara Nadhaanu"	Telugu	Won	
1981	Ek Duuje Ke Liye	"Tere Mere Beech Mein"	Hindi	Won	
1983	Saagara Sangamam	"Vedam Anuvanuvuna"	Telugu	Won	
1988	Rudraveena	"Cheppaalani Undi"	Telugu	Won	
1995	Sangeetha Sagara Ganayogi Panchakshara Gavai	"Umandu Ghumandu Ghana Gar Je Badara"	Kannada	Won	
1996	Minsaara Kanavu	"Thanga Thamarai"	Tamil	Won	

== Filmfare Awards ==
Year	Film	Song	Outcome	Ref
1981	Ek Duuje Ke Liye	"Tere Mere Beech Mein"	Nominated	
1989	Maine Pyar Kiya	"Dil Deewana"	Won	
1991	Saajan	"Tumse Milne Ki Tamanna Hai"	Nominated	
1994	Hum Aapke Hain Koun..!	"Hum Aapke Hain Koun"	Nominated	

== Filmfare Awards South ==
Year	Award	Film	Song	Language(s)	Outcome	Ref
1986	Filmfare Lifetime Achievement Award – South	"For Outstanding Achievement as a Playback Singer"		All South Regional Languages	Won	
1995	Best Picture	Subha Sankalpam		Telugu	Won	
2002	Best Male Playback Singer	Vasu	"Padana Teeyaga"	Telugu	Nominated	
2003	Best Male Playback Singer	Okariki Okaru	"Ekkadunna Vamma O Priyatama"	Telugu	Nominated	
2005	Best Male Playback Singer	Nuvvostanante Nenoddantana	"Ghal Ghal Ghal Ghal"	Telugu	Nominated	
2006	Best Male Playback Singer	Sri Ramadasu	"Adigadigo Bhadragiri"	Telugu	Won	
2007	Best Male Playback Singer	Mozhi	"Kannal Pesum Penne"	Tamil	Won	
2008	Best Male Playback Singer	Panduranga	"Matrudevobhava"	Telugu	Nominated	
2009	Best Male Playback Singer	Mahatma	"Indiramma"	Telugu	Nominated	
2010	Best Male Playback Singer	Aaptha Rakshaka	"Gharane Ghara Gharane"	Kannada	Won	
2011	Best Male Playback Singer	7aum Arivu	"Yamma yamma"	Tamil	Nominated	

== South Indian International Movie Awards ==
Year	Award	Film	Song	Language(s)	Outcome
2013	Best Male Playback Singer – Telugu	Sri Rama Rajyam	"Jagadananda Karaka"	Telugu	Nominated
2017	Lifetime Achievement Award	Various films	Various songs	Various languages	Won
2021	Special Appreciation Award	Various films	Various songs	Various languages	Won
2021	Best Male Playback Singer – Tamil	Darbar	"Chumma Kizhi"	Tamil	Nominated
2022	Best Male Playback Singer – Tamil	Annaatthe	"Annathe Annathe"	Tamil	Nominated

== Nandi Awards ==
In 2012, he received the NTR National Award for his contributions to the Indian cinema.

Year	Film(s)	Category	Outcome	Ref.
1978	Naalaga Endaro	Best Male Playback Singer	Won	
1979	Sankarabharanam	Best Male Playback Singer	Won	
1981	Premabhishekam	Best Male Playback Singer	Won	
1983	Bahudoorapu Baatasaari	Best Male Playback Singer	Won	
1984	Suvarna Sundari	Best Male Playback Singer	Won	
1986	Sirivennela	Best Male Playback Singer	Won	
1985	Mayuri	Best Music Director	Won	
1985	Mayuri	Best Male Playback Singer	Won	
1987	Abhinandana	Best Male Playback Singer	Won	
1989	Prema	Special Jury Award	Won	
1989	Neerajanam	Best Male Playback Singer	Won	
1991	Chanti	Best Male Playback Singer	Won	
1992	Bangaaru Mama	Best Male Playback Singer	Won	
1993	Mister Pellam	Best Male Playback Singer	Won	
1994	Bhairava Dweepam	Best Male Playback Singer	Won	
1996	Pavithra Bandham	Best Supporting Actor	Won	
1997	Priyaragalu	Best Male Playback Singer	Won	
1997	Annamayya	Best Dubbing Artist	Won	
2000	Sri Sai Mahima	Best Dubbing Artist	Won	
2000	Raghavayyagari Abbai	Best Male Playback Singer	Won	
2002	Vasu	Best Male Playback Singer	Won	
2003	Seetayya	Best Male Playback Singer	Won	
2005	Pellam Pichodu	Best Male Playback Singer	Won	
2009	Mahatma	Best Male Playback Singer	Won	
2012	Mithunam	Special Jury Award	Won	

== Tamil Nadu State Film Awards ==
Year	Film(s)	Category	Outcome	Ref
1969	Adimaippen, Shanti Nilayam	Best Singer	Won	
1980	Nizhalgal	Best Singer	Won	
1990	Keladi Kanmani	Best Singer	Won	
1994	Jai Hind	Best Singer	Won	

== Karnataka State Film Awards ==
Year	Film(s)	Category	Outcome
1997-98	O Mallige	Best Male Playback Singer	Won
2004-05	Srushti	Best Male Playback Singer	Won
2007-08	Savi Savi Nenapu	Best Male Playback Singer	Won

== Other awards and honors ==
- Film Fans' Association Award (Madras)—oldest association in the country—received 20 times
- "Sangeetha Ganga Award", for his contribution to Kannada Film Industry in 2001
- "Lata Mangeshkar Award" in 1999
- "Sangeeta Ganga award" in 2001
- Delhi Telugu Academy's Rashtriya Vikas Shiromani Award (Lifetime) in 2002
- "Dr. Bezawada Gopala Reddy Award", given during a function in Nellore in 2002
- "Lifetime Achievement Award" conferred during "TVS Victor Aalaapana Music Awards" function for the years 2001 and 2002, in Hyderabad in 2002
- "Swaralaya-Kairali-Yesudas" award in 2002
- "Rani Rao Balasaraswathi Award" in 2003
- "Arya Bhata Prasasthi" in 2003
- "Kalasri Award" in 2004
- "Best Playback Singer" from Maa TV, Cinemaa awards in 2004
- "Viswa Ganayogi" From Karnataka Chief Minister in 2005
- Raja-Lakshmi Award from Sri Raja-Lakshmi Foundation, Chennai in 2006
- "Best Playback Singer" from Vijay TV, Reliance Mobile Vijay Awards in 2006
- "Tansen Award" Sur Singar Sanjad (Bombay) for best classical rendition of a song from Tere Payal Mere Geeth composed by Naushad Sab
- "Best Playback Singer" from Santosham awards for the film Sri Ramadasu in 2006
- "Lifetime Achievement Award", presented by Santhosham awards in 2007
- "Basavashree Award" from Karnataka Government
- "A.P. Cinegoers Association Award for Best Singer" for Sri Bhagavatham (serial on ETV) in 2007
- "Sangeetha Saagra" from Kanchi Kamakoti Peetham, Kanchipuram in 2008
- "Karnataka Rajyotsava Prasasthi" from the Government of Karnataka on 1 November 2008
- Innumerable awards from magazines and associations fostering films
- "Lifetime Achievement Award" presented by Telugu Association of North America (TANA) in Chicago session in 2009
- "P. Susheela trust National Award" Presented on 29 November 2009
- "Kopparapu Kavula Puraskaram" from Kopparapu Kala Peetam, Visakhapatnam on 9 September 2009
- "Lifetime Achievement Award", presented by Raagalaya Music Awards (27 February 2010 at Shanmukhanad Hall, Mumbai) in 2010
- Ghantasala Award in 2010
- Great son of the soil award from Justice Rajesh Tandon, Chairperson Cyber appellate tribunal New Delhi at All India conference of intellectuals in Hyderabad on Saturday in 2010
- ANR Lifetime achievement award from Akkineni Nageswara Rao in 2010
- "Pride Of Indian Cinema" from Yuvakalavauhini, Hyderabad on 30 June 2010
- "Best playback Singer" award from "Gemini Tv Ugadi awards" 2010 for the serial "Kotha Bangaram"
- Vamsee Film awards 2010 "Best Playback Singer (male)" for the film "Mestry"
- "BIG Kannada Entertainment Awards" for the most entertaining "TV host of the year" and the programme "Yede Tumbhi Haaduvenu" being declared as the most entertaining reality show of the year
- "Santosham awards 2010" Best Playback Singer (male) for the film "Mahatma"
- "Lifetime Achievement Award" - 2011 presented by Lux Sandal CineMAA Awards on 19 June 2011 in Hyderabad
- "Isai Thendral" - Title conferred to S P Balasubrahmanyam by Botswana Tamil Cultural Association - Executive Committee (2011-2012) on 14 April 2012 in recognition towards his continuous dedication, contribution and commitment to the Indian Music and Film Industry
- The Hyderabad Times Film Awards 2011- Best Singer male for Jagadanandakaraka - Sri Ramarajyam
- "Chevalier Sivaji Ganesan Award for Excellence in Indian Cinema" given by STAR Vijay in 2011
- "Harivarasanam Award" by Government of Kerala in 2015
- "Tamizhan Award 2017" by Pudhiya Thalaimurai
- 2019 -"Gaana Vidushi" - An award bestowed, during concert at Stoke on Trent, United Kingdom, but Ragaswara.
- 6th Dakshinamurthy Nadapuraskaram, 2019, Kerala. Peringottukara Devasthanam, Thrissur
- "Sri Krishna - Yesudas Award 2018" by Sri Krishna Swara Raaga Sravanthi, Hyderabad at Ravindra Bharathi, Hyderabad, Telangana
