= Maine Pyar Kiya (soundtrack) =

Soundtrack album by Raamlaxman
- Released: 1989
- Genre: Feature film soundtrack
- Length: 64:58
- Language: Hindi
- Label: His Master's Voice
- Producer: Raamlaxman

Raamlaxman chronology
Khol De Meri Zuban (1989)	Maine Pyar Kiya (1989)	Police Public (1990)
External audio
- Maine Pyar Kiya - Full Album on YouTube

Maine Pyar Kiya is the soundtrack album to the 1989 film of the same name directed by Sooraj Barjatya and produced by Rajshri Productions, starring Salman Khan in his maiden lead role and Bhagyashree in her acting debut. The soundtrack featured 11 songs composed by Raamlaxman and written by Dev Kohli and Asad Bhopali; the album was produced and distributed under the His Master's Voice label. (Note: The label's name being changed to Saregama, which distributes cassettes, CDs and vinyl LPs under this name since 2000s.) It was one of the highest-selling Bollywood soundtrack albums of all time and fetched Raamlaxman his first Filmfare Award for Best Music Director.

== Background ==
The soundtrack to Maine Pyar Kiya featured eleven compositions by Raamlaxman (Note: original name: Vijay Patil; the name Raamlaxman was initially credited for the 1970s popular composer duo—Surendra and Vijay Patil. Post Surendra's death in 1977, Vijay continued to retain the "Raam" name in his future works.) with the lyrics written by Dev Kohli and Asad Bhopali. S. P. Balasubrahmanyam and Lata Mangeshkar recorded vocals for most of the tracks, while Lata's younger sister, Usha Mangeshkar and Shailendra Singh, the composer's favorite, had sung two tracks with Balasubrahmanyam and Lata. Sharda Sinha recorded the song "Kahe Tose Sajna". She recalled that, she was offered by Sooraj's grandfather and film producer Tarachand Barjatya to sing the track, when she was recording for a Bhojpuri film in Mumbai. Tarachand wrote a letter to send him a His Master's Voice cassette, she had, which consists of Maithili Kokil Vidyapati's compositions which he liked it. He further requested her to meet him at Rajshri's office and meet the executives. The producers stated that they liked her voice and wanted her to record the song for this film. She agreed to the request and received ₹76 (equivalent to ₹810 or US$8.40 in 2023) as remuneration. The album also featured an Antakshari (excerpts from different Bollywood songs), which was used when the characters play a game. It took three months for Sooraj to finalize those song.

== Plagiarism ==
Several songs of the film were heavily ripped from Western hits. "Aate Jaate Hanste Gaate" was a total note-by-note lift from Stevie Wonder's "I Just Called to Say I Love You". "Aaya Mausam Dosti Ka" features a guitar riff used as a prelude and interlude that is lifted from the millennial whoop (Oh Oh Oh Oh Oh Oh Ho portion) from the song "Tarzan Boy" by Baltimora from the album Living in the Background. Another song from the movie that was inspired from a western hit was "Mere Rang Mein Rangne Wali". The keyboard riff that plays at the initiation of the song (peculiarly picturised on a saxophone) is ripped from the keyboard riff of "The Final Countdown" by the Swedish band Europe. The first few lines of the song, "Mere Rang Mein" to the peak at "Mere Sawalon ka Jawab Do", were also partly inspired from the initial portions of Francis Lai's "Theme from Love Story".

== Commercial reception and legacy ==
The soundtrack was a commercial success, becoming the best-selling soundtrack of the year and decade, sharing with Chandni (1989). The makers and the music label executives spent around ₹10 lakh (equivalent to ₹1.1 crore or US$110,000 in 2023) for publicity in radio stations, and the His Master's Voice label gained huge profits after the album's record-breaking sales. It sold around 10 million units, also becoming the label's highest-selling album, with 5 million cassettes being sold. It gave a thrust to the career of Raamlaxman, who, although existed since the 1970s and was composing for mainstream movies, was yet to find popularity.

== Track listing ==
No.	Title	Lyrics	Artist(s)	Length
1.	"Mere Rang Me Rangne Wali"	Dev Kohli	S. P. Balasubrahmanyam	6:52
2.	"Dil Deewana" (Male)	Asad Bhopali	S. P. Balasubrahmanyam	5:21
3.	"Dil Deewana" (Duet)	Asad Bhopali	S. P. Balasubrahmanyam, Lata Mangeshkar	1:16
4.	"Aate Jaate Hanste Gaate"	Dev Kohli	S. P. Balasubrahmanyam, Lata Mangeshkar	3:22
5.	"Kabootar Ja Ja Ja"	Dev Kohli	S. P. Balasubrahmanyam, Lata Mangeshkar	8:21
6.	"Aaja Shaam Hone Aayi"	Dev Kohli	S. P. Balasubrahmanyam, Lata Mangeshkar	5:15
7.	"Maine Pyar Kiya"	Asad Bhopali	S. P. Balasubrahmanyam, Lata Mangeshkar	6:49
8.	"Aaya Mausam Dosti Ka"	Asad Bhopali	S. P. Balasubrahmanyam, Lata Mangeshkar, Usha Mangeshkar, Shailendra Singh	6:45
9.	"Antakshari"	Traditional	S. P. Balasubrahmanyam, Lata Mangeshkar, Usha Mangeshkar, Shailendra Singh	9:07
10.	"Dil Deewana" (Female)	Asad Bhopali	Lata Mangeshkar	5:55
11.	"Kahe Toh Se Sajne"	Asad Bhopali	Sharda Sinha	5:54
Total length:				64:58

== Accolades ==
Award	Category	Recipient(s) and nominee(s)	Result	Ref(s)
35th Filmfare Awards	Best Music Director	Raamlaxman	Won	
35th Filmfare Awards	Best Lyricist	Asad Bhopali for "Dil Deewana"	Won	
35th Filmfare Awards	Best Lyricist	Dev Kohli for "Aate Jaate Hanste Gaate"	Nominated	
35th Filmfare Awards	Best Male Playback Singer	S. P. Balasubrahmanyam for "Dil Deewana"	Won	
