= Hum Aapke Hain Koun..! =

1994 Indian film by Sooraj Barjatya

- Theatrical release poster
- Directed by: Sooraj Barjatya
- Written by: Sooraj Barjatya
- Based on: Nadiya Ke Paar by Keshav Prasad Mishra; Kohbar Ki Shart by Keshav Prasad Mishra
- Produced by: Ajit Kumar Barjatya; Kamal Kumar Barjatya; Rajkumar Barjatya
- Starring: Madhuri Dixit; Salman Khan; Anupam Kher
- Cinematography: Rajan Kinagi
- Edited by: Mukhtar Ahmed
- Music by: Raamlaxman
- Production company: Rajshri Productions
- Distributed by: Rajshri Productions
- Release date: 5 August 1994
- Running time: 199 minutes (Note: It could also be 185 or 196 minutes, depending on the version.)
- Country: India
- Language: Hindi
- Budget: ₹6 crore
- Box office: ₹128 crore

Hum Aapke Hain Koun..! (HAHK, transl. Who am I to you?) is a 1994 Indian Hindi-language musical romantic drama film written and directed by Sooraj Barjatya and produced by Rajshri Productions. The film stars Madhuri Dixit and Salman Khan and celebrates Indian wedding traditions by means of a story of a married couple and the relationship between their families; a story about sacrificing one's love for one's family. The basic plot is based on the studio's earlier film Nadiya Ke Paar (1982), which was based on Keshav Prasad Mishra's Hindi novel Kohbar Ki Shart. The film features music by Raamlaxman who also composed a 14-song soundtrack, an unusually large number of songs for that period.

Hum Aapke Hain Koun..! was released on 5 August 1994, and became the highest-grossing film of the year, having grossed between ₹111.63 and ₹128 crore worldwide. It also became the highest-grossing Indian film at the time of its release. It contributed to a change in the Indian film industry, with new methods of distribution and a turn towards less violent stories. It was the first film to gross over ₹100 crore in India, and when adjusted for inflation, is the highest-grossing Indian film of the 1990s and also one of the highest-earning Indian cinema films ever. Box Office India described it as "the biggest blockbuster of the modern era." The film was also dubbed into Telugu as Premalayam and was a major success, running for over 200 days in theaters.

At the 42nd National Film Awards, Hum Aapke Hain Koun..! won two awards, including the Best Popular Film Providing Wholesome Entertainment. At the 40th Filmfare Awards, the film received a leading 14 nominations, and won five awards, including Best Film, Best Director (Barjatya), Best Actress (Dixit) and Special Award (Lata Mangeshkar for "Didi Tera Devar Deewana"). It also won six awards at the newly introduced Screen Awards.

Hum Aapke Hain Koun..! is considered as one of the most influential films in the Indian film industry as well as in pop culture. It made a lasting impact on wedding celebrations in India, which often include songs and games from the film. It is credited as being a defining moment in Hindi cinema's box office history, and the beginning of a revolution in the Indian film distribution system.

== Plot ==
Prem and Rajesh are orphaned brothers who live with their paternal uncle, Kailashnath, a wealthy industrialist. Rajesh manages the family's thriving business, and the family begins searching for a suitable bride for him. Their maternal uncle suggests a match with the family of Kailashnath's old college friend, Siddharth Choudhury, a respected professor. Siddharth and his wife, Madhu, have two daughters: the gentle, mature Pooja and the vivacious, free-spirited Nisha. Intrigued by the suggestion, Kailashnath reaches out to Siddharth, and the two families quickly arrange a marriage between Rajesh and Pooja.

During the initial wedding preparations, Prem and Nisha meet for the first time. They instantly clash, engaging in a series of lighthearted pranks, playful bickering, and mutual teasing. As the elaborate wedding festivities unfold, their constant mischief evolves into mutual affection, though neither openly confesses their feelings.

Pooja and Rajesh's marriage brings immense joy to both households. In time, Pooja becomes pregnant. When her parents are unable to travel for the traditional baby shower, they send Nisha to stay with the family in their stead. Nisha remains with the family through the birth of Pooja and Rajesh's son. During this extended stay, Nisha and Prem realize they have deeply fallen in love, though they choose to keep their relationship a secret from the rest of the family. When Siddharth and Madhu finally arrive to take Nisha home, the time comes for them to part. Before leaving, Prem and Nisha privately promise each other that they will find a way to be together forever.

Sometime later, Pooja returns to her parental home for a visit, accompanied by Prem. Upon their arrival, Prem confides in Pooja and tells her that he and Nisha are secretly in love. Delighted by the news, Pooja enthusiastically gives Nisha a family necklace as a token of approval and vows to convince the elders to arrange their marriage. However, shortly after Prem departs, tragedy strikes: Pooja slips on a staircase, suffers a fatal head injury, and passes away, leaving both families completely shattered.

In the wake of the tragedy, Nisha steps in to look after Pooja's infant son, showing him immense maternal care. Observing her devotion to the child, Siddharth and Kailashnath conclude that the best way to secure the baby's future is for Nisha to marry the widowed Rajesh.

Nisha overhears her parents discussing her impending marriage into Kailashnath's family. Assuming they have discovered her secret and are arranging her marriage to Prem, she happily consents. It is only later, during a pre-nuptial ceremony, that Nisha realizes she is actually being betrothed to Rajesh. Heartbroken but deeply loyal to their families, Prem and Nisha independently resolve to sacrifice their love to ensure the happiness of Rajesh and the well-being of the infant.

Moments before the wedding ceremony is set to begin, Nisha hands the dog, Tuffy, the necklace Pooja had given her along with a letter written to Prem. She sends Tuffy to deliver them to Prem. But Tuffy delivers this letter to Rajesh instead. Upon reading the letter and seeing the necklace, Rajesh realizes the profound romantic sacrifice Prem and Nisha were about to make for his sake.

Instead of proceeding with the ceremony, Rajesh takes the letter and necklace directly to the family elders to reveal the truth. He confronts Prem and Nisha about their secret, steps aside willingly, and implores the elders to bless the rightful union between the two lovers instead. With the enthusiastic consent of both families, Prem and Nisha are married, restoring happiness to the household.

== Cast ==
- Madhuri Dixit as Nisha Choudhury, Prem's Love interest
- Salman Khan as Prem
- Mohnish Bahl as Rajesh, Prem's Elder Brother
- Renuka Shahane as Pooja Choudhury, Rajesh's wife and Nisha's Sister
- Alok Nath as Kailashnath, Prem and Rajesh's uncle
- Anupam Kher as Professor Siddharth Choudhury, father of Pooja and Nisha
- Reema Lagoo as Mrs. Madhukala Choudhury, mother of Pooja and Nisha
- Satish Shah as Doctor Chacha, aka Chacha-Jaan, a family friend of Kailashnath
- Himani Shivpuri as Dr. Razia, aka Chachi-Jaan, Doctor Chacha's wife
- Dilip Joshi as Bhola, Pooja and Nisha's Cousin
- Laxmikant Berde as Lallu Prasad
- Priya Arun as Chameli
- Redo as Tuffy, Prem's dog
- Ajit Vachani as Professor Kashyap, Prem's and Rajesh's maternal uncle
- Bindu as Bhagwanti, Professor's wife & Prem's and Rajesh's maternal aunt
- Sahila Chadha as Rita, Bhagwanti's Niece and a friend of Prem (Friendly Appearance)
- Dinesh Hingoo as Manager Chacha

== Production ==
Director/writer Sooraj Barjatya devoted one year and nine months to write the screenplay of Hum Aapke Hain Koun..!. He spent the first five months trying to write another Maine Pyar Kiya, but then started over after his father Rajkumar Barjatya suggested that he rework one of the family company Rajshri Productions earlier offerings. Hum Aapke Hain Koun..! then became a loose adaptation of their 1982 production Nadiya Ke Paar. Barjatya used musical numbers to avoid treating some situations in a cliché manner, which resulted in so many songs that there were complaints during initial screenings of the film concerning its length and number of songs. Barjayta's grandfather, company founder Tarachand Barjatya, loved the song "Dhiktana" so much that the film was nearly given that title. Barjatya later told India Abroad, "My attempt in this movie has been to re-expose the cinema-going public to the quintessential family life... not to make people feel that they have come to see a movie, but make them feel as if they have come to visit a big joint family that is preparing for a wedding". The story was constructed differently than what was popular at the time. There were no villains, violence, or battles between good and evil. From conception to finished product, the film took four years.

The producers/distributors exercised a higher than normal level of control over their work. There was a limited release, a new form of television publicity, safeguards against video piracy, and a delay in the releasing of video tapes.

== Music ==
The soundtrack for Hum Aapke Hain Koun..! was composed by Raamlaxman who had earlier given music for Rajshri's Maine Pyar Kiya, with lyrics by Ravinder Rawal and Dev Kohli. It was produced under the His Master's Voice label and featured veteran playback singers such as Lata Mangeshkar, S. P. Balasubrahmanyam, Kumar Sanu, Udit Narayan, Shailendra Singh and Sharda Sinha. The song "Didi Tera Devar Deewana" became one of the most popular film songs ever, and was on the charts for over a year. The soundtrack was highly successful upon release, becoming one of the highest-selling Bollywood soundtracks of all time.

== Release ==
Hum Aapke Hain Koun..! premiered at Liberty Cinema in South Mumbai on 5 August 1994; it eventually ran there for over 100 weeks. The film initially saw a very limited release, also showing at the Regal and Eros theatres, with only 26 prints total. Eventually, it started to appear in many more theatres. When initial viewers complained about the film's length, 2 of the 14 song sequences were removed. These were later restored when film goers were found to enjoy all of the songs. Early reviewers of Hum Aapke Hain Koun..! predicted that it would be a huge flop; hence the industry was stunned when it went on to become the most successful film of all time up to that point.

== Reception ==
=== Box office ===
Hum Aapke Hain Koun..! is one of the biggest grossers ever in the history of Indian cinema, and is said to have changed film business forever in the country. Made on a budget of around ₹42.5 million ($1.4 million), it grossed over ₹700 million in its first 20 weeks, becoming the highest-grossing film in India up until then. Within 18 weeks, it grossed over ₹10 million in every territory it released, a feat previously achieved by Sholay (1975) and Coolie (1983). It went on to gross an estimated ₹1.75 billion in India, making it the first to gross over ₹1 billion. Box Office India gave it the verdict "All Time Blockbuster", and described it as "the biggest blockbuster of the modern era." Much of the success was due to repeat business. For example, painter M. F. Husain was reported to have seen the film over 60 times. The film's domestic net income was ₹725 million, which adjusted for inflation is equivalent to ₹7.11 billion ($74 million), making it the highest-grossing Hindi film in India since Sholay. Hum Aapke Hain Koun sold 74 million tickets in India, giving it the highest domestic footfalls of any Hindi film released since the 1990s.

The film was also dubbed into the Telugu-language and released with the title Premalayam and was very successful there, running for more than 200 days in theatres. The film earned about ₹200 million (US$6.37 million) abroad in overseas markets.

Worldwide, the film grossed over $63.8 million (₹1.95 billion) in its first year, for which it was awarded the Guinness World Record for "Highest grossing Indian movie". By 1996, the film's total worldwide gross had crossed ₹2 billion ($66 million), with total estimates going up to ₹2.5 billion ($82 million).

=== Critical reception ===
India Abroad called it a "cloyingly familial and touchingly sad melodrama replete with typical Indian social situations". Tripat Narayanan of New Straits Times criticised the plot as "paper-thin" and the climax scenes as clichéd, but said Barajiya handled them so well that Shahane's "smiling bride face is immortalised as an epitome of goodness." He appreciated the performances of Dixit and Lagoo, concluding that "what really holds the film together is the editing."

Redo, an Indian Spitz, received favourable recognition as Tuffy the dog. He was included in the "Best Pets in Hindi films" list compiled by Daily News and Analysis. After the film, Redo was reportedly adopted by Dixit.

== Accolades ==
Hum Aapke Hain Koun..! won the National Film Award for Best Popular Film Providing Wholesome Entertainment. The film received a leading 13 nominations at the 40th Filmfare Awards, and won 5 awards including Best Film, Best Director, and Best Actress, making it one of the biggest winners of the year. Lata Mangeshkar, who sang more than 10 songs in the film, had long retired from accepting awards, but the public demand for the song "Didi Tera Devar Deewana" was such that she received the Filmfare Special Award that year. The film also won major awards at the newly introduced Screen Awards, where it won six awards.

Award	Category	Nominee	Result	Ref.
42nd National Film Awards	Best Popular Film Providing Wholesome Entertainment	Sooraj Barjatya	Won	
42nd National Film Awards	Best Choreography	Jay Borade	Won	
40th Filmfare Awards	Best Film	Sooraj Barjatya	Won	
40th Filmfare Awards	Best Director	Sooraj Barjatya	Won	
40th Filmfare Awards	Best Screenplay	Sooraj Barjatya	Won	
40th Filmfare Awards	Best Actor	Salman Khan	Nominated	
40th Filmfare Awards	Best Actress	Madhuri Dixit	Won	
40th Filmfare Awards	Best Supporting Actor	Anupam Kher	Nominated	
40th Filmfare Awards	Best Supporting Actor	Mohnish Behl	Nominated	
40th Filmfare Awards	Best Supporting Actress	Reema Lagoo	Nominated	
40th Filmfare Awards	Best Supporting Actress	Renuka Shahane	Nominated	
40th Filmfare Awards	Best Comedian	Laxmikant Berde	Nominated	
40th Filmfare Awards	Special Award	Lata Mangeshkar for "Didi Tera Devar Deewana"	Won	
40th Filmfare Awards	Best Music Director	Raamlaxman	Nominated	
40th Filmfare Awards	Best Lyricist	Dev Kohli for "Hum Aapke Hain Koun...!"	Nominated	
40th Filmfare Awards	Best Male Playback Singer	S. P. Balasubramaniam for "Hum Aapke Hain Koun...!"	Nominated	
1995 Screen Awards	Best Film	Sooraj Barjatya	Won	
1995 Screen Awards	Best Director	Sooraj Barjatya	Won	
1995 Screen Awards	Best Screenplay	Sooraj Barjatya	Won	
1995 Screen Awards	Best Actress	Madhuri Dixit	Won	
1995 Screen Awards	Best Female Playback Singer	Lata Mangeshkar for "Maye Ni Maye"	Won	
1995 Screen Awards	Best Editing	Mukhtar Ahmed	Won	

== Analysis ==
Author Kovid Gupta classified Hum Aapke Hain Koun..! as a film that bridges the gap between traditionalism and modernity. He discussed the songs of the films in particular, and the "manifestation of romance under the acceptance and blessings of the family, in specific, the elder sister-in-law". Patricia Uberoi called the film a family film in two ways; it is about family relationships, and it is suitable for the entire family to watch. She said that the film is not about the two leads, but about the family, an ideal family. Tejaswini Ganti has called the film a "paean to filial duty" for how the children are willing to sacrifice their love for the good of their families. The family relationships are also noted for being different from the normal cinematic families of the time due to their mutual civility.

Rediff.com noted that "Though the film was initially dismissed as a wedding video, its success indicated that post-liberalisation, Indian audiences still clung to the comfort of the familiar." Jigna Desai said that the film's popularity was due to interactions of the families around the traditional folk wedding practices. In his study on the response to the film, academic Vamsee Juluri concluded that the celebration of the family is HAHK's "most useful contribution to history".

== Legacy and influence ==
Hum Aapke Hain Koun..! is credited as being a defining moment in Hindi cinema's box office history, and the beginning of a revolution in the Indian film distribution system. When it was released, cinema was in decline in India due to improved cable television, home video, and film piracy. The film was originally released in only a small number of theatres that agreed to upgrade their facilities. Due to widespread demand for the film, many other theatres upgraded in order to get the film. Although ticket prices were raised, the upgraded theatres brought people back who had been lost to television. Also, the film's lack of vulgarity was a sign to middle-class family patrons that they could return to the theatre. This film, in addition to the following year's Dilwale Dulhania Le Jayenge, contributed to an increase in Indian cinema attendance of 40% in just two years.

The film was so successful that it literally gave the term blockbuster new meaning in India. Box Office India said, "Hum Aapke Hain Koun..! [...] took business for films released afterwards to another level. To put into perspective how business changed [...] before Hum Aapke Hain Koun..! an all India share of 10 crore for a big film was regarded as blockbuster business but after Hum Aapke Hain Koun..! the blockbuster business figure went to 20 crore."

Hum Aapke Hain Koun..! influenced many subsequent Hindi films. The film was also a trendsetter for glamorous family dramas and NRI-related films, and started Bollywood's "big-fat-wedding-film" trend. In 1998 a theatre company in London, where the film had played for a year, staged a production based on the film titled Fourteen Songs, Two Weddings and a Funeral. Planet Bollywood has noted that no wedding is complete without some songs from this film, and it has been used as a script to design wedding plans. For years afterwards, women wanted to wear a purple sari like the one worn by Madhuri Dixit in the song "Didi Tera Devar Deewana".

It also influenced many filmmakers such as Aditya Chopra and Karan Johar. Karan Johar named it as the one film that changed his life. He said, "After seeing Hum Aapke Hain Koun..! I realized Indian cinema is about values, tradition, subtlety, romance. There is so much soul in it. [...] I decided to go ahead and be a filmmaker only after watching this film." Hum Aapke Hain Koun..! belongs to a small collection of films, including Kismet (1943), Mother India (1957), Mughal-e-Azam (1960) and Sholay (1975), which are repeatedly watched throughout India and are viewed as definitive Hindi films with cultural significance.

== Bibliography ==
- Desai, Jigna (2003). Beyond Bollywood: The Cultural Politics of South Asian Diasporic Film. Routledge. ISBN 978-1-135-88720-9.
- Ganti, Tejaswini (2012). Producing Bollywood: Inside the Contemporary Hindi Film Industry. Duke University Press. ISBN 978-0-8223-5213-6.
- Ganti, Tejaswini (2013). Bollywood: A Guidebook to Popular Hindi Cinema. Routledge. ISBN 978-1-136-84929-9.
- Juluri, Vamsee (1999). "Global weds local: the reception of Hum Aapke Hain Koun". European Journal of Cultural Studies. 2 (2): 231–248. doi:10.1177/136754949900200205. S2CID 145677995.
- Mishra, Vijay (2002). Bollywood Cinema: Temples of Desire. Routledge. ISBN 978-0-415-93015-4. Archived from the original on 7 April 2023.
- Morcom, Anna (2007). Hindi film songs and the cinema. Ashgate Publishing, Ltd. ISBN 978-0-7546-5198-7.
- Stringer, Julian (2013). Movie Blockbusters. Routledge. ISBN 978-1-136-40821-2.
- Uberoi, Patricia (2008). "Imagining the family". In Dudrah, Rajinder; Desai, Jigna (eds.). The Bollywood Reader. McGraw-Hill International. ISBN 978-0-335-22212-4.
