= 35th Filmfare Awards =

1990 awards for Hindi cinema

- Date: 1990

Highlights
- Best Film: Maine Pyaar Kiya
- Critics Award for Best Film: Khayal Gatha
- Most awards: Maine Pyaar Kiya (6)
- Most nominations: Maine Pyaar Kiya (12)

The 35th Filmfare Awards for Hindi cinema were held in 1990.

Maine Pyaar Kiya led the ceremony with 12 nominations, followed by Chandni with 10 nominations, Ram Lakhan with 9 nominations, and Parinda and Tridev with 6 nominations each.

Sooraj Barjatya's Maine Pyaar Kiya won 6 awards, including Best Film, thus becoming the most-awarded film at the ceremony.

Vidhu Vinod Chopra's Parinda was the other big winner on the night with 5 awards, including Best Director (for Vidhu Vinod Chopra), Best Actor (for Jackie Shroff) and Best Supporting Actor (for Nana Patekar).

This rivalry between Sooraj Barjatya and Vidhu Vinod Chopra resurfaced at the 40th Filmfare Awards, where once again Barjatya's Hum Aapke Hain Koun..! beat out Chopra's 1942: A Love Story for Best Film.

Sridevi received dual nominations for Best Actress for her performances in Chaalbaaz and Chandni, winning for the former.

== Main awards ==
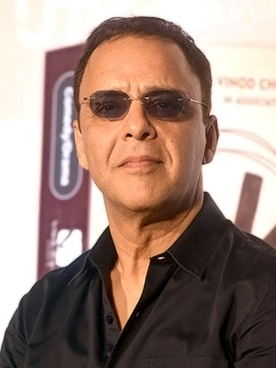
Vidhu Vinod Chopra — Best Director winner for Parinda

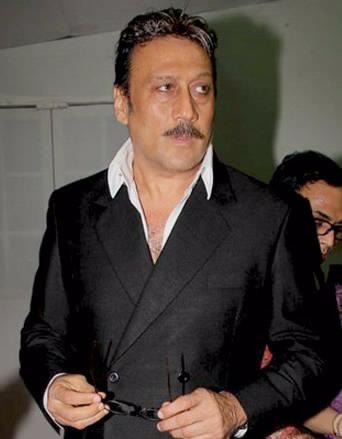
Jackie Shroff — Best Actor winner for Parinda

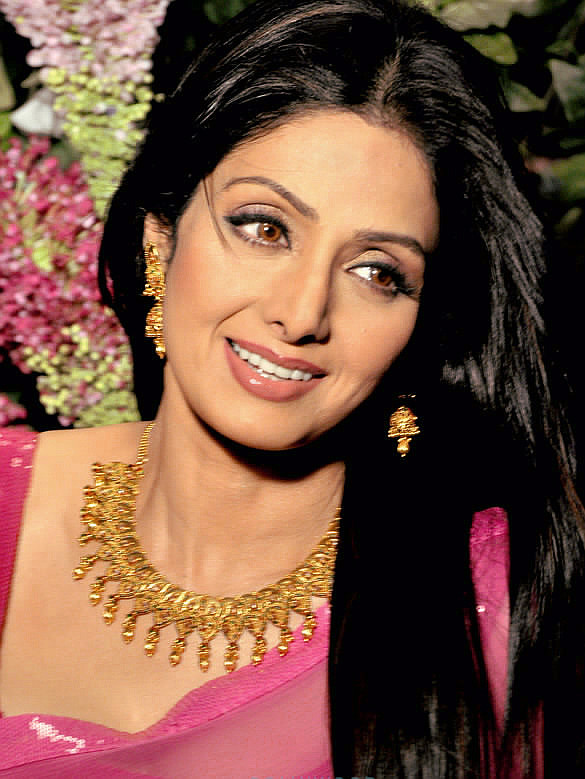
Sridevi — Best Actress winner for Chaalbaaz

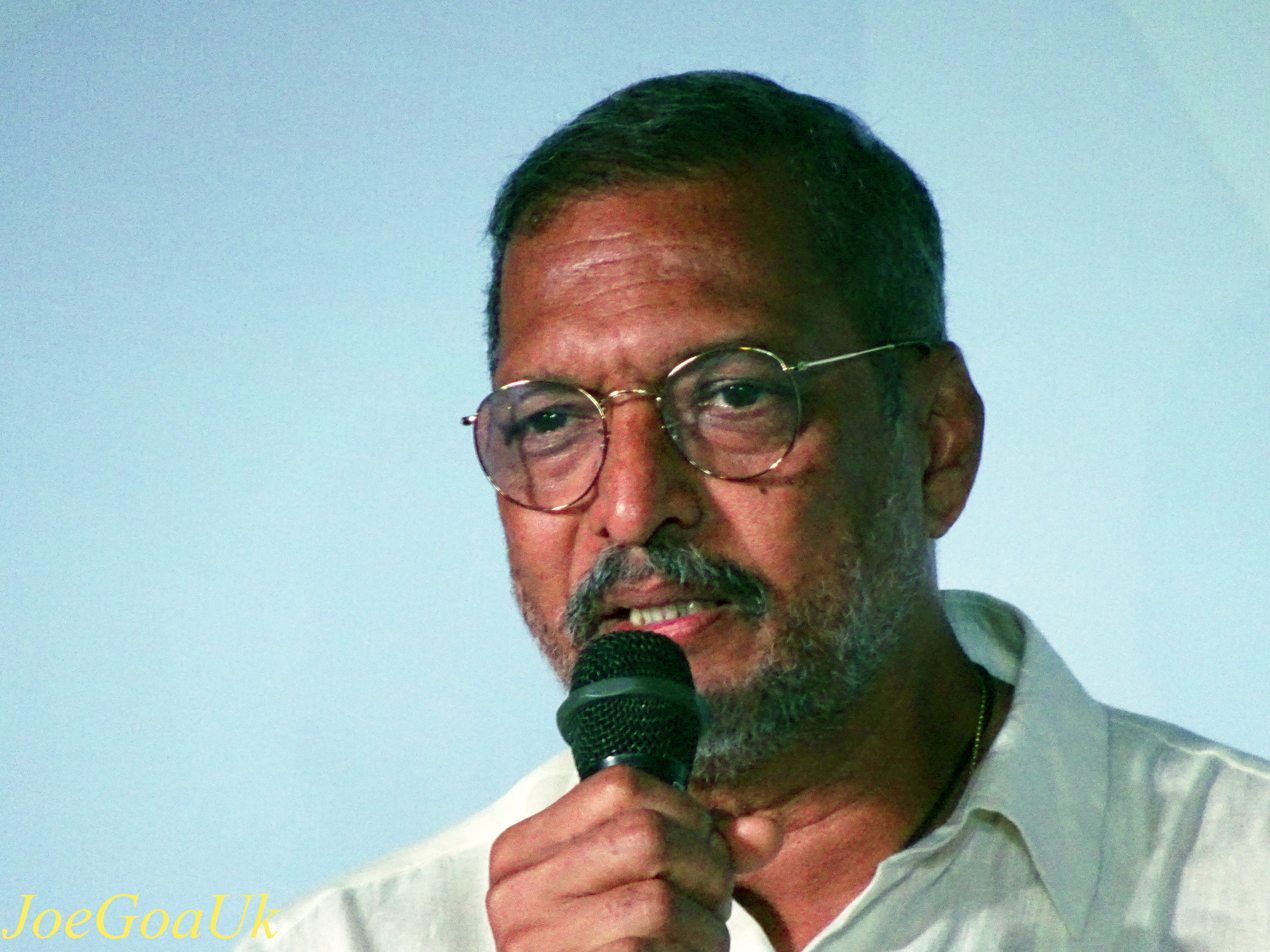
Nana Patekar — Best Supporting Actor winner for Parinda

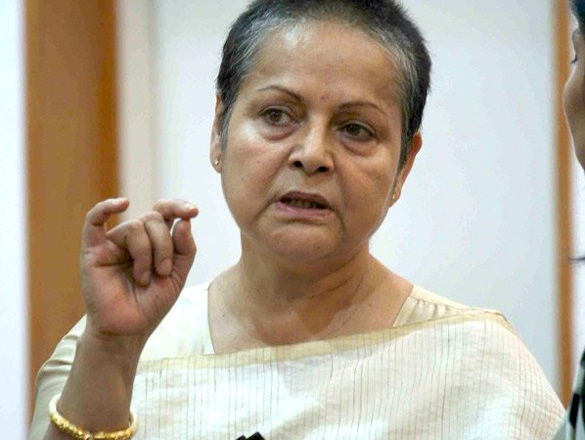
Raakhee — Best Supporting Actress winner for Ram Lakhan

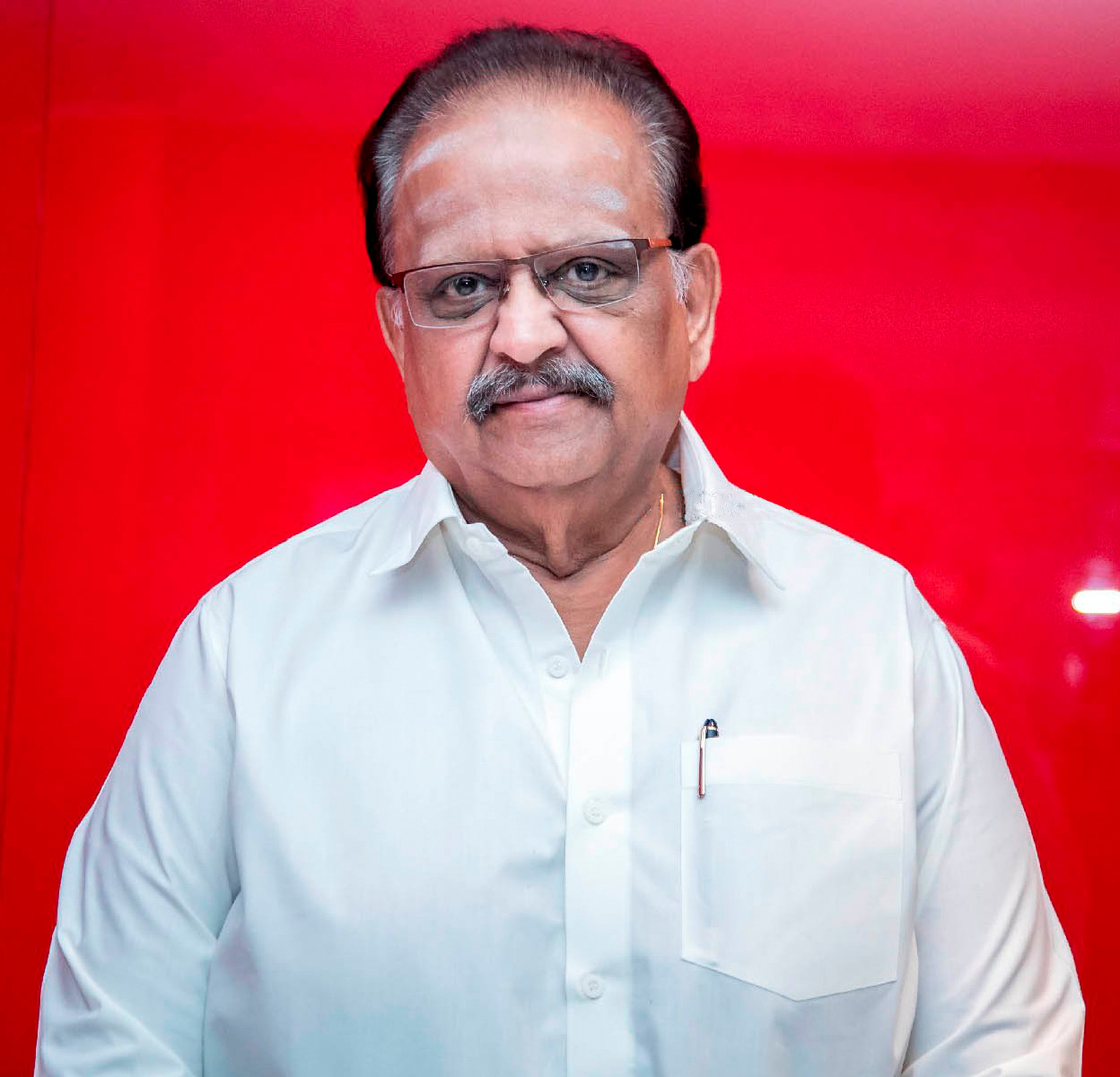
S. P. Balasubrahmanyam — Best Playback singer, Male winner for "Dil Deewana" (Maine Pyaar Kiya)

Best Film	Best Director
Maine Pyaar Kiya; Chandni; Parinda; Ram Lakhan; Salaam Bombay	Vidhu Vinod Chopra – Parinda; Mira Nair – Salaam Bombay; Sooraj Barjatya – Maine Pyaar Kiya; Subhash Ghai – Ram Lakhan; Yash Chopra – Chandni
Best Actor	Best Actress
Jackie Shroff – Parinda; Aamir Khan – Raakh; Anil Kapoor – Eeshwar; Rishi Kapoor – Chandni; Salman Khan – Maine Pyaar Kiya	Sridevi – Chaalbaaz; Bhagyashree – Maine Pyaar Kiya; Madhuri Dixit – Prem Pratigyaa; Sridevi – Chandni; Vijayashanti – Eeshwar
Best Supporting Actor	Best Supporting Actress
Nana Patekar – Parinda; Amrish Puri – Tridev; Mohsin Khan – Batwara; Pankaj Kapoor – Raakh; Vinod Khanna – Chandni	Raakhee – Ram Lakhan; Anita Kanwar – Salaam Bombay; Reema Lagoo – Maine Pyaar Kiya; Sujata Mehta – Yateem; Waheeda Rehman – Chandni
Best Comedian	Best Story
Anupam Kher – Ram Lakhan (tie); Satish Kaushik – Ram Lakhan (tie); Kader Khan – Sikka; Laxmikant Berde – Maine Pyar Kiya	K. Viswanath – Eeshwar; Aditya Bhattacharya – Raakh; J. P. Dutta – Batwara; Joy Augustine – Goonj
Best Music Director	Best Lyricist
Raamlaxman – Maine Pyar Kiya; Kalyanji-Anandji and Viju Shah – Tridev; Laxmikant–Pyarelal – Ram Lakhan; Shiv-Hari – Chandni	Asad Bhopali – "Dil Deewana" – Maine Pyar Kiya; Anand Bakshi – "Lagi Aaj Saawan" – Chandni; Dev Kohli – "Aate Jaate" – Maine Pyar Kiya
Best Male Playback Singer	Best Female Playback Singer
S. P. Balasubrahmanyam – "Dil Deewana" – Maine Pyar Kiya; Amit Kumar – "Tirchhi Topiwale" – Tridev; Mohammed Aziz – "My Name is Lakhan" – Ram Lakhan; Suresh Wadkar – "Lagi Aaj Saawan Ki" – Chandni	Sapna Mukherjee – "Tirchhi Topiwale" – Tridev; Alisha Chinai – "Raat Bhar" – Tridev; Anuradha Paudwal – "Bekhabar Bewafaa" – Ram Lakhan; Anuradha Paudwal – "Tera Naam Liya" – Ram Lakhan; Kavita Krishnamurthy – "Na Jaane Kahan Se Aayi Hai" – Chaalbaaz

=== Most Sensational Debut ===
Salman Khan & Sooraj Barjatya – Maine Pyar Kiya

=== Lux Face of the Year ===
Bhagyashree – Maine Pyar Kiya

=== Best Screenplay ===
Shiv Kumar Subramaniam – Parinda

=== Best Choreography ===
Saroj Khan – "Na Jaane Kahan Se Aayi Hai" – Chaalbaaz

=== Best Cinematography ===
Chandni

=== Best Editing ===
Parinda

=== Best Sound ===
Tridev

== Critics' awards ==
=== Best Film ===
Khayal Gatha

=== Best Documentary ===
Siddeswari

== Biggest Winners ==
- Maine Pyaar Kiya – 7/13
- Parinda – 5/6
- Ram Lakhan – 3/9
- Chaalbaaz – 2/3
- Tridev – 2/6
- Chandni – 1/10
- Eeshwar – 1/3

== See also ==
- 37th Filmfare Awards
- 36th Filmfare Awards
- Filmfare Awards
