= Didi Tera Devar Deewana =

Single by Lata Mangeshkar and S. P. Balasubrahmanyam

from the album Hum Aapke Hain Koun..! soundtrack
- Released: 1994
- Recorded: 1994
- Genre: Filmi, Hindustani classical music
- Length: 8:05
- Label: Saregama; Rajshri Music
- Composer: Raamlaxman
- Lyricist: Dev Kohli
- Producer: Rajshri Productions

"Didi Tera Devar Deewana" (transl. Sister, your brother-in-law is crazy) is a 1994 Hindi-language filmi song performed by Lata Mangeshkar and S. P. Balasubrahmanyam for the soundtrack of the 1994 Indian musical romantic drama film Hum Aapke Hain Koun..!. The track was composed by Raamlaxman, while lyrics were written by Dev Kohli. Hum Aapke Hain Koun..! was written and directed by Sooraj R. Barjatya and produced under the banner of Rajshri Productions. The music video of "Didi Tera Devar Deewana" shows the film's ensemble cast and leads Madhuri Dixit and Salman Khan dancing at a baby shower ceremony.

The song became very famous after its release, with it reaching various music charts and bagging the Filmfare Special Award for Mangeshkar. The purple jaded satin saree designed by Anna Singh and sported by Dixit in the video trended in the markets, being also merchandised. Dixit's dance and looks throughout the clip were met with highly positive reviews. After watching the song's video, artist M. F. Husain found his muse in Dixit and went on to paint a series of paintings on her.

== Music video ==
The video of the song features the majority of the film's cast at a celebration event where this song is being performed. To entertain the attendees that have arrived at Pooja's (Renuka Shahane) baby shower, her sister Nisha (Madhuri Dixit) and her husband's cousin Rita (Sahila Chadha) arrange a comic skit. While Nisha is presented as a pregnant lady with a pillow stuffed belly, Rita is seen in a young man's get-up which resembles that of Prem (Salman Khan), Pooja's devar (younger brother-in-law). Throughout the song's lyrics, Nisha tells everyone of how Prem is deewana (crazy) and always tries to woo girls. The fake Prem, i.e. Rita, enacts the same alongside by flirting and teasing all the ladies, especially Nisha. He also hits Nisha's bum with a marigold flower using a slingshot. Afterwards, the fake Prem is shown being beaten by all the ladies present. Just then, the real Prem, who was secretly watching the comic skit, comes in and hits Nisha's bum again with a marigold flower. Following this, Prem jumps off the balcony and hangs onto the chandelier. Afraid of being caught red handed in imitating him, Nisha and Rita try to run away. Surprisingly, Prem begs pardon for his behaviour towards Nisha. The video ends with Prem faking a pregnant lady in lingerie. The clip has a large group of female dancers dancing in-sync in the background. Amongst the prominent star cast of the film, Bindu, Himani Shivpuri, Priya Arun and Laxmikant Berde are also seen throughout the video.

== Production ==
Written by Dev Kohli, the song is composed by Raamlaxman and performed by Lata Mangeshkar and S. P. Balasubrahmanyam. Hum Aapke Hain Koun..! was Sooraj R. Barjatya's second film, following Maine Pyar Kiya, which also featured Kohli, Raamlaxman, Mangeshkar and Balasubrahmanyam. Raamlaxman had earlier been known for his association with the Marathi films of Dada Kondke. He had about 50 sessions with Barjatya, while the finishing of the script, and finalizing the music and recording of all songs took 3 months. According to The Times Of India, "Didi Tera Devar Deewana" is inspired by Ustad Nusrat Fateh Ali Khan's song "Saare Nabian". When Hum Aapke Hain Koun..! was released in Pakistan, the words "Hai Raam" were omitted from the lyrics.

The film marked the beginning of Bollywood's family films in the 1990s and narrated a story of an Indian elite family. The sets of Hum Aapke Hain Koun..! mixed the contemporary designs, also saturating it with Hindu iconography and the palatial architecture was shown to be filled with people. The music video for "Didi Tera Devar Deewana" is cited as the best example to showcase the grandeur of the sets. The sequence which portrays Prem hanging on a chandelier gives the whole top view of a room full of women sporting traditional clothes. To picture various perspectives, tracking shots and a variety of camera angles have been used.

== Reception ==
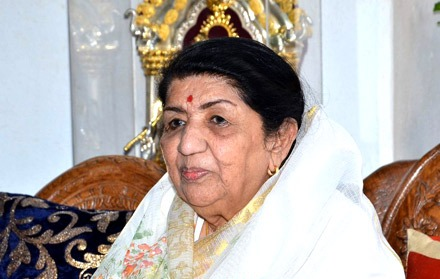
Lata Mangeshkar won a special Filmfare award for "Didi Tera Devar Deewana"

The song gained instant fame upon its release, bringing sales of over ₹11.7 crore (US$1.2 million), and topping the Philips Top 10, BPL Oye! and Superhit Muqabla before the film was released. Furthermore, the music production house, His Master's Voice, sold over 30 lakh tapes.

Lata Mangeshkar, who debuted in the 1940s as a singer, had reduced her playback activity in the 1990s, performing only selected songs. She recorded more than 10 songs for Hum Aapke Hain Koun..! Since the inception of the Best Playback Singer category at the Filmfare Awards in 1959, Mangeshkar dominated the Female Playback Singer category until 1969, when she chose to part the award with fellow singers, for encouraging them. Following this, "Didi Tera Devar Deewana" was praised on public demand with a Special award during the Filmware Awards ceremony. At the 42nd National Film Awards, Jay Borade won the Best Choreography award for all the songs featured in the film. The official citation of the award was: "For a graceful and aesthetically pleasing choreography, contemporary and yet traditional in its adherence to Indian cultural practices."

== Legal issues ==
In 1995, the Gramophone Co. of India, which owned the audio copyrights of the song, filed suit against Super Cassette Industries for bringing audio cassettes in market titled "Hum Aapke Hain Kaun", which were packaged with the same cover sleeve of Gramophone Co. India's publishings. The Delhi High Court ruled in favour of Gramophone Co. India, directing that Super Cassette Industries must not use similar packing for their product. Furthermore, they highlighted that "the record is not from the original soundtrack, being only an alternative version."

== Legacy ==
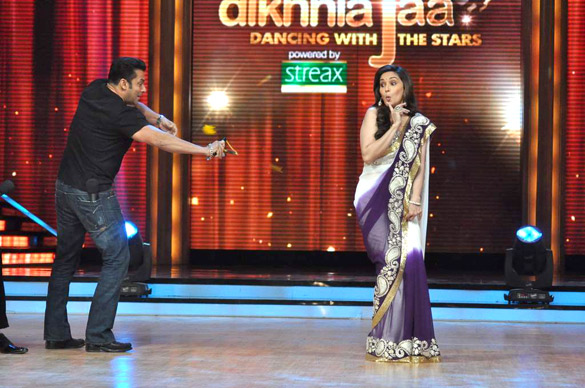
On the sets of celebrity dancing show Jhalak Dikhhla Jaa, Khan and Dixit reenacted the scene where Khan hits Dixit with a marigold flower using a slingshot.

"Madhuri Dixit oozed a devilishly cunning conservative sexiness in her purple sari and backless blouse in Hum Aapke Hain Koun..!"
– Verve on Dixit's look

Dixit draped a bright purple jaded satin saree with a backless khidki-blouse; the saree was reported to have cost ₹1.5 million (US$16,000). A scene in the film which portrays her walking down the stairs with Khan remaining stunned gaping at her was pointed out as an "iconic scene". Designed by Anna Singh, the saree was described as one of the "most talked-about saris" by both The Tribune and The Times of India. It became popular and was made available for purchase in various shops around the world, with it selling in large numbers. Dolls sporting this outfit were also marketed. It also set a trend for purple colour in wedding seasons. With increasing appeal, the subsequent film's poster showed only Dixit in the purple saree whereas initially she was placed besides Khan. In 2012, the romantic comedy film Shirin Farhad Ki Toh Nikal Padi also used the same saree in their film's poster.

Painter Maqbool Fida Hussain found his muse in Madhuri Dixit after watching the part of Hum Aapke Hai Koun...! where "Didi Tera Devar Deewana" is performed. He went on to watch the film 67 times. About Dixit's dance in the song Hussain confessed, "That movement of the hips is out of this world. I have never seen such a dancer, and I have seen the best. Her words are transformed into body language." He painted a series of paintings inspired from Dixit. Madhuri as Menaka with Vishvamitra, Madhuri as Radha with Krishna, Madhuri playing tennis at Wimbledon were some of those paintings. The Menaka painting was inspired from the famous painting of apsara Menaka as painted by Raja Ravi Varma. Another painting also showed Dixit with Meryl Streep leaning over a bridge in Madison County and Clint Eastwood on horseback below. The painting Nautanki showed Dixit with a backless blouse turning behind like the step in "Didi Tera Devar Deewana", however this time sporting a nine yards Maharashtrian saree. Hussain formed a collaborative company, Madhuri-McBull Creations, which went on to produce the film Gaja Gamini in 2000 that had Dixit playing various roles like Shakuntala and Mona Lisa. He was also humorously being referred to as "Madhuri Fida Hussain" (meaning: Madhuri-obsessed Hussain).

The song was included in the 4-CD Collector's Exclusive pack 60 years of Rajshri: A Retrospect released by Saregama in 2006. In 2014, twenty years after the film's release, the song was called "a song for every season" by The Times of India.
