= Sharda Sinha =

Indian singer (1952–2024)

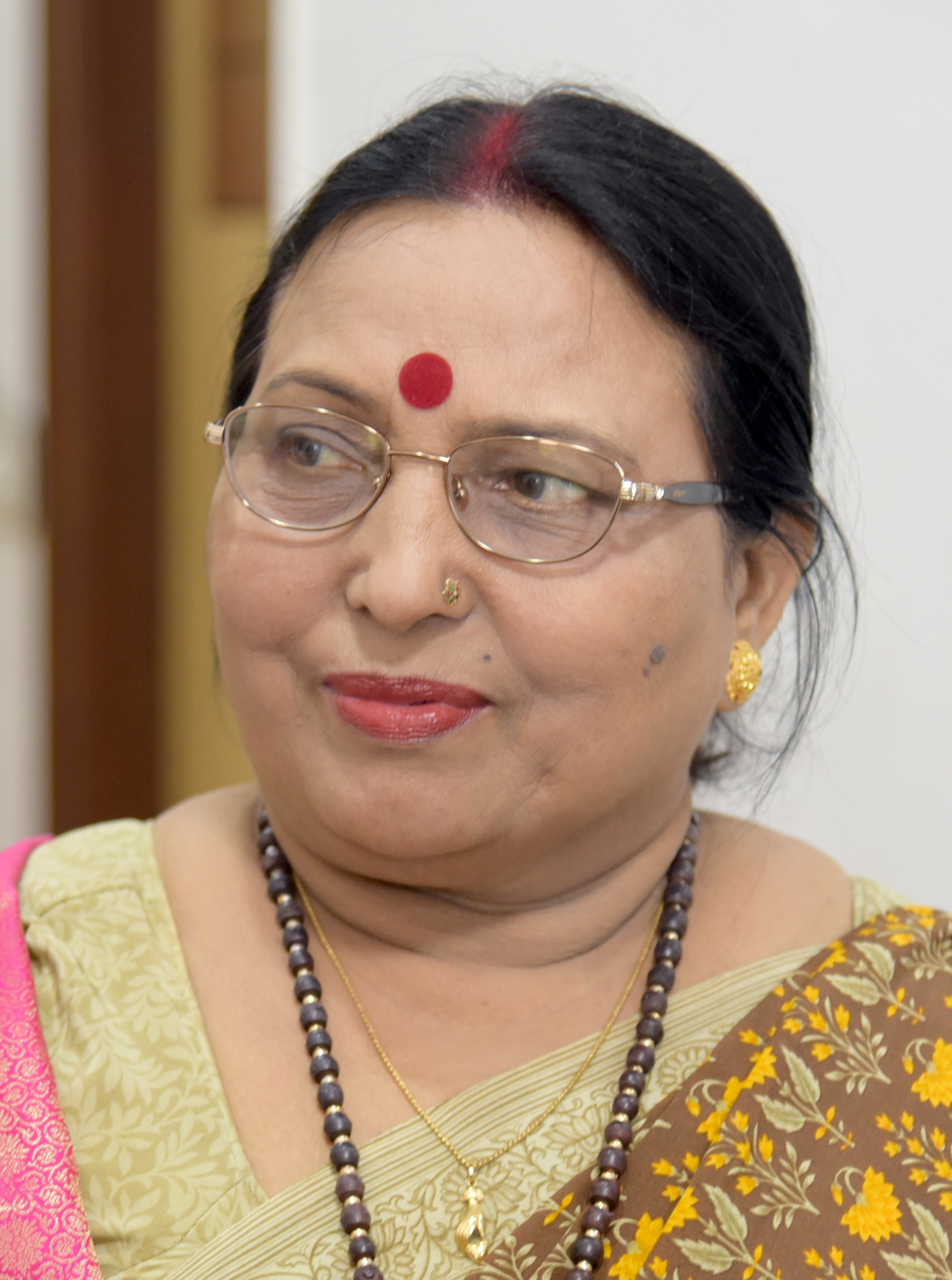
- Sinha in 2018
- Born: 1 October 1952; Hulas, Bihar, India
- Died: 5 November 2024 (aged 72); New Delhi, India
- Other name: Bihar Swar Kokila
- Education: Magadh Mahila College, Prayag Sangeet Samiti, Lalit Narayan Mithila University
- Occupations: Singer, folk singer, classical singer
- Years active: 1980–2024
- Spouse: Brajkishore Sinha (m. 1970; died 2024)
- Children: 2
- Awards: Padma Shri (1991); Sangeet Natak Akademi Award (2000); Padma Bhushan (2018); Padma Vibhushan (2025)

Sharda Sinha (1 October 1952 – 5 November 2024) was an Indian folk and classical singer. Hailing from Bihar, she predominantly sang in Maithili and Bhojpuri language and is called Bihar Kokila, the cuckoo of Bihar. Sinha has sung many folk songs including "Vivah Geet", "Chhath Geet". In 1991, she received the Padma Shri award for her contribution to music. In 2000, she received the Sangeet Natak Akademi Award for her contribution to the field of music. She was awarded Padma Bhushan, India's third highest civilian award, on the eve of Republic Day in 2018. Sinha was posthumously awarded Padma Vibhushan, India's second highest civilian award, on the eve of Republic Day in 2025.

== Early life ==
Sinha was born on 1 October 1952 in the village of Hulas of Raghopur block of Supaul district, Bihar in a Bhumihar family. She was the only daughter among nine children of Sukhdev Thakur. Her in-laws' home is in Sihama village in Begusarai district.

== Career ==
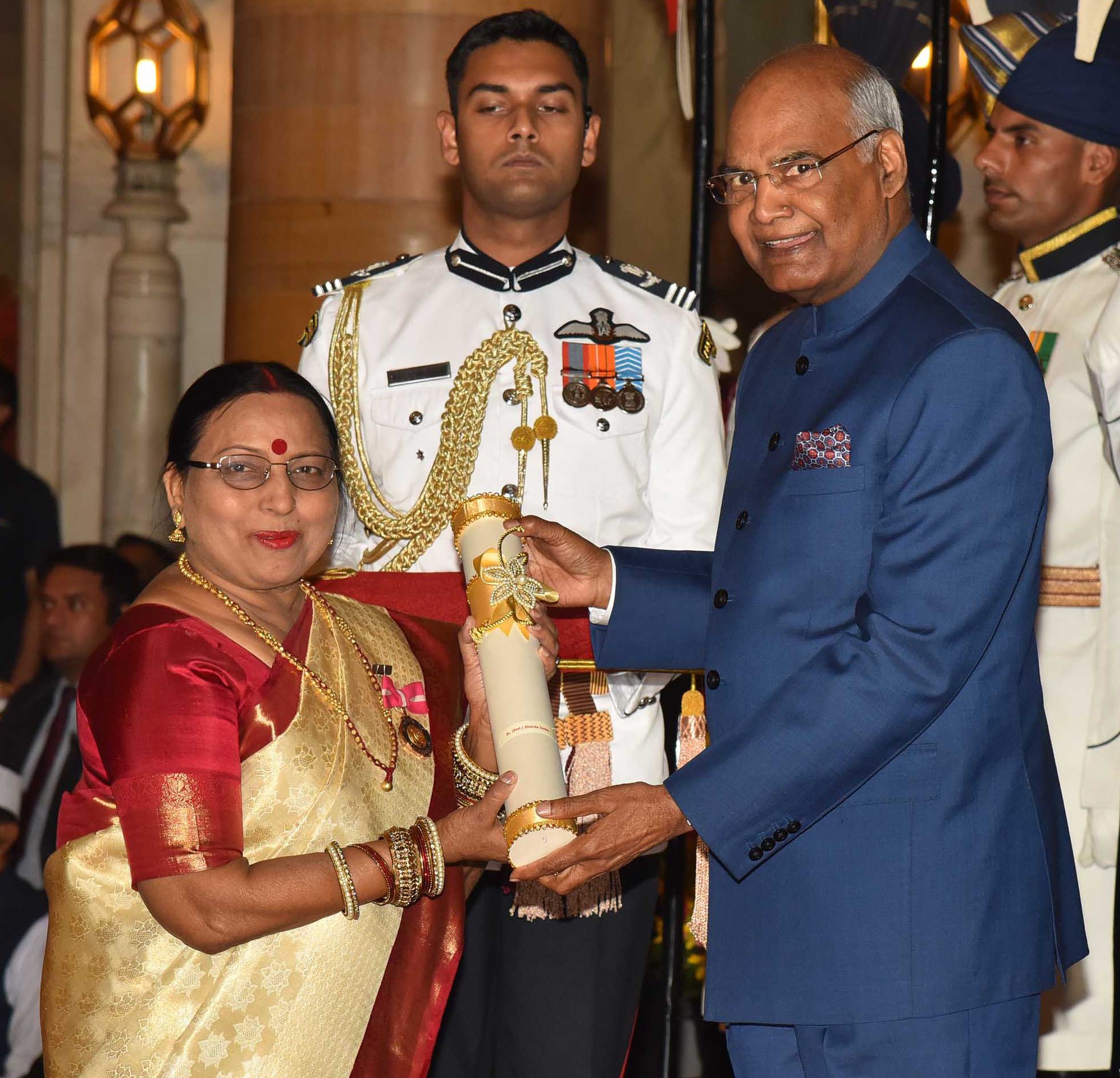
Shri Ram Nath Kovind presenting the Padma Bhushan Award to Dr. (Smt.) Sharda Sinha, at Rashtrapati Bhavan, in New Delhi

Sinha started her career by singing Maithili folk songs. Apart from Maithili, Sinha sang in Bhojpuri, Magahi and Hindi. Prayag Sangeet Samiti organised Basant Mahotsava at Allahabad where Sinha presented numerous songs based on the theme of spring season, where the advent of spring was narrated through folk songs. She regularly performed during Chhath Puja festivities. She performed when the Prime Minister of Mauritius Navin Ramgoolam came to Bihar.

Sinha performed at Pragati Maidan in the Bihar Utsav, 2010, New Delhi.

Sinha had also lent her voice to some Hindi film songs, including "Kahe Toh Se Sajna" from Salman Khan's debut film Maine Pyar Kiya, "Taar Bijli" from Anurag Kashyap's critically acclaimed Gangs of Wasseypur Part 2, "Kaun Si Nagaria" from Chaarfutiya Chhokare and Nitin Neera Chandra's Deswa.

=== Chhath songs ===
Sinha is known for her Chhath-related devotional songs. She came out with two new songs on Chhath after a decade in 2018. Her last album of devotional songs was released in 2006.

In the songs – with lyrics such as Supawo Naa Mile Maai and Pahile Pahil Chhathi Maiya – Sharda urged people to come to Bihar during Chhath. Other Chhath songs played during the festival include Kelwa Ke Paat Par Ugalan Suraj Mal Jhake Jhuke, Hey Chhathi Maiya, Ho Dinanath, Bahangi Lachakat Jaaye, Roje Roje Ugelaa, Suna Chhathi Maai, Jode Jode Supawa and Patna Ke Ghat Par. Though old, the songs are relevant and devotees play them every year.

"High-handedness of music companies and lack of good lyrics had kept me away all this while," Sharda told The Telegraph on 3 November 2016. "As these issues got addressed this year, I rendered my voice to the songs." It took 20 days to shoot the songs, which were released on Diwali.

The lyricist for Supawo Naa Mile Maai (5.57 minutes) is Hriday Narayan Jha and for Pahile Pahil Chhathi Maiya (6.57 minutes) both Shanti Jain and Sharda. Pahile Pahil... – produced by Neetu Chandra, Nitin Neera Chandra and Anshuman Sinha – was released under the banners of Swar Sharda (Sharda Sinha Music Foundation), Champaran Talkies and Neo Bihar. Supawo Na Mile Maai has been released under the banner of Swar Sharda and produced by Anshuman.

Sharda's last album on Chhath, Arag, had eight songs. In her entire career, she has sung 62 Chhath songs in nine albums released by T-Series, His Master's Voice and Tips. "Through these songs, I have tried my level best to save our rich culture and tradition," Sharda said. "There is a urban contemporary feel so that people can relate to it."

== Filmography ==
Bhojpuri

- Dumari Ke ho Phoolba - Piritiya (Album) - 1987
- Kahe Toh Se Sajna - Maine Pyar Kiya (album) - 1989 (Hindi movie)
- Koyal Bin - Kekra Se Kahan Mile Jala - 1999

Hindi

- Babul - Hum Aapke Hain Koun..!(album) - 1994
- Taar Bijli - Gangs of Wasseypur 2 - 2012
- Kaun Si Nagariya - Chaarfutiya Chhokare - 2014

== Personal life and death ==
She married Brajkishore Sinha in 1970, with whom she had a son, Anshuman and daughter, Vandana. Husband Brajkishore died from a brain haemorrhage in September 2024.

Sinha suffered from multiple myeloma from 2017. On 5 November 2024, she was put on ventilator support at AIIMS Delhi. She died later that night, at the age of 72. Her last rites were performed on 7 November 2024 in Patna with full state honours.

== Awards and recognition ==
Sinha received numerous awards throughout her career, notably the Padma Shri in 1991, the Sangeet Natak Akademi Award in 2000, the Padma Bhushan in 2018 and the Padma Vibhushan (posthumously) in 2025.
