= Jigna Desai =

Indian-American scholar

Jigna Desai (born 1968 in Ahmedabad, India) is a Professor in the Department of Gender, Women and Sexuality Studies and Asian American Studies, as of 2026 at the University of California Santa Barbara.

She was previously at the University of Minnesota.

She is a writer, teacher, mentor, artist, and engaged researcher whose scholarship crosses many fields of study including transnational feminism, Asian American Studies, queer studies, postcolonial feminism, critical disability studies, critical youth studies, feminist media studies, critical ethnic studies, and critical university studies. She has also written extensively on issues of racial and gender disparities and social justice.

== Feminist media, Bollywood, and South Asian diasporas ==
For the last two decades, she has researched how media impacts identities and communities in the United States and globally. Her early work was formative to the study of South Asian diasporas and diasporic culture in Britain, Canada, and the United States, especially from a feminist and queer perspectives. She is also known for her scholarship on English-language Indian films, Indian cinema, Bollywood, and transnational cinema; her book Beyond Bollywood was the first scholarly work to take a "comprehensive look at the emergence, development, and significance of contemporary South Asian diasporic cinema." She has written about filmmakers such as Deepa Mehta, Mira Nair, and Kaizad Gustad. She also co-edited the collection Bollywood: A Reader with Rajinder Dudrah.

== Asian American studies, migration, and emergent communities ==
In Asian American Studies, Desai is known for her contributions to rethinking the importance of understudied Asian American communities in the South and Midwest. She co-edited the interdisciplinary collection Asian Americans in Dixie: Race and Migration in the South with Khyati Joshi. She also serves as co-editor of the Asian American Experience book series for the University of Illinois Press.

== Critical university studies, K–12 engaged research, digital learning ==
She has long been an advocate for underrepresented students of color within higher education. For two decades, her teaching and service have worked to strengthen institutional support for both undergraduate and graduate students of color. For the last decade, she has focused on the role of digital learning in the university classroom; she is especially interested in how digital tools can be integrated to empower students and further social justice. For the past year, she has been working to empower urban middle school students through digital storytelling through the Minnesota Youth Story Squad.

== Education, career, and awards ==
Desai has a B.S. in Earth, Atmospheric, and Planetary Sciences and a second B.S. in Literature with Cognitive Science from the Massachusetts Institute of Technology, and a Ph.D. in English (with a minor in feminist studies) from the University of Minnesota. At MIT, she worked as an undergraduate research assistant for Dr. Steven Pinker. Subsequently, she conducted astronomical research at University of California, Berkeley and Lawrence Berkeley National Laboratory with Dr. Saul Perlmutter, and Dr. Carlton R. Pennypacker, and Dr. Gerson Goldhaber on the Supernova Cosmology Project.

She has also been honored to receive several awards for her teaching, mentorship, and service including the Association for Asian American Studies Excellence in Mentorship Award, University of Minnesota's Arthur “Red” Motley Undergraduate Teaching Award, University of Minnesota’s Graduate and Professional Teaching Award, and University of Minnesota's President’s Award for Outstanding Service. She has been recognized with residential fellowships at the Centre for Humanities Research at the University of Western Cape, Institute for Advanced Studies at the University of Minnesota, and at Harvard University. Desai has been designated a Generation Next Faculty Fellow, Fink Faculty Innovation Professor, and shares the Imagine Chair in Arts, Humanities, and Design with Tammy Berberi and Jennifer Row at the University of Minnesota.

== Works ==
- Desai, Jigna and Khyati Y. Joshi, editors. Asian Americans in Dixie: race and migration in the South. University of Illinois Press, 2013. ISBN 9780252037832
- Desai, Jigna. Beyond Bollywood: The Cultural Politics of South Asian Diasporic Film. Routledge, 2003. ISBN 041596685X
- Dudrah, Rajinder and Jigna Desai. The Bollywood Reader. Open University Press, 2008. ISBN 0335222129
- Desai, Jigna. "Homo on the Range: Mobile and Global Sexualities". Social Text 73 (volume 20, number 4), Winter 2002, pages 65–89.
- Desai, Jigna. Rooted Homelands, Routed Hostlands : (En)Gendered Mobility in the South Asian Diaspora. Thesis (Ph.D), University of Minnesota, 1999.
