= Tejaswini Ganti =

Indian author and scholar

- Education: University of Pennsylvania; Northwestern University; New York University
- Occupations: Author, scholar
- Years active: 1996–present

Tejaswini Ganti is an Indian anthropological and film scholar and associate professor at the New York University, specializing in South Asian culture. She is an alumna from the University of Pennsylvania, the Northwestern University, and the New York University.

== Biography ==
Ganti has worked as an associate professor for the New York University since 2012 and is an alumna of it along with the University of Pennsylvania and Northwestern University. In 1995, she produced a bhangra-related documentary, titled Gimme Somethin' to Dance to!. The next year, she lived in Mumbai for a year and later moved to the United States.

Ganti has written two books: Bollywood: A Guidebook to Popular Hindi Cinema (2004), and Producing Bollywood: Inside the Contemporary Hindi Film Industry (2012). The latter is about Bollywood industry from 1994 to 2010 and was published on 7 March 2012 by the Duke University Press, receiving positive critical reviews. Ritesh Mehta from the International Journal of Communication praised her for "[crafting] an ode to an India in deep transition, via the multifaceted lenses of a glamorized and iconic subsection of its Hindi-language filmmakers and actors... [A] landmark study." The anthropologist and professor Arjun Appadurai of the New York University called it "the first book on Bollywood to combine a deep knowledge of the dynamics of script, song, stars, and style in this cinematic world with an equally keen sense of the unique nature of the politics, finance, and cultural prejudices of the film industry".

== Bibliography ==
- Ganti, Tejaswini (26 August 2004). Bollywood: A Guidebook to Popular Hindi Cinema. Taylor & Francis. ISBN 978-04-15288-54-5.
- Ganti, Tejaswini (7 March 2012). Producing Bollywood: Inside the Contemporary Hindi Film Industry. Duke University Press. ISBN 978-08-22352-13-6.
