= Bihar Utsav =

Cultural festival organised by Government of Bihar

Bihar Utsav is a cultural festival organised by Government of Bihar to showcase art, culture and heritage of Bihar at Dilli Haat in Delhi, India.

Handloom and handicraft products made by Bihar artisans are exhibited and sold during the festival. Several cultural events are organised at various venues to showcase the rich culture and heritage of Bihar.
