= Anna Singh =

Indian fashion designer

Ana Singh
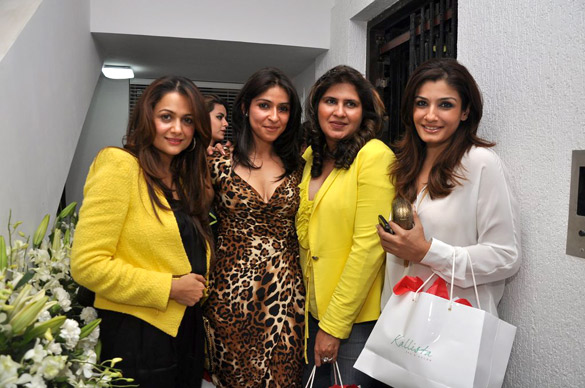
- From left to right: Amrita Arora, an unidentified background person, Bhavana Pandey, Anna Singh, and Raveena Tandon
- Born: Mumbai, India

Ana Singh is an Indian fashion designer, mainly working for the Indian movie industry Bollywood.

== Early life ==
She has designed costumes for more than 900 films and has been working since 1989. In 2002 she was the first fashion designer to introduce actress Katrina Kaif in her show as a model. In 2010, she designed the clothes for the actors who participated in the opening ceremony of the Commonwealth Games in India.

== Awards ==
Singh is a two-time winner of the National Film Award for Best Costume Design.

== Costume designer ==
- Khal Nayak (1993)
- 1942: A Love Story (1994)
- Taj Mahal: An Eternal Love Story (2005)
- Vivah (2006)
- Once Upon A Time In Mumbaai (2010)
- Veer (2010)
