= 40th Filmfare Awards =

1995 awards for Hindi cinema

- Date: 25 February 1995

Highlights
- Best Film: Hum Aapke Hain Koun..!
- Critics Award for Best Film: Bandit Queen
- Most awards: 1942: A Love Story (9)
- Most nominations: 1942: A Love Story & Hum Aapke Hain Koun..! (14)

The 40th Filmfare Awards for Hindi-language films from India were held on 25 February 1995.

1942: A Love Story and Hum Aapke Hain Koun..!, which is one of the most successful films of Bollywood, led the ceremony with 13 nominations each, followed by Mohra with 9 nominations and Krantiveer with 7 nominations.

1942: A Love Story won 9 awards, including Best Supporting Actor (for Jackie Shroff) and Best Music Director (a posthumous win for R. D. Burman), thus becoming the most-awarded film at the ceremony.

Hum Aapke Hain Koun..! was the runner-up of the ceremony with 5 awards, including Best Film, Best Director (Barjatya), Best Actress (Dixit) and Special Award (Lata Mangeshkar for "Didi Tera Devar Deewana").

Madhuri Dixit received dual nominations for Best Actress for her performances in Anjaam and Hum Aapke Hain Koun..!, winning for the latter.

== Main awards ==
The winners and nominees have been listed below. Winners are listed first, highlighted in boldface, and indicated with a double dagger (‡).

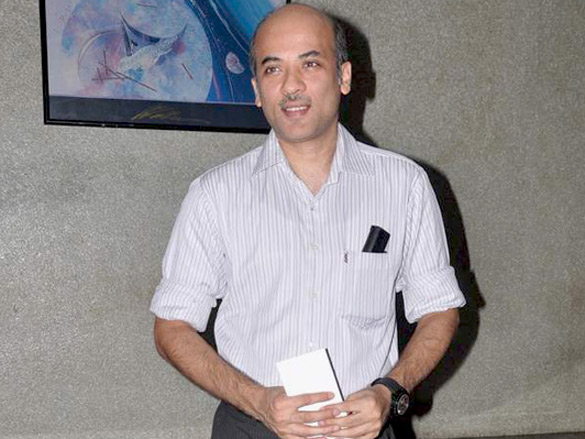
Sooraj Barjatya — Best Director winner for Hum Aapke Hain Koun..!

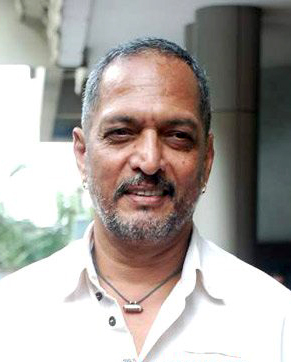
Nana Patekar — Best Actor winner for Krantiveer

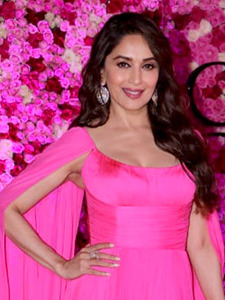
Madhuri Dixit — Best Actress winner for Hum Aapke Hain Koun..!

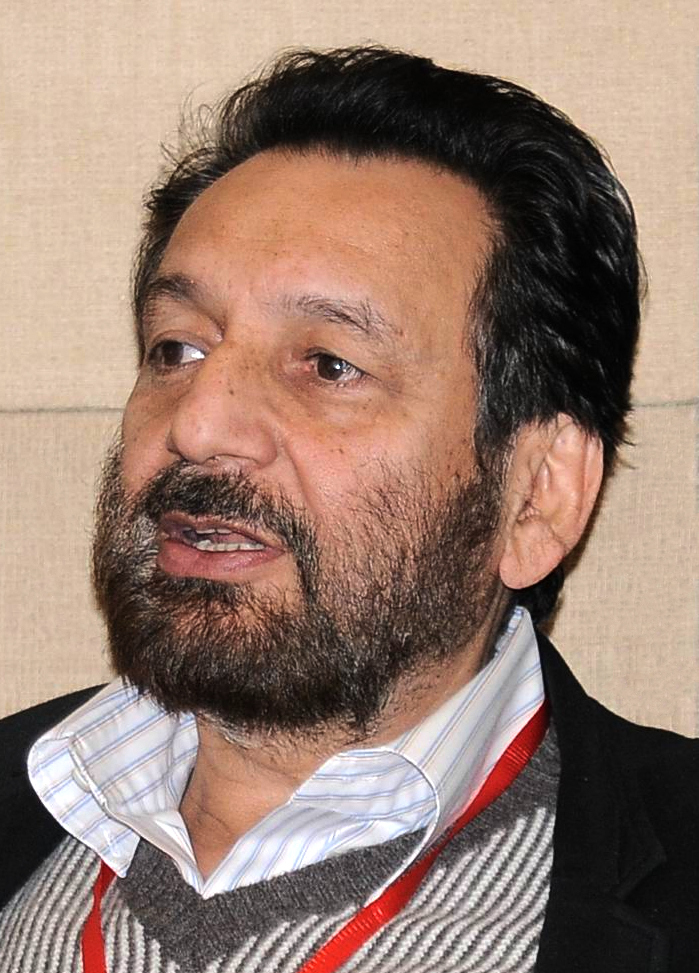
Shekhar Kapoor — Best Director Critics winner for Bandit Queen

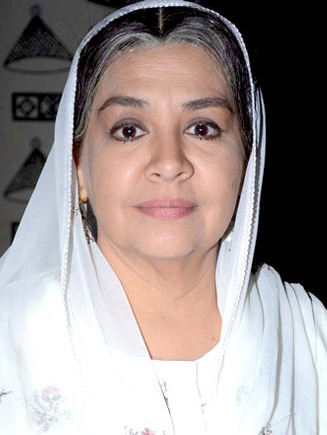
Farida Jalal — Best Actress Critics winner for Mammo

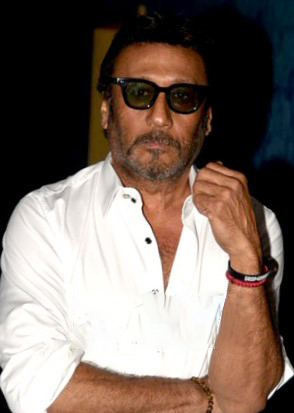
Jackie Shroff — Best Supporting Actor winner for 1942: A Love Story

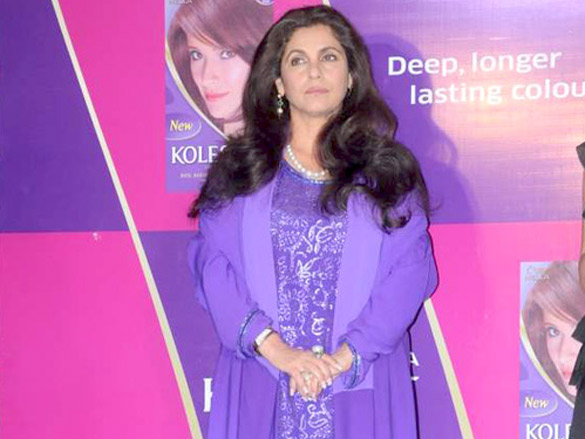
Dimple Kapadia — Best Supporting Actress winner for Krantiveer

=== Popular Awards ===
Best Film	Best Director
**Hum Aapke Hain Koun..!**; 1942: A Love Story; Andaz Apna Apna; Krantiveer; Mohra	**Sooraj Barjatya – Hum Aapke Hain Koun..!**; Mehul Kumar – Krantiveer; Rajiv Rai – Mohra; Rajkumar Santoshi – Andaz Apna Apna; Vidhu Vinod Chopra – 1942: A Love Story
Best Actor	Best Actress
**Nana Patekar – Krantiveer**; Aamir Khan – Andaz Apna Apna; Akshay Kumar – Yeh Dillagi; Anil Kapoor – 1942: A Love Story; Salman Khan - Hum Aapke Hain Koun..!	**Madhuri Dixit – Hum Aapke Hain Koun..!**; Kajol – Yeh Dillagi; Madhuri Dixit – Anjaam; Manisha Koirala – 1942: A Love Story; Sridevi – Laadla
Best Supporting Actor	Best Supporting Actress
**Jackie Shroff – 1942: A Love Story**; Anupam Kher – Hum Aapke Hain Koun..!; Mohnish Bahl – Hum Aapke Hain Koun..!; Saif Ali Khan – Main Khiladi Tu Anari; Sunil Shetty – Dilwale	**Dimple Kapadia – Krantiveer**; Aruna Irani – Suhaag; Raveena Tandon – Laadla; Reema Lagoo – Hum Aapke Hain Koun..!; Renuka Shahane – Hum Aapke Hain Koun..!
Best Performance in a Comic Role	Best Performance in a Negative Role
**Shakti Kapoor – Raja Babu**; Kader Khan – Main Khiladi Tu Anari; Laxmikant Berde – Hum Aapke Hain Koun..!; Paresh Rawal – Mohra; Shakti Kapoor – Andaz Apna Apna	**Shah Rukh Khan – Anjaam**; Danny Denzongpa – Krantiveer; Danny Denzongpa – Vijaypath; Naseeruddin Shah – Mohra
Best Music Director	Best Lyricist
**1942: A Love Story – R.D. Burman**; Hum Aapke Hain Koun..! – Raamlaxman; Main Khiladi Tu Anari – Anu Malik; Mohra – Viju Shah; Yeh Dillagi – Dilip Sen-Sameer Sen	**1942: A Love Story – Javed Akhtar for Ek Ladki Ko Dekha**; Hum Aapke Hain Koun..! – Dev Kohli for Hum Aapke Hain Koun..!; Mohra – Anand Bakshi for Tu Cheez Badi Hai; Yeh Dillagi – Sameer for Ole Ole
Best Male Playback Singer	Best Female Playback Singer
**1942: A Love Story – Kumar Sanu for Ek Ladki Ko Dekha**; Hum Aapke Hain Koun..! – S. P. Balasubramaniam for Hum Aapke Hain Koun..!; Mohra – Udit Narayan for Tu Cheez Badi Hai; Yeh Dillagi – Abhijeet for Ole Ole	**1942: A Love Story – Kavita Krishnamurthy for Pyaar Hua Chupke Se**; Main Khiladi Tu Anari – Alka Yagnik for Chura Ke Dil; Mohra – Kavita Krishnamurthy for Tu Cheez Badi Hai; Vijaypath – Alisha Chinai for Ruk Ruk Ruk; Vijaypath – Alka Yagnik for Raah Main

=== Technical Awards ===
Best Story	Best Screenplay
**Krantiveer – K. K. Singh**	**Hum Aapke Hain Koun..! – Sooraj Barjatya**
Best Dialogue	Best Action
**Krantiveer – K. K. Singh**	**Anth**
Best Sound	Best Choreography
**1942: A Love Story**	**Mohra – Tu Cheez Badi Hai**
Best Editing	Best Art Direction
**1942: A Love Story**	**1942: A Love Story**
Best Cinematography
**1942: A Love Story**

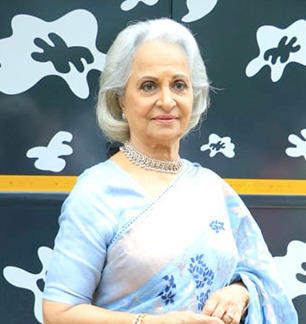
Waheeda Rehman — Lifetime Achievement Awardee

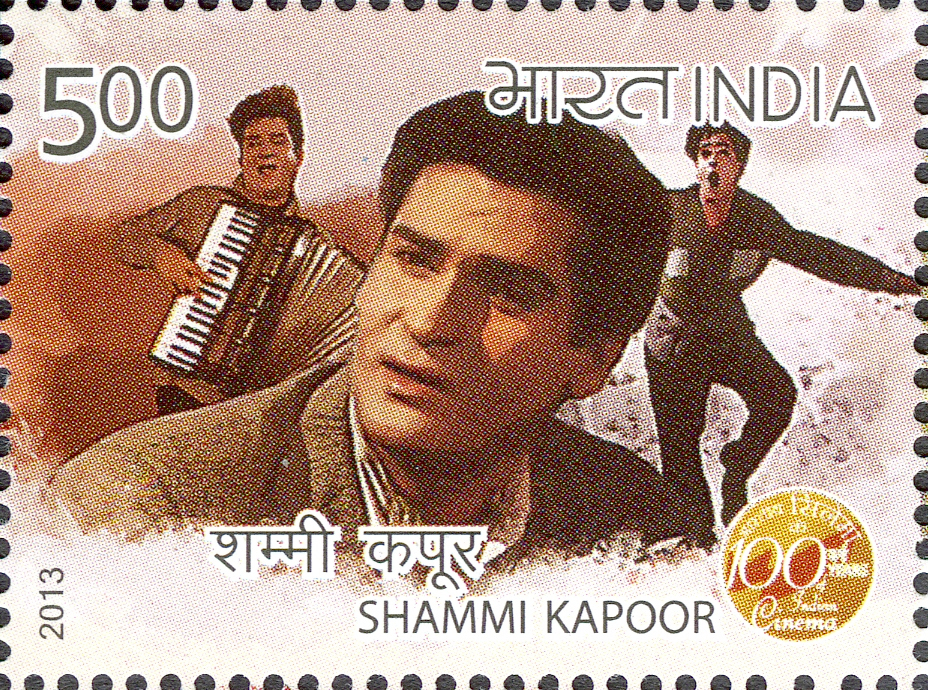
Shammi Kapoor — Lifetime Achievement Awardee

=== Special awards ===
Lifetime Achievement Award
**Shammi Kapoor and Waheeda Rehman**
Special Award
**Lata Mangeshkar** for singing the song "Didi Tera Devar Deewana" for the film Hum Aapke Hain Koun..! as long back, she stopped accepting nominations for Best Female Playback Singer to promote new talent. However, Filmfare gave her the Special Award to honor her rendition.
Best Debut
**Tabu – Vijaypath**
Lux New Face of the Year
**Sonali Bendre – Aag**
R. D. Burman Award
**A. R. Rahman**

=== Critics' awards ===
Best Film (Best Director)
- **Bandit Queen (Shekhar Kapoor)**
Best Actress
- **Farida Jalal – Mammo**
Best Documentary
- **Manzar**

== Biggest Winners ==
- 1942: A Love Story – 9/13
- Hum Aapke Hain Koun..! – 5/14
- Krantiveer – 4/7
- Mohra – 1/9
- Vijaypath – 1/4

== See also ==
- 41st Filmfare Awards
- 42nd Filmfare Awards
- Filmfare Awards
