= Filmfare Special Award =

Annual award for Hindi films

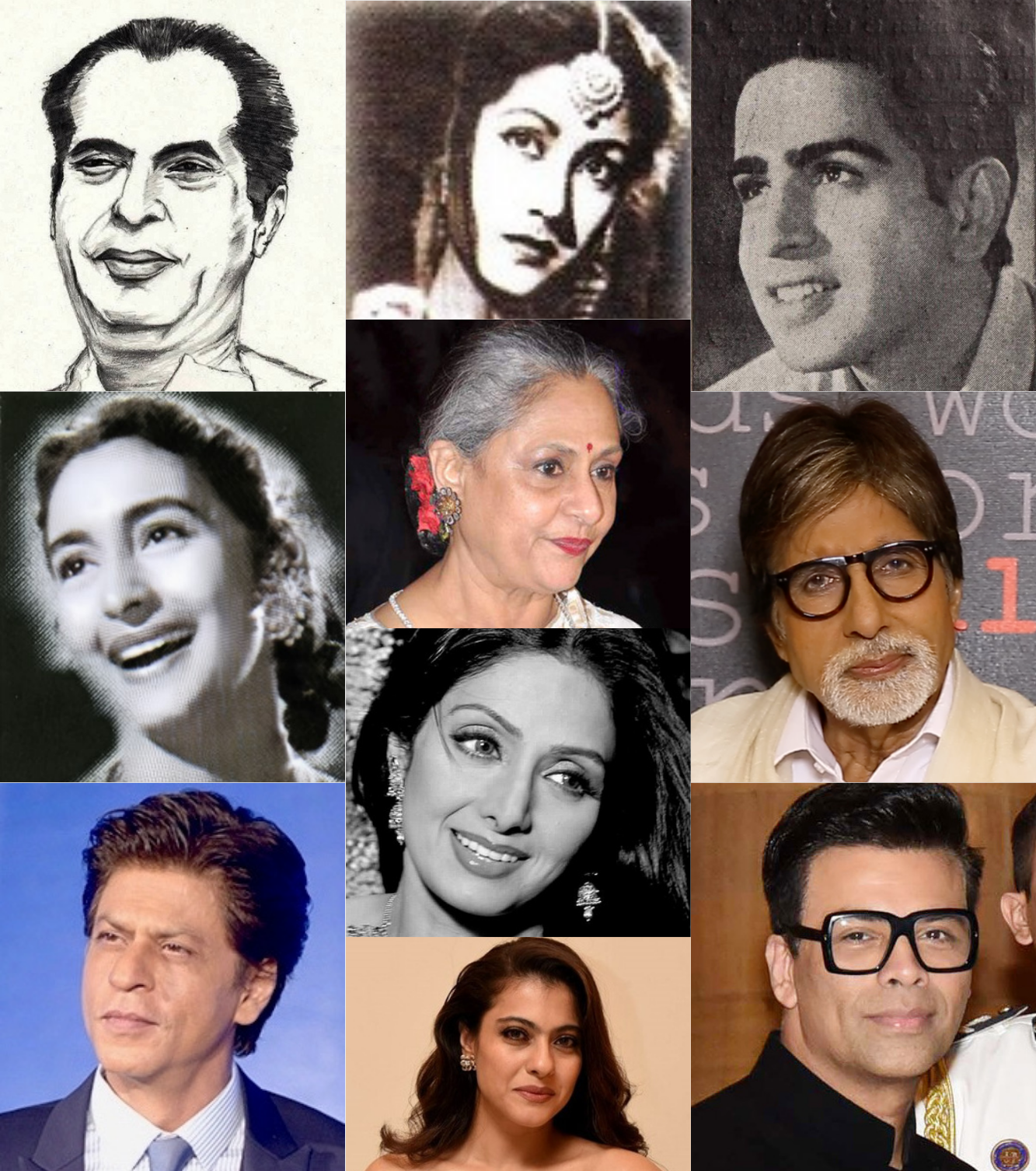
- The 2025 recipients: Bimal Roy, Meena Kumari, Dilip Kumar, Nutan, Jaya Bachchan, Amitabh Bachchan, Sridevi, Shah Rukh Khan, Kajol, Karan Johar (as Cine Icons)
- Awarded for: Contribution to Cinema OR in a particular film.
- Country: India
- Presented by: Filmfare
- First award: Balraj Sahni (1971)
- Currently held by: Bimal Roy, Meena Kumari, Dilip Kumar, Nutan, Amitabh Bachchan, Jaya Bachchan, Sridevi, Shah Rukh Khan, Kajol, Karan Johar and Sholay (for completing 50 years), (2025)
- Website: Filmfare winners

The Filmfare Special Award or Special Performance Award or Special Mention or Special Jury Award is given by the Filmfare magazine as part of its annual Filmfare Awards for Hindi films.

It acknowledges a special performance and encourages artists, filmmakers and musicians to break new ground in drama, direction, music and acting. It is only given if someone has done something really different. However, it is also given occasionally to film personalities for their contribution to the film industry.

== Winners ==
=== 1970s ===
Year	Image	Recipient	Role	Notes
1971 (18th)		Balraj Sahni	actor	for outstanding contribution to Indian films
1972 (19th)		Jaya Bachchan	actress	for the film Uphaar
1972 (19th)		Prithviraj Kapoor	actor	Special Commendation
1973 (20th)		V. Shantaram	filmmaker	Special Commendation award
1973 (20th)	–	Anubhav	film	Special Citation for Basu Bhattacharya
1974 (21st)		Rajesh Khanna	actor	for the film Anuraag
1975 (22nd)	–	Ankur	film	• Mohan J. Bijlani • Freni Variava
1976 (23rd)		Farida Jalal	actress	for her acting in the movie Majboor
1976 (23rd)		Preeti Sagar	singer	for her rendition of the song "My Heart is Beating"
1976 (23rd)		Uttam Kumar	actor	For his acting in the film Amanush
1977 (24th)		K. J. Yesudas	singer	for the film Chitchor
1978 (25th)		Bhimasain Khurana	director	for the film Gharaonda
1978 (25th)		Amol Palekar	actor	for his acting in Bhumika
1978 (25th)		Naseeruddin Shah	actor	for his acting in Manthan
1979 (26th)		Master Raju	child actor	for his performance in the film Kitaab

=== 1980s ===
Year	Image	Recipient	Role	Notes
1980 (27th)		Muzaffar Ali	director	for the film Gaman
1981 (28th)		Mushir Riaz Alam	producer	for Apne Paraye
1982 (29th)		Padmini Kolhapure	actress	for her performance in Ahista Ahista
1982 (29th)		Shashi Kapoor	producer	for 36 Chowringhee Lane

=== 1990s ===
Year	Image	Recipient	Role	Notes
1990 (35th)		Rajesh Khanna	actor	for completing 25 years in the Indian film industry.
1993 (38th)		Lata Mangeshkar	singer	Mangeshkar could not be nominated for the Best Female Playback Singer award as many years back she requested that her name be not considered for a nomination in order to promote new talent, the jury awarded her for her rendition of the song "Didi Tera Devar Deewana" from Hum Aapke Hain Koun..!
1996 (41st)		Asha Bhosle	singer	Like her elder sister Lata, Bhosle could not be nominated for the Best Female Playback Singer award as she requested that her name not be considered for a nomination in order to promote new talent. The jury awarded her for her rendition of the song "Tanha Tanha" from the movie Rangeela.
1997 (42nd)		Shobhna Samarth	actress	for their contribution to the Hindi film industry.
1997 (42nd)		Nasir Hussain	filmmaker	for their contribution to the Hindi film industry.
1997 (42nd)		Pran	actor	for their contribution to the Hindi film industry.
1997 (42nd)		Govinda	actor	for his role Shyamsundar in the film Saajan Chale Sasural.
1998 (43rd)		Jaya Bachchan	actress	for her role Sujata Chatterjee in the film Hazaar Chaurasi Ki Maa and her contribution to the film industry.
1999 (44th)		Shekhar Kapur	filmmaker	for his contribution to the film industry and for his achievement in international cinema.

=== 2000s ===
Year	Image	Recipient	Role	Notes
2000 (45th)		Amitabh Bachchan	actor	crowned as "Superstar of the Millennium"
2001 (46th)		Anu Malik	music director	special award for his compositions for the film Refugee
2002 (47th)		Ameesha Patel	actress	for her role Sakina in the film Gadar: Ek Prem Katha
2002 (47th)		Raveena Tandon	actress	for her role Neeta in the film Aks
2004 (49th)		Kareena Kapoor	actress	for her role Chameli in the film Chameli
2005 (50th)		Lata Mangeshkar	singer	Golden trophy presented on the occasion of Filmfare Awards completing 50 years.
2005 (50th)		Dilip Kumar	actor	Golden trophy presented on the occasion of Filmfare Awards completing 50 years.
2005 (50th)		Naushad	music director	Golden trophy presented on the occasion of Filmfare Awards completing 50 years.
2005 (50th)		Sholay (presented to Ramesh Sippy)	film	Golden trophy presented on the occasion of Filmfare Awards completing 50 years.
2007 (52nd)		Deepak Dobriyal	actor	for his role Rajoh Tiwari (certificate) in the film Omkara
2009 (54th)		Prateik Babbar	actor	for his role Amit Mahant (certificate) for the film Jaane Tu... Ya Jaane Na
2009 (54th)		Purab Kohli	actor	for his role Kedar (certificate) for the film Rock On!!

=== 2010s ===
Year	Image	Recipient	Role	Notes
2010 (55th)		Nandita Das	director	for her work for the film Firaaq
2011 (56th)		Amitabh Bachchan	actor	for completing 40 years in the Indian film industry.
2011 (56th)		Madhuri Dixit	actress	for completing 25 years in the Indian film industry.
2012 (57th)		Partho Gupte	actor	for his role Stanley Fernandes (certificate) in the film Stanley Ka Dabba
2013 (58th)		Sridevi	actress	for her roles in Nagina (1986) and Mr. India (1987)
2019 (64th)		Hema Malini	actress	50 Years of Outstanding Contribution to Cinema

=== 2020s ===
Year	Image	Recipient	Role	Notes
2020 (65th)		Manish Malhotra	costume designer	30 Years of Outstanding Contribution to Bollywood Fashion
2020 (65th)		Govinda	actor	for completing 35 years in the Indian film industry.
2025 (70th)		Bimal Roy	filmmaker	Cine Icon Award for their enduring legacy in Hindi Cinema
2025 (70th)		Meena Kumari	actress	Cine Icon Award for their enduring legacy in Hindi Cinema
2025 (70th)		Dilip Kumar	actor	Cine Icon Award for their enduring legacy in Hindi Cinema
2025 (70th)		Nutan	actress	Cine Icon Award for their enduring legacy in Hindi Cinema
2025 (70th)		Amitabh Bachchan	actor	Cine Icon Award for their enduring legacy in Hindi Cinema
2025 (70th)		Jaya Bachchan	actress	Cine Icon Award for their enduring legacy in Hindi Cinema
2025 (70th)		Sridevi	actress	Cine Icon Award for their enduring legacy in Hindi Cinema
2025 (70th)		Shah Rukh Khan	actor	Cine Icon Award for their enduring legacy in Hindi Cinema
2025 (70th)		Kajol	actress	Cine Icon Award for their enduring legacy in Hindi Cinema
2025 (70th)		Karan Johar	filmmaker	Cine Icon Award for their enduring legacy in Hindi Cinema
2025 (70th)		Sholay (presented to Ramesh Sippy)	film	Celebrating 50 years of the film's release.

== See also ==
- Filmfare Awards
- Bollywood
- Cinema of India
