= Tere Mere Beech Mein =

Song
- Language: Hindi
- Released: 5 June 1981
- Composer: Laxmikant–Pyarelal
- Lyricist: Anand Bakshi

"Tere Mere Beech Mein" (transl. Between You and Me) is a song from the 1981 Hindi film Ek Duuje Ke Liye, starring Kamal Haasan and Rati Agnihotri. The song was composed by Laxmikant–Pyarelal. Anand Bakshi was the lyricist of this song and he won a Filmfare Award for Best Lyricist award for penning it. The song was sung by Lata Mangeshkar and S. P. Balasubrahmanyam. Britney Spears' 2004 single "Toxic" samples some of the song.

== Awards and reception ==
Anand Bakshi was the lyricist of this song, and he won a Filmfare Award for Best Lyricist in 1982. S P Balasubramanyam won the National Film Award for Best Male Playback Singer at the 29th National Film Awards "For great feeling and sense of rhythm which he brings to his vocal rendering".

== Other versions ==
The song was reused in the Kannada remake Love Story (2005) as "Nanna Ninna Prema Geethe".
