= Dev Kohli =

Indian poet (1942–2023)

- Born: 2 November 1942; Rawalpindi, Punjab, British India (present-day Punjab, Pakistan)
- Died: 26 August 2023 (aged 80); Mumbai, Maharashtra, India
- Occupations: Poet, lyricist
- Years active: 1971–2023

Dev Kohli (2 November 1942 – 26 August 2023) was an Indian Hindustani poet and lyricist. He penned hundreds of songs in Bollywood films and wrote many hit songs such as Maaye Ni Maaye, Yeh Kaali Kaali Aankhen, Geet Gaata Hoon,O Saki Saki etc.

== Early life ==
Dev Kohli was born in a Sikh family in Rawalpindi, British India (present day Pakistan). After the partition of India, his family moved to Dehradun, India, where he studied at Shri Guru Nanak Dev Guru Maharaj College. His father died in 1958.

== Career ==
Kohli moved to Mumbai in 1964 and began looking for work in films, beginning his career in 1969 with the film Gunda. His breakthrough came with "Geet Gaata Hoon Main" in the film Lal Patthar (1971). The song became a huge success but did not advance his career. He wrote lyrics for several films in the 1970s and 1980s, but remained unnoticed. He again drew attention with Maine Pyaar Kiya (1989) when songs like Aate Jaate Hanste Gaate, Kabootar Ja Ja Ja, Aaja Shaam Hone Aayee, Maine Pyar Kiya, and Kahe Toh Se Sajna became hits. In the 1990s, He collaborated with Anu Malik, for whom he wrote songs such as "Yeh Kaali Kaali Aankhen" in Baazigar (1993) and "Dekho Dekho Jaanam Hum" in Ishq (1997). In November 1998, a former vice-president of the political party Bharatiya Janata Yava Morcha Rakesh Sethi filed a case against Kohli and singer Poornima for using vulgar language in the song "Ab Tak Hai Puri Azaadi" from the film Kudrat (1998). A local court issued a non-bailable warrant against both on 1 April 2003.

== Death ==
Dev Kohli died on 26 August 2023, at the age of 80.

== Awards and nominations ==
Year	Category	Song/nomination	Result
Filmfare Awards
1990	Best Lyrics	"Aate Jaate Hanste Gaate" – Maine Pyaar Kiya	Nominated
1994	Best Lyrics	"Yeh Kaali Kaali Aankhen" – Baazigar	Nominated
1995	Best Lyrics	"Hum Aapke Hain Koun"– Hum Aapke Hain Koun..!	Nominated
IIFA Awards
2005	Best Lyrics	"Saaki Saaki" – Musafir	Nominated
Zee Cine Awards
2018	Song of the Year	"Chalti Hai Kya Nau Se Baara" – Judwaa 2	Nominated
