= Maine Pyar Kiya =

1989 Indian film by Sooraj Barjatya

- Promotional poster
- Directed by: Sooraj Barjatya
- Written by: Sooraj Barjatya
- Story by: S. M. Ahale
- Produced by: Tarachand Barjatya
- Starring: Salman Khan; Bhagyashree
- Cinematography: Aravind Laad
- Edited by: Mukhtar Ahmed
- Music by: Raamlaxman
- Production company: Rajshri Productions
- Distributed by: Rajshri Productions
- Release date: 29 December 1989
- Running time: 192 minutes (Note: It could also be 125 or 173 minutes, depending on the version.)
- Country: India
- Language: Hindi
- Budget: ₹1 crore
- Box office: ₹45 crore

Maine Pyar Kiya (transl. 'I've loved'), also known by the initialism MPK, is a 1989 Indian Hindi-language romantic action drama film directed by Sooraj Barjatya in his directorial debut. Produced by Tarachand Barjatya, the film was co-written by S. M. Ahale, and Sooraj Barjatya, and distributed by Rajshri Productions. The film stars Salman Khan in his first lead role alongside Bhagyashree in her Big screen debut. It also features Alok Nath, Mohnish Bahl, Reema Lagoo, Rajeev Verma, Ajit Vachani, and Laxmikant Berde in supporting roles. Maine Pyar Kiya tells the story of two individuals whose journey from friendship to love is complicated by family differences, ultimately challenging them to fight for their relationship.

Principal photography took place in Mumbai and various locations in Ooty. The film features a score and soundtrack composed by Raamlaxman, while Asad Bhopali wrote the lyrics. Maine Pyar Kiya is considered to be one of Khan's most iconic and loved films, and it became a cult favorite because of its songs, dialogues, and chemistry between Khan and Bhagyashree. The film also established the careers of the supporting cast including Mohnish Bahl and Laxmikant Berde.

The film was released on 29 December 1989. Made on a budget of ₹20 million, the film emerged as a commercial blockbuster, grossing ₹458.1 million worldwide. It became the highest-grossing Bollywood film of the year and the highest-grossing Indian film of the 1980s. The film garnered positive reviews from critics upon its release, with the direction, the story, and the performances earning the most praise. Out of twelve nominations, Maine Pyar Kiya won six Filmfare Awards: Best Film, Best Director, Best Lyricist, Best Male Playback Singer, Best Male Debut, and Best Female Debut. The film was also dubbed in Spanish and released as Te Amo. It was also dubbed in Telugu as Prema Paavuraalu in 1992.

== Plot ==
Karan is a poor mechanic who lives in the countryside with his only daughter Suman. He decides to try his luck in business and travel to Dubai so he can earn enough to get his daughter married. Karan decides to leave her with his old friend Kishan. Kishan, now a wealthy businessman in a big city, allows Suman to stay at his house while her father is away as he cannot turn down his old friend's request. Suman is befriended by Kishan's young son Prem, who assures her that a boy and a girl can be platonic friends. Prem takes Suman to a party organised by Seema, who is the only daughter of Kishan's business partner Ranjeet. Jeevan is a proud and arrogant nephew of Ranjeet, who humiliates Suman and Prem, accusing them of falsely claiming and pretending to be "just friends". Suman leaves the party in tears and distances herself from Prem. At that point, Prem and Suman realise they have fallen in love with each other.

Prem's mother Kaushalya probes deeper into Prem and Suman's relationship and approves of Suman as her daughter-in-law. However, Kishan disapproves of the relationship as he is of the opinion that Karan is of a lower status than he is and is further brainwashed by Ranjeet who claims that Suman has taken advantage of his hospitality and is feigning love for Prem to marry into his wealthy family. Kishan asks her to leave his house. Karan returns from abroad and gets enraged at Kishan's behaviour for mistreating his daughter. Kishan accuses him of plotting to set up Suman with Prem. Karan and Kishan quarrel and part ways. Eventually, Karan and Suman return to their village, deeply humiliated. Prem learns about what has transpired and refuses to accept the separation. He goes to the village and begs to be allowed to marry Suman.

Enraged by Kishan's behaviour, Karan initially refuses, but eventually says he will allow the marriage on one condition: Prem must prove that he can support his wife through his own effort and live separately. Prem accepts the challenge and begins to work as a truck driver and labourer in the nearby quarry. At the end of the month, Prem earns the required money. On the way to Karan's house, Prem is ambushed by Jeevan and a group of ruffians who attempt to kill him but survive. However, the currency notes of his wages are all ruined in the fight. Karan harshly dismisses Prem's effort on seeing the soiled notes and disbelieves Prem's story about the ruffians' attack. Prem then begs for another chance to prove himself, and his sincere determination melts Karan's heart, and agrees to allow Suman to marry Prem.

Meanwhile, Ranjeet goes to Kishan and tells him that Karan has killed his son. Unable to believe this, Kishan travels to Karan's village only to find Prem alive and well. When Prem confronts Jeevan, Ranjeet and his supporters manhandle both Kishan and Karan, while Jeevan abducts Suman. Prem, Karan, and Kishan join hands to defeat a common enemy — Ranjeet, Jeevan, and Ranjeet's supporters. Ranjeet's leg is broken in the fight and his supporters are arrested. Jeevan is chased to a cliff by Prem, where Suman hangs off a branch. After a fight with Jeevan, Prem attempts to lower himself down with a rope to save her, and Jeevan is attacked by a dove (the same one that he tried to kill earlier but was stopped by Suman), till he falls off the cliff. Suman and Prem climb up the cliff to safety. Jeevan, who is hanging on the branch, attempts to intervene, but instead is pecked in the face by the bird and falls to his death just as a mining bomb explodes. Karan and Kishan's estrangement comes to an end when Prem and Suman marry and live happily ever after.

== Cast ==
- Salman Khan as Prem Chaudhary: Suman's love-interest
- Bhagyashree as Suman: Prem's love-interest
- Alok Nath as Karan: Suman's father
- Rajeev Verma as Kishan Kumar Chaudhary: Prem's father
- Reema Lagoo as Kaushalya Chaudhary: Prem's mother and Kishan's wife
- Ajit Vachani as Ranjeet
- Mohnish Bahl as Jeevan: Ranjeet's nephew
- Laxmikant Berde as Manohar Singh
- Harish Patel as Rahim
- Huma Khan as Gulabiya
- Pervin Dastur as Seema: Ranjeet's daughter
- Dilip Joshi as Ramlal "Ramu" Singh
- Deep Dhillon as Lal
- Raju Shrivastava as Shambhu
- Shreechand Makhija as Prabhu

== Production ==
=== Casting ===
The casting of the lead actor was complex. Several newcomers auditioned for the role of 'Prem', including Vindu Dara Singh, Deepak Tijori, and Faraaz Khan. While Faraaz Khan, son of the actor Yusuf Khan who played the villainous Zabisco in Amar Akbar Anthony (1977), was almost finalised for the role, he was replaced at the last minute due to health issues. Barjatya tested Shabina Dutt for the lead actress role. Dutt failed the screen test and Barjatya asked if she could suggest an actor for the lead. She suggested Salman Khan, with whom she had done an ad film. Salman Khan was not particularly interested because of the soft nature of the film and Barjatya was not very happy with Khan's first audition. Sooraj wasn't convinced by Salman's acting prowess and started looking for another actor to play the role. Khan too, started suggesting names for who could be Prem in the film, after he was told that he didn't fit the bill. Barjatya eventually convinced him to do it, and Khan has since then expressed his gratitude to Barjatya for making him a star. Barjatya loved Tom Cruise's Top Gun jacket so much that he designed one on the similar lines for Khan in Maine Pyar Kiya. Like Tom Cruise's jacket, which had patches of logos and emblems of the American Army, Navy and Air Force insignia, and other badges from the defence forces, Khan's jacket too had similar insignias pasted on it. Barjatya then cast Bhagyashree to star opposite Salman Khan. Bhagyashree, who had a lead role in Amol Palekar's TV show Kachchi Dhoop, had refused to do the film as she wanted to pursue higher studies. Barjatya made several changes to the script; Bhagyashree eventually agreed to do the film. Though Salman recommended Bahl for the villain's role, veteran actress and Mohnish Bahl's mother Nutan was not happy with her son playing villain's role in the film. Nutan, who shared a good rapport with the Barjatyas, had reportedly also asked if Mohnish could fit in other roles. Makers assured her that Bahl's character would be remembered for a long time to come. Barjatya picked Perveen from the English stage to play the negative role. The film also marked the debut of Laxmikant Berde.

=== Filming ===
Prior to the film's production, Rajshri Productions was struggling financially, and was on the verge of closing down. Director/writer Sooraj Barjatya's father Rajkumar Barjatya suggested the story of Maine Pyar Kiya and His Father's Friend was Legendary filmmaker Tarun Majumdar suggested the script of Maine Pyar Kiya. Barjatya spent ten months writing the screenplay for Maine Pyar Kiya. The film had a production budget of ₹2 crore (US$1.23 million). Bhagyashree got paid ₹100,000 (US$6,163.78) while Salman Khan was paid ₹31,000 (US$1,910.77) for the film. In addition to the production budget, another ₹10 lakh (US$61,637.84) was spent on the soundtrack's radio publicity. The first sequence filmed was the office scene where Rajiv Verma tells Salman that he has to go. Barjatya had large sets in Film City, Mumbai, where filming took place continuously over 5 to 6 months. The outdoor scenes were filmed in Ooty. Additional production credits include dance choreographer — Jay Borade, art—Bijon Das Gupta, action—Shamim Azim and editor—Mukhtar Ahmed.

== Music ==
The soundtrack album and musical score were composed by Raamlaxman, while the lyrics were written by Dev Kohli and Asad Bhopali. It was produced under the Saregama label and featured singers such as Lata Mangeshkar, S. P. Balasubrahmanyam, Usha Mangeshkar, Shailendra Singh and Sharda Sinha. The soundtrack consists of 11 songs including the "Antakshari" (excerpts from different Bollywood songs), which was used when the characters play a game. The soundtrack was very successful upon release, becoming the best-selling Bollywood soundtrack of the decade. Maine Pyaar Kiya became His Master's Voice's highest-seller album and created history by selling over 5 million cassettes and it is still reported to be selling more. The film's soundtrack album sold over 10 million units, and became the best-selling soundtrack of the year and the decade (an accolade that it shares with the soundtrack of the 1989 film Chandni). It gave a thrust to the career of Raamlaxman, who, although existed since the 1970s and was composing for mainstream movies, was yet to find popularity.

== Release ==
Maine Pyar Kiya premiered on 29 December 1989 across India. The film initially saw a very limited release, with only 29 prints, before later going on to add a thousand more as the film picked up. Maine Pyar Kiya was dubbed in English as When Love Calls. A 125-minute version was the biggest hit in the Caribbean market in Guyana and also dominated the box-office collections in Trinidad and Tobago. The Telugu version Prema Paavuraalu ran for more than 200 days; 25 weeks at Visakhapatnam and had 100 plus day run at six centres in Andhra Pradesh. It was dubbed in Tamil-language as Kaadhal Oru Kavithai and in Malayalam as Ina Praavukal. Maine Pyar Kiya had also been dubbed in Spanish as Te Amo.

== Reception ==
=== Box office ===
The film was the biggest grosser of 1989 and one of India's highest-grossing films. Made on a budget of around ₹1 crore, it went on to earn a profit of over ₹20 crore by 1990, saving Rajshri from closing down. Maine Pyar Kiya grossed ₹40 crore ($17 million), equivalent to ₹500 crore ($77 million) adjusted for inflation in 2017. (Note: 1993 inflation rate of 17.83 times: Darr's domestic net of ₹107,375,000 in 1993 equivalent to ₹1,914,360,020 in 2017.) It became the highest-grossing Indian film of the 1980s.

Overseas, the film was a huge hit in the Caribbean, dominating the box office that year in Guyana and Trinidad and Tobago. The film also saw a ten-week run in Lima, Peru.

Box Office India described it as an "all-time blockbuster". Manmohan Desai even calling Maine Pyar Kiya "the biggest hit since Alam Ara" (1931). In terms of ticket sales, Maine Pyar Kiya sold over 79.7 million tickets in India.

=== Critical response ===
Maine Pyar Kiya received favorable reviews. Trade Guide lists it as one of the eight greatest hits ever. India Today summarized, "Music is one of the key ingredients of its success. The songs have melody; the feelings come through – a throwback to the '60s. Moreover, Sooraj uses the songs to take his story further. It is also that touch of innocence". Sukanya Verma called, "Dil deewana appears first to celebrate Salman Khan and Bhagyashree's happily-ever-after aspirations in Maine Pyar Kiya and once again when standard rich versus poor conflicts threaten its realisation." The Times of News wrote, "Sooraj Barjatiya's Maine Pyar Kiya is one such classic film of the 90s that made Salman Khan an overnight star". Stardust said, "In the hands of a sincere director, the most hackneyed of commercial film plots can be made to look fresh and new. Unlike other young directors of his generation, Sooraj also knows the value of a good script and spends more time writing his script than in actual production."

=== Accolades ===
Award	Category	Recipient(s) and nominee(s)	Result	Ref(s)
35th Filmfare Awards	Best Film	Rajshri Productions	Won	
35th Filmfare Awards	Best Male Debut	Salman Khan	Won	
35th Filmfare Awards	Best Female Debut	Bhagyashree	Won	
35th Filmfare Awards	Best Music Director	Raamlaxman	Won	
35th Filmfare Awards	Best Lyricist	Asad Bhopali for "Dil Deewana"	Won	
35th Filmfare Awards	Best Male Playback Singer	S. P. Balasubrahmanyam for "Dil Deewana"	Won	
35th Filmfare Awards	Best Director	Sooraj Barjatya	Nominated	
35th Filmfare Awards	Best Actor	Salman Khan	Nominated	
35th Filmfare Awards	Best Actress	Bhagyashree	Nominated	
35th Filmfare Awards	Best Supporting Actress	Reema Lagoo	Nominated	
35th Filmfare Awards	Best Comedian	Laxmikant Berde	Nominated	
35th Filmfare Awards	Best Lyricist	Dev Kohli for "Aate Jaate Hanste Gaate"	Nominated	

== See also ==
- List of highest-grossing Indian films
