= Shakti – Astitva Ke Ehsaas Ki =

Indian social drama television series

- Genre: Drama
- Created by: Rashmi Sharma
- Written by: Rashmi Sharma Shanti Bhushan Madhu Pandey Vikram Khurana
- Screenplay by: Shilpa F D'Mello; Sancheeta Bose; Dialogues; Sharad Chandra Tripathi
- Directed by: Pankaj Kumar
- Creative directors: Rohit K Mukherjee; Soniaa Mehta; Palash Mandol; Asma Ashfaque
- Starring: See below
- Theme music composer: Anand Raaj Anand
- Country of origin: India
- Original language: Hindi
- No. of seasons: 1
- No. of episodes: 1360

Production
- Producers: Rashmi Sharma; Pawan Kumar Marut
- Cinematography: Danny; Santosh
- Camera setup: Multi-camera
- Running time: 21 minutes approx.
- Production company: Rashmi Sharma Telefilms

Original release
- Network: Colors TV
- Release: 30 May 2016 – 1 October 2021

Shakti — Astitva Ke Ehsaas Ki (transl. Strength — feeling of existence) is an Indian Hindi-language social drama television series produced by Rashmi Sharma Telefilms airing from 30 May 2016 to 1 October 2021 on Colors TV. It starred Vivian Dsena, Rubina Dilaik, Jigyasa Singh, Simba Nagpal and Cezanne Khan. This show is the fourth longest-running television show of Colors TV.

== Plot ==
Set in rural Punjab, Maninder and his mother Nalini try to bury the one-year-old Soumya alive. They are caught by Nimmi who saves her and warns Maninder that if he and Nalini try to kill Soumya again, she will not spare them.

Soumya is a quiet and simple girl, raised lovingly by Nimmi but is hated by Maninder and Nalini. Her sister, Surbhi receives all of their father and grandmother's love and attention.

Now grown up, Soumya mostly lives inside. Currently in college, Surbhi teaches a lesson to the spoilt troublemaker Harman. Vengeful, he vows to punish her but mistakenly kidnaps Soumya. Harman's father, Harak Singh orders Harman to marry Soumya in order to avoid social embarrassment. They marry and soon fall in love. Nimmi reveals Soumya's truth that she is an intersex.

This leaves Harman enraged, but he later starts loving Soumya. Knowing Soumya's truth, Harman's mother, Preeto, traumatizes Nimmi, who dies of cardiac arrest. Later, Preeto asks Soumya to pitch Harman and Surbhi. For Soumya's sake, the two marry but Surbhi later divorces Harman in order to not come between him and Soumya. Preeto tells the truth to Harman that she first married Harak's elder brother, but after few years of marriage he left her, then she married Harak Singh and they give birth to Harman and Raavi. Harak's nephew, Varun, who hates Harak, marries Surbhi to remain close to them pretending to be supportive. Eventually, Preeto realizes her misdeeds and accepts Soumya.

After numerous twists, Varun is finally disowned by Harak, who finds out his intentions. Pregnant, Surbhi returns from Delhi. In a confrontation, Varun ends up accidentally injuring her. Before dying, Surbhi delivers a son, Soham and hands over Soumya his responsibility. Varun is jailed for Surbhi's murder.

Preeto again starts hating Soumya, as she had to do widow's ritual, after her first husband, Nihaal's death. Thus, Soumya leaves them with Soham and lives in Mallika's community. She takes care of Vedant Bansal, who falls for her. As she rejects him, Vedant gets Harman jailed to blackmail Soumya. Soumya fakes her marriage to save Harman, who misunderstood her. In envy, Harman marries Mahi.

Soon after, Harman has liver problems due to excessive drinking. Mahi is pregnant. Harman finds out the truth about Soumya and Vedant's fake marriage and how Vedant threatened Soumya. He comes to save her but gets assumed dead as Vedant pushes him off a cliff and thus is jailed. Soumya and Preeto reunite and adopt Vedant's nephew, Rohan. Later, Mahi delivers an intersex child and disowns her. Soumya and Preeto stop Mahi and take responsibility of the child. Harak names the child Heer, unaware of her truth.

Heer is a bubbly girl, brought up by Soumya and Preeto. On knowing her truth, Harak intends to kill Heer but is arrested. Bailed, Varun returns and tries to get Soham back. But Maninder exposes he killed Surbhi so Soham disowns him. The police allows Harak to meet Preeto. Harak asks to send Soumya away if she wants him to accept Heer. Preeto agrees; Soumya leaves with a tearful goodbye but vows to return after years.

Heer is grown into a strong girl and is fiercely protected by Soham and Rohan. Heer falls in love with Virat and they elope to marry. However, Preeto reveals Heer's truth to Virat who initially hates her. Later, Virat realizes that he loves Heer and hides her truth. Virat and Heer marry. Eventually, everyone learns Heer's long-hidden truth. Heer blames her family for hiding her truth but soon understands their love for her. Angel manipulates Heer into joining their clan. Later, Virat comes to get her but gets beaten up. Heer falls off a cliff and presumed died while trying to save Virat.

After 6 months, Heer is shown to be alive and working as a caretaker and namesake family member of Dr. Akshay's family. Virat has gone mad. Heer returns to her family finding about Virat, who recovers and reunites with her. They are attacked by Angel. Soumya returns home after 16 years to protect her family. Surprisingly back and alive, Harman also reconciles with the family after years, proving he is Harman, though his face changed (as he got surgery). Angel is jailed. Soumya and Harman unite with Heer after years, who also remarries Virat. Heer hires a maid Gitu, who is molested by Virat's brother, Daljit. Heer fights for Gitu's justice but is killed by Parmeet, Daljeet and Sant Baksh.

Soumya, Harman and Virat eventually learn about Heer's death. They make Parmeet, Daljeet and Santbaksh confess their crime who get arrested. Raavi's son, Chintu returns to destroy Harak's family. Preeto and Soumya save a transgender baby from being buried alive. They adopt the child, being supported by entire family. Chintu and Angel team up to snatch the family happiness, but finally realize their mistakes. Preeto names the baby as Shagun. Soumya wills to protect and raise her by letting her know her truth. The show ends on a happy note, with the family united.

== Cast ==
=== Main ===
- Rubina Dilaik as Soumya Singh: An Intersex; Maninder and Nimmi's daughter; Surbhi's sister; Harman's wife; Harak and Preeto's daughter-in-law; Heer's step-mother; Rohan's adoptive-mother (2016—2020; 2021)
  - Mahira Khurana as Child Soumya Singh (2016)
- Vivian Dsena as Harman Singh: Harak and Preeto's son; Soumya's husband, Heer's father; Rohan's adoptive father (2016—2019)
  - Cezanne Khan replaced Vivian Dsena as Harman Singh (2021)
- Jigyasa Singh as Heer Virat Singh: An Intersex; Harman and Mahi's daughter; Soumya's stepdaughter; Chintu and Soham's cousin; Virat's wife (2020–2021)
  - Sumaiya Khan as Child Heer Singh (2019–2020)
- Simba Nagpal as Virat Singh: Parmeet and Sant Baksh's younger son; Daljeet and Simran's brother; Heer's widower (2020–2021)

=== Recurring ===
- Kamya Panjabi as Preeto Kaur Singh: Payal's daughter; Sukhwinder's sister; Nihaal's ex-wife; Harak's wife; Harman and Raavi's mother; Chintu and Heer's grandmother (2016–2021)
- Sudesh Berry as Harak Singh: Nihaal, Veeran and Harjeet's brother; Preeto's husband; Harman and Raavi's father; Chintu and Heer's grandfather (2016–2021)
- Lakshya Handa as Varun Singh: Harjeet and Amarinder's son; Surbhi's ex-husband; Sweety's husband; Soham's father (2016–2019; 2019–2020)
- Garima Jain as Raavi Singh: Preeto and Harak's daughter; Harman's sister; Balwinder and Jeet's ex-wife; Chintu's mother (2016–2018)
  - Pooja Singh replaced Jain as Raavi (2018–2021)
- Bhuvan Chopra as Veeran Singh: Nihaal, Harak and Harjeet's brother; Shanno's husband; Sindhu and Praval's father (2016–2021)
- Aarya Rawal as Shanno Singh: Veeran's wife; Sindhu and Praval's mother (2016–2021)
- Ekta Singh as Mallika Khanna: Transgender; Milkha's sister; Soumya's mother-figure (2016–2021)
- Kajol Saroj as Kareena: Transgender; Soumya and Heer's enemy (2016–2018; 2019; 2020; 2021)
- Tushar Kawale as Chintu "Angad" Singh: Raavi and Balwinder's son (2021)
- Nidhi Bhavsar as Sindhu Khurana: Veeran and Shanno's daughter; Praval's sister; Ankush's wife (2019–2020)
  - Vaani Sharma replaced Bhavsar as Sindhu (2020–2021)
  - Ashlesha Thakur as Child Sindhu Singh (2016–2017)
- Meherzan Mazda as Rohan Singh: Rekha and Vidhaan's son; Soumya's adoptive son; Simran's husband (2020–2021)
  - Meet Mukhi as Child Rohan Singh (2019–2020)
- Avinash Mukherjee as Soham Singh: Surbhi and Varun's son; Soumya and Harman's adopted son (2020)
  - Vivaan Yogesh Sharma as Child Soham Singh (2019–2020)
- Sarika Dhillon as Mahi Singh: Harman's ex-wife; Heer's mother (2019–2021)
- Parag Tyagi as DSP Sant Baksh Singh: Baksh's son; Tejinder's brother; Parmeet's husband; Daljeet, Simran and Virat's father (2020–2021)
- Gauri Tonk as Parmeet Singh: Sant Baksh's wife; Daljeet, Simran and Virat's mother (2020)
  - Jasveer Kaur replaced Tonk as Parmeet (2020–2021)
- Rachana Mistry: Parmeet and Sant Baksh's daughter; Daljeet and Virat's sister; Rohan's wife (2020–2021)
  - Visha Vira as Simran Singh replaced Mistry (2021)
- Aakash Talwar as Daljeet Singh: Parmeet and Sant Baksh's elder son; Simran and Virat's brother; Gurwinder's husband (2020–2021)
- Ekroop Bedi as Gurwinder Singh: Daljeet's wife (2020–2021)
- Nimisha Vakharia as Tejinder Singh: Baksh's daughter; Sant Baksh's sister (2020)
- Kanwarjit Paintal as Baksh Singh: Sant Baksh and Tejinder's father; Daljeet, Simran and Virat's grandfather (2020)
- Sonam Arora as Angel: Transgender; Maharani's disciple; Soumya and Heer's enemy (2020–2021)
- Roshni Sahota as Surbhi Singh: Nimmi and Maninder's younger daughter; Soumya's sister; Harman and Varun's ex-wife; Soham's mother (2016–2018)
  - Iti Kaurav replaced Sahota as Surbhi (2018–2019)
  - Tasheen Shah as Child Surbhi Singh (2016)
- Reena Kapoor as Nimmi Kaur Singh: Anjana's daughter; Maninder's wife; Soumya and Surbhi's mother; Soham's grandmother (2016)
- Ayub Khan as Maninder Singh: Nalini's son; Nimmi's widower; Soumya and Surbhi's father; Soham's grandfather (2016–2019; 2019–2020)
- Dishi Duggal as Anjana Singh: Nimmi's mother; Soumya and Surbhi's grandmother; Soham's great-grandmother (2016–2019) (Dead)
- Mamata Luthra as Nalini Singh: Maninder's mother; Soumya and Surbhi's grandmother; Soham's great-grandmother (2016–2019; 2019–2020)
- Tanvi Kishore as Sweety Singh: Varun's wife (2019)
- Prakash Ramchandani as Nihal Singh: Harak, Veeran and Harjeet's brother; Preeto's ex-husband (2019) (Dead)
- Rishikesh Ingley as Balwinder Singh: Kishanlal's son; Raavi's former husband; Chintu's father (2017–2019)
  - Kush Sharma replaced Ingley as Balwinder (2021)
- Krutika Desai Khan as Payal Singh: Preeto and Sukha's mother; Harman, Raavi and Garry's grandmother (2018)
- Jaswant Menaria as Sukhwinder Singh: Payal's son; Preeto's brother; Sunaina's husband; Gurmeet's father (2019)
- Shivani Gosain as Sunaina Singh: Sukhwinder's wife; Gurmeet's mother (2019)
- Rohit Chandel as Gurmeet Singh: Sunaina and Sukhwinder's son (2019)
- Sahil Uppal as Vedant Bansal: Sunil's son; Rekha's brother; Soumya's obsessive lover (2019)
- Shweta Sinha as Rekha Bansal: Sunil's daughter; Vedant's sister; Vidhaan's wife; Rohan's mother (2019)
- Rajesh Puri as Sunil Bansal: Harak and Harman's business partner; Rekha and Vedant's father; Rohan's grandfather (2019)
- Ayaz Ahmed as Arjun: Vedant's ally (2019)
- Hitanshu Jinsi as Ankush Khurana: Sindhu's husband (2019)
- Preeti Puri as Dr. Gayatri Mathur (2019)
- Avisha Shahu as Reet Mathur: Gayatri's daughter; Heer, Rohan and Soham's friend (2019)
- Rohit Roy as Nishant Bhalla (2019)
- Emir Shah as Monty: Harman's friend (2016)
- Shivani Chakraborty as Mahima: Shanno's relative; Harman's ex-fiancée (2016)
- Mahi Sharma as Kalsi: Soumya and Surbhi's best friend (2016–2017)
- Kishori Shahane as Sharmani: Transgender (2016–2017)
- Sara Khan as Mohini: Harak's former mistress (2017–2018)
- Anand Goradia as Maharani: Transgender; Soumya's enemy from Bangkok; Angel's mentor (2017; 2018; 2019)
- Chhavi Awasthi as Chameli: Transgender (2017–2021)
- Sonal Handa as Jeet Singh: Motilal's son; Jasleen's brother; Raavi's former husband (2018)
- Amrita Prakash as Jasleen Kaur Singh: Motilal's daughter; Jeet's sister; Harman's childhood friend (2018)
- Hemant Choudhary as Motilal Singh: Jasleen and Jeet's father; Harak's friend (2018)
- Dheeraj Gumbar as Sumit Kapoor: Surbhi's business partner and friend (2018)
- Sahil Mehta as Sameer Singh: Gopika's son; Soumya's obsessive lover (2018)
- Tiya Gandwani as Dr. Lavneet Kaushal: Harman's obsessive lover (2018)
- Alka Mogha as Gopika Singh: Sameer's mother (2018)
- Shiva Gupta as Esha: Heer's friend (2020)
- Prerna Panwar as Nutan: Transgender; Heer's best friend (2020)
- Sonyaa Ayoddhya as Jharna Narula: Uttam's daughter; Virat's former fiancée (2020)
- Naveen Saini as DIG Uttam Narula: Jharna's father (2020)
- Sikandar Kharbanda as Indrajit Shergill (2020)
- Aniruddh Dave as Shyam: Transgender; Angel's partner (2021)
- Pankaj Bhatia as Jagjit Singh: Jatinder's elder son; Akshay's brother; Archana's husband (2021)
- Bhawna Hada / Kaveri Priyam as Dr. Isha Hooda: Virat's childhood friend (2021)
- Anahita Jahabaksh as Jatinder Kaul: Jagjit and Akshay's mother; Kuhu's grandmother (2021)
- Neha Narang as Archana Kaul: Jagjit's wife (2021)
- Kapil Nirmal as Jeet (2021)
- Sanjeev Siddharth as Harishchandra: Jeet's grandfather (2021)
- Puneett Chouksey as Dr. Akshay Kaul: Jatinder's younger son; Jagjit's brother; Kuhu's father; Heer and Virat's friend (2021)
- Salman Shaikh as Arjun Randhawa: Kamini's son; Nayantara's brother; Simran's ex-boyfriend (2021)
- Dharti Bhatt as Nayantara Randhawa: Kamini's daughter; Arjun's sister; Virat's former bride (2021)
- Unknown as Kamini Randhawa: Parmeet's childhood friend; Arjun and Nayantara's mother (2021)
- Paras Zutshi as Guru: Heer and Virat's friend (2021)
- Abigail Jain as Riya (2019)
- Mouli Ganguly as Shruti Bhalla (2019)
- Nikita Sharma as Archana Kapoor (2019)
- Rushad Rana as Advocate Navjot Chaddha (2019)
- Ronit Roy as Advocate Rajat Singh (2019)
- Preetika Chauhan as Sneha Singh (2019)
- Roopal Tyagi as Manasvi (2019)

=== Special appearances ===
- Salman Khan to promote Big Boss 10 (2016)
- Parineeti Chopra and Ayushmann Khurrana to promote Meri Pyaari Bindu (2017)
- Jay Soni as Bakool Vasavda from Bhaag Bakool Bhaag (2017)
- Helly Shah as Devanshi Bakshi from Devanshi (2017)
- Piyush Sahdev as Pavan Bakshi from Devanshi (2017)
- Varun Kapoor as Dr. Veer Malhotra from Savitri Devi College & Hospital (2017)
- Swarda Thigale as Dr. Saachi Malhotra/Mishra from Savitri Devi College & Hospital (2017)
- Vikram Sakhalkar as Dr. Kabir Kapoor from Savitri Devi College & Hospital (2017)
- Meera Deosthale as Chakor Rajvanshi from Udaan (2017)/(2018)
- Sahil Uppal as Kunal Singhania from Ek Shringaar-Swabhiman (2017)
- Sangeita Chauhan as Meghna Singhania from Ek Shringaar-Swabhiman (2017)
- Sidharth Shukla as Parth Bhanushali from Dil Se Dil Tak (2017)
- Rashami Desai as Shorvori Parth Bhanushali from Dil Se Dil Tak (2017)
- Jasmin Bhasin as Teni Bhanushali from Dil Se Dil Tak (2017)
- Arjun Bijlani as Deep Raj Singh/Deep Raichand from Ishq Mein Marjawan (2018)
- Aalisha Panwar as Aarohi Raichand from Ishq Mein Marjawan (2018)
- Ritvik Arora as Ahaan Dhanrajgir from Tu Aashiqui (2018)
- Sanjay Dutt and Aditi Rao Hydari to promote Bhoomi (2017)
- Krystle D'Souza as Roopa from Belan Wali Bahu (2018)
- Harshad Chopda as Aditya Hooda from Bepannah (2018)
- Jannat Zubair Rahmani as Pankti Dhanrajgir from Tu Aashiqui (2018)
- Affan Khan as Young Roopendra Singh Vaghela to promote Roop - Mard Ka Naya Swaroop (2018)
- Ankita Lokhande on Ganesh Chaturthi (2018)
- Mouni Roy on Ganesh Chaturthi (2018)
- Gauahar Khan on Ganesh Chaturthi (2018)
- Shashank Vyas as Roopendra Singh Vaghela from Roop - Mard Ka Naya Swaroop (2018)
- Avika Gor as Anushka Sangwan from Laado 2 (2018)
- Drashti Dhami as Nandini Thakur from Silsila Badalte Rishton Ka (2018)
- Aashish Kaul as Milkha Singh Khanna – Mallika's brother (2019)
- Arjit Taneja as Azaan from Bahu Begum (2019)
- Samiksha Jaiswal as Noor from Bahu Begum (2019)
- Kunal Jaisingh as Reyansh Khurana from Pavitra Bhagya (2020)
- Nimrit Kaur Ahluwalia as Meher from Choti Sarrdaarni (2020)
- Siddharth Kumar For Online Promotion of NIIT Class (2021)
- Meenakshi Sharma as Meenakshi: Akshay's former's girlfriend, Kuhu's mother (only in flashbacks) (2021)

== Production ==
=== Casting ===
After a ten-year leap in June 2016, child actors Mahira Khurrana and Tasheen Shah were replaced by Rubina Dilaik and Roshni Sahota respectively. Vivian Dsena was roped in as the male lead. Besides them Kamya Panjabi, Sudesh Berry, Garima Jain, Bhuvan Chopra, Aarya Rawal, Ashlesha Thakur and Lakshya Handa joined the cast.

In November 2016 Reena Kapoor quit the series and her character Nimmi died. It had a crossover with Sasural Simar Ka in April 2017 and Savitri Devi College & Hospital in June 2017. In August 2017 Anand Goradia was chosen to play Maharani. In November 2017 Sara Khan bagged the series as Mohini. Three months later, Jain left the show and was replaced by Pooja Singh. Later Amrita Prakash was roped in to play Jasleen. Some other new cast entered including Sahil Mehta, Hemant Choudhary, Alka Mogha and Sonal Handa.

Afterwards Krutika Desai Khan played Payal but she later quit the show. The same month Sahota too quit. During Soumya and Harman's memory loss story, Tiya Gandwani joined the cast as Lavneet Kaushal whereas Mehta and Mogha returned. In very late of December 2018 Iti Kaurav replaced Sahota as Surbhi, but quit after a short 10 episodes in January 2019, before Jaswant Menaria, Shivani Gosain and Rohit Chandel joined the cast. In March 2019, Rohit Roy, Ronit Roy, Mouli Ganguly and Roopal Tyagi were cast and Aashish Kaul appeared in a special appearance.

Next month, Nidhi Bhavsar and Hitanshu Jinsi entered. In May 2019, Nikita Sharma and Prakash Ramchandani were seen in the series. In June 2019, Sahil Uppal entered in a negative role along with Rajesh Puri. In July 2019, Sarika Dhillon became a part of the show. Next month, Shweta Sinha was cast for a short appearance and Dsena quit because of not wanting to play a father, as a five-year leap was confirmed.

In September 2019, child actors Sumaiya Khan, Vivaan Sharma and Meet Mukhi were cast in the series. In October 2019, Mamta Luthra, Handa and Ayub Khan returned while Preeti Puri and Avisha Shahu became a part of the show. Initially the 16 year leap was planned for November 2019, but got extended to January 2020. Dilaik quit the show, and several actors joined the cast, with Jigyasa Singh and Simba Nagpal as new leads. Others included Avinash Mukherjee, Meherzan Mazda, Parag Tyagi, Gauri Tonk, Kanwarjit Paintal, Aakash Talwar, Vaani Sharma, Ekroop Bedi and Rachana Mistry. In February 2020, Sonyaa Ayodhya, Prerna Panwar and Naveen Saini were hired. In late June 2020 actress Gauri Tonk quit the show and was replaced by Jasveer Kaur. In October 2020, Avinash Mukherjee also left the show.

In February 2021, Aarya Rawal who played as Shanno quit the show. In March 2021, Rubina Dilaik joined the show again. In April 2021, Cezanne Khan replaced Vivian Dsena and joined the show as Harman Singh.

== Music ==
The songs "Title Song", "Tera Ishq Hai Meri Ibaadat" and "Jag Begana Hoya Na Peer" were composed by Anand Raaj Anand. The songs were sung by Shahid Mallya, Richa Sharma, Yashika Sikka and Siddharth Amit Bhavsar. "Dil kyun Teri Aur chala re" was composed by Sargam Jassu and Nakash Aziz.

SI.no	Title	Singer(s)	length
1	Shakti (Title Song)	Richa Sharma	3:31
2	Tera Ishq Hai Meri Ibadat	Shahid Mallya and Richa Sharma	5:00
3	Jag Begana Hoya Na Peer	Anand Raaj Anand	03:50
4	Dil Kyun Teri Aur Chala Re	Yashika Sikka & Siddharth Amit Bhavsar	03:15
5	Yeh Nasiba Bhi Kya Cheez Hai	Richa Sharma	3:01

== Reception ==
The show has been dubbed into multiple languages, including Hindi, Bengali, Bahasa Indonesia, Bahasa Melayu, Nepali, Tamil, and Thai, with Kannada being another notable dubbed language mentioned.

In late 2016, Shakti – Astitva Ke Ehsaas Ki achieved a TRP rating of 3.9 making it a top-rated show that week. The show was reported to have taken the No. 1 spot on the TRP charts at some point.
