= Sahil Uppal =

Indian television actor (born 1990)

- Born: 8 August 1990 (age 36); Noida, Uttar Pradesh, India
- Education: Deshbandhu College, Delhi
- Occupations: Actor; model
- Years active: 2014–present
- Spouse: Aakriti Atreja (m. 2022)

Sahil Uppal is an Indian actor known for his works in Hindi television series, including Ek Shringaar-Swabhiman, Shakti, Pinjara Khubsurti Ka and Pandya Store.

== Personal life ==
Sahil Uppal was born on 8 August 1990 in Noida, India. He graduated from Deshbandhu College, Delhi.

On 8 December 2022, Uppal married his longtime girlfriend, Aakriti Atreja in Jaipur, Rajasthan.

== Career ==
=== Debut and breakthrough (2014–2018) ===
Uppal made his acting debut in 2014 with P.S. I Hate You, where played Kabeer alongside Chandni Bhagwanani. He then appeared in Maharakshak Devi as Tiger in 2015. From 2015 to 2016 he played Aarav Seth in Pavitra Bandhan. He then portrayed Ajay Malhotra in the supernatural thriller Brahmarakshas — Jaag Utha Shaitan in 2016.

Uppal portrayed Kunal Singh Chauhan / Kunal Singhania opposite Sangeita Chauhan in Ek Shringaar-Swabhiman from 2016 to 2017. It was produced under the banner Rajshri Productions.

In 2018, he played Virat Chopra in Jeet Gayi Toh Piya Morey alongside Yesha Rughani. The same year, he was seen as the antagonist Angraj Vyas opposite Sheen Das in Piyaa Albela.

=== Further career and success (2019–present) ===
In 2019, he played Vedant Bansal in Shakti — Astitva Ke Ehsaas Ki alongside Rubina Dilaik. He was seen as Dilaik's obsessed lover. The same year the appeared in an episode of Laal Ishq with Urvashi Sharma. He also appeared in the music video 'Kyun' alongside Meenakshi Chaudhary.

Uppal portrayed Omkar "Omi" Sanyal in Pinjara Khubsurti Ka opposite Riya Sharma from 2020 to 2021. The show took a reincarnation leap in 2021, he then played Omkar Vashisht. The show ended in 2021.

Uppal will next appear in the film First Second Chance alongside Devoleena Bhattacharjee and Renuka Shahane. He will also appear alongside Antara Biswas in Hungama Play's web series Challava. In May 2023, he played the lead role Vedant Sinha in Dangal TV's Jyoti... Umeedon Se Sajee.

From 2023 to 2024, Uppal has portrayed Yashodhan "Chiku" Pandya, in StarPlus' popular show Pandya Store.

In 2026 Uppal is playing Vikram in Naagin 7.

== Other work ==
Uppal emerged as the 2nd runner-up of Pantaloons Fresh Face contest in 2012. He has been part of many TVC and print campaigns including Big Bazar, Tata and Kingfisher beer.

== Filmography ==
=== Television ===
| Year | Title | Role | Notes | Ref(s) |
|---|---|---|---|---|
| 2014 | P.S. I Hate You | Kabeer | | |
| 2015 | Maharakshak Devi | Tiger | | |
| 2015–2016 | Pavitra Bandhan | Aarav Seth | | |
| 2016 | Brahmarakshas | Ajay Malhotra | | |
| 2016–2017 | Ek Shringaar Swabhiman | Kunal Singh Chauhan / Kunal Singhania | Lead role | |
| 2018 | Jeet Gayi Toh Piya Morey | Virat Chopra | | |
| 2018 | Piyaa Albela | Angraaj Vyas | | |
| 2019 | Shakti – Astitva Ke Ehsaas Ki | Vedant Bansal | | |
| 2019 | Laal Ishq | Nikat | Episode: Paatal Ke Danav | |
| 2020–2021 | Pinjra Khoobsurti Ka | Omkar "Omi" Shukla | Lead Role | |
| 2021 | Pinjra Khoobsurti Ka | Omkar Vashisht | Lead Role | |
| 2023 | Jyoti... Umeedon Se Sajee | Vedant Sinha | Lead Role | |
| 2023–2024 | Pandya Store | Yashodhan "Chiku" Pandya | Supporting Role | |
| 2024–2025 | Saajha Sindoor | Gagan | Lead Role | |
| 2026 | Naagin 7 | Vikram | | |

==== Special appearances ====
| Year | Title | Role | Notes | Ref. |
|---|---|---|---|---|
| 2017 | Dil Se Dil Tak | Kunal Singh Chauhan | | |
| 2020 | Ishq Mein Marjawan 2 | Omkaar Sanyal | | |
| 2020 | Shaandar Ravivaar | Himself | | |
| 2021 | Namak Issk Ka | Omkaar Sanyal | | |

=== Web series ===
| Year | Title | Role | Notes | Ref(s) |
|---|---|---|---|---|
| 2022 | First Second Chance | Ajit Kulkarni | | |
| 2022 | Hasratein | Atul | Episode: "Shararat Bai" | |
| 2023 | Fuh se Fantasy | Raunak | Episode: "Celebrity Love" | |
| 2026 | Chehra Ya Naqab | Agastya | Microdrama | |
| 2026 | Koi Naam Na Do 1 & 2 | Anshul | YouTube | |

=== Music videos ===
| Year | Title | Singer(s) | Label | Ref(s) |
|---|---|---|---|---|
| 2019 | Kyun | Jyotica Tangri, Sushant (Rinkoo) | Times Music | |
