= Dil Se Dil Tak =

- Genre: Drama; Romance
- Created by: Shashi Mittal; Sumeet Hukamchand Mittal
- Written by: Shashi Sumeet Mittal; Sumeet Hukamchand Mittal; Manali Karia; Manali Mahyavanshi; Shobhit Jaiswal; Sameer Mishra
- Starring: See below
- Opening theme: "Dil Se Dil Tak" by Saurabh Kalsi: Mitthi Si Dua; Sadiyon Se Bhi Purani
- Country of origin: India
- Original language: Hindi
- No. of seasons: 1
- No. of episodes: 345

Production
- Producers: Shashi Sumeet Mittal; Sumeet Hukamchand Mittal
- Cinematography: Sudesh Kotian; Prateek Singh
- Camera setup: Multi-Camera
- Running time: 20 minutes approx.
- Production company: Shashi Sumeet Productions

Original release
- Network: Colors TV
- Release: 30 January 2017 – 1 June 2018

Dil Se Dil Tak (transl. Heart to Heart) is an Indian Hindi-language love triangle show that was loosely based on the 2001 Bollywood film Chori Chori Chupke Chupke. The series aired on Colors TV from 30 January 2017 to 1 June 2018 and starred Sidharth Shukla, Rashami Desai, Jasmin Bhasin, Rohan Gandotra and Iqbal Khan.

== Plot ==
Parth Bhanushali, the heir to the conservative and affluent Bhanushali family based in Vadodara, falls in love with and marries their Bengali employee Shorvori Bhattacharya at the cost of being disowned by his family.

Shorvori is pregnant and Parth's family accepts her. An unfortunate accident results in Shorvori's miscarriage, rendering her infertile. She and Parth hide the miscarriage from his family. Teni, a carefree Gujarati wanting to settle in the US, is chosen by Parth and Shorvori as a surrogate in return for sending her to the US. She gets pregnant with the couple's child via IVF. Shorvori introduces Teni as her cousin to the family. They start to live together. Teni slowly falls in love with Parth and ends up confessing it to him. They are in turmoil after the revelations regarding Teni's pregnancy as Parth accepts the baby to be his. The family eventually accepts the surrogacy situation. Due to a misunderstanding, Shorvori ends her relationship with Parth, thinking that he has an extramarital affair with Teni and is cheating on her. Teni discovers that Shorvori has a fatal brain tumour and pretends to leave Parth to help him deal with her impending death. Shorvori sends divorce papers. Parth is suspicious of her behaviour. Shorvori meets with an accident and is presumed dead. Parth struggles to cope with the pain of losing her. Teni convinces him to move on. Due to a misunderstanding, Parth accuses Teni of murdering Shorvori. Teni goes into premature labour and delivers a girl named Ipshita. With Teni's life in danger, Parth donates blood to save her life. In return, she fulfils his demand that she leave the house. Eventually, Parth realises that Teni did not kill Shorvori. He develops a love for Teni. When she plans to leave for the US, Parth confesses his love and she accepts his proposal. Shorvori is actually alive and was in a coma. Shorvori arrives to reclaim Parth on his wedding day but leaves, seeing him with Teni. The two reach Nainital to find Shorvori. In Nainital, she starts working as a music teacher. Parth believes he was imagining Shorvori and consummates his marriage with Teni. However, they come across Shorvori. All of them arrive home. Teni tries to leave the family. However, the three of them decide to live together. Misunderstandings arise between Shorvori and Teni, who is about to leave but falls and loses her memory. Shorvori understands that Parth loves Teni more than her and blesses him. Suspecting that Bhanushali wants to sell her off, Teni runs away from their home.

Shorvori is dead. Teni has been missing. The family sees Teni's traits in Ipshita. Teni leads a happy life in Delhi and is a sales manager who is about to marry Iqbal. Circumstances lead to Parth and Teni meeting each other. Confused, Teni moves back to Baroda to find out about her past. Bhanushali tells Teni everything, and she regains her memory as well as feelings for Parth. Teni decides to marry Iqbal who calls off the wedding. He gives them his blessings as he just wants Teni to be happy. As Iqbal leaves, Parth and Teni finally reunite living happily with Ipshita and their family.

== Cast ==
=== Main ===
- Sidharth Shukla as Parth Bhanushali: Ramnik and Indu's eldest son; Jagruti's brother; Shorvori and Teni's husband; Ipshita's father (2017)
  - Rohan Gandotra replaced Sidharth Shukla as Parth Bhanushali (2017–2018)
- Rashami Desai as Shorvori Parth Bhanushali: Parth's first wife; Ipshita's mother (2017–2018)
- Jasmin Bhasin as Teni Parth Bhanushali: Parth's second wife; Ipshita's surrogate and stepmother (2017–2018)

=== Recurring ===
- Tej Sapru as Purushottam Bhanushali: Patriarch of Bhanushali family; Ambika's husband; Ramnik, Shyamnik and Jalpa's father; Parth, Sejal, Suyog, Jagruti, Sparsh and Jayu's grandfather; Ipshita's great-grandfather (2017−2018)
- Dolly Minhas as Ambika Purushottam Bhanushali: Matriarch of Bhanushali family; Ramnik, Shyamnik and Jalpa's mother; Parth, Sejal, Suyog, Jagruti, Sparsh and Jayu's grandmother; Ipshita's great-grandmother (2017−2018)
- Sachin Parikh as Ramnik Bhanushali: Purushottam and Ambika's son; Shyamnik and Jalpa's brother; Indu's husband; Parth and Jagruti's father; Ipshita's grandfather (2017−2018)
- Vaishnavi Mahant as Indu Ramnik Bhanushali: Poyni's sister; Ramnik's wife; Parth and Jagruti's mother; Ipshita's grandmother (2017−2018)
- Chahat Tewani as Ipshita Bhanushali – Parth and Shorvori's daughter; Teni's surrogate and stepdaughter (2018)
- Iqbal Khan as Iqbal Hafeez: Waheeda's son; Teni's ex-fiancé; Parth's friend (2018)
- Himani Sharma as Sejal Bhanushali: Poyni’s daughter; Suyog’s sister (2017–2018)
- Gouri Agarwal as Jagruti Bhanushali: Ramnik and Indu's youngest daughter; Parth's younger sister (2017–2018)
- Mayank Arora as Rishabh (2017)
- Urvashi Upadhyay as Poyni Shyamnik Bhanushali: Indu's sister; Shyamnik's wife; Sejal and Suyog's mother (2017–2018)
- Karan Goddwani as Suyog Bhanushali: Poyni and Shyamnik's son; Sejal's brother; Forum's husband (2017)
- Pooja Singh as Forum Suyog Bhanushali: Suyog's wife (2017)
- Khyaati Keshwani as Jalpa Bharat Kumar (née Bhanushali): Purushottam and Ambika's daughter; Ramnik and Shyamnik's sister; Bharat's wife; Jayu's mother; Sparsh's step-mother (2017–2018)
- Jignesh Joshi as Dr. Bharat Kumar: Jalpa's husband; Jayu's father (2017–2018)
- Yashkant Sharma as Chutkan: Teni's younger brother
- Kanika Maheshwari as Madamji (2017)
- Abhilash Chaudhary as Munna (2017)
- Puja Sharma as Priya: Bharat's ex-girlfriend; Sparsh's mother (2017)
- Abha Parmar as Waheeda Hafeez: Gul's sister; Iqbal's mother (2018)
- Zubeida Verma as Gul: Waheeda's sister; Rashida's mother (2018)
- Tamanna Arora as Rashida: Iqbal's ex-fiancée/cousin, Gul's daughter (2018)
- Vansh Sayani as Sparsh Kumar: Bharat's and Priya's son, Jalpa's stepson (2017)
- Kunal Verma as Aman Patel: Teni's ex-fiancè (2017)

=== Special appearances ===
- Samridh Bawa as Karan Singh Chauhan from Ek Shringaar-Swabhiman
- Sahil Uppal as Kunal Singh Chauhan from Ek Shringaar-Swabhiman
- Ankitta Sharma as Naina Karan Singh Chauhan from Ek Shringaar-Swabhiman
- Sangeita Chauhan as Meghna Kunal Singh Chauhan from Ek Shringaar-Swabhiman
- Avika Gor as Anushka Sangwan from Laado 2

== Production ==
The series is produced by Shashi Sumeet Productions of Shashi Mittal and Sumeet Hukamchand Mittal. The series was initially titled Sangharsh. Later, its title was changed to Dil Se Dil Tak.

=== Casting ===
Earlier, Mishal Raheja was finalised to play the lead role in the series which was tentatively titled 'Sangharsh'. He was being considered for playing Salman Khan's character from the film Chori Chori Chupke Chupke on whose storyline this show is based. Then, there were also rumours that Shashank Vyas would play the lead, but he took up Jaana Na Dil Se Door, which he had signed for a year earlier.In September 2016, Shukla replaced Raheja to play the lead role. Around the same time, Jasmin Bhasin was finalized for the role played by Preity Zinta in Chori Chori Chupke Chupke. There were rumours that Chhavi Pandey would be romancing Raheja in the series and would play the role of Rani Mukherjee from the film Chori Chori Chupke Chupke. Finally, in late September, Rashami Desai was chosen for the role. Later, the show's title was changed to Dil Se Dil Tak. Thus, finally, Desai, Shukla and Bhasin were finalized to play the lead roles in Dil Se Dil Tak. In March 2017, Manish Raisinghan auditioned for the role played by Shukla in the show but later Shukla decided not to walk out of the show. After a few months, Desai's character was shown to have been killed in a car accident when she decided to leave the show. Later, in December 2017, Shukla finally left the show and was replaced by Rohan Gandotra. In January 2018, Desai made a comeback in the series but left the series in March 2018 when her character was shown to have died in the show. Iqbal Khan entered the series to play the lead role along with Gandotra and Bhasin. It then starred Gandotra, Bhasin and Khan in lead roles.

== Reception ==
The series gained early popularity because of Sidharth Shukla and Rashami Desai's onscreen chemistry. The series' target rating points (TRPs) declined after the actors left the show, and the series ended on 1 June 2018. The series was replaced by the Colors TV drama Silsila Badalte Rishton Ka from 4 June 2018.
