= Sonam Bisht =

Miss Uttarakhand contestant

- Born: Dehradun, India
- Occupation: Television Actress
- Years active: 2013-present
- Television: Lajwanti (TV series)

Sonam Bisht is an Indian beauty pageant and reality show contestant turned television actress.

She hails from Dehradun and studied at Kendriya Vidyalaya Hathibarkala. In 2013 she was the first runner-up in the Miss Uttarakhand contest. She took part in the 2014 Miss India contest.

That same year, she was also a contestant in the third season of reality show India's Best Cinestars Ki Khoj.

In 2015, she landed a role in Zee TV's show Lajwanti. She is currently seen in Star Plus's soap opera Suhani Si Ek Ladki where she plays the negative lead, Yuvraj's second wife.

== Television ==
Year	Show	Character	Role
2015–2016	Lajwanti	Dulari Bharadwaj	Main protagonist turned antagonist
2016–2016	Suhani Si Ek Ladki	Balwinder Yuvraj Birla/Barbie	Main antagonist
