= Ticket to Bollywood =

- Creative director: Vishal Mull
- Presented by: Manasi Scott & Vikram Thapa
- Judges: Mukesh Chhabra, Mahima Chaudhary, Jasbir Jassi, Kunal Kohli
- Original language: Hindi

Production
- Executive producers: Monica Narula & Gunjan Mehrish
- Cinematography: K Ravi

Ticket to Bollywood is a reality show produced by Urban Brew Studios for NDTV and aired on NDTV Prime - India's first 2-in-1 channel on weekdays for two months, beginning from 17 March 2014.

The finale was aired on 6 June 2014. The reality show was judged by the casting director Mukesh Chhabra, Bollywood actress Mahima Chaudhary and singer Jasbir Jassi. Jassi was later replaced by director Kunal Kohli.

The winners of the show were Arjun Fauzdar and Ankitta Sharma.

== Format ==
Hosted by singer-actor-dancer, Manasi Scott and entertainment journalist Vikram Thapa, the show auditioned almost 30,000 people across the country of which 31 were selected and a further shortlisted 20 made it to the finals.

The reality show was sponsored by Videocon D2H and VLCC. The 20 contestants were mentored by prominent Bollywood figures like Gauahar Khan, Ashley Lobo, Rajpal Yadav and many others. The main acting mentor for the contestants was Rajesh Khera who was an integral part of the reality show that spanned over 2 months of rigorous workshops and performances.

== Winners ==
The winners of the reality show were announced in the grand finale. Arjun Fauzdar from Delhi and Ankitta Sharma from Chandigarh were declared winners and were announced to be starring in the first NDTV and Urban Brew production which would also feature Bollywood actor Shahrukh Khan.
