= Ishq Jabariya =

Indian Hindi Drama television series

- Genre: Drama; Romance
- Screenplay by: Nitika Kanwer
- Story by: Rajesh Saksham; Sonakshi Khandelwal; Vera Raina; Priyom Jha (Dialogue)
- Directed by: Sahib Siddiqui
- Starring: Siddhi Sharma; Lakshay Khurana
- Opening theme: "Ishq Jabariya"
- Country of origin: India
- Original language: Hindi
- No. of seasons: 1
- No. of episodes: 300

Production
- Producers: Shyamasheesh Bhattacharya; Neelima Bajpayee
- Production location: Bihar
- Cinematography: Akshat Jayakar; Abhishek Basu
- Editors: Jaskaran Dosanjh; Rajkumar Gupta
- Running time: 20-21 min approx.
- Production company: Shakuntalam Telefilms

Original release
- Network: Sun Neo
- Release: 16 June 2024 – 9 May 2025

Ishq Jabariya is a 2024 Indian Hindi-language romantic television drama series produced by Shyamasheesh Bhattacharya and Neelima Bajpayee under the banner of Shakuntalam Telefilms. It aired on 16 June 2024 to 09 May 2025 on Sun Neo and digitally premiered on Sun NXT. It stars Siddhi Sharma and Lakshay Khurana.

== Cast ==
- Siddhi Sharma as Gulki Awasthi: Mrs. Tiwari's elder daughter; Madhumita's step-daughter; (2024–2025)
- Lakshay Khurana as Aditya Awasthi: Sudha's biological son; (2024–2025)
- Pankaj Motla as Mangal Tiwari: Madhumita's eldest son; (2024–2025)
- Kamya Panjabi as Mohini Awasthi: Priyam's wife; Aditya's paternal aunt and adoptive mother; Nithin's mother (2024–2025)

=== Recurring ===
- Afzal Khan as Priyam Awasthi: Mohini's husband; (2024–2025)
- Adnan Khan as Nitin Awasthi: Mohini and Priyam's son; (2024–2025)
- Pankaj Parashar as Jugnu Awasthi: Priyam's younger brother; (2024–2025)
- Kajal P Ahuja as Mrs. Jugnu Awasthi: Jugnu's wife; (2024–2025)
- Pallavi Mahara as Shwetha Awasthi: Jugnu and Mrs. Jugnu's elder daughter; (2024–2025)
- Shagun Matta as Priya Awasthi: Jugnu and Mrs. Jugnu's younger daughter; (2024–2025)
- Akshaya Bhingarde as Sudha Awasthi: Aditya's biological mother (2024–2025)
- Pranoti Pradhan as Madhumita "Amma Ji" Tiwari: Mangal and Som's mother; (2024–2025)
- Pankaj Motla as Mangal Tiwari: Madhumita's eldest son; (2024–2025)
- Abhinav Attri as Som Tiwari: Madhumita's youngest son; (2024–2025)
- Vriddhi Tiwari as Anshu: Madhumita's henchwomen (2024)
- Eva Shirali as Mrs. Tiwari: Gulki and Nisha's mother (2025) (Dead)
- Zara Kabir as Nisha Tiwari: Madhumita's step-daughter; (2024–2025)
- Deepshikha Nagpal as Devi Sahay: Vyom's mother (2025)
- Aditya Syal as Vyom Sahay: Devi's son; Gulki's one sided obsessive lover (2025) (Dead)
- Aarchi Sachdeva as Anu: Ritwik's wife; (2024)
- Rishaabh Chauhan as Ritwik: Anu's husband; (2024)
- Amayira Sharma as Biniya: Ritwik and Anu's daughter (2024)
- Amika Shail as Dr. Manisha; Aditya's Caretaker (2025)

== Production ==
=== Development and casting ===
The series was announced by Shakuntalam Telefilms in May 2024 and was confirmed by Sun Neo. Initially, Siddhi Sharma and Lakshay Khurana were signed to play the lead roles while Kamya Punjabi were signed to play the negative lead of this show.

=== Release ===
The first promo was released on 18 May 2024 featuring Siddhi Sharma and Lakshay Khurana.

== See also ==
- Saajha Sindoor
