= Saajha Sindoor =

Indian drama television series

- Genre: Drama; Romance
- Screenplay by: Gautam Hegde
- Story by: Purendu Shekhar; Aakriti Atreja; Raghuveer Shekhawat (Dialogue)
- Directed by: Nandita Mehara Akhilesh-Bhagat-Kushal Awasthi
- Starring: Sahil Uppal; Stuti Goyal; Krutika Desai
- Opening theme: Saajha Sindoor
- Country of origin: India
- Original language: Hindi
- No. of seasons: 1
- No. of episodes: 199

Production
- Producers: Bhairavi Raichura; Purendu Shekhar; Nandita Mehra
- Production location: Rajasthan
- Cinematography: Sadanand Pillai
- Editor: Sachin Shinde
- Running time: 20-21 min approx.
- Production company: 24 Frames Media

Original release
- Network: Sun Neo
- Release: 16 June 2024 – 15 February 2025

Saajha Sindoor (transl. Shared Vermillion) is an Indian drama television series which was aired on Sun Neo on 16 June 2024 to 15 February 2025 and digitally premiered on Sun NXT under the banner of 24 Frames Media. It stars Sahil Uppal, Stuti Goyal and Krutika Desai.

== Plot ==
The show follows the journey of Phooli, a young woman whose life takes a tragic turn when her groom dies on their wedding day, leaving her an unmarried widow. The story unfolds as Phooli confronts numerous hardships and societal challenges.

== Cast ==
=== Main ===
- Sahil Uppal as Gagan
- Stuti Goyal as Phooli
- Krutika Desai as Dhara

=== Recurring ===
- Neelu Vaghela as Hukum
- Anjali Gupta as Saraswati
- Nasir Khan as Jaswant
- Sangita Ghosh as Saroj
- Ram Mehar Jangra as Kamal
- Akshat Varshney as Ajay
- Krish Chauhan
- Khushi Mali as Rani
- Nazneen Khan as Divya
- Ruchi Kaushal

== See also ==
- Sun TV Network
- Ishq Jabariya
