= Gharjamai =

Son-in-law who lives in a house of his wife's family

The term gharjamai, in Hindi, refers to a resident son-in-law who lives in a house of his wife's family.

== Etymology ==
The word Gharjamai is a compound of two words: Ghar and Jamai. The word Ghar is derived from Sanskrit word Gr̥ha (गृह) meaning house and Jamai is derived from Sanskrit word jāmātr̥ (जामातृ) meaning son in law. Thus Gharjamai refers to the resident son-in-law.

== Definition ==
A man who lives in a house of his wife is known as Gharjamai. He usually lives with his wife's family or depends on his wife's family for support. The term carries a social stigma, as husband is traditionally considered responsible for running the household and depending on the wife's family for support is held in a negative view. In more modern usage, the overall financial position of the son-in-law is considered and taken into account when using this label; if, for example, the son-in-law possesses land or other property, he is not considered a Gharjamai. Varying definitions exist, however. Films and TV serials both with a serious and light hearted view have been made about this phenomenon.

== In popular culture ==
=== Movies ===
Year	Language	Movie	Actor
1961	Hindi	Sasural	Rajendra Kumar
1967	Hindi	Ram Aur Shyam	Pran
1968	Hindi	Do Kaliyaan	Biswajit Chatterjee
1968	Hindi	Aashirwad	Ashok Kumar
1968	Hindi	Neel Kamal	Mehmood
1969	Hindi	Dharti Kahe Pukar Ke	Sanjeev Kumar
1969	Hindi	Paisa Ya Pyaar	Biswajit Chatterjee
1973	Hindi	Phagun	Dharmendra
1974	Hindi	Bidaai	Jeetendra
1976	Hindi	Tapasya	Asrani
1981	Hindi	Nakhuda	Raj Kiran
1982	Hindi	Dulha Bikta Hai	Raj Babbar
1982	Hindi	Khud-Daar	Vinod Mehra
1982	Hindi	Kaamchor	Suresh Oberoi
1983	Hindi	Rishta Kagaz Ka	Sudhir
1983	Hindi	Avtaar	Gulshan Grover
1983	Hindi	Mazdoor	Raj Babbar
1986	Hindi	Peechha Karro	Farooq Sheikh
1986	Hindi	Anubhav	Sujit Kumar
1987	Hindi	Pyar Ke Kabil	Rishi Kapoor
1988	Hindi	Biwi Ho To Aisi	Kader Khan
1989	Hindi	Jaisi Karni Waisi Bharnii	Shakti Kapoor
1989	Hindi	Billoo Badshah	Sumeet Saigal
1989	Hindi	Chandni	Anupam Kher
1990	Hindi	Ghar Ho To Aisa	Kader Khan
1990	Hindi	Jamai Raja	Anil Kapoor
1992	Hindi	Ghar Jamai	Mithun Chakraborty
1993	Hindi	Aasoo Bane Angaarey	Anupam Kher
1994	Hindi	Laadla	Anil Kapoor
1996	Hindi	Sautela Bhai	Raj Babbar
1996	Hindi	Raja Ki Aayegi Baaraat	Mohnish Bahl
1996	Hindi	Namak	Preetam Oberoi & Gulshan Grover
1997	Hindi	Yes Boss	Aditya Pancholi
1998	Bengali	Jamai No. 1	Ranjit Mallick
2000	Hindi	Beti No. 1	Prem Chopra
2001	Hindi	Zubeidaa	Vinod Sharawat
2001	Hindi	Ek Rishtaa: The Bond of Love	Mohnish Bahl
2001	Hindi	Love Ke Liye Kuch Bhi Karega	Saif Ali Khan
2001	Hindi	Kyo Kii... Main Jhuth Nahin Bolta	Sharad Kapoor
2008	Bengali	Ghar Jamai	Prosenjit Chatterjee
2009	Hindi	Chal Chala Chal	Asrani & Manoj Joshi
2009	Hindi	Ek: The Power of One	Jaspal Bhatti & Sanjay Mishra
2016	Hindi	Ki & Ka	Arjun Kapoor
2019	Punjabi	Munda Hi Chahida	Ravi Aneja
2019	Hindi	Jhootha Kahin Ka	Omkar Kapoor
2019	Hindi	Bala	Saurabh Shukla
2020	Punjabi	Jaan To Pyara	Deputy Raja
2020	Hindi	Gulabo Sitabo	Amitabh Bachchan
2023	Hindi	Shehzada	Ronit Roy
2023	Punjabi	Ji Wife Ji	Karamjit Anmol & Lucky Dhaliwal & Roshan Prince
2023	Hindi	Kathal	Dherendra Kumar Tiwari
2023	Punjabi	Carry on Jatta 3	Binnu Dhillon
2023	Punjabi	Kade Dade Diyan Kade Pote Diyan	Sukhwinder Chahal
2023	Hindi	Dry Day	Juned
2024	Hindi	Sarfira	Saurabh Goyal
2025	Hindi	Aap Jaisa Koi	Kumar Kanchan Ghosh & Shashie Vermaa
2025	Punjabi	Godday Godday Chaa 2	Ashok Tangri & Amrit Amby
2025	Hindi	Kis Kisko Pyaar Karoon 2	Kapil Sharma

=== TV Series ===
Year	TV series	Actor
1986	Ghar Jamai	Anant Mahadevan
1997	Margarita	Milind Soman
1997-98	Ghar Jamai	R. Madhavan
1997-98	Ghar Jamai	Ashiesh Roy
1999–2009	Yes Boss	Rakesh Bedi
1995–2006	Hum Paanch	Ali Asgar
2001–04	Khichdi	Kamlesh Oza
2005	Instant Khichdi	Kamlesh Oza
2002-06	Piya Ka Ghar	Imran Khan/Hoshang Govil
2005–09	Saat Phere: Saloni Ka Safar	Ashish Kapoor
2010–11	Baat Hamari Pakki Hai	Vivek Mushran
2012–13	Jhilmil Sitaaron Ka Aangan Hoga	Jitendra Trehan/Saurabh Dubey
2012–13	Jhilmil Sitaaron Ka Aangan Hoga	Rakesh Paul
2012–13	Jhilmil Sitaaron Ka Aangan Hoga	Praveen Hingonia
2012–13	Jhilmil Sitaaron Ka Aangan Hoga	Pankaj Tiwari
2014–17	Jamai Raja	Ravi Dubey
2015	Dil Ki Baatein Dil Hi Jaane	Sailesh Gulabani

=== Books ===
Year	Book	Author
1961	A House for Mr. Biswas	V. S. Naipaul
