= Simba Nagpal =

Indian actor and model (born 1996)

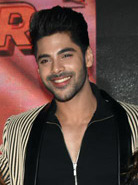
- Nagpal in 2022
- Born: 25 September 1996 (age 29); Delhi, India
- Education: Sushant School of Art and Architecture; Ansal University
- Occupations: Actor; model
- Years active: 2018–present

Simba Nagpal (born 25 September 1996) is an Indian actor and model who predominantly works in Hindi television. He is best known for starring as Virat Singh in Shakti Astitva Ke Ehsaas Ki (2020–2021) and Rishabh Gujral in Naagin 6 (2022). He also participated in Bigg Boss 15 (2021).

== Early life and education ==
Nagpal was born on 25 September 1996 in Delhi, India. He completed his secondary education in Sushant School of Art and Architecture. He later completed his bachelor's in Ansal University, Gurgaon.

== Career ==
Nagpal made his first appearance in the reality show MTV Splitsvilla 11 in 2018 as a contestant and finished in 8th place. In 2019, he auditioned for another reality show, MTV Roadies, but didn't make it through the culling round. Later that same year, Nagpal made his acting debut with a leading role as Virat Singh in Colors TV's soap opera Shakti - Astitva Ke Ehsaas Ki, opposite Jigyasa Singh.

After the show ended in 2021, he participated in Colors TV's reality show Bigg Boss 15, where he finished in 16th place. However, his instincts in the house were praised by host Salman Khan, who commented, "You're moving ahead with dignity and in a dignified way".

In 2022, Nagpal joined the Balaji Telefilms thriller supernatural franchise Naagin for its sixth season, where he portrayed Rishabh Gujral in Naagin 6 opposite Tejasswi Prakash. Initially, the show received criticism because of its storyline, however, it later won hearts, particularly for the chemistry between the lead pair, and gained better ratings. In December 2022, he quit the show after the leap.

From September 2023 to February 2024, he was seen as Jay Khurana opposite Shivangi Joshi in Sony TV's Barsatein – Mausam Pyaar Ka.

== Filmography ==
=== Television ===
Year	Title	Role	Notes	Ref.
2018	Splitsvilla 11	Contestant	8th place	
2020–2021	Shakti – Astitva Ke Ehsaas Ki	Virat Singh		
2021	Bigg Boss 15	Contestant	16th place	
2022	Naagin 6	Rishabh Gujral/Shakti Gujral		
2022	Dance Deewane Juniors 1	Himself	Guest	
2022	Saavi Ki Savaari	Rishabh Gujral	Special appearance	
2023–2024	Barsatein – Mausam Pyaar Ka	Jay Khurana		
2025	Sajan Ji Ghar Aaye Family Kyun Sharmaye	Aman Sinha		

=== Music videos ===
Year	Title	Singer	Ref.
2022	I Swear	Shibani Kashyap	
2022	Sohnea	Himanshu Jain	
2023	Murshida	Arijit Singh	
2023	Munda Ho Gaya Pagal	Dev Negi	
2025	Ishq Naiyo	Prateek Gandhi	

== See also ==
- List of Indian television actors
