= Ankitta Sharma =

Indian television actress (born 1998)

- Born: 31 May 1994 (age 32); Chandigarh, India
- Occupation: Actress
- Years active: 2011–present
- Television: Lajwanti; Ek Shringaar-Swabhiman

Ankitta Sharma is an Indian television actress. She is the winner of Ticket to Bollywood. She made her television debut with Lajwanti (TV series). Ankitta is best known for portraying the role of Naina Chauhan in Ek Shringaar-Swabhiman. She has also appeared in Yeh Vaada Raha (TV series) as the antagonist and in Laal Ishq (2018 TV series). She played the lead role in ZEE5 series Ishq Aaj Kal and recently appeared in The Whistleblower.

== Early life and career ==
Sharma hails from Chandigarh and entered acting after winning the reality show Ticket to Bollywood in 2014. She made her television debut with the Zee TV's historical show Lajwanti playing the lead role.

She gained attention after playing the female lead in the Colors TV family drama Ek Shringaar-Swabhiman opposite Samridh Bawa.

In 2021, she is cast as the lead role in the Sony Liv OTT webseries - The Whistleblower.

== Filmography ==
=== Television ===
Year	Show	Role	Channel	Notes
2012	PTC Miss Punjaban 2012	Contestant	PTC Punjabi	Pageant
2014	Ticket to Bollywood	Contestant	NDTV India	Winner
2015-2016	Lajwanti	Lajwanti Kaur Bhardwaj	Zee TV	Female Lead
2016	Bigg Boss 10	Herself	Colors TV	Celebrity guest
2016	Yeh Vaada Raha (TV series)	Meher Khanna	Zee TV	Antagonist
2016–2017	Ek Shringaar-Swabhiman	Naina Solanki Singh Chauhan	Colors TV	Main Female Lead
2017	Rising Star	Herself	Colors TV	Celebrity guest
2017	Sasural Simar Ka	Naina Solanki	Colors TV	Special appearances
2017	Dil Se Dil Tak	Naina Solanki	Colors TV	Crossover Episodes
2018	Laal Ishq	Radhika	&TV	Episodic Role

=== Films ===
Year	Film	Role	Language	Notes
2013	Udeek	Rajjo	Punjabi	Short film
2014	Baaz		Punjabi	Female lead’s younger sister

=== Web series ===
Year	Series	Role	Platform	Notes
2019	Ishq Aaj Kal	Alia Jaffri	ZEE5	
2021	The Whistleblower	Dr. Pragya	Sony LIV	
2022	Wrong Way	Ankita	Hotstar	

== Awards and nominations ==
Year	Award	Category	Show	Result
2015	Zee Rishtey Awards	Favourite Beti	Lajwanti	Nominated
2015	Zee Rishtey Awards	Favourite Pati-Patni Rishta (with Sid Makkar)	Lajwanti	Nominated
2015	Zee Rishtey Awards	Favourite Nayi Jodi (with Sid Makkar)	Lajwanti	Won
