= Piyaa Albela =

Indian television soap opera

- Genre: Drama
- Created by: Sooraj Barjatya
- Developed by: Sooraj Barjatya; Devaansh Barjatya
- Written by: Rahul Modi
- Screenplay by: Ritu Goel; Rachel Navare
- Story by: Abhijit Sinha; Tanya Sinha
- Directed by: Toton Karmakar
- Creative directors: Raghvendra Singh Surabhi Horo; Fatema Rangila
- Starring: Akshay Mhatre; Sheen Das; Sahil Uppal
- Theme music composer: Tyson Paul; Nishant - Raja
- Opening theme: Mora Piyaa... Albela (My lover is Unique.)
- Country of origin: India
- Original language: Hindi
- No. of seasons: 2
- No. of episodes: 383

Production
- Executive producer: Vishesh Suri
- Producer: Sooraj Barjatya
- Cinematography: Sanjay Memane; Anil Katke
- Editors: Shashank Harendra Singh; Krishna Mahto
- Running time: 22 minutes
- Production company: Rajshri Productions

Original release
- Network: Zee TV
- Release: 6 March 2017 – 24 August 2018

Piyaa Albela (transl. Beloved Gallant) is an Indian soap opera by Rajshri Productions broadcast on Zee TV. The show focuses on a modern retelling of the love story of Menaka and Vishwamitra. It was produced over about eight years by Sooraj Barjatya, while Raghvendra Singh wrote the lyrics. The soap opera stars Akshay Mhatre and Sheen Das. The show began airing from 6 March 2017, replacing Jamai Raja, and went off air on 24 August 2018. It was replaced by Tujhse Hai Raabta.

== Plot ==
Naren Vyas is from an affluent family, and his parents want Pooja Goel as his caretaker. The two become friends, and Pooja falls in love with him after he saves her from being raped by his cousin Rahul.

Naren has an arranged marriage with Surbhi Singhania—the daughter of his father's friend Yash—and Pooja agrees to marry Dr. Anand. When Naren's cousin Mayank also falls for Pooja, he kills Anand. Naren marries Pooja, and Surbhi weds Rahul.

One year later, Pooja returns as Mrs. Kapoor, while Naren has become a womanizer. Pooja's friend, Mr Kapoor, tries to solve Pooja and Naren's misunderstanding but Rahul misleads Ashish into believing that Pooja has fallen in love with him. Ashish joins hands with Rahul and Surbhi, and Naren falls in their trap by proposing to Surbhi. Pooja records Ashish's confession and stops Surbhi and Naren's wedding. Naren apologises to Pooja but Ashish comes between and tries to kill Naren. Pooja shoots Ashish and Naren takes the blame. Kapoor reaches the court on time and vindicates Pooja.

Pooja and Naren's wedding preparations begin but Pooja has an accident while praying for Supriya's recovery, who recovers and stops Mayank's father Rakesh from attacking Pooja. After her accident, Pooja starts behaving like a child. Her uncle, Satish Gupta, takes Pooja with him to their hometown, Dehradun. To stop her from being sent to a mental asylum, Naren marries her and takes care of her.

It is revealed that Pooja has been feigning her illness to save Naren's grandfather from Kapoor, who has been threatening to expose that Naren is not Supriya and Harish's biological son. Kapoor kidnaps Pooja who kills him to protect Kashinath. Planning on ending her act, Pooja's half-sister Naina Goel reveals Pooja's secret to Naren, causing him to become furious with Pooja.

Naren's health deteriorates from his excessive drinking. Pooja discovers Naren's real mother, Chandrika, who is a prostitute. To hide this truth from the Vyas family, Satish and Pooja lie that Pooja is Chandrika's illegitimate daughter while Naina is Satish's legitimate niece. The Vyas family, except for Kashinath, start hating Pooja. Chandrika is allowed to stay with the family in the Vyas mansion but is blamed for an attack on Supriya. The misunderstanding leads to Pooja and Chandrika leaving the house.

Six months later, Mayank is dead. Pooja lives in Krishnapuri, a red-light district with Chandrika. Naren is running for elections and visits Pooja every day at Krishnapuri. Everyone thinks that Naren does this because he loves Pooja but only Chandrika, the Vyas family and Naren's assistant Danish know that Naren hates Pooja. Pooja continues to fulfil her duty as a wife.

Naren hires a shooter to kill Pooja. On a trip to Dehradun, Naren realises Pooja's trust in him, calls the sharpshooter to abort. and Naren and Pooja consummate their marriage. At Naren's election rally, Pooja is shot at and Naren discovers that a woman called the sharpshooter to carry put the attack. He realises Pooja was aware of his initial plan and apologises but Pooja loses all trust in him. They expose Naina as the culprit behind causing Supriya's attack and resulting paralysis, framing Chandrika for the attack, killing Mayank, abducting a heavily pregnant Surbhi, planning to kill Rahul, and marry Naren.

Kashinath reveals that Naren is Chandrika's son. A heartbroken Naren leaves the Vyas mansion. At an ashram, Naren and Pooja renew their marital vows. They meet Bela and Praveen, another newly-wed couple. Instigated by Rahul, Harish decides to kill Naren but Harsha, Naren's aunt, warns Pooja and Naren. Naren and Praveen have an accident and Praveen dies while Naren, needing a heart-transplant, receives Praveen's heart, and Naren begins to behave like Praveen. It is revealed that Bela is planning to take revenge on Praveen's parents. Under Bela's spell, Naren abducts Praveen's parents and Bela kills them but spares Naren for saving her father. Bela then surrenders to the police.

Naren's adoptive sister Meghna is blind and is about to marry her lover Kunal Goenka. On their wedding day, Meghna is raped and Naren is under suspicion, as he was absent from the venue. Pooja saves Naren from the accusations. Anuj Gupta, Danish, Rahul and Kunal are suspected later. The real culprit, Hardik Vyas, tries to kill Surbhi and Pooja when they discover his real identity. Surbhi loses her child. Hardik is arrested and Meghna and Kunal are married.

Angraj, Harish and Supriya's biological son, enters the Vyas mansion and sets his eyes on Pooja, who he used to harass before her marriage, and starts plotting to kill Naren. On the day of Pooja's birthday, Anuj shoots Angraj but Naren shoots Anuj. Both Angraj and Anuj die causing tension between Naren and Pooja's families.

Angraj is revealed to be alive and gets plastic surgery, and returns with Naren's face and kidnaps the real Naren, taking his place at home. Supriya kills Angraj, and she manages his estate. Rahul and Surbhi have a baby boy, Anuj's wife Rachel marries Rahul's half brother Arjun Vyas (Khushwant Walia), and Pooja gets pregnant with Naren's child.

== Cast ==
=== Main ===
- Akshay Mhatre as Naren Vyas
  - Veer Bhanushali as young Naren
- Sheen Dass as Pooja Vyas (née Goel)
- Sahil Uppal/Akshay Mhatre as Angraj Vyas

=== Recurring ===
- Kanwarjit Paintal as Kashinath Vyas
- Avinash Wadhawan as Harish Vyas
- Aankit Hs Vyas as Rahul Vyas
- Jyoti Gauba as Supriya Vyas
- Jaya Binju Tyagi as Chandrika Mehra
- Vijay Kalvani as Hardik Vyas
- Parul Chaudhary as Neelima Vyas
- Ritu Chauhan as Surbhi Vyas (née Singhania)
- Khushwant Walia as Arjun Vyas
- Chaitrali Gupte as Harsha Kaushal (née Vyas)
- Farooq Saeed as Rakesh Kaushal
- Tushar Khanna as Mayank Kaushal
- Gulki Joshi as Naina Kaushal (née Goel)
- Khalid Siddiqui as Ashish Kapoor
- Saptrishi Ghosh as Yash Singhania
- Mamta Verma as Shilpa Singhania
- Sangeita Chauhan as Meghna Goenka
- Rakesh Kukreti as Chandrakant Goenka
- Kuldeep Mallik as Satish Gupta
- Chitrapama Banerjee as Kusum Gupta
- Rohan Rai as Anuj Gupta: Kusum and Satish's son
- Sandhya Mehta as Rachel "Ritu" Gupta Vyas
- Ashmita Jaggy as Inspector Shivani Gupta
- Rishabh Shukla as Babaji/Guruji
- Suhani Dhanki as Chandni
- Arti Gupta as Dr. Kiran Chandel
- Surabhi Tiwari as Janki
- Suraj Kakkar as Dr. Anand Kumar Dixit
- Neha Marda as Bela Shastri (née Sharma)
- Pawan Mahendroo as Bhishambar Nath Sharma
- Krishanu Rathore as Praveen Shastri

== Soundtracks ==
No.	Title	Lyrics	Music	Singer(s)	Length
1.	"Malanga Re"	Raghvendra Singh	Tyson Paul	Krishna Beura	4:23
2.	"Jogiya"	Raghvendra Singh	Tyson Paul	Akanksha Sharma	7:15
3.	"Chal Sanyasi"	Raghvendra Singh	Tyson Paul	Akanksha Sharma	3:05
Total length:					14:43
