= Jhilmil Sitaaron Ka Aangan Hoga =

Indian television series

- Created by: Sooraj R. Barjatya
- Opening theme: "Jhilmil Sitaaron Ka Aangan Hoga" by Madhushree
- Country of origin: India
- Original language: Hindi
- No. of episodes: 430

Production
- Producer: Kavita K. Barjatya
- Production location: Indore
- Running time: 22 minutes
- Production company: Rajshri Productions

Original release
- Network: Sahara One
- Release: 27 February 2012 – 18 October 2013

Jhilmil Sitaaron Ka Aangan Hoga is an Indian soap opera about a poor boy, Akash, and a rich girl, Angana, who fall in love and get married. Due to family tradition, Akash is forced to be a ghar jamai, or live-in son-in-law in Angana's parents' house, and feels humiliated by it. The title relates to a popular song of the same name sung by Lata Mangeshkar and Mohammed Rafi. The show started on 27 February 2012.

== Plot ==
Kalyani Devi Raichand gets her three daughters married, and their husbands move in with her family instead of taking their wives away to their homes (which is customary in Indian society). When Kalyani and Raghuveer Raichand's youngest daughter, Angana, decides to marry Akash Sharma, Akash bids farewell to his family and becomes a ghar jamai at the Raichands' home. The young couple experiences much adversity, but Akash eventually wins respect from everyone in Angana's family, including the hard-to-please Kalyani.

Just as this conflict is resolved, tragedy strikes: Akash dies, leaving Angana shell-shocked. Soon after, the Raichands come into contact with the Chauhan family and their middle son Saumya. Saumya is a divorcé with two children; the children and Angana take a mutual liking to each other, which makes the Chauhans and the Raichands think that Angana and Saumya would be a perfect match. Under pressure from the two families, Angana and Saumya enter a loveless marriage, and Angana starts living at the Chauhan house. Within a few days, she discovers that she is pregnant with Akash's child. Saumya is shocked, but decides to stand by Angana, accepting the child as his own. But the Chauhan family learns of Angana's pregnancy. During Soumya's brother Tejas's wedding, the family discovers the truth, but they too accept the child as theirs. Love blossoms between Soumya and Angana; just then, Soumya's alcoholic ex-wife, also named Angana (also called Angie) reappears. After learning the truth, Angana brings Angie home. Angie overcomes her addiction, and Charu plots to bring her and Soumya together. However, when Soumya's friend Sameer returns from London, he and Angie fall in love and marry. After a few months, Angana gives birth to a son, Akash.

== Cast ==
- Shriya Jha / Aleeza Khan as Angana Raichand / Angana Akash Sharma / Angana Saumya Chauhan - Saumya's second wife
- Aamir Ali as Saumya Chauhan
- Sonia Singh as Angana "Angie" Sharma / Angana Saumya Chauhan
- Sudha Chandran / Kamalika Guha Thakurta as Kalyani Raghuveer Raichand
- Sonica Handa / Namrata Thapa as Chandana Raichand / Chandana Pratap Singh
- Rakesh Paul as Pratap Singh
- Monaz Mevawala as Jharna Raichand
- Sonali Nikam as Priyanka
- Naresh Suri as Vimalchand Chauhan
- Shama Ninawe as Sarita Vimalchand Chauhan
- Harsh Vashisht as Chirag Chauhan
- Karuna Pandey as Charu Chirag Chauhan
- Parth Mehrotra as Tejas Chauhan
- Rajlaxmi Solanki as Bandini
- Jitendra Trehan / Saurabh Dubey as Raghuveer Raichand
- Pankaj Singh Tiwari as Akash Sharma
- Praveen Hingonia as Sunder
- Amit Kumar Sharma as Pannu
- Yukti Kapoor as Tanu Chauhan
- Rakshanda Khan as Kkusum Sharma / Damini Dhanraj
- Sujatha Vaishnav as Akash's maternal aunt
- Neena Cheema as Mrs. Sharma: Akash's grandmother

== Music ==
In this serial, the theme song "Ek dil banaaya, phir pyar basaaya" was sung by Udit Narayan and Mahalakshmi Iyer. Other songs, "Ek dil mein mohabbat idhar bhi, chahat ki jaroorat udhar bhi" and "Ek dil toota idhar bhi, koi apna rootha udhar bhi", were sung by Udit Narayan and Sadhana Sargam. All of these songs were written by Raghvendra Singh.

== Reception ==
Kshama Rao, of The Indian Express, said:

"The show had an interesting premise of daughters staying back at their parents' home while their husbands come to them. It could have been a light-hearted, tongue-in-cheek look at the concept of ghar jamais but then we are talking Barjatyas here, for them to even endorse such a thought is sacrilege. Sigh!"

== Awards and nomination ==
Raghvendra Singh was nominated for the Indian Television Academy Awards (ITA Awards), 2013 in the "best lyrics" category.
