= Phamous =

2018 film directed by Karan Lalit Butani

- Directed by: Karan Lalit Butani
- Screenplay by: Puneet Sharma; Karan Lalit Butani
- Story by: Karan Lalit Butani
- Produced by: Raj Khatri; Amitabh Chandra; Sumit Jawadekar; Nivedita Kothare; Sarika Sanjot
- Starring: Jimmy Sheirgill; Shriya Saran; Kay Kay Menon; Pankaj Tripathi; Jackie Shroff; Mahie Gill
- Cinematography: Chetan Vohra
- Edited by: Nayan H. K. Bhadra
- Music by: Songs; Krsna Solo; Sundeep Gosswami; Surya Vishwakarma; Background Score; Akash Prajapati
- Production companies: Raj Khatri Filmz; OM Reels
- Distributed by: AA Films
- Release date: 1 June 2018
- Running time: 115 minutes
- Country: India
- Language: Hindi

Phamous (transl. Famous) is an Indian Hindi-language romantic crime film directed by Karan Lalit Butani and produced by Raj Khatri, Vidisha Productions and Amitabh Chandra. The film stars Jimmy Sheirgill, Shriya Saran, Kay Kay Menon, Pankaj Tripathi, Jackie Shroff and Mahie Gill in leading roles and was scheduled to a theatrical release in India on 1 June 2018. The Official Trailer of the movie was released on YouTube on 26 April 2018.

== Plot ==
The story of Phamous is set in the Chambal region of Madhya Pradesh with a power struggle between the four principal characters forming the crux of its story. Phamous is the fourth Indian film to be shot in the Chambal region, which is famous for its association with dacoits, the first being Mujhe Jeene Do which was shot in 1963, as well as Dacait, Bandit Queen and Paan Singh Tomar.

Shambhu (Jackie) accidentally kills his own daughter on her wedding day while saving her from being kidnapped by Kadak Singh (Kay Kay), and his actions lands him in prison. He swears vengeance.

Radhe (Jimmy) idolises gun wielding, local politician Kadak Singh and dreams of possessing a weapon of his own. Kadak is indebted to Radhe who had saved his life as a young boy.

Kadak and Ram Vijay Tripathi (Pankaj Tripathi) are bedfellows in the political game. Kadak rules the roost with crooked politicians Tripathi and his brother Babban (Jameel Khan).

Radhe has an old grudge against Tripathi as years ago, Radhe as a student was infatuated with his teacher, Rosie (Mahie Gill). Tripathi, who was high on libido, raped and murdered Rosie teacher.

Kadak Singh still manages to work with both until Tripathi sets his lecherous eyes on Radhe's wife Lalli (Shriya Saran). Radhe has to make a choice and is forced to train his guns on Tripathi. What ensues is the battle of supremacy and a revenge drama, as Shambhu is back to avenge his daughter's death. Good prevails over evil, as the self proclaimed dhaakad Phamous Raavan meets his end.

== Cast ==
- Jimmy Sheirgill as Radhe Shyam
- Shriya Saran as Lalli
- Kay Kay Menon as Kadak Singh
- Pankaj Tripathi as Ram Vijay Tripathi
- Jackie Shroff as Shambhu Singh
- Mahie Gill as Teacher Rozy
- Brijendra Kala as cop
- Jameel Khan as Babban, Tripathi's brother
- Karan Patel as Goli, local goon and Radhe's friend
- Satyadeep Mishra as Lalli's ex-boyfriend
- Padmavati Rao as Lall's mother
- Anupam Tiwari as Radhe's friend (young)

== Production ==
=== Development ===
The film was produced by Raj Khatri, Amitabh Chandra, Sunit Jawadekar and Nivedita Kothare under the banner of Vidisha Productions, Raj Khatri Filmz and OM Reels. The official trailer of the film was launched on 26 April 2018.

=== Filming ===
The shooting of the film has been done in Madhya Pradesh. The shooting of the film in Chambal has been done in Chambal Valley.

== Soundtrack ==
Phamous

Soundtrack album by Krsna Solo, Sundeep Gosswami & Surya Vishwakarma
- Released: 19 May 2018
- Genre: Feature film soundtrack
- Length: 13:14
- Language: Hindi
- Label: T-Series
External audio
- Audio Jukebox on YouTube

The soundtrack of Phamous consists of 3 songs composed by Krsna Solo, Sundeep Gosswami & Surya Vishwakarma with the lyrics being written by Puneet Sharma and Naveen Tyagi.

Tracklist
No.	Title	Lyrics	Music	Singer(s)	Length
1.	"Bandook"	Puneet Sharma	Krsna Solo	Vishal Dadlani	03:57
2.	"Dil Beparwah"	Naveen Tyagi	Sundeep Gosswami & Surya Vishwakarma	Jubin Nautiyal & Jonita Gandhi	04:46
3.	"Titri"	Puneet Sharma	Sundeep Gosswami	Priyanka Negi & Sundeep Gosswami	04:31
Total length:					13:14

== Release ==
This film was released on 1 June 2018 in India.

== Critical reception ==
The film received mixed reviews from critics; while some commentators praised the humour. Shubhra Gupta of The Indian Express gave the film 1 stars out of 5; she wrote that For lack of a better descriptor, Phamous can be said to be about men and moustaches. The kind of men who lord over the arid hillocks of the Chambal, who shower more affection on their 'mooch' than their 'mashooka'. Or should we hazard the guess that their 'mooch' is their 'mashooka'?
