= Sadhana Sargam =

Indian playback singer (born 1969)

- Sadhana in 2018

Background information
- Born: Sadhana Ghanekar; 7 March 1969 (age 57); Dabhol, Maharashtra, India
- Genres: Playback singing; Indian classical; Devotional; Pop; Ghazal; Regional Film; Folk
- Occupation: Singer
- Instrument: Vocals
- Years active: 1982–present

Sadhana Sargam (née Ghanekar, born 7 March 1969) is an Indian singer known for her playback career in Indian cinema predominantly in Hindi, Marathi, Bengali, Kannada, Nepali, Tamil and Telugu language films. She is a recipient of the National Film Award and two Filmfare Awards South. She has also won three Maharashtra State Film Awards, four Gujarat State Film Awards and one Orissa State Film Award. She has recorded songs in more than 35 languages.

== Early life ==
Sargam was born in a Marathi family of musicians at Dabhol, the seaport town in Ratnagiri District of Maharashtra. Her mother Neela Ghanekar was a classical singer and music teacher and knew arranger–composer Anil Mohile, who then arranged music for Kalyanji-Anandji. He introduced Sargam to them, and she was in the children's chorus in "Pam Pararampam, Bole Jeevan Ki Sargam" sung by Kishore Kumar in G. P. Sippy's Trishna (1978). Sargam performed at music festival Sawai Gandharva at the age of 4.

She sang the popular song Ek Anek Aur Ekta for Doordarshan at the age 6. The song was composed by Vasant Desai. Speaking about her memory of singing the song, Sargam said, "My parents took me for that recording. I don't remember much of it. It feels quite surreal when I hear it now." Sargam studied at the A. B. Goregaonkar English School in Goregaon, Mumbai.

Her mother (Ms Neela Ghanekar) was a classical singer and was MA in Music. Mother has taught her initially. Her mother made a small Tanpura to play and sing. She has a brother who is 1.5 years younger to her and used to accompany her on Tabla as and when needed.

She won a Central Government scholarship at the age 10 and this led to a 7-year learning stint under Pandit Jasraj. From childhood she was also learning and performing with Vasant Desai for his documentaries, children's films and stage shows. Desai advised her mother that Sargam was competent enough to handle both classical and light music and should remain in touch with both, as her mother wanted her to take up light singing. In fact, it was Desai who recommended that she learn under Pandit Jasraj.

== Career ==
=== 1982–1990: Early career ===
Sargam made her playback debut in Kanku Pagli, a Gujarati film. Her first Hindi song was the solo "Door Nahin Rehna" from the film Rustom. However, Rustom was delayed and was released only in 1985, and Sargam ’s first released film was Subhash Ghai's Vidhaata (1982) in which she sang the song "Saat Saheliyan" for actress Padmini Kolhapure. The song, composed by Kalyanji-Anandji, also had the voices of Kishore Kumar and Alka Yagnik.

Sargam continued to sing in films like Pighalta Aasmaan, Raj Tilak, Karishma Kudrat Ka (in which she was the only female singer), but it was only with "Har Kisiko Nahin Milta" (Janbaaz 1986) that she was noticed.

Khudgarz was followed by Khoon Bhari Maang (1988) and Sargam also began to sing for other composers like Anu Malik, R. D. Burman, Anand Milind and sparingly under Laxmikant–Pyarelal. Her main hits continued to be with Rajesh Roshan, which included "Jab Koi Baat Bigad Jaaye" from Jurm ,"Radha Bina Hai" and "Aap Ko Dekh ke" from Kishen Kanhaiya, and songs in Dariya Dil, Asmaan Se Ooncha and Jaisi Karni Waisi Bharnii. She also sung several songs in B.R. Chopra's popular television series Mahabharat (1988).

She got a boost from Tridev (Kalyanji – Anandji – Viju Shah) in 1989 in which she worked on "Main Teri Mohabbat Mein" and "Gajar Ne Kiya Hai Ishara".

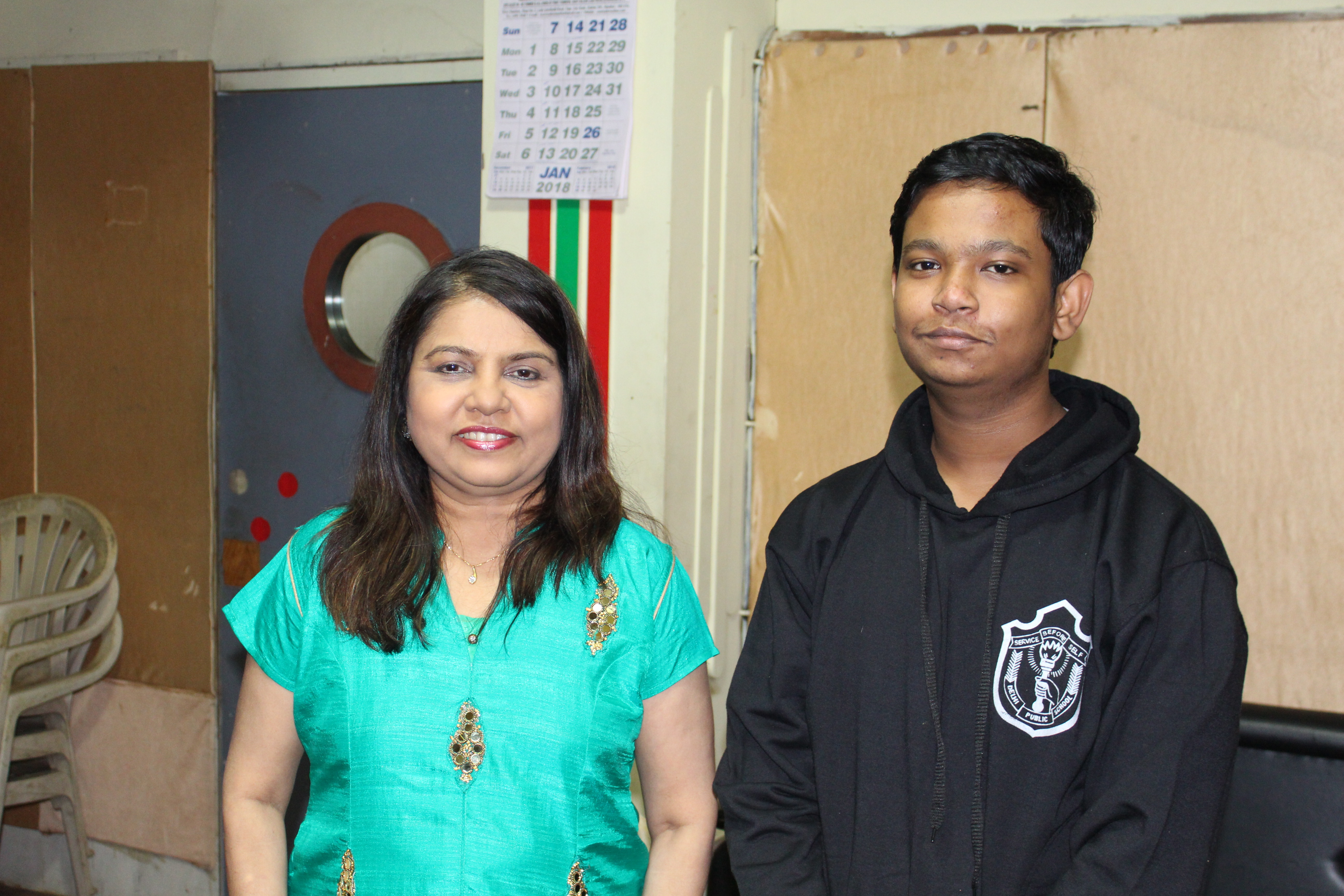
Sargam with Shourya Kumar Lal, Indian Music Composer, Director & Actor.

=== 1990–2010: Fame and migration to South Indian music industries ===
In the early 1990s, Sargam emerged as one of the most sought-after female singers, along with Kavita Krishnamurthy, Alka Yagnik, Anuradha Paudwal and Poornima. She sang for composers like Nadeem–Shravan, Anand–Milind, Anu Malik, Jatin – Lalit, Bappi Lahiri, Viju Shah and Dilip Sen – Sameer Sen.

For the 1992 film Vishwatma, she sang "Saat Samundar Paar" for debutant Divya Bharti which became a chartbuster. The same year she sang "Teri Umeed Tera Intezar", "Teri Isi Ada Pe Sanam" in Deewana and "Aashiqui Mein Har Aashiq" in Dil Ka Kya Kasoor. The songs were superhits. Sargam would have become the voice of Divya Bharti were it not for the latter's untimely demise. Also in 1992, she sang the enduring duet “Pehla Nasha” by Jatin-Lalit with Udit Narayan in the film Jo Jeeta Wohi Sikander.

Her most critically acclaimed Hindi songs from the 2000s are in the film Water, composed by A. R. Rahman, in which she sang three songs: "Aayo Re Sakhi", "Piya Ho" and "Naina Neer". Her other notable rhapsodic Hindi hits are "Neele Neele Ambar Par" from Kalakaar, "Jab Koi Baat Bigad Jaye" from Jurm, "Pyar Ke Kagaz Pe" from Jigar, "Pehla Nasha" from Jo Jeeta Wohi Sikandar, "Na Kajre Ki Dhar" from Mohra, "Tere Dar Pe Sanam" from Phir Teri Kahani Yaad Aayee, "Jhinimini" from Maqbool and "Aao Na" from Kyun! Ho Gaya Na....

Sargam has sung more than 200 songs in Tamil, almost all of them having been well received. Her hits include, but not limited to, "Vennilave" from Minsara Kanavu, "Nenje Nenje" from Ratchagan, "Snehithane" from Alai Payuthey, "Swasame" from Thenali, "Konjum Mainakkale" from Kandukondain Kandukondain, "Anbae Sugama" from Paarthale Paravasam, "Deewana Deewana" from Gemini, "Vaanaville Vaanaville" from Ramanaa, "Chanakya Chanakya" from Dum, "Manmadhane Nee" from Manmadhan, "Thaiyyatha Thaiyyatha" from Thiruttu Payale, "Akkam Pakkam" from Kireedam, Enadhuyirae from Bheemaa, "Mukundha Mukundha" from Dasavathaaram, "Om Zaarare" from Kuselan, and "Kaiya Pudi" from Mynaa.

With nearly 100 tracks to her credit in Telugu, her hits include "Vennelave" from Merupu Kalalu, "Snehithuda" from Sakhi, "Palike Gorinkaa Chudave" from Priyuralu Pilichindi, "Sathamaanaa Mannadile" from Mrugaraju, "Baba Neeku Mokkutha" from Baba, "Jaajimalli Thota" and "Kommallo Koyila" from "Ninu Chusaka Nenundalenu", "Pedave Palikina Matallone" from Naani, "Ela Vacchenamma" from Sankranti, "Manasa" from Munna, "Mooga Manase" from Nava Vasantham, "Ninnena" from Salute, "Panchirey" from Konchem Ishtam Konchem Kashtam, "Kanu Paapalloo Prema" from Shambo Shiva Shambo, "Anthapuramloo" and "Avuna Neevena" from Rudhramadevi.

Sargam won her first Star Screen award for "Chupke Se Lag Ja Gale" from Saathiya. She also won Filmfare, IIFA, Star Screen, GIFA, Apsara awards, Zee Cine Award, Star Screen Award and Stardust Best Playback Singer Female award nomination for "Aao Na" from " Kyon Ho Gaya Na..!" She received prestigious Zee Cine Award at Dubai for "Halki Halki Mulaqate Thi" from Kuch Na Kaho in 2003. She is the only playback singer from India who currently sings in 27 Indian languages. She won the National Film Award for Best Female Playback Singer for the song "Pattu Solli" from Thankar Bachan's cult classic movie Azhagi; the music was by maestro Ilaiyaraaja, whom she has praised, time and again, for "giving her such a wonderful song, and making her eligible for the National Award".

=== 2010–Recent works ===
Sargam sang several songs in Hindi and Odia for music director Kajol-Saroj. She has also sung the Tamil version of "Mann Mohana" from the Hindi film Jodhaa Akbar. Another foot-tapping recent solo Tamil song is "Sutri Varum Bhoomi" from the Vidhyasagar-composed Jeyamkondaan and "En Nenjil" from Baana Kaathadi. She also sang the track "Rara Are Tu Aaja.." for the Hindi-dubbed version of Chandramukhi in 2008. Sargam's Kannada song Marali Mareyagi from the movie Savaari in 2009 was well-received and won several accolades. The recent Ilaiyaraaja-composed Tamil film Naan Kadavul has a song titled "Amma Un Pillai" featuring her voice. In 2014, Sargam sang for A. R. Rahman in India's first-ever photorealisitc motion capture film, Kochadaiiyaan, which was lip-synced by Deepika Padukone on screen. The same year, Sargam recorded two other hit tracks, "Kannukkul Pothivaippen" in Thirumanam Enum Nikkah and "Sonnathu Sonnathu" in Aranmanai. In 2015, she sang two songs for Ilaiyaraaja in the historical drama, Rudhramadevi (soundtrack).

In 2011, Sargam made a contribution to the spiritual music world by singing an album: Mahalaxmi Mukti Samvad, MMS i.e. Mahalaxmi's Dialogues of Salvation. The lyrics are written by Dr. Pradeep Wagh. This album was released at the hands of spiritual Guru Vidyavachaspati Dr. Shankar Abhyankar.

In 2013, Sadhana Sargam sang a romantic duet with Udit Narayan, "Ek Dil Hai Toota Idhar Bhi" penned by Raghvendra Singh in the music direction of Navin Manish for Rajshri Production's TV show Jhilmil Sitaaron Ka Aangan Hoga on Sahara One channel.

In 2014, Sargam recorded a bhajan, "O Kaanha Kaa Tohe Arpan Karun" penned by Raghvendra Singh in the music direction of Navin Manish for Rajshri productions TV show Mere rang mein rangne waali on Life Ok channel.

In 2015, Sargam, along with Kumar Sanu, recorded the runaway hit track, "Dard Karaara", from Dum Laga Ke Haisha in Anu Malik music. In 2017, the duo joined once again, but to record the title track for a TV serial, Yeh Un Dinon Ki Baat Hai; the song became an instant hit.

In 2018, Sargam sang an energetic and inspiring song Houn Jau Dya in Madhuri Dixit's Marathi film debut, Bucket List. The song also has the voices of Shreya Ghosal and Shaan.

In 2019, Sargam, along with Jonita Gandhi recorded a song, "Nee Sirichalum" from the Vishal-starrer, Action. The same year to commemorate the 500th episode of the hit serial Sembaruthi, Sargam and Vijay Prakash dueted a song in the music direction of Sekar Sai Barath.

In June 2021, Sargam collaborated with A R Rahman and Gulzar to record the song "Meri Pukaar Suno." The emotionally gravid track has an ensemble of six other singers: Alka Yagnik, K.S. Chithra, Shreya Ghoshal, Shashaa Tirupati, Armaan Malik and Asees Kaur. Described as a "heartfelt song of healing" by Rolling Stone India, the video for the song, featuring all the singers, was directed by Nazeef Mohammed.

=== Bengali career ===
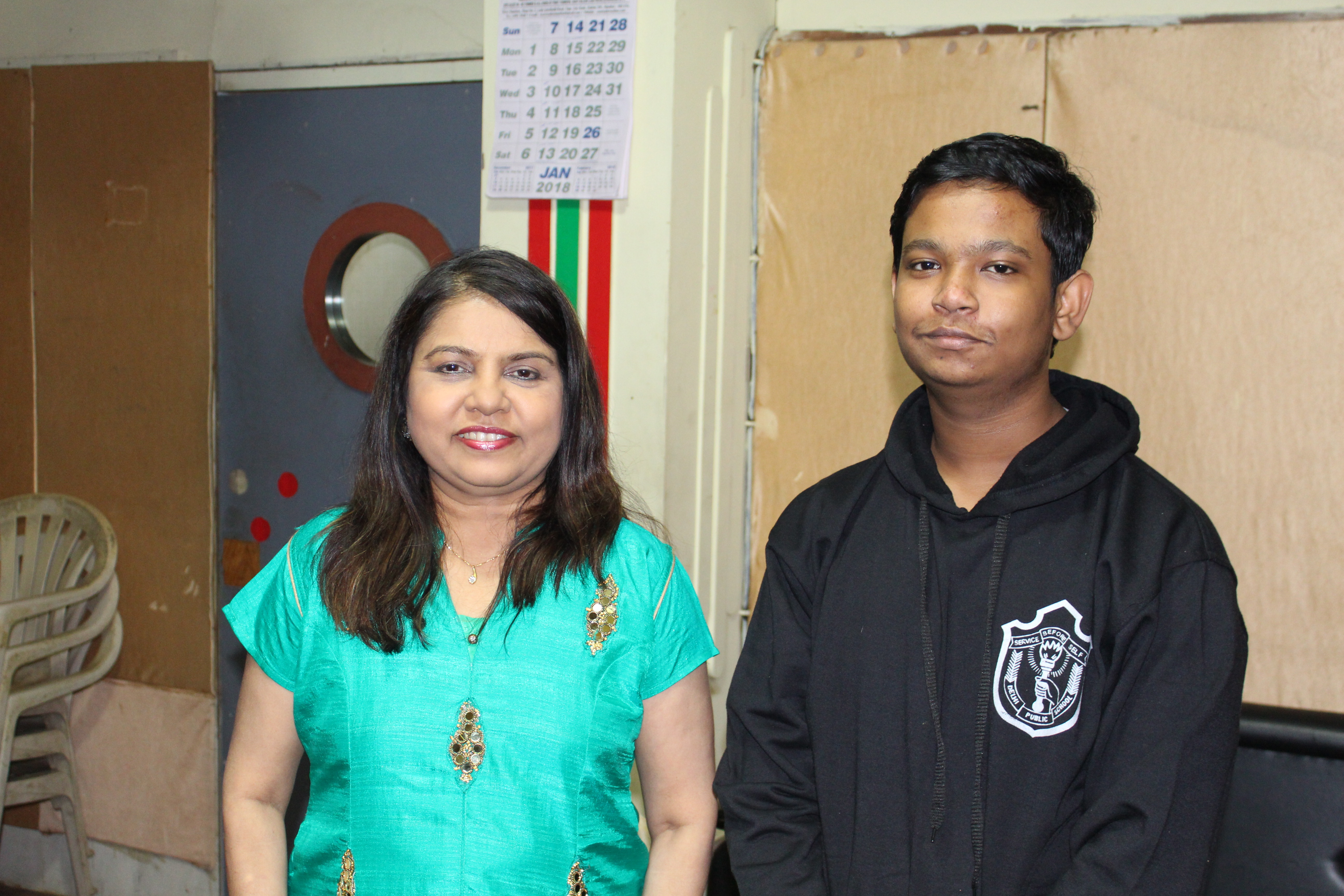
Sargam with Music composer Shourya Kumar Lal

Sargam sang her first song in the year 1992 film called Daan Pratidan, music composed by Ajoy Das. The following year Bappi Lahiri approached her to sing in the film Tomar Rakte Amar Sohag. She sang in films like Sagar Kinare, Kotha Chilo, Phiriye Dao and Dhushar Godhuli. She has sung the song "Holo Dhonno Jibon" along with Sonu Nigam in the film Bandhan (2004) which has been remade in Hindi as superhit "Hum Mar Jaayenge", sung by Arijit Singh and Tulsi Kumar. Further, she also sang "Akashe Batase Chal Sathi Ure Jai" with Kavita Krishnamurthy in Moner Majhe Tumi (2003), but the film's title track, her duet with Udit Narayan, "Premi O Premi" became an enormous hit.

== Legacy ==
Beginning her career in the early 1980s, Sargam has sung over 15,000 film and non-film songs in 36 Indian languages including Hindi, Marathi, Tamil, Bengali, Telugu, Assamese, Gujarati, Nepali, Meitei, Odia, Kannada, Malayalam and many others. In 2002, she became the first non-South Indian singer to win the National Award for a South Indian song. She is also the first non-South Indian singer to receive two Filmfare South Awards in the same year.

She is the only playback singer who actively participates and sings devotional and meditation songs for spiritual foundations like Prajapita Brahmakumaris Ishwariya Vishwa Vidyalaya and Satya Saibaba. Her 2015 bhajan Sai Ram Sai Shyam Sai Bhagwan has crossed more than 100 million views on YouTube, and is immensely popular throughout India. Sargam has recorded hundreds of devotional albums in various languages, especially in Hindi, Gujarati, and Bengali.

Having achieved all prestigious awards in India, she is surprisingly yet to receive a Filmfare Award. In fact, she has neither won a Filmfare nor National Award for a Hindi song. Though she has numerous tracks to her credit (more than 2000 songs in Hindi alone), she had only been nominated twice for Filmfare Awards; once in 1989, for Main Teri Hoon Janam and sixteen years later, in 2005, for Aao Na. Coincidentally, her contemporary, Alka Yagnik bagged the coveted trophies, both times.

Sargam's work in the international films Earth (1998 film) and Water are not happenstance, explains Deepa Mehta, the films' director. Mehta says, "I'm not fond of high pitched Indian women's voices. So there's this wonderful singer Sadhana Sargam, whose voice is low and we used her voice." On her frequent collaborations with Sargam, Rahman says, "I am surprised every time I work with her." Her other notable international collaboration was with Bally Sagoo, with whom she recorded Sometimes, Sometimes, a remixed version of the well known Kabhie Kabhie Mere Dil.

Sargam's voice is widely acclaimed among her fellow artists like Lata Mangeshkar, Asha Bhosle, K.S.Chithra, Sunidhi Chauhan A R Rahman, Ilaiyaraaja, Amitabh Bachchan and Shashaa Tirupati.

== Awards and nominations ==
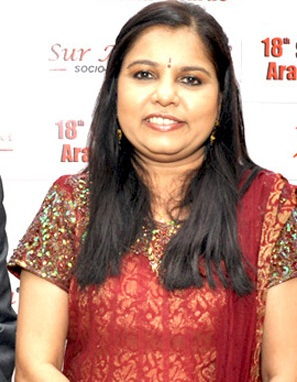
Sargam won Filmfare Award for Best Female Playback Singer – Tamil & Telugu in the same year.

National Film Awards

- 2002 – National Film Award for Best Female Playback Singer – "Paattu Cholli" (Azhagi), Tamil film.

Filmfare Awards

- 1988 – Nominated – Filmfare Award for Best Female Playback Singer – "Main Teri Hu Janam" ("Khoon Bhari Maang ")
- 2000 – Nominated – Filmfare Award for Best Female Playback Singer – Tamil – "Snehidhane" ("Alai Payuthey")
- 2001 – Nominated – Filmfare Award for Best Female Playback Singer – Tamil – "Swasame" ("Thenali")
- 2002 – Nominated – Filmfare Award for Best Female Playback Singer – Tamil – "Kadhal Vandhadhum" ("Poovellam Un Vaasam")
- 2002 – Nominated – Filmfare Award for Best Female Playback Singer – Tamil – "Paattu Cholli" ("Azhagi")
- 2004 – Nominated – Filmfare Award for Best Female Playback Singer – "Aao Na" ("Kyun! Ho Gaya Na...")
- 2007 – Winner – Best Female Playback Singer (Tamil) – "Akkam Pakkam" (Kireedam)
- 2007 – Winner – Filmfare Award for Best Female Playback Singer – Telugu – "Manasa" (Munna)
- 2008 – Nominated – Filmfare Award for Best Female Playback Singer – Tamil – "Mukundha Mukundha" ("Dasavathaaram")
- 2008 – Nominated – Filmfare Award for Best Female Playback Singer – Telugu – "Ninnena" ("Salute")
- 2009 – Nominated – Filmfare Award for Best Female Playback Singer – Kannada – "Mareli Mareyagi" ("Savaari")

Zee Cine Awards

- 2004 – Zee Cine Award for Best Playback Singer – Female – "Kuch Naa Kaho" (Kuch Naa Kaho)

Maharashtra State Film Awards

- 2000 – State Award for Best Singer – Female – "Kshitijavaril Tara" (Jodidar)
- 2002 – State Award for Best Singer – Female – Aadhar
- 2005 – State Award for Best Singer – Female – "Saanjh Jhali Tari" (Sarivar Sari)

Orissa State Film Awards

- 1994 – Best Playback Singer (Female) – Sagar Ganga

Zee Gaurav Puraskar

- 2000 – Award for Best Female Singer – Jodidar
- 2002 – Award for Best Female Singer – Aadhar
- 2004 – Award for Best Female Singer – Ek Hoti Wadi
- 2005 – Award for Best Female Singer – Sarivar Sari
- 2006 – Award for Best Female Singer – Aaishappath
- 2007 – Award for Best Female Singer – Aevdhasa Aabhal

Star Screen Awards

- 2003 – Star Screen Award for Best Female Playback – "Chupke Se" (Saathiya)

Uninor South Radio Mirchi Awards

- 2009 – Song of the Year – "Marali Mareyaagi" (Savaari; along with Composer Manikanth Kadri)
- 2009 – Best Kannada Song Listener's Choice – "Marali Mareeyaagi" (Savaari)

=== Other awards and recognitions ===
- 'Lata Mangeshkar Award' from the Government of Madhya Pradesh.
- Konkan Sahyadri Swar Ratna Award for Invaluable contribution in Indian Music
- 2000 – Dinakaran Award for Best Female Singer – "Snegithane" (Alai Payuthey)
- 2002 – Dinakaran Award for Best Female Singer – "Paattu Cholli" (Azhagi)
- 2004 – Kalakar Award for Best Female Playback
- 2005 – Vitusco Award for Best Female singer – "Oru Vaarthai" (Ayya)
- 2005 & 2008 – Bhojpuri Film Award for Best Singer – Female
- 2005, 2006 & 2007 – Sanskruthi Kaladarpan Awards
- 2006 – Gujarath State Film Award for Best Singer – Female
- 2008 – Chitrapathi V. Shantaram Award for Best Female singer – "Tu Aevdhasa Aabhal" (Aevdhasa Aabhal)
- Asha Bhosle award in 2007
- Mohammad Rafi award from Madhya Pradesh in 2012
- Madan Mohan Purashkar
- Sur Sringaar award in 2009
- Lifetime achievement sarangi award from Nepali Music Industry for her contribution as a lead singer
