= Aleeza Khan =

Indian television actress

- Born: 9 August 1987 (age 38); Mumbai, Maharashtra, India
- Occupation: Actress
- Years active: 2004–present

Aleeza Khan is an Indian actress, known for Ghar Ki Lakshmi Betiyann (2006) and C.I.D. (1998). She was almost finalised to play Nikhat in Qubool Hai but was replaced by Archana Taide.

Aleeza's first notable role in television was in Ghar Ki Lakshmi Betiyann on Zee TV as Gauri Garodia, one of the Garodia sisters. Her first movie was Chand Bujh Gaya. Her other notable roles were Angana in Jhilmil Sitaaron Ka Aangan Hoga and Amrita in Pyaar Ka Dard Hai Meetha Meetha Pyaara Pyaara.

Recently, she was seen in Maddam Sir where she played multiple roles, such as Pinky, Aparna Bhansal, Zeenat and Charulata in different episodes.

== Television ==
Year	Serial	Role	Channel
2004–2005	Kesar	Neha	Star Plus
2005–2006	Karan – The Detective	Monika (Detective Karan's Assistant)	DD National
2007–2009	Ghar Ki Lakshmi Betiyann	Gauri Garodia / Gauri Akash Shah	Zee TV
2011	Love U Zindagi	Roop Dhillon	Star Plus
2012	Fear Files: Darr Ki Sacchi Tasvirein		Zee TV
2013	Jhilmil Sitaaron Ka Aangan Hoga	Angana Saumya Chauhan	Sahara One
2014	Pyaar Ka Dard Hai Meetha Meetha Pyaara Pyaara	Amrita Vikram Dhanrajgir	Star Plus
2023	Pyar Ka Pehla Naam: Radha Mohan	Advocate Devika Sahay	Zee TV
