= Kahani Rubberband Ki =

- Directed by: Sarika Sanjot
- Written by: Sarika Sanjot
- Story by: Sarika Sanjot
- Produced by: Sarika Sanjot
- Starring: Pratik Gandhi; Avika Gor; Manish Raisinghan; Gaurav Gera
- Edited by: Sanjay Sankla
- Music by: Meet Bros; Anup Bhat
- Release date: 14 October 2022
- Country: India
- Language: Hindi

Kahani Rubberband Ki is a 2022 Indian Hindi-language drama film written, directed and produced by Sarika Sanjot. and Co-produced by Naresh Dudani. It stars Pratik Gandhi, Avika Gor, Manish Raisinghan and Gaurav Gera.

== Plot ==
Kahani Rubberband Ki tells the story of a young, beautiful couple from different communities who live together in the state of Uttar Pradesh. After an unplanned pregnancy caused by a protection malfunction, all of their dreams are shattered. In order to protect his relationship with Kavya and raise public awareness, he accepts responsibility and files a complaint against the Condom manufacturer.

== Cast ==
- Pratik Gandhi as Narendra Tripathi aka Nanno
- Avika Gor
- Manish Raisinghan
- Gaurav Gera
- Rajesh Jais
- Hemang Dave
- Aruna Irani
- Kanwarjit Paintal
- Amit Singh Thakur
- Meenakshi Sethi
- Romil Chaudhary
- Shyam Lal

== Soundtrack ==
Kahani Rubberband Ki

Soundtrack album by Meet Bros, Kunal Ganjawala, Altamash Faridi, Anup Bhat
- Released: 6 October 2022
- Genre: Feature film soundtrack
- Length: 11:07
- Language: Hindi
- Label: Zee Music Company

Official audio
- Kahani Rubberband Ki- Full Album on YouTube

The music of the film is composed by Meet Bros, Anup Bhat while the lyrics written by Thaakur.

Track listing
No.	Title	Lyrics	Music	Singer(s)	Length
1.	"Chomu"	Thaakur	Anup Bhat	Kunal Ganjawala, Hargun Kaur	4:11
2.	"Ho Sake Toh"	Thaakur	Meet Bros	Meet Bros, Altamash Faridi	4:31
3.	"Fatichar"	Thaakur	Anup Bhat	Geet Sagar, Mridul Ghosh	4:44
Total length:					11:07
