= Shweta Sinha =

- Occupation: Actress

Shweta Sinha is an Indian television actress best known for her portrayal of Pari Bhardwaj in Colors TV's soap opera Sasural Simar Ka. She hails from Nagpur, Maharashtra, India.

== Television ==
Year	Name	Role
2011–2018	Sasural Simar Ka	Pari Sachdeva Bhardwaj
2019	Shakti	Rekha Bansal
2021	Kyun Utthe Dil Chhod Aaye	Bindu Mohan Pratapsingh
