= Sarika Sanjot =

Indian film director writer and film producer

- Born: Ghaziabad, Uttar Pradesh, India
- Occupations: Film producer, director, writer
- Years active: 2017–present

Sarika Sanjot is an Indian film producer, director and writer who works in Hindi cinema. She was the director and writer of films Kahani Rubberband Ki (2022) and Producer Of GST-Galti Sirf Tumhari (2017),Phamous (2018), Family of Thakurganj (2019) and Kahani Rubberband Ki (2022).

== Filmography ==
=== Producer ===
Year	Title	Notes	Ref.
2017	GST-Galti Sirf Tumhari		
2018	Phamous		
2019	Family of Thakurganj		
2022	Kahani Rubberband Ki		

=== Director ===
Year	Title	Notes	Ref.
2022	Kahani Rubberband Ki		

=== Writer ===
Year	Title	Notes	Ref.
2022	Kahani Rubberband Ki		
