= Raghvendra Singh =

Indian lyricist

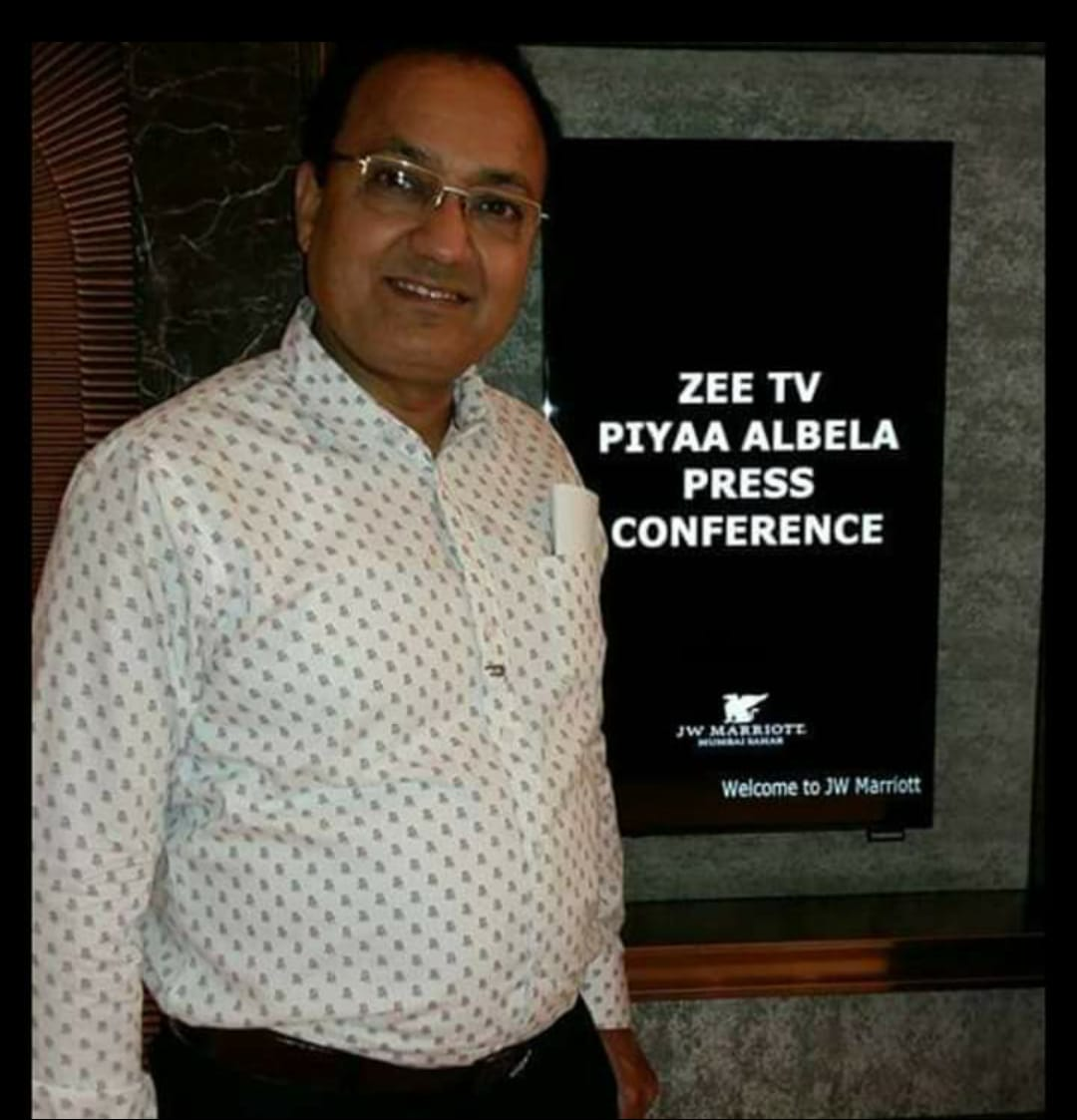
- Raghvendra Singh at Zee TV Press Conference
- Born: 30 August 1966 (age 60); Dhandhupura, TajGanj, Agra, Uttar Pradesh, India
- Occupations: Lyricist, screenwriter, director
- Years active: 1994–present
- Parent(s): N. S. Verma , writer - director, first batch Film and Television Institute of India Pune,

Raghvendra Singh (born 31 August 1966) is an Indian lyricist, writer and film director. He has penned lyrics for forthcoming web show Sangemarmar created by Rajshri Productions , will stream on JioCinema . He has penned lyrics in popular serials including Dadi Amma Dadi Amma Maan Jaao, Piyaa Albela, Ek Shringaar Swabhimaan, Mere Rang Mein Rangne Waali, Jhilmil Sitaaron Ka Aangan Hoga, and Suron Ka Kaarwan on ATN channel in 1997. He also penned lyrics in a feature film Jaydev starring Jeetendra.

Songs including "Jogiya", "Malanga", "O Kanha", "Rab ne kaisa khel rachaaya", "Teej aayi hariyaali" and "Tu pyar hai Tu hi Tabahi" got recognition. Well-known singers who rendered their voices to his lyrics include Udit Narayan, Sadhana Sargam, Vinod Rathod, Shaan, Mahalakshmi Iyer, Harshdeep Kaur, Palak Muchhal, Krishna Beaura, Richa Sharma, Anweshaa , Pamela Jain Udbhav Ojha,| Raj Burman, Aditi Paul, and Aakanksha Sharma.

He was one of the story writers of Vivah, and contributed as a chief assistant director in this feature film.

He was a creative writer in many TV series including Woh Rahne Waali Mahlon Ki, Main Teri Parchayin Hoon, Do Hanson Ka Jodaa, Yahan main ghar ghar kheli, Jhilmil Sitaaron Ka Aangan Hogaa, Mere rang mein rangne waali, Ek shringaar Swabhimaan and Piya Albela.

He started his career as an assistant director with director Sooraj R. Barjatya in Hum Saath Saath Hain.

== Early and personal life ==
Singh's native place Dhandhupura is situated 2 km from the Taj Mahal in Agra. He worked with his father Narendra Singh Verma in the documentary Visit India Discover Agra as a chief assistant director in 1985. His father passed out from Film And Television Institute, Pune in 1st batch of direction and screenplay writing in 1964. At that time, Shatrughn Sinha, Subhash Ghai, Firoz Chinoy, P. Kumar Vasudev were his father's batchmates in film institute.

Minister in Uttar-pradesh government Chaudhary Udai Bhan Singh is his uncle . His great grand father Babu Pyare Lal fought first Member of Legislative Assambly election in Agra with Bhartiya Jan Sangh party in 1951. Babu Pyare Lal Ka Nagla one km away from Taj Mahal, this residential area name was kept in respect of his great grand father who was close friend of Yug Purush & former Prime Minister Atal Bihari Vajpayee.

After graduation, he completed LL.B from Agra College, Agra in 1989.

Singh came to Mumbai in 1991, and joined Dalal Street Investment Journal, a share market magazine as a correspondent.

His first song Khilta Huaa Gulab Kahun was recorded on 1994 for a feature film JAYDEV released in 2001 starring Jeetendra at Film Centre.

== Discography ==
=== Award functions ===
His songs "Jogiya" and "MalangaRe" were performed in Zee Rishtey Awards Awards in 2017.

=== As a lyricist ===
Year	Film	Music composer	Singer	Ref.
2001	Jaydev	Kishor Sharma	Udit Narayan	https://www.imdb.com/title/tt2567820/

Year	Serial	Music composer	Singer	Channel	Ref.
1997	Suron Ka Karwaan	Udbhav Ojha	Udbhav Ojha	ATN	
2012	Jhilmil Sitaaron Ka Aangan Hoga	Navin Manish	Udit Narayan, Sadhana Sargam, Mahalakshmi Iyer	Sahara One	
2015	Mere Rang Mein Rangne Waali	Navin Manish, Akash Vihaan	Shaan, Palak Muchhal, Richa Sharma, Vinod Rathod, Dev Negi	Life OK, Hotstar	
2016	Ek Shringaar-Swabhiman	Udbhav Dony	Harshdeep Kaur, Pamela Jain, Udbhav Ojha	Colors TV, Voot	
2017	Piyaa Albela	Tyson Paul	Krishna Beura, Aakansha Sharma	Zee TV, ZEE5, Big Ganga	
2020	Dadi Amma... Dadi Amma Maan Jaao!	Udbhav Ojha	Udbhav Ojha, Krishna Beura, Aakansha Sharma	Star Plus, Hotstar	

Year	Web show	Music composer	Singer	Channel	Ref.
2024	Sangamarmar!	Tyson Paul	Harshdeep Kaur, Anveshaa, Raj Burman	JioCinema	

=== Music videos ===
Year	Song	Music composer	Singer	Ref.
2018	"Dil Boley Shukriyaa"	Parikshit Sharma	Aditi Paul	
2020	"Kinna Kinna Sona Sona"	Vishal Bharat	Rani Indrani Sharma	https://m.youtube.com/watch?v=McJnrkGlIzg , https://www.newsnationtv.com/entertainment/bollywood/punjabi-song-kinna-kinna-sona-sona-sung-by-rani-indrani-sharma-written-by-raghvendra-singh-171795.html

== Filmography/serials ==
=== As a story writer (story inputs) and chief assistant director ===
Year	Film	Director	Ref.
2006	Vivah	Sooraj Barjatya	Vivah

=== As a creative writer ===
Year	Serial	Channel	Ref.
2005	Woh Rehne Waali Mehlon Ki	Sahara One	
2008	Main Teri Parchhain Hoon	NDTV Imagine	
2009	Yahan Main Ghar Ghar Kheli	Zee TV, Zee5	
2010	Do Hanson Ka Jodaa	NDTV Imagine	
2012	Jhilmil Sitaaron Ka Aangan Hoga	Sahara One	
2012	Pyaar Ka Dard Hai Meetha Meetha Pyaara Pyaara	Star Plus, Hotstar	
2015	Mere Rang Mein Rangne Waali	Life OK, Hotstar	
2016	Ek Shringaar-Swabhiman	Colors TV, Voot	
2017	Piyaa Albela	Zee TV, ZEE5, Big Ganga	

=== As a chief assistant director ===
Year	Film	Director	Artist	Ref.
2006	Vivah	Sooraj Barjatya	Shahid Kapoor, Amrita Rao	

Year	Documentary	Director	Ref.
1985	Visit India Discover Agra	Narendra Singh Verma	

=== As an assistant director ===
Year	Film	Director	Star Cast	Ref.
1999	Hum Saath-Saath Hain	Sooraj Barjatya	Salman Khan, Mohnish Behl, Saif Ali Khan, Karishma Kapoor, Sonali Bendre, Tabu, Neelam Kothari	

== Awards and nominations ==
Year	Award ceremony	Serial	Category	Result	Note
2013	Indian Television Academy Awards	Jhilmil Sitaaron Ka Aangan Hoga	For Best Lyricist	Nominated	
2017	Indian Television Academy Awards	Ek Shringaar-Swabhiman	For Best Lyricist	Nominated	
