= Lajwanti (TV series) =

- Genre: Historical period drama
- Based on: Lajwanti, Land of five rivers by Rajinder Singh Bedi
- Written by: Rajinder Singh Bedi
- Screenplay by: Ila Bedi Dutta
- Story by: Ila Bedi Dutta
- Directed by: Ravind Gautam & Ravindar Singh Suri
- Creative directors: Shafali Lall and Indrajeet Mukharjee
- Starring: see below
- Theme music composer: Som Dasgupta
- Country of origin: India
- Original languages: Hindi; Punjabi; Urdu
- No. of seasons: 1
- No. of episodes: 95

Production
- Producers: Rohit Vaid; Ila Bedi Dutta; Rajat Bedi
- Production locations: Mumbai; Kashmir; Patiala
- Editor: K. Rajgopal Sanjay das
- Camera setup: Multi-camera
- Running time: Approx. 22 minutes
- Production company: Trilogy Media

Original release
- Network: Zee TV
- Release: 28 September 2015 – 5 February 2016

Lajwanti is an Indian television drama show, which premiered on 28 September 2015 on Zee TV. The story is loosely based on Rajinder Singh Bedi's 1956 book titled Lajwanti, Land of five rivers and is set during Partition of India. The show was produced by Trilogy Media. The show is about the relationship between Sunderlal Bharadwaj and Lajwanti (Lajo) living in Badami Bagh Lahore. Sunderlal first time meet on well when he went to Rohranwala Village to attend Marriage Ceremony of his friend Lalchand Baniya. They face many perils throughout the course of their relationship. The series ended on 5 February 2016, where Sunder, who had previously lost his memory and wandered away, reunites with Lajo, and is stopped from marrying Gunwanti. Lajo and Sunder proceed to get married again, jubilantly ending the show.

== Cast ==
- Ankitta Sharma as Lajwanti Kaur Bhardwaj / Fareb Jaan in Peshawar / Aeisha Begum/ Adaa Jaan in Heera Mandi.
- Sid Makkar as Sunderlal Bharadwaj
- Rohit Khurana as Jamal Peshawari
- Sonam Bisht as Dulari Bharadwaj/ Wafa Jaan in Heera Mandi
- Nisha Nagpal as Gunwanti
- Deepali Pansare as Nooran Bibi
- Suraj Kakkar as Chaman Kishan Lal Bharadwaj
- Shiny Dixit as Indumati
- Andy von Eich as Officer Eric Burns
- Viraj Kapoor as Iqbal
- Alexander (Sasha) Dolbenko as Officer Preston
- Vidur Anand as Lalchand
- Pankaj Pareek as Safaraz Alam
- Niilam Paanchal as Shakunta Kishan Lal Bharadwaj
- Vishal Ganatra as Amrish Bharadwaj
- Harsh Singh as Kishan Lal Bharadwaj
- Aakash Pandey as Anwar
- Razia Sukhbir as Virmati Kishori Lal Bharadwaj
