= Ghar Ki Lakshmi Betiyann =

Indian television series

- Created by: Creative Eye Limited
- Directed by: Rajan Shahi; Romesh Kalra; Sunand Kumar Baranwal; Santosh Bhatt
- Starring: Kshitee Jog; Aleeza Khan; Smriti Mohan; Gunjan Walia; Soni Singh
- Music by: Abhijeet Hegdepatil KK
- Opening theme: "Ghar Ki Lakshmi Betiyann"
- Country of origin: India
- Original language: Hindi
- No. of seasons: 1
- No. of episodes: 595

Production
- Producers: Dheeraj Kumar; Zuby Kochhar
- Production location: Mumbai
- Editor: Sameer Gandhi
- Running time: approximately 23 minutes
- Production company: Creative Eye Limited

Original release
- Network: Zee TV
- Release: September 25, 2006 – August 27, 2009

Ghar Ki Lakshmi Betiyann (The wealth of the house - daughters) (also known as Betiyann) (International Title: Destiny) is a Hindi language television drama-series that aired on Zee TV. It premiered on 25 September 2006 and was directed by, Rajan Shahi. Show ended on 27 August 2009. Show was produced under the banner of Creative Eye Ltd.

== Other versions/telecasts ==
An Arabic dubbed-version premiered on Zee Aflam under the name "Al Banat Zinat Al Bayt" - girls are the beauty of the house/"البنات زينة البيت", the second season aired on 16 April 2014.

The Show was dubbed In English and aired on Zee World on DSTv channel number 166.

The Show was dubbed In French and aired on Zee Magic on Canal Sat channel number 51.

The Show was dubbed In Indonesian and aired on Zee Bioskop on MNC Vision channel number 23.

== Summary ==
Suryakant Garodia is married to Savitri and has four daughters named Saraswati, Gauri, Durga, and Lakshmi. He is adamant about having a son who will continue the family's dynasty and inherit the Garodia wealth. As Savitri's body cannot bear another pregnancy, Suryakant marries Menka, who gives birth to Yuvraj. Suryakant abandons and neglects his daughters and Savitri while spoiling Yuvraj, who grows up insolent and arrogant.

Menka wishes to have sole rights to the household and wealth, so she seeks to get rid of her stepdaughters as soon as possible by arranging marriages for them. She orchestrates Saraswati's marriage to Bhavishya Kapadia, a mentally ill and abusive man. However, Saraswati's childhood lover, Kshitij, saves her when Bhavishya attempts to set her on fire. After a lengthy trial, the sisters win the case. Saraswati, having avenged Bhavishya's actions and revealed the truth, becomes pregnant and eventually marries Kshitij.

The youngest and liveliest Lakshmi is to wed Satyakam, who also helps find clues against Bhavishya, but he dies, leaving her in a state of shock. She later meets Karan, who has come to the Garodia's to avenge his mother, who was harassed by Menka's brother Rasik. She marries him, but later realises his real intentions of revenge. She insists on her father's innocence to no avail. Karan completes his revenge, leaving Suryakant in mental shock and he disappears by falling down a mountain. The family believes Suryakant to be dead. Lakshmi begins to hate Karan as he did not pay heed to her when she begged him not to avenge her father. Realising his mistakes, Karan sets out on a quest to find Suryakant alive. He then remarries Lakshmi after she forgives him, but also dies thereafter due to acknowledging a family secret which, when exposed, brings shockwaves to the Garodia family.

Soon, this secret is revealed: Menka deceived the family and actually gave birth to a daughter instead of a son many years before, whom she exchanged with Rasik's son. The family try to find Menka's long-lost daughter, Jhumki, only to find that she has been sold to a brothel in Mumbai and is one of the most sought out prostitutes. Jhumki soon begins mingling with the family after many challenges. She also faces her own hurdles in love and marriage due to her past. Her first encounter is unsuccessful, but she soon meets Nikhil.

On the other hand, Yuvraj is trapped by a prostitute, Kajri, whom he disguises as a decent woman named Pavitra, to fool his family and marries her. He is greedy and rebukes his mother, Menka. The sisters discover his secret, and Suryakant disowns Yuvraj. However, he is eventually accepted back into the family, but he devises a plan with Kajri to take all the family wealth. The property is now in his name, and he throws everyone out of Garodia Niwas, living there peacefully with Kajri and the brothel owner, Rasili Bai. The daughters fight back to reclaim the property for their father. Eventually, Suryakant pays the price for Yuvraj's mistakes through his demise. Kajri begins to blackmail Yuvraj, controlling all the family wealth while enslaving the family. Yuvraj regrets his actions and eventually reconciles with his family, marries Niyati, and takes down Kajri.

As the show ends, Gauri is married to Akash Shah. Durga marries Bhavishya's lookalike Ranbir Dhawan, and Saraswati reluctantly accepts the alliance. Lakshmi marries Rohan, a mentally disturbed man with a brutal history of violence who is later cured in Australia. Jhumki, who changed her name to Jhanvi, marries Nikhil and moves to her husband's home, facing patriarchal trouble and female oppression at her in-laws, which is eventually overcome with the daughters proving they are equal to men.

== Cast ==
- Yatin Karyekar as Suryakant Garodia – Gayatri's son; Halki and Phulki's brother; Savitri and Menka's husband; Saraswati, Gauri, Durga, Lakshmi and Jhanvi's father; Yuvraj's adoptive father; Kiran and Suhani's grandfather; Naman and Pratiksha's adoptive grandfather (Dead)
- Aishwarya Narkar as Savitri Garodia – Chanchal's sister; Suryakant's first widow; Saraswati, Gauri, Durga and Lakshmi's mother; Jhanvi's step-mother; Yuvraj's adoptive step-mother; Kiran and Suhani's grandmother; Naman and Pratiksha's adoptive step-grandmother
- Tanushree Kaushal as Menka Garodia – Rasik's sister; Suryakant's second widow; Jhanvi's mother; Saraswati, Gauri, Durga and Lakshmi's step-mother; Yuvraj's adoptive mother; Jhanvi's mother; Naman and Pratiksha's adoptive grandmother; Kiran and Suhani's step-grandmother
- Kshitee Jog as Saraswati Garodia Gandhi – Suryakant and Savitri's eldest daughter; Menka's step-daughter; Gauri, Durga, and Lakshmi's sister; Jhanvi's half-sister; Yuvraj's adopted sister; Jhanvi's half-sister; Bhavishaya's ex-wife; Kshitij's wife; Kiran's mother
- Vikrant Rai / Hemant Thatte as Kshitij Gandhi – Puneet's brother; Saraswati's second husband; Kiran's step-father
- Neetha Shetty / Aleeza Khan as Gauri Garodia Shah – Suryakant and Savitri's second daughter; Menka's step-daughter; Saraswati, Durga and Lakshmi's sister; Jhanvi's half-sister; Yuvraj's adopted sister; Akash's wife
- Jatin Shah as Akash Shah – Devyani's son; Gauri's husband
- Smriti Mohan as Durga Garodia Dhawan – Suryakant and Savitri's third daughter; Menka's step-daughter; Saraswati, Gauri and Lakshmi's sister; Jhanvi's half-sister; Yuvraj's adopted sister; Ranveer's wife
- Kartik Sabharwal as
  - Bhavishya Kapadia – Nekchand and Dhara's elder son; Satyakam's brother; Saraswati's ex-husband; Kiran's father (Dead)
  - Ranveer Dhawan – Bhavishya's lookalike; Niyati's best friend; Durga's husband
- Twinkle Bajpai / Gunjan Walia as Lakshmi Garodia Sharma – Suryakant and Savitri's youngest daughter; Menka's step-daughter; Saraswati, Gauri and Durga's sister; Jhanvi's half-sister; Yuvraj's adopted sister; Satyakam's ex-fiancée; Karan's widow; Rohan's wife; Suhani's mother
- Gaurav Bajpai as Rohan Sharma – Lakshmi's second husband; Suhani's step-father
- Yuvraj Malhotra as Karan Mathur – Raman's elder son; Kavita and Rahul's brother; Lakshmi's first husband; Suhani's father (Dead)
- Soni Singh as Jhumki "Jhanvi" Garodia Singhania – A former prostitute; Suryakant and Menka's daughter; Savitri's step-daughter; Saraswati, Gauri, Durga and Lakshmi's half-sister; Yuvraj's adopted sister; Nikhil's wife
- Karan Hukku as Nikhil Singhania – Suraj Pratap's elder son; Jhanvi's husband
- Romit Raj as Yuvraj Garodia – Rasik's son; Suryakant and Menka's adopted son; Savitri's adopted step-son; Saraswati, Gauri, Durga, Lakshmi and Jhanvi's adopted brother; Karan's brother; Kajri's ex-husband; Niyati's husband; Naman and Pratiksha's father
- Niyati Joshi as Niyati Garodia – Ranveer's best friend; Yuvraj's second wife; Pratiksha's mother; Naman's step-mother
- Rohini Hattangadi / Nayan Bhatt as Gayatri "Baa" Garodia – Suryakant, Halki and Phulki's mother; Saraswati, Gauri, Durga, Lakshmi and Jhanvi's grandmother; Yuvraj's adoptive grandmother; Kiran and Suhani's great-grandmother; Naman and Pratiksha's adoptive great-grandmother
- Nupur Alankar as Halki Garodia – Gayatri's elder daughter; Phulki and Suryakant's sister; Hasmukh's wife
- Suchitra Bandekar as Phulki Garodia – Gayatri's younger daughter; Suryakant and Halki's sister
- Shekhar Shukla as Hasmukh – Naina's son; Halki's husband
- Manini Mishra as Chanchal – Savitri's sister; Saraswati, Gauri, Durga and Lakshmi's aunt
- Rajendra Chawla as Rasik – Menaka's brother; Yuvraj's father; Naman and Pratiksha's grandfather; Raman and Karan's murderer
- Jasveer Kaur as Kajri Rani aka Pavira – A prostitute; Yuvraj's ex-wife; Naman's mother
- Yuvraj Mehra as Puneet Gandhi – Kshitij's brother
- Akansha as Kavita Mathur – Raman's daughter; Karan and Rahul's sister
- Shishir Sharma / Sai Ballal as Nekchand Kapadia – Dhara's husband; Bhavishya and Satyakam's father; Kiran's grandfather
- Natasha Rana as Dhara Kapadia – Nekchand's wife; Bhavishya and Satyakam's mother; Kiran's grandmother
- Sid Makkar as Satyakam Kapadia – Nekchand and Dhara's younger son; Bhavishya's brother; Lakshmi's ex-fiancé (Dead)
- Gulfam Khan as Rasili – Head and owner of the brothel
- Chhavi Mittal as Preeti – Bhavishya's ex-lover (Dead)
- Amit Dolawat as Prince / Dev – Garodias' family friend
- Narayani Shastri as Advocate Damini Verma – Mrs. Verma's daughter; Saraswati's lawyer; Kapil's ex-wife
- Gaurav Chopra as Advocate Kapil Singhania – Damini's ex-husband
- Alka Ashlesha as Mrs. Verma – Damini's mother
- Mahru Sheikh as Devyani Shah – Akash's mother
- Nimai Bali as Suraj Pratap Singh – Nikhil's father
- Sulabha Arya as Naina – Hasmukh's mother
- Yash Pandit as Prakash
