= Ek Shringaar – Swabhiman =

- Genre: Drama; Family drama Romance
- Created by: Sooraj Barjatya
- Screenplay by: Gitangshu Dey; Dialogues; Manu Sharma
- Story by: Shilpa Chaubey; Sushil Chaubey
- Directed by: Vikram Ghai
- Creative directors: Surabhi Horo; Fatema Rangila Raghvendra Singh
- Starring: See below
- Composers: Dony Hazarika; Udbhav Ojha
- Country of origin: India
- Original language: Hindi
- No. of episodes: 205

Production
- Producers: Sooraj Barjatya; Devansh Barjatya
- Production location: Bundi
- Editor: Shashank Singh
- Camera setup: Multi-camera
- Running time: 22 minutes
- Production company: Rajshri Productions

Original release
- Network: Colors TV
- Release: 19 December 2016 – 29 September 2017

Ek Shringaar — Swabhimaan (transl. Self-Respect – An Adornment) commonly abbreviated as Swabhimaan is an Indian television series. It was aired on Colors TV from 19 December 2016 to 29 September 2017. The show revolves around two sisters Meghna (Sangeeta Chauhan), Naina (Ankitta Sharma) and their mother Sharda (Prachi Shah) who has raised her daughters to be independent and self-sufficient. It replaced the show Swaragini. and was replaced by Show Laado – Veerpur Ki Mardani.

== Plot ==
Meghna and Naina are the beloved daughters of Sharda, a school teacher and single mother. After they graduate, they move to their uncle Vishnu's house with Sharda. Meghna falls in love with Kunal, the elder son of rich businessman Nandkishore whom she met in college days. Nandkishore rebuffs Sharda's proposal and humiliates her. But later, a royal marriage is fixed. Naina constantly bickers with kunal's younger brother Karan, who has health issues.

On the wedding day, Vishnu's wife Asha enrages Nandkishore who lays down condition that Meghna and Naina marry Kunal and Karan. Both couples marry, but Meghna vows to teach Nandkishore a lesson. His wife Nirmala lives under his domination. In reality her friend Sandhya and the governess of the Chauhans household, is Kunal's real mother. Naina befriends and helps the shy Karan overcome his hesitations. Vishnu's son Vishal falls in love with and marries Nandkishore's daughter Khyati.

After many turns of events, Naina and Karan fall in love and plan to get remarried. However it is revealed that Kunal is Sandhya's and not the real blood of Chauhan family, which leads to Nandkishore laying down an ultimatum for Kunal. Divorce Meghna and marry Saawri or leave the house. Kunal chooses his wife. After the departure of Kunal and Meghna, Naina is given all the responsibilities of the house. Soon all the women in the household depart from the mansion however Nandkishore soon realizes his mistakes and brings everyone together and begins treating everyone with love and respect. They have a family reunion.

== Cast ==
=== Main ===
- Sangeita Chauhan as Meghna Singh Chauhan / Meghna Singhania (née Solanki): Avinesh and Sharda's eldest daughter; Naina's elder sister; Gopal, Kalpana, Vishnu and Asha's niece; Vaibhav and Vishal's cousin; Kunal's wife; Devraj and Sandhya's daughter-in-law (2016-2017)
- Ankitta Sharma as Naina Singh Chauhan (née Solanki): Avinesh and Sharda's youngest daughter; Meghna's younger sister; Gopal, Kalpana, Vishnu and Asha's niece; Vaibhav and Vishal's cousin; Karan's wife; Nandkishore and Nirmala's daughter-in-law; Khyati's sister-in-law (2016-2017)
- Prachee Shah Paandya as Sharda Solanki (née Singh Rathore): Gopal and Vishnu's sister; Kalpana and Asha's sister-in-law; Vaibhav and Vishal's aunt; Avinesh's wife; Meghna and Naina's mother; Kunal and Karan's mother-in-law (2016-2017)
- Sahil Uppal as Kunal Singh Chauhan / Kunal Singhania: Devraj and Sandhya's son; Nandkishore and Nirmala's adoptive son; Karan and Khyati's adoptive brother; Sujan's adoptive grandson; Meghna's husband; Avinesh and Sharda's son-in-law; Naina's brother-in-law (2016-2017)
- Samridh Bawa as Karan Singh Chauhan: Nandkishore and Nirmala's eldest son; Khyati's elder brother; Kunal's adoptive brother; Sujan's grandson; Naina's husband; Avinesh and Sharda's son-in-law; Meghna's brother-in-law (2016-2017)

=== Recurring ===
- Kanwarjit Paintal as Sujan Singh Chauhan: Nandkishore's father; Karan and Khyati's grandfather; Kunal's adoptive grandfather (2016–2017)
- Vinay Jain as Nandkishore Singh Chauhan: Sujan's son; Nirmala's husband; Karan and Khyati's father; Kunal's adoptive father (2016–2017)
- Shweta Mahadik as Nirmala Singh Chauhan: Nandkishore's wife; Karan and Khyati's mother; Kunal's adoptive mother (2016–2017)
- Suchitra Pillai as Sandhya Singhania: Devraj's widow; Nirmala's friend; Kunal's mother; Chauhan’s governess (2016–2017)
- Aashika Bhatia as Khyati Singh Rathore (née Singh Chauhan): Nirmala and Nandkishore's youngest daughter; Karan's younger sister; Kunal's adoptive sister; Vishal's wife (2016–2017)
- Karan Singhmar as Vishal Singh Rathore: Asha and Vishnu's son; Meghna, Naina and Vaibhav's cousin; Khyati's husband (2016–2017)
- Anand Satyadev as Vaibhav Singh Rathore: Kalpana and Gopal's son; Meghna, Naina and Vishal's cousin (2016–2017)
- Jitendra Trehan as Vishnu Singh Rathore: Sharda and Gopal's brother; Asha's husband; Vishal's father (2016–2017)
- Shalini Arora as Asha Singh Rathore: Vishnu's wife; Vishal's mother (2016–2017)
- Manoj Bhaterjee as Gopal Singh Rathore: Sharda and Vishnu's brother; Kalpana's husband; Vaibhav's father (2016–2017)
- Akshaya Bhingarde as Kalpana Singh Rathore: Gopal's wife; Vaibhav's mother (2016–2017)
- Gulki Joshi as Sawri Dwivedi: Pushpa's daughter (2017)
- Anahita Jahanbaksh as Pushpa Dwivedi: Sawri's mother (2017)
- Khalid Siddiqui as Chief Minister Mehul Malik (2017)
- Manish Raisinghan as Shivraja "Shiva" Mahajan (2017)

=== Special appearances ===
- Sidharth Shukla as Parth Bhanushali from Dil Se Dil Tak
- Rashami Desai as Shorvori Bhanushali from Dil Se Dil Tak
- Jasmin Bhasin as Teni Bhanushali from Dil Se Dil Tak
- Keerti Gaekwad Kelkar as Simar Bhardwaj from Sasural Simar Ka

== Awards and nominations ==
Year	Award	Category	Recipient	result
2017	Indian Television Academy Awards	Best lyricist	Raghvendra Singh	Nominated
