= Manish Raisinghan =

Indian television actor

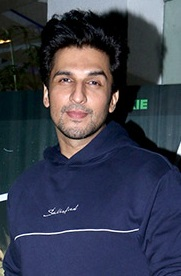
- Raisinghan in 2019
- Occupations: Actor, film maker, director, producer.
- Years active: 2004–present
- Spouse: Sangeita Chauhan (m. 2020)

Manish Raisinghan (born 22 July) is an Indian actor who works in Hindi television. He is known for his portrayals of Sameer Gheewala in Zee TV's daily soap opera Teen Bahuraniyaan and Siddhant Bharadwaj in Colors TV's Sasural Simar Ka.

== Career ==
Raisinghan played the character of Siddhant Bharadwaj in Colors TV's show Sasural Simar Ka. He recently had a friendly appearance as a film star in Madhur Bhandarkar's film Heroine.

After a long gap of 5 year, in August 2022 he made a comeback with Colors TV's Nima Denzongpa where he replaced Mohammed Iqbal Khan as Virat Sethi.

== Filmography ==
- Heroine - guest Appearance
- Kahani Rubberband Ki - Hero

Short films

Almost 2016 director Producer Director of photography Editor

Ankahee Baatein 2016 Actor

When I Met Myself 2016 Creative director Cinematographer

Toh Mera Galat He Sahi Hai 2016 director Director of photography Editor Producer

I Me Myself director Director of photography Editor Producer Actor VFX

Now U Listen Director Writer Producer

== Television ==
Year	Name	Role	Notes	Ref(s)
2004	Kaahin Kissii Roz	Anish Raheja		
2004–2007	Kahiin to Hoga	Varun Raheja		
2005	Raat Hone Ko Hai	Shekhar		
2006	Tumhari Disha	Veer		
2006	Jabb Love Hua	Arjun		
2006–2007	Betiyaan Apni Yaa Paraaya Dhan	Nirvan		
2007	Sapna Babul Ka... Bidaai	Saket		
2007–2009	Teen Bahuraaniyaan	Sameer Gheewala		
2008	Waaris	Sunny Shetty		
2009	Hum Dono Hain Alag Alag	Aditya Kothari		
2010–2011	Rang Badalti Odhni	Rahul Khanna		
2010–2011	Rakt Sambandh	Mohan		
2011–2016	Sasural Simar Ka	Siddhanth Bharadwaj		
2012	Bigg Boss 6	Guest	Special appearance	
2013	Bigg Boss 7	Guest	Special appearance	
2014–2015	Box Cricket League 1	Contestant	Player in 'Rowdy Bangalore'	
2015	Killerr Karaoke Atka Toh Latkah	Contestant		
2016	Box Cricket League 2	Contestant	Player in 'Lucknow Nawabs'	
2017	Ek Shringaar-Swabhiman	Shiva		
2022	Nima Denzongpa	Virat Sethi / Manav Deshmukh		
2023	Kyunkii Tum Hi Ho	Raju		
2023	Katha Ankahee	Raghav Sehgal		
2024	Gudiya Rani	Neil		
2026	Apsara	Shashank Bedi	Cameo	

== Awards ==
- 2015 Indian Television Academy Awards Rishtey-Naate Award
