= Sangeita Chauhan =

Indian actress

Sangeita Chauhaan
- Born: Sangeita Chauhaan; Vapi, Gujarat
- Occupation: Actress
- Years active: 2015–2019
- Known for: Ek Shringaar-Swabhiman, Rising Star, Bigg Boss 10, Piyaa Albela, Naagin 3
- Spouses: Chirag Shah (m. 2009; div. 2017): Manish Raisinghan (m. 2020)

Sangeita Chauhaan is an Indian actress. She was born in Vapi, Gujarat, India. She has appeared in the Kannada films Sharp Shooter and Luv U Alia. She is known as Meghna Chauhaan the lead in the Hindi Colors TV show, Ek Shringaar-Swabhiman.

== Early life ==
Sangeita Chauhan is from Vapi, Gujarat. Sangeita had a happy love marriage with her previous husband, Chirag and they were married for 8 years. However, she filed for divorce in 2017. She is now married to co-actor Manish Raisinghan since 30 June 2020 after they both fell in love on the sets of Ek Shringaar-Swabhiman.

== Filmography ==
Year	Film	Role	Language
2015	Luv U Alia	Alia	Kannada
2015	Sharp Shooter	Nandini	Kannada

=== Television ===
Year	Name	Role	Notes	Ref.
2016–2017	Ek Shringaar-Swabhiman	Meghna Solanki Singhania	Main female lead	
2016	Bigg Boss 10	Herself	Guest	
2017	Rising Star	Herself	Guest	
2018	Piyaa Albela	Meghna Kunal Goenka	Supporting role	
2019	Naagin 3	Avi	Special appearance for 3 episodes	
