= Sanjeev Kumar filmography =

Indian film actor

Sanjeev Kumar
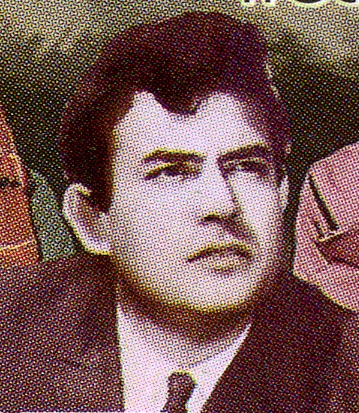
- Sanjeev Kumar on a 2013 stamp of India
- Born: Harihar Jethalal Jariwala
- Other name: Haribhai
- Occupation: Actor
- Years active: 1960–1985

Sanjeev Kumar started his acting career as a stage actor, starting with IPTA in Bombay. He later joined the Indian National Theatre. Even as a stage actor, he had a penchant for playing older roles; at age 22, he played an old man in an adaptation of Arthur Miller's All My Sons. In the following year, in the play Damru directed by AK Hangal, he again played the role of a 60-year-old with six children.

He made his film debut with a small role in Hum Hindustani in 1960. His first film as a protagonist was in Nishan (1965). In 1968, he acted alongside the famous actor of that time, Dilip Kumar, in Sangharsh. He also starred opposite Shammi Kapoor and Sadhana in the superhit film Sachaai (1969).

Movies such as Arjun Pandit, Sholay and Trishul, along with the remakes of Tamil films into Hindi such as Khilona, Yehi Hai Zindagi, Naya Din Nai Raat, Devata, Itni Si Baat and Ram Tere Kitne Naam exemplify his talents. He also did suspense-thriller films such as Qatl, Shikar, Uljhan and Trishna. Kumar also proved his ability to do comedy in films such as Manchali, Pati Patni Aur Woh, Angoor, Biwi-O-Biwi and Hero. He is well remembered for his versatility and genuine portrayal of his characters. His double role in the film Angoor was listed among the 25 best acting performances of Indian cinema by Forbes India on the occasion of celebrating 100 years of Indian Cinema.

== Filmography ==
Year	Title	Role	Notes
1960	Hum Hindustani	Police Inspector	Debut film
1964	Ramat Ramade Ram		
1964	Aao Pyaar Karen	Hari	
1965	Nishan	Badal / Kiran	Double role
1966	Alibaba Aur 40 Chor	Alibaba	
1966	Smuggler	Mohan	
1966	Pati Patni	Amar	
1966	Kalapi	Prince Sursinhji Takthasinghji Gohil	
1966	Husn Aur Ishq	Ashiq Hussain	
1966	Badal	Badal / Azaad	
1967	Aayega Aanewala	CID Inspector Raj Singh	
1967	Naunihal	Rakesh	
1967	Gunehgar	Deepak	
1967	Chhoti Si Mulaqat	Himself	Cameo appearance
1968	Mitti Ka Dev		
1968	Sunghursh	Dwarka Prasad	
1968	Shikar	Police Inspector Rai	Filmfare Award for Best Supporting Actor
1968	Saathi	Dr. Ashok	Guest appearance
1968	Raja Aur Runk	Sudhir/Vijay	Double role
1968	Mare Javun Pele Paar		
1968	Gauri	Sanjeev Kumar	
1968	Anokhi Raat	Baldev "Baldeva" Singh	
1968	Aashirwad	Dr. Biren	
1969	Bandhan	Advocate Ravi Sharma	Special appearance
1969	Oos Raat Ke Baad	Thakur Sunder Singh	
1969	Satyakam	Narendra "Naren" Sharma	
1969	Sachaai	Kishore Dayal	
1969	Jyoti	Nirmal	
1969	Jeene Ki Raah	Dr. Manohari	Guest appearance
1969	Insaf Ka Mandir	Sunil	
1969	Gustakhi Maaf	Jai	
1969	Dharti Kahe Pukar Ke	MotiRam	
1969	Chanda Aur Bijli	Sheru	Remake of Anandhai Anandhan
1969	Bombay by Nite	Santosh	
1970	Ho Jamalo		
1970	A Night in Calcutta		
1970	Khilona	Vijaykamal	Nominated; Filmfare Award for Best Actor
1970	Umang	Gopal	
1970	Priya		
1970	Maa Ka Aanchal	Bhagwan Dada	
1970	Jigar Ane Ami	Jigar	
1970	Insaan Aur Shaitan	Vijay / Jay (Bichho)	Double role
1970	Gunah Aur Kanoon	Rakesh	
1970	Devi	Dr. A.N. Shekhar	
1970	Dastak	Hamid Ahmed	National Film Award for Best Actor
1970	Bachpan	Kashi	
1971	Kangan	Sunil	
1971	Ek Paheli	Police Inspector	Cameo appearance
1971	Subah-O-Shaam	Naseer	
1971	Purani Pehchan	Dr. Prabhat	
1971	Anubhav	Amar Sen	
1971	Paras	Dharam Singh	
1971	Man Mandir	Deepak	
1971	Homaye Saadat	Naser	
1971	Donhi Gharcha Pahuna		
1972	Rivaaj	Shekhar	
1972	Parichay	Nilesh	Guest appearance
1972	Seeta Aur Geeta	Ravi	
1972	Koshish	Haricharan Mathur	National Film Award for Best Actor; BFJA Awards for Best Actor (Hindi); Nominated-Filmfare Award for Best Actor
1972	Sabse Bada Sukh	Narrator	
1972	Jai Jwala	Himself	Special appearance
1973	Anhonee	Inspector Sunil	
1973	Rocky Mera Naam	Rocky 'Vimal' / Kamal	
1973	Suraj Aur Chanda	Suraj	
1973	Manchali	Sushil Kumar	
1973	Door Nahin Manzil	Kewal	
1973	Anamika	Devendra Dutt	
1973	Agni Rekha	Suresh Verma	
1973	Bharatha Vilas	Himself	Tamil film; Guest appearance
1974	Manoranjan	Constable Ratan / Sheru	
1974	Aap Ki Kasam	Mohan	
1974	Naya Din Nai Raat	Anand / Swami Rahasyanand / Mr. Sarang / Seth Dhanraj / Sher Singh / Four Other Roles	Played 9 different characters.
1974	Kunwara Baap	Doctor	Special appearance
1974	Shaandaar	Rajan	Remake of Kannada film Kasturi Nivasa
1974	Oorvasi		
1974	Imaan	Madhav / Lakhan	Double role
1974	Dawat	Defence Advocate	
1974	Chowkidar	Dr. Shyam	
1974	Charitraheen	Indrajeet Mukherjee	
1974	Archana	Prakash	
1975	Apne Rang Hazaar	Sunil Kapoor	
1975	Aandhi	J.K.	Filmfare Award for Best Actor
1975	Aakraman	Major Ajay Verma	
1975	Sholay	Thakur Baldev Singh	Nominated–Filmfare Award for Best Actor
1975	Apne Dushman	Doctor	
1975	Faraar	Inspector Sanjay	
1975	Mausam	Dr. Amarnath Gill	Lion Club of North Calcutta Actor of the Year. Nominated–Filmfare Award for Best Actor
1975	Uljhan	C.I.D. Inspector Anand Chander	
1975	Dhoti Lota Aur Chowpatty	Inspector Wagle	
1976	Zindagi	Raghu Shukla	Nominated–Filmfare Award for Best Actor
1976	Do Ladkiyan	Avinash	
1976	Arjun Pandit	Arjun Pandit	Filmfare Award for Best Actor
1977	Immaan Dharam	Kabir Das	
1977	Yehi Hai Zindagi	Anand Narayan	Nominated–Filmfare Award for Best Actor
1977	Shatranj Ke Khiladi	Mirza Sajjad Ali	
1977	Dhoop Chhaon	Dr. Paras	
1977	Alaap	Raja Bahadur	Guest appearance
1977	Mukti	Ratan	
1977	Vishwasghat	Mahesh / King	Double Role
1977	Paapi	Dr. Ashok Roy	
1977	Dil Aur Patthar	Prithvi	
1977	Apnapan	Raja Yashpal Singh	Special appearance
1977	Angaare	Rakesh	
1978	Udeekan	Major	Special appearance
1978	Trishul	Raj Kumar Gupta / R. K. Gupta	Nominated–Filmfare Award for Best Supporting Actor
1978	Pati Patni Aur Woh	Ranjeet Chaddha	Nominated–Filmfare Award for Best Actor
1978	Trishna	Dr. Sunil Gupta	
1978	Devata	Tony/Tarun Kumar Gupta	Nominated–Filmfare Award for Best Actor
1978	Tumhare Liye	Prakash/Gangadhar Upadhyay	
1978	Swarag Narak	Pandit Sohanlal Tripathi	
1978	Saawan Ke Geet	Kishan	
1978	Muqaddar	Inspector Vijay Saxena	
1979	Hamare Tumhare	Jairaj Verma	
1979	Inspector Eagle	Inspector Eagle	
1979	Jaani Dushman	Thakur	
1979	Griha Pravesh	Amar	
1979	Kaala Patthar	Dr. Ramesh Mathur	Special appearance
1979	Nauker	Amar	
1979	Maan Apmaan	Shankar	
1979	Ghar Ki Laaj	Devender/Debu	
1980	Takkar	Kishan/Suraj	
1980	Hum Nahin Sudhrenge		
1980	Jyoti Bane Jwala	Himself	Special appearance
1980	Be-Reham	Police Commissioner Kumar Anand	
1980	Abdullah	Ameer	Special appearance
1980	Hum Paanch	Krishna	
1980	Swayamvar	Ram	
1980	Patthar Se Takkar	Bindra	
1980	Fauji Chacha	Fauji Chacha	Punjabi film
1981	Waqt Ki Deewar	Vikram	
1981	Chehre Pe Chehra	Dr. Wilson / Blackstone	
1981	Ladies Tailor	Mehboob	
1981	Itni Si Baat	Raja	
1981	Biwi-O-Biwi	Colonel Mangal Singh/Shankar	Double role
1981	Daasi	Anand	
1981	Silsila	Dr. V.K. Anand	
1982	Haathkadi	Harimohan/Rai Saheb Gopaldas Mittal	
1982	Shriman Shrimati	Shankar Lal	
1982	Angoor	Ashok Tilak/Ashok Tilak	Double role; Nominated–Filmfare Award for Best Actor
1982	Suraag	Professor Saxena	
1982	Sawaal	Dhanpathrai Mehta	
1982	Khud-Daar	Hari Srivastav	
1982	Ayaash	Thakur Jaswant Singh	
1982	Vidhaata	Abu Baba	Nominated–Filmfare Award for Best Supporting Actor
1982	Sindoor Bane Jwala		
1982	Namkeen	Gerulal	
1982	Log Kya Kahenge	Dr. Jeevan	
1983	Hero	Inspector Damodar Mathur	
1984	Pakhandi	Ashok Ahuja	
1984	Bad Aur Badnam	James Carlo	
1984	Lakhon Ki Baat	Advocate Prem Sagar	
1984	Yaadgaar	Rai Sahab Kalpnath Rai	
1984	Meraa Dost Meraa Dushman	Goli Chacha	
1985	Ram Tere Kitne Naam	Ram Kumar/Petu Ram	
1985	Zabardast	Ratan Kumar/Ramesh Kumar	
1985	Rusvai		
1986	Bud-Kaar	Inspector Suraj	Posthumous release
1986	Qatl	Rakesh	Posthumous release
1986	Kaanch Ki Deewar	Jaswant Singh/ Durjan Singh	Posthumous release
1986	Love and God	Qais-E-Emir (Majnu)	Posthumous release
1986	Haathon Ki Lakeeren	Dr. Bhanupratap	Posthumous release
1986	Baat Ban Jaye	Suraj Singh / Ravi Khanna	Posthumous release
1987	Raahee	Dr. Prabhat Kumar	Posthumous release
1987	Hiraasat	Himself	Posthumous release; Special appearance
1987	Society	Doctor	Posthumous release
1988	Namumkin	Joseph D'Souza	Posthumous release; Special appearance
1988	Do Waqt Ki Roti	Jailor Vijay Saxena	Posthumous release
1989	Oonch Neech Beech	Hariram Pandey	Posthumous release
1993	Professor Ki Padosan	Professor Vidyadhar	Posthumous release; Last film
