= 26th Filmfare Awards =

1979 awards for Hindi cinema

- Date: April 6, 1979
- Site: Shanmukhananda hall, Bombay

Highlights
- Best Film: Main Tulsi Tere Aangan Ki
- Best Actor: Amitabh Bachchan for Don
- Best Actress: Nutan for Main Tulsi Tere Aangan Ki
- Most awards: Don & Main Tulsi Tere Aangan Ki (3)
- Most nominations: Main Tulsi Tere Aangan Ki & Muqaddar Ka Sikandar (9)

The 26th Filmfare Awards were held on April 6, 1979.

Main Tulsi Tere Aangan Ki and Muqaddar Ka Sikandar led the ceremony with 9 nominations each, followed by Satyam Shivam Sundaram with 6 nominations, and Don and Trishul with 5 nominations each.

Don and Main Tulsi Tere Aangan Ki won 3 awards each, thus becoming the most-awarded films at the ceremony, with the former winning Best Actor (for Amitabh Bachchan), and the latter winning Best Film and Best Actress (for Nutan).

The ceremony was notable as Nutan became the first actress in the history of Indian Cinema to win the Best Actress award 5 times, breaking the previous record held by Meena Kumari (with 4 wins) for 13 years. She was nominated for both Best Actress and Best Supporting Actress for Main Tulsi Tere Aangan Ki, winning the former. Her niece Kajol matched her record 32 years later, at the 55th Filmfare Awards with her 5th win for My Name Is Khan (2010).

Sanjeev Kumar received dual nominations for Best Actor for his performances in Devata and Pati Patni Aur Woh, but lost to Amitabh Bachchan, who himself received triple nominations in the category for his performances in Don, Muqaddar Ka Sikandar and Trishul, winning for the former.

Legendary filmmaker Satyajit Ray won his first and only Filmfare award at the ceremony, winning Best Director for Shatranj Ke Khilari.

== Main awards ==
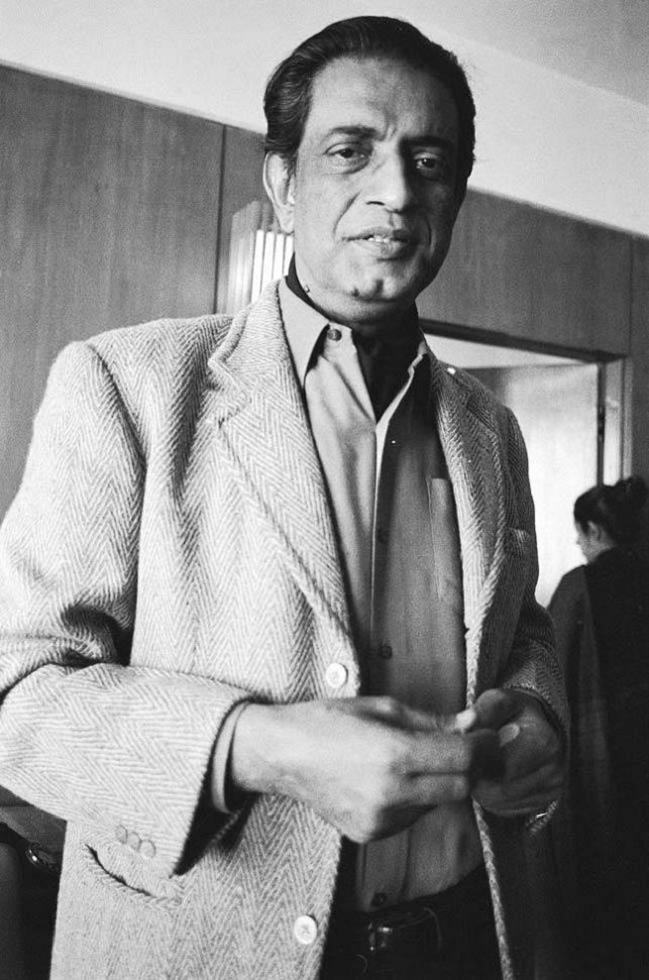
Satyajit Ray — Best Director winner for Shatranj ke Khiladi

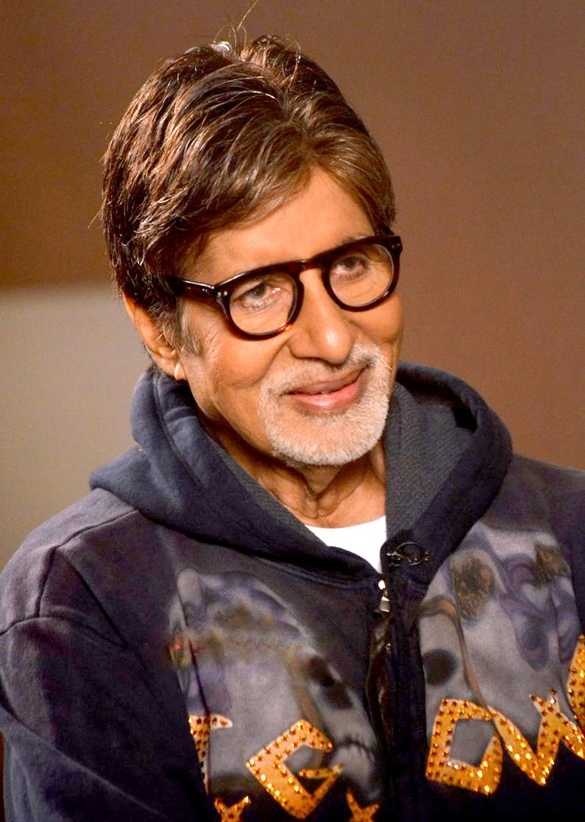
Amitabh Bachchan — Best Actor winner for Don

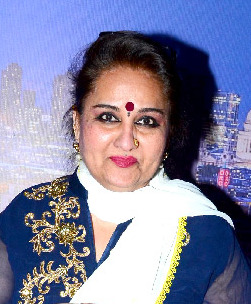
Reena Roy — Best Supporting Actress winner for Apnapan

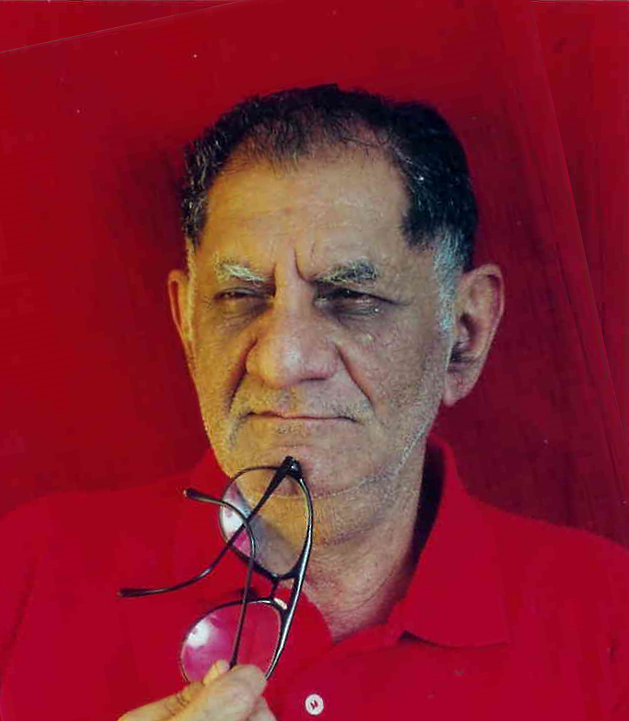
Anand Bakshi — Best Lyricist for "Aadmi Musafir Hai" (Apnapan)

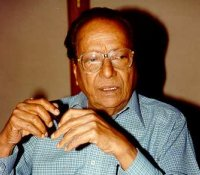
Kamleshwar — Best Screenplay winner for Pati Patni Aur Woh

=== Best Film ===
Main Tulsi Tere Aangan Ki

- Ankhiyon Ke Jharokhon Se
- Muqaddar Ka Sikandar
- Shatranj Ke Khilari
- Trishul

=== Best Director ===
Satyajit Ray – Shatranj Ke Khilari

- Prakash Mehra – Muqaddar Ka Sikandar
- Raj Kapoor – Satyam Shivam Sundaram
- Raj Khosla – Main Tulsi Tere Aangan Ki
- Yash Chopra – Trishul

=== Best Actor ===
Amitabh Bachchan – Don

- Amitabh Bachchan – Muqaddar Ka Sikandar
- Amitabh Bachchan – Trishul
- Sanjeev Kumar – Devata
- Sanjeev Kumar – Pati Patni Aur Woh

=== Best Actress ===
Nutan – Main Tulsi Tere Aangan Ki

- Raakhee – Trishna
- Ranjeeta – Ankhiyon Ke Jharokhon Se
- Rekha – Ghar
- Zeenat Aman – Satyam Shivam Sundaram

=== Best Supporting Actor ===
Saeed Jaffrey – Shatranj Ke Khiladi

- Danny Denzongpa – Devata
- Randhir Kapoor – Kasme Vaade
- Sanjeev Kumar – Trishul
- Vinod Khanna – Muqaddar Ka Sikandar

=== Best Supporting Actress ===
Reena Roy – Apnapan

- Asha Parekh – Main Tulsi Tere Aangan Ki
- Nutan – Main Tulsi Tere Aangan Ki
- Ranjeeta – Pati Patni Aur Woh
- Rekha – Muqaddar Ka Sikandar

=== Best Comic Actor ===
Deven Verma – Chor Ke Ghar Chor

- Asrani – Pati Patni Aur Woh
- Deven Verma – Khatta Meetha
- Keshto Mukherjee – Azaad
- Ram Sethi – Muqaddar Ka Sikandar

=== Best Story ===
Ghar – Dinesh Thakur

- Kitaab – Samaresh Basu
- Main Tulsi Tere Aangan Ki – Chandrakant Kakodkar
- Muqaddar Ka Sikandar – Laxmikant Sharma
- Trishul – Salim–Javed

=== Best Screenplay ===
Pati Patni Aur Woh – Kamleshwar

=== Best Dialogue ===
Main Tulsi Tere Aangan Ki – Rahi Masoom Raza

=== Best Music Director ===
Satyam Shivam Sundaram – Laxmikant–Pyarelal

- Ankhiyon Ke Jharokhon Se – Ravindra Jain
- Don – Kalyanji-Anandji
- Des Pardes – Rajesh Roshan
- Shalimar – R.D. Burman

=== Best Lyricist ===
Apnapan – Anand Bakshi for Aadmi Musafir Hai

- Ankhiyon Ke Jharokhon Se – Ravindra Jain for Ankhiyon Ke Jharokhon Se
- Don – Anjaan for Khaike Paan
- Main Tulsi Tere Aangan Ki – Anand Bakshi for Main Tulsi Tere Aangan Ki
- Satyam Shivam Sundaram – Pandit Narendra Sharma for Satyam Shivam Sundaram

=== Best Playback Singer, Male ===
Don – Kishore Kumar for Khaike Paan

- Apnapan – Mohammad Rafi for Aadmi Musafir Hai
- Muqaddar Ka Sikandar – Kishore Kumar for O Saathi Re
- Satyam Shivam Sundaram – Mukesh for Chanchal Sheetal
- Shalimar – Kishore Kumar for Hum Bewafa

=== Best Playback Singer, Female ===
Don – Asha Bhosle for Yeh Mera Dil

- Ankhiyon Ke Jharokhon Se – Hemlata for Ankhiyon Ke Jharokhon Se
- Main Tulsi Tere Aangan Ki – Shobha Gurtu for Saiyyan Rooth Gaye
- Muqaddar Ka Sikandar – Asha Bhosle for O Saathi Re
- Shalimar – Usha Uthup for One Two Cha Cha Cha

=== Best Art Direction ===
Des Pardes – T. K. Desai

=== Best Cinematography ===
Satyam Shivam Sundaram – Radhu Karmakar

=== Best Editing ===
Badaltey Rishtey – B. Prasad

=== Best Sound ===
Devata – Ranjit Biswas

== Critics' awards ==
=== Best Film ===
Arvind Desai Ki Ajeeb Dastaan

=== Best Documentary ===
Malfunction

== Biggest Winners ==
- Main Tulsi Tere Aangan Ki – 3/9
- Don – 3/5
- Shatranj Ke Khiladi – 2/3
- Apnapan – 2/3
- Satyam Shivam Sundaram – 2/6
- Trishul – 0/5
- Muqaddar Ka Sikandar – 0/9

== See also ==
- 28th Filmfare Awards
- 27th Filmfare Awards
- Filmfare Awards
