= Pandhayam =

Pandhayam (transl. Bet) may refer to these Indian Tamil-language films:

- Pandhayam (1967 film)
- Pandhayam (2008 film)
