= Apnapan =

- Theatrical release poster
- Directed by: J. Om Prakash
- Written by: Kishore Sahu
- Produced by: J. Om Prakash
- Starring: Jeetendra; Reena Roy; Sulakshana Pandit; Sanjeev Kumar
- Cinematography: V. Babasaheb
- Edited by: Nand Kumar
- Music by: Laxmikant Pyarelal
- Production company: FILMYUG Pvt Ltd
- Release date: 28 December 1977
- Running time: 138 minutes
- Country: India
- Language: Hindi

Apnapan (transl. Kinship) is a 1977 Indian Hindi-language drama film, produced and directed by J. Om Prakash under the FILMYUG Pvt. Ltd. banner. It stars Sanjeev Kumar, Jeetendra, Reena Roy and Sulakshana Pandit, and has music composed by Laxmikant Pyarelal. The film is recorded as a Super Hit at the box office. This film was remade in Telugu as Illalu (1981).

Roy played a selfish gold-digger who abandons her husband and child, which garnered her critical acclaim and a Filmfare Award for Best Supporting Actress. However, she rejected the award citing that she was among the film's protagonists and not supporting actors, thus becoming the second actress (after Vyjayanthimala for 1955's Devdas) to decline a Filmfare Award.

== Plot ==
Kamini (Reena Roy) abandons Anil Mehra (Jeetendra) and their baby son Prakash for her own selfish reasons. A few years later, Anil falls in love with Radhika (Sulakshana Pandit) and marries her. Radhika treats Prakash who is now a six-year-old, as her own son. Radhika meets Kamini in a store and they become friends, not knowing about each other's histories. When Kamini realizes that Radhika is Anil's second wife and her own son's stepmother, she longs to be with Prakash and be a mother to him again. When he has an accident, she donates her own blood to save him. But when she asks Anil to give her son back to her, he doesn't agree. A heartbroken Kamini can only say goodbye.

== Cast ==
- Jeetendra as Anil Mehra
- Reena Roy as Kamini Agarwal
- Sulakshana Pandit as Radhika Sharma
- Sanjeev Kumar as Raja Yashpal Singh (Special Appearance)
- Iftekhar as Kishan Agarwal
- Pinchoo Kapoor as Mr. Desai
- Aruna Irani as Gangubai
- Birbal as Ronak Singh
- Sudhir Dalvi (special appearance as a beggar in the song Aadmi Musafir Hai)
- Nivedita Joshi-Saraf (special appearance as a beggar child in the song Aadmi Musafir Hai)
- Raj Mehra
- Vishal Desai (credited as Master Bittu) as Prakash
- Gagan Bakshi - Prakash as a small infant

== Soundtrack ==
Lyrics: Anand Bakshi

#	Title	Singer(s)
1	"Dil Pe Zara Hath Rakh Lo"	Asha Bhosle
2	"Is Duniya Mein"	Kishore Kumar, Lata Mangeshkar
3	"Ek Din Mein Sau Baar"	Dilraj Kaur, Anuradha Paudwal
4	"Aadmi Musafir Hai" (Sad)	Lata Mangeshkar, Mohammed Rafi
5	"Aadmi Musafir Hai" (Happy)	Lata Mangeshkar, Mohammed Rafi
6	"Somwar Ko Hum Mile"	Kishore Kumar, Sulakshana Pandit

== Awards ==
26th Filmfare Awards:

Won

- Best Supporting Actress – Reena Roy (refused)

Nominated

- Best Lyricist – Anand Bakshi for "Aadmi Musafir Hai"
- Best Male Playback Singer – Mohammed Rafi for "Aadmi Musafir Hai"

== In popular culture ==
- The 1945 book Eve by the English writer James Hadley Chase plays a central role in the meeting of the protagonists Anil and Radhika.
