= Door Nahin Manzil =

Dur Naheen Manzil
- Starring: Sanjeev Kumar and Pradeep Kumar
- Music by: Shankar–Jaikishan
- Release date: 1973
- Country: India
- Language: Hindi

Dur Naheen Manzil is a 1973 Bollywood drama film. The film stars Sanjeev Kumar and Pradeep Kumar.

== Songs ==
1. "Ajeeb Zindagi Hai Ye" – Mohammed Rafi
2. "Bezubaan Dil Shor Na Macha" (Happy) – Suman Kalyanpur
3. "Aise Lagi Jaise Koi Mithi Agan" – Mahendra Kapoor
4. "No No Aisa Na Karo" – Sharda
5. "Liye Chal Gaddiya" – Suman Kalyanpur
