= Pandhayam (1967 film) =

- Poster
- Directed by: A. Kasilingam
- Screenplay by: A. Kasilingam
- Story by: Madurai Thirumaran
- Produced by: A. Kasilingam
- Starring: Gemini Ganesan; Vijaya Nirmala
- Cinematography: G. Durai
- Edited by: K. Perumal; A. Sastha
- Music by: T. R. Pappa
- Production company: Emkay Movies
- Distributed by: Subbu
- Release date: 29 September 1967
- Running time: 170 minutes
- Country: India
- Language: Tamil

Pandhayam (transl. Bet) is a 1967 Indian Tamil-language film produced and directed by A. Kasilingam, who also wrote the screenplay from a story by Madurai Thirumaran. The film stars Gemini Ganesan and Vijaya Nirmala. It was released on 29 September 1967. The film was remade in Hindi as Sachaai (1969) and in Telugu as Manchi Mitrulu (1969).

== Cast ==
- Gemini Ganesan
- Vijaya Nirmala
- A. V. M. Rajan
- Nagesh
- Sailasri
- Seethalakshmi
- Jothi

== Production ==
Pandhayam was produced and directed by A. Kasilingam under the banner Emkay Movies. Kasilingam also wrote the screenplay, based on a story by Madurai Thirumaran. Cinematography was handled by G. Durai, art direction by D. S. Godwankar, and the editing was jointly handled by K. Perumal and A. Sastha. The final length of the film was 3,943 metres (12,936 ft).

== Soundtrack ==
The soundtrack was composed by T. R. Pappa, and the lyrics were written by Kannadasan.

Track listing
No.	Title	Length
1.	"Oruvar pinnale (P. Susheela)"

== Release and reception ==
Pandhayam was released on 29 September 1967, and distributed by Subbu. Kalki praised the film for its story and cast performances.

== Bibliography ==
- Cowie, Peter; Elley, Derek (1977). World Filmography: 1967. Fairleigh Dickinson University Press. ISBN 978-0-498-01565-6.
