= Manchali =

- Poster
- Directed by: Raja Nawathe
- Written by: Krishan Chander (dialogues)
- Screenplay by: G. R. Kamat
- Story by: Satyendra Sharat
- Produced by: Raja Nawathe
- Starring: Sanjeev Kumar; Leena Chandavarkar; Nazima; Krishna kant Nirupa Roy
- Cinematography: Fali Mistry
- Edited by: Raja Nawathe
- Music by: Laxmikant–Pyarelal
- Release date: 1973
- Country: India
- Language: Hindi

Manchali is a 1973 Hindi romantic drama movie produced and directed by Raja Nawathe, starring Sanjeev Kumar, Leena Chandavarkar, Nazima and Nirupa Roy. The title track was very catchy and popular. It was one of the best known films with Sanjeev Kumar in a comedy role (others being Vidhaata, Seeta Aur Geeta, and Angoor). The music directors were Laxmikant-Pyarelal. This movie story was based on the novel Swayamber by Satyendra Sharat.

== Plot ==
The story is about a rich spoiled girl Leena who does not want to get married and hires a husband. She lives with her uncle and aunt who are her wealthy guardians till she gets married as per the provisions of her late father's will. Being a headstrong and self-willed person, Leena concocts a plan on the advice of her best friend Pushpa, to hire a fake husband under a marriage contract in order to be eligible for her wealth. While her uncle and aunt are looking for suitable marriage proposals for her, She herself gives an advertisement in the newspaper for an eligible bachelor willing to get into a fake marriage contract for some monetary gains. Her advertisement is answered by Sushil Kumar, a good-looking resident of Dehra Dun amongst many. She decides on Sushil Kumar along with her friend Pushpa and conveys to Sushil Kumar that she will come to Dehra Dun to marry him by the contract. She then announces to her uncle and aunt that she has found a suitable life partner and she is going to Dehra Dun to marry him alone.

Uncle and aunt are very upset but since Uncle has a soft corner for her, he gives her some money for the journey with his blessings. On reaching Dehra Dun, she meets Sushil Kumar at the station but on finding him obnoxious looking (not at all like his photo) decides to hide until he goes away, hence not meeting him at all. A street-smart young man who helps her in this (Sanjeev Kumar) becomes her confidante that she is here to hire a fake husband. He helps her in finding a hotel for the night and with his fast-talking street smart ways introduces himself as a candidate for the post. Stuck in a corner and not wanting to go back home without a husband, She agrees to marry him and they both sign a contract that it is a fake marriage and he is to give her divorce after two days of her inheriting her wealth. On reaching her home, to her surprise, Her uncle and aunt are very impressed with her husband (introduced as Sushil Kumar) and take to him very well. He is also able to win over all her friends including Pushpa.

However, he remains civil with her and agrees to behave as she says. She wants her uncle to hand over her wealth and then Sushil Kumar and she will get a divorce but he does not seem to want to go away from her home as he misses his train to Dehra Dun. One day he disappears for a few hours and she thinks he has absconded. But he arrives home and says that he was negotiating a deal for an apple orchard to give her a present. His slick answers irritate her and she sends him with some goons to settle the orchard deal, planning that the goons should beat him up to scare him. Instead after a few hours, Sushil Kumar comes back saying that he bashed up the goons himself. Seeing his cuts and bruises, Leena repents and starts to develop soft feelings for Sushil Kumar. Now Sushil Kumar starts going out to outings and clubs with Pushpa and her friends leaving Leena behind. Leena becomes jealous of Pushpa and they have a fight over Sushil Kumar. After forcefully staying 2 days at her home, Sushil Kumar says he could stay here forever and start a "Husband on Hire" business as all her friends like him.

Leena panics and forbids him from meeting her friends. She then pushes her uncle and aunt to hand over her wealth now that she is married but her uncle says that they will have a reception party to introduce her husband to society and then she will get her wealth. On the morning of the party, uncle and aunt hand over her property papers, cash and jewellery to her and Sushil Kumar, with their blessings, saying that Sushil Kumar is a joint partner in all that she owns, as they find him more sensible and capable than Leena, to handle her wealth. Leena is so upset that she does not notice Sushil Kumar putting everything in a briefcase and driving away. Not able to share her concerns about Sushil Kumar robbing her, with anyone in the house; she speaks to Pushpa as she comes for the reception party and the two friends reconcile. Everyone starts to come for the party and then Sushil Kumar comes. After the Party Leena lashes out at Sushil Kumar that he has deceived her and robbed her of her wealth.

Then Sushil Kumar tells her that he spent the whole day, transferring the property back in her name only, putting the cash and jewellery in a bank locker, the key to which he gives her, and getting special divorce papers made by a magistrate that they just have to sign out of court. Leena is very shamefaced. Then he changes back into his old worn-out clothes and says goodbye to leave her. Then Leena falls at his feet and says that she loves him and can't live without him. To this, he says that he will never live on his wife's money and if she loves him she will have to live in his home in poverty. As she agrees to this, Pushpa and the original Sushil Kumar walk in. Leena is shocked and surprised, but Pushpa tears off Sushil Kumar's false beard and tells her that it was her own fiancé in disguise as Sushil Kumar to scare her at Dehra Dun station. In reality, he is the manager of the real Sushil Kumar, who is this hired husband (Sanjeev Kumar) who is a very rich landlord of Dehra Dun. The real Sushil Kumar then tells Leena that he loves her and they live happily ever after.

== Cast ==
- Sanjeev Kumar as Sushil Kumar
- Leena Chandavarkar as Leena
- Nirupa Roy Leena's aunty
- Nazima as Pushpa
- Shrikant Moghe guy in Red suite, Mohan Kumar
- Shah Agha
- Krishnakant as Leena's uncle
- Surekha Naik as Pushpa's friend
- Sabina as Pushpa's friend (Sabeena)
- Yasmin as Pushpa's friend

== Soundtrack ==
#	Title	Singer(s)
1	"O Manchali Kahan Chali"	Kishore Kumar
2	"Gham Ka Fasana"	Kishore Kumar, Leena Chandavarkar (dialogues only)
3	"Mile Kahin Do Ajnabee"	Kishore Kumar
4	"Kali Kali Choome Gali Gali Ghume"	Lata Mangeshkar
5	"Tan Man Dhan Sab Hai Tera"	Mukesh
