= Filmfare Award for Best Actor =

Annual award for Hindi films

Filmfare Awards for Best Actor
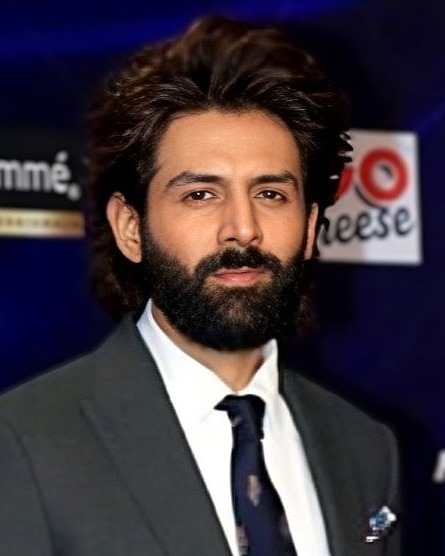
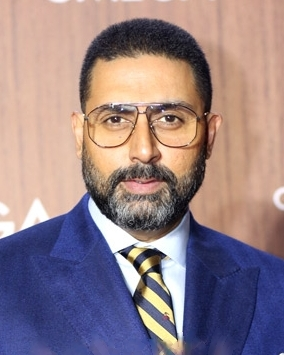
- The 2025 recipients: Kartik Aaryan for Chandu Champion, and Abhishek Bachchan for I Want to Talk
- Awarded for: Best Performance by an Actor in a Leading Role
- Country: India
- Presented by: Filmfare
- First award: Dilip Kumar, Daag (1954)
- Currently held by: Kartik Aaryan, (Chandu Champion) (2025); Abhishek Bachchan, (I Want to Talk) (2025)
- Website: Filmfare Awards

The Filmfare Award for Best Actor is an award presented annually at the Filmfare Awards to an actor via a jury; it is given by Filmfare for Hindi (Bollywood) films. The award was first given in 1954. The most recent winner, as of 2025, are Kartik Aaryan and Abhishek Bachchan.

== Superlatives ==
Superlative	Actor	Record
Actor with most awards	Dilip Kumar, Shah Rukh Khan	8
Actor with most nominations	Amitabh Bachchan	34
Actor with most consecutive nominations	Aamir Khan (1989-97)	9
Actor with nominations in most decades	Amitabh Bachchan	6
Actor with most nominations in a single year	Amitabh Bachchan (1979, 1983); Shah Rukh Khan (2005)	3
Actor with most nominations without ever winning	Salman Khan; Ajay Devgn; Akshay Kumar	10
Oldest winner	Amitabh Bachchan	67
Oldest nominee	Amitabh Bachchan	80
Youngest winner	Rishi Kapoor (1973)	21
Youngest nominee	Darsheel Safary (2008)	10 years, 11 months

- Dilip Kumar holds the record for the most consecutive wins, having received the Best Actor award for three consecutive years from 1956 to 1958. Six other actors have won in consecutive years: Rajesh Khanna (1971–1972), Sanjeev Kumar (1976–1977), Amitabh Bachchan (1978–1979), Naseeruddin Shah (1981–1982), Shah Rukh Khan (1998–1999), and Ranbir Kapoor (2012–2013).
- Several actors have won both Best Actor and Best Supporting Actor awards. These include Ashok Kumar, Sanjeev Kumar, Amitabh Bachchan, Shammi Kapoor, Anil Kapoor, Anupam Kher, Sunny Deol, Jackie Shroff, Nana Patekar, Farhan Akhtar, Rishi Kapoor, Irrfan Khan, and Rajkummar Rao.
- Three actors were nominated for both categories—Best Actor and Best Supporting Actor—for the same role: Raaj Kumar for Kaajal (1966), Ashok Kumar for Aashirwad (1970), and Kamal Haasan for Saagar (1986). Ashok Kumar and Kamal Haasan won the Best Actor award, while Raaj Kumar won for Best Supporting Actor.
- A total of ten actors have won Best Actor in both the Popular and Critics categories: Anupam Kher, Shah Rukh Khan, Anil Kapoor, Amitabh Bachchan, Hrithik Roshan, Aamir Khan, Ranbir Kapoor, Rishi Kapoor, Shahid Kapoor, Irrfan Khan, Ranveer Singh, and Rajkummar Rao. Four of them won both awards in the same year: Shah Rukh Khan (1994), Hrithik Roshan (2004), Amitabh Bachchan (2006), and Ranbir Kapoor (2012).
- Three actors won Best Actor for their debut performances: Rishi Kapoor (Bobby, 1974), Anupam Kher (Saaransh, 1985), and Hrithik Roshan (Kaho Naa... Pyaar Hai, 2001). Other debut nominees include Sunny Deol (Betaab, 1984) and Darsheel Safary (Taare Zameen Par, 2008).
- Darsheel Safary became the youngest Best Actor nominee at age 11 for Taare Zameen Par (2008), while Rishi Kapoor became the youngest winner at age 21 for Bobby (1974).
- Aamir Khan holds the record for the most consecutive nominations, with nine between 1989 and 1997, winning for Raja Hindustani (1997). Amitabh Bachchan followed with eight consecutive nominations from 1976 to 1983, winning in 1978 and 1979 for Amar Akbar Anthony and Don, respectively.
- Dilip Kumar was the most awarded actor of the 1950s, winning four times. He continued his success in the 1960s with three more wins. Rajesh Khanna led the 1970s with three Best Actor awards. The 1980s saw Naseeruddin Shah emerge as the most recognized, also with three wins. Shah Rukh Khan dominated the 1990s with four wins. Hrithik Roshan was the leading actor of the 2000s with four awards, while Ranbir Kapoor received the most wins in the 2010s, securing three Best Actor trophies.
- Amitabh Bachchan and Shah Rukh Khan hold the record for the most Best Actor nominations in a single year, with three each: Bachchan in 1979 and 1983, and Khan in 2005.
- Dilip Kumar, Amitabh Bachchan, and Shah Rukh Khan are the most awarded actors across all acting categories at Filmfare, each with eight wins. Kumar and Khan have eight Best Actor awards, while Bachchan has five Best Actor and three Best Supporting Actor awards. Bachchan is also the most nominated actor in major acting categories with a total of 42 nominations.
- Amitabh Bachchan has been nominated in this category across six decades (1970s–2020s) and has won in four of them. Dilip Kumar has nominations across five decades (1950s–1990s) and wins in three. Shah Rukh Khan has received nominations in four decades (1990s–2020s) and has won in three. Ajay Devgn has received nominations in four decades (1990s–2020s).
- Hrithik Roshan, Shah Rukh Khan, and Salman Khan are the only actors to be nominated twice for the same role. Roshan was nominated multiple times for the characters Rohit Mehra and Krishna Mehra in the Krrish series, winning in 2004 for Koi... Mil Gaya. Shah Rukh Khan was nominated for Don (2007, 2012), and Salman Khan for Dabangg (2011, 2013).
- The character Devdas is the only role to have earned two actors the Best Actor award: Dilip Kumar in 1956 and Shah Rukh Khan in 2003.
- Ranbir Kapoor is the only actor to win Best Actor for portraying a real-life Best Actor winner, receiving the award for Sanju (2019), based on the life of Sanjay Dutt.
- On three occasions, two actors from the same film were nominated for Best Actor:
  - Dostana (1981): Amitabh Bachchan and Shatrughan Sinha
  - Shakti (1983): Dilip Kumar (winner) and Amitabh Bachchan
  - Hum Dil De Chuke Sanam (2000): Ajay Devgn and Salman Khan
- Irrfan Khan is the only actor to receive the Best Actor award posthumously, winning in 2021 for Angrezi Medium.
- Ashok Kumar, Nana Patekar, and Amitabh Bachchan have each won both the National Film Award and the Filmfare Award for Best Actor for the same role. Bachchan has done so twice.

=== Multiple wins ===
Wins	Recipient
8	Dilip Kumar, Shah Rukh Khan
5	Amitabh Bachchan
4	Hrithik Roshan, Ranbir Kapoor
3	Rajesh Khanna, Naseeruddin Shah, Aamir Khan, Ranveer Singh
2	Raj Kapoor, Dev Anand, Ashok Kumar, Sunil Dutt, Sanjeev Kumar, Anil Kapoor, Irrfan Khan

=== Multiple nominations ===
Nominations	Recipient
34	Amitabh Bachchan
28	Shah Rukh Khan
19	Dilip Kumar, Aamir Khan
16	Hrithik Roshan
14	Rajesh Khanna
11	Sanjeev Kumar
10	Salman Khan, Ajay Devgn, Ranbir Kapoor

== Winners and nominees ==
Table key
‡	Indicates the winner
†	Indicates a posthumous winner

=== 1950s ===
Year	Photos of winners	Actor	Role(s)	Film	Ref.
1954 (1st)		Dilip Kumar ‡	Shankar	Daag	
1954 (1st)		No Other Nominee			
1955 (2nd)		Bharat Bhushan ‡	Chaitanya Mahaprabhu	Shri Chaitanya Mahaprabhu	
1955 (2nd)		No Other Nominee			
1956 (3rd)		Dilip Kumar ‡	Kumar / Azaad / Abdul Rahim Khan	Azaad	
1956 (3rd)		Bharat Bhushan	Mirza Ghalib	Mirza Ghalib	
1956 (3rd)		Dev Anand	Amar / Raj	Munimji	
1957 (4th)		Dilip Kumar ‡	Devdas Mukherjee	Devdas	
1957 (4th)		Raj Kapoor	Peasant	Jagte Raho	
1958 (5th)		Dilip Kumar ‡	Shankar	Naya Daur	
1958 (5th)		No Other Nominee			
1959 (6th)		Dev Anand ‡	Karan Mehra	Kala Pani	
1959 (6th)		Dilip Kumar	Anand/Deven	Madhumati	
1959 (6th)		Raj Kapoor	Ram Babu	Phir Subah Hogi	
1960 (7th)		Raj Kapoor ‡	Raj Kumar	Anari	
1960 (7th)		Dev Anand	Sunil Kumar	Love Marriage	
1960 (7th)		Dilip Kumar	Ratan Lal	Paigham	

=== 1960s ===
Year	Photos of winners	Actor	Role(s)	Film	Ref.
1961 (8th)		Dilip Kumar ‡	Rajkumar Dhivendra Pratap Bahadur Chandrabhan	Kohinoor	
1961 (8th)		Dev Anand	Raghuvir	Kala Bazar	
1961 (8th)		Dilip Kumar	Prince Salim	Mughal-e-Azam	
1961 (8th)		Raj Kapoor	Chhalia	Chhalia	
1962 (9th)		Raj Kapoor ‡	Raju	Jis Desh Mein Ganga Behti Hai	
1962 (9th)		Dev Anand	Capt. Anand/Major. Manohar Lal Verma	Hum Dono	
1962 (9th)		Dilip Kumar	Gungaram	Gunga Jumna	
1963 (10th)		Ashok Kumar ‡	Raj Kumar	Rakhi	
1963 (10th)		Guru Dutt	Atulya "Bhootnath" Chakraborty	Sahib Bibi Aur Ghulam	
1963 (10th)		Shammi Kapoor	Pritam Khanna	Professor	
1964 (11th)		Sunil Dutt ‡	Thakur Jarnail Singh	Mujhe Jeene Do	
1964 (11th)		Ashok Kumar	Barrister Ashok	Gumrah	
1964 (11th)		Rajendra Kumar	Dr. Dharmesh	Dil Ek Mandir	
1965 (12th)		Dilip Kumar ‡	Vijay Khanna	Leader	
1965 (12th)		Rajendra Kumar	Shyam	Ayee Milan Ki Bela	
1965 (12th)		Raj Kapoor	Lieutenant Sundar Khanna	Sangam	
1966 (13th)		Sunil Dutt ‡	Govind S. Lal	Khandan	
1966 (13th)		Raaj Kumar	Moti	Kaajal	
1966 (13th)		Rajendra Kumar	Gopal; Sarju	Arzoo	
1967 (14th)		Dev Anand ‡	Raju	Guide	
1967 (14th)		Dharmendra	Shakti "Shaaka" Singh	Phool Aur Patthar	
1967 (14th)		Dilip Kumar	Shankar / Rajasahab	Dil Diya Dard Liya	
1968 (15th)		Dilip Kumar ‡	Ram; Shyam	Ram Aur Shyam	
1968 (15th)		Manoj Kumar	Bharat	Upkar	
1968 (15th)		Sunil Dutt	Gopikishan a.k.a. Gopi	Milan	
1969 (16th)		Shammi Kapoor ‡	Brahmachari	Brahmachari	
1969 (16th)		Dilip Kumar	Rajesh Sahab	Aadmi	
1969 (16th)		Dilip Kumar	Kundan S. Prasad	Sunghursh	
1970 (17th)		Ashok Kumar ‡	Shivnath Choudhary a.k.a. Jogi Thakur	Aashirwad	
1970 (17th)		Rajesh Khanna	Arun Prasad Saxena / Suraj Prasad Saxena	Aradhana	
1970 (17th)		Rajesh Khanna	Dilip Roy	Ittefaq	

=== 1970s ===
Year	Photos of winners	Actor	Role(s)	Film	Ref.
1971 (18th)		Rajesh Khanna ‡	Bhola / Ranjit Kumar	Sachaa Jhutha	
1971 (18th)		Dilip Kumar	Gopiram a.k.a. Gopi	Gopi	
1971 (18th)		Sanjeev Kumar	Vijay Kamal Singh	Khilona	
1972 (19th)		Rajesh Khanna ‡	Anand Saigal	Anand	
1972 (19th)		Dharmendra	Ajit	Mera Gaon Mera Desh	
1972 (19th)		Rajesh Khanna	Kamal Sinha	Kati Patang	
1973 (20th)		Manoj Kumar ‡	Mohan	Be-Imaan	
1973 (20th)		Rajesh Khanna	Anand Babu	Amar Prem	
1973 (20th)		Rajesh Khanna	Surjit Singh	Dushman	
1974 (21st)		Rishi Kapoor ‡	Raj Nath	Bobby	
1974 (21st)		Amitabh Bachchan	Inspector Vijay Khanna	Zanjeer	
1974 (21st)		Dharmendra	Shankar	Yaadon Ki Baaraat	
1974 (21st)		Rajesh Khanna	Sunil Kohli	Daag:A Poem of Love	
1974 (21st)		Sanjeev Kumar	Hari Charan Mathur	Koshish	
1975 (22nd)		Rajesh Khanna ‡	Amar	Avishkaar	
1975 (22nd)		Dharmendra	Ajit Singh	Resham Ki Dori	
1975 (22nd)		Dilip Kumar	Sagina	Sagina	
1975 (22nd)		Manoj Kumar	Bharat	Roti Kapda Aur Makaan	
1975 (22nd)		Rajesh Khanna	Chhote Kunwar Karan U. Singh	Prem Nagar	
1976 (23rd)		Sanjeev Kumar ‡	J.K.	Aandhi	
1976 (23rd)		Amitabh Bachchan	Vijay Verma	Deewaar	
1976 (23rd)		Manoj Kumar	Ram Rai	Sanyasi	
1976 (23rd)		Sanjeev Kumar	Thakur Baldev Singh	Sholay	
1976 (23rd)		Uttam Kumar	Madhusudan Roy Chaudhary	Amanush	
1977 (24th)		Sanjeev Kumar ‡	Arjun Pandit	Arjun Pandit	
1977 (24th)		Amitabh Bachchan	Amitabh Malhotra	Kabhi Kabhie	
1977 (24th)		Amol Palekar	Arun Pradeep	Chhoti Si Baat	
1977 (24th)		Dilip Kumar	Kailash / Bholenath	Bairaag	
1977 (24th)		Sanjeev Kumar	Dr. Amarnath Gill	Mausam	
1978 (25th)		Amitabh Bachchan ‡	Anthony Gonzalves	Amar Akbar Anthony	
1978 (25th)		Amitabh Bachchan	Thakur Dharam Chand / Raju	Adaalat	
1978 (25th)		Sanjeev Kumar	Anand Narayan	Yehi Hai Zindagi	
1978 (25th)		Sanjeev Kumar	Raghu Shukla	Zindagi	
1978 (25th)		Vinod Khanna	Vinod Joshi	Shaque	
1979 (26th)		Amitabh Bachchan ‡	Don / Vijay	Don	
1979 (26th)		Amitabh Bachchan	Sikandar	Muqaddar Ka Sikandar	
1979 (26th)		Amitabh Bachchan	Vijay Kumar	Trishul	
1979 (26th)		Sanjeev Kumar	Tony/Tarun Kumar Gupta	Devata	
1979 (26th)		Sanjeev Kumar	Ranjeet Chaddha	Pati Patni Aur Woh	
1980 (27th)		Amol Palekar ‡	Ram Prasad Sharma / Laxman Prasad Sharma	Golmaal	
1980 (27th)		Amitabh Bachchan	Vijay Pal Singh	Kaala Patthar	
1980 (27th)		Amitabh Bachchan	Mr. Natwarlal	Mr. Natwarlal	
1980 (27th)		Rajesh Khanna	Raja / Sonu	Amar Deep	
1980 (27th)		Rishi Kapoor	Raju	Sargam	

=== 1980s ===
Year	Photos of winners	Actor	Role(s)	Film	Ref.
1981 (28th)		Naseeruddin Shah ‡	Bhaskar Kulkarni	Aakrosh	
1981 (28th)		Amitabh Bachchan	Vijay Varma	Dostana	
1981 (28th)		Shatrughan Sinha	Ravi Kapoor	Dostana	
1981 (28th)		Raj Babbar	Ramesh R. Gupta	Insaaf Ka Tarazu	
1981 (28th)		Rajesh Khanna	Arun Kumar Choudhary	Thodisi Bewafaii	
1981 (28th)		Vinod Khanna	Amar	Qurbani	
1982 (29th)		Naseeruddin Shah ‡	Lukka	Chakra	
1982 (29th)		Amitabh Bachchan	Heera	Lawaaris	
1982 (29th)		Amitabh Bachchan	Amit Malhotra	Silsila	
1982 (29th)		Kamal Haasan	S "Vasu" Vasudevan	Ek Duuje Ke Liye	
1982 (29th)		Rajesh Khanna	Deepak Srivastav / Vikas	Dard	
1983 (30th)		Dilip Kumar ‡	DCP Ashwini Kumar	Shakti	
1983 (30th)		Amitabh Bachchan	Dr. Sudhir Roy / Adhir Roy	Bemisal	
1983 (30th)		Amitabh Bachchan	Arjun Singh	Namak Halaal	
1983 (30th)		Amitabh Bachchan	Vijay Kumar	Shakti	
1983 (30th)		Naseeruddin Shah	Salim	Bazaar	
1983 (30th)		Rishi Kapoor	Devdhar a.k.a. Dev	Prem Rog	
1983 (30th)		Sanjeev Kumar	Ashok R. Tilak	Angoor	
1984 (31st)		Naseeruddin Shah ‡	DK Malhotra	Masoom	
1984 (31st)		Kamal Haasan	K. Somprakash a.k.a. Somu	Sadma	
1984 (31st)		Om Puri	Sub Insp. Anant Velankar	Ardh Satya	
1984 (31st)		Rajesh Khanna	Avatar Krishan	Avatar	
1984 (31st)		Sunny Deol	Sunny Kapoor	Betaab	
1985 (32nd)		Anupam Kher ‡	B. V. Pradhan	Saaransh	
1985 (32nd)		Amitabh Bachchan	Vicky Kapoor	Sharaabi	
1985 (32nd)		Dilip Kumar	Vinod Kumar	Mashaal	
1985 (32nd)		Naseeruddin Shah	Anirudh Parmar	Sparsh	
1985 (32nd)		Raj Babbar	Prof. Prabhat Kumar Verma	Aaj Ki Awaaz	
1986 (33rd)		Kamal Haasan ‡	Raja	Saagar	
1986 (33rd)		Amitabh Bachchan	Raju Singh	Mard	
1986 (33rd)		Anil Kapoor	Arun Verma	Meri Jung	
1986 (33rd)		Kumar Gaurav	Rahul	Janam	
1986 (33rd)		Rishi Kapoor	Dawood Mohd. Ali Khan Yousufzai	Tawaif	
1987	NO CEREMONY				
1988	NO CEREMONY				
1989 (34th)		Anil Kapoor ‡	Mahesh "Munna" Deshmukh	Tezaab	
1989 (34th)		Aamir Khan	Raj	Qayamat Se Qayamat Tak	
1989 (34th)		Amitabh Bachchan	Vijay Kumar Srivastav a.k.a. Shahenshah	Shehenshah	
1990 (35th)		Jackie Shroff ‡	Kishan	Parinda	
1990 (35th)		Aamir Khan	Amir Hussein	Raakh	
1990 (35th)		Anil Kapoor	Eeshwar Chand Vishnunath Brahmanand	Eeshwar	
1990 (35th)		Rishi Kapoor	Rohit Gupta	Chandni	
1990 (35th)		Salman Khan	Prem Choudhary	Maine Pyaar Kiya	

=== 1990s ===
Year	Photos of winners	Actor	Role(s)	Film	Ref.
1991 (36th)		Sunny Deol ‡	Ajay Mehra	Ghayal	
1991 (36th)		Aamir Khan	Raja	Dil	
1991 (36th)		Amitabh Bachchan	Vijay Deenanath Chauhan	Agneepath	
1991 (36th)		Chiranjeevi	Siddhanth	Pratibandh	
1992 (37th)		Amitabh Bachchan ‡	Shekhar Malhotra alias Tiger	Hum	
1992 (37th)		Aamir Khan	Raghu Jeitley	Dil Hai Ke Manta Nahin	
1992 (37th)		Anil Kapoor	Virendra Pratap Singh	Lamhe	
1992 (37th)		Dilip Kumar	Veeru Singh	Saudagar	
1992 (37th)		Sanjay Dutt	Aman Verma	Saajan	
1993 (38th)		Anil Kapoor ‡	Raju	Beta	
1993 (38th)		Aamir Khan	Sanjaylal Sharma	Jo Jeeta Wohi Sikandar	
1993 (38th)		Amitabh Bachchan	Baadshah Khan	Khuda Gawah	
1994 (39th)		Shah Rukh Khan ‡	Ajay Sharma alias Vicky Malhotra	Baazigar	
1994 (39th)		Aamir Khan	Rahul Malhotra	Hum Hain Rahi Pyaar Ke	
1994 (39th)		Govinda	Bunnu / Gulshan / Gaurishankar	Aankhen	
1994 (39th)		Jackie Shroff	Shiva P. Sathe	Gardish	
1994 (39th)		Sanjay Dutt	Ballu/Balram	Khalnayak	
1995 (40th)		Nana Patekar ‡	Pratap Narayan Tilak	Krantiveer	
1995 (40th)		Aamir Khan	Amar Manohar	Andaz Apna Apna	
1995 (40th)		Akshay Kumar	Vijay Saigal	Yeh Dillagi	
1995 (40th)		Anil Kapoor	Narendra Singh	1942: A Love Story	
1995 (40th)		Salman Khan	Prem	Hum Aapke Hain Koun..!	
1996 (41st)		Shah Rukh Khan ‡	Raj Malhotra	Dilwale Dulhania Le Jayenge	
1996 (41st)		Aamir Khan	Munna	Rangeela	
1996 (41st)		Ajay Devgan	Jay Bakshi	Naajayaz	
1996 (41st)		Govinda	Raju	Coolie No. 1	
1996 (41st)		Salman Khan	Karan Singh	Karan Arjun	
1997 (42nd)		Aamir Khan ‡	Raja Hindustani	Raja Hindustani	
1997 (42nd)		Sunny Deol	Kashi Nath	Ghatak	
1997 (42nd)		Govinda	Shyamsundar	Saajan Chale Sasural	
1997 (42nd)		Nana Patekar	Vishwanath	Agni Sakshi	
1997 (42nd)		Nana Patekar	Joseph Braganza	Khamoshi	
1998 (43rd)		Shah Rukh Khan ‡	Rahul	Dil To Pagal Hai	
1998 (43rd)		Sunny Deol	Major Kuldip Singh Chandpuri	Border	
1998 (43rd)		Anil Kapoor	Shakti Thakur	Virasat	
1998 (43rd)		Govinda	Bunnu	Deewana Mastana	
1998 (43rd)		Kamal Haasan	Jaiprakash Paswan alias Laxmi Godbole	Chachi 420	
1998 (43rd)		Shah Rukh Khan	Rahul Joshi	Yes Boss	
1999 (44th)		Shah Rukh Khan ‡	Rahul Khanna	Kuch Kuch Hota Hai	
1999 (44th)		Aamir Khan	Siddharth Marathe	Ghulam	
1999 (44th)		Ajay Devgan	Ajay R. Desai	Zakhm	
1999 (44th)		Govinda	Pyare Mohan a.k.a. Chote Miyan	Bade Miyan Chote Miyan	
1999 (44th)		Salman Khan	Suraj Khanna	Pyaar Kiya To Darna Kya	
2000 (45th)		Sanjay Dutt ‡	Raghunath "Raghu" Namdev Shivalkar	Vaastav	
2000 (45th)		Aamir Khan	Ajay Singh Rathore	Sarfarosh	
2000 (45th)		Ajay Devgan	Vanraj	Hum Dil De Chuke Sanam	
2000 (45th)		Salman Khan	Sameer Rossellini	Hum Dil De Chuke Sanam	
2000 (45th)		Manoj Bajpayee	Samar Pratap Singh	Shool	

=== 2000s ===
Year	Photos of winners	Actor	Role(s)	Film	Ref.
2001 (46th)		Hrithik Roshan ‡	Rohit / Raj Chopra	Kaho Naa... Pyaar Hai	
2001 (46th)		Anil Kapoor	Major Jaidev Rajvansh	Pukaar	
2001 (46th)		Hrithik Roshan	Amaan Ikramullah	Fiza	
2001 (46th)		Sanjay Dutt	SSP Inayat Khan	Mission Kashmir	
2001 (46th)		Shah Rukh Khan	Raj Aryan Malhotra	Mohabbatein	
2002 (47th)		Aamir Khan ‡	Bhuvan Latha	Lagaan	
2002 (47th)		Sunny Deol	Tara Singh	Gadar: Ek Prem Katha	
2002 (47th)		Aamir Khan	Akash Malhotra	Dil Chahta Hai	
2002 (47th)		Amitabh Bachchan	Manu Verma	Aks	
2002 (47th)		Shah Rukh Khan	Rahul Y. Raichand	Kabhi Khushi Kabhie Gham	
2003 (48th)		Shah Rukh Khan ‡	Devdas Mukherjee	Devdas	
2003 (48th)		Ajay Devgan	Bhagat Singh	The Legend of Bhagat Singh	
2003 (48th)		Amitabh Bachchan	Yashvardhan "Major" Rampal	Kaante	
2003 (48th)		Bobby Deol	Raj Singhania	Humraaz	
2003 (48th)		Vivek Oberoi	Aditya Sehgal	Saathiya	
2004 (49th)		Hrithik Roshan ‡	Rohit Mehra	Koi Mil Gaya	
2004 (49th)		Ajay Devgan	Amit Kumar	Gangaajal	
2004 (49th)		Amitabh Bachchan	Raj Malhotra	Baghban	
2004 (49th)		Akshay Kumar	Raj Malhotra	Andaaz	
2004 (49th)		Salman Khan	Radhe Mohan	Tere Naam	
2004 (49th)		Shah Rukh Khan	Aman Mathur	Kal Ho Naa Ho	
2005 (50th)		Shah Rukh Khan ‡	Mohan Bhargav	Swades	
2005 (50th)		Amitabh Bachchan	DCP Anant Kumar Shrivastav	Khakee	
2005 (50th)		Hrithik Roshan	Karan Shergill	Lakshya	
2005 (50th)		Saif Ali Khan	Karan Kapoor	Hum Tum	
2005 (50th)		Shah Rukh Khan	Major Ram Prasad Sharma	Main Hoon Na	
2005 (50th)		Shah Rukh Khan	Squadron Leader Veer Pratap Singh	Veer-Zaara	
2006 (51st)		Amitabh Bachchan ‡	Debraj Sahai	Black	
2006 (51st)		Aamir Khan	Mangal Pandey	Mangal Pandey: The Rising	
2006 (51st)		Amitabh Bachchan	Subhash Nagre a.k.a. Sarkar	Sarkar	
2006 (51st)		Abhishek Bachchan	Rakesh Trivedi alias Bunty	Bunty Aur Babli	
2006 (51st)		Saif Ali Khan	Shekhar Roy	Parineeta	
2007 (52nd)		Hrithik Roshan ‡	Aryan alias Mr. A	Dhoom 2	
2007 (52nd)		Aamir Khan	Daljeet "DJ" Singh / Chandra Shekhar Azad	Rang De Basanti	
2007 (52nd)		Hrithik Roshan	Krishna "Krrish" Mehra	Krrish	
2007 (52nd)		Sanjay Dutt	Munna Bhai / Murali Prasad Sharma	Lage Raho Munna Bhai	
2007 (52nd)		Shah Rukh Khan	Don / Vijay	Don	
2007 (52nd)		Shah Rukh Khan	Dev Saran	Kabhi Alvida Naa Kehna	
2008 (53rd)		Shah Rukh Khan ‡	Coach Kabir Khan	Chak De India	
2008 (53rd)		Abhishek Bachchan	Gurukant "Guru" Desai	Guru	
2008 (53rd)		Akshay Kumar	Arjun Singh	Namastey London	
2008 (53rd)		Darsheel Safary	Ishaan Awasthi	Taare Zameen Par	
2008 (53rd)		Shahid Kapoor	Aditya Kashyap	Jab We Met	
2008 (53rd)		Shah Rukh Khan	Om Prakash Makhija / Om Kapoor	Om Shanti Om	
2009 (54th)		Hrithik Roshan ‡	Jalauddin Muhammad Akbar	Jodhaa Akbar	
2009 (54th)		Aamir Khan	Sanjay Singhania	Ghajini	
2009 (54th)		Abhishek Bachchan	Sameer "Sam" Kapoor	Dostana	
2009 (54th)		Akshay Kumar	Happy Singh	Singh Is Kinng	
2009 (54th)		Naseeruddin Shah	The Common Man	A Wednesday	
2009 (54th)		Shah Rukh Khan	Surinder "Suri" Sahni	Rab Ne Bana Di Jodi	
2010 (55th)		Amitabh Bachchan ‡	Auro	Paa	
2010 (55th)		Aamir Khan	Ranchoddas "Rancho" Shamaldas Chanchad / Chhote / Phunsukh Wangdu	3 Idiots	
2010 (55th)		Ranbir Kapoor	Prem Shankar Sharma	Ajab Prem Ki Ghazab Kahani	
2010 (55th)		Ranbir Kapoor	Siddharth Mehra	Wake Up Sid	
2010 (55th)		Saif Ali Khan	Jai Vardhan Singh / Young Veer Singh	Love Aaj Kal	
2010 (55th)		Shahid Kapoor	Charlie / Guddu	Kaminey	

=== 2010s ===
Year	Photos of winners	Actor	Role(s)	Film	Ref.
2011 (56th)		Shah Rukh Khan ‡	Rizwan Khan	My Name Is Khan	
2011 (56th)		Ajay Devgn	Sultan Mirza	Once Upon a Time in Mumbai	
2011 (56th)		Hrithik Roshan	Ethan Mascarenhas	Guzaarish	
2011 (56th)		Ranbir Kapoor	Samar Pratap Singh	Raajneeti	
2011 (56th)		Salman Khan	Chulbul Pandey	Dabangg	
2012 (57th)		Ranbir Kapoor ‡	Janardhan "Jordan" Jakhar	Rockstar	
2012 (57th)		Ajay Devgn	Bajirao Singham	Singham	
2012 (57th)		Amitabh Bachchan	Prabhakar Anand	Aarakshan	
2012 (57th)		Hrithik Roshan	Arjun Narula	Zindagi Na Milegi Dobara	
2012 (57th)		Salman Khan	Lovely Singh	Bodyguard	
2012 (57th)		Shah Rukh Khan	Don	Don 2	
2013 (58th)		Ranbir Kapoor ‡	Barfi	Barfi	
2013 (58th)		Hrithik Roshan	Vijay Deenanath Chauhan	Agneepath	
2013 (58th)		Irrfan Khan	Paan Singh Tomar	Paan Singh Tomar	
2013 (58th)		Manoj Bajpayee	Sardar Khan	Gangs of Wasseypur Part I	
2013 (58th)		Salman Khan	Chulbul Pandey	Dabangg 2	
2013 (58th)		Shah Rukh Khan	Major Samar Anand	Jab Tak Hai Jaan	
2014 (59th)		Farhan Akhtar ‡	Milkha Singh	Bhaag Milkha Bhaag	
2014 (59th)		Dhanush	Kundan Shankar	Raanjhanaa	
2014 (59th)		Hrithik Roshan	Rohit Mehra / Krishna Mehra	Krrish 3	
2014 (59th)		Ranbir Kapoor	Kabir "Bunny" Thapar	Yeh Jawaani Hai Deewani	
2014 (59th)		Ranveer Singh	Ram Rajari	Ram Leela	
2014 (59th)		Shah Rukh Khan	Rahul Mithaiwala	Chennai Express	
2015 (60th)		Shahid Kapoor ‡	Haider Meer	Haider	
2015 (60th)		Aamir Khan	PK	PK	
2015 (60th)		Akshay Kumar	Virat Bakshi	Holiday	
2015 (60th)		Hrithik Roshan	Jai Nanda / Rajveer	Bang Bang	
2015 (60th)		Randeep Hooda	Raja Ravi Varma	Rang Rasiya	
2016 61st)		Ranveer Singh ‡	Peshwa Bajirao	Bajirao Mastani	
2016 61st)		Amitabh Bachchan	Bhaskor Banerjee	Piku	
2016 61st)		Ranbir Kapoor	Ved Vardhan Sahni	Tamasha	
2016 61st)		Salman Khan	Pawan Kumar Chaturvedi	Bajrangi Bhaijaan	
2016 61st)		Shah Rukh Khan	Raj Randhir Bakshi a.k.a. Kaali	Dilwale	
2016 61st)		Varun Dhawan	Raghav "Raghu" Pratap Singh	Badlapur	
2017 (62nd)		Aamir Khan ‡	Mahavir Singh Phogat	Dangal	
2017 (62nd)		Amitabh Bachchan	Deepak Sehgal	Pink	
2017 (62nd)		Ranbir Kapoor	Ayan Sanger	Ae Dil Hai Mushkil	
2017 (62nd)		Salman Khan	Sultan Ali Khan	Sultan	
2017 (62nd)		Shahid Kapoor	Tejinder "Tommy" Singh a.k.a. Gabru	Udta Punjab	
2017 (62nd)		Shah Rukh Khan	Gaurav Chandna / Aryan Khanna	Fan	
2017 (62nd)		Sushant Singh Rajput	Mahendra Singh Dhoni	M.S. Dhoni: The Untold Story	
2018 (63rd)		Irrfan Khan ‡	Mr. Raj Batra	Hindi Medium	
2018 (63rd)		Akshay Kumar	Keshav Sharma	Toilet: Ek Prem Katha	
2018 (63rd)		Ayushmann Khurrana	Mudit Sharma	Shubh Mangal Saavdhan	
2018 (63rd)		Hrithik Roshan	Rohan Bhatnagar	Kaabil	
2018 (63rd)		Shah Rukh Khan	Raees Alam	Raees	
2018 (63rd)		Varun Dhawan	Badrinath "Badri" Bansal	Badrinath Ki Dulhania	
2019 (64th)		Ranbir Kapoor ‡	Sanjay Dutt	Sanju	
2019 (64th)		Akshay Kumar	Lakshmikant Chauhan	Padman	
2019 (64th)		Ayushmann Khurrana	Akash	Andhadhun	
2019 (64th)		Rajkummar Rao	Vicky	Stree	
2019 (64th)		Ranveer Singh	Alauddin Khilji	Padmaavat	
2019 (64th)		Shah Rukh Khan	Bauua Singh	Zero	
2020 (65th)		Ranveer Singh ‡	Murad Ahmed	Gully Boy	
2020 (65th)		Akshay Kumar	Havildar Ishar Singh	Kesari	
2020 (65th)		Ayushmann Khurrana	Balmukund "Bala" Shukla	Bala	
2020 (65th)		Hrithik Roshan	Anand Kumar	Super 30	
2020 (65th)		Shahid Kapoor	Kabir Singh	Kabir Singh	
2020 (65th)		Vicky Kaushal	Major Vihaan Singh Shergill	Uri: The Surgical Strike	

=== 2020s ===
Year	Photos of winners	Actor	Role(s)	Film	Ref.
2021 (66th)		Irrfan Khan † (posthumous)	Champak Ghasiteram Bansal	Angrezi Medium	
2021 (66th)		Ajay Devgn	Tanaji Malusare	Tanhaji	
2021 (66th)		Amitabh Bachchan	Chunnan "Mirza" Nawab	Gulabo Sitabo	
2021 (66th)		Ayushmann Khurrana	Kartik Singh	Shubh Mangal Zyada Saavdhan	
2021 (66th)		Rajkummar Rao	Alok "Alu" Kumar Gupta	Ludo	
2021 (66th)		Sushant Singh Rajput (posthumous)	Immanuel "Manny" Rajkumar Junior	Dil Bechara	
2022 (67th)		Ranveer Singh ‡	Kapil Dev	83	
2022 (67th)		Dhanush	S. Venkatesh Vishwanath 'Vishu' Iyer	Atrangi Re	
2022 (67th)		Sidharth Malhotra	Vikram Batra	Shershaah	
2022 (67th)		Vicky Kaushal	Udham Singh	Sardar Udham	
2023 (68th)		Rajkummar Rao ‡	Shardul Thakur	Badhaai Do	
2023 (68th)		Ajay Devgn	Vijay Salgaonkar	Drishyam 2	
2023 (68th)		Amitabh Bachchan	Amit Srivastava	Uunchai	
2023 (68th)		Anupam Kher	Pushkar Nath Pandit	The Kashmir Files	
2023 (68th)		Hrithik Roshan	Vedha Betal	Vikram Vedha	
2023 (68th)		Kartik Aaryan	Ruhaan Randhawa "Rooh Baba"	Bhool Bhulaiyaa 2	
2024 (69th)		Ranbir Kapoor ‡	Ranvijay Singh Balbir/Aziz Haque	Animal	
2024 (69th)		Sunny Deol	Tara Singh	Gadar 2	
2024 (69th)		Vicky Kaushal	Sam Maneckshaw	Sam Bahadur	
2024 (69th)		Shah Rukh Khan	Hardayal "Hardy" Singh Dhillon	Dunki	
2024 (69th)		Shah Rukh Khan	Captain Vikram Rathore/ Azad Rathore	Jawan	
2024 (69th)		Ranveer Singh	Rocky Randhawa	Rocky Aur Rani Kii Prem Kahaani	
2025 (70th)		Kartik Aaryan ‡	Murlikant Petkar	Chandu Champion	
2025 (70th)		Abhishek Bachchan ‡	Arjun Sen	I Want to Talk	
2025 (70th)		Ajay Devgn	Syed Abdul Rahim	Maidaan	
2025 (70th)		Akshay Kumar	Vir Jagannath Mhatre	Sarfira	
2025 (70th)		Hrithik Roshan	Shamsher "Patty" Pathania	Fighter	
2025 (70th)		Rajkumar Rao	Vicky	Stree 2	

== See also ==
- Cinema of India
- Filmfare Best Actress Award
- Filmfare Awards East
- Filmfare Awards South
- Filmfare Marathi Awards
