= Shaandaar (1974 film) =

1974 film by Krishnan–Panju

- Poster
- Directed by: Krishnan–Panju
- Story by: G. Balasubramaniam
- Based on: Kasturi Nivasa
- Produced by: K. V. V. Arthanari Chettiar
- Dialogue by: Rajinder Krishan
- Starring: Sanjeev Kumar; Sharmila Tagore; Vinod Mehra
- Cinematography: S. Maruti Rao
- Music by: Laxmikant–Pyarelal
- Production company: A.V.A. Cine Corporation
- Release date: 22 September 1974
- Running time: 156 minutes
- Country: India
- Language: Hindi

Shaandaar (transl. Resplendent) is a 1974 Indian Hindi-language drama film directed by Krishnan–Panju. The film stars Sanjeev Kumar, Sharmila Tagore, and Vinod Mehra. A remake of the 1971 Kannada film Kasturi Nivasa, it focuses on Rajan, who incurs losses as Chander, a man he helped, prospers. The film was released on 22 September 1974.

== Plot ==
Rajan, the owner of a matchbox factory called "Dove", lives in a huge house named Laxmi Bhavan. (Thus, he has a pet Dove) Rajan is a widower. Recognising that his honest employee Chander is in a similar position, he decides to help Chander financially. As Chander attends training in the U.S., Rajan suggests his secretary, Pratima, whom he has a crush on, look after Chander’s daughter Rani. Rani starts to believe Pratima to be her mother which lead to Pratima and Chander marrying, making Rajan disheartened as he wanted to marry her.

Chander suggests changing the company's structure. The traditionalist Rajan becomes infuriated. Protesting this, Chander resigns and starts his own matchbox company, Eagle, becoming the leading matchbox manufacturer. This begins Rajan's downfall, as his charity and donating activities eat up profits, leading him to put his house up for sale. Chander calls for the highest bid and wants to give it back to Rajan, but being the man that he is, Rajan does not accept. Thus, Chander and Pratima move to Laxmi Bhavan. Later, Pratima gives birth to Munna. Munna likes playing with Rajan's dove.

Due to Rajan's loss, Pratima shows her sympathy to him, much to Chander's dismay which leads him to become addicted to drugs. He starts drinking alcohol and thus join lavish parties. Meanwhile, Rani falls off the staircase and dies making Rajan crestfallen. Later, Munna becomes sick, and wants to play with Rajan's dove. Thus, Pratima requests for the dove (But Rajan sold the dove for feeding Pratima when she comes to his house). Rajan fails to confess the former and breathes his last.

== Cast ==
- Sanjeev Kumar as Rajan
- Sharmila Tagore as Pratima
- Vinod Mehra as Chander
- Aruna Irani as Chandni
- Alka as Shanta
- Jagdeep as Tolaram

== Production ==
After the success of the 1971 Kannada film Kasturi Nivasa, the Hindi remake rights were sold for ₹400,000 (equivalent to ₹12 million or US$130,000 in 2023). The remake, titled Shaandaar, was produced by K. V. V. Arthanari Chettiar of A.V.A. Cine Corporation, with Krishnan–Panju directing. Cinematography was handled by S. Maruti Rao, and the dialogues were written by Rajinder Krishan.

== Themes ==
The film stresses the principle that "life is to give—not to take".

== Soundtrack ==
The soundtrack was composed by Laxmikant–Pyarelal, while the songs are written by Rajendra Krishan. The Christmas-themed number, "Aata Hai Aata Hai Santaclauz", attained popularity.

Track listing
No.	Title	Singer(s)	Length
1.	"Itni Badi Duniya Mein"	Kishore Kumar, Asha Bhosle	6:12
2.	"Zindagi Ab Tere Naam Se Dar Lagta"	Mohammed Rafi	4:12
3.	"Jhumka Bola Kajre Se"	Asha Bhosle	4:17
4.	"Aata Hai Aata Hai Santaclauz"	Kishore Kumar	4:23
5.	"Main Aesa Ek Khilona"	Mohammed Rafi	4:29
6.	"Saqi Bhar De Jaam"	Mahendra Kapoor	5:26
Total length:			28:59

== Release ==
Shaandaar was released on 22 September 1974, and failed to match the success of the original.
