= Koshish =

1972 film

- Film poster
- Directed by: Gulzar
- Written by: Gulzar
- Produced by: Romu N. Sippy; Raj N. Sippy
- Starring: Sanjeev Kumar; Jaya Bhaduri
- Cinematography: K Vaikunth
- Edited by: Waman B. Bhosle; Gurudutt Shirali
- Music by: Madan Mohan
- Release date: 13 October 1972
- Running time: 125 minutes
- Country: India
- Language: Hindi

Koshish (transl. Effort) is a 1972 Indian Hindi-language romantic drama film starring Sanjeev Kumar and Jaya Bhaduri, written and directed by Gulzar.

The film depicts a deaf and mute couple and their conflicts, pain and struggle to carve out a niche for themselves in a desensitized society. It was inspired by the 1961 Japanese film Happiness of Us Alone. The film was remade in Tamil in 1977 as Uyarndhavargal starring Kamal Haasan and Sujatha.

== Plot ==
Haricharan and Aarti are poor youngsters who are deaf and mute. They fall in love with each other and get married. Haricharan works as a newspaper delivery agent to earn a living. Later, they have a child, but the child dies because of a greedy uncle named Kanu. The couple is devastated, and can only get work of a shoe shine man, and later are blessed with a second child and they lead a happy life. One day, a police officer sees Haricharan, gets impressed by his kind and honest nature, he gives him a job. Soon, Haricharan earns more and their financial condition improves. Their son grows up.

Years later, Aarti dies. Haricharan is employed in a company. His employer's daughter is deaf and mute and the employer wants to fix Haricharan's son's wedding with his daughter. Haricharan declines as his employer is richer than him but the employer convinces him. Seeing the daughter, Haricharan is reminded of Aarti and agrees for the wedding. The son opposes the wedding as she is deaf and mute, much to Haricharan's distress. He berates him, and reminds him that even his mother was mute. The son realises his mistake and agrees to marry the employer's daughter.

== Cast ==
- Sanjeev Kumar as Haricharan Mathur "Hari"
- Jaya Bhaduri as Aarti Mathur
- Om Shivpuri as blind 'Uncle Narayan'
- Asrani as Kanu
- Dina Pathak as Durga
- Seema Deo as Teacher
- Yash Sharma as bicycle storage keeper
- Rehana as Bulbul
- Amit Mathur as Atam Prakash
- Moolchand as Second man who answered the phone
- Dilip Kumar as Himself - victim of silent call (Guest appearance)

== Music ==
Song	Singer
"Soja Baba Mere Soja"	Mohammed Rafi
"Humse Hai Watan Hamara"	Sushma Shreshta

== Awards and nominations ==
Year	Award	Category	Recipient	Result
1973	National Film Awards	Best Screenplay	Gulzar	Won
1973	National Film Awards	Best Actor	Sanjeev Kumar	Won
1974	BFJA Awards	Best Actor (Hindi)	Sanjeev Kumar	Won
1974	Filmfare Awards	Best Film	Romu N. Sippy and Raj N. Sippy	Nominated
1974	Filmfare Awards	Best Director	Gulzar	Nominated
1974	Filmfare Awards	Best Story	Gulzar	Nominated
1974	Filmfare Awards	Best Actor	Sanjeev Kumar	Nominated
1974	Filmfare Awards	Best Actress	Jaya Bhaduri	Nominated
