= Naya Din Nai Raat =

- Directed by: A. Bhimsingh
- Written by: A. P. Nagarajan (Story); A. Bhimsingh (Screenplay); Rajendra Krishan (Dialogue)
- Based on: Navarathri by A. P. Nagarajan
- Produced by: N. P. Ali
- Starring: Sanjeev Kumar; Jaya Bhaduri
- Cinematography: G. Vittal Rao
- Edited by: A. Paul Durai Singham
- Music by: Laxmikant–Pyarelal
- Release date: May 10, 1974
- Running time: 2 hours 12 min
- Country: India
- Language: Hindi

Naya Din Nai Raat (transl. New Day, New Night) is a 1974 Indian Hindi-language drama film directed by A. Bhimsingh. The film is a remake of 1964 Tamil movie Navarathri. The film stars Sanjeev Kumar in nine roles. It raised his status and reputation as an actor in Hindi cinema. The nine roles played by Kumar correspond to the navarasa (nine rasas).

== Plot ==
Sushma believes that she is too young to get married. But when her father, Lalla Banarsilal, insists on her wedding, she runs away from home. Her adventures take her to a lonely wealthy widower with a cute daughter named Guddi; a drunken lout in a brothel; Dr. Kruparam, a psychiatrist, who admits her in his mental hospital; a dreaded bandit who has killed his tormentor, cut him into pieces and fed them to birds, and who still is on a killing spree; Pandit Gorakhnath who lives a double life - as a priest and as a smuggler; a leper Dhanraj, who once was a very wealthy man, but is now shunned by everyone; a transvestite stage actor; and a hunter who saves Sushma's life by shooting dead a man-eating lion.

As things spiral out of control for Sushma, there is yet one more male she has to meet, and it is this meeting that will change her life further.

== Cast ==
- Sanjeev Kumar as Anand/Swami Rahasyanand/Mr. Sarang/Seth Dhanraj/Sher Singh/Phoolkumar/Four Other Roles
- Jaya Bhaduri as Sushma
- Nazneen
- Farida Jalal
- Om Prakash as Lala Banarsilal
- David as Seth Ram Shankar
- Shyama as Brothel Madam
- Lalita Pawar
- Tun Tun
- Manorama

== Soundtrack ==
All songs were penned by Rajendra Krishan.

Song	Singer
"Krishna Krishna, Bolo Krishna, Radhe Radhe"	Kishore Kumar, Lata Mangeshkar
"Didi, Teri Shaadi Dekhna"	Lata Mangeshkar
"Ek Paheli Tum Se Poochhun"	Lata Mangeshkar
"Main Wohi, Wohi Baat"	Mohammed Rafi
"Sanam Na Jao Abhi"	Asha Bhosle

== Production ==
The lead role was initially offered to Dilip Kumar but he declined the role and suggested Sanjeev Kumar's name. His suggestion was taken and the role went to him.
