= Yehi Hai Zindagi =

1977 film by K. S. Sethumadhavan

- Poster
- Directed by: K. S. Sethumadhavan
- Written by: Inder Raj Anand; Raj Baldev Raj
- Story by: Vaali
- Produced by: B. Nagi Reddy
- Starring: Sanjeev Kumar; Utpal Dutt
- Cinematography: Marcus Bartley
- Edited by: M. S. Mani
- Music by: Rajesh Roshan
- Production company: Vijaya Productions
- Release date: 10 March 1977
- Country: India
- Language: Hindi

Yehi Hai Zindagi (transl. This is life) is a 1977 Hindi-language film. Produced by B. Nagi Reddy, it is directed by K. S. Sethumadhavan. The film stars Sanjeev Kumar, Seema Deo, Utpal Dutt, Lucky Ali, Ramesh Deo and Neeta Mehta. The film's music was composed by Rajesh Roshan. It is a remake of the Tamil film Kaliyuga Kannan (1974).

== Plot ==
Anand Narayan comes from a poor family, which consists of his wife, Gayetri, daughter, Kamla, and two sons Madhu and Govind. Through hard work, disappointed with poor status Anand comes in contact with Lord Krishna face to face when he steals fifty rupees kept for donation by his wife, to pay for crossword competition. Anand complaints to the God about his partial treatment to someone rich and others remaining poor for their no fault. He works with Nekiram, who later on also becomes his business partner, and also his samdhi (in-law) as his daughter is in love with Madhu. Both get married in a simple ceremony. Both Nekiram, and Anand and his family work hard at preparing food in a small sweet shop. After Lord Krishna appears to Anand who asks the Lord for material success, Anands wins the crossword prize, becomes rich and purchases the same Dhaba which now grows into a restaurant, then a larger fancier restaurant, finally a five star hotel. Now Anand and his family are all wealthy and live in a palatial home. Bhagwan Shri Krishna regularly visits him and asks about him and his family. Anand proudly takes all the credit, and asks Krishna to accompany him to see his success and his hotel. Bhagwan Krishna declines, but agrees do so later. Things don't go quite as well for Anand, when he finds out that Lakiram has been cheating him. Lakiram leaves the house, but Madhu accompanies him. Then Anand finds that Govind has been squandering money and time on women and alcohol; and to top his disappointments, Kamla gets pregnant. When Bhagwan Krishna comes to visit Anand again, he admits that he is a failure, his health is poor, and his family are all strangers to him. Lord Krishna advises Anand that this is his life and he must learn from the Mahabharata, and that every life is a struggle, which is confused by relations and near and dear ones, and also by one's ego. Once the ego is removed, then only one can see clearly.

== Cast ==
- Sanjeev Kumar as Anand Narayan
- Vikram Gokhale as Lord Krishna
- Utpal Dutt as Nekiram
- Seema Deo as Mrs. Gayatri Narayan
- Neeta Mehta as Radha
- David Abraham as Kader
- Romesh Sharma as Madhu Narayan
- Ramesh Deo as Michael
- Lucky Ali as Dinesh
- Tamanna as Kamla

== Soundtrack ==
#	Title	Singer(s)
1	"Pyar Ka Badla"	Kishore Kumar
2	"Dilruba Aa Meri Bahon Mein"	Kishore Kumar, Lata Mangeshkar
3	"Hum Mil Gaye"	Mohammed Rafi, Lata Mangeshkar
4	"Kali Kali Kaise Kate Raat"	Asha Bhosle

== Reception ==
At the 25th Filmfare Awards, Sanjeev Kumar was nominated for Best Actor, but lost to Amitabh Bachchan for Amar Akbar Anthony.
