= Do Ladkiyan =

- Directed by: Kotayya Pratyagatma
- Produced by: Gope Dadlani
- Starring: Sanjeev Kumar; Mala Sinha; Tarun Bose
- Music by: Laxmikant–Pyarelal
- Release date: 3 February 1976
- Country: India
- Language: Hindi

Do Ladkiyan is a 1976 Bollywood film directed by Kotayya Pratyagatma.

== Cast ==
- Sanjeev Kumar as Avinash
- Mala Sinha as Geeta/Sujata
- Tarun Bose as Rai Bahadue Raghunath Khanna
- Ramesh Deo as Ramesh
- Jagdeep as Ganeshi
- Jankidas as Lala Laluram
- Sulochana Latkar as Jankidevi
- Mehmood Jr as Mithu
- Asit Sen as Sethji
- Joginder Shelly as Raghunath's friend
- Tun Tun
- Jayshree T. as Item number

== Soundtrack ==
#	Song	Singer
1	"Talash Hai Ek Ladki Ki"	Kishore Kumar
2	"Thaamke Jhoole Ki Dori"	Lata Mangeshkar
3	"Bijuriya Chamke"	Lata Mangeshkar, Mohammed Rafi
4	"Gulshan Gulshan Pyar Ki Baaten"	Lata Mangeshkar, Mohammed Rafi
5	"Is Dil Men Reh Chuke Hai Woh"	Mohammed Rafi
