= Sachaai =

- Poster
- Directed by: K. Shankar
- Screenplay by: K. Shankar
- Produced by: M. C. Ramamurthy
- Starring: Shammi Kapoor; Sanjeev Kumar; Sadhana
- Cinematography: Sudhin Majumdar
- Edited by: K. Sankunny
- Music by: Shankar-Jaikishan
- Release date: 1969
- Country: India
- Language: Hindi

Sachaai (lit. 'Truth') is a 1969 Hindi film starring Shammi Kapoor and Sanjeev Kumar as friends with opposing ideologies. It was the first of their many collaborations. Directed by K. Shankar, the film introduced the use of musical instruments unique to Tamil Nadu in Bollywood cinema.

The film also stars Sadhana, with Pran, Johnny Walker, and the dancer Helen in other important roles. This is remake of Tamil film Pandhayam.

== Plot ==
Ashok and Kishore are roommates, living in a hostel. While Ashok takes to crime and dishonesty, Kishore is honest to a fault. When Kishore finds that his father has been taking bribes, he leaves home angrily. Ashok and he disagree on a number of issues, mainly involving honesty, and both agree to meet each other after a period of three years, and see what life has had an effect for them. Kishore gets into bad company inadvertently, and is unable to free himself, and gets deeper and deeper into crime. Meanwhile, Ashok realizes it is not worthwhile to pursue a criminal career, and becomes a police inspector. Kishore is now known as the notorious Baghi Sitara, and Ashok is assigned the task of apprehending him. The two are unaware of each other's identity. Kishore learns of this assignment and his men kidnap Ashok, but Ashok manages to escape. Kishore must kill Ashok in order to carry out his nefarious activities. After three years, the two have an emotional meeting, delighted to see other.

== Cast ==
- Shammi Kapoor as Ashok
- Sanjeev Kumar as Kishore
- Sadhana as Shobha
- Pran as Prakash
- Johnny Walker as Chaman
- Helen as Meena
- Raj Mehra as Dindayal
- Anwar Hussain as Madan
- Sulochana Latkar as Mrs. Dindayal
- Dhumal as Hostel Warden

== Soundtrack ==
All lyrics written by Rajendra Krishan.

| Song | Singer |
|---|---|
| "Mere Gunaah Maaf Kar" | Mohammed Rafi |
| "Ae Dost Mere Maine Duniya Dekhi Hai" | Mohammed Rafi, Manna Dey |
| "Sau Baras Ke Zindagi Se Achchhe Hai" | Mohammed Rafi, Asha Bhosle |
| "Kab Se Dhari Hai Samne Botal Sharab Ki" | Mohammed Rafi, Asha Bhosle |
| "More Saiyan Pakde" | Asha Bhosle |
| "Beet Chali Haye Ram" | Asha Bhosle |
