= Kaliyuga Kannan =

1974 film by Krishnan–Panju

- Theatrical release poster
- Directed by: Krishnan–Panju
- Written by: Vaali
- Based on: Sri Krishna Vijayam by Vaali
- Produced by: N. Elango
- Starring: Sowcar Janaki; Jaishankar; Jayachitra; Thengai Srinivasan
- Cinematography: S. Maruti Rao
- Edited by: Panjabi; Narasimhan
- Music by: V. Kumar
- Production company: Ajantha Enterprises
- Release date: 13 November 1974
- Running time: 146 minutes
- Country: India
- Language: Tamil

Kaliyuga Kannan (transl. Kannan, from the Age of Vice) is a 1974 Indian Tamil-language devotional comedy drama film directed by Krishnan–Panju. It is based on the play Sri Krishna Vijayam written by Vaali. The film stars Sowcar Janaki, Jaishankar, Jayachitra and Thengai Srinivasan. It was released on 13 November 1974 and emerged a commercial success. The film was later remade in Telugu as Devude Digivaste (1975), in Kannada as Devara Duddu (1976), and in Hindi as Yehi Hai Zindagi (1977).

== Plot ==
While Sambu Iyer's wife is a devotee of Krishna, Sambu Iyer questions God's partiality and judgement. He happens to spend the money his wife had kept aside for God as an offering on a competition which he wins and uses to become rich. When God himself appears and asks for that money, he keeps putting off the return of the money taking credit for his success while blaming the lord for his failures. In the end, he concedes and acknowledges that God is fair, money is the root of all evil and reconciles with God at the time of his death.

== Cast ==
- Sowcar Janaki as Gayatri
- Jaishankar as Sambu's son
- Jayachitra as Radha
- V. K. Ramasamy as Radha's father
- Neelakantan as Krishnan
- Thengai Srinivasan as Sambu Iyer

== Production ==
Kaliyuga Kannan is the inaugural production of Ajantha Enterprises, and is an adaptation of Sri Krishna Vijayam, a play written by Vaali that featured Thengai Srinivasan as the protagonist. The play, which was written for actor V. Gopalakrishnan's Gopi Theatres, intended to convey the message that "money could not buy peace of mind". When adapting the play as a film, the makers wanted Sivaji Ganesan to star. But Ganesan suggested Srinivasan, after being impressed with his performance in the play. Vaali wrote the dialogue for the film adaptation, which was produced by N. Elango. Cinematography was handled by S. Maruti Rao. Besides directing, Panju co-edited the film (alongside Narasimhan) under the pseudonym "Panjabi". The final cut of the film measured 3,993 metres (13,100 ft).

== Soundtrack ==
The soundtrack was composed by V. Kumar, while the lyrics were written by Vaali. The playback singers were T. M. Soundararajan, S. P. Balasubrahmanyam, P. Susheela and Renuka. The songs featured were "Kannaiah", "Kadhal Ponnedu", "Jaichutte" and "Seven O'Clock".

== Release and reception ==
Kaliyuga Kannan was released on 13 November 1974. Kanthan of Kalki appreciated the film for Janaki's performance and Vaali's writing, calling it a good entertainer. The film emerged a commercial success.

== Legacy ==
Kaliyuga Kannan propelled Srinivasan to stardom. CV Aravind of The News Minute praised it for the "riveting script by Vaali". Playwright and comedian Crazy Mohan developed a desire to write a play with "God as the fulcrum" after watching the play Krishnaya Thubhyam Namaha, and Kaliyuga Kannan encouraged him to solidify his plans, resulting in the play Chocolate Krishna.
