= Rivaaj =

- Directed by: T. Prakash Rao
- Starring: Sanjeev Kumar; Farida Jalal; Mala Sinha
- Music by: Shankar Jaikishan
- Release date: 1972
- Country: India
- Language: Hindi

Rivaaj (The Custom) is a 1972 Hindi-language drama film directed by T. Prakash Rao, and produced by K. C. Bokadia. The film stars Sanjeev Kumar, Farida Jalal and Mala Sinha.

== Synopsis ==
The movie Rivaaj, meaning custom, starts with the melodious resounding of the voice of a young widow Lakshmi singing in the precincts of the famous temple, Jagdish Temple, Udaipur, praises of love for God Shri Krishna of Meera. She stays in the temple with her father, temple priest. In the temple itself she meets Shekhar, where both fall in love and want to get married, when opposition comes from Shekhar's mother, who is against child widow's re-marriage. She gets her son married to a woman of her choice. Lakshmi starts leading the life of a widow. Shekhar's is blessed with a daughter Rajji and starts leading a contented married life, when destiny jolts him with loss of his job and death of his wife with cancer. Rajji happens to witness him lighting the pyre of her mother by Hindu custom, is unable to understand, and suffers a psychological shock thinking that her father had burnt her mother alive and would burn her too! She starts hating him and is scared of him, which further deepens the pain and loss of Shekhar.

Here respite comes for Rajji when her grandmother tells her that her mother will come back in the form of a plant or take up another woman's form and return to her beloved daughter from God. Rajji goes to the cremation grounds again and sees a plant where her mother had been cremated. She starts talking to it as if it was her mother. Lakshmi who had come to the river near by, chances to hear Rajji talking to the plant and filled with emotion starts talking back from the back of a small temple of God Hanuman, pretending to be her mother. Rajji is overjoyed and the ritual is repeated everyday with Lakshmi being unaware as to whose daughter Rajji is.

Meanwhile Shekhar saves the life of the wheel chair ridden sister and heiress who appoints him as her estate manager, much to the chagrin of her brother. He is involved in saving her assets from her rogue brother many times which creates ill-will amongst them.

Shekhar is also told by his mother that Rajji meets some woman pretending to be her dead mother and Shekhar discovers that she is no other than Lakshmi who loves his daughter as her own now. Again Lakshmi is derided by Shekhar's mother as well as her own father Pujari ji for dreaming of having a family.

Shatrughan Sinha kidnaps Rajji and there ensues a bloody struggle which however nasty, brings back and unites Rajji, Lakshmi and Shekhar, bringing them back to the precincts of the holy Jagdish Ji Temple, the bells resounding the power and glory of God.

== Cast ==
- Sanjeev Kumar as Shekhar
- Mala Sinha as Lakshmi
- Pandari Bai as Shekhar's Mother
- Shatrughan Sinha
- Farida Jalal
- Sulochana Latkar

== Soundtrack ==
#	Title	Singer(s)
1	"Tujh Jaisi Ladli Lakhon Mein Ek"	Kishore Kumar
2	"Jala Do Duniya"	Mohammed Rafi, Manna Dey
3	"Lage Koi Lottery Koi Jackpot"	Mohammed Rafi
4	"Phoolon Sa Mahka Hua"	Suman Kalyanpur
5	"Phoolon Sa Mahka Hua"	Sharda
6	"Pyara Pyara Sabse Nyara"	Suman Kalyanpur
7	"Tujh Jaisi Ladli Lakhon Mein Ek (II)"	Lata Mangeshkar
8	"Tujhmen Hoon Main Mujhmen Hai Tu"	Mohammed Rafi, Asha Bhosle
