= Alibaba Aur 40 Chor (1966 film) =

1966 Hindi adventure fantasy film

- Directed by: Homi Wadia
- Screenplay by: Tabish Sultanpuri
- Produced by: Homi Wadia
- Starring: Sanjeev Kumar; L. Vijaylakshmi; Kamal Mehra; B.M. Vyas; S.N. Tripathi; Veena; Tabassum; Indira; David
- Music by: Usha Khanna
- Release date: 1966
- Country: India
- Language: Hindi

Alibaba Aur 40 Chor (Alibaba And 40 Thieves) is 1966 Hindi adventure fantasy film produced and directed by Homi Wadia and starring Sanjeev Kumar in the lead role. The film is based on Ali Baba's story from One Thousand and One Nights.

== Plot ==
Ali Baba finds a cave of treasures belonging to a gang of bandits. When the bandits realize there have been intruders, they seek revenge. Ali Baba must try to outwit who are trying leader of the 40 thieves who are trying to find and kill him.

== Cast ==
- Sanjeev Kumar as Ali Baba
- L. Vijayalaxmi as Princess Marjina
- David as Baba Mustafa
- Indira as Mir Qasim's wife, Ali Baba's sister-in-law
- Tabassum as Gulbadan
- Kamal Mehra as Aflatoon
- S. N. Tripathi as Mir Qasim
- B. M. Vyas as Daku Sardar
- Amarnath
- Veena as Razia, Ali Baba's elder sister
- Bhagawan Sinha
- Raj Rani
- Ramlal
- Yunus Parvez
- Prince Arjun
- Madhumati as Dancer
- Laxmi Chhaya as Qawaali Dancer
- Aruna
- Sukale
- Bismilla
- Mithoo Miya
- Samson
- Korega
- Yadav
- Tun Tun

== Soundtrack ==
Usha Khanna composed the film's music while lyricists Asad Bhopali, Prem Dhawan and Javed Anwar penned the songs.

All music is composed by Usha Khanna.

No.	Title	Singer(s)	Length
1.	"Aaja Bahon Men Dil Ki Rahon Men"	Suman Kalyanpur, Mukesh	5:36
2.	"Alibaba Alibaba"	Asha Bhosle	3:24
3.	"Dekhiye Zara Pyar Se"	Lata Mangeshkar	3:34
4.	"Jab Aap Salamat Hain"	Asha Bhosle, Usha Mangeshkar	6:18
5.	"Main maasoom, dil maasom Kya Ho Jaye kya maaloom"	Asha Bhosle	3:23
6.	"Saadgi Men Shokhi"	Krishna Kalle	3:22
7.	"Banaye Ja Bigade Ja"	Mohammed Rafi	4:58
