= Devata (1978 film) =

- Poster
- Directed by: S. Ramanathan
- Screenplay by: Gulzar
- Story by: Vietnam Veedu Sundaram
- Based on: Gnana Oli (Tamil)
- Produced by: N.N. Sippy
- Starring: Sanjeev Kumar; Shabana Azmi; Rakesh Roshan; Danny Denzongpa
- Cinematography: Nando Bhattacharya
- Edited by: Waman Bhonsle; Guru Dutt Shirali
- Music by: R. D. Burman
- Distributed by: Prithiva Pictures
- Release date: 1978
- Country: India
- Language: Hindi

Devata is a 1978 Indian Hindi-language film, directed by S. Ramanathan. The film stars Sanjeev Kumar, Shabana Azmi and Danny Denzongpa in lead roles. It is remake of Tamil film Gnana Oli.

== Synopsis ==
Tony, a village orphan marries his sweetheart, but loses her in childbirth. He showers all his love and devotion on his daughter Mary.

In her college days Mary falls in love with Shekhar, a playboy. When Shekhar refuses to marry her, Tony goes to meet him but finds him dead. Tony is arrested, charged with murder and sentenced for life but flees from custody.

Years later, when Tony returns as Tarun Kumar Gupta, Mary is delighted. Unfortunately, he must decide whether to run away again or face arrest and imprisonment.

== Cast ==
- Sanjeev Kumar as Tony / Tarun Kumar Gupta
- Shabana Azmi as Lily/Mary (Dual Role)
- Rakesh Roshan as George D'Costa
- Danny Denzongpa as Inspector Lawrence D'Costa
- Sarika as Lily (Mary's Daughter)
- Benjamin Gilani as Shekhar
- Shreeram Lagoo as Father Fernandes
- Asit Sen as Dr. Shambhunath
- Shubha Khote as Mrs. Shambhunath
- Dhumal as Lily's Father
- Keshto Mukherjee as Melaram

== Soundtrack ==
The music of the film is composed by R. D. Burman with lyrics by Gulzar.

| Song | Singer |
|---|---|
| Chand Churake Laya Hoon, Chal Baithe Church Ke Peechhe | Kishore Kumar, Lata Mangeshkar |
| Gulmohar Gar Tumhara Naam Hota | Kishore Kumar, Lata Mangeshkar |
| Main To Kare Badarwa Se Haari | Lata Mangeshkar |
| Jab Ek Qaza Se Guzro | Mohammed Rafi |

== Accolades ==
26th Filmfare Awards:

Won

- Best Sound Design – Ranjit Biswas

Nominated

- Best Actor – Sanjeev Kumar
- Best Supporting Actor – Danny Denzongpa
