= Charitraheen =

- Poster
- Directed by: Shakti Samanta
- Written by: Vrajendra Gaur
- Produced by: Debesh Ghosh
- Starring: Sanjeev Kumar; Sharmila Tagore; Yogeeta Bali; Asrani; Madan Puri
- Music by: Rahul Dev Burman
- Release date: 1974
- Running time: 148 minutes
- Country: India
- Language: Hindi

Charitraheen (lit. 'Characterless') is a 1974 Bollywood drama film directed by Shakti Samanta. The film stars Sanjeev Kumar and Sharmila Tagore. The film was on the program of the cinema S. Gabriel in Lourenço Marques, Mozambique in May 1975. It is a remake of Bengali movie Kalankito Nayak (1970) starring Uttam Kumar, Sabitri Chatterjee and Aparna Sen.

== Plot ==
The film begins in a courtroom, where a lawyer labels a person as characterless, promiscuous and asks if he knows anyone by the name of Rosy. He replies in the affirmative and a flashback starts shortly afterwards.

On a trip to a mountainous area, Indrajeet Mukherjee (Inder) suddenly encounters heavy rainfall and takes shelter in the house of an old gentleman nearby, where he meets a girl named Rama. As days pass, the bond between Rama and Inder grow stronger and it ultimately transforms into love. However, Rama's stepmother is eager to marry her off to a widowed person who has two kids. Rama immediately telephones Inder and tells Inder to meet him. But Inder is unable to meet Rama, as he receives a telegram from Calcutta informing him that his father was seriously ill. As a result, he is forced to leave but leaves a note for Rama. But his address in the letter gets washed away by rainwater.

In Calcutta, Inder's father's death leaves him severely devastated. He could manage 15,000 rupees by selling his shop but he needed additional 10,000 rupees for starting the business. He then goes to a local money lender, who agrees to pay the money. On his way to home, Inder gets tricked by a fraud named Ajit, who forcibly takes him to a red light area and takes away his money by deceit. Inder then collects Ajit's address and goes there to recover his lost money. There he meets Rama again, who reveals her to be Ajit's wife. She fled with Ajit because she fell into a dilemma about Whether to marry a widower with two children. She informs Inder that Ajit is a promiscuous man who probably has spent Inder's money behind alcohol and gambling. Suddenly Ajit arrives and starts beating Rama. Then at Rama's behest, Inder leaves Rama's house.

One day, when Inder was passing by Rama's home, Rama throws a piece of paper at Inder, where she requested Inder to come to her house. In the evening, Ajit tortures Rama after failing to find her jewelleries which he aims to spend behind his promiscuous activities. Rama begs Ajit to stop torturing her, as she is bearing their children. Ajit then becomes furious and accuses Rama of adultery. At the time, Inder arrives. Seeing him, Inder goes outside to call his hoodlum friends. Rama quickly brings her hidden jewelleries to Inder and requests him to use it. Then she flees from the house. Inder runs behind her and sees that Rama is attempting suicide. He rescues Rama and takes them to his house. But his mother shows unhappiness at Rama's arrival. In the morning, Inder is shocked to learn that his mother has sent Rama on a train to Banaras. He goes to Ajit's apartment to return the jewelleries, but then learns that Ajit was apprehended by the police.

Then he uses Rama's jewelleries to build his factory and quickly becomes a wealthy, thriving businessman. He then marries Kamala, the sister of Avinash, an acquaintance of her mother. On the day he decides to buy a house worth Rs.3 lakh, his mother passes her last breath. Inder then moves to the house with his wife and his younger brother Debojeet Mukherjee (Debu). Shortly afterwards, he marries Debu off.

The peace in their family is interrupted by Avinash's trickeries. Avinash siphons money from both Kamala and Inder. Inder then gives him the duty of managing daily activities of the office. The cunning Avinash successfully requests Inder to not include his name in the salary register, effectively ensuring that no written proof of his work in the company exists.

For the purpose of a contract Inder has to leave for Delhi. He gives a cheque worth Rs.1 lakh and two blank cheques to Avinash, so that he can pay off the worker's salaries and other due payments.

In Delhi, Inder learns that he has to convince a guy named Khosla to get his desired contract. He meets Khosla at a party and disappointed to see his lustful character. He again meets Rama and is shocked to see her promiscuous behavior. Rama then takes Inder to her apartment. She informs that she has now adopted the name "Rosy".

Rama tells Inder that on the train to Banaras, she felt asleep. Suddenly the ticket checker awake her up and asked to see the ticket. The ticket checker then informed her that they had left Banaras long ago and now they are in Kashi. He then asked for fine but Rama had no money. A lewd man then paid for the money of the ticket and took Rama to his home. At night, he tried to rape her but Rama manages to lock him in the room and flees away. But nowhere she was treated with dignity. She was viewed merely as a bodily object. She later fell unconscious and gave birth to a daughter. In order to feed her daughter, Rama became a prostitute.

Inder is sad to learn Rama's fate. Then Rama asks him the purpose of coming to Delhi. Rama then seduces Khosla and secures the contract for Inder. Then she asks Inder to accompany her to Shimla. In the hotel, they are spotted together by Kamala's uncle Ashok. Ashok suspects an affair and writes a letter to Avinash. In Shimla, Rama introduces her daughter Minu and tells that she has used Inder's name as her father's name, in order to save her daughter from Ajit's clutches.

Taking opportunity of Inder's absence, Avinash steals all the money from the company's account. Moreover, he sows misunderstanding between Inder and his family members using Ashok's letter. In Delhi, Inder receives a telegram which informs him that workers have been protesting after not getting their wages. Shocked, Inder returns to Calcutta and understands that Ajit has stolen all the money. He summons Ajit to his office. Ajit then denies every accusation and tells that legal actions can not be taken against him as there is no written proof of his work in the company.

A devastated Inder faces ill treatment at home. Depressed, he gradually succumbs to alcoholism. Rama then spots Ajit at a drinking club. Ajit tells her everything. Rama then decides to help him. She sends a telegram telling that everything is arranged. The telegram gets read by Debu and his wife and they become suspicious. Then they seek Avinash's help. Avinash tells them that the arrangements actually mean wedding arrangements. Kamala becomes astonished and decides to check the reality for herself. She, Avinash and Debu go to Delhi. They see Rama (Rosy), Inder and Minu together. Then they see Rama and Inder go to the state bank and withdraw money. Although Rama withdrew the money to help Inder, Avinash tricks Kamala and Debu into perceiving that Inder is depositing his business money into Rama's personal bank account. Outraged, everyone except Inder's old servant leave the house.

Inder goes to Avinash's home to find out the whereabouts of Kamala, but Avinash tells him that Kamala has killed herself.

Next day, Inder gets a summon from the court after Debu files a case alleging that Inder had confiscated his share in their father's property. Everyone in the court testifies against Inder. Even Kamala is found to be alive, who spread the false rumors of her death so that Inder can live peacefully with Rosy.

Rama a.k.a. Rosy learns everything from the newspaper and goes to the court and tells everything from the beginning. Then the truths come out and all the misunderstanding is cleared. Kamala suddenly feels unconscious in the court and Inder rushes to her. Rosy silently departs the court building.

The next day, Kamala expresses her desire to meet Rama. Inder telephones Rama and informs her of Kamala's desire. Rama initially agrees but then decides to leave for good and give away her daughter to Inder and Kamala. Inder and Kamala arrive at Rama's hotel but are unable to find Rama. Suddenly Inder discovers a handwritten note by Rama, informing him of her permanent departure and requesting him to take care of Minu. Both Inder and Kamala then feel grieved.

== Cast ==
- Sanjeev Kumar as Inder / Indrajeet Mukherjee
- Sharmila Tagore as Rama / Rosy
- Yogeeta Bali as Kamala Mukherjee
- G. Asrani as Debo / Devjeet Mukherjee
- Satya Banerjee as Rama's father
- Dina Pathak as Inder's mother
- Asit Sen as Mahavir kaka
- Raza Murad as Inder's lawyer
- Utpal Dutt as Avinash's Lawyer(Cameo)
- Madan Puri as Avinash
- Chandrashekhar as Ashok babu
- Arpana Chaudhary as Jamnabai Dancer
- Manmohan as Ajit Kumar Verma
- Jankidas as Sethji at Ramdas Kishandas & Co
- Murad as Judge
- Nandita Thakur as Kavita Mukherjee
- Leena D'Souza as Lead Dancer in song Teri meri yaari...
- Sujit Kumar as Mr.Khosla
- Anita Guha as Rama's mother
- Tyrone Aviet as a Dancer
- Sopariwala as Mr.Mehra
- Amol Sen as gatekeeper
- Baby Sabiha as Meenu
- Tarun Kumar Chatterjee as man drinking at bar
- Kanu Roy as Bade babu

== Soundtrack ==
Lyrics by Anand Bakshi.

#	Title	Singer(s)
1	"Dil Se Dil Milne Ka"	Kishore Kumar, Lata Mangeshkar
2	"Chhota Sa Apna Ghar"	Lata Mangeshkar
3	"Daga Beiman Dai Gaya"	Asha Bhosle
4	"Teri Meri Yaari Badi Purani"	Asha Bhosle
5	"Title Music (Charitraheen)"	

== Trivia ==
When Sanjeev Kumar goes to Delhi after receiving telegram from Rosy, his family follows him. However, the scene is actually shot in Mumbai, as one can see the Worli branch of State Bank of India when he walks out with Sharmila Tagore.
