= Sanjeev Kumar =

Indian film actor (1938–1985)

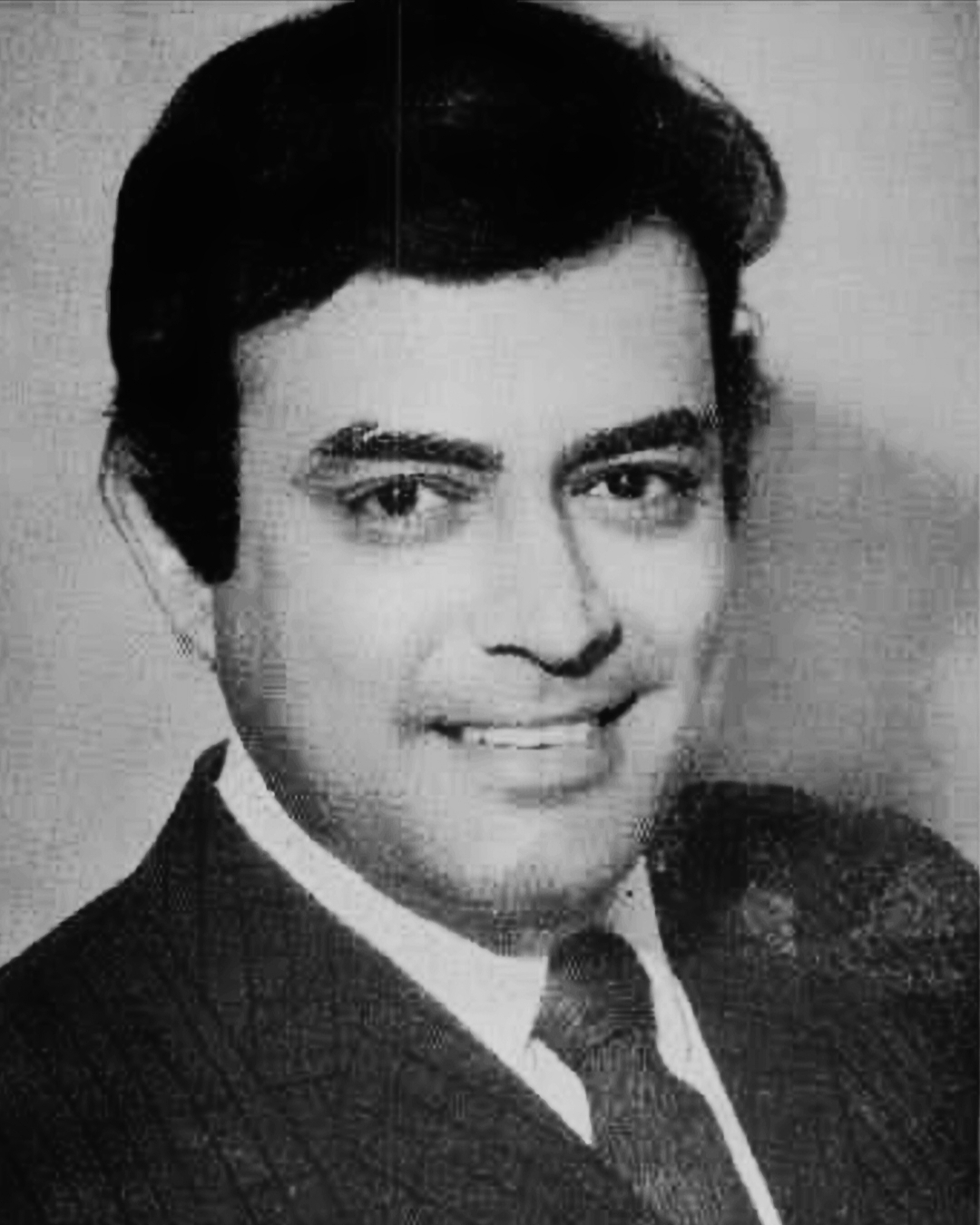
- Sanjeev Kumar, c. 1973
- Born: Harihar Jethalal Jariwala; 9 July 1938; Surat, Bombay Presidency, British India (present day Surat, Gujarat, India)
- Died: 6 November 1985 (aged 47); Bombay, Maharashtra, India
- Other name: Haribhai
- Occupation: Actor
- Years active: 1960–1985
- Works: Full list

Sanjeev Kumar (born Harihar Jethalal Jariwala; 9 July 1938 – 6 November 1985) was an Indian actor who worked in Hindi and Gujarati cinema. Regarded as one of the greatest and finest actors in the history of Indian cinema, Kumar was known for his acting versatility. He acted in a wide variety of genres ranging from romantic drama to thriller. He was voted seventh among the "Greatest Actors of Indian cinema of All Time" in a poll conducted by Rediff.com. His double role in Angoor was listed among the "25 Iconic Performances of Indian cinema" by Forbes India on the occasion of celebrating 100 years of Indian Cinema.

He won several major awards, including two National Film Awards for Best Actor in Dastak (1970) and Koshish (1972). Some of his acclaimed performances include Sholay (1975), Arjun Pandit (1976) and Trishul (1978), Khilona (1970), Naya Din Nai Raat (1974), Yehi Hai Zindagi (1977), Devata (1978) and Ram Tere Kitne Naam (1985). His performances in comedy genre films, such as Manchali (1973), Pati Patni Aur Woh (1978), Biwi-O-Biwi (1981) Angoor (1982) and Hero (1983) were also well received.

== Early life and background ==
Sanjeev Kumar was born as Harihar Jethalal Jariwala (also referred to as Haribhai) on 9 July 1938 in Surat into a Gujarati Khatri family, who dealt in zari (brocade). He came to Bombay when he was very young. His father, Jethalal, died from a massive heart attack, when Kumar was only eleven years old. A stint in a film school led him to Bollywood, where he eventually became an accomplished actor. He is widely acclaimed by the critics and general public alike to be one of the all-time greatest actors of Indian cinema.

Kumar had two younger brothers and one sister. He spoke Gujarati, Hindi and English fluently.

== Career ==
Kumar started his acting career as a stage actor, starting with IPTA in Bombay and later joining the Indian National Theatre. Even as a stage actor, he had a penchant for playing older roles; at age 22, he played an old man in an adaptation of Arthur Miller's All My Sons. In the following year, in the play Damru directed by A.K. Hangal, he again played the role of a 60-year-old with six children.

He made his film debut with a small role in Hum Hindustani in 1960. His first film as a protagonist was in Nishan (1965). In 1968, he acted alongside Dilip Kumar in Sunghursh. He also starred opposite Shammi Kapoor and Sadhana in the hit film Sachaai (1969).

He starred in the 1966 Gujarati film Kalapi, which was based on the poet Kalapi's life, with him playing the title role, Padmarani playing the role of his wife, Rama and Aruna Irani as the love interest. The film was directed by Manhar Raskapur. Later Aruna Irani worked with him in another Gujarati film, Mare Javun Pele Par (1968).

In 1970, the movie Khilona, which was the remake of Gujarati film Mare Javun Pele Paar (1968), brought Kumar national recognition. In 1972, he played in an Indo-Iranian film, Subah-O-Shaam. This was when the director Gulzar first spotted him. Later he cast Kumar in the roles of older men in 4 films Parichay (1972), Koshish (1973), Aandhi (1975) and Mausam (1975). Gulzar cast Kumar in the roles of younger men in the films Angoor (1981) and Namkeen (1982). He won the BFJA Awards for Best Actor (Hindi) for his portrayal of a deaf and mute person in Koshish opposite Jaya Bhaduri. He reached to his success when he starred in the box office hits Seeta Aur Geeta (1972), Manchali (1973) and Aap Ki Kasam (1974). In 1973, he made a guest appearance during a song in a Tamil movie, Bharatha Vilas (1973). He performed in nine movies directed by Gulzar. Hrishikesh Mukherjee directed him in Arjun Pandit, for which he won the Filmfare Best Actor Award.

He did three films opposite famous Tamil actress L. Vijayalakshmi, including Husn Aur Ishq and Badal which became hits. Their first film was Alibaba Aur 40 Chor which was unsuccessful. His Raja Aur Runk, released in 1968, was a great success. He did Kangan, Rivaaj, Zindagi, Be-Reham, Archana and Do Ladkiyan opposite Mala Sinha. He did Priya, Anubhav, Gustaaki Maaf, Bachpan and Khud-Daar with Tanuja. He was paired with Raakhee in Angaare, Paras, Trishna, Shriman Shrimati and Hamare Tumhare. His hits with Leena Chandavarkar included Apne Rang Hazar, Manchali and Anhonee. He was paired regularly with Sulakshana Pandit in films such as Uljhan and Waqt Ki Deewar and with Moushumi Chatterjee in Itni Si Baat and Daasi.

The producers and directors of the South wanted to remake their Tamil and Telugu films in Hindi with either Kumar or Rajesh Khanna in lead. It was these Hindi film remakes which elevated the success in his career. Khilona and its Tamil version Engirundho Vandhaal were made simultaneously. Navarathri was remade as Naya Din Nai Raat. Kumar reprised the role played by Thengai Srinivasan in Yehi Hai Zindagi which was a remake of Kaliyuga Kannan. He starred as the lead Shaandaar (1974) which was a remake of Kasturi Nivasa with Kannada actor Dr. Rajkumar in the lead. Kumar enacted the role played by AVM Rajan in Anadhai Aanandhan, in its Hindi version Chanda Aur Bijli. Gnana Oli was remade as Devata in 1978 with Kumar reprising the role originally played by Sivaji Ganesan. He also acted in Swarag Narak (1978) the remake of Swargam Narakam. He played the role which N.T. Rama Rao did originally in Devina Chesina Manushulu, in its Hindi version Takkar in 1980. Tayaramma Bangarayya was remade as Shriman Shrimati in 1982, Raman Ethanai Ramanadi was remade as Raam Kitne Tere Naam in 1985. Kumar reprised the role played by R.Muthuraman in Alukuoru Aasai in its Hindi remake Itni Si Baat in 1981. Sivaji Ganesan gave Kumar a role in his own home production Gauri (1968), which was a remake of Shanti (1965). The role played by S.S. Rajendran in Shanti was re-enacted by Kumar in Gauri.

Northern Indian producers and directors cast Kumar primarily in supporting roles in films like Khud-Daar, Sawaal, Zabardast, Hero, and Silsila. Sanjeev Kumar's excellent comic timing entertained audiences in films such as Seeta Aur Geeta, Biwi O Biwi (1981), Pati, Patni Aur Woh, Angoor (1982) and Hero (1983).

His performances in films such as Charitraheen, Grihapravesh, Chehre Pe Chehra, Suraag, Sawaal and Yaadgaar were appreciated by critics. Kumar always demonstrated a willingness to take on unconventional roles that challenged him as an actor. His role as Mirza Sajjad Ali, a chess-obsessed Lucknowi (citizen of Lucknow), in Satyajit Ray's classic Shatranj Ke Khilari (1977) exemplified that aspect. His best-remembered roles were in the blockbuster films Sholay (1975) and Trishul (1978). His portrayal of the character Thakur, from Sholay was regarded as one of his stellar performances. In Naya Din Nayi Raat (1974), Kumar reprised nine-roles. This film enhanced his status and reputation as a serious actor in Bollywood. He stood his ground against leading superstars such as Rajesh Khanna in Aap Ki Kasam; Amitabh Bachchan and Shashi Kapoor in the Yash Chopra multi-star cast film Trishul (1978) and Dilip Kumar in Sangharsh and Vidhaata (1982).

He did many regional films in different languages including Marathi, Punjabi, Tamil, Telugu, Sindhi and his mother land Gujarati. In 1980, he starred in the Punjabi movie Fauji Chacha. He also made guest appearances in two Tamil films, Bharata Vilas and Uyarndhavargal (a remake of Koshish).

== Personal life ==
Kumar remained single all his life. He had proposed to Hema Malini in 1973 and they remained in touch thereafter. Sulakshana Pandit later recounted having been in love with him and having proposed marriage to him which he politely declined. It is speculated as a result of this rejection, Pandit chose to remain unmarried.

== Health problems and death ==
After his first heart attack, he underwent a bypass surgery in the U.S. However, on 6 November 1985, at the age of 47, he suffered a massive heart attack, which resulted in his death. His younger brother Nikul died before him, while his other brother Kishore died six months later.

More than ten of Kumar's films were released after his death with the last one, Professor Ki Padosan, released in December 1993. At the time of his death, only 75% of the film was complete and it was eventually decided to alter the storyline in the second half to explain the absence of Kumar's character.

== Artistry and legacy ==
Kumar is regarded as one the greatest actors in Indian cinema. He was known for his diverse roles, charm, elegance and ability to bring authenticity and depth to a wide range. He did not mind playing roles that were non-glamorous, such as characters well beyond his age. In 2022, Kumar was placed in Outlook India's "75 Best Bollywood Actors" list.

"Normally great acting performances are associated with tragedy, or the character exhibiting a panoply of emotions. It is not often that a comic role gets this status. The one exception is Sanjeev Kumar’s double role in Angoor (based on Shakespeare’s The Comedy of Errors) where he makes you joyful with effortless acting and amazing comic timing."

— Forbes India on Kumar's performance in Angoor (1982)

Dinesh Raheja of Rediff.com noted, "Sanjeev Kumar thrived in spite of defying many of Bollywood's norms for heroes. He defied the industry's unwritten-rules not out of necessity, but by choice. This actor did not have to sequin himself in designer duds to endear himself to the audience. He did so with his virtuoso performances." Devesh Sharma of Filmfare said, "Whether he made you cry in Koshish, or laugh in Angoor, put you on the edge in Sholay or shocked you in Khilona, he could do it with ease. When a director hired Sanjeev Kumar, he hired the luxury of going to sleep. The actor would arrive at the fag end of the shift and wind up before the rest of them. Such was his easy talent. Sanjeev Kumar was a real actor." In 2010, Filmfare included Kumar's performances in Mausam, Aandhi, Angoor and Sholay in its list of Bollywood's "80 Iconic Performances".

Jyothi Jha of The Indian Express wrote, "There is a popular saying: 'A flame that burns twice as bright, lasts half as long!' Sanjeev Kumar is the best way to define the life of the star". Deccan Herald stated, "An artiste par excellence, Kumar enjoyed a strong fan following due to his impressive screen presence, impeccable dialogue delivery and intelligent selection of roles. 'Hari Bhai' often played aged characters, proving that he was not afraid to experiment with his reel image."

== Awards ==
=== Film awards ===
Year	Category	Nominated work	Result
National Film Awards
1971	Best Actor	Dastak	Won
1973	Best Actor	Koshish	Won
Filmfare Awards
1969	Best Supporting Actor	Shikar	Won
1971	Best Actor	Khilona	Nominated
1974	Best Actor	Koshish	Nominated
1976	Best Actor	Sholay	Nominated
1976	Best Actor	Aandhi	Won
1977	Best Actor	Mausam	Nominated
1977	Best Actor	Arjun Pandit	Won
1978	Best Actor	Yehi Hai Zindagi	Nominated
1978	Best Actor	Zindagi	Nominated
1979	Best Actor	Devata	Nominated
1979	Best Actor	Pati Patni Aur Woh	Nominated
1979	Best Supporting Actor	Trishul	Nominated
1983	Best Supporting Actor	Vidhaata	Nominated
1983	Best Actor	Angoor	Nominated
Bengal Film Journalists' Association Awards
1974	Best Actor (Hindi)	Koshish	Won

=== Other awards ===
- 1969 – Naval Stars Awards, Shanoo Varun Trophy by S.M. Nanda
- 1971 – Surat Jilla Leuva Patidar Gnyati.
- 1975 – Cinegoers Council (Delhi) Film Awards
- 1976 – Lion Club of North Calcutta Actor of the year for Mausam
- 1984 – Maratha Seva Sangh Dist Khed
- Best Actor (Stage) for the Gujarati play Koi no Ladakh Vayo
- Kalashri Art & Network "Lifetime Achievement Millennium 2000 Award" at Surat
- 18th National Award "Bharat Puraskar" by Information & Broadcast State Minister Mrs Nandini Satapthi at Shanmukhanand Hall (Mumbai)
- Army Officers Voice Association Trophy
- Andhra Pradesh Film Journalist Award
- Chitralok Cine Serjak Award (Ahmedabad)

== Government recognition ==
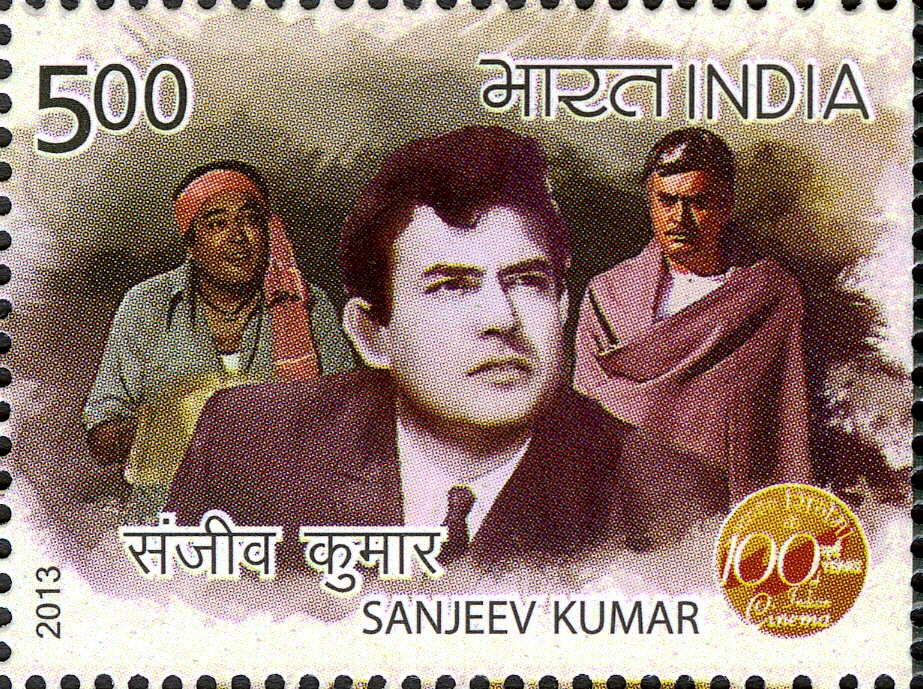
Kumar on a 2013 stamp of India.

A road has been named after him in Surat, Gujarat as Sanjeev Kumar Marg, which was inaugurated by veteran actor Sunil Dutt.

A school has been named after him in his home town Surat, Gujarat, and was inaugurated by the then Mayor Kadir K. Pirzada. A postage stamp was released by India Post to honour him on 3 May 2013.

An auditorium, named Sanjeev Kumar Auditorium built by the Surat Municipal Corporation at the cost of 108cr, was opened in his home town. It was inaugurated on 14 February 2014 by the then Chief Minister of Gujarat Narendra Modi.

== Philanthropy ==
The Sanjeev Kumar Foundation is a national level development organisation (NGO) directly benefiting children and their families every year, mainly focusing on education, healthcare, environment, culture and nutrition. From 2015 onwards the foundation has also been the sponsor of the annual Sanjeev Kumar Drama Competition held by the Surat Municipal Corporation. The awards and cash prizes are given in memory of Sanjeev Kumar to the best actor, actress, director and backstage technician every year.
