= Ram Tere Kitne Nam =

- Poster
- Directed by: P. Madhavan
- Written by: Jainendra Jain (dialogues)
- Screenplay by: M. Balamurugan
- Story by: M. Balamurugan
- Produced by: Harish Shah
- Starring: Sanjeev Kumar; Rekha
- Cinematography: Munir Khan
- Edited by: Bimal Roy
- Music by: R. D. Burman
- Production company: Vision Universal
- Distributed by: Vision Universal
- Release date: 15 February 1985
- Country: India
- Language: Hindi

Ram Tere Kitne Nam (transl. Ram, how many names do you have? Hindi pronunciation: [raːm teːreː kɪtneː naːm]) is a 1985 Indian Hindi-language film, directed by P. Madhavan and produced by Harish Shah. The film stars Sanjeev Kumar and Rekha. It is a remake of the director's own Tamil film Raman Ethanai Ramanadi.

== Plot ==
Ram, funnily called, "Peturam", is an overweight and sensitive young man, who is head over heels in love with beautiful Radha, the only sister of Thakur Tej Singh and would like to marry her. When he proposes to marry her, Tej makes fun of him, asks him to gather together at least 10 lakh rupees before he can even be considered as a prospective groom. Crestfallen, Ram re-locates to Bombay, where he starts to work driving a taxi, and buying lottery tickets, all quite in vain, as he finds himself quite far away from his target of 10 lakh rupees. Then one day he meets with a Bollywood Film Director, who decides to give him a chance in movies. The movie turns out to be a success, making Ram, who is now known as Ram Kumar, a millionaire overnight. Pleased with his success and ensuring that he has more than enough to satisfy Tej Singh, Ram triumphantly returns to his home-town in his chauffeur-driven Mercedes Benz, only to find out that Radha has already been married to a man Aloknath Gupta and is soon to bear his child. Watch how a devastated Ram Kumar attempts to put the remainder of his life together, in a career that he never wanted in the first place.

== Cast ==
- Sanjeev Kumar as Ram "Peturam" / Ram Kumar
- Rekha as Radha Singh
- Prem Chopra as Thakur Tej Singh
- Shammi Kapoor as Film Director
- Vinod Mehra as Aloknath Gupta
- Sachin as Gopi / Chandan
- Lalita Pawar as Ram's Grandmother
- Jagdish Raj as Jailor
- Chandrashekhar as Judge
- Sudhir as Diwan Lalchand
- Yunus Parvez as Chaudhary Harbhajan Singh
- Pinchoo Kapoor as Ram Kumar's Lawyer

== Soundtrack ==
The music was composed by R. D. Burman.

Song	Singer
"O Meri Jaan" (Sad)	Kishore Kumar
"O Meri Jaan" (Happy)	Kishore Kumar
"Zooby Zooby Mehboobi"	Kishore Kumar
"Machal Machal Jata Hai"	Lata Mangeshkar
"Manzil Thi Kahin"	Lata Mangeshkar
"Insaniyat Hi Sabse Pehla"	Aarti Mukherjee
