= Shikar (1968 film) =

- Poster
- Directed by: Atma Ram
- Written by: Abrar Alvi; Dhruva Chatterjee
- Produced by: Atma Ram
- Starring: Dharmendra; Asha Parekh
- Cinematography: V. K. Murthy
- Edited by: Y. G. Chawhan
- Music by: Shankar-Jaikishan
- Release date: 6 September 1968
- Country: India
- Language: Hindi

Shikar (transl. Prey) is a 1968 Hindi thriller film produced and directed by Atma Ram. The film is a murder mystery. It stars Dharmendra, Asha Parekh, Sanjeev Kumar, Helen, Rehman, Johnny Walker, Bela Bose, Ramesh Deo in pivotal roles. The music of the film was composed by Shankar-Jaikishan and its songs were penned by Hasrat Jaipuri. Asha Bhosle won the Filmfare award for best Female Playback singer for the song "Parde Mein Rehne Do".

== Plot ==
Manager Ajay Singh finds out that a man by the name of Naresh is murdered and informs police inspector Rai, but all the evidence is tampered with at the crime scene and as a result the murderer becomes difficult to trace. From here on, Ajay's life takes a new turn in trying to find the culprit who has murdered Naresh. In the process he meets a young woman, Kiran, whom Ajay had seen at the murder spot with the murder weapon. She is the daughter of a respectable person. Next time he sees her at the stage dancing on ,'parde me rahne do parda na uthaao' and she has some crucial evidence that might lead Ajay to the culprit who has murdered alcoholic and womanizer Naresh.

== Cast ==
- Dharmendra as Ajay Singh
- Asha Parekh as Kiran Sharma
- Sanjeev Kumar as Inspector Rai
- Helen as Veera
- Rehman as Sharma
- Johnny Walker as Teju
- Bela Bose as Mahua
- Ramesh Deo as Naresh Mathur
- Manmohan as Robby
- Shyam Kumar as Mahua's Father

== Soundtrack ==
Music by Shankar-Jaikishan, lyrics by Hasrat Jaipuri.

| Song | Singer(s) |
|---|---|
| "Shikar Karne Ko Aaye..." | Mohammed Rafi |
| "Mere Sarkar, Meri Aahon Ka Asar Dekh Liya..." | Mahendra Kapoor, Krishna Kalle |
| "Jabse Lagi Tose Najariya, Nas Nas Mein Daude Hai..." | Lata Mangeshkar, Asha Bhosle |
| "Main Albeli Pyar Jatakar..." | Asha Bhosle |
| "Hay Mere Paas To Aa..." | Asha Bhosle |
| "Parde Mein Rahne Do..." | Asha Bhosle |

== Awards and nominations ==
- 1969 Filmfare Awards

- Best Supporting Actor - Won - Sanjeev Kumar
- Best Female Playback Singer - Won - Asha Bhosle singing "Parde Mein Rahne Do"
- Best Comedian - Won - Johnny Walker
- Best Sound Design - Won - P. Thakkersey
- Best Supporting Actress - Nominated - Helen
