= Biwi-O-Biwi =

- Poster
- Directed by: Rahul Rawail
- Written by: Prabhakar Tamhane (story)
- Screenplay by: Ravindra Peepat
- Produced by: Raj Kapoor
- Starring: Sanjeev Kumar; Randhir Kapoor; Poonam Dhillon; Yogeeta Bali
- Cinematography: Taru Dutt
- Edited by: Shankar Hurde
- Music by: R. D. Burman
- Production company: R. K. Films
- Release date: 29 May 1981
- Running time: 156 minutes
- Country: India
- Language: Hindi

Biwi-O-Biwi is a 1981 romantic-comedy Hindi movie produced by Raj Kapoor and directed by Rahul Rawail. It stars Sanjeev Kumar, Randhir Kapoor, Poonam Dhillon, and Yogeeta Bali. The film's music is by R. D. Burman.

== Cast ==
- Sanjeev Kumar as Colonel Mangal Singh / Shankar / Commander Chatur Singh (Double role)
- Randhir Kapoor as Chandramohan "Chandar"
- Poonam Dhillon as Asha Singh
- Yogeeta Bali as Reena
- Simi Garewal as Nisha
- Shashikala as Nirmala
- Deven Verma as Gafoor
- Prema Narayan as Rita
- Rajendra Nath as Veer Singh
- Hari Shivdasani as Colonel Hari Singh
- Dina Pathak as Mrs. Singh
- Sunder as Girdhari

== Music ==
=== Track listing ===
Vitthalbhai Patel has written the song "Waqt Se Pehle". The other songs were written by Nida Fazli.

Song	Singer
"Meri Bulbul, Yun Na Ho Gul, Is Kadar Mat Sata"	Kishore Kumar, Lata Mangeshkar
"Ek Nahin, Do Nahin, Sau Sau Baar Kahoon Main"	Lata Mangeshkar, Kishore Kumar
"Sadiyon Se Duniya Mein"	Kishore Kumar
"Gori Ho, Kaali Ho"	Kishore Kumar
"Waqt Se Pehle"	Kishore Kumar
"Socha Tha Kya"	Kishore Kumar
"Paise Ka Khel Nirala"	Mohammed Rafi, Asha Bhosle
