= Pati Patni Aur Woh (1978 film) =

1978 Indian film by B. R. Chopra

- Poster
- Directed by: B. R. Chopra
- Written by: Kamleshwar
- Produced by: B. R. Chopra
- Starring: Sanjeev Kumar; Vidya Sinha; Ranjeeta; Asrani
- Music by: Ravindra Jain
- Release date: 7 July 1978
- Running time: 141 minutes
- Country: India
- Language: Hindi

Pati Patni Aur Woh (transl. Husband, Wife and Her) is a 1978 Indian Hindi-language romantic comedy film produced and directed by B. R. Chopra. The film stars Sanjeev Kumar, Vidya Sinha, Ranjeeta Kaur, with cameos from Rishi Kapoor, Neetu Singh, Tina Munim and Parveen Babi.

The film was remade in 2019, with Kartik Aaryan, Bhumi Pednekar and Ananya Pandey in the lead roles.

== Plot ==
The film starts off indicating the parallels of the story with that of Adam and Eve. Here, Adam is Ranjeet, Eve is Sharda while the apple is Nirmala. Ranjeet is newly employed in a company, whose pay scales can be gauged from the fact that he goes to work on a bicycle. However, this bicycle itself brings him face-to-face with Sharda, when he bumps into her by accident. Sharda's bicycle gets badly damaged and Ranjeet drops her off. The same evening, Ranjeet goes to the wedding of his friend Harish whose bride happens to live in Sharda's colony. Sharda is also present at the ceremony. Sharda and Ranjeet's love blossoms from there and soon they get married.

In the course of a few years, Ranjeet is the sales manager of the company and father of a son. Sharda and Ranjeet are still living in marital bliss. That is, until Nirmala, Ranjeet's new secretary, shows up. Ranjeet is inexplicably attracted to Nirmala. She is an honest girl who is trying to make two ends meet. She is much more beautiful compared to Sharda. But most of all, she knows nothing about Ranjeet's true intentions and his married life. Ranjeet is initially upset with his thoughts about her, but finally gives in.

He carefully plans his further steps. He pretends to be the helpless grieving husband of a cancer stricken wife, who won't live much longer. Nirmala feels sorry for him, thus making it easier for him to get close to her. Nobody, not Sharda, not even his closest friend, suspects a thing. One day, Ranjeet bluffs to Sharda that he will be late coming home as he has a meeting. He takes Nirmala out to dinner. Next day, Sharda finds Nirmala's handkerchief, with lipstick marks on it, in Ranjeet's pocket.

She immediately confronts Ranjeet, who makes up a story about a co-worker whose handkerchief he may have accidentally taken. Sharda reluctantly believes him. Ranjeet decides to take his next steps more carefully. Sharda too starts thinking that her fears were unfounded. Ranjeet makes even more interesting back up plans: He prepares two books of poetry, professing his love. The poems are the same in both, only one book contains Nirmala's name, and the other contains Sharda's.

Ranjeet courts Nirmala without Sharda's knowledge. The turning point comes when Sharda sees him in a hotel with Nirmala. She later asks him about his meeting, about which the clueless Ranjeet lies. Sharda's fears are confirmed. She starts spying on him and Nirmala, taking incriminating pictures. After sufficient evidence is obtained, she secretly meets Nirmala, posing as a journalist. Nirmala, who hasn't seen Ranjeet's "ailing wife" yet, thinks Sharda intends to blackmail her. But Sharda reassures her that she won't.

Nirmala spills all the beans, upon which Sharda reveals her true identity. Meanwhile, Ranjeet gets another promotion and rushes home happily to tell his wife about it. Sharda catches him unawares and lets him know that he is busted. Ranjeet does not know what has hit him. He turns round, only to see Nirmala behind him. Sharda tells him that she is leaving him and the divorce papers will be soon sent to him. Sharda and Nirmala console each other. Ranjeet calls upon his friend and lies that Nirmala has said some malicious lies to Sharda about him.

Ranjeet's friend sides with him and lies about Nirmala's character. Sharda exposes Ranjeet in front of him as well, with help of the evidence she has collected. Sharda tells Ranjeet to choose either her or Nirmala. Ranjeet quietly gives Nirmala some money and lies to her, in a last-ditch attempt at damage control. But honest Nirmala returns the money to Sharda, making things even worse for Ranjeet. Sharda prepares to walk out on Ranjeet, while Nirmala resigns and leaves Ranjeet as well. Sharda comes to visit Ranjeet one last time, when their innocent son asks what is happening.

Sharda decides to give Ranjeet another chance, if only for their son and soon life comes back on track. But soon another secretary joins the office and Ranjeet tries to resort to his antics once more. Just by coincidence, Ranjeet's friend suddenly walks in and Ranjeet backs off, taking this as a warning.

== Cast ==
- Sanjeev Kumar as Ranjeet Chhadha
- Vidya Sinha as Sharda Chhadha
- Ranjeeta Kaur as Nirmala Deshpande
- Asrani as Abdul Karim Durrani
- Parveen Babi as Neeta (cameo)
- Nana Palsikar as Nanaji
- Om Shivpuri as Sharda's father
- Rishi Kapoor in a cameo in the song "Tere Naam Tere Naam")
- Neetu Singh in a cameo in the song "Tere Naam Tere Naam")
- Tina Munim

== Soundtrack ==
All lyrics are written by Anand Bakshi; all music is composed by Ravindra Jain.

Songs
No.	Title	Playback	Length
1.	"Na Aaj Tha Na Kal Tha"	Kishore Kumar
2.	"Ladki Cycle Wali"	Mahendra Kapoor, Asha Bhosle
3.	"Tere Naam Tere Naam"	Mahendra Kapoor
4.	"Thande Thande Paani Se Nahana"	Mahendra Kapoor, Asha Bhosle, Poornima

Ram Mohan designed the animated title sequence for the film, featuring the song "Na Aaj Tha Na Kal Tha".

== Awards and nominations ==
Year	Nominee / work	Award	Result
1979	Kamleshwar	Filmfare Award for Best Screenplay	Won
1979	Sanjeev Kumar	Filmfare Award for Best Actor	Nominated
1979	Ranjeeta Kaur	Filmfare Award for Best Supporting Actress	Nominated

== Remake ==
A remake of the film was released on 6 December 2019. It is produced by Bhushan Kumar, Juno Chopra and Abhay Chopra with Rajiv Jha. The film stars Kartik Aaryan, Bhumi Pednekar and Ananya Pandey and is directed by Mudassar Aziz.
