= Trishna (1978 film) =

- DVD cover
- Directed by: Anil Ganguly
- Written by: Sachin Bhowmick; M.G. Hashmat; Amarjeet
- Produced by: G. P. Sippy; Ramesh Sippy
- Starring: Shashi Kapoor; Sanjeev Kumar; Raakhee
- Cinematography: Dwarka Divecha
- Edited by: M. S. Shinde
- Music by: Kalyanji Anandji
- Distributed by: Sippy Films
- Release date: 1978
- Running time: 2 hours 7 min
- Country: India
- Language: Hindi

Trishna is a 1978 Indian Hindi film directed by Anil Ganguly. The film stars Shashi Kapoor, Sanjeev Kumar and Raakhee in lead roles. The film is loosely inspired by the 1977 Tamil film Thoondil Meen.

== Plot ==
Dr. Sunil Gupta (Sanjeev Kumar) lives a wealthy lifestyle with his wife, Aarti (Raakhee). After several years of marriage the couple still struggle to bring a child to the world. Aarti decides to take a break and visits their Khandala bungalow, which is near her sister Vidya's (Bindu) house, where she lives with her husband (Sujit Kumar) and their son Raju. Aarti's bungalow is being decorated by Vinod (Shashi Kapoor), who was hired by Vidya and whom she remembers as a fellow from college, both spend considerable time together. Knowing that Aarti is basically alone, Vinod tries to pursue her. After an intense scuffle, Aarti accidentally kills him. Vidya assists Aarti in disposing of his body. However, a few days later, Sunil comes to Khandala and brings home a man who claims that he has lost his memory. The man is none other than Vinod - and Sunil's diagnosis indicates a gradual recovery for Vinod at the end of which he will regain his memory. The story deepens as Vidya and Aarti try to prevent this from happening.

== Cast ==
- Shashi Kapoor - Vinod Sinha
- Sanjeev Kumar - Dr. Sunil Gupta
- Raakhee - Mrs. Aarti Gupta
- Bindu - Vidya
- Sujit Kumar - Retd Army Major
- Dinesh Hingoo - Bahadur
- Preeti Ganguli - Rosie

== Awards ==
- Nominated, Filmfare Best Actress Award - Raakhee

== Music ==
Song	Singer(s)
"Jeevan Ki Sargam"	Kishore Kumar
"Din Ba Din Woh Mere Dil Se"	Lata Mangeshkar
"Husnwale Kisi Ki Yaar Nahin Hote Hai"	Aziz Naza
