= Vinod Khanna filmography =

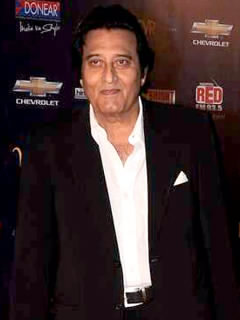
Khanna at the Producers Guild Film Awards in 2012

Vinod Khanna (6 October 1946 – 27 April 2017) was an Indian actor, film producer, director and politician.

== Filmography ==
| Year | Title | Roles | Notes |
|---|---|---|---|
| 1966–1967 | Patthar Ke Insaan | | Shelved film |
| 1969 | Man Ka Meet | Pran | Debut film |
| 1969 | Nateeja | Vinod Singh | |
| 1970 | Sachaa Jhutha | CID Inspector Pradhan | |
| 1970 | Mastana | Inspector Prasad | |
| 1970 | Aan Milo Sajna | Anil Chaudhary | |
| 1970 | Purab Aur Paschim | Shamu | |
| 1971 | Jane-Anjane | Inspector Hemant | |
| 1971 | Elaan | Ram Singh | |
| 1971 | Reshma Aur Shera | Vijay | |
| 1971 | Preetam | Anil | |
| 1971 | Hungama | Preetam | |
| 1971 | Rakhwala | Shyam | |
| 1971 | Mere Apne | Shyam | |
| 1971 | Mera Gaon Mera Desh | Jabbar Singh | |
| 1971 | Memsaab | Arjun Dev | |
| 1971 | Hum Tum Aur Woh | Vijay | |
| 1971 | Dost Aur Dushman | Vinod | |
| 1971 | Guddi | Himself | Cameo |
| 1972 | Ek Hasina Do Diwane | Prakash | |
| 1972 | Sub Ka Saathi | Amar | |
| 1972 | Parchhaiyan | Dilip Khanna / Rakesh | |
| 1972 | Ek Bechara | Shekhar | |
| 1972 | Do Yaar | Raju | |
| 1972 | Ek Khiladi Bawan Pattey | Michael | Cameo |
| 1972 | Parichay | Amit | Cameo |
| 1973 | Kuchhe Dhaage | Thakur Lakhan Singh | |
| 1973 | Dhamkee | CBI inspector | |
| 1973 | Pyaar Ka Rishta | Anil | |
| 1973 | Gaddaar | CBI Inspector Raj Kumar / Raja | |
| 1973 | Anokhi Ada | Gopal | |
| 1973 | Achanak | Major Ranjit Khanna | |
| 1974 | Aarop | Subhash | |
| 1974 | Imtihan | Pramod Sharma | |
| 1974 | Patthar Aur Payal | Surajbhan Singh | |
| 1974 | Haath Ki Safai | Shankar / Kumar Sahab | |
| 1974 | Kunwara Baap | Inspector Ramesh | Cameo |
| 1974 | Sauda | Sunil | |
| 1974 | Farebi | Ranjit | |
| 1974 | Chowkidar | Gopal | |
| 1975 | Zameer | Daaku Suraj Singh/Champoo | |
| 1975 | Qaid | Advocate Jai Saxena | |
| 1975 | Sewak | Mohan | |
| 1975 | Prem Kahani | Sher Khan | Cameo |
| 1976 | Shankar Shambhu | Shambhu / Chhote Thakur / Pappu R. Singh | |
| 1976 | Hera Pheri | Ajay | |
| 1976 | Nehle Pe Dehla | Rahim | |
| 1976 | Lagaam | Bheema | |
| 1977 | Khoon Pasina | Aslam Sher Khan | |
| 1977 | Amar Akbar Anthony | Inspector Amar Khanna | |
| 1977 | Shaque | Vinod Joshi | |
| 1977 | Aap Ki Khatir | Sagar | |
| 1977 | Hatyara | Vijay / Inspector Ajay Singh | |
| 1977 | Parvarish | Kishan Singh | |
| 1977 | Maha Badmaash | Ratan | |
| 1977 | Inkaar | Inspector Amarnath 'Amar' Gill | |
| 1977 | Chor Sipahee | Raja Khanna / Dada | |
| 1977 | Adha Din Adhi Raat | Gopal | |
| 1977 | Jallian Wala Bagh | Amar Choudhary | |
| 1977 | Bombay Movies | Himself | Short film |
| 1978 | Aakhri Daku | Mangal Singh | |
| 1978 | Main Tulsi Tere Aangan Ki | Ajay R. Chouhan | |
| 1978 | Muqaddar Ka Sikandar | Advocate Vishal Anand | |
| 1978 | Khoon Ki Pukaar | Amrit / Sher Singh | |
| 1978 | Khoon Ka Badla Khoon | Amar | |
| 1978 | Daaku Aur Jawan | Ramu | |
| 1979 | Meera | Rana Bhojraj Sesodia | |
| 1979 | Lahu Ke Do Rang | Inspector Raj Singh / Gopi Lathuria | |
| 1979 | Yuvraaj | Gajendra / Prince Vikram Dev | |
| 1979 | Do Shikaari | Satish | Delayed release |
| 1980 | Zalim | Prakash Khanna | |
| 1980 | The Burning Train | Vinod Verma | |
| 1980 | Qurbani | Amar | |
| 1980 | Garam Khoon | Ravi / Johny 'Babloo' | |
| 1980 | Jazbaa | | Shelved film |
| 1980 | Bombay 405 Miles | Kanhaiya | |
| 1981 | Kudrat | Dr. Naresh Gupta | |
| 1981 | Jail Yatra | Raju Verma | |
| 1981 | Khuda Kasam | Sumer Singh | |
| 1981 | Ek Aur Ekk Gyarah | Jamiya | |
| 1982 | Rajput | Bhanupratap 'Bhanu' Singh / Bhavani | |
| 1982 | Insaan | Shankar | |
| 1982 | Raaj Mahal | Prince Vikram Singh | |
| 1982 | Taaqat | Shakti Singh | |
| 1982 | Daulat | Kunwar Dilip Singh | |
| 1983 | Daulat Ke Dushman | Vinod | Delayed release |
| 1986 | Jannat | | Shelved film |
| 1986 | Krishna Arjun | | Shelved film |
| 1986 | Samay | | Shelved film |
| 1987 | Insaaf | Avinash Kapoor | Acting comeback |
| 1987 | Satyamev Jayate | Police Inspector Arjun Singh | |
| 1988 | Rihaee | Amarji | |
| 1988 | Dayavan | Shakti Velu / Dayavan | |
| 1988 | Faisla | Birju | |
| 1988 | Aakhri Adaalat | Inspector Amar Kaushal | |
| 1988 | Akarshan | Himself | Cameo |
| 1989 | Ustaad | Shankar | |
| 1989 | Suryaa: An Awakening | Suraj 'Suryaa' Singh | |
| 1989 | Mahaadev | Arjun Singh | |
| 1989 | Batwara | Vikram Singh | |
| 1989 | Chandni | Lalit Khanna | |
| 1990 | Maha Sangram | Vishal | |
| 1990 | C.I.D. | C.I.D Inspector Veer Sehgal | |
| 1990 | Jurm | Inspector Shekhar Verma | |
| 1990 | Pathar Ke Insan | Arjun | |
| 1990 | Muqaddar Ka Badshaah | Naresh | |
| 1990 | Kaarnama | Suraj | |
| 1991 | Farishtay | Dhirendra 'Dhiru' Kumar | |
| 1991 | Khoon Ka Karz | Karan | |
| 1991 | Dharam Sankat | Birju | |
| 1991 | Lekin... | Samir Niyogi | |
| 1992 | Nishchaiy | Ravi Yadav | |
| 1992 | Humshakal | Inspector Vinod / Sunil Kumar / Dadu Kaliya | |
| 1992 | Waqt Ka Badshah | Vinod | |
| 1992 | Police Aur Mujrim | DSP Vishal Khanna | |
| 1992 | Maarg | Suraj Singh | |
| 1993 | Insaniyat Ke Devta | Balbir | |
| 1993 | Kshatriya | Raja Jaswant Singh | |
| 1993 | Parampara | Thakur Prithvi Singh | |
| 1994 | Pyar Ka Rog | Army Officer | |
| 1994 | Eena Meena Deeka | Deeka | |
| 1994 | Ekka Raja Rani | Vishal 'Vicky' Kapoor | |
| 1995 | Janam Kundli | Randhir 'Junior' Mehra | |
| 1995 | Hulchul | ACP Siddhant Rajvanshi | |
| 1996 | Muqadama | Captain Ajit Singh | |
| 1997 | Himalay Putra | ACP Suraj Khanna | Also producer |
| 1997 | Dhaal | Inspector Varun Saxena | |
| 2001 | Deewaanapan | Ranvir Choudhary | Acting comeback |
| 2002 | Kranti | Awadesh Pratap Singh | |
| 2002 | Leela | Nashaad | |
| 2004 | Bhola in Bollywood | Himself | Cameo |
| 2005 | Pehchaan: The Face of Truth | Advocate Deepak Khanna | |
| 2007 | Risk | Khalid Bin Jamal | Acting comeback |
| 2007 | Godfather | Abdullah Khan / Godfather | Pakistani film |
| 2008 | Halla Bol | Himself | Cameo |
| 2009 | 99 | JC | |
| 2009 | Red Alert: The War Within | Krishnaraj | |
| 2009 | Wanted | Shrikant Shekhawat | |
| 2009 | Fast Forward | Palaash | |
| 2009 | Un hazaaron ke naam | | |
| 2010 | Dabangg | Prajapati Pandey | |
| 2011 | Tell Me O Kkhuda | Abhay Rana Pratap Singh | |
| 2012 | Players | Victor Braganza | |
| 2012 | Dabangg 2 | Prajapati Pandey | |
| 2013 | Ramaiya Vastavaiya | Station Master Shankar | |
| 2014 | Koyelaanchal | Saryu Bhaan Singh | |
| 2015 | Chooriyan | Basant Singh | Punjabi film |
| 2015 | Dilwale | Randhir Bakshi | Last film he acted in |
| 2015 | Downtown | Rajdeep Oberoi | Completed in 2009 |
| 2017 | Ek Thi Rani Aisi Bhi | Maharaja Jiwajirao Scindia | Completed in 2008 |
| 2020 | Guns of Banaras | Guddu's father | Completed in 2014; Posthumous release |

English | 1999 || Together Forever | Dario's Father | On 1960s
