= Sona Mastan Mirza =

Indian actress (died 2014)

- Born: Shahjahan Begum
- Died: August 2014
- Occupation: Actress
- Known for: Badnam Farishte (1971); Kuchhe Dhaage (1973); Meena Kumari Ki Amar Kahani (1979)
- Spouse: Haji Mastan

Shahjahan Begum (died August 2014), also known as Sona or Sona Mastan Mirza, an Indian film actress. She played extra and supporting characters in Hindi-language films during the 1970s, and was particularly noted for her resemblance to Madhubala, whom she portrayed in Meena Kumari Ki Amar Kahani (1979). Sona was the wife of crime gang leader Haji Mastan.

== Life and career ==
Sona was launched as a child artiste by director Bimal Roy. As a child actress, under the screen name Baby Shobha, she appeared in the films Sujata, Ujala (both 1959) and Barsaat Ki Raat (1960). In 1971, she appeared in an adult role in the courtroom drama Badnam Farishte as Kamini / Madhu, a young woman drawn into crime and subsequently defended in court by characters played by Rajesh Khanna and Sharmila Tagore.

In Raj Khosla's Kuchhe Dhaage (1973), Sona played Ramkatori, a nautch girl who is abducted by the dacoit Lakhan Singh, played by Vinod Khanna. The character was based on Putlibai (Gauhar Bano), the concubine of the dacoit Sultan Singh. Sona subsequently appeared in Meena Kumari Ki Amar Kahani (1979), Sohrab Modi's semi-documentary on the life of actress Meena Kumari. Sona portrayed Kumari's contemporary actress Madhubala in the film.

According to Sanjit Narwekar, Sona was subsequently associated with a comedy film project alongside actors Mohan Choti and Aarati, but the film remained incomplete. During her career spanning two decades, Sona primarily appeared in B- and C-grade films and also worked as an extra in larger productions.

== Reception ==
According to film writer Mohan Deep, Sona was among a number of actresses promoted as potential successors to Madhubala following the latter's withdrawal from the film industry in the 1960s. Deep includes Sona alongside Preetibala and Chanchal among actresses whom he characterizes as Madhubala's "clones".

Contemporary reviewers frequently compared Sona's appearance and mannerisms to those of Madhubala. Reviewing Badnam Farishte (1971), a reviewer for Thought noted that Sona's "frontal face" resembled Madhubala's and that she attempted to imitate her laugh, but questioned whether she could match Madhubala's acting ability. A review of Kuchhe Dhaage (1973) in Democratic World similarly remarked that Sona possessed "so many qualities of Madhubala", citing her figure, face, voice and mannerisms, including "the biting of the lower lip", which the reviewer considered "deceptively so at times".

The comparison continued in later assessments of Sona. In its preview of Meena Kumari Ki Amar Kahani (1979), featuring Sona as Madhubala, The Illustrated Weekly of India wrote that the film's success would depend on whether audiences accepted Dolly as Meena Kumari and, "to a lesser extent, Sona as Madhubala". In 1982, T. M. Ramachandran of Film World described Sona as an "extra" whose "coquettish smile", "flirtish eyes" and "beautiful face" recalled Madhubala, while observing that she did not have the same fan following.

== Personal life and death ==
Sona's birth name was Shahjahan Begum. She married crime gang leader Haji Mastan. According to author Chandramohan Puppala, Sona recalled that Mastan was "extremely fond of Madhubala" and that he fell in love with her after seeing her resemblance to the actress. Mastan reportedly financed a few C-grade films featuring Sona, and gifted her a bungalow in Juhu, Maharashtra, near the residence of actor Dev Anand.

Sona died in August 2014. In 2016, Mumbai Mirror reported allegations made by Haseen Mastan Mirza, who identified herself as Sona's daughter, that Sona had concealed her parentage and forcibly arranged her marriage at the age of 12. Haseen's husband denied these claims.

== Filmography ==
- Sujata (1959)
- Ujala (1959)
- Barsaat Ki Raat (1960)
- Badnam Farishte (1971) as Kamini / Madhu
- Kuchhe Dhaage (1973) as Ramkatori
- Bewee Keraye Kee (1975)
- Meena Kumari Ki Amar Kahani (1979) as Madhubala
- Aadamkhor (1986)

== In popular culture ==
In the 2010 film Once Upon A Time in Mumbaai, the character of Rehana (played by Kangana Ranaut) was based on the lives of Sona as well as Madhubala.
