= Kuchhe Dhaage =

- Directed by: Raj Khosla
- Produced by: Raj Khosla
- Starring: Vinod Khanna; Moushumi Chatterjee; Kabir Bedi; Nirupa Roy; Trilok Kapoor
- Music by: Laxmikant–Pyarelal
- Distributed by: Raj Khosla Films
- Release date: 22 June 1973
- Country: India
- Language: Hindi

Kuchhe Dhaage is a 1973 Indian Hindi-language action film directed and produced by Raj Khosla. The film stars Vinod Khanna, Moushumi Chatterjee and Kabir Bedi. The music was scored by Laxmikant Pyarelal with lyrics penned by Anand Bakshi.

== Cast ==
- Vinod Khanna as Thakur Lakhan Singh
- Moushumi Chatterjee as Sona
- Kabir Bedi as Roopa / Pandit Tulsiram
- Trilok Kapoor
- K.N. Singh as Sona's Father
- Nirupa Roy as Thakurain - Lakhan's Mother
- Murad as Judge
- Dev Kumar as Thakur Bahadur Singh
- Bhagwan Dada as Ram Bharose
- Tun Tun as Raswanti Bharose
- Jagdish Raj as Amrutlal
- Ratnamala as Sona's Mother
- Purnima
- Zeb Rehman
- Randhir
- Sona as Ramkatori

== Plot ==
In the state of Madhya Pradesh, India, particularly in the Chambal Ravine there are an abundance of bandit gangs, chiefly consisting of Brahmans and Thakurs, both carrying on their age-old rivalry and hatred for each other from generation to generation. Our story revolves around Brahman Pandit Tulsiram who betrays Thakur Bahadur Singh to the police, and as a result, Bahadur is sentenced to be hanged. Widowed, pregnant and devastated, Bahadur's wife swears that she will raise her child to hunt down and kill Tulsiram at any cost. She gives birth to a son, names him Lakhan, and lets the bandits teach their way of life. As soon as Lakhan grows up, he kills Tulsiram. Hearing of his father's death, army-man, Roopa, resigns and openly swears to kill Lakhan. Unknown to both of them, a beautiful young woman named Sona enters their lives, making them wish that they were living an honest life instead, and both fall head over heels in love with her. Both are on the verge of changing their lives when they find out that the other also has fallen in love with Sona, and they return to their bitter oaths - kill or be killed.

== Song list ==
#	Song	Singer	Length (mins)
1	Zara Se Agar Bewafa	Lata Mangeshkar	3:54
2	Mere Bachpan Tu Ja	Lata Mangeshkar	4:48
3	Ja Re Ja O Deewane	Lata Mangeshkar, Hemlata (Lata Bhatt)	5:11
4	Haye Haye Ek Ladka	Lata Mangeshkar	2:59
5	Kachche Dhaage Ke Saath	Lata Mangeshkar	4:05
