= Vinod Khanna =

Indian film actor, director and politician (1946-2017)

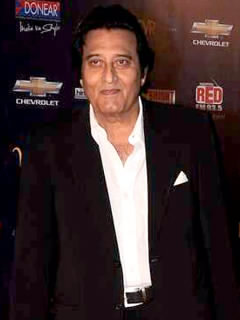
- Khanna in 2012

Union Minister of State for Culture & Tourism
- In office 1 July 2002 – 29 January 2003
- Minister: Jagmohan
- Preceded by: Omak Apang
- Succeeded by: Bhavna Chikhalia

Union Minister of State for External Affairs
- In office 29 January 2003 – 22 May 2004
- Minister: Yashwant Sinha
- Preceded by: Digvijay Singh
- Succeeded by: E. Ahamed

Member of Parliament, Lok Sabha
- In office 16 May 2014 – 27 April 2017
- Preceded by: Pratap Singh Bajwa
- Succeeded by: Sunil Jakhar
- Constituency: Gurdaspur, Punjab
- In office 3 March 1998 – 16 May 2009
- Preceded by: Sukhbuns Kaur
- Succeeded by: Pratap Singh Bajwa
- Constituency: Gurdaspur, Punjab

Personal details
- Born: 6 October 1946 Peshawar, (present-day Khyber Pakhtunkhwa, Pakistan)
- Died: 27 April 2017 (aged 70) Mumbai, Maharashtra, India
- Party: Bharatiya Janata Party
- Spouses: Geetanjali Taleyar (m. 1971; div. 1985); Kavita Daftary (m. 1990)
- Children: 4 (including Akshaye and Rahul)
- Relatives: A. F. S. Talyarkhan (father-in-law); Akhil Kapur (nephew)
- Education: Sydenham College, Mumbai
- Occupation: Actor; politician; film producer
- Awards: Dadasaheb Phalke Award (2017)
- Years active: 1966–2016
- Works: Full list

Vinod Khanna (6 October 1946 – 27 April 2017) was an Indian actor, film producer, and politician known for his work in Hindi cinema. Recognised as a style and fashion icon, he was often referred to as the "Sexy Sanyasi" in the media, as well a sex symbol. He is widely regarded as one of the greatest stars in Indian cinema history. In 2018, Khanna was posthumously honoured with the Dadasaheb Phalke Award, India's highest cinematic award, at the 65th National Film Awards. Beyond his film career, Khanna was also a spiritual seeker.

Khanna made his film debut in 1968 and initially appeared in supporting and antagonistic roles. He portrayed an angry young man in the social drama Mere Apne (1971), the main antagonist in the action drama Mera Gaon Mera Desh (1971), and a military officer turned fugitive in the crime drama Achanak (1973). Khanna emerged as a pivotal figure in 1970s Indian cinema, establishing himself as a leading action hero and box-office magnet who rivaled Amitabh Bachchan's dominance.

From 1974 to 1982, he led in numerous hits, often as one of the highest-paid actors of the era, starred in several blockbusters that bolstered the masala film's popularity. In 1982, at the peak of his career, Khanna took a five-year hiatus from films to follow his spiritual guru, Osho Rajneesh. He returned to the film industry in 1987 with Insaaf and continued to gain hits with films, such as Suryaa (1989) and Chandni (1989). In his later career, he earned acclaim for his portrayals of fatherly figures in highly successful ventures like Wanted (2009), Dabangg (2010), Dabangg 2 (2012) and Dilwale (2015).

Khanna was a notable political figure since late 1990s, serving as a Member of Parliament from the Gurdaspur constituency between 1998–2009 and 2014–2017. He held ministerial positions in the Government of India, including Minister for Culture and Tourism and Minister of State for External Affairs under Prime Minister Atal Bihari Vajpayee.

== Early life and education ==
Khanna was born in a Punjabi Hindu family of the Khatri community to Kamla and Krishanchand Khanna on 6 October 1946, in Peshawar, British India (now in Pakistan). His father was a businessman dealing in textiles, dyes and chemicals while his mother was a housewife. He had three sisters and one brother, Pramod Khanna, who reprised his role for Dabangg 3 (2019), as he had died before its release. Shortly after his birth, India was partitioned and the family left Peshawar and moved to Bombay (present-day Mumbai).

Khanna attended St. Mary's School, Bombay until class II and then transferred to Delhi. In 1957, the family moved to Delhi where he attended Delhi Public School, Mathura Road. Although the family moved back to Bombay in 1960, he was sent to Barnes School in Deolali, near Nashik. During his time at the boarding school Khanna watched the epics Solva Saal and Mughal-e-Azam and fell in love with motion pictures. He graduated with a commerce degree from Sydenham College, Bombay. Khanna loved cricket and had said that "there was a time when I played fair cricket with (Test player) Budhi Kunderan.. but settled for films the moment I realised I couldn't be a Vishwanath! Even so cricket, not films, is my first love," in an interview with The Illustrated Weekly of India in 1979.

== Acting career ==
=== Career beginnings and rise to prominence (1968–1973) ===
Khanna's first film was Adurthi Subba Rao's romantic thriller Man Ka Meet produced by Sunil Dutt and released in 1968. The film performed well at the box office and Khanna, who played a supporting role in the film, was noticed by the audience. His breakthrough came in 1970 when he co-starred alongside Rajesh Khanna in Sachaa Jhutha and Aan Milo Sajna and Manoj Kumar in Purab Aur Paschim, all three of which were blockbusters as well as among the top five highest-grossing films of that year.

He bagged his first leading role in Gulzar's maiden directional venture Mere Apne (1971), which opened to positive response from critics and proved to be a hit. He then played the antagonist in Raj Khosla's action drama Mera Gaon Mera Desh which had Dharmendra and Asha Parekh in the lead. The film made the industry shift to action from romantic films and was an All Time Blockbuster at the box office with Khanna receiving praise for his menacing portrayal of a treacherous bandit. He had another huge hit in Kewal Mishra's actioner Do Yaar, the following year and a highly acclaimed crime drama with Gulzar's Achanak in 1973, based on the K. M. Nanavati v. State of Maharashtra case.

=== Stardom (1974–1982) ===
In 1974, Khanna starred in Prakash Mehra's masala film Haath Ki Safai which also had Randhir Kapoor and Hema Malini in the lead. The film emerged a superhit at the box office and made Khanna a star along with winning him the Filmfare Award for Best Supporting Actor. The huge box office success of Haath Ki Safai was followed by four more successful films, Imtihan and Patthar Aur Payal, the same year, Prem Kahani (in which he had a small role) and Qaid, the next year.

Khanna reached his peak in the late-1970s. In 1976, he reunited with Prakash Mehra for another masala film Hera Pheri co-starring Amitabh Bachchan, Saira Banu and Sulakshana Pandit. The film went on to become a blockbuster and earned him a nomination in the Filmfare Award for Best Supporting Actor category. He then delivered two more major successes with Chand's and Raj Khosla's actioners, Shankar Shambhu and Nehle Pe Dehla, respectively. 1977 proved to be the best year of his career with many successful films. His first release was the action crime film Khoon Pasina alongside Bachchan and Rekha, which proved to be a superhit. His second release was Manmohan Desai's multi-starrer masala film Amar Akbar Anthony. It opened to thunderous response from the audience, eventually doing more business than Khanna's last big hit Khoon Pasina and emerging a massive blockbuster as well as the highest grossing film of that year. Its soundtrack composed by Laxmikant–Pyarelal dominated the musical charts and was the seventh best-selling Hindi film album of the 1970s. He then appeared in Aap Ki Khatir, Shaque and Hatyara. While the first two were semi-hits, Hatyara was a superhit at the box office. For his portrayal of a man accused of multiple homicides in Shaque, Khanna received his first nomination in the Filmfare Award for Best Actor category. He once again reunited with Bachchan and Manmohan Desai for the crime drama film Parvarish. This one too like their previous ventures was a blockbuster and one of the highest earners of 1977. Before the end of year, he had another superhit with Raj N. Sippy's crime thriller Inkaar, which was a remake of Japanese film High and Low, followed by three more successful films, Maha Badmaash, Chor Sipahee and Adha Din Adhi Raat. Khanna's dream continued in 1978 with back-to-back mega blockbusters in Raj Khosla's women-oriented drama Main Tulsi Tere Aangan Ki and Prakash Mehra's magnum opus, the action crime drama Muqaddar Ka Sikandar. The music of Muqaddar Ka Sikandar was a chartbuster and the sixth best-selling Hindi film album of the 1970s. The huge box office success of these two films was followed by Khoon Ki Pukaar, Khoon Ka Badla Khoon and Sarkari Mehmaan, all three of which were fair runners. He concluded the year with Sunil Dutt's actioner Daaku Aur Jawan co-starring Dutt, Reena Roy and Leena Chandavarkar. It did very well at the box office and proved to be a superhit.

In 1979, he delivered a moderate success with Mahesh Bhatt's fourth directional venture Lahu Ke Do Rang, but his other releases, such as Meera and Yuvraaj failed to do well. The following year, he appeared in two big-budget actioners, Ravi Chopra's The Burning Train co-starring Dharmendra, Jeetendra, Hema Malini and Parveen Babi in the lead and Feroz Khan's Qurbani alongside Khan and Zeenat Aman. The former opened to bumper response, but collections fell afterwards and was given a "below average" verdict by the end of its run; however, it gained cult status in later years. Khanna's other big venture Qurbani also opened to massive response and emerged a blockbuster as well as the highest grosser of the year with Khanna receiving praise for his performance along with his second and final nomination in the Filmfare Award for Best Actor category. Its soundtrack composed by Kalyanji–Anandji and Biddu was popular, with its songs like "Aap Jaisa Koi", "Laila O Laila" and "Hum Tumhe Chahte Hain" topping the musical charts and making it the sixth best-selling Hindi film album of the 1980s. In 1981, he again collaborated with Rajesh Khanna and Hema Malini for Chetan Anand's reincarnation drama Kudrat. In spite of presence of some of the biggest stars of that time and its soundtrack being one of the best-selling Hindi film albums of the 1980s, Kudrat was rejected at ticket counters and proved to be a flop. Khanna's other releases that year, such as Jail Yatra, Khuda Kasam and Ek Aur Ek Gyarah met the same fate. This changed in 1982 as he had a string of successful films with Rajput, Insaan and Taaqat. The year also marked Khanna's hiatus from the film industry as he took a spiritual break and moved to Rajneeshpuram in the United States, eventually staying there for five years.

=== Comeback and further works (1987–2015) ===
After a five year hiatus, Khanna returned to films with Mukul Anand's successful actioner Insaaf which also had Dimple Kapadia in the lead. The following year, however all of his films, including biggies Dayavan and Aakhri Adaalat failed to leave a mark. In 1989, his first release was Esmayeel Shroff's action film Suryaa: An Awakening, which performed well commercially and proved to be a hit venture. Khanna then appeared in Yash Chopra's romantic musical Chandni co-starring Sridevi and Rishi Kapoor. The film opened to excellent audience response and emerged a blockbuster at the box office. Its soundtrack composed by Shiv–Hari was one of the best-selling Hindi film albums of the 1980s. Chandni won National Film Award for Best Popular Film Providing Wholesome Entertainment and Khanna received his final nomination in the Filmfare Award for Best Supporting Actor category.

With the advent of the 1990s, Khanna's star power began to wane. From 1990 to 1996, only two of his films proved to be box office successes, which were - T. Rama Rao's Muqaddar Ka Badshaah (1990) and K. C. Bokadia's Police Aur Mujrim (1992). During this phase, his final collaboration with Gulzar took place for the mystery film Lekin... (1991), which again had Dimple Kapadia opposite him. Although the film underperformed commercially, it was a major critical success and went on to win five awards at the 38th National Film Awards. In 1997, he launched and co-starred alongside his son Akshaye Khanna in Himalay Putra, which opened to lukewarm response and flopped at the box office. Khanna received Filmfare Lifetime Achievement Award in 1999. Beginning from 2001, he played supporting roles to critical acclaim in films, such as Deewaanapan (2001), Kranti (2002) and Risk (2007).

In 2009, Khanna appeared in Raj & DK's crime comedy film 99 and Prabhu Deva's action thriller Wanted. Both the films opened to positive reception and emerged commercially successful, especially the latter which did a lifetime business of ₹93.23 crore. This was followed by back-to-back blockbusters in Dabangg (2010) and its sequel, Dabangg 2 (2012), both having Salman Khan and Sonakshi Sinha in the lead roles. He then played supporting roles in Ramaiya Vastavaiya (2013), Koyelaanchal (2014) and Dilwale (2015). While the former two didn't perform well at the box office, Dilwale emerged a commercial success grossing ₹376.85 crore worldwide. The last film to feature Khanna was Sekhar Suri's much delayed action film Guns of Banaras (2020), which released almost three years after his death.

== Political career ==
In 1997, Khanna joined the Bharatiya Janata Party and was elected from Gurdaspur constituency in Punjab in the next year's Lok Sabha poll. In 1999, he was re-elected to the Lok Sabha from the same constituency. Later, he became Union Minister for Culture and Tourism in July 2002. Six months later, he was moved to the Ministry of External Affairs (MEA) as Minister of State. In 2004 he won re-election from Gurdaspur. However, Khanna lost out in the 2009 general elections. In the 2014 general election he was again elected for the 16th Lok Sabha from the same constituency. He also served as Union minister of state for tourism and culture, as well as external affairs.

=== Complaint alleging "provocative" political messaging ===
In 2014, the Indian National Congress filed a formal complaint with the Election Commission alleging that Khanna and a colleague had circulated "highly inflammatory and provocative" messages through social media to incite communal tension and further his electoral prospects, and sought legal action including potential disqualification from contesting the polls.

=== Intra-party controversy over candidature (posthumous) ===
In 2019, after Khanna’s death, his widow publicly stated that she felt "hurt" and "abandoned" when the Bharatiya Janata Party chose not to offer her its nomination for the Gurdaspur Lok Sabha seat that her husband had represented for multiple terms, a decision that sparked media discussion and criticism within party circles.

== Personal life ==
=== Relationships and family ===
Khanna met his first wife Gitanjali Taleyar in college. She was the daughter of A. F. S. Talyarkhan, the first Indian cricket commentator in the early 1950s. Khanna married Gitanjali in 1971 and had two sons with her, Rahul and Akshaye; both became Bollywood actors. Khanna and Gitanjali settled for a divorce in 1985.

In 1990, upon returning to India, Khanna married Kavita Daftary, daughter of industrialist Sharayu Daftary. They had a son and a daughter.

=== Spirituality ===
Khanna always considered himself spiritual, owing to his family background as well his discovery of Paramahansa Yogananda's 1946 book Autobiography of a Yogi he read while still in college.

In 1975, he became a disciple of Osho and in the early 1980s, moved to Rajneeshpuram, Osho's religious community in Oregon, United States. Among his activities, Khanna would practice meditation and be Osho's gardener. Taking the name "Swami Vinod Bharti", Khanna would live a spiritual life for some five years before abandoning it, eventually growing disillusioned with spirituality, writing that "I realised that spirituality was meant for rich people who loved to indulge in things and phenomena that are absolutely impractical."

== Illness and death ==
Khanna was hospitalised at Sir H.N. Reliance Foundation Hospital and Research Centre in Girgaon, Mumbai, on 2 April 2017 for a few weeks after suffering from severe dehydration. He died at 11:20 a.m. (IST) on 27 April, and it was revealed that he had been battling advanced bladder cancer. Prime Minister Narendra Modi tweeted "Will always remember Vinod Khanna as a popular actor, dedicated leader and a wonderful human. Pained by his demise. My condolences". He was cremated at the Worli Crematorium on the same day.

== Artistry and legacy ==
Known for his acting and style, Khanna was considered one of the most good-looking artists of his time and excelled in both commercial and art-house films. His villanious roles gave him enough recognition. Director Manmohan Desai said, “Vinod was never a supporting actor in the Amitabh Bachchan starrers. In my films he had a parallel role to Amitabh. Vinod is full hero material." Bhawana Somaaya of TheQuint wrote, "His solid screen presence ensured that irrespective of whether his role was positive or negative, he was noticed in all his films." Times Now placed Khanna 3rd in its list of the “Most Good Looking Actors on Indian Screen".

One of the highest paid actors from the 1970s to the early 1980s, Khanna appeared in Box Office India's "Top Actors" list three times from 1977 to 1979. In 2022, he was placed in Outlook India's "75 Best Bollywood Actors" list.

Although Vinod Khanna enjoyed major success as both a leading man and screen villain, several critics have highlighted limitations in his acting style and screen presence. A detailed analysis in The Quint argued that he "was not an electrifying screen presence", that "his mere appearance on the screen did not enliven the audience", and that his facial expressions were comparatively limited, also lacking the voice, vocal dynamism and modulation (especially in dialogue delivery), charisma, and comic timing of contemporaries like Amitabh Bachchan and Dharmendra. The same article noted that his strengths lay more in sincerity of effort than in innate dramatic range or acting abilities.

On his death, Amitabh Bachchan said, "No one walked the way he did.. no one had the presence he had in a crowded room.. no one could lighten up the surroundings he was in like him." Akshay Kumar called his demise "an end of an era".

== Awards and nominations ==
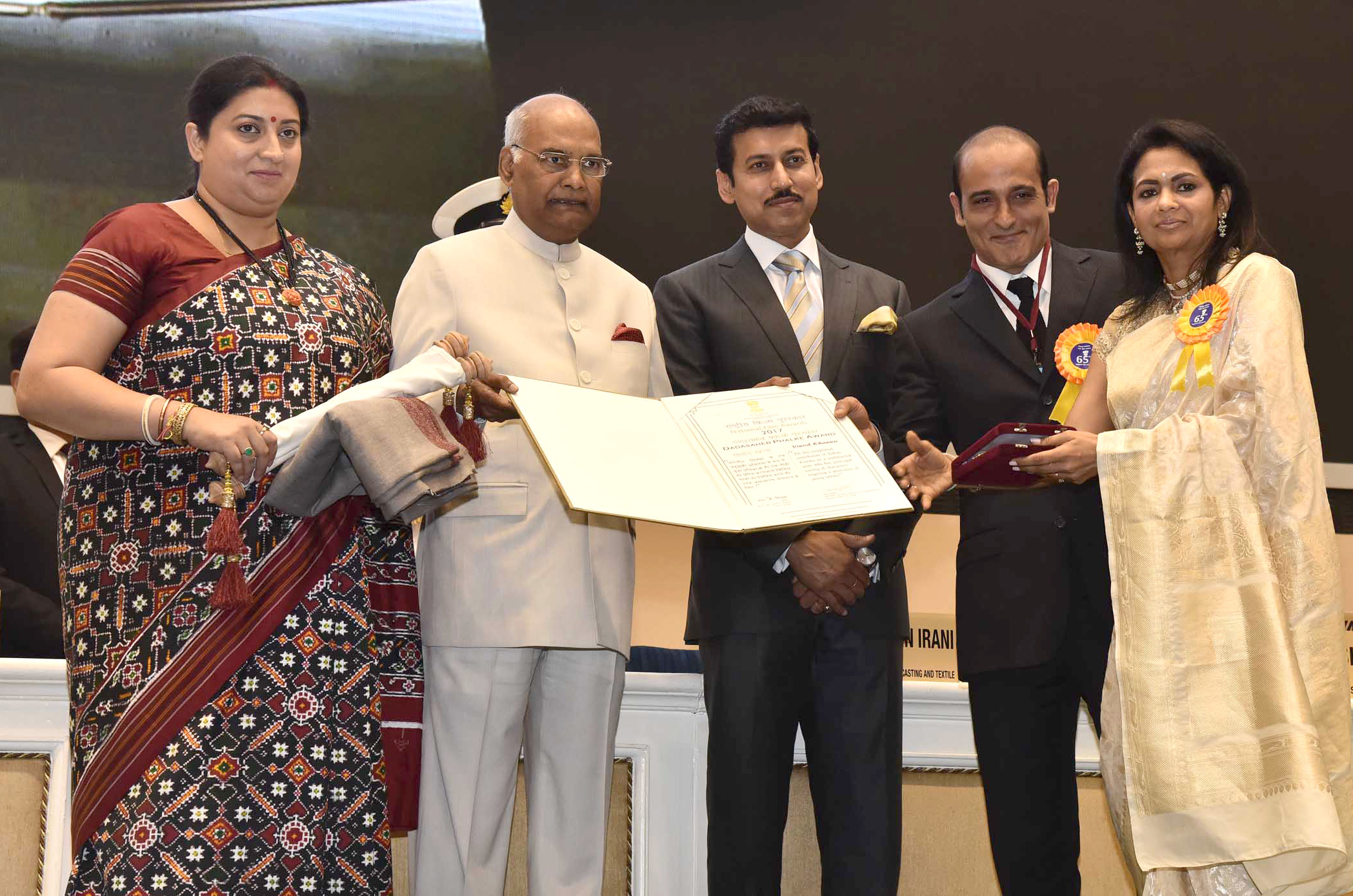
President Kovind presenting the Dadasaheb Phalke Award of Sh. Khanna posthumously to his wife and son Akshaye Khanna at the 65th National Film Awards on 3 May 2018.

- 1975 – Filmfare Award for Best Supporting Actor for Haath Ki Safai
- 1977 – Nominated – Filmfare Award for Best Supporting Actor for Hera Pheri
- 1977 – Nominated – Filmfare Award for Best Actor for Shaque
- 1979 – Nominated – Filmfare Award for Best Supporting Actor for Muqaddar Ka Sikander
- 1981 – Nominated – Filmfare Award for Best Actor for Qurbani
- 1990 – Nominated – Filmfare Award for Best Supporting Actor for Chandni
- 1999 – Filmfare Lifetime Achievement Award
- 2005 – Stardust Awards – Role Model for the Year
- 2007 – Zee Cine Award for Lifetime Achievement
- 2017 – Dadasaheb Phalke Award (posthumously).

Lok Sabha
Preceded by Sukhbuns Kaur	Member of Parliament for Gurdaspur; 1998–2009	Succeeded by Pratap Singh Bajwa
Preceded by Pratap Singh Bajwa	Member of Parliament for Gurdaspur; 2014–2017	Succeeded by Sunil Kumar Jakhar
