= Sunny (1984 film) =

- Theatrical release poster
- Directed by: Raj Khosla
- Screenplay by: Bobby Tappia
- Dialogues by: Dr. Rahi Masoom Raza
- Story by: Bobby Tappia
- Produced by: Amar Jeet
- Starring: Sunny Deol; Amrita Singh; Sharmila Tagore; Waheeda Rehman; Dharmendra (special appearance)
- Cinematography: Pratap Sinha
- Edited by: Waman Bhonsle; Gurudutt Shirali
- Music by: R. D. Burman
- Production company: Nalanda Arts
- Release date: 28 September 1984
- Country: India
- Language: Hindi

Sunny is a 1984 Indian film directed by Raj Khosla. The film stars Sunny Deol, Amrita Singh, Sharmila Tagore, Waheeda Rehman and Dharmendra (special appearance). This is the first film where Dharmendra played on-screen father to his real life son Sunny Deol. Director Raj Khosla and actress Waheeda Rehman worked together after 26 years since their feud during the shooting of 1958 film Solva Saal.

== Plot ==
Wealthy businessman Inderjit marries a lovely woman named Gayatri, but is unhappy with this marriage, as she is unable to bear him any children. He starts frequenting brothels, where he meets with an attractive courtesan by the name of Sitara. Both fall in love and Sitara becomes pregnant after they get intimate. When Gayatri finds out about their affair, she is enraged and will do anything in her power to prevent Sitara continuing to dominate Inderjit's love. Before she could take any steps, Inderjit dies in a plane accident, leaving Sitara alone and pregnant. Gayatri conspires against Sitara, invites her over, makes sure she gives birth, then tells her that the child was still-born. A devastated Sitara leaves to continue with her life, leaving Gayatri to bring up her son, Sunny, as her own. Years later, Sunny has grown up, has met with an attractive young woman named Amrita, who he would like to marry. When Gayatri finds out, she is initially happy, but relents when she finds out that Amrita is a dancer and singer on TV, and decides to oppose this marriage at all costs. But when Sunny adamantly refuses to marry anyone else, she permits Amrita's parents to meet with them. It is this meeting that will change everything in Gayatri and Sunny's lives forever, since Amrita is Sitara's niece.

== Cast ==
- Sunny Deol as Sunny – Inderjit and Sitara’s son
- Amrita Singh as Amrita – Sunny’s girlfriend
- Sharmila Tagore as Sitara – Inderjit’s love interest, Sunny’s mother
- Waheeda Rehman as Gayatri – Inderjit’s wife, Sunny’s adoptive mother
- Dharmendra (special appearance) as Inderjit – Sunny’s father

== Music and soundtrack ==
The music of the film was composed by R. D. Burman and the lyrics were penned by Anand Bakshi.

Song	Singer
"Jaane Kya Baat Hai"	Lata Mangeshkar
"Meri Yaad Aayegi, Aati Rahegi, Meri Jaan Jayegi, Jati Rahegi"	Lata Mangeshkar, Suresh Wadkar
"Teri Yaad Tera Naam Aur Nahin Kuch Kaam Hum Deewanon Ka"	Anuradha Paudwal, Suresh Wadkar
"Hum Aashiq Hai, Mit Jayenge Par Ishq Se Baaz Na Aayenge"	Anand Kumar, Suresh Wadkar
"Aur Kya Ahd-E-Wafa" (Male)	Suresh Wadkar
"Aur Kya Ahd-E-Wafa" (Female)	Asha Bhosle
