= Meraa Dost Meraa Dushman =

- Poster
- Directed by: Raj Khosla
- Produced by: Johny Bakshi
- Starring: Sanjeev Kumar; Shatrughan Sinha; Smita Patil; Danny Denzongpa; Johnny Walker
- Music by: Laxmikant–Pyarelal
- Release date: 1984
- Country: India
- Language: Hindi

Meraa Dost Meraa Dushman (transl. My friend my foe) is a 1984 Indian Bollywood action film directed by Raj Khosla and produced by Johny Bakshi. It stars Sanjeev Kumar, Shatrughan Sinha, Smita Patil in pivotal roles. The music was composed by Laxmikant-Pyarelal.

== Cast ==
- Sanjeev Kumar as Goli Chacha
- Shatrughan Sinha as Shakti Singh
- Smita Patil as Lali
- Danny Denzongpa as Shaitan Singh
- Johnny Walker as Mulayam Singh
- Mukri as Harkishan
- Master Bhagwan as Bhiku
- Trilok Kapoor as Bahadur Singh
- Indrani Mukherjee as Janki
- Geeta Behl as Kesar / Phoolwati
- Shivraj as Bandit
- Vikas Anand as Bandit

== Music ==
Lyrics: Anand Bakshi

Song	Singer
"Ektara Jogi Aaya"	Kishore Kumar
"Kaise Bedardi Se Aankh Ladi Re, Ram Kasam Mushkil Mein"	Kishore Kumar, Asha Bhosle
"Goli Chacha Ko Salaam Karo"	Suresh Wadkar
"Kya Isi Ka Naam Jawani Hai"	Asha Bhosle
"Jawani Cheez Badi"	Asha Bhosle
