= Daasi (1981 film) =

- Poster
- Directed by: Raj Khosla
- Written by: Suraj Sanim
- Produced by: Subhash Verma
- Starring: Rekha; Sanjeev Kumar; Moushumi Chatterjee; Rakesh Roshan; Leela Mishra
- Music by: Ravindra Jain
- Production company: Gaurav International Productions
- Release date: 26 June 1981
- Running time: 138 minutes
- Country: India
- Language: Hindi

Daasi (transl. The Maid Servant) is a 1981 Indian Hindi-language drama film directed by Raj Khosla and produced by Subhash Verma. The film stars Sanjeev Kumar, Rekha, Moushumi Chatterjee, and Rakesh Roshan. The film's music is by Ravindra Jain. The film was released on 26 June 1981. It was one of several films by Khosla centred around the character of the other woman.

== Plot ==
The story of the film revolves around an orphaned girl Mangla who faces one heartbreak after another.

== Cast ==
- Rekha as Tara
- Sanjeev Kumar as Anand
- Moushumi Chatterjee as Mangala / Daasi
- Leela Mishra as Mangala's aunt
- Rakesh Roshan as Anoop
- Paintal (comedian) as Kamal

== Production ==
The film was shot in 1980. Rekha left the film to shoot for Silsila and returned to dub for Daasi right afterwards.

== Themes ==
Daasi was one of several films by Khosla centred around the character of the other woman. Like Khosla's previous film Main Tulsi Tere Aangan Ki, the male character is seen to be torn between the wife and lover. Caste hierarchy is also a key theme in the film.

== Soundtrack ==
Songs of the film were written and composed by Ravindra Jain. Two songs ' Premi Sabhi Hote Hai' & ' Bindiya Jagaye Bindiya' composed by Rajesh Roshan

Title	Singer(s)
"Piya Bin Jiya Nahi Lage Nahi Lage"	Bhupinder Singh
"Premi Sabhi Hote Hain"	Kishore Kumar, Lata Mangeshkar
"Purani Chilmane Utha Koi Naya Salam Le"	Asha Bhosle
"Log Kahte Hai Main Ek Fankar Hu"	Bhupinder Singh
"Andheri Raat Mein Aye The Jo Shama Banke"	N/A
"Kitna Hai Khubsurat Logo Ka Ye Bahana"	Asha Bhosle
"Bindiya Jagaye Bindiya Jgaye Ho Rama"	Manna Dey
"Palkan Se Margh Jharun"	Ravindra Jain

== Reception ==
The film did not do well at the box office.
