= Meena Kumari Ki Amar Kahani =

1979 Indian semi-documentary film

- Theatrical release poster
- Directed by: Sohrab Modi
- Produced by: Sham Chawla
- Starring: Sona; Dolly; Madhu Malini; Meena Irani; Jagdeep; Keshto Mukherjee; Jayshree T.
- Release date: 1979
- Country: India
- Language: Hindi

Meena Kumari Ki Amar Kahani (lit. 'The Unforgettable Story of Meena Kumari') is a 1979 Indian Hindi-language semi-documentary film directed by Sohrab Modi and produced by Sham Chawla. The film chronicles the life and career of the prominent Hindi film actress Meena Kumari (1933–1972). Uniquely for a mainstream Indian cinematic release of its era, the film was noted for not according significant weight to its music.

== Cast ==
According to Screen World Publication's 75 Glorious Years of Indian Cinema (1988), the cast includes:

- Sona as Madhubala
- Dolly
- Madhu Malini
- Meena Irani
- Jagdeep
- Keshto Mukherjee
- Jayshree T.

== Production ==
The Hindi magazine Dharmayug reported in 1978 that production had commenced that year. The film's muhurat shot was attended by Kumari's contemporary stars, including Nargis, Dilip Kumar, and Saira Banu.

In 1979, Cine Blitz reported that the film was being "shot in complete secrecy" and alleged that Kumari's husband, filmmaker Kamal Amrohi, had initially attempted to interfere with the production.

The project featured actress Sona, a lookalike of Madhubala who later married gangster Haji Mastan. Sona portrayed Madhubala in the film.

== Reception and legacy ==
In a contemporary review from 1979, the news magazine Link criticized the film for prioritizing Kumari's professional milestones over her personal life, noting, "SOHRAB Modi's Meena Kumari Ki Amar Kahani is, unfortunately, not quite Meena Kumari's story but the story of her legend." Director Sohrab Modi later acknowledged that the film was a commercial failure.

In her 2003 book The Cinematic Imagination: Indian Popular Films as Social History, film scholar Jyotika Virdi noted that the semi-documentary relied heavily on Kumari's professional career to obscure her personal "scandals", arguing that the film attempted to monumentalize Kumari by sanitizing her legacy.

In 2016, original posters and other rare memorabilia from Meena Kumari Ki Amar Kahani were featured publicly at the Womanhood Festival in Mumbai.
