= Do Raaste =

1969 Indian film produced by Raj Khosla

- Directed by: Raj Khosla
- Written by: Chandrakant Kakodkar; G. R. Kamat; Akhtar Romani
- Produced by: Raj Khosla
- Starring: Rajesh Khanna; Mumtaz; Balraj Sahni; Prem Chopra; Bindu
- Cinematography: V. Gopi Krishna
- Edited by: Waman Bhonsle
- Music by: Laxmikant-Pyarelal
- Distributed by: Raj Khosla Films
- Release date: 5 December 1969
- Country: India
- Language: Hindi
- Box office: est. ₹6.59 crore (equivalent to ₹373 crore or US$40 million in 2026)

Do Raaste (translation: Two Paths) is a 1969 Indian Hindi film directed by Raj Khosla. The story is based on the trials and tribulations of a lower-middle-class family. It places emphasis on respect for elders, the paramount status of the mother, the sanctity of the joint family of her three sons, and the supremacy of relations that are stronger than ties of blood.

Balraj Sahni and Kamini Kaushal play the eldest son and his wife. Prem Chopra plays the wayward son with Bindu as his wife who creates disputes. Whereas Rajesh Khanna plays flamboyant son and Mumtaz as his love interest. Despite her small role but with the aid of two chartbuster songs, Do Raaste made Mumtaz a household name.

The story was based on the trials and tribulations of a lower-middle-class family. It placed emphasis on respect for elders, the paramount status of the mother, the sanctity of the joint family and the supremacy of relations that are stronger than ties of blood.

== Cast ==
- Rajesh Khanna as Satyen Prasad Gupta
- Mumtaz as Reena Alopee Prasad
- Balraj Sahni as Navendra Prasad Gupta "Navendu"
- Prem Chopra as Birju Prasad Gupta
- Kamini Kaushal as Madhvi Gupta
- Veena as Mrs. Gupta (Satyen's mother)
- Bindu as Neela Alopee Prasad Gupta (Mrs. Birju Gupta)
- Asit Sen as Alopee Prasad
- Leela Mishra as Mrs. Alopee Prasad
- Mehmood Jr. as Raju Gupta
- Jayant as Khan

== Soundtrack ==
Do Raaste

Soundtrack album
- Genre: Feature film soundtrack

The music for all the songs were composed by Laxmikant Pyarelal and the lyrics were penned by Anand Bakshi. Three more revival tracks were added to the 1969 soundtrack album reviving old songs with newer music. The tracks are as follows:

#	Title	Singer(s)	Duration
1	"Mere Naseeb Mein Ae Dost"	Kishore Kumar	04:43
2	"Bindiya Chamkegi"	Lata Mangeshkar	05:45
3	"Yeh Reshmi Zulfen"	Mohammed Rafi	05:16
4	"Chup Gaye Saare Nazaare" (Dil Ne Dil Ko Pukara)	Lata Mangeshkar, Mohammed Rafi	05:36
5	"Do Rang Duniya Ke Aur Do Raaste"	Mukesh	04:19
6	"Apni Apni Biwi Pe Sab Ko Ghuroor Hain"	Lata Mangeshkar	03:36
7	"Yeh Reshmi Zulfen" (Revival)	Mohammed Rafi	05:21
8	"Dil Ne Dil Ko Pukara" (Revival)	Lata Mangeshkar, Mohammed Rafi	05:31
9	"Bindiya Chamkegi" (Revival)	Lata Mangeshkar	04:55
10	Title Music (Classical Instrumental)		02:11

== Box office ==
The film became a blockbuster at the box office. This film is counted among the 17 consecutive hit films of Rajesh Khanna between 1969 and 1971, by adding the two-hero films Marayada and Andaz to the 15 consecutive solo hits.

In India, the film grossed ₹65 million (US$8.59 million). This made it the second highest-grossing film of 1969 at the Indian box office, behind Aradhana.

Overseas in the United Kingdom, the film was released in 1970. It became the first Indian film to gross £100,000 in the UK, equivalent to ₹900,000 (US$118,940.64). Its UK box office record was broken a year later by Purab Aur Paschim, which released in the UK in 1971.

In total, the film grossed an estimated ₹65.9 million (US$8.71 million) in India and the United Kingdom.

== Awards and nominations ==
18th Filmfare Awards:
Won

- Best Story – Chandrakant Kakodkar

Nominated

- Best Film – Raj Khosla
- Best Director – Raj Khosla
- Best Supporting Actress – Bindu
- Best Music Director – Laxmikant Pyarelal
- Best Lyricist – Anand Bakshi for "Bindiya Chamkegi"
- Best Female Playback Singer – Lata Mangeshkar for "Bindiya Chamkegi"
