= Badnam Farishte =

- Lobby card
- Directed by: Qamar Narvi
- Starring: Rajesh Khanna; Sharmila Tagore; Yash Tandon; B. N. Sharma; Sona; Bharat Kapoor; Pinchoo Kapoor
- Music by: N. Datta
- Release date: 12 November 1971
- Country: India
- Language: Hindi

Badnam Farishte (lit. 'Notorious Angels') is a 1971 Bollywood court drama film. The film has Rajesh Khanna and Sharmila Tagore as lawyers who fight for unemployed youth who had gotten into the crime world. These two actors made extended guest appearances in this film. The introduction commentary was done by Dharmendra. The cast included mostly the newcomers and struggling artistes of that time.

== Plot ==
Two lawyers, Prakash and Renu, defend a group of unemployed youths who have drifted into a life of crime.

== Cast ==
- Rajesh Khanna as Lawyer Prakash (special appearance)
- Sharmila Tagore as Lawyer Renu (special appearance)
- Sona as Kamini / Madhu
- Amrit Patel
- Arvind Rathod as Sudheer
- Atam Prakash
- Bharat Kapoor as Ganesh
- Yash Tandon as Rajnish
- Anwar Hussain as Gunda
- Pinchoo Kapoor as Judge
- Shivraj
- Kabir Kumar
- Nandini Desai
- N. N. Shukla
- Rajan Chawla
- Nazir Kashmiri
- Dharmendra – opening commentary (special appearance)

== Soundtrack ==
The film's music was composed by N. Dutta and penned by Asad Bhopali.

1. "Na Saathi Hai Na Manzil Ka Pata, Ye Duniya Raasta Hi Raasta Hai" – Asha Bhosle
2. "Aaj Ka Vaada Pakka Haath Milao, Ab Mai Jaau Achchha Haath Milao" – Mahendra Kapoor, Asha Bhosle
3. "Insaan Ro Raha Hai, Badnam Farishte Kya Kare" – Mohammed Rafi
4. "B.a. M.a. Ph.d Ye Diplome Ye Degree Hogayi Jab Bekaar" – Mohammed Rafi
5. "Nashili Aankho Se Nagar Sa Ek Baras Ke Dub Gayi Masti Me Meri Nas Nas" – Asha Bhosle
