= Khuda Kasam (1981 film) =

- Directed by: Lekh Tandon
- Screenplay by: Abrar Alvi
- Story by: Lekh Tandon
- Produced by: Baldev Pushkarna
- Starring: Vinod Khanna; Tina Munim
- Cinematography: Jehangir Choudhary
- Edited by: Prabhakar Supare
- Music by: Laxmikant–Pyarelal
- Release date: 9 October 1981
- Country: India
- Language: Hindi

Khuda Kasam is a 1981 Indian Hindi-language film directed by Lekh Tandon and produced by Baldev Pushkarna. The film stars Vinod Khanna, Tina Munim in lead roles, along with Pran, Ajit, Madan Puri, Shakti Kapoor, Nazneen, Kamini Kaushal in pivotal roles. Dharmendra was in a special appearance here. The music was composed by Laxmikant-Pyarelal.

== Cast ==
- Vinod Khanna as Sumer Singh
- Tina Munim as Tina
- Pran as Ranveer Singh / Girdharilal
- Ajit as Raizada Hukamchand
- Madan Puri as Kishanlal
- Shakti Kapoor as Khanna
- Nazneen as Geeta Singh
- Kamini Kaushal as Nirmala Singh
- Dharmendra as Maharaja Bhunam
- Jalal Agha as Pancham
- C.S. Dubey as Pandit
- Chandrashekhar as Inspector
- Surendra Pal as Chouhan, World Airways Representative
- Zahira as Lathika
- Pinchoo Kapoor as Hotel Customer

== Songs ==
Lyrics: Majrooh Sultanpuri

Song	Singer	Ref.
"Are Re Re Sambhalo"	Mohammed Rafi	
"Aap Ne Yeh Kya Keh Diya, Ke Hone Laga"	Mohammed Rafi, Asha Bhosle	
"Kachchi Kali Gulab Ki"	Asha Bhosle (with Rafi)	
"Pyar Ne Di Awaaz"	Asha Bhosle	
"Zara Thehar Jao"	Suman Kalyanpur	
