= Khoon Ka Badla Khoon =

- Directed by: Kalpataru
- Produced by: Ratan Mohan
- Starring: Vinod Khanna
- Music by: O.P. Nayyar; S.H. Bihari (lyrics)
- Distributed by: R. M. Art productions
- Release date: 1978
- Country: India
- Language: Hindi

Khoon Ka Badla Khoon is a 1978 Bollywood action film directed by K. Parvez alias Kalpataru and produced by Ratan Mohan.

== Plot ==
This is the story of two brothers, separated long ago, are reunited and destroy their enemies.

== Cast ==
- Vinod Khanna as Amar
- Mahendra Sandhu as Ajay Kumar
- Asha Sachdev as Asha
- Ajit as Al fanzo
- Bindu as Ranjit's associate
- Jayshree T. as Munnibai
- Padma Khanna as Julie
- Purnima as Mrs. Kotwal
- Iftekhar as Commissioner Kotwal
- Mohan Choti as Abdul
- Imtiaz Khan as Rnjit
- P. Jairaj as CBI Officer Saxena
- Viju Khote as Seth Popatlal
- Shetty Al Fanzo's goon
- Sudhir Number 1
- Arpana Choudhary as Arpana

== Music ==
S. H. Bihari wrote all songs except "Aji Hoga Kya Aage Janaab" (Ram Bhardwaj)

- "Badan Gora Haseen Jalwe Tumko Deewaana Meri Jaan" (Vani Jayaram)
- "Ghar Apna Bangaal Aur Bambai Mein Hai Sasuraal" (Pushpa Pagdhare, Uttara Kelkar, Vani Jayaram)
- "Gham Yateemon Ke Jaisa Bhi Sansaar Main Koi Bachcha" (Uttara Kelkar, Vani Jayaram)
- "Kisko Gale Lagaaye Dil Kiska Todiye" (Vani Jayaram)
- "Pyaar Bhara Kajara Aankhiyon Mein Daal Ke" (Pushpa Pagdhare, Uttara Kelkar, Vani Jayaram)
- "Aji Hoga Kya Aage Janaab" (Mohammed Rafi, Vani Jayaram)
- "Zulf Lehraayi To Saawan Ka Mahina Aa Gaya" (Vani Jayaram)
