= Suryaa: An Awakening =

- Film poster
- Directed by: Esmayeel Shroff
- Produced by: Vijay P. Mehta
- Starring: Raaj Kumar; Vinod Khanna; Bhanupriya; Raj Babbar
- Cinematography: Russi Billimoria
- Edited by: A. R. Rajendran
- Music by: Laxmikant–Pyarelal
- Release date: 10 February 1989
- Country: India
- Language: Hindi

Suryaa: An Awakening (Hindi: सूर्या: एक जागृति, pronounced Soorya: Ek Jaagrti) is a 1989 Indian Hindi-language action film directed by Esmayeel Shroff. The film stars Raaj Kumar, Vinod Khanna, Bhanupriya, Raj Babbar in lead roles. It was a financial success.

== Plot ==
In the small community of Sargaon (Shikarpur) in rural India, Pt. Gangadhar Choudhary rules with an iron fist, forbidding anyone from speaking out against him. He owns most of the land surrounding his palatial home, save for a small patch of land owned by Veer Singh.

One day, he summons Veer to his house and offers to buy his land for a substantial sum of money, but Veer refuses. Pt. Gangadhar has him killed. Veer's wife then dies of shock, leaving behind their son, Suraj, to be brought up by a kindly widow called Mrs. Salma Khan.

Many years later, following a successful military career, Suraj returns to his home village to avenge his parents' death.Suraj later avenges his father's death.

== Cast ==
- Raaj Kumar as Collector Rajpal Chauhan
- Vinod Khanna as Suraj Singh "Suryaa"
- Bhanupriya as Shanno
- Raj Babbar as Inspector Iqbal Khan
- Shakti Kapoor as Ratan Chaudhary
- Amrish Puri as Gangadhar Chaudhary
- Sushma Seth as Salma Khan
- Aloknath as Veer Singh
- Sudhir Dalvi as Army Senior Officer Mohan
- Johnny Lever as Jani
- Salim Ghouse as Ramu Gulzar
- Dulari as Ramu's Mother
- Dinesh Hingoo as Bank Manager
- Rajesh Puri as Gangadhar's Munim
- Smita Talwalkar as Gangadhar Chaudhary's Wife (Guest Role)

== Music ==
The music was composed by Laxmikant–Pyarelal, with the lyrics being penned by Santosh Anand.

Song	Singer
"Aayega Suryaa"	Mohammed Aziz
"Aa Bhagwan Ke Ghar Aa"	Mohammed Aziz
"Maine Tujhse Pyar Kiya Hai, Is Mein Meri Khata Nahin"	Mohammed Aziz, Anuradha Paudwal
"Pyar Kahe Banaya"	Alka Yagnik
"Allam Gallam Sajna, Main Kuch Kar Jaungi"	Kavita Krishnamurthy, Uttara Kelkar
