= Aadamkhor =

1986 film by Joginder Shelly

- Directed by: Joginder
- Starring: C S Aasie, Sunil Dhawan, Ranjeet
- Release date: 1986
- Country: India
- Language: Hindi

Aadamkhor is a 1986 Bollywood Hindi language horror movie directed by Joginder Shelly. The film stars Joginder Shelly, Neelam Mehra, Nazneen, Sona Mastan Mirza, Jagdarshan, Randhawa and Reetu Khanna.

== Plot ==
The leading protagonists are the daughters of four army officers who practise different faiths: Hindu, Muslim, Christian and Sikh. They are trained in martial arts with the intent to promote secularism within the country.

== Cast ==
- Neelam Mehra as Neelam Kaur
- Iqbal Durrani
- Pinchoo Kapoor
- Nazneen
- Sona Mastan Mirza
- Joginder Shelly
- Sunil Dhawan
- Ranjeet
- Sadhana Khote
- Ved Goswami
- Jogdarshan
- Jaggu
- Uma Khosla
- Kundan

== Soundtrack ==
1. "Badla Har Ek Taur Hai" – Mahendra Kapoor
2. "De Khna Tab Mazaa Aayega" – Deepa Dey
3. "Paida Kiya Hai Bharat Ma Ne" – Mahendra Kapoor
4. "Tere Samne Hai Ladki Jawan" – Deepa Dey, Dilraj Kaur, Meenu Purushottam
5. "Tune Jo Chua Hoton Se" – Deepa Dey
