= Khoon Ki Pukaar =

- Directed by: Ramesh Ahuja
- Starring: Vinod Khanna; Shabana Azmi; Aruna Irani
- Music by: Bappi Lahiri
- Release date: 1978
- Country: India
- Language: Hindi

Khoon Ki Pukaar is a 1978 Bollywood action film drama directed by Ramesh Ahuja. The film stars Vinod Khanna and Shabana Azmi in lead roles.

== Plot ==
After the murder of his wife, and his son's kidnapping, Dr. Vidya Bhushan decides to devote the rest of his life as a Poojary, living on the premises of a princely-donated temple, hoping and praying that one day he will be reunited with his estranged son. One day a wounded bandit named Sher Singh comes to him for protection, and he not only shields the man from the police, but also tends to his wounds, and lies to the townspeople that the man's name is Amrit, When Amrit recovers, he is grateful to Vidya for looking after him, and he falls in love with a town belle by the name of Shano. What Vidya does not know that is that Amrit is really interested in the gold and jewellery hidden in a secret underground chamber below the temple; and what Amrit does not know is Shalu is seeking vengeance against Sher Singh for killing her father.

== Cast ==
- Vinod Khanna as Amrit / Sher Singh
- Shabana Azmi as Shanno
- Aruna Irani as Bijli
- Pran as Dr. Vidya Bhushan / Poojari
- Amjad Khan as Zalim Singh / Sardar
- Iftekhar as Khan
- Roopesh Kumar as Bheema
- Rita Bhaduri as Rani

== Soundtrack ==
Song	Singer
"Aankhon Mein To Hai"	Kishore Kumar
"O Jaan-E-Jana, Pyar Ko Na Jana"	Kishore Kumar, Lata Mangeshkar
"Mathe Pe Sone Ki Bindiya"	Lata Mangeshkar
"Aaj Mera Bhi Armaan"	Lata Mangeshkar
"Itna Pyar Diya Hai"	Lata Mangeshkar
"Jai Ambe Maa Bolo, Jai Durge Maa Bolo"	Lata Mangeshkar, Mohammed Rafi
"Mere Munne, Mera Jeevan"	Anuradha Paudwal
