= Mera Gaon Mera Desh =

- Poster
- Directed by: Raj Khosla
- Written by: Akhtar Romani
- Screenplay by: G. R. Kamat
- Story by: Khosla Enterprises Story Department
- Produced by: Raj Khosla; Lekhraj Khosla; Bolu Khosla
- Starring: Dharmendra; Asha Parekh; Vinod Khanna
- Cinematography: Pratap Sinha
- Edited by: Waman Bhonsle
- Music by: Laxmikant–Pyarelal; Anand Bakshi (lyrics)
- Production company: Khosla Enterprises
- Distributed by: Khosla Enterprises
- Release date: 1971
- Country: India
- Language: Hindi

Mera Gaon Mera Desh (transl. My village, my country) is a 1971 Indian Hindi-language dacoit Western film directed by Raj Khosla, from a story by Akhtar Romani. It stars Dharmendra and Asha Parekh in lead roles with Vinod Khanna as the villain. It was a blockbuster at the box office cementing superstar status of both Dharmendra and Vinod Khanna.

== Plot ==
Havaldar Major Jaswant Singh makes a citizen's arrest of petty thief Ajit and hands him over to the police, and after due process of law he is sentenced to six months in jail. After completing his sentence, the jailer asks him to approach Jaswant Singh for employment, and so he does. Jaswant asks him to help him with his farming work. Ajit meets Anju and both fall in love. Ajit hears of Jabbar Singh a dacoit who is terrorizing the surrounding community, and Ajit decides to take on Jabbar. In retaliation, Jabbar abducts Anju, and instructs Ajit to come unarmed. Ajit decides to follow these instructions, however, as soon as he reaches Jabbar's hideout, he too is captured, and at the mercy of Jabbar and Munni, who has been scorned by Ajit, and it is now up to her to decide Ajit's fate.

== Cast ==
Name of actor	Role portrayed
Dharmendra	Ajit
Asha Parekh	Anju
Vinod Khanna	Jabbar Singh / Thakur
Laxmi Chhaya	Munnibai
Jayant	Hawaldaar-Major Jaswant Singh
Purnima	Mausi - Village Mad Lady
Asit Sen	Motumal (Drunk)
Sudhir	Police Inspector
Bhagwan Dada	Chotumal (Drunk)
Uma Dutt	Judge
Mohan Choti	Uncredited
Birbal	Nai
Manmohan	Uncredited
Dulari	Mrs. Ramdin Patel (Anju's mother)

== Soundtrack ==
#	Title	Singer(s)
1	"Aaya Aaya Atariya Pe Koi Chor"	Lata Mangeshkar
2	"Apni Prem Kahaniyaan"	Lata Mangeshkar
3	"Kuchh Kehta Hai Ye Saawan"	Lata Mangeshkar, Mohammed Rafi
4	"Sona Lai Ja Re"	Lata Mangeshkar
5	"Maar Diya Jaye"	Lata Mangeshkar

== Awards and nominations ==
Dharmendra received a Filmfare nomination for Best Actor, the only one for the film.
