= Do Yaar =

- Directed by: Kewal Mishra
- Starring: Vinod Khanna; Rekha; Shatrughan Sinha; Nazima
- Music by: Sonik Omi
- Release date: 1 December 1972
- Country: India
- Language: Hindi

Do Yaar (transl. Two Friends) is a 1972 Indian Hindi-language action film directed by Kewal Mishra. The film stars Vinod Khanna, Rekha, Shatrughan Sinha, and Nazima in lead roles. It was later remade in Telugu as Iddaru Iddare (1976) and Tamil as Kuppathu Raja (1979).

== Plot synopsis ==
Rajesh is on a mission to seek revenge on Jagira, who ruined his sister's life. However, when the two men meet, they become friends, unaware of each other's real identities.

== Cast ==
- Vinod Khanna as Rajesh / Raju
- Rekha as Seema
- Shatrughan Sinha as Jagira / Jugal
- Nazima as Shanno / Moti Bai

== Music ==
Song	Singer
"Zamane Ab To Khush Ho"	Asha Bhosle
"Mere Ghungroo Deewane"	Asha Bhosle
"Kajre Ki Dhaar Hai Kataar"	Asha Bhosle
"Loot Gaye Lakhon Jab Lage Kamar Ka Thumka, Goriyan Tadpe Jab Marun Nazar Ka Tunka"	Asha Bhosle, Mohammed Rafi, Manna Dey
