= Prem Kahani (1975 film) =

- Promotional poster
- Directed by: Raj Khosla
- Written by: Raj Khosla
- Produced by: Lekhraj Khosla; Bolu Khosla (Associate Producer)
- Starring: Shashi Kapoor; Rajesh Khanna; Mumtaz
- Cinematography: Kaka Thakur
- Edited by: Waman Bhonsle
- Music by: Laxmikant-Pyarelal
- Production company: Khosla Enterprises
- Release date: 7 March 1975
- Running time: 150 minutes
- Country: India
- Language: Hindi

Prem Kahani (lit. 'Love story') is a 1975 Indian Hindi-language film produced by Lekhraj Khosla, and written and directed by Raj Khosla. It stars Shashi Kapoor, Rajesh Khanna and Mumtaz in lead roles along with Trilok Kapoor, K. N. Singh in supporting roles and Vinod Khanna in guest appearance. The film's music was composed by Laxmikant-Pyarelal. The film was one of the highest-grossing Indian films of 1975.

== Cast ==
- Shashi Kapoor as SP Dheeraj Kumar
- Rajesh Khanna as Rajesh Kamleshwar Narayan
- Mumtaz as Kamini Sinha
- Vinod Khanna (Guest appearance) as Sher Khan
- Trilok Kapoor as Brijesh Narayan
- K. N. Singh as Rai Bahadur Shrikant Sinha
- Yunus Parvez as Kotwal
- Leela Mishra as Dheeraj's Aunty

== Plot ==
Rajesh Kamleshwar Narayan (Rajesh Khanna) is presented as an apolitical poet. He lives with his elder brother Brijesh Narayan (Trilok Kapoor) who is a freedom fighter, his sister-in-law and his niece Munni. His best friend is Dheeraj Kumar (Shashi Kapoor) who is an SP working in Ghazipur and the son of a judge.

Rajesh finishes his M.A. and returns home to his sweetheart Kamini Sinha (Mumtaz). Kamini's father Rai Bahadur Shrikant Sinha (K. N. Singh) works for British government and dislikes Rajesh and his family as they work for Gandhi. Rajesh and Kamini are reluctant to talk about their marriage as Rajesh has no job.

Brijesh takes part in a demonstration and is shot dead by British officials. Rajesh is shattered by this loss and joins the freedom struggle as a revolutionary. Realising the risks involved he wants Kamini to not have to undergo the cruelties of widowhood. He pretends to have no intention to marry her and that he had used her as a subject for practising his poems.

He takes part in murders of British officials. The British government wants him alive or dead. His beloved child Munni dies when her mother stuffs her mouth fearing British officials. This is another heartbreak for Rajesh.

He is wounded by the British and seeks refuge with newly wedded Dheeraj with the help of a pathan truck driver Sher Khan (Vinod Khanna). Dheeraj's bride is revealed to be Kamini. Rajesh tries to leave, but Dheeraj stops him. Kamini is hostile to Rajesh. On Dheeraj's insistence they both recite a poem in which Rajesh expresses his sorrow for breaking her heart.

A constable who wants to become an inspector tortures Sher Khan so that he reveals Rajesh's whereabouts. Dheeraj lies to Rajesh that Sher Khan is safe. Sher Khan then kills himself after saying that Rajesh lives in his heart. Constable doubts that Rajesh stays in Dheeraj's house so he writes in a police file that Rajesh and Kamini love each other. Dheeraj sees the file and doesn't know what to believe.

Dheeraj gets drunk, meets Rajesh and Kamini and asks them about their feelings. Dheeraj is heartbroken, but saves Rajesh from the police. He accuses Rajesh of romancing his wife. Rajesh points his gun at Dheeraj and says that he wants to kill Dheeraj and marry Kamini, who then shoots Rajesh. Rajesh falls and shows his unloaded pistol. He asks Dheeraj to embrace him. He wishes that Kamini and Dheeraj should live long with happiness and then he dies.

== Soundtrack ==
Song	Singer
"Chal Dariya Mein"	Kishore Kumar, Lata Mangeshkar
"Prem Kahani Mein"	Kishore Kumar, Lata Mangeshkar
"Phool Ahista Phenko"	Lata Mangeshkar, Mukesh
"Doston Mein Koi"	Mohammed Rafi
"Nadiya Se Bichhda"	Lata Mangeshkar
"Prem Hai Kya"	Mohammed Rafi
"Yun To Humne"	Rajesh Khanna

== Reception ==
It received four stars in the Bollywood guide Collections.
