= Bindu (actress) =

Indian actress (born 1941)

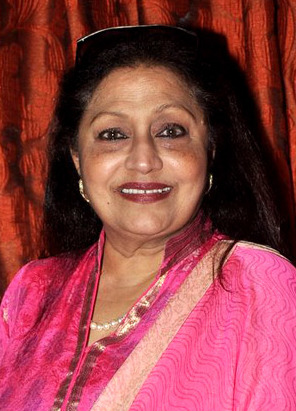
- Bindu
- Born: Bindu Nanubhai Desai; 17 April 1941 (age 85); Valsad, Bombay Presidency, British India (Present-day Valsad, Gujarat, India)
- Occupations: Actress, Dancer
- Years active: 1959–2008
- Spouse: Champaklal Zaveri
- Children: 1 (deceased)
- Relatives: Roy–Joshi–Irani-Desai family

Bindu Nanubhai Desai (born 17 April 1941), better known mononymously as Bindu, is a former Indian actress who was popular in the 1970s. She has acted in over 160 movies in a career that spanned four decades, receiving seven Filmfare Award nominations. She is most remembered for her role as Shabnam in Kati Patang (1970) and for her films opposite Prem Chopra.

Bindu made her film debut in 1962 at age 21, starring in her first film Anpadh as Kiran. In 1969, she starred in Ittefaq as Renu, and in Do Raaste as Neela. Both films were box-office hits, and Bindu received two nominations for the Filmfare Award for Best Supporting Actress for her performance in both the films. In 1972, she starred in Dastaan as Mala, and received her third nomination for a Filmfare award for the film. In 1973, Bindu was then cast in Abhimaan as Chitra. The film was yet another box-office hit, attributing to Bindu's credibility at the time. Her performance in the movie led her to receive her fourth nomination for a Filmfare award. Then, in 1974, she starred in films Hawas as Kamini, and in Imtihan as Rita. Both films were commercially successful, and Bindu received two more Filmfare nominations. In 1976, she then starred in Arjun Pandit as Sarla, and received her last nomination for a Filmfare Award.

== Early life ==
Bindu was born to film producer Nanubhai Desai and Jyotsna in Hanuman Bhagda, a small village in the Valsad district in Gujarat and was raised alongside her seven siblings. Bindu's father died in 1954 when she was 13 and being the eldest daughter, the burden of earning money fell on her shoulders.

Aruna Irani, Indra Kumar, Adi Irani and Firoz Irani are her first cousins.

== Career ==
Bindu Desai had early successes with Do Raaste and Ittefaq in 1969, receiving her first and second nominations for the Filmfare Award for Best Supporting Actress. Then she went on to write her success story with Shakti Samanta's Kati Patang (1970), where she had a sizzling cabaret dance, "Mera Naam Shabnam" to her credit; a number which is even today remembered as one of the highlights of the film.

Bindu's mesmerising performances in 1974 as a seductress in Imtihan, and as a nymphomaniac in Hawas, left critics and audiences asking for more, earning two nominations for the Filmfare Award for Best Supporting Actress. With a string of hits behind her, she successfully managed to break out of the myth that married actresses usually do not go to become sex symbols, especially in the Hindi film industry. She is the third point in the 'holy trinity' of item number queens. Along with Helen and Aruna Irani, Bindu defined the Bollywood 'cabaret' dance number and the role of the 'Vamp'.

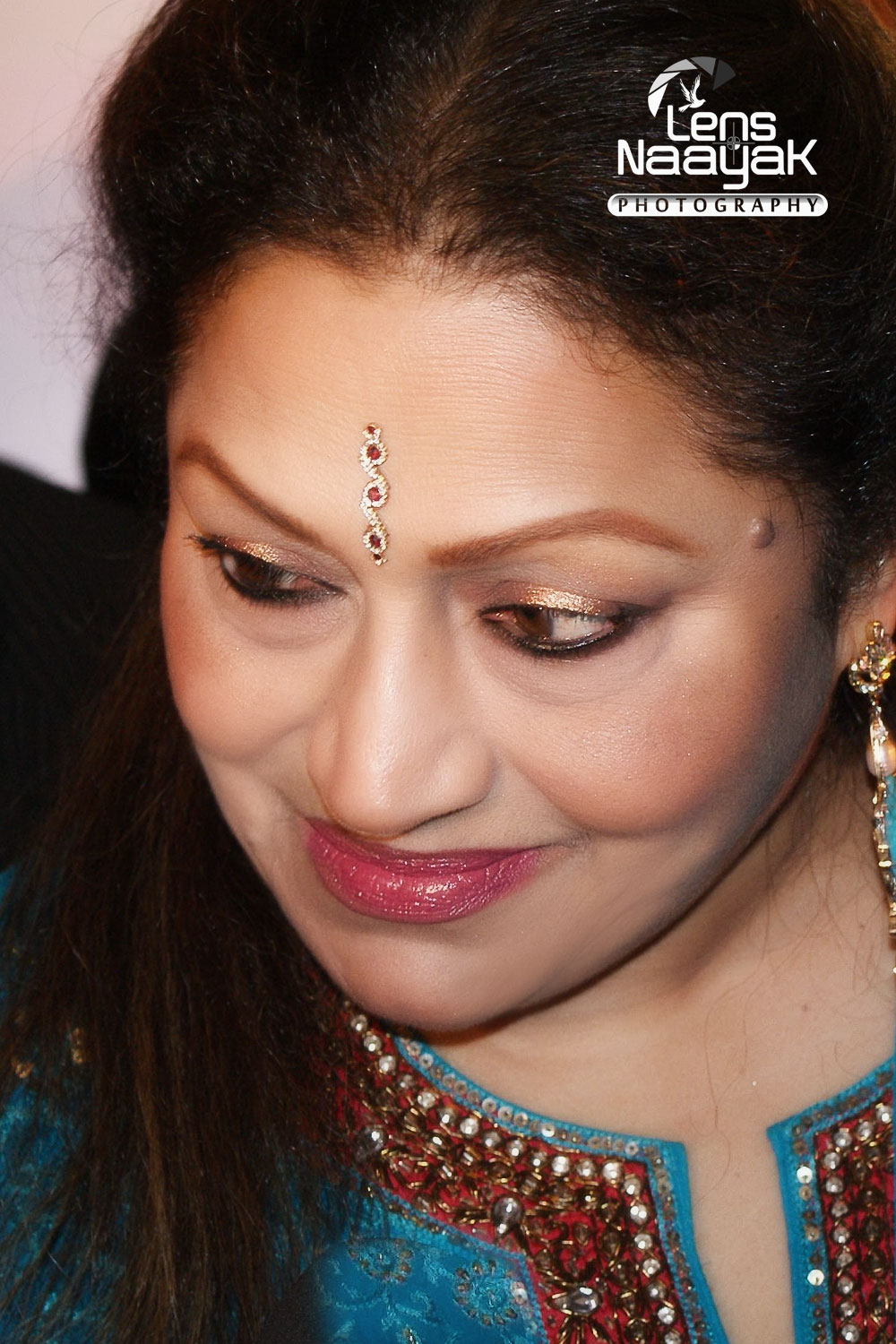
Bindu in 2010

Her acting ability was seen in films like Hrishikesh Mukherjee's films, as the deglamorised role of wife to Ashok Kumar in Arjun Pandit and in Abhimaan, where she won raves for playing a very sympathetic character. She received two more nominations for the Filmfare Award for Best Supporting Actress. She proved to be just as convincing as the crippled woman in Chaitali. She played Mona Darling, the villain's moll in Zanjeer, thus becoming one of her most iconic roles.

She was paired opposite Prem Chopra regularly in films such as Lagan, Kati Patang, Do Raaste, Chhupa Rustam, Prem Nagar, Phandebaaz, Tyaag, Nafrat, Gehri Chaal and Dastaan where she played an adultress, receiving her seventh nomination for the Filmfare Award for Best Supporting Actress. She even danced with Sivaji Ganesan in the Tamil film Naladhu Oru Kudumbam in 1979.She did 13 films with Rajesh Khanna from 1969 film Do Raaste to 1986 film Adhikar.

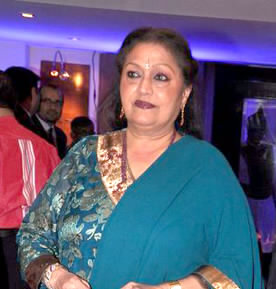
Bindu in 2012

An impending pregnancy, followed by a miscarriage, brought about a lull in her career and on the advice of her doctors she had to end her stint as the glamorous 'vamp' – dancing and all in 1983. However, she did not stay away for long and returned to the silver screen with character roles – Hero, Alag Alag, Biwi Ho To Aisi and Kishen Kanhaiya and with many other such movies she managed to re-establish herself as the unmerciful and cruel mother-in-law, or the cynical aunt.

In the later stages of her career, she made fewer on-screen appearances, like the ones in Shola Aur Shabnam, Aankhen which highlighted her comic side, and followed with other light and funny performances in Hum Aapke Hain Koun..!, Main Hoon Na, and Om Shanti Om.

== Awards and nominations ==
Year	Award	Film	Category	Result
1970	Filmfare Awards	Ittefaq	Best Supporting Actress	Nominated
1971	Filmfare Awards	Do Raaste	Best Supporting Actress	Nominated
1973	Filmfare Awards	Dastaan	Best Supporting Actress	Nominated
1974	Filmfare Awards	Abhimaan	Best Supporting Actress	Nominated
1975	Filmfare Awards	Hawas	Best Supporting Actress	Nominated
1975	Filmfare Awards	Imtihan	Best Supporting Actress	Nominated
1977	Filmfare Awards	Arjun Pandit	Best Supporting Actress	Nominated

== Selected filmography ==
- Anpadh (1962) as Kiran
- Aya Sawan Jhoom Ke (1969)
- Nateeja (1969)
- Ittefaq (1969) as Renu
- Do Raaste (1969) as Neela
- Kati Patang (1970) as Shabnam
- Preet Ki Dori (1971)
- Amar Prem (1971)
- Dushman (1971) as Special Appearance
- Haseenon Ka Devata (1971)
- Dastaan (1972) as Mala Sahay
- Dil Ka Raaja (1972)
- Ek Bechara (1972)
- Garam Masala (1972) as Neelima
- Raja Jani (1972) as Special Appearance
- Mere Jeevan Saathi (1972)
- Dharma (1973)
- Zanjeer (1973) as Mona
- Gaai Aur Gori (1973) as Mohini
- Gehri Chaal (1973) as Shobha
- Joshila (1973)
- Anhonee (1973)
- Abhimaan (1973)
- Suraj Aur Chanda (1973)
- Hawas (1974) as Kamini
- Free Love (1974)
- Imtihan (1974) as Rita
- Pagli (1974)
- Prem Nagar (1974)
- Bangaarada Panjara (1974 Kannada film) as Reshma
- Chaitali (1975)
- Dafaa 302 (1975)
- Jaggu (1975)
- Sewak (1975)
- Dhoti Lota Aur Chowpatty (1975) as Dancer
- Aaj Ka Mahaatma (1976)
- Arjun Pandit (1976)
- Shankar Shambhu (1976) as Munni Bai
- Shankar Dada (1976) as Bindiya
- Shaque (1976) as Rosita
- Dus Numbri (1976)
- Nehle Peh Dehlaa (1976) Filomina
- Thief of Baghdad (1977)
- Do Chehere (1977) as Dancer
- Hira Aur Patthar (1977)
- Chakkar Pe Chakkar (1977)
- Chala Murari Hero Banne (1977)
- Chalta Purza (1977)
- Maha Badmaash (1977)
- Bandie (1978) as Bimala
- Chor Ho To Aisa (1978)
- Des Pardes (1978) as Sylvia
- Ganga Ki Saugandh (1978)
- Besharam (1978) as Manju
- Jalan (1978)
- Trishna (1978)
- Phandebaaz (1978)
- Rahu Ketu (1978)
- Ram Kasam (1978)
- Amar Deep (1979) as Asha
- Nallathoru Kudumbam (1979 Tamil film) as the Dancer in One and two cha cha song
- Inspector Eagle (1979)
- Allaudinaum Arputha Vilakkum (1979 Tamil–Malayalam bilingual) as the Dancer in a song
- Khandaan (1979) as Nanda V. Shrivastav
- Sarkari Mehmaan (1979)
- Agreement (1980)
- Jwalamukhi (1980)
- Lahu Pukarega (1980)
- Shaan (1980) as Special Appearance
- Naseeb (1981) as Special Appearance
- Laawaris (1981)
- Prem Rog (1982)
- Hero (1983) as Jamna
- Divorce (1984)
- Paisa Yeh Paisa (1985)
- Aaj Ka Daur (1985)
- Karma (1986)
- Hifazat (1987)
- Biwi Ho To Aisi (1988)
- Kishen Kanhaiya (1990) as Kamini
- Ghar Ho To Aisa (1990)
- Yeh Aag Kab Bujhegi (1991)
- Honeymoon (1992)
- Shola Aur Shabnam (1992)
- Aankhen (1993)
- Aasoo Bane Angaarey (1993)
- Roop Ki Rani Choron Ka Raja (1993)
- Chhoti Bahoo (1994)
- Krantiveer (1994) as Special Appearance
- Hum Aapke Hain Koun..! (1994) as Bhagwanti Kashyap
- Anokha Andaaz (1995) as Shashi Mehta
- Shohrat (1996) as Sudha Saigal
- Judwaa (1997) as Sundari Motwani
- Banarasi Babu (1997)
- Ehsaas is Tarah (1998)
- Aunty No. 1 (1998)
- Jaanam Samjha Karo (1999)
- Pyaar Koi Khel Nahin (1999)
- Sooryavansham (1999)
- Mere Yaar Ki Shaadi Hai (2002)
- Main Hoon Na (2004)
- Om Shanti Om (2007)
- Mehbooba (2008)
