= Achanak (1973 film) =

1973 Hindi film directed by Gulzar

- Achanak film poster
- Directed by: Gulzar
- Written by: Khwaja Ahmad Abbas; Gulzar
- Produced by: Raj N. Sippy; Romu N. Sippy
- Starring: Vinod Khanna; Lily Chakravarty; Asrani
- Cinematography: K Vaikunth
- Edited by: Waman B. Bhosle; Gurudutt Shirali
- Music by: Vasant Desai
- Release date: 1973
- Country: India
- Language: Hindi

Achanak (transl. Suddenly) is a 1973 Indian Hindi-language film, directed by Gulzar, written by Khwaja Ahmad Abbas, and starring Vinod Khanna. Gulzar received a Filmfare nomination as Best Director for this film. Even though Gulzar is an accomplished lyricist, this film did not have any songs in it. K. A. Abbas earned a Filmfare nomination for best story. It is inspired by the real-life sensational 1958 murder case K. M. Nanavati v State of Maharashtra.

The actual messages conveyed by the movie are more sublime than simple cuckoldry. First and foremost is the futility of a doctor's efforts to save life of an already condemned person. After months of untiring efforts of doctors, nurses and all paramedics, the condemned man finally meets his fate at the gallows. Ethics of human killing is another message. While on one hand the protagonist is awarded a Vir Chakra for killing several humans during war, on the other he is sentenced to death for killing two humans close to him.

The 1963 movie Yeh Rastey Hain Pyar Ke is also based on the same case. The Akshay Kumar-starrer 2016 movie Rustom is based on the same case as well.

The film had no songs, and the background score is composed by Vasant Desai.

== Plot ==
Major Ranjit Khanna and his wife Pushpa are in love with each other. His commanding officer, Lt. Col. Bakshi, is his father-in-law. Ranjit is happy in his married life, until he finds out about his wife's affair with his best friend. He kills both of them and surrenders to the police. Then, he escapes from the police to go to the river Ganga, as he wants to fulfill his wife's desire to leave her Mangalsutra in the river. However, in his escape attempt, the police shoot him, and he is injured. He is then admitted to the hospital, where he becomes emotionally attached to the doctors and nurses. When he is finally sentenced to death, they are moved to tears.

== Cast ==
Character	Actor
Major Ranjeet Khanna	Vinod Khanna
Dr Chaudhary	Om Shivpuri
Mrs Pushpa Khanna	Lily Chakravarty
Nurse Radha	Farida Jalal
Dr Kailash	Asrani
Colonel Bakshi	Iftekhar
Mr Gupta, Supdt of Police	Kamal Deep

== Production ==
The entire film production was completed in 28 days. Achanak was based on a Khwaja Ahmed Abbas story, The Thirteenth Victim, which had appeared in the magazine called Imprint. In 1973 N.C Sippy's sons, Romu Sippy and Raj Sippy collaborated with partner Hrishikesh Mukherjee to produce Achanak and they approached Gulzar to direct it. Gulzar approached Vasantrao, a marathi background score composer to compose the score for this film since it would have no songs otherwise.

== Soundtrack ==
Background music was composed by Vasant Desai.

#	Song title	Singer
1	"Sun Mere Bandhu Re"	S D Burman
