= Maha Badmaash =

- Promotional Poster
- Directed by: R.G. Thaker
- Written by: Faiz Saleem
- Produced by: Swarn Singh
- Starring: Vinod Khanna; Neetu Singh
- Music by: Ravindra Jain
- Release date: 30 September 1977
- Country: India
- Language: Hindi

Maha Badmaash [A Great Crook] is a 1977 Bollywood film, directed by R.G. Thaker.

== Plot ==
Ratan runs a legitimate casino, unaware that he is under surveillance by an international gangster named Mogambha, who remains unseen, but is only ever heard. When Ratan is approached and asked to partner with Mogambha, he refuses, and is implicated in the murder of a man named Mombha. Thus entrapped, he agrees to be part of Mogambha's gang and is asked to work together with Pinky Nathani and Mike. Subsequently, Ratan is asked to kill Ajit Saxena, the Commissioner of Police, which he refuses to do. Mogambha's men then abduct his Secretary, Reddy, and his sister, Mala, and hold them for ransom until the time Ratan assassinates Ajit. Will Ratan commit this felony, or refuse —risking the lives of Reddy and Mala, and possibly losing everything he holds dear?

== Cast ==
- Vinod Khanna as Ratan
- Neetu Singh as Seema / Pinky (Double Role)
- Bindu as Reena
- Brahmachari as Reddy
- Imtiaz Khan as Mike
- Pinchoo Kapoor as Dindayal
- Randhir as Mr. Nathani
- Praveen Paul as Mrs. Nathani
- Om Shivpuri as Parker
- Raza Murad as Voice of Mogambo
- M.B. Shetty as Alberto
- Rajan Haskar as Mombha
- Alka as Mala
- Nisari Ahmed as Commissioner Ajit Saxena
- Shiv Kumar as Minister
- Bhushan Tiwari as Goon
- Nandita Thakur as Mogambo Assistant
- Kedarnath Saigal as Police Inspector
- Harbans Darshan as Mental Hospital Doctor

== Music ==
Song	Singer	Lyricist
"Yun Husn Ka Jalwa"	Asha Bhosle	Noor Dewasi
"Abhi Zara Si Der Mein"	Asha Bhosle	Naqsh Lyallpuri
"Nazar Hai Badli Badli Si, Ada Hai Jaani Pehchani"	Asha Bhosle, Mohammed Rafi	Kulwant Jani
