= Nehle Pe Dehla =

Nehle Peh Dehlaa
- Film Poster
- Directed by: Raj Khosla
- Produced by: Sunil Dutt
- Starring: Sunil Dutt; Saira Banu; Vinod Khanna; Bindu; Ranjeet; Premnath; Trilok Kapoor; Om Prakash
- Music by: R. D. Burman
- Release date: 1976
- Running time: 120 minutes
- Country: India
- Language: Hindi

Nehle Peh Dehlaa is a 1976 Indian Hindi-language film directed by Raj Khosla and produced by Sunil Dutt who started in the film. The music is by R. D. Burman.

== Plot ==
Two brothers, Ram (Sunil Dutt) and Rahim (Vinod Khanna), are separated at a young age by a smuggler (Prem Nath) who kills their father, who is a police officer. Both of them grow up to become thieves. They become partners, yet remain unaware of their brotherhood. The movie ends with them discovering their past and taking revenge on the smuggler.

== Cast ==
- Sunil Dutt as Sunil / Ram
- Saira Banu as Beena
- Vinod Khanna as Rahim
- Bindu as Filomina
- Premnath as General
- Ranjeet as Alberto
- Trilok Kapoor as Police Commissioner
- Dev Kumar as Tiger
- Anwar Hussain as Doctor
- Ramayan Tiwari as Karim
- Om Prakash as Mangal
- Bharat Bhushan as Police Inspector
- Kamini Kaushal as Sunil's Mother

== Soundtrack ==
Nehle Pe Dehla

Soundtrack album by R. D. Burman
- Released: 1976
- Recorded: 1976
- Genre: Soundtrack
- Length: 25:43
- Label: Saregama
- Producer: R. D. Burman

R. D. Burman chronology
Dharam Karam (1975)	Nehle Pe Dehla (1976)	Maha Chor (1976)

The music was composed by R. D. Burman and released on Saregama.

Track-List
No.	Title	Lyrics	Singer(s)	Length
1.	"Sawan Ka Mahina Aa Gaya"	Anand Bakshi	Kishore Kumar, Lata Mangeshkar	5:11
2.	"Logon Ki Zuban Pe Apna Naam"	Anand Bakshi	Kishore Kumar, Lata Mangeshkar, Manna Dey	4:33
3.	"Main Choron Ki Rani Hoon"	Anand Bakshi	Asha Bhosle	3:46
4.	"Mashook Apne Shabab Mein"	Anand Bakshi	Lata Mangeshkar	4:49
5.	"Sunle Tu Binati Meri Haji Ali"	Faruk Kaiser	Aziz Nazan Qawwal	7:24
Total length:				25:43
