= Hatyara (1977 film) =

- Poster
- Directed by: Surendra Mohan
- Produced by: Sunil Sharma
- Starring: Moushumi Chatterjee; Vinod Khanna; Rakesh Roshan
- Music by: Kalyanji Anandji
- Release date: 1977
- Country: India
- Language: Hindi

Hatyara (lit. 'Murderer') is a 1977 Hindi action crime film. Produced by Sunil Sharma and directed by Surendra Mohan, the film stars Vinod Khanna, Moushumi Chatterjee, Pradeep Kumar, Rakesh Roshan and Nirupa Roy. The film's music is by Kalyanji Anandji.

== Plot ==
Daulat Singh and Bhairav Singh are bandits in India and live a violent lifestyle. Daulat is married to Shanta and has two children, Vijay and Geeta. One Diwali he accidentally kills a man, leaving behind a son and his mother almost destitute. Moved by their plight, he surrenders to the police, is arrested, tried and sentenced to life in prison. Whatever money he earns in prison, he sends it to the widow and her son. Due to his good conduct, he is discharged after several years and returns home to his now grown-up Forest Officer son, and matured daughter. The village welcomes him back and also honors him. He meets with the local Thakur and arranges Vijay's marriage with his daughter, Gauri, who love each other. Inspector Prakash, Vijay's friend, has fallen in love with Geeta and Daulat is more than happy to get them married also. Geeta's marriage is arranged, but on the day of the wedding, Prakash's mother recognizes Daulat as the man who killed her husband, and decides to cancel the wedding. An enraged Thakur also breaks off Gauri's marriage with Vijay, and decides to get her married to Bankelal. When Gauri objects to this marriage, Banke has Vijay abducted and forces Gauri to marry him, but Vijay manages to escape, kills Banke and joins forces with Bhairav Singh and other bandits. He exacts vengeance on Pyarelal by killing him thus pitting himself against his very own father, who disowns him, as well as Prakash who decides to entrap him on Raksha bandhan albeit in vain. Prakash's mother has a change of heart when she finds out that Daulat has been providing for her financially all these years, and agrees to accept Geeta as her daughter-in-law. But before the marriage could take place, she angrily approaches Daulat and tells him that the wedding is canceled again - this time because Vijay has abducted Prakash. Watch what impact this has on Daulat, Geeta, Shanta, and the rest of the village.

== Cast ==
- Vinod Khanna as Vijay/Inspector Ajay Singh
- Moushumi Chatterjee as Gauri
- Rajesh Khanna (Special Appearance)
- Rakesh Roshan as Inspector Prakash
- Pran as Daulat Singh
- Nirupa Roy as Prakash's mother
- Mehmood
- Pradeep Kumar as Bhairav Singh
- Manmohan as Banke
- Raj Mehra as Thakur
- Kanhaiyalal Chaturvedi as Pyare
- Chand Usmani as Shanta D. Singh
- Abhi Bhattacharya as Jailor
- Laxmi Chhaya as Champakali
- Dev Kumar as Zaalim Singh

== Music ==
1. "Sone Ka Chabutara, Uspe Naache Mor" – Kishore Kumar, Lata Mangeshkar
2. "Hamara Kaam Hai, Hum Toh Sare Bajaar Naachnge" – Mehmood, Johnny Junior, Shahid Bijnori
3. "Zindagi Naam Hai, Waqt Ki Maar Ka" – Mohammed Rafi
4. "Mere Noor Ke Charche Dur Dur" – Asha Bhosle
5. "Rakhi Le Lo" – Amit Kumar
