= Imtihan =

- Directed by: Madan Sinha
- Story by: K. Balachandar
- Based on: Nootrukku Nooru (Tamil)
- Produced by: B.A. Chandiramani
- Starring: Vinod Khanna; Tanuja; Bindu
- Music by: Laxmikant–Pyarelal
- Release date: 31 May 1974 (India)
- Country: India
- Language: Hindi

Imtihan (transl. Test) is a 1974 Indian Hindi-language film starring Vinod Khanna, Tanuja and Bindu. The story of the film revolves around an idealistic professor who decides to reform a group of rowdy students at a college. It is inspired by the 1967 British film To Sir, with Love, and has inspired the television series Jeet. The film was shot in Nashik. It is remake of Tamil film Nootrukku Nooru.

== Plot ==
Pramod Sharma is the son of a wealthy businessman. An idealistic person, he leaves his family business to become a lecturer of history at the college Adarsh Mahavidyalya. The students of the college are highly indisciplined, and the crowd includes Rakesh, a rowdy student involved in several unlawful activities. Pramod tries to reform these students. Rita, the college chairman's daughter and a student, develops an infatuation for Pramod.

Meanwhile, Pramod meets Madhu, the daughter of the college principal H. P. Shastri. He learns that she was in love with Vijay, a pilot, and both were expected to marry soon. Unfortunately, Vijay's plane crashed and he died. The shock of this news lead to Madhu falling off the stairs, resulting in a permanent damage to her leg. Madhu falls in love with Pramod, who brings positivity to her life. He encourages her to follow up on her hobbies, especially painting, and go out more often. Rita, who is jealous of Pramod's relationship with Madhu, falsely accuses him of sexual harassment, supported by Rakesh. The rest of the story tells of how Pramod gets through this imtihan ("test") of life. In the end, Pramod proves his innocence and takes leave from the college, joined by Madhu.

== Cast ==
- Vinod Khanna as Pramod Kumar Sharma
- Tanuja as Madhu Shastri
- Bindu as Rita
- Ranjeet as Paul
- Abhi Bhattacharya as H. P. Shastri
- Murad as Mr. Sharma

== Soundtrack ==
The lyrics for the film songs were written by Majrooh Sultanpuri, and the music was composed by Laxmikant–Pyarelal.

Song	Singer
"Ruk Jana Nahin"	Kishore Kumar
"Roz Sham Aati Thi"	Lata Mangeshkar
"Dekho Idhar Bhi, Jaan-E-Tamanna"	Usha Mangeshkar, Asha Bhosle
"Bujha De, Jal Gayi"	Asha Bhosle
"Ruk Jana Nahin (Part 2)"	Kishore Kumar

The title of the Indian television series Ruk Jaana Nahin is based on the song from the film.

== Awards and nominations ==
- Bindu - Nominated for Filmfare Award for Best Supporting Actress (1974)
