= Insaan (1982 film) =

- Theatrical release poster
- Directed by: Narendra Bedi
- Written by: Rajindra Singh Bedi (dialogues)
- Screenplay by: Narendra Bedi
- Story by: Veena Bedi
- Produced by: Ved Khanna
- Starring: Vinod Khanna; Jeetendra; Reena Roy
- Cinematography: Kaka Thakur
- Edited by: Waman Bhosle; Gurudutt Shirale
- Music by: Laxmikant–Pyarelal
- Production company: Mukesh Movies
- Release date: 25 June 1982
- Running time: 121 minutes
- Country: India
- Language: Hindi
- Budget: ₹22 million
- Box office: ₹44 million

Insaan (transl. Human) is a 1982 Indian Hindi-language action drama film directed by Narendra Bedi. The film stars Jeetendra, Vinod Khanna and Reena Roy in the lead roles, with Amjad Khan featuring as the main antagonist. The film was launched in 1976 but faced several delays due to Khanna going to the US, and many other issues.

Insaan finally released on 25 June 1982. .

== Cast ==
- Vinod Khanna as Shankar
- Jeetendra as Ravi
- Reena Roy as Sona
- Amjad Khan as Sher Singh "Sheroo"
- Karan Dewan as Thakur
- Narendra Nath as Thakur Narendra Singh
- Sudhir as Pardhu
- Roopesh Kumar as Roopa
- Asit Sen as Villager Mukerjee
- Viju Khote as Girdhar
- Jayshree T. as Villager Rajni
- Birbal as Balraj ,Ravi's servant
- Amrit Pal as Deva , Sheroo's goon
- Aruna Irani as Dancer Sarita
- Keshto Mukherjee as Seth Ji Gangu
- Kishore Jariwala as Subedaar Saheb
- Master Sameer as Munna

== Soundtrack ==
The music of the film is composed by Laxmikant-Pyarelal, with the lyrics by Anand Bakshi..

Song	Singer
"Koi Na Jab Tera" (Fast)	Kishore Kumar
"Koi Na Jab Tera" (Slow)	Amit Kumar
"Holi Mein Haule Haule Dil Dole, Gori Ne Ghunghat Ke Pat Khole"	Asha Bhosle, Mohammed Rafi, Shailendra Singh
"Saathiya, Tu Mere Sapnon Ka Meet Hai"	Asha Bhosle, Mohammed Rafi
"Pee Li Thodi Bhang, Tabiyat Huyi Malang"	Asha Bhosle, Mohammed Rafi
"Raja Mori Baali Umar"	Asha Bhosle
