= Main Tulsi Tere Aangan Ki =

- Film poster
- Directed by: Raj Khosla
- Screenplay by: Raj Bharti; G.R. Kamath; Suraj Sanim; Dr. Rahi Masoom Reza (dialogue)
- Based on: Ashi Tujhi Preet by Chandrakant Kakodkar
- Produced by: Raj Khosla
- Starring: Nutan; Vinod Khanna; Asha Parekh; Vijay Anand; Deb Mukherjee
- Cinematography: Pratap Sinha
- Edited by: Waman Bhonsle
- Music by: Laxmikant–Pyarelal
- Production companies: Mehboob Studios; Filmistan Studios
- Distributed by: Raj Khosla Films
- Release date: 4 August 1978
- Country: India
- Language: Hindi

Main Tulsi Tere Aangan Ki is a 1978 Indian drama film directed by Raj Khosla and Sudesh Issar. It is based on a Marathi novel titled Ashi Tujhi Preet by Chandrakant Kakodkar. The film won Nutan her 5th and final Filmfare Award in the Best Actress category for which she held a record of most wins for more than 40 years. It was a "Super Hit" at the box office.

== Plot ==
Main Tulsi Tere Aangan Ki is about an aristocrat, Thakur Rajnath Singh Chouhan, who is in love with his mistress Tulsi but forced to marry a strong aristocratic woman named Sanjukta. Tulsi sacrifices her life, some time after giving birth to Rajnath's son Ajay, because she wants Sanjukta to have her husband all to herself. Rajnath and Sanjukta send Ajay to boarding school to prevent him from bearing the stigma of being an illegitimate child. Sanjukta and Rajnath have a son, Pratap. Rajnath dies in a horse-riding accident. Sanjukta makes regular visits to the boarding school to see Ajay and, when he grows up, she brings him home. Ajay meets Naini and falls in love with her after a few misadventures. Sanjukta makes Ajay not only a very important man but also shields him every time and finally confesses before the public that Ajay is her husband's first son and therefore, is entitled to respect. However, her own son Pratap feels slighted and becomes wayward. Some people around them also try to further damage the relations between the two brothers. However, for every sin of the younger brother, Ajay protects him and takes the blame. Sanjukta, not knowing the actual situation, gets disturbed. Pratap seduces Geeta and gets her pregnant and blames Ajay in front of her father, Rana. At one stage, she blames Ajay for every wrong thing which has actually been done by her own son. Ajay leaves the house. But soon thereafter, the situation changes as Rana, standing in support of Pratap, feels deceived as he lets him down by refusing to accept his daughter. In the climax, these men try to kill Pratap in a polo match, but Ajay, who learns of this plan, rescues his brother. Then, Pratap realizes his half-brother's kindness. He surrenders to Ajay and accepts him as his elder brother. The family reunites.

== Cast ==
- Nutan as Sanjukta Chouhan
- Vinod Khanna as Ajay Chouhan
- Asha Parekh as Tulsi
- Vijay Anand as Thakur Rajnath Singh Chouhan
- Deb Mukherjee as Pratap Chouhan
- Aruna Irani as Monisha Chouhan
- Neeta Mehta as Naini
- Jagdish Raj as Agarwal
- Chandrashekhar Dubey as Subramaniam (Accountant)
- Purnima as Rajnath's mother
- Geeta Behl as Geeta
- Trilok Kapoor
- Asit Sen as Naini's father
- Bhagwan as Bhimsingh (Naini's servant)
- Goga Kapoor as Thakur Ajmer Singh
- Hina Kausar as courtesan
- Praveen Paul as Leelabai

== Soundtrack ==
The music is composed by Laxmikant-Pyarelal and lyrics are by Anand Bakshi.

| No. | Title | Singer(s) | Length |
|---|---|---|---|
| 1. | "Chhap Tilak Sab Chhini Re" | Lata Mangeshkar, Asha Bhosle | 5:09 |
| 2. | "Nathaniyan Jo Dali" | Anuradha Paudwal, Hemlata | 4:44 |
| 3. | "Yeh Khidki Jo Band Rahti Hai" | Mohammed Rafi | 4:28 |
| 4. | "Saiyan Rooth Gaye" | Shobha Gurtu | 3:23 |
| 5. | "Main Tulsi Tere Aangan Ki" | Lata Mangeshkar | 4:53 |
| 6. | "Main Tera Kya Le Jaoongi" | Lata Mangeshkar | 1:35 |
| 7. | "Mat Ro Behna" | Lata Mangeshkar | 1:34 |
| Total length: | | | 25:53 |

== Awards ==
26th Filmfare Awards:

Won

- Best Film – Raj Khosla
- Best Actress – Nutan
- Best Dialogue – Rahi Masoom Raza

Nominated

- Best Director – Raj Khosla
- Best Supporting Actress – Asha Parekh
- Best Supporting Actress – Nutan
- Best Lyricist – Anand Bakshi for "Main Tulsi Tere Aangan Ki"
- Best Female Playback Singer — Shobha Gurtu for "Saiyan Rooth Gaye"
- Best Story – Chandrakant Kakodkar

== Reception ==
The film became a success at the box office.

The title song sung by Lata Mangeshkar became an instant classic.
