= Solva Saal =

- Directed by: Raj Khosla
- Written by: Omkar Dogra; Raj Khosla; Bhappi Sonie
- Produced by: Chandrakant C Desai
- Starring: Dev Anand; Waheeda Rehman; Tun Tun; Jagdeep
- Cinematography: Dwarka Divecha
- Music by: S. D. Burman
- Release date: 1958
- Country: India
- Language: Hindi

Solva Saal (English: Sixteenth Year) is a 1958 Hindi movie. Produced by Chandrakant C. Desai, the film is directed by Raj Khosla. Thematically similar to a 1953 American movie Roman Holiday and the Frank Capra's classic It Happened One Night (1934), the film stars Dev Anand and Waheeda Rehman. The film's music is by Sachin Dev Burman and the lyrics by Majrooh Sultanpuri.

This film also contains the song "Hai Apna Dil To Awaara" picturized on Dev Anand and Waheeda Rehman in the train, sung by Hemant Kumar, with mouth organ by Rahul Dev Burman.

Director Raj Khosla makes a cameo appearance in the movie, as a director in a film shooting sequence. Khosla and Waheeda had a loud argument on the set when the latter refused to wear a low neck outfit for a scene. Khosla who had a similar objection to Rehman's contract clause for her first movie C.I.D, stormed out of set. Later shooting was continued after intervention of producers. The two worked again in ‘Sunny’ (1984).

== Cast ==
- Dev Anand as Prannath Kashyap
- Waheeda Rehman as Laaj
- Bipin Gupta as Shankarlal
- Sunder as Gogi
- Jagdeep as Child Artist
- Bir Sakuja as Biharilal
- Kammo as Miss Neena (Shyam's Girlfriend)
- Sheila Vaz as Dancer in 'Dekho Mohe Laga Solva Saal'
- Raj Khosla as himself (cameo)

== Plot ==
Laaj whose father has arranged her matrimonial alliance to his doctor friend's acquaintance, takes a family heirloom; pearl necklaces and elopes with her beau Shyam to Bombay. On the train, a crafty journalist named Prannath Kashyap overhears the lovers' plans and follows them in search of a story. Then Shyam gets off the train and runs off with the necklace.

In pursuit of Shyam and to recover the necklace, Prannath comes to her rescue. What follows is a song-filled caper of intrigue, adventure and romance, all set in one eventful night. Prannath helps Laaj to get out of problematic situations. First on the railway track, then when Laaj is depressed, she tries to commit suicide by jumping into the sea. A brief interlude with the taxi drivers, who put themselves on the track of Shyam and with twists-n-turns, the necklace is retrieved and Laaj reaches home in time before her father wakes up and notices her absence. Young Laaj is wiser by the events of the night and realises that her Beau was only interested in her wealth. She agrees to go with her father to see him off at the airport who was going to Bangalore to settle the alliance with boy's mother. He plans to meet the prospective boy and introduce him to Laaj, as he was coming there with his doctor friend.

As father and subdued Laaj is waiting at the airport he says to her "the boy I want you to marry is a nice guy, I like him a lot, but I want you to see him and decide". As the boy and doctor approaches them the boy looks at Laaj and stops, smilingly he says "she is the same". Approaching the father daughter duo, the doctor introduces the boy and as the Laaj looks up towards the boy she swoons and then smiles. Laaj and the boy smile mischievously as they make small talk. She gives her consent to the alliance and finds that the life is full of surprises after all.

== Soundtrack ==
All the songs were composed by S. D. Burman and lyrics were penned by Majrooh Sultanpuri.

In one scene Waheeda Rehman says to Dev Anand that his name should have been Hemant Kumar instead of Prannath as he sings so well.

In another scene Tun Tun as an aspiring singer sings a song 'Murali bairan bhai' from film New Delhi, originally sung by Lata Mangeshkar.

Song	Singer
"Hai Apna Dil To Awara" – 1	Hemant Kumar
"Hai Apna Dil To Awara" – 2	Hemant Kumar
"Yahi To Hai Woh"	Mohammed Rafi
"Dekho Ji Mera Haal, Badal Gayi Chaal, Dekho Mohe Laga Solva Saal"	Mohammed Rafi, Asha Bhosle, Sudha Malhotra
"Yeh Bhi Koi Ruthne Ka"	Asha Bhosle
"Nazar Ki Katari Yeh"	Asha Bhosle
