= Raj Khosla =

Indian filmmaker (1925–1991)

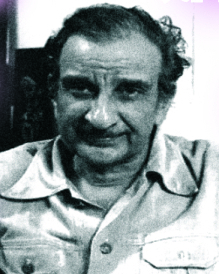
- Khosla in 1979
- Born: Desraj Khosla; 31 May 1925; Rahon, Punjab, British India
- Died: 9 June 1991 (aged 66); Bombay, Maharashtra, India
- Occupations: Film director, producer, screenwriter
- Years active: 1949-1989
- Spouse: Usha
- Children: Anita Khosla Puri (daughter); Uma Khosla Kapoor (daughter); Sonia Khosla Vinayak (daughter); Sunita Khosla Bhalla (daughter); Reena Khosla Kataria (daughter); Milan Luthria (son)

Raj Khosla (born Desraj Khosla; 31 May 1925 – 9 June 1991) was one of the top directors, producers and screenwriters in Hindi film industry from the 1950s to the 1980s. He was known for bringing in "neo-noir" and style in Indian cinema, and also as a "women's director" because he showcased actresses at their best. He has given many successful films with Dev Anand. Starting his career under Guru Dutt, he went on to make hit films like, C.I.D. (1956), Woh Kaun Thi? (1964), Mera Saaya (1966), Mera Gaon Mera Desh (1971), Dostana (1980) and Main Tulsi Tere Aangan Ki (1978), the last of which won the Filmfare Award for Best Film. His early background in classical music ensured that most of his films excelled in music. Khosla along with Guru Dutt and Vijay Anand were inspired by Alfred Hitchcock school of Mystery Suspense Thrillers.

== Early life ==
Born as Desraj Khosla in Rahon, Punjab, on 31 May 1925, he was trained to be a classical singer. He came to Bombay to look for work as a singer while working in All India Radio for while as a music staff.

== Film career ==
Having arrived in Bombay to become a singer, he sang the song "Madhur Suron Mein Suno Jhamela..." for the film Bhool Bhulaiyan (1949) under the music baton of Bulo C. Rani and lyrics of Butaram Sharma. Likewise, he also sang the lyrics of B. D. Mishra : "Rail Mein Jiya Mora Sananana Hoye Re..." in Ankhen (1950) which was the first film of Madan Mohan as an independent music director, someone with whom Khosla went on to make some of his best soundtracks in the coming years. However, his career as a singer failed to take off. Soon Dev Anand felt he had other talents and hired him to be Guru Dutt's assistant on films, and eventually he became director. His most famous films are C.I.D. (1956) (which introduced Waheeda Rehman to Hindi audiences and made her a star), Woh Kaun Thi? (1964) (which gave Sadhana her signature role of the "mystery girl"), Do Badan (1966) (which made Asha Parekh into a serious actress and won Simi Garewal the Filmfare Award for Best Supporting Actress), Do Raaste (1969) (which made Mumtaz into a household name), Main Tulsi Tere Aangan Ki (1978) (which won Nutan the Filmfare Award for Best Actress at a mature age).

On Dev Anand's advice to take up direction, he became Guru Dutt's assistant. His directorial debut Milap (starring Dev Anand and Geeta Bali) in 1954 didn't click at the box office. But his second film, C.I.D., released in 1956 set the ball rolling and the young director never looked back.

He was known for his excellent song picturizations, probably stemming from his musical background. Raj Khosla initially entered the film Industry with hopes of making it as a playback singer. In most of his films he would have at least a song based on folk tune e.g. C.I.D., Bambai Ka Babu, Solva Saal, Mera Saaya, Do Raaste, Mera Gaon Mera Desh to name a few.

He assisted Guru Dutt and in 1954 got a break with Milap, starring Dev Anand and Geeta Bali. In this film, not only Raj Khosla made a debut as a director, but a new music director, N. Dutta gave debut music. Despite excellent music, the film failed to create waves. Khosla's second film produced for him by mentor Guru Dutt, C.I.D. (1956) propelled him into the big league. C.I.D. was a slick crime thriller that highlighted Khosla's stylish shot taking and innovative song picturization, something passed down from Guru Dutt.

From here onwards even as he continued to make films, Khosla ricocheted from style to style while adding his own touch to each genre. Never wanting to play safe Khosla made some films, which were startlingly different in those times. Solva Saal (1958) was a story of a single night wherein a girl elopes with her lover who dupes her and is helped back home by a journalist before her father wakes up and realizes what the girl has done. He also acted in the role of a film director within the film itself. Bambai Ka Babu (1960) had the hero, a killer, entering the family of the man he has killed as their long lost son and falling in love with his "sister".

Khosla explored a variety of styles be it crime thrillers (C.I.D., Kala Pani (1958)), musicals (Ek Musafir Ek Hasina (1962) – whose starting point was seven songs composed by O. P. Nayyar), suspense thrillers (Woh Kaun Thi? (1964), Mera Saaya (1966), Anita (1967) – his mystery trilogy with actress Sadhana), melodramas (Do Badan (1966), Do Raaste (1969)) or dacoit dramas (Mera Gaon Mera Desh (1971) – which inspired Sholay (1975)).

He made films after Mera Gaon Mera Desh and had hits like Prem Kahani (1975) starring the then hottest pair of the day Rajesh Khanna and Mumtaz, Nehle Pe Dehla (1976) and Main Tulsi Tere Aangan Ki (1978)

In Main Tulsi Tere Aangan Ki, he evoked sympathy for the mistress even as he told the story from the wife's point of view. Khosla was a director who understood women and was known as a "women's director" much like George Cukor in Hollywood.

After enjoying big hits like Main Tulsi Tere Aangan Ki and Dostana (1980) with Amitabh Bachchan, Zeenat Aman and Shatrughan Sinha, Khosla ran into some rough weather as his other films started flopping. A dispirited Khosla took refuge in alcohol and died in Bombay on 9 June 1991, totally disillusioned with the film industry.

== Legacy ==
After his death "The Raj Khosla Foundation" was established by his daughter Sunita Khosla Bhalla, with Shatrughan Sinha, as its chairman, and members like Manoj Kumar, Moushumi Chatterjee, Kabir Bedi, Mahesh Bhatt, Amit Khanna and Johnny Bakshi.

== Awards and nominations ==
Year	Award	Category	Film	Result
1971	Filmfare Awards	Best Director	Do Raaste	Nominated
1979	Filmfare Awards	Best Director	Main Tulsi Tere Aangan Ki	Nominated
1979	Filmfare Awards	Best Film	Main Tulsi Tere Aangan Ki	Won

== Government recognition ==
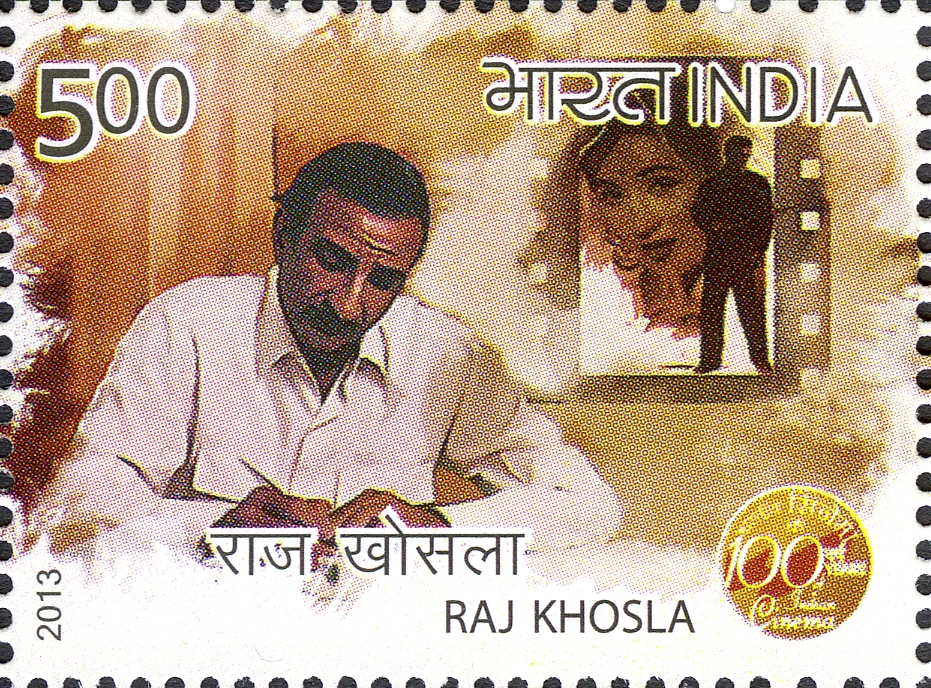
Khosla on 2013 stamp of India

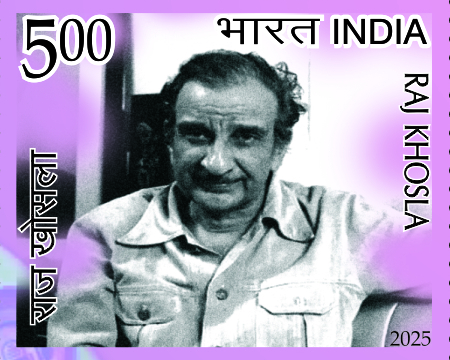
2025

A postage stamp, bearing his face, was released by India Post to honour him on 3 May 2013 and 1 May 2025.

The 56th International Film Festival of India taking place from 20 to 28 November 2025, will celebrate centenary and pay tribute to Raj Khosla by screening his classic films.

== Filmography ==
Singer

Year	Film	Song	Lyricist	Music Director
1949	Bhool Bhulaiyan	"Madhur Suron Mein Suno Jhamela..."	Butaram Sharma	Bulo C. Rani
1950	Ankhen	"Rail Mein Jiya Mora Sananana Hoye Re..."	B. D. Mishra	Madan Mohan

Director

Year	Film	Notes
1955	Milap	Directorial debut
1956	C.I.D.	
1958	Kala Pani	
1958	Solva Saal	Also acted in the role of a film director within the film itself
1960	Bombai Ka Babu	
1962	Ek Musafir Ek Hasina	
1964	Woh Kaun Thi?	
1966	Mera Saaya	
1966	Do Badan	
1967	Anita	
1969	Chirag	
1969	Do Raaste	
1971	Mera Gaon Mera Desh	
1973	Shareef Budmaash	
1973	Kuchhe Dhaage	
1975	Prem Kahani	
1976	Nehle Pe Dehla	
1978	Main Tulsi Tere Aangan Ki	
1980	Do Premee	
1980	Dostana	
1981	Daasi	
1982	Teri Maang Sitaron Se Bhar Doon	
1983	Maati Maange Khoon	
1984	Sunny	
1984	Meraa Dost Meraa Dushman	
1989	Naqaab	Last film as a director

Producer

- Do Chor (1972)
