= Laxmikant–Pyarelal =

Indian composer duo

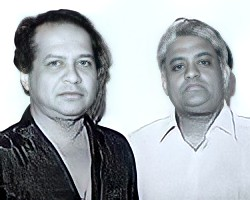
- Laxmikant (left); Pyarelal (right)

Background information
- Also known as: L–P, Laxmi–Pyare
- Genres: Film score, film songs
- Occupations: Composer, music director, orchestrator, conductor
- Years active: 1963–1998

Laxmikant–Pyarelal (also known as L-P) were an Indian composer duo, consisting of Laxmikant Shantaram Kudalkar (1937–1998) and Pyarelal Ramprasad Sharma (born 1940). In their career span, stretching from 1963 to 1998, they composed music for about 750 movies, working with several prominent film-makers.

== Early life ==
=== Laxmikant Kudalkar ===
Laxmikant Kudalkar
- Born: लक्ष्मीकांत शांताराम कुडाळकर; Laxmikant Shantaram Kudalkar; 3 November 1937; Bombay, Bombay Presidency, British India (now Mumbai, Maharashtra, India)
- Died: 25 May 1998 (aged 60) Mumbai, Maharashtra, India
- Years active: 1947–1998

Laxmikant Shantaram Kudalkar was born on the day of Laxmi Pujan, Dipawali on 3 November 1937. Probably, because of the day of his birth, his parents named him Laxmikant, which is a name of Lord Vishnu, consort of Goddess Laxmi. His father died when he was a child. Because of the poor financial condition of the family he could not complete his academic education either. Laxmikant's father's friend, a musician himself, advised Laxmikant and his elder brother to learn music. Accordingly, Laxmikant learned to play the mandolin and his elder brother learned to play the tabla. He spent two years in the company of the well-known mandolin player Hussain Ali. He began organising and performing in Indian Classical instrumental music concerts to earn some money. Later, in the 1940s, he also learned mandolin from Bal Mukund Indorker and violin from Husnalal (of the Husanlal Bhagatram fame). Laxmikant began his film career as a child actor in the films Bhakt Pundalik (1949) and Aankhen (1950). He also acted in some Gujarati films.

=== Pyarelal Sharma ===
Pyarelal Sharma
- Born: प्यारेलाल रामप्रसाद शर्मा Pyarelal Ramprasad Sharma; 3 September 1940 (age 86); Bombay, Bombay Province, British India
- Years active: 1952–present
- Awards: Padma Bhushan (2024)

Pyarelal Ramprasad Sharma (born 3 September 1940) is the son of a renowned trumpeter Pandit Ramprasad Sharma (popularly known as Babaji), who taught him the basics of music. He started learning violin at the age of 8 and practised it 8 to 12 hours daily. He learnt to play violin from a Goan musician named Anthony Gonsalves. The song "My Name Is Anthony Gonsalves" from the movie Amar Akbar Anthony is regarded as a tribute to Mr. Gonsalves (the movie had music by Laxmikant–Pyarelal).

== Music career ==
=== 1960s: Rise to prominence ===
Laxmikant–Pyarelal begin their career in 1963 by composing music for Babubhai Mistri's Parasmani. It proved to be financially successful and two songs from the film, "Hansta Hua Noorani Chehra, Kali Zulfen, Rang Sunehra" and "Woh Jab Yaad Aaye, Bahut Yaad Aaye" were superhits and part of the year-end annual list of Binaca Geetmala. They established themselves the following year when they composed the soundtrack of Rajshri Productions's blockbuster musical drama film Dosti. Its songs, "Jaanewalon Zara Mudke Dekho Mujhe", "Chaahunga Main Tujhe Sanjh Savere", "Mera To Jo Bhi Kadam Hai", "Koi Jab Raah Na Paaye", all solos by Mohammed Rafi were chartbusters which made Dosti one of the best-selling Hindi film albums of the 1960s and won Laxmikant–Pyarelal their maiden Filmfare Award for Best Music Director. Apart from Dosti, their other musical hits during this period were Mr. X in Bombay (1964) and Aaye Din Bahar Ke (1966), both of which had chartbuster songs, such as "Mere Mehboob Qayamat Hogi", "Khoobsurat Haseena Jaan-E-Jaan Jaan-E-Man" in the former and "Mere Dushman Tu Meri Dosti", "Suno Sajna" in the latter.

In 1967, they scored music for Shagird, Patthar Ke Sanam, Night in London, Milan and Farz, all of which were among the top-earners of the year, which was attributed to their melodious soundtrack, especially the Jeetendra starrer spy thriller Farz whose songs, such as "Baar Baar Din Ye Aaye – Happy Birthday To You", "Hum To Tere Aashiq Hain", "Mast Baharon Ka Main Aashiq" and "Tumse O Haseena" were rage among the masses and made its soundtrack one of the best-selling Hindi film album of the 1960s. For the Sunil Dutt fronted reincarnation drama Milan, they received their second Filmfare Award for Best Music Director. Two songs from the film "Sawan Ka Mahina" and "Yug Yug Se", both duets by Mukesh and Lata Mangeshkar topped the year-end annual list of Binaca Geetmala.

Laxmikant–Pyarelal concluded the decade with Mere Hamdam Mere Dost (1968), Izzat (1968), Intaqam (1969), Aya Sawan Jhoom Ke (1969), Dharti Kahe Pukar Ke (1969), Anjaana (1969), Jeene Ki Raah (1969) and Do Raaste (1969). While, the first five albums were hits, the last two proved to be huge chartbusters. The music of Do Raaste was such a rage that it helped the film to become the first Indian film to gross £100,000 in the UK, equivalent to ₹900,000 (US$118,940.64). Notable songs from these films, included "Chhalka Yeh Jaam", "Yeh Dil Tum Bin Kahin Lagta Nahin", "Kya Miliye Aise Logon Se", "Aa Jaane Jaan", "Kaise Rahoon Chup Ki Meine Pee Hi Kya Hai", "Saathiya Nahin Jaana", "Aya Sawan Jhoom Ke", "Je Ham Tum Chori Se Bandhe Ek Dori Se", "Rim Jhim Ke Geet Sawan Gaye", "Aane Se Uske Aaye Bahar", "Bindiya Chamke Gi Chudi Khanke Gi" and "Yeh Reshmi Zulfen". At the 17th Filmfare Awards, they got nominated in the Filmfare Award for Best Music Director category for both Jeene Ki Raah and Do Raaste and they won it for the former. With continuous success in the late-1960s, Laxmikant–Pyarelal entered the big league and eventually overtook Shankar–Jaikishan, who had ruled the roost from 1949 onwards.

=== 1970s: Competition from contemporaries ===
In the early-1970s, Laxmikant–Pyarelal faced competition from R. D. Burman whose electronic rock compositions revolutionized the Hindi film music and he emerged as top favorite of superstar Rajesh Khanna and various other filmmakers, such as Shakti Samanta, Nasir Hussain, Anand Brothers, Ravikant Nagaich and Gulzar, among others and composed for majority of their films.

Despite this, Laxmikant–Pyarelal continued to deliver musical hits, including Mohan Kumar's romantic drama Aap Aye Bahaar Ayee (1971), which had Rajendra Kumar in the lead role, Satyen Bose's crime drama Jeevan Mrityu (1970) and Raj Khosla's action drama Mera Gaon Mera Desh (1971), both starring Dharmendra, Mukul Dutt's romance Aan Milo Sajna (1970) and M. A. Thirumugam's comedy drama Haathi Mere Saathi (1971), both having Rajesh Khanna in the lead. The soundtracks of Aan Milo Sajna and Jeevan Mrityu were highly successful and two of the best-selling Hindi film albums of the year, respectively. On the other hand, the music of Haathi Mere Saathi was an even bigger chartbuster and among the best-selling Bollywood albums of the 1970s. In 1972, they composed for Manoj Kumar's third directional venture Shor. One of its song "Ek Pyar Ka Nagma Hai", a duet by Mangeshkar and Mukesh with lyrics written by Santosh Anand emerged a mass favorite and got Laxmikant–Pyarelal another nomination in the Filmfare Award for Best Music Director category. Apart from Shor, their other notable works that year were in Raja Jani, Gora Aur Kala, Piya Ka Ghar and Jeet, which had evergreen melodies "Aa Aaja Aaja", a solo by Mangeshkar, "Dheere Dheere Bol, Koi Sun Na Le", a duet by Mukesh and Mangeshkar, "Yeh Jeevan Hai", sung by Kishore Kumar and "Chal Prem Nagar", a duet by Mohammed Rafi and Mangeshkar, respectively.

The year 1973 proved to be milestone year in their career as they got the chance to compose for Raj Kapoor's romantic musical Bobby. The songs of the film like "Main Shayar To Nahin", "Hum Tum Ek Kamre Mein Band Ho", "Mujhe Kuchh Kehna Hai", "Na Mangun Sona Chandi" were huge chartbusters and remain popular till date. The popularity of its songs made Bobby an All Time Blockbuster at the box office and its soundtrack, the best-selling Hindi film album of the decade. Apart from Bobby, they also delivered blockbuster music for Yash Chopra's romantic drama Daag: A Poem of Love and A. Bhimsingh's actioner Loafer, both of which had memorable songs like "Ab Chahe Ma Roothe Yaa Baba" and "Mere Dil Mein Aaj Kya Hai" in the former, "Aaj Mausam Bada Be-Imaan Hai" and "Koi Shehri Babu" in the latter. For Bobby and Daag, Laxmikant–Pyarelal received two more nominations in the Filmfare Award for Best Music Director category. They continued their success streak in the mid-1970s by delivering notable songs in films, such as Roti Kapada Aur Makaan (1974), Dost (1974), Amir Garib (1974), Imtihan (1974), Roti (1974), Dulhan (1974), Majboor (1974), Prem Kahani (1975), Pratiggya (1975), Jaaneman (1976), Nagin (1976), Charas (1976) and Dus Numbri (1976). For Roti Kapada Aur Makaan and Dulhan, they received two more nominations for Filmfare Award for Best Music Director. Apart from critical appreciation and commercial success, the soundtrack of Roti Kapada Aur Makaan proved to be another feather in the cap of Laxmikant–Pyarelal as it emerged the fifth best-selling Hindi film album of the 1970s and its songs "Mehngai Mar Gayi" and "Hai Hai Yeh Majboori" took 1st and 2nd spot at the year-end annual list of Binaca Geetmala, respectively. Other memorable songs composed by the duo during this phase were "Gaadi Bula Rahi Hai" (Dost), "Ruk Jana Nahin" (Imtihan), "Yeh Public Hai" (Roti), "Aadmi Jo Kehta Hai" (Majboor), "Jaaneman Jaaneman" (Jaaneman), all solos by Kishore Kumar, "Baith Ja Khadi Ho Ja" (Amir Garib), "Gore Range Pe Na Itna" (Roti), "Prem Kahani Mein" (Prem Kahani), "Kal Ki Haseen Mulaqat Ke Liye" (Charas), all duets by Kumar and Mangeshkar, "Main Jat Yamla Pagla Deewana" (Pratiggya), a solo by Rafi and "Yeh Duniya Ek Numbri" (Dus Numbri), a solo by Mukesh.

The final years of the decade saw the trend change from romantic to action oriented multi-starrers with filmmakers like Manmohan Desai and Prakash Mehra leading the road. In 1977, Laxmikant–Pyarelal composed for four films of Manmohan Desai, which were - Amar Akbar Anthony, Parvarish, Dharam Veer and Chacha Bhatija. They made Mohammed Rafi sing majority of the songs as he was going through a rough patch owing to the meteoric rise of Kishore Kumar post-Aradhana (1969). At release, all the four films proved to be huge commercial successes, especially Amar Akbar Anthony and Dharam Veer, both of which were mega blockbusters. The songs of Amar Akbar Anthony like "Parda Hai Parda", "Taiyabali Pyar Ka Dushman" and "Shirdi Wale Sai Baba", all three solos by Rafi were huge hits among the masses and marked his comeback. The cherry on the top were the chartbuster songs of Dharam Veer - "O Meri Mehbooba" and "Main Galiyon Ka Raja", again both solos by Rafi. The soundtracks of Amar Akbar Anthony and Dharam Veer were the seventh and ninth best-selling Hindi film album of the 1970s, respectively. For the former, Laxmikant–Pyarelal won their fourth Filmfare Award for Best Music Director. Their other hit songs of the year, include "Yaar Dildar Tujhe Kaisa Chahiye" (Chhailla Babu), "Aate Jate Khoobsurat Awara" (Anurodh), "Dream Girl" (Dream Girl), "Aadmi Musafir Hai" (Apnapan) and "Teri Meri Shadi Seedi Saadi" (Dildaar). In 1978, they reunited with Raj Kapoor and Raj Khosla for Satyam Shivam Sundaram and Main Tulsi Tere Aangan Ki, respectively. Music of both the films opened to acclaim from critics as well as the audience. For the former, Laxmikant–Pyarelal won their second consecutive Filmfare Award for Best Music Director. In 1979, they composed for K. Vishwanath's Sargam, Mohan Sehgal's Kartavya, R. Krishnamurthy and K. Vijayan's Amar Deep, Rajkumar Kohli's Jaani Dushman and Manmohan Desai's Suhaag. All the five films had a number of hit songs, such as "Dafli Wale Dafli Baja" and "Hum To Chale Pardes, Hum Pardesi Ho Gaye" (both Sargam), "Teri Rab Ne Bana Di Jodi" and "Ae Yaar Sun, Yaari Teri" (both Suhaag), "Chanda Mama Se Pyara Mera Mama" and "Doori Na Rahe Koi" (both Kartavya), "Chalo Re, Doli Uthao Kahaar" and "Tere Haathon Mein Pehnaake Chudiyan" (both Jaani Dushman), "Duniya Mein Sada" and "Koi Na Tere Pehle Thi" (both Amar Deep). The music of Sargam was one of the best-selling Bollywood album of the decade and won Laxmikant–Pyarelal their sixth Filmfare Award for Best Music Director.

Despite facing competition from R. D. Burman in the beginning of decade, Laxmikant–Pyarelal emerged as the best-selling music composers of the 1970s with maximum number of songs in the year-end annual list of Binaca Geetmala from 1970 to 1979.

=== 1980s: Continued success ===
Laxmikant–Pyarelal began the new decade with films, such as Aasha, Karz, Dostana and Judaai, all four of which had lyrics written by Anand Bakshi. At the box office, they emerged successful and their songs proved to be hugely popular among the masses, which were - "Sheesha Ho Ya Dil Ho" and "Tune Mujhe Bulaya Sherawaliye" (Aasha), "Om Shanti Om", "Paisa Yeh Paisa", "Ek Hasina Thi" and "Dard-E-Dil, Dard-E-Jigar Dil Mein Jagaaya Aap Ne" (Karz), "Salamat Rahe Dostana Hamara", "Mere Dost Kissa Yeh Kya Ho Gaya" and "Dillagi Ne Di Hawa" (Dostana), "Mar Gayi Mujhe Teri Judaai" and "Mausam Suhane Aa Gaye, Pyar Ke Zamane Aa Gaye" (Judaai). The soundtracks of Karz and Aasha proved to be two of the best-selling Hindi film albums of the 1980s with Laxmikant–Pyarelal winning their fourth consecutive Filmfare Award for Best Music Director for the former. They continued their winning streak from 1981 to 1983 by composing highly popular numbers in blockbusters, such as "Zindagi Ki Na Toote Ladi" and "Durga Hai Meri Maa" (Kranti), "John Jani Janardan" and "Mere Naseeb Mein" (Naseeb), "Tere Mere Beech Mein", "Hum Bane Tum Bane Ek Duuje Ke Liye" and "Solah Baras Ki" (Ek Duuje Ke Liye), "Bhanware Ne Khilaaya Phool", "Main Hoon Prem Rogi" and "Yeh Galiyan Yeh Chaubara" (Prem Rog), ""Lambi Judaai" and "Tu Mera Hero Hai" (Hero), "Andhaa Kaanoon" and "Rote Rote" (Andhaa Kaanoon), "Din, Maheene, Saal Guzarte Jayenge" and "Chalo, Bulaawa Aaya Hai, Maata Ne Bulaaya Hai" (Avtaar), "Sari Duniya Ka Bojh Hum Uthate Hai", "Lambuji Tinguji" and "Humka Ishq Hua" (Coolie). For Ek Duuje Ke Liye (1981), Prem Rog (1982) and Hero (1983), Laxmikant–Pyarelal received three successive Filmfare Award for Best Music Director nominations and their soundtracks emerged as three of the best-selling Bollywood albums of the decade along with that of Kranti (1981) and Naseeb (1981).

With composers like R. D. Burman and Kalyanji-Anandji running out of steam post the early-1980s, Laxmikant–Pyarelal emerged as leading music directors of the time, eventually delivering a string of musical hits throughout the decade.

In 1984, their notable compositions, included critically acclaimed ventures like Tinnu Anand's Muslim social Yeh Ishq Nahin Aasaan, Girish Karnad's erotic drama Utsav and K. Bapaiah's commercially successful family drama Ghar Ek Mandir. In the mid-1980s, they delivered music in films like Pyar Jhukta Nahin (1985), Ghulami (1985), Meri Jung (1985), Sur Sangam (1985), Sanjog (1985), Teri Meherbaniyan (1985), Nagina (1986), Swarag Se Sunder (1986), Aakhree Raasta (1986), Karma (1986), Naam (1986), Naache Mayuri (1986), Love 86 (1986), Hukumat (1987), Sindoor (1987), Parivaar (1987) and Mr. India (1987). The songs from these films, such as "Tum Se Mil Kar Na Jaane Kyon", "Chaahe Laakh Toofaan Aayen", "Zeehale - E - Miskin Makun ba-Ranjish", "Zindagi Har Kadam", "Dil Bekraar Tha Dil Bekraar Hai", "Yashoda Ka Nand Lala", "Teri Meherbaniyan", "Main Ka Piya Bulaave Apne Mandirwa", "Gori Ka Saajan Saajan Ki Gori", "Har Karam Apna Karenge", "Chiththi Aayi Aayi Hai Chiththi Aayi Hai", "Tu Kal Chala Jaayega To Main Kya Karunga", "Na Tum Ne Kiya Na Maine Kiya", "Mehboob Se Hamare", "Ram Ram Bol", "Naam Sare Mujhe Bhool Jane Lage", "Tu Nache Main Gaoon", "Zindagi Ek Dard Hai", "Baat Pate Ki Kahe Madaari", "Hawa Hawai", "Karte Hain Hum Pyaar Mr. India Se" and "Zindagi Ki Yahi Reet Hai", topped the year-end annual list of Binaca Geetmala. For their music in "Pyar Jhukta Nahin", "Meri Jung" and "Sur Sangam", Laxmikant–Pyarelal received three Filmfare Award for Best Music Director nominations in the same year. Also, the soundtrack of Pyar Jhukta Nahin proved to be the tenth best-selling Hindi film album of the 1980s.

In 1988 and 1989, they composed for N. Chandra's Tezaab and Subhash Ghai's Ram Lakhan, respectively. Songs from both films emerged chartbusters and played a major role in their box office success and making Madhuri Dixit an overnight sensation. Both the films also earned Laxmikant–Pyarelal nominations in the Filmfare Award for Best Music Director category and were two of the best-selling Hindi film albums of the 1980s thus making them the highest-selling music directors for another decade.

=== 1990s: Later career ===
With the arrival of new music directors and new stars and change in taste of music, Laxmikant–Pyarelal saw a decreased workload in the 1990s, but still delivered some of their most memorable numbers in this decade.

After a dull beginning to the decade, they composed music for three major hits in 1991 which were - Saudagar, Hum and Narsimha. The songs from the film, "Imli Ka Boota" and "Ilu Ilu" (Saudagar), "Jumma Chumma De De", "Kagaz Kalam Davaat" and "Ek Doosre Se Karte Hain Pyaar Hum (Hum), "Jao Tum Chahe Jahan" and "Hum Se Tum Dosti Kar Lo" (Narsimha) were huge hits among the masses and remain popular till date. For Saudagar, Laxmikant–Pyarelal received another nomination in the Filmfare Award for Best Music Director category, also the soundtracks of all the three films were among the best-selling Hindi film albums of the year. The following year, they delivered two more musical hits in Khuda Gawah and Prem Deewane, both of which received acclaim for their melodious songs and topped the sales-chart as well as the year-end annual list of Binaca Geetmala.

Laxmikant–Pyarelal then composed music for Khalnayak (1993), Tirangaa (1993), Gumrah (1993), Aashik Awara (1993) and Trimurti (1995), all four of which again had superhit songs, such as "Choli Ke Peeche Kya Hai" and "Khal Nayak Hoon Main" (Khalnayak), "Pee Le Pee Le Oh More Raja, Pee Le Pee Le Oh More Jani" and "Ise Samjho Na Resham Ka Taar" (Tirangaa), "Main Tera Ashiq Hoon" and "Tere Pyar Ko Salam O Sanam" (Gumrah), "Maine Pyar Kar Liya" and "Main Hoon Aashik" (Aashik Awara), "Mujhe Pyaar Karo" and "Bol Bol Bol" (Trimurti). For Khalnayak, Laxmikant–Pyarelal received their final nomination in the Filmfare Award for Best Music Director category. The soundtracks of Khalnayak and Trimurti were among the best-selling Bollywood albums of 1993 and 1995, respectively. In the late-1990s, Laxmikant–Pyarelal's career graph declined as most of the films they composed music for, such as Bhairavi (1996), Prem Granth (1996), Aurat Aurat Aurat (1996) and Mahaanta (1997) proved to be box office flops. Their standalone success during this period was David Dhawan's 1997 directional Deewana Mastana, which emerged a hit and had popular songs like "Tere Bina Dil Lagta Nahin" and "Dil Chaahe Kisi Se".

With Laxmikant's death in 1998, the duo's 35 years long partnership came to an end. Their last composition together was in the long-delayed film Meri Biwi Ka Jawaab Nahin (2004), which released 6 years after Laxmikant's death.

== After Laxmikant's death ==
After Laxmikant's death, Pyarelal has done some work independently. Yet, Pyarelal always used the name 'Laxmikant–Pyarelal' for all the future compositions. When the playback singer Kumar Sanu turned music director, he approached Pyarelal to arrange music for him. Pyarelal was approached to assist in the music of Farah Khan's Om Shanti Om song "Dhoom Tana". In 2009 Pyarelal won the Sachin Dev Burman International Award for Creative Sound and Music at the Pune Film Festival. Pyarelal has done a show with Kakas Entertainment called Maestros: A musical Journey of Laxmikant–Pyarelal.

== Style ==
Laxmikant–Pyarelal experimented with different genres, such as creating a disco-like sound for the film Karz (1980). They also westernized a ghazal for the same film, "Dard-e-dil Dard-e-jigar". They were also known for using large orchestras. For example, they used around 72 violinists for the song "Chanchal Sheetal Nirmal Komal" from Satyam Shivam Sundaram (1978).

== Awards ==
Padma Bhushan (2024)
Filmfare Awards

Wins

- 1965 – Best Music Director – Dosti
- 1968 – Best Music Director – Milan
- 1970 – Best Music Director – Jeene Ki Raah
- 1978 – Best Music Director – Amar Akbar Anthony
- 1979 – Best Music Director – Satyam Shivam Sundaram
- 1980 – Best Music Director – Sargam
- 1981 – Best Music Director – Karz

Nominations

- 1970 – Best Music Director – Do Raaste
- 1973 – Best Music Director – Shor
- 1974 – Best Music Director – Bobby
- 1974 – Best Music Director – Daag: A Poem of Love
- 1975 – Best Music Director – Roti Kapada Aur Makaan
- 1976 – Best Music Director – Dulhan
- 1980 – Best Music Director – Jaani Dushman
- 1981 – Best Music Director – Aasha
- 1982 – Best Music Director – Ek Duuje Ke Liye
- 1983 – Best Music Director – Prem Rog
- 1984 – Best Music Director – Hero
- 1986 – Best Music Director – Pyar Jhukta Nahin
- 1986 – Best Music Director – Meri Jung
- 1986 – Best Music Director – Sur Sangam
- 1989 – Best Music Director – Tezaab
- 1990 – Best Music Director – Ram Lakhan
- 1992 – Best Music Director – Saudagar
- 1994 – Best Music Director – Khalnayak

Bengal Film Journalists' Association Awards

Win

- 1967 – Best Music Director – Milan

== Sales ==
The following table lists the sales of Laxmikant–Pyarelal's top-selling Hindi film music soundtrack albums in India.

Year	Film	Sales	Annual Rank	Notes
1973	Bobby	1,000,000	1	
1987	Mr. India	2,500,000	1	
1988	Tezaab	8,000,000	2	
1990	Hum	1,500,000	7	
1991	Saudagar	3,000,000	4	
1991	Narsimha	1,800,000	10	
1992	Khuda Gawah	1,800,000	9	
1992	Prem Deewane	1,800,000	10	
1993	Khalnayak	3,500,000	3	
1995	Trimurti	2,000,000	11	
Known album sales	—N/a	26,900,000	—N/a	

== Achievements ==
- Bobby has been rated the 17th best soundtrack ever by Planet Bollywood on their "100 Greatest Bollywood Soundtracks". Other soundtracks in the list include Amar Akbar Anthony (25), Roti Kapada Aur Makaan (27), Dosti (32), Hero (36), Ek Duuje Ke Liye (44), Karz (50), Ram Lakhan (59), Kranti (61), Tezaab (65), Do Raaste (74), Milan (75), Khalnayak (77) and Prem Rog (85).

== Frequent collaborations ==
Laxmikant–Pyarelal worked with several successful directors of Indian cinema in a career spanning almost 35 years. They frequently teamed up with Manmohan Desai, Subhash Ghai, Raj Khosla, Mohan Kumar, K. Viswanath, Mukul Anand, J. Om Prakash, J. P. Dutta, Dulal Guha, Satyen Bose and T. Rama Rao. They also worked with Raj Kapoor (3 films), Manoj Kumar (3 films), Basu Chatterjee (3 films), Mahesh Bhatt (3 films), Asit Sen (3 films), Hrishikesh Mukherjee (2 films), Ramanand Sagar (2 films), Vijay Anand (2 films) and Yash Chopra (1 film).

Mohammed Rafi gave Laxmikant–Pyarelal their first big break with Dosti (1964) and they together delivered a huge number of memorable songs. When Rafi was going through a rough patch in the early-1970s, they played a major role in his comeback. They were also instrumental in making him the playback voice for Dharmendra and Jeetendra beginning from the 1960s. Even Rafi's last recorded song "Tu Kahin Aas Paas Hai Dost" (Aas Paas) had music by Laxmikant–Pyarelal. Apart from Rafi, they also shared great rapport with Kishore Kumar, Lata Mangeshkar, Mukesh and lyricist Anand Bakshi with whom they worked in 302 films. Bakshi made his singing debut for Laxmikant–Pyarelal in Mome Ki Gudiya (1972), and then sang in Charas (1976) with a total of three songs, all hits. None of the four songs he sang for other music directors were hits.

== Controversy ==
=== Plagiarism allegations ===
Some of Laxmikant–Pyarelal's songs featured the tunes of popular foreign-language songs, such as "Ek Rasta Do Rahi" from Ram Balram (1980) was inspired by KC and the Sunshine Band's "That's the Way (I Like It)", "Ek Haseena Thi" from Karz (1980) was inspired by George Benson's "We as Love (Live)", "Saathiya Tu Mere Sapno Ka Meet Hai" from Insaan (1982) was inspired by Brotherhood of Man's "Angelo" and "Jumma Chumma De De" from Hum (1991) was found to be similar to Mory Kanté's "Tama". Responding to the allegations, Pyarelal said "There was a lot of pressure from actors and producers. For instance, the song "Jumma Chumma" was in the movie Hum just because of the pressure from Amitabh Bachchan. Out of the 500 odd movies that we have done, we must have copied 50 songs because of pressure".
