= Chandrashekhar (actor) =

Indian actor (1922–2021)

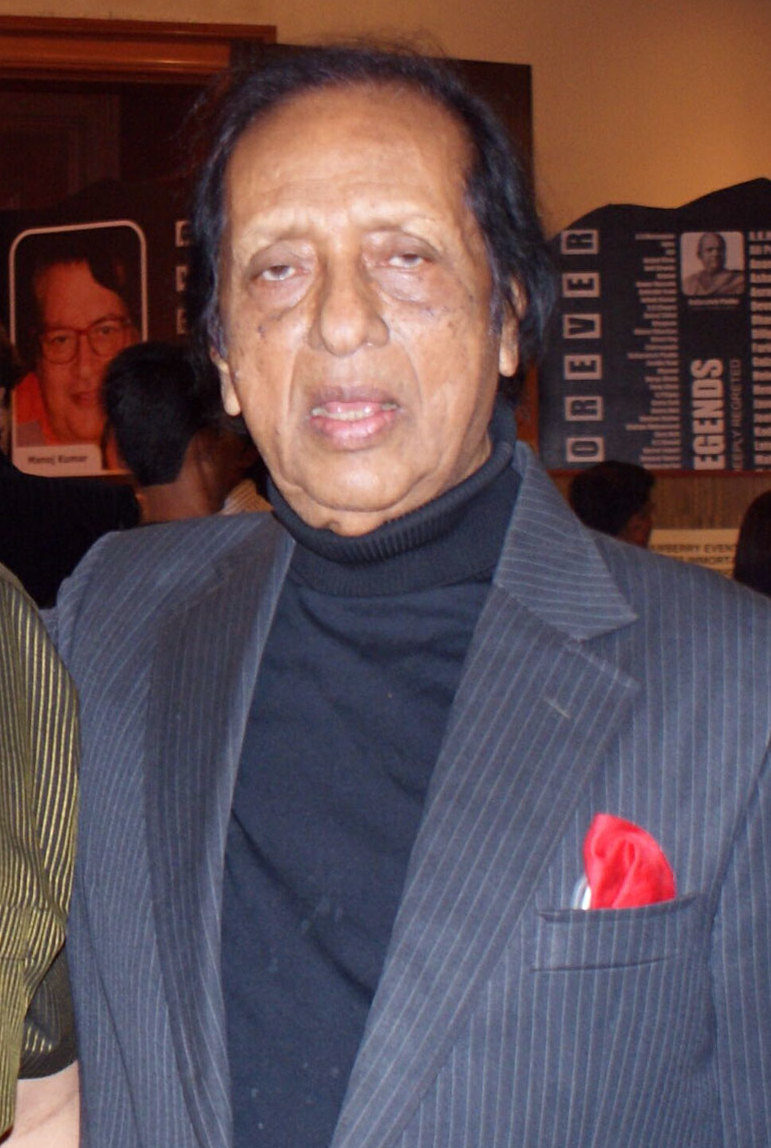
- Born: Chandrashekhar Vaidya; 7 July 1922; Hyderabad, Hyderabad State, British India
- Died: 16 June 2021 (aged 98); Mumbai, Maharashtra, India
- Occupations: Actor; Filmmaker
- Years active: 1950–2000
- Television: Ramayan (1987)

Chandrashekhar Vaidya (7 July 1922 – 16 June 2021), known as Chandrashekhar, was an Indian actor and filmmaker working in the Bollywood film industry. He was best known for playing supporting characters in hindi films and later for playing Arya Sumant in the epic television series Ramayan. He died of age-related illness on 16 June 2021, at the age of 98.

== Early life ==
Chandrashekhar was born in Hyderabad on 7 July 1922. He dropped out of college, and moved to Bombay in the early 1940s. He had a diploma in western dancing from the UK.

== Film career ==
Chandrashekhar, on recommendation from singer Shamshad Begum, got his first job with Shalimar Studios in Pune in 1948. He then received junior artist role in Bebas (1950), with Bharat Bhushan as the lead character. He initially played junior artist roles in films like Nirdoshi (1951), Daag (1952), Farmiash (1953) and Meenar (1954).

He appeared in about 250 films since his appearance in the 1954 film Aurat Teri Yehi Kahani as an actor. His first film as hero was Surang (1953), produced by V. Shantaram. Some of his characters, as the supporting actor which became popular came in films like Gateway of India, Fashion (1957), Barsaat Ki Raat (1960), Baat Ek Raat Ki, Angulimaal (1960), Rustom-E-Baghdad (1963), King Kong (1962) and Jahan Ara (1964).

He also produced, directed, and acted as the lead hero in his hit musical film Cha Cha Cha, which was the first film of Helen in a lead role. Cha Cha Cha is one of the films featured in Avijit Ghosh's book 40 Retakes: Bollywood Classics You May Have Missed. In 1966, he directed and produced his second film Street Singer.

Chandrashekhar was the leading man in films like Surang (1953), Kavi and Mastana (both 1954), Baradari (1955), Kali Topi Lal Rumal (1959), Street Singer, and in a negative role in Basant Bahar. It was after 1968, that Chandrashekar was not getting offers to act in a leading role, and he subsequently moved into character roles. He was regular character actor in directorial ventures of Shakti Samanta and films with Rajesh Khanna as the lead hero, with films like Kati Patang, Ajnabee, Mehbooba and Alag Alag.

From 1971 onwards until 1987, he acted as a character actor in films like Hum Tum Aur Woh, Dharma, Gehri Chaal, Charitraheen, Vardaan, Ranga Khush, Shakti, Shankar Dada, Anpadh, Saajan Bina Suhagan, Karmayogi, The Burning Train, Namak Halaal, Nikaah, Ayaash, Maan Gaye Ustaad, Disco Dancer, Sharaabi, Sansar and Hukumat.

Chandrashekhar decided to work as an assistant director to Gulzar at the age of 50, when he felt he needed to do more in the film industry. He assisted Gulzar in films like Parichay, Koshish, Achanak, Aandhi, Khushboo and Mausam between 1972 and 1976.

He also played the character role of Arya Sumant as Dasharatha's prime minister in Ramanand Sagar's TV series Ramayana at the age of 65.

In late 1988, Chandrashekhar was offered roles as "old man" in-character roles of policemen, fathers or judges in films like Tamacha (1988), Elaan-E-Jung, Mera Pati Sirf Mera Hai, Jawani Zindabad, Gurudev, Humshakal (1992) and Waqt Ka Badshah.

== Other work ==
Chandrashekhar served as President of the Cine Artistes Association (CINTAA) from 1985 to 1996. He served in different capacities as President of the Federation of Western India Cine Employees, All India Film Employees Confederation, trustee of Cine Artistes Welfare Fund of India and Cine Artiste Welfare Trust, vice-president of Indian Film Directors Association, associated as Member with Film Writers Association, Indian Motion Pictures Producers Association.

He retired from the industry in 2000 after appearing in Khauff at the age of 78.

== Personal life ==
Chandrashekhar's son Ashok Shekhar is a known television producer and also runs an events and celeb management company; Chandrashekhar's grandson Shakti Arora is an actor.

== Filmography ==
=== Actor ===
- Bebas (1950)
- Nirdoshi (1951)
- Daag (1952)
- Farmaish (1953)
- Surang (1953)
- Meenar (1954)
- Aurat Teri Yehi Kahani (1954)
- Kavi (1954)
- Mastana (1954)
- Baradari (1955)
- Basant Bahar (1956)
- Gateway of India (1957)
- Fashion (1957)
- Laxmi (1957)
- Kali Topi Lal Rumal (1959)
- Barsaat Ki Raat (1960)
- Angulimaal (1960)
- Baat Ek Raat Ki (1962)
- King Kong (1962)
- Rustom-E-Baghdad (1963)
- Jahan Ara (1964)
- Cha Cha Cha (1964)
- Ayeel Basant Bahar (1965)
- Street Singer (1966)
- Kati Patang (1970)
- Hum Tum Aur Woh (1971)
- Dharma (1973)
- Gehri Chaal (1973)
- Ajnabee (1974)
- Charitraheen (1974)
- Vardaan (1975)
- Ranga Khush (1975)
- Aaj Ka Ye Ghar (1976)
- Mehbooba (1976)
- Shankar Dada (1976)
- Anpadh (1978)
- Saajan Bina Suhagan (1978)
- Karmayogi (1978)
- Beqasoor (1980)
- The Burning Train (1980)
- Maan Gaye Ustaad (1981)
- Dhanwan (1981)
- Khuda Kasam (1981) as Inspector
- Namak Halaal (1982)
- Dial 100 (1982) as Inspector Varma
- Nikaah (1982)
- Ayaash (1982)
- Shakti (1982)
- Disco Dancer (1982)
- Sharaabi (1984)
- Insaaf Main Karoongaa (1985)
- Durgaa (1985)
- Alag Alag (1985)
- Goraa (1987)
- Sansar (1987)
- Insaniyat Ke Dushman (1987)
- Daku Hasina (1987)
- Hukumat (1987)
- Sitapur Ki Geeta (1987)
- Dance Dance (1987)
- Naam O Nishan (1987)
- Watan Ke Rakhwale (1987)
- Awam (1987)+
- Shukriyaa (1988)
- Gharwali Baharwali
- Tamacha (1988)
- Khatron Ke Khiladi (1988)
- Tridev (1989)
- Love Love Love (1989)
- Elaan-E-Jung (1989)
- Kala Bazaar (1989)
- Majboor (1990)
- Ghar Ho To Aisa (1990)
- Mera Pati Sirf Mera Hai (1990)
- Jawani Zindabad (1990)
- Shiva (1990)
- Nachnewale Gaanewale (1991)
- Begunaah (1991)
- Trinetra (1991) as Jailor
- Maa (1991)
- Waqt Ka Badshah (1992)
- Ghazab Tamasha (1992)
- Kisme Kitna Hai Dum (1992) as Ganga Singh
- Humshakal (1992)
- Insaaf Ka Khoon (1993)
- Apaatkaal (1993) as Judge
- Meri Aan (1993)
- Gurudev (1993)
- Pathreela Raasta (1994) as Judge
- Qahar (1997)

=== Producer and director ===
- Cha Cha Cha (1964)
- Street Singer (1966)

=== Assistant director ===
- Parichay (1972)
- Koshish (1972)
- Achanak (1973)
- Aandhi (1975)
- Khushboo (1975)
- Mausam (1975)

=== Television ===
- Ramayana (1987–1988) (as Sumantra, Dasharatha's Prime Minister)
