= Thyagam =

- Theatrical release poster
- Directed by: K. Vijayan
- Dialogue by: A. L. Narayanan
- Story by: Shaktipada Rajguru
- Produced by: K. Balaji
- Starring: Sivaji Ganesan; Lakshmi
- Cinematography: N. Balakrishnan
- Edited by: B. Kanthasamy
- Music by: Ilaiyaraaja
- Production company: Sujatha Cine Arts
- Distributed by: SJS Paradise
- Release date: 4 March 1978
- Country: India
- Language: Tamil

Thyagam (/θjɑːɡəm/ transl. Sacrifice) is a 1978 Indian Tamil-language action drama film directed by K. Vijayan, starring Sivaji Ganesan and Lakshmi. It is a remake of the 1974 Bengali/Hindi bilingual film Amanush. The film revolves around a wealthy man who falls into poverty due to the machinations of his accountant who later has him arrested on false charges. It was released on 4 March 1978 and became one of the highest-grossing Tamil films of the year.

== Plot ==
Raja and Radha are lovers. Raja is a rich man who has now fallen into depths of despair and poverty due to machinations of his accountant. He has taken over the family property after sending Raja to prison under fake rape and murder charges. Radha too has left him. Inspector Prasanth joins duty and strikes an odd friendship with Raja after initial skirmishes. He rehabilitates Raja, who is an engineer, by giving him a civil contract for construction of a bridge. Life seems to turn for the better until the accountant finds out that the inspector is now reinvestigating the fake charges. He attempts to destroy the bridge, damage Raja and Prasanth's name and save himself. Does he succeed or does Raja manage to redeem himself?

== Cast ==
- Sivaji Ganesan as Raja / Rajasekaran
- Lakshmi as Radha
- K. Balaji as Inspector Prasanth
- Major Sundarrajan
- V. K. Ramasamy as the accountant
- M. R. R. Vasu
- Nagesh as the fisherman
- Thengai Srinivasan as the temple priest
- Manorama
- A. Karunanidhi
- Junior Balaiah
- Mukkamala
- Fatafat Jayalaxmi

== Soundtrack ==
The music was scored by Ilaiyaraaja and the lyrics were written by Kannadasan. The song "Thenmalli Poove" is set to Mohanam raga.

Song	Singer	Length
"Nallavarkkellam"	T. M. Soundararajan	4:21
"Thenmalli Poove"	T. M. Soundararajan, S. Janaki	4:03
"Ulagam Verum"	T. M. Soundararajan	4:24
"Varuga Engal"	T. M. Soundararajan, Kausalya, Mohd.Yusuf, M.Vasudevan	5:47
"Vasantha Kaala Kolangal"	S. Janaki	3:43

== Reception ==
Ananda Vikatan gave the film 45 out of 100 marks, primarily praising Ganesan and Lakshmi's performances, the cinematography and the colouring by Prasad Labs. Free India praised the performances of Ganesan and Lakshmi, even though the latter seemed underutilised. The critic also appreciated the cinematography and editing but felt the music was average.
