= Jete Jete Pathe Holo Deri =

1974 song by R. D. Burman

Single by R. D. Burman
- Language: Bengali
- English title: I got delayed while on my way
- Released: 1974
- Length: 3:07
- Label: Saregama
- Composer: R. D. Burman
- Lyricist: Gauriprasanna Mazumder

Lyrical video
- "Jete Jete Pathe Holo" on YouTube

"Jete Jete Pathe Holo Deri" is a Bengali-language non-film modern [adhunik] song by R. D. Burman, written by lyricist Gauriprasanna Mazumder and composed by R. D. Burman. As a non-film song, it was released in 1974 originally with no assigned album. It became a chart-topper Bengali song in the non-film songs category and also one of the most popular songs performed by R. D. Burman.

== Writing and remake ==
The original Bengali song titled "Jete Jete Pathe Holo Deri" was written by Bengali lyricist Gauriprasanna Mazumdar; composed, produced and sung by Rahul Dev Burman (R. D. Burman), and was released as a non-film song without being part of any music album. A Hindi-language remake of the Bengali song, titled "Tere Bina Zindagi Se Koi" was released in 1975, written by Gulzar, composed by R. D. Burman and sung by Kishore Kumar and Lata Mangeshkar, Indian playback singers.

R. D. Burman previously came into contact and worked with lyricist Gulzar in 1972 for the film Parichay, from where they became known as one of the most popular lyricist and composer duos in Bollywood music industry. In 1974, Gulzar heard the song, titled by its opening line as "Jete jete pathe holo deri, tai to paari ni, jete paari ni", released as an annual Puja song in Bengali. Gulzar spoke in an interview that he asked Burman to reserve the song tune for use in a Hindi song which he would write after hearing the original. The next year, the Hindi song "Tere Bina Zindagi Se Koi" was released as a part of the 1975 film Aandhi, also directed by Gulzar. The topic of the Hindi song is defined as "lost love and longing", created from the Bengali's song's tune style and arrangement. There are lines of dialogues present in the song, which R. D. Burman did not like and preferred his songs to not be cut in between.

Aandhi starred actors such as Sanjeev Kumar and Suchitra Sen. It was written by Kamleshwar and directed by Gulzar. The film and its songs, music and performances became classics in the Bollywood film industry. It was banned a few months after its release during the Emergency of 1975 in India, allegedly for being based on the lives of prime minister Indira Gandhi and her husband. Some time later, Gulzar was nominated for a Filmfare award for the lyrics of "Tere Bina Zindagi Se Koi". Although it was written in accordance of the tune and melody of "Jete Jete Pathe Holo Deri", it was regarded to have been a song with "a life of its own".

== Performances ==
Filmmaker Sujoy Ghosh, known for his films like Kahaani, suggested actor Vidya Balan to learn Bengali language. In an interview, Balan said that Ghosh offered her to act in Kahaani two years before her statement. She texted Ghosh to send her Bengali rhymes and songs, which included the film Sanyasi Raja and its song "Kaharaba Noy Dadra Bajao". Afterwards, Balan learned the song "Jete Jete Pathe Holo Deri", for which she asked Ghosh to write and send the lyrics of it in messages to learn about it and Bengali.

Asha Bhosle, the later wife of R. D. Burman sang a cover version of the song as a tribute to Burman, who died in 1994. Genesis, an orchestra based in Puducherry, hosted a live music concert titled "SecSat" in an open ground on October 12, where it was included to be sung in the list of Bengali songs of the concert as a suggestion to the Durga Puja festival celebrated in Bengal. At a function organized by Emphony, R. D. Burman foundation, singer Jolly Mukherjee sang the Bengali song as a tribute to Burman in 2012.
