= 23rd Filmfare Awards =

1976 awards for Hindi cinema

- Date: 1976
- Site: Bombay

Highlights
- Best Film: Deewaar
- Best Actor: Sanjeev Kumar for Aandhi
- Best Actress: Lakshmi for Julie
- Most awards: Deewaar (7)
- Most nominations: Sholay (10)

The 23rd Filmfare Awards for Hindi-language films were held in Bombay on March 30, 1976.

Sholay led the ceremony with 10 nominations, followed by Amanush and Deewaar with 9 nominations each, and with Aandhi and Sanyasi with 7 nominations each.

Deewaar won 7 awards, including Best Film, Best Director (for Yash Chopra) and Best Supporting Actor (for Shashi Kapoor). thus becoming the most-awarded film at the ceremony.

Sholay, considered one of the most successful films of Bollywood, was expected to steam-roll the competition, controversially went home with just 1 win out of its 10 nominations, winning Best Editing (for M. S. Shinde).

Sanjeev Kumar received dual nominations for Best Actor for his performances in Aandhi and Sholay, winning for the former.

Hema Malini received dual nominations for Best Actress for her performances in Khushboo and Sanyasi, but lost to Lakshmi who won the award for Julie, her first and only win in the category.

Pran received dual nominations for Best Supporting Actor for his performances in Do Jhoot and Majboor, but lost to Shashi Kapoor who won the award for Deewaar, his sole acting Filmfare award.

== Main awards ==
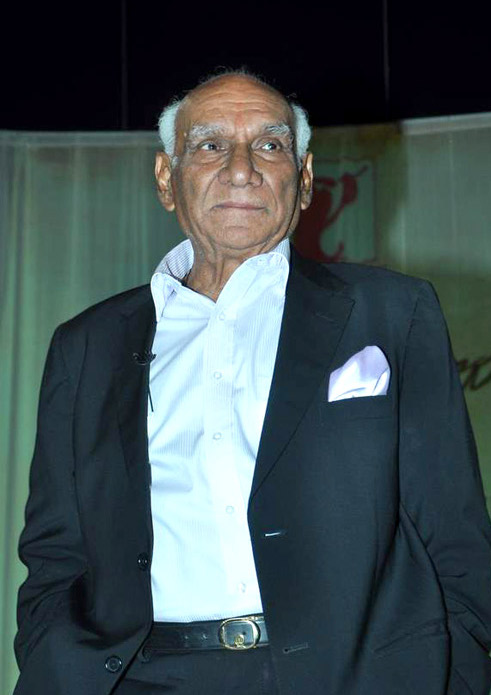
Yash Chopra — Best Director winner for Deewaar

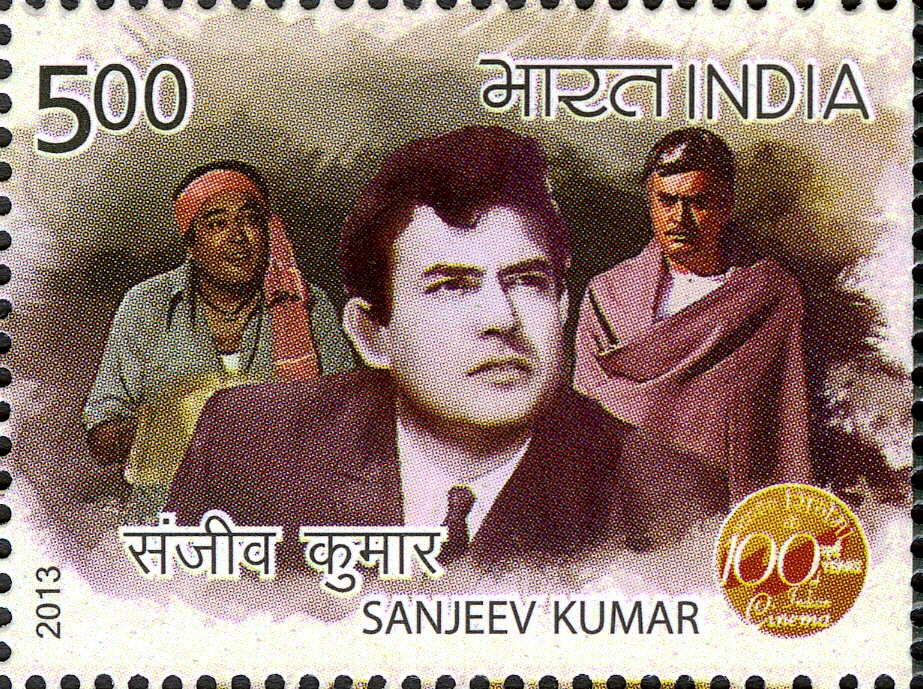
Sanjeev Kumar — Best Actor winner for Aandhi

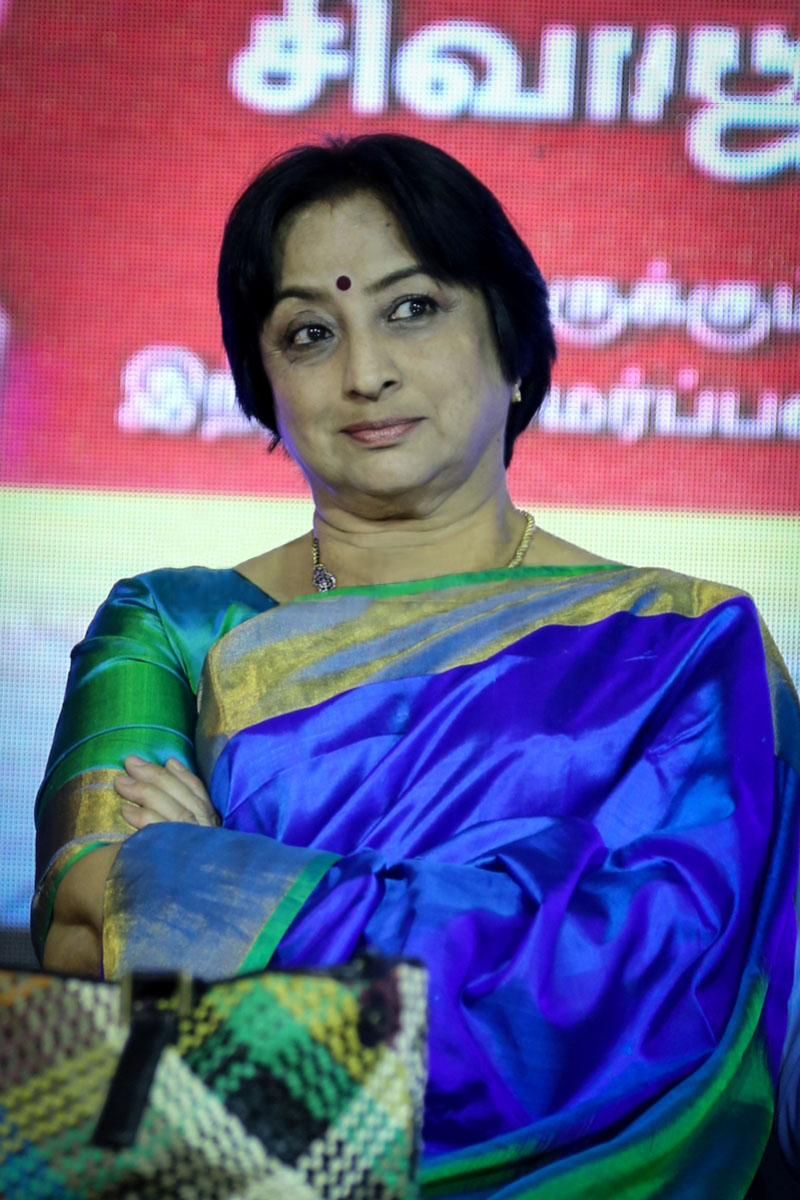
Lakshmi — Best Actress winner for Julie

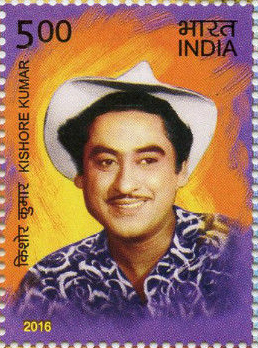
Kishore Kumar — Best Playback singer, Male winner for "Dil Aisa Kisi Ne Mera Toda" (Amanush)

=== Best Film ===
Deewaar

- Aandhi
- Amanush
- Sanyasi
- Sholay

=== Best Director ===
Yash Chopra – Deewaar

- Gulzar – Aandhi
- Ramesh Sippy – Sholay
- Shakti Samanta – Amanush
- Sohanlal Kanwar – Sanyasi

=== Best Actor ===
Sanjeev Kumar – Aandhi

- Amitabh Bachchan – Deewaar
- Manoj Kumar – Sanyasi
- Sanjeev Kumar – Sholay
- Uttam Kumar – Amanush

=== Best Actress ===
Lakshmi – Julie

- Hema Malini – Khushboo
- Hema Malini – Sanyasi
- Jaya Bachchan – Mili
- Suchitra Sen – Aandhi

=== Best Supporting Actor ===
Shashi Kapoor – Deewaar

- Amjad Khan – Sholay
- Pran – Do Jhoot
- Pran – Majboor
- Utpal Dutt – Amanush

=== Best Supporting Actress ===
Nadira – Julie

- Aruna Irani – Do Jhoot
- Farida Jalal – Majboor
- Nirupa Roy – Deewaar
- Prema Narayan – Amanush

=== Best Comic Actor ===
Deven Verma – Chori Mera Kaam

- Asrani – Rafoo Chakkar
- Asrani – Sholay
- Keshto Mukherjee – Kala Sona
- Mehmood – Qaid

=== Best Story ===
Deewaar – Salim–Javed

- Aandhi – Kamleshwar
- Amanush – Shakti Prada Rajguru
- Nishant – Vijay Tendulkar
- Sholay – Salim–Javed

=== Best Screenplay ===
Deewaar – Salim–Javed

=== Best Dialogue ===
Deewaar – Salim–Javed

=== Best Music Director ===
Julie – Rajesh Roshan

- Dulhan – Laxmikant–Pyarelal
- Khel Khel Mein – R. D. Burman
- Sanyasi – Shankar–Jaikishan
- Sholay – R. D. Burman

=== Best Lyricist ===
Amanush – Indeevar for Dil Aisa Kisi Ne Mera Toda

- Aandhi – Gulzar for Tere Bina Zindagi Se
- Dulhan – Anand Bakshi for Chitti Zaroor Aayegi
- Sanyasi – Visveshwara Sharma for Chal Sanyasi
- Sholay – Anand Bakshi for Mehbooba Mehbooba

=== Best Playback Singer, Male ===
Amanush – Kishore Kumar for Dil Aisa Kisi Ne Mera Toda

- Faraar – Kishore Kumar for Main Pyaasa Tu Saawan
- Khushboo – Kishore Kumar for O Maajhi Re
- Sanyasi – Manna Dey for Kya Mar Sakegi
- Sholay – R. D. Burman for Mehbooba Mehbooba

=== Best Playback Singer, Female ===
Sankalp – Sulakshna Pandit for Tu Hi Sagar Hai

- Amanush – Asha Bhosle for Kal Ke Apne
- Jai Santoshi Maa – Usha Mangeshkar for Main To Aarti
- Julie – Preeti Sagar for My Heart Is Beating
- Khel Khel Mein – Asha Bhosle for Sapna Mera Toot Gaya

=== Best Art Direction ===
Do Jhoot – Bansi Chandragupta

=== Best Cinematography ===
Dharmatma – Kamal Bose

=== Best Editing ===
Sholay – M. S. Shinde

=== Best Sound ===
Deewaar – M. A. Shaikh

== Critics' awards ==
=== Best Film ===
Aandhi

=== Best Documentary ===
Sarojini Naidu

=== Special Award ===
Preeti Sagar for "My Heart Is Beating" in Julie

== Biggest Winners ==
- Deewaar – 7/9
- Julie – 3/4
- Amanush – 2/9
- Aandhi – 2/7
- Sholay – 1/10
- Sanyasi – 0/7

== See also ==
- 25th Filmfare Awards
- 24th Filmfare Awards
- Filmfare Awards
