= Sanyasi (1975 film) =

- Poster
- Directed by: Sohanlal Kanwar
- Screenplay by: Ram Kelkar
- Story by: Ram Kelkar
- Produced by: Sohanlal Kanwar
- Starring: Manoj Kumar; Hema Malini; Premnath; Prem Chopra
- Cinematography: Radhu Karmakar
- Edited by: Nand Kumar
- Music by: Shankar–Jaikishan
- Production company: Filmnagar
- Distributed by: Filmnagar
- Release date: 17 October 1975
- Running time: 160 mins
- Country: India
- Language: Hindi

Sanyasi (transl. Hermit) is a 1975 Hindi film directed by Sohanlal Kanwar, starring Manoj Kumar and Hema Malini as leads. The film is noted for its music by Shankar Jaikishan. The film was the third highest-grossing film of the year.

== Plot ==
Renukadevi is widowed and the mother of a son named Ram. Her husband had indulged in all possible vices, and died. Her father-in-law, Rai, does not want Ram to repeat his father's mistakes, and teaches him all the positive values of the Hindu religion, in particular the contents of the Bhagavad Gita. As a result, Ram refrains from all known vices, is an expert in yogic exercises, decides to live the life of a celibate, and refuses to marry anyone. When Rai dies, Renuka asks Ram to fulfill his grandfather's last wishes, one of which was to get married. She even arranges his introduction to Aarti, an attractive young woman. But Ram is convinced that marriage is not for him. Renuka is overjoyed when her estranged brother, Gopinath, and his son, Rakesh return from abroad. With their help she hopes to get Ram married with Aarti. Then things get complicated when Rakesh falls in love with Aarti. Ram leaves town to attend to business, and circumstances propel Renuka to will her entire estate to Rakesh and change his name to Bharat, with the blessings of a renowned saint named Ishwar Baba. After this ceremony, the people around Renuka start showing their true colors, and after an open-palmed stinging slap from Aarti, Renuka realizes that her place in this house is now worse than that of a lowly servant. Renuka now finds out that Aarti, Gopinath, and Rakesh are not who they claim to be.

== Cast ==
- Manoj Kumar ... Ram Rai
- Hema Malini ... Aarti/Champa
- Prem Nath ... Ishwar Baba/Mangal Singh
- Prem Chopra ... Banwari
- Aruna Irani ... Radhika
- Pran ... Shanti Baba 'Guruji'
- Indrani Mukherjee ... Devotee
- Kamini Kaushal ... Champa's Mother
- Sulochana ... Renuka Devi
- Chandra Shekhar ... Police Inspector Shekhar
- Sailesh Kumar ... Ranjeet (as Shailesh Kumar)
- Raj Mehra ... Girdhari
- Hari Shivdasani ... Family Advocate
- Murad ... Seth Hiralal
- Brahm Bhardwaj ... Rai (as Bram Bhradwaj)
- V. Gopal ... Mangal Mistry's Man
- C.S. Dubey ... Munimji
- Rajpal
- Yunus Parvez ... Hakim Rahim Khan (as Yunus Parveez)
- Keshav Rana ... Mangal Mistry's Man
- Dhumal ... Dinu - House Servant
- Kuljeet
- Kamaldeep ... Mangal Mistry's Man (as Kamal Deep)
- Narbada Shankar
- Tiger sonnaiii
- Shera
- Romeo
- G.A. Sheikh
- Dinesh Hingoo ... Roop Chand
- Bihari
- Harbans Darshan M. Arora ... Man who received donations (as Darshan Arora)
- Sabina
- Sheela ... (as Sheila)
- Madhup Sharma
- Krishna Kumar
- Kumari Naaz ... Savitri (uncredited)
- Nazima ... Aarti (uncredited)
- Helen ... 1st Dancer (song "Tu Mera Din Hai")
- Jayshree T. ... 3rd Dancer (song "Tu Mera Din Hai")
- Arpana Choudhary ... 2nd Dancer (song "Tu Mera Din Hai") (as Aparna Chowdhary)

== Awards ==
23rd Filmfare Awards:

Nominated

- Best Film – Sohanlal Kanwar
- Best Director – Sohanlal Kanwar
- Best Actor – Manoj Kumar
- Best Actress – Hema Malini
- Best Music Director – Shankar–Jaikishan
- Best Lyricist – Visveshwara Sharma for "Chal Sanyasi"
- Best Male Playback Singer – Manna Dey for "Kya Maar Sakegi"

== Soundtrack ==
Music Director for all songs: Shankar-Jaikishan

#	Title	Singer(s)	Lyrics
1	"Chal Sanyasi Mandir Mein"	Lata Mangeshkar, Mukesh	Vishweshwar Sharma
2	"Sun Baal Bramhachari"	Lata Mangeshkar, Mukesh	Verma Malik
3	"Bali Umariya Bhajan Karoon Kaise"	Lata Mangeshkar, Mukesh	Vitalbhai Patel
4	"Sham-E-Furqat Ka Dhal Gaya Saya"	Lata Mangeshkar, Premnath	Hasrat Jaipuri
5	"Choron Ka Maal Chor Kha Gaya"	Mukesh, Suman Kalyanpur	M. G. Hashmat
6	"Jaise Mera Roop Rangila"	Lata Mangeshkar	Vishweshwar Sharma
7	"Yeh Hai Geeta Ka Gyan"	Lata Mangeshkar, Mukesh	M. G. Hashmat
8	"Kya Maar Sakegi Maut Use"	Manna Dey	Indeevar
