= Aaj Ka Ye Ghar =

- Directed by: Surendra Shailaj
- Written by: B. K. Adarsh
- Release date: 1976
- Country: India
- Language: Hindi

Aaj Ka Ye Ghar is a 1976 Bollywood film directed by Surendra Shailaj. The film stars Helen.

== Cast ==
- Shriram Lagoo - Sajjan
- Jaymala
- Romesh Sharma - Vijay
- Helen - Miss Ruhi
- A. K. Hangal - Dinanath
- Lalita Pawar - Mrs. Shanti Dinanath
- Jalal Agha - Nutan Chandra
- Madan Puri - Sajjan's Father-in-law
- I. S. Johar - Painter
- Chandrashekhar - Malik, Sajjan's Boss
- Ramesh Deo - Deshpande
- Master Tito - Pankaj
- Duggal - House Servant
- Navprith Komal - Baby Mona
- Jagirdar
- A. U. Khatri

== Crew ==
- Director - Surendra Shailaj
- Screenplay - B. K. Adarsh
- Dialogue - M. G. Hashmat, Surendra Shailaj
- Producer - Jaymala
- Editor - Ravikumar Patankar
- Cinematographer - Surendra Sinha
- Art Director - Roshan
- Music Director - Anil Mohile, Arun Paudwal
- Lyricist - M. G. Hashmat
- Playback Singers - Kishore Kumar, Anuradha Paudwal, Adolf

== Music ==
Song title	Singers	Time
"Baar Baar Ansuon Ne"	Kishore Kumar	6:16
"Baar Baar Ansuon Ne v2"	Kishore Kumar	6:16
"Bichhu Ban Raaton Mein"	Anuradha Paudwal	3:20
"Come On Baby Lets Dance"	Anuradha Paudwal, Adolf	3:17
