= Do Jhoot =

- Directed by: Jitu Thakar
- Starring: Vinod Mehra; Moushumi Chatterjee; Aruna Irani; Pran
- Music by: Shankar–Jaikishan
- Release date: 1975
- Running time: 133 min
- Country: India
- Language: Hindi

Do Jhoot is a 1975 Bollywood romance film directed by Jitu Thakar. The film stars Vinod Mehra and Moushumi Chatterjee in lead roles.

== Cast ==
- Vinod Mehra as Sanjay
- Moushumi Chatterjee as Lajwanti / Vandana
- Aruna Irani as Rekha
- Ajit as Nathulal
- Kamini Kaushal as Lalita / Usha
- Pran as Chaudhary Pratap Rai
- Prem Chopra as Shailesh

== Awards ==
23rd Filmfare Awards:

Won

- Best Art Direction – Bansi Chandragupta

Nominated

- Best Supporting Actor – Pran
- Best Supporting Actress – Aruna Irani

== Soundtrack ==
#	Title	Singer(s)	Lyricist(s)
1	"Chhatri Na Khol Ud Jayegi"	Kishore Kumar, Usha Mangeshkar	M. G. Hashmat
2	"Beesvin Sadi Ki Hoon Main Bala"	Lata Mangeshkar, Usha Mangeshkar	M. G. Hashmat
3	"Chalo Bhool Jayen"	Kishore Kumar, Lata Mangeshkar	Vitthalbhai Patel
4	"Do Jhoot Jiye Ek Sach Ke Liye" (Happy and Sad Versions)	Lata Mangeshkar	Vishweshwar Sharma
5	"Mohabbat Ne Aey Dil" (Qawwali)	Mahendra Kapoor, Manna Dey, Usha Mangeshkar	M. G. Hashmat
6	"Sharabi Kahta Hai Mujhko"	Mohammed Rafi, Nitin Mukesh, Lata Mangeshkar	Verma Malik
