= Badnam Basti =

1971 Indian neorealistic drama film by Prem Kapoor

- Poster of the film
- Directed by: Prem Kapoor
- Written by: Kamleshwar
- Based on: Badnam Basti by Kamleshwar
- Produced by: Film Finance Corporation
- Starring: Nitin Sethi, Amar Kakkad and Nandita Thakur
- Cinematography: RM Rao
- Edited by: Hrishikesh Mukherjee, Prem Kapoor
- Music by: Vijay Raghav Rao
- Release date: 1971
- Running time: 83 minutes
- Country: India
- Language: Hindi
- Budget: ₹ 250,000

Badnam Basti (English: Infamous Neighbourhood) is a 1971 Bollywood drama film directed by Prem Kapoor and adapted from an eponymous novel by Hindi novelist Kamleshwar. Starring Nitin Sethi, Amar Kakkad, and Nandita Thakur, it is often described as India's first gay film. The film was thought to have been lost for 40 years, but a print was found in 2019.

== Plot ==
Set in Mainpuri, Uttar Pradesh, Badnam Basti tells the story of Sarnam Singh, a bus driver who is also a bandit. Sarnam saves Bansuri from being raped by another bandit. Bansuri falls in love with him, but he is jailed for a petty crime. Upon release, Sarnam searches for Bansuri but does not find her. He then meets Shivraj, who works in a temple, and hires him as a cleaner in the bus. The two become physically and emotionally intimate. Sarnam again encounters Bansuri, who is now living with Sarnam's crony, Rangile, who won her at an auction in a village mela. Bansuri desires to return to Sarnam, but he is torn by his longing for Bansuri and his love for Shivraj. Shivraj, however, goes on to marry Kamala. Rangile, who is a police informant, is convicted and jailed for duplicity in legal matters. As the film ends, Sarnam takes Bansuri and her newborn to his home.

== Cast ==
- Nitin Sethi as Sarnam Singh
- Nandita Thakur as Bansuri
- Amar Kakkad as Shivraj
- Nandlal Sharma

== Production ==
The film is based on Ek Sadak Sattavan Galiyan (A Street with 57 Lanes), the debut novel of the Hindi writer Kamleshwar Prasad Saxena which was originally titled Badnam Basti and serialized in the Hindi journal Hans in 1956 and published as a novel in 1957.

Badnam Basti was produced by the Film Finance Corporation on a budget of ₹250,000. It was shot in a four-week period at Mainpuri. The theme of homosexual interest between the two male characters caused Kamaleshwar's novel to attract controversy; Prem Kapoor had to excise scenes from the novel and make their relationship only suggestive in order to receive clearance by the film censorship board.

Although it is labelled as India's first gay film, Badnam Basti neither explicitly depicts nor identifies the male characters as gay. They are bisexual rather than gay, and their relationship is secondary to their heterosexual relationships.

== Songs ==
The music for Badnam Basti was composed by Vijaya Raghava Rao and Ustad Ghulam Mustafa Khan. Khan, who previously worked with Rao in Bhuvan Shome, sang "Sajna Kaahe Nahi Aaye" for the film. Lyrics were by Virendra Mishra and Harivansh Rai Bachchan; Bachchan recites the poem "Mele Mein Khoi Gujariya" in the film. Rao and Satish Bhutani also sang in the film. The sound recording was done by Narinder Singh.

Following is the list of songs in Badnam Basti:

No.	Title	Singer	Length
1.	"Sajna Kahe Nahi Aaye"	Ghulam Mustafa Khan
2.	"Akela Taaro Bhara Mela"	Satish Bhutani
3.	"Godaniya Gudwaye Le"	Vijay Raghav Rao
4.	"Mele Me Khoi Gujarriya"	Harivansh Rai Bachchan
5.	"Sun Lo Katha Sita Ki"	Vijay Raghav Rao

== Release and reception ==
The film was released with an A certificate from the Central Board of Film Certification. It received mixed reviews. The Times of India called it "a welcome step forward in the direction of 'new cinema' in India". The Economic Times noted that "Badnam Basti presents a true picture of reality". However, a review by Indian magazine Link penned "no film at all – its technical gimmicks are totally out of rhythm with the insipid directorial conception". Rajika Kirpalani in his book Another Time, Another Place wrote: "little more interesting than the hotchpotch that passes for films generally", and that it "sustains its interest merely because of Nitin Sethi, who truly infuses his character with hardy, virile, rural verve". Sethi received praise from The Illustrated Weekly of India, which commented that "Sarnam's loneliness has been projected superbly by Prem Kapoor. It is hard to imagine anyone but Nitin Sethi in the role".

== Re-release and lost film status ==
Originally edited by Hrishikesh Mukherjee, the film did not do well at the box office. It was re-edited by Kapoor and re-released in 1978 with a U certificate, but was a commercial failure again. The film was thereafter thought to be lost with no prints available in India, but re-emerged in 2019 when a print was located in the archives of the Arsenal Institute for Film and Video Art, Berlin. It has since been digitized and was screened by the Block Museum of Art in May 2020 and at the Kashish film festival, Mumbai.
