= Rustom-E-Baghdad =

- Directed by: B.J. Patel
- Written by: K. B. Pathak
- Starring: Dara Singh; Chandrashekhar
- Music by: Datta Naik
- Production company: Hanna Films
- Release date: 1963
- Country: India
- Language: Hindi

Rustom-E-Baghdad is a 1963 Bollywood drama film directed by B.J. Patel.

== Cast ==
- Dara Singh
- Chandrashekhar
- Vijaya Chowdhury
- Shakila Bano Bhopali
- Paulson
- Devichand
- Rajan Kapoor

== Soundtrack ==
All songs were written by Asad Bhopali.

No.	Title	Singer(s)
1	"Chand Jaisa Badan Phool Sa Pehran"	Mohammed Rafi
2	"Masha Allah Ye Jawani"	Usha Mangeshkar, Kamal Barot
3	"Chal Chal Chal Jhoom Ke Chal"	Mohammed Rafi
4	"Chehra Lal Lal Hai Badli Hui Chal Hai"	Asha Bhosle
5	"Phool Khilana Chhod De"	Mahendra Kapoor
6	"Yeh Baat Nahin Hai, Kahen Ki Hum"	Asha Bhosle
