= Mastana (1954 film) =

- Starring: Motilal; Mukri; Chandrashekhar
- Music by: Madan Mohan
- Release date: 1954

Mastana is a 1954 Hindi film, starring Motilal in lead role.

== Soundtrack ==
Song	Singer
"Tiki Chauki Panji Chhakki (Naache More Angana Me)"	Kishore Kumar, Shamshad Begum, Mohammed Rafi
"Kanwaro Ka Bhi Duniya Me Khuda Hota To Kya Hota"	Kishore Kumar, Shamshad Begum
"Mat Bhool Are Insaan Teri Neki"	Mohammed Rafi
"Duniya Ke Sare Ghamo Se Begana Ho Main Hu Mastana"	Mohammed Rafi
"Jhoom Jhoom Ke Do Diwane Gate Jaye Gali Gali"	Mohammed Rafi, Laxmi Shankar
"Raja Ka Hathi Le Le, Gudiya Ka Sathi Le Le"	Asha Bhosle, Mohammed Rafi
"Ro Ro Ke Yaad Kare"	Mohammed Rafi, Asha Bhosle
