= Aandhi =

1975 film by Gulzar

- Film poster
- Directed by: Gulzar
- Written by: Kamleshwar
- Screenplay by: Gulzar; Bhushan Banmali
- Produced by: J. Om Prakash; Gulzar
- Starring: Sanjeev Kumar; Suchitra Sen
- Cinematography: K Vaikunth
- Edited by: Waman Bhonsle; Gurudutt Shirali
- Music by: R.D. Burman; Gulzar(lyricist)
- Production companies: Mehboob Studio; Natraj Studio
- Release date: 14 February 1975 (India)
- Running time: 133 minutes
- Country: India
- Language: Hindi

Aandhi (transl. 'Storm') is a 1975 Indian political drama film starring Sanjeev Kumar and Suchitra Sen, and directed by Gulzar. At the time it was alleged that the film was based on the life of the then-Prime Minister Indira Gandhi and her relationship with her estranged husband, but in reality, only the look was inspired by the politician Pratibha Patil and Indira Gandhi. The story is based on a chance meeting of an estranged couple after several years, when wife Aarti Devi, now a leading politician happens to stay in the hotel run by her husband during an election campaign. The movie is noted for its songs composed by Rahul Dev Burman, written by Gulzar and sung by Kishore Kumar and Lata Mangeshkar.

Suchitra Sen, the noted actress from Bengali cinema, who also worked in a few Hindi films, played the lead role of Aarti Devi.

The movie was not allowed a full proper release when Gandhi was in power. The film was banned during the national emergency of 1975 a few months after its release. This film was banned on the alleged grounds of violation of the Model Election Code of Conduct, claiming it can cause damage to the reputation of the Congress party. So Election Commission stopped the film from releasing. The ban got further added with the declaration of National Emergency. The ban immediately made the film a national topic. After her defeat in the 1977 national elections, the ruling Janata Party cleared it and had it premiered on the state-run television channel. It proved to be an important film in the career of Sen, and also her last Hindi film, as she retired from films altogether in 1978. At the 23rd Filmfare Awards, she was nominated for Filmfare Award for Best Actress, while Sanjeev Kumar won the Filmfare Award for Best Actor. The film itself won the Filmfare Award for Best Film (Critics).

== Summary ==
J.K. (played by Sanjeev Kumar) is a Hotel manager. One day he gallantly comes to the rescue of a politician's drunk daughter, Aarti (Suchitra Sen). Aarti falls in love with J.K. and both get married in a small ceremony. After few years, the married couple face many differences due to which they decide to separate. Years later, J.K. and Aarti meet again when she is an established politician. Despite the separation, both of them feel the closeness but fearing that her name might be tarnished and her career might be jeopardised, Aarti does not want to step forward. But at last when the opposite party holds a rally to defame Aarti Devi and insult her, She reaches there and explains to the public and voters that she left her husband and family to serve the people of this country. People believe her and are really impressed by her speech and sacrifice. J.K. also reaches there and supports her, she is very happy and leaves the spot, declaring that she would go back to home and leave politics. But J.K. then says that he wants her to be happy and succeed in whatever aspect she wants to. She fights the election and wins it. In the end, J.K. accepts the differences between him and Aarti and drops her to the helicopter that takes her away from the hotel.

== Cast ==
- Sanjeev Kumar as J. K.
- Suchitra Sen as Aarti Bose aka Aarti Devi
- Om Shivpuri as Chandrasen
- Manmohan as S. K. Agarwal
- A. K. Hangal as Brinda Kaka
- Kamaldeep as Chowdhary
- C. S. Dubey as Gurusaran
- Om Prakash as Lallu Lal, Campaign Manager
- Rehman as K. Bose
- Master Bittoo as Aarti's daughter Manu

== Production ==
=== Development ===
Gulzar said the film had no semblance with the personal life of then Prime Minister, Indira Gandhi. He wanted to make film about modern Indian politician, and so he modelled the character on Indira Gandhi and to some extent on noted parliamentarian from Bihar, Pratibha Patil.

=== Script ===
An early version of the film's story was written by veteran screenwriter Sachin Bhowmick, however it did not go well with Gulzar. He had an idea of an estranged couple meeting in a hotel after years, and started developing it. Hindi writer Kamleshwar joined as the writing crew, as the film started shooting. He later went on to write a full-fledged novel, Kali Aandhi (Black Storm), which is quite different from the film. Subsequently, the film was written simultaneously along with another Gulzar film, Mausam (1975), which was also written by Bhushan Banmali and Gulzar. Along with Khushboo, Aandhi also released in the same year; 1975 proving to be the most prolific for director-screenwriter Gulzar's career.

=== Casting ===
The lead role of Aarti Devi was offered to actress Vyjayanthimala, who refused as she was fazed by physical resemblance of her character with Indira Gandhi. Later in 2011, she recounted Aandhi as one of few films she regretted not doing besides Mr and Mrs 55 (1955) by Guru Dutt and Bandini (1963) by Bimal Roy, "I admired Indiraji (Gandhi) so much so that I got cold feet when the role was offered to me."

In the early 1960s, director Gulzar had approached Suchitra Sen, with screenplay for a film to be produced by Sohanlal Kanwar, however when she suggested some changes which Gulzar didn't agree upon, the film never got made. For film Aandhi producer J. Om Prakash insisted upon Gulzar to approach Sen again and actor Sanjeev Kumar was also keen on working with Sen. This time when the new script was done, Gulzar went to meet her in Kolkata, she agreed without any script issues, resulting in a casting coup. In fact, Sen now promised Gulzar to not suggest any changes, and she stuck to her promise all through the filming. For the role Aarti Devi's estranged husband Sanjeev Kumar was already cast, who had previously worked in Gulzar's Koshish (1973), again as an older man. Kumar, one of the finest actors of his generation, went on to collaborate with Gulzar in numerous films, like Mausam (1975), Angoor (1981) and Namkeen (1982).

=== Filming ===
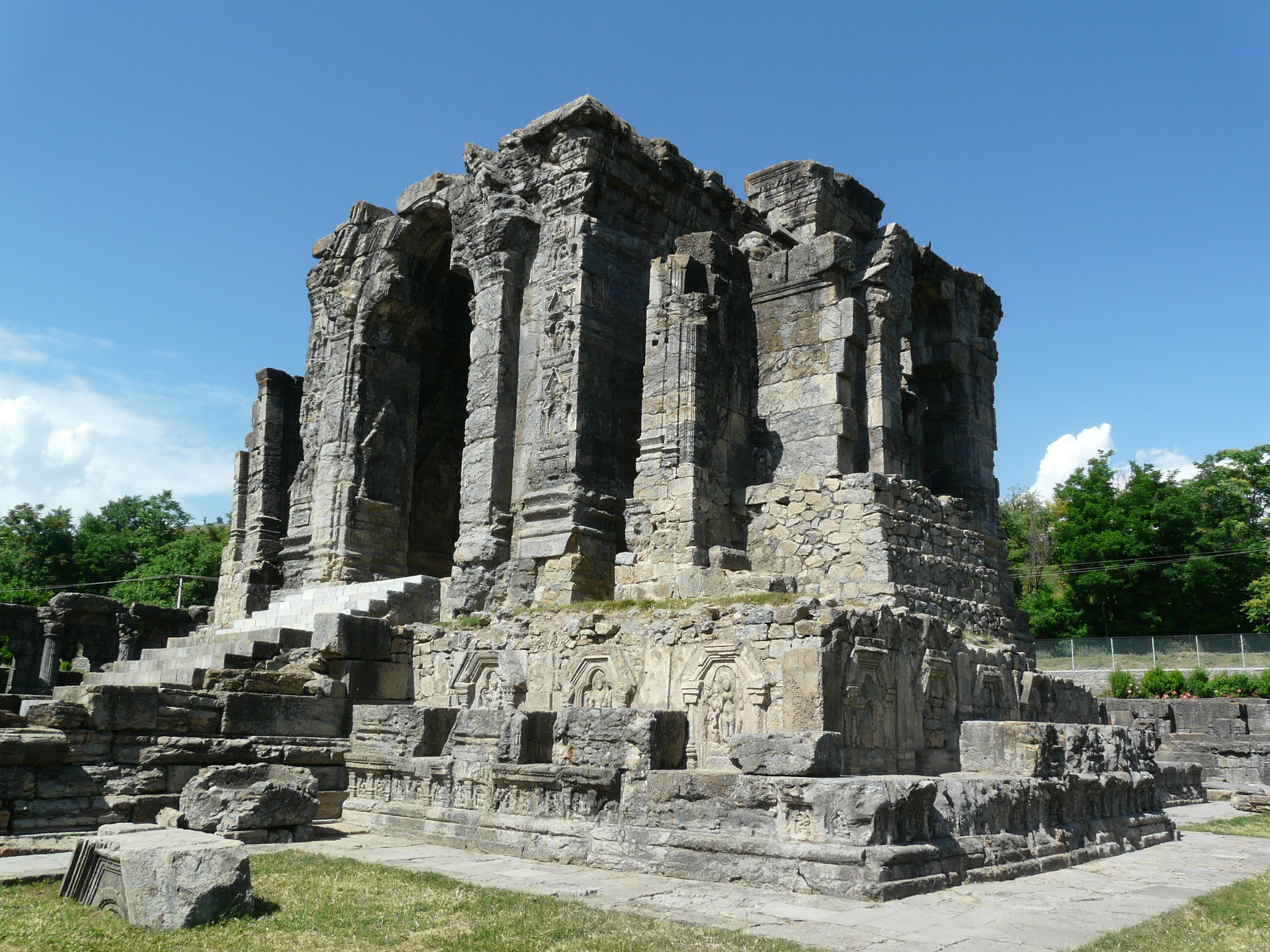
"Tere Bina Zindagi Se" was shot at Martand Sun Temple ruins

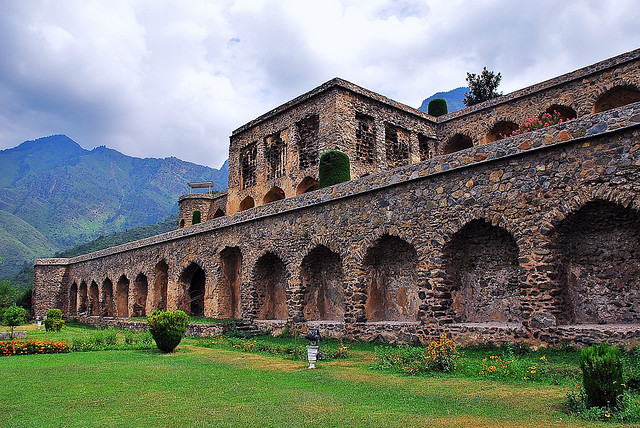
"Tum Aa Gaye Ho" was shot around Pari Mahal gardens, Srinagar.

Like most of Gulzar's films, including Mausam and Ijaazat, the narrative of Aandhi also unfolds through various flashbacks. The film was almost shot together with Mausam, with Sanjeev Kumar playing the lead of an old man in both the films. Though Aandhi was released first, it ran into political controversy and portions of it has to be reshot, meanwhile Mausam was completed and released. The songs of the film were shot at various locations in Jammu and Kashmir state, like "Tum Aa Gaye Ho" was shot around Pari Mahal gardens in Srinagar, the classic "Tere Bina Zindagi Se" at the ruined 7th-8th century Martand Sun Temple, near Anantnag, while "Is Mod Se Jaate Hai" was shot at Pahalgam. Most of the songs have architectural ruins as a backdrop, depicting brokenness. Gulzar's family, wife Raakhee and daughter Meghna Gulzar accompanied him on the shooting in Kashmir, however upon their return, Rakhee and Gulzar separated.

== Themes and influences ==
In her memoir, daughter Meghna mentioned that Gulzar's wife Rakhee had once said to him, "Agar aap shayar na hote, to bade hi ordinary hote" (If you weren't a poet, you would have been very ordinary), this line was paraphrased and spoken by Aarti Devi to her husband in the film. The film looks at the life of a career-minded woman in the political arena, which is largely dominated by men. Aarti inherits the legacy of her ambitious politician father, and comes in conflict with her role as dutiful wife. Soon she has to make choices to resolve the conflicts, and part ways with her husband, giving career rather duty as a daughter precedence over her personal life. When they meet again after nine years of separation, the dominating personality created under influence of her father has mellow and wisdom risen and she sees what she has missed. Yet she finds herself at a choice point once again, should she give up her political career or settle for matrimonial life. Aandhi takes on a feminist theme, also taken up in Ray's Mahanagar before, as it questions the price women often have to pay for political aspirations or career aspiration for that matter, when her unambitious hotel manager husband refuses to support.

It also satirizes the political opportunism in Indian democracy, where politicians visit the common man only every five years, at the time of elections. Through the lines of the song "Salaam kijiye aali janaab aaye hain, ye paanch saalon ka dene hisaab aaye hain. (Bow to the masters.. They have come after five years...).

== Awards and nominations ==
At the 23rd Filmfare Awards held in 1976, the film was nominated in 7 categories, winning 2 awards.

Award	Category	Recipient	Result
23rd Filmfare Awards	Best Actor	Sanjeev Kumar	Won
23rd Filmfare Awards	Best Film (Critics)	Gulzar	Won
23rd Filmfare Awards	Best Film	J. Om Prakash	Nominated
23rd Filmfare Awards	Best Director	Gulzar	Nominated
23rd Filmfare Awards	Best Actress	Suchitra Sen	Nominated
23rd Filmfare Awards	Best Lyricist	Gulzar for "Tere Bina Zindagi Se Koi"	Nominated
23rd Filmfare Awards	Best Story	Kamleshwar	Nominated

== Soundtrack ==
Aandhi: The Original Motion Picture Soundtrack

Soundtrack album by Rahul Dev Burman
- Released: 1975
- Label: His Master's Voice

The music of this film was composed by Rahul Dev Burman with lyrics by Gulzar. Director-lyricist Gulzar first worked with Burman or Pancham as he commonly known as in Parichay (1972), giving popular songs like "Beeti Na Bitai Raina" and "Musafir Hoon Yaaro". In the following years their team gradually developed in the preceding years, eventually reaching a flourish in 1975 with two important film scores in the same year, Aandhi and Khushboo. Previously Gulzar had like the use of pure notes (shuddha swara) in "Raina Beete Jai" from Amar Prem (1972) by Burman, a treatment which was used in the film's title music. The Lata Mangeshkar-Kishore Kumar duet "Is Mod Se Jaate Hain" extended the major scale usage with an added sharp (Teevra Madhyam) and reminiscence of Raga Yaman. Even the interludes included Indian classical instruments, like flute played by Hariprasad Chaurasia, sarod by Zarin Daruwala (Sharma) and sitar by Jairam Acharya, aided by a violin ensemble. The tune of "Tere Bina.." another Lata Mangeshkar-Kishore Kumar duet, was originally created as Durga Puja song, "Jete Jete Pathe Holo Deri" in Bengali, which Gulzar liked and wrote lyrics around the tune.

Song	Singer(s)	Time	Notes
"Tere Bina Zindagi Se"	Kishore Kumar & Lata Mangeshkar	5:55	Picturised on Sanjeev Kumar and Suchitra Sen
"Tum Aa Gaye Ho Noor Aa Gaya"	Kishore Kumar & Lata Mangeshkar	4:15	Picturised on Sanjeev Kumar and Suchitra Sen
"Is Mod Se Jate Hain"	Kishore Kumar & Lata Mangeshkar	5:00	Picturised on Sanjeev Kumar and Suchitra Sen; raga Kalyan
"Salam Kijiye"	Mohammed Rafi, Amit Kumar and Bhupinder Singh	6:55	Ensemble cast
Title Music Instrumental	R.D. Burman	2:35	

Tere Bina Zindagi Se Koi sample music
A 1 minute 28 seconds sample of one of the most popular songs of the film "Tere Bina Zindagi Se Koi".

=== Reception ===
The RD-Gulzar team created for the film, songs which were both acclaimed and also popular songs of the decade. Songs like "Tere Bina Zindagi", "Tum Aa Gaye Ho" and "Is Mod Se Jate Hain" are considered eternal classics in Indian cinema. Songs "Tere Bina Zindagi Se" and "Is Mod Se Jate Hain" were listed 5th and 14th respectively on Binaca Geetmala annual list 1975. As per Planet Bollywood listings, "Tere Bina Zindagi Se" stands number 2 amongst top 10 Bollywood songs of the 1970s.

== Release, ban and re-release ==
The film released in February 1975 amidst controversy, as rumours abound that it was based on the life of Prime Minister Indira Gandhi. Some of film's posters also hyped the similarity, with lines like, "See your Prime Minister on screen" and "the story of a great woman political leader in post-Independence India", were featured in a film magazine. Eventually, the film was given a go-ahead after it was seen by two staff members and then Information and Broadcasting minister, I.K. Gujral. After the release, similarity was seen in the dressing and mannerism of lead Aarti Devi, played by Suchitra Sen and Mrs Gandhi, including the sarees and streak of white hair. During the June Legislative assembly election campaign in Gujarat, some opposition politicians showed scenes of the film, depicting Aarti Devi smoking and drinking. As the film gained momentum, some ambitious exhibitors even started promoting the film with the line, "See Indira Gandhi in Aandhi", by now film was openly courting controversy, despite being only a mild satire on politicians. The film was eventually banned after 26 weeks after its release. In June State of Emergency was declared in India by Mrs. Gandhi and on 12 July despite heavy press censorship, The Statesman managed to carry the headline on its front page, "Screening on Aandhi banned". Gulzar who had then taken the film to Moscow International Film Festival got the news of the ban prior to the screening. He was also informed that the film publicity posters be taken down and the prints sent back.

Subsequently, while Mausam was being premiered in December 1975, portions of Aandhi were being reshot. It included the controversial drinking scene and to establish the fact it was not a biopic, a scene with Aarti Devi looking at the framed image of Indira Gandhi tells her father that she wants to serve India like Mrs Gandhi, "Woh meri ideal thi" (She is my ideal) was inserted. After Indira Gandhi lost the general election of 1977 and Janata Party came to power it was re-released and also shown on the state-run national television. The film went on to become biggest hit of the Sen's Bollywood career, of which Aandhi was the last film, though she did two more Bengali films before retiring from acting in 1978.

== Historical accuracy ==
Some critics, including Subhash K. Jha have drawn thematic parallels between Indira Gandhi and her father Jawaharlal Nehru as depicted in the film also references to their personal lives. Also the role of Sanjeev Kumar, having shades of Mrs. Gandhi's husband. All through the controversy, Gulzar denied any connection with Indira Gandhi, it was only after she lost the national elections in 1977 and Janata Party came to power, did he admit, "Yes, the film was made with Indira Gandhi in mind". Sanjeev Kumar on his part said, only the characterisation of his role was based on Feroze Gandhi.

== Bibliography ==
- Kali Aandhi (Hindi), by Kamleshwar. Rajpal and Sons, 2003. ISBN 9788170285625.
- Gulzar (2005). Aandhi (Screenplay) (in Hindi). Radhakrishna Prakashan. ISBN 978-81-8361-004-9.
- Gulzar (2007). Aandhi: A Scenario. Srishti Publishers. ISBN 978-81-88575-90-9.
- Lalit Mohan Joshi (2002). Bollywood: Popular Indian cinema. Dakini Books. ISBN 9780953703227.
- Chatterjee, Saibal (2003). Encyclopaedia of Hindi Cinema. Popular Prakashan. ISBN 978-81-7991-066-5.
- Meghna Gulzar (2004). Because He Is--. Rupa & Company. ISBN 978-81-291-0364-2.
