= Lukochuri =

- Directed by: Kamal Majumdar
- Produced by: Kishore Kumar
- Starring: Kishore Kumar; Mala Sinha; Anita Guha
- Cinematography: Aloke Dasgupta
- Music by: Hemanta Mukherjee
- Release date: 27 June 1958
- Country: India
- Language: Bengali

Lukochuri (Bengali: লুকোচুরি) is a Bengali romantic comedy film directed by Kamal Majumdar and produced under the banner of Kishore Kumar Films. The film stars Kishore Kumar, Mala Sinha and Anita Guha in the lead roles. The film was released on 27 June 1958.

== Plot ==
Kumar leaves home to find work in Bombay, staying with his twin brother, Shankar. Sankar wants to be a musician and holds a torch for an artist named Geeta. At work, he meets Reeta, Geeta's younger sister, and their friendship soon develops into something more.

== Cast ==
- Kishore Kumar – Shankar / Kumar 'Buddhu' (Double Role)
- Mala Sinha – Reeta
- Anita Guha – Geeta
- Anoop Kumar
- Keshto Mukherjee
- Nripati Chattopadhyay
- Ajit Chatterjee
- Moni Chatterjee
- Bipin Gupta
- Rajlaksmi Devi
- Nabyendu Ghosh

== Soundtrack ==
All songs are lyrics by Gauriprasanna Mazumder & music by Hemanta Mukherjee except "Mayabonobiharini Horini" which was written and composed by Rabindranth Tagore.

#	Song	Singer
1	"Shing Nei Tobu Naam Tar Singha"	Kishore Kumar
2	"Ek Paloker Ektu Dekha"	Kishore Kumar
3	"Shudhu Ektukhani Chaowa"	Kishore Kumar, Geeta Dutt
4	"Mayabonobiharini Horini"	Kishore Kumar, Ruma Guha Thakurta
5	"Ei To Hethay Kunjo Chhayay"	Kishore Kumar, Ruma Guha Thakurta
6	"Muchhe Jaoa Dinguli"	Hemanta Mukherjee
7	"Tomaro Geeti Jagalo Smriti" (Unpicturised Song)	Hemanta Mukherjee, Ruma Guha Thakurta
