= Kitne Pakistan =

2000 book by Kamleshwar

- Author: Kamleshwar
- Original title: कितने पाकिस्तान
- Language: Hindi
- Subject: partition of India
- Genre: historical novel
- Published: 2000 by Rajpal & Sons, Delhi
- Publication place: India
- Pages: 361 pages
- Awards: Sahitya Akademi Award (2003)
- ISBN: 8170283205 (2000 ed.)
- OCLC: 44951976
- Dewey Decimal: 891.433
- LC Class: PK2098.K26
- Preceded by: Not Flowers of Henna

Kitne Pakistan (translation: How Many Pakistan?) is a 2000 Hindi novel by Kamleshwar, noted 20th-century Hindi writer, a pioneer of the Nayi Kahani ("New Story") movement of the 1950s, and later screenwriter for Hindi cinema. The novel combines allegory and realism, and deals with a vast expanse of human history, as it follows the rise of sectarianism, nationalism, Hindutva and communalism, raising questions about the true motives of the people who make decisions on the behalf and for common people, who throughout the history have borne the brunt of their decision. It witnesses the violence, separation and bloodshed in the aftermath of partition of India in 1947 and examines the nature and futility of divisive politics and religion.

It won the 2003 Sahitya Akademi Award for Hindi, given by Sahitya Akademi, India's National Academy of Letters. Today, the novel is considered as the author's finest work, and one of the classics of modern Hindi literature.

== History ==
Kamleshwar started working his ambitious novel in May 1990, aiming to understand Partition through allegory and realism.

The first English translation of the novel came in 2001, in a partition anthology Translating partition published by Katha, which also featured works by Saadat Hasan Manto and Bhisham Sahni. This was followed by another translation by Ameena Kazi Ansari, Partitions was published by Penguin Books in 2006, subsequently it was widely anthologised, It has been subject of several critical studies, including Partition stories : mapping community, communalism, and gender (2009) by Vinod K Chopra. In 2013, another study, Kitne Pakistan: sampradayika vimarsha (Dialogue on communalism) of the novel was published by Pratapsingh Rajput.

The novel achieved both popular and critical acclaim, it has been translated into several languages including Marathi and French.

== Summary ==
In a fictional court, various historical characters are brought to the witness's box and asked to narrate their version of history. These historical personalities range from mughal emperors Babur and Aurangzeb, Spanish adventurer Hernando Cortez, Lord Mountbatten, Adolf Hitler and Saddam Hussein, along with political leaders, religious zealots and even scheming Gods of mythology, many are accused of creating innumerable divided nations and people, and a legacy of hatred and distrust. The only arbiter standing for the humanity, is an unnamed abeed, littérateur. He listens to the witnesses, and mulls over the casualties of Kurukshetra, Kargil, Hiroshima and Nagasaki, Nazi Germany, East Timor, the Aztec civilization and mythological Greece to Bosnia.

== Legacy ==
In a 2007 interview, poet-lyricist Gulzar with whom Kamleshwar had work in film career, noted about the novel, "I had underlined so many sentences that were potential short stories or film material. There is a description where a handkerchief falls off the bridge; I always used to tell him that I could write a complete short story on this one line only." The novel has also been adapted to a play in 2013.

== Translation ==
- Partitions, Penguin Books, 2006. ISBN 0-14-400099-7 (Reprint: 2008, ISBN 978-0-14-306370-4)

== See also ==
- Artistic depictions of the partition of India

== Bibliography ==
- Attia Hosain (2001). Translating partition: stories; essays; criticism. Katha. ISBN 978-81-87649-04-5.
- Vinod K. Chopra (2009). Partition Stories: Mapping Community, Communalism, and Gender. Anamika Publishers & Distributors. ISBN 978-81-7975-233-3.
- Pratapsingh Rajput (2013). Kitane Pākistān: sāmpradāyika vimarśa (in Hindi). Vinaya Prakāśana. ISBN 978-81-89187-15-6.
