= Chandrashekhar =

Chandrasekhar, Chandrashekhar or Chandra Shekhar is an Indian name and may refer to a number of individuals. The name comes from the name of an incarnation of the Hindu god Shiva. In this form he married the goddess Parvati. Etymologically, the name comes from the Sanskrit words "चन्द्र (chandra)", meaning "moon", and "शेखर (śekhara)", meaning "crest" or "crown", which is an epithet of the Shiva.

== Notable people with this name ==
=== Politics and activism ===
- Chandra Shekhar Azad (1906–1931), known as Azad ("The Free"), Indian revolutionary who organised the Hindustan Socialist Republican Army (HSRA)
- Chandrashekhar Azad (politician), Indian activist and politician, founder of Bhim Army and Azad Samaj Party
- K. M. Chandrasekhar (born 1948), Indian Cabinet Secretary
- Sripati Chandrasekhar (1918–2001), Indian demographer and politician
- Chandra Shekhar Dubey (born 1946), member of the 14th Lok Sabha of India
- Chandrashekhar B. Patil (born 1970), Member of the Karnataka Legislative Council
- Chandrashekhar S. Patil (1918–1960), Member of the Legislative Assembly of India
- Chandrashekhar Prasad (died 1997), assassinated Indian student activist
- Kalvakuntla Chandrashekar Rao (born 1954), known as K.C.R., Indian politician and the first Chief Minister of Telangana
- Chandra Shekhar Singh, known as Chandra Shekhar (1927–2007), eighth Prime Minister of India (1990–91)
- Chandrasekhar Singh (1915–1976), deputy leader of the Communist Party of India
- Chandrashekhar Singh, member of the Indian National Congress, Chief Minister of Bihar 1983–85

=== Sports ===
- Bhagwat Chandrasekhar (B. S. Chandrasekhar, informally "Chandra"; born 1945), Indian cricketer
- O. Chandrashekar, former Indian professional footballer
- Raghavendra Chandrashekar (born 1982), Indian cricketer
- Rajesh Chandrasekar (born 1989), Indian road and track cyclist
- Chandrasekhar Gadkari (1928–1998), Indian cricketer
- Chinta Chandrashekar Rao (born 1988), Indian football player
- Venugopal Chandrasekhar, Indian table tennis player

=== Arts and entertainment ===
- Chandrashekar Bandiyappa, known as CSB, South Indian film director
- Bala Devi Chandrashekar, American Bharatanatyam dancer
- Cudavalli Chandrashekar (1955–2018), Indian actor and filmmaker in Kannada cinema
- Hitha Chandrashekar, Indian film actress who works in Kannada films
- Jay Chandrasekhar (born 1968), American film actor, director and writer
- Joseph Vijay Chandrashekar (known simply as Vijay), Indian politician and film actor and playback singer who works in Tamil cinema (Kollywood), also the 9th Chief Minister of Tamil Nadu.
- Lakshmi Chandrashekar, Indian film actress in the Kannada film industry, and a theatre artist in Karnataka, India
- Nagathihalli Chandrashekhar, Indian director, actor, screenwriter and lyricist working predominantly in Kannada cinema
- Shoba Chandrasekhar, an Indian playback singer
- Vagai Chandrasekhar (known simply as Chandrasekhar), Tamil film actor
- S. A. Chandrasekhar (born 1945), an Indian film director
- Chandrashekhar Dubey (1924–1993), Indian actor and radio personality
- Chandrashekhara Kambara (born 1937), Indian poet, playwright, and professor
- Chandrashekar "Champa" Patil (1939–2022), Indian poet and playwright
- Chandrashekhar Vaidya (known simply as Chandrashekhar; 1922–2021), Bollywood film actor
- Chandra Sekhar Yeleti (born 1973), Tollywood film director

=== Science and academia ===
- Hariharan Chandrashekar (born 1956), Indian environmental economist, eco-entrepreneur, writer, and policy advocate and urban analyst
- Sivaramakrishna Chandrasekhar (1930–2004), Indian physicist
- Srinivasan Chandrasegaran, pioneer in genome editing
- Srinivasan Chandrasekaran (born 1945), Indian chemist
- Subrahmanyan Chandrasekhar (1910–1995), British Indian-American astrophysicist and Nobel laureate in physics, after whom the astrophysics formula Chandrasekhar limit and quantity Chandrasekhar number are named
- Tavarekere Kalliah Chandrashekar (born 1956), Indian bioinorganic chemist, former director of National Institute for Interdisciplinary Science & Technology
- Chandrasekhara Venkata Raman (1888–1970), Indian physicist and Nobel laureate in physics
- Chandrashekhar Khare, professor of mathematics at the University of California Los Angeles
- Chandra Sekhar Sankurathri, founder of free Sarada Vidyalayam School and Srikiran Institute of Ophthalmology
- Y. S. Chandrashekhar, Indian-American cardiologist

=== Business ===
- Chandrashekhar Agashe (1888–1956), Indian industrialist

== See also ==
- Anna University K B Chandrashekar Research Centre in the Madras Institute of Technology (MIT)
- Chandrahar
