= Surang =

- Film poster
- Directed by: V. Shantaram
- Produced by: V. Shantaram
- Starring: Chandrashekhar; Sheila Ramani; Ulhas; Vikas
- Music by: Shivram Krishna
- Production company: Rajkamal Kalamandir
- Release date: 1953
- Running time: 150 minutes
- Country: India
- Language: Hindi

Surang (lit. 'Mine') is a 1953 film directed by V. Shantaram for his Rajkamal Kalamandir banner. The story and dialogue were by Vinod Kumar with music by Shivram Krishna and lyrics by Shewan Rizwi. The actor Chandrashekhar came into prominence with his role of a miner in the film. The rest of cast included Shashikala, Sheila Ramani, Vinod Kumar, Ulhas and Vikas.

The film was made at a time when Shantaram was producing his social films of "exceptional merit" such as Apna Desh (1949), Dahej, Parchhain (1952) and Teen Batti Char Raasta (1953). The film was about the plight of quarry workers, and the roles of Chandrashekhar as the quarry worker and Shashikala as the crazy but astute girl were commended.

== Plot ==
When one of the quarry workers dies, the management asks the workers to continue, saying people die every day. This incites the workers, and, led by one of them, they approach the owner, whose daughter is not sympathetic to their arguments. The owner promises to look after the fate of their children and the workers return to work. The mad girl Pagli (crazy) laughs at the departing miners as she knows the promises are false. Vikas, the Seth's son, just returning after completing his medical studies, gets interested in her. The story follows the change in the daughter's behaviour over a period of time as she interacts with the workers and Pagli and the Seth's son's relationship.

== Cast ==
- Shashikala
- Sheila Ramani
- Vinod Kumar
- Vikas
- Chandrashekhar
- Keshavrao Date
- Ullhas
- Jogendra
- Gajendra

== Crew ==
- Director: V. Shantaram
- Banner: Rajkamal Kalamandir
- Music: Shivram Krishna
- Lyrics: Shewan
- Story: Vinod Kumar
- Dialogue: Vinod Kumar
- Make-up: Vardam
- Assistant Director: Prabhat Kumar
- Cinematographer: G. Balkrishna, Kirtiwan
- Editing: Chintamani Borkar
- Art director: P. S. Kale
- Audiographer: A. K. Parmar
- Background music: Vasant Desai
- Choreographer: Arjun

== Soundtrack ==
The music was composed by Shivram Krishna, with lyrics by Shewan Rizvi. The playback singing was by Lata Mangeshkar, Asha Bhosle, Manna Dey and Sulochana Kadam.

== Song list ==
Song	Singer
"Chhalke Na Gham Ke Pyale"	Lata Mangeshkar
"Gehri Gehri Nadiya Mein"	Lata Mangeshkar
"Guzri Thi Raat Aadhi"	Lata Mangeshkar
"Chal Ae Dile Majboor"	Manna Dey
"Sonewale Jaag Zara, Kyun Samay Suhana Khota Hai"	Manna Dey, Sulochana Kadam
"Mast Bahar Hai"	Asha Bhosle
