= Amanush (1974 film) =

1974 Bengali action film directed by Shakti Samanta

- Theatrical release poster
- Directed by: Shakti Samanta
- Screenplay by: Shakti Samanta; Shaktipada Rajguru
- Dialogues by: Bengali: Shaktipada Rajguru; Prabhat Roy; Gauriprasanna Mazumder; Hindi: Kamleshwar
- Story by: Shaktipada Rajguru
- Based on: Naya Basat by Shaktipada Rajguru
- Produced by: Shakti Samanta
- Starring: Uttam Kumar; Sharmila Tagore; Utpal Dutt; Anil Chatterjee
- Cinematography: Aloke Dasgupta
- Edited by: Bijoy Chowdhury
- Music by: Shyamal Mitra
- Production company: Shakti Films
- Distributed by: Shakti Films
- Release dates: 18 October 1974 (Bengali); 21 March 1975 (Hindi)
- Running time: 153 minutes
- Country: India
- Languages: Bengali; Hindi

Amanush (Bengali pronunciation: [əˈmɑːnuʃ]; transl. Inhuman) is a 1974 Indian action film produced and directed by Shakti Samanta under his banner of Shakti Films. Simultaneously shot in Bengali and Hindi languages, the film is based on Shaktipada Rajguru's story Naya Basat. It stars Uttam Kumar in the titular role, alongside Sharmila Tagore, Utpal Dutt and Anil Chatterjee, while Prema Narayan, Abhi Bhattacharya, Amarnath Mukherjee and Asit Sen play other pivotal roles, with Shambhu Bhattacharya in a special appearance. The film follows Madhu, who transforms into a penniless drunkard from a scion of a landlord family, after getting implicated in a false murder case by a vindictive man.

The film began production in 1973, marking the first collaboration between Samanta and Kumar. It was filmed in the Sunderbans over a span of two and a half months, with portions shot in Mumbai. The screenplay is written by Rajguru, while the Bengali and Hindi dialogues are written by Prabhat Roy, who was also the assistant director of the film, and Kamleshwar respectively. The music of the film is composed by Shyamal Mitra, with Bengali and Hindi lyrics penned by Gauriprasanna Mazumder and Indeevar respectively.

The Bengali version of Amanush was theatrically released on 18 October 1974, coinciding with Durga Puja, emerging to be an all-time blockbuster at the box office with a long run in theatres consisting of 96 weeks in West Bengal and became the highest grossing Bengali film of 1974. Five months after, the Hindi version was released on 21 March 1975, also declared to be a huge hit and became favourable among the Hindi audiences. It featured many iconic songs by Kishore Kumar like "Bipinbabur Karon Sudha" and "Ki Ashay Bandhi Khelaghar". The combined sales of the original soundtrack and the dialogues (released separately), set new sales records. The film's dialogue and certain characters became extremely popular, contributing to numerous cultural memes and becoming part of India's daily vernacular.

The film was later remade in Telugu as Edureeta (1977), starring N. T. Rama Rao; in Malayalam as Ithaa Oru Manushyan (1978) starring Madhu and in Tamil as Thyagam (1978), starring Sivaji Ganesan.

== Plot ==
Madhusudan Roy Chaudhary aka Madhu, is a straightforward scion of a zamindar family settled in a fishing village in the Sundarbans. He reflects angst and anger with understated ease after his life is ripped asunder by the machinations of the family munim, Mahim Ghoshal. Reduced to a penniless drunkard, he is condemned to live the life of an Amanush — half human, and half beast. As a debauched vagabond, he raises his voice on behalf of the downtrodden who suffer under the highhanded and corrupt Ghosal. This brings him face to face with the law enforcers, who are often hand in glove with the wily Ghosal.

It is in this backdrop that Inspector Bhuvan lands in the village, where Ghosal 'fills his ears' against Madhu. Bhuvan, without going into merits of the case, acts harshly on Madhu, even whipping him at the police station. However, he soon learns the story of Madhu and his estranged love interest, Lekha.

In a flashback, Madhu tells him how he was entrapped in a fake case of theft in his own house, whereon his ailing paternal uncle, under the influence of the munim, handed him over to the police. He is also accused of fathering a child through a prostitute. Before he can prove his innocence the woman is abducted and killed at the behest of Mahim. On completing his prison sentence, Madhu returns to his village, only to find that his uncle has been murdered by the munim, who shows it as a case of natural death.

Thereon, Bhuvan embarks on a mission to reform Madhu and gets him a contract for building a dam in an adjoining village. A determined Madhu, with his two sidekicks, completes the job commendably. He even wins back the confidence of Lekha, whom he saves from drunken streamer operators one night. But the ice is finally broken when the village is endangered by raging flood waters that threaten to breach the dam. All villagers persuade Madhu to take the mantle of saving the village, but he spurns them, blaming them for his misery. Finally, on a visit by Rekha he relents, and saves the dam and the village from havoc.

Meanwhile, Madhu's honour is restored, as is his love interest. Ghosal is arrested for his wrongdoings by Bhuvan, even as he is transferred to a new posting.

== Cast ==
- Uttam Kumar as Madhusudan "Madhu" Roy Chowdhury
- Sharmila Tagore as Rekha
- Prema Narayan as Maton aka Dhanno
- Anil Chatterjee as Police Inspector Bhuvan Roy
- Utpal Dutt as Mahim Ghosal
- Abhi Bhattacharya as Dr. Anand, Lekha's elder brother
- Manmohan as Sanatan
- Asit Sen as Pujari
- Manik Dutt
- Tarun Ghosh as Pada
- Rajni Gupta
- Subroto Mahapatra as Jyoti
- Amol Sen as Constable
- Probir Roy
- Shambhu Bhattacharya as Omar Singh
- Prabhat Roy as the launch driver

== Production ==
The film was based on Shaktipada Rajguru's novel Naya Basat which he written based on the people of Sundarban and there lifestyle.

This is the second Hindi film of Uttam after Choti Si Mulaqat in 1967 which he produced himself. But that failed to create any record and became a disaster at the box office, he didn't act in Hindi films till Shakti Samanta convinced him to work.

Generally this film was shot in Sandeshkhali, Sundarbans. The name of the village where the shooting took place is Bhangatushkhali. The name of that village was shown in the film as Dhanekhali. For the purpose of shooting, about forty houses, zamindarbari, doctor's office, market, Radhagobindar temple, police station, school were built here. That Radhagobindar temple and the wooden bungalow where Uttam Kumar lived are still there. There is also that launch. Uttam Kumar would easily mingle with the people of the village during the shooting. He used to take children in his lap. He even helped people with money. That is why even today, on the day of his death on 24 July, a wreath is laid on his picture, which is a cultural event.

Shakti Samanta wanted to made this film in double version Hindi and Bengali for Kumar. Director Prabhat Roy (who also assistant director of this film) remained the shooting of this film. While shooting the song "Ki Ashay Bandhi Khelaghar" on the launch. They had lost the track in the deep jungle. Then Shakti Samanta saw a small light reflected from a grocer shop. When the shopkeeper came and saw Uttam Kumar he immediately ran away. Some moments later they see hundreds of people gathering in the bank of the river to see their guru Uttam Kumar.

== Soundtrack ==
Amanush

Film score by Shyamal Mitra
- Released: 1975
- Recorded: 1974
- Studio: Shakti Films
- Genres: Featured film soundtrack, Bengali ghazals
- Label: Sa Re Ga Ma
- Producer: Shakti Samanta

=== Bengali ===
All lyrics are written by Gauriprasanna Mazumder; all music is composed by Shyamal Mitra.

No.	Title	Lyrics	Music	Singer(s)	Length
1.	"Bipin Babur Karon Sudha"	Gauriprasanna Mazumder	Shyamal Mitra	Kishore Kumar	4:04
2.	"Ki Ashay Bandhi Khelaghar"	Gauriprasanna Mazumder	Shyamal Mitra	Kishore Kumar	4:29
3.	"Jodi Hoyi Chor Kanta"	Gauriprasanna Mazumder	Shyamal Mitra	Kishore Kumar; Asha Bhosle	3:20
4.	"Jani Na Aaj Je Apon"	Gauriprasanna Mazumder	Shyamal Mitra	Asha Bhosle	2:42
5.	"Na Na Na Omon Kore"	Gauriprasanna Mazumder	Shyamal Mitra	Asha Bhosle	3:10
6.	"Jokhon Manusher Dukhe Debtara Kande"	Gauriprasanna Mazumder	Shyamal Mitra	Shyamal Mitra	3:22
Total length:					21:35

=== Hindi ===
All lyrics are written by Indeevar.

No.	Title	Lyrics	Music	Singer(s)	Length
1.	"Na Puchho Koi Humein"	Indeevar	Shyamal Mitra	Kishore Kumar	4:26
2.	"Dil Aisa Kisi Ne Mera Toda"	Indeevar	Shyamal Mitra	Kishore Kumar	5:07
3.	"Tere Gaalon Ko Choomoon"	Indeevar	Shyamal Mitra	Kishore Kumar and Asha Bhosle	2:58
4.	"Kal Ke Apne Na Jaane Kyun"	Indeevar	Shyamal Mitra	Asha Bhosle	4:05
5.	"Gham Ki Dawaa To Pyaar Hai"	Indeevar	Shyamal Mitra	Asha Bhosle	3:05
6.	"Nadiya Mein Lahre Naachein"	Indeevar	Shyamal Mitra	Shyamal Mitra	3:46
Total length:					23:27

The mukhda of song 'Gham ki data to pyar hai' is very similar to the song 'Shokh nazar ki bijaliyaan' from the movie Woh Kaun Thi ? (1964).

== Release ==
This was a double version film. Shoot stimulationally Hindi and Bengali. The Bengali version was released in 1974 at Durga Puja. The Hindi version was released on 21 March 1975.

== Reception ==
=== Reviews ===
The Hindu wrote in an article 2013 Uttam Kumar, numero uno of the deeply entrenched Bengali cinema, is a case in point, as he managed to get roles in only a few Hindi films before his untimely death at the age of 53 in 1980. One only needs to watch Shakti Samantha’s “Amanush” (made simultaneously in Bengali and Hindi) to marvel at the scope of the man’s histrionic capabilities. Kumar shines as Madhusudan Roy Chaudhary, or Madhu, a straightforward scion of a zamindar family settled in a fishing village in the Sunderbans. He reflects angst and anger with understated ease after his life is ripped asunder by the machinations of the family munim, Maheem Ghosal (a superlative performance by veteran Utpal Dutt). Reduced to a penniless drunkard, he is condemned to live the life of an amanush — half human, and half beast. As a debauched vagabond, he raises his voice on behalf of the downtrodden who suffer under the highhanded and corrupt Ghosal. This brings him face to face with the law enforcers, who are often hand in glove with the wily Ghosal.

The Print wrote in 2022 Uttam Kumar does a brilliant job of bringing out the angst and the anger of the character, while also making you empathise with him throughout. Sharmila Tagore's Rekha is a strong woman, who is conflicted between her love for Madhu and the hurt of his betrayal. Utpal Dutt as the vicious villain is the one who shines throughout the film, and actually makes you forget that it is the same Utpal Dutt who was a master comedic actor.

=== Box office ===
The Bengali version create a record at Bengal box office and become golden jubilee hit. In a theater the film take a long run as 96 weeks. This is the longest running and most successful film of Kumar entire career. The Bengali version collected a record ₹1.8 Crore. The film became highest grossing Bengali film ever of that time. Hindi version become also success and become silver jubilee hit. But at the Bengaluru Swapna theater the film ran for 65 weeks. This was first and only successful Hindi film of Uttam Kumar's career.

== Awards and nominations ==
- Filmfare Awards
  - 1976: Filmfare Award for Best Film - Shakti Samanta (Nominated)
  - 1976: Filmfare Award for Best Director - Shakti Samanta (Nominated)
  - 1976: Filmfare Award for Best Actor - Uttam Kumar (Nominated)
  - 1976: Filmfare Award for Best Supporting Actress - Prema Narayan (Nominated)
  - 1976: Filmfare Award Best Male Playback Singer - Kishore Kumar for the song "Dil Aisa Kisine Mera Toda"
  - 1976: Filmfare Award for Best Female Playback Singer - Asha Bhosle for the song "Kal Ke Apne" (Nominated)
  - 1976: Filmfare Award Best Lyricist - Indevaar
  - 1976: Filmfare Special Award - Uttam Kumar
  - Filmfare Awards East for Best Film - Amanush (1975)
  - Filmfare East Award for Best Actor - Uttam Kumar (1975)
- Bengal Film Journalists' Association Awards
  - 1975: Bengal Film Journalists' Association - Best Actor Award - Uttam Kumar

== Remakes ==
For the popularity of this film this was remade in South India with N. T. Rama Rao in a Telugu remake called Edureeta in 1977; the Tamil remake was Thyagam with Sivaji Ganesan in 1978; the remake in Malayalam in 1978 was title Ithaa Oru Manushyan.
