= Shing Nei Tobu Naam Tar Singha =

1958 song by Kishore Kumar

- Cassette with the song cover art

Song by Kishore Kumar

from the album Lukochuri
- Language: Bengali
- Released: June 27, 1958
- Genre: Rock and roll
- Length: 2:57 (original film version); 2:43 (digitalized film version); 4:57 (original with dialogue)
- Label: Saregama
- Songwriters: Hemanta Mukhopadhyay; Gauriprasanna Mazumder
- Producer: Kishore Kumar

Music video
- "Sing Nei Tobu Naam Tar Singha" on YouTube

"Shing Nei Tobu Naam Tar Singha" is a Bengali song by the playback singer Kishore Kumar, written by Gauriprasanna Mazumder and composed by Hemanta Mukherjee. It was released as part of the film Lukochuri on June 27, 1958. It is considered to be the first rock and roll song of Bengali language, featuring fast-paced lyrics, along with a humored theme and fun-mooded lyrics. It was also included in music albums and cassettes designated for Durga Puja festival in Bengal. It is regarded as one of the most popular songs of Kumar, and is referred to as an evergreen Bengali song.

The song's music given by Mukherjee was inspired by the 1919 American song "Oh By Jingo!", specifically the 1949 cover version by American singer Danny Kaye. It was also influenced by other western music.

== Composition ==
"Shing Nei Tobu Naam Tar Singha" is a "quirky and fun Bengali song", having fast-paced and nonsensical lyrics. It is said to be the first rock and roll in the Bengali language, written by lyricist Gauriprasanna Mazumder, composed by singer Hemanta Mukhopadhyay, and recorded by the playback singer Kishore Kumar. It also has brass instrumental sections which was not previously used in the same method in songs.

In the film, Kishore Kumar sang the song while dancing to it, with his dual role character also shown in a few scenes. It is considered as a "comedic relief" in consideration of the visuals, storytelling, and story of Lukochuri.

== Performances and influence ==
Actress Rakhee Gulzar was heard singing "Shing Nei Tobu Naam Tar Singha" in front of the Victoria Memorial monument in Kolkata, after spotting a few lion statues at the gates, which the The Times of India described as "a playful, nostalgic gesture that reflected her signature grace and spontaneity." This took place during the shooting of the 2025 film Aamar Boss, directed by Shiboprosad Mukherjee. Mukherjee remarked that Rakhee Gulzar was happy about the place and the food at Kolkata, which reminded her of old memories, and was happy about it, with Mukherjee saying "She asked us to take a picture of her in front of the statue of the lion, and then she started singing the song, Shingh nei tobu naam tar shingho."

The song was sung in the Anandalok Tarar Khonje competition at Kalamandir on November 11, 2007, organized by Kolkata Film and Television Institute. It was featured in the second round of it, where the contestants sang it in a proper lip-syncing along with other classic and popular Bengali songs. A contestant named Sabarni Sourik performed it in a show at Super Singer Junior in 2019. Usha Uthup performed the song in 2014 in a Bengali program titled Song Connection, which also portrayed other Bengali music. Later in August 2024 in a concert commemorating Kumar, Gautam Ghosh sang it, which gained positive reception from the audience, with Uthup present in it. "Shing Nei Tobu" was also rendered multiple times starting from 2007 by a fan club of Kumar in Malda.

Bengali singer and composer Rupam Islam cited Kishore Kumar as one of the reasons he was drawn into playback singing and recording songs for films. He sang a remake version of it named "Shing Nei Tobu" in the 2010 Bengali film Shukno Lanka. It was picturized on actor Mithun Chakraborty. The music director of the film was Debojyoti Mishra. Rupam Islam said that he only took courage to sing it for commercial release on the music direction of Mishra, and asked him not to promote the song in any way.

Singer Rupankar Bagchi said that he performed many songs of Kishore Kumar when asked by the audience, excluding "Shing Nei Tobu Naam Tar Singha", commenting about it: "At any event or function, people, ask me to sing Kishoreda's songs and I do. But I will not dare to sing Shing nei tobu naam tar singha, as it is a difficult number where he has acted through the song."

In the 1966 film Biwi Aur Makan, directed by Hrishikesh Mukherjee, the hip song "Khul sim sim khullam khulla" was sung primarily by Manna Dey, with music given by Hemanta Mukherjee. Mukherjee adapted the tune and singing style from "Shing Nei Tobu Naam Tar Singha" and also from "Oh By Jingo!". It was performed and recorded in a studio with a live mini orchestra playing.

== In popular culture ==
"Shing Nei Tobu Naam Tar Singha" became known for its nonsensical lyrics in Bengal and is deemed the best known nonsensical song of Bengali cinema. It was popularized by its use in an advertisement by the milk drink company Bournvita owned by Cadbury.

== Cover versions ==
=== Kumar Sanu ===
"Shing Nei Tobu"

Single by Kumar Sanu

from the album Kishore Kumar Junior
- Language: Bengali
- Released: October 6, 2018 (single); October 12, 2018 (with film)
- Studio: Sana Music World, Mumbai
- Length: 3:05
- Label: Saregama
- Songwriters: Gauriprasanna Mazumder; Indraadip Dasgupta
- Producer: Indraadip Dasgupta

Music video
- "Shing Nei Tobu" on YouTube

Singer Kumar Sanu sang a remake of the original song in the 2018 film Kishore Kumar Junior, directed by Kaushik Ganguly. It depicted the story of a singer who sang songs that were originally sung by Kishore Kumar. Titled "Shing Nei Tobu", it served as a tribute to Kumar, being the sixth track in it. The music for it was recreated by Indraadip Dasgupta, while the lyrics remained the same as written by Gauriprasanna Mazumder. Dasgupta added extra music in the background to simulate the style of a live band playing the song. It is picturized on the film's lead actor Prosenjit Chatterjee.

==== Personnel ====
- Written by Gauriprasanna Mazumder and composed by Indraadip Dasgupta
- Arranged by Somen Kutty Sarkar
- Indian percussions by Prem Singh
- Rhythm guitars by Ehsaan Akhtar
- Electric guitars by Rahul Sharma
- Flutes by Tejas Venchurkar
- Mixed and mastered by Amit Chatterjee
- Recorded by Krishna M Gupta at Sana Music World, Mumbai

=== NK Naga ===
NK Naga (Ngukavi), a singer from Nagaland, rendered a cover version of "Shing Nei Tobu Naam Tar Singha" on his official YouTube channel in February 2021. Regarding the song, he said that he chose to cover the song as a tribute to all Bengalis who resided in India. He credited Kishore Kumar, stating that he performed it because Kumar had always been an inspiration for him. According to ABP Ananda, Naga tried his best to sing it in a pure Bengali accent, which was praised by listeners. His rendition of the 1958 song went viral on YouTube, gaining a large number of views. Naga was endorsed by many of the comments in his video. Ei Samay and others reported that his Bengali pronunciation gained attention for being near-perfect. He tried to retain the facial expressions of Kumar while singing the song in the studio. After this rendition, Naga went to Mumbai and sang for the Bollywood music industry.

The music video accompanying Naga's cover version showed him recording it on a microphone while inside a recording studio. It was first released by him onto his official YouTube channel. It gained about 26,000 views on the video after 6 days of its release, according to Hindustan Times. He appeared in the music video with efforts to match the facial expressions demonstrated by Kumar in the 1958 song of the original film, in which he appeared in dual roles.

NK Naga said to Nagaland Express that, he is "expressing happiness through music and showing unity through music. Kishore Da is my inspiration and by singing Bengali I'm trying to express my love for Bengalis." He remarked in his music video, "Kishore Da is my inspiration and I tried to express my love for Bengalis by singing in their language." Besides his video on YouTube, Naga also released it on various other social media platforms. One of the comments on his video stated "Singing Bengali song with that expression is perfection … And singing Kishore da song is not easy … still you did it Fabulous job Keep going [sic]"
