= Kishore Kumar Junior =

2018 Indian Bengali film by Kaushik Ganguly

- Directed by: Kaushik Ganguly
- Screenplay by: Kaushik Ganguly
- Story by: Kaushik Ganguly
- Produced by: Rupa Dutta
- Starring: Prosenjit Chatterjee; Aparajita Auddy; Rwitobroto Mukherjee
- Cinematography: Gopi Bhagat
- Edited by: Subhajit Singha
- Music by: Indradip Dasgupta
- Production company: Camellia Production Pvt. Ltd.
- Distributed by: PVR Pictures; Dream Merchant
- Release date: 12 October 2018
- Country: India
- Language: Bengali

Kishore Kumar Junior is a 2018 Indian Bengali-language musical drama film directed by Kaushik Ganguly, starring Prosenjit Chatterjee, and Aparajita Auddy in lead roles.

== Plot ==
This film is about a singer who sings only those songs sung by the legendary Indian singer Kishore Kumar. The title, Kishore Kumar Junior (KKJ), was bestowed by the famous singer himself. KKJ lives in Kolkata with his wife and son, and his band musicians are like his second family. KKJ, his wife, and band are invited to perform in a Government initiative, for some border villages in the state of Rajasthan. However, upon reaching Rajasthan, they are abducted by a group of Pakistanis, whose intentions are not clear. It is now up to KKJ to save his wife and band members.

== Cast ==
- Prosenjit Chatterjee as Rajat Ghosh aka Kishore Kumar Junior
- Aparajita Auddy as Rita Ghosh (Wife of KKJ)
- Rwitobroto Mukherjee as Rishi (Son of KKJ)
- Rajesh Sharma as Firoz, a terrorist operating the cross border terrorism in Rajasthan
- Masood Akhtar as Taufiq, Firoz's henchman
- Lama Halder as Khokon
- Kaushik Ganguly as Himself in a special appearance
- Mir Afsar Ali as Himself in a special appearance
- Kumar Sanu as Himself in a special appearance
- Rajat Ganguly as Suranjan Moitra, Central Minister

== Soundtrack ==
All lyrics are written by Majrooh Sultanpuri, Gauriprasanna Mazumder, Hasrat Jaipuri, Anand Bakshi, Mukul Dutt, Gulzar, A. Irshad, Kaushik Chakraborty; all music is composed by Indraadip Das Gupta.

Track listing
No.	Title	Lyrics	Music	Singer	Length
1.	"Ki Ashay Bandhi Khelaghar"	Gauriprasanna Mazumder	Shyamal Mitra, Recreated By: Indraadip Das Gupta	Kumar Sanu	4:46
2.	"Zindagi Ek Safar"	Hasrat Jaipuri	Shankar–Jaikishan, Recreated By: Indraadip Das Gupta	Kumar Sanu	3:32
3.	"Ek Din Pakhi Ure Jabe"	Mukul Dutt	R.D. Burman, Recreated By: Indraadip Dasgupta	Kumar Sanu	3:40
4.	"Woh Shaam Kuch Ajeeb"	Gulzar	Hemanta Mukherjee, Recreated By: Indraadip Dasgupta	Kumar Sanu	5:08
5.	"Amar Swapna Tumi Ogo"	Gauriprasanna Mazumder	Shyamal Mitra, Recreated By: Indraadip Dasgupta	Kumar Sanu	2:23
6.	"Shing Nei Tobu"	Gauriprasanna Mazumder	Hemanta Mukherjee, Recreated By: Indraadip Dasgupta	Kumar Sanu	3:31
7.	"Sedino Akashe Chilo Kato Tara II"	Gauriprasanna Mazumder	Kishore Kumar, Recreated By: Indraadip Dasgupta	Babul Supriyo	3:35
8.	"Sedino Akashe Chilo Kato Tara"	Gauriprasanna Mazumder	Kishore Kumar, Recreated By: Indraadip Dasgupta	Koushik Chakraborty	3:11
9.	"Kuch Toh Log Kahenge"	Anand Bakshi	R.D.Burman, Recreated By: Indraadip Dasgupta	Kumar Sanu	4:34
10.	"Chala Jata Hoon"	Majrooh Sultanpuri	R.D. Burman, Recreated By: Indraadip Dasgupta	Babul Supriyo	4:08
11.	"Akash Keno Daake"	Gauriprasanna Mazumder	R. D. Burman, Recreated by: Indraadip Dasgupta	Kumar Sanu	3:11
12.	"Panthi Hoon Main"	A. Irshad	Kishore Kumar, Recreated by: Indraadip Dasgupta	Kumar Sanu	3:41
13.	"Yeh Kya Hua"	Anand Bakshi	R. D. Burman, Recreated by: Indraadip Dasgupta	Kumar Sanu	3:27
14.	"Cholo Ure Jai"	Kaushik Chakraborty	Kaushik Chakraborty	Prithibi (Band)	6:12
15.	"Medley"			Kumar Sanu, Rimita Mukherjee	9:19

== Release ==
The film released in India on 12 October 2018, just before Durga Puja. Most of the songs in the movie are performed by Kumar Sanu, including the hit song "Ki Ashay Bandhi Khelaghar".
