= Ki Ashay Bandhi Khelaghar =

1974 song by Kishore Kumar

Song by Kishore Kumar

from the album Amanush
- Language: Bengali
- English title: On what hopes do I set up my playhouse
- Released: October 18, 1974
- Length: 4:29
- Label: Saregama
- Composer: Shyamal Mitra
- Lyricist: Gauriprasanna Mazumdar
- Producer: Shakti Samanta

Lyrical video
- "Ki Ashay Bandhi Khelaghar" on YouTube

"Ki Ashay Bandhi Khelaghar" (Bengali: কি আশায় বাঁধি খেলাঘর) is a Bengali-language song by Indian singer Kishore Kumar. The song was written by Gauriprasanna Mazumdar and composed by singer Shyamal Mitra. The song was released on October 18, 1974, used in the film Amanush directed and produced by Shakti Samanta. It became one of the most popular songs of Kishore Kumar and also of Bengali cinema. The song was lip-synced in the film by actor Uttam Kumar.

When Shyamal Mitra gave the written song by Gauriprasanna Mazumdar to Kishore Kumar to sing, he did not initially want to record it. Ruma Guha Thakurta, after hearing that the song was suggested to Kumar, said that she and others had heard the song being sung by Shyamal Mitra on radio before and warned him to not sing it. Mitra had talks with Kumar, after which he agreed to sing it, and was featured in Amanush.

During the shooting of film scenes to be used in the song, Shakti Samanta and Uttam Kumar were lost in Sandeshkhali jungle where they were filming, and were seen by a shopkeeper. The song was sung by Kumar Sanu in the 2018 film Kishore Kumar Junior.

== Recording and background ==
When "Ki Ashay Bandhi Khelaghar" written by Gauriprasanna Mazumdar was given to Kishore Kumar to record, he initially did not want to sing it. Later, actress and singer Ruma Guha Thakurta heard from Kumar about the song, and suggested him strictly not to sing it. Thakurta commented that she and others heard Shyamal Mitra sing the song on radio with his own voice, and said that Kumar would not be able to match the expressions and vocals of Mitra. She said that Kumar's vocals were flat and would not be liked by Bengali listeners. Afterwards, he phoned Mitra and spoke that he would not be able to record the song, along with comments given by Thakurta. Shyamal Mitra talked with him for a while and convinced him to record the song for Amanush in his own voice. It became one of the most popular and defining songs in Kumar's career.

During the shooting of film scenes for "Ki Ashay Bandhi Khelaghar", the sunlight decreased because it was turning night. Shakti Samanta, the producer and director, instructed the launch (ferry) they were shooting on to turn around as it was not possible to film any more scenes until the next day. The launch (ferry) named "Bisshoprem" was rented by Uttam Kumar, an actor of the film for 21 days for the purpose of using it during the filming. Inside the launch on the day were Uttam Kumar, Shakti Samanta, Utpal Dutt, and other crew of the Amanush. The driver of the launch was unable to find which way to go during the dusk with the presence of many small rivers in the jungle of Sandeshkhali. After some time, they drove deeper into a river where they found a small food shop with a light. The shopkeeper recognized Uttam Kumar and brought hundreds of people with him to meet with him. When the filming was wrapped up, the song became a massive success as a romantic song. It served a role in the 2024 Sandeshkhali violence event.

Shyamal Mitra was assigned as the music director and composer of Amanush's songs on the request of Shakti Samanta and Uttam Kumar. Mitra at this time had been working with musician R. D. Barman and left his workplace to work on the music. "Ki Ashay Bandhi Khelaghar", which Mitra had sung several times himself before, became a major hit song of Bengali cinema. With the success of the song by Kishore Kumar, Mitra got chances to compose and sing many songs in later Bengali films.

== Kishore Kumar Junior ==
"Ki Ashay Bandhi Khelaghar"

Single by Kumar Sanu

from the album Kishore Kumar Junior
- Language: Bengali
- Released: September 13, 2018
- Composer: Indraadip Dasgupta
- Lyricist: Gauriprasanna Mazumdar
- Producer: Rupa Dutta

In 2018 (October 12, 2018), Kaushik Ganguly released Kishore Kumar Junior, written and directed by him. It featured a story of a singer who only sang songs originally performed by Kishore Kumar. Actor Prosenjit Chatterjee "played the role of Uttam Kumar from Amanush". In Kishore Kumar Junior, a cover version of "Ki Ashay Bandhi Khelaghar" was featured, which was sung by singer Kumar Sanu. The song music was recreated by Indraadip Dasgupta. Chatterjee lip-synced to the song performed by Kumar Sanu. In the original film, Uttam Kumar lip-synced to Kishore Kumar's song. Inside the film, Chatterjee's neighbors, passer-bys and people gather around him within minutes as he sings it. Other songs by Kumar were featured in the film.

The song was released on September 13, 2018, a month before Kishore Kumar Junior was officially released in October 2018. The cover version (reprise version) became a popular song and boosted the upcoming film's popularity. Other songs were released following "Ki Ashay Bandhi Khelaghar", which was the first song to be released from the film soundtrack album.

== Test records ==
Paramananda Choudhury, a music archivist, amassed a great collection of music "test records" which included the first recorded song versions of musicians such as Rabindranath Tagore, K. L. Saigal, S. D. Barman, Hemanta Mukhopadhyay and Shyamal Mitra. Choudhury collected the records that spanned over fifty years and featured some unreleased songs by singers, starting from the 1950s. He stated: "The 'Ki Ashay Bandhi Khelaghar' song has only one available test record in Shyamal Mitra’s voice, with no other commercial album brought out by the music company concerned." (Note: Sources: Sengupta, Supratik (February 22, 2025). "First voice notes of legends: A vault of rare test records". Press Trust Of India.; "First voice notes of legends: A vault of rare test records". ThePrint. Press Trust of India. February 22, 2025.; "First voice notes of legends: A vault of rare test records". Deccan Herald. Press Trust of India. February 22, 2025.)

Choudhury released more of his collected music test records and archives in March 2026, which included songs sung by Suchitra Sen and Rabindranath Tagore. Newspapers stated that his collection included a test recording of the song in 1950, sung and composed by Shyamal Mitra, which was later rendered by Kishore Kumar in 1974. (Note: Sources: "When history spun at 78 rpm: Collector preserves rare test records of Tagore, Suchitra Sen". Hindustan Times. Press Trust of India. March 6, 2026.; "When history spun at 78 rpm: Collector preserves rare test records of Tagore, Suchitra Sen". Deccan Herald. Press Trust of India. March 6, 2026.; "Preserving Melody: The Forgotten World of 78 RPM Test Records". Discourse on Development. Kolkata. Devdiscourse News Desk. March 6, 2026.)
