= Aurat Teri Yehi Kahani (1954 film) =

- Directed by: Chaturbhuj Doshi
- Produced by: Ranjit
- Starring: Bharat Bhushan; Nirupa Roy
- Music by: Bulo C Rani
- Release date: 1954

Aurat Teri Yehi Kahani is a 1954 Hindi drama film directed by Chaturbhuj Doshi and produced by Ranjit. This is the debut film of actor Chandrashekhar.

== Cast ==
- Bharat Bhushan
- Nirupa Roy
- Chandrashekhar

== Soundtrack ==
1. "Tum Chand Se Haseen Ho" – Talat Mahmood
2. "Muskurati Hai Ghata Gungunati Hai Hawa" – Asha Bhosle
3. "Diya Tune Naiya Ko Kaisa Sahara" – Asha Bhosle
4. "Kisise Kahu Mera Mann Hai Magan" – Rajkumari
5. "Raat Guzarti Jaaye" – Asha Bhosle
6. "Sada Hi Sukh Se Dur Rahi Tu" – Bulo C Rani
7. "Tujhe Apna Sapna Bana Na Saku" – Rajkumari
