= Shaktipada Rajguru =

Indian writer

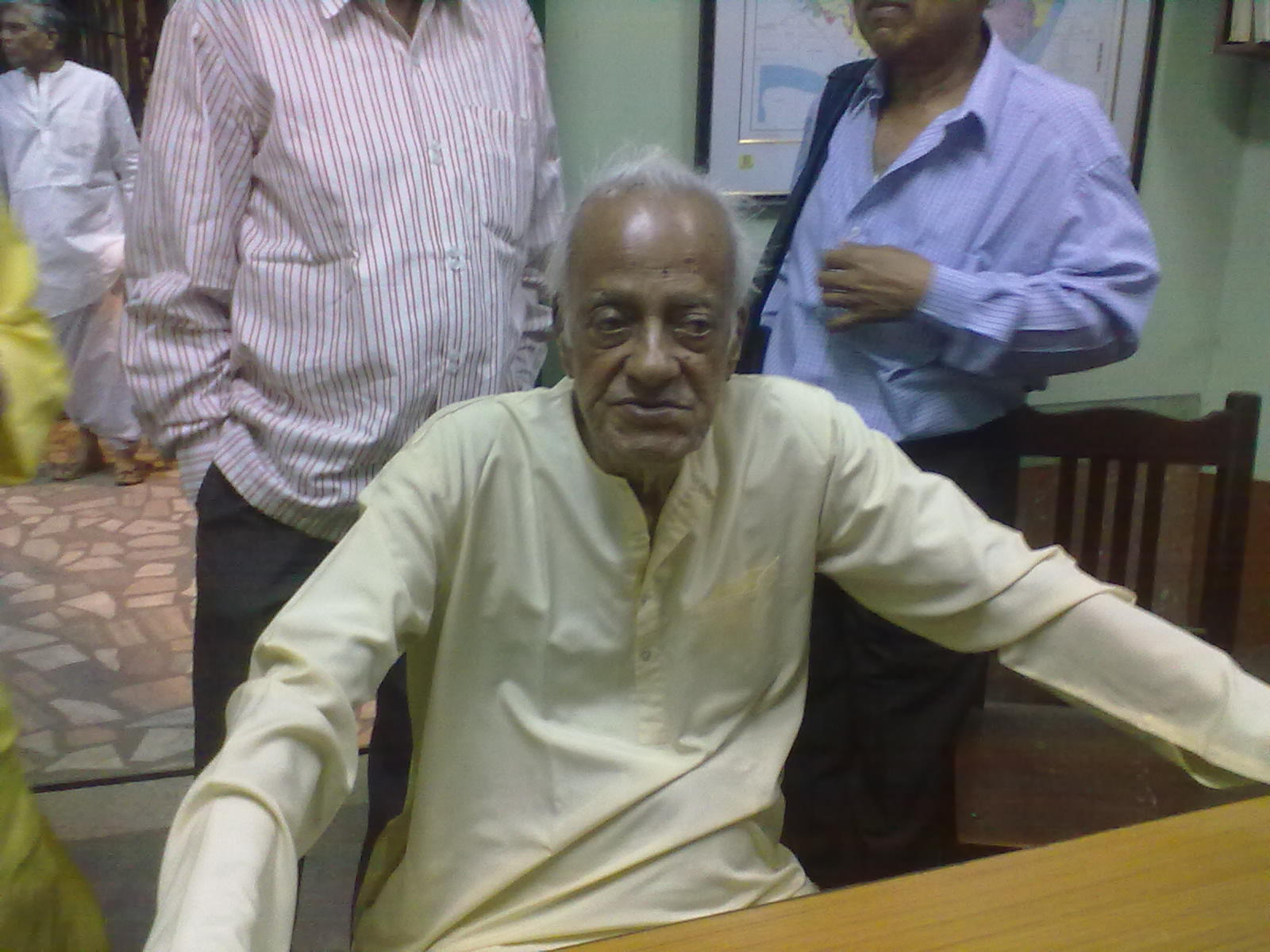
- Born: 1 February 1922; Bankura District, Bengal Presidency, British India
- Died: 12 June 2014 (aged 92); Kolkata, West Bengal, India
- Occupations: Novelist, essayist, GPO employee. Offsprings: Partha Sarathi Rajguru, Falguni Rajguru.
- Writing career
- Period: 1934–2014
- Notable work: Meghe Dhaka Tara; Amanush; Barsaat Ki Ek Raat
- Notable awards: Bibhutibhushan Award; All-India Lion's Award

Shaktipada Rajguru (Bengali: শক্তিপদ রাজগুরু) (1 February 1922 – 12 June 2014) was an Indian Bengali writer. Several of his novels have been adapted for the screen including the Ritwik Ghatak-directed Meghe Dhaka Tara and the Shakti Samanta-directed Amanush. His stories have been translated into Hindi, Tamil, and Malayalam.

== Personal life ==
Shaktipada Rajguru was born on 1 February 1922 in Gopebandi, Bankura District, in what is now West Bengal, India. His early schooling was at Pachthopi Trailakyanath Institutional School in Murshidabad. He received his bachelor's degree from Surendranath College under the University of Calcutta. He began writing in 1945 with his first novel, Dinguli Mor, which revolved around the sensitive topic of the plight of refugees. Over the course of his career he wrote over 100 novels. He died on 12 June 2014 at the age of 92.

== Writing style ==
Shaktipada Rajguru was fond of travelling and many of his novels are set in locations such as Chota Nagpur, Maharashtra, and Dandakaranya, places distant from Kolkata, where his novels are published. He was fond of describing nature in great detail and in portraying strong central characters in these locations. He cites Bibhutibhushan Bandopadhyay and Tarashankar Bandopadhyay as major influences.

== Select bibliography ==
- Meghe Dhaka Tara
- Moni Begum
- Antare antare
- Jeebon Kahini
- Anusandhan
- Amanush

== Awards ==
- The Bibhutibhushan Award for literary excellence
- All-India Lion's Award, Best screenplay for Amanush
- The Hall of Fame - Lifetime Achievement Sahityabramha Award, 2009
