= Raghavendra Chandrashekar =

Indian cricketer (born 1982)

Raghavendra Chandrashekar (born 9 July 1982) is an Indian cricketer, who played for Karnataka in first-class cricket between 2004 and 2006.
