= Hariharan Chandrashekar =

Indian economist and entrepreneur

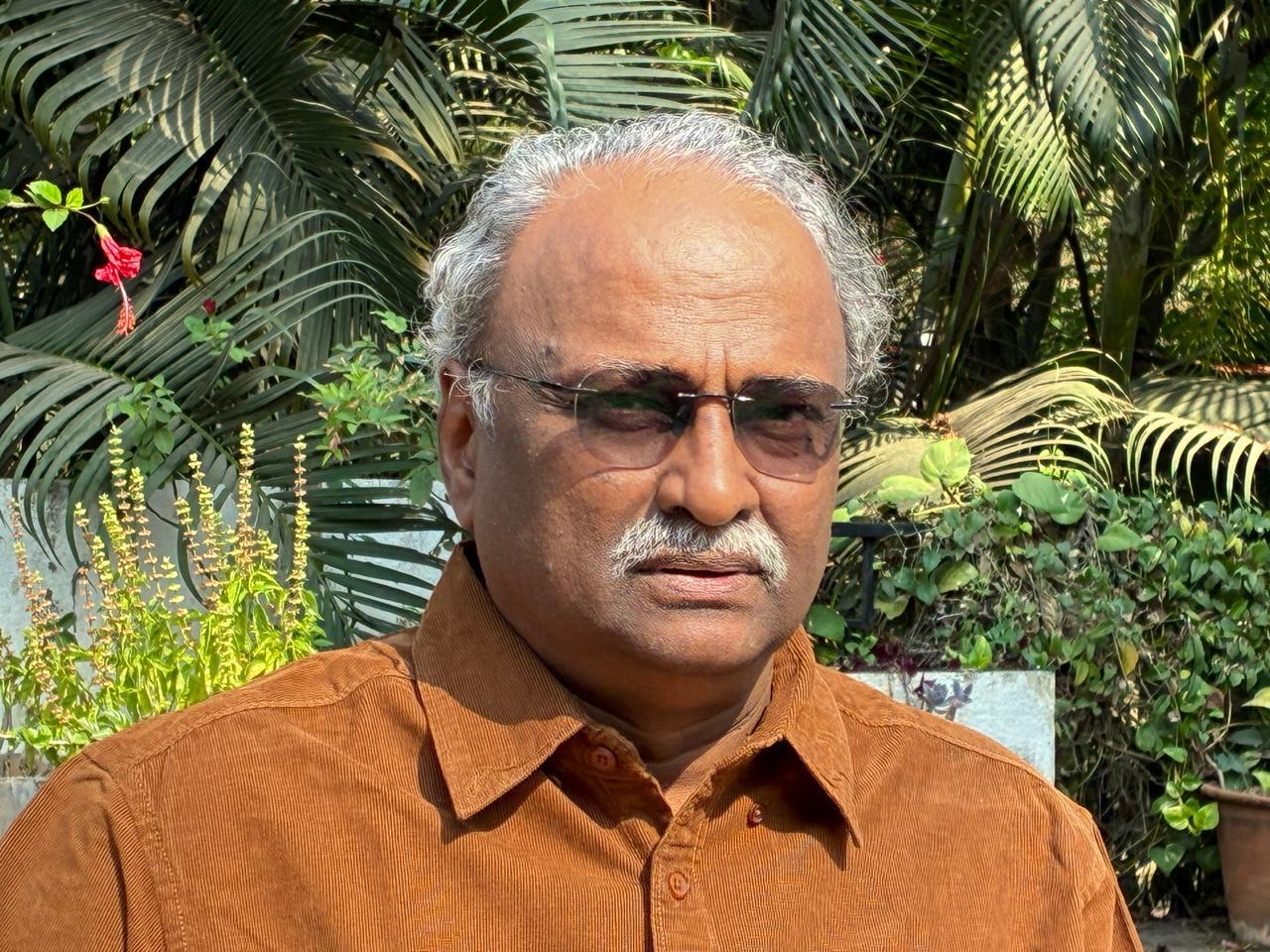
Dr. Hariharan Chandrashekar

Dr. Hariharan Chandrashekar is an Indian ecological economist, founding and presiding over urban people-led movements for urban sustainability on water and energy, a mentor for green enterprise and entrepreneurs, and enabler of industry directions on sustainability and resilience, at the building scale and the city scale.

Chandrashekar is involved with the WOW Action Forum and the multi-city WOW Partner City Network that engages with cities across South Asia, Africa and the Americas to assist communities in adopting water efficiency. WOW Mission promotes public demonstrations designed to encourage water and energy conservation. WOW is a citizen-led action for demand-side water management with voluntary compliance and creating solutions for sustainability options for saving water, money, energy and carbon.

He mentors green leadership Programmes for Indian industry and academia under the umbrella of CII IGBC and IPA as well as ISHRAE. He also guides projects across that aspire to go deep green with Net Zero Water and Energy guidelines.

He is trustee at AltTech Foundation , Bangalore. Mentor for Net Zero Solutions at a nonprofit Ecophoria. Founder Trustee at Prem Jain Memorial Trust, New Delhi. Governing Council Member at INHAF, Ahmedabad. He is also Senior Fellow at Indian Green Building Council, Hyderabad. ISHRAE , New Delhi.

His work over recent years has been marked by his drive for accelerating adoption of 'green’ solutions across the board in industrial, residential, commercial, and agricultural segments. He mentors strategy that revolves around awareness for ‘Net Zero’ solution seekers and water literacy action for schoolchildren to help build resilience for a future that needs rethinking use of natural resources. In recent years he’s been dedicated to solutioning sustainability that bolsters bottom lines of ESG with retrofit solutions for energy and water efficiency that yield high investment returns.

He is author of Tales of India's Eco Heroes, which offers stories of unsung, unhonored champions from across India's districts Book preview. As part of a trilogy, he’s working on two more books, one on water strategies for India’s future and another on the ecology and economy of India.

== Career ==
Over his 40 year career, he has led many enterprise initiatives aiming to promote and mainstream sustainability businesses with green and resilient homes under the banner of ZED Homes that he founded and nurtured for over 22 years.

Hariharan is the founder of Biodiversity Conservation India Limited, a builder of environmentally friendly homes, and of AltTech Foundation, which focuses on zero energy development and low-Carbon development and Deep Decarbonisation strategies for buildings.

He also curates and anchors a series of online education and policy dialogues under the Prem Jain Memorial Trust, and INHAF India. He is working to create over 250,000 jobs in India in collaboration with the CII, the Institute of Logistics, and the Government of Karnataka's Department of Technical Education.

Between 1991 and 2015, he helped launch and nurture three national environment-related Trusts, and six companies working in green residential buildings and the production of green products.

In 1991, he founded the Academy for Mountain Environics (now the Environics Trust). This organization works on traditional rights of people Impacted by excessive natural exploitation. In 1994, he founded Biodiversity Conservation India Limited and stepped down in 2017 to make way for new leadership. The company creates homes with deep Eco-directions for materials, and use/reuse of water, energy, and waste. In 2004, Hariharan established the AltTech Foundation (ATF), a not-for-profit organization working on energy and water solutions. Since 2018, the Foundation has worked on retrofitting a few chosen existing buildings in India to heighten Energy Efficiency.

Between 2012 and 2013, Hariharan served as technical advisor for the Karnataka Urban Water Supply & Sewerage Board. He also worked as a sustainability advisor for Bengaluru Central University in Bangalore.

He has been an itinerant resource leader for the World Resources Institute, Les Ateliers Maitrise d’Oeuvres Urbaine, ADEME, and UN Habitat.

He has consulted for the governments of Uttaranchal, Kerala and Nagaland on eco-tourism infrastructure and environment policies. He has also served as consultant for urban water supply and sanitation development as well as on practices for promoting energy efficiency in buildings and in cities, for a number of Indian and global development organizations.

He writes occasionally in national dailies and e-media on how consumers can go green at minimal cost.

== Memberships and advisory ==
- Founder member and Senior Fellow of the CII India Green Business Council national executive committee.
- Partner for the Canada India Center Carleton Univ. at Ottawa.
- Lead resource person for the Centre of Excellence for Sustainable Futures of the Govt. of Karnataka
- Editorial Advisory member, Society for Energy Engineers and Managers.
