= Venugopal Chandrasekhar =

Indian table tennis player (1957–2021)

Venugopal Chandrasekhar (18 June 1957 – 12 May 2021) was an Indian national table tennis champion and Arjuna Award winner.

Chandrasekhar died on 12 May 2021, from COVID-19 complications amid the COVID-19 pandemic in India. He was 63.

== National champion ==
Chandrasekhar was born in Tamil Nadu, India. He was an exceptionally good player of table tennis and was a national champion.

- 1970: State sub junior champion, Tamil Nadu
- 1973: State junior champion, Tamil Nadu *Three time National Champion, Table Tennis
- Bronze Medal: Asian Games
- U.S. Championship - runners up
- 1982: Entered semifinals in Commonwealth Games
- 1982: Arjuna Award as well as a lifetime achievement award.

Among his major achievements are winning the Nationals, making the semi-final of the Commonwealth championships in 1982, and helping India progress to category I from II in the 1983 Tokyo World Championships.

=== Early days ===
At the age of 12, Chandrashekhar played in the Madras Port Trust tournament. He joined the Emesor sport's council and it helped him to improve his game. The training regimen included yoga and prayers. Chandra became the Tamil Nadu state sub-junior champion in 1970. In 1973 he became Tamil Nadu's junior champion and also entered the national quarter finals. His style was flamboyant and at a time when sports coverage on TV was very limited, tickets for his matches sold in the black market in towns that traditionally patronised table tennis like Indore and Pune. Later he won the national championship.

== Tragedy: Negligence at Hospital ==
In September 1984, at the age of 25, when he was already the national champion and making his mark in international table tennis, Chandrashekhar had some pain in his knee which required a minor knee operation. His knee surgery at Chennai Apollo Hospital, went wrong on the operation table. The wrong dosage of anesthesia played its part and he suffered brain damage and lost his vision and control over his limbs. He spent 36 days in a near-coma state and eighty-one days in the hospital as part of rehabilitation. Treatment abroad was funded mainly from responses to a public appeal for funds. Members of the public, sportsmen from India and abroad, politicians and actors helped generously. The treatment abroad improved his condition somewhat.

=== Lawsuit ===
A lawsuit was filed in 1985 against the Apollo Hospitals which came to trial three years later. The medical community's omertà was broken by a few brave doctors, especially an Orthopedist from Maharashtra who helped to demolish the hospital's case. During the trial it came to light that the orthopedic surgeon of the hospital had received training in arthroscopy only in workshops in UK and not in a medical school as part of the curriculum. Eight years after the operation, and five years since the trial began, after the examination of ten witnesses and recording a thousand pages of evidence, the court delivered a verdict in favour of Chandrashekhar in mid-May 1993. The judgement said that "The plaintiff is entitled to in total, Rs 17,37,920.78 by way of special damages and general damages." A medico-legal case of this proportion was unheard of in India. A young patient had sued a hospital for negligence and had won nearly twenty lakhs. Even the cynics of the Indian judiciary were impressed. The hospital appealed against the decision, but ultimately settled after two years. During the trial years Chandrashekhar continued his treatment in India and abroad and worked at the State Bank of India to support himself. He was a gold medalist of Madras University (economics) was to work as a cashier. A fight which he felt would not have been necessary had "human spirit prevailed over ego".

== Recovery ==
Chandrasekhar has made a good recovery physically. He has regained 70% of his vision, though reading small letters on the computer and driving at night were still a problem.

Chandrasekhar was one of the sports professionals in India to ask for appearance money and also actively sought to improve players' working conditions. He wrote a column on table tennis, "TopSpin", for The Telegraph and also covered tournaments for newspapers after his operation.

From a person equipped with razor sharp reflexes needed to play a game in which the ball typically travels at 100 km/h or more, Chandrasekhar became a person who did not have normal peripheral vision and couldn't see beyond a few feet; he suffered from a condition called nystagmus - his eyeballs could not focus. A bulb, for instance, appeared as a series of points of light. Chandra ran an academy for young table tennis players and was married to Mala. They have a son, Sanjay.

== Autobiography ==
Chandrashekhar wrote, with the help of Seetha Srikanth, an autobiography, My fightback from Death's door, published by Eastwest books, Chennai, in 2006.

There are times when I stumble on the footpath, and people have thought that I was drunk.

That is when it hurts for it is not my fault. Then I look at the computer in my office and cannot read the small letters. To be lesser than a normal human being is what pains me the most. But I know I have to carry on. - V. Chandrasekhar.
