= Kamleshwar (writer) =

Indian writer and screenwriter (1932–2007)

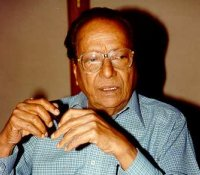
- Born: Kamleshwar Prasad Saxena; 6 January 1932; Mainpuri, United Provinces, British India
- Died: 27 January 2007 (aged 75); Faridabad, Haryana, India
- Education: University of Allahabad
- Occupations: Writer, screenwriter and critic
- Writing career
- Pen name: Kamleshwar
- Period: 1954–2006
- Genres: Novel, short story, essay, screenplay
- Notable work: Kitne Pakistan (2000)
- Notable awards: Sahitya Akademi Award (2003); Padma Bhushan (2005)
- Movement: Nayi Kahani

Kamleshwar Prasad Saxena (6 January 1932 – 27 January 2007), known mononymously as Kamleshwar, was a 20th-century Indian writer who wrote in Hindi. He also worked as a screenwriter for Indian films and television industry. Among his most well-known works are the films Aandhi, Mausam, Chhoti Si Baat and Rang Birangi. He was awarded the 2003 Sahitya Akademi Award for his Hindi novel Kitne Pakistan (translated in English as Partitions), and the Padma Bhushan in 2005.

He is considered a part of the league of Hindi writers like Mohan Rakesh, Nirmal Verma, Rajendra Yadav and Bhisham Sahni, who left the old pre-independence literary preoccupations and presented the new sensibilities that reflected new moorings of a post-independence India, thus launching the Hindi literature's Nayi Kahani ("New Story") movement in the 1950s.

== Biography ==
=== Early life and education ===
Kamleshwar Prasad Saxena was born in the Mainpuri district of Uttar Pradesh, India, where he spent his early years. Kamleshwar's first story, "Comrade", was published in 1948.

Later he did his graduation and followed by a master's degree in Hindi literature from the University of Allahabad. His first novel, Badnam Gali (Cursed Lane), was published while he was still a student; he later started his literary career in Allahabad itself.

== Career ==
In his early days, he worked as a proofreader, growing up to become, the editor of 'Vihan', literary magazine in the late 1950s. This was followed by editorship of many Hindi magazines, like 'Nayi Kahaniyan' (1963–66), 'Sarika' (1967–78), 'Katha Yatra' (1978–79), 'Ganga' (1984–88) and weeklies, 'lngit' (1961–63) and 'Shree Varsha' (1979–80), besides this, he also remained the editor of Hindi dailies, 'Dainik Jagaran' (1990–1992), and 'Dainik Bhaskar' (1996–2002), and helped revive the Hindi magazine, 'Sarika', as its editor by bringing focus on new and emerging voices of modern India, an effort which reflected his encouragement to Marathi Dalit writers and Bohra Muslim litterateurs, thus opening new vistas for Hindi readers.

...once upon a time, trees provided shelter from the sun and the wind to human homes. Now, the trees have become used to growing in the shadows of tall concrete buildings.

— Kamleshwar, Kitne Pakistan

Kamleshwar became famous for his short stories, and some other works, which depicted the contemporary life in a vivid style of presentation. With the publication of his story, 'Raja Nirbansiya' (1957), he was immediately placed in league of leading writers of his times. In his prolific career, spanning four decades, he wrote over three hundred stories, including, "Maans Ka Dariya", "Neeli Jheel" and "Kasbe Ka Aadmi", published over ten collections of short stories, ten novels most prominent among them being, Ek Sadak Sattawan Galiyan, Laute Huye Musafir, Kaali Aandhi, Aagami Ateet, Registan and Kitne Pakistan, apart from 35 other literary works in different genres ranging from literary criticism, travelogue, memoirs, to socio-cultural commentary.

=== Films ===
He moved to Bombay in the 1970s and started writing scripts and dialogues for Hindi films, in the next decade or so, he worked for over 75 feature films, which include films like Gulzar's Aandhi, based on his novel Kaali Aandhi, Mausam; Basu Chatterjee, Chhoti Si Baat, Rang Birangi and Ravi Chopra's thriller, The Burning Train. In fact, reminiscing his works noted poet-director, Gulzar said that "in 'Kitne Pakistan'... there is a description where a handkerchief falls off the bridge; I always used to tell him that I could write a complete short story on this one line only.". He won the 1979 Filmfare Award for Best Screenplay for Pati Patni Aur Woh, directed by B. R. Chopra.

=== Television ===
By the late 1970s, he had made his first short TV film the "Jamuna Bazar", near river Yamuna in Delhi, and soon switched to television script-writing, and eventually became the 'Additional Director General' of Doordarshan, India's national television channel, (1980–82), during his tenure, in a matter of 24 months, the entire nation was connected with television network.

Over the years, he wrote stories in ten TV serials including Chandrakanta, Aakash Ganga, Yug and Betal Pachisi, as well as popular serials based on literary works such as Darpan and Ek Kahani. He hosted a popular talk show on Doordarshan, Parikrama, started a weekly literary show, Patrika, and also produced and directed several television programs and investigative documentaries on social and political issues for Doordarshan.

=== Later years ===
He was awarded the 2003 Sahitya Akademi Award for his novel based on the Partition of India in 1947, Kitne Pakistan (literally How Many Pakistans? but translated in English as Partitions), which explored the way nations fracture, through an allegorical court trial, wherein historical and political figures are present as witnesses, and the Padma Bhushan in 2005.

He died on 27 January 2007 at Faridabad following a heart attack, after being in poor health for several years.

A collection of his short stories in English translation, Not Flowers of Henna, was released in 2007.

== Literary works ==
- Aagami Atit
- Aaj Ke Prasiddh Shayar Shaharyar
- Aazadi Mubarak
- Amma
- Anbita Vyatit
- Ankho Dekha Pakistan
- Atmakatha (3 Parts)
- Bayaan
- Bharatmata Gramvasini
- Chandrakanta ( Especially re-written by him for the popular TV serial)
- Dak Bangla
- Des-Pardes
- Ek Sarak Sattavan Galiyan
- George Pancham Ki Naak
- Gulmohar Phir Khilega
- Hindustan Hamara
- Hindustani Gazalein
- Jalti Hui Nadi (Part 3)
- Jinda Murde(kahani sangrah)
- Jo Maine Jiya (Part 1)
- Kahani Ki Teesri Duniya
- Kali Aandhi
- Kamleshwar Kee Shreshtha Kahaniyan
- Kasbe Ka Aadmi
- Kashmir Rat Ke Baad
- Katha Prasthan
- Khoyi Hui Dishayein
- Kitne Pakistan(novel)
- Kohra
- Maans Ka Dariya
- Mati Ho Gai Sona
- Mehfil
- Mere Hamsafar
- Meri Priya Kahaniyan
- Parikrama
- Pati Patni Aur Vah
- Raja Nirbansiya
- Registan
- Samagra Kahaniyan
- Samagra Upanyas (All of his 10 novels in one collection)
- Samudra Mein Khoya Aadmi
- Solah chaton wala ghar
- Subah Dopahar Sham
- Swatantryottar Hindi Kahaniyan
- Teesra Aadmi
- Tumhara Kamleshwar
- Vahi Baat
- Yadon Ke Chirag (Part 2)

== Bibliography ==
- The Street with Fifty-Seven Lanes
- Not Flowers of Henna
- Kitne Pakistan, Rajpal & Sons, 2000. (Reprint: 2004, ISBN 81-7028-320-5)
- Partitions, Penguin Books, 2006. ISBN 0-14-400099-7 (Reprint: 2008, ISBN 978-0-14-306370-4; Presentation)
- "George Pancham ki Naak". NCERT.

== Filmography ==
- Sara Akash (1969) (dialogue)
- Badnam Basti (1971) (story)
- Aandhi (1975) (story)
- Mausam (1975) (story)
- Amanush (1975) (dialogue)
- Chhoti Si Baat (1976) (dialogue & screenplay)
- Anand Ashram (1977) (dialogue)
- Pati Patni Aur Woh (1978) (dialogue)
- The Burning Train (1980) (dialogue & screenplay)
- Ram Balram (1980) (dialogue & screenplay)
- Saajan Ki Saheli (1980) (dialogue & screenplay)
- Souten (1983) (dialogue)
- Rang Birangi (1983) (story)
- Yeh Desh (1984) (dialogue)
- Laila (1984) (dialogue & screenplay)
- Preeti (1986) (dialogue & screenplay)
- Souten Ki Beti (1989) (dialogue)
