= M. G. Hashmat =

Film songs writer from India

M. G. Hashmat was a lyricist and script writer in Indian films. He worked mostly in Bollywood movies as songwriter. He won BFJA Awards for Best Lyricist in 1975 and was nominated for Filmfare Award for Best Lyricist in 1975 for the Kishore Kumar popular song "Mera Jeevan Kora Kagaz" from the movie Kora Kagaz (1974).

He has written 202 film songs in 51 Hindi films. He is also known as dialogue writer, his work was in simple word near to daily life.He wrote the dialogue of Kora Kagaz movie 1973.

== Discography ==
- Bachche Mere Saathi (1972)
- Do Chattane (1974)
- Jeevan Sangram (1974)
- Kora Kagaz (1974) (He won the 'Best Lyricist' BFJA Award in 1975)
- Do Jhoot (1975)
- Ranga Khush (1975)
- Sanyasi (1975)
- Uljhan (1975)
- Fauji (1976)
- Mera Jeevan (1976)
- Sankoch (1976)
- Tapasya (1976)
- Yaari Zindabad (1976)
- Aaj Ka Yeh Ghar (1977)
- Duniyadaari (1977)
- Pandit Aur Pathan (1977)
- Veeru Ustad (1977)
- Do Musafir (1978)
- Trishna (1978)
- Vishnawanath (1978)
- Atmaram (1979)
- Habari (1979)
- Humkadam (1980)
- Teen Eekay (1980)
- Naari (1981)
- Bheegi Palkein (1982)
- Siskiyan (1982)
- Haadsa (1983)
- Bandhe Honth (1984)
- Paapi Pet Ka Sawaal Hai (1984)
- Ram Ki Ganga (1984)
- Awara Baap (1985)
- Paisa Yeh Paisa (1985)
- Samay Ki Dhara (1986)
- Swarthi (1986)
- Insaaf Ki Jung (1988)
- Naam Hai Krishna (1988)
- Tadap Aisi Bhi Hoti Hai (1988)
- Prem Jaal (1989)
- Honeymoon (1992)
- Phoolwati (1992)
- Bhagyawaan (1993)
- Pyaar Ka Taraana (1993)
- Gangster (1994)
- Hulchul (1995)
- Kala Sach (1995)
- The Gambler (1995)
- Hind Ko Beti (1996)
- Jagannath (1996)
- Miss 420 (1998)
- Prem Aggan (1998)
- Hote Hote Pyaar Ho Gaya (1999)

== Awards and nominations ==
- Filmfare Award for Best Lyricist – 1974 for "Mera Jeevan Kora Kagaz" (nominated)
- BFJA Awards for Best Lyricist - 1975 (won)
