= Khushboo (1975 film) =

- Movie Poster
- Directed by: Gulzar
- Written by: Gulzar (dialogues)
- Screenplay by: Gulzar; D.N. Mukherjee; Bhushan Banmali
- Story by: Shri Sarat Chandra Chatterjee
- Based on: Pandit Mashai (1951 film)
- Produced by: Prasan Kapoor; Jeetendra (presents)
- Starring: Jeetendra; Hema Malini
- Cinematography: K Vaikunth
- Edited by: Khanti Bhai Pandya
- Music by: R. D. Burman
- Production company: Tirupati Pictures
- Release date: 8 May 1975
- Running time: 133 minutes
- Country: India
- Language: Hindi

Khushboo (transl. Aroma) is a 1975 Hindi-language drama film, produced by Prasan Kapoor under the Tirupati Pictures banner, presented by Jeetendra and directed by Gulzar. It stars Jeetendra, Hema Malini and music composed by R. D. Burman. The film is a remake of the 1951 Bengali film Pandit Mashai, which itself was based on Sharat Chandra Chattopadhyay's novel of the same name.

== Plot ==
Kusum, as a child, marries Vrindavan. After some time, her father dies in a riot, and blame erroneously comes to Vrindavan's father. Due to this, Vrindavan's father rejects Kusum to be his daughter-in-law. Kusum, along with her brother and mother, moves to a different village away from Vrindavan's family. Now they grow up, and Kusum considers herself as the wife of Vrindavan and refuses to marry anyone else. Eventually, her mother dies, and her brother Kunj stays single as he doesn't want to marry until he sends his sister to her in-laws. On the other side, Vrindavan's father dies, and he becomes a doctor. Oblivious to Kusum's feelings, he goes on to marry another girl, Lakhi, who was also a victim of child marriage and has no one now. They have a son, Charan, and Lakhi dies after some time due to illness. He moves to his village and starts a practice there. Once, he happens to visit a wealthy patient in Kusum's village where Kusum recognizes him, though he fails to as he only knows her pet name, not real name, gradually, they come closer, and Vrindavan's mother is happy to accept Kusum as her daughter-in-law. But misunderstandings develop because Kusum considers them insensitive as they not only forgot what they had done to her family but also take her for granted now. But Vrindavan, having a soft corner for her, still wishes that she would come to him. Kusum grows close to his son Charan and keeps him with her during the endemic in Vrindavan's village. Finally, Vrindavan and Kusum can overcome egoistic barriers and unite with the blessings of her brother, Vrindavan's mother, and little Charan.

== Cast ==
- Jeetendra as Dr. Brindaban
- Hema Malini as Kusum
- Sharmila Tagore as Lakhi
- Asrani as Kunj
- Om Shivpuri as Brindaban's father
- Chandrima Bhaduri as Chaudhrain
- Dev Kishan as Munim
- Sudhir Thakkar as Sudhir
- Durga Khote as Brindaban's mother
- Farida Jalal as Manno
- Sarika as Kali
- Leela Mishra as Kusum's mother
- Master Raju as Charan (Brindaban's son)

== Awards ==
At the 23rd Filmfare Awards, the film received two nominations - Kishore Kumar as Best Playback Singer, Male for O Maajhi Re and Hema Malini as Best Actress.

== Soundtrack ==
The music of the film was by R. D. Burman, and the lyrics were by Gulzar. The song "O Majhi Re Apna Kinara" went on to be used in the Malaysian film Rabun.

#	Title	Singer(s)
1	"O Majhi Re Apna Kinara"	Kishore Kumar
2	"Do Nainon Mein Ansoo Bhare Hai"	Lata Mangeshkar
3	"Ghar Jayegi Tar Jayegi"	Asha Bhosle
4	"Bechara Dil Kya Kare"	Asha Bhosle
