= List of Hindi films of 1976 =

A list of films produced by the Bollywood film industry based in Mumbai in 1976:

== Highest-grossing films ==
These are the highest-grossing Hindi films of 1976. Gross collection figures are worldwide, unless otherwise noted.

Rank	Title	Gross collection	Notes
1	Nagin	₹9.38 crore	
2	Dus Numbri	₹9 crore	Domestic gross
3	Laila Majnu	₹8.50 crore	Domestic gross
4	Kalicharan	₹7.68 crore	
5	Maa	₹6.55 crore	
6	Bairaag	₹6.54 crore	
7	Hera Pheri	₹6 crore	Domestic gross
8	Charas	₹5.50 crore	Domestic gross
9	Shankar Dada	₹5.39 crore	
10	Fakira	₹5 crore	Domestic gross

== A-Z ==
Title	Director	Cast	Genre	Sources
Aaj Ka Mahaatma	Kundan Kumar	Randhir Kapoor, Rekha, Ranjeet, Bindu	Romantic Action	
Aaj Ka Ye Ghar	Surendra Shailaj	Shriram Lagoo, Helen, Lalita Pawar		
Aap Beati	Mohan Kumar	Shashi Kapoor, Hema Malini, Ashok Kumar, Sujit Kumar, Aruna Irani	Drama	
Aarambh	Gyan Kumar	Kishore Namit Kapoor, Saira Banu, Ravi Kumar	Drama	
Adalat	Narendra Bedi	Amitabh Bachchan, Waheeda Rehman, Neetu Singh	Action	
Ali Baba	Mohammed Hussain	Dhara Singh, Satish Kaul, Radha Saluja, Helen		
Arjun Pandit	Hrishikesh Mukherjee	Sanjeev Kumar, Vinod Mehra, Shabana Azmi	Drama	
Bairaag	Asit Sen	Dilip Kumar, Saira Banu, Leena Chandavarkar	Drama	
Bajrangbali	Chandrakant	Biswajeet, Moushumi Chatterjee, Shashi Kapoor	Mythology	
Balika Badhu	Tarun Majumdar	Sachin, Rajni Sharma, Asrani	Comedy, Drama	
Barood	Pramod Chakravorty	Rishi Kapoor, Reena Roy, Shoma Anand, Sujit Kumar	Action	
Bhala Manus	Vishwamitra Gokel	Randhir Kapoor, Neetu Singh, Asrani, Aruna Irani		
Bhanwar	Bhappi Sonie	Ashok Kumar, Parveen Babi, Randhir Kapoor		
Bullet	Vijay Anand	Dev Anand, Shriram Lagoo, Parveen Babi	Action	
Bundal Baaz	Shammi Kapoor	Rajesh Khanna, Sulakshana Pandit, Shammi Kapoor	Fantasy	
Chalte Chalte	Sunder Dar	Simi Garewal, Vishal Anand	Thriller	Music by Bappi Lahiri
Charas	Ramanand Sagar	Dharmendra, Hema Malini	Action Thriller	
Chhoti Si Baat	Basu Chatterjee	Ashok Kumar, Vidya Sinha, Amol Palekar	Romance, Comedy	
Chitchor	Basu Chatterjee	Amol Palekar, Zarina Wahab, Vijayendra Ghatge, Dina Pathak	Romance	
Deewaangee	Samir Ganguly	Shashi Kapoor, Zeenat Aman	Drama	
Do Anjaane	Dulal Guha	Amitabh Bachchan, Rekha, Prem Chopra	Drama	
Do Khiladi	Jugal Kishore	Jani Badu, Vinod Mehra		
Do Ladkiyan	Kotayya Pratyagatma	Sanjeev Kumar, Mala Sinha		
Dus Numbri	Madan Mohla	Manoj Kumar, Hema Malini, Premnath, Pran	Action	
Ek Se Badhkar Ek	Brij	Ashok Kumar, Raj Kumar, Navin Nischol, Sharmila Tagore	Action	
Fakira	C. P. Dixit	Shashi Kapoor, Shabana Azmi, Danny Denzongpa	Action	
Ginny Aur Johnny	Mehmood	Mehmood, Nutan, Helen, Hema Malini	Comedy, Drama	
Gumrah	Manik Prem	Danny Denzongpa, Reena Roy		
Hera Pheri	Prakash Mehra	Amitabh Bachchan, Vinod Khanna, Saira Banu, Sulakshana Pandit	Crime Drama	
Jaaneman	Chetan Anand	Dev Anand, Hema Malini, Premnath	Action	
Jai Jagat Janani	K.S.Gopalakrishnan	Gemini Ganesan, Jayalalithaa		
Jeevan Jyoti	Murugan Kumaran	Vijay Arora, Bindiya Goswami	Drama	
Kabeela	Bholu Khosla	Feroz Khan, Rekha, Bindu	Drama	
Kabhi Kabhie	Yash Chopra	Amitabh Bachchan, Shashi Kapoor, Raakhee, Rishi Kapoor, Waheeda Rehman, Neetu Singh	Romance	
Kadambari	H. K. Verma	Vijay Arora, Shabana Azmi, Chand Usmani	Drama	
Kalicharan	Subhash Ghai	Shatrughan Sinha, Reena Roy, Premnath	Action	
Khaan Dost	Dulal Guha	Shatrughan Sinha, Raj Kapoor, Yogeeta Bali, Mithu Mukherjee	Action	
Khalifa	Prakash Mehra	Randhir Kapoor, Rekha, Pran	Drama	
Khamma Mara Veera	Shantilal Soni	Sachin Pilgaonkar, Sarika	Drama	
Koi Jeeta Koi Haara	Samir Ganguly	Shashi Kapoor, Saira Banu		
Lagaam	Desh Gautam	Yogeeta Bali, Bindu, Prem Chopra, C. S. Dubey		
Laila Majnu	H. S. Rawail	Rishi Kapoor, Ranjeeta, Danny Dengzongpa	Drama	
Maa	M. A. Thirumugam	Dharmendra, Hema Malini	Family Drama	
Maha Chor	Narendra Bedi	Rajesh Khanna, Neetu Singh	Action, Comedy	
Manthan	Shyam Benegal	Naseeruddin Shah, Smita Patil, Girish Karnad, Amrish Puri	Drama	
Mazdoor Zindabaad	Naresh Kumar HN	Randhir Kapoor, Parveen Babi		
Mehbooba	Shakti Samanta	Rajesh Khanna, Hema Malini, Yogeeta Bali, Prem Chopra	Romance, Drama	
Mera Jiwan	Bindoo Shukla	Vidya Sinha, Satyen Kappu	Drama	
Mrigayaa	Mrinal Sen	Mithun Chakraborty, Mamata Shankar, Anoop Kumar	Drama	
Murder at Monkey Hill	Vidhu Vinod Chopra	Vidhu Vinod Chopra, Anjali Paigankar		
Naach Uthe Sansaar	Yakub Hussain Rizvi	Shashi Kapoor, Hema Malini	Romance	
Nagin	Raj Kumar Kohli	Sunil Dutt, Feroz Khan, Sanjay Khan, Jeetendra, Kabir Bedi, Vinod Mehra, Rekha, Mumtaz, Reena Roy, Ranjeet	Horror	
Nehle Pe Dehla	Raj Khosla	Sunil Dutt, Vinod Khanna, Saira Banu	Drama	
Phool Aur Insaan	Kartar Singh	Abhi Bhattacharya, Kartar Singh, Leela Mishra, moolchand	Drama, Romanc	Music by Surinder Kohli
Raees	Vishnu Raaje	Yogeeta Bali, Kiran Kumar	Drama	
Rakhi Aur Rifle	Radhakant	Dara Singh, Leela Mishra	Action	
Raksha Bandhan	Shantilal Soni	Sachin, Sarika, Jalal Agha	Drama	
Rangila Ratan	S. Ramanathan	Rishi Kapoor, Parveen Babi, Ashok Kumar	Action	
Sabse Bada Rupaiya	S. Ramanathan	Vinod Mehra, Moushumi Chatterjee, Mehmood	Drama	
Sajjo Rani	Govind Saraiya	Ramesh Deo, Ramesh Sharma, Rehana Sultan		
Sangat	Basu Bhattarcharya	Rakesh Pandey, Kajri, Satyen Kapoor		
Sangram	Harmesh Malhotra	Shatrughan Sinha, Reena Roy	Drama, Action	
Sawa Lakh Se Ek Ladaun	Dara Singh	Dara Singh, Rajesh Khanna, Yogeeta Bali	Period Drama	
Suntan	Mohan Segal	Jeetendra, Rekha, Ashok Kumar	Drama	
Shahi Lutera	Mohammed Hussain	Darah Singh, Hina Kausar, Jagdeep, Asha Sackdev	Drama	
Shankar Dada	Shibu Mitra	Shashi Kapoor, Neetu Singh, Pran		
Shankar Shambhu	Chand	Feroz Khan, Vinod Khanna, Sulakshana Pandit.	Action	
Shaque	Aruna-Vikas	Vinod Khanna, Shabana Azmi	Action	
Sharafat Chod Di Maine	Jagdev Bhambri	Feroz Khan, Hema Malini	Drama	
Sikander	Sai Paranjape	Veeni Paranjape joglekar, Khulbushan Kharbhanda		
Sita Kalyanam	Bapu	Jaya Prada, Gummadi	Mythological	
Tapasya	Anil Ganguly	Raakhee, Parikshit Sahni	Romance, Drama	
Udhar Ka Sindur	L. V. Prasad	Jeetendra, Reena Roy	Drama	
Veer Bhagdavalo	Babubhai Mistry	Arvind Trivedi, Upendra Trivedi, Snehalata		
Zamane Se Poocho	Abrar Alvi	Ambrish Kapadia, Kader Khan, Murad		
Zid	Vijay	Nutan, Sarika, Sachin		
Zindagi	Ravi Tandon	Sanjeev Kumar, Vinod Mehra, Mala Sinha, Moushumi Chatterjee, Aruna Irani, A. K. Hangal, Deven Verma	Drama	

== See also ==
- List of Hindi films of 1975
- List of Hindi films of 1977
