= Filmfare Award for Best Director =

Bollywood Filmfare Award for Best Director

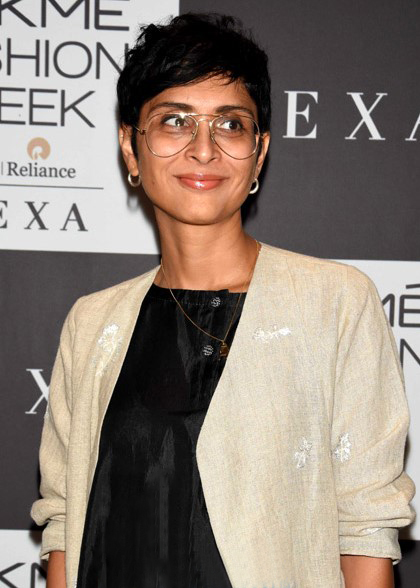
- The 2025 recipient: Kiran Rao for Laapataa Ladies
- Awarded for: Best Director
- Country: India
- Presented by: Filmfare
- First award: Bimal Roy, Do Bigha Zamin (1954)
- Currently held by: Kiran Rao, Laapataa Ladies (2025)
- Website: Filmfare Awards

The Filmfare Best Director Award is one of the main awards given by the annual Filmfare Awards to recognise directors working in Hindi cinema. It was first presented in 1954 in the inaugural year.

== Superlatives ==
Achievement	Director	Record
Most awards	Bimal Roy	7
Most nominations	Yash Chopra	12
Most consecutive wins	Bimal Roy (1954–1956); (1959–1961)	3
Most nominations without a Win	Mahesh Bhatt	6
Youngest winner	Aditya Chopra	age 24
Oldest winner	Vidhu Vinod Chopra	age 71

Bimal Roy has the record of winning most awards (7) and the distinction of winning the award thrice in a row, on 2 separate occasions (1954–1956 and 1959–1961). He also won the award whenever he was nominated (7/7). Sanjay Leela Bhansali has received the award 5 times, Yash Chopra and Raj Kapoor has received the award 4 times each.

Yash Chopra received 12 nominations, Sanjay Leela Bhansali has received 8 nominations, while Raj Kapoor has received 6 nominations. Mahesh Bhatt was nominated thrice in a row (1984–1986). However, he hasn't received any award even after having been nominated 6 times. Also, no director has ever won if one has been nominated twice in the same year – Gulzar in 1974 (for Achanak and Koshish), Basu Chatterjee in 1977 (for Chhoti Si Baat and Chitchor) and Hrishikesh Mukherjee in 1980 (for Gol Maal and Jurmana).

Sai Paranjpye was the first of 5 women to have won this award, the second being Zoya Akhtar, the third being Ashwiny Iyer Tiwari, the fourth being Meghna Gulzar and the fifth being Kiran Rao. Sai Paranjpye won it for Sparsh in 1985. Paranjpye had earlier been nominated for Chashme Buddoor in 1982. Zoya Akhtar won it for Zindagi Na Milegi Dobara in 2012. Ashwiny Iyer Tiwari won it for Bareilly Ki Barfi in 2018 and Meghna Gulzar won it in for Raazi in 2019, after previously being nominated in 2016 for Talvar. Akhtar won the award again for Gully Boy in 2020, thus becoming the only woman to win the award twice. Kiran Rao won the award for Laapataa Ladies in 2025. Other women directors to have been nominated are Mira Nair for Salaam Bombay! in 1990, Farah Khan for Main Hoon Na in 2005 and for Om Shanti Om in 2008, Gauri Shinde for English Vinglish in 2013 and Seema Pahwa for Ramprasad Ki Tehrvi in 2022.

Rajkumar Santoshi remains the only director to have won the award for his first two films – for Ghayal in 1991 and for Damini in 1994.

Nitesh Tiwari and Ashwiny Iyer Tiwari are the only married couple to win the award. Additionally, they won the award in consecutive years – the former won the award for Dangal in 2017 and the latter won the award for Bareilly Ki Barfi in 2018.

Only once have two siblings been nominated in the same year; Zoya Akhtar for Zindagi Na Milegi Dobara and Farhan Akhtar for Don 2 in 2012, with Zoya winning the category.

== Multiple wins and nominations ==
The following Directors have received multiple Best Director nominations. The list is sorted by the number of total awards (with the number of total nominations listed in parentheses).

- 7 : Bimal Roy (7)
- 5 : Sanjay Leela Bhansali (8)
- 4 : Yash Chopra (12)
- 4 : Raj Kapoor (6)
- 2 : Rakesh Roshan (5)
- 2 : Karan Johar (6)
- 2 : Rajkumar Santoshi (5)
- 2 : Vidhu Vinod Chopra (4)
- 2 : Ashutosh Gowariker (3)
- 2 : Manoj Kumar (3)
- 2 : Zoya Akhtar (2)
- 2 : Govind Nihalani (2)
- 2 : Rakeysh Omprakash Mehra (2)
- 1 : Subhash Ghai (6)
- 1 : Gulzar (6)
- 1 : B. R. Chopra (5)
- 1 : Rajkumar Hirani (5)
- 1 : Mansoor Khan (4)
- 1 : Shyam Benegal (3)
- 1 : Basu Chatterjee (3)
- 1 : Aditya Chopra (3)
- 1 : Sohanlal Kanwar (3)
- 1 : Sooraj Barjatya (3)
- 1 : Mukul S. Anand (2)
- 1 : J. P. Dutta (2)
- 1 : Shekhar Kapur (2)
- 1 : Mehboob Khan (2)
- 1 : Sai Paranjpye (2)
- 1 : Ramanand Sagar (2)
- 1 : Asit Sen (2)
- 1 : V. Shantaram (2)
- 1 : Meghna Gulzar (2)
- 1 : Nitesh Tiwari (2)
- 1 : Kunal Kohli (1)
- 1 : Sujoy Ghosh (1)
- 1 : Aamir Khan (1)
- 1 : Vikas Bahl (1)
- 1 : Ashwiny Iyer Tiwari (1)
- 1 : Om Raut (1)
- 1 : Vijay Anand (1)
- 1 : Abrar Alvi (1)
- 1 : Satyajit Ray (1)
- 1 : Muzaffar Ali (1)
- 1 : Kiran Rao (1)
- 0 : Mahesh Bhatt (6)
- 0 : Hrishikesh Mukherjee (5)
- 0 : Ram Gopal Varma (5)
- 0 : Shoojit Sircar (4)
- 0 : Ramesh Sippy (3)
- 0 : Imtiaz Ali (3)
- 0 : Anurag Kashyap (3)
- 0 : Anurag Basu (3)
- 0 : Vishal Bhardwaj (3)
- 0 : Ayan Mukerji (3)
- 0 : Farhan Akhtar (3)
- 0 : Shakti Samanta (3)
- 0 : Prakash Mehra (2)
- 0 : Indra Kumar (2)
- 0 : Rajiv Rai (2)
- 0 : Dharmesh Darshan (2)
- 0 : Abbas–Mustan (2)
- 0 : Abhishek Kapoor (2)
- 0 : Aanand L. Rai (2)
- 0 : Farah Khan (2)
- 0 : Kabir Khan (2)
- 0 : Madhur Bhandarkar (2)
- 0 : Sriram Raghavan (2)
- 0 : L. V. Prasad (2)
- 0 : Raj Khosla (2)
- 0 : David Dhawan (2)
- 0 : Vikram Bhatt (2)
- 0 : Rahul Rawail (2)
- 0 : Siddharth Anand (2)
- 0 : Anees Bazmee (2)
- 0 : Amar Kaushik (2)

== Winners and nominees ==
In the list below, the winner of the award for each year is shown first, followed by the other nominees. The films are listed by the years when the award was presented. The announcing of nominations became regular after 1959.

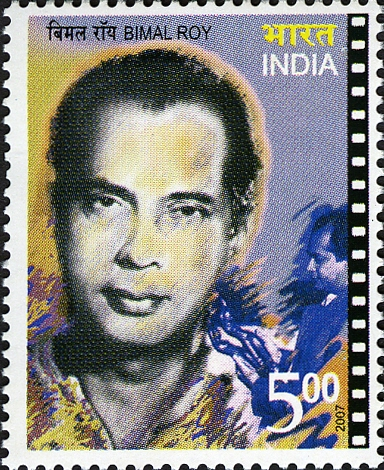
The first and most (7 times) winner: Bimal Roy

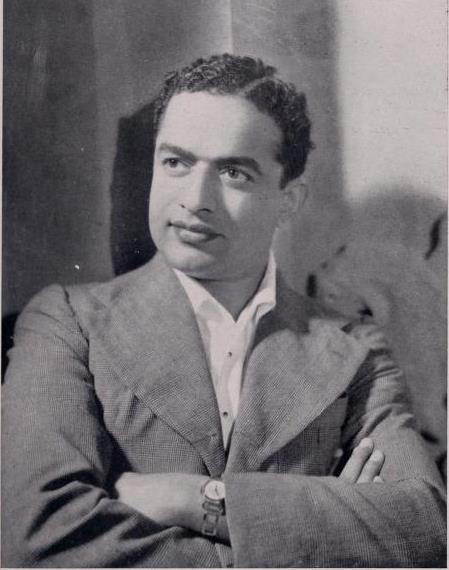
V. Shantaram won for Jhanak Jhanak Payal Baaje (1956)

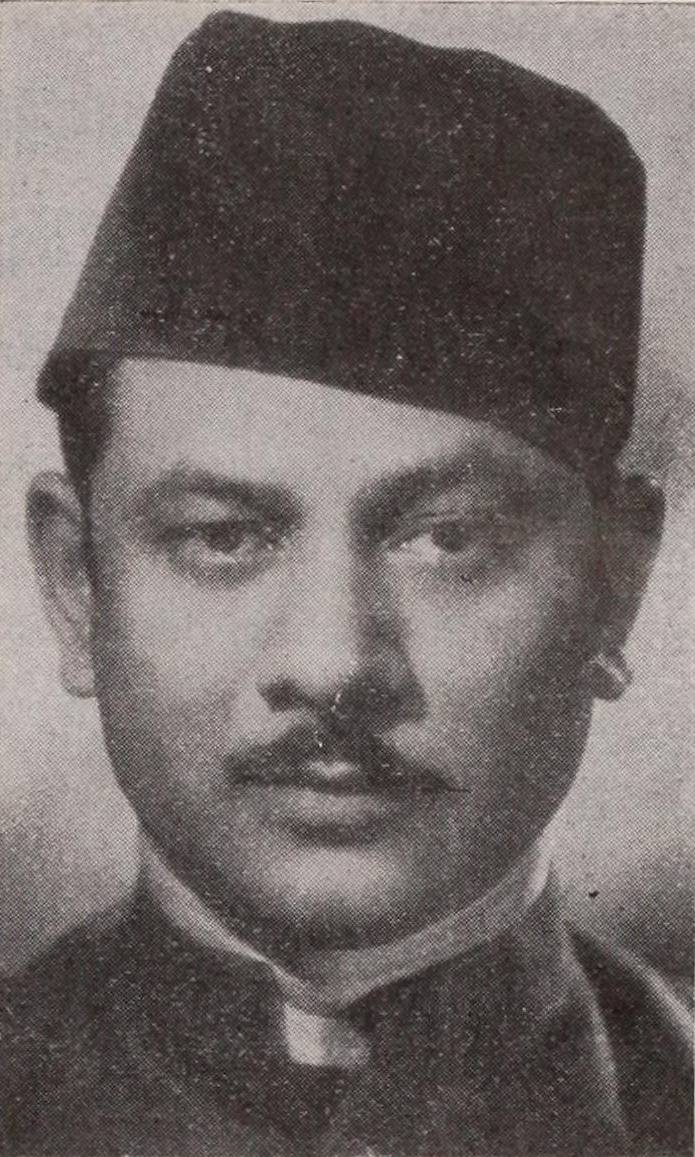
Mehboob Khan won for Mother India (1957)

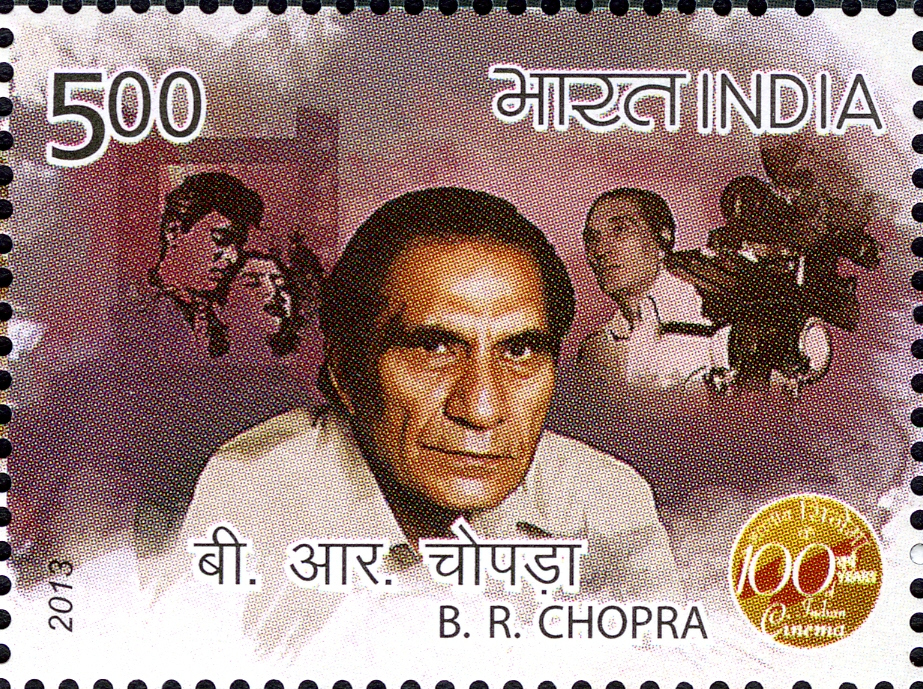
B. R. Chopra won for Kanoon (1961)

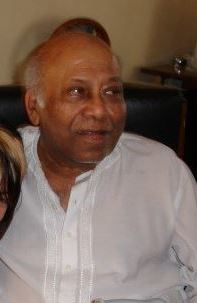
Abrar Alvi won for Sahib Bibi Aur Ghulam (1962)

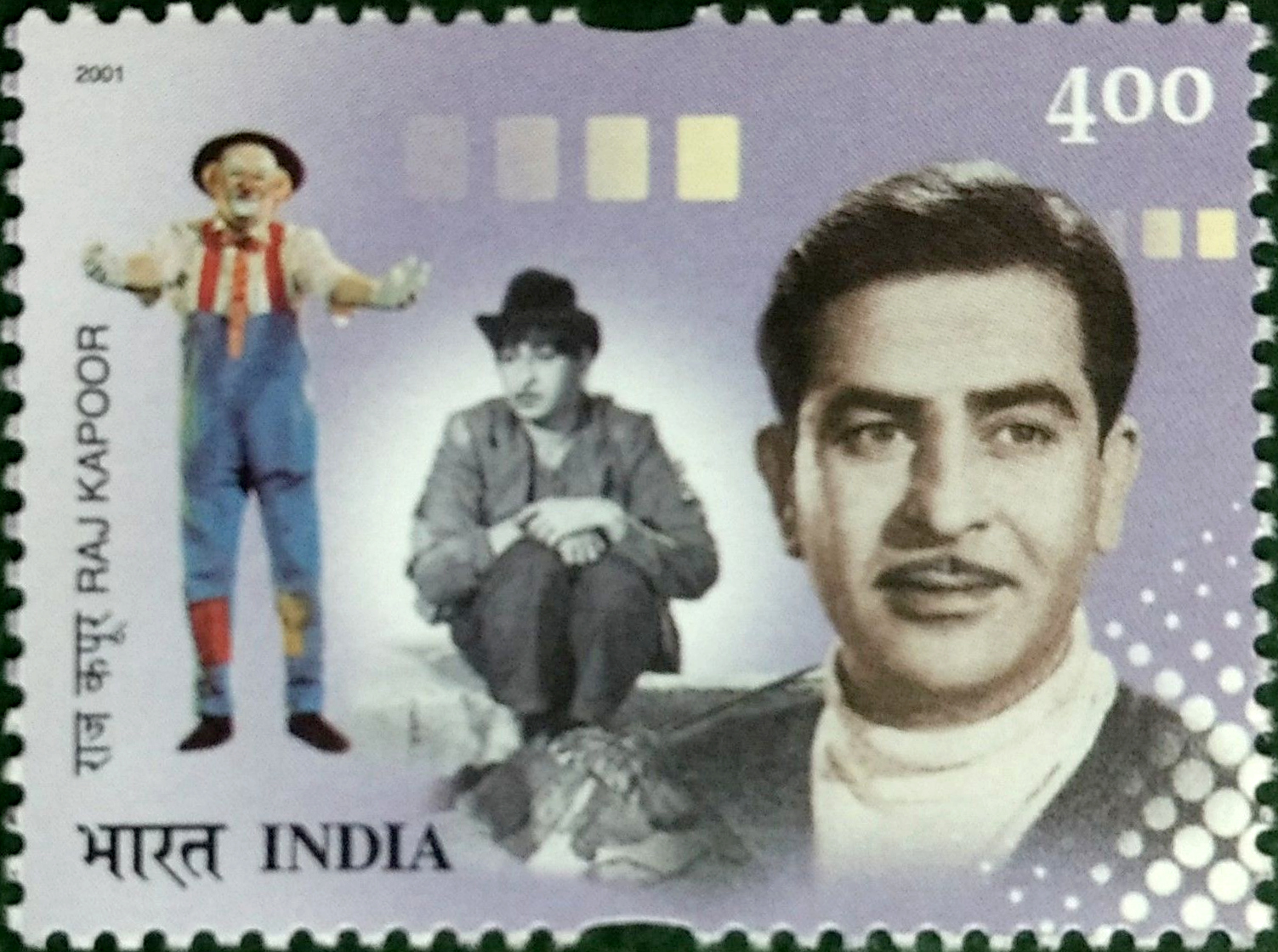
Raj Kapoor won three times

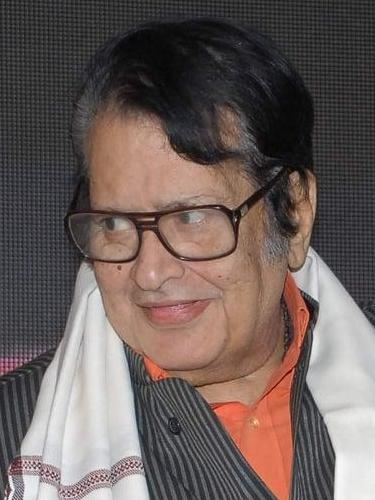
Manoj Kumar won two times

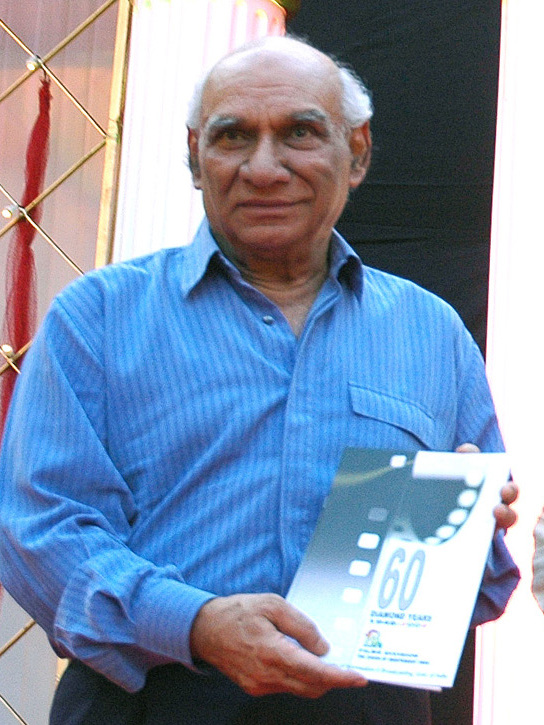
Yash Chopra won four times

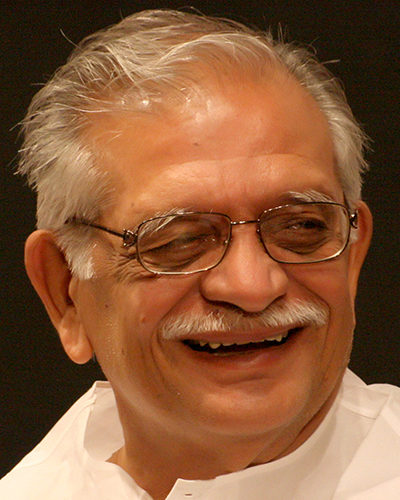
Gulzar won for Mausam (1975)

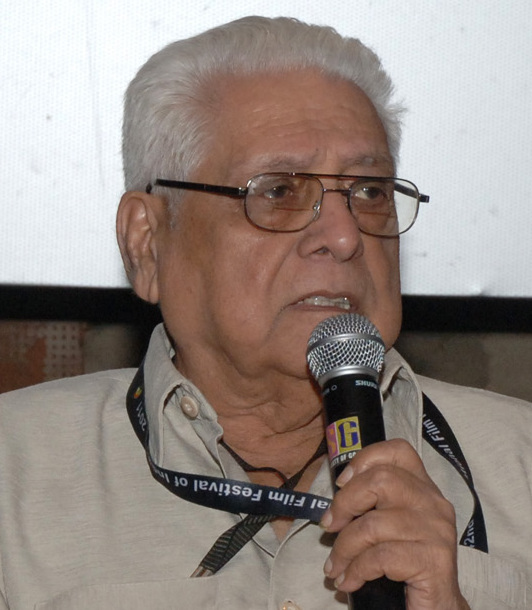
Basu Chatterjee won for Swami (1977)

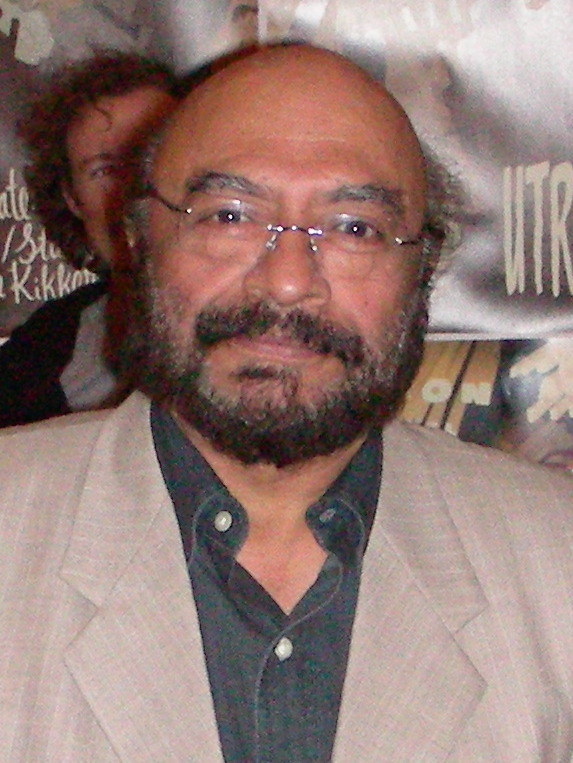
Govind Nihalani won twice for Aakrosh (1980) & Ardh Satya (1983)

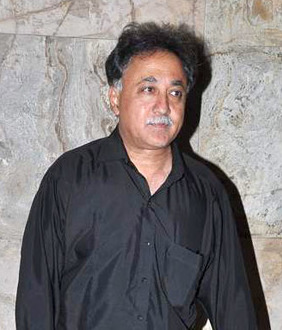
Mansoor Khan won for Qayamat Se Qayamat Tak (1988)

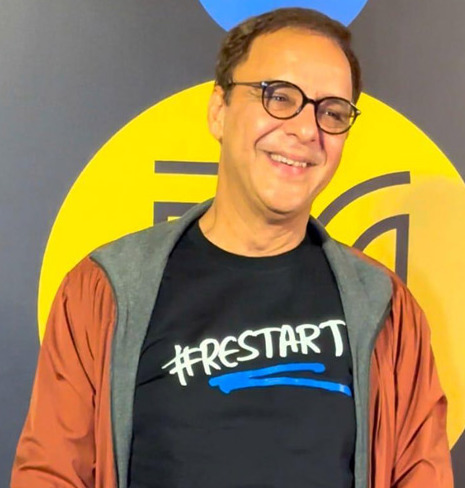
Vidhu Vinod Chopra won twice for Parinda (1989) & 12th Fail (2023)

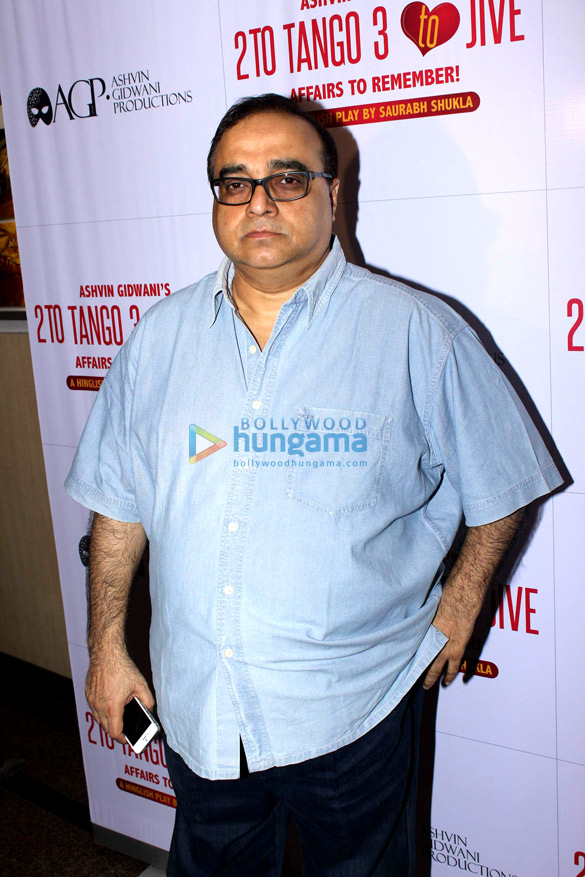
Rajkumar Santoshi won twice for Ghayal (1990) & Damini (1993)

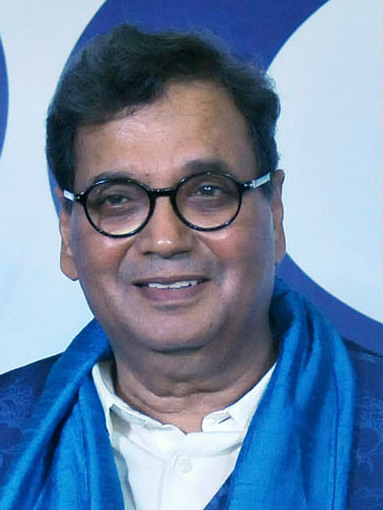
Subhash Ghai won for Saudagar (1991)

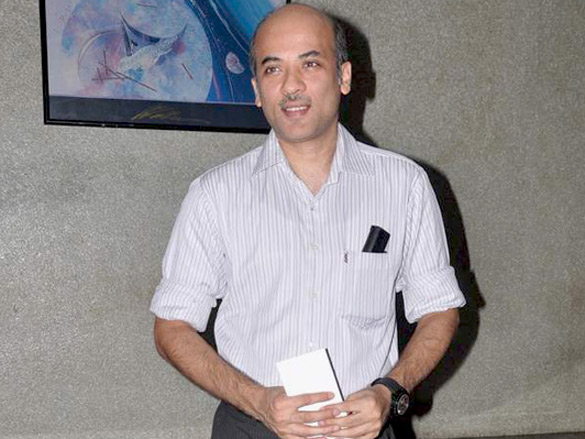
Sooraj Barjatya won for Hum Aapke Hain Koun..! (1993)

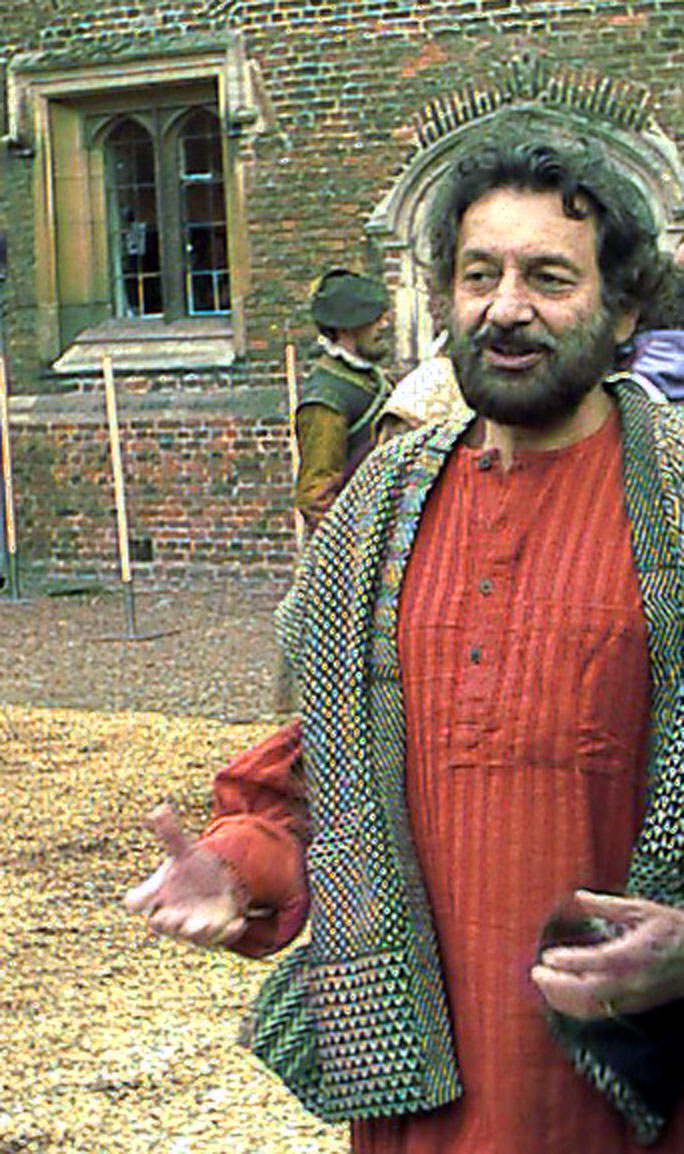
Shekhar Kapur won for Bandit Queen (1996)

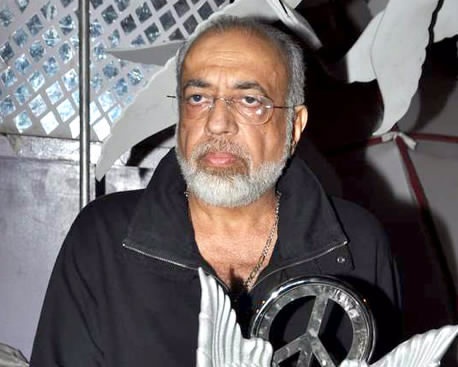
J. P. Dutta won for Border (1997)

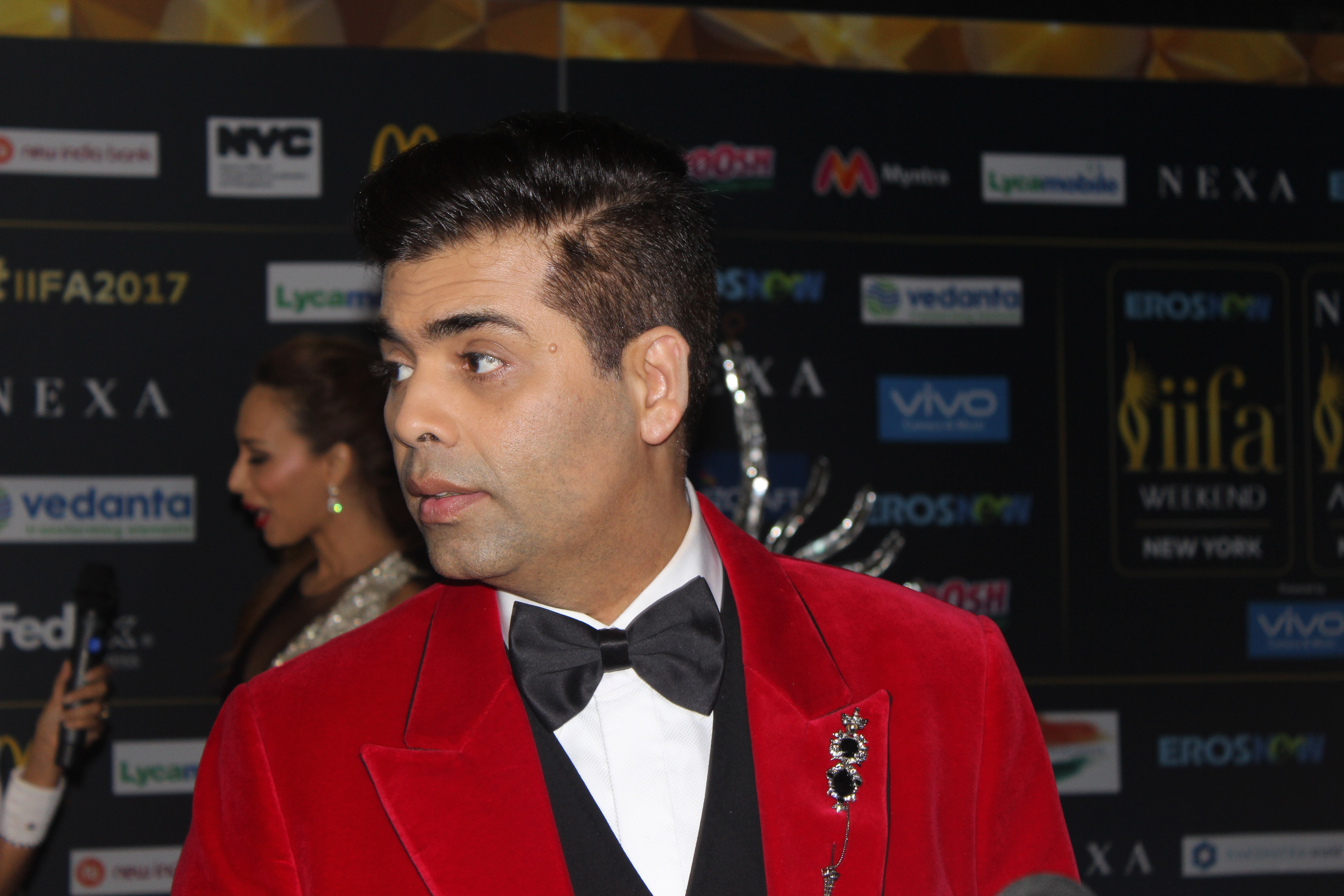
Karan Johar won twice for Kuch Kuch Hota Hai (1998) & My Name is Khan (2010)

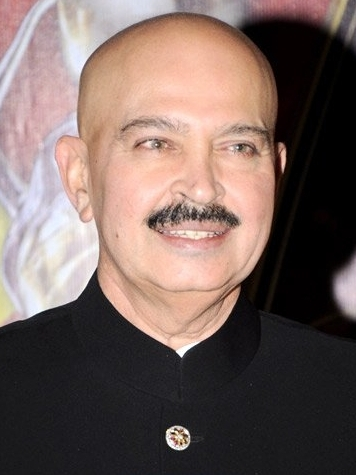
Rakesh Roshan won twice for Kaho Naa... Pyaar Hai (2000) & Koi... Mil Gaya (2003)

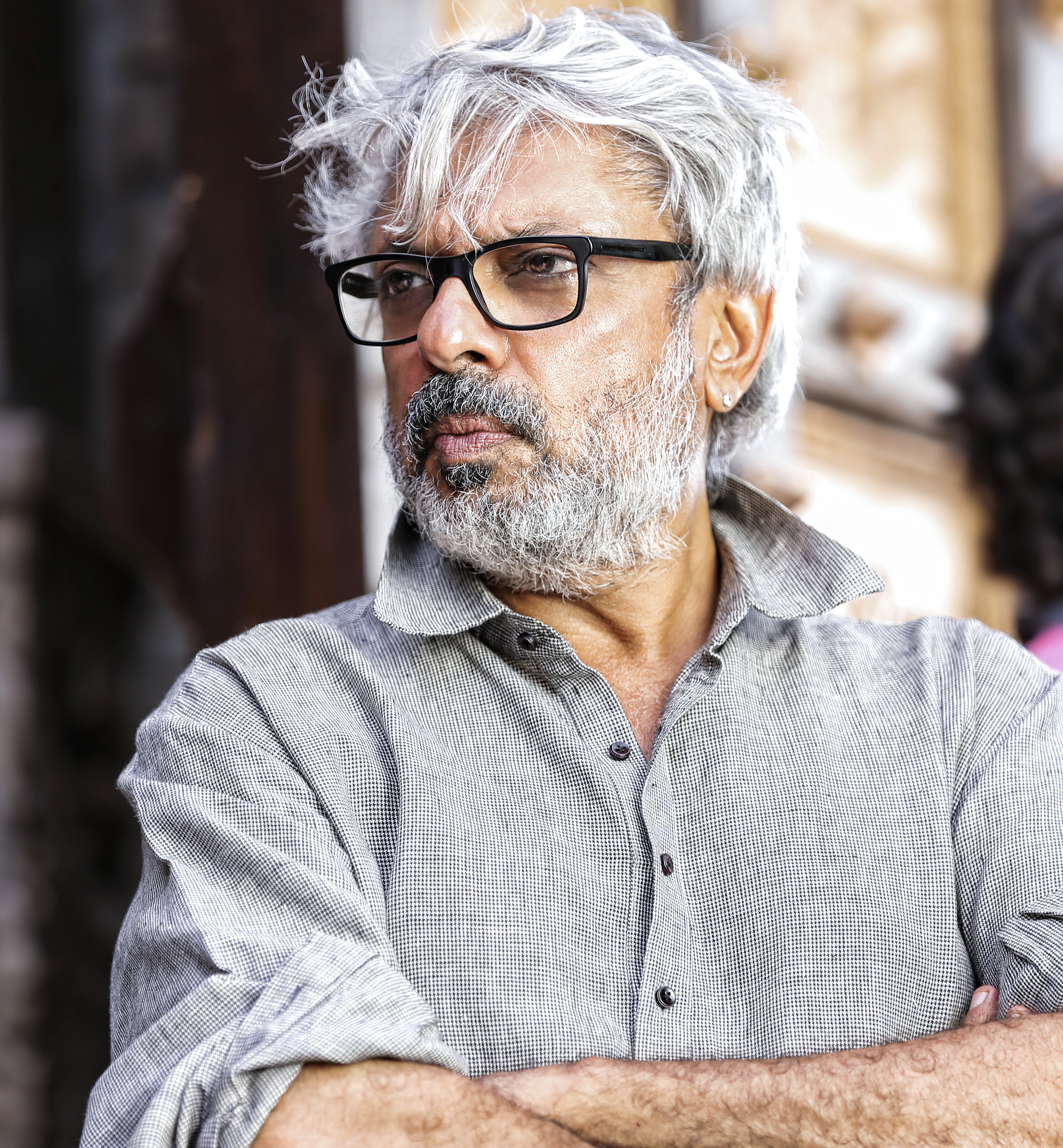
Sanjay Leela Bhansali won five times

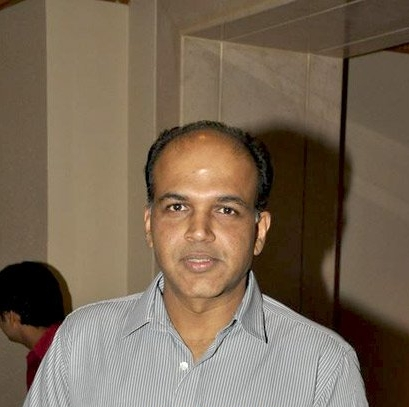
Ashutosh Gowariker won twice for Lagaan (2001) & Jodhaa Akbar (2008)

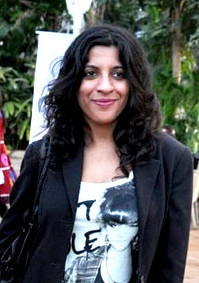
Zoya Akhtar won twice for Zindagi Na Milegi Dobara (2012) & Gully Boy (2019); first woman to win twice

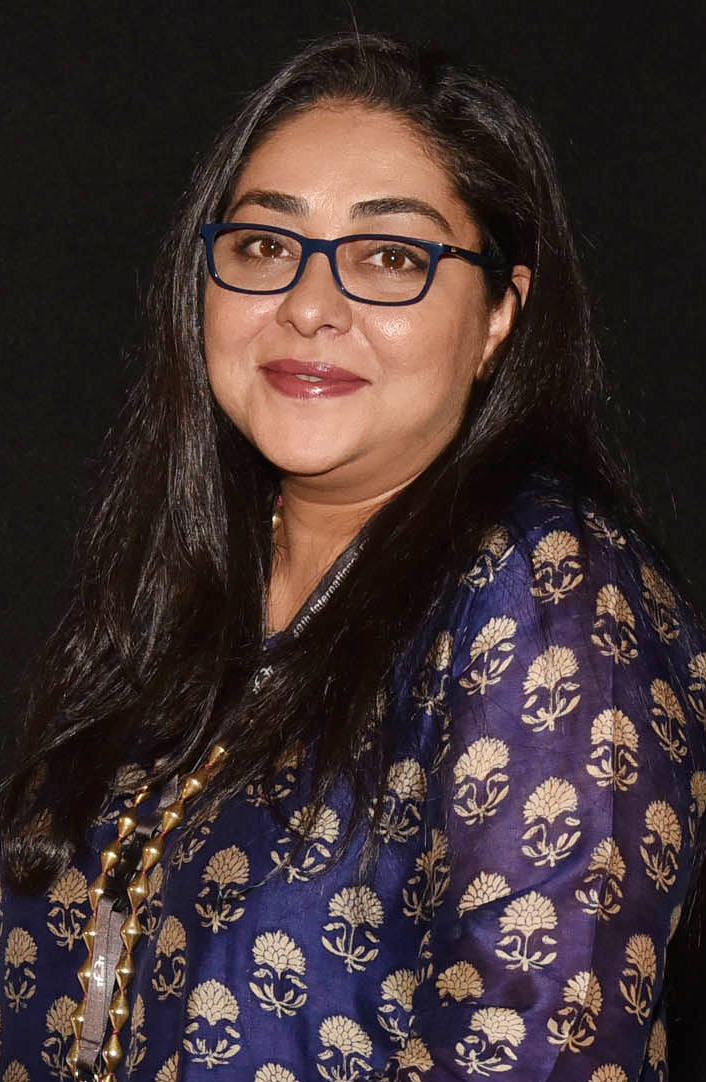
Meghna Gulzar won for Raazi (2018)

Table key
Indicates the winner

=== 1950s ===
Year	Director(s)	Film	Ref.
1954 (1st)	Bimal Roy	Do Bigha Zamin	
1954 (1st)	No Nominees		
1955 (2nd)	Bimal Roy	Parineeta	
1955 (2nd)	No Nominees		
1956 (3rd)	Bimal Roy	Biraj Bahu	
1956 (3rd)	No Nominees		
1957 (4th)	V. Shantaram	Jhanak Jhanak Payal Baaje	
1957 (4th)	No Nominees		
1958 (5th)	Mehboob Khan	Mother India	
1958 (5th)	No Nominees		
1959 (6th)	Bimal Roy	Madhumati	
1959 (6th)	B. R. Chopra	Sadhna	
1959 (6th)	Mahesh Kaul	Talaaq	

=== 1960s ===
Year	Director(s)	Film	Ref.
1960 (7th)	Bimal Roy	Sujata	
1960 (7th)	L. V. Prasad	Choti Bahen	
1960 (7th)	V. Shantaram	Navrang	
1961 (8th)	Bimal Roy	Parakh	
1961 (8th)	K. Asif	Mughal-e-Azam	
1961 (8th)	Kishore Sahu	Dil Apna Aur Preet Parai	
1962 (9th)	B. R. Chopra	Kanoon	
1962 (9th)	Nitin Bose	Gunga Jumna	
1962 (9th)	Radhu Karmakar	Jis Desh Men Ganga Behti Hai	
1963 (10th)	Abrar Alvi	Sahib Bibi Aur Ghulam	
1963 (10th)	Biren Nag	Bees Saal Baad	
1963 (10th)	Mehboob Khan	Son of India	
1964 (11th)	Bimal Roy	Bandini	
1964 (11th)	B. R. Chopra	Gumrah	
1964 (11th)	C. V. Sridhar	Dil Ek Mandir	
1965 (12th)	Raj Kapoor	Sangam	
1965 (12th)	Khwaja Ahmad Abbas	Shehar Aur Sapna	
1965 (12th)	Satyen Bose	Dosti	
1966 (13th)	Yash Chopra	Waqt	
1966 (13th)	Chetan Anand	Haqeeqat	
1966 (13th)	Ramanand Sagar	Arzoo	
1967 (14th)	Vijay Anand	Guide	
1967 (14th)	Asit Sen	Mamta	
1967 (14th)	Hrishikesh Mukherjee	Anupama	
1968 (15th)	Manoj Kumar	Upkar	
1968 (15th)	A. Bhimsingh	Mehrban	
1968 (15th)	A. Subba Rao	Milan	
1969 (16th)	Ramanand Sagar	Ankhen	
1969 (16th)	Bhappi Sonie	Brahmachari	
1969 (16th)	Ram Maheshwari	Neel Kamal	

=== 1970s ===
Year	Director(s)	Film	Ref.
1970 (17th)	Yash Chopra	Ittefaq	
1970 (17th)	L. V. Prasad	Jeene Ki Raah	
1970 (17th)	Shakti Samanta	Aradhana	
1971 (18th)	Asit Sen	Safar	
1971 (18th)	Raj Khosla	Do Raaste	
1971 (18th)	Sohanlal Kanwar	Pehchan	
1972 (19th)	Raj Kapoor	Mera Naam Joker	
1972 (19th)	Hrishikesh Mukherjee	Anand	
1972 (19th)	Shakti Samanta	Kati Patang	
1973 (20th)	Sohanlal Kanwar	Be-Imaan	
1973 (20th)	Kamal Amrohi	Pakeezah	
1973 (20th)	Manoj Kumar	Shor	
1974 (21st)	Yash Chopra	Daag	
1974 (21st)	Gulzar	Achanak	
1974 (21st)	Gulzar	Koshish	
1974 (21st)	Raj Kapoor	Bobby	
1974 (21st)	Rajendra Bhatia	Aaj Ki Taaza Khabar	
1975 (22nd)	Manoj Kumar	Roti Kapda Aur Makaan	
1975 (22nd)	Anil Ganguly	Kora Kagaz	
1975 (22nd)	Basu Bhattacharya	Avishkaar	
1975 (22nd)	M. S. Sathyu	Garm Hava	
1975 (22nd)	Shyam Benegal	Ankur	
1976 (23rd)	Yash Chopra	Deewaar	
1976 (23rd)	Gulzar	Aandhi	
1976 (23rd)	Ramesh Sippy	Sholay	
1976 (23rd)	Shakti Samanta	Amanush	
1976 (23rd)	Sohanlal Kanwar	Sanyasi	
1977 (24th)	Gulzar	Mausam	
1977 (24th)	Basu Chatterjee	Chhoti Si Baat	
1977 (24th)	Basu Chatterjee	Chitchor	
1977 (24th)	Rajkumar Kohli	Nagin	
1977 (24th)	Yash Chopra	Kabhi Kabhie	
1978 (25th)	Basu Chatterjee	Swami	
1978 (25th)	Asrani	Chala Murari Hero Banne	
1978 (25th)	Bhimsain	Gharaonda	
1978 (25th)	Gulzar	Kinara	
1978 (25th)	Manmohan Desai	Amar Akbar Anthony	
1979 (26th)	Satyajit Ray	Shatranj Ke Khilari	
1979 (26th)	Prakash Mehra	Muqaddar Ka Sikandar	
1979 (26th)	Raj Kapoor	Satyam Shivam Sundaram	
1979 (26th)	Raj Khosla	Main Tulsi Tere Aangan Ki	
1979 (26th)	Yash Chopra	Trishul	

=== 1980s ===
Year	Director(s)	Film	Ref.
1980 (27th)	Shyam Benegal	Junoon	
1980 (27th)	Hrishikesh Mukherjee	Gol Maal	
1980 (27th)	Hrishikesh Mukherjee	Jurmana	
1980 (27th)	Manmohan Krishna	Noorie	
1980 (27th)	Yash Chopra	Kaala Patthar	
1981 (28th)	Govind Nihalani	Aakrosh	
1981 (28th)	B. R. Chopra	Insaaf Ka Tarazu	
1981 (28th)	Esmayeel Shroff	Thodisi Bewafaii	
1981 (28th)	Hrishikesh Mukherjee	Khubsoorat	
1981 (28th)	J. Om Prakash	Aasha	
1982 (29th)	Muzaffar Ali	Umrao Jaan	
1982 (29th)	K. Balachander	Ek Duuje Ke Liye	
1982 (29th)	Rabindra Dharamraj	Chakra	
1982 (29th)	Ramesh Talwar	Baseraa	
1982 (29th)	Sai Paranjpye	Chashme Buddoor	
1982 (29th)	Shyam Benegal	Kalyug	
1983 (30th)	Raj Kapoor	Prem Rog	
1983 (30th)	B. R. Chopra	Nikaah	
1983 (30th)	Ramesh Sippy	Shakti	
1983 (30th)	Sagar Sarhadi	Bazaar	
1983 (30th)	Subhash Ghai	Vidhaata	
1984 (31st)	Govind Nihalani	Ardh Satya	
1984 (31st)	Mahesh Bhatt	Arth	
1984 (31st)	Mohan Kumar	Avtaar	
1984 (31st)	Rahul Rawail	Betaab	
1984 (31st)	Shekhar Kapur	Masoom	
1985 (32nd)	Sai Paranjpye	Sparsh	
1985 (32nd)	Kundan Shah	Jaane Bhi Do Yaaro	
1985 (32nd)	Mahesh Bhatt	Saaransh	
1985 (32nd)	Prakash Mehra	Sharaabi	
1985 (32nd)	Ravi Chopra	Aaj Ki Awaaz	
1986 (33rd)	Raj Kapoor	Ram Teri Ganga Maili	
1986 (33rd)	Mahesh Bhatt	Janam	
1986 (33rd)	Rahul Rawail	Arjun	
1986 (33rd)	Ramesh Sippy	Saagar	
1987	No Award		
1988	No Award		
1989 (34th)	Mansoor Khan	Qayamat Se Qayamat Tak	
1989 (34th)	N. Chandra	Tezaab	
1989 (34th)	Rakesh Roshan	Khoon Bhari Maang	

=== 1990s ===
Year	Director(s)	Film	Ref.
1990 (35th)	Vidhu Vinod Chopra	Parinda	
1990 (35th)	Mira Nair	Salaam Bombay!	
1990 (35th)	Sooraj Barjatya	Maine Pyar Kiya	
1990 (35th)	Subhash Ghai	Ram Lakhan	
1990 (35th)	Yash Chopra	Chandni	
1991 (36th)	Rajkumar Santoshi	Ghayal	
1991 (36th)	Mahesh Bhatt	Aashiqui	
1991 (36th)	Mukul Anand	Agneepath	
1991 (36th)	Ravi Raja Pinisetty	Pratibandh	
1992 (37th)	Subhash Ghai	Saudagar	
1992 (37th)	Lawrence D'Souza	Saajan	
1992 (37th)	Mahesh Bhatt	Dil Hai Ke Manta Nahin	
1992 (37th)	Randhir Kapoor	Henna	
1992 (37th)	Yash Chopra	Lamhe	
1993 (38th)	Mukul S. Anand	Khuda Gawah	
1993 (38th)	Indra Kumar	Beta	
1993 (38th)	Mansoor Khan	Jo Jeeta Wohi Sikandar	
1994 (39th)	Rajkumar Santoshi	Damini	
1994 (39th)	David Dhawan	Aankhen	
1994 (39th)	Mahesh Bhatt	Hum Hain Rahi Pyar Ke	
1994 (39th)	Subhash Ghai	Khalnayak	
1994 (39th)	Yash Chopra	Darr	
1995 (40th)	Sooraj Barjatya	Hum Aapke Hain Koun..!	
1995 (40th)	Mehul Kumar	Krantiveer	
1995 (40th)	Rajiv Rai	Mohra	
1995 (40th)	Rajkumar Santoshi	Andaz Apna Apna	
1995 (40th)	Vidhu Vinod Chopra	1942: A Love Story	
1996 (41st)	Aditya Chopra	Dilwale Dulhania Le Jayenge	
1996 (41st)	Indra Kumar	Raja	
1996 (41st)	Mansoor Khan	Akele Hum Akele Tum	
1996 (41st)	Rakesh Roshan	Karan Arjun	
1996 (41st)	Ram Gopal Varma	Rangeela	
1997 (42nd)	Shekhar Kapur	Bandit Queen	
1997 (42nd)	Dharmesh Darshan	Raja Hindustani	
1997 (42nd)	Gulzar	Maachis	
1997 (42nd)	Partho Ghosh	Agni Sakshi	
1997 (42nd)	Rajkumar Santoshi	Ghatak	
1998 (43rd)	J. P. Dutta	Border	
1998 (43rd)	Priyadarshan	Virasat	
1998 (43rd)	Rajiv Rai	Gupt	
1998 (43rd)	Subhash Ghai	Pardes	
1998 (43rd)	Yash Chopra	Dil To Pagal Hai	
1999 (44th)	Karan Johar	Kuch Kuch Hota Hai	
1999 (44th)	Abbas–Mustan	Soldier	
1999 (44th)	Ram Gopal Varma	Satya	
1999 (44th)	Sohail Khan	Pyaar Kiya To Darna Kya	
1999 (44th)	Vikram Bhatt	Ghulam	

=== 2000s ===
Year	Director(s)	Film	Ref.
2000 (45th)	Sanjay Leela Bhansali	Hum Dil De Chuke Sanam	
2000 (45th)	David Dhawan	Biwi No.1	
2000 (45th)	John Matthew Matthan	Sarfarosh	
2000 (45th)	Mahesh Manjrekar	Vaastav	
2000 (45th)	Subhash Ghai	Taal	
2001 (46th)	Rakesh Roshan	Kaho Naa... Pyaar Hai	
2001 (46th)	Aditya Chopra	Mohabbatein	
2001 (46th)	Dharmesh Darshan	Dhadkan	
2001 (46th)	Mansoor Khan	Josh	
2001 (46th)	Vidhu Vinod Chopra	Mission Kashmir	
2002 (47th)	Ashutosh Gowariker	Lagaan	
2002 (47th)	Anil Sharma	Gadar: Ek Prem Katha	
2002 (47th)	Farhan Akhtar	Dil Chahta Hai	
2002 (47th)	Karan Johar	Kabhi Khushi Kabhie Gham	
2002 (47th)	Santosh Sivan	Asoka	
2003 (48th)	Sanjay Leela Bhansali	Devdas	
2003 (48th)	Abbas–Mustan	Humraaz	
2003 (48th)	Ram Gopal Varma	Company	
2003 (48th)	Sanjay Gupta	Kaante	
2003 (48th)	Vikram Bhatt	Raaz	
2004 (49th)	Rakesh Roshan	Koi... Mil Gaya	
2004 (49th)	J. P. Dutta	LOC: Kargil	
2004 (49th)	Nikhil Advani	Kal Ho Naa Ho	
2004 (49th)	Rajkumar Hirani	Munna Bhai M.B.B.S.	
2004 (49th)	Ram Gopal Varma	Bhoot	
2004 (49th)	Satish Kaushik	Tere Naam	
2005 (50th)	Kunal Kohli	Hum Tum	
2005 (50th)	Ashutosh Gowariker	Swades	
2005 (50th)	Farah Khan	Main Hoon Na	
2005 (50th)	Farhan Akhtar	Lakshya	
2005 (50th)	Rajkumar Santoshi	Khakee	
2005 (50th)	Yash Chopra	Veer-Zaara	
2006 (51st)	Sanjay Leela Bhansali	Black	
2006 (51st)	Madhur Bhandarkar	Page 3	
2006 (51st)	Nagesh Kukunoor	Iqbal	
2006 (51st)	Pradeep Sarkar	Parineeta	
2006 (51st)	Ram Gopal Varma	Sarkar	
2007 (52nd)	Rakeysh Omprakash Mehra	Rang De Basanti	
2007 (52nd)	Karan Johar	Kabhi Alvida Naa Kehna	
2007 (52nd)	Rajkumar Hirani	Lage Raho Munna Bhai	
2007 (52nd)	Rakesh Roshan	Krrish	
2007 (52nd)	Sanjay Gadhvi	Dhoom 2	
2007 (52nd)	Vishal Bhardwaj	Omkara	
2008 (53rd)	Aamir Khan	Taare Zameen Par	
2008 (53rd)	Anurag Basu	Life in a... Metro	
2008 (53rd)	Farah Khan	Om Shanti Om	
2008 (53rd)	Imtiaz Ali	Jab We Met	
2008 (53rd)	Mani Ratnam	Guru	
2008 (53rd)	Shimit Amin	Chak De! India	
2009 (54th)	Ashutosh Gowariker	Jodhaa Akbar	
2009 (54th)	A. R. Murugadoss	Ghajini	
2009 (54th)	Abhishek Kapoor	Rock On!!	
2009 (54th)	Aditya Chopra	Rab Ne Bana Di Jodi	
2009 (54th)	Madhur Bhandarkar	Fashion	
2009 (54th)	Neeraj Pandey	A Wednesday!	

=== 2010s ===
Year	Director(s)	Film	Ref.
2010 (55th)	Rajkumar Hirani	3 Idiots	
2010 (55th)	Anurag Kashyap	Dev.D	
2010 (55th)	Ayan Mukerji	Wake Up Sid	
2010 (55th)	Imtiaz Ali	Love Aaj Kal	
2010 (55th)	R. Balki	Paa	
2010 (55th)	Vishal Bhardwaj	Kaminey	
2011 (56th)	Karan Johar	My Name is Khan	
2011 (56th)	Abhinav Kashyap	Dabangg	
2011 (56th)	Manish Sharma	Band Baaja Baaraat	
2011 (56th)	Sanjay Leela Bhansali	Guzaarish	
2011 (56th)	Vikramaditya Motwane	Udaan	
2012 (57th)	Zoya Akhtar	Zindagi Na Milegi Dobara	
2012 (57th)	Abhinay Deo	Delhi Belly	
2012 (57th)	Farhan Akhtar	Don 2	
2012 (57th)	Imtiaz Ali	Rockstar	
2012 (57th)	Milan Luthria	The Dirty Picture	
2012 (57th)	Raj Kumar Gupta	No One Killed Jessica	
2013 (58th)	Sujoy Ghosh	Kahaani	
2013 (58th)	Anurag Basu	Barfi!	
2013 (58th)	Anurag Kashyap	Gangs of Wasseypur	
2013 (58th)	Gauri Shinde	English Vinglish	
2013 (58th)	Shoojit Sircar	Vicky Donor	
2014 (59th)	Rakeysh Omprakash Mehra	Bhaag Milkha Bhaag	
2014 (59th)	Abhishek Kapoor	Kai Po Che!	
2014 (59th)	Anand L. Rai	Raanjhanaa	
2014 (59th)	Ayan Mukerji	Yeh Jawaani Hai Deewani	
2014 (59th)	Rohit Shetty	Chennai Express	
2014 (59th)	Sanjay Leela Bhansali	Goliyon Ki Raasleela Ram-Leela	
2015 (60th)	Vikas Bahl	Queen	
2015 (60th)	Abhishek Varman	2 States	
2015 (60th)	Anurag Kashyap	Ugly	
2015 (60th)	Rajkumar Hirani	PK	
2015 (60th)	Vishal Bhardwaj	Haider	
2016 (61st)	Sanjay Leela Bhansali	Bajirao Mastani	
2016 (61st)	Anand L. Rai	Tanu Weds Manu Returns	
2016 (61st)	Kabir Khan	Bajrangi Bhaijaan	
2016 (61st)	Meghna Gulzar	Talvar	
2016 (61st)	Shoojit Sircar	Piku	
2016 (61st)	Sriram Raghavan	Badlapur	
2017 (62nd)	Nitesh Tiwari	Dangal	
2017 (62nd)	Abhishek Chaubey	Udta Punjab	
2017 (62nd)	Ali Abbas Zafar	Sultan	
2017 (62nd)	Karan Johar	Ae Dil Hai Mushkil	
2017 (62nd)	Ram Madhvani	Neerja	
2017 (62nd)	Shakun Batra	Kapoor & Sons	
2018 (63rd)	Ashwiny Iyer Tiwari	Bareilly Ki Barfi	
2018 (63rd)	Advait Chandan	Secret Superstar	
2018 (63rd)	Saket Chaudhary	Hindi Medium	
2018 (63rd)	Shashank Khaitan	Badrinath Ki Dulhania	
2018 (63rd)	Shree Narayan Singh	Toilet: Ek Prem Katha	
2019 (64th)	Meghna Gulzar	Raazi	
2019 (64th)	Amar Kaushik	Stree	
2019 (64th)	Amit Sharma	Badhaai Ho	
2019 (64th)	Rajkumar Hirani	Sanju	
2019 (64th)	Sanjay Leela Bhansali	Padmaavat	
2019 (64th)	Sriram Raghavan	Andhadhun	

=== 2020s ===
Year	Director(s)	Film	Ref.
2020 (65th)	Zoya Akhtar	Gully Boy	
2020 (65th)	Aditya Dhar	Uri: The Surgical Strike	
2020 (65th)	Jagan Shakti	Mission Mangal	
2020 (65th)	Nitesh Tiwari	Chhichhore	
2020 (65th)	Siddharth Anand	War	
2021 (66th)	Om Raut	Tanhaji	
2021 (66th)	Anubhav Sinha	Thappad	
2021 (66th)	Anurag Basu	Ludo	
2021 (66th)	Sharan Sharma	Gunjan Saxena: The Kargil Girl	
2021 (66th)	Shoojit Sircar	Gulabo Sitabo	
2022 (67th)	Vishnuvardhan	Shershaah	
2022 (67th)	Akarsh Khurana	Rashmi Rocket	
2022 (67th)	Kabir Khan	83	
2022 (67th)	Seema Pahwa	Ramprasad Ki Tehrvi	
2022 (67th)	Shoojit Sircar	Sardar Udham	
2023 (68th)	Sanjay Leela Bhansali	Gangubai Kathiawadi	
2023 (68th)	Anees Bazmee	Bhool Bhulaiyaa 2	
2023 (68th)	Ayan Mukerji	Brahmāstra: Part One – Shiva	
2023 (68th)	Harshavardhan Kulkarni	Badhaai Do	
2023 (68th)	Sooraj Barjatya	Uunchai	
2023 (68th)	Vivek Agnihotri	The Kashmir Files	
2024 (69th)	Vidhu Vinod Chopra	12th Fail	
2024 (69th)	Amit Rai	OMG 2	
2024 (69th)	Atlee	Jawan	
2024 (69th)	Karan Johar	Rocky Aur Rani Kii Prem Kahaani	
2024 (69th)	Sandeep Reddy Vanga	Animal	
2024 (69th)	Siddharth Anand	Pathaan	
2025 (70th)	Kiran Rao	Laapataa Ladies	
2025 (70th)	Aditya Suhas Jambhale	Article 370	
2025 (70th)	Amar Kaushik	Stree 2	
2025 (70th)	Anees Bazmee	Bhool Bhulaiyaa 3	
2025 (70th)	Nikhil Nagesh Bhat	Kill	

== See also ==
- Filmfare Awards
- Bollywood
- Cinema of India
