= 24th Filmfare Awards =

1977 awards for Hindi cinema

- Date: June 20, 1977
- Site: Shanmukhananda Hall, Bombay

Highlights
- Best Film: Mausam
- Best Actor: Sanjeev Kumar for Arjun Pandit
- Best Actress: Raakhee for Tapasya
- Most awards: Kabhi Kabhie (4)
- Most nominations: Kabhi Kabhie (13)

The 24th Filmfare Awards for Hindi cinema were held in Bombay on June 20, 1977.

Kabhi Kabhie led the ceremony with 13 nominations, followed by Mausam with 8 nominations and Chhoti Si Baat with 6 nominations.

Kabhi Kabhie won 4 awards, thus becoming the most-awarded film at the ceremony.

Basu Chatterjee received dual nominations for Best Director for his direction in Chitchor and Chhoti Si Baat, but lost to Gulzar who won the award for Mausam, his only win in the category.

Sanjeev Kumar received dual nominations for Best Actor for his performances in Arjun Pandit and Mausam, winning for the former.

Raakhee received dual nominations for Best Actress for her performances in Kabhi Kabhie and Tapasya, winning for the latter, her first and only win in the category.

Prem Chopra received dual nominations for Best Supporting Actor for his performances in Do Anjaane and Mehbooba, winning for the former, his only win in the category.

== Main awards ==
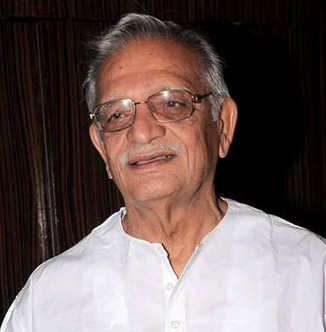
Gulzar — Best Director winner for Mausam

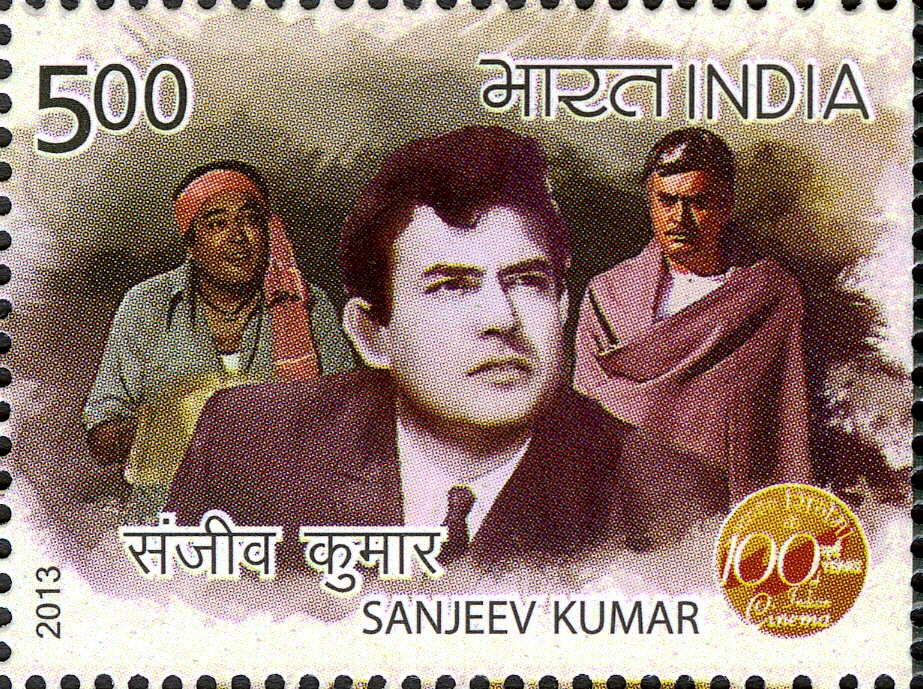
Sanjeev Kumar — Best Actor winner for Arjun Pandit

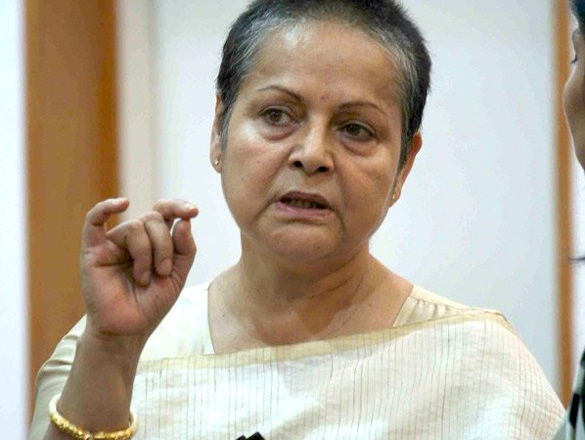
Rakhee — Best Actress winner for Tapasya

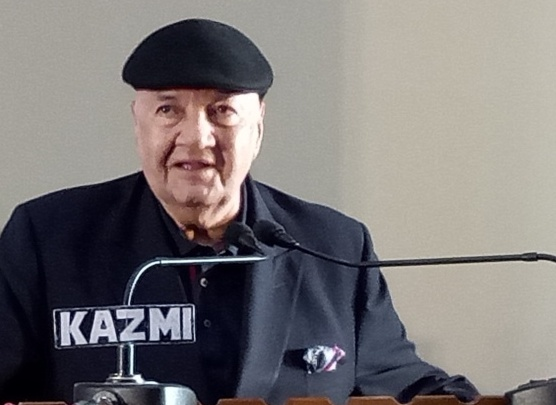
Prem Chopra — Best Supporting Actor winner for Do Anjaane

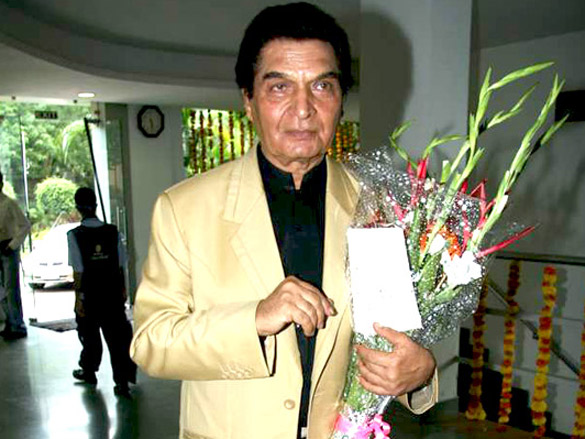
Asrani — Best Comic Actor winner for Balika Badhu

Hemlata — Best Playback Singer, Female winner for "Tu Jo Mere Sur" (Chitchor)

=== Best Film ===
Mausam

- Chitchor
- Chhoti Si Baat
- Kabhi Kabhie
- Tapasya

=== Best Director ===
Gulzar – Mausam

- Basu Chatterjee – Chhoti Si Baat
- Basu Chatterjee – Chitchor
- Rajkumar Kohli – Nagin
- Yash Chopra – Kabhi Kabhie

=== Best Actor ===
Sanjeev Kumar – Arjun Pandit

- Amitabh Bachchan – Kabhi Kabhie
- Amol Palekar – Chhoti Si Baat
- Dilip Kumar – Bairaag
- Sanjeev Kumar – Mausam

=== Best Actress ===
Raakhee – Tapasya

- Hema Malini – Mehbooba
- Raakhee – Kabhi Kabhie
- Reena Roy – Nagin
- Sharmila Tagore – Mausam

=== Best Supporting Actor ===
Prem Chopra – Do Anjaane

- Ashok Kumar – Chhoti Si Baat
- Prem Chopra – Mehbooba
- Shashi Kapoor – Kabhi Kabhie
- Vinod Khanna – Hera Pheri

=== Best Supporting Actress ===
Kajri – Balika Badhu

- Asha Parekh – Udhar Ka Sindoor
- Bindu – Arjun Pandit
- Dina Pathak – Mausam
- Waheeda Rehman – Kabhi Kabhie

=== Best Comic Actor ===
Asrani – Balika Vadhu

- Asrani – Choti Si Baat
- Deven Verma – Arjun Pandit
- Deven Verma – Ek Se Badhkar Ek
- Mehmood – Sabse Bada Rupaiya

=== Best Story ===
Arjun Pandit – Balachand Mukherjee

- Kabhi Kabhie – Pamela Chopra
- Mausam – Kamleshwar
- Mehbooba – Gulshan Nanda
- Tapasya – Ashapoorna Devi

=== Best Screenplay ===
Chhoti Si Baat – Basu Chatterjee

=== Best Dialogue ===
Kabhi Kabhie – Sagar Sarhadi

=== Best Music Director ===
Kabhi Kabhie – Khayyam

- Bairaag – Kalyanji–Anandji
- Chitchor – Ravindra Jain
- Mausam – Madan Mohan
- Mehbooba – R. D. Burman

=== Best Lyricist ===
Kabhi Kabhie – Sahir Ludhianvi for Kabhi Kabhie Mere Dil Mein

- Dharam Karam – Majrooh Sultanpuri for Ik Din Bik Jayega
- Kabhi Kabhie – Sahir Ludhianvi for Main Pal Do Pal Ka
- Mausam – Gulzar for Dil Dhoondta Hai
- Mehbooba – Anand Bakshi for Mere Naina Sawan Bhadon

=== Best Playback Singer, Male ===
Kabhi Kabhie – Mukesh for Kabhi Kabhie Mere Dil Mein

- Chitchor – K. J. Yesudas for Gori Tera Gaon
- Dharam Karam – Mukesh for Ek Din Bik Jayega
- Fakira – Mahendra Kapoor for Sunke Teri Pukar
- Kabhi Kabhie – Mukesh for Main Pal Do Pal Ka

=== Best Playback Singer, Female ===
Chitchor – Hemlata for Tu Jo Mere Sur

- Barood – Asha Bhosle for I Love You
- Fakira – Hemlata for Sunke Teri Pukar
- Sankoch – Sulakshana Pandit for Bandhire Kahi Preet

=== Best Art Direction ===
Fakira – S. S. Samel

=== Best Cinematography ===
Fakira – Fali Mistry

=== Best Editing ===
Balika Vadhu – Bijoy Chowdhury

=== Best Sound ===
Bairaag – P. Harikishan

== Critics' awards ==
=== Best Film ===
Mrigayaa

=== Best Documentary ===
Marvel of Memory

=== Special Award ===
K. J. Yesudas - Chitchor - "Gori Tera gaon bada pyara"

== Biggest Winners ==
- Kabhi Kabhie – 4/12
- Balika Badhu – 3/3
- Mausam – 2/8
- Arjun Pandit – 2/4
- Fakira – 2/4
- Chitchor – 1/4
- Bairaag – 1/3
- Tapasya – 1/3
- Chhoti Si Baat – 1/6

== See also ==
- 26th Filmfare Awards
- 25th Filmfare Awards
- Filmfare Awards
