= Kabhie Kabhie (disambiguation) =

Kabhie Kabhie may refer to:

- Kabhie Kabhie (1976 film), a Bollywood film
  - "Kabhi Kabhie Mere Dil Mein", the film's title song
- Kabhie Kabhie (1997 TV series), a Star Plus television drama directed by Mahesh Bhatt
- Kabhie Kabhie (2003 TV series), a Zee TV television series
- Kabhi Kabhi (2013 TV series), a Pakistani drama broadcast on ARY Digital
