= Chalte Chalte Mere Yeh Geet =

1976 Hindi song by Kishore Kumar

Song by Kishore Kumar

from the album Chalte Chalte
- Released: 1976
- Genre: Filmi
- Songwriter(s): Amit Khanna
- Producer(s): Bappi Lahiri

"Chalte Chalte Mere Yeh Geet" is a song from Chalte Chalte which was sung by Kishore Kumar, lyric by Amit Khanna and music directed by Bappi Lahiri.

== Critical reception ==
Ziya Us Salam of The Hindu wrote "One can say something similar about Kishore Kumar. His song in "Chalte Chalte", a 1976 film directed by Sunder Dar, "Chalte chalte mere ye geet yaad rakhna" echoes in our ears though the film is long forgotten.", Roshmila Bhattacharya of Hindustan Times wrote "'Chalte Chalte mere yeh geet yaad rakhna kabhi alvida na kehna,' so true for Bappida who even at 60 continues to be a chartbusting Royal Bengal Tiger!", Avijit Ghosh of The Times of India wrote it as one of the finest score by Bappi Lahiri.

On February 17, 2022, Amul honored Bappi Lahiri with reference to this song.

This song was one of the superhit song by Bappi Lahiri and this song made Vishal Anand a popular actor.
