= Dil Se Mile Dil =

1978 film by Bhisham Kohli

- Starring: Bhisham Kohli; Shyamlee; Lalita Pawar
- Cinematography: F. R. Khan
- Edited by: Ravishankar Patnaik
- Music by: Bappi Lahiri
- Release date: 1978
- Country: India
- Language: Hindi

Dil Se Mile Dil is a 1978 Hindi movie. Produced and directed by Bhisham Kohli (of Chalte Chalte fame), the film stars Vishal Anand, Shyamlee, Om Shivpuri, Lalita Pawar and Mehmood. The film was a surprise hit, but did nothing for Vishal Anand's career. Vishal Anand was a nephew of Dev Anand.

== Soundtrack ==
The film's music is by Bappi Lahiri and four out of the five songs composed by him are hummable even to this day. Amit Khanna wrote all the songs.

1. "Dil Se Mile Dil" (Kishore Kumar)
2. "Yeh Naina Yeh Kaajal" (Kishore Kumar)
3. "Chhodo Bhee Yeh Nakhraa" (Lata Mangeshkar)
4. "Haathon Mein" (Sulakshana Pandit, Vijayata Pandit and chorus)
5. "Aflatoon" (Bappi Lahiri)
6. "Dil Se Mile Dil (Part 2)" (Kishore Kumar)
