= Kabhi Kabhie =

1976 Indian Hindi film directed by Yash Chopra

- Film poster
- Directed by: Yash Chopra
- Screenplay by: Sagar Sarhadi
- Story by: Pamela Chopra
- Produced by: Yash Chopra
- Starring: Waheeda Rehman; Shashi Kapoor; Amitabh Bachchan; Raakhee; Rishi Kapoor; Neetu Singh
- Cinematography: Romesh Bhalla; Kay Gee
- Edited by: Naresh Malhotra; Pran Mehra
- Music by: Khayyam
- Production company: Yash Raj Films
- Distributed by: Yash Raj Films
- Release date: 27 February 1976
- Running time: 178 minutes
- Country: India
- Languages: Hindi; Urdu
- Box office: est. ₹40 million

Kabhi Kabhie (translation: Sometimes) is a 1976 Indian Hindi-language musical romantic drama film written by Pamela Chopra and directed and produced by Yash Chopra under the production banner of Yash Raj Films. The film was released on 27 February 1976 and stars an ensemble cast of Waheeda Rehman, Shashi Kapoor, Amitabh Bachchan, Raakhee, Rishi Kapoor and Neetu Singh. This was Yash Chopra's second directorial film with Shashi Kapoor and Bachchan in the lead roles after Deewaar (1975), and was particularly noted for its soundtrack compositions by Khayyam.

Rehman, Shashi Kapoor, Bachchan and Raakhee went on to star together in Chopra's next release, Trishul, two years later.

Kabhie Kabhie earned an estimated ₹40 million at the box office, becoming the eighth-highest grossing Hindi film of the year. At the 24th Filmfare Awards, Kabhi Kabhie received a leading 13 nominations, including Best Film, Best Director (Yash Chopra), Best Actor (Bachchan), Best Actress (Raakhee, who won for Tapasya instead), Best Supporting Actor (Shashi Kapoor) and Best Supporting Actress (Rehman), and won a leading 4 awards: Best Music Director (Khayyam), Best Dialogue, Best Lyricist (Sahir Ludhianvi) and Best Male Playback Singer (Mukesh), the latter two for the song "Kabhi Kabhie Mere Dil Mein".

== Plot ==
Amit Malhotra (Amitabh Bachchan), a budding poet, recites his poetry at his college campus in Kashmir, where he meets fellow student, Pooja (Raakhee Gulzar), and they fall in love. However, destiny has other plans as Pooja's parents arrange her marriage with an architect, Vijay Khanna (Shashi Kapoor), against her wishes. Before ending their relationship, Pooja requests Amit to promise her that he will also get married and continue his poetry. Pooja and Vijay get married, and in a twist of fate, Vijay gifts Amit's first anthology book to Pooja on their marriage night for he is a big fan of Amit. While the couple is blessed with a son, Vikram, also known as Vicky, a heartbroken Amit gives up poetry and takes over the quarry company of his elderly father (Iftekhar). 20 years later, spanning over to the next generation, Pooja is shown to have become the host of a television show, where she surprisingly introduces Amit as a famous poet to the audience. This is the first time Amit and Pooja, the two ex-lovers, have reunited after several years, but as strangers. When asked why he stopped writing poetry, Amit responds by recalling how his sorrow drove him away. Seeing Amit and Pooja together, Vijay invites Amit home for a drink and accurately deduces that his discontinuance to poetry was caused by heartbreak, causing Amit to angrily storm off.

Meanwhile, the now-grownup Vicky (Rishi Kapoor) falls in love with Pinky (Neetu Singh), his college friend and the daughter of the Vijay's doctor, Dr. R. P. Kapoor (Parikshit Sahni), and his wife, Shobha (Simi Garewal). However, before the two can get married, Pinky learns the shocking truth about her adoption and her biological illegitimate mother. A shattered Pinky severs ties with Dr. Kapoor and Shobha and decides to track down her biological single mother and investigate the truth about her birth and abandonment. Pinky's search takes her to Kashmir and is finally able to meet with her mother, Anjali (Waheeda Rehman), who, as fate would have it, turns out to be none other than the wife of Amit. Shocked at seeing Pinky at her doorstep, Anjali secretly acknowledges her existence and showers her love on her reunited daughter. However, fearing for her marriage with Amit, she does not reveal their relationship to him and their daughter, Sweetie (Naseem). Instead, Anjali introduces Pinky as her distant niece from Delhi, leaving Pinky anguished as Anjali would not let her address her as her mother. To add to Pinky's troubles, Vicky, after being encouraged by Vijay, arrives in Kashmir in order to support her emotionally, but Pinky requests him to maintain his distance from her.

However, Vicky charms his way into Amit's household by flirting with Sweetie, so that he can continue to meet Pinky. Sweetie requests Amit to employ Vicky in his company, so that he can sustain himself while living in the town. Pinky begins working as Amit's secretary while Vicky is becomes the trolley operator by Rambhajan (Deven Verma), Amit's quarry supervisor. The situation further backfires when Sweetie falls in love with Vicky, due to which Anjali and Amit decide to arrange their marriage. As a result, Pinky confronts Vicky and instructs him not to play with Sweetie’s life and betray Amit and Anjali's trust in him. Anjali notices Pinky leaving from Vicky's guesthouse and questions her when Pinky confesses that Vicky is her fiancée. Understanding the situation, Anjali attempts to convince Amit that Vicky should be married to Pinky instead of Sweetie, but Amit responds by accusing Anjali of favouring Pinky over Sweetie. Realising that Pinky is more than just a "niece" to Anjali, Amit demands to know the truth about Pinky's identity, forcing Anjali to reveal that Pinky is her daughter from a premarital relationship. Pinky's biological father was a test pilot for the Indian Air Force, and was tragically killed in an airplane crash while Anjali was pregnant with Pinky, forcing her to give Pinky away for adoption to the childless Dr. Kapoor and Shobha. A horrified Amit becomes furious with both Anjali and Pinky and punishes them with silences for hiding their past "misdeeds" from him.

Later, Amit meet with an architect on his site, who turns out to be Vijay, Pooja's husband. As Amit visits Vijay and Pooja's house to take them home for dinner, he spends a few moments alone with Pooja, who realises that Amit never forgave or forgot her. Vijay overhears their conversation, and on the drive over, finds out that Pooja and Amit studied in the same college, and that Amit had written poetry in that period. He is shocked to realise that Amit's mysterious aforementioned heartbreak was none other than his own wife, Pooja. At home, after a drink, Vijay tells Amit that a man degrades himself by thinking about the past affairs of a woman who gave birth to his children and spent 20 years of her life with him. In a way, he accepts Pooja and shows Amit that he is being unreasonable towards Anjali, which is overheard by both Anjali and Pooja. Amit confesses his love for Pooja in front of Vijay, which hurts Anjali. After Pooja and Vijay leave, Anjali apologises to Amit for keeping the truth about Pinky a secret from him, but the male chauvinist Amit is unwilling to forgive Anjali's past, so Anjali decides to have a divorce.

Meanwhile, Sweetie witnesses an intimate moment between Vicky and Pinky, and still in love with Vicky and unaware of his engagement, she cries like a child and creates a scene, causing Amit to slap her, taking out his anger for Anjali on her. Feeling abandoned by everyone, Sweetie decides to commit suicide by riding her horse into one of the dynamite explosions at Amit's site. Vicky pursues her on horseback, while Amit and Pinky follow close behind on Amit's jeep, and Vijay on his motorbike. A spark from the explosion catches a pile of dry twigs, igniting a forest fire. Sweetie dismounts and runs into the fire, followed by Vicky who attempts to dissuade her, revealing that he and Pinky are already engaged, causing Sweetie to drop her anger and apologise to him and Pinky. Vijay rescues Pinky, while Amit rescues Vicky and Sweetie, and they all embrace. After the near-death experience, Amit realises his mistake and that he loves Pinky, and rushes back home to stop Anjali from leaving him. He arrives just in time, and they both tearfully reconcile, admitting that they do love each other. Amit and Pooja put the past behind them and become friends anew, while Pinky and Vicky get married.

== Cast ==
- Waheeda Rehman as Anjali Malhotra
- Shashi Kapoor as Vijay Khanna
- Amitabh Bachchan as Amit Malhotra
- Raakhee as Pooja Khanna
- Rishi Kapoor as Vikram Khanna (Vicky)
- Neetu Singh as Pinky Kapoor
- Naseem as Sweetie Malhotra
- Parikshit Sahni as Dr. R. P. Kapoor (Pinky's adoptive father)
- Simi Garewal as Shobha Kapoor (Pinky's adoptive mother)
- Iftekhar as Mr. Malhotra (Amit's father)
- Deven Verma as Rambhajan (Amit's quarry company manager)

== Production ==
The film's concept came to Yash Chopra while he was reading a poem by his longtime friend (and also the film's lyricist) Sahir Ludhianvi. The movie was shot in Kashmir, and Yash Chopra has claimed this to be one of his happiest experiences and he described the production as a "honeymoon", since the entire cast worked together as a family. The film also led to the reinvention of Amitabh Bachchan as a romantic poet who loses his love, which was a major departure from his earlier "angry-young-man" roles such as Zanjeer (1973), Sholay (1975) and Deewaar (1975). The film had been written with Raakhee in mind, and she had agreed to do it during the making of Daag: A Poem of Love (1973) but before production started she married lyricist Gulzar, who wanted her to retire from acting. However, after some persuasion from Yash Chopra, Gulzar let her do the film.

=== Crew ===
- Chief Assistant Director: Ramesh Talwar
- Art Direction: Desh Mukerji
- Costume Design: Jennifer Kapoor, Rajee Singh
- Choreography: Suresh Bhatt

== Soundtrack ==
The soundtrack was composed by Khayyam with lyrics by Sahir Ludhianvi, both of whom won Best Music and Best Lyricist at the 24th Filmfare Awards.

Kishore Kumar and Mukesh and performed vocals for Rishi Kapoor and Bachchan, respectively. Mukesh posthumously won his final Filmfare Award for Best Male Playback Singer for the title track, "Kabhi Kabhie Mere Dil Mein". The duet version of the song, sung by Mukesh and Lata Mangeshkar, topped the 1976 annual list of Radio Ceylon radio show, Binaca Geetmala.

The soundtrack was listed at #7 on PlanetBollywood.com's list of 100 Greatest Bollywood Soundtracks. Rakesh Budhu of PlanetBollywood.com gave 9.5 stars out of 10 stating, "Kabhi Kabhie will remain an ode to brilliant melody".

Kabhi Kabhie

Soundtrack album by Khayyam
- Released: 1976 (India)
- Genre: Film soundtrack
- Label: EMI
- Producer: Khayyam

Khayyam chronology
Sankalp (1975)	Kabhi Kabhie (1976)	Shankar Hussain (1977)

Professional ratings
Review scores
Source	Rating
PlanetBollywood.com	9.5/10 stars

No.	Title	Singer(s)	Length
1.	"Kabhi Kabhie Mere Dil Mein - I" (Raga Pahadi)	Mukesh	05:31
2.	"Kabhi Kabhie Mere Dil Mein - II" (Raga Pahadi)	Mukesh, Lata Mangeshkar	04:57
3.	"Kabhi Kabhi Mere Dil Mein – Dialogue"	Amitabh Bachchan	01:06
4.	"Main Pal Do Pal Ka Shayar Hoon"	Mukesh	04:08
5.	"Main Har Ek Pal Ka Shayar Hoon - II"	Mukesh	03:01
6.	"Tera Phoolon Jaisa Rang"	Kishore Kumar, Lata Mangeshkar	06:10
7.	"Mere Ghar Aaye Ek Nanhi Pari"	Lata Mangeshkar	03:17
8.	"Pyaar Kar Liya To Kya"	Kishore Kumar	03:43
9.	"Surkh Jode Ki Yeh Jagmagahat (Saada Chidiya Da Chamba Ve)"	Lata Mangeshkar, Pamela Chopra, Jagjit Kaur	03:45
10.	"Tere Chehre Se"	Kishore Kumar, Lata Mangeshkar	05:03

== Awards ==
24th Filmfare Awards:

Won

- Best Music Director – Khayyam
- Best Lyricist – Sahir Ludhianvi for "Kabhi Kabhie Mere Dil Mein"
- Best Male Playback Singer – Mukesh for "Kabhi Kabhie Mere Dil Mein"
- Best Dialogue – Sagar Sarhadi

Nominated

- Best Film – Yash Chopra
- Best Director – Yash Chopra
- Best Actor – Amitabh Bachchan
- Best Actress – Raakhee
- Best Supporting Actor – Shashi Kapoor
- Best Supporting Actress – Waheeda Rehman
- Best Lyricist – Sahir Ludhianvi for "Main Pal Do Pal Ka Shayar Hoon"
- Best Male Playback Singer – Mukesh for "Main Pal Do Pal Ka Shayar Hoon"
- Best Story – Pamela Chopra

== Home media ==
The DVD was released on 1 November 1999. The Blu-ray was released on 2 March 2010. It is available to stream on Netflix since 14 November 2025.
