= Sa-Re-Ga-Ma-Pa =

Sa-Re-Ga-Ma-Pa alias Jawani Mastani
- Directed by: Satyen Bose
- Produced by: Satyen Bose
- Starring: Ashok Kumar
- Production company: Bani Rupa Films
- Release date: 1972
- Country: India
- Language: Hindi

Sa-Re-Ga-Ma-Pa is a 1972 Hindi-language drama film directed by Satyen Bose and is written by Govind Moonis. The film stars Ashok Kumar, Praveen Paul, Vishal Anand and Alka in lead roles. The music was directed by Ganesh, brother of Pyarelal (of Laxmikant-Pyarelal). The songs were sung by famous play-back singers like Lata Mangeshkar, Mohammed Rafi, Kishore Kumar & Manna Dey. This film was originally released during the black & white cinema times.

== Cast ==
- Ashok Kumar as Seth Ghanshyamdas Choudhary
- Sahiraa in a spl.appearance
- Satyen Bose as Sakseria saheb
- Nazneen as Rekha Sharma
- Ruby Chouhan
- Alka as Savitri Sharma
- Suresh Chatwal as Assistant Manager
- Paintal as Sur Mohan's friend
- Vishal Anand as Govardhan
- Rupesh Kumar as Vijay Pratap Singh
- Jagdeep
- Nana Palsikar as B.M.Sharma
- Parveen Paul as Govardhan's Mother
- V Gopal as Jewelry Shop Owner
- Raj Mehra
- Jankidas
- Moolchand
- Pardesi as Maruti Peon
- Manik Dutt
- Darshan Lal as Inspector

== Crew ==
- Choreography: Badri Prasad
- Fight Composer: M B Shetty
- Art: G L Jadhav
- Editor: Mukhtar Ahmed
- Screenplay: Govind Moonis
- Dialogues: Govind Moonis
- Story: Ruby Bose
- Photography: Anil Mitra
- Lyrics: Majrooh Sultanpuri
- Music: Ganesh

== Soundtrack ==
The music of the film was composed by Ganesh, while lyrics were written by Majrooh Sultanpuri.

1. "Sanchi Kaho Moh Se Balma" – Kishore Kumar, Lata Mangeshkar
