= The Judas Tree =

1961 novel by A. J. Cronin

- First US edition
- Author: A. J. Cronin
- Language: English
- Publisher: Gollancz (UK); Little, Brown (USA)
- Publication date: 1961
- Publication place: United Kingdom
- Media type: Print (Hardcover & paperback)
- Pages: 345 pp. (UK hardcover edition)
- ISBN: 0-450-01393-6 (UK hardcover)

The Judas Tree is a 1961 novel by A. J. Cronin. It is considered one of the author's finest works and demonstrated a keen understanding of sin. Cronin described the book as "a complete dissection of a supreme egoist - a well-intentioned man who, through psychological and sociological influences, develops into a weak and self-indulgent heel who brings disaster on three different women and is himself destroyed by the fourth."

== Plot ==
The book begins with the story of David Moray, his early career as an ambitious young doctor away on business. He has promised to return to marry a woman he loves, Mary Douglas. Early on in the story he is introduced to successful people and is invited to accompany a prominent family on their ship as their personal physician. In doing so he breaks his promise to Mary and goes in another direction. Instead he briefly marries and divorces Doris, the daughter of the wealthy family he has befriended, whom he indicates was unsound mentally.

Later in David's life he is a wealthy, retired Scottish doctor living in Switzerland who is haunted by the memory of Mary. Attempting to go back to an earlier time, and too late, he returns home to seek her out and make amends. He learns that Mary has died and instead encounters her young, penniless daughter, Kathy, who is involved in mission work. He indulges in a friendship which evolves into more. Logically doubtful and not believing he can have a life with Kathy, David marries Frida, a countess whom he does not love. Not reading a letter Kathy sent, he is unaware Kathy believes they are soon to reunite. Awaiting their departure for a honeymoon cruise his ruminations are interrupted by a brief thought of the unopened letter. He then overhears his butler speaking to Kathy, who has just made a difficult journey to reach him. Overwhelmed that he could have been with her on his own terms at this location and not the mission, he is at a loss for words - David cannot explain that he has just married someone.

Frida asks to speak to Kathy alone, explaining that David found her by seeking her mother whom he failed to return for, and that David would never have returned to help her in her mission as a doctor. He needed a woman who would be strong enough to master him. Underestimating the reaction, Kathy runs out into the night to her accidental death.

Kathy was betrayed more by David's cynicism, doubt and lack of courage than by the ambition that detoured him years earlier, although that is still evidently present in his choosing a countess for social advantages.

In the end, distraught in his loss, David looks outward toward the garden and a Judas tree comes into focus. Dramatically he has not only failed his first love, but also her daughter, resulting in her death. It is not so much ironic as it is illustrative of the span of time in which he has made similar choices with consequences. The following morning his butler sees his body hanging from the tree.

Previously in the book, a Judas tree was referred to as "The Tree of Lost Souls." Some might assume David has realized at the end that he is a lost soul after having inflicted such misery on others due to his lack of morality. Others might infer the character is moral, clearly having a suffering conscience, and in hindsight merely took steps in the wrong direction.

== Theme ==
Betrayal is the dominant theme of The Judas Tree. Here despite and because of the protagonist, a pattern of betrayal is repeated. David betrayed Mary, Doris, his religion, and himself. These betrayals demanded - in Cronin's narrative - the ultimate price, which is death.

== Film versions ==
The 1975 Hindi film, Mausam, directed by Gulzar and starring Sharmila Tagore and Sanjeev Kumar, is loosely based on Cronin's novel.
