= Arjun Pandit (1976 film) =

- Directed by: Hrishikesh Mukherjee
- Written by: Balaichand Mukherjee
- Starring: Sanjeev Kumar; Ashok Kumar; Vinod Mehra; Srividya; Bindu
- Music by: Sachin Dev Burman
- Release date: 16 April 1976
- Country: India
- Language: Hindi

Arjun Pandit is a 1976 Hindi drama film directed by Hrishikesh Mukherjee. This film was based on a Bengali novel of Balai Chand Mukhopadhyay. The film's music is by Sachin Dev Burman.

== Cast ==
- Sanjeev Kumar as Arjun Sardar aka Arjun Pandit
- Ashok Kumar as Dr. Shukla
- Vinod Mehra as Vinod Shukla
- Sachin as Young Vinod Shukla
- Bindu as Mrs. Dr. Shukla
- Deven Verma as Narendra
- Keshto Mukherjee as Medical Examiner
- Sushil Bhatnagar
- Rajan Haksar as Zameendar Triloknath
- Shubha Khote as Rukmini

== Soundtrack ==
Arjun Pandit

Soundtrack album by S. D. Burman
- Released: April 16, 1976
- Genre: Feature film soundtrack
- Language: Hindi
- Producer: S. D. Burman

S. D. Burman chronology
Barood (1976)	Arjun Pandit (1976)	Deewaangee (1976)

#	Title	Singer(s)
1	"Dil Mera Uda Jaaye"	Kishore Kumar
2	"Bolo Pritam Kya Boli Thi Main"	Lata Mangeshkar
3	"Badalo Me Vadiyo Me"	Lata Mangeshkar

== Awards ==
24th Filmfare Awards:

Won

- Best Actor – Sanjeev Kumar
- Best Story – Balai Chand Mukhopadhyay

Nominated

- Best Supporting Actress – Bindu
- Best Comedian – Deven Verma
