= Adventures of Aladdin =

1978 film

- Directed by: Homi Wadia
- Based on: Arabian Nights
- Produced by: Homi Wadia
- Starring: Sachin; Nazneen; Jayshree T. Paintal; Raza Murad
- Music by: Chitragupta
- Production company: Basant Studios
- Release date: 9 November 1978
- Running time: 140 minutes
- Country: India
- Language: Hindi

Adventures of Aladdin (Aladdin and the Magic Lamp) is a 1978 adventure fantasy film produced and directed by Homi Wadia. This was the last film produced/directed by him. The film was a Basant Pictures production and starred Sachin, Nazneen, Jayshree T., Paintal, Raza Murad and Sudhir.

Homi Wadia turned to the Arabian Nights again for the story of Aladdin, after his earlier success with Aladdin Aur Jadui Chirag (1952). This time the film was in colour. It follows Aladdin's adventure with the magic lamp and his confrontation with the evil magician. This time the role was played by Sachin.

== Cast ==
- Sachin as Aladin
- Nazneen as Shehzadi
- Jayshree T. as Sophia
- Raza Murad as Jadugar Samri
- Paintal
- Sudhir
- Kanchan Mattu
- Prema Narayan.

== Production and Music ==
The special effects according to the credit roll of the film are attributed to "Basant Studio Special Effects Department under the supervision of Homi Wadia". The music was composed by Chitragupta with lyrics by Kafil Azar and Naqsh Lyallpuri. The singers were Mohammed Rafi, Asha Bhosle, Manna Dey and Anuradha Paudwal .

=== Songlist ===
Song	Singer
"Banda Parwar, Mohabbat Ka Salaam Le Lijiye, Nigahon Se Nigahon Ka Payam Le Lijiye"	Mohammed Rafi, Manna Dey, Anuradha Paudwal
"Ae Mere Humnawa, Tu Nahin Janta, Yeh Meri Aarzoo, Yeh Mera Khwab Tha"	Asha Bhosle, Mohammed Rafi
"Allah Allah, Main Abdullah, Saudagar Gulfam"	Asha Bhosle, Manna Dey
"Jadu Teri Nazar Ka Chal Hi Gaya Deewane"	Asha Bhosle
