= Mausam (1975 film) =

1975 film

- Poster
- Directed by: Gulzar
- Written by: Bhushan Banmali; Kamleshwar; Gulzar
- Based on: The Judas Tree by A.J. Cronin
- Produced by: P. Mallikharjuna Rao
- Starring: Sanjeev Kumar; Sharmila Tagore; Dina Pathak; Om Shivpuri; Satyen Kappu; C.S.Dubey; Lily Chakravarty
- Cinematography: K Vaikunth
- Edited by: Waman B. Bhosle; Gurudutt Shirali
- Music by: Songs: Madan Mohan; Background Score: Salil Chowdhury
- Release date: 29 December 1975
- Running time: 156 minutes
- Country: India
- Language: Hindi

Mausam (transl. Season) is a 1975 Indian Hindi-language musical romance film starring Sanjeev Kumar and Sharmila Tagore, and directed by Gulzar.

It is loosely based on the 1961 novel, The Judas Tree, by A.J. Cronin. Sharmila Tagore for her acting received The Silver Lotus Award at the 23rd National Film Festival and the film itself was awarded the Second Best Feature Film.

The film was nominated in eight categories at the 24th Filmfare Awards and won in two. The film also won many other accolades as well.

This film was remade in Tamil as Vasandhathil Or Naal.

== Plot ==
Mausam is the dramatic love story of Dr. Amarnath Gill, who falls for Chanda, the daughter of a local healer, Harihar Thapa, when visiting Darjeeling to prepare for his medical exams. Then he has to leave back to Calcutta for his final exams. He promises Chanda to return, though he never keeps his promise. Twenty-five years later, he returns as a wealthy man and searches for Chanda and her father. He learns that Harihar has died and that Chanda was married to a crippled old man. She gave birth to a daughter, became insane and died. Finding Chanda's daughter, Kajli, he sees that she closely resembles her mother and later discovers that after having been molested by her mother's brother-in-law, she ended up at a brothel. Amarnath had no choice but to buy her from the brothel and he takes Kajli home and tries to change her into a well-refined woman to make up for what he did to Chanda. Unaware that Amarnath is indirectly responsible for her mother's death, Kajli begins to fall in love with him. One day she is reminded of who she is and where she came from. Dressed back in her old revealing clothes as a prostitute she instigates Amarnath to throw her out, she goes back to the brothel. There the madam convinced her that Amarnath loves her and she should go back to him as he loves, giving her a respectable life. Kajli goes back to him awakening him in the night where she tries to embrace him. Amarnath always seeing her as a replica of Chanda and a daughter figure. Disgusted, Amarnath reveals to Kajli, he is the man that his mother waited all those years for and then went mad. Kajli upset runs away. The next morning Amarnath all packed up, leaving to go home, happens upon Kajli standing in the woods, with a picture of him when he was younger hidden behind her back. Kajli tells him it is his fault that her mother went mad and died and she became a prostitute. He tells her that yes he came back to this place to ask for her mother's forgiveness and maybe it's too late for Chanda but would she forgive him and be his daughter They then they drive off together, home.

== Cast ==
- Sanjeev Kumar as Dr. Amarnath Gill
- Sharmila Tagore as Chanda Thapa/Kajli
- Dina Pathak as Gangu Rani (Brothel madame)
- Om Shivpuri as Harihar Thapa

== Production ==
The film was written simultaneously along with Aandhi (1975), together by Kamleshwar, Bhushan Banmali and Gulzar, and even shot together, with Sanjeev Kumar playing the lead of an old man in the films. Though Aandhi was released first, it ran into political controversy and portions of it had to be reshot, meanwhile Mausam was completed and released. While the song, "Meri Ishq Ke Lakhon Jhatke" was being shot with Sharmila Tagore, choreographer Saroj Khan was also in the studios for another film, that is when Gulzar requested her to teach a few moves to Tagore.

== Music ==
The background score for the film was composed by Salil Chowdhury and the songs were composed by Madan Mohan. The film credits dedicate this movie to Madan Mohan after his death on 14 July 1975. The songs were penned by Gulzar. Mausam is one of those two movies directed by Gulzar, the songs of which were composed by Madan Mohan. The other one is Koshish. Gulzar stated that the song Dil Dhoondta Hai, "...one of his most memorable songs..."(Scroll.in, Aug 18, 2016) that he wrote in the film.

The song Dil Dhoondta Hai, by Lata Mangeshkar and Bhupinder Singh, featured at 12th position on the Annual list of the year-end chart toppers of Binaca Geetmala for 1976.

S. No.	Song	Singers	Picturised On
1	Dil Dhoondta Hai Phir Wohi Fursat Ke Raat Din (Sad)	Bhupinder Singh	title track
2	"Chhadi Re Chhadi"	Lata Mangeshkar, Mohammad Rafi	Sanjeev Kumar, Sharmila Tagore
3	Dil Dhoondta Hai Phir Wohi Fursat Ke Raat Din (Song based on Mirza Ghalib's original ghazal)	Lata Mangeshkar, Bhupinder Singh	Sanjeev Kumar, Sharmila Tagore
4	Mere Ishq Mein Laakhon Jhatke	Asha Bhosle	Sanjeev Kumar, Sharmila Tagore
5	"Ruke Ruke Se Qadam"	Lata Mangeshkar	Sharmila Tagore

== Awards ==
23rd National Film Awards:

Won

- Second Best Feature Film – Mausam
- Best Actress – Sharmila Tagore

24th Filmfare Awards:

Won

- Best Film – Mausam
- Best Director – Gulzar

Nominated

- Best Actor – Sanjeev Kumar
- Best Actress – Sharmila Tagore
- Best Supporting Actress – Dina Pathak
- Best Music Director – Madan Mohan
- Best Lyricist – Gulzar for "Dil Dhoondta Hai"
- Best Story – Kamleshwar
