= Kismet (1980 film) =

Kismat
- Directed by: Bhisham Kohli
- Produced by: Yash Kohli
- Starring: Mithun Chakraborty; Ranjeeta; Shakti Kapoor; Om Shivpuri
- Music by: Bappi Lahiri
- Release date: 19 December 1980
- Running time: 125 minutes
- Country: India
- Language: Hindi

Kismat is a 1980 Indian Hindi-language action drama film directed by Bhisham Kohli and produced by Yash Kohli. It stars Mithun Chakraborty, Ranjeeta, Shakti Kapoor, Om Shivpuri in pivotal roles.

== Plot ==
Ganga is a dancing girl. Her mother Yashoda is searching her all her life longed. Jeevan, a goon, separated Ganga from her mother. Moti falls in love with Ganga and give her a new life.

== Cast ==
- Mithun Chakraborty as Moti
- Ranjeeta as Ganga
- Shakti Kapoor as Jeevan
- Om Shivpuri as Khan
- Jalal Agha
- Urmila Bhatt
- Shivangi Kolhapure as Moti's Sister

== Soundtrack ==
Lyricist: Amit Khanna

Song	Singer
"Girke Sambhalte Hain Hum"	Kishore Kumar
"Kuch Chhup Chhupke"	Asha Bhosle
"Ek To Main Jawan"	Asha Bhosle
"Yeh Zindagi Chaman Hai"	K. J. Yesudas
"Masti Kahan Hai"	Manna Dey
"Mehboob Ki Mehbooba Ko"	Meena
