= Vishal Anand =

Indian actor (died 2020)

- Bhisham Kohli
- Vishal Anand
- Born: Mumbai
- Died: 4 October 2020
- Citizenship: Indian
- Occupations: Actor, producer
- Known for: Chalte Chalte (1976)

Vishal Anand (also known as Bhisham Kohli; died 4 October 2020) was an Indian actor and producer worked in Bollywood films.

== Career ==
Born in Mumbai, in the state of Maharashtra, India, he is known for his roles in Chalte Chalte (1976), Dil Se Mile Dil (1978) and Taxi Driver (1973). He was born Bhisham Kohli and was a member of the Anand Family. He appeared in 11 films in total, producing and directing a few of them by his real name Bhisham Kohli. He was nephew to Bollywood Legend Dev Anand. Dev's sister was Vishal's mother. Actor and former VJ Purab Kohli is his nephew (brother Harsh's son).

Major confusion occurred online between Vishal Anand (Hero in Chalte Chalte) and Bhisham Kohli on several websites. They are the same person. When Bhisham could not find any success as " Vishal Anand" he started using his real name. Anand's notable hit was Chalte Chalte, where he stars opposite Simi Garewal and Nazneen. This was also a film which he had produced. He is credited with giving music director Bappi Lahiri, his big break in Bollywood when he chose him as Chalte Chalte and Dil Se Mile Dil's music director. Vishal Anand died on 4 October 2020 due to prolonged illness.

== Filmography ==
- Hamara Adhikar (1970)
- Sa-Re-Ga-Ma-Pa (1972)
- Taxi Driver (1973)
- Intezaar (1973)
- Hindustan Ki Kasam (1973)
- Chalte Chalte (1976)
- Aap Ki Khatir (1977)
- Dil Se Mile Dil (1978)
- Kismet (1980)
- Maine Jeena Sikh Liya (1982)
- Aakheer (2007)
