= Bairaag =

- Directed by: Asit Sen
- Written by: S. Khalil; Abrar Alvi; Dr. Rahi Masoom Reza
- Produced by: Mushir-Riaz
- Starring: Dilip Kumar; Saira Banu; Leena Chandavarkar
- Cinematography: Kamal Bose
- Edited by: Tarun Dutta
- Music by: Kalyanji-Anandji
- Production company: M. R. Productions
- Release date: 22 October 1976
- Running time: 149 min
- Country: India
- Language: Hindi

Bairaag (transl. Renunciation) is a 1976 Hindi-language action thriller film directed by Asit Sen. Produced by the duo Mushir-Riaz, it stars Dilip Kumar in triple roles, with an ensemble cast of Saira Banu, Leena Chandavarkar, Helen, Prem Chopra, Madan Puri, Sujit Kumar, Kader Khan, Paintal, Mukri, Asit Sen, P. Jairaj and Ruma Guha Thakurta. Its music is by the duo Kalyanji-Anandji, who received a Filmfare nomination for Best Music. The film received a Filmfare Award for Best Sound for P. Harikishan. The film failed to perform at the box office. It was Dilip Kumar's third consecutive failure at box-office, the first and only time in his career since Milan (1946). After this film, he went on a hiatus, returning after 4 years in Kranti (1981).

== Plot ==
Kailashnath loses his eyesight after a car accident. His wife Pushpa gives birth to twin boys, one of them blind. Before his wife gains consciousness, he asks his doctor friend to get rid of the blind baby, because he doesn't want his son to live a life where he can't see at all. The doctor's wife leaves the blind baby in a Hindu temple, where he is discovered by the temple priest who raises the boy, now called Bholenath. Kailashnath feels guilty about what he did to the blind baby and confesses it to his wife several years later. She becomes so distraught that she dies.

Kailashnath raises his other son Sanjay, who turns into a spoiled rich boy. Although Sanjay is engaged to Sonia, he continues to have an affair with Lucy, who has a rich dangerous boyfriend Crasto. Sonia's greedy brother Kumar Pratap Singh agrees to marry a country girl Tara but wants a Rs. 3,00,000 dowry. She doesn't want to marry him, because she is in love with Bholenath, even though he is poor and blind.

Bholenath thinks that his status is beneath hers and that she deserves a rich suitor. He steals the money from the Hindu temple to give to Kumar for her dowry. His pet snake tries to stop him from giving the money by biting him. He regains his sight and vows to the temple priest and Tara to bring the money back from Kumar. Once he reaches the city, people mistake him for Sanjay, who in turn, is hiding out with Lucy after she leaves Crasto along with Rs. 15,00,000. She is found dead with the money missing. Sanjay is the suspect. The film is resolved with the real culprit getting caught, the two brothers reunited with their father and then marrying their sweethearts.

== Cast ==
- Dilip Kumar as Kailashnath / Bholenath "Bhola" / Sanjay (Triple Role)
- Saira Banu as Tara
- Leena Chandavarkar as Sonia
- Helen as Lucy
- Prem Chopra as Kumar Pratap Singh
- Madan Puri as Crasto
- Sujit Kumar as Sugana
- Kader Khan as Superintendent of Police
- Nasir Khan as Dr. Mishra
- Praveen Paul as Mrs. Mishra
- Ruma Guha Thakurta as Pushpa
- Nazir Hussain as Priest
- Paintal as Bobby
- Mukri as Vimla's Father
- Naaz as Vimla
- Purnima as Saraswati
- P. Jairaj as Thakur Chandrabhan
- Leela Mishra as Tara's Aunty

== Reception and release ==
Bairaag, released in 1976, was the last film of Dilip Kumar as hero, after which he took a five-year break from films and returned to play character roles thereafter. Although it failed at the box office, the critics appreciated it. Dilip Kumar was acclaimed for his triple role and received a Filmfare nomination for Best Actor.

His next films were Kranti (directed by Manoj Kumar), Shakti (directed by Ramesh Sippy) and Vidhaata (directed by Subhash Ghai), where Kumar played role of mature characters, leaving romantic roles for younger artists.

== Awards ==
24th Filmfare Awards:

Won

- Best Sound Design – P. Harikishan

Nominated

- Best Actor – Dilip Kumar
- Best Music Director – Kalyanji–Anandji

== Soundtrack ==
The music was composed by Kalyanji-Anandji. The lyrics were by Anand Bakshi.

Song	Singer
"O Shankar Mere" - 1	Mahendra Kapoor
"O Shankar Mere" - 2	Mahendra Kapoor
"Chhoti Si Umar Mein Hi Lag Gaya Rog"	Lata Mangeshkar
"Main Bairaagi Naachun Gaaun"	Mohammed Rafi, Lata Mangeshkar
"Saare Shaher Mein Aap Sa Koi Nahin"	Mohammed Rafi, Asha Bhosle
"Peete Peete Kabhi Kabhi Yun Jaam Badal Jaate Hai"	Mohammed Rafi, Asha Bhosle
