= Nazneen =

Indian fulm actress (born 1958)

- Born: Nazneen; 23 February 1958 (age 68); Calcutta, West Bengal, India
- Occupation: Actress
- Years active: 1972–1990
- Known for: Sa-Re-Ga-Ma-Pa; Chalte Chalte; Mahabharat
- Relatives: Mumtaz Begum (aunt)

Nazneen (born 23 February 1958) is an Indian Bollywood actress who was active in the 1970s and 1980s.

== Early Life ==
She was born on 23 February 1958 in Calcutta and studied in Lucknow before moving to Mumbai with her parents. She was cast in Sa-Re-Ga-Ma-Pa (1972) after meeting an assistant to director Satyen Bose at a party. She subsequently played in the hit films Kora Kagaz (1974), Chalte Chalte (1976) and Dildaar (1977). Nazneen starred in the hit television series Mahabharat produced by B.R Chopra as Kunti, the mother of the Pandava brothers.

Nazneen was born into a Muslim family. Her father owned a printing press. She did her schooling from Hill Grange High School. Actress Neetu Singh went to the same school as her. Neetu used to invite her to her mother's flat for lunch.

Her aunt was the actress Mumtaz Begum.

== Career ==
At a party hosted by a relative of hers, producer Yusuf Teendarwajawalla, who made Mere Humsafar (1970), and director Satyen Bose offered her a role in Sa-Re-Ga-Ma-Pa (1972), which he directed.

Nazneen was signed for two more films to be directed by Satyen Bose but they were never made. But working under the veteran director did help her a lot. Satyen Bose also wanted Nazneen to have a screen name. He had suggested Suparna, and then somebody suggested Sonali. However, she chose to be herself, Nazneen.

In 1974 she acted in Kora Kagaz, which won her critical acclaim. In the film she played Jaya Bachchan's sister. After Kora Kaagaz she got several offers, but everyone said "there was a wonderful role of a sister". "They all thought I was good only for goody-goody roles", Nazneen said in an interview conducted in 1976.

Nazneen declined all those offers. She was already playing the leading lady in a few "B" class films and the producers of these films told Nazneen if she accepted the sisters’ roles their films would suffer at the box office. She played role of Zeenat Mahal, wife of Bahadurshah Jafar in doordarshan TV serial titled Bahadurshah Zafar, produced and directed by veteran film maker B. R. Chopra.

== Filmography ==
Year	Title	Role	Language	Notes
1972	Sa-Re-Ga-Ma-Pa		Hindi	Debut film
1972	Jawani Diwani		Hindi	
1972	Jai Jwala		Hindi	
1973	Mere Gharib Nawaz		Hindi	
1973	Nirdosh		Hindi	
1974	Naya Din Nai Raat		Hindi	
1974	Kora Kagaz		Hindi	
1974	Call Girl		Hindi	
1974	Woh Main Nahin		Hindi	
1975	Ranga Khush		Hindi	
1975	Phanda		Hindi	
1975	Andolan		Hindi	
1976	Chalte Chalte		Hindi	
1976	Fauji		Hindi	
1976	Yaari Zindabad		Hindi	
1977	Pandit Aur Pathan		Hindi	
1977	Chaalu Mera Naam		Hindi	
1977	Dildaar		Hindi	
1977	Haiwan		Hindi	
1978	Adventures of Aladdin		Hindi	
1979	Bin Phere Hum Tere		Hindi	
1979	Sukhi Pariwar		Punjabi	
1980	Ram Balram		Hindi	Guest Appearance
1980	Oh Bewafaa		Hindi	
1981	Ek Duuje Ke Liye		Hindi	
1981	Ek Hi Bhool		Hindi	
1981	Khuda Kasam	Geeta Singh	Hindi	
1981	Waqt Ki Deewar		Hindi	
1982	Chambal Ke Daku		Hindi	
1982	Do Ustad		Hindi	
1983	Shekhar Mera Naam		Hindi	
1983	Chor Police	Soni	Hindi	
1986	Aadamkhor		Hindi	
1989	Ajeeb Ittefaq		Hindi	

=== Television ===
- Mahabharat as Kunti (TV Series)
- Bahadur Shah Jafar as Zeenat Mahal.
