= Fakira =

1976 Hindi film by C.P. Dixit

- Poster
- Directed by: C.P. Dixit
- Written by: S. M. Abbas; R.K. Bannerjee; Dhruva Chatterjee
- Produced by: N.N. Sippy
- Starring: Shashi Kapoor; Shabana Azmi; Asrani; Aruna Irani; Danny Dengzongpa; Iftekhar
- Cinematography: Fali Mistry
- Edited by: Waman B. Bhosle; Gurudutt Shirali
- Music by: Ravindra Jain
- Release date: 6 September 1976
- Country: India
- Language: Hindi
- Box office: ₹5 crore

Fakira is a 1976 Indian Hindi-language crime action film produced by N.N. Sippy and directed by C.P. Dixit. The film stars Shashi Kapoor, Shabana Azmi, Asrani, Aruna Irani, Danny Denzongpa, Asit Sen, Ramesh Deo and Madan Puri. The music is by Ravindra Jain. The film became a box office hit and emerged as the 6th highest grossing film of the year. The film's team of producer (N.N. Sippy), cast (Shashi Kapoor, Asrani, Danny Denzongpa, Madan Puri) and music composer (Ravindra Jain) had teamed together before for the box office hit Chor Machaye Shor (1974). Fakira was later remade into the Telugu film Dongalaku Donga (1978).

== Plot ==
Two small children, who are brothers, lose their parents in a fire. They are harassed by bad men and get separated. They grow up and become criminals. One is played by Shashi Kapoor, while the other is played Danny Denzongpa. They become enemies, not knowing that they are brothers. A policewoman, played by Shabana Azmi, goes undercover in Shashi Kapoor's criminal group, which includes Asrani and Aruna Irani. She and Shashi Kapoor fall in love, but Aruna Irani doesn't trust her as she loves Shashi Kapoor herself. Madan Puri is the villain.

== Cast ==
- Shashi Kapoor as Vijay / Nawab Jhumritalaya / Fakira
- Shabana Azmi as Neeta / Geeta
- Danny Denzongpa as Ajay / Toofan
- Asrani as Popat
- Aruna Irani as Neelam
- Madan Puri as Chiman Lal

== Soundtrack ==
All lyrics are written by Ravindra Jain except the song - Aadhi Sachchi Aadhi Jhuthi Teri Prem Kahaani - which is written by Inderjeet Singh Tulsi.

1. "Tota Maina Ki Kahaani To Puraani Puraani Ho Gayi" - Kishore Kumar, Lata Mangeshkar
2. "Hum To Jhukkar Salaam Karte Hain" (Qawwali) - Kishore Kumar, Mahendra Kapoor, Aziz Nazan, Bhushan Mehta
3. "Dil Men Tujhe Bithake, Kar Loongi Main Bandh Aankhen" - Lata Mangeshkar
4. "Fakira Chal Chala Chal" (Sunke Teri Pukar) - Mahendra Kapoor
5. "Akela Chal Re Ho Fakira Chal Re" (Sunke Teri Pukar) - Hemlata
6. "Aadhi Sachchi Aadhi Jhuthi Teri Prem Kahaani" - Mohammed Rafi, Lata Mangeshkar
7. "Yeh Mera Jaadu, Chor Ho Ya Sadhu" - Asha Bhosle

The song "Dil Men Tujhe Bithake" is set in the Hindustani raga Bhimpalasi.

== Accolades ==
24th Filmfare Awards:

Won

- Best Cinematography – Fali Mistry
- Best Art Direction – S. S. Samel

Nominated

- Best Male Playback Singer – Mahendra Kapoor for "Sunke Teri Pukar"
- Best Female Playback Singer – Hemlata for "Sunke Teri Pukar"
