= Tapasya (1976 film) =

- Directed by: Anil Ganguly
- Written by: M. G. Hashmat (dialogues)
- Screenplay by: Anil Ganguly
- Story by: Ashapurna Devi
- Based on: Baluchori (1968)
- Produced by: Tarachand Barjatya; Rajshree Productions
- Starring: Raakhee; Parikshat Sahni; Asrani; A. K. Hangal; Nazir Hussain
- Cinematography: Dilip Ranjan Mukhopadhyay
- Edited by: Mukhtar Ahmed
- Music by: Ravindra Jain
- Distributed by: Rajshri Pictures
- Release date: 1976
- Country: India
- Language: Hindi

Tapasya (transl. Penance) is a 1976 Indian Hindi-language romantic drama directed by Anil Ganguly and produced by Tarachand Barjatya for Rajshree Productions.

The film stars Raakhee in the lead role with Parikshat Sahni, Lalita Pawar, Nazir Hussain, A. K. Hangal, and Asrani. The film's music is provided by Ravindra Jain. It won the National Film Award for Best Popular Film Providing Wholesome Entertainment for the year.

== Cast ==
- Raakhee as Indrani Sinha
- Parikshit Sahni as Dr. Sagar Varma
- Asrani as Vinod Sinha
- A. K. Hangal as Chandranath Sinha
- Gayatri as Chanda Sinha
- Manju Asrani
- Om Shivpuri
- Lalita Pawar
- Urmila Bhatt
- Nazir Hussain
- Viju Khote
- C. S. Dubey
- Sunder
- Manju Bhatia as Pinky
- Lalita Kumari
- Birbal
- Shubhari Devi as Shubham Kaushik

== Music ==
All lyrics are written by M. G. Hashmat; all music is composed by Ravindra Jain.

Songs
No.	Title	Playback	Length
1.	"Do Panchhi Do Tinke"	Kishore Kumar, Aarti Mukherjee	3:44
2.	"Jo Raah Chuni Tune"	Kishore Kumar	6:13
3.	"Bachcho Tum Ho Khel Khilone"	Aarti Mukherjee	3:58
4.	"Bhabhi Ki Unglee Mein"	Hemlata, Chandrani Mukherjee	5:01

== Awards ==
24th Filmfare Awards:

Won

- Best Actress – Raakhee

Nominated

- Best Film – Rajshri Productions
- Best Story – Ashapoorna Devi

23rd National Film Awards:

- National Film Award for Best Popular Film Providing Wholesome Entertainment – Anil Ganguly
