= Nagin (1976 film) =

1976 Indian film by Rajkumar Kohli

- Theatrical release poster
- Directed by: Rajkumar Kohli
- Screenplay by: Jaggiram Paul; Charandas Shokh
- Story by: Rajendra Singh
- Produced by: Rajkumar Kohli
- Starring: Reena Roy; Sunil Dutt; Feroz Khan; Jeetendra; Sanjay Khan; Rekha; Mumtaz; Kabir Bedi
- Edited by: Shyam
- Music by: Laxmikant Pyarelal
- Production company: Shankar Movies
- Release date: 19 January 1976
- Running time: 190 minutes
- Country: India
- Language: Hindi

Nagin (transl. Female Serpent) is a 1976 Hindi-language horror film, produced and directed by Rajkumar Kohli, under the Shankar Movies banner. It stars Reena Roy in the title role alongside an ensemble cast of Sunil Dutt, Feroz Khan, Jeetendra, Sanjay Khan, Rekha, Mumtaz, Vinod Mehra, Yogeeta Bali, Kabir Bedi and Anil Dhawan; its music was composed by Laxmikant Pyarelal. Despite being a fantasy type film, it was a blockbuster at the box office and the highest-grossing film of 1976. Following the success of the film, Reena Roy attained star status.

It was inspired by François Truffaut's 1968 French film The Bride Wore Black, which was based on Cornell Woolrich's 1940 novel of the same name. The film was later remade in Tamil as Neeya? (1979), with Sripriya playing Nagin.

== Cast ==
- Reena Roy as Naagin
- Sunil Dutt as Vijay
- Feroz Khan as Raj
- Jeetendra as Naag
- Sanjay Khan as Suraj
- Rekha as Sunita, Vijay's fiancée
- Mumtaz as Rajkumari, Raj's fiancée
- Kabir Bedi as Uday
- Vinod Mehra as Rajesh
- Anil Dhawan as Kiran
- Neelam Mehra as Sheela, Uday's wife
- Yogeeta Bali as Rita, Rajesh's fiancée
- Prema Narayan
- Komilla Wirk as Raj's Sister
- Roopesh Kumar as Raj's Brother-in-law
- Ranjeet
- Aruna Irani as Rajesh and Rita's Friend
- Premnath as Sapera
- Jagdeep as Surmabhopali Sapera
- Sulochana Latkar as Rajesh's Mother
- Anita Guha as Sunita's Mother
- Heena Kausar
- Tun Tun as Suraj's Maid
- Master Bittoo as Suraj's daughter

== Soundtrack ==
All music composed by Laxmikant–Pyarelal, all lyrics written by Verma Malik.

| No. | Title | Singer(s) | Length |
|---|---|---|---|
| 1. | "Tere Mera, Mera Tera Mil Gaya Dil Dil Se" | Kishore Kumar, Suman Kalyanpur |
| 2. | "Tere Sang Pyar Main Nahin Todna" (Sad) | Lata Mangeshkar |
| 3. | "Tere Sang Pyar Main Nahin Todna" (Duet) | Lata Mangeshkar, Mahendra Kapoor |
| 4. | "Hafte Mahine Barson Nahin, Sadiyon Se Hai Yeh Purane" | Lata Mangeshkar, Mohammed Rafi |
| 5. | "Tere Ishq Ka Mujh Pe Hua Yeh Asar Hai" | Asha Bhosle, Mohammed Rafi |
| 6. | "Tere Sang Pyar Main Nahin Todna" (Solo) | Lata Mangeshkar |

"Tere Sang Pyar Main Nahin Todna" was reused in Nagin's Tamil remake, Neeya, and was featured in the soundtrack of the 2004 film Eternal Sunshine of the Spotless Mind.
