= Chalte Chalte (1976 film) =

1976 Hindi film

- Film poster
- Directed by: Sunder Dar
- Written by: Sunder Dar
- Screenplay by: Sunder Dar
- Story by: Anmol Purohit
- Produced by: Bhisham Kohli
- Starring: Vishal Anand; Simi Garewal
- Cinematography: Chaman K. Bajoo
- Edited by: Ravi Patnaik
- Music by: Bappi Lahiri
- Release date: 22 October 1976
- Running time: 117 minutes (1 hour 57 minutes)
- Country: India
- Language: Hindi
- Budget: 11,00,00,000
- Box office: 30,15,00,000

Chalte Chalte (transl. On the Way) is a 1976 Indian Hindi-language musical romantic thriller film directed by Sunder Dar and produced by Bhisham Kohli. It stars Vishal Anand (Bhisham Kohli's screen name) and Simi Garewal in pivotal roles. The film was noted for its songs by Bappi Lahiri, and the title song, "Chalte Chalte" sung by Kishore Kumar, was part of the Binaca Geetmala annual list 1976. It was a superhit at the box office.

== Plot ==
Geeta and a young man are in love and want to get married. Tragically, the young man dies, leaving Geeta devastated and in shock, who eventually loses her senses and is confined to a mental hospital. Years later, Geeta recovers and is discharged, only to find that the man she thought was dead is still alive, calls himself Ravi, and is in love with a lovely young woman named Asha. Unable to deal with this, Geeta decides to make Ravi her own. However, when her attempts fail, she is re-confined in the mental hospital. Ravi decides to travel abroad, leaving Asha alone. Geeta escapes and gains entry into the house, intending to eliminate Asha, whom she blames for Ravi losing interest in her. Geeta tries to kill Asha, which ultimately leads to her own death when she falls off the roof. The film ends with Ravi consoling Asha, while the background music "Chalte Chalte" plays.

== Cast ==
- Vishal Anand...Ravi Kapoor (Anil)
- Simi Garewal...Geeta
- Nazneen...Asha
- Shreeram Lagoo...Dr. Roy
- Jagdish Raj...Inspector
- Jankidas...Dr. Jankidas
- Ratan Gaurang...Bahadur

== Soundtrack ==
The film's soundtrack contains 7 songs. The music is composed by Bappi Lahiri, with lyrics by Amit Khanna.

"Chalte Chalte" is considered one of the most loved film songs of all time. One of the lines from that song inspired the name of the 2006 film Kabhi Alvida Naa Kehna.

Title	Singer(s)	Lyricist	Length
"Chalte Chalte"	Kishore Kumar	Amit Khanna	5.18
"Chalte Chalte (Sad)"	Kishore Kumar	Amit Khanna	2:24
"Dur Dur Tum Rahe"	Lata Mangeshkar	Amit Khanna	5:24
"Jaana Kahan Hai"	Bappi Lahiri, Sulakshana Pandit	Amit Khanna	6:38
"Pyar Mein Kabhi Kabhi"	Shailendra Singh, Lata Mangeshkar	Amit Khanna	5:20
"Sapnon Ka Raja"	Shailendra Singh, Sulakshana Pandit	Amit Khanna	5:57
"Chalte Chalte (Instrumental)"	Bappi Lahiri	Amit Khanna	2:52
