= Kabhi Kabhie Mere Dil Mein =

1976 song performed by Mukesh

Song by Mukesh and Lata Mangeshkar

from the album Kabhi Kabhie
- Language: Urdu
- Released: 1976
- Recorded: Mehboob Studio, Bandra(W), Mumbai, India
- Genre: Film score
- Length: 4:45
- Label: Saregama
- Composer: Khayyam
- Lyricist: Sahir Ludhianvi
- Producer: Khayyam

"Kabhi Kabhie Mere Dil Mein" (transl. Sometimes..in My Heart) is the title song of the 1976 Hindi film Kabhi Kabhie directed by Yash Chopra. The title song of the film written by Sahir Ludhianvi was performed by Mukesh and Lata Mangeshkar.

The song was recorded at Mehboob Studio of noted producer-director, Mehboob Khan, and remains one of the finest creations of both its music director and lyricist, both of whom later won Filmfare Awards in their respective categories.

== About the song ==
Kabhi Kabhie Mere Dil Mein sample music
A 28 seconds sample of the popular song "Kabhi Kabhie Mere Dil Mein.ogg".

This song is regarded to have been a masterpiece by lyricist Sahir Ludhianvi. The original song is in literary Urdu and was in fact a poem from his collection Talkhiyan. The version used in the movie Kabhi Kabhie used simpler words.

This music for this song was composed by Khayyam and sung by Mukesh. The song was originally created by Khayyam for an unreleased film made in 1950 by Chetan Anand. The song was recorded by Geeta Dutt and Sudha Malhotra. However this song was never released.

== Music video ==
This song features Bollywood star Amitabh Bachchan and Raakhee, and shot in Kashmir, during the winter season.

== Versions ==
The original literary version was significantly modified to create a version which is more sentimental and lyrical.

The original literary version:
Kabhi Kabhi mere dil mein khayaal aataa hai
Ki zindagi teri zulfon ki narm chhaaon mein
Guzarne paati to shaadaab ho bhi sakti thi
Yeh tiraagi jo mere zist ka muqaddar hai
Teri nazar ki shuaon mein kho bhi sakti thi

The movie version is:
Kabhi Kabhi Mere Dil Me, Khayal Aata Hai
Ke Jaise Tujhko Banaya Gaya Hai Mere Liye (x2)
Tu Ab Se Pahle Sitaro Me Bas Rahi Thi Kahi
Tujhe Zameen Pe bhoolaya Gaya Hai Mere Liye (x2)

The song has another version in soundtrack, wherein the opening verses are recited by Amitabh Bachchan as he does in the film, during the TV interview scene with Raakhee, and then cuts to the song playing in flashback.

Yet another version, where it is a duet between Mukesh and Lata Mangeshkar, was picturized on the wedding night scene of Pooja (Rakhee) and Vijay Khanna (Shashi Kapoor). This version topped the year end Annual list 1976 of Radio Ceylon radio show, Binaca Geetmala. Previously in the film, poet Amit (Amitabh Bachchan), presents his first book of verse titled Kabhie Kabhie to his beloved Pooja as a wedding gift after she tells him that her parents have decided to marry her off to an industrialist's son, and Amit turns out to be Pooja's husband's favourite poet and he recites the song to her on their wedding night.

The song was later resung and remixed by Dal Hothi, followed many years later by a remixed version by Bally Sagoo.

The melody was allegedly taken for the 1985 Indonesian song Khayalan Masa Lalu "Imaginations of the Past", sung by Ida Laila.

== Awards ==
- 1977: Filmfare Award
  - Best Music: Khayyam
  - Best Lyricist: Sahir Ludhianvi: "Kabhi Kabhie Mere Dil Mein"
  - Best Male Playback Singer: Mukesh: "Kabhi Kabhie Mere Dil Mein"
