= Amitabh Bachchan filmography =

Amitabh Bachchan is an Indian actor, playback singer, film producer, television host and former politician who primarily works in Hindi films. He made his acting debut in 1969 with the film Saat Hindustani for which he won his 1st National Award for Best Newcomer and also narrated Mrinal Sen's Bhuvan Shome, that same year. He later appeared as Dr. Bhaskar Banerjee in Hrishikesh Mukherjee's Anand (1971), for which he won the Filmfare Award for Best Supporting Actor. In 1973, Bachchan played his breakthrough role of Inspector Vijay Khanna in Prakash Mehra's action film Zanjeer. He has since appeared in many films playing characters with the name "Vijay". That same year, he appeared in Abhimaan and Namak Haraam. For the latter, he received the Filmfare Award for Best Supporting Actor. He starred along with Shashi Kapoor in Yash Chopra's Deewaar, in 1975, which earned him widespread critical acclaim and popularity and also earned him a Filmfare Award for Best Actor nomination. He was cited as the "angry young man" for his roles in Zanjeer and Deewaar. That same year, he also starred in Ramesh Sippy's Sholay, which is considered to be one of the greatest Indian films of all time. After appearing in the romantic drama Kabhie Kabhie (1976), Bachchan starred in Manmohan Desai's highest grosser action-comedy Amar Akbar Anthony (1977). He again won the Filmfare Award for Best Actor for his performance in the latter. He then played dual roles of Don and Vijay in Don (1978), which again earned him the Filmfare Award for Best Actor for the second consecutive year. All three films were huge blockbusters.

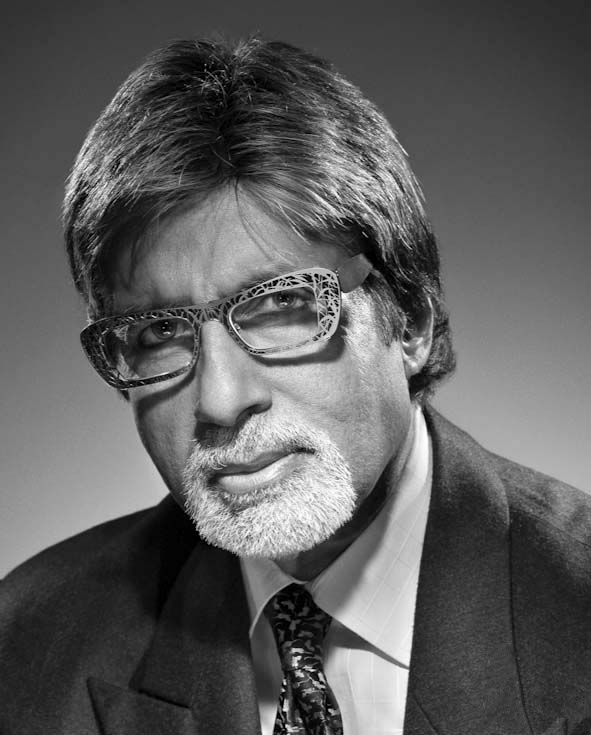
Studio publicity photograph of Bachchan in 2009

Bachchan's stardom continued to roar in the early 1980s and his critically and commercially successful films from this period include Dostana (1980), Shaan (1980), Ram Balram (1980), Naseeb (1981), Lawaaris (1981), Kaalia (1981), Yaarana (1981), Satte Pe Satta (1982), Shakti (1982), Namak Halaal (1982), Khud-Daar (1982), Andha Kanoon (1983) and Coolie (1983). His performances in films like Dostana and Shakti earned him many nominations for the Filmfare Award for Best Actor. He suffered a near-fatal injury while shooting for Coolie. His workload decreased for the upcoming four years (1984–1988), but he found great commercial and critical success with the films Sharaabi (1984), Geraftaar (1985) and Mard (1985). In 1988, he returned to the screen with the box-office success Shahenshah. Two years later in 1990, Bachchan played the role of gangster Vijay Deenanath Chauhan in Mukul S. Anand's Agneepath, which earned him the National Film Award for Best Actor and later starred in Hum (1991), which was a commercial success. Despite being a box-office failure, the former garnered him the National Film Award for Best Actor and has since developed a cult status. He also won a Filmfare Award for Best Actor for Hum, following which he took another break from acting. He then played the role of Badshah Khan in Anand's 1992 drama Khuda Gawah, for which he received a civilian award from the President of Afghanistan. Khuda Gawah, was also a critical and commercial success and Bachchan's performance was well received both domestically and internationally. In 1996, he started his film production company Amitabh Bachchan Corporation whose first film Tere Mere Sapne (1996) was a box-office hit. Bachchan is also known as the "Shahenshah" or "Big B" of Bollywood.

In 2000, Bachchan appeared in a widely acclaimed supporting role in Aditya Chopra's Mohabbatein, for which he won the Filmfare Award for Best Supporting Actor. That same year, he made his television debut as the host of the game show Kaun Banega Crorepati. He has since hosted its every season, except for season 3. He then played the roles of a short-tempered banker in Aankhen (2002), a disillusioned father in Baghban (2003), and a conflicted cop in Khakee (2004). In 2005, he played the role of a teacher of a blind and deaf girl in Sanjay Leela Bhansali's Black, for which he received the National Award and the Filmfare Award for Best Actor. He received another National Award for Best Actor for playing a progeria patient in R. Balki's Paa (2009). He also portrayed the title character of a friendly ghost in Bhoothnath (2008) and its sequel Bhoothnath Returns (2014) and also played a hypochondriac in the comedy-drama Piku (2015). It earned him his fourth National Film Award for Best Actor.

Bachchan has also narrated many films including Shatranj Ke Khilari (1977), Lagaan (2001), Parineeta (2005), Jodhaa Akbar (2008), Ra.One (2011) and Krrish 3 (2013). He has also been a playback singer in many films like Laawaris, Silsila and Baghban. In 2024, Amazon Prime Video released a three-part documentary series about the Salim–Javed screenwriting duo titled Angry Young Men. The series explores their creative partnership, their influence on the evolution of Indian cinema, and the role that Bachchan played in personifying the "angry young man" of their films.

== Films ==
Key
†	Denotes films that have not yet been released

=== Acting credits ===
Year	Title	Role	Notes	Ref.
1969	Saat Hindustani	Anwar Ali		
1969	Bhuvan Shome	–	Narrator	
1970	Bombay Talkie	Man attending funeral	English film; uncredited role	
1971	Anand	Dr. Bhaskar Banerjee	Filmfare Award for Best Supporting Actor; Also playback singer for "Maut Tu Ek Kavita Hai"	
1971	Pyar Ki Kahani	Ram Chandra		
1971	Parwana	Kumar Sen		
1971	Reshma Aur Shera	Chhotu		
1971	Guddi	Himself	Cameo appearance	
1971	Piya Ka Ghar	Unknown	Cameo appearance	
1972	Sanjog	Mohan		
1972	Bombay to Goa	Ravi Kumar		
1972	Ek Nazar	Manmohan Tyagi (Akash)		
1972	Bansi Birju	Birju		
1972	Raaste Kaa Patthar	Jaishankar Rai		
1972	Bawarchi	–	Narrator	
1972	Garam Masala	Robert Taylor	Special appearance	
1972	Jaban	Dalaljit	Special appearance	
1973	Bandhe Haath	Shyamu / Deepak (Note: He played dual roles.)		
1973	Zanjeer	Inspector Vijay Khanna	Nominated—Filmfare Award for Best Actor	
1973	Gehri Chaal	Ratan		
1973	Abhimaan	Subir Kumar		
1973	Saudagar	Motallam (Moti)		
1973	Namak Haraam	Vikram (Vicky) Maharaj	Filmfare Award for Best Supporting Actor	
1973	Naya Nasha	–	Narrator	
1973	Bada Kabutar	Himself	Special appearance	
1974	Kasauti	Amitabh (Amit) Sharma		
1974	Parinay	–	Narrator	
1974	Roti Kapda Aur Makaan	Vijay		
1974	Benaam	Amitabh (Amit) Shrivastav		
1974	Majboor	Ravi Khanna		
1974	Dost	Anand	Guest appearance	
1974	Kunwara Baap	Anthony	Guest appearance	
1974	Kaasdaya Kandane	–	Tulu film; voiceover	
1975	Deewaar	Vijay Verma	Nominated—Filmfare Award for Best Actor	
1975	Zameer	Badal Singh / Fake Chimpoo		
1975	Chupke Chupke	Professor Sukumar Sinha (Kumar)		
1975	Mili	Shekhar Dayal		
1975	Sholay	Jaidev (Jai)		
1975	Faraar	Rajesh (Raj)		
1976	Kabhi Kabhie	Amitabh Malhotra (Amit)	Nominated—Filmfare Award for Best Actor; Also playback singer for the song "Kabhi Kabhie Mere Dil Mein"	
1976	Hera Pheri	Vijay		
1976	Do Anjaane	Amit Roy / Naresh Dutt		
1976	Chhoti Si Baat	Himself	Guest appearance	
1976	Adalat	Thakur Dharam Chand / Raju	Nominated—Filmfare Award for Best Actor	
1976	Balika Badhu	Adult Amal	Voiceover	
1977	Immaan Dharam	Ahmed Raza		
1977	Khoon Pasina	Shiva / Tiger		
1977	Alaap	Alok Prasad		
1977	Amar Akbar Anthony	Anthony Gonsalves	Filmfare Award for Best Actor; Also playback singer for the song ""My Name Is Anthony Gonsalves"	
1977	Parvarish	Inspector Amit Singh		
1977	Charandas	Qawwali singer	Guest appearance	
1977	Chala Murari Hero Banne	Himself	Guest appearance	
1977	Shatranj Ke Khilari	–	Narrator	
1978	Khatta Meetha	Himself	Guest appearance	
1978	Ganga Ki Saugandh	Jeeva		
1978	Kasme Vaade	Professor Amit / Shankar		
1978	Besharam	Ram Kumar Chandra / Prince Chandrashekar		
1978	Trishul	Vijay Kumar Gupta	Nominated—Filmfare Award for Best Actor	
1978	Don	Mark Donald "Don" / Vijay	50th Film; Filmfare Award for Best Actor	
1978	Muqaddar Ka Sikandar	Sikandar	Nominated—Filmfare Award for Best Actor	
1979	The Great Gambler	Jay / CID Inspector Vijay	Also playback singer for the song "Do Lafzon Ki"	
1979	Jurmana	Inder Saxena		
1979	Mr. Natwarlal	Natwarlal / Avtar Singh	Also playback singer for the song "Mere Paas Aao Mere Doston"; Nominated—Filmfare Award for Best Actor and Best Male Playback Singer	
1979	Kaala Patthar	Vijay Pal Singh	Nominated—Filmfare Award for Best Actor	
1979	Manzil	Ajay Chandra		
1979	Suhaag	Amit Kapoor		
1979	Gol Maal	Himself	Guest appearance	
1979	Ahsaas	Himself	Guest appearance	
1979	Cinema Cinema	Himself	Guest appearance	
1980	Do Aur Do Paanch	Vijay / Ram		
1980	Dostana	CID Inspector Vijay Verma	Nominated—Filmfare Award for Best Actor	
1980	Ram Balram	Inspector Balram Singh		
1980	Shaan	Vijay Kumar		
1981	Barsaat Ki Ek Raat	ACP Abhijeet Rai	Bilingual film; Simultaneously shot in Hindi and Bengali	
1981	Anusandhan	ACP Abhijeet Rai	Bilingual film; Simultaneously shot in Hindi and Bengali	
1981	Naseeb	John Jani Janardan (Johnny)	Also playback singer for the song "Chal Mere Bhai"	
1981	Lawaaris	Heera	Nominated—Filmfare Award for Best Actor; Also playback singer "Mere Angne Mein"	
1981	Silsila	Amit Malhotra	Nominated—Filmfare Award for Best Actor; Also playback singer for "Neela Aasman So Gaya", "Dekha Ek Khwab", "Yeh Kahan Aa Gaye Hum" and "Rang Barse Bhige Chunar Wali"	
1981	Yaarana	Kishan		
1981	Kaalia	Kallu / Kaalia		
1981	Commander	Himself	Guest appearance	
1981	Chashme Buddoor	Himself	Guest appearance	
1981	Vilayati Babu	Jagga	Punjabi film; Guest appearance	
1982	Satte Pe Satta	Ravi Anand / Babu		
1982	Bemisal	Dr. Sudhir Roy / Adhir Roy	75th film; Nominated—Filmfare Award for Best Actor	
1982	Desh Premee	Master Dinanath / Raju		
1982	Namak Halaal	Arjun Singh	Nominated—Filmfare Award for Best Actor	
1982	Khud-Daar	Govind Srivastava / Chhotu Ustaad		
1982	Shakti	Vijay Kumar	Nominated—Filmfare Award for Best Actor	
1983	Nastik	Shankar		
1983	Andha Kanoon	Jan Nissar Akhtar Khan	Filmfare Award for Best Supporting Actor	
1983	Mahaan	Rana Ranveer Singh (Amit) / Inspector Shankar Singh / Guru Singh (Note: He played triple roles.)	Also playback singer for the song "Jidhar Dekhoon Teri Tasveer"	
1983	Pukar	Ramdas / Ronnie	Also playback singer for the song "Tu Maike Mat Jaiyo"	
1983	Coolie	Iqbal Khan		
1983	Film Hi Film	Jengo / Guru	Special appearance	
1984	Inquilaab	Amarnath (Amar)		
1984	Sharaabi	Vicky Kapoor	Nominated—Filmfare Award for Best Actor; Also playback singer for the song "Jahan Chaar Yaar Mil Jaye"	
1984	Paan Khaye Saiyan Hamaar	Nahar Singh	Bhojpuri film; Special appearance	
1984	Kanoon Kya Karega	–	Narrator	
1984	Pet Pyaar Aur Paap	Himself	Guest appearance	
1985	Mard	Raju Singh / Mard Tangewala	Also playback singer for the song "Sun Rabia Tumse Pyar Ho Gaya"	
1985	Geraftaar	Inspector Karan Kumar Khanna		
1985	Ameer Aadmi Gharib Aadmi	Himself	Cameo appearance	
1985	Ghulami	–	Narrator	
1986	Aakhree Raasta	David D'Costa / Inspector Vijay Shandaliya		
1987	Jalwa	Himself	Guest appearance	
1987	Kaun Jeeta Kaun Haara	Himself	Guest appearance	
1988	Shahenshah	Inspector Vijay Kumar Srivastava / Shahenshah	Nominated—Filmfare Award for Best Actor	
1988	Gangaa Jamunaa Saraswati	Ganga Prasad		
1988	Soorma Bhopali	Police Inspector		
1988	Akarshan	Unknown	Guest appearance	
1988	Hero Hiralal	Himself	Guest appearance	
1989	Batwara	Narrator		
1989	Toofan	Shyam / Toofan	Also playback singer for the song "Don't Worry Be Happy"	
1989	Jaadugar	Goga / Gogeshwar	Also playback singer for the song "Padosan Apni Murgi"	
1989	Main Azaad Hoon	Guru / Azaad	Also playback singer for the song "Itne Baazu"	
1990	Agneepath	Vijay Deenanath Chauhan	National Film Award for Best Actor; Nominated—Filmfare Award for Best Actor	
1990	Aaj Ka Arjun	Bheema		
1990	Kroadh	Himself	Cameo appearance	
1991	Hum	Shekhar Malhotra / Tiger	Filmfare Award for Best Actor	
1991	Ajooba	Shehzada Ali / Ajooba		
1991	Indrajeet	Inspector Indrajeet	100th Film	
1991	Akayla	Inspector Vijay Verma		
1992	Khuda Gawah	Badshah Khan	Also Narrator; Nominated—Filmfare Award for Best Actor; Also playback singer for the song "Sar Zameene Hindustan"	
1992	Zulm Ki Hukumat	–	Narrator	
1993	Professor Ki Padosan	Himself	Cameo appearance; Also narrator	
1994	Insaniyat	Inspector Amar Nath Singh		
1994	Akka	Himself	Marathi film; Guest appearance	
1996	Ghatak: Lethal	Himself	Guest appearance	
1996	Tere Mere Sapne	Narrator	Also producer	
1997	Mrityudata	Dr. Ram Prasad Ghayal	Also producer	
1998	Major Saab	Major Jasbir Singh Rana	Also producer	
1998	Bade Miyan Chote Miyan	Vijay Nagam (Bade Miyan) / Inspector Arjun Singh		
1998	Hero Hindustani	Narrator		
1999	Lal Baadshah	Lal (Baadshah) Singh / Ranbhir Singh		
1999	Sooryavansham	Thakur Bhanu Pratap Singh / Heera Singh	Also playback singer for the song "Chori Se"	
1999	Hindustan Ki Kasam	Kabeera / Baba		
1999	Kohram	Col. Balbir Singh Sodi (Devraj Hathoda) / Dada Bhai		
1999	Biwi No.1	Himself	Guest appearance	
1999	Hello Brother	God	Voice-role; Cameo appearance	
2000	Mohabbatein	Principal Narayan Shankar	Filmfare Award for Best Supporting Actor	
2001	Ek Rishtaa: The Bond of Love	Vijay Kapoor		
2001	Aks	Inspector Manu Verma	Also producer; Filmfare Critics Award for Best Actor; Nominated—Filmfare Award for Best Actor	
2001	Kabhi Khushi Kabhie Gham...	Yashvardhan Raichand (Yash)	Nominated—Filmfare Award for Best Supporting Actor; Also playback singer for the song "Say Shava Shava"	
2001	Lagaan	Narrator		
2002	Aankhen	Vijay Singh Rajput	Nominated—Filmfare Award for Best Supporting Actor; Also playback singer for the song "Amitabh Soliloquy"	
2002	Hum Kisise Kum Nahin	Dr. Avinash Rastogi		
2002	Kaante	Yashvardhan (Major) Rampal	Nominated—Filmfare Award for Best Actor	
2002	Agni Varsha	Devraj	Special appearance	
2003	Armaan	Dr. Siddharth Sinha	Also playback singer for the song "Aao Milke Gaye"	
2003	Boom	Bade Mia	125th Film	
2003	Baghban	Raj Malhotra	Nominated—Filmfare Award for Best Actor; Also playback singer for the songs "Main Yahan Tu Wahan", "Chali Chali Phir", "Holi Khele Raghuveera" and "O Dharti Tarse Amber Berse"	
2003	Khushi	–	Narrator	
2003	Mumbai Se Aaya Mera Dost	–	Narrator	
2003	Fun2shh... Dudes in the 10th Century	–	Narrator	
2004	Khakee	DCP Anant Kumar Shrivastava	Nominated—Filmfare Award for Best Actor	
2004	Aetbaar	Dr. Ranveer Malhotra	Also playback singer for the song "Jeena Hai Kis Liye"	
2004	Dev	DCP Dev Pratap Singh	Also playback singer for the song "Dev Speaks"	
2004	Lakshya	Col. Sunil Damle		
2004	Deewaar	Major Ranvir Kaul		
2004	Kyun! Ho Gaya Na...	Raj Chauhan	Also playback singer for the song "Baat Samjha Karo"	
2004	Hum Kaun Hai?	Frank James Williams / Major Frank John Williams		
2004	Ab Tumhare Hawale Watan Saathiyo	Major General Amarjeet Singh		
2004	Veer-Zaara	Chaudhary Sumer Singh (Bauji)	Nominated—Filmfare Award of Best Supporting Actor	
2004	Rudraksh	–	Narrator	
2004	Insaaf: The Justice	–	Narrator	
2005	Black	Debraj Sahai	National Film Award for Best Actor; Filmfare Award for Best Actor; Filmfare Critics Award for Best Actor	
2005	Waqt: The Race Against Time	Ishwar Chandra Thakur		
2005	Bunty Aur Babli	DCP Dashrath Singh	Nominated—Filmfare Award for Best Supporting Actor	
2005	Sarkar	Subhash Nagre (Sarkar)	Nominated—Filmfare Award for Best Actor; Also playback singer for the songs "Govinda – Song" and Mujhe Jo Sahi Lagta Hai"	
2005	Viruddh	Vidhyadhar Ramkrishhna Patwardhan	Also producer	
2005	Dil Jo Bhi Kahey...	Shekhar Sinha		
2005	Ek Ajnabee	Col. Suryaveer Singh (Surya)		
2005	Paheli	Gadariya	Special appearance	
2005	Ramji Londonwaley	Himself	Special appearance	
2005	Parineeta	–	Narrator	
2005	Amrithadhare	Himself	Kannada film; Guest appearance	
2006	Family	Virendra (Viren) Sahai	Also producer	
2006	Darna Zaroori Hai	Professor Sunil Khanna	Segment : Imaginary Ghost	
2006	Kabhi Alvida Naa Kehna	Samarjit (Sam) Talwar	Nominated—Filmfare Award for Best Supporting Actor	
2006	Baabul	Balraj Kapoor	Also playback singer for the songs "Come On" and "Kehta Hai Baabul"	
2006	Ganga	Thakur Vijay Singh	Bhojpuri film	
2007	Eklavya: The Royal Guard	Eklavya		
2007	Nishabd	Vijay Anand	150th film; Also playback singer for the songs "Rozaana" and "Kabhi Nahi"	
2007	Cheeni Kum	Buddhadev Gupta	Also playback singer for the song "Baatein Hawa"	
2007	Shootout at Lokhandwala	Advocate Dhingra		
2007	Aag	Babban Singh	Also playback singer for the song "Mehbooba"	
2007	Om Shanti Om	Himself	Cameo appearance	
2007	Jhoom Barabar Jhoom	Himself	Special appearance in the song ''Jhoom Barabar Jhoom"	
2007	Swami	–	Narrator	
2007	Gangotri	Thakur Vijay 'Thakur Kaka' Singh	Bhojpuri film	
2007	Ek Krantiveer: Vasudev Balwant Phadke	–	Narrator Marathi film	
2008	The Last Lear	Harish Mishra (Harry)	English film	
2008	Yaar Meri Zindagi	Dr. Ajay Singh	Delayed release	
2008	Bhoothnath	Kailash Nath (Bhoothnath)	Also playback singer for the songs "Mere Buddy", "Samaye Ka Pahiya" and "Chalo Jaane Do"	
2008	Sarkar Raj	Subhash Nagre (Sarkar)		
2008	God Tussi Great Ho	God		
2008	Jodhaa Akbar	–	Narrator	
2009	Delhi-6	Mr. Mehra (Dadaji)	Guest appearance; Also playback singer for the song "Noor"	
2009	Aladin	Genius	Also playback singer for the songs "Genie Rap" and "O Re Sawariya"	
2009	Paa	Auro	National Film Award for Best Actor; Filmfare Award for Best Actor; Also producer; Also playback singer for the song "Mere Paa"	
2009	Zor Lagaa Ke...Haiya!	–	Narrator	
2010	Rann	Vijay Harshwardhan Malik		
2010	Teen Patti	Professor Venkat Subramanium		
2010	Kandahar	Lokanatha Sharma	Malayalam film	
2011	Bbuddah... Hoga Terra Baap	Vijay (Vijju) Malhotra	Also producer; Also playback singer for the songs "Bbuddah Hoga Terra Baap", "Go Meera Go" and "Haal-E-Dil"	
2011	Aarakshan	Dr. Prabhakar Anand	Nominated—Filmfare Award for Best Actor	
2011	Ra.One	–	Voiceover	
2012	Department	Sarjerao Gaikwad		
2012	Kahaani	–	Narrator; Also playback singer for the song "Ekla Chalo Re"	
2012	Mr. Bhatti on Chutti	Himself	Guest appearance	
2012	Bol Bachchan	Himself	Guest appearance in the song "Bol Bachchan"; Also playback singer for the song "Bol Bachchan"	
2012	English Vinglish	Himself	Guest appearance	
2012	Ganga Devi	Chitta Ji	Cameo appearance; Bhojpuri film	
2013	The Great Gatsby	Meyer Wolfsheim	American film	
2013	Satyagraha	Dwarka Anand		
2013	Bombay Talkies	Himself	Guest appearance in the segment "Murabba"	
2013	Boss	–	Narrator	
2013	Krrish 3	–	Narrator	
2013	Mahabharat	Bhishma	Voiceover	
2014	Bhoothnath Returns	Khailash Nath (Bhoothnath)	175th film	
2014	Manam	Pratap Ji	Telugu film; Special appearance	
2014	Kochadaiiyaan	–	Narrator for Hindi version	
2015	Shamitabh	Amitabh Sinha / Robert	Also producer and playback singer for the song "Piddly Si Baatein"	
2015	Piku	Bhashkor Banerjee	National Film Award for Best Actor; Filmfare Critics Award for Best Actor; Nominated—Filmfare Award for Best Actor	
2015	Hey Bro	Himself	Special appearance in the song "Birju"	
2016	Wazir	Pandit Omkarnath Dhar	Also playback singer for the song "Khel Khel Mein"	
2016	Te3n	John Biswas	Also playback singer for the song "Kyun Re - 1"	
2016	Pink	Deepak Sehgal	Nominated—Filmfare Award for Best Actor; Also playback singer for the song "Tu Chal"	
2016	Ki & Ka	Himself	Guest appearance	
2016	Wah Taj	–	Narrator	
2016	Veergatha	Dharma Chakra	Voiceover	
2017	The Ghazi Attack	–	Narrator	
2017	Begum Jaan	–	Narrator	
2017	Firangi	–	Narrator	
2017	Sarkar 3	Subhash Nagre (Sarkar)	Also playback singer for the song "Ganpati Aarti"	
2017	The Great Leader	Leader	Bhojpuri film	
2018	Pad Man	–	Narrator	
2018	Helicopter Eela	Himself	Guest appearance	
2018	102 Not Out	Dattatraya Jagjeevan Vakharia	Also playback singer for the songs "Badumbaaa" and "Waqt Ne Kiya Kya Haseen Sitam"	
2018	Thugs of Hindostan	Khudabaksh Jhaazi Azaad	Also playback singer for the song "Lori"	
2019	Manikarnika: The Queen of Jhansi	–	Narrator	
2019	Badla	Advocate Badal Gupta / Nirmal Singh Toor (Nimbi)	200th film; Also playback singer for the song "Aukaat"	
2019	Sye Raa Narasimha Reddy	Guru Gosayi Venkanna	Telugu film; Special appearance	
2020	AB Aani CD	Himself	Marathi film; Guest appearance	
2020	Ghoomketu	Himself	Guest appearance	
2020	Gulabo Sitabo	Chunnan (Mirza) Nawab	Filmfare Critics Award For Best Actor; Nominated–Filmfare Award for Best Actor	
2021	Chehre	Advocate Lateef Zaidi	Also playback singer for the song "Chehre - Title Track"	
2022	Jhund	Vijay Borade		
2022	Runway 34	Narayan Vedant		
2022	Radhe Shyam	–	Narrator for the Hindi version	
2022	Brahmāstra: Part One – Shiva	Raghu (Guruji)		
2022	Fakt Mahilao Maate	Kanji Parikh	Gujarati film; Special appearance	
2022	Chup: Revenge of the Artist	Himself	Special appearance	
2022	Goodbye	Harish Bhalla		
2022	Naam Tha Kanhaiyalal	Himself	Documentary	
2022	Uunchai	Amit Srivastava	Nominated–Filmfare Award for Best Actor	
2023	Ghoomer	Himself	Special appearance	
2023	Ganapath	Maharishi Dalapathi		
2024	Kalki 2898 AD	Ashwatthama	Telugu film	
2024	Fakt Purusho Maate	Prabhudas	Gujarati film; Special appearance	
2024	Vettaiyan	Dr. Sathyadev Bramhadutt Pande	Tamil film	
2024	The Real Superstar	Himself	Documentary	
2025	120 Bahadur	–	Voiceover	
TBA	Kalki 2898 AD : Part 2 †	Ashwatthama	Telugu film	

=== Production credits ===
Year	Film	Notes	Ref.
1995	Gulabi	Telugu film	
1996	Tere Mere Sapne		
1996	Yuvathurki	Malayalam film	
1997	Mrityudata		
1997	Ullaasam	Tamil film	
1998	Saat Rang Ke Sapne		
1998	Major Saab		
2001	Aks	Filmfare Critics Award for Best Actor	
2005	Viruddh... Family Comes First		
2005	Antarmahal	Bengali film	
2006	Family		
2009	Paa	National Film Award for Best Actor; Filmfare Award for Best Actor	
2010	Vihir	Marathi film	
2011	Bbuddah... Hoga Terra Baap	Also playback singer for the song "Bbuddah Hoga Terra Baap"	
2013	Saptapadii	Gujarati film	
2015	Shamitabh	Also playback singer for the song "Piddly Si Baatein"	

== Television ==
Year	Title	Role	Note	Ref.
1993–1994	Dekh Bhai Dekh	—	Producer	
2000–2006, 2010–present	Kaun Banega Crorepati	Host	Season 1–2, Season 4–present	
2009	Bigg Boss 3	Host	Season 3	
2011	The One Show	Himself	Special appearance	
2013	Bharat Ka Veer Putra – Maharana Pratap	Himself	Voice over	
2014	Taarak Mehta Ka Ooltah Chashmah	Himself	Special appearance	
2014	Yudh	Yudhisthir Sikarwar	Television miniseries; lead role	
2015	Desi Rascals	Himself	Special appearance	
2015–2016	Aaj Ki Raat Hai Zindagi	Host		
2016–2017	Astra Force	Astra	Animated series; voice role Also co-creator with Sharad Devarajan	

== Documentaries ==
Year	Title	Language	Role	Director(s)	Notes	Ref.
2005	March of the Penguins	English, Hindi	Narrator	Luc Jacquet		
2011	The Story of Film: An Odyssey	English	Himself	Mark Cousins	Special appearance	
2011	Bollywood: The Greatest Love Story Ever Told	English, Hindi	Himself	Rakeysh Omprakash Mehra; Jeff Zimbalist		
2015	Putting the Fun in Fundamental	English	Himself	Andy Lee	Special appearance in the episode "Bollywood Goddess"	
2022	The Journey of India	Hindi	Himself			
2023	The Romantics	English, Hindi	Himself	Smriti Mundhra		
2025	Angry Young Men	English, Hindi	Himself	Namrata Rao		

== Music videos ==
Year	Title	Performer(s)	Album	Ref.
1988	"Mile Sur Mera Tumhara"	Various	—	
1996	Various	Bally Sagoo	"Aby Baby"	
2002	"Kabhi Nahi"	Adnan Sami	"Tera Chehra"	
2010	"Phir Mile Sur Mera Tumhara"	Various	—	
2017	"Phir Se"	Amruta Fadnavis	—	
2021	"Hum Hindustani"	Various	—	
2022	"Har Ghar Tiranga"	Asha Bhosle, Sonu Nigam, Devi Sri Prasad	—	

== See also ==
- Awards and nominations received by Amitabh Bachchan
