= Angry young man (India) =

Indian film movement

Angry Young Man (India)
- Location: India
- Major figures: Salim Khan; Javed Akhtar (Salim–Javed); Amitabh Bachchan (Hindi cinema); Rajinikanth (Tamil cinema); Rajasekhar (Telugu cinema); Vishnuvardhan (Kannada cinema)

The Angry Young Man refers to a series of film movements in Indian cinema that originated with the 1970s Hindi films of Salim–Javed. The style eventually spread to Tamil cinema, Telugu cinema, and Kannada cinema. The phrase also refers to an antihero personified by the actors Amitabh Bachchan (Hindi cinema), Rajinikanth (Tamil cinema), Rajasekhar (Telugu cinema), and Vishnuvardhan (Kannada cinema).

== Hindi cinema ==
=== Origin ===
The term "Angry Young Man" was first used to describe both a new style of Hindi cinema, as well as a new hero archetype, in response to the 1973 Salim-Javed film Zanjeer starring Amitabh Bachchan. The film was a striking contrast to the romantic films of the 1960s, as it instead focused on the social upheavals of the early 1970s. However, the use of the phrase "Angry Young Man" in relation to their films did not originate with either Salim Khan or Javed Akhtar. In fact, neither had intended to deliberately create films that served as social commentary. In an interview, when asked how his films "reflect[ed] the 1970s," Akhtar said that he couldn't "say that when we were writing Zanjeer and Deewaar, we were aware of all these points. It would be dishonest to say that. We were part of what was happening at that time…If you considered the political mood of the country, you’d find a lot of frustration. Social Protest had begun….There was disillusionment with all the institutions, colleges, the police force. People were disillusioned with the government. So it wasn’t surprising that the morality of the day said that if you want justice, you had to fight for it yourself. And if you didn’t fight, you’ll be crushed and finished off.”

In the guide for the BAFTA event, "Screen Icons: Amitabh Bachchan" (June 16–17, 2007), Professor Rachel Dwyer notes that the term "Angry Young Man" as applied to both Bachchan and the new style of Hindi film, was "inspired by Realist London theatre of the 1950s, in particular Osborne's Look Back in Anger." Chaudhuri Diptakirti concurs, noting that the protagonist of Look Back in Anger (about the difficulties faced by working and middle class youth in England during the 1950s) was referred to as "the Angry Young Man."

In that era, Amitabh Bachchan’s movies were coming one after another, and we used to wear clothes just like him: the shirt with the big collar and size 36 bottoms...At the time of the JP movement and Emergency, cinema had a big impact on society. The younger generation, including us, used to relate with the ‘angry young man’ that was created by Salim-Javed, and both of them changed the entire pattern for the Indian film industry. People were suffering through the Emergency and then were going to watch a Bachchan film the very next day. The writing had a lot to do with what was going on; there was a visible change in the younger generation, and people grew up with that newly developed mindset.

— Actor Akhilendra Mishra

=== Impact and films ===
The "Angry Young Man" Hindi films of the 1970s reflected both the general difficulties of the period and (in the case of Deewaar and Sholay, by coincidence) The Emergency (1975-1977). Anupama Chopra notes that "on the streets a new morality was taking shape. Amitabh Bachchan gave face to that ethos. He played a grim urban vigilante. Three seminal films all written by the pioneering script-writing team of Javed Akhtar and Salim Khan shaped his persona: Zanjeer (Shackles)...Sholay (Embers)...and Deewaar (The Wall)." Raheja and Kothari also argue that "the decade's median year, 1975 spliced the 70s into two neat sections. While in the early 70s, a Zanjeer and a Bobby could draw both audiences in the same year, after Deewaar and Sholay ('75), the remaining half of the 70s were straddled by a single entity - the angry young man - Amitabh Bachchan...audiences responded to Amitabh's insolent championing of the common man's cause as he conveyed essential decency lurking underneath the tough carapace." French director Francois Truffaut referred to Bachchan's dominance during this period as a “one man industry.”

Additional "Angry Young Man" films with Bachchan (almost always as "Vijay") include: Khoon Pasina (1977), Trishul (1978), Don (1978), Muqaddar Ka Sikandar (1978), Kaala Patthar (1979), Dostana (1980), Shaan (1980), Kaalia (1981), Laawaris (1981), Shakti (1982), Coolie (1983), Shahenshah (1988), and Agneepath (1990).

=== Documentary ===
In 2024, Amazon Prime Video released a three-part documentary series about the Salim–Javed screenwriting duo titled Angry Young Men. The series explores their creative partnership, their influence on the evolution of Indian cinema, and their personal journeys beyond the partnership.

== Regional cinema ==
Rajinikanth would ultimately be known as the "angry young man" of Tamil cinema. He credited Hindi film star Amitabh Bachchan as his inspiration, and began playing Amitabh Bachchan's roles in Tamil remakes of his films. The most successful of these were remakes of Salim–Javed films, such as Billa (1980), Thee (1981) and Mr. Bharath (1986).

Vishnuvardhan and Rajasekhar are known as the angry young men of Kannada cinema and Telugu cinema, respectively.
