= Amitabh Bachchan =

Indian actor (born 1942)

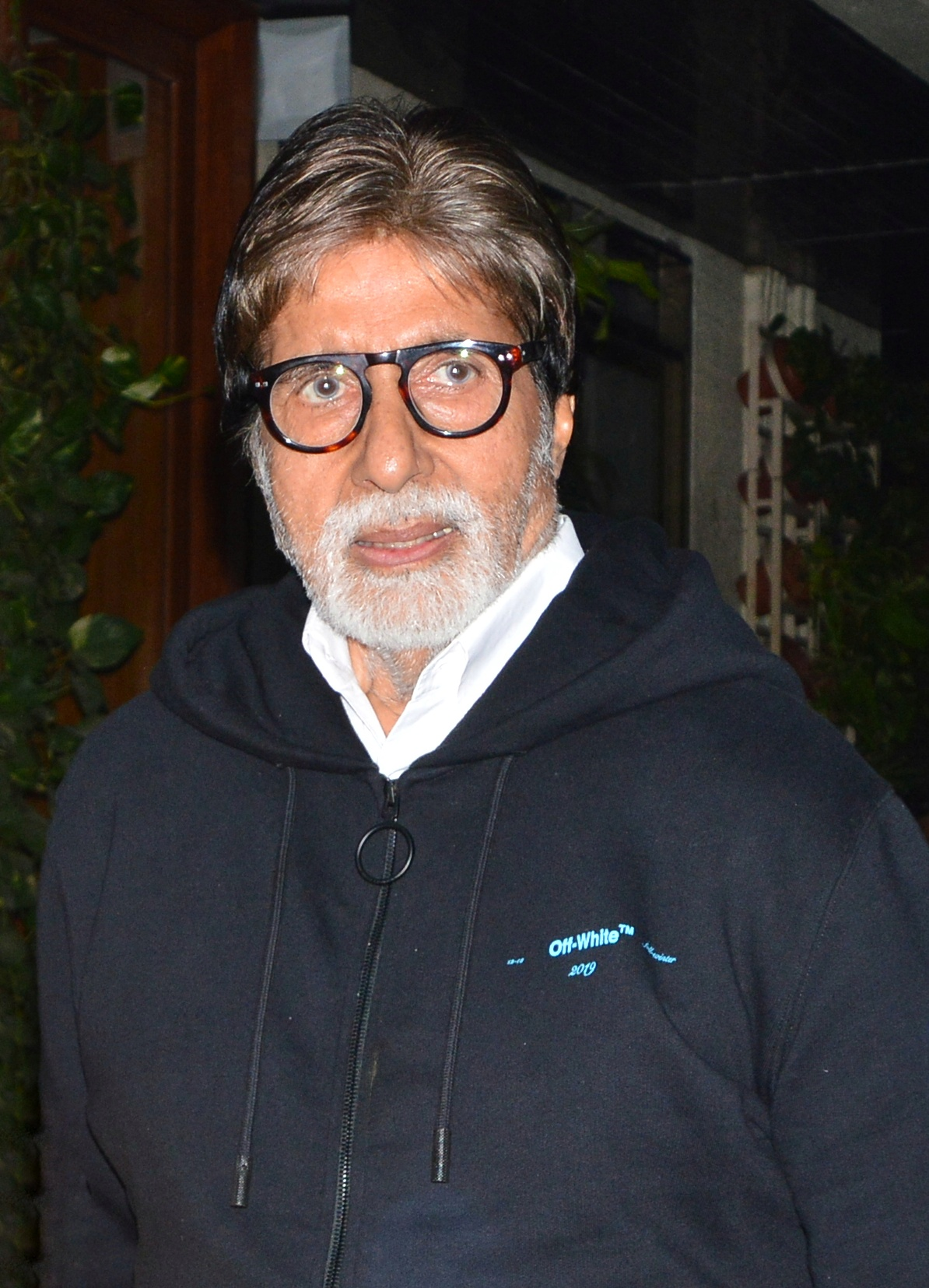
- Bachchan in 2018
- Born: Amitabh Srivastava; 11 October 1942 (age 84); Allahabad, United Provinces, British India (present-day Prayagraj, Uttar Pradesh, India)
- Other names: Angry Young Man; Shahenshah; Big B
- Education: Kirori Mal College, University of Delhi (B.Sc)
- Occupations: Actor; film producer; television presenter
- Years active: 1969–present
- Works: Filmography
- Spouse: Jaya Bhaduri (m. 1973)
- Children: Shweta and Abhishek
- Parents: Harivansh Rai Bachchan (father); Teji Bachchan (mother)
- Relatives: Aishwarya Rai (daughter-in-law); Nikhil Nanda (son-in-law)
- Family: Bachchan family
- Awards: Full list
- Honours: Padma Shri (1984); Padma Bhushan (2001); Legion of Honour (2007); Padma Vibhushan (2015); Dadasaheb Phalke Award (2018)

Member of Parliament, Lok Sabha
- In office 31 December 1984 – 29 July 1987
- Preceded by: Janeshwar Mishra
- Succeeded by: V. P. Singh
- Constituency: Allahabad, Uttar Pradesh
- Party: Indian National Congress (1984–1987)
- Website: Official blog

Amitabh Bachchan (Note: pronounced [əmɪˈt̪ɑːbʱ ˈbətːʃən]) (né Srivastava; born 11 October 1942) is an Indian actor, playback singer, and producer who primarily works in Hindi cinema. Widely considered one of the greatest, most accomplished and commercially successful actors in the history of Indian cinema, he has starred in over 200 films. Bachchan has been called "the Angry Young Man", the Shahenshah of Bollywood, Sadi ke Mahanayak (literally meaning "superstar of the century"), Bollywood's Star of the Millennium, or simply Big B. His dominance in the Indian film industry during the 1970s–80s led the French director François Truffaut to describe him as a "one-man industry". He is a recipient of several accolades including seven National Film Awards and seventeen Filmfare Awards & one South Filmfare award.

Bachchan was born in Allahabad (now Prayagraj), and he was educated at Sherwood College, Nainital, Uttarakhand and Kirori Mal College, University of Delhi. His film career started in 1969 as a voice narrator in Mrinal Sen's film Bhuvan Shome and first gained popularity in the early-1970s, with films, such as Anand, Zanjeer, Namak Haraam and Roti Kapda Aur Makaan. He achieved greater stardom in later years, being dubbed as "Angry Young Man" for several of his on-screen roles in Hindi films. He consistently starred in a number of top-grossing Hindi films from the mid-1970s to the 1980s, such as Deewaar, Sholay, Kabhi Kabhie, Hera Pheri, Amar Akbar Anthony, Parvarish, Trishul, Don, Muqaddar Ka Sikandar, Kasme Vaade, Suhaag, Kaala Patthar, Dostana, Naseeb, Lawaaris, Namak Halaal, Khud-Daar, Coolie, Andhaa Kanoon, Sharaabi and Mard. Some of his most acclaimed performances, include Majboor, Chupke Chupke, Mili, Do Anjaane, Alaap, The Great Gambler, Shaan, Barsaat Ki Ek Raat, Silsila, Kaalia, Satte Pe Satta, Bemisal, Shakti, Aakhree Raasta and Shahenshah. Bachchan was voted the "greatest star of stage or screen" in the BBC Your Millennium online users poll in 1999. In October 2003, Time magazine said he is the undisputed godfather of Bollywood.

After taking a break from acting in the 1990s, Bachchan's resurgence was marked in 2000 with Mohabbatein. Since then he starred in several successful and acclaimed films like Kabhi Khushi Kabhie Gham, Aankhen, Baghban, Veer-Zaara, Khakee, Black, Sarkar, Kabhi Alvida Naa Kehna, Cheeni Kum, Paa, Piku, Pink, Badla, Brahmāstra: Part One – Shiva and Kalki 2898 AD. He also made an appearance in the Hollywood film, The Great Gatsby (2013), in which he played a non-Indian Jewish character.

Bachchan has won numerous accolades in his career, including record four National Film Awards in Best Actor category and many awards at international film festivals and award ceremonies. He has won sixteen Filmfare Awards and is the most nominated performer in any major acting category at Filmfare with 34 nominations in Best Actor and 42 nominations overall. The Government of India honoured him with the Padma Shri in 1984, the Padma Bhushan in 2001, the Padma Vibhushan in 2015, and India's highest award in the field of cinema, the Dadasaheb Phalke Award in 2018 for his contributions to the arts. The Government of France honoured him with its highest civilian honour, Officer of the Legion of Honour, in 2007 for his exceptional career in the world of cinema and beyond.

In addition to acting, Bachchan has worked as a playback singer, film producer, and television presenter. He has hosted several seasons of the game show Kaun Banega Crorepati, which is the Indian version of the game show franchise, Who Wants to Be a Millionaire?. He also entered politics for a time in the 1980s. Bachchan has also been involved in several humanitarian works and he is a brand endorser in India. Beyond the Indian subcontinent, he acquired a large overseas following of the South Asian diaspora, as well as others, in markets including Africa (South Africa, Eastern Africa, and Mauritius), the Middle East (especially Egypt and the UAE), the United Kingdom, Russia, Central Asia, the Caribbean (Guyana, Suriname, and Trinidad and Tobago), Oceania (Fiji, Australia, and New Zealand), Canada and the United States.

== Early life and family ==
Bachchan was born on 11 October 1942 in Allahabad (now Prayagraj) to Hindi poet Harivansh Rai Bachchan and social activist Teji Bachchan. Harivansh Rai Bachchan was an Awadhi Hindu Kayastha, who was fluent in Awadhi, Hindi and Urdu. Harivansh's ancestors came from a village called Babupatti, in the Raniganj tehsil, in the Pratapgarh district, in the present-day state of Uttar Pradesh, in India. Teji Bachchan was a Punjabi Sikh Khatri from Lyallpur, Punjab, British India (present-day Faisalabad, Punjab, Pakistan). Bachchan has a younger brother, Ajitabh, who is five years younger than him.

Bachchan's parents were initially going to name him Inquilaab (Hindustani for "Revolution"), inspired by the phrase Inquilab Zindabad ("Long live the revolution") popularly used during the Indian independence struggle; the name Amitabh was suggested to his father by poet Sumitranandan Pant. Although his surname was Srivastava, Amitabh's father, who opposed the caste system, had adopted the pen name Bachchan ("child-like" in colloquial Hindi), under which he published all of his works. When his father was looking to get him admitted to a school, he and Bachchan's mother decided the family's name should be Bachchan instead of Shrivastava. It is with this last name that Amitabh debuted in films and used for all other practical purposes, Bachchan has become the surname for all of his immediate family. Bachchan's father died in 2003, and his mother in 2007.

Bachchan's secondary education was at Boys' High School & College in Allahabad and Sherwood College in Nainital. He attended Kirori Mal College at the University of Delhi in Delhi. He graduated with a Bachelor of Science degree from Kirori Mal College in 1962. When Bachchan finished his studies, his father approached Prithviraj Kapoor, the founder of Prithvi Theatre and patriarch of the Kapoor acting family, to see if there was an opening for him, but Kapoor offered no encouragement. Bachchan was a friend of Rajiv Gandhi and Sanjay Gandhi, before he became an actor. He used to spend time with them when he was a resident in New Delhi. Bachchan's family were very close to the Nehru-Gandhi family of politicians. When Sonia Gandhi first came to India from Italy before her marriage, Bachchan had received her at the Palam International Airport on 13 January 1968. She spent 48 days at Bachchan's house with his parents before her wedding to Rajiv.

In the late 1960s, Bachchan applied to be a newsreader for All India Radio in Delhi, but "failed the audition". He became a business executive for Bird & Company in Kolkata (Calcutta), and worked in theatre before starting his film career. It is thought that his mother might have had some influence on his choice of career, for she always insisted that he should "take centre stage".

== Acting career ==
=== Early career (1969–1972) ===
Bachchan made his film debut in 1969, as a voice narrator in Mrinal Sen's National Award–winning film Bhuvan Shome. His first acting role was as one of the seven protagonists in the film Saat Hindustani, directed by Khwaja Ahmad Abbas and featuring Utpal Dutt, Anwar Ali (brother of comedian Mehmood), Madhu and Jalal Agha. Anand (1971) followed, in which Bachchan starred alongside Rajesh Khanna. His role as a doctor with a cynical view of life garnered Bachchan his first Filmfare Award for Best Supporting Actor. He then played his first antagonist role as an infatuated lover-turned-murderer in Parwana (1971). Following Parwana, he starred in several films, including Sunil Dutt's Reshma Aur Shera (1971) where he played a mute character. During this time, he made a guest appearance in the film Guddi which starred his future wife Jaya Bhaduri. He narrated part of the film Bawarchi. In 1972, he made an appearance in the road action comedy Bombay to Goa directed by S. Ramanathan which was moderately successful. Many of Bachchan's films during this early period did not do well. His only film with Mala Sinha, Sanjog (1972) was also a box office failure.

=== Rise to prominence (1973–1974) ===
Bachchan was struggling, seen as a "failed newcomer" who, by the age of 30, had only two successes (as a lead in Bombay to Goa and a supporting role in Anand). Bachchan was then discovered by screenwriter duo Salim–Javed, consisting of Salim Khan and Javed Akhtar. Salim Khan wrote the story, screenplay and script of Zanjeer (1973), and conceived the "angry young man" persona of the lead role. Javed Akhtar came on board as co-writer, and Prakash Mehra, who saw the script as potentially groundbreaking, as the film's director. However, they were struggling to find an actor for the lead "angry young man" role; it was turned down by several actors, owing to it going against the "romantic hero" image dominant in the industry at the time. Salim-Javed "saw his talent, which most makers didn't. He was exceptional, a genius actor who was in films that weren't good." According to Salim Khan, they "strongly felt that Amitabh was the ideal casting for Zanjeer". Salim Khan introduced Bachchan to Prakash Mehra, and Salim-Javed insisted that Bachchan be cast for the role.

Zanjeer was a crime film with violent action, in sharp contrast to the romantically themed films that had generally preceded it, and it established Amitabh in a new persona—the "angry young man" of Bollywood. He earned his first Filmfare Award nomination for Best Actor, with Filmfare later considering this one of the most iconic performances in Bollywood history. The film was a blockbuster and one of the highest-grossing films of that year, breaking Bachchan's dry spell at the box office and making him a star. It was the first of many collaborations between Salim-Javed and Amitabh; the duo wrote many of their subsequent scripts with Bachchan in mind for the lead role, and insisted on him being cast for their later films. Salim Khan also introduced Bachchan to director Manmohan Desai with whom he formed a long and successful association, alongside Prakash Mehra and Yash Chopra.

Eventually, Bachchan became one of the most successful leading men of the film industry. His portrayal of the wronged hero fighting a crooked system and circumstances of deprivation in films like Zanjeer, Deewaar, Trishul, Kaala Patthar and Shakti resonated with the masses of the time, especially the youth who harboured a simmering discontent owing to social ills such as poverty, hunger, unemployment, corruption, social inequality and the brutal excesses of The Emergency. This led to Bachchan being dubbed as the "angry young man", a journalistic catchphrase that became a metaphor for the dormant rage, frustration, restlessness, sense of rebellion and anti-establishment disposition of an entire generation, prevalent in the 1970s.

The year 1973 was also when he married Jaya, and around this time they appeared in several films together: not only Zanjeer but also subsequent films such as Abhimaan, which was released around the same time after their wedding and was also successful at the box office. Later, he played the role of Vikram, once again along with Rajesh Khanna, in the film Namak Haraam, a social drama directed by Hrishikesh Mukherjee and addressing themes of friendship. The film proved to be a superhit and Bachchan won his second Filmfare Award for Best Supporting Actor for his performance. The flow of successes continued for Bachchan in 1974. He began the year with a guest appearance in Dulal Guha's blockbuster social drama film Dost. After this, he starred in Aravind Sen's drama film Kasauti and Narendra Bedi's crime thriller Benaam, both of which ended up as moderate commercial successes. Bachchan's next release was Manoj Kumar's fourth directional venture Roti Kapada Aur Makaan. The film opened to excellent response all over the country, eventually taking top spot at the box office that year and emerging an All Time Blockbuster as well as Bachchan's biggest hit up to that point of time. Before the end of year, he delivered a hit in Ravi Tandon's crime thriller Majboor. Written by Salim-Javed, it also had Pran and Parveen Babi in the lead.

=== Peak years (1975–1988) ===
In 1975, Bachchan starred in a variety of film genres, from the comedy Chupke Chupke and the crime drama Faraar to the romantic drama Mili. This was also the year in which he starred in two films regarded as important in Hindi cinema history, both written by Salim-Javed, who again insisted on casting Bachchan. The first was Deewaar, directed by Yash Chopra, where he worked with Shashi Kapoor, Nirupa Roy, Parveen Babi, and Neetu Singh. The film emerged a blockbuster at the box office and earned him another Filmfare nomination for Best Actor. Indiatimes ranks Deewaar among the Top 25 Must See Bollywood Films. The other, released on 15 August 1975, was Sholay, which became the highest-grossing film ever in India at the time, in which Bachchan played the role of Jaidev. Deewaar and Sholay are often credited with exalting Bachchan to the heights of superstardom, two years after he became a star with Zanjeer, and consolidating his domination of the industry throughout the 1970s and 1980s. In 1999, BBC India declared Sholay the "Film of the Millennium" and, like Deewaar, it has been cited by Indiatimes Movies as among the Top 25 Must See Bollywood Films. In that same year, the judges of the 50th annual Filmfare Awards awarded it with the special distinction award called the Filmfare Best Film of 50 Years.

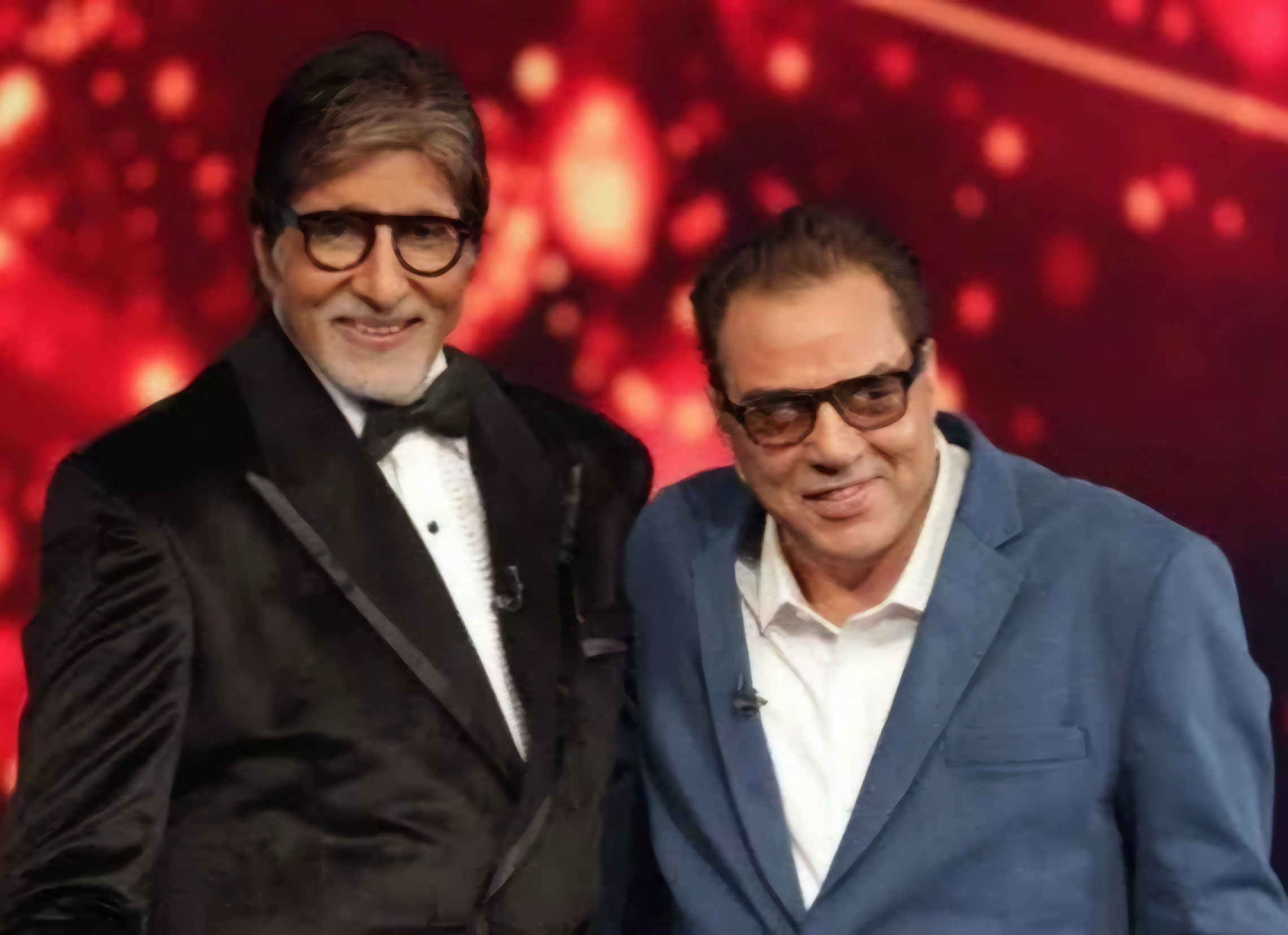
Bachchan and Dharmendra starrer Sholay (1975) recorded an estimated ₹15-18 crore footfalls, making it the highest grossing Indian film in terms of audience attendance to date.

In 1976, he was cast by Yash Chopra in the romantic musical Kabhi Kabhie. Bachchan starred as a young poet, Amit Malhotra, who falls deeply in love with a beautiful young girl named Pooja (Rakhee Gulzar) who ends up marrying someone else (Shashi Kapoor). The film was notable for portraying Bachchan as a romantic hero, a far cry from his "angry young man" roles like Zanjeer and Deewaar. Despite its heavy theme, Kabhi Kabhie went on to become a superhit. Its soundtrack composed by Khayyam and lyrics written by Sahir Ludhianvi dominated the year-end annual list of Binaca Geetmala and was one of the best-selling Hindi film albums of the 1970s. Bachchan was again nominated for the Filmfare Best Actor Award for his role in the film. That same year, he played a double role in another hit Adalat as father and son. In 1977, he won his first Filmfare Best Actor Award for his performance in Amar Akbar Anthony, in which he played the third lead opposite Vinod Khanna and Rishi Kapoor as Anthony Gonsalves. The film was the highest-grossing film of that year. His other major hits that year include Parvarish and Khoon Pasina.

He once again resumed double roles in films such as Kasme Vaade (1978) as Amit and Shankar and Don (1978) playing the characters of Don, a leader of an underworld gang and his look-alike Vijay. His performance won him his second Filmfare Best Actor Award. He also gave towering performances in Yash Chopra's Trishul and Prakash Mehra's Muqaddar Ka Sikandar both of which earned him further Filmfare Best Actor nominations. 1978 is arguably considered his most successful year at the box office since all of his six releases in the same year, namely Muqaddar Ka Sikandar, Trishul, Don, Kasme Vaade, Ganga Ki Saugandh and Besharam were box office successes, with the former three being the consecutive highest-grossing films of the year, a rare feat in Hindi cinema.

In 1979, Bachchan starred in Suhaag which was the highest-earning film of that year. In the same year, he also enjoyed critical acclaim and commercial success with films like Jurmana, Mr. Natwarlal and Kaala Patthar. He was required to use his singing voice for the first time in a song from the film Mr. Natwarlal in which he starred with Rekha. Bachchan's performance in the film saw him nominated for both the Filmfare Award for Best Actor and the Filmfare Award for Best Male Playback Singer. He also received a Best Actor nomination for Kaala Patthar and then went on to be nominated again in 1980 for the Raj Khosla directed superhit film Dostana, in which he starred opposite Shatrughan Sinha and Zeenat Aman. His other releases of 1980, Do Aur Do Paanch and Shaan underperformed with the latter ending its run with average numbers owing to huge costs, but Vijay Anand's Ram Balram alongside Dharmendra was a box office hit. This changed in 1981 with back-to-back huge blockbusters in Naseeb and Laawaris, both of which were among the top 5 highest-grossing films of 1981. Bachchan also had two hits, Yaarana and Kaalia, and received praise for his performance in Yash Chopra's romantic drama Silsila, which attracted considerable attention from the media when it was in production due to its casting. Although the film did not do well commercially, it gained cult status in later years and is considered one of Chopra's best works ever. The same year, he made his debut in Bengali cinema with Shakti Samanta's action thriller Anusandhan. Simultaneously shot in Hindi as Barsaat Ki Ek Raat, the film was a blockbuster in West Bengal, running for over 23 weeks.

In 1982, he played double roles in the musical Satte Pe Satta and action drama Desh Premee which succeeded at the box office along with highly successful ventures like action comedy Namak Halaal, action drama Khud-Daar and the critically acclaimed films Shakti and Bemisal.

On 26 July 1982, while filming a fight scene with co-actor Puneet Issar for Coolie, Bachchan had a near-fatal intestinal injury. Bachchan was performing his stunts in the film and one scene required him to fall onto a table and then on the ground. However, as he jumped towards the table, the corner of the table struck his abdomen, resulting in a splenic rupture from which he lost a significant amount of blood. He required an emergency splenectomy and remained critically ill in the hospital for many months, at times close to death. There were long queues of well-wishing fans outside the hospital where he was recuperating; the public response included prayers in places of worship and offers to sacrifice limbs to save him. Nevertheless, he resumed filming later that year after a long period of recuperation. The director, Manmohan Desai, altered the ending of Coolie: Bachchan's character was originally intended to have been killed off; but, after the change of script, the character lived in the end. Desai felt it would have been inappropriate for the man who had just fended off death in real life to be killed on screen. The footage of the fight scene is frozen at the critical moment, and a caption appears onscreen marking it as the instant of the actor's injury. The film was released in 1983, and partly due to the huge publicity of Bachchan's accident, it emerged an All Time Blockbuster and top-grossing film of the year. He then played a triple role in S. Ramanathan's action drama Mahaan, which proved to be a flop. Other releases that year, Nastik and Pukar were average fares, but Andhaa Kaanoon (in which he had a small role) was a blockbuster. During a stint in politics from 1984 to 1987, five of his completed films were released, out of which four emerged major successes, these were - Manmohan Desai's action film Mard (1985), which proved to be a massive blockbuster, followed by superhits, Sharaabi (1984) and Geraftaar (1985) and a hit film Aakhree Raasta (1986). After his stint in politics ended, Bachchan returned to films in 1988, playing the title role in Tinnu Anand's vigilante action film Shahenshah, which opened to historic response all over the nation and emerged a huge hit as well as the second highest-grossing film of the year.

=== Health issues ===
In 1984, he was later diagnosed with Myasthenia gravis. The illness weakened him both mentally and physically. At this time he became pessimistic, expressing concern with how a new film would be received, and stating before every release, "Yeh film to flop hogi!" ("This film will flop").

=== Career fluctuations, sabbatical, business ventures (1989–1999) ===
After the success of his comeback film however, Bachchan's star power began to wane as his subsequent releases like Gangaa Jamunaa Saraswati (1988), Jaadugar, Toofan and Main Azaad Hoon (all released in 1989) did not do well commercially. He did gain success during this period with superhits in K.C. Bokadia's crime drama film Aaj Ka Arjun (1990) and Mukul Anand's masala film Hum (1991), but this momentum was short-lived and his string of box office failures continued with Ajooba, Indrajeet and Akayla. Notably, despite a decline in number of hits, it was during this era that Bachchan won his first National Film Award for Best Actor for his performance as a Mafia don in the cult film Agneepath (1990). After the release of Mukul Anand's moderately successful, but critically acclaimed 1992 epic film Khuda Gawah, Bachchan announced his semi retirement from the film industry. With the exception of the delayed release Insaniyat (1994), Bachchan did not act for five years. He set up the Amitabh Bachchan Corporation, Ltd. (ABCL) in 1996. ABCL's strategy was to introduce products and services covering an entire cross-section of India's entertainment industry. ABCL's operations were mainstream commercial film production and distribution, audio cassettes and video discs, production and marketing of television software, and celebrity and event management. Soon after the company was launched in 1996, the first film it produced was Tere Mere Sapne, which was a box office hit and launched the careers of actors like Arshad Warsi and southern film star Simran.

In 1997, Bachchan attempted to make his acting comeback with the film Mrityudata, produced by ABCL. Though Mrityudaata attempted to reprise Bachchan's earlier success as an action hero, the film was a failure both financially and critically. ABCL was the main sponsor of the 1996 Miss World Beauty Pageant, which was held in Bangalore, but lost millions. The fiasco and the consequent legal battles surrounding ABCL and various entities after the event, coupled with the fact that ABCL was reported to have overpaid most of its top-level managers, eventually led to its financial and operational collapse in 1997. The company went into administration and was later declared a failed company by the Indian Industries board. The Bombay High Court, in April 1999, restrained Bachchan from selling off his Bombay bungalow 'Prateeksha' and two flats until the pending loan recovery cases of Canara Bank were disposed of. Bachchan had, however, pleaded that he had mortgaged his bungalow to raise funds for his company. He appeared in Bade Miyan Chote Miyan (1998) and Major Saab (1998), and received positive reviews for Sooryavansham (1999). However, films such as Lal Baadshah (1999) and Kohram (1999) were box office failures.

=== Return to success (2000–present) ===
In 2000, when he was deeply in debt after a period of financial failure, Bachchan went to visit Yash Chopra (whom he had previously worked with on a number of films including Deewaar, Trishul, and Kaala Patthar) and said, "Look, I don't have a job, nobody is giving me work anymore, my movies aren't working, and I've come to ask you to please give me a film to work in." Chopra immediately offered him a role in Aditya Chopra's Mohabbatein, a role which would reboot Bachchan's career, and lead to his third Filmfare Award for Best Supporting Actor. It also marked his first appearance with Shahrukh Khan. Bachchan then went on to work in a number of films including Ek Rishtaa: The Bond of Love (2001), Kabhi Khushi Kabhie Gham (2001) and Baghban (2003). As an actor, he continued to perform in a range of characters, receiving critical praise for his performances in Aks (2001), Aankhen (2002), Kaante (2002), Khakee (2004), Dev (2004) and Veer-Zaara (2004). His performance in Aks won him his first Filmfare Critics Award for Best Actor.

One project that did particularly well for Bachchan was Sanjay Leela Bhansali's Black (2005). The film starred Bachchan as an ageing teacher of a deaf-blind girl and followed their relationship. His performance was unanimously praised by critics and audiences and won him his second National Film Award for Best Actor, his fourth Filmfare Best Actor Award, and his second Filmfare Critics Award for Best Actor. Taking advantage of this resurgence, Amitabh began endorsing a variety of products and services, appearing in many television and billboard advertisements. In 2005 and 2006, he starred with his son Abhishek in the films Bunty Aur Babli (2005), the Godfather adaptation Sarkar (2005), and Kabhi Alvida Naa Kehna (2006). All of them were successful at the box office. His later releases in 2006 and early 2007 were Baabul (2006), Ekalavya (2007) and Nishabd (2007), which failed to do well at the box office but his performances in each of them were praised by critics.

In May 2007, two of his films, the romantic comedy Cheeni Kum and the multi-starrer action drama Shootout at Lokhandwala, were released. Shootout at Lokhandwala did well at the box office and was declared a hit in India, while Cheeni Kum picked up after a slow start and was declared a semi-hit by the end of its theatrical run. A remake of his biggest hit, Sholay (1975), entitled Ram Gopal Varma Ki Aag, released in August of that same year and proved to be a major commercial failure in addition to its poor critical reception. The year also marked Bachchan's first appearance in an English-language film, Rituparno Ghosh's The Last Lear, co-starring Arjun Rampal and Preity Zinta. The film premiered at the 2007 Toronto International Film Festival on 9 September 2007. He received positive reviews from critics who hailed his performance as his best since Black. Bachchan was slated to play a supporting role in his first international film, Shantaram, directed by Mira Nair and starring Hollywood actor Johnny Depp in the lead. The film was due to begin filming in February 2008 but due to the writer's strike, was pushed to September 2008. The film is currently "shelved" indefinitely.

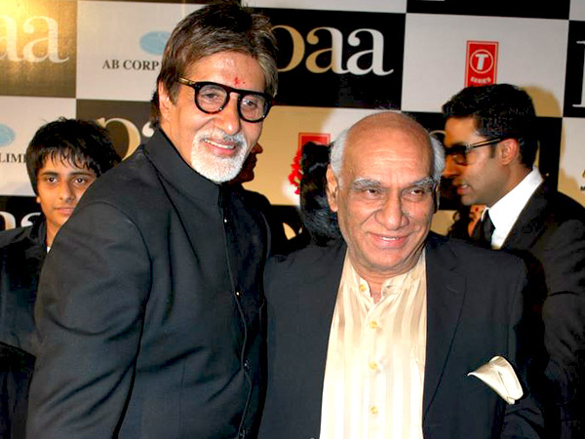
Amitabh Bachchan and Yash Chopra in the premiere of Paa. Bachchan received his third National Film Award for Best Actor at the 57th National Film Awards for his performance and his fifth Filmfare Award for Best Actor for Paa.

Vivek Sharma's Bhoothnath, in which he plays the title role as a ghost, was released on 9 May 2008. Sarkar Raj, the sequel of the 2005 film Sarkar, released in June 2008 and received a positive response at the box office. Paa, which was released at the end of 2009 was a highly anticipated project as it saw him playing his own son Abhishek's Progeria-affected 13-year-old son, and it opened to favourable reviews, particularly towards Bachchan's performance and was one of the top-grossing films of 2009. It won him his third National Film Award for Best Actor and fifth Filmfare Best Actor Award. In 2010, he debuted in Malayalam film through Kandahar, directed by Major Ravi and co-starring Mohanlal. The film was based on the hijacking incident of the Indian Airlines Flight 814. Bachchan declined any remuneration for this film. In 2011 he played an aged retired former gangster in Bbuddah... Hoga Terra Baap who protects his son Sonu Sood who is an honest daring police officer from a notorious gangster Prakash Raj who unknowingly hired the latter to perform a contract killing not knowing that the police officer is the gangster's son. Despite significant expectations, it had poor returns at the box office.

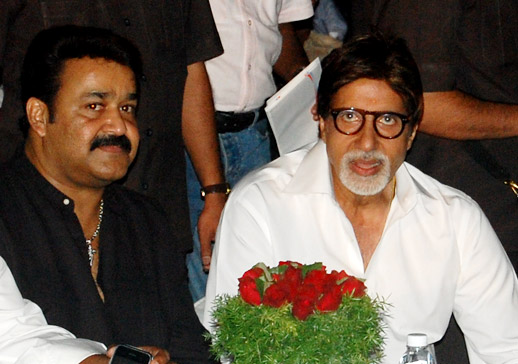
Bachchan with Mohanlal

In 2013, he made his Hollywood debut in The Great Gatsby making a special appearance opposite Leonardo DiCaprio and Tobey Maguire. In 2014, he played the role of the friendly ghost in the sequel Bhoothnath Returns. The next year, he played the role of a grumpy father experiencing chronic constipation in the critically acclaimed Piku which was also one of the biggest hits of 2015. A review in Daily News and Analysis (DNA) summarised Bachchan's performance as "The heart and soul of Piku clearly belong to Amitabh Bachchan who is in his elements. His performance in Piku, without doubt, finds a place among the top 10 in his illustrious career." Rachel Saltz wrote for The New York Times, "Piku", an offbeat Hindi comedy, would have you contemplate the intestines and mortality of one Bhashkor Banerji and the actor who plays him, Amitabh Bachchan. Bhashkor's life and conversation may revolve around his constipation and fussy hypochondria, but there's no mistaking the scene-stealing energy that Mr. Bachchan, India's erstwhile Angry Young Man, musters for his new role of Cranky Old Man." Well known Indian critic Rajeev Masand wrote on his website, "Bachchan is pretty terrific as Bhashkor, who reminds you of that oddball uncle that you nevertheless have a soft spot for. He bickers with the maids, harrows his hapless helper, and expects Piku to stay unmarried so she can attend to him. At one point, to ward off a possible suitor, he casually mentions that his daughter isn't a virgin; that she's financially independent and sexually independent too. Bachchan embraces the character's many idiosyncrasies, never once slipping into caricature while all along delivering big laughs thanks to his spot-on comic timing." The Guardian summed up, "Bachchan seizes upon his cranky character part, making Bashkor as garrulously funny in his theories on caste and marriage as his system is backed-up." The performance won Bachchan his fourth National Film Award for Best Actor and his third Filmfare Critics Award for Best Actor.

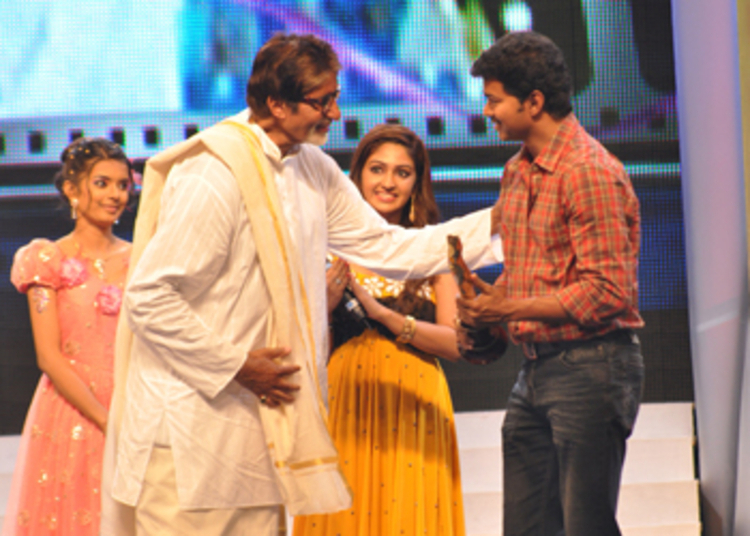
Bachchan with Vijay

In 2016, he appeared in the women-centric courtroom drama film Pink which was highly praised by critics and with an increasingly good word of mouth, was a resounding success at the domestic and overseas box office. Bachchan's performance in the film received acclaim. According to Raja Sen of Rediff.com, "Amitabh Bachchan, a retired lawyer with bipolar disorder, takes up cudgels on behalf of the girls, delivering courtroom blows with pugilistic grace. As we know from Prakash Mehra movies, in each life some Bachchan must fall. The girls hang on to him with incredulous desperation, and he bats for them with all he has. At one point Meenal hangs by Bachchan's elbow, words entirely unnecessary. Bachchan towers through Pink – the way he bellows "et cetera" is alone worth having the heavy-hitter at play—but there are softer moments like one where he appears to have dozed off in court, or where he lays his head by his convalescent wife's bedside and needs his hair ruffled and his conviction validated." Writing for Hindustan Times, noted film critic and author Anupama Chopra said of Bachchan's performance, "A special salute to Amitabh Bachchan, who imbues his character with a tragic majesty. Bachchan towers in every sense, but without a hint of showboating. Meena Iyer of The Times of India wrote, "The performances are pitch-perfect with Bachchan leading the way. Writing for NDTV, Troy Ribeiro of Indo-Asian News Service (IANS) stated, "Amitabh Bachchan as Deepak Sehgall, the aged defence lawyer, shines as always, in a restrained, but powerful performance. His histrionics come primarily in the form of his well-modulated baritone, conveying his emotions and of course, from the well-written lines." Mike McCahill of The Guardian remarked, "Among an electric ensemble, Taapsee Pannu, Kirti Kulhari and Andrea Tariang give unwavering voice to the girls' struggles; Amitabh Bachchan brings his moral authority to bear as their sole legal ally.

In 2017, he appeared in the third instalment of the Sarkar film series: Ram Gopal Varma's Sarkar 3. That year, he started filming for the swashbuckling action-adventure film Thugs of Hindostan with Aamir Khan, Katrina Kaif and Fatima Sana Shaikh which released in November 2018. He co-starred with Rishi Kapoor in 102 Not Out, a comedy drama film directed by Umesh Shukla based on a Gujarati play of the same name written by Saumya Joshi. This film released in May 2018 and reunited him with Kapoor onscreen after a gap of 27 years.

In 2019, Bachchan appeared in Sujoy Ghosh's mystery thriller Badla. The film did a lifetime business of ₹1.38 billion (equivalent to ₹1.9 billion or US$20 million in 2026) worldwide to emerge a box office hit. The following year, he co-starred alongside Ayushmann Khurana in Shoojit Sircar's comedy drama Gulabo Sitabo, which won him Filmfare Award for Best Actor (Critics). He then collaborated with Emraan Hashmi for Chehre (2021), a critical and commercial failure.

The next year, Bachchan had five releases, out of which Ayan Mukerji's highly anticipated fantasy action-adventure film Brahmāstra: Part One – Shiva proved to be a hit as well as the highest-grossing Hindi film of 2022 while Jhund, Runway 34 and Uunchai did not do well at the box office, but met with critical acclaim. In 2024, he played Ashwatthama in Nag Ashwin's Kalki 2898 AD, marking his Telugu debut. Made on a budget of ₹600 crore, it opened to positive reception with Bachchan receiving immense praise for his performance. At the box office, it grossed more than ₹1,000 crore to emerge a superhit as well as the second highest-grossing Indian film of 2024.

== Other works ==
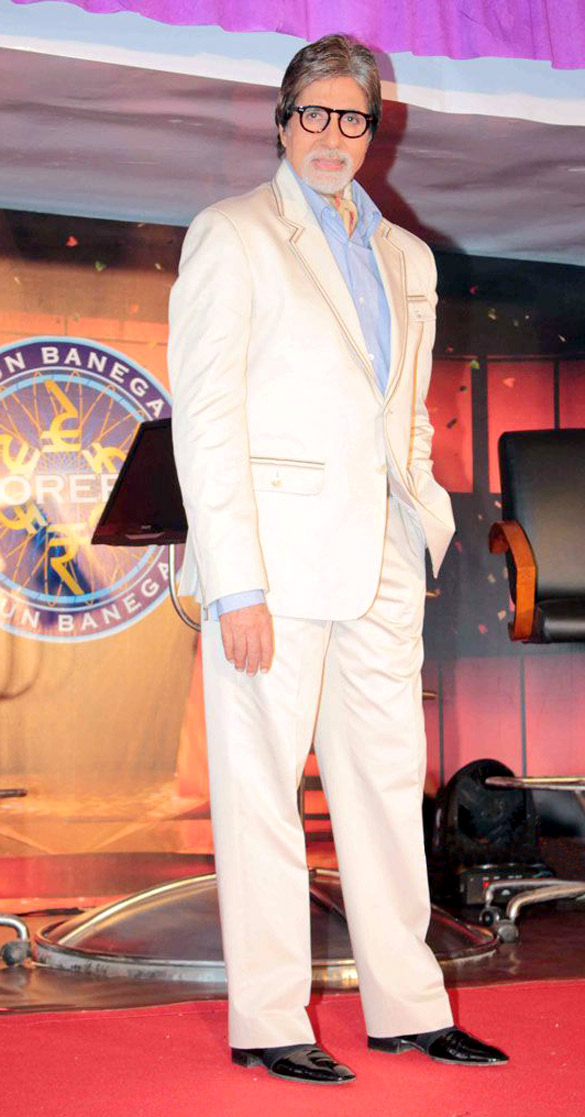
Bachchan at KBC-5 Press Meet

=== Television appearances ===
In 2000, Bachchan hosted the first season of Kaun Banega Crorepati (KBC), the Indian adaptation of the British television game show, Who Wants to Be a Millionaire?. The show was well received. A second season followed in 2005 but its run was cut short by Star Plus when Bachchan fell ill in 2006. He then returned to host the fourth season, and has hosted the show since.

In 2009, Bachchan hosted the third season of the reality show Bigg Boss.

In 2010, Bachchan hosted the fourth season of KBC. The fifth season started on 15 August 2011 and ended on 17 November 2011. The show became a massive hit with audiences and broke many TRP Records. CNN IBN awarded Indian of the Year- Entertainment to Team KBC and Bachchan. The show also grabbed all the major Awards for its category.

The sixth season was also hosted by Bachchan, commencing on 7 September 2012, broadcast on Sony TV and received the highest number of viewers thus far.

In 2014, he debuted in the fictional Sony Entertainment Television TV series titled Yudh playing the lead role of a businessman battling in both his personal and professional lives.

=== Voice acting ===
Bachchan is known for his deep, baritone voice. He has been a narrator, a playback singer, and a presenter for numerous programmes. Some prominent films featuring his narration are Satyajit Ray's 1977 film Shatranj Ke Khiladi and Ashutosh Gowarikar's 2001 film Lagaan.

He also has done voice-over work for the following movies:

- Bhuvan Shome (1969)
- Bawarchi (1972)
- Balika Badhu (1975)
- Tere Mere Sapne (1996)
- Hello Brother (1999)
- Lagaan (2001)
- Fun2shh... Dudes in the 10th Century (2003)
- Parineeta (2005)
- March of the Penguins (2005), Indian version
- Swami (2007)
- Jodhaa Akbar (2008)
- Zor Lagaa Ke...Haiya! (2009)
- Ra.One (2011)
- Kahaani (2012)
- Krrish 3 (2013)
- Mahabharat (2013)
- Kochadaiiyaan (Hindi Version) (2014)
- CBI documentary (2014) – sanctioned by Central Bureau of Investigation
- The Ghazi Attack (2017)
- Firangi (2017)

=== Business investments ===
Around 1994, Bachchan started Amitabh Bachchan Corporation Ltd (ABCL), an event management, production and distribution company. But the company fell into debt with a fiasco and went into bankruptcy, subsequently Bachchan became nearly bankrupt. The reasons for this debacle were films that fared poorly at the box office such as Mrityudata, Major Saab (produced by this organisation), and Miss World 1996 which was organised-managed by ABCL. Due to this he began work for TV, and asked for work to Yash Chopra. Retrospectively, he has said that 'it was the darkest time for him'.

He has invested in many upcoming business ventures. In 2013, he bought a 10% stake in Just Dial from which he made a gain of 4600 per cent. He holds a 3.4% equity in Stampede Capital, a financial technology firm specialising in cloud computing for financial markets. The Bachchan family also bought shares worth $252,000 in Meridian Tech, a consulting company in the US. Recently they made their first overseas investment in Ziddu.com, a cloud-based content distribution platform. Bachchan was named in the Panama Papers and Paradise Papers, leaked confidential documents relating to offshore investment.

== Political career ==
After the Emergency ended in 1977, many film magazines stopped covering Amitabh Bachchan because they believed he had helped censor the press by being too close to the government. Editors left out his name and photo from articles, sometimes replacing them with just a comma. In response, Bachchan refused interviews and kept the press away from his film sets for about fifteen years, and photographers often stopped taking his picture. This began to change in the late 1980s, after his serious accident on the set of Coolie and his brief spell in politics, when magazines started writing about him again.

In 1984, Bachchan took a break from acting and briefly entered politics in support of a long-time family friend, Rajiv Gandhi. He contested the Allahabad's (presently Prayagraj Lok Sabha constituency) seat for the 8th Lok Sabha against H. N. Bahuguna, former Chief Minister of Uttar Pradesh. With 68.2% of the votes in his favour, he won by one of the highest victory margins ever in Indian elections. In 1987, Indian Express said his brother Ajitabh Bachchan owned an apartment in Switzerland, giving rise to speculations about his involvement in the "Bofors scandal", revealed in the year before. Bachchan resigned from his seat in July 1987. Ajitabh Bachchan sued Swedish newspaper Dagens Nyheter for linking him to Bofors payments in 1990 and won damages in the United Kingdom. Sten Lindstrom, the Swedish police chief who had investigated the case, said in 2012 that "Indian investigators planted the Bachchan angle on" Dagens Nyheter.

Bachchan's old friend, Amar Singh, helped him during the financial crisis caused by the failure of his company, ABCL. Thereafter Bachchan started supporting the Samajwadi Party, the political party to which Amar Singh belonged. Jaya Bachchan joined the Samajwadi Party and is representing the party as an MP in the Rajya Sabha since 2004. Bachchan appeared in advertisements and political campaigns for the party. His claim that he too was a farmer in the advertisements was questioned in court.

=== Controversy ===
Kader Khan, who wrote and acted alongside Bachchan in many hits, later said their friendship broke down because he refused to call him “Sir ji”. He always called him “Amit,” and when a South Indian producer told him to use the formal title, he did not adhere to it. As a result, he was left out of movies like Khuda Gawah (1992) and Ganga Jamuna Saraswati (1988), and they stopped working together.

Bachchan has been accused of using the slogan "blood for blood" in the context of the 1984 anti-Sikh riots. Bachchan has denied the allegation. In October 2014, Bachchan was summoned by a court in Los Angeles for "allegedly instigating violence against the Sikh community". Bachchan in an interview with journalist Arnab Goswami offered to fight the case in court and asked the accusers to file the same as also present proof. He was also one of the trustees of the Rajiv Gandhi Foundation.

== Humanitarian and social causes ==
Bachchan has been involved with many social causes. For example, he donated ₹1.1 million to clear the debts of nearly 40 beleaguered farmers in Andhra Pradesh and ₹3 million to clear the debts of some 100 Vidarbha farmers. In 2010, he donated ₹1.1 million to Resul Pookutty's foundation for a medical centre at Kochi, and he has given ₹250,000 ($4,678) to the family of Delhi policeman Subhash Chand Tomar who died after succumbing to injuries during a protest against gang-rape after the 2012 Delhi gang rape case. He founded the Harivansh Rai Bachchan Memorial Trust, named after his father, in 2013. This trust, in association with Urja Foundation, will be powering 3,000 homes in India with electricity through solar energy. In June 2019 he cleared debts of 2100 farmers from Bihar.

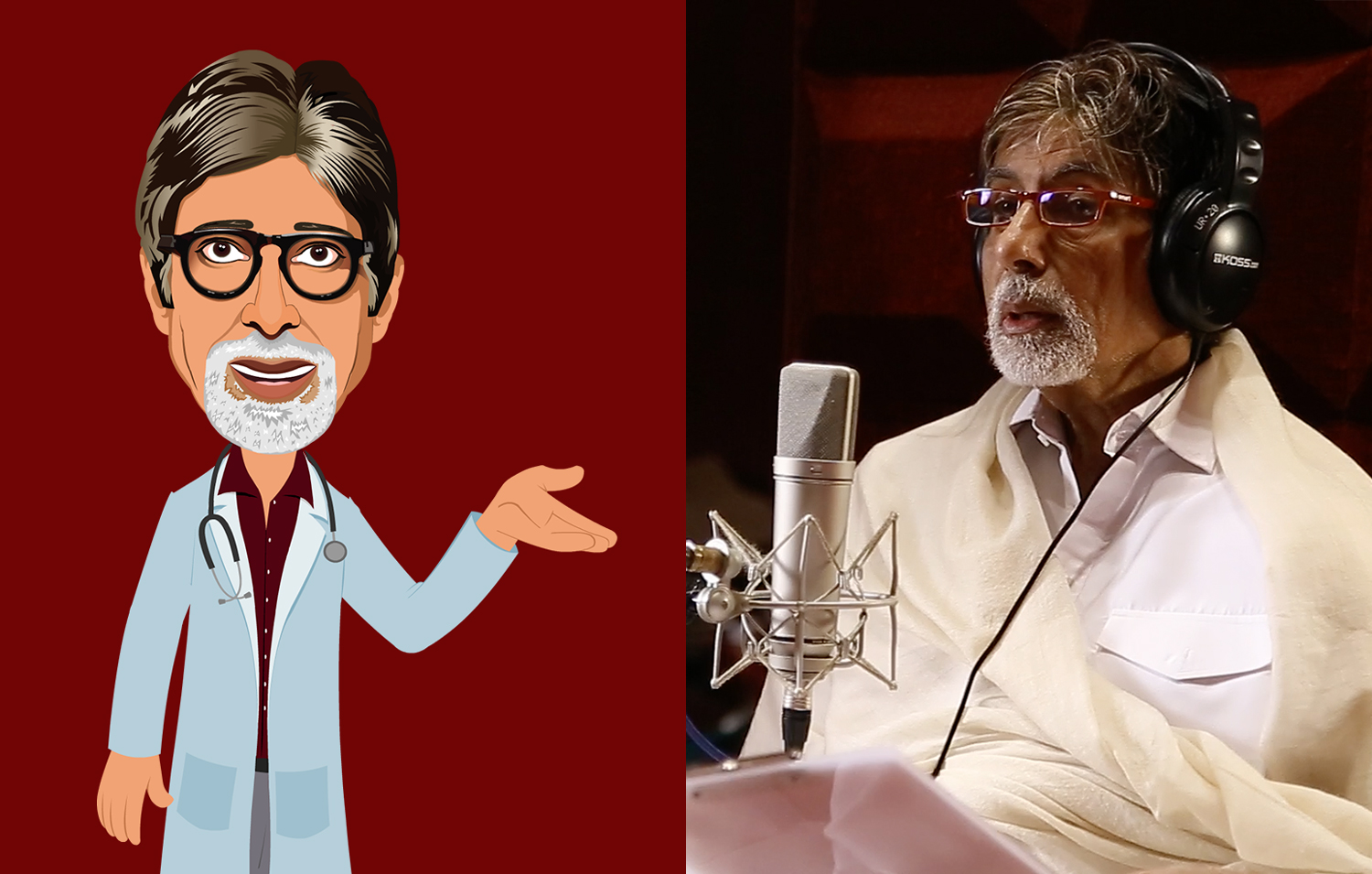
TeachAids character of Bachchan (left); Bachchan in a 2013 TeachAids recording session (right)

Bachchan was made a UNICEF Goodwill Ambassador for the polio eradication campaign in India in 2002 and an international ambassador in 2005 and a WHO Goodwill Ambassador for awareness of hepatitis in 2017. In 2013, he and his family donated ₹2.5 million ($42,664) to a charitable trust, Plan India, that works for the betterment of young girls in India. He also donated ₹1.1 million ($18,772) to the Maharashtra Police Welfare Fund in 2013.

Bachchan was the face of the 'Save Our Tigers' campaign that promoted the importance of tiger conservation in India. He supported the campaign by PETA in India to free Sunder, a 14-year-old elephant who was chained and tortured in a temple in Kolhapur, Maharashtra.

In 2014, it was announced that he had recorded his voice and lent his image to the Hindi- and English-language versions of the TeachAids software, an international HIV/AIDS prevention education tool developed at Stanford University. He has been a vocal "brand ambassador" of the Swachh Bharat Mission (SBM) and featured in a few advertisements to promote the campaign.

In 2020, Bachchan was helping the Government of India promote its public health message concerning COVID-19 before he and some members of his family became infected. He was hospitalised with reported mild symptoms of the disease on 11 July. He was discharged from hospital on 2 August. During the pandemic he lent his support by donating oxygen concentrators and 250 million rupees in various forms.

== Personal life ==
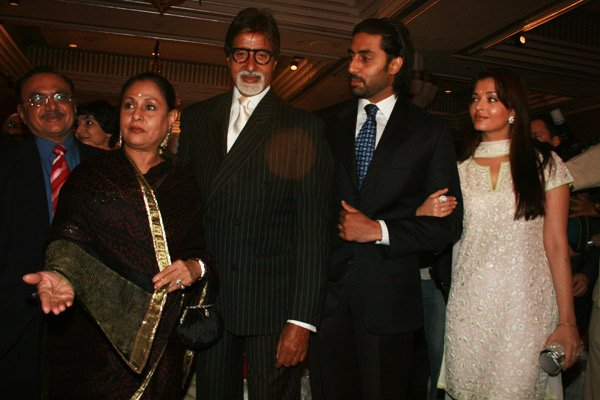
From left to right – Jaya Bachchan, Amitabh, Abhishek Bachchan, and Aishwarya Rai Bachchan

Bachchan has been married to veteran actress and politician Jaya Bhaduri since 3 June 1973, and together they have two children; Shweta, an author, journalist and former model and Abhishek, an actor and producer. Abhishek married actress Aishwarya Rai, and they have a daughter named Aaradhya.

Shweta is married to businessman Nikhil Nanda, a grandson of Raj Kapoor from the Kapoor family of actors. They have a daughter, Navya Naveli, and a son, Agastya.

Amitabh's family lives in Mumbai in Maharashtra. His younger brother Ajitabh Bachchan is a businessman. He did business and lived in London for a brief period before returning to live in India. He and his family choose to stay away from the limelight. His wife Ramola is a fashion designer and was active in business. Ajitabh has one son, Bhim, and three daughters Naina, Namrata, and Nilima. Naina is married to actor Kunal Kapoor and they have a son.

Born to a Hindu father and a Sikh mother, Bachchan has stated that he does not adhere to any particular religion.

In 2006, Bachchan stated that he is a teetotaler and a non-smoker. During a 2022 KBC episode, in response to a contestant's question about his diet, he confirmed that he is a vegetarian.

In November 2023, Bachchan gifted his bungalow Prateeksha, located in Juhu, to his daughter Shweta.

== Legacy ==
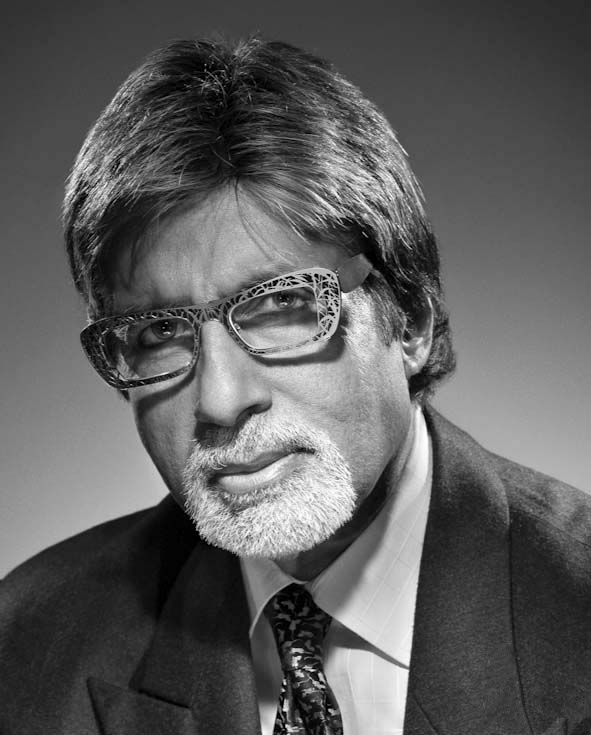
Bachchan in 2009

Bachchan is widely regarded as one of the greatest and most influential actors in the history of Indian cinema. He earned respect among critics for his memorable performances and charismatic screen presence, and is considered one of the most respected public figures of India. He is referred to as the "Shahenshah of Bollywood", "Star of the Millennium" or "Big B". Bachchan has inspired generations in Indian cinema actors, including Rajinikanth, Chiranjeevi, Shah Rukh Khan, Akshay Kumar, Pawan Kalyan, Prabhas, Manoj Bajpayee, Ajay Devgn, Mohanlal, Ranveer Singh, Allu Arjun and Yash. French director François Truffaut described Indian film industry as "one-man industry" because of his dominance.

One of the most successful actors of the 1970s and 1980s, Bachchan appeared in Box Office India's "Top Actors" list seventeen times from 1975 to 1991. He topped the list sixteen times (1976–1991).

In 1999, Bachchan was voted the "greatest star of stage or screen" in a BBC Your Millennium online poll. The organisation noted that "Many people in the western world will not have heard of [him] ... [but it] is a reflection of the huge popularity of Indian films." In October 2003, Time magazine dubbed Bachchan as "the Undisputed Godfather of Bollywood". In April 2005, The Walter Reade Theater of Lincoln Center in New York honoured Bachchan with a special tribute, retrospective—titled "Amitabh Bachchan: The Biggest Film Star in the World".

In the early 80s, Bachchan authorised the use of his likeness for the comic book character Supremo in a series titled The Adventures of Amitabh Bachchan. In May 2014, La Trobe University in Australia named a Scholarship after Bachchan. In June 2000, he became the first living Asian to have been modelled in wax at London's Madame Tussauds Wax Museum. Another statue was installed in New York in 2009, Hong Kong in 2011, Bangkok in 2011, Washington, DC in 2012 and Delhi in 2017.

In March 2010, Bachchan was named on CNN's list of the "top 25 Asian actors of all time". He was named "Hottest Vegetarian male" by PETA India in 2012. He also won the title of "Asia's Sexiest Vegetarian male" in a contest poll run by PETA Asia in 2008.

In Prayagraj, the Amitabh Bachchan Sports Complex and Amitabh Bachchan Road are named after him. A government senior secondary school in Saifai, Etawah is called Amitabh Bachchan Government Inter College. There is a waterfall in Sikkim known as Amitabh Bachchan Falls.

In January 2018, Bachchan attended the "Shalom Bollywood" reception in Mumbai during the state visit of Israeli prime minister Benjamin Netanyahu to India. Netanyahu noted that Bachchan had 30 million more Twitter followers than he did, referring to him as a "big" star and saying that "Israel loves Bollywood".

In 2022, on the occasion of Bachchan's 80th birthday, a not-for-profit organisation Film Heritage Foundation announced a film festival as a part of his 11 films collection had been screened in 17 cities across the country shown in limited cinemas.

=== Biographies ===
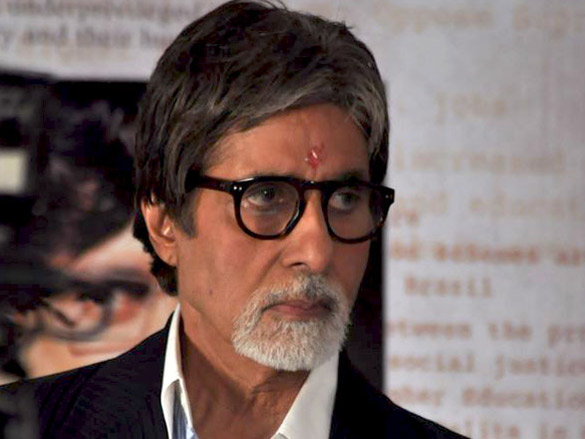
Bachchan in 2011

Several books have been written about Bachchan. The following is the listing of books focused on his life career:

- Amitabh Bachchan: the Legend was published in 1999,
- To be or not to be: Amitabh Bachchan in 2004,
- AB: The Legend (A Photographer's Tribute) in 2006,
- Amitabh Bachchan: Ek Jeevit Kimvadanti in 2006,
- Amitabh: The Making of a Superstar in 2006,
- Looking for the Big B: Bollywood, Bachchan and Me in 2007 and
- Bachchanalia in 2009.

== Awards and honours ==
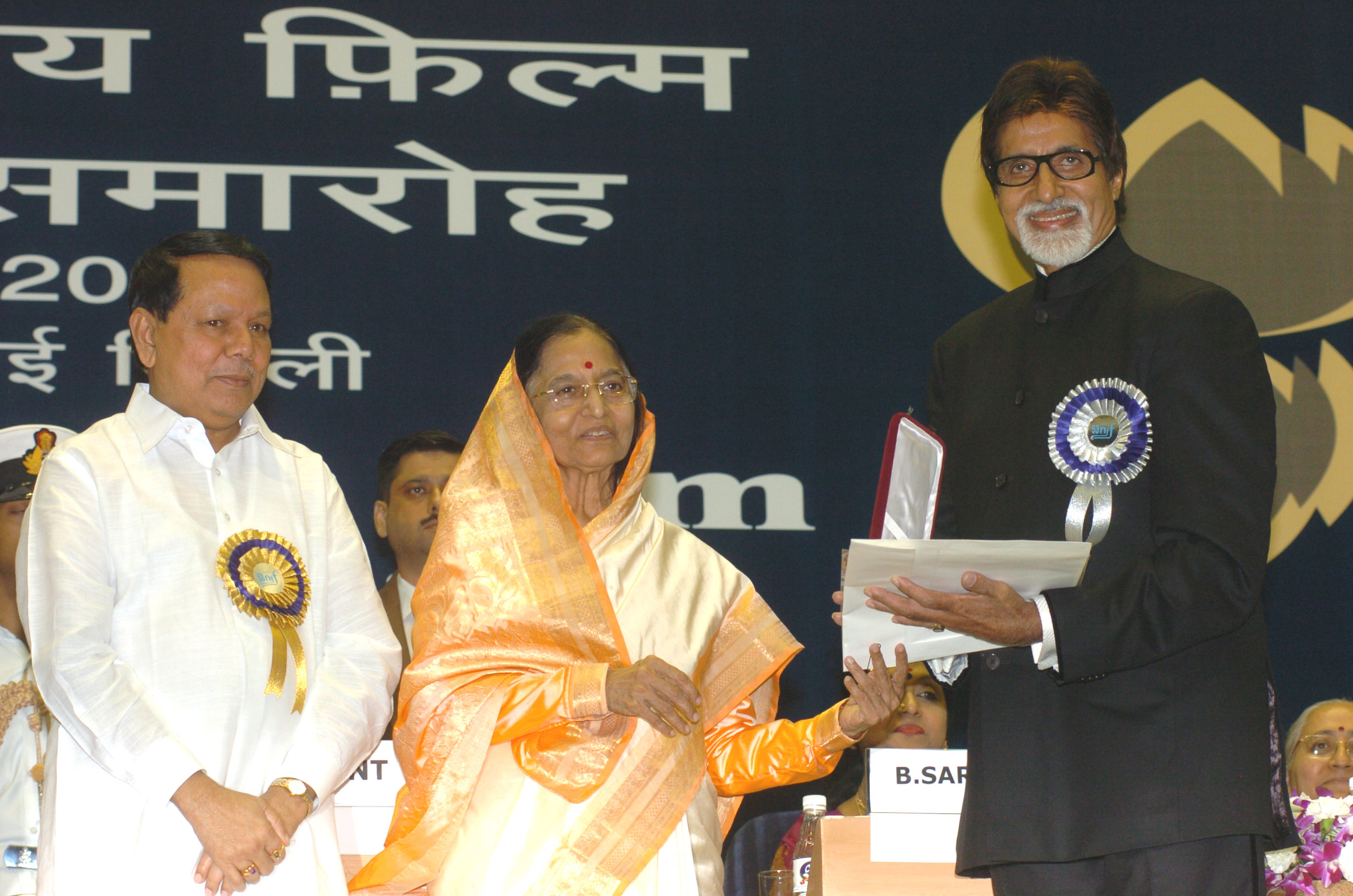
The President, Smt. Pratibha Devisingh Patil presenting the Best Film Actor Award for the year 2005 to Shri Amitabh Bachchan

Apart from industry awards won for his performances throughout the years, Bachchan has received several honours for his achievements in the Indian film industry. In 1991, he became the first artist to receive the Filmfare Lifetime Achievement Award, which was established in the name of Raj Kapoor. Bachchan was crowned as Superstar of the Millennium in 2000 at the Filmfare Awards.

In 2001, he was honoured with the Actor of the Century award at the Alexandria International Film Festival in Egypt in recognition of his contribution to the world of cinema. Many other honours for his achievements were conferred upon him at several International Film Festivals, including the Lifetime Achievement Award at the 2010 Asian Film Awards.

In 2003, he was conferred with the Honorary Citizenship of the French town of Deauville. The Government of India awarded him with the Padma Shri in 1984, the Padma Bhushan in 2001, the Padma Vibhushan in 2015 and Dadasaheb Phalke Award in 2019. The then-President of Afghanistan awarded him the Order of Afghanistan in 1991 following the shooting of Khuda Gawah there. The Government of Madhya Pradesh honoured him with Rashtriya Kishore Kumar Samman for 2002–2003.

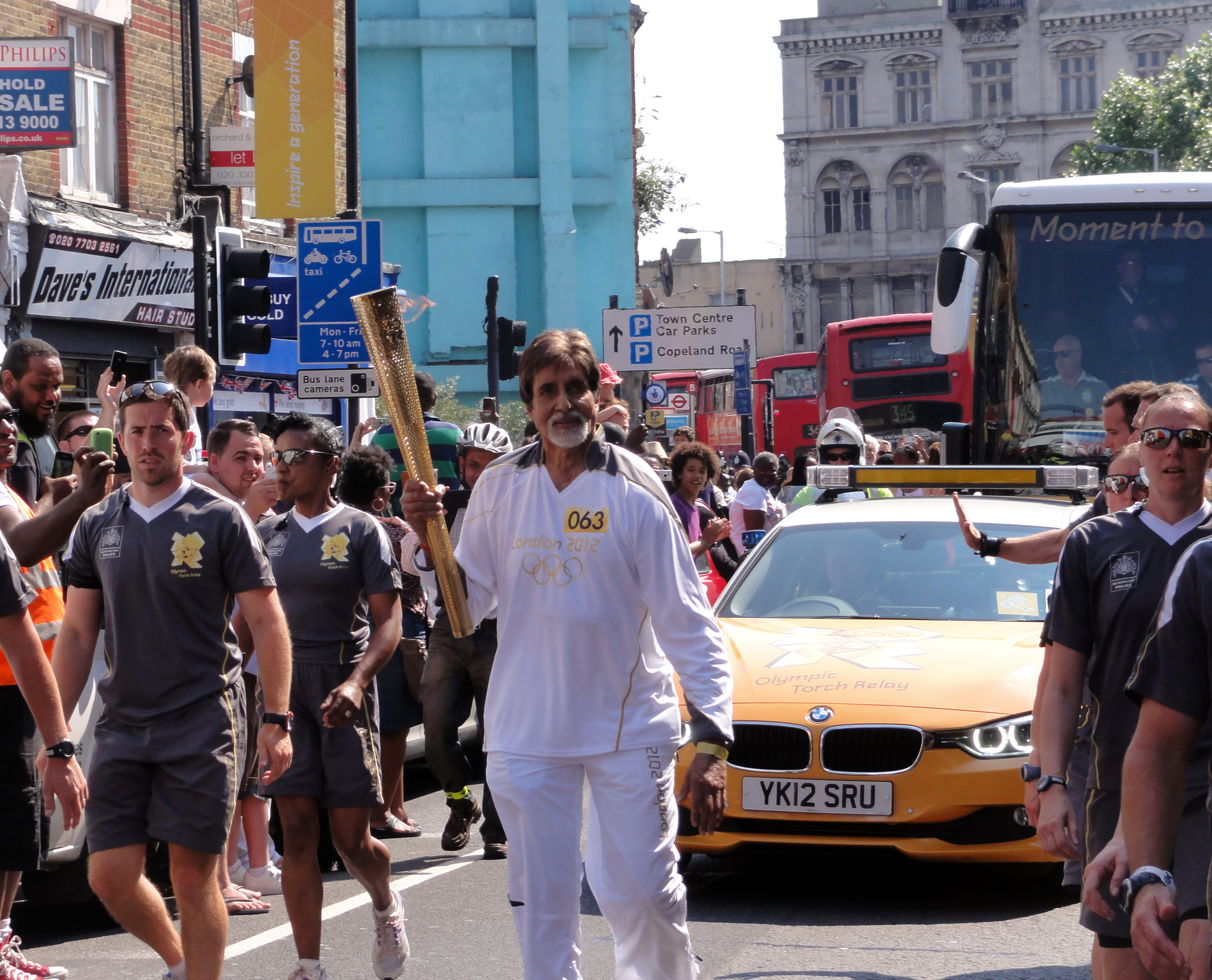
Bachchan with the Olympic flame in London on 27 July 2012

France's highest civilian honour, the Officer of the Legion of Honour, was conferred upon him by the French Government in 2007 for his "exceptional career in the world of cinema and beyond". On 27 July 2012, at the age of 69, Bachchan carried the Olympic torch during the last leg of its relay in London's Southwark.

== Bibliography ==
- Soul Curry for You and Me – An Empowering Philosophy That Can Enrich Your Life. (2002)

== See also ==
- Angry young man (India)
- Angry Young Men (miniseries)
- List of Bollywood actors
- Lists of Indian actors
