= Khoon Pasina =

- Directed by: Rakesh Kumar
- Written by: Kader Khan; Rakesh Kumar; K.K. Shukla
- Produced by: Babboo Mehra
- Starring: Amitabh Bachchan; Vinod Khanna; Rekha; Nirupa Roy; Asrani; Aruna Irani; Kader Khan; Ranjeet
- Cinematography: Ishan Arya
- Edited by: R. Mahadik
- Music by: Kalyanji-Anandji
- Distributed by: Prakash Mehra Productions
- Release date: 21 January 1977
- Running time: 151 mins
- Country: India
- Language: Hindi

Khoon Pasina (Hindi: खून पसीना, Blood and Sweat) is a 1977 Hindi action crime film. The movie is produced by Baboo Mehra and Prakash Mehra and directed by Rakesh Kumar. The movie stars Amitabh Bachchan, Vinod Khanna, Rekha, Nirupa Roy, Asrani, Aruna Irani, Bharat Bhushan and Kader Khan. The music is by Kalyanji Anandji. Khoon Pasina was another "super hit" "angry young man" film with Amitabh Bachchan.

It was remade in Telugu as Tiger (1979) with N. T. Rama Rao and in Tamil by Rajinikanth as Siva (1989).

== Plot ==
Two great friends get separated and their families are terminated by the main villain. The two boys grow up and fight crime individually. One of them, Shiva/Tiger, is good natured and socially amiable and has a mother. Eventually, he falls in love with the heroine and marries her. Shiva gets blamed for the murder of an innocent farmer. On his mother's and wife's behest, Shiva leaves the village and tries to lead an honest and nonviolent life in a faraway village. The other hero Shera/Aslam too fights crime and criminals but is taciturn and a loner. He gets entrusted with the task of avenging Asrani's death. He tracks Shiva and eventually they both realize that they are long lost friends. Shera also learns that Shiva is innocent. Both of them team up and beat up all the villains.

== Cast ==
- Amitabh Bachchan as Shiva / Tiger
- Vinod Khanna as Aslam Sher Khan / Shera
- Rekha as Chanda
- Nirupa Roy as Shiva's mother
- Asrani as Mohan Sharma
- Kader Khan as Zaalim Singh, the main antagonist
- Ranjeet as Raghu
- Bharat Bhushan as Kaka
- Aruna Irani
- Mohan Sherry
- Helen as the dancer

== Soundtrack ==
#	Title	Singer(s)
1	"Bani Rahe Jodi Raja Rani Ki Jodi Re"	Kishore Kumar
2	"Khoon Pasine Ki Jo Milegi To Khayenge"	Kishore Kumar
3	"Raja Dil Mangey Chavanny Uchhal Ke"	Asha Bhosle
4	"Main Teri Ho Gayee Tu Mera Ho Gaya"	Lata Mangeshkar
