= Laawaris (1981 film) =

1981 film by Prakash Mehra

- Film poster
- Directed by: Prakash Mehra
- Written by: Shashi Bhushan; Kader Khan; Prakash Mehra; Din Dayal Sharma
- Produced by: Prakash Mehra
- Starring: Amitabh Bachchan; Zeenat Aman; Amjad Khan; Suresh Oberoi; Ranjeet; Bindu; Om Prakash
- Cinematography: N. Satyen
- Music by: Kalyanji-Anandji
- Release date: 22 May 1981
- Running time: 189 minutes
- Country: India
- Language: Hindi
- Box office: ₹9 crores

Laawaris (transl. Orphan) is a 1981 Indian masala film directed and produced by Prakash Mehra. It is one of Amitabh Bachchan's "Angry Young Man" films, where he co-stars with Zeenat Aman and Amjad Khan. It follows the story of an orphan who embarks on a journey to uncover the truth about his parents.

The film gained notable recognition for its song "Mere Angene Mein Tumhara Kya Kaam Hai" (roughly translated as: "In my courtyard, what is your purpose?"). The song was rendered twice: first by a young Alka Yagnik, earning her a Filmfare nomination for Best Female Playback Singer, and later by Amitabh Bachchan. Bachchan's comedic performance in drag during the second rendition contributed to the song's immense popularity. The lyrics humorously pay tribute to wives of all types, regardless of their physical appearance. The song remains popular among audiences to this day.

Laawaris was a commercial success, declared a "super-hit" at the box office by Box Office India. It ranked as the fourth-highest-grossing Hindi film of 1981. The film also received additional Filmfare nominations, including Best Actor for Amitabh Bachchan and Best Supporting Actor for Suresh Oberoi.

== Plot ==
In 1951 Vidya (Raakhee) is a famous singer and she is in love with Ranvir Singh (Amjad Khan), a leading businessman. She discovers she is pregnant with his child but Ranvir Singh wants it to be aborted. Vidya who doesn't want to abort her child decides to break up with Ranvir Singh and she leaves with her brother without informing Ranvir Singh. Vidya dies while giving birth to a baby boy but her brother takes away the baby and gives it to his driver, Gangu Ganpat, asking it to be killed. Meanwhile, Gangu Ganpat, a drunkard decides to raise the baby on his own instead of killing it with the intention of making some money with the help of the baby. He names the baby as Heera. 30 years later in 1981 when a grown-up Heera (Amitabh Bachchan) refuses to give Gangu liquor, an angry Gangu reveals his status as an orphan and an angry Heera leaves him.

Heera gets a job in a factory which is owned by Mahendar Singh (Ranjeet), who happens to be the son of Ranvir Singh (with his legally wedded wife and half-brother of Heera). It is shown that Ranvir Singh leads an unhappy life with his wife in an estate. He feels guilty about his betrayal to Vidya thinking she is dead.

Once employed at Mahendar Singh's factory, Heera understands that workers are not paid properly in Mahendar Singh's factory and decides to fight against it which angers Mahendar Singh. Mohini (Zeenat Aman) the daughter of Kailashnath, falls in love with Heera without knowing his true identity. Mahendar Singh transfers Heera to work in his estate present at a hill station with plans of killing him. Heera meets Ranvir Singh in the estate and gets into his good books. During a function, Mahendar Singh plans to kill Heera, but accidentally Ranvir Singh gets hurt. In the climax Ranvir Singh accepts Heera as his legitimate son and unites with his whole family.

== Cast ==
- Amitabh Bachchan as Heera Thakur
- Zeenat Aman as Mohiniyattam
- Raakhee as Vidya (Special Appearance)
- Ranjeet as Mahendra Singh Dhoni
- Bindu as Kamini Singhal
- Amjad Khan as Ranveer Kapoor
- Suresh Oberoi as Ram Singh Khan
- Padmini Kapila as Padma Chakki
- Jeevan as Lala Kedarnath
- Om Prakash as Dr. Lovekesh Goel
- Satyen Kappu as Kailaash Satyarth
- Mukri as Gafoor Swami
- Shreeram Lagoo as Gangu Ganpat Singh
- Ram Sethi as Amit
- Preeti Sapru as Chanchal
- Yunus Parvez as Mukadam
- Viju Khote as Manager who insisted Hira for his father's name
- Goga Kapoor as Phunga

== Soundtrack ==
The music of this movie was composed by Kalyanji–Anandji, while the lyrics were written by Anjaan and Prakash Mehra. Vocals are supplied by Kishore Kumar (for Amitabh Bachchan), Asha Bhosle (for Zeenat Aman), Alka Yagnik (for Raakhee Gulzar) and Bachchan. The movie features some popular songs like "Apni Toh Jaise Taise" sung by Kumar and "Mere Angne Mein", whose male version was sung by Bachchan.

The song "Apni Toh Jaise Taise" was recreated by Shankar–Ehsaan–Loy in the voice of Mika Singh and Sunidhi Chauhan in the 2010 film Housefull. The song "Mere Angne Mein" was recreated by Tanishk Bagchi in the year 2020 in the voice of Neha Kakkar and Raja Hassan. Both the music videos starred Sri Lankan actress Jacqueline Fernandez.

Song	Singer	Raga
"Jiska Koi Nahin Uska Tau Khuda Hai Yaaro"	Kishore Kumar	Bhairavi (Hindustani)
"Apni To Jaise Taise"	Kishore Kumar	
"Kaahe Paise Pe Itna Ghuroor Kare Hai"	Kishore Kumar	Shivaranjani
"Kabke Bichhde Hue Hum Aaj Yahan Aake Mile"	Kishore Kumar, Asha Bhosle	
"Mere Angne Mein"	Amitabh Bachchan	
"Mere Angne Mein"	Alka Yagnik	
"Jiska Koi Nahin"	Manna Dey	

== Remakes ==
Laawaris was remade as

- Naa Desam, in Telugu in 1982, starring N. T. Rama Rao, Kaikala Satyanarayana and Jayasudha.
- Panakkaran, in Tamil in 1990, starring Rajinikanth, Vijayakumar and Gautami.

== Awards and nominations ==
Award & Category	Artist	Status	Notes
Filmfare Awards (1982)
Best Actor	Amitabh Bachchan	Nominated	
Best Supporting Actor	Suresh Oberoi	Nominated	
Best Female Playback Singer	Alka Yagnik	Nominated	for song "Mere Angne Mein"
