= Shahenshah (1988 film) =

1988 Indian film by Tinnu Anand

- Movie poster
- Directed by: Tinnu Anand
- Written by: Inder Raj Anand
- Screenplay by: Santosh Saroj
- Story by: Jaya Bachchan
- Produced by: Bitu Anand; Tinnu Anand; Naresh Malhotra
- Starring: Amitabh Bachchan; Meenakshi Sheshadri; Pran; Amrish Puri; Aruna Irani; Prem Chopra; Sharat Saxena; Murad
- Cinematography: Peter Pereira
- Edited by: A. Habib
- Music by: Amar Haldipur; Utpal Biswas
- Production company: Shiva Video
- Release date: 12 February 1988
- Running time: 175 minutes
- Country: India
- Language: Hindi
- Box office: ₹19.19 crore

Shahenshah (transl. Emperor) is a 1988 Indian Hindi-language vigilante action film produced and directed by Tinnu Anand with story by Jaya Bachchan and script by Inder Raj Anand (who died before the film was released). The film stars Amitabh Bachchan in the titular role, alongside Meenakshi Sheshadri, Praan, Amrish Puri, Prem Chopra and Sharat Saxena and Murad in supporting roles. The film marks Bachchan's comeback to films (and to the "Angry Young Man" persona) after a three-year hiatus during which he had entered politics. Bachchan still had films releasing during the hiatus as they were projects, which he had previously completed.

Shahenshah became the second highest-grossing Indian film of 1988 despite strong competition from Tezaab and Qayamat Se Qayamat Tak. The dialogue "Rishte Mein To Hum Tumhare Baap Hote Hain, Naam Hai Shahenshah" also became one of the popular dialogues. It was also remembered for Meenakshi Sheshadri's performance and Amitabh Bachchan's double performances and single role and single fictional character and double costume.

== Plot ==
Mathur, a corrupt bank manager, has illegally borrowed ₹2.5 million and loaned them to J.K. Verma, a crime baron, who orchestrates a bank robbery to bail him out. DCP Anand Kumar Srivastava gets wind of this plot and is about to crack the case when J.K. enlists Julie, an exotic dancer, to use the robbery as a backdrop and frame Anand for corruption. Anand is arrested by the CBI and is imprisoned for three months. Anand gets depressed about the false charges and commits suicide after being released on bail. This creates a lasting and powerful impression on his son Inspector Vijay Kumar Srivastava.

Vijay retains the noose, which his father used to hang himself and vows to restore his father's honour. Vijay and his mother leave their house and live in the house of Inspector Aslam Khan. Years later, Vijay becomes a cop and is friends with Aslam's daughter Shaheena. Aslam is an honest cop like Anand, while Vijay is an obsequious and cowardly Inspector, who is prone to bribery and generally scared of powerful criminals. It does not take JK long to find Vijay, where he gets him on the payroll and run his crime empire past the cops. It is revealed that Vijay is living a dual life as Shahenshah, a costumed crime-fighter, who punishes anyone for committing crimes.

Vijay's outward mission is to eradicate crime and track the perpetrators behind Anand's death. Shahenshah quietly breaks up several of J.K.'s gambling dens and illicit liquor distilleries, where he also halts the demolition of a slum. This catches the eye of small-time trickster Shalu, who lives there with her aging and ailing mother Julie. J.K. had ordered her assassination after she helped frame Vijay's father. Julie has been on the run from him ever since, which becomes Shalu's motivation for seeking out and eliminating J.K. Shalu decides to infiltrate J.K.'s coterie by becoming an exotic dancer. One night, Shalu attempts to kill J.K. by shooting him, but is shocked when J.K. reveals he had been wearing a bullet-proof vest all the time.

Vijay lies to J.K. that Shahenshah's weakness is not Shalu's death and also lies that if J.K. returns Shalu to Shahenshah, Shahenshah will return J. K.'s goods worth millions. However, J.K. is fooled and Shahenshah detonates a bomb planted in J.K.'s truck. J.K. kills Mohammed Salim, a crime reporter and Shaheena's husband, who was about to expose J.K.'s crime ring. Vijay decides to turn around his image as a cowardly cop and openly defies J.K. Julie agrees to testify against J.K. and Shalu provides evidence. J.K. prepares for a war against Vijay, Shalu and his nemesis. At Salim's funeral, a person reveals that he witnessed Salim's death and is about to reveal J.K.'s name, but an assassin kills him.

A veritable bloodbath on the streets ensues as Vijay tries to get Julie into the courthouse. A final showdown occurs, where Shahenshah reveals his secret identity and becomes the nemesis for the culprits. To give himself a chance to escape, J.K. abducts Shalu and a showdown leads Shahenshah to chase after J.K. to the roof of the courthouse, where J.K. is pleading his case as his cover is blown. J.K. falls through a hole in the roof and is clinging on for dear life, with the whole court looking in astonishment. Shahenshah reveals his identity before the whole court and throws the noose down to J.K., who attempts to attack Vijay. Vijay lets go of the noose, which slips around J.K.'s neck and is hanged, thus avenging Anand and Salim's death.

== Cast ==
- Amitabh Bachchan as Inspector Vijay Kumar Srivastava / Shahenshah
  - Aftab Shivdasani as Young Vijay Kumar Srivastava
- Meenakshi Sheshadri as Shalu
- Pran as Inspector Aslam, Anand's friend
- Aruna Irani as Julie
- Prem Chopra as Bank Manager Mathur
- Amrish Puri as J.K., the main antagonist
- Kader Khan as D.C.P Anand Kumar Srivastava
- Rohini Hattangadi as Shanti Srivastava
- Supriya Pathak as Shaheen, Salim's wife
- Vijayendra Ghatge as Editor Mohammed Salim
- Jagdeep as Tarachand Badlani
- Sudhir as Jaichand, J.K's man
- Avtar Gill as Corrupt Police Officer D'Souza
- Anjan Srivastav as Corrupt Politician Patil
- Sharat Saxena as Abdul
- Praveen Kumar Sobti as Mukhtar Singh
- Dan Dhanoa as Naresh, J.K.'s goon
- Goga Kapoor as Randhir, J.K's lawyer
- Dinesh Hingoo as Laal Singh, Shalu's friend
- Sameer Khakhar as Balram, Shalu's drunkard friend
- Murad as Judge Jaiswal
- Yunus Parvez as Journalist Saxena

== Production ==
Tinnu Anand, who had made the very successful film Kaalia (1981) with Amitabh Bachchan, wanted to make another film with him during the early 1980s. The story of Shahenshah was written by Jaya Bachchan and further refined by Tinnu Anand's father Inder Raj Anand. Even though Anand signed up Bachchan in 1983, the film could not commence shooting because only three days before shooting was to begin in Bangalore, Amitabh fell seriously ill. After a thorough medical examination it was revealed that he had developed myasthenia gravis, a rare chronic autoimmune disease marked by muscular weakness without atrophy.

Due to Amitabh's illness and his commitments to other movies, the shooting was delayed until 1985. By this time, the female lead of the film, Dimple Kapadia, was replaced by Meenakshi Sheshadri. The iconic costume that Amitabh donned in this movie weighed almost 18 kg, and despite his illness, Amitabh insisted on wearing the costume in all of his fight scenes. During shooting, Amitabh and Tinnu got into a disagreement over one particular scene in which Tinnu wanted Amitabh to wear his police uniform, but Amitabh insisted on wearing a blazer instead. The argument got quite heated and with neither of the two willing to change his stance, shooting was temporarily halted. It was not until Tinnu's father, Inder Raj Anand, intervened and convinced Amitabh to wear the police uniform by explaining its significance in the scene that the shooting resumed.

The shooting eventually wrapped up in October 1987. Even though the film was initially planned to be released in November, the release date kept on being pushed back due to the threat of a boycott of the film by some opposition political parties. These parties had had some conflict with Bachchan, while he was a Congress MP, and they maintained bitterness towards him even after he had retired from politics.

== Soundtrack ==
The music of the film was composed by Amar Haldipur and Utpal Biswas and lyrics of all songs were written by Anand Bakshi.

Track list
No.	Title	Singer(s)	Length
1.	"Andheri Raaton Mein"	Kishore Kumar
2.	"Hoga Thanedaar Tu Mera Dildaar Tu"	Kishore Kumar; Lata Mangeshkar
3.	"Jane Do, Jane Do, Mujhe Jana Hai, Vada Jo Kiya Hai Woh Nibhana Hai"	Lata Mangeshkar; Mohammed Aziz
4.	"O Behna, O Behna (Happy)"	Mohammed Aziz
5.	"O Behna, O Behna (Sad)"	Mohammed Aziz
6.	"Hey You"	Asha Bhonsle

== Awards ==
34th Filmfare Awards:

Nominated

- Best Actor – Amitabh Bachchan
