= Anusandhan (1981 film) =

1981 Indian Bengali action film by Shakti Samanta

- Theatrical poster of Anusandhan
- Directed by: Shakti Samanta
- Screenplay by: Shaktipada Rajguru; Shakti Samanta
- Dialogues by: Bengali: Prabhat Roy; Hindi: Kamleshwar
- Based on: Anusandhan by Shaktipada Rajguru
- Produced by: Shakti Samanta
- Starring: Amitabh Bachchan; Raakhee; Amjad Khan; Utpal Dutt
- Cinematography: Aloke Dasgupta
- Edited by: Bijoy Chowdhury
- Music by: R. D. Burman
- Production company: Shakti Films
- Distributed by: Shakti Films
- Release dates: 4 February 1981 (Bengali); 20 February 1981 (Hindi)
- Running time: 142 mins
- Country: India
- Languages: Bengali; Hindi

Anusandhan (in Bengali; /ə.nʊ.sən.d̪ʱaːn/ transl. Discovery) or Barsaat Ki Ek Raat (in Hindi; /bər.saːt kiː ek raːt/ transl. A Rainy Night) is a 1981 Indian bilingual action thriller film made in both Bengali and Hindi languages, produced and directed by Shakti Samanta under his banner of Shakti Films. Based on a novel of the same name by Shaktipada Rajguru, it stars Amitabh Bachchan in his debut in Bengali cinema, alongside Rakhee Gulzar, Amjad Khan, Utpal Dutt and Abhi Bhattacharya in lead roles. The film follows Inspector Abhijeet Rai in search of Kaliram, a criminal whom he arrested five years ago, after his pregnant wife gets injured by the latter.

The film marks the second collaboration between Samanta and Bachchan. Majorly filmed in Darjeeling, some portions of the film were shot in Kolkata and Mumbai. Music of the film is composed by R. D. Burman, with lyrics penned by Gauriprasanna Mazumder and Anand Bakshi in Bengali and Hindi respectively. Rajguru himself wrote the screenplay of both the versions, while Prabhat Roy and Kamleshwar served as the dialogue writers. Aloke Dasgupta and Bijoy Chowdhury handled its cinematography and editing respectively.

For the Bengali film, Bachchan himself dubbed his own voice, whereas he learned the lingual pronunciation from Prabhat Roy and Jaya Bhaduri, his wife. The film is remembered for the classic songs "Haye Re Pora Banshi, "Amar Swapno Je" and "Phete Gelo Kaliramer Dhol". The first song was remade by the Bombay Bicycle Club and the second was used in the international song Funky Bijou Anthem.

== Plot ==
In Takdah tea estate in Darjeeling, Hariya Sahu, famous as Sahuji, is a merchant who has woven a web of corruption in every layer of the social fabric. He supplies materials of inferior quality to the tea garden, and then bribes the accountants to approve his bills. When one of the managers Suresh, who is also known as Boro Babu, resists, Sahuji pays the workers to go on a strike against Boro Babu. Besides, he is also involved in rampant smuggling of goods across the border, and everyone from the local jeweler to the local police inspector are part of his intricate web.

While the father has created a position of influence by spreading corruption, his son Kaaliram has ushered in a reign of terror. He goes to local bars, drinks, and doesn't pay. Anyone standing in his way gets beaten up mercilessly, either by him or his thugs. After getting sufficiently intoxicated, he then indulges in carnal desire by forcefully taking away any of the unmarried village girls for a night of merriment. If the poor girl's parents try to fight back, their house is set on fire. Desperate villagers make a plea to the owner of the tea garden, who calls (presumably) the higher ups in police force and they promise to send someone.

Next day, while crossing a bridge, Kaaliram and his thugs meet a mysterious stranger on a mule, whose face is completely covered in a Sombrero-type hat popular in that region. The stranger, named Abhijeet, doesn't seem to be aware of Kaali's reputation and has no hesitation in fighting back strongly. Kaali vows to take revenge, but on a number of subsequent encounters, including a drum-playing competition during Durga Puja, Kaali loses to Abhijeet every time. However, the ever so loyal police inspector, always comes to his rescue and prevents him from being sent to jail. However, Kaali's frustration grows.

In the meanwhile, Abhijeet meets and falls in love with Tamosha (in Bengali) or Rajni (in Hindi), the blind daughter of the Boro Babu. One rainy night, Kaali attempts to molest Tamosha, but Abhijeet comes to her rescue. When the police inspector again attempts to drag his feet, Abhijeet erupts in anger, shows his identity as a very high level police officer, throws Kaali into jail, and suspends the police officer.

Abhijeet marries Tamosha and they settle down in a quaint little village named Sonarpur, awaiting the birth of their first child. Meanwhile, Kaali gets out of jail and finds the whereabouts of Abhijeet and Tamosha. He sends Abhijeet away from home by making a fake call for help, and then, enters Abhijeet's home and attacks Tamosha, causing her to miscarry.

A clue found outside the house ties Kaali with the incident, and Abhijeet confronts him. However, as he is about to drag the handcuffed Kaali to the police station, Sahuji, in an attempt to shoot Abhijeet, ends up killing his son. The story ends with justice, divine and otherwise, presumed to have been served to all (except the unborn child).

== Cast ==
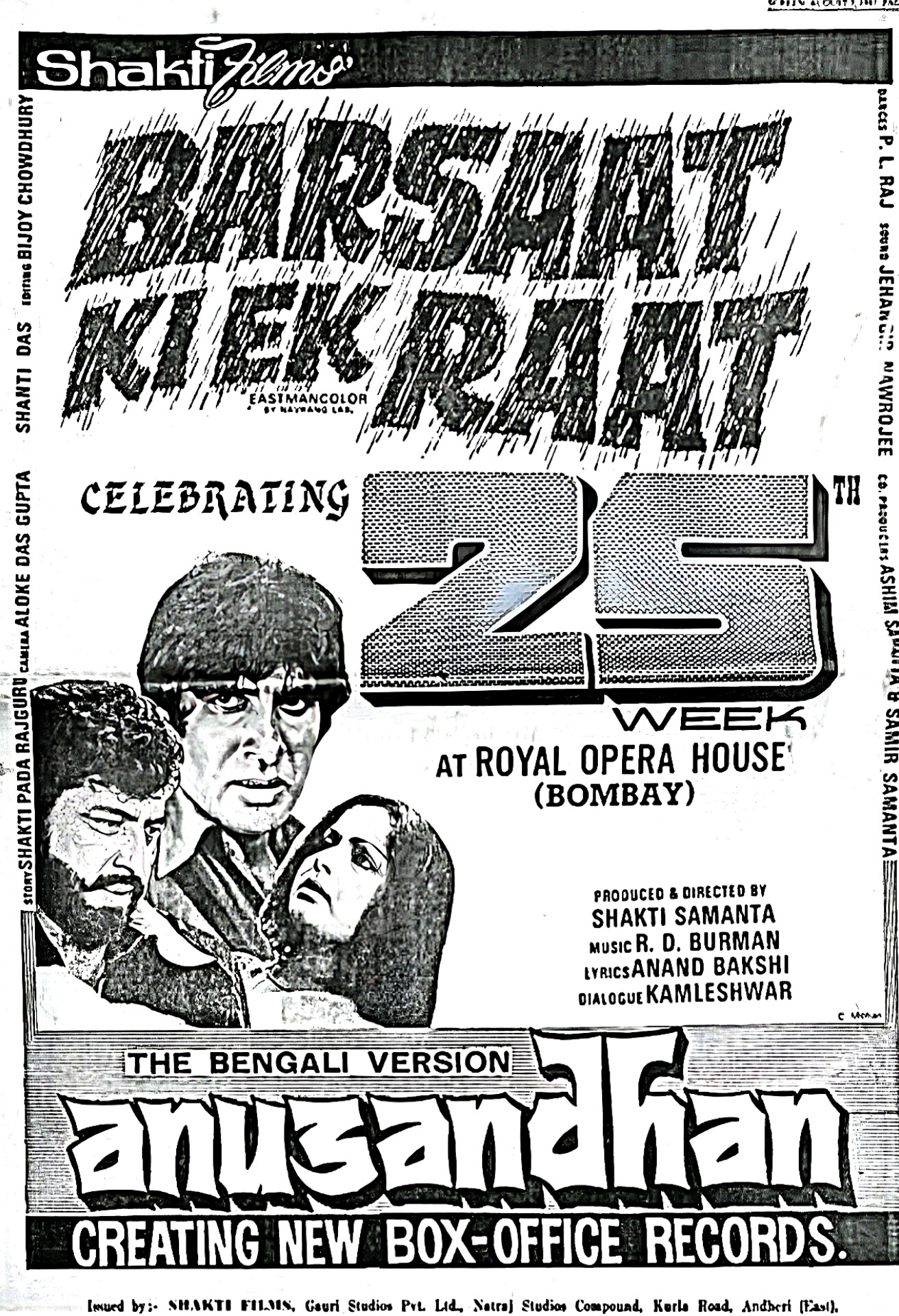
The silver jubliee poster of Anusandhan and Barsaat Ki Ek Raat.

- Amitabh Bachchan as Inspector Abhijeet Ray
- Rakhee Gulzar as Tamosha (in Bengali version) / Rajni (in Hindi version)
- Amjad Khan as Kaaliram Sahu
- Utpal Dutt as Hariya Sahu,Kaaliram's father
- Abhi Bhattacharya as Suresh / Boro Babu (Tamosha's father)
- Prema Narayan as Phuli (in Bengali version) /Phulwa (in Hindi version)
- Asit Sen as Police inspector
- Sujit Kumar
- Nimu Bhowmik as Doctor

== Soundtrack ==
=== Bengali ===
All lyrics are written by Gouri Prasanna Majumdar; all music is composed by Rahul Dev Burman.

Songs
No.	Title	Playback	Length
1.	"Amar Shopno Je"	Kishore Kumar, Lata Mangeshkar
2.	"Haye Re Poda Bashi"	Lata Mangeshkar
3.	"Hori Bol Hori Bol"	Kishore Kumar
4.	"Phulkoli Re Phulkoli"	Kishore Kumar, Asha Bhosle
5.	"Otho Otho Shurjai Re"	Lata Mangeshkar

=== Hindi ===
All lyrics are written by Anand Bakshi; all music is composed by Rahul Dev Burman.

Songs
No.	Title	Playback	Length
1.	"Apne Pyar Ke"	Kishore Kumar, Lata Mangeshkar
2.	"Haye Wo Pardesi"	Lata Mangeshkar
3.	"Kaliram Ka Dhol"	Kishore Kumar
4.	"Manchali O Manchali"	Kishore Kumar, Asha Bhosle
5.	"Nadiya Kinare Pe"	Lata Mangeshkar
