= Shaan (1980 film) =

1980 Indian film by Ramesh Sippy

- Poster
- Directed by: Ramesh Sippy
- Written by: Salim–Javed
- Produced by: G. P. Sippy
- Starring: Sunil Dutt; Shashi Kapoor; Amitabh Bachchan; Shatrughan Sinha; Raakhee Gulzar; Parveen Babi; Bindiya Goswami; Johnny Walker; Kulbhushan Kharbanda
- Cinematography: S. M. Anwar
- Edited by: M. S. Shinde
- Music by: R. D. Burman
- Production company: Sippy Films
- Distributed by: Eros International; Rajshri Productions
- Release date: 12 December 1980 (India)
- Running time: 181 minutes (DVD); 208 minutes (VHS)
- Country: India
- Language: Hindi
- Budget: ₹42-42.5 million
- Box office: ₹85-125 million

Shaan (translation: Grandeur) is a 1980 Indian Hindi-language action crime film directed by Ramesh Sippy and produced by G. P. Sippy under the production banner of Sippy Films with a story written by Salim–Javed after the blockbuster success of Sholay (1975).

The film was released in India on 12 December 1980 and was a multi-starrer with Sunil Dutt, Shashi Kapoor, Amitabh Bachchan, Shatrughan Sinha, Raakhee Gulzar, Parveen Babi, Bindiya Goswami, Johnny Walker and Kulbhushan Kharbanda.

Shaan was the most expensive Indian film made until then, and was an average performer at the box-office upon initial release, but did good business during re-runs. The film follows the murder of a police officer, Shiv (Dutt), whose two conmen brothers, Vijay (Bachchan) and Ravi (Kapoor), reform and join hands with a marksman, Rakesh (Sinha), to seek revenge from the culprit that is the invincible Shakaal (Kharbanda). The character of Shakaal was inspired from the Ernst Stavro Blofeld's character from the James Bond film series.

The music was composed by R. D. Burman. Burman's songs received a Best Music nomination at Filmfare Awards. Shaan was one of the last films to feature songs sung by Mohammed Rafi.

== Plot ==
DCP Shiv Kumar (Sunil Dutt), an honest, brave, and upright police officer, lives with his wife, Sheetal (Raakhee Gulzar), and their young daughter, Guddi, and soon gets transferred to Mumbai. Shiv has two estranged younger brothers, Vijay (Amitabh Bachchan) and Ravi (Shashi Kapoor), who reside in Mumbai together. They are both intelligent and capable youths, but spend their time conning wealthy individuals. In one of their scams, the duo convinces a corrupt hotel manager (Yunus Parvez) that Vijay has stolen diamonds worth ₹2.5 Lakhs, while Ravi, a police officer, is searching for the criminal. The opportunistic manager offers to purchase the diamonds stolen by Vijay for ₹10,000, when Ravi returns and threatens to arrest the manager as well for helping a criminal. In exchange for releasing him, the manager pays an additional bribe of ₹5,000 to Ravi, who then pretends to arrest Vijay for his crime. Later, at a restaurant, the duo meets a pretty young girl, Pushpa Bhargav (Bindiya Goswami), who owes a debt of ₹30,000 to a middle-aged, aggressive man (Johnny Walker). The due date is past and the debtor threatens to initiate legal actions against Pushpa. Ravi finds himself attracted to Pushpa, who offers her Porsche car against the debt to the debtor, the value of her car being at least ₹1 Lakh. As a result, the duo offers to help Pushpa by purchasing her car for ₹30,000 and clearing her debt to the debtor, much to Pushpa's relief and gratitude. However, after their departure from the restaurant, the duo finds themselves being arrested by the police, who reveal that the car was actually stolen and has a different owner. After their release from prison, the duo seek the aid of Abdul (Mazhar Khan), a legless, but dignified beggar, who is their regular informer about shady characters. Abdul informs the duo that Pushpa's real name is Renu and that the debtor is actually her own paternal uncle, whom she refers to as Chacha. The duo also tracks Renu and Chacha down, but manages to retrieve only ₹25,000 as the remaining ₹5,000 have been already spent. Impressed with their deceiving skills, the duo advises Renu and Chacha to join forces with them in conning individuals. The four con artists' next plan is to steal a diamond necklace from an erstwhile queen, Maharani (Bindu), who is attending a lavish party at a hotel one night. Nevertheless, a glamorous thief, Sunita (Parveen Babi), manages to steal Maharani's necklace before the four con artists can do so. The police arrive and begin a search of every individual at the hotel, when Vijay notices Sunita slipping the necklace into his pocket. However, he manages to escape by hiding the necklace in his walking stick and is now aided by Sunita. As a result, Vijay falls in love with Sunita and invites her to join his gang of con artists.

The following scam of the five con artists is that Vijay and Ravi are two elderly godmen, who claim to present the physically impossible, "superhuman" feat of walking on water. However, this scam backfires as the same day, Shiv arrives in Mumbai with Sheetal and Guddi and reads the advertisement posters for the "godmen" at the railway station. As a result, Shiv, who is the symbol of law, catches the five con artists red-handed and arrests them all, despite the fact of Vijay and Ravi being his own brothers. After serving their sentence in prison, the five con artists are all released soon and vow to reform together. Despite their earlier friction with the law, a generous Shiv forgives Vijay and Ravi and hopes to shape them both into a much honourable life. Meanwhile, a mysterious man (Shatrughan Sinha) attempts to shoot Shiv twice in Mumbai, but Shiv is fortunate to survive both times. Thus, Vijay and Ravi advise their brother to find a different line of work, stating that his profession is unpredictable, dangerous, and unsuitable for a family man, especially for a husband and a father. However, Shiv firmly refuses to resign from the police force, citing his undying patriotic commitment to his corps and his country. Meanwhile, Shiv is investigating a gang of international smugglers, and it eventually turns out that they are all working for Shakaal (Kulbhushan Kharbanda), a sadistic international crime lord, who is operating from a remote, high-technology island outside India, while funding crime in Mumbai and rejoicing in the pain of all his enemies and traitors. Shakaal is known for his eccentricities and innovations, for his island being equipped with hidden cameras, a variety of automatic gadgets, a pack of wild hunting dogs, and a man-eating crocodile in an artificial pond below a revolving table with seats. Shakaal eliminates Ranjeet (Sudhir), one of his own henchmen, by dropping him into the pond as a "prey" for the crocodile, having smartly discovered that Ranjeet was an informer to Shiv. Meanwhile, Shiv is progressively near to discovering the root of the smuggling in Mumbai. Thus, Shakaal cleverly has his henchmen kidnap Shiv and bring him to his island, where he informs Shiv that he had himself arranged the previous two attempts on his life. Moreover, the cunning Shakaal threatens to kill Shiv himself now unless Shiv agrees to join his criminal empire. However, Shiv attempts an escape from the island, choosing his own duty, principles, and dignity over wealth and success. Although Shiv manages to avoid the unleashed wild dogs, Shakaal eventually shoots him fatally on the beach nearby from his helicopter, and has Shiv's dead body dumped back to Mumbai.

As Sheetal, Vijay, and Ravi lament the tragic death of Shiv, the mysterious man, who attempted to shoot Shiv twice, finally approaches the Kumar household. He introduces himself as Rakesh, a marksman and former circus performer, who is skilled to shoot targets blindfolded. Sheetal identifies Rakesh and believing him to be her husband's murderer, attempts to shoot him in a fit of rage, but Vijay and Ravi prevent her wisely. Moreover, Rakesh confesses about his own innocence, revealing that Shakaal had actually kidnapped his wife, Roma (Padmini Kapila), and blackmailed him that he will kill her unless Rakesh shoots Shiv to death. However, the helpless Rakesh had deliberately missed his aim on Shiv in the two previous attempts, hoping to buy time to save Roma. However, Shakaal, having already deduced this, retaliated by deliberately releasing Roma in a car with failed brakes, resulting in her tragic death in a inflamed accident which Rakesh failed to prevent miserably. After learning this, Vijay and Ravi join hands with Rakesh, the trio is determined to bring Shakaal to justice together in order to avenge Shiv and Roma's deaths. Around the same time, Rakesh and Sheetal are both implied to be falling in love with the consent of Guddi. To that end, the trio seeks the aid of Abdul, who provides them with information about Shakaal's contraband warehouse in Mumbai. Although the trio manages to destruct the warehouse, a furious Shakaal retaliates by having his henchmen target Sheetal and Guddi on a remote bridge. Nevertheless, Rakesh saves them both with the help of some horses in the stable of a farmhouse nearby. Despite this, Shakaal's henchmen discover Abdul being the trio's informer and pursue him in the middle of a night. Eventually, Abdul meets his tragic death after being thrown off a bridge, which is raised even as he attempts to cross it. As a result, a furious Vijay breaks into the illegal bar, where Shakaal's henchmen spend time playing cards, and thrashes them all severely in revenge for Abdul's death.

Eventually, a frustrated Shakaal swears death on the trio. Moreover, he plays his next move of having his henchmen kidnap Sheetal and imprison her at his island. Meanwhile, it would have appeared that the trio is about concede defeat over Sheetal's imminent. However, in a surprising turn of events, one of Shakaal's henchmen, Jagmohan (Mac Mohan), approaches the Kumar household himself in a gravely injured condition. A disgruntled Jagmohan ostensibly offers to help the trio to enter Shakaal's island, citing that the merciless Shakaal had thrashed him nearly to death for a trivial failure. Thus, the trio, Sunita, Renu, and Chacha, posing as a dance troupe, manages to infiltrate Shakaal's island and performs for his gang together. Nevertheless, Shakaal later has his henchmen capture the complete group, revealing, in a twisted climax, that he had actually sent Jagmohan himself to trap them and that Jagmohan had been faking his injuries. However, Chacha creates a commotion which allows the trio to be freed and successfully thrash Jagmohan and Shakaal's remaining henchmen to death. In an elaborate sequence of survival challenges which ensues, Shakaal drops Vijay into the pond of the crocodile, while in a chamber filled with poisonous gas, two of Shakaal's special henchmen, who are both wearing gas masks, get into a combat with Ravi and Rakesh, respectively. Nevertheless, the trio avoids all the booby traps as Vijay heroically kills the crocodile, while Ravi and Rakesh also fatally poison the two henchmen themselves with the gas. Finally, the trio succeeds in capturing Shakaal and is about to kill him using his own brutal methods, but Sheetal intervenes and refuses to let them do so, pointing out that their action can be disrespectful to the law the late Shiv upholds. The arguing commotion allows Shakaal to free himself and attempt a final betrayal, forcing the trio to shoot him fatally in self-defence. With his dying breath, Shakaal activates the self-destruct mechanism of the island, stating that if he could not win himself, he would not let others emerge victorious either. Despite this, the complete group is able to escape the exploding island narrowly in one of Shakaal's own helicopters, having defeated Shakaal in his tracks for good. The film ends with the trio, their respective girlfriends, and Chacha flying off together in the helicopter driven by Rakesh to safety and freedom, satisfied that they have all finally ended Shakaal's ignominious existence.

== Cast ==
- Sunil Dutt as DCP Shiv Kumar
- Shashi Kapoor as Ravi Kumar
- Amitabh Bachchan as Vijay Kumar
- Shatrughan Sinha as Rakesh
- Raakhee Gulzar as Sheetal
- Parveen Babi as Sunita
- Bindiya Goswami as Renu
- Johnny Walker as Chacha
- Kulbhushan Kharbanda as Shakaal
- Mazhar Khan as Abdul (Vijay and Ravi's informer)
- Sudhir as Ranjeet (Shiv's informer)
- Padmini Kapila as Roma (Rakesh's wife)
- Yunus Parvez as Hotel Manager Saxena
- Viju Khote as Police Inspector Damodar Awasthi
- Helen in "Yamma Yamma"
- Bindu as Maharani in "Pyaar Karne Wale"

=== Shakaal's henchmen ===
- Mac Mohan as Jagmohan
- Sudhir Pandey as Tiwari
- Dalip Tahil as Kumar
- Sujit Kumar as Raghunath
- Manik Irani as Shyam
- Goga Kapoor as Kirti
- Sharat Saxena as Prakash

== Production ==
Logistical issues relating to other projects in which the cast was involved meant that Shaan took three years to make. While Sholay drew its inspiration from the American Western and Spaghetti Western films, Shaan took its lead from the James Bond films with fancy sets and beautiful costumes. Shakaal, the bald villain (originally to be played by Sanjeev Kumar) played by Kulbhushan Kharbanda, was based on the James Bond villain, Blofeld.

A large golden eagle is prominent in Shakaal's island lair and in the Bollywood obligatory final song-and-dance. The eagle is reminiscent of the golden lamb in Cecile DeMille's Ten Commandments; construction on the golden eagle required outside experts to be flown in and cost (in Rupees) the equivalent of the chariot scene in Ben-Hur.

Sippy wanted to repeat the cast of Sholay (1975) for this film, but due to date issues, Sunil Dutt played the role initially offered to Sanjeev Kumar, Bindiya Goswami played the role initially offered to Hema Malini, and Shashi Kapoor played the role initially offered to Dharmendra and Shatrughan Sinha played the role which was offered to Vinod Khanna.The film was set and partially filmed on the island of Steep Holm.

Parveen Babi suffered a panic attack, after she completed shooting for the song "Pyar Karne Wale". Just after that song, there is a scene in the film, where Babi's character is inside the car and Amitabh Bachchan's character gets in the car. This scene was shot when Babi returned from the US and she recommenced work by shooting this scene.

== Soundtrack ==
The music was composed by R. D. Burman and the lyrics were penned by Anand Bakshi.

Vocals were supplied by Kishore Kumar, RD Burman (both for Bachchan), Mohammed Rafi (for Kapoor and Khan), Asha Bhosle (for Babi), Usha Mangeshkar (for Goswami), and Usha Uthup.

No.	Title	Singer(s)	Length
1.	"Yamma Yamma"	Mohammed Rafi, R. D. Burman
2.	"Shaan Se (Pyaar Karne Waale)"	Asha Bhosle, Parveen Babi
3.	"Jaanu Meri Jaan"	Mohammed Rafi, Kishore Kumar, Asha Bhosle, Usha Mangeshkar
4.	"Doston Se Pyar Kiya"	Usha Uthup
5.	"Dariya Mein Jahaz Chale"	Kishore Kumar, Asha Bhosle, Usha Mangeshkar
6.	"Mittua"	Lata Mangeshkar, Asha Bhosle
7.	"Naam Abdul Hai Mera"	Mohammed Rafi

Mohammad Rafi recorded a rehearsal for the song "Yamma Yamma", with a final recording scheduled for later. Due to Rafi's untimely death before the final recording, Burman used the rehearsal. This is the only song where Rafi and Burman sing a duet together.

== Box office ==
The film grossed ₹12.5 crore during its lifetime theatrical run. Adjusted for inflation, the film has grossed ₹271 crore ($33 million) as of 2023.

== Awards ==
28th Filmfare Awards:

Won

- Best Cinematography – S. M. Anwar

Nominated

- Best Music Director – R. D. Burman
