= Salim Khan =

Indian actor and screenwriter (born 1935)

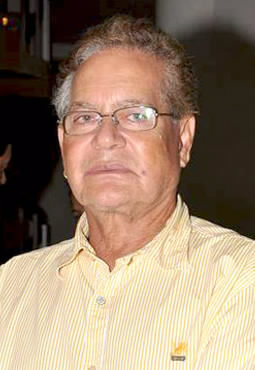
- Khan in August 2013
- Pronunciation: [sɐliːm xɑːn]
- Born: 24 November 1935 (age 90); Indore, Indore State, British India
- Occupations: Actor; film producer; screenwriter
- Years active: 1959–present
- Spouses: Salma Khan (Sushila Charak) (m. 1964); Helen (m. 1981)
- Children: 5 (including Salman Khan, Arbaaz Khan, Alvira Khan Agnihotri, Sohail Khan)
- Relatives: See Khan family
- Awards: 6 Filmfare Awards

Salim Khan (Note: Hindustani pronunciation: [sɐliːm xɑːn].) (Hindustani pronunciation: [sɐliːm xɑːn]; born 24 November 1935) is an Indian screenwriter, actor, and film producer. He wrote the screenplays, stories and scripts for numerous Hindi films. He is best known as one half of the prolific screenwriting duo Salim–Javed, along with Javed Akhtar. The pair were among the first Indian screenwriters to achieve star status in Hindi cinema, and remain among the most influential screenwriters in Indian film history. Within the partnership, Salim Khan primarily developed stories and characters, while Akhtar focused on dialogues and screenplay writing.

Together, Salim–Javed revolutionised Indian cinema in the 1970s, transforming the Bollywood narrative formula and pioneering the blockbuster format. They popularised the masala film and the Dacoit Western genre, and were instrumental in creating the "angry young man" archetype that defined Amitabh Bachchan’s career. Their major successes include Seeta Aur Geeta (1972), Zanjeer (1973), Deewaar (1975), Sholay (1975), Trishul (1978), Kranti (1981), and the Don franchise. Sholay became the highest-grossing Indian film of its time and is frequently listed among the greatest Indian films ever made.

Salim Khan is also known as the patriarch of the Salim Khan family, and the father of three Bollywood actors — Salman Khan, Sohail Khan, and Arbaaz Khan — and film producer Alvira Khan Agnihotri. He is married to Sushila Charak (also known as Salma Khan), and to actress Helen.

Over his career, Salim Khan has won six Filmfare Awards as part of Salim–Javed's partnership. In 2014, Salim Khan was offered the Padma Shri by the Government of India for his contributions to Hindi cinema, but he declined the award, stating that he deserved a higher honour.

In 2024, Amazon Prime Video released a three-part documentary series about the Salim–Javed screenwriting duo titled Angry Young Men. The series explores their creative partnership, their influence on the evolution of Indian cinema, and their personal journeys beyond the partnership.

== Early life ==
Salim Khan was born in the Indore in Indore State a princely state in British India (modern day Madhya Pradesh, India) into an affluent family. He pursued his studies at Holkar Science College, Indore.

According to Khan his grandparents are Alakozai Pashtuns who migrated from Afghanistan to India in the mid-1800s and served in the cavalry of the British Indian Army, however, author Jasim Khan, in his biography of Salman Khan, has mentioned that the ancestors belonged to the Akazai sub-tribe of the Yusufzai Pashtuns from Malakand in the Swat Valley of North-West Frontier Province, British India (present-day Khyber Pakhtunkhwa, Pakistan). Khan's family tended to look for employment in government service, and eventually settled in Indore.

Salim Khan was the youngest child of his parents, both of whom died by the time he was 14 years old. His father, Abdul Rashid Khan, had joined the Indian Imperial Police and had risen to the rank of DIG-Indore, which was the highest police rank open to an Indian in British India. Salim's mother, whose name was Siddiqa Bano Khan, died when he was only nine years old. She had suffered from tuberculosis for four years before her death, and therefore it was forbidden for the younger children come close to her or hug her; Salim therefore had little contact with his mother even before her early death. His father also died in January 1950, when Salim was only fourteen years old. Two months later, in March 1950, Salim (who attended St. Raphaels' School in Indore) appeared for his matriculation examination. He did moderately well, and enrolled in Holkar College, Indore, and completed his BA. His elder brothers supported him with funds drawn from the family's substantial wealth, to the extent that he was given a car of his own while he was a college student. He excelled in sports, especially cricket, and it was for being a star cricketer that he was allowed by the college to enroll for a master's degree at the end of his bachelors. He was also a trained pilot. During these years, he also became enamored of films, and received encouragement from classmates, who told him that with his exceptional good looks, he should try to become a film star.

== Career ==
=== Acting phase (1960–1969) ===
He worked as a supporting role in film Baraat directed by K. Amarnath. He would be paid Rs.1000/-(₹88,356.56 rupees in 2023) as a signing amount and a monthly salary of Rs.400/-(₹35,342.64 rupees in 2023) for the period of shooting. Salim accepted and moved to Mumbai, living in a rented apartment in Mahim. His brother owned transport trucks in Indore and helped him with money. While Baraat was duly made and released in 1960, it did not do too well.

Working under the name Prince Salim, he got into the usual 'struggle' situation of wannabe actors, working in minor roles, being typecast as a good-looking supporting actor, and gradually descending into B-grade films. Over the next decade, he acted in what he calls "indifferent roles," playing minor characters in about two dozen films, but so minor were his appearances that his name does not appear on the credits of several of these films; his credits amount to a total of 14 films until 1970, and one final appearance in 1977. These included Teesri Manzil (1966), Sarhaadi Lootera (1966) and Diwaana (1967). His most substantial role, for which he did receive some notice, was in Teesri Manzil, where his role as the hero's friend was a meaty one, and his entry scene got a very good build-up.

=== Screenwriting transition (1969–1971) ===
After working in 25 films, he eventually understood that he "was not cut out to be an actor because I lacked the art of projection. But by then it was too late — how could I have gone back to Indore?" In the late 1960s, Salim Khan decided to start shifting his focus away from acting and towards writing scripts, and continued to use the name Prince Salim. One of his more notable film scripts was Do Bhai (1969). He also began working with Abrar Alvi as a writing assistant.

=== Salim-Javed phase (1971–1982) ===
Salim met Javed Akhtar for first time during the making of the film Sarhadi Lootera, which was fated to be Salim's last acting appearance. Javed, who served as a clapper boy when shooting began, was later made the dialogue writer for the film by director S.M. Sagar. The friendship with Javed began while both were working in this film, and developed further because their bosses were neighbours to each other. Salim Khan got a job assisting writer/director Abrar Alvi in finalising screenplays and dialogues, while Javed Akhtar began assisting Kaifi Azmi in a similar capacity, with focus on honing poetry. Abrar Alvi and Kaifi Azmi were neighbours, and therefore Salim Khan and Javed Akhtar used to see a lot of each other. The duo hit it off well and formed a script-writing team that came to be known as Salim–Javed. Salim used to form stories and plots, whereas Javed used to develop the dialogues and occasionally the song-lyrics for those films. They used to brainstorm and come to conclusions regarding the final draft of the film.

Rajesh Khanna is credited with giving them their first break as script writers. Javed Akhtar accepted in an interview that "One day, he (Rajesh Khanna) went to Salimsaab and said that Mr. Devar had given him a huge signing amount with which he could complete the payment for his bungalow Aashirwad. But the film was a remake [of Deiva Cheyal] and the script of the original was far from being satisfactory. He told us that if we could set right the script, he would make sure we got both money and credit." This was their first break as script-writers, and the film, Haathi Mere Saathi, went on to become a big hit. The Salim–Javed duo were hired by G. P. Sippy to work for Sippy Films as resident screenwriters. They produced the screenplays for several successful films like Andaz, Seeta Aur Geeta, Sholay and Don. Their first big success was the script for Andaz, followed by Adhikar (1971), Haathi Mere Saathi and Seeta Aur Geeta (1972). They also had hits in Yaadon Ki Baaraat (1973), Zanjeer (1973), Haath Ki Safai (1974), Deewaar (1975), Sholay (1975), Chacha Bhatija (1977), Don (1978), Trishul (1978), Dostana (1980), Kranti (1981), Zamana (1985) and Mr. India (1987). They have worked together in 24 films including two Kannada films – Premada Kanike and Raja Nanna Raja. Of the 24 films they wrote 20 were hits. The scripts they wrote but which were not successful at box office include Aakhri Dao (1975), Immaan Dharam (1977), Kaala Patthar (1979) and Shaan (1980). Though they split in 1982, due to ego issues, some of the scripts they wrote were made into films later like Zamana and Mr. India which became successful. Salim-Javed, many a time described as "the most successful scriptwriters of all-time", are also noted to be the first scriptwriters in Indian cinema to achieve star status.

The Salim-Javed duo were also notable for causing several changes to be made in the way scriptwriters were perceived and treated within the Hindi film industry. Until the 1970s, there was no concept of having the same people write screenplay, story and dialogue. Nor were writers usually named in the credits of the film; junior, struggling writers in particular were simply paid and sent away. Salim-Javed changed this situation. Since their scripts were so successful, they had the power to make demands on film-makers. They not only insisted on being paid much more than what had been the norm until then, but also ensured that their name was on the film credits, and also that they were involved at many stages of the process, including screenplay and dialogues.

While credited under the name "Salim-Javed", the screenplay of Zanjeer was almost entirely written by Salim Khan alone, before bringing Javed Akhtar on board and crediting it under the name "Salim-Javed". Salim Khan was also instrumental in launching the career of Amitabh Bachchan, who was a struggling actor before being discovered by Salim-Javed, who were impressed by his acting abilities and insisted on casting him in the lead roles for their films. Salim Khan was also personally responsible for introducing Bachchan to directors such as Prakash Mehra and Manmohan Desai.

=== Later years (1983–2003) ===
Salim Khan, after splitting, from Javed wrote script and dialogues for successful movies like Angaaray (1986), Naam (1986), Kabzaa (1988) and Jurm (1990). For Angaaray, Rajesh Khanna asked director Rajesh Sethi to go to Salim Khan and rework on the script he had.

Salim was not very active in films after 1996, after the failure of some of the films he wrote, which included Akayla (1991), Toofan (1989) and others. He wrote scripts for thirteen films from 1983 to 1996, after his split with Javed Akhthar. These included Majdhaar and the hit film Patthar Ke Phool which starred his son Salman Khan. Other notable hits were the scripts for Pyaar Kiya To Darna Kya and Auzaar, both of which were produced by his youngest son Sohail Khan and starred Salman.

His last unofficial collaboration with Javed Akhtar was on the film Baghban (2003). Amitabh Bachchan requested that Javed Akhtar write his final speech. Earlier in the film, Salman Khan asked his father, Salim Khan, to write his speech. However, neither Salim Khan nor Javed Akhtar received credit.

== Personal life ==
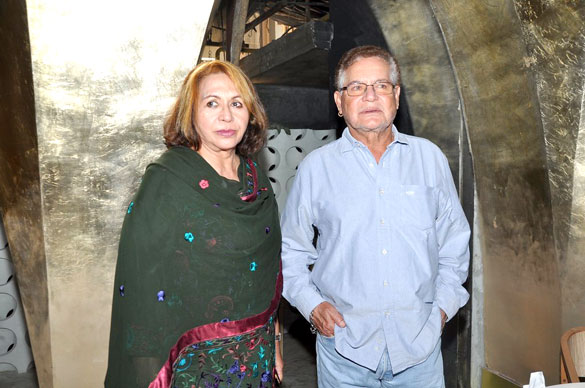
Khan with his second wife Helen in 2013

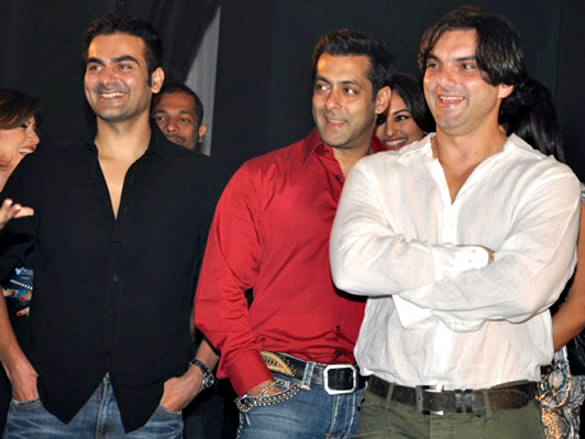
Khan's sons – Arbaaz Khan, Salman Khan and Sohail Khan at an event in 2013

Khan has been married twice. His first marriage was to Salma Khan (born Sushila Charak), a Hindu, on 18 November 1964. Both of Charak's parents were Hindu: while her father, Baldev Singh Charak, hailed from Jammu, her mother was Maharashtrian. Khan and Salma have four children together; three sons, Salman, Arbaaz and Sohail, and one daughter, Alvira. In 1981, Khan married actress Helen Richardson, a Christian whose father was Anglo-Indian and mother was Burmese. Some years later, they adopted a girl named Arpita, daughter of a homeless woman who died on a Mumbai footpath.

Khan's eldest son, Salman, is one of the most commercially successful actors of Indian cinema. His other two sons, Arbaaz and Sohail, are also actors and film producers. His elder daughter Alvira is married to former actor and film-maker Atul Agnihotri, while his younger daughter Arpita is married to Aayush Sharma, grandson of Sukh Ram, a former Minister of Himachal Pradesh and long-time member of the Indian National Congress. His son, Salman Khan, describes him as a big fan of Kazi Nazrul Islam and is said to have read most of his poems.

== Filmography ==
=== Screenwriter (Salim-Javed) ===
Year	Film	Language	Director	Cast
1971	Andaz	Hindi	Ramesh Sippy	Shammi Kapoor, Hema Malini, Rajesh Khanna, Simi Garewal
1971	Adhikar	Hindi	S. M. Sagar	Ashok Kumar, Nanda, Deb Mukherjee
1971	Haathi Mere Saathi	Hindi	M. A. Thirumugam	Rajesh Khanna, Tanuja
1972	Seeta Aur Geeta	Hindi	Ramesh Sippy	Dharmendra, Hema Malini, Sanjeev Kumar
1973	Yaadon Ki Baaraat	Hindi	Nasir Hussain	Dharmendra, Zeenat Aman, Vijay Arora, Tariq Khan
1973	Zanjeer	Hindi	Prakash Mehra	Amitabh Bachchan, Jaya Bachchan, Pran
1974	Majboor	Hindi	Ravi Tandon	Amitabh Bachchan, Parveen Babi, Pran
1974	Haath Ki Safai	Hindi	Prakash Mehra	Randhir Kapoor, Vinod Khanna, Hema Malini, Simi Garewal, Ranjeet
1975	Deewaar	Hindi	Yash Chopra	Amitabh Bachchan, Shashi Kapoor, Parveen Babi, Neetu Singh
1975	Aakhri Dao	Hindi	A. Salaam	Jeetendra, Saira Banu, Danny Denzongpa
1975	Sholay	Hindi	Ramesh Sippy	Dharmendra, Amitabh Bachchan, Sanjeev Kumar, Hema Malini, Jaya Bhaduri
1976	Premada Kanike	Kannada	V. Somashekhar	Rajkumar, Aarathi
1976	Raja Nanna Raja	Kannada	A. V. Seshagiri Rao	Rajkumar, Aarathi
1977	Immaan Dharam	Hindi	Desh Mukherjee	Amitabh Bachchan, Shashi Kapoor, Sanjeev Kumar, Rekha
1977	Chacha Bhatija	Hindi	Manmohan Desai	Dharmendra, Randhir Kapoor, Hema Malini
1978	Trishul	Hindi	Yash Chopra	Amitabh Bachchan, Sanjeev Kumar, Shashi Kapoor, Hema Malini
1978	Don	Hindi	Chandra Barot	Amitabh Bachchan, Helen, Zeenat Aman
1979	Kaala Patthar	Hindi	Yash Chopra	Amitabh Bachchan, Shashi Kapoor, Shatrughan Sinha
1980	Dostana	Hindi	Raj Khosla	Amitabh Bachchan, Shatrughan Sinha, Zeenat Aman, Helen
1980	Shaan	Hindi	Ramesh Sippy	Amitabh Bachchan, Sunil Dutt, Shatrughan Sinha, Shashi Kapoor, Rakhee Gulzar, Parveen Babi
1981	Kranti	Hindi	Manoj Kumar	Dilip Kumar, Shashi Kapoor, Shatrughan Sinha, Hema Malini, Parveen Babi
1982	Shakti	Hindi	Ramesh Sippy	Dilip Kumar, Amitabh Bachchan, Raakhee, Anil Kapoor
1985	Zamana	Hindi	Ramesh Talwar	Rajesh Khanna, Rishi Kapoor, Poonam Dhillon, Ranjeeta Kaur
1987	Mr. India	Hindi	Shekhar Kapur	Anil Kapoor, Sridevi, Amrish Puri Naam (1986 film)

=== Actor ===
- Baraat (1960)
- Police Detective (1960)
- Ramu Dada (1961)
- Professor (1962)
- Kabli Khan (1963)
- Bachpan (1963)
- Darasingh: Ironman (1964)
- Aandhi Aur Toofan (1964)
- Raaka (1965)
- Sarhadi Lutera (1966)
- Teesri Manzil (1966)
- Sarhaadi Lootera (1966)
- Diwana (1967)
- Chhaila Babu (1967)
- Lahu Pukarega (1968)
- Wafadar (1977)
- Mahabharat(1965)

== Awards ==
=== Filmfare Awards ===
Year	Category	Outcome	Film	Director	Notes
1974	Best Screenplay	Won	Zanjeer (1973)	Prakash Mehra	
1974	Best Story	Won	Zanjeer (1973)	Prakash Mehra	
1976	Best Dialogue	Won	Deewaar (1975)	Yash Chopra	
1976	Best Screenplay	Won	Deewaar (1975)	Yash Chopra	
1976	Best Story	Won	Deewaar (1975)	Yash Chopra	
1983	Best Screenplay	Won	Shakti (1982)	Ramesh Sippy	

=== British Film Institute ===
Sholay (1975) was ranked first in the British Film Institute's 2002 poll of "Top 10 Indian Films" of all time.

=== Honorary awards ===
- Lifetime Achievement Honour at Apsara Film & Television Producers Guild Award in January 2014.
- In 2015, he declined Padma Shri, stating that the honour did not match his contribution to Hindi Cinema, and that he believed he deserved a higher civilian award, such as Padma Bhushan.
