= Angry Young Men (miniseries) =

- Promotional poster
- Genre: Documentary
- Directed by: Namrata Rao
- Creative director: Zoya Akhtar (concept)
- Starring: Salim Khan; Javed Akhtar; Amitabh Bachchan
- Country of origin: India
- Original language: Hindi
- No. of seasons: 1
- No. of episodes: 3

Production
- Executive producers: Salma Khan; Salman Khan; Arbaaz Khan; Sohail Khan; Farhan Akhtar; Zoya Akhtar; Reema Kagti; Ritesh Sidhwani
- Producers: Salman Khan Films; Excel Entertainment; Tiger Baby Films
- Editor: Geeta Singh

Original release
- Network: Amazon Prime Video
- Release: 20 August 2024

Angry Young Men is a 2024 Indian documentary miniseries about the screenwriting duo Salim Khan and Javed Akhtar, popularly known as Salim–Javed. Directed by Namrata Rao in her feature debut, the three-part series premiered on Amazon Prime Video on 20 August 2024. It focuses on the professional journey of Salim–Javed and their influence on Hindi cinema, especially through the creation of the "angry young man" character type made popular by actor Amitabh Bachchan in the 1970s. The series uses a mix of archival footage and new interviews with actors, filmmakers, and family members.

== Series summary ==
The series is divided into three episodes. The first episode, "Origins and Rise," begins with the early lives of Salim Khan and Javed Akhtar when they moved to Mumbai, and struggled to establish themselves in the film industry. Salim Khan came from Indore with an interest in acting, while Javed Akhtar came from Bhopal with the aim of becoming a director, beginning as an assistant. The episode explores Salim’s roles as an actor in films such as Baraat (1960), Ramu Dada (1961), Professor (1962), and Bachpan (1963). He first met Javed on the set of Sarhadi Lutera (1966), with Salim as one of the stars and Javed as an assistant. After becoming friends, they worked as a ghostwriting team, developing the screenplay for Adhikar (1971). This led to positions with director Ramesh Sippy's company in the writing department. The episode then explores the birth of Salim-Javed as a writing team for films such as Andaz, Haathi Mere Saathi, Seeta Aur Geeta (1972), and Yaadon Ki Baaraat (1973). The episode ends with the development of the "angry young man" character (drawn from the difficulties that they experienced in their earlier years). It is embodied as "Vijay" by the actor Amitabh Bachchan in Zanjeer (1973).

The second episode, Golden Period highlights their rise, as well as that of "the angry young man" films (with Bachchan returning, often as “Vijay”). It highlights the two films that dominated 1975; Deewaar and Sholay, both of which are now considered two of the greatest films in Hindi cinema. These films reflected the angst and mood of India in the 1970s, with regard to corruption, inequality, and public frustration. Deewar and Sholay in particular were released in the same year as The Emergency in 1975. The episode also examines the popularity of the films Trishul (1978) and Shakti (1982).

The third and final episode, Dissolution focuses on the films of the late 1970s and early 1980s, and the decline of their partnership. It begins with their first failure, Immaan Dharam (1977), and then explores the films that followed. Their next film Don (1978) was a huge success and so was Trishul (1978) and Kaala Patthar (1979). It concludes with an examination of Dostana (1980) and Shaan (1980). The episode ends with the dissolution of the partnership, with family members and colleagues speaking openly about the reasons behind their split.

The series also looks at how Salim–Javed changed the status of screenwriters in the Hindi film industry, as they were among the first to demand credit and higher pay, which led to better recognition for writers.

== List of Salim–Javed films featured in the series ==
=== Episode 1: Origins and Rise ===
Amitabh Bachchan's rise as the 'Angry Young Man'

Year	Film	Cast	Director/Notes
1971	Andaz	Shammi Kapoor	Dir. Ramesh Sippy; Debut of Salim-Javed
1971	Andaz	Hema Malini	Dir. Ramesh Sippy; Debut of Salim-Javed
1971	Andaz	Rajesh Khanna	Dir. Ramesh Sippy; Debut of Salim-Javed
1971	Haathi Mere Saathi	Rajesh Khanna	Dir. M. A. Thirumugam
1971	Haathi Mere Saathi	Tanuja	Dir. M. A. Thirumugam
1972	Seeta Aur Geeta	Dharmendra	Dir. Ramesh Sippy
1972	Seeta Aur Geeta	Sanjeev Kumar	Dir. Ramesh Sippy
1972	Seeta Aur Geeta	Hema Malini	Dir. Ramesh Sippy
1972	Seeta Aur Geeta	Honey Irani	Dir. Ramesh Sippy
1972	Seeta Aur Geeta	Manorama	Dir. Ramesh Sippy
1973	Yaadon Ki Baaraat	Dharmendra	Dir. Nasir Hussain
1973	Yaadon Ki Baaraat	Zeenat Aman	Dir. Nasir Hussain
1973	Yaadon Ki Baaraat	Neetu Singh	Dir. Nasir Hussain
1973	Zanjeer	Amitabh Bachchan	Dir. Prakash Mehra; Introduces the "angry young man," Vijay (embodied by Amitabh Bachchan); first collaboration between Salim-Javed and Bachchan.
1973	Zanjeer	Jaya Bhaduri	Dir. Prakash Mehra; Introduces the "angry young man," Vijay (embodied by Amitabh Bachchan); first collaboration between Salim-Javed and Bachchan.
1973	Zanjeer	Pran	Dir. Prakash Mehra; Introduces the "angry young man," Vijay (embodied by Amitabh Bachchan); first collaboration between Salim-Javed and Bachchan.

=== Episode 2: Golden Period ===
Year	Film	Cast	Director/Notes
1975	Deewaar	Amitabh Bachchan	Dir. Yash Chopra; Considered a "landmark" in Hindi Cinema, developing the "angry young man" character "Vijay" (Amitabh Bachchan) See also: The Romantics (TV series)
1975	Deewaar	Shashi Kapoor	Dir. Yash Chopra; Considered a "landmark" in Hindi Cinema, developing the "angry young man" character "Vijay" (Amitabh Bachchan) See also: The Romantics (TV series)
1975	Deewaar	Neetu Singh	Dir. Yash Chopra; Considered a "landmark" in Hindi Cinema, developing the "angry young man" character "Vijay" (Amitabh Bachchan) See also: The Romantics (TV series)
1975	Deewaar	Parveen Babi	Dir. Yash Chopra; Considered a "landmark" in Hindi Cinema, developing the "angry young man" character "Vijay" (Amitabh Bachchan) See also: The Romantics (TV series)
1975	Deewaar	Nirupa Roy	Dir. Yash Chopra; Considered a "landmark" in Hindi Cinema, developing the "angry young man" character "Vijay" (Amitabh Bachchan) See also: The Romantics (TV series)
1975	Sholay	Dharmendra	Dir. Ramesh Sippy; Considered one of the greatest films of Hindi cinema, developing the "angry young man" character "Jai" (Amitabh Bachchan)
1975	Sholay	Amitabh Bachchan	Dir. Ramesh Sippy; Considered one of the greatest films of Hindi cinema, developing the "angry young man" character "Jai" (Amitabh Bachchan)
1975	Sholay	Hema Malini	Dir. Ramesh Sippy; Considered one of the greatest films of Hindi cinema, developing the "angry young man" character "Jai" (Amitabh Bachchan)
1975	Sholay	Jaya Bhaduri	Dir. Ramesh Sippy; Considered one of the greatest films of Hindi cinema, developing the "angry young man" character "Jai" (Amitabh Bachchan)
1975	Sholay	Sanjeev Kumar	Dir. Ramesh Sippy; Considered one of the greatest films of Hindi cinema, developing the "angry young man" character "Jai" (Amitabh Bachchan)
1975	Sholay	Helen	Dir. Ramesh Sippy; Considered one of the greatest films of Hindi cinema, developing the "angry young man" character "Jai" (Amitabh Bachchan)
1975	Sholay	Amjad Khan	Dir. Ramesh Sippy; Considered one of the greatest films of Hindi cinema, developing the "angry young man" character "Jai" (Amitabh Bachchan)
1978	Trishul	Shashi Kapoor	Dir. Yash Chopra; Continues with "the angry young man" character "Vijay" (Amitabh Bachchan)
1978	Trishul	Amitabh Bachchan	Dir. Yash Chopra; Continues with "the angry young man" character "Vijay" (Amitabh Bachchan)
1978	Trishul	Hema Malini	Dir. Yash Chopra; Continues with "the angry young man" character "Vijay" (Amitabh Bachchan)
1978	Trishul	Raakhee	Dir. Yash Chopra; Continues with "the angry young man" character "Vijay" (Amitabh Bachchan)
1982	Shakti	Amitabh Bachchan	Dir. Ramesh Sippy; Continues with "the angry young man" character "Vijay" (Amitabh Bachchan)
1982	Shakti	Dilip Kumar	Dir. Ramesh Sippy; Continues with "the angry young man" character "Vijay" (Amitabh Bachchan)

=== Episode 3: Dissolution ===
Year	Film	Cast	Director/Notes
1977	Immaan Dharam	Shashi Kapoor	Dir. Desh Muckherjee
1977	Immaan Dharam	Amitabh Bachchan	Dir. Desh Muckherjee
1977	Immaan Dharam	Rekha	Dir. Desh Muckherjee
1977	Immaan Dharam	Aparna Sen	Dir. Desh Muckherjee
1977	Immaan Dharam	Helen	Dir. Desh Muckherjee
1977	Immaan Dharam	Prem Chopra	Dir. Desh Muckherjee
1978	Don	Amitabh Bachchan	Dir. Chandra Barot; Continues with "the angry young man" character "Don" and "Vijay" (Amitabh Bachchan)
1978	Don	Zeenat Aman	Dir. Chandra Barot; Continues with "the angry young man" character "Don" and "Vijay" (Amitabh Bachchan)
1978	Don	Helen	Dir. Chandra Barot; Continues with "the angry young man" character "Don" and "Vijay" (Amitabh Bachchan)
1978	Don	Pran	Dir. Chandra Barot; Continues with "the angry young man" character "Don" and "Vijay" (Amitabh Bachchan)
1978	Don	Iftekhar	Dir. Chandra Barot; Continues with "the angry young man" character "Don" and "Vijay" (Amitabh Bachchan)
1978	Don	Om Shivpuri	Dir. Chandra Barot; Continues with "the angry young man" character "Don" and "Vijay" (Amitabh Bachchan)
1979	Kaala Patthar	Amitabh Bachchan	Dir. Yash Chopra; Continues with the "angry young man" character Vijay (embodied by Amitabh Bachchan)
1979	Kaala Patthar	Shashi Kapoor	Dir. Yash Chopra; Continues with the "angry young man" character Vijay (embodied by Amitabh Bachchan)
1979	Kaala Patthar	Parveen Babi	Dir. Yash Chopra; Continues with the "angry young man" character Vijay (embodied by Amitabh Bachchan)
1979	Kaala Patthar	Neetu Singh	Dir. Yash Chopra; Continues with the "angry young man" character Vijay (embodied by Amitabh Bachchan)
1980	Dostana	Amitabh Bachchan	Dir. Raj Khosla; Continues with the "angry young man" character Vijay (embodied by Amitabh Bachchan)
1980	Dostana	Zeenat Aman	Dir. Raj Khosla; Continues with the "angry young man" character Vijay (embodied by Amitabh Bachchan)
1980	Dostana	Helen	Dir. Raj Khosla; Continues with the "angry young man" character Vijay (embodied by Amitabh Bachchan)
1980	Dostana	Pran	Dir. Raj Khosla; Continues with the "angry young man" character Vijay (embodied by Amitabh Bachchan)
1980	Shaan	Amitabh Bachchan	Dir. Ramesh Sippy; Continues with the "angry young man" character Vijay (embodied by Amitabh Bachchan)
1980	Shaan	Shashi Kapoor	Dir. Ramesh Sippy; Continues with the "angry young man" character Vijay (embodied by Amitabh Bachchan)
1980	Shaan	Sunil Dutt	Dir. Ramesh Sippy; Continues with the "angry young man" character Vijay (embodied by Amitabh Bachchan)
1980	Shaan	Helen	Dir. Ramesh Sippy; Continues with the "angry young man" character Vijay (embodied by Amitabh Bachchan)

== Featured interviews ==
=== Main ===
- Salim Khan
- Javed Akhtar
- Amitabh Bachchan

=== Actors ===
- Farhan Akhtar
- Shabana Azmi
- Abhishek Bachchan
- Jaya Bachchan
- Dharmendra Deol
- Helen
- Kareena Kapoor
- Arbaaz Khan
- Aamir Khan
- Salman Khan
- Shah Rukh Khan
- Hema Malini
- Hrithik Roshan
- Saif Ali Khan
- Ranveer Singh
- Shatrughan Sinha
- Yash

=== Filmmakers ===
- Zoya Akhtar
- Shyam Benegal
- Mahesh Bhatt
- Yash Chopra
- Rajkumar Hirani
- Karan Johar
- Reema Kagti
- Farah Khan
- Ramesh Sippy

=== Writers, musicians, and critics ===
- Shweta Bachchan Nanda
- Anupama Chopra
- Honey Irani
- Abhijat Joshi
- A.R. Rahman
- Anjum Rajabali
- Jaideep Sahni

== Production ==
The series was directed by Namrata Rao, a National Award-winning film editor. Although the idea for the documentary came from Zoya Akhtar, she chose not to direct it herself, saying it would be too personal. Rao aimed to maintain objectivity while telling the story of Salim–Javed. Filming took place over three years, including during the COVID-19 pandemic. The team collected more than 800 hours of footage, which was later edited into three episodes with help from editor Geeta Singh. The series was produced by Salman Khan Films (SKF), Excel Media & Entertainment (owned by Farhan Akhtar), and Tiger Baby (founded by Zoya Akhtar and Reema Kagti). Aside from Salma Khan and Salman Khan, brothers Arbaaz Khan and Sohail Khan also served as executive producers for SKF, while Farhan Akhtar, Zoya Akhtar, Reema Kagti, and Ritesh Sidhwani served as executive producers for Excel Media & Entertainment and Tiger Baby.

Rao deliberately chose to interview Salim Khan and Javed Akhtar separately in order to allow each writer to focus on his personal story. The series also includes views from women in their families and industry colleagues, touching upon how their films portrayed female characters.

== Reception ==
Filmfare gave the series 5 out of 5 stars and described it as a "must-watch." NDTV says that it “does a perfect job of spotlighting the cornerstones of the Salim Khan-Javed Akhtar partnership that, in the 1970s, yielded a few of the greatest Hindi megahits” while also not being a hagiography. India Today (4/5) says that the documentary is as "engaging as any full-blown masala entertainer.” The Times of India (4/5) states that the film "is as much a reality check on the downside of success as much as it’s a fitting tribute to the glorious journey of screenwriting duo Salim Khan and Javed Akhtar."

The Wire argues that it is “pleasurable, comforting and fun. But it’s also limited in its perspective, and unwilling to critically examine its subjects beyond a point.” Livemint says that "despite all the interviews they gave and books written on their films, there was still a lot we didn’t know about Salim-Javed. After 135 minutes, we still don’t." Sukanya Verma of Rediff.com suggests that the documentary "lacks that IT factor, a sense of exclusivity befitting their legend."

== See also ==
- Angry young man (India)
- The Romantics (documentary) (2023)
- The Roshans (2025)
