= Filmfare Award for Best Screenplay =

Annual award for Hindi films

Filmfare Award for Screenplay
- Awarded for: Best Performance by a Screenplay Writer
- Country: India
- Presented by: Filmfare
- First award: Nabendu Ghosh, Majhli Didi (1969)
- Currently held by: Sneha Desai; Laapataa Ladies (2025)
- Website: Filmfare Awards

The Filmfare Best Screenplay Award is given by the Filmfare magazine as part of its annual Filmfare Awards for Hindi films.

== Multiple Winners ==
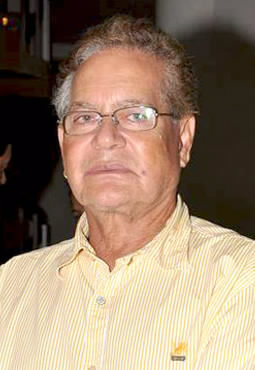
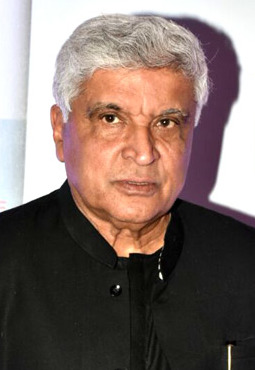
Salim Khan (l) and Javed Akhtar (r), together as Salim–Javed, hold the record of maximum wins jointly with Basu Chatterjee, Rajkumar Hirani and Vidhu Vinod Chopra.

Wins	Recipient
3	Salim–Javed, Basu Chatterjee, Rajkumar Hirani, Vidhu Vinod Chopra
2	Vijay Tendulkar, Mani Ratnam, Abhijat Joshi

== List of winners ==
=== 1960s ===
- 1969 Nabendu Ghosh – Majhli Didi

=== 1970s ===
- 1970 Hrishikesh Mukherjee – Anokhi Raat
- 1971 Vijay Anand – Johny Mera Naam
- 1972 Basu Chatterjee – Sara Akash
- 1973 Arvind Mukherjee – Amar Prem
- 1974 Salim–Javed – Zanjeer
- 1975 Shama Zaidi, Kaifi Azmi – Garm Hava
- 1976 Salim–Javed – Deewaar
- 1977 Basu Chatterjee – Chhoti Si Baat
- 1978 Lekh Tandon, Vrajendra Kaur, Madhusudan Kalelkar – Dulhan Wahi Jo Piya Man Bhaye
- 1979 Kamleshwar – Pati Patni Aur Woh

=== 1980s ===
- 1980 Girish Karnad, B.V. Karanth – Godhuli
- 1981 Vijay Tendulkar – Aakrosh
- 1982 K. Balachander – Ek Duuje Ke Liye
- 1983 Salim–Javed – Shakti
- 1984 Vijay Tendulkar – Ardh Satya
- 1985 Mrinal Sen – Khandhar
- 1986 Goutam Ghose, Partha Banerjee – Paar
- 1987 Not Awarded
- 1988 Not Awarded
- 1989 Nasir Hussain – Qayamat Se Qayamat Tak

=== 1990s ===
- 1990 Shiv Kumar Subramaniam – Parinda
- 1991 Basu Chatterjee – Kamla Ki Maut
- 1992 Tapan Sinha – Ek Doctor Ki Maut
- 1993 Aziz Mirza, Manoj Lalwani – Raju Ban Gaya Gentleman
- 1994 Robin Bhatt, Javed Siddiqui, Akash Khurana – Baazigar
- 1995 Sooraj R. Barjatya – Hum Aapke Hain Koun..!
- 1996 Aditya Chopra – Dilwale Dulhania Le Jayenge
- 1997 Rajkumar Santoshi – Ghatak: Lethal
- 1998 Subhash Ghai – Pardes
- 1999 Karan Johar – Kuch Kuch Hota Hai

=== 2000s ===
- 2000 John Matthew Matthan – Sarfarosh
- 2001 Honey Irani, Ravi Kapoor – Kaho Naa... Pyaar Hai
- 2002 Farhan Akhtar – Dil Chahta Hai
- 2003 Mani Ratnam – Saathiya
- 2004 Rajkumar Hirani, Vidhu Vinod Chopra, Lajan Joseph – Munna Bhai M.B.B.S.
- 2005 Mani Ratnam – Yuva
- 2006 Nina Arora, Manoj Tyagi – Page 3
- 2007 Jaideep Sahni – Khosla Ka Ghosla
- 2008 Anurag Basu – Life In A... Metro
- 2009 Yogendra Vinayak Joshi, Upendra Sidhaye – Mumbai Meri Jaan

=== 2010s ===
- 2010 Rajkumar Hirani, Vidhu Vinod Chopra, Abhijat Joshi – 3 Idiots
- 2011 Anurag Kashyap, Vikramaditya Motwane – Udaan
- 2012 Akshat Verma – Delhi Belly
- 2013 Sanjay Chauhan and Tigmanshu Dhulia – Paan Singh Tomar
- 2014 Chetan Bhagat, Abhishek Kapoor, Supratik Sen & Pubali Chaudhari – Kai Po Che!
- 2015 Rajkumar Hirani, Abhijat Joshi – PK
- 2016 Juhi Chaturvedi – Piku
- 2017 Shakun Batra, Ayesha Devitre - Kapoor & Sons
- 2018 Shubhashish Bhutiani - Mukti Bhawan
- 2019 Sriram Raghavan, Arijit Biswas, Pooja Ladha Surti, Yogesh Chandekar, Hemanth Rao – Andhadhun
  - Anubhav Sinha – Mulk
  - Bhavani Iyer and Meghna Gulzar – Raazi
  - Nandita Das – Manto
  - Raj and DK – Stree

== 2020s ==
- 2020 Zoya Akhtar, Reema Kagti - Gully Boy
  - Anubhav Sinha, Gaurav Solanki - Article 15
  - Balwinder Singh Janjua - Saand Ki Aankh
  - Jagan Shakti, R Balki, Dharma, Nidhi Singh, Saket Kodiparthi - Mission Mangal
  - Manish Gupta, Ajay Bahl - Section 375
  - Sudip Sharma - Sonchiriya
- 2021 Rohena Gera - Sir
  - Anubhav Sinha, Mrunmayee Lagoo Waikul - Thappad
  - Anurag Basu - Ludo
  - Kapil Sawant, Rajesh Krishnan -Lootcase
  - Prakash Kapadia, Om Raut -Tanhaji
- 2022 Shubendu Bhattacharya and Ritesh Shah – Sardar Udham
  - Aastha Tiku – Sherni
  - Aniruddha Guha – Rashmi Rocket
  - Dibakar Banerjee and Varun Grover – Sandeep Aur Pinky Faraar
  - Kabir Khan, Sanjay Puran Singh Chauhan and Vasan Bala – 83
  - Sandeep Shrivastava – Shershaah
- 2023 Harshavardhan Kulkarni, Akshat Ghildial and Suman Adhikary – Badhaai Do
  - Aakash Kaushik – Bhool Bhulaiyaa 2
  - Jaspal Singh Sandhu And Rajeev Barnwal – Vadh
  - Neeraj Yadav – An Action Hero
  - Sanjay Leela Bhansali and Utkarshini Vashishtha – Gangubai Kathiawadi
  - Vivek Ranjan Agnihotri – The Kashmir Files
- 2024 Vidhu Vinod Chopra – 12th Fail
  - Amit Rai – OMG 2
  - Ishita Moitra, Shashank Khaitan, Sumit Roy – Rocky Aur Rani Kii Prem Kahaani
  - Sandeep Reddy Vanga, Pranay Reddy Vanga, Suresh Bandaru – Animal
  - Shridhar Raghavan – Pathaan
  - Avinash Arun, Omkar Achyut Barve, Arpita Chatterjee – Three of Us
- 2025 Sneha Desai – Laapataa Ladies
  - Aditya Dhar, Aditya Suhas Jambhale, Arjun Dhawan, Monal Thaakar – Article 370
  - Niren Bhatt – Stree 2
  - Nikhil Nagesh Bhat – Kill
  - Kunal Kemmu – Madgaon Express
