= Deewaar =

1975 Indian film by Yash Chopra

- Theatrical release poster
- Directed by: Yash Chopra
- Written by: Salim–Javed
- Produced by: Gulshan Rai
- Starring: Shashi Kapoor; Amitabh Bachchan; Neetu Singh; Nirupa Roy; Parveen Babi; Iftekhar; Madan Puri; Satyen Kappu; Manmohan Krishna
- Cinematography: Kay Gee Koregaonkar
- Edited by: T. R. Mangeshkar; Pran Mehra
- Music by: R. D. Burman
- Production company: Trimurti Films Pvt. Ltd.
- Release date: 24 January 1975
- Running time: 176 minutes
- Country: India
- Language: Hindi
- Box office: ₹75 million

Deewaar (transl. The Wall) is a 1975 Indian Hindi-language action crime film directed by Yash Chopra, from a story by Salim–Javed. The film stars Shashi Kapoor, Amitabh Bachchan, and alongside an ensemble cast of Neetu Singh, Nirupa Roy, Parveen Babi, Iftekhar, Madan Puri, Satyen Kappu and Manmohan Krishna. The music was composed by R. D. Burman, while cinematography and editing were handled by Kay Gee Koregaonkar and T. R. Mangeshkar-Pran Mehra. In the film, two impoverished brothers struggle to survive in the slums of Mumbai and eventually find themselves on opposing sides of the law. The film's title signifies the wall that springs up between the two brothers, drawn apart by fate and circumstances in a time of socio-political turmoil.

Deewaar was released worldwide on 24 January 1975 to critical acclaim and praise for its story, script, music cast performances (especially Bachchan, Kapoor and Roy). The film was commercially successful and is considered a ground-breaking cinematic masterpiece, with India Times ranking Deewaar amongst the Top 25 Must See Bollywood Films. It is also one of three Hindi-language films to be included on the list of 1001 Movies You Must See Before You Die.

It is now considered a cult classic film and had a significant impact not only on Indian cinema but also on Indian society; its anti-establishment themes and Bachchan's anti-hero vigilante character resonated with audiences. Bachchan's character is often regarded as one of the most memorable onscreen character in Indian cinema, the movie cemented his image as the "Angry young man" of Hindi cinema. Forbes India included Bachchan's performance in the film on its list of "25 Greatest Acting Performances of Indian Cinema". The film also cemented the success of Salim–Javed, who went on to write more blockbuster films; their value skyrocketed and they were being paid as well as the leading actors of the time.

The film was later remade in Telugu as Magaadu (1976), in Tamil as Thee (1981), in Malayalam as Nathi Muthal Nathi Vare (1983), and in Cantonese as The Brothers (1979).

Deewaar's influence also extends to world cinema, influencing films from Hong Kong and British cinema.

== Plot ==
Anand Verma resides in a modest home with his wife Sumitra and their two young sons Vijay Verma (Amitabh Bachchan) and Ravi Verma (Shashi Kapoor). He is a principled and well-respected trade union leader, who leads struggling labourers on a strike as they are depending on him to better their lives with concessions from their owner Badri Prasad. However, Prasad retaliates by kidnapping Anand's family and forcing him to sign a contract giving away the labourers' rights, in order to save his family's lives. When the striking labourers learn about Anand's actions, they all curse him and thrash him nearly to death, unaware that Anand was blackmailed to do so. The labourers even persecute Anand's family, and some of them drunkenly capture Vijay and tattoo his left arm with the Hindi words "मेरा बाप चोर है” (English: ("My father is a thief"). Unable to bear the humiliation, Anand escapes from the town and decides to spend his remaining life aimlessly traveling in trains, abandoning his family for whom he had abandoned his principles and ideals. In desperation, Sumitra brings Vijay and Ravi to Mumbai and resorts to low-wage manual labour to raise her sons alone. Their home is on the footpath under a huge bridge that is home to millions of homeless poor people of the city.

As Vijay and Ravi grow up in the slums of Mumbai, Vijay has an acute awareness of his father's humiliation, for he has been victimized for his father's supposed misdeeds, and is reminded of his past by the ever-present tattoo on his arm. He also refuses to enter a temple, stating that he wishes to chart his own destiny and not beg for it from the deities. Vijay Verma starts out as a shoeshiner and later becomes a dockworker in his youth, sacrificing his own education in order to enable Ravi to study. On the other hand, Ravi is a perfect citizen and is unwavering in his commitment to law and righteousness. Although he is unable to obtain gainful employment, Ravi romances Veera, the daughter of DCP Narang, by whom he is sent for police training and soon earns the rank of Sub-Inspector. In the process of fighting for his rights, Vijay refuses to pay the weekly extortion to the henchmen of the shipyard owner Samant, who is also a crime boss. Vijay proceeds to thrash several of Samant's henchmen, causing his mother Sumitra to berate him. Vijay sarcastically asks her whether she expects him "also" to escape like a coward, implying that he criticises his father's actions, causing a perturbed Sumitra to slap Vijay and half-heartedly defend Anand. The news of Vijay’s beating of Samant’s men reaches Samant's rival, Mulk Raj Daavar, who hires Vijay to protect his smuggled gold bullion that has been thrice hijacked by Samant. Vijay sells the information to Samant to help him hijack the gold bullion, takes the money from Samant, then captures the gold bullion from his warehouse and hands it over to Daavar, who rewards Vijay with a huge sum of money, allowing him to purchase a palatial home for his family.

Meanwhile, DCP Narang provides Ravi his first assignment to apprehend and arrest some of the hardcore criminals and smugglers in Mumbai, which also include Daavar and Vijay. Ravi is shocked for having never associated his brother with criminal activities, and must now decide between apprehending Vijay and quitting the police force. Later, Ravi shoots an impoverished boy Chander in the leg non-fatally in an attempt to arrest him for committing theft, only to find out that Chander had stolen only some bread for his family. After admitting Chander to a hospital under police custody, a remorseful Ravi visits his home, offering his family some food and confessing his action, but Chander's enraged mother berates Ravi and accuses him of colluding with the state in protecting those who store goods in warehouses, and hunting down petty thieves trying to feed their starving families. However, Chander's father, who is a retired schoolteacher, forgives Ravi and justifies the shooting by stating that the stealing no matter of a lakh or of a penny is a crime, and that all criminals should be treated equally and it would lead to anarchy if all the poor and needy resort to the same life. After hearing both sides from Chander's parents, Ravi, who was initially reluctant to act against his own brother, is finally motivated to agree to take his case from DCP Narang.

When Ravi investigates that Vijay has acquired wealth overnight by crime, he confronts Vijay and orders him to surrender himself to the police. However, Vijay refuses to do so, citing all the injustice caused to him and his family. Nevertheless, Ravi decides to leave the house purchased by him and go to live in his police quarters. Sumitra too is disgusted with Vijay and chooses to live with Ravi, even refusing to accept Vijay's gift of the high-rise apartment where she had once worked as a manual labourer. Ravi then completes his task assigned by DCP Narang and arrests many henchmen from the gangs of Samant, Davaar and Vijay (including Daavar himself), causing a feud to develop between Vijay and Ravi. Vijay enters into a sexual relationship with Anita, a prostitute whom he meets at a bar. Around the same time, Anand's dead body is discovered inside a train and his funeral is performed by Vijay. Anita advises Vijay to erase the tattoo on his arm through plastic surgery, but Vijay states that doing so cannot erase the words on the tattoo from his heart and soul. Meanwhile, Sumitra falls severely ill and Vijay is also unable to visit her at the hospital due to the police appointed by Ravi to arrest him. A furious Vijay enters the temple for the first time, and confronts the deity for punishing him at the cost of his faithful mother. As a result, Sumitra miraculously recovers from her illness, much to Ravi and Veera's happiness.

Later, Vijay learns that Anita is pregnant with his child and decides to abandon his life in the underworld, so that he can marry Anita, surrender himself to the police and seek forgiveness from Sumitra and Ravi, not wanting their unborn son to be scarred the way he was. He also calls Sumitra and asks her to arrive at the temple to give him blessings. Despite this, things take a drastic turn when Samant and his remaining henchmen arrive and thrash Anita severely in revenge. After an emotional moment, Anita dies in the arms of Vijay, who retaliates by brutally murdering Samant and his remaining henchmen, thus branding himself a criminal forever. Ravi learns about the deaths of Samant and his henchmen, and when the two brothers meet for a final clash at the crime scene, Ravi pleads with Vijay to stop running and surrender himself, and ends up shooting him in the arm and heart fatally. After getting hit by the gunshot, a gravely injured and dying Vijay uses a car to escape from Ravi and crashes it into the wall of the temple, where he reunites with Sumitra and pleads forgiveness. Vijay then dies in Sumitra's arms, leaving her extremely shattered, just as Ravi arrives at the temple and is completely distraught over shooting Vijay. The film ends with a scene of DCP Narang and the police, awarding Ravi Verma, along with Veera and Sumitra for his successful pursuit of justice, though Ravi is still filled with remorse for killing his older brother.

== Cast ==
- Shashi Kapoor as Sub Inspector Ravi Verma, younger son of Anand and Sumitra, Vijay's younger brother
  - Raju Shrestha as Young Ravi Verma
- Amitabh Bachchan as Vijay Verma, elder son of Anand and Sumitra, Ravi's elder brother
  - Alankar Joshi as Young Vijay Verma
- Neetu Singh as Veera Narang
- Nirupa Roy as Sumitra Verma, wife of Anand, mother of Vijay and Ravi
- Parveen Babi as Anita
- Iftekhar as Mulk Raj Daavar
- Madan Puri as Samant
- Satyen Kappu as Anand Verma, Sumitra's Husband, father of Vijay and Ravi
- Manmohan Krishna as DCP Narang, Veera's father.
- A. K. Hangal as a teacher
- Kamal Kapoor as Badri Prasad
- Sudhir as Jaichand, Vijay and Daavar's associate.
- Jagdish Raj as Jaggi
- Yunus Parvez as Rahim Chacha
- D. K. Sapru as Mr. Agarwal, building owner.
- Aruna Irani as item number in a cameo appearance in "Koi Mar Jaye".

== Production ==
=== Story and screenplay ===
The film's screenplay, story and dialogues were written by Salim–Javed (Salim Khan and Javed Akhtar). The main inspiration for the plot was the film Gunga Jumna (1961), starring Dilip Kumar, which had a similar premise of two brothers on opposing sides of the law, with the elder criminal brother as the main character. Deewaar is thus considered to be a spiritual successor to Gunga Jumna. Salim–Javed credited Gunga Jumna as well as Mehboob Khan's Mother India (1957) as the main inspirations for Deewaar, which they described as a "more urban, much more contemporary" take on their themes; while Mother India and Gunga Jumna took place in a rural context, Salim–Javed reinterpreted their themes in a contemporary urban context with Deewaar.

Amitabh Bachchan's character, Vijay, was loosely inspired by the real-life Mumbai underworld gangster Haji Mastan. Vijay's story arc in the film parallels that of Mastan's life, such as the rise from a humble dockyard porter to a powerful smuggler, and Mastan's rivalry with smuggler Sukkur Narayan Bakhia is similar to Vijay's rivalry with Samant (Madan Puri).

Salim–Javed's screenplay had dynamic dialogues and incorporated a number of symbolic motifs. For example, the scene where the two brothers meet as adults takes place under a bridge, symbolizing a bridge forming between the brothers. Set in the Dharavi slums of Mumbai, the film's story of gangsters in Dharavi was a critique of socio-political inequality and injustice in Mumbai. The characterisations of the two brothers are sociologically contextualised to represent a form of urban conflict and drama, aimed at presenting a causal explanation for the sequence of events and Vijay's social alienation, with the narrative explaining his every action and decision, grounded in his memories and experiences.

The script generally has an atmosphere of secularism, while incorporating subtle religious motifs. The mother Sumitra (Nirupa Roy) and police brother Ravi (Shashi Kapoor) are religious Hindus, whereas the criminal brother Vijay (Bachchan) is generally not religious and "upset with God", yet he carries a badge numbered 786 which his Muslim co-worker, Rahim Chacha (Yunus Parvez), points out to be a number of religious significance in Islam (representing Bismillah) and has its own subplot. The 786 badge plays a powerful and symbolic role in several scenes, saving Vijay at key moments and signifying something ominous when he loses it.

Salim–Javed initially showed the script to Bachchan, whom they had in mind for Vijay's role after having worked with him on Zanjeer (1973). At the time, Bachchan was working on another film with Yash Chopra, and told him about the script. After some initial scepticism, Chopra was eventually convinced to direct the film after Salim–Javed narrated the storyline to him.

=== Casting and filming ===
Bachchan's "angry young man" performance as Vijay in the film was inspired by Dilip Kumar's intense performance as Gunga in Gunga Jumna, which Bachchan sharpened and reinterpreted in a contemporary urban context reflecting the changing socio-political climate of 1970s India.

Salim–Javed "felt only Bachchan could do justice to Vijay's role." According to Akhtar, they "saw his talent, which most makers didn't. He was exceptional, a genius actor who was in films that weren't good." At Salim–Javed's insistence, Bachchan was cast in the role. Director Yash Chopra's first choices for Vijay and Ravi's roles were Dev Anand and Rajesh Khanna respectively. After Anand rejected the script, casting plans changed and Khanna was to play Vijay and Navin Nischol was considered for Ravi. However, Salim–Javed had Amitabh Bachchan and Shatrughan Sinha in mind when they wrote the script; Sinha turned down the film when he heard Khanna was initially cast in the lead, due to a fallout between the two. Nirupa Roy's role as Sumitra Devi was also first offered to Vyjayanthimala; Nischol and Vyjayanthimala turned down the film after they found out Khanna would no longer be involved. Shashi Kapoor was subsequently cast as Ravi, and Nirupa Roy as Sumitra Devi.

In 2014, Bachchan revealed that his iconic look in the film – a "denim blue shirt worn with khakee pants and a rope dangling over the shoulder" – was the result of a mistake by the tailor. He said, "The knotted shirt and rope on the shoulder in [Deewaar] was an adjustment for an error in stitching, shirt too long so knotted it". In certain scenes, Bachchan had some input on Chopra's direction, such as the father's funeral scene where Bachchan, instead of lighting the pyre with his right hand, suggests to use his left hand to show off the tattoo with the inscription "mera baap chor hai" ("my father is a thief"). The film was shot mostly at night because Bachchan was also shooting for Ramesh Sippy's Sholay at that time.

The film contains a fight scene that involves Bachchan performing martial arts inspired by Hong Kong martial arts cinema, which Deewaar was one of the first to do in Indian cinema. Rather than following the Hollywood model, it follows the Hong Kong model, with an emphasis on acrobatics and stunts. The style of fighting seen in Deewaar combined kung fu (as it was perceived by Indians) with Indian martial arts (particularly Indian wrestling).

== Soundtrack ==
Deewaar

Soundtrack album to Deewaar by R. D. Burman
- Released: 1975
- Genre: Feature film soundtrack
- Language: Hindustani
- Label: Universal
- Producer: R. D. Burman

The soundtrack of the movie was composed by R. D. Burman, and the lyrics were penned by Sahir Ludhianvi. The soundtrack received praise and was notably one of the few Yash Chopra films not to contain vocals by Lata Mangeshkar.

Track listing
No.	Title	Singer(s)	Length
1.	"Kehdoon Tumhe, Ya Chup Rahun"	Kishore Kumar, Asha Bhosle	4:09
2.	"Maine Tujhe Maanga, Tujhe Paaya Hai"	Kishore Kumar, Asha Bhosle	4:29
3.	"Koi Mar Jaaye"	Asha Bhosle, Usha Mangeshkar	5:37
4.	"Deewaron Ka Jungle"	Manna Dey	5:06
5.	"Idhar Ka Mal Udhar"	Bhupinder Singh	3:23
6.	"I Am Falling in Love with a Stranger"	Ursula Vaz	5:15
Total length:			27:19

== Box office ==
At the Indian box office, the film grossed ₹75 million ($9 million). (Note: 8.3759 Indian rupees per US dollar in 1975) In Mumbai alone, the film grossed ₹10 million. In terms of footfalls, the film sold an estimated 31 million tickets at an average 1975 price of ₹2.40 per ticket. Adjusted for inflation, this is equivalent to an estimated ₹4.17 billion ($64 million) at an average 2017 price of ₹134.38 per ticket.

== Critical reception and legacy ==
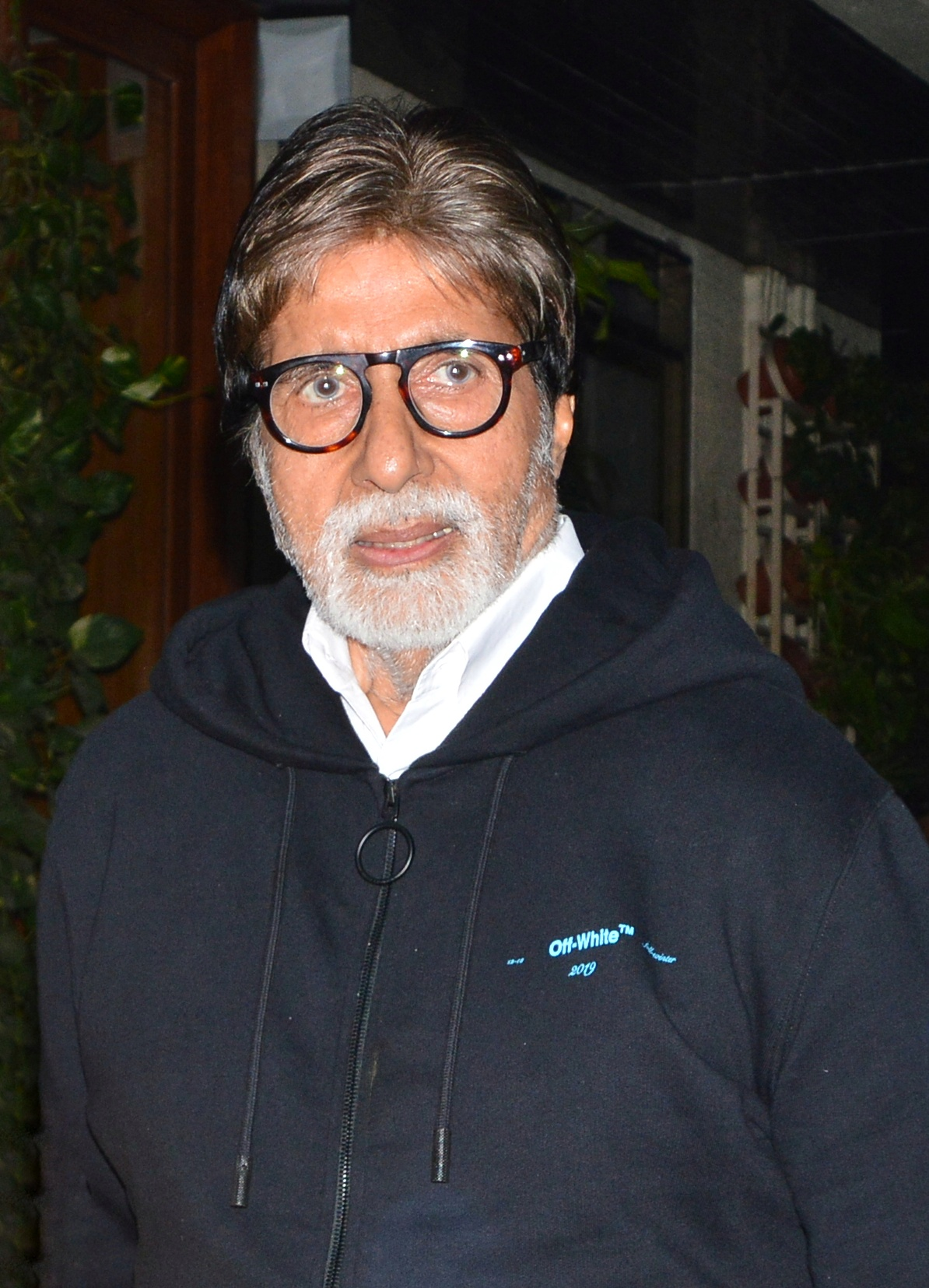
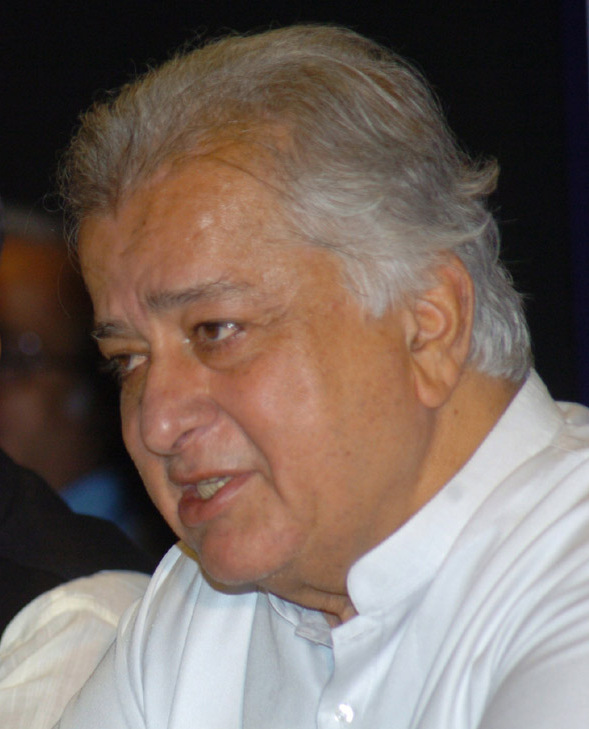
The performances of Amitabh Bachchan (left), Shashi Kapoor (centre), and Nirupa Roy garnered critical acclaim; each received Filmfare Award nominations, with Kapoor winning.

Upon release, Deewaar was a blockbuster, ranking as the fourth-highest-grossing Bollywood film of 1975, and received critical acclaim, with critics praising the story, dialogue and screenplay, as well as the performances of the cast, particularly those of Bachchan, Kapoor and Roy. Indiatimes ranks Deewaar amongst the Top 25 Must See Bollywood Films. It is one of the three Hindi films featured in the 2017 edition of the book 1001 Movies You Must See Before You Die, the others being Mother India (1957) and Dilwale Dulhania Le Jayenge (1995).

It was perceived by audiences to be anti-establishment, while Amitabh Bachchan's character Vijay was seen as a vigilante angry hero, establishing Bachchan's image as the "angry young man" of Indian cinema. This resonance was amplified by the film's release six months prior to India's Emergency period (June 25, 1975– March 21, 1977), a time of political repression under Prime Minister Indira Gandhi that imposed strict censorship on media. In the 2025 book 1975: The Year That Transformed Bollywood by Pratik Majumdar, Deewaar is highlighted as part of 1975's "powerful line-up" of landmark movies, alongside Sholay, Chupke Chupke, Julie, Aandhi, and Nishant. Majumdar portrays 1975 as a "turning point" in Bollywood, where, despite censorship challenges, cinema produced a "blessing in disguise" of 15–30 films (out of 80 released) that captured the era's "hopes, fears, and complexities" through "courageous scripts." The book argues that Deewaar contributed to the "action film era" by fusing bold narratives on political disillusionment with commercial appeal, reflecting societal truths that remain relevant five decades later. With the unprecedented growth of slums across India at the time, Vijay was seen as a new kind of hero, with his suppressed rage giving a voice to the angst of the urban poor.

Deewaar is also remembered for its iconic dialogues written by Salim–Javed. The most famous example is when Shashi Kapoor delivers the line, "Mere paas maa hai" ("I have mother"), a line that is widely known in India and has become part of Indian popular culture. The film Loins of Punjab Presents (2007) mocked how the line is sometimes wrongly attributed to Amitabh Bachchan. It also established Parveen Babi as the "new Bollywood woman".

The film cemented the success of the writing duo Salim–Javed, who went on to write many more blockbuster films. After the success of this film, the value of film writers skyrocketed thanks to Salim–Javed, and they soon were being paid as highly as some actors at the time. Amitabh Bachchan described Salim–Javed's screenplay for Deewaar as "the perfect script" and "the best screenplay ever" in Indian cinema. Deewaar, one of the first Indian films with an action sequence modelled after Hong Kong martial arts cinema, popularised the use of martial arts sequences in Bollywood films from the 1970s to the 1990s. The style of fighting popularised by Deewaar, with acrobatics and stunts, and combining Chinese kung fu (as it was perceived by Indians, based on 1970s Hong Kong films) with Indian pehlwani wrestling, became the standard model for Bollywood action scenes up until the 1990s.

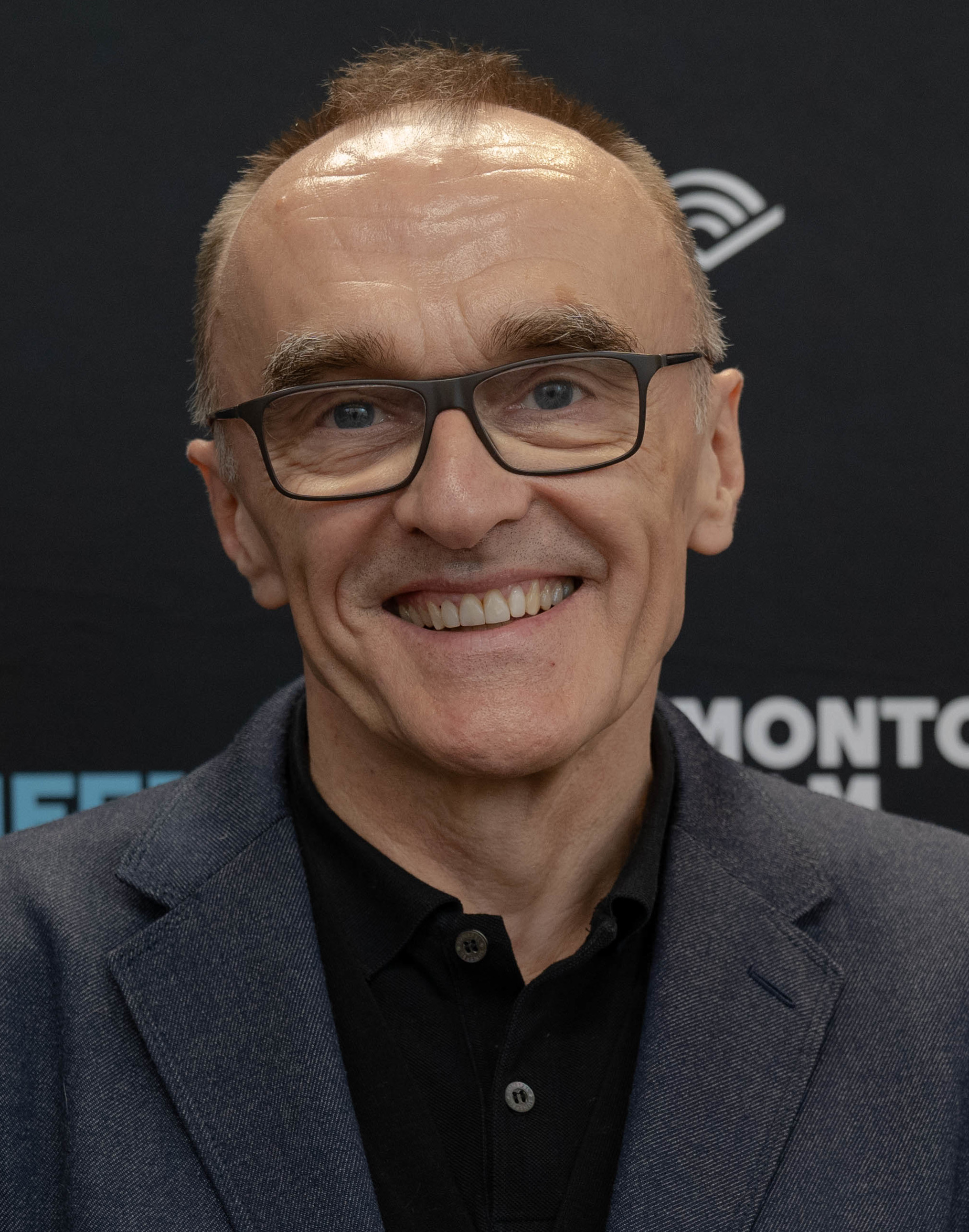
Deewaar was the inspiration behind director Danny Boyle (pictured above)'s Oscar-winning film Slumdog Millionaire (2008).

The film was later remade in Telugu as Magaadu (1976), in Tamil as Thee (1981), in Malayalam as Nathi Muthal Nathi Vare (1983), in Persian as Koose-ye Jonoob (1978), and in Turkish as Acıların Çocuğu (1985). Another remake of Deewaar was the 1994 Bollywood film Aatish: Feel the Fire, starring Sanjay Dutt as the older criminal brother, Atul Agnihotri as the younger police brother, and Tanuja as the mother. Despite the Telugu remake, the film was remade in Telugu again as Railway Coolie (2001).

Deewaar had an influence on Hong Kong cinema and in turn Hollywood cinema, by playing a key role in the creation of the heroic bloodshed crime genre of 1980s Hong Kong action cinema. Hong Kong's Shaw Brothers studio remade Deewaar as The Brothers (1979), which in turn inspired John Woo's internationally acclaimed breakthrough A Better Tomorrow (1986). The Brothers also starred a Hong Kong actor that would later be known for heroic bloodshed films, Danny Lee (playing Shashi Kapoor's character), with a police officer persona later seen in Hong Kong crime films such as Woo's The Killer (1989). Deewaar, along with several later 1970s "angry young man" epics it inspired, such as Amar Akbar Anthony (1977), had similarities to elements later seen in 1980s Hong Kong heroic bloodshed films.

British director Danny Boyle described Deewaar as being "absolutely key to Indian cinema" and cited the film as an influence on his Academy Award winning film Slumdog Millionaire (2008). The film's co-director Loveleen Tandan noted that "Simon Beaufoy studied Salim–Javed's kind of cinema minutely." Actor Anil Kapoor noted that some scenes of Slumdog Millionaire "are like Deewaar, the story of two brothers of whom one is completely after money while the younger one is honest and not interested in money." Slumdog Millionaire, which pays homage to Amitabh Bachchan, has a similar narrative structure to Deewaar. Composer A. R. Rahman referenced the film in his Oscar acceptance speech.

== Awards and nominations ==
Deewaar received the Filmfare Best Movie Award of 1976, and also won six more Filmfare Awards for Best Screenplay, Best Dialogue, Best Director, Best Sound, Best Story, and Best Supporting Actor (Kapoor), and received two other nominations for Best Actor (Bachchan) and Best Supporting Actress (Roy).

Year	Award	Category	Nominee	Result	Ref.
1976	Filmfare Awards	Best Film	Gulshan Rai	Won	
1976	Filmfare Awards	Best Director	Yash Chopra	Won	
1976	Filmfare Awards	Best Actor	Amitabh Bachchan	Nominated	
1976	Filmfare Awards	Best Supporting Actor	Shashi Kapoor	Won	
1976	Filmfare Awards	Best Supporting Actress	Nirupa Roy	Nominated	
1976	Filmfare Awards	Best Story	Salim–Javed	Won	
1976	Filmfare Awards	Best Screenplay	Salim–Javed	Won	
1976	Filmfare Awards	Best Dialogue	Salim–Javed	Won	
1976	Filmfare Awards	Best Sound	M. A. Shaikh	Won	

== See also ==
- Angry young man (India)
- Angry Young Men (mini series)
- The Emergency (India), imposed later in the year (see for the socio-political situation in India at the time)
- 1975 in India
- List of Hindi films of 1975
- List of highest domestic net collection of Hindi films
