= Salim–Javed =

Indian screenwriting duo

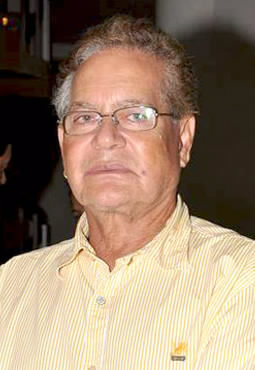
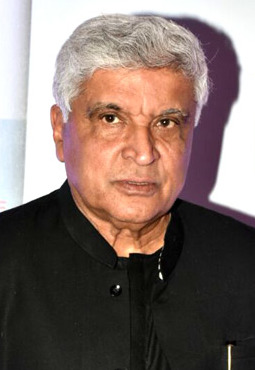
Salim Khan (l) and Javed Akhtar (r), together formed the pair Salim–Javed.

Salim–Javed were an Indian screenwriting duo, composed of Salim Khan and Javed Akhtar, who worked primarily in Hindi cinema. They were among the first Indian screenwriters to achieve star status, and are regarded as among "Hindi cinema's greatest screenwriters". They worked together on 24 films between 1971 and 1987, of which 20 were commercially and critically successful.

Salim–Javed revolutionized Indian cinema in the 1970s, transforming and reinventing the Bollywood formula, and pioneering the Bollywood blockbuster format. A significant departure from the romance films that had previously dominated Bollywood, Salim–Javed were noted for the creation of the "Angry Young Man" character archetype, personified by actor Amitabh Bachchan, the masala film, the Dacoit Western genre, and Bombay underworld crime films. Their association lasted until 1982, when both decided to split; after the separation, Javed Akhtar transitioned into a successful career as a lyricist, writing for over 80 films, while Salim Khan continued screenwriting independently until the mid-1990s. They were later credited together on two post-split releases — Zamana (1985) and Mr. India (1987) — as these scripts had been completed prior to their separation. Many of their films were remade in South Indian languages, often under licenses directly held by Salim–Javed, who retained remake rights to their work.

In 2024, Amazon Prime Video released a three-part documentary series titled Angry Young Men, chronicling the creative partnership, cultural impact, and enduring legacy of the Salim–Javed duo. During the series' promotional events, Javed Akhtar revealed that the duo are considering a reunion to co-write a new feature film together, marking a potential comeback more than four decades after their last collaboration. Akhtar stated that while discussions are at an early stage, both writers are enthusiastic about returning to their storytelling roots and exploring ideas that resonate with contemporary audiences.

== Before teaming up ==
=== Salim Khan ===
Salim Khan was born on 24 November 1935 in Indore. He debuted as an actor after director K. Amarnath saw him at a wedding and was impressed by his good looks. He asked him to come to Mumbai, where he hired him as an actor for Rs. 500 a month. Salim Khan was earlier a junior technician for various films had not made any considerable mark in the field. Khan acted in various movies, in large and small parts, for seven years. He was unable to capture the public's interest, and, as a result, his career had stalled. Khan appeared in such films as Teesri Manzil (1966), Sarhaadi Lootera (1966) and Diwaana (1967), in total he has acted in 14 films till 1970. But he did not achieve success as an actor.

After working in 25 films, despite his handsome looks, he eventually understood that he "was not cut out to be an actor because I lacked the art of projection. But by then it was too late — how could I have gone back to Indore?" In the late 1960s, Salim Khan, who was struggling financially, decided to start shifting his focus away from acting and towards writing scripts, and continued to use the name Prince Salim. One of his more notable film scripts was Do Bhai (1969). He also began working with Abrar Alvi as a writing assistant.

=== Javed Akhtar ===
Javed Akhtar was born on 17 January 1945. Early influences on Akhtar included Urdu novels by Pakistani author Ibn-e-Safi, such as the Jasoosi Dunya and Imran series of detective novels, as well as films like the Dilip Kumar starrers Arzoo (1950) and Aan (1952), Bimal Roy's Do Bigha Zameen (1953), Shree 420 (1955) directed by Raj Kapoor and written by Khwaja Ahmad Abbas, and Mehboob Khan's Mother India (1957).

Akhtar arrived in Mumbai on 4 October 1964. In his early years there, he wrote the dialogue for a minor film for Rs. 100. Occasionally, he worked as an assistant. He got a job as a dialogue-writer on Yakeen which flopped. He was unsuccessful in his individual ventures till 1971.

== History ==
=== After teaming up ===
Salim met up with Javed Akhtar for first time during the making of the film Sarhadi Lootera. Salim was a small-time actor, and Sarhadi Lootera was one of the last films he acted in before he turned his attention to writing. Javed was a clapper boy for the film and was later made the dialogue writer as director S.M. Sagar was unable to find a dialogue writer. While working in this film their friendship began.

Salim Khan used to assist writer/director Abrar Alvi at first and Javed Akhtar used to assist Kaifi Azmi. Abrar Alvi and Kaifi Azmi were neighbours, from there on Salim Khan and Javed Akhtar became friends. Since their individual work was flopping both of them ventured into script writing and they decided to team up in 1971. Realizing the lack of writers in the movie making industry, Salim gradually learnt about story telling and writing techniques used in films, along with close friend Javed Akhtar and began writing short transcripts. The duo hit it off well and formed a script-writing team that came to be known as Salim–Javed. Salim used to form stories and plots whereas Javed used to help Salim with the dialogues for those films. They used to brainstorm and come to conclusions regarding the final draft of the film. Akhtar first joined Khan to develop the story for Adhikar and Andaz (both 1971).

Initially in the 1970s there was no concept of having the same writer for the screenplay, story and dialogue nor were the writers given any credits in the title. Rajesh Khanna is credited with giving Salim Khan and Javed Akhtar their first chance to become screenplay writers by offering them work in Haathi Mere Saathi (1971). Javed Akhtar accepted in an interview that "One day, he went to Salimsaab and said that Mr. Devar had given him a huge signing amount with which he could complete the payment for his bungalow Aashirwad. But the film was a remake [of Deiva Cheyal] and the script of the original was far from being satisfactory. He told us that if we could set right the script, he would make sure we got both money and credit." Salim–Javed were hired by G. P. Sippy's Sippy Films as resident screenwriters and produced the screenplays for successful films like Andaz, Seeta Aur Geeta, Sholay and Don. They have worked together in 24 films including two hit Kannada films (both starring Dr.Rajkumar) – Premada Kanike and Raja Nanna Raja. Though they split in 1982, due to unknown issues, some of the scripts they wrote were made into hit films later like Zamana and Mr. India.

Salim–Javed (as they are famously called) have scripted many commercially and critically accepted movies for movie making giants like Nasir Hussain (Yaadon Ki Baaraat), Prakash Mehra (Zanjeer and Haath Ki Safai), Ravi Tandon (Majboor), Yash Chopra (Deewaar, Trishul and Kaala Patthar), Yash Johar (Dostana), Ramesh Sippy (Seeta Aur Geeta and Sholay), Ramesh Talwar (Zamana), Shekhar Kapoor (Mr. India) and with Chand Barot (Don). The duo split up in the early 1982 and ended their 12-year professional relationship because of unknown issues. Of the 24 films they wrote the scripts for, the film which were not successful at box office include Aakhri Dao (1975), Immaan Dharam (1977), Kaala Patthar (1979) and Shaan (1981).

=== After their split ===
Salim Khan after the split was not very active in films. Though he did write the scripts for about 10 films after his split with Javed Akhthar like Naam (1986), Kabzaa, Toofan (1989), Jurm (1990), Akayla, Patthar Ke Phool, Mast Kalandar (all in 1991), Aa Gale Lag Jaa (1994), Majhdhaar and Dil Tera Diwana (both 1996). Of these scripts, Toofan, Akayla, Majhdaar, Aa Gale Lag Jaa and Dil Tera Deewana failed at the box office. Salim Khan's eldest son, Salman Khan, made his film debut at the age of twenty two with Biwi Ho To Aisi in the year 1988 and eventually went on to become one of the most influential and successful actors in the history of Indian Cinema. Salman Khan has collaborated with his father Salim Khan in Patthar Ke Phool and Majhdhaar, and with Javed Akhtar in only one film – Marigold (2007), in his three-decade long career. Javed Akhtar, on the other hand, has worked in all the films produced by his children Farhan Akhtar and Zoya Akhtar's Excel Entertainment. Javed Akhtar started writing lyrics for films beginning with Silsila in 1981 and since 1982 has written lyrics for around 80 films and scripts for over 20 films till the present times. Javed and Salim were not even on talking terms after their split till 2012, when their original script Zanjeer was being remade into a 2013 film of the same name by producer Sumeet Mehra. Salim and Javed had filed a suit in the Bombay High Court in July 2013 claiming they had copyrights over the script, story and dialogues of the original film, produced by Prakash Mehra and demanded compensation from the makers of the remake. This court case brought them together again on talking terms.

Their last unofficial partnership was for the film Baghban (2003). Amitabh Bachchan requested to Javed Akhtar to write his final speech. Salman Khan, for his speech prior to that, requested his father Salim Khan to write his speech. However, neither Salim Khan nor Javed Akhtar were credited.

== Style, themes and influence ==
Salim–Javed's films had a wider impact on Indian society, with themes relevant to the socio-economic and socio-political climate of 1970s India, especially during The Emergency period, such as urban slum poverty, political corruption, and organized crime, while presenting progressive, feminist and anti-establishment themes, which resonated with Indian audiences in the 1970s and early 1980s. During their time working together, the duo won six Filmfare Awards, out of ten nominations.

According to Javed Akhtar, in their early periods, on the cinema posters, there were no names of script writer, story and screenplay. Realizing that the hard work is done by this duo, and not getting the appropriate recognition, Salim and Javed decided to paint their names on all the posters pasted in the city. They hired a rikshaw and put the paint bucket on that and did all the work themselves the entire night. After that, the directors also started to put their name on the posters.

While working together, Salim Khan was largely responsible for developing the stories and characters, which were considered unconventional at the time, while Javed Akhtar was largely responsible for writing the dialogues. Many of the dialogues they wrote for their films have become famous. Although the dialogues are often referred to as Hindi, they are actually mostly in Urdu, a register of the Hindustani language. Coming from backgrounds in Urdu literature, they mostly included vocabulary from Urdu, and wrote their dialogues in Urdu script, which was then transcribed by an assistant into Devanagari script so that Hindi readers could also read them. The duo made the writer's role popular with their names appearing in the posters of the films, and in some films they shared up to 25% of the profit.

=== Bollywood cinema ===
Salim–Javed as writers revolutionized Indian cinema, particularly Bollywood. At the time, Hindi cinema was experiencing thematic stagnation, dominated by family-friendly romance films with "romantic hero" leads. The arrival of the non-conformist screenwriter pair Salim–Javed marked a paradigm shift for the industry, with their creative innovations that proved to be a significant breakthrough for Hindi cinema, and resurrected Indian cinema.

Salim–Javed began the genre of gritty, violent, Bombay underworld crime films, in the 1970s, with films such as Zanjeer (1973) and Deewaar (1975). Deewaar, which pitted "a policeman against his brother, a gang leader based on real-life smuggler Haji Mastan" portrayed by Bachchan, was described as being "absolutely key to Indian cinema" by Danny Boyle.

They also pioneered the masala film format. Yaadon Ki Baarat (1973), directed by Nasir Hussain and written by Salim–Javed, has been identified as the first masala film and the "first" quintessentially "Bollywood" film. Salim–Javed subsequently went on to write more successful masala films in the 1970s and 1980s.

Both of these trends, the violent crime film and the masala film, came together with the blockbuster Sholay (1975). It combined the dacoit film conventions of Mother India (1957) and Gunga Jumna (1961) with that of Spaghetti Westerns, spawning the Dacoit Western genre (also known as the "Curry Western"), which was popular in the 1970s. Sholay is considered to be one of the greatest Indian films of all time. It has been described as the "Star Wars of Bollywood", with its impact on Bollywood comparable to the impact Star Wars (1977) later had on Hollywood, while the villain Gabbar Singh (Amjad Khan) has been compared to Darth Vader. Salim–Javed also created the Don franchise, one of the biggest Indian film franchises.

Salim Khan conceived the "angry young man" persona that Amitabh Bachchan that became famous for, and introduced him to directors Prakash Mehra and Manmohan Desai. Salim–Javed often wrote their scripts with Bachchan in mind for the lead role, and insisted he be cast for their films early in his career, including Zanjeer, Deewaar, and Sholay, roles which established Bachchan as a superstar.

=== South Indian cinema ===
Their work was also highly influential in South Indian cinema. In addition to writing two Kannada films – the highly successful Rajkumar and Arathi starrers of 1976 – Raja Nanna Raja and Premada Kanike, many of their Bollywood films had remakes produced in other South Indian film industries, including Tamil cinema, Telugu cinema and Malayalam cinema. While the Bollywood directors and producers held the rights to their films in Northern India, it was Salim–Javed who held the rights to their films in South India, where they sold the remake rights to various South Indian filmmakers, usually for around ₹1 lakh (equivalent to ₹42 lakh or US$45,000 in 2026) each, for films such as Zanjeer, Yaadon Ki Baarat, and Don.

Much like their role in launching the career of Amitabh Bachchan, Salim–Javed also played an important role in launching the career of South Indian superstar Rajinikanth. Several Tamil remakes of their films became breakthroughs for Rajinikanth, who was cast in Amitabh Bachchan's role. The Tamil remake of Don (1978) in particular, Billa (1980), was a turning point in Rajinikanth's career, as his first blockbuster hit. He also starred in several other hit Salim–Javed adaptations in Bachchan's role, including Thee (1981), Mr. Bharath (1986), and Naan Vazhavaippen (1979). Of the four prominent south industries, their movies were remade the least in Kannada.

Screenwriter V. Vijayendra Prasad, responsible for a number of blockbusters in the early 21st century, including the South Indian franchise Baahubali and the 2015 Hindi film Bajrangi Bhaijaan (starring Salim's son Salman Khan), cited Salim–Javed as a major inspiration on his work, especially their screenplay for Sholay, among other films.

=== Indian society ===
Salim–Javed's films had a wider impact on Indian society. Their films reflected the socio-economic and socio-political realities of 1970s India, channeling the growing popular discontent and disillusionment among the masses, and the failure of the state in ensuring their welfare and well-being, in a time when prices were rapidly rising, commodities were becoming scarce, public institutions were losing legitimacy, and smugglers and gangsters were gathering political clout. There was also an unprecedented growth of slums across India in the 1970s, particularly in Bombay, the most famous being Dharavi, which was represented in Deewaar (1975).

Their films often dealt with themes relevant to Indian society at the time, such as urban poverty in slums, corruption in society, and the Bombay underworld crime scene. While inspired by Mehboob Khan's Mother India (1957) and Dilip Kumar's Gunga Jumna (1961), Salim–Javed reinterpreted their rural themes in a contemporary urban context reflecting the changing socio-political climate of 1970s India, which resonated with Indian audiences in the 1970s.

Some of their films in the 1970s, especially Deewaar, were perceived by audiences to be anti-establishment. This was represented by the "angry young man", conceived by Salim–Javed and portrayed by Amitabh Bachchan, often presented as a vigilante or anti-hero, establishing Bachchan's image as the "angry young man" of Indian cinema. The "angry young man" was seen as a new kind of hero, with his suppressed rage giving a voice to the angst of the urban poor.

Their portrayal of female heroines was also progressive and feminist for Indian society the time. For example, Seeta Aur Geeta (1972) subverted the formula of Dilip Kumar starrer Ram Aur Shyam (1972), replacing twin brothers with twin sisters, and having the heroine Hema Malini eventually become the "hero" while male lead Dharmendra is in a mostly supporting role. Parveen Babi's character in Deewaar is portrayed as "a modern woman who felt no guilt or shame in having pre-marital sex, drinking or smoking," which was "novel and revolutionary" at the time, and she became seen as the "new Bollywood woman". Similar feminist undertones appear in Sholay (1975), where Basanti (Hema Malini) is a "straight-talking, earthy and independent young woman doing a man’s job".

=== International cinema ===
Beyond their influence on Indian films, their work has also influenced international films. Their 1975 film Deewaar had an influence on Hong Kong cinema and in turn Hollywood cinema, by playing a key role in the creation of the heroic bloodshed crime genre of 1980s Hong Kong action cinema. Deewaar, along with several later 1970s "angry young man" epics it inspired, such as Amar Akbar Anthony (1977), had similarities to elements later seen in 1980s Hong Kong heroic bloodshed films. Hong Kong's Shaw Brothers studio remade Deewaar as The Brothers (1979), which in turn inspired John Woo's internationally acclaimed breakthrough A Better Tomorrow (1986). A Better Tomorrow set the template for heroic bloodshed films, a genre that went on to have a significant influence on Hong Kong films in the 1980s and later Hollywood movies in the 1990s, inspiring filmmakers such as Quentin Tarantino along with John Woo's entry into Hollywood.

According to Loveleen Tandan, the screenwriter Simon Beaufoy, who wrote the screenplay for the Academy Award winning Slumdog Millionaire (2008), "studied Salim-Javed's kind of cinema minutely." In particular, Deewaar was praised by Danny Boyle and influenced the making of Slumdog Millionaire. Actor Anil Kapoor (who stars in the film) noted that some scenes of Slumdog Millionaire "are like Deewaar, the story of two brothers of whom one is completely after money while the younger one is honest and not interested in money." One of the techniques often used by Salim–Javed was their use of a montage sequence to represent a child growing into an adult, a technique that dates back to Awaara (1951), directed by Raj Kapoor and written by Khwaja Ahmad Abbas. For example, Deewaar showed a character entering a temple as a child and then leaving the temple as an adult. Slumdog Millionaire paid homage to Salim–Javed by showing a montage sequence where two "brothers jump off a train and suddenly they are seven years older". In Slumdog Millionaire, two characters have names referencing the duo: Salim K. Malik (brother of protagonist Jamal Malik) and Javed Khan (played by Mahesh Manjrekar).

== Filmography ==
=== Hindi films ===
List of Hindi film credits
Year	Title	Director	Cast	Notes
1971	Adhikar	S.M. Sagar	Ashok Kumar, Nanda, Deb Mukherjee	
1971	Andaz	Ramesh Sippy	Rajesh Khanna, Hema Malini, Shammi Kapoor, Simi Garewal	
1971	Haathi Mere Saathi	M. A. Thirumugam	Rajesh Khanna, Tanuja	Based on 1967 Tamil movie Deiva Cheyal by the same production house.
1972	Seeta Aur Geeta	Ramesh Sippy	Dharmendra, Hema Malini, Sanjeev Kumar	
1973	Zanjeer	Prakash Mehra	Amitabh Bachchan, Jaya Bhaduri, Pran, Ajit Khan, Bindu	
1973	Yaadon Ki Baaraat	Nasir Hussain	Dharmendra, Zeenat Aman, Vijay Arora, Tariq Khan	
1974	Majboor	Ravi Tandon	Amitabh Bachchan, Parveen Babi, Pran	Inspired by Zig Zag and Cold Sweat.
1974	Haath Ki Safai	Prakash Mehra	Randhir Kapoor, Vinod Khanna, Hema Malini, Simi Garewal, Ranjeet	
1975	Deewaar	Yash Chopra	Amitabh Bachchan, Shashi Kapoor, Parveen Babi, Neetu Singh	
1975	Sholay	Ramesh Sippy	Dharmendra, Amitabh Bachchan, Sanjeev Kumar, Hema Malini, Jaya Bhaduri	It was ranked first in the British Film Institute's 2002 poll of "Top 10 Indian Films" of all time. 50th annual Filmfare Awards named it the Best Film of 50 Years. Remade in Hindi as Ram Gopal Varma Ki Aag (2007)
1975	Aakhri Dao	A. Salaam	Jeetendra, Saira Banu, Danny Denzongpa	The film is based on Vermaji's 1950 novel of the same name.
1977	Immaan Dharam	Desh Mukherjee	Amitabh Bachchan, Shashi Kapoor, Sanjeev Kumar, Rekha	
1977	Chacha Bhatija	Manmohan Desai	Dharmendra, Randhir Kapoor, Hema Malini	
1978	Trishul	Yash Chopra	Amitabh Bachchan, Sanjeev Kumar, Shashi Kapoor, Hema Malini	
1978	Don	Chandra Barot	Amitabh Bachchan, Zeenat Aman, Helen	
1979	Kaala Patthar	Yash Chopra	Amitabh Bachchan, Shashi Kapoor, Rakhee Gulzar, Shatrughan Sinha, Neetu Singh, Parveen Babi	
1980	Dostana	Raj Khosla	Amitabh Bachchan, Shatrughan Sinha, Zeenat Aman, Prem Chopra, Pran, Amrish Puri, Helen	
1980	Shaan	Ramesh Sippy	Sunil Dutt, Amitabh Bachchan, Shashi Kapoor, Shatrughan Sinha, Rakhee Gulzar, Parveen Babi	
1981	Kranti	Manoj Kumar	Dilip Kumar, Manoj Kumar, Shashi Kapoor, Hema Malini, Shatrughan Sinha, Parveen Babi	
1982	Shakti	Ramesh Sippy	Dilip Kumar, Amitabh Bachchan, Raakhee, Anil Kapoor	It was the only film to feature veteran actors Dilip Kumar and Amitabh Bachchan together on screen. The movie had a similar storyline as that of the 1974 Tamil movie Thanga Pathakkam starring Sivaji Ganesan which was already remade in 1982 in Hindi as Farz Aur Kanoon starring Jeetendra
1985	Zamana	Ramesh Talwar	Rajesh Khanna, Rishi Kapoor, Poonam Dhillon, Ranjeeta Kaur	The film was successful at the box office with collection of 4.5 crores in 1985.
1987	Mr. India	Shekhar Kapur	Anil Kapoor, Sridevi, Amrish Puri	The film was the second biggest hit of 1987, and remains a cult classic in India.
2003	Baghban	Ravi Chopra	Amitabh Bachchan, Salman Khan, Hema Malini, Aman Verma, Samir Soni, Mahima Chaudhry, Rimi Sen	Uncredited.

=== Kannada films ===
List of Kannada film credits
Year	Title	Director	Cast	Notes
1976	Premada Kanike	V. Somashekhar	Rajkumar, Aarathi	Based on 1969 Hindi film Do Bhai by Salim Khan (credited as Prince Salim), which was also remade in Tamil as Justice Viswanathan and in Telugu as Nenu Manishine. Premada Kanike was later remade in Tamil as Polladhavan and in Hindi as Raaz
1976	Raja Nanna Raja	A. V. Seshagiri Rao	Rajkumar, Aarathi	Inspiration for Magadheera

== Awards and nominations ==
=== Filmfare Awards ===
Filmfare Awards
Year	Category	Film	Result
1974	Best Screenplay	Zanjeer (1973)	Won
1974	Best Story	Zanjeer (1973)	Won
1976	Best Story	Deewaar (1975)	Won
1976	Best Screenplay	Deewaar (1975)	Won
1976	Best Dialogue	Deewaar (1975)	Won
1976	Best Story	Sholay (1975)	Nominated
1979	Best Story	Trishul (1978)	Nominated
1980	Best Story	Kaala Patthar (1979)	Nominated
1983	Best Story	Shakti (1982)	Nominated
1983	Best Screenplay	Shakti (1982)	Won

Films with Salim–Javed writing credits that were nominated for or won the Filmfare Award for Best Film:

- Zanjeer (1973) – Nominated
- Deewaar (1975) – Won
- Sholay (1975) – Nominated
- Trishul (1978) – Nominated
- Kaala Patthar (1979) – Nominated
- Shakti (1982) – Won
- Baghban (2003) – Nominated
- Don: The Chase Begins Again (2006) – Nominated

Sholay received a special award at the 50th Filmfare Awards in 2005: Best Film of 50 Years.

=== British Film Institute ===
Sholay (1975) was ranked first in the British Film Institute's 2002 poll of "Top 10 Indian Films" of all time.

== Box office performance ==
The following table lists the box office performance of Bollywood films written by Salim–Javed. The table covers the domestic box office in India, in addition to the overseas box office. The vast majority of the overseas box office for their films up until the 1980s came from the Soviet Union, which was the largest overseas market for Indian films up until then.

The gross revenue figures in the table do not take inflation into account. The gross revenue numbers given below are nominal figures, not inflation-adjusted figures. In terms of footfalls (ticket sales), the 22 films listed below are estimated to have sold a total of over 900 million tickets worldwide, averaging more than 40 million ticket sales per film.

Box office performance of Bollywood films written by Salim–Javed
Year	Film	Box office gross revenue (est.)						Footfalls (est. ticket sales)		
Year	Film	India		Overseas		Worldwide		India	Overseas	Worldwide
Year	Film	INR	USD	USD	INR	INR	USD	India	Overseas	Worldwide
1971	Andaz	₹40,000,000	$5,300,000	—N/a	—N/a	₹40,000,000	$5,300,000	21,000,000	—N/a	21,000,000
1971	Haathi Mere Saathi	₹70,000,000	$9,300,000	$11,920,000 (Note: 34,800,000 Soviet ticket sales in 1974, average 25 kopecks per ticket, 0.73 руб per US$ in 1974.)	₹97,000,000	₹167,000,000	$17,220,000	37,000,000	34,800,000	71,800,000
1972	Seeta Aur Geeta	₹65,000,000	$8,600,000	$18,600,000 (Note: 55,200,000 Soviet ticket sales in 1976, average 0.25 руб per ticket, 0.742 руб per US$ in 1976.)	₹167,000,000	₹232,000,000	$27,200,000	20,000,000	55,200,000	75,200,000
1973	Zanjeer	₹60,000,000	$7,800,000	$14,600,000 (Note: 37,300,000 Soviet ticket sales in 1980, average 0.25 руб per ticket, 0.637 руб per US$ in 1980.)	₹115,000,000	₹175,000,000	$22,440,000	29,000,000	37,300,000	66,300,000
1973	Yaadon Ki Baaraat	₹55,000,000	$7,100,000	—N/a	—N/a	₹55,000,000	$7,100,000	27,000,000	—N/a	27,000,000
1974	Haath Ki Safai	₹30,000,000	$3,800,000	—N/a	—N/a	₹30,000,000	$3,800,000	13,000,000	—N/a	13,000,000
1974	Majboor	₹26,000,000	$3,300,000	—N/a	—N/a	₹26,000,000	$3,300,000	11,000,000	—N/a	11,000,000
1975	Deewaar	₹75,000,000	$9,500,000	—N/a	—N/a	₹75,000,000	$9,500,000	31,000,000	—N/a	31,000,000
1975	Sholay	₹350,000,000	$45,000,000	$23,500,000 (Note: 60,000,000 ticket sales in the Soviet Union (including re-runs after 1979 release), average 0.25 руб per ticket, 0.637 руб per US$ in 1980.)	₹267,000,000	₹617,000,000	$68,500,000	150,000,000+	60,000,000+	250,000,000
1977	Chacha Bhatija	₹70,000,000	$8,900,000	—N/a	—N/a	₹70,000,000	$8,900,000	28,000,000	—N/a	28,000,000
1977	Immaan Dharam	₹26,000,000	$3,300,000	—N/a	—N/a	₹26,000,000	$3,300,000	10,000,000	—N/a	10,000,000
1978	Trishul	₹110,000,000	$14,000,000	$11,700,000 (Note: 29,700,000 Soviet ticket sales in 1980, average 0.25 руб per ticket, 0.637 руб per US$ in 1980.)	₹92,000,000	₹202,000,000	$25,700,000	43,000,000	29,700,000	72,700,000
1978	Don	₹70,000,000	$8,900,000	—N/a	—N/a	₹70,000,000	$8,900,000	27,000,000	—N/a	27,000,000
1979	Kaala Patthar	₹60,000,000	$7,600,000	—N/a	—N/a	₹60,000,000	$7,600,000	25,000,000	—N/a	25,000,000
1980	Dostana	₹90,000,000	$11,500,000	—N/a	—N/a	₹90,000,000	$11,500,000	31,000,000	—N/a	31,000,000
1980	Shaan	₹120,000,000	$15,300,000	—N/a	—N/a	₹120,000,000	$15,300,000	41,000,000	—N/a	41,000,000
1981	Kranti	₹200,000,000	$23,100,000	—N/a	—N/a	₹200,000,000	$23,100,000	60,000,000	—N/a	60,000,000
1982	Shakti	₹80,000,000	$8,500,000	—N/a	—N/a	₹80,000,000	$8,500,000	19,000,000	—N/a	19,000,000
1987	Mr. India	₹100,000,000	$7,720,000	Unknown	Unknown	₹100,000,000+	$7,720,000+	24,000,000	Unknown	24,000,000+
1994	Aatish: Feel the Fire	₹117,500,000	$3,700,000	$165,000	₹5,197,500	₹122,697,500	$3,865,000	11,728,000	39,500	11,767,473
2003	Baghban	₹405,000,000	$8,700,000	$2,670,000	₹124,400,000	₹529,400,000	$11,370,000	7,973,000	331,841	8,304,841
2006	Don: The Chase Begins Again	₹775,000,000	$17,100,000	$7,880,000	₹358,540,000	₹1,133,540,000	$24,980,000	12,487,000	634,226	13,121,226
Total box office		₹2,994,500,000	$238,000,000	$91,075,000+	₹1,226,137,500+	₹4,220,637,500+	$325,095,000+	679,188,000+	218,005,541+	913,193,540+

== See also ==
- Javed Akhtar
- Salim Khan
- Bollywood
- Indian Cinema
