= Kabzaa =

Kabzaa may refer to:

- Kabzaa (1988 film)
- Kabzaa (2023 film)
