= Wafadar =

Wafadar or Vafadar (lit. 'faithful' in Persian) may refer to:

- Wafadaar, a 1985 Indian film
- Ahmad Vafadar, an Iranian wrestler
- Wafadar Momand, an Afghan cricketer

== See also ==
- Vafadari, an Iranian surname
- Wafa (disambiguation)
