= Magaadu =

Magaadu may refer to:

- Magaadu (1976 film), a Telugu-language action film
- Magaadu (1990 film), a Telugu-language film
