= Do Bhai (1969 film) =

- Theatrical release poster
- Directed by: Brij Sadanah
- Screenplay by: Ramesh Pant
- Story by: Salim Khan (Prince Salim)
- Produced by: Brij Sadanah
- Starring: Ashok Kumar; Mala Sinha; Jeetendra
- Cinematography: S.M. Anwar
- Music by: Laxmikant–Pyarelal
- Production company: Dynamo International
- Release date: 2 January 1969
- Running time: 150 minutes
- Country: India
- Language: Hindi

Do Bhai (transl. Two Brothers) is a 1969 Indian Hindi-language action drama film, produced and directed by Brij Sadanah, and written by Salim Khan (credited as Prince Salim). It stars Ashok Kumar, Mala Sinha, Jeetendra and music composed by Laxmikant–Pyarelal. The film was remade in Tamil in 1971 as Justice Viswanathan and in Telugu in 1971 as Nenu Manishine.

Though the story of this movie is credited only to Salim Khan, the core plot went on to be partially rehashed by the Salim–Javed duo for their debut South Indian movie as original story writers - the 1976 Kannada movie Premada Kanike which was also later remade in Tamil in 1980 as Polladhavan and in Hindi in 1981 as Raaz.

== Cast ==
- Ashok Kumar as Justice Ajay Verma
- Jeetendra as SP Vijay Verma
- Mala Sinha as Sandhya
- Chand Usmani as Ranjana Singh / Ranjana Verma
- Sheikh Mukhtar as Jwala Singh
- Manmohan as Ramesh
- Jagdeep as Gullu
- Malika as Jhuniya
- Gautam Mukherjee
- Asit Sen Gullu's prospective father in law
- C.S. Dubey
- Jayshree T. Dancer at birthday party

== Soundtrack ==
#	Song	Singer
1	"Is Duniya Mein" - 1	Mohammed Rafi
2	"Is Duniya Mein" - 2	Mohammed Rafi
3	"Jeena Hai Tera Bankar"	Mohammed Rafi
4	"Aa, Hum Ahd-E-Wafa Kar Le, Yeh Rasam Ada Kar Le"	Mohammed Rafi, Suman Kalyanpur
5	"Geet Nahin Ban Sakte, Kuch Saaz Aise Hote Hai"	Mohammed Rafi, Asha Bhosle
6	"Main Sunati Hoon"	Asha Bhosle
