= Wafa (disambiguation) =

Wafa is the news agency of the Palestinian National Authority

Wafa or WAFA may also refer to:

- West African Football Academy, Ghanaian football club
- West Australian Football Association, the original name of the West Australian Football League
- Wafa (TV series), a 2016 Pakistani drama television series
- Wafa: A Deadly Love Story, a 2009 Bollywood film
- Wafa Movement, a Tunisian political party
- Wafa Sultan (born 1958), psychiatrist and author known for her criticism of Islam
- Wafaa (name), a common Arabic name
- Wafaa (party), an Algerian political party

== See also ==
- Wafadar (disambiguation)
- Bewafaa (disambiguation)
