= Secretary (1976 film) =

- Theatrical release poster
- Directed by: K. S. Prakash Rao
- Written by: Acharya Aatreya (dialogues)
- Screenplay by: K. S. Prakash Rao
- Story by: Yaddanapudi Sulochana Rani
- Based on: Secretary (Novel)
- Produced by: D. Ramanaidu
- Starring: Akkineni Nageswara Rao; Vanisri
- Cinematography: Vincent
- Edited by: K. A. Marthand
- Music by: K. V. Mahadevan
- Production company: Suresh Productions
- Release date: 28 April 1976
- Running time: 156 mins
- Country: India
- Language: Telugu

Secretary is a 1976 Indian Telugu-language drama film, produced by D. Ramanaidu under Suresh Productions banner and directed by K. S. Prakash Rao. Starring Akkineni Nageswara Rao, Vanisri and music was composed by K. V. Mahadevan. The film was based on Yaddanapudi Sulochana Rani's novel of the same name and was also the last proper film for late Krishna Kumari, even in Telugu.

== Plot ==
The film begins with Jayanti joining as a secretary in Vanitha Vihar the society of high class ladies such as Sumitra Devi, Rekha Rani, Mrs.Karunakaram, etc. Here, she gets acquainted with an industrialist, Raja Shekaram, and he starts liking her as she resembles his past love, Geeta, who has died. Their camaraderie irks the remaining ladies as they indulge in his smartness & wealth. As a result, Jayanti loses her job, so Raja Shekaram appoints her as his secretary. Anyhow, quarrels & disputes arise between them as Jayanti loathes Raja Shekaram's closeness with other ladies. Later, Raja Shekaram realizes Jayanti is his maternal uncle's daughter through their grandmother, and they decide to get married. Upon learning of this, the tycoons, especially Mr & Mrs.Karunakaram, begrudge the decision as they aspire to arrange their daughter Prameela's marriage with Raja Shekaram. So, they ploy & split Jayanti, showing menace to Raja Shekaram. Parallelly, Jayanthi's grandmother also passes away when she quits. Now, Mr. Moneybags creates notoriety as if she eloped, but Dr. Vijayalakshmi shelters Jayanti as a governess to her infants. Plus, her younger sibling Prasad also wants to nuptial Jayanti, which she accepts. Meanwhile, Prameela elopes with a guy, Sivaram, when the big shots are mortified and plead pardon from Raja Shekaram. Surprisingly, to the wheel of fortune, Prasad happens to be Raja Shekaram's bestie. Right now, Raja Shekaram learns about the espousal of Prasad & Jayanth, so he calmly leaves the place. At last, Prasad & Vijayalakshmi are aware of the fact and retrieve Jayanti. Finally, the movie ends on a happy note with the marriage of Raja Shekaram & Jayanti.

== Cast ==
- Akkineni Nageswara Rao as Raja Shekharam
- Vanisri as Jayanti
- Chandra Mohan as Sivaram
- Gummadi as Dr. Subrahmanyam
- Satyanarayana as Karunakaram
- Allu Ramalingaiah as Rekha's husband
- Raja Babu as Vasu
- Ranganath as Dr. Prasad
- Dhulipala as Varma
- T. Subbarami Reddy as SP Sivaram Reddy (cameo)
- D. Ramanaidu as Doctor (cameo)
- Jayasudha as Prameela
- Kanchana as Rekha Rani
- Krishna Kumari as Dr.Vijayalakshmi
- Suryakantham as Sumitra Devi
- Hemalatha as Kameswaramma
- Santha Kumari as Bamma
- Girija as Karunakaram's wife
- Rama Prabha as Vasanthi
- Annapoorna as Sunanda
- Radha Kumari
- Mamatha
- Kalpana Rai as servant maid
- Y. Vijaya
- Master Ramu
- Baby Rohini

== Crew ==
- Art: G. V. Subba Rao
- Choreography: Saleem
- Fights: Madhavan
- Story: Yaddanapudi Sulochana Rani
- Dialogues and Lyrics: Acharya Aatreya
- Playback: S. P. Balasubrahmanyam, P. Susheela, V. Ramakrishna
- Music: K. V. Mahadevan
- Editing: K. A. Marthand
- Cinematography: Vincent
- Producer: D. Ramanaidu
- Director: K. S. Prakash Rao
- Banner: Suresh Productions
- Release Date: 28 April 1976

== Music ==
Secretary

Film score by K. V. Mahadevan
- Released: 1976
- Genre: Soundtrack
- Length: 27:59
- Label: AVM Audio
- Producer: K. V. Mahadevan

K. V. Mahadevan chronology
Maa Devam (1976)	Secretary (1976)	Magaadu (1976)

Music was composed by K. V. Mahadevan. Lyrics were written by Acharya Aatreya. Music released on AVM Audio Company.

S. No	Song title	Singers	length
1	"Akasamanta Pandiri Vesi"	V. Ramakrishna, P. Susheela	4:22
2	"Chaatu Maatu Samsaramlo"	S. P. Balasubrahmanyam, P. Susheela	3:55
3	"Moratodu Naa Mogudu"	V. Ramakrishna, P. Susheela	4:08
4	"Naa Pakkana"	V. Ramakrishna	4:07
5	"Pedavi Vippalenu"	V. Ramakrishna, P. Susheela	3:46
6	"Netida Oka Naatida"	V. Ramakrishna, P. Susheela	3:53
7	"Manasuleni Bratukoka"	V. Ramakrishna	3:48
