= Magaadu (1976 film) =

- Theatrical release poster
- Directed by: S. D. Lal
- Written by: D. V. Narasa Raju(dialogues)
- Based on: Deewaar by Salim–Javed
- Produced by: Lakshmi Rajyam; Sridhar Rao; Srikanth Nahta
- Starring: N. T. Rama Rao; Manjula; Ramakrishna; Latha
- Cinematography: Srikanth
- Edited by: Veerappa
- Music by: K. V. Mahadevan
- Production company: Rajyam Productions
- Release date: 19 May 1976
- Running time: 151 mins
- Country: India
- Language: Telugu

Magaadu (transl. Man) is a 1976 Indian Telugu-language action drama film produced by Lakshmi Rajyam, Sridhar Rao and Srikanth Nahata and directed by S. D. Lal. The film stars N. T. Rama Rao, Ramakrishna, Manjula and Latha, with music composed by K. V. Mahadevan. It is a remake of the Hindi film Deewaar (1975).

== Cast ==
- N. T. Rama Rao as Vijay Varma
- Rama Krishna as Ravi Varma
- Manjula as Anita
- Latha as Geeta
- Kanta Rao as Anand Babu
- Prabhakar Reddy as Rambabu
- Dhulipala as Police Commissioner
- Rajanala
- Mukkamala as Rahim
- Dr. Sivaramakrishnaiah
- Tyagaraju as Bhujangam
- Raavi Kondala Rao
- K. V. Chalam as Peter
- Malladi
- K. K. Sarma as Gangu
- Anjali Devi as Shanthamma
- Radha Kumari
- Baby Rohini
- Jayamalini as item number

== Soundtrack ==
Magaadu

Film score by K. V. Mahadevan
- Released: 1976
- Genre: Soundtrack
- Length: 12:41
- Producer: K. V. Mahadevan

K. V. Mahadevan chronology
Secretary (1976)	Magaadu (1976)	Bangaru Manishi (1976)

Music composed by K. V. Mahadevan. Lyrics were written by C. Narayana Reddy.

S. No.	Song title	Singers	length
1	"Korukunna Ninnu Cherukunna"	S. P. Balasubrahmanyam, P. Susheela	4:17
2	"Kotesindu"	P. Susheela	4:18
3	"Sala Sala Kaaginakodhi"	S. P. Balasubrahmanyam, P. Susheela	4:06
