= Zanjeer (1973 film) =

1973 Indian film by Prakash Mehra

- Film poster
- Directed by: Prakash Mehra
- Written by: Salim–Javed
- Produced by: Prakash Mehra Productions
- Starring: Amitabh Bachchan; Jaya Bhaduri; Ajit Khan; Pran; Om Prakash
- Cinematography: N. Satyen
- Edited by: R. Mahadik
- Music by: Kalyanji-Anandji
- Production companies: Asha Studios; Chandivali Studio; Filmistan Studio; R.K. Studios; Swati Studios
- Distributed by: Prakash Mehra Productions; Baba Digital Media; Digital Entertainment; Eros Entertainment
- Release date: 11 May 1973
- Running time: 147 minutes
- Country: India
- Language: Hindi

Zanjeer (transl. Shackles) is a 1973 Indian Hindi-language action crime film directed and produced by Prakash Mehra and written by Salim–Javed. The film stars Amitabh Bachchan, Jaya Bhaduri, Pran, Ajit Khan, Om Prakash and Bindu. The music was composed by Kalyanji-Anandji, while cinematography and editing were handled by N. Satyen and R. Mahadik.

Zanjeer was the first of many collaborations between Salim–Javed and Bachchan. Ever since Zanjeer, Salim–Javed wrote many of their subsequent scripts with Bachchan for the lead role and insisted on him being cast for their later films, including blockbusters such as Deewaar and Sholay, establishing Bachchan as a superstar. In addition to being a turning point for Bachchan's career and Hindi cinema, Zanjeer was also a turning point for South Indian cinema, with Bachchan's acting inspiring Rajinikanth. Zanjeer remains an important film in the history of Indian cinema and is regarded as a classic today.

== Plot ==
On Diwali, a young Vijay Khanna witnesses the murder of his parents committed by a man of unknown identity with a white horse on his charm bracelet Zanjeer. Due to this traumatic event, Vijay has recurring nightmares of a white stallion. Even as a child, Vijay stays socially awkward from other kids and believes himself to be alone. 20 years later, Vijay has become an Inspector in a town, where few are honest. Vijay receives complaints about a local man named Sher Khan, who is running gambling dens. When Vijay calls Khan in for questioning, Khan's superiority complex chafes against Vijay's police authority as he scolds the officer, telling him he only orders him around due to his uniform.

Vijay takes him up on his challenge, and meets him in street clothes to fight him. After the fight, Sher Khan not only closes his gambling dens, but has gained respect for Vijay. Sher Khan becomes an auto mechanic and reforms his ways. Various dealings of the crime syndicate continue unabated throughout the town, which traces back to Teja, a crime boss. A mysterious caller continuously calls Vijay to inform him when a crime is about to take place, but hangs up before Vijay can extract any more information from him. When a traffic accident perpetrated by gang members leaves several children dead, a street performer named Mala becomes the witness, where she is bribed by Teja's men to keep quiet.

Mala is questioned by Vijay, who becomes enraged at her and to sway her differently, takes her into the morgue to view the mangled bodies of the children. Mala has a change of heart and asks the money to be donated to an orphanage. Mala identifies the man behind the traffic accident. After learning that Mala has broken her word, Teja's men chases after her through the night. Mala arrives at Vijay's house, desperate for shelter and Vijay allows her to stay. The two discover that they are orphans and discuss the fears associated with living alone. Vijay kindly takes her to his brother and sister-in-law. Under the sister-in-law's tutelage, Mala begins to learn how to keep the house clean as well as learn English.

Eventually, Teja frames Vijay for bribery, who is later suspended and imprisoned for 6 months on false charges. After getting released from prison, Vijay plans to exact revenge, but Mala, who developed feelings for Vijay, begs him to stop being so vengeful. Vijay reluctantly agrees, but soon must come to terms with such a promise. In a Christian cemetery, Vijay encounters the informant who had called him in the past when he was an inspector. The informer named D'Silva appears half-insane, holding onto an empty bottle. D'Silva tells that several years before on Christmas, his three sons drank poisoned moonshine and died from it. Until the killer is found, D'Silva will continue to wander with the bottle. When local criminals mocked him, D'Silva vowed to get back at them by calling the inspector when a crime was about to happen.

After hearing this news, Vijay becomes depressed. Along with a concerted effort by Sher Khan to cheer up Vijay, Mala relents and vows that she will not try to control him and tells him to do what is right. The trail of tainted moonshine leads back to Teja. Upon finally cornering Teja on Diwali, fireworks bursting overhead, Vijay finds out that the person who murdered his parents is Teja after Vijay recognized the Zanjeer on his wrist. Sher Khan helps him to fight Teja and his men, where Vijay takes justice into their own hands until the police arrive. As Teja is being taken into custody, he manages to overpower one of them, snatches their gun and holds Superintendent Singh at gunpoint. Vijay manages to retrieve a dropped pistol from the ground and shoots Teja, who falls dead into the swimming pool. Vijay finds Teja's Zanjeer fallen on the ground and throws it away, freeing him from his lifelong trauma. D'Silva and Vijay exchange a hug before Sher Khan drives off with Mala and Vijay into a new beginning after his arduous quest for justice.

== Cast ==
Actor/Actress	Character/Role	Notes
Amitabh Bachchan	Ex-Inspector Vijay Khanna	Protagonist
Jaya Bhaduri	Mala	
Pran	Sher Khan	
Om Prakash	D'Silva	
Ajit Khan	Seth Dharam Dayal Teja	Antagonist
Bindu	Mona	
Iftekhar	Superintendent of Police Shyam Singh	credited as Iftikhar
Keshto Mukherjee	Gangu	credited as Kesto Mukherji
Randhir	Lala Ashok	Sherkhan's friend – Usurer
Gulshan Bawra	Street Singer	Song Deewane Hain
Sheela Vaz	Street dancer	Song Deewane Hain
Ram Mohan	Kabir	
Yunus Parvez	Constable Saxena	
M. Rajan	Ranjeet (Vijay's father)	
Purnima	Sumitra (Vijay's mother)	
Nandita Thakur	Shanti Bhabhi	
Satyendra Kappu	Police Inspector (Vijay's foster father)	credited as Satyen Kappoo
Ashalata Wabgaonkar	Police Inspector's wife (Vijay's foster mother)	credited as Asha Lata
Ram Sethi	Constable	
Sanjana	Street Dancer	Song Deewane Hain
Amrit Pal	Man offered 'Sher Khan' money to kill	credited as Amrit Paul
Bhushan Tiwari	Smuggler Chirajilal, Teja's man	credited as Bhooshan Tiwari
Javed Khan	Smuggler Anand, Teja's man	credited as Khan
Ranvir Raj	Smuggler Mahendra, Teja's man	credited as Ranbir
Krishan Dhawan	Smuggler Ramakant, Teja's man	credited as Dhawan
Mac Mohan	Man caught in Teja's liquor warehouse	credited as Mack Mohan
D. K. Sapru	Patil	credited as Sapru
Goga Kapoor	Goga	credited as Goga

== Production ==
The story and script were written by Salim Khan. After completing the script, Khan shared the credit with Javed Akhtar as the screenwriting duo Salim–Javed. Zanjeer was written as a crime film with violent action sequences, and the main character Vijay was conceived as a hard-hitting, 'angry with the system' young man. At a time when Hindi cinema was dominated by romance films with "romantic hero" leads, Prakash Mehra saw the script as potentially groundbreaking and came on board as the film's director. However, Salim Khan and Javed Akhtar were struggling to find an actor for the lead, as a number of actors turned down the role of Vijay as it went against their "romantic hero" image; at the time, the industry was dominated by the "King of Romance" Rajesh Khanna and similar "romantic hero" actors. Candidates included Raaj Kumar, Rajesh Khanna, Dharmendra, Dev Anand and Dilip Kumar.

Eventually, the role went to a newcomer, Amitabh Bachchan. Salim-Javed were responsible for discovering and casting Bachchan, who at the time was a "failed newcomer." By the age of 30, had twelve flops and only two hits (as a lead in Bombay to Goa and supporting role in Anand). According to Javed Akhtar, they "saw his talent, which most makers didn’t. He was exceptional, a genius actor who was in films that weren’t good." According to Bachchan, Salim-Javed were close to Rajesh Khanna and could've convinced him to play the role, but they instead opted for the unknown Bachchan. According to Salim Khan, they "strongly felt that Amitabh was the ideal casting for Zanjeer". Bachchan stated "Salim-Javed saw a fight sequence in Bombay to Goa where I was chewing gum throughout the fight as an indicator that I would be the right choice for Zanjeer.” Salim Khan was responsible for introducing Bachchan to Mehra.

For the female lead, Mumtaz was initially offered the role, but she was engaged at the time, and opted out, choosing marriage over career. Jaya Bhaduri, who was engaged to Bachchan at the time, immediately agreed to take the role for the sake of her future husband. For the film's promotion, the posters of Zanjeer initially did not have the names of Salim-Javed on them. Salim-Javed hired a man with a jeep to drive around and paint "Salim-Javed" in stencil font on all the Zanjeer posters from Juhu to Opera House. However, the man was sometimes drunk, which led to him painting "Salim-Javed" on the wrong places, such as Pran's face or Bachchan's hands, for some posters.

== Soundtrack ==
The music was composed by Kalyanji Anandji and the lyrics were written by Prakash Mehra, with the exception of 'Yaari Hai Imaan Mera', which was penned by Gulshan Bawra.

No.	Title	Singer(s)	Length
1.	"Chaaku Chhuriyan Tez Karaa Lo"	Asha Bhosle
2.	"Diljalon Ka Dil Jalaake Kya Milega Dilruba"	Asha Bhosle
3.	"Deewane Hai, Deewanon Ko Na Ghar Chahiye"	Lata Mangeshkar, Mohammed Rafi
4.	"Banaake Kyun Bigaada Re" (Raga Shivaranjani)	Lata Mangeshkar
5.	"Yaari Hai Imaan Mera Yaar Meri Zindagi"	Manna Dey

== Box office ==
With a total domestic Indian gross revenue of ₹6 crore in 1973, including a nett collection of ₹ 3 crore, the film was declared a "Super Hit" according to Box Office India. This was equivalent to a domestic gross of US$7.75 million in 1973, (Note: 7.7420 Indian rupees per US dollar in 1973) or US$56 million (₹ 282 crore) in 2016.

It was also an overseas blockbuster at the Soviet box office, where it drew an audience of 37.3 million viewers in 1980. Its overseas gross in the Soviet Union amounted to 9.325 million Rbls (US$14.58 million, ₹ 11.46 crore), equivalent to US$57 million (₹ 282 crore) in 2016. (Note: Zanjeer in Soviet Union: 9.325 million Rbls (Note: 37.3 million tickets sold, average ticket price of 25 kopecks) (US$14.58 million, (Note: 0.6395 Rbl per US dollar in 1980) ₹ 11.46 crore) (Note: 7.8629 Indian rupees per US dollar in 1980) in 1980 (US$57 million or ₹ 282 crore in 2016)) Worldwide, the film grossed a total of ₹17.46 crore ($22.33 million). Adjusted for inflation, its worldwide gross is equivalent to ₹564 crore ($84 million) in 2016.

== Legacy ==
The term "Angry Young Man" was first used to describe both a new style of Hindi cinema, as well as a new hero archetype, in response to Zanjeer. The film was a striking contrast to romantic films of the period, as it focused on social issues of the early 1970s.

== Awards and nominations ==
21st Filmfare Awards:

Won

- Best Lyricist – Gulshan Bawra for "Yari Hai Imaan Mera"
- Best Story – Salim-Javed
- Best Screenplay – Salim-Javed
- Best Editing – R. Mahadik

Nominated

- Best Film – Prakash Mehra Productions
- Best Actor – Amitabh Bachchan
- Best Supporting Actor – Pran
- Best Music Director – Kalyanji-Anandji
- Best Male Playback Singer – Manna Dey for "Yari Hai Imaan Mera"

== Remakes ==
Year	Film	Language	Cast	Director
1974	Nippulanti Manishi	Telugu	N. T. Rama Rao; Kaikala Satyanarayana; Latha Sethupathi	S. D. Lal
1974	Sirithu Vazha Vendum	Tamil	M. G. Ramachandran; Latha Sethupathi	S. S. Balan
1980	Naayattu	Malayalam	Jayan; Prem Nazir	Sreekumaran Thampi
2013	Zanjeer / Thoofan (Simultaneously shot in Hindi and Telugu)	Hindi	Ram Charan Teja; Priyanka Chopra, Sanjay Dutt, Atul Kulkarni, Prakash Raj, Mahie Gill	Apoorva Lakhia
2013	Zanjeer / Thoofan (Simultaneously shot in Hindi and Telugu)	Telugu	Ram Charan Teja; Priyanka Chopra, Sanjay Dutt, Atul Kulkarni, Prakash Raj, Mahie Gill	Apoorva Lakhia

== See also ==
- Angry Young Men (mini series)
