= Zamana (1985 film) =

1985 Indian film by Ramesh Talwar

- Directed by: Ramesh Talwar
- Story by: Salim Khan; Javed Akhtar
- Produced by: Jagdish C. Sharma
- Starring: Rajesh Khanna; Rishi Kapoor; Poonam Dhillon; Ranjeeta; Gopi Krishna; Om Puri; Avtar Gill; Mac Mohan
- Cinematography: Nadeem Khan
- Edited by: B. Mangeshkar
- Music by: Usha Khanna
- Production company: Veena Pictures
- Release date: 22 February 1985
- Country: India
- Language: Hindi

Zamana (transl. Time, Era or Period) is a 1985 Indian Hindi-language action film. Directed by Ramesh Talwar, the film stars Rajesh Khanna, Rishi Kapoor, Poonam Dhillon, and Ranjeeta, along with Kulbhushan Kharbanda, Om Puri, Girish Karnad, Avtar Gill, Mac Mohan, Satyendra Kapoor from the supporting cast.

The screenplay was written by the screenwriting duo of Salim Khan and Javed Akhtar, also known as "Salim-Javed", who parted ways in 1982.

== Plot ==
The story is about the misunderstandings that develop between the brothers Inspector Vinod Kumar (Rajesh Khanna) and Ravi Kumar (Rishi Kapoor). Their father Satish, a photographer, was murdered when Vinod was 3 years old and his mother Sudha was pregnant with Ravi. When the children grow up, Vinod becomes a police inspector and Ravi becomes a criminal working for a don named J.D. The men fall in love with the same woman, but are reconciled, and Vinod finds his father's killers and convinces his younger brother to leave the world of crime.

== Cast ==
- Rajesh Khanna as Inspector Vinod Kumar
- Rishi Kapoor as Ravi Kumar
- Poonam Dhillon as Sheetal
- Ranjeeta as Geeta
- Kulbhushan Kharbanda as Jogeshwar Dayal "J.D."
- Om Puri as Shyam
- Girish Karnad as Satish Kumar
- Ashalata Wabgaonkar as Sudha
- Gopi Krishna as Latturam
- Mohan Sherry as Sher Singh
- Mac Mohan as Balwant
- Sharat Saxena as Ratan
- Gurbachan Singh as Raghu
- Yunus Parvez as train passenger who helps Sudha
- Avtar Gill as Police Inspector D'Souza
- Satyendra Kapoor as Ramprasad, Sheetal's father

== Soundtrack ==
All lyrics are written by Majrooh Sultanpuri.

No.	Title	Singer(s)	Length
1.	"Rang Chala, Bahar Chali"	Kishore Kumar	6:08
2.	"Ek Baat Hai Humse Kahi Nahin Jaye, Tum Hi Samajh Lo"	Kishore Kumar, Asha Bhosle	5:15
3.	"Galiyat Sankli Sonachi, Ni Porgi Konachi, Galiyat Sankli Sonachi, Ni Porgi Konachi"	Kishore Kumar, Shailendra Singh, Asha Bhosle	6:45
4.	"Kisko Kahe Hum Apna, Logon Ka Woh Khudara""	Kishore Kumar, Mohammed Aziz	5:21
5.	"Nach Na Jane, Kahe Aangan Tedha"	Kishore Kumar, Hariharan	6:54
6.	"Pyare Nandoya"	Kishore Kumar, Sayd Aamirr	5:32
