= Zameen (film) =

Zameen (transl. Land) is the title of several Bollywood films.

== Zameen (2003) ==
An action movie directed by Rohit Shetty, the film is based on the hijacking of Indian Airlines Flight 814 by terrorists. It stars Ajay Devgan, Abhishek Bachchan, and Bipasha Basu. Ajay Devgan plays the character of a soldier who lives by the code and Abhishek Bachchan is an ACP officer. Ram Awana played the role of Akku (one of the four terrorists that hijack the flight).

- Zameen (2003) at IMDb.

== Zameen (1987) ==
This film was directed by Ramesh Sippy and starried Vinod Khanna, Sridevi, Sanjay Dutt, Madhuri Dixit, Rajnikanth and Sujata Mehta in key roles. It was shelved halfway through production when the producers ran out of funds.

== Zameen (1943) ==
This version is a black and white film directed by Anand Kumar and starring Durga Khote

- Zameen (1943) at IMDb

== See also ==
Other films with "Zameen" in title:

- Do Bigha Zameen (1953)
- Do Gaz Zameen Ke Neeche (1972)
- Zameen Aasmaan (1946)
- Zameen Aasmaan (1972)
- Zameen Aasmaan (1984)
- Zameen Ke Tare (1960)
