= Vafadari =

Vafadari is a surname. Notable people with the surname include:

- Arash Vafadari, Iranian businessman
- Karan Vafadari, Zoroastrian Iranian-American businessman
