= Bewafaa =

Bewafaa may refer to:

- Bewafa (1952 film), a Hindi film
- Bewafaa (2005 film), a Hindi film
- Bewafa Sanam, a 1995 Hindi film
- "Bewafa" (song), by Dutch-Pakistani singer, rapper, and songwriter Imran Khan

== See also ==
- Bewafa (1952 film), 1952 Indian film
- Bewafa (TV series), Pakistani television series
