= Kabzaa (1988 film) =

1988 film directed by Mahesh Bhatt

- Theatrical release poster
- Directed by: Mahesh Bhatt
- Written by: Salim Khan
- Produced by: Nanabhai Bhatt
- Starring: Raj Babbar; Sanjay Dutt; Paresh Rawal; Amrita Singh; Dimple Kapadia; Alok Nath; Anupam Kher
- Cinematography: Nadeem Khan
- Edited by: Dimpy Bahl
- Music by: Rajesh Roshan
- Production company: Vishesh Films
- Release date: 20 May 1988
- Running time: 143 minutes
- Country: India
- Language: Hindi

Kabzaa (transl. Possession) is a 1988 Indian Hindi-language action crime film, written by Salim Khan and directed by Mahesh Bhatt starring Raj Babbar, Dimple Kapadia, Sanjay Dutt, Amrita Singh, Paresh Rawal, Alok Nath, and Anupam Kher in lead roles. The story of the 1998 Indian film Ghulam was inspired by this film.

== Plot ==
Ravi Verma, a careless boy, lives with his elder brother Ranjeet Verma. Ranjeet is a lawyer and works for Veljibhai Soda, who is a criminal. Veljibhai has an order to forcefully acquire a land which belongs to a freedom fighter Ustad Ali Mohammed. Ali wants to build up a children's park at that site. Ravi somehow gets into the picture and Veljibhai asks him to go there and warn Ali to leave the land immediately. Ravi is suffering from brain tumor and while throwing things out of Ali's house, he falls on the floor. Ali takes him to the hospital.

When Ravi gains consciousness, he realises that he had been doing wrong and changes his mind. He realises his duties and now wants to save Ali's land at any cost from Veljibhai. Veljibhai, on realising this, takes the onus upon himself to capture the land in his own hands. He gets Ali killed in the process. Ali has handed over the ownership of land to Ravi in his deed. Veljibhai asks Ravi to hand over the deed papers in ransom for his brother, Ranjeet. Ranjeet however tries to get the papers back but is killed by Veljibhai. Now Ravi has everything to go against Veljibhai and not let his plans succeed. But Veljibhai is clever enough to kidnap his love Rita. Ravi rescues Rita and kills Veljibhai not before he is shot with four bullets, but saves himself by crawling towards phone booth to call ambulance. The ambulance arrives and in the hospital, Ravi is saved, along with the removal of his brain tumor. He gets the children's park built in Ali's land as per his last wish.

== Cast ==
- Raj Babbar as Ranjeet Verma
- Sanjay Dutt as Ravi Verma
- Dimple Kapadia as Dr. Smita
- Amrita Singh as Rita
- Aloknath as Ustad Ali Mohammed
- Paresh Rawal as Veljibhai Soda
- Anupam Kher as Daaga
- Avtar Gill as Police Inspector
- Tiku Talsania as Drunk man in the restaurant
- Disco Shanti as Dancer

== Soundtrack ==
The music was composed by Rajesh Roshan and the songs were written by Anand Bakshi.

Song	Singer
"Tumse Mile Bin Chain Nahin Aata, Main Kya Karun"	Kishore Kumar, Anupama Deshpande
"Ae Mere Dil" - 1	Mohammed Aziz
"Ae Mere Dil" - 2	Mohammed Aziz
"Ae Mere Dil" - 3	Mohammed Aziz
"Ae Mere Dil" - 4	Mohammed Aziz
"Dil Ki Adalat, Pyar Ka Muqadma"	Mohammed Aziz, Sadhana Sargam
"Heere Motiyon Se"	Asha Bhosle
