= Immaan Dharam =

1977 Indian film by Desh Mukherjee

- Poster
- Directed by: Desh Mukherjee
- Written by: Salim–Javed
- Produced by: Premji; Suchitra Films Pvt. Ltd.
- Starring: Shashi Kapoor; Sanjeev Kumar; Amitabh Bachchan; Rekha; Aparna Sen; Helen; Prem Chopra
- Cinematography: Nariman A. Irani
- Edited by: Das Dhaimade
- Music by: Laxmikant–Pyarelal
- Distributed by: Bombino Video Pvt. Ltd.
- Release date: January 14, 1977
- Country: India
- Language: Hindi

Immaan Dharam (transl. Belief and Duty) is a 1977 Hindi-language action drama film directed by Desh Mukherjee and written by Salim–Javed. The film stars Amitabh Bachchan, Shashi Kapoor, and Sanjeev Kumar. Other cast members included Rekha, Aparna Sen, Helen and Prem Chopra. The music is by Laxmikant–Pyarelal. In the film, Bachchan and Kapoor play two con men who earn money by giving false testimony in court, until their conscience catches up with them.

The film was a commercial and critical failure, despite its star-studded cast. A 2015 review in The Hindu said "the narrative stutters and eventually falls flat" due to its "mediocre plot" and "an overwhelming predictabilty about the story".

== Plot ==
This is a story about Ahmed and Mohan, who act as mock witnesses and always hang around court to give evidence as per the requirement of a case. This changes when they meet and are influenced by Kabir Das, and decide to go straight. But they soon feel that it's virtually impossible to earn a living as honest citizens. Meanwhile, Kabir Das is arrested for a murder he claims he did not commit, and the duo promise to help him, and find out who the real killer is, but they end up getting in trouble themselves.

== Cast ==
- Shashi Kapoor as Mohan Saxena
- Sanjeev Kumar as Kabir Das
- Amitabh Bachchan as Ahmed Raza
- Rekha as Durga
- Aparna Sen as Shyamlee
- Helen as Jenny Francis
- Prem Chopra as Ranjeet
- Om Shivpuri as Seth Jamna Das
- Shreeram Lagoo as Govinda Anna
- Utpal Dutt as Retired Major Balvir Singh
- Amrish Puri as Dharam Dayal
- A. K. Hangal as Masterji (Shyamlee's Father)
- M. B. Shetty as Kargah
- Sudhir as Gupta
- Raj Kishore as Munshi
- C. S. Dubey as Lawyer (Gullu Miya's Case)
- Mac Mohan as False Witness
- Baby Rani as Pinky Francis
- Jagdish Raj as Police Inspector
- Satyan Kappu as Prosecuting Lawyer (Jamna Das' Case)
- Pinchoo Kapoor as Kabir's Lawyer
- Sajjan as Lawyer (Jenny's Case)
- Gajanan Jagirdar as Barkat Chacha

== Crew ==
- Director - Desh Mukherjee
- Writer - Salim–Javed
- Producer - J. N. Manchanda, Premji
- Production Company - Suchitra Films Pvt. Ltd.
- Editor - Das Dhaimade
- Cinematographer - Nariman A. Irani
- Art Director - Marutirao V. Kale
- Stunts - Kodi S. Irani, M. B. Shetty
- Costume and Wardrobe - Dhanji Mistry, Keshav Rao
- Choreographer - P. L. Raj
- Music Director - Laxmikant–Pyarelal
- Lyricist - Anand Bakshi
- Playback Singers - Mohammed Rafi, Asha Bhosle, Mahendra Kapoor, Kishore Kumar, Lata Mangeshkar, Mukesh.

== Music ==
Song title	Singers	Time
"Duniya Ek Adalat Hai"	Kishore Kumar, Mohammed Rafi	3:50
"Hum Jhooth Bolte Hain"	Kishore Kumar, Mohammed Rafi	6:15
"Ae Kaash Main Dekh Sakti"	Lata Mangeshkar	5:55
"Kuncham Kuncham"	Mukesh, Mahendra Kapoor, Asha Bhosle	8:30
"O Jatta Aai Baisakhi"	Mohammed Rafi, Mukesh	4:35
