= Adhikar (1971 film) =

- Directed by: S. M. Sagar
- Screenplay by: Salim–Javed (uncredited)
- Story by: R. S. Verma
- Produced by: Ashok Kumar
- Starring: Ashok Kumar; Nanda; Deb Mukherjee; Nazima; Pran
- Narrated by: S.Noor
- Cinematography: P. Isaac
- Edited by: Wamanrao
- Music by: R. D. Burman
- Release date: 28 April: 1971
- Country: India
- Language: Hindi

Adhikar is a 1971 Indian Hindi-language drama film, directed by S.M. Sagar and written by Salim–Javed. The film stars Ashok Kumar, Nanda and Deb Mukherjee in the main roles.

== Cast ==
- Ashok Kumar as Barrister Shukla
- Nanda as Meera
- Deb Mukherjee as Shyam
- Nazima as Radha
- Pran as Shikari Banne Khan Bhopali
- Raj Mehra as Shiv Charan Sharma
- Ratnamala as Parvati Sharma
- Rajnish as Rajan Shukla
- Kishen Mehta as Dr. Kailash
- Shivraj as Doctor
- Brahmachari as Deepak
- Shammi as Rajan's Mother
- Tabassum as Rekha Shukla
- Helen as Dancer
- Kundan as Shankar
- Lata Arora as Shanti

== Soundtrack ==
Lyrics were provided by Ramesh Pant.

Song	Singer
"Koi Mane Ya Na Mane, Jo Kal Tak The Anjane"	Kishore Kumar, Asha Bhosle
"Rekha O Rekha"	Mohammed Rafi
"Jeena To Hai Usi Ka"	Mohammed Rafi
"Fashion Ki Deewani"	Manna Dey
"Tum To Sabke Ho Rakhwale"	Asha Bhosle
"Sharaab Nahin Hoon"	Asha Bhosle
