= Ramesh Sippy =

Indian filmmaker

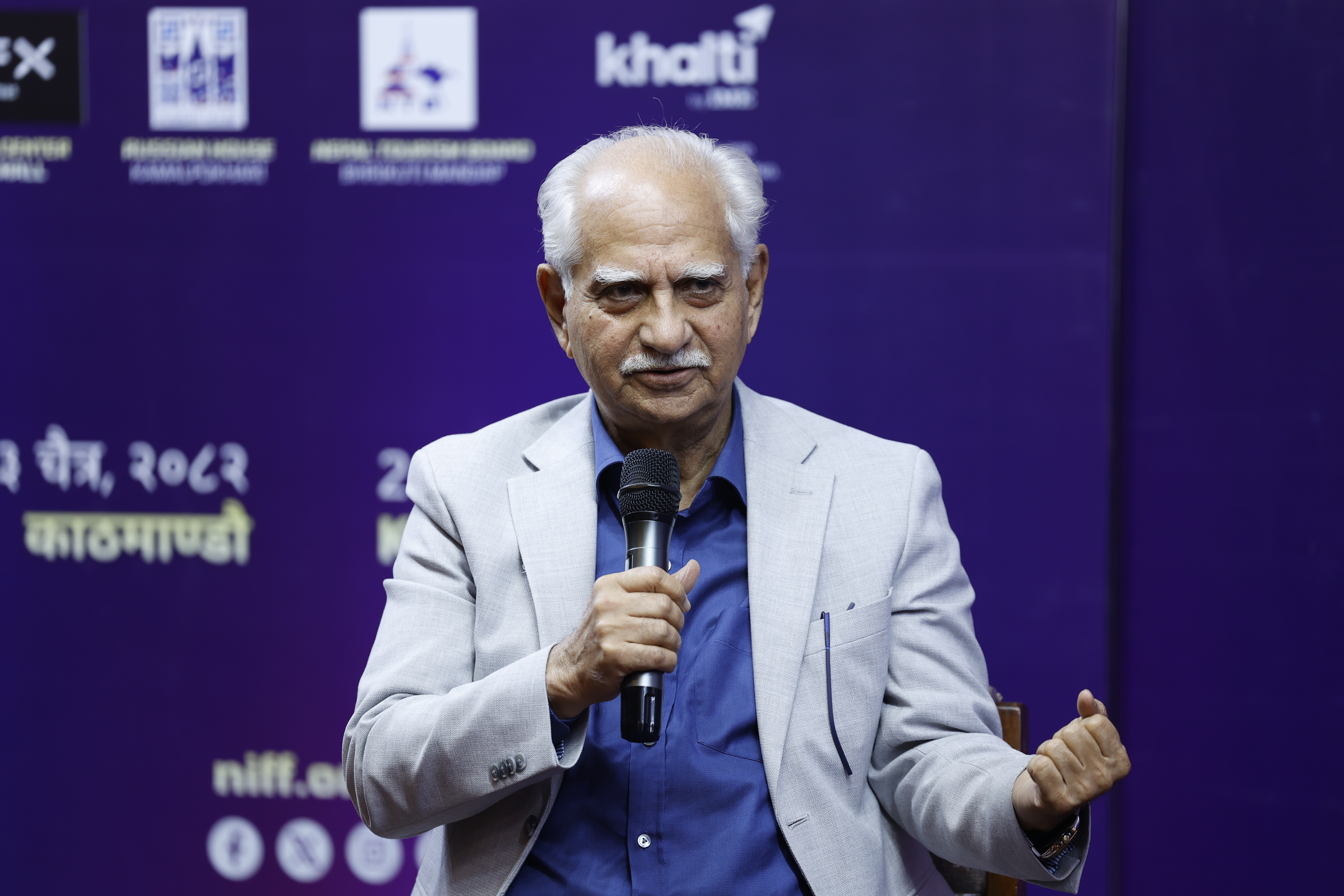
- Ramesh Sippy at 9th edition of Nepal International Film Festival
- Born: Ramesh Sipahimalani; Karachi, Sind, British India
- Occupations: Film director; film producer; actor
- Organization(s): Ramesh Sippy Academy of Cinema & Entertainment
- Spouse(s): Geeta Sippy (divorced) Kiran Juneja (m. 1991)
- Children: Sheena Sippy, Rohan Sippy, Sonya Sippy Sondhi
- Parents: G. P. Sippy (father); Mohini Sippy (mother)
- Relatives: Kapoor family
- Family: Sippy family
- Honors: Padma Shri (2013)

Ramesh Sippy is an Indian film director, actor and producer in Hindi cinema. He is particularly known for being the director of Sholay (1975), often regarded as one of the most influential films ever made in India. The Government of India honoured him with Padma Shri in 2013. In 2017, he founded the Ramesh Sippy Academy of Cinema & Entertainment in Mumbai.

== Personal life ==
Ramesh Sippy is the son of producer G. P. Sippy. Ramesh Sippy married Kiran Juneja in 1991.

He was previously married to Geeta, with whom he has three children. His son Rohan Sippy is a film director. His daughter Sheena was married to Shashi Kapoor's son, Kunal Kapoor, until they divorced in 2004. Their son, Zahan Kapoor, is an actor working in Hindi films and theater plays.

== Career ==
Ramesh Sippy visited the sets of the film Sazaa, his father's first film, when he was 6 years old. His first film job came at age nine, when he played Achala Sachdev's son in the 1953 film Shahenshah. He worked in both the production and direction departments in Johar-Mehmood in Goa and Mere Sanam produced by his father. He worked as an assistant for seven years before becoming the director of Andaz (1971) starring Shammi Kapoor, Hema Malini and Rajesh Khanna which was a huge box office success. His second film Seeta Aur Geeta (1972) featuring Hema Malini in dual roles was also hugely successful and propelled her to superstardom

In 1975 Ramesh Sippy directed the film Sholay featuring Dharmendra, Amitabh Bachchan, Sanjeev Kumar, Hema Malini, Jaya Bhaduri and Amjad Khan in a now iconic role of the dacoit Gabbar Singh. After a slow start the box office, the film eventually became one of the biggest blockbusters in Bollywood history. Sholay remains one of the most iconic films in Hindi film history.

None of his later films were able to match the stupendous success of Sholay which was a tribute to the Westerns. His next film Shaan (1980) which was inspired by the James Bond genre of films remained a moderate success. Shakti (1982) brought together veteran actor Dilip Kumar and the reigning superstar Amitabh Bachchan in Shakti. The moderately successful film did win the Filmfare Best Movie Award. In 1985, he directed Saagar, starring Rishi Kapoor, Kamal Haasan and marked Dimple Kapadia's comeback to films after 12 years since her debut in Bobby.

Ramesh Sippy directed the successful television serial Buniyaad which focused on the Partition of India and was aired on Indian television channel Doordarshan from 1986 to 1987. The next three films he directed, Bhrashtachar (1989), Akayla (1991), and Zamana Deewana (1995) were box office flops. He did not direct any film for 20 years after that. In 2015, he returned to directing with Shimla Mirchi, a comedy film starring Rajkummar Rao, Rakul Preet Singh and Hema Malini. The film had difficulty attracting buyers and remained unreleased until January 2020 when it was finally released on Netflix.

His string of hits with Amitabh Bachchan made him one of the golden directors who had a special working relationship with the actor along with Yash Chopra, Prakash Mehra, Manmohan Desai, and Hrishikesh Mukherjee. In 2005 he received the Filmfare Best Film of 50 Years award for Sholay.

Ramesh Sippy has produced several films directed by his son Rohan Sippy, such as Kuch Naa Kaho (2003), Bluffmaster (2005) and Dum Maro Dum (2011). In 2006 he also produced Taxi No. 9211 which was directed by Milan Luthria. In 2008-09 he produced Kunaal Roy Kapur's The President is Coming and the Akshay Kumar-Deepika Padukone film, Chandni Chowk to China, directed by Nikhil Advani.

== Awards and honours ==
- Filmfare Best Film of 50 Years for Sholay in 2005
- IIFA Award for outstanding contribution to the Indian cinema (Male) in 2012
- Padma Shri in 2013
- Filmfare Lifetime Achievement Award in 2020.

== Filmography ==
Year	Title	Role	Notes
1968	Brahmachari	Producer	
1971	Andaz	Director	
1972	Seeta Aur Geeta	Director	
1975	Sholay	Director	
1978	Trishna	Producer	
1980	Shaan	Director	
1982	Shakti	Director	
1985	Saagar	Director	
1987	Zameen	Director	Incomplete/ Unreleased
1989	Bhrashtachar	Director	
1991	Akayla	Director	
1995	Zamana Deewana	Director	
2003	Kuch Naa Kaho	Producer	
2005	Bluffmaster!	Producer	
2006	Taxi No. 9211	Producer	
2007	Fear	Producer	
2008	The President is Coming	Producer	
2009	Chandni Chowk to China	Producer	
2011	Dum Maaro Dum	Producer	
2013	Nautanki Saala	Producer	
2014	Sonali Cable	Producer	
2020	Shimla Mirchi	Director	Delayed release; Filmed in 2014

=== Television ===
- Buniyaad (1986–1987)
- Gaatha (1997–1998)

== Awards ==
Year	Award	Category	Film	Result
1976	Filmfare Awards	Best Director	Sholay	Nominated
1983	Filmfare Awards	Best Director	Shakti	Nominated
1986	Filmfare Awards	Best Director	Saagar	Nominated
2005	Filmfare Awards	Best Film of 50 Years	Sholay	Won

== See also ==
- Angry Young Men (mini series)
