= Don (franchise) =

Indian media franchise

- 1978 film logo
- Created by: Salim–Javed
- Original work: Don (1978)
- Years: 1978-present

Print publications
- Comics: Don; Don: The Origin

Films and television
- Films: Don (1978); Don (2006); Don 2 (2011); Don 3 (TBA)

Games
- Video games: Don – The Social Mobsters Game; Don 2: The Game; Don 2: The Pursuit; Don 2: Prison Break; Don 2: Eliminate Vardhan

Audio
- Soundtracks: Don; Don: The Chase Begins Again; Don 2

Don is an Indian Hindi-language media franchise, centered on Don, a fictional Indian underworld boss. The franchise originates from the 1978 Hindi-language action thriller film Don. Due to pan India films not being the norm in those days, separate remakes such as Yugandhar (1979), Billa (1980) and Shobhraj (1986) were released in South Indian languages. In 2006, the franchisee was rebooted, with the release of Don: The Chase Begins Again. Its sequel was released in 2011, titled Don 2. A second sequel, Don 3, has been announced. It has also been expanded to comics and video games. The reboot series also had South Indian remakes such as the Tamil films Billa (2007) and Billa II (2012) and the Telugu film Billa (2009).

The original film was written by Salim–Javed (Salim Khan and Javed Akhtar), directed by Chandra Barot, and starred Amitabh Bachchan in the title role. The remake series was created by Javed Akhtar and his son Farhan Akhtar, with Shah Rukh Khan starring in the title role. Other actors who have played the character include N. T. Rama Rao in Yugandhar (1979), Rajinikanth in Billa (1980), Mohanlal in Shobhraj (1986), Ajith Kumar in Billa (2007) and Billa II (2012) and Prabhas in Billa (2009). Don is one of the highest-grossing Indian film franchises.

The 1991 Pakistani film Cobra also draws inspiration from Don.

== Overview ==
=== Don (1978) ===
Don, a wanted criminal, succumbs to his injuries in a police chase. Things take a turn when Vijay, a lookalike of Don, hired by DCP D'Silva, replaces him and tries to trace the details of his illegal activities.

=== Don (2006) ===
Vijay, a lookalike of criminal kingpin Don, is hired by DCP D'Silva in order to find Don's secrets. But after D'Silva dies, Vijay struggles to reveal his real identity.

=== Don 2 (2011) ===
After dominating the Asian underworld, Don sets his eyes on the European criminal market. Caught between the Berlin mafia and law enforcement, Don tries to escape treachery and betrayal.

== Films ==
| Film | Release date | Director | Screenwriter(s) | Story by | Producer(s) |
|---|---|---|---|---|---|
| Don | 12 May 1978 | Chandra Barot | Salim–Javed | Salim–Javed | Nariman Irani |
| Don: The Chase Begins Again | 20 October 2006 | Farhan Akhtar | Javed Akhtar, Farhan Akhtar | Remake of Don (1978) | Ritesh Sidhwani, Farhan Akhtar |
| Don 2:The King Is Back | 23 December 2011 | Farhan Akhtar | Farhan Akhtar, Ameet Mehta, Amrish Shah | Farhan Akhtar, Ameet Mehta, Amrish Shah | Farhan Akhtar, Ritesh Sidhwani, Shah Rukh Khan |
| Don 3 | TBA | Farhan Akhtar | Farhan Akhtar, Pushkar-Gayathri | Farhan Akhtar, Pushkar-Gayathri | Farhan Akhtar, Ritesh Sidhwani |

=== Don (1978) ===
The first installment of the series, centers on the fictional incidents. Don, a wanted criminal, succumbs to his injuries in a police chase. Things take a turn when Vijay, a lookalike of Don, replaces him and tries to trace the details of his illegal activities. Don was released on 12 May 1978, and gained positive response. The film grossed ₹7 crore ($8.6 million). Adjusted for inflation, its box office gross is equivalent to $42 million (₹218 crore) in 2016. It was the third highest-grossing Indian film of 1978, and was classified a golden jubilee by Box Office India.

=== Don (2006) ===
Don is a reboot of the 1978 film of the same name, and follows the titular criminal's look-alike who has been sent on a clandestine mission to impersonate Don after he is wounded in a chase, and to infiltrate the plans of the drug mafia. The film was titled as Don, but then changed to Don: The Chase Begins Again and also the second installment in this series. The film is directed by Farhan Akhtar and produced by Javed Akhtar, Farhan Akhtar. The film stars Shah Rukh Khan, Priyanka Chopra, Arjun Rampal, Isha Koppikar in lead roles and Kareena Kapoor in a cameo role. This was Chopra's first action role, and she was excited to the part, so she wanted to do all the stunts by herself. Don was released worldwide on 20 October 2006 in 800 screens during the Diwali festive season, clashing with another Bollywood film Jaan-E-Mann. The film opened to excellent to very good response at the domestic box-office, with an occupancy of 90%.Mayank Shekhar from Mumbai Mirror gave the film a rating of 4 out of 5 and wrote, "The former was a character-driven, intimate film, albeit a fairly slick thriller, mostly for its screenplay." The film grossed over ₹7100 million in India, becoming the fifth highest-grossing Indian film of 2006, and was deemed a "hit." It also grossed over $7.8 million in the overseas territories and was declared a blockbuster. Worldwide, the film grossed over ₹1.06 billion (US$11 million) and was a major commercial success. The Home media was distributed by T-Series Home Entertainment domestically and Internationally by UTV, the film was released on DVDs on 5 December 2006. The Blu-ray version was released on 27 April 2011.

=== Don 2 (2011) ===
A sequel, Don 2, was commissioned after the success of the previous film and was also directed by Akhtar, with both Khan and Priyanka reprising their roles and Lara Dutta in a cameo role. The film's story takes place five years after the previous film when Don, a powerful and ruthless crime boss, plans to take over the European drug cartel. Meanwhile, Roma (Priyanka Chopra) has joined the Interpol to hunt him down. Don 2 was released worldwide 23 December 2011 on 3,105 screens in the domestic market, including 500 prints in 3D, and on 650 screens in 40 countries. The dubbed versions in Telugu and Tamil were released with the Hindi version. It received mixed to positive reviews from critics. As of June 2020, the film holds a 69% approval rating on review aggregator site Rotten Tomatoes, based on thirteen reviews, with an average rating of 6.68 out of 10. On its first day, Don 2 had 80-percent occupancy levels throughout India. In multiplexes its occupancy level was 75%-80% percent and 70%–75% in single-screen theatres. The film grossed ₹147 million (US$1.5 million) from its Hindi version, in the process becoming the third-highest opening-day grossing Indian film (fourth-highest for the Hindi version) and the highest opening-day grossing film on a non-holiday Friday. The second-week total of Don 2 was the second-highest of 2011, after Ready. By the end of its theatrical run the Hindi version of Don 2 grossed ₹1.06 billion (US$11 million) in India and regional versions added a further ₹60 million for a grand total of ₹1.12 billion (US$12 million) including Tamil and Telugu, making it the highest-grossing Bollywood film of 2011. It grossed $11.24 million on the overseas market and was the third highest-grossing Bollywood film overseas at that time, after My Name Is Khan and 3 Idiots.

=== Don 3 (TBA) ===
A reboot, Don 3 was announced in 2023 by Excel Entertainment, with Ranveer Singh in the title role alongside actress Kriti Sanon, replacing Kiara Advani, who was originally roped in for the lead role but left the film following her pregnancy. In January 2025, Vikrant Massey was confirmed to play the main villain. But by 2026, Singh reportedly walked out of the film, citing creative disagreements.

== Characters ==
=== Vijay ===
The protagonist of the 1978 original film, Vijay is a slum-dwelling simpleton trying to survive in the hustle and bustle of Bombay in order to support two small foster children. Vijay, the exact lookalike of Don, is trained by D’Silva to impersonate Don and place him back into the crime nexus, but this time as a police informer. A talented singer and joyful enthusiast of paan (betel-leaf), Vijay struggles to prove his real identity and innocence after the death of D'Silva, the only one who knew about Vijay's undercover operation. When subjected to pressure, Vijay steps up and proves himself to be a force to be reckoned with, defeating Vardhaan's henchmen on multiple occasions before teaming up with Roma and Jasjit to provide the police with a diary that served as proof of Vijay's innocence and Vardhaan's true identity.

In the remake, Vijay's character is similar to the one featured in the original. However, after being hired by D'Silva to serve as an informant, Vijay is killed by Don, who then takes his place.

=== Roma ===
A simple girl from town, Roma hates Don because he killed her brother Ramesh and his fiancée (her best friend) Kamini. In order to get revenge, Roma trains herself up and joins Don's gang with a secret desire to kill him. Unaware that the real Don is dead, she fights Vijay (who is then masquerading as Don). But when she learns the truth, she befriends him.

In Don: The Chase Begins Again, she discovers that Don is still alive and continues to hate him. Her pursuit for Don continues in its sequel where she joins the Interpol. In reboot Don, she falls for Vijay but by the end of the movie realizes he is real Don. In the sequel, she wants to seek revenge for his betrayal but when Vardhaan and Abdul Jabbar (a character played by Nawwab Shah in Don 2) ask her to shoot Don or get shot herself, she chooses the latter indicating that she still has a soft corner for him.

=== Jasjit ===
A circus entertainer who used to work with Narang in the past, Jasjit (a.k.a. "JJ") is hired by Narang for one last heist. JJ refuses but is forced to accept because he needs money for his wife's medical treatment. He is arrested by DSP D'Silva, leading to his wife's death and leaving his children, Munni and Deepu, without a guardian until Vijay finds them and takes care of them. After his release from prison, JJ tries to kill D'Silva, but spares him when D'Silva offers to reunite JJ with his children. While waiting for D'Silva, JJ acquires a diary in the DSP's possession that contained information about Vardhaan's organisation. JJ attempts to trade the diary with Vardhaan in exchange for money, but finds Munni and Deepun (who were taken by Vardhaan as a leverage against Vijay) and rescues them, eventually teaming up with Vijay and Roma to take down Vardhaan.

In the remake, Jasjit is a security software worker hired by an unknown assistant to pull off a heist. Trapped and forced to accept because his wife is kidnapped, Jasjit's story is similar to the one featured in the original.

=== D'Silva ===
The local DSP who was assigned the duty of capturing Don. He does succeed in capturing Don, but the latter dies in the process. However, only he knows of Don's death, so he secretly hires Vijay, a look-alike of Don, and advises him to disguise as Don and give the police information about Don's gang. He is the only one who knows Vijay's secret. Vijay succeeds, but he is killed, leaving Vijay on his own to prove his innocence.

In the reboot series, D'Silva survives and reveals himself to be Vardhaan.

=== Anita ===
Don's girlfriend. She, like the rest of Don's gang, is unaware that Vijay is acting as their leader who is dead. Because Vijay is attracted to Roma instead of Anita, the latter feels jealous, and eventually overhears Vijay's phone conversation with D'Silva, thus finding out the truth. Vijay however quickly manages to trap her, thus saving himself.

In the 2006 remake, she is implied to be aware of Don's plans, rendezvousing with him at the end of the film.

=== Vardhaan ===
The real underworld boss, higher than Don. Vardhan masquerades himself as Interpol officer R. K. Malik. In the end, his truth is revealed and he is captured by police.

In the remake, Vardhan masquerades himself as DCP D'Silva, and his identity is not known to anyone except his gang members who pretend to be against him. Eventually, Singhania finds out that D'Silva is actually Vardhan, but is killed before the news can reach anyone. Vardhan, who knows that Vijay is not Don, reveals himself to Vijay, who eventually manages to defeat Vardhan and get him arrested. Vardhan returns in the sequel, playing an important role. He seeks revenge against Don for putting him behind bars from the previous film but Don makes a deal with him and both of them break out of prison. He and Don assemble a team to steal the euro-printing plates from J. K. Diwan (Alyy Khan) but turns on Don and is once again defeated by him and placed back in prison.

=== Malik ===
R. K. Malik is the Interpol officer. His identity is stolen by Vardhaan, who then works with DSP D'Silva. Vardhaan eventually betrays D'Silva by killing him, but not before revealing himself.

In reboot Don, Malik (now named Vishal Malik) is not Vardhaan. He later becomes an ally of Vijay (who, unbeknownst to him, is actually Don). In Don 2, he gives Roma the duty of capturing Don.

=== Singhania ===
A new character created exclusively for the remake, Singhania is a former lieutenant of the criminal Boris. He is Don's boss until he is killed by his rival Vardhaan (the other lieutenant of Boris) in Don: The Chase Begins Again. He appears only briefly in the films.

=== Boris ===
Another new character created exclusively for the remake of the original film.

Boris was the kingpin even higher Vardhaan and Singhania. He was the boss of Vardhaan and Singhania until he was killed by Singhania who took over his business when he wanted to give it to Vardhaan.

=== Cast members, main, recurring, and supporting characters ===
This table lists the main characters who appear in the Don franchise.

| Character | Film | | |
| Character | Don (1978) | Don (2006) | Don 2 (2011) |
|---|---|---|---|
| Mark "Don" Donald | Amitabh Bachchan | Shah Rukh Khan | Shah Rukh Khan |
| Vijay Pal | Amitabh Bachchan | Shah Rukh Khan | |
| Roma Bhagat | Zeenat Aman | Priyanka Chopra | Priyanka Chopra |
| Vardhaan Makhija | Om Shivpuri | Boman Irani | Boman Irani |
| Jasjit "JJ" Ahuja | Pran | Arjun Rampal | |
| Narang Singh | Kamal Kapoor | Pavan Malhotra | |
| Anita | Arpana Choudhary | Isha Koppikar | |
| Kamini | Helen | Kareena Kapoor (cameo) | |
| Munni | Baby Bilkish | | |
| Deepu Ahuja | Alankar Joshi | Tanay Chheda | |
| Ramesh Bhagat | Sharad Kumar | Diwakar Pundir (cameo) | |
| DCP D'Silva | Iftekhar | Boman Irani (impostor) | |
| Inspector Suresh Verma | Satyendra Kapoor | | |
| Interpol officer R. K. Malik | Om Shivpuri (impostor), Pinchoo Kapoor (real) | | |
| Interpol officer Vishal Malik | | Om Puri | Om Puri |
| Singhania | | Rajesh Khattar | Rajesh Khattar |
| Ayesha Kapoor | | | Lara Dutta |
| Sameer Ali | | | Kunal Kapoor |
| Interpol officer Brij Baruah | | | Boman Irani (impostor) |
| J. K. Diwan | | | Alyy Khan |
| Arjun Shergill | | | Sahil Shroff |
| Jens Berkel | | | Florian Lukas |
| Abdul Jabbar | | | Nawab Shah |
| Yana Ali | | | Rike Schmid |

== Additional crew and production details ==
| Occupation | Film | | |
| Occupation | Don (1978) | Don (2006) | Don 2 (2011) |
|---|---|---|---|
| Director | Chandra Barot | Farhan Akhtar | Farhan Akhtar |
| Producer(s) | Nariman A. Irani | Ritesh Sidhwani; Farhan Akhtar | Ritesh Sidhwani; Farhan Akhtar; Shahrukh Khan |
| Writer(s) | Salim–Javed | Javed Akhtar; Farhan Akhtar | Farhan Akhtar; Ameet Mehta; Amrish Shah |
| Music | Kalyanji Anandji | Shankar–Ehsaan–Loy | Shankar–Ehsaan–Loy |
| Cinematography | Nariman Irani | K. U. Mohanan | Jason West |
| Editor(s) | Wamanrao | Neil Sadwelkar; Anand Subaya | Anand Subaya; Ritesh Soni |
| Production Companies | Nariman Films | Excel Entertainment | Excel Entertainment, Red Chillies Entertainment |
| Distributing Companies | —N/a | UTV Motion Pictures, Eros International | Reliance Entertainment |
| Running Time | 166 minutes | 169 minutes | 144 minutes |

== Release and revenue ==
| Film | Date | Lang. | Box office gross revenue | | | Budget |
| Film | Date | Lang. | India | Overseas | Worldwide | Budget |
|---|---|---|---|---|---|---|
| Don | 20 Apr 1978 | Hindi | ₹70 million | —N/a | ₹70 million ($8.6 million) | ₹7 million ($860,000) |
| Don: The Chase Begins Again | 20 Oct 2006 | Hindi | ₹775 million | $7.88 million | ₹1.132 billion ($25 million) | ₹380 million ($8.4 million) |
| Don 2 | 23 Dec 2011 | Hindi | ₹1.44 billion | $11.7 million | ₹2.06 billion ($44.14 million) | ₹850 million ($17 million) |
| Billa | 14 Dec 2007 | Tamil | ? | ? | ₹500 million ($11.04 million) | ? |
| Billa | 3 Apr 2009 | Telugu | ? | ? | ₹260 million ($5.8 million) | ? |
| Billa II | 13 Jul 2012 | Tamil | ₹430 million | ? | ₹1 billion ($19 million) | ₹400 million ($7.41 million) |
| Total | —N/a | —N/a | ₹2.715 billion | $19.58 million | ₹5.022 billion ($113.58 million) | ₹1.637 billion ($33.67 million) |

== Reception ==
The original Don was a blockbuster. It won a few awards.

- Amitabh Bachchan won a Filmfare Award for Best Actor.
- Asha Bhosle won a Filmfare Award, for the song "Yeh Mera Dil".
- Kishore Kumar won a Filmfare Award, for the song "Khaike Paan Banaraswala".

Mumbai Mirror's Mayank Shekhar gave the remake a rating of 3 out of 5. He criticised the treatment of certain scenes in comparison to the original.

The remake of the film in 2006 was titled the same Don, was a hit. The sequel to the 2006 film was released in 2011 as Don 2 and it was also a hit.

== Comic books ==
=== Don ===
Don, an 80-page comic book was published for the 2006 film.

=== Don: The Origin ===
In October 2011 a comic book based on Don 2, Don: The Origin, was published in Mumbai. A prequel, it details Don's past. About the comic, Ritesh Sidhwani said: "Don 2 takes off from where Don: The Chase Begins Again left off. In these five years, many have forgotten the film and must be curious to know how Don came into being. This original story will help them understand him and also offer a background on other characters like Roma and Vardhaan."

== Games ==
=== Don – The Social Mobsters Game ===
Excel Entertainment collaborated with India's largest video-game company, Gameshastra, on a console game. The firm developed a third-person action-adventure console game in which the player performs actions similar to Don's in the film. A social game, Don – The Social Mobsters Game (developed by Mango Games), was launched on Facebook. It is available on Android and PSN for PlayStation 3 platforms. Sidhwani said, "This is the first time that a game based on an Indian film will be launched on four platforms. For an iconic character like Don, I think this was the best way to keep the hysteria going amongst his fans."

=== Don 2: The King is Back ===
A PlayStation 2 game, Don 2: The King is Back, was released in India in February 2013 as the final PAL game for PS2.

=== Mobile games ===
Mobile video games based on Don 2 were also made as tie-ins during its release by Fugu Mobile, including Don 2: The Pursuit (a racing game), Don 2: Prison Break and Don 2: Eliminate Vardhan.

== Other Indian language remakes ==
Don has a number of South Indian remakes and spin-off films.

=== Billa series ===
Billa is a South Indian film series based on Don, including three Tamil films, as well as a Telugu remake.

- Billa (1980) — remake of Don (1978), starring Rajinikanth.
- Billa (2007) — remake of Billa (1980), starring Ajith Kumar.
- Billa (2009) — Telugu remake of Billa (2007), starring Prabhas.
- Billa II (2012) — prequel of Billa (2007), starring Ajith Kumar.

=== Other remakes ===
- Yugandhar (1979) — Telugu remake of Don (1978), starring N. T. Rama Rao.
- Shobaraj (1986) — Malayalam remake of Don (1978), starring Mohanlal.
