= Roma (character) =

Character from Bollywood Don films

- Zeenat Aman (left) and Priyanka Chopra (right) as Roma
- First appearance: Don (1978)
- Last appearance: Don 3 (TBA)
- Created by: Salim–Javed
- Portrayed by: Zeenat Aman (1978); Priyanka Chopra (2006-2011)

In-universe information
- Gender: Female
- Occupation: Interpol Officer
- Family: Ramesh (brother)
- Significant others: Vijay (original film); Don (ex-lover, remake)
- Nationality: Indian

Roma is a fictional character in the Don franchise. The character was created by the screenwriters duo Salim–Javed. Roma first appeared in the 1978 film Don with Zeenat Aman portraying her and is portrayed by Priyanka Chopra in its 2006 remake and its 2011 sequel Don 2.

In the original film, Roma plans to avenge her brother's death by killing Don, so she infiltrates Don's gang. Later she falls in love with Vijay when finds out about Don's death. In its 2006 remake, the character shares similar storyline until the end when it is revealed that it was Vijay who died and Don had escaped. In the 2011 sequel, Roma joins Interpol to hunt him down. Despite their differences, Roma and Don both fall in love with each other.

The character has appeared in several films, comics, and video games, and has gained popularity as an action heroine.

== Films ==
=== 1978 film – Don ===
After Don kills Roma's brother, Ramesh, when he decides to leave his business, and Ramesh's fiancée Kamini, Roma, plots the plan to avenge her brother's death and starts training in judo and karate, and then enters Don's gang after deceiving them into thinking that she too is on the wrong side of the law. Don is impressed with her fighting skills and allows her to work for him without suspecting any ulterior motive.

When Don dies in a police encounter then Officer D'Silva's who is the only one that knows of Don's death, recruits Don's doppelganger Vijay, a slum-dwelling simpleton trying to survive in the hustle and bustle of Bombay in order to support two small foster children. D'Silva hatches a plan to transform Vijay into Don so he can arrest the rest of the gang.

Around the time Vijay "returns" to Don's gang as Don under the guise of amnesia. One day Roma goes after him, but Vijay survives the attack and he tries to explain to her that he is not Don, but Vijay. She refuses to believe him at first but D'Silva intervenes and tells her that the man she is trying to kill is indeed Vijay. Roma apologizes to Vijay, and joins him. Roma and Vijay starts to fall in love.

Meanwhile, as Vijay learns more and more about Don through his discovery of his diary and Roma's help, he announces to his colleagues that his memory has returned. Celebrations ensue as Don announces his return to the world, but things take a drastic turn when the police raid the celebrations, acting upon Vijay's information, but Vijay's only witness to his true identity, D'Silva, is shot in the crossfire, and Vijay is arrested because the police think he is Don. A desperate Vijay tries to get a gravely injured D'Silva to tell the police he is Vijay. Unfortunately the DSP dies from his injuries and Vijay is imprisoned. However, he escapes the police truck while on the way to a high-security jail. He begins to fight for himself and tries prove his innocence. Roma, now an ally of Vijay, agrees to do whatever she can to help him.

Tangled in a web of confusion where the police refuse to believe that he is Vijay while simultaneously his underworld gang realize that he is indeed not Don, Vijay incites the ire of both the police and Don's right-hand man, Narang. To add to Vijay's woes, the diary that Vijay had handed over to D'Silva – his last hope of proving his innocence – is stolen by Jasjit in an attempt to track down his lost children, without realizing that Vijay is the one man who can reunite them. Vijay escapes the clutches of the police and the underworld with Roma's help and returns to his old self though he struggles to prove his identity and innocence. In the process, he also discovers that the Interpol officer R. K. Malik is actually the underworld crime boss Vardhan, who had killed DSP D'Silva, and had also abducted the real R. K. After Vardhan is arrested, Roma and Vijay get together.

=== 2006 film – Don ===
After Roma's brother, Ramesh is killed after he decides to leave the gang, and later Ramesh's fiancée Kamini, Roma plans to avenger her brother's death and infiltrates Don's gang. Don is injured and falls into a coma while trying to flee from the police. De Silva finds a look-alike named Vijay and asks him to join his mission so the police can get close to Singhania.

When Don suddenly dies, Vijay, posing as Don, joins the gang in Kuala Lumpur. De Silva asks Vijay to find a computer disc containing details about the drug cartel and bring it to him. When Vijay finds it, Roma attempts to kill him, but De Silva intervenes and tells her about his plan and Don's real identity and she agrees to help him. Vijay hands over the disc to De Silva. Later Vijay informs De Silva that the entire gang is going to assemble at one place. When the police arrive, De Silva murders Singhania and the police arrest Vijay. De Silva is killed in the shoot-out, which is unfortunate for Vijay because De Silva was the only person who could prove that he is not the real Don. Having discovered his true identity, Don's associates turn against Vijay and the group engage in a fight. Vijay escapes and meets with Roma to recover the disc and prove his innocence.

Meanwhile, Jasjit enters De Silva's apartment to wait for him and finds the disc. He receives a phone call saying that if he wants to see his son again, he will have to bring the disc to the men who are holding Deepu hostage. When he meets them, he learns that De Silva has been alive all along and is actually Vardhan, who was using Vijay to get close to his competitor. Later, Jasjit engages in a combat with Vijay but Deepu interrupts him, telling him about Vijay, who has been his guardian in Jasjit's absence. Jasjit teams up with Vijay and Roma and shares information about Vardhan's real identity. They come up with a plan. Jasjit arranges a meeting with Vardhan, but the trio have informed the Interpol.

In a combat, Vijay overpowers Vardhan and is about to kill him but is interrupted by Inspector Vishal Malik, who pleads with him to leave Vardhan, who is arrested. Vijay is acquitted, and Roma confesses her love for Vijay when is about to be taken to the hospital. After Vijay calls Roma a "Junglee Billi" ("Wildcat") and the van takes Vijay away, Roma realise that he is actually Don as he had given her that nickname and informs Malik.

It is revealed that the real Don is alive, and was pretending to be Vijay the whole time. While in the hospital, Don had recovered quickly from his injuries, and had overheard Vardhan's conversation with Vijay. After Vijay's operation, Don had gotten up from the room at a moment when Vardhan and Dr. Ashok were absent and gone to the room where Vijay lay. He had switched places with Vijay and taken Vijay off life support, causing him to die. Don escapes.

=== 2011 film – Don 2 ===
Five years after the events of the first film, Roma is now an Interpol Officer. Don returns to Malaysia, and unexpectedly surrenders to Roma, who has joined Interpol, and Inspector Malik (Om Puri). Don is sentenced to death and sent to prison, where he meets old rival Vardhan. He offers Vardhan a partnership, and they escape from prison after poisoning the other inmates.

Don and his team plan and execute a bank robbery, taking hostages. After stealing the printing plates he is betrayed by Vardhaan and Jabbar, but escapes. However, Sameer (a team member) calls the police and Don is arrested; he threatens Sameer for informing on him. Unable to enter the bank and free the hostages, the police are forced to work with Don in exchange for giving him German immunity.

Don and Roma reach Vardhaan and Jabbar. When ordered by Vardhaan and Jabbar – and even Don himself – Roma is shot by Jabbar when she refuses to kill Don. She still has feelings for Don, although he killed her brother five years earlier, and she also refused to kill him because she refused to do it the illegal way. Don defeats Vardhaan and his thugs, and kills Jabbar. Don ultimately saves the entire team. Don obtains his immunity papers, surrendering the plates and a disc with information about his team. He brings Roma to a waiting ambulance, and they exchange glances before the doors close. Don escapes again.

== Other appearances ==
Roma also appears in the comic books. In October 2011 a comic book based on Don 2, Don: The Origin, was published. The comic provides background details of Roma. Roma also appears in the PlayStation 2 game, Don 2: The King is Back, was released in India in February 2013 as the final PAL game for PS2.

== Creation and casting ==
The character was created by the screenwriters duo Salim–Javed. It was later developed by Farhan Akhtar for the 2011 film. with Zeenat Aman portrayed her in the 1978 film Don and is later portrayed by Priyanka Chopra in its 2006 remake and its sequel Don 2 in 2011.

Priyanka Chopra was cast to play Roma as Akhtar found her to be perfect for the role, saying, "There is a docile sensuality about her which suits the character". When he offered the role to her, she was excited to play the character and immediately agreed to do the film.

== Reception ==
The character of Roma has received good feedback from critics and audiences. Roma played by Zeenat Aman is considered as iconic. Later Priyanka Chopra was also praised for her role. Raja Sen of Rediff.com was impressed by Priyanka Chopra's performance, calling it "film's biggest surprise", and wrote, "Stepping into Zeenat Aman's shoes is a tough task, but she doesn't really waste time pretending to be the stunner's successor. Chopra handles her role with efficiency, looking every bit the competent woman of action – and a ravishing babe who fills out a skintight white jumpsuit deliciously. Roma is a hard part to play, but Priyanka has a no-nonsense air about her throughout the film. This is an actress willing to push herself, and has definite potential for screen magic. Not to mention a great smile."

== Other versions ==
Roma has appeared in several non-Hindi films, most of which are remakes of the 1978 original. These include the Telugu film Yugandhar (1979) where she was played by Jayasudha, the Tamil film Billa (1980) where she was played by Sripriya, and the Malayalam film Shobhraj (1986), where she was played by Madhavi. Nayanthara played the character in Billa's 2007 Tamil remake of the same name, while Anushka Shetty reprised the role in the 2009 Telugu version.
