= Don (1978 film) =

1978 Indian film by Chandra Barot

- Theatrical release poster
- Directed by: Chandra Barot
- Written by: Salim–Javed
- Produced by: Nariman Irani
- Starring: Amitabh Bachchan; Zeenat Aman; Pran; Iftekhar; Om Shivpuri; Helen; Kamal Kapoor
- Cinematography: Nariman Irani
- Edited by: Waman Rao
- Music by: Kalyanji–Anandji
- Production company: Nariman Films
- Release date: 12 May 1978
- Running time: 166 minutes
- Country: India
- Language: Hindi
- Budget: est.₹7 million
- Box office: est. ₹70 million

Don is a 1978 Indian Hindi-language action thriller film directed by Chandra Barot, written by Salim–Javed and produced by Nariman Irani. The film stars Amitabh Bachchan in dual role, alongside Zeenat Aman, Pran, Iftekhar, Om Shivpuri and Satyen Kappu in supporting roles. The music was composed by Kalyanji–Anandji with lyrics written by Anjaan and Indeevar.

Don was the third highest-grossing Indian film of 1978 and was classified a golden jubilee by Box Office India. The film spawned the Don franchise; Javed Akhtar's son Farhan Akhtar created a remake Don: The Chase Begins Again (2006) and its sequel Don 2 (2011), both starring Shah Rukh Khan. It also inspired several South Indian remakes, including the Telugu film Yugandhar (1979) and the Tamil film Billa (1980). Don is also known for its theme music, which was used in the American Dad! episode "Tearjerker" (2008). The intro "Yeh Mera Dil" was sampled by the Black Eyed Peas for the song "Don't Phunk with My Heart" (2005).

== Plot ==
Mark Donald "Don" is a notorious crime boss in Mumbai who always eludes the authorities despite being wanted in eleven countries. DSP D'Silva, Inspector Verma and Interpol officer R. K. Malik have spent the last few years in capturing Don, but to no avail. During a chase with the police, Don is severely wounded after an accident and dies in front of D'Silva, who holds a burial of Don without anyone's knowledge. D'Silva keeps Don's death as a secret even from his fellow officers, and tracks down a look-alike called Vijay, a street performer. D'Silva asks Vijay to infiltrate Don's gang by pretending to be Don. In return, D'Silva will make sure that the children Vijay adopted, Deepu and Munni, get a proper education.

D'Silva trains Vijay and sends him back to Don's gang, disguised as an amnesiac Don, who had been hiding at an apartment complex due to his injuries. Slowly, Vijay starts to learn about Don's gang. Vijay provides a diary with the secret information of the crime network to D'Silva, but he is about to be killed by Roma because her brother Ramesh as well as his fiancée Kamini were killed by Don earlier. At this juncture, D'Silva arrives and tells her that he is Vijay and not Don. Later before a party, Vijay secretly provides information to D'Silva about a meeting of Don's network. A shootout occurs at the party and D'Silva is killed in a crossfire. Vijay finds D'Silva dead and is taken into the custody of the police team, now headed by Malik.

Vijay argues to Malik that he is not Don and mentions a piece of evidence – the diary, which may prove his innocence, but the diary is nowhere to be found. Unable to prove his innocence, Vijay escapes from a police van and joins Roma, where he learns that the diary is stolen by a person named Jasjit in order to track down his children Deepu and Munni. Jasjit meets Vijay and Roma and joins them. However, the trio learns that Malik is actually Vardhaan who captured the real Malik and posed as the latter to cover his crime and that Vardhaan was the one who had murdered D'Silva during the party and had already exposed Roma's identity to the gang members before having them kidnap Deepu and Munni so that the trio can surrender themselves and the diary to Vardhaan.

After being captured by Vardhaan, Jasjit is reunited with Deepu and Munni and manages to escape the hideout with them, thanking Vijay for taking care of his children. Meeting up in the same graveyard where Don was buried, Vardhaan and his gang members who are holding Deepu and Munni hostages, have a long standoff with Vijay, Roma and Jasjit, resulting in Vardhaan grabbing the diary from Roma and throwing it in a fire. Eventually, Vardhaan calls Inspector Verma and the police to the scene to have the trio and the gang members arrested so that he can get away scot-free. However, anticipating the possibility that Vardhaan would try to escape, Vijay cleverly reveals that the diary that he had thrown in the fire was actually a blank one that he had switched just as he hands over the real diary to Verma, exposing Vardhaan's identity to the police. Vardhaan and the gang members are arrested, while Vijay, Roma, Jasjit, Deepu and Munni happily leave the police station.

== Cast ==
- Amitabh Bachchan in a dual role as
  - Vijay
  - Mark Donald "Don"
- Zeenat Aman as Roma
- Pran as Jasjit ("JJ") Ahuja
- Iftekhar as DSP D'Silva
- Om Shivpuri as Vardhaan / the fake R. K. Malik
- Satyen Kappu as Inspector Verma, DSP D'Silva's junior
- P. Jairaj as Dayal, Judo & Karate trainer
- Kamal Kapoor as Sham Narang, Vardhaan's right-hand man
- Moolchand as Govinda fat man in the song "Khaike Paan Banaraswala"
- Arpana Choudhary as Anita, Don's girlfriend
- Helen as Kamini, Ramesh's fiancée
- M. B. Shetty as Shakaal, Don's gang member
- Mac Mohan as Mac, Don's gang member
- Yusuf Khan as Vikram, Don's gang member
- Pinchoo Kapoor as the real R. K. Malik, Interpol officer
- Sharad Kumar as Ramesh, Roma's brother
- Baby Bilkish as Munni, Jasjit's daughter
- Alankar Joshi as Dipak "Dipu", Jasjit's son

== Production ==
Producer and cinematographer Nariman Irani was in a financial mess when his film Zindagi Zindagi (1972), starring Sunil Dutt flopped. He was in debt for Rs 1.2 million and couldn't pay the money off on a cinematographer's salary. When he was doing the cinematography for Manoj Kumar's major hit Roti Kapada Aur Makaan (1974), the film's cast (Amitabh Bachchan, Zeenat Aman, Pran) and crew (assistant director Chandra Barot) decided to help him out. They all recommended that he produce another film and that they would anticipate in its production. They all approached scriptwriting duo Salim–Javed (Salim Khan and Javed Akhtar), who gave them an untitled script that had already been rejected by the entire industry. The cinematographer Nariman Irani, while working on Chhailla Babu, decided to borrow most of the plot of Chhailla Babu and shared a modified story idea with Chandra Barot, who made the new modified story into the film Don (1978). The script had a character named Don. Bachchan would play Don, and Barot would direct the film. Aman and Pran would play key roles in the film.

The film took three-and-a-half years to complete. Before filming was completed, producer Irani died from an accident on the set of another film he was working on. During the making of Manoj Kumar's Kranti in November 1977 at Rajkamal Kalamandir Studios, Bombay, a sudden cloudburst caused a wall to collapse on Nariman Irani. He was seriously injured, hospitalized, and passed away a few days later. Barot faced budget restraints but received aid. The rest of the cinematography and production was completed by Barot with support from the cast and crew. Barot showed the film to his mentor Manoj Kumar, who felt that the film was too tight and needed a song in the midst of the action-filled film, and so "Khaike Paan Banaraswala" was added into the film. Don was released without any promotion on 12 May 1978 and was declared a flop the first week. Within a week after adding the song "Khaike Paan Banaraswala", the song by itself became a big hit, and word of mouth spread, so by the second week, the film's fortunes were reversed, and the film was declared a blockbuster. The profits from the film were given to Irani's widow to settle her husband's debts.

The hit-song "Khaike Pan Banaraswala" sung by Kishore Kumar was choreographed by P. L. Raj.

Don was produced on a budget of ₹70 lakh ($860,000). Adjusted for inflation, its budget is equivalent to $4.2 million (₹22 crore) in 2016.

== Soundtrack ==
Don

Soundtrack album by Kalyanji–Anandji
- Released: 1978
- Label: EMI Records
- Producer: Kalyanji–Anandji

The soundtrack of the film has been composed by the duo Kalyanji–Anandji, while the lyrics were written by Anjaan and Indeevar.

According to film music expert Rajesh Subramanian, the song "Khaike Paan Banaraswala" was composed by Babla, the younger brother of a famous music director Kalyanji–Anandji.

Kishore Kumar and Asha Bhosle received accolades at filmfare for the tracks "Khaike Paan Banaraswala" and "Yeh Mera Dil" respectively, both of which have also been remixed in the remake.

Song	Singer
"Jiska Mujhe Tha Intezaar, Jiske Liye Dil Tha Bekaraar"	Kishore Kumar, Lata Mangeshkar
"Khaike Paan Banaraswala"	Kishore Kumar
"Ee Hai Bambai Nagaria"	Kishore Kumar
"Main Hoon Don"	Kishore Kumar
"Yeh Mera Dil"	Asha Bhosle

== Box office ==
At the Indian box office, the film grossed ₹3.5 crore ($8.6 million). Adjusted for inflation, its box office gross is equivalent to $30 million (₹186 crore) in 2016.

== Awards ==
Award	Category	Recipients and nominees	Results
26th Filmfare Awards	Best Actor	Amitabh Bachchan	Won
26th Filmfare Awards	Best Male Playback Singer	Kishore Kumar for "Khaike Paan Banaraswala"	Won
26th Filmfare Awards	Best Female Playback Singer	Asha Bhosle for "Yeh Mera Dil"	Won
26th Filmfare Awards	Best Music Director	Kalyanji–Anandji	Nominated
26th Filmfare Awards	Best Lyricist	Anjaan for "Khaike Paan Banaraswala"	Nominated

== Legacy and influence ==
=== Don series ===
The film was remade in 2006 as Don starring Shah Rukh Khan in the lead role of Don and Vijay, Priyanka Chopra as Roma, Arjun Rampal as Jasjit, Boman Irani as D'Silva, and Om Puri as Malik. It was directed by Farhan Akhtar. With some changes in the script, the film proved to be one of the highest-grossing films of the year. A sequel to that film, Don 2, was released on 23 December 2011.

=== Remakes in other languages ===
- Don was first remade in 1979 in Telugu as Yugandhar, starring NTR, Jayasudha and Jayamalini.
- It was also remade in 1980 in Tamil as Billa, starring Rajinikanth. Helen, who played Kamini in the original Hindi film Don (1978), repeated her role in this remake. Billa was a breakthrough film for Rajinikanth, establishing him as the top star of South Indian cinema.
- In 1986, the movie was remade in Malayalam as Shobaraj, starring Mohanlal and Madhavi.
- In 1991, the movie was remade into a Punjabi language Pakistani movie titled Cobra, starring Sultan Rahi and Nadira.
- The 2006 Hindi remake starring Shah Rukh Khan, titled Don, inspired the Tamil directors who made the Ajith Kumar starrer Billa — a remake of the same-titled Rajinikanth film.
- In 2009, a second Telugu remake titled Billa was released, starring Prabhas, Anushka Shetty, Namitha and Krishnam Raju, and Jayasudha in a different role than the one she played in Yugandhar. This film used the same title as the Tamil remakes.
- Billa II (2012) is a Tamil film starring Ajith and a prequel to Billa (2007).

=== Music ===
A sample from the song "Yeh Mera Dil" was used by The Black Eyed Peas for their hit song "Don't Phunk with My Heart" in 2005. The song won the Black Eyed Peas their first Grammy Award for Best Rap Performance by a Duo or Group, while the composers for "Yeh Mera Dil", Kalyanji–Anandji, were awarded the BMI Award for being the originators of the melodies used in "Don't Phunk with My Heart."

The third season American Dad! episode "Tearjerker" (2008) uses the theme music in its intro sequence.

The third episode of the Marvel Studios television series Ms. Marvel features "Yeh Mera Dil" in a wedding dance sequence.
