= Chhailla Babu =

- Poster
- Directed by: Joy Mukherjee
- Produced by: Shomu Mukherjee
- Starring: Rajesh Khanna; Zeenat Aman
- Cinematography: Nariman A. Irani
- Edited by: B. S. Glaad
- Music by: Laxmikant Pyarelal
- Release date: 29 April 1977
- Country: India
- Language: Hindi

Chhailla Babu (Alternate name: Chhaila Babu) (English language: Cool Guy) is a 1977 Bollywood suspense thriller film. It was written and produced by Shomu Mukherjee and directed by Joy Mukherjee. Rajesh Khanna plays the title role of Chhailla Babu. It stars Zeenat Aman, Asrani, Om Shivpuri and Ranjeet. The film's music is by Laxmikant Pyarelal. It had a collection of 4 crores in 1977. The film became a superhit. This was the only film directed by Joy to be successful at the box office. and the success of Chhailla Babu gave a boost to the career of Khanna, who went through a bad phase between 1976 and 1978 at the box office.

The cinematographer in this film, Nariman Irani, while working on this film decided to borrow most of the plot of Chhailla Babu and shared a modified story idea to Chandra Barot, who made the new modified story as the film Don (1978).

== Plot ==
A suspense thriller, Chhaila Babu was the yesteryear actor Joy Mukherjee's second and only successful film as a director.

Rita, played by Zeenat, is vacationing in the snowy mountains in Kashmir. Rita is a ski champion. A warning sign on the slopes is chopped down by an unseen person, and Rita skis blithely on into danger. She's rescued by a local ski guide, who shows up again minutes later as a carriage driver. When she asks him who he really is, he responds with a song: "Main Chhaila Babu".

Chhaila Babu had first posed as a skiing lifeguard and then as a tangewala. Meanwhile, in Bombay, Rita's gangster dad is murdered while trying to run away with a suitcase that has cash worth Rs 80 lakhs. A policeman curiously reaches the murder scene, and the dying dad murmurs a number into his ear: 77203. With no sign of the suitcase and suspecting the dreaded "Scorpion" to be behind the crime, the police call Rita to Mumbai.

When he drops her off at her hostel, a CBI Inspector (Om Shivpuri) is waiting for her. He tells her about her father's murder and asks her about the money. She's distraught but knows nothing, and he asks her to return to Bombay to help the CBI in their investigation. At the airport observing her arrival are the gang and—Chhaila Babu, wearing a medal around his neck. Mac Mohan attacks Rita at her home and suddenly Chhaila Babu steps in to save her. Macmohan sees his Scorpion medal, and both men flee. Chhaila Babu tenderly administers to Rita's wounds and kisses her. He tells her that he loves her and wants to marry her, and if she hands over the robbery money he'll take it to the police for her—otherwise he's afraid she'll be killed for it. Rita sees a diamond necklace hanging out of one of his pockets, and tells him furiously to get out. He tells her that society has made him a thief; that it robbed him of his family and left him with nothing to live for except vengeance, but she's unsympathetic.

Rita finds Chhaila in Mumbai again, this time as a taxi driver. He tells her that her words the night before have changed him. He tells her about his past. Meanwhile, the police and the CBI Inspector are pretty sure that Chhaila Babu is Scorpion, but they need evidence. He takes her to a nightclub and there he starts flirting with Lily. The club happens to belong to Ranjit, and Mac Mohan is there too; he recognizes Chhaila Babu as Scorpion. As he tells Ranjit who Chhaila Babu really is?

But she is soon told that the man with many disguises could be the Scorpion, who could be her dad's killer. A furious Rita now gets determined to kill Chhailla, but the rest of the story is all about who Chhailla Babu is, why he is behind the girl, and how he was in Kashmir when Rita had been there too. In the end, Rita and Chaila Babu unite. It is also shown that Chaila is actually a police commissioner.

== Reception ==
It had collections of 4,00,00,000 in 1977 and became a superhit. It received four stars in the Bollywood guide Collections.

== Cast ==
- Rajesh Khanna as Chhailla Babu
- Zeenat Aman as Rita Verma
- Asrani as Chitku
- Ranjeet as Group #3
- Padma Khanna as Lily
- P. Jairaj as Pratap Verma
- Manmohan as Group #2
- Gulshan Arora as Gulshan
- Mac Mohan as Mac
- Ravindra Kapoor as Chitku's brother
- Om Shivpuri as CBI Inspector
- Achala Sachdev as Mother
- D. K. Sapru as Father
- Mohan Sherry as Sherry
- Johnny Whiskey as drunk man
- Kader Khan as voice of Scorpion
- Yusuf Khan as the man killed by Pratap
- Ashim Kumar as Police inspector
- Master Salim as young Chhaila babu

== Soundtrack ==
- The background music played during the initial titles can be also heard in the song "Ho jata hai kaise pyar" in the movie Yalgar (1992) music by Channi Singh.
- Lyricist: Anand Bakshi
1. "Main Babu Chhailla" : Kishore Kumar
2. "Yaar Dildar Tujhe Kaisa Chahiye" : Kishore Kumar, Asha Bhosle
3. "Kal Raat Sadak Pe Ek Ladki" : Kishore Kumar, Asha Bhosle
4. "Humko Nikaloge Gharse" : Kishore Kumar, Asha Bhosle
5. "Chhailla Mera Chhailla" (Happy version) : Lata Mangeshkar
6. "Chhailla Mera Chhailla" (Sad version) : Lata Mangeshkar
7. "Chhailla Tera Chhailla Agaya" (Sad version) : Kishore Kumar
