= Don 2 =

2011 Indian film by Farhan Akhtar

Don 2: The King Is Back
- Theatrical release poster
- Directed by: Farhan Akhtar
- Written by: Farhan Akhtar; Ameet Mehta; Amrish Shah
- Dialogues by: Farhan Akhtar
- Produced by: Ritesh Sidhwani; Shah Rukh Khan; Farhan Akhtar
- Starring: Shah Rukh Khan; Priyanka Chopra; Boman Irani; Kunal Kapoor; Ally Khan; Nawwab Shah; Sahil Shroff; Om Puri; Lara Dutta
- Cinematography: Jason West
- Edited by: Anand Subaya
- Music by: Shankar–Ehsaan–Loy
- Production company: Excel Entertainment
- Distributed by: Reliance Entertainment
- Release date: 23 December 2011
- Running time: 148 minutes
- Country: India
- Language: Hindi
- Budget: ₹76 crore
- Box office: est. ₹202.81 crore

Don 2: The King Is Back, better simply known as Don 2, is a 2011 Indian Hindi-language action thriller film written and directed by Farhan Akhtar. It is the second instalment in the Don reboot series and sequel to the 2006 film Don. It was jointly produced by Akhtar, Ritesh Sidhwani, and Shah Rukh Khan under the banner of Excel Entertainment. The film stars Khan as the titular anti-hero, and Priyanka Chopra as Roma, alongside Lara Dutta, Boman Irani, Kunal Kapoor, Om Puri, Nawab Shah, and Alyy Khan in supporting roles. Set five years after the events of the first film, Don, a powerful international drug lord, plans to steal currency printing from a bank in Berlin to take over the counterfeiting business in Europe, while Roma has joined the Interpol to hunt him down. The film's soundtrack was composed by Shankar–Ehsaan–Loy, with lyrics written by Javed Akhtar.

Following the success of the first film, Akhtar began planning a sequel in 2007, although plans did not materialize. The project was later announced in early 2010, with filming scheduled to commence later that year. Principal photography took place primarily in Berlin, where most of the film was shot. Jason West handled the cinematography, while Anand Subaya edited the film.

Don 2 was released on 23 December 2011 in 2D and 3D formats, along with dubbed versions in Tamil and Telugu. Upon release, the film received positive reviews from critics, receiving praise for its story, cinematography, production design, soundtrack, background score, action sequences and performances of the cast. Don 2 was a commercial success, grossing over ₹202.81 crore (US$21 million) to emerge as the third highest-grossing film of the year.

At the 57th Filmfare Awards, Don 2 received 5 nominations including Best Film, Best Director (Farhan) and Best Actor (Khan), and won 2 awards – Best Action and Best Sound Design.

== Plot ==
Five years after taking control of the Asian underworld, Don sets his sights on expanding his empire into Europe. At a meeting in the French Riviera, European cartel leaders agree to put a contract on Don's life, as his aggressive price cuts threaten their businesses. Meanwhile, Don travels to a remote base in Thailand to collect a shipment of drugs, but is ambushed by his associates, who have allied with the Europeans. Don manages to eliminate the traitors and destroy the compound before setting his sights on a much larger scheme. Don travels to Kuala Lumpur, Malaysia, where he voluntarily surrenders to Inspector Vishal Malik and Roma, who has since become an Interpol officer. He is sentenced to death and sent to a high-security prison, where he encounters his former nemesis, Vardhaan. Although Vardhaan initially seeks revenge for his prior downfall, Don proposes an alliance to execute a prison break. The two put their plan into action by poisoning the prison water supply, incapacitating the inmates. Taking advantage of the resulting chaos, they manage to escape.

In Zurich, Don reunites with his trusted ally, Ayesha. Using a locker key previously held by Vardhaan, he retrieves a recording that implicates J.K. Diwan, the vice president of the Euro-printing Deutsche Zentral-Bank (DZB) in Berlin. The recording reveals that Diwan paid Singhania to assassinate James Werden, the bank's preferred candidate for president, allowing Diwan’s superior, Fabian Kohl, to secure the position. Don then travels to Berlin and blackmails Diwan into handing over the blueprints to the bank's underground currency-printing vault. However, Diwan gives him blank discs instead and hires Abdul Jabbar, a ruthless mercenary, to eliminate him. Anticipating the betrayal, Don fights off the ambush and persuades Jabbar into joining his operation.

Under coercion, Diwan eventually hands over the genuine blueprints. Meanwhile, Roma and Malik track Don to Berlin and question Diwan, but find no evidence to justify his arrest. With the blueprints secured, Don and his crew, which includes hacker Sameer Ali, infiltrate the DZB, seize control of the vault, and steal the original currency printing plates. However, once the theft is complete, Vardhaan and Jabbar turn against Don, taking the vault staff hostage and seizing the plates. Don manages to escape through an air vent, but Sameer seemingly appears to betray him by alerting Interpol and the Berlin Police to his whereabouts. Don is subsequently captured outside the vault's perimeter.

Don negotiates with Malik and the German authorities, offering to disarm the explosives inside the bank, rescue the hostages, and recover the stolen printing plates, in exchange for immunity and full pardons for his team. He then re-enters the building alongside Roma, and fights his way through Vardhaan’s mercenaries to reach the central command room. A standoff ensues, during which Vardhaan orders Roma to shoot Don. Torn between her feelings for Don and her duty as a police officer, Roma refuses. Jabbar then shoots her, leaving her wounded but alive. Enraged by the attack, Don shoots Jabbar dead before overpowering Vardhaan in hand-to-hand combat. Vardhaan is arrested, while Don carries the injured Roma to a awaiting ambulance. Having fulfilled his part of the agreement, Don surrenders the currency plates and a flash drive to Malik in exchange for signed immunity papers. Shortly afterwards, Don remotely detonates an explosive planted in Diwan’s vehicle, killing him and destroying the recovered printing plates in the blast.

A final epilogue reveals that Don had orchestrated the entire operation from the beginning. Sameer’s apparent betrayal was part of the plan, allowing Don to secure his immunity papers through the hostage negotiations. The printing plates destroyed in Diwan’s car were also revealed to be duplicates, meaning Don had kept the original plates for himself. Furthermore, the flash drive surrendered to Interpol contained the identities and financial trails of Kohl and the European cartel bosses, leading to their immediate arrest across the continent. With his rivals eliminated, authorities neutralised, and both Vardhaan and the European cartel leadership imprisoned, Don leaves Berlin with Ayesha and Sameer on a high-powered motorcycle, having established himself as the undisputed king of both the Asian and European underworlds.

== Cast ==
- Shah Rukh Khan as Mark "Don" Donald
- Priyanka Chopra as Roma Bhagat
- Boman Irani as Vardhaan
- Kunal Kapoor as Sameer "Sam" Ali
- Om Puri as Detective Vishal Malik
- Lara Dutta as Ayesha Singh
- Ally Khan as J. K. Diwan
- Nawwab Shah as Abdul Jabbar
- Sahil Shroff as Arjun Shergill
- Wolfgang Stegemann as Karl Cost, Jabbar's German aide
- Rike Schmid as Yana Ali, Sameer's wife
- Martin Goeres as Jabbar's Goon
- Timo Honsa as Jabbar's Goon
- Christian Maria Goebel as Fabian Kohl
- Günter Barton as James Werden
- Bianca Karsten as Sophie Kohl
- Hans-Eckart Eckhardt as Dr. Diedrich Schneider
- Klaus Schindler as Commissioner Muller, Berlin Police
- Jason West as Jimmy Coogan
- Ridzuan Hashim as Jaruwan
- Adi Putra as Don's Malaysian lawyer
- Florian Lukas as Officer Jens Berkel
- Nicolas Walier as SEK officer
- Sten Jacobs as SEK officer
- Rajesh Khattar as Cartel boss Singhania (archive footage)
- Hrithik Roshan as Don (disguised face; special appearance)

== Production ==
=== Development ===
A sequel was announced in 2007, a year after the release of Don (2006) by Farhan Akhtar. However, the film got delayed due to Shah Rukh Khan's shoulder surgery. The original cast reprised their roles except for Arjun Rampal and Ishaa Koppikar; Lara Dutta and Kunal Kapoor were cast in new roles. Akhtar said that he decided to make a sequel to his 2006 film because it "gave him a lot of freedom to explore the character". Khan copyrighted a tattoo of "D" on his arm and grew his hair long for the film.

Khan exercised extensively for the role and performed almost all the stunts by himself. Don 2 marked Khan's return to playing villains after earlier films such as Darr and Baazigar. Chopra learned martial arts and trained for over two months. Boman Irani lost 12 kg for the role and grew a beard to make his character look "cold, cunning and deceitful"; he felt that playing a villain was "a big stretch" for him as an actor. Dutta was cast after Koppikar, who played the role in Don, dropped out of the film. She was recommended to Akhtar by Khan, who had worked with her on Billu in 2009. However, her role was changed after her casting, and turned out to be a different character than Koppikar's. In an interview with The Hindustan Times, Dutta said that it was exciting to play a new character, since there would be no predecessor to live up to.

=== Filming ===
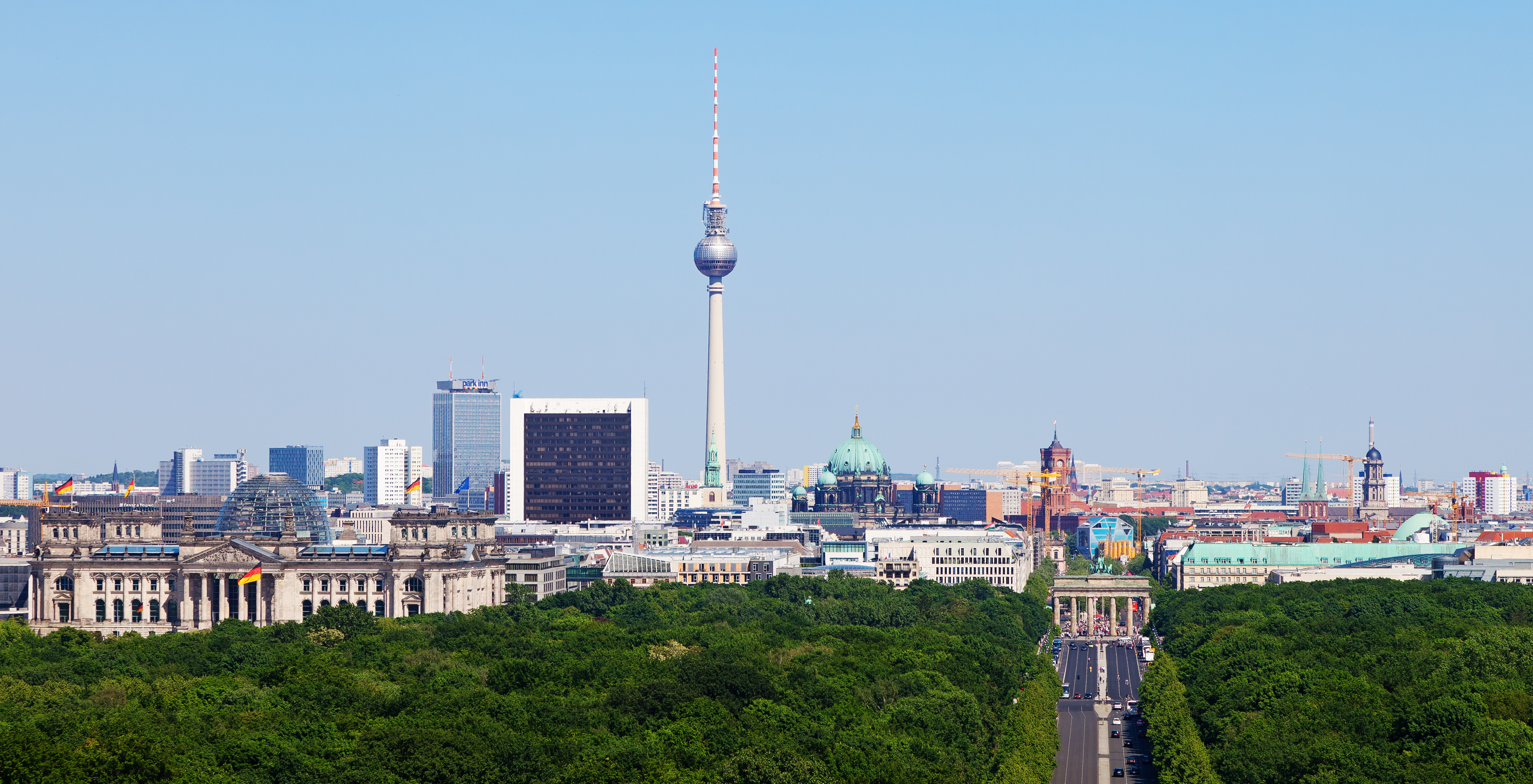
Don 2 was extensively shot in Berlin.

Principal photography of Don 2 began in October 2010 in Berlin, becoming the first Hindi film to be shot there. The decision to shoot in the city was made after Khan attended the Berlin International Film Festival for its screening of My Name is Khan and realised that the city provided the required realistic backdrop for the film. Before shooting began the German government announced the film on its website, promising support and co-operation during filming. A 70-member Indian crew travelled to the city for two weeks of preparation for shooting. Scenes were filmed at the Brandenburg Gate, the Alexanderplatz, the French Cathedral and the East Side Gallery. The German government provided €3 million in incentives to the film's producers, since it was shot in Berlin. The shoot cost €6.8 million.

Khan experimented with several looks and performed his own stunts in the film. In Berlin, he performed a 300-foot jump for a scene. A car-chase scene using 67 cars closed main thoroughfares (including the Brandenburg Gate) for three weeks. Each day, alternate routes were provided around roads cordoned off for filming. The shooting schedule also included a special appearance by Hrithik Roshan, whose presence was kept under wraps by filmmakers. In December 2010, the Berlin schedule ended. In February 2011, the actors flew to Malaysia, where several scenes were shot in Malacca Prison with prisoners as extras. A section of the prison block was made available for filming, with special T-shirts distinguishing crew members from prisoners in the high-security zone. Khan trained with Hollywood stunt and fight director Wolfgang Stegemann, who also played Karl in the film.

In September 2011, filming resumed on a song featuring the two leads. Another song was shot with Khan in Goa in late November, only a month before the film's release. The song was shot as an action sequence, but did not appear in the film. In August 2011, the producers said they will release Don 2 in 3D. The idea of 3D conversion occurred to Akhtar while shooting; after tests in Los Angeles, it was decided to convert the entire film. The director of photography had used special lenses, which made conversion easier. Sidhwani said that the idea of converting the film into 3D came to him after seeing Harry Potter and the Deathly Hallows – Part 2. Chuck Comisky, a veteran S-3D innovator who supervised 3D stereo and visual effects for Avatar and Sanctum, was given the job. Anand Subaya was the editor and Jason West served as the director of photography. The digital intermediate and VFX of Don 2 were by Pixion Studios, and the 3D conversion by Reliance Mediaworks.

== Soundtrack ==
The soundtrack was composed by Shankar–Ehsaan–Loy, with lyrics written by Javed Akhtar. The album contains nine compositions: four original songs, two instrumentals, a dialogue snippet, and two remix out of four original songs. The vocals were performed by Vishal Dadlani, Anusha Mani, Usha Uthup, Shankar Mahadevan, Sunitha Sarathy, KK and Caralisa Monteiro. It was released on 16 November 2011 by T-Series.

== Marketing ==
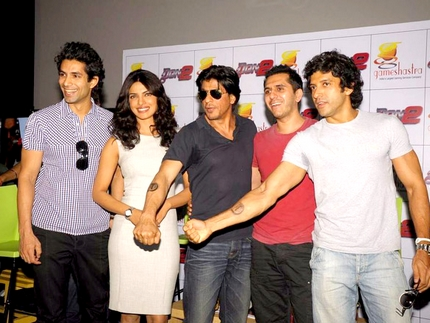
(from left to right) Sahil Shroff, Priyanka Chopra, Shah Rukh Khan, Ritesh Sidhwani and Farhan Akhtar at a promotional event for Don 2 in Mumbai, 2011

The distributors, Reliance Entertainment, bought the rights to Don 2 from Excel Entertainment for ₹850 million (US$8.8 million) and spent another ₹220 million (US$2.3 million) on prints and marketing. Zee Entertainment Enterprises acquired the satellite rights for ₹370 million (US$3.8 million). Distribution rights in Tamil Nadu and Kerala were bought by Sudha Screen's Sreeraj for an undisclosed price. The music rights of Don 2 were sold to T-Series for ₹100 million (US$1.0 million). The theatrical trailer and poster for Don 2 were released with Zindagi Na Milegi Dobara. A second trailer was released online on 24 October 2011. The film previewed at the Dubai International Film Festival. The producers collaborated with McDonald's and Café Coffee Day in 20 cities to provide free Internet access with Wi-Fi in their stores so that viewers could watch songs in 3D on their computers.

The producers decided to publicize the dialogue from Don 2 by releasing 10 lines delivered by Don as "Don Says...": one line each Friday from 15 October until the film's release on 23 December. The lines were released simultaneously across all media platforms: television, print, radio, Internet and mobile. The filmmakers also released a limited-edition toy version. The toy, Shahrukh Khan dressed as Don, is the first bobblehead of a Bollywood star. The cast, director and producers embarked on a multi-city tour across India (including Patna) to promote the film. Interrupted by security problems, the tour resumed from Nagpur to Ahmedabad, Hyderabad and other cities.

In October 2011 a comic book based on Don 2, Don: The Origin, was published that was about Don's past. Excel Entertainment collaborated with India's largest video-game company, Gameshastra, on a console game. The firm developed a third-person action-adventure console game in which the player performs actions similar to Don's in the film. A social game, Don – The Social Mobsters Game (developed by Mango Games), was launched on Facebook. It is available on Android and PSN for PlayStation 3 platforms. Sidhwani said, "This is the first time a game is based on an Indian film that will be launched on four platforms. For an iconic character like Don, I think this was the best way to keep the hysteria going amongst his fans." A PlayStation 2 game, Don 2: The King is Back, was released in India in February 2013 to tie in with the film, also serving as the final PAL game for the console. Mobile video games were also Fugu Mobile and included Don 2: The Pursuit (a racing game) and Don 2: Prison Break and Don 2: Eliminate Vardhan.

== Release ==
Don 2 was released worldwide 23 December 2011 on 3,105 screens in the domestic market, including 500 prints in 3D, and on 650 screens in 40 countries. The dubbed versions in Telugu and Tamil were released with the Hindi version. The second phase of the film's international release began in January 2012 in 84 countries. From 9 February 2012 to 19 February 2012, Don 2 was screened at the World Premiere Cinema theatre during the 62nd Berlin International Film Festival. Reliance Entertainment obtained a "John Doe" order from the Delhi High Court allowing it to serve cease-and-desist notices on film pirates.

A month before Don 2's release, Nariman Films, producers of Don, sent a legal notice to Reliance and Excel Entertainment about the sequel. According to the notice, Nariman had given the rights to Excel Entertainment in perpetuity for Don alone. On 19 December, a week before Don 2's release, the Bombay High Court refused to stay the film's release; the court's ruling considered the film's scheduled release on 21 December overseas and 23 December in India, for which many theaters had been booked.

The smoking scenes in the film came with a disclaimer per Health Ministry's advice to the producers. The DVD was released on 7 February 2012 with two different versions, Blu-ray and a special feature releasing on 10 April and 24 May.

== Reception ==
=== Critical response ===
Don 2 received positive reviews from critics, receiving praise for its story, cinematography, production design, soundtrack, background score, action sequences and performances of the cast.

As of June 2020, the film holds a 63% approval rating on review aggregator site Rotten Tomatoes, based on 16 reviews, with an average rating of 6.68 out of 10. Nikhat Kazmi of The Times of India rated the film 4 stars out of 5 and called it "a classic action/crime thriller that doesn't let go, even for a moment. More importantly, the plot has been finely crafted, with every twist and turn falling into place like a complicated albeit neat little jigsaw." Rachit Gupta of Filmfare also rated the film 4 stars out of 5, and praised the performances by Khan, Chopra and Irani, remarking "They carry the film through its flat moments. It's not very taut, but Don 2 serves up enough thrills in the finale and that alone makes it worth a watch." Priya Joshi of Digital Spy gave the film 4 out of 5, praising its dramatic conclusion which she thought was brilliantly executed, and wrote that it "is a thoroughly exhilarating action-fest, fashioned in a Bollywood-style – and a shot of adrenaline amidst the usual elf-inspired festive film fare."

A review carried by The Express Tribune called the film "a visual masterpiece", adding that "it sets a very high benchmark for future Indian action films." Taran Adarsh of Bollywood Hungama gave the film 3.5 out of 5, feeling that the second half took the film to another level, and wrote "Akhtar chooses an entirely new concept, garnishes it with classic action, stunning visuals, giving it an international look and feel". Aniruddha Guha of Daily News and Analysis gave 3 out of 5 complimenting Khan's performance and action sequences, which he thought made the film work.

Among the overseas reviewers, David DeWitt of The New York Times called it the "slick cousin" of "Mission: Impossible and Ocean's Eleven".

== Box office ==
=== Domestic ===
Don 2 was made with a production cost of ₹760 million (US$7.9 million) excluding SRK's acting fee with shares in profits which is ₹650 million (US$6.7 million). On its first day, Don 2 had 80-percent occupancy levels throughout India. In multiplexes its occupancy level was 75%-80% percent and 70–75 percent in single-screen theatres. The film grossed ₹147 million (US$1.5 million) from its Hindi version, in the process becoming the third-highest opening-day grossing Indian film (fourth-highest for the Hindi version) and the highest opening-day grossing film on a non-holiday Friday. The film increased its earnings by about 20–25 percent in high-end cinemas during its second and third days, aided by a sizeable increase in multiplex revenue. Over the weekend, Don 2 grossed ₹470 million (US$4.9 million) from its Hindi version and another ₹15 million (US$160,000) from its Tamil and Telugu versions. It held well the following week, collecting a total of ₹700 million (US$7.3 million) by the end of its first week. During the film's second weekend, Don 2 grossed ₹145 million (US$1.5 million) from its Hindi version. The film held well during its second week, declining 62 percent and collecting ₹270 million (US$2.8 million) from its Hindi version and thus taking its two-week total to ₹970 million (US$10 million). The second-week total of Don 2 was the second-highest of 2011, after Ready. By the end of its theatrical run the Hindi version of Don 2 grossed ₹1.06 billion (US$11 million) in India and regional versions added a further ₹60 million for a grand total of ₹1.12 billion (US$12 million) including Tamil and Telugu, making it the highest-grossing Bollywood film of 2011.

=== International ===
Don 2 was released overseas in two phases, with most major markets covered in the first phase. The film set several records on its opening day. It grossed $550,000 from 164 theatres in the United States. In the United Kingdom, Don 2's revenue debuted in the top ten, earning $527,000 in three days from 76 theatres; in the Middle East, the film grossed $930,000 in two days. It broke the record for the highest single-day revenue in Australia ($62,000), grossing $136,000 in Australia, New Zealand and Fiji during the first two days of its run.

The film grossed ₹16.9 million (US$180,000) during its first week in Pakistan, breaking all previous records. Don 2 grossed ₹371 million (US$3.9 million) over the weekend, and ₹504 million (US$5.2 million) during its first week. It set a record for the all-time biggest opening week for a Hindi film in North America, earning $2.64 million. The film was the highest-grossing Bollywood film overseas in 2011. During the second phase of its release, which began in February 2012, Don 2 earned $112,027 in Germany and $5,041 in Austria. It grossed $11.24 million on the overseas market and was the third highest-grossing Bollywood film overseas at that time, after My Name Is Khan and 3 Idiots.

== Accolades ==
Award	Date	Category	Recipient(s) and nominee(s)	Result	Ref.
BIG Star Entertainment Awards	2012	Most Entertaining Actor in an Action Film – Male	Shah Rukh Khan	Nominated	
BIG Star Entertainment Awards	2012	Most Entertaining Actor in an Action Film – Female	Priyanka Chopra	Nominated	
ETC Bollywood Business Awards	2012	Top Grosser of the Year	Don 2	Nominated	
ETC Bollywood Business Awards	2012	Most Profitable Director	Farhan Akhtar	Nominated	
ETC Bollywood Business Awards	2012	Most Popular First Look of a Film	Don 2	Won	
Filmfare Awards	29 January 2012	Best Film	Don 2	Nominated	
Filmfare Awards	29 January 2012	Best Director	Farhan Akhtar	Nominated	
Filmfare Awards	29 January 2012	Best Actor	Shah Rukh Khan	Nominated	
Filmfare Awards	29 January 2012	Best Action	Matthias Barsch	Won	
Filmfare Awards	29 January 2012	Best Sound Design	Nakul Kamte	Won	
IIFA Awards	9 June 2012	Best Actor	Shah Rukh Khan	Nominated	
IIFA Awards	9 June 2012	Best Villain	Boman Irani	Nominated	
Lions Gold Awards		Favourite Actor in a Leading Role – Male	Shah Rukh Khan	Won	
Lions Gold Awards		Favourite Actor in a Leading Role – Female	Priyanka Chopra	Won	
National Media Network Film & TV Awards		Best Director	Farhan Akhtar	Won	
Producers Guild Film Awards		Best Actor in a Leading Role	Shah Rukh Khan	Nominated	
Producers Guild Film Awards		Best Entertainer of the Year – Male	Shah Rukh Khan	Won	
Producers Guild Film Awards		Best Entertainer of the Year – Female	Priyanka Chopra	Won	
Producers Guild Film Awards		Best Sound Design	Nakul Kamte	Nominated	
Producers Guild Film Awards		Best Sound Mixing	Nakul Kamte, Debajit Changmai	Nominated	
Producers Guild Film Awards		Best Special Effects	Prasad Sutar	Nominated	
Screen Awards		Best Actor	Shah Rukh Khan	Nominated	
Screen Awards		Best Actor (Popular Choice)	Shah Rukh Khan	Won	
Screen Awards		Best Actress (Popular Choice)	Priyanka Chopra	Nominated	
Screen Awards		Jodi No. 1	Shah Rukh Khan, Priyanka Chopra	Won	
Screen Awards		Best Action	Matthias Barsch	Nominated	
Screen Awards		Best Special Effects	Prasad Sutar, Viral Thakkar	Nominated	
Stardust Awards		Best Film	Don 2	Nominated	
Stardust Awards		Best Director	Farhan Akhtar	Nominated	
Stardust Awards		Actor of the Year – Male	Shah Rukh Khan	Nominated	
Stardust Awards		Actor of the Year – Female	Priyanka Chopra	Nominated	
Stardust Awards		Best Actor – Thriller/Action	Shah Rukh Khan	Nominated	
Stardust Awards		Best Actress – Thriller/Action	Priyanka Chopra	Nominated	
Zee Cine Awards		Best Film	Don 2	Nominated	
Zee Cine Awards		Best Director	Farhan Akhtar	Nominated	
Zee Cine Awards		Best Actor – Male	Shah Rukh Khan	Nominated	
Zee Cine Awards		Best Actor – Male (Critics)	Shah Rukh Khan	Won	

== Future ==
About a sequel, Shah Rukh Khan said: "It would be great to revisit Don after some time. I’ve told Farhan that we could take 60 days out of our schedule and make a Don 3. But we need a script first, one that could take the last 10 minutes of Don 2 forward to another differently exciting thriller." Farhan Akhtar also expressed a desire to take the story forward, and said he was fascinated by the character of Don. However, the filmmaker wanted to explore other genres without restriction and added that he was currently focusing on his acting career.

In August 2014, it was reported that Farhan Akhtar planned to play a role in the film. In October 2015, Akhtar said that Don 3 will go on floors by late 2016. However, the film is at the scripting stage. It has also been reported that Katrina Kaif will replace Priyanka Chopra in the next installment. But the makers denied this, stating that the only constant in the third installment will be dependent on Don, the rest of the characters, and the script.

In May 2023, news articles reported that Farhan Akhtar was finishing the script for Don 3. The third installment, Don 3, was officially announced in August 2023 by Farhan Akhtar and Excel Entertainment, with Ranveer Singh replacing Shah Rukh Khan in the role of Don. But by 2026, Singh reportedly walked out of the film, citing creative disagreements.

== See also ==
- List of highest-grossing Indian films
