= Sahil Shroff =

Indian model and actor (born 1982)

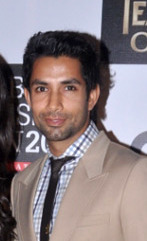
- Shroff at India's 50 Best Dressed Men, 2011
- Born: 17 October 1982 (age 44); India
- Occupations: Actor, model
- Height: 6 ft (183 cm)

Sahil Shroff (born 17 October 1982) is an Indian model and actor who made his debut in Hindi film Don 2: The King is Back.

== Early life ==
Sahil comes from a Sindhi family and grew up in Australia. He did his master's degree in information technology, pursued management studies in Australia and worked graveyard shifts as a bouncer in the nightclubs there. He then moved to Mumbai and has been modelling full-time. His enviable physique and ability to carry off clothes got him noticed in the modelling circles.

== Career ==
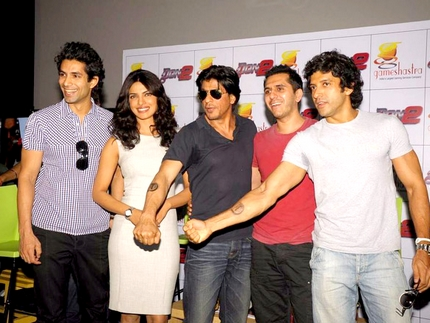
(On left) Sahil Shroff, at a promotional event for the film Don in Mumbai along with co-stars Chopra, Khan, Sidhwani and Akhtar.

Sahil is best known as a contestant on the first season of the reality television competition The Amazing Race Asia, from 2006 to 2007. He has also done many TV commercials including HCL Infosystems, Tata Indica, Lux and Cadbury's Eclairs, and walked for designers like Manish Malhotra, Vikram Phadnis, Narendra Kumar and JJ Valaya. He took acting and voice lessons from veterans like Anupam Kher before walking into films.

In 2011, he made his Bollywood debut playing a supporting role in Farhan Akhtar's sequel Don 2. The film stars Shah Rukh Khan, Priyanka Chopra, Boman Irani and Lara Dutta. Sahil plays a young cop Arjun, who lends a helping hand to co-star Priyanka Chopra in her quest to chase the wily antagonist. The film released on 23 December 2011 and had rocked the box office by grossing ₹484 million (US$5.0 million) on the opening weekend.

In 2021, he participated in Bigg Boss 15 as a contestant.

== Filmography ==
Year	Title	Role	Notes
2006	The Amazing Race Asia 1	Contestant	Reality Show
2011	Don 2: The King is Back	Arjun	
2014	Shaadi Ke Side Effects		
2017	Dear Maya	Rahul	
2019–2020	Baarish	Rishi Mehta	Web Series
2021	Bigg Boss 15	Contestant	Evicted (Day 8)
2024	Call Me Bae	Mukul Sawla	Web series
2025	Single Papa	Ayaan	Web series
