= Nariman Irani =

Indian film cinematographer (?-1977)

Nariman A. Irani
- Irani with Amitabh Bachchan on the sets of Don (1978)
- Born: India
- Died: 10 December 1977; Bombay, Maharashtra
- Occupations: Cinematographer; Film producer
- Organization: Nariman Films
- Known for: Don (1978)
- Spouse: Salma Irani
- Children: Humera Ibrahim, Nadeem Irani, and Nadir Irani

Nariman A. Irani (? – 10 December 1977) was a Bollywood cinematographer and film producer. He is best known for producing Don (1978) made under his banner Nariman Films and for his work as cinematographer in Chhailla Babu (1977). He died in an accident before Don was completed; eventually the film was a big hit and led to the Don (franchise).

As a cinematographer he is known for films including Talash, Saraswatichandra and Phool Aur Patthar, Roti Kapada Aur Makaan and Chhailla Babu. He won the National Film Award for Best Cinematography (B & W) for Saraswatichandra (1968), he also won the Filmfare Award for Best Cinematography in the same year.

Irani, while working on Chhailla Babu as a cinematographer, decided to borrow most of the plot of Chhailla Babu and shared a modified story idea to Chandra Barot, who made the new modified story as the 1978 film Don. While Don was still under production he suffered a serious hip bone injury when, after a sudden cloudburst in November 1977, a wall fell on him while he was preparing to take a shot for another film at Rajkamal Kalamandir studios, Mumbai during the making of Manoj Kumar's Kranti. He was hospitalised, but died a few days later. The rest of the cinematography and production was completed by director Chandra Barot with support from the cast and crew.

== Personal life ==
Irani was a Parsi. His wife Salma was a Muslim.

== Legacy ==
His home banner Nariman Films was revived 18 years later by his sons, Nadir and Nadeem, with Suniel Shetty-starrer Shashtra (1996).

== Filmography ==
=== As a cinematographer ===
- Sone Ki Chidiya (1958)
- Manzil (1960)
- Rustom Sohrab (1963)
- Phool Aur Patthar (1966)
- Bahu Begum (1967)
- Saraswatichandra (1968)
- Talash (1969)
- Shor (1972)
- Roti Kapada Aur Makaan (1974)
- Chhailla Babu (1977)
- Immaan Dharam (1977)
- Don (1978)
- Dostana (1980)

=== As a film producer ===
- Zindagi Zindagi (1972)
- Don (1978)
