= Billa (2009 film) =

- Theatrical release poster
- Directed by: Meher Ramesh
- Screenplay by: Meher Ramesh
- Based on: Billa (2007) by Vishnuvardhan (director) and Salim–Javed
- Produced by: D. Narendra; Prabodh
- Starring: Prabhas; Krishnam Raju; Anushka Shetty; Namitha; Rahman; Kelly Dorjee
- Cinematography: Soundarrajan
- Edited by: Marthand K. Venkatesh
- Music by: Mani Sharma
- Production company: Gopi Krishna Movies
- Distributed by: Creative Commercials
- Release date: 3 April 2009
- Running time: 154 minutes
- Country: India
- Language: Telugu
- Budget: ₹12 crore
- Box office: est. ₹26 crore

Billa is a 2009 Indian Telugu-language action thriller film directed by Meher Ramesh. The film stars Prabhas in a dual role alongside Krishnam Raju, Anushka Shetty, Namitha, Rahman, and Kelly Dorjee. The soundtrack was composed by Mani Sharma. It is the remake of 2007 Tamil language film Billa, which itself is a remake of 1980 film Billa, and that itself was a remake of 1978 Hindi film Don. The film follows the titular criminal's lookalike, a thief from Andhra Pradesh who replaces the don in Malaysia after he died in a high-speed chase. Tasked with infiltrating the mafia, he embarks on a covert mission to gather intelligence on a major weapons deal.

The film began its production in October 2008 and was released and distributed worldwide by Creative Commercials. It received mixed reviews but emerged as a success at the box office.

== Plot ==
The story begins with an underworld don Billa hiding and operating out of Malaysia, hiding from Interpol's international criminal list. Krishnamoorthy, an ACP working for the Interpol, has spent the last few years looking for Billa, leaving behind a life in India. During a chase with the police, Billa is severely wounded after an accident, and dies in front of the ACP. The ACP then secretly holds a funeral for Billa. Interpol Officer Dharmendra is assigned to work with the ACP to capture the elusive Billa as no-one knows of Billa's death. The ACP keeps the death of Billa as a secret even from his fellow officers, and tracks down a look-alike called Katikaranga (Ranga), a petty thief based in Visakhapatnam. He asks Ranga to infiltrate Billa's gang by pretending to be Billa. In return, he will make sure that the children Ranga adopted, Lakshmi and Sreenu, get a proper education in Hyderabad.

The ACP trains Ranga and sends him back to Billa's gang as a person who has lost his memory. Slowly Ranga starts to learn about Billa's gang and even speaks to Devil, Billa's boss, on the phone. He also gets attracted to one of the girl members of the gang, Maya (Anushka Shetty) who had been secretly plotting to kill Billa as he killed her brother Vikram and his fiancée Priya. Ranga then provides a pen drive with the secret information of the crime network to the ACP, but he is about to be killed by Maya who thinks he is Billa. At this juncture, the ACP arrives and tells her that he is Ranga and not Billa. Since then, she begins to assist Ranga and the ACP in their mission and soon falls in love with Ranga. Later before a party, Ranga secretly provides information to the ACP about a meeting of Billa's network, and Lisa, Billa's girlfriend, overhears his conversation. She challenges Ranga, but in the fight, he accidentally kills her. A shootout occurs at the party, and the ACP is secretly killed by someone, leaving his gun behind. Ranga finds the ACP's body and the gun, but is taken into the custody of the police team, now headed by Interpol Officer Dharmendra. He argues during interrogation that he is Ranga and not Billa to Dharmendra. Ranga mentions a piece of evidence – the pen drive, which may prove his innocence, but the pen drive is nowhere to be found.

Unable to prove his innocence, he escapes from a police van. He phones Dharmendra and asks him to meet at the Aero bridge. Here it is revealed that Dharmendra is none other than the Underworld Crime Don Devil, and he is the one who killed ACP Krishnamoorthy. While escaping from Devil's gang, he meets Officer Adithya, who apparently had the pen drive all along, and strikes a deal with Ranga to get hold of Devil. Meanwhile, Maya has been kidnapped by Devil after she tried to defend Ranga from Devil. Maya is tied up and kept in a car with her mouth taped shut. Ranga decides to pose as Billa to Devil, and provides Russian explosives to an arms dealer Rashid, who insisted on dealing with Billa. Enraged at being slighted by Rashid, following the completion of the deal, Devil and his henchman Ranjith fight with Ranga. Soon the police arrived and Devil, posing as Dharmendra, asks the police to arrest Ranga as Billa but gets shot by the squad of police and dies as the police have wired the entire conversation between Devil and Ranga, thus proving Ranga's innocence.

It ends with Ranga returning to Visakhapatnam with Maya, and deciding to start a school and college there with the government reward given to him and four suitcases of cash he stole from Billa's estate in Malaysia.

== Cast ==
- Prabhas in a dual role as:
  - David Billa, a dreaded gangster and powerful don
  - Ranga, a small-time petty thief
- Krishnam Raju as ACP Krishnamurthy, Interpol officer
- Anushka Shetty as Maya, Ranga's love interest
- Namitha as Lisa, Billa's love interest
- Rahman as Devil / Interpol officer Dharmendra (fake)
- Riyaz Khan as Hassan Bhai
- Johnny Tri Nguyen as Lee Khai Tom
- Nawab Shah as Salman Khalid Bhai
- Adithya as Inspector Aditya
- Kelly Dorjee as Shethan
- Supreeth as Ranjit, Billa's right hand and secondary antagonist
- Ali as Shankaram, Ranga's friend
- Prabhas Sreenu as a waiter in Shankaram's restaurant
- Phani as Ranga's friend
- Praveen as Ranga's friend

Cameo appearances

- Hansika Motwani as Priya
- Subbaraju as Vikram, Priya's fiancé, Maya's brother
- Jayasudha as Janaki, Krishnamurthy's wife

== Production ==
=== Development and casting ===
During the making of Kantri (2008), actor N. T. Rama Rao Jr. expressed his intention of remaking Billa (2007) in Telugu following his grandfather N. T. Rama Rao's Yugandhar (1979). Meher Ramesh, however, felt that Rama Rao Jr. would not fit into the role at that stage of his career. Ramesh also explored the idea of making the film with Ravi Teja, but dropped the idea due to budget constraints. Ramesh later approached Prabhas who was excited to work for the project. Prabhas' uncle, Krishnam Raju, was also on board for a pivotal role, marking their first on-screen collaboration. Ramesh cast Anushka Shetty as the female lead. Shetty worked for over two months to slim down for the role. Hansika Motwani readily agreed to act in the film when suggested by Ramesh. Namitha, like Shetty, lost weight before signing the film. Meher wanted either Sameer Reddy or Chota K. Naidu for the cinematography, but due to non-availability of dates from the both of them, Soundararajan was chosen instead, marking his debut in Telugu cinema.

=== Filming ===
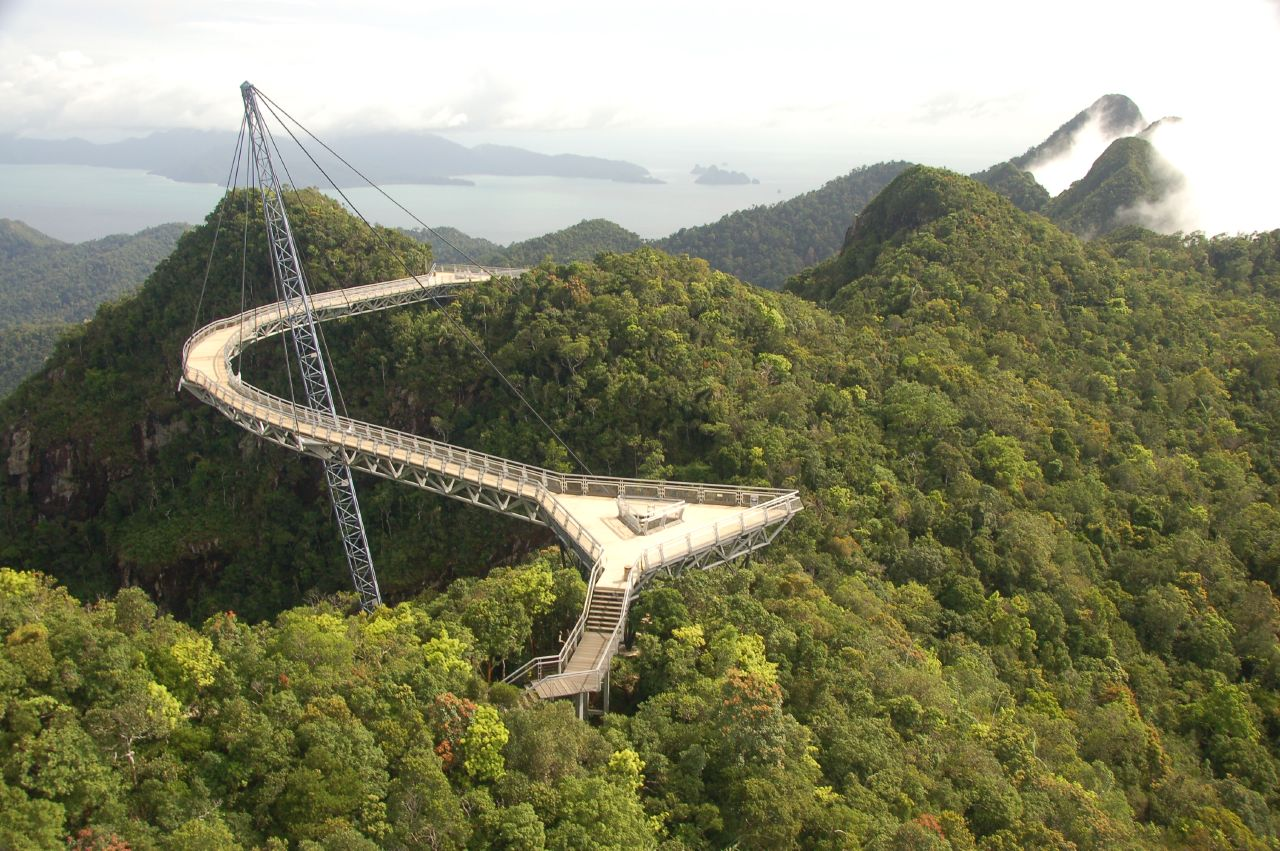
Filming was also at the Langkawi sky bridge.

The film was launched at Gopikrishna Pictures office on October 9, 2008. The film was shot extensively in Malaysia for three months. Filming was completed in 104 working days.

== Music ==
The film's score and soundtrack was composed by Mani Sharma. The audio launch of Billa was held at Shilpakala Vedika on 18 March 2009 with Dasari Narayana Rao, S. S. Rajamouli, V. V. Vinayak, Gopichand and Allu Arjun as guests. Dasari Narayana Rao launched the music. The audio rights was bagged by Lahari Music. The song "My Name is Billa" was later re-used by Sharma for the Tamil film Sura (2010) as "Naan Nadanthaal Adhiradi" and "Bommali " as "Thanjavoor Jillakkaari".

Track listing
| No. | Title | Lyrics | Artist(s) | Length |
|---|---|---|---|---|
| 1. | "Hariloranga Hari" | Ramajogayya Sastry | Mano, Ranjith, Kannan | 4:07 |
| 2. | "Ellora Shilpanni" | Ramajogayya Sastry | Rita | 4:06 |
| 3. | "Billa Theme Song" | Meher Ramesh | Ranjith, Rahul Nambiar | 4:30 |
| 4. | "Bommali" | Ramajogayya Sastry | Hemachandra, Malavika | 5:15 |
| 5. | "Ne Pataasu" | Bhaskarabhatla | Rita, Rahul Nambiar | 3:59 |
| 6. | "My Name is Billa" | Ramajogayya Sastry | Ranjith, Naveen Madhav | 3:57 |
| Total length: | | | | 25:54 |

== Release and reception ==
The film was released on 3 April 2009.

Jeevi of Idlebrain stated "First half of the film is alright" but found the second half "a little disappointing" and "prolonged", while also stating "Prabhas’s makeover and styling as Billa and good production values" as positive points but "on the flip side, the second half should have been effectively handled." Times of India wrote "If director Meher Ramesh believes that pretty damsels, exotic locales, swanky cars and stylised shots are the ingredients for a blockbuster, then he is grossly mistaken. Billa, the Telugu remake of Don, has more style than substance, and though Prabhas gives an impressive performance as a suave ruthless don". A critic from Bangalore Mirror wrote that "Ramesh’s Billa is an extremely ‘stylish’ movie by Telugu standards. Most parts have been shot at scenic locales in Malaysia. Prabhas has toned his body well and is a treat to watch".

A re-mastered 4K version was re-released in theatres on 2 October 2022, on the occasion of Prabhas's 43rd birthday. The film is releasing in over 70 locations across the United States. This is the most extensive list of theatres and record-level theatres among re-released Telugu movies.
