= Don (2006 Hindi film) =

2006 Indian film by Farhan Akhtar

Don: The Chase Begins Again
- Theatrical release poster
- Directed by: Farhan Akhtar
- Written by: Farhan Akhtar
- Based on: Don (1978) by Salim–Javed
- Produced by: Ritesh Sidhwani
- Starring: Shah Rukh Khan; Priyanka Chopra; Arjun Rampal; Isha Koppikar; Boman Irani; Pavan Malhotra; Rajesh Khattar; Om Puri; Kareena Kapoor
- Cinematography: K. U. Mohanan
- Edited by: Anand Subaya
- Music by: Shankar–Ehsaan–Loy
- Production company: Excel Entertainment
- Distributed by: UTV Motion Pictures
- Release date: 20 October 2006
- Running time: 169 minutes
- Country: India
- Language: Hindi.
- Budget: ₹38 crore
- Box office: ₹106.34 crore

Don (subtitled as The Chase Begins Again) is a 2006 Indian Hindi-language action thriller film co-written and directed by Farhan Akhtar. Produced by Excel Entertainment, the film stars Shah Rukh Khan as the titular anti-hero and Priyanka Chopra as Roma, while Arjun Rampal, Isha Koppikar, Boman Irani, Pavan Malhotra, and Om Puri appear in supporting roles. Kareena Kapoor Khan makes a guest appearance. A remake of the 1978 film of the same title, it follows the titular criminal's look-alike who has been sent on a clandestine mission to impersonate Don after he is wounded in a chase, and to gather intelligence on the drug mafia.

Akhtar sought to remake the film with a contemporary style, while paying homage to the original and cinema of the 1970s. After acquiring the remake rights, he developed the project as a modern reinterpretation of the earlier film. Akhtar co-wrote the screenplay with his father Javed Akhtar, who co-wrote the original script with Salim Khan. While retaining the basic plot, the remake introduced several changes, including an international setting and different climax. Principal photography began in Mumbai, and later moved to Malaysia, where most of the film was shot. The soundtrack was composed by Shankar–Ehsaan–Loy, with lyrics by Javed Akhtar.

Don: The Chase Begins Again was released on 20 October 2006, coinciding with Diwali. The film received generally positive reviews from critics who praised the action sequences, soundtrack, production design, cinematography, and performances of Khan and Chopra. It was a major commercial success, grossing ₹106 crore (US$11 million) worldwide against its budget of ₹40 crore (US$4.2 million), emerging as the fifth highest-grossing Hindi films of 2006. The climax was particularly well received by critics and audiences, helping the film be viewed as a distinct reinterpretation rather than a remake of the original.

Don won Best Asian Film at the Neuchâtel International Fantastic Film Festival. The film also received 9 nominations at the 52nd Filmfare Awards, including Best Film and Best Actor (Khan).

A sequel titled Don 2 was released on 23 December 2011.

== Plot ==
An illicit drug trade based in Kuala Lumpur, Malaysia, is run by cartel leader Singhania, one of two lieutenants who worked under the deceased kingpin Boris. Boris made his fortune by selling arms and ammunition to terror groups, using the money to purchase drugs in Asia and sell them across Europe. He is believed to have been murdered by Singhania himself after deciding to hand over control of the business to the other lieutenant, Vardhaan. Following Boris's death, Vardhaan disappeared and is presumed to have been killed by Singhania. The cartel's operations in Kuala Lumpur are handled by Don, Singhania's ruthless manager. An elite Indian police team, led by Deputy Commissioner of Police D'Silva, is assigned to dismantle the cartel and arrest Don. As part of the operation, D'Silva briefs the Malaysian Police about the syndicate and its activities.

When Ramesh, a senior member of the gang, secretly attempts to leave the syndicate, Don kills him. Seeking revenge for her fiancée's murder, Kamini sets out to trap Don by posing as a woman who is interested in him while secretly helping the police. However, Don discovers the ruse and kills her before escaping. Ramesh's sister, Roma, decides to avenge their deaths. She successfully infiltrates Don's gang by demonstrating martial arts proficiency. Meanwhile, following a police raid in India, Don is seriously injured in a high-speed chase and falls into a coma. With Don secretly incapacitated, D'Silva recruits Vijay, a carefree street performer in Mumbai, who bears a striking resemblance to Don. Vijay agrees to help with the operation on the condition that D'Silva pays for the education of Deepu, an orphaned boy in his care. To make Vijay look more convincing, D'Silva arranges for him to undergo minor surgery to replicate Don’s scars.

Meanwhile, Jasjit, a former IT consultant and Deepu's father, is released from prison. Years earlier, an unknown operative had blackmailed Jasjit into stealing industrial diamonds by holding his wife hostage. When D'Silva arrested Jasjit, he refused to believe his account and shot him in the leg, leaving him permanently disabled. Jasjit's wife was later murdered. Following his release, Jasjit vows to take revenge on D'Silva. At the hospital, the real Don is believed to have died of heart failure. D'Silva then begins the undercover operation, sending Vijay into the cartel disguised as Don, who is supposedly suffering from retrograde amnesia. Vijay is instructed to locate a computer disc containing details of the cartel's financial network and operations. Meanwhile, D'Silva is revealed to be Vardhaan, Boris's other lieutenant, who had been presumed dead. He decides to maintain his disguise until the disc is recovered. Vijay eventually recovers the disc, but Roma confronts him, intending to avenge her brother and Kamini's deaths. D'Silva intervenes and reveals Vijay's true identity to Roma.

Vijay hands the disc to D'Silva, who prepares to kill him, but changes his mind after Vijay reveals that Singhania is planning to visit Kuala Lumpur for a meeting. D'Silva subsequently organises a raid on Singhania's club, where he poisons Singhania, who later dies. During the ensuing shoot-out, Vijay is arrested, while D'Silva is seemingly killed in an explosion. With D'Silva presumed dead, the Malaysian police have no one to confirm Vijay's true identity and prepare to put him on trial. Meanwhile, members of the cartel discover that Vijay is an impostor and plot to kill him. While being transported on a prisoner transport plane, Vijay executes a daring skydiving escape. He reunites with Roma, and the two set out to recover the disc and prove his innocence.

Jasjit breaks into D'Silva's apartment and retrieves the disc. Shortly afterwards, he receives a ransom call demanding the disc in exchange for Deepu, who has been kidnapped. When Jasjit arrives at the meeting point, he discovers that D'Silva is still alive and is actually Vardhaan. It is revealed that Vardhaan had been living under a false identity, had blackmailed Jasjit years earlier, and was responsible for killing Singhania. His ultimate aim was to take control of the Asian underworld. Jasjit rescues Deepu, and the pair reunite with Vijay and Roma. The group then join forces with Interpol officer Inspector Vishal Malik to track down Vardhaan. The confrontation leads to a final battle at an abandoned high-rise, where Vijay defeats Vardhaan in a hand-to-hand combat, allowing Malik to arrest him.

An injured Vijay is cleared of all charges. As he is being taken away in an ambulance, Roma confesses her feelings for him, which he reciprocates. However, after the ambulance leaves, Roma realises that Vijay had accidentally given her the wrong evidence disc. She also recalls a particular phrase he had used, which was identical to the one Don had said when they first met, leading her to suspect that something was not right. In a final revelation, it is revealed that Don had never died. After regaining consciousness in the hospital, he overheard D'Silva’s plan involving Vijay, and secretly switched places with him on the operating table. Don had also fatally injected Vijay with diazepam, causing his death. He had subsequently been impersonating Vijay, who himself was pretending to be Don, throughout the operation. Don also handed the authorities a duplicate of the original disc, keeping the real one for himself. With Vardhaan incarcerated, and the police believing him to be dead, Don boards a private aircraft with his associate Anita, having secured control over the entire Asian drug cartel.

== Cast ==
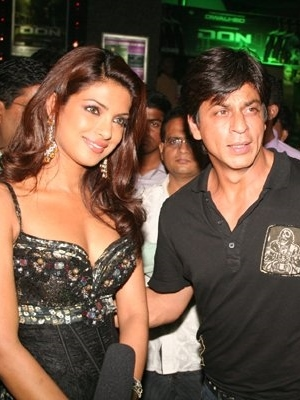
Lead stars Chopra and Khan at the film's premiere, 2006

- Shah Rukh Khan in a dual role as
  - Mark Donald aka Don
  - Vijay, Don's lookalike
- Priyanka Chopra as Roma Bhagat
- Arjun Rampal as Jasjit Ahuja aka JJ
- Isha Koppikar as Anita Sinha
- Boman Irani as Vardhaan / DCP D'Silva (fake)
- Om Puri as Interpol Officer Vishal Malik
- Kareena Kapoor as Kamini Arora / Sonia
- Pavan Malhotra as Naarang
- Rajesh Khattar as Singhania, Don's boss
- Tanay Chheda as Deepu Ahuja, JJ's son
- Nissar Khan as Haatim Qureshi
- Diwakar Pundir as Ramesh Bhagat
- Shakeel Khan as Mac
- Kuldeep Sareen as Jairaj
- Micky Makhija as Mr. Joshi
- Satyajit Sharma as Mystery Man
- Shakun Batra as Migrant Worker
- Bikramjeet Kanwarpal as Dr. Ashok
- Chunky Pandey as T. J. (special appearance)
- Sushma Reddy as Geeta Ahuja, JJ's wife (special appearance)

== Production ==
=== Development ===
Farhan Akhtar conceived the idea to remake the 1978 film of the same name after listening to a remixed version of a song from the original film. In early 2005, media started reporting that Akhtar was planning to remake the film, but rather than confirming the news, he revealed that though he was writing the screenplay based on the film, he would take the final decision after completing the script. The director co-wrote the film with his father, Javed Akhtar, who had also written the original film with Salim Khan.

Akhtar revealed that the reason behind the remake was a desire to give a new treatment to "a fantastic film which he enjoyed watching as a child", and create an adaptation that he thought would suit modern times. He found the film a little ahead of its time because of the narration, dialogue, and the writing style, which he deemed modern for the time of its release. Akhtar said, "Don is the one film from that time that in my mind lends itself to being remade today. So today, when you adapt it, it fits very easily into a contemporary space. I think it fits into the modern sensibility of movie viewing." Additionally, he wanted to pay tribute to the stars and makers of the original film, the 1970s era in general, and the films made by Salim–Javed and Amitabh Bachchan.

In order to suit the modern sensibility, several changes were introduced. Akhtar changed a number of aspects of the climax as he felt the original ending was outdated for today's audiences. On the other hand, a number of elements from the original were retained in the new film, notably the background score, two songs, some dialogue, and some situations, all of which Akhtar believed were fine in the original, saying that not including them would be a crime.

=== Casting ===
Akhtar initially wanted Hrithik Roshan for the titular character, after having worked with him on Lakshya (2004). However, Akhtar felt that the character required a more mature actor, saying he wanted "a face that had seen the world and roughed it out." The director said that Roshan's innocence was not right for the role, and instead cast Shah Rukh Khan for the part that had been portrayed by Amitabh Bachchan in the 1978 film. Akhtar believed that Khan was the most suitable for the role, saying, "He has the personality, the style, the flair, the larger than life persona, the sense of humour and the sheer magnetism that this character requires."

In July 2005, Priyanka Chopra was cast to play Roma, a role originally played by Zeenat Aman. Akhtar found Chopra to be perfect for the role, saying, "There is a docile sensuality about her which suits the character." When he offered the role to her, she was excited to play the character and immediately agreed to do the film. Later that month Arjun Rampal and Isha Koppikar joined the cast. While Rampal was cast as Jasjit, played by Pran in the original, after Akshay Kumar turned down the role for being secondary (eventually starring in Akhtar's 2018 production of the sports drama Gold), Koppikar was cast in a completely new role that was not in the original film. In August 2005, Kareena Kapoor was confirmed to appear in the song "Yeh Mera Dil", which had been performed by Helen in the original film.

Khan, Chopra, and Rampal underwent extensive martial arts training from an expert from the Shaolin Temple. The principal cast received training in different kinds of martial arts. Khan revealed that he had always wanted to look the way Amitabh Bachchan had in his films, but he said he gave his own interpretation to the role. After signing to do the film, Chopra was very excited, but a few days later, she became nervous, wondering if she would be able to do justice to the character. Having seen the original film as a teenager, Chopra avoided watching the film again as she did not wanted to imitate Zeenat Aman's portrayal of Roma. She made a conscious effort to give her own look and style to the character.

This was Chopra's first action role, and she was excited to the part, so she wanted to do all the stunts by herself. After Chopra decided to perform her own stunts, Akhtar revealed that he was happy as it gave him the scope to film the fight sequences from different angles. Rampal, in the role of Jasjit, said that he approached his character in a way similar to how Pran had played it in the original but with an emotional graph. Boman Irani, who plays DCP D'Silva, a role performed by Iftekhar in the original film, revealed that he played the role according to what suited the script, but retained some of the dignity from that film.

=== Filming ===
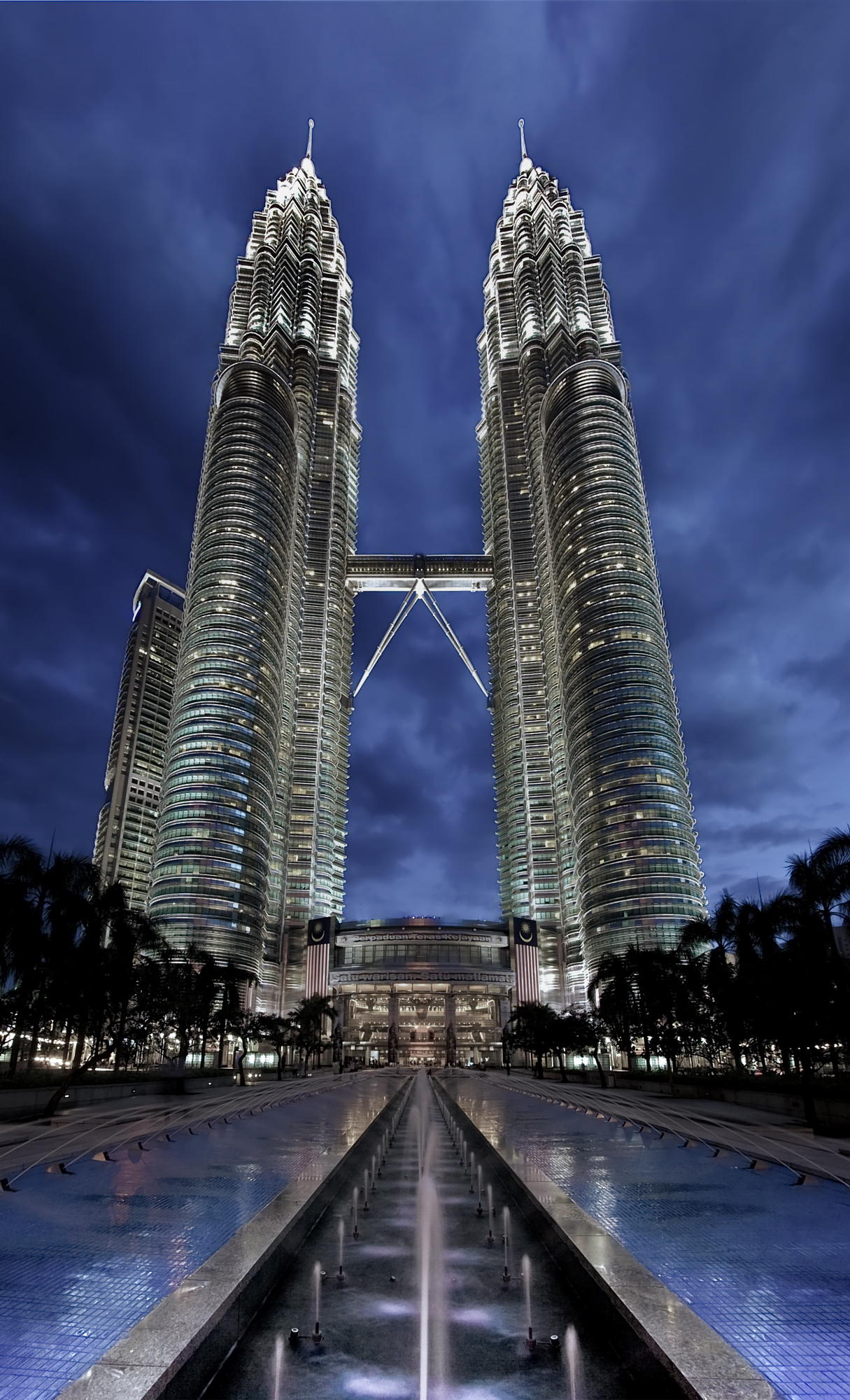
Filming was also at the Petronas Towers.

Principal photography commenced in February 2006 in central Mumbai. Art direction was handled by Aradhana Seth, and the costumes were designed by Aki Narula. Akhtar chose K. U. Mohanan to handle the cinematography after having been impressed by his work in documentaries and TV commercials. To give an authentic feel to the film, scenes were shot on a closed set in actual chawls in real locations. The film was also shot at Film City and Yash Raj Studios. Some filming was done in Paris in March over a 3-day schedule.

The filming moved to Kuala Lumpur, Malaysia, in April 2006 where the majority of the film was shot. 80% of the filming was done in Kuala Lumpur and Langkawi. In Malaysia, filming was done over the course of 70 days at 42 locations including KLCC, Kampung Baru, and Penchala Link, and included more than 1000 extras, all of whom were selected following auditions. Additional filming was done in Singapore. Apparently, the former Prime Minister of Malaysia Mahathir Mohamad, who had previously declined even Hollywood films to be filmed in the Petronas Towers, gave his permission for the crew to film inside his personal office in the Towers. For a scene depicting a media ambush, several real-life journalists from India and Malaysia were hired.

The song "Yeh Mera Dil" was choreographed by Farah Khan. Veteran choreographer Saroj Khan agreed to choreograph the new version of the popular song "Khaike Paan Banaras Waala", which had been choreographed by her mentor P. L. Raj in the original film. The song was filmed in Malaysia on 13 May 2006 with Khan and Chopra. The dancing for other songs was choreographed by Prabhu Deva, Ganesh Hegde, and Rajeev Surti. Hollywood technician Angelo Sahin, the special Effects supervisor behind Mission: Impossible 2 (2000), and aerial stunt co-ordinator Joe Jennings, known for his work in films such as Charlie's Angels (2000), were hired for the action sequences. Filming was also at the Petronas Towers.

== Music ==
The soundtrack was composed by Shankar–Ehsaan–Loy, with lyrics written by Javed Akhtar. The album contains 8 songs: 3 original, 2 remakes of from the original film, a theme, a reprise, and a remix of one of the 3 new songs. The vocals were performed by Shaan, Sunidhi Chauhan, Shankar Mahadevan, Alisha Chinai, Mahalakshmi Iyer, Sonu Nigam, Udit Narayan and MIDIval Punditz. It was released on 26 August 2006 by T-Series.

The soundtrack received positive reviews from music critics, who praised "Aaj Ki Raat", calling it "innovative" and the best song on the album. The recreation of songs from the original film, "Ye Mera Dil" and "Khaike Paan Banaraswala", received mixed reviews. Joginder Tuteja from Bollywood Hungama gave the album a 4 out of 5, noting its success at surprising its listener, and wrote, "Shankar-Ehsaan-Loy do exceedingly well with the soundtrack and establish their supremacy as the composer trio who can give their own even while rearranging the songs from the past." ' Sukanya Verma of Rediff.com was less impressed with the album, calling it "Snazzy, good mix" and writing, "This lavish enterprise has a little bit of everything. An eclectic mix of old, new and everything in between; Don is an unusual presentation of old-wine-in-new-bottle."

The Don soundtrack album was the first Indian soundtrack to be released on iTunes on the same day of its launch or before the public release of physical copies. The music topped charts on a number of platforms in India. It was one of the best-selling Bollywood soundtracks of the year, with 1.5 million units sold according to Box Office India. The song "Aaj Ki Raat" was used by A. R. Rahman in his Grammy and Academy Award-winning soundtrack Slumdog Millionaire (2008).

== Marketing ==
Being a remake of an iconic film, and the star-cast involved, Don was one of the most anticipated films of the year. The first look poster was released in late April 2006, which according to the media hinted at the kind of adaptation the film was going to be. This was followed by another poster in late July 2006, which also revealed the release date of the film. Following the poster reveals, the trailer was released in mid-September. Bollywood Hungama deemed it promising, writing that the "trendy accessories, sleek gadgets, lavish settings, expensive wardrobe and deadly action scenes build the framework of the new Don." To promote the film, the filmmakers teamed up with Hungama Digital Media Entertainment to launch a mobile game based on the film. It was the first multiplayer online game launched for any Bollywood film. The filmmakers also launched popcorn holders of Don before the release film. An 80-page comic book was published and copies were given for free in multiplexes along with the tickets of the film.

== Release ==
=== Theatrical ===
In December 2005, UTV Motion Pictures acquired the overseas rights of the film. Made on a production and marketing budget of ₹400 million, Don was released worldwide on 20 October 2006 in 800 screens during the Diwali festive season, clashing with another Bollywood film Jaan-E-Mann. The film opened to excellent to very good response at the domestic box-office, with an occupancy of 90%.

=== Home media ===
The DVD of the film was released by T-Series Home Entertainment domestically and Internationally by UTV, the film was released on DVDs on 5 December 2006 across all regions in a 2-disc Collector's Edition pack in NTSC format, with several bonus content such as making of the film, bloopers, trailers, deleted scenes, and clap track. It also included a "Don Comic Book." A steel case limited edition DVD was released in January 2007 with the same bonus features. The VCD version was released at the same time. A single-disc DVD pack was also released later. The Blu-ray version was released on 27 April 2011.

== Reception ==
=== Box office ===
Don grossed a first day opening of ₹46 million and ₹141 million on its opening weekend. It also received a good opening in overseas markets with an opening weekend of over $2.2 million. On its opening weekend, the film grossed over ₹302 million worldwide. After its first week, the film took in more than ₹244 million in India. The film grossed $1.1 million in its first week in UK, while the total overseas first week earnings were more than $4.1 million. The film grossed ₹529 million worldwide at the end of first week. The film had a very good hold in its second week, and performed extremely well, even better than that week's new release and collections increased in several centers, with setting new second week highs. After its theatrical run, the film grossed over ₹710 million in India, becoming the fifth highest-grossing Indian film of 2006, and was deemed a "hit". It also grossed over $7.8 million in the overseas territories and was declared a blockbuster. Worldwide, the film grossed over ₹1.06 billion (US$11 million) and was a major commercial success.

=== Critical response ===
Upon release, Don was well received by critics. Mayank Shekhar from Mumbai Mirror gave the film a rating of 4 out of 5 and wrote, "The former was a character-driven, intimate film, albeit a fairly slick thriller, mostly for its screenplay. The latter is a most updated Indian film of the action genre that always calculably concentrates on the new twists, and the turning points, both of which mostly seem cleverer than contrived; ably fitting pieces, the known characters, into a new domino." Raja Sen of Rediff.com felt the film was "conventional and predictable", and complained that the director did not develop his characters. However, Sen was impressed by Chopra's performance and wrote, "[She] handles her role with efficiency, looking every bit the competent woman of action – and a ravishing babe who fills out a skintight white jumpsuit deliciously."

Pratim D. Gupta of The Telegraph gave the film a positive review, noting that the director turned a formula "good defeats bad" film into a modern-day neo-noir film where "bad fights bad", and wrote, "The new Don is more of a remix than the remake with the scratchy edges smoothened out with grunge grooves and blistering beats. Farhan changes the backdrop and the background and yet manages to keep the original sequences and lines." Gupta also praised the acting, "eye-catching locations", cinematography, and production design, and thought that the "breathtaking chase and action sequences" broke new grounds on Indian screens. Bollywood Hungama's Taran Adarsh rated the film a 3 out of 5, praising the performances of the lead actors and writing "Shah Rukh Khan does very well as Don. He enacts the evil character with a flourish. But he fails to carry off the other role [Vijay] with conviction. It looks made up, it doesn't come naturally to him at all. Priyanka Chopra carries off her part with 'lan. The stunt [when she rescues Khan] is bound to win her laurels."

PlanetBollywood.com gave a rating of a 7 out of 10, particularly praising the twist ending, and wrote, "The Don of the 21st century is stylish with flaws, yet, you do enjoy the experience of watching it in the cinema." While labelling the film a "disappointment", film critic Sukanya Verma questioned Akhtar's decision behind remaking an important film. She further criticised Akhtar for taking a fairly simple but engaging storyline, and turning it into a shockingly unimaginative adaptation. Verma also found Khan to be inconsistent in the dual roles. Giving a 1 out of 5, film critic Rajeev Masand panned the film, terming it an exercise in indulgence, and wrote, "Spiffily shot and stylishly packaged, the new Don may wear a new look, but what it's clearly lacking is the raw energy, the unpredictability of Chandra Barot's original thriller."

== Accolades ==
Award	Category	Recipient(s) and nominee(s)	Result	Ref.
1st Asian Film Awards	Best Actor	Shah Rukh Khan	Nominated	
52nd Filmfare Awards	Best Film	Don	Nominated	
52nd Filmfare Awards	Best Actor	Shah Rukh Khan	Nominated	
52nd Filmfare Awards	Best Music Director	Shankar–Ehsaan–Loy	Nominated	
52nd Filmfare Awards	Best Art Direction	Aradhana Seth	Nominated	
52nd Filmfare Awards	Best Cinematography	Mohanan	Nominated	
52nd Filmfare Awards	Best Costume Design	Aki Narula	Nominated	
52nd Filmfare Awards	Best Choreography	Ganesh Acharya (for song "Main Hoon Don")	Nominated	
52nd Filmfare Awards	Best Action	Angelo Samn	Nominated	
52nd Filmfare Awards	Best Special Effects	Red Chillies VFX	Nominated	
8th IIFA Awards	Best Actor	Shah Rukh Khan	Nominated	
Neuchâtel International Fantastic Film Festival	Best Asian Film	Don	Won	

== Sequels ==
A sequel titled Don 2, also directed by Akhtar, was released on 23 December 2011. Khan, Chopra, Irani, and Puri reprise their roles as Don, Roma, Vardhaan, and Malik, respectively.

Post the success of the 2011 film, Farhan Akhtar was reported to work on a sequel with Shah Rukh Khan and Priyanka Chopra, who starred in the prequels. However, Khan and Chopra walked out of the film. Instead, Akhtar decided to move on with a different story and a new cast starring Ranveer Singh and Kiara Advani. The film was officially announced in 2023 by Excel Entertainment, but by 2026, Singh walked out of the film, citing creative disagreements. Advani, too, left the film, following her pregnancy.

== See also ==
- Cypher
