= Shobhraj =

1986 Indian film by J. Sasikumar

- Poster
- Directed by: J. Sasikumar
- Written by: Vijayan Karote
- Story by: Salim–Javed
- Based on: Don by Salim–Javed
- Produced by: P. K. R. Pillai
- Starring: Mohanlal; T. G. Ravi; Madhavi; K. P. Ummer
- Cinematography: N. A. Thara
- Edited by: G. Venkittaraman
- Music by: Gemini (Score); L. Vaidyanathan (Songs)
- Production company: Shirdi Sai Creations
- Distributed by: Shirdi Sai Release
- Release date: 6 December 1986
- Country: India
- Language: Malayalam

Shobhraj is a 1986 Indian Malayalam-language action thriller film directed by J. Sasikumar and written by Vijayan Karote, starring Mohanlal and Madhavi. The film was a Hit. The film is a remake of the 1978 Hindi film Don written by Salim–Javed. Mohanlal portrays dual roles as Shobhraj and Dharmaraj.

== Plot ==
Shobhraj is the leader of an underworld syndicate who in spite of being one of the most wanted on the list of Interpol, remains elusive to the police. Along with the police, he makes a few other enemies through his merciless approach to running his organization, especially when he kills one of his own men, Babu, when the latter decides to leave the business. This introduces Shobhraj to two new enemies, Julie, Babu's fiancée, and Nisha, Babu's sister. When Julie seduces Sobharaj and attempts to have the police arrest him, her plan backfires as Shobhraj outsmarts her and the police in his escape, and in the process, Julie is killed. A shattered, revenge-seeking Nisha gets trained in judo and karate, then enters Shobhraj's gang after deceiving them into thinking that she too is on the wrong side of the law. Shobhraj is impressed with her fighting skills and allows her to work for him, without realizing her true intentions.

Meanwhile, after a couple of unsuccessful attempts at nabbing Shobhraj but unbeknownst to her, the Deputy Superintendent of Police Mohandas is tracking down Shobhraj and in one of their confrontations, the DSP wounds Shobhraj, resulting in his death. After which the DSP remembers a person 'Dharmaraj' who looks like Shobhraj, who is really Shobhraj's blood brother, who were separated when they were small. DSP then tracks that person down. He requests Raj to impersonate Shobhraj so that the DSP can take down the rest of Shobhraj's gang, Raj requests that the DSP promises him that he will give a proper education to the children Salim and Suhra that he is looking after. The DSP then secretly holds a burying of Shobhraj. Around the time Dharmaraj "returns" to Shobhraj's gang as Shobhraj under the guise of amnesia, Raheem, just released from jail, begins his mission of revenge against DSP Mohandas and his search for his children Salim and Suhra, who had been saved and taken care of by Dharmaraj. Raheem has a past starting from his childhood playing with Shobhraj and Dharmaraj.

One day, the three went to fishing and when a fight occurred between Shobhraj and Dharmaraj, Dharmaraj falls into the river. Worried about the death of his brother, Shobhraj and Raheem flee and they later became criminals. After marriage, Raheem decided to change his life, but Shobhraj didn't like Raheem quitting and he felt angry. After some years, Shobhraj's Gang members visit him in seeking help Shobhraj run from jail in return of money. Attempt is succeeded and Shobhraj gives the money but Raheem learns from his children that his wife has eaten poison and is in the hospital. Raheem runs to the hospital with the money but DSP Mohandas arrests him for helping Shobhraj escape prison. In a struggle, Raheem's leg was shot.

Dharmaraj learns more about Shobhraj's gang and makes a plan with the DSP to prove the memory could be regained. The gang now believes that Shobhraj's memory is regained. There is a diary which Shobhraj listed the names and addresses of men belonging to the gang. Dharmaraj carefully takes the diary with anyone noticing and tells his gang that he is going to take revenge on the DSP, but is actually going there to give him the red diary. Nisha goes after him, but Dharmaraj survives the attack and he tries to explain to her that he is not Shobhraj. She refuses to believe him at first but DSP Mohandas intervenes and tells her that the man she is trying to kill is indeed Dharmaraj. He tells DSP that there is going to be a meet with all the men belonging to the gang internationally.

Incidents occur when Raheem comes to DSP's house and in a talk, knows that Salim and Suhra are taken care by the DSP and DSP promises Raheem to return. Celebrations ensue as Shobhraj announces his return to the world, but things take a drastic turn when the police raid the celebrations, acting upon Dharmaraj's information, but Dharmaraj's only witness to his true identity, Mohandas, dies in the crossfire. Tangled in a web of confusion where the police refuse to believe that he is Dharmaraj while his underworld gang realizes that he is indeed not Shobhraj, Dharmaraj incites the ire of both the police and Shobhraj's right-hand man, Shekhar. To add to Dharmaraj's woes, the diary that Dharmaraj had handed over to DSP Mohandas – his last hope of proving his innocence – is stolen by Raheem in an attempt to track down his lost children, without realizing that Dharmaraj is the one man who can reunite them. Dharmaraj escapes the clutches of the police and the underworld with Nisha's help and returns to his old self though he struggles to prove his identity and innocence.

== Cast ==
- Mohanlal in a dual role as
  - Shobhraj (antagonist)
  - Dharmaraj (protagonist)
- T. G. Ravi as Raheem, a childhood friend of Shobhraj and Dharmaraj
- Madhavi as Nisha
- Jagannatha Varma fake Interpol Officer Anand Menon, the hidden main antagonagist
- K. P. Ummer as DSP Mohandas
- Sathaar as Police Officer Sunil Nambiar
- C. I. Paul Cleetus, Righthand of Sobaraj
- Priya as Julie
- Jose
- Chithra

== Soundtrack ==
The music was composed by L. Vaidyanathan and the lyrics were written by Cheramangalam.

No.	Song	Singer(s)	Lyrics	Length
1	"Enne Tharam Thaazhthuvan"	P. Jayachandran	Cheramangalam	
2	"Kannalle Kallan"	S. Janaki	Cheramangalam	
3	"Niranjayouvvana Sarassile"	Vani Jairam	Cheramangalam	
4	"Njan Ajayyan"	K. J. Yesudas	Cheramangalam	
5	"Vilanja Munthiri"	Vani Jairam	Cheramangalam	
