= Yugandhar =

1979 film by K. S. R. Das

- Theatrical release poster
- Directed by: K. S. R. Das
- Written by: D. V. Narasa Raju(dialogues)
- Story by: Salim–Javed
- Based on: Don (Hindi)
- Produced by: P. Vidya Sagar
- Starring: N. T. Rama Rao; Jayasudha
- Cinematography: M. C. Shekar
- Edited by: P. Venkateswara Rao
- Music by: Ilaiyaraaja
- Production company: Sri Gajalakshmi Arts
- Release date: 30 November 1979
- Running time: 159 minutes
- Country: India
- Language: Telugu

Yugandhar is a 1979 Indian Telugu-language action film directed by K. S. R. Das. The film stars N. T. Rama Rao and Jayasudha, with music composed by Ilaiyaraaja. It is a remake of the Hindi film Don (1978). The film was commercially successful.

== Cast ==
- N. T. Rama Rao in a dual role as
  - Yugandhar
  - Vijay
- Jayasudha as Jaya
- Satyanarayana as Ram Singh
- Jaggayya as SP Jagannath
- Prabhakar Reddy as David/Bhanoji
- Kanta Rao as Inspector Varma
- Thyagaraju as Shankar
- Prasad Babu as Ramesh
- Jayamalini as Kamini
- Sheela as Anita
- Chalapathi Rao as Chalapathi
- Prabhakar as Gang member who fights with Vijay
- Malashri (credited as Baby Durga) as Ram Singh's daughter

== Soundtrack ==
Music was composed by Ilaiyaraaja. Although Ilaiyaraaja is known for not adapting tunes from other films, he was persuaded to use similar tunes from Don for this project. Despite using these tunes, Ilaiyaraaja added his unique touch to the soundtrack. The song "Vorrabbaa Vesukunnaa Killii" is based on "Khaike Pan Banaraswala" from Don.

The song "Naa Kosame" was used in the Telugu dubbed version of the 2023 Tamil film Leo.

Track listing
No.	Title	Lyrics	Singer(s)	Length
1.	"Naa Kosame"	C. Narayana Reddy	S. P. Balasubrahmanyam	3:26
2.	"Naa Paruvam Neekosam"	C. Narayana Reddy	S. Janaki	3:51
3.	"Vorrabbaa Vesukunnaa Killii"	C. Narayana Reddy	S. P. Balasubrahmanyam, S. Janaki	3:19
4.	"Daa Daa Daa Daa Daa"	Acharya Aatreya	S. Janaki	3:21
5.	"Peda Goppala Kusthiraa"	Veturi	S. P. Balasubrahmanyam	4:35
Total length:				18:32

== Related film ==
In 2009, a second Telugu remake of the Hindi film Don, titled Billa, was released. Jayasudha played a guest role, different from the role she played in Yugandhar.
