= Chandra Barot =

Indian film director (1939–2025)

- Born: 1939; Tanganyika Territory
- Died: 20 July 2025 (aged 86); Bandra, Mumbai, Maharashtra, India
- Occupation: Film director
- Years active: 1970–2025

Chandra Barot (1939 – 20 July 2025) was an Indian film director, working primarily in the Hindi film industry based in Mumbai, Maharashtra. Barot is best known for having directed the 1978 film Don which has attained cult status in India, and was an inspiration to various remakes and sequences, including the Shah Rukh Khan version released in 2006, which caused a degree of controversy.

Barot moved from Tanzania, the country where he was born and brought up, to India and joined actor-director Manoj Kumar as an assistant director. He assisted Manoj Kumar on several films, including Purab Aur Pachhim (1970), Yaadgaar (1970), Shor (1972), and Roti Kapda Aur Makaan (1974).

Before the filming of Don was completed, producer Nariman Irani died in an accident on the set of another film he was working on. During the shooting of Manoj Kumar's Kranti in November 1977 at Rajkamal Kalamandir Studios, Bombay, a sudden cloudburst caused a wall to collapse on Irani. He was seriously injured, hospitalized, and died a few days later. The rest of the cinematography and production of Don was completed by Barot with support from the cast and crew.

After Don, he directed the 1990 Bengali film Aashrita, which grossed ₹3 crore (equivalent to ₹35 crore or US$3.6 million in 2026).

His shelved films include Hong Kong Wali Script and Neil Ko Pakadna....Impossible.

Barot died from pulmonary fibrosis in a hospital in Banda on 20 July 2025, at the age of 86.

== Filmography ==
Year	Title	Role	Notes
1970	Purab Aur Pachhim	Assistant Director	
1970	Yaadgaar	Assistant Director	
1972	Shor	Assistant Director	
1974	Roti Kapada Aur Makaan	Assistant Director	
1978	Don	Director	
1990	Ashrita	Director	Bengali film
1991	Pyar Bhara Dil	Director	
TBA	Hong Kong Wali Script	Director	
TBA	Neil Ko Pakadna....Impossible	Director	
