= Nawab Shah (actor) =

Indian actor

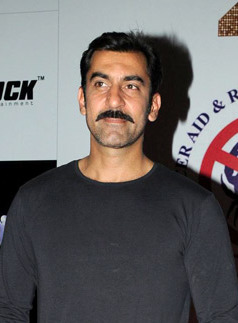
- Shah in 2012
- Occupation: Actor
- Notable work: Don 2, Dilwale, Tiger Zinda Hai
- Spouse: Pooja Batra (m. 2019)

Nawab Shah is an Indian actor, who works in Hindi, Malayalam, Tamil, Telugu and Kannada-language films and television series. Before entering into films, he played character roles in television serials.

== Career ==
Nawab Shah debuted his acting career in 1993 Doordarshan Serial, "Akbar The Great" as Babar. Later he acted in popular serials like "Shaktimaan" on DD National in 1997 and "Indian" on SAB TV in 1999.

In 2000 Shah worked with director Rajeev Kumar in Raja Ko Rani Se Pyar Ho Gaya. The film had Arvind Swamy and Manisha Koirala in the leads. Shah's performance went unnoticed.

His next film Be-Lagaam failed at the box office. Ujjal Chattopadhyay's Escape from Taliban was the first film which had given Shah a chance to "prove his talent". The story was more focused on Manisha Koirala, but Shah's performance was praised. It was a box office failure.

Parwana, Woh, and Dukaan met with the same fate. Shah's wait for recognition was prolonged. His performances in Farhan Akhtar's Lakshya and Saurabh Shukla's Chehraa fetched some praise, but he was not getting pivotal roles.

In 2011, Nawab Shah was signed to play a villain in Salman Khan's Bodyguard. He, however, had an accident and was unable to continue with the film. Later that year, he played another negative role as Jabbar, in Don 2, which starred Shah Rukh Khan in the lead. His performance was praised, and the film became a high commercial success. Shah later appeared in Bhaag Milkha Bhaag as a Pakistani athletics coach. He recently played a role in Dilwale, as Raghav, one of Dev Malik's henchmen.

== Personal life ==
Shah and actress Pooja Batra revealed their relationship in June 2019. They got married on 4 July 2019 in Delhi according to Arya Samaj traditions.

== Filmography ==
=== Film ===
Hindi

- Kartoos (1999)
- Pyaar Koi Khel Nahin (1999)
- Raja Ko Rani Se Pyar Ho Gaya (2000)
- Ittefaq (2001)
- Maa Tujhhe Salaam (2002) as Nawab Sultan
- Escape From Taliban (2003)
- Musafir (2004)
- Lakshya (2004)
- Mission Mumbai (2004)
- Aan: Men at Work (2004)
- Ab Tumhare Hawale Watan Saathiyo (2004) as Abu Hamza
- Jaan-E-Mann (2006)
- Luck (2009)
- Don 2 (2011) as Abdul Jabbar
- Bhaag Milkha Bhaag (2013)
- Humshakals (2014)
- Dilwale (2015)
- Tiger Zinda Hai (2017) as Pawan
- Panipat (2019) as Ibrahim Khan Gardi
- Dabangg 3 (2019) as Gullu
- Khuda Haafiz (2020)
- Ruslaan (2024)
- Sikandar (2025) as Virat Bakshi
- Welcome to the Jungle (2026)

Tamil

- Gajendra (2004)
- Bose (2004)
- Aran (2006)
- Yaan (2014)
- Seema Raja (2018)
- Darbar (2020)
- Sulthan (2021)

Telugu

- Devi Putrudu (2001) as St. Ohm
- Dictator (2016) as Vishwambhar
- Godfather (2022) as Abdul
- Ugram (2023) as Bhatia
- LYF: Love Your Father (2025)
- Ustaad Bhagat Singh (2026) as Ajmal Rahim

Malayalam

- Keerthi Chakra (2006) Terriost Muzafir Ahammad Ziyadi
- Inspector Garud (2007) as Guptaji
- Kaaki (2007) as Parthipan
- Roudram (2008) as Michael Korda
- Black Dalia (2009) as Robert
- Winter (2009) as Ripper
- Kandahar (2010) as Army Cadet's Instructor
- Rajadhi Raja (2014) as Gangster Sathya

Kannada

- Jyeshta (2004)
- Kotigobba 3 (2021) as Devendra
- Kabzaa (2023) as Banghira

=== Television ===
- Akbar The Great (DD TV Series) as Mugal Emperor, Babar (Father of Humayun)
- Zee Horror Show as Various
- Captain Vyom (1996) as Security to Vishwapramukh
- Shaktimaan (1997-2005) as Mayor JJ (Jai Kumar Janardhan)/Kakodar
- Indian (2000-2001) as Indian
- Ssshhhh...Koi Hai (2001-2003) as Dhrokaal
- 1857 Kranti (2002-2003) as Robert Clive (Episodes 2 to 4)
- Saarrthi (2004-2008) as Mansen Goenka
- Amma (2016) as Haider
- Naagarjuna – Ek Yoddha (2016-2017) as S. P. Baldev Singh
- Sacred Games (2018) as Salim Kaka
- Bambai Meri Jaan (2023) as Pathan
