= Don 2: The Game =

2013 action video game

- Developer: Gameshastra
- Publisher: Sony Computer Entertainment
- Platforms: PlayStation 2 PlayStation Portable
- Release: IND: February 2013
- Genres: Third-person shooter, action
- Mode: Single-player

Don 2: The Game is an action-adventure video game developed by Gameshastra and published by Sony Computer Entertainment for the PlayStation 2 and PlayStation Portable. It is based on the film of the same name. The game was released only in India in February 2013. It is the last first-party title for the PlayStation 2.

== Gameplay ==
The gameplay of Don 2 focuses primarily on shooter style missions with stealth elements. The game includes twelve missions and four boss battles including Kuala Lumpur and Berlin.
