= Kabir Akhtar =

American television director and editor

Kabir Akhtar (born January 11, 1975) is an American television director and editor, who won an Emmy Award in 2016. His credits include work for Arrested Development, Crazy Ex-Girlfriend, Never Have I Ever, Behind the Music, and the Academy Awards.

Akhtar is also the creator of The Tool Page , the oldest website about the band Tool. He ran the website (also known as "toolshed") from 1994 to 2016; it predated many popular sites, including mainstays Yahoo!, Google, and YouTube. Akhtar was an early innovator on the web, and gained some notoriety for being the source of several April Fools' Day pranks.

== Career ==
Before becoming a director, Akhtar began his career as an editor, working primarily on music and documentary series, including Behind the Music. He has edited the pilot episodes of ten series, including Speechless, Alex, Inc., and I'm With Busey. He also directed the pilot episodes of the MTV series 8th & Ocean and the 2009 relaunch edition of Unsolved Mysteries.

In 2005, while directing for Comedy Central's The Showbiz Show with David Spade, he directed a short film at the Skywalker Ranch. The short, which starred Brian Posehn alongside Star Wars characters Darth Vader and Chewbacca, was reviewed favorably by StarWars.com as being "like nothing you've ever seen."

In 2006, Akhtar edited the opening film and several short films for the 78th Annual Academy Awards, which were well-reviewed. NBC soon listed him as one of the entertainment industry's "People to Watch", for his work as an emerging director. In 2008, Radar Magazine praised Akhtar's work on the first season of Tracey Ullman's Showtime series State of the Union as "slick editing, [with] skillful use of stock footage."

Akhtar began directing episodic television in 2008, directing three episodes of the British comedy series Mumbai Calling. The series, which was shot entirely in India, aired in 2009 on ITV1 in England and HBO internationally. He later directed part of the opening film for the 63rd Primetime Emmy Awards starring Jane Lynch and Leonard Nimoy, and directed a segment of the 84th Academy Awards, starring host Billy Crystal and Melissa McCarthy in a well-received segment. He also edited the opening films for both broadcasts, and was nominated for an Emmy for editing the Oscars opening.

Following the nomination, Akhtar became the lead editor on the fourth season of Arrested Development, and spoke at Prime Cuts, an annual Television Academy event in Hollywood featuring Emmy-nominated editors. That season he earned a second Emmy nomination and began work on New Girl. He later became a producer/editor on the musical comedy series Crazy Ex-Girlfriend, which garnered him a third Emmy nomination and an Emmy win for cutting the pilot episode. He went on to direct several episodes of the series as a director-producer.

After Crazy Ex-Girlfriend, he continued directing full-time, including Resident Alien, Young Sheldon, Superstore, High School Musical: The Musical: The Series, Saved By The Bell, and Never Have I Ever. He was also a producer and director on the HBO Max series The Sex Lives of College Girls.

Akhtar has also been a featured speaker at industry events held by the Directors Guild of America, the Academy of Television Arts & Sciences, SAG-AFTRA, and Avid. At a comedy workshop presented by the Sundance Film Festival, he advised attendees that although filmmakers “can find the comedy on set", they "can break it in editing. Comedy is fragile." In 2018, he was a panelist at SXSW.

== Awards and nominations ==
Year	Award	Category	Work	Result
2012	Primetime Emmy Award	Outstanding Picture Editing For Short-Form Segments And Variety Specials	84th Academy Awards; Opening Film	Nominated
2013	Primetime Emmy Award	Outstanding Single-Camera Picture Editing for a Comedy Series	Arrested Development "Flight of the Phoenix"	Nominated
2014	A.C.E Eddie Award	Best Edited Half-Hour Series for Television	Arrested Development "Flight of the Phoenix"	Nominated
2016	Primetime Emmy Award	Outstanding Single-Camera Picture Editing for a Comedy Series	Crazy Ex-Girlfriend "Josh Just Happens To Live Here!" (Pilot)	Won
2018	A.C.E Eddie Award	Best Edited Comedy Series for Commercial Television	Crazy Ex-Girlfriend "Josh's Ex-Girlfriend Wants Revenge"	Nominated
2021	NAACP Image Award	Outstanding Directing in a Comedy Series	Never Have I Ever "...started a nuclear war"	Nominated
2021	Directors Guild of America Award	Outstanding Directorial Achievement in Children's Programs	High School Musical: The Musical: The Series "Opening Night"	Nominated
2023	Children's & Family Emmy Award	Outstanding Directing for a Single Camera Program	The Mysterious Benedict Society	Nominated

== Association with Tool ==
In 1994, Akhtar started work on an unofficial website about the band Tool. Part of this effort was the writing of the Tool FAQ, a document which has often been cited as a source of information about the band. However, because there was little information available about the band in the days before widespread Internet usage, there were many incomplete sections in the original edition of the FAQ. In early 1995, Akhtar began corresponding online with the band's singer, Maynard James Keenan. Keenan sent him the then-unpublished lyrics to the band's entire catalog, and filled in the gaps in the FAQ. Shortly thereafter, Akhtar's website was christened "The Tool Page," and began tracking Tool news updates.

Akhtar and Keenan's relationship has continued since then, with the two collaborating on releasing information about the secretive band, and even on selling Keenan's car. When Akhtar created a section of the site for fans to discuss their interpretations of Tool's dense lyrics, Keenan became an occasional reader. Their association led to the band acknowledging Akhtar's work on their official site, and begat the site's description as "semi-official."

Akhtar was also an early adopter of online video technology, offering streaming music videos on the site as early as 1996, nine years before the advent of YouTube.

That same year, MTV renamed Tool's music video "Stinkfist" due to offensive connotations, and the lyrics of the song were altered. Akhtar encouraged fans to contact MTV and complain about the censorship. In response to the overwhelming number of emails sent, Matt Pinfield of MTV's 120 Minutes expressed regret on air by waving his fist in front of his face while introducing the video and explaining the name change.

Akhtar has been a repeat guest on the Australian nationwide radio network Triple J, appearing on segments of The J-Files, hosted by Richard Kingsmill. Each appearance centered on discussion of Tool and the success of the website.

In addition to being reviewed or cited numerous times in the media (in the New York Post, MTV, The Village Voice, Alternative Press), Akhtar has been the recipient of numerous awards, including Rolling Stone's "Hitsworld" #1 Artist Site, Shoutweb's Best Unofficial Artist Site, and was the only recipient of Tool's own Best Unofficial Site Award. Although some of these sites are now defunct, these awards demonstrate a significant presence in the early days of the online music scene.

On May 2, 2016, Akhtar announced that the site would no longer be updated but would remain available indefinitely as a resource for fans. The site was actively maintained for nearly twenty years.

=== April Fools' Day pranks ===
Akhtar posted an April Fools' Day prank to The Tool Page every year from 1997 to 2009, and again in 2011. Although he gained a reputation for writing a fake post annually, some of his posts were picked up by the media and believed as true.

==== 1997: Bus accident ====
April 1, 1997, saw the first of several April Fools' Day pranks related to the band, created by Akhtar. That day, he wrote that "at least three of the band are listed in critical condition" after a tour bus accident on a highway.

His hoax gained wide attention, and was reported throughout the day on radio stations nationwide; many stations reported it as if it were true. Tool's record label was flooded with calls from people who believed the prank was real. The following day, MTV began running hourly on-air updates debunking the claim. Akhtar later posted an apology, claiming that The Tool Page "will not indulge itself in such outlandish pranks in the future"—a claim that would be belied by later April Fools' pranks.

Additionally, on the subsequent weekend's MTV series Week In Rock, Kurt Loder went so far as to refer to Akhtar as "some clown". (Loder also incorrectly described Tool as an "industrial" band.) Akhtar responded in an interview in Alternative Press, saying "I didn't think it was responsible of [Loder] to call me a clown." However, when the band (who are known to enjoy misleading the press) learned of the prank, they sent Akhtar a platinum copy of their then-latest album, Ænima.

==== 2005: Maynard finds Jesus ====
Akhtar posted an annual prank every April Fools' Day after that, some of which were noted by various media outlets. None of the subsequent posts, though, were reported to the extent that the above-mentioned "bus crash" was, until 2005.

On April 1, 2005, Keenan emailed Akhtar to ask for his collaboration with a prank to be announced on Tool's official website. Tool announced that "Maynard has found Jesus" and that he would be abandoning the recording of the next Tool album possibly permanently. Hours later, Akhtar posted a letter to his site from Keenan, stating that the announcement was true. MTV News picked up the story, reporting that because both Tool's and Akhtar's websites had the same news, they were unsure whether it was real or not. Kurt Loder of MTV contacted Keenan to ask for a confirmation and received a nonchalant confirmation. Brian Welch (formerly of the band Korn), who made the same news some months earlier, was delighted. However, on April 6 Akhtar explained that it had just been a prank; Tool's site followed suit on April 7.

==== 2007: Danny's broken arm ====
On April 1, 2007, Akhtar posted a note to The Tool Page, advising that the band's upcoming spring tour would be cancelled due to drummer Danny Carey's injured arm. Though the post was a hoax, Carey's arm had been injured earlier that year, a fact that led some news outlets (including Spin Magazine) to run the story as if it were true.

== Personal life ==
He is the son of noted psychiatrist Salman Akhtar, is the nephew of award-winning Bollywood lyricist Javed Akhtar and of actress Shabana Azmi, and is the first cousin of film directors Farhan Akhtar and Zoya Akhtar. He is also the grandson of Urdu poet Jan Nisar Akhtar, and the great-great-great-grandson of Indian poet and freedom fighter Maulana Fazl-e-Haq Khairabadi.

Akhtar is a cyclist, and was interviewed on Marketplace discussing the Los Angeles Ciclavia event. He is also a fan of the Philadelphia Eagles, and has been a guest on Bleeding Green Radio and has been quoted on NFL.com.

By the time he was nine years old, the state of Pennsylvania had recognized him as having "outstanding intellectual and creative ability." Akhtar went on to take an interest in theater, working on several productions while attending both Lower Merion High School and the University of Pennsylvania.

While a student at Penn, he was one of the architects of a prank which involved spelling out a highly visible message in Christmas lights across the front of the 20th floor of a campus building. He also was elected to the board of governors of the Intuitons Experimental Theater company.
