= Majaz Lakhnawi =

Indian Urdu poet (1911–1955)

Majaz Rudaulvi
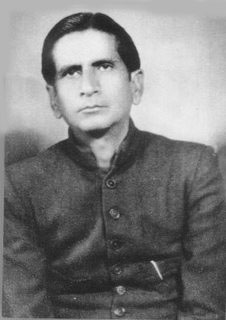
- Born: 19 October 1911; Rudauli, United Provinces of Agra and Oudh, British India
- Died: 5 December 1955 (aged 44); Lucknow, Uttar Pradesh, India
- Occupation: Poet
- Relatives: Hamida Salim (sister); Ansar Harvani (brother); Javed Akhtar (nephew); Salman Akhtar (nephew); Farhan Akhtar (grandnephew)
- Writing career
- Pen name: Majaz
- Genres: Urdu poetry, Ghazal, nazm, geet
- Subjects: Lust, philosophy, revolution
- Literary movement: Progressive Writers' Movement

Asrar-ul-Haq (19 October 1911 – 5 December 1955), better known as Majaz Lakhnawi, was an Indian Urdu poet. He is known for his romantic and revolutionary poetry. He composed ghazals and nazms in Urdu. He was the maternal uncle of poet and screenplay writer Javed Akhtar and Indian-American psychoanalyst Salman Akhtar.

== Early life and education ==
Majaz was born on 19 October 1911 at Rudauli in Ayodhya district of what is now Uttar Pradesh. His family were a branch of a land-owning gentry family, but were not wealthy. His brother Ansar Harvani was a journalist and he had two older sisters, namely Safia and Hamida. (Note: Hamida wrote an account of her family titled Hum Paanch Thay (We Were Five).) Safia was the wife of poet Jan Nisar Akhtar. Thus, Majaz was the maternal uncle of Javed Akhtar.

Majaz suffered from a hearing impairment even as a child, and probably for this reason, he tended to be somewhat difficult, with erratic behavior; he was moody and also a loner. He had the habit of staying awake all night and doing most of his work then; as a result, his earned the nickname "Jaggan Bhaiyya" ("stays-awake brother" in Hindi). According to a major newspaper of the region, "With hindsight one could deduce that he had the marks of a bipolar mental disorder that became more pronounced as he grew older and his life began to fall apart".

Majaz's father, Seraj-ul-Haq, was a university graduate at a time when this was rare; he joined government service, serving in the middle ranks of the registration department, and finally reached the rank of Assistant Registrar. He was posted mainly in Lucknow, but since his aged parents needed attention, he kept his wife and children in the ancestral house at Rudauli, which is not far from Lucknow, and he would visit them about twice a month. Thus, Majaz grew up mainly in Rudauli and received his basic education there. In the late 1920s, his father was transferred to Agra. Since his parents were no more, and since Agra was too far from Rudauli for frequent visits, Seraj-ul-Haq decided to take his wife and children with him.

Majaz completed school in Agra in 1929, and enrolled in St. John's Intermediate College. Almost immediately, his father was transferred to Aligarh, and the family moved again, leaving Majaz in a hostel. The young Majaz was given a cash allowance for the first time in his life, and freedom from his mother's adoring but eagle surveillance. He behaved like many teenagers of his age, neglected his studies, spent his time and money the way he liked, and failed his exams. Yet, his time was spent not on games or in disreputable activities, but in attending mushairas (poetry symposia) and music concerts. It was at this time that he came in contact with both senior and upcoming poets of Agra, including Fani Badayuni, Ale Ahmad Suroor and Jazbi. With difficulty, Majaz finally cleared his intermediate exams in 1931, and rejoined his parents in Aligarh, where his father got him enrolled for BA at Aligarh Muslim University, his subjects being philosophy, economics and Urdu. He graduated in 1936, again taking a year more than he should have.

== Career ==
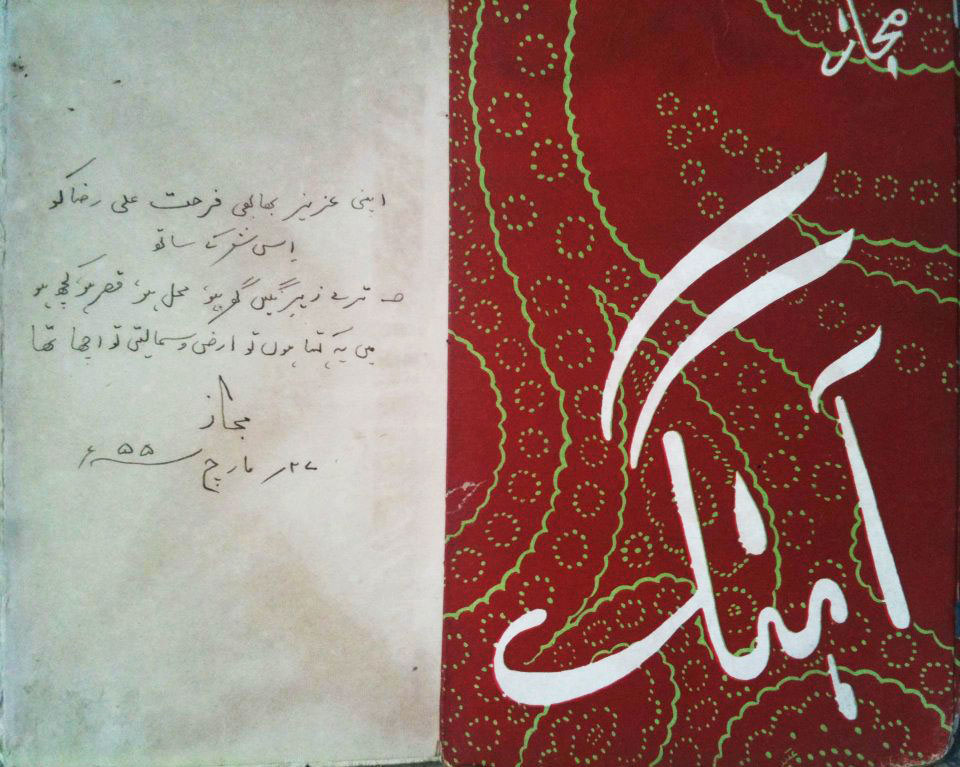
Aahang, a self autographed copy by Majaz.

The years that Majaz spent in Aligarh Muslim University (AMU) coincided with the presence there of many important poets and writers of Urdu. AMU was indeed a nursery of literary talent during those years. Here he came in contact with the Progressive Writers' Movement under K. M. Ashraf and Abdul Aleem. Majaz lived and wrote in times which were exceptionally vibrant for poetry; Urdu-language poets such as Faiz Ahmed Faiz, Fani Badayuni, Jazbi, Makhdoom, Sahir Ludhianvi, Ismat Chughtai, and Ali Sardar Jafri were among his peers. They were not merely his contemporaries but close friends as well. Others such as Josh and Firaq knew him well. His first diwan, Ahang, is dedicated to Faiz and Jazbi whom he calls his "dil-o-jigar," and to Sardar Jafri and Makhdoom, who are "mere dast-o-bazu." Faiz wrote a thoughtful prelude to Ahang.

Majaz abandoned his MA in Aligarh due to financial reasons and moved to Delhi where he worked as sub-editor for the journal, Awaaz (Call). Here he became actively involved with the Delhi branch of the Progressive Writers' Association run by Shahid Ahmad Dehlvi. He also worked for the All India Radio for a year before moving to Bombay, where he worked in the Department of Information for the Government of Bombay.

In 1937, he returned to Lucknow and along with Jafri and Sibte Hassan founded the literary magazine, Parcham (Flag) which ran only for a single issue. In Lucknow, he also worked on the editorial staff of journals like Halqa-e-Adab (Circle of Literature) and in Naya Adab (New Literature) along with Jafri and Sibte Hassan.

=== Commemorative postage stamp ===
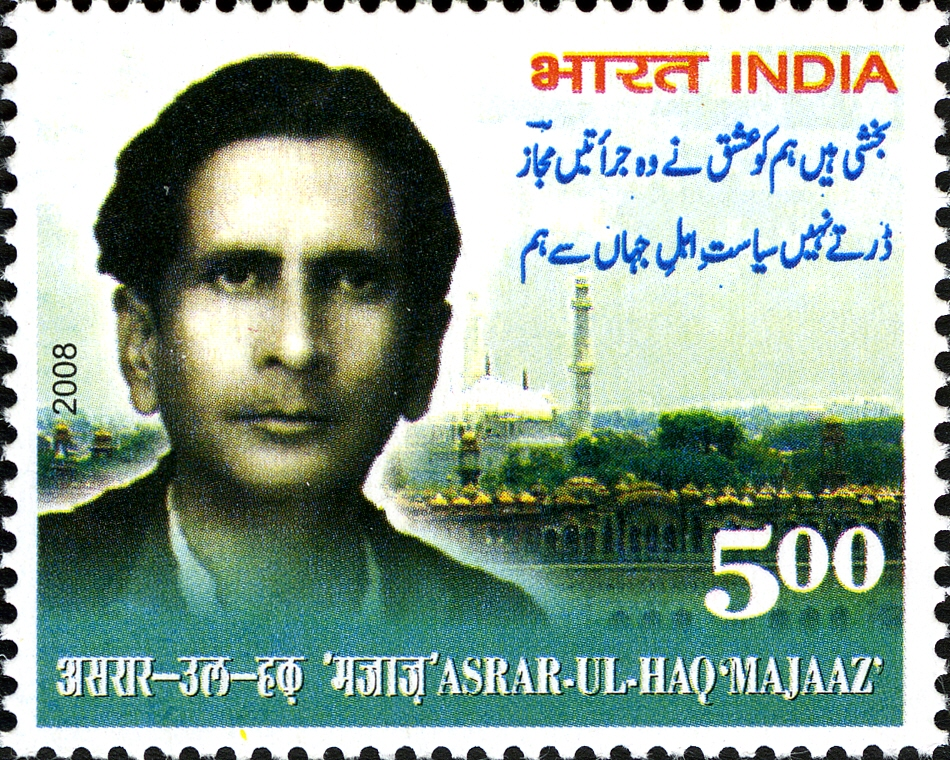
Majaz on 2008 postage stamp of India

In 2008, Government of India issued a commemorative postage stamp honoring his contributions to Indian literature.

One of his poetic verses shown on this postage stamp is:

Bakhshi Hain Hum Ko Ishq Ne Woh Jurra'tain Majaz
Darte Nahin Siasat-e-Ahle-Jahan Say Hum

Translation:

Majaz, love has blessed us with such courage
I am not even afraid of any politics by this world

From another poem Aawaara:

Shehar Ki Raat Aur Mein Naashad O Naakara Phirun
Jagmagaati Jaagti Sadkaun Pe Aawara Phirun
Ghair Ki Basti Hai Kab Tak Dar-Badar Maara Phirun
Ae Gham-e-Dil Kya Karun, Ae Wahshat-e-Dil Kya Karun

== Death ==
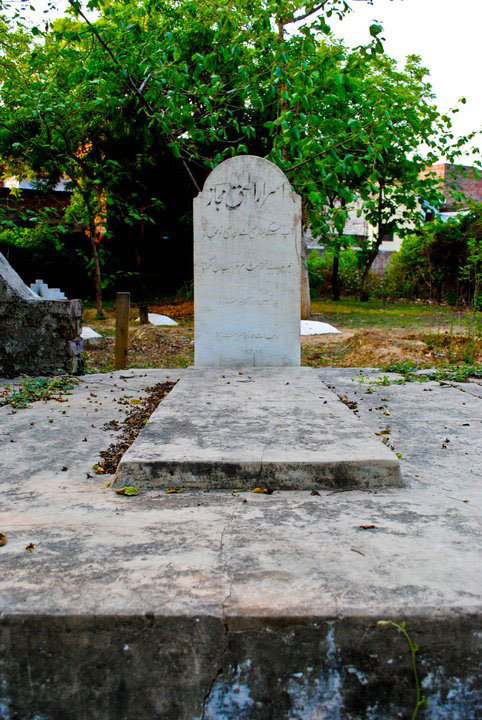
Majaz's grave at Nishatganj Graveyard in Lucknow.

Majaz died on 5 December 1955, while the first Students' Urdu Convention was underway in Lucknow. His condolence meeting was held on 7 December 1955 in the Rifah-e-Aam Hall and was attended by poets and writers from all over India.

Due to his heavy drinking over a failed love life, he had a tragic death. On the night of his death, according to a newspaper, "Majaz's friends took him to a tavern in Lalbagh where they all drank on the rooftop. One by one they all left leaving Majaz alone in the cold winter night. The next morning he was rushed to the hospital where doctors diagnosed a brain hemorrhage and pneumonia". Majaz died that night.

He was buried in a cemetery in Lucknow. His grave bears a verse from one of his ghazals written in 1945:

And after this there is morn and the new morning Majaz
With me ends the eve of sorrows of Lucknow.

== Major works ==
Majaz's collection of poems include:

- Ahang (Melody) - 1938
- Shab-e-tar (Dark Night) - 1945
- Saaz-e-Nau (New Musical Instruments) - 1949
- Tarana (anthem) Yeh Mera Chaman, Yeh Mera Chaman of Aligarh Muslim University
- Noora Nurse Poem
- Aawara Poem

== Legacy ==
- In memory of the poet a book launch of, Majaz Aur Uski Shaayeri, edited by Salman Akhtar was held in collaboration with The Nehru Centre, London and Aligarh Muslim University Alumni Association (UK). The programme included video clippings on Majaz including comments by Hamida Salim (Majaz's sister) and Ali Sardar Jafri (Majaaz's friend and contemporary poet), a speech by Parvaiz Alam (broadcaster and dramatist), a lecture Majaz – Teen Daayeron ka Shayer by Akhtar, and Kalam-e-Majaz sung by Nasser Harvani and Majaz's nephew from New Delhi.
- Kahkashan lit. Galaxy, A calassic doordarshan biographical telefilm based on the life stories of a Galaxy of Poets covers Majaz's major life events and poetry, narrated by Ali Sardar Jafri. This play portrays the stages of 'Zuhoor', 'Urooj' and then 'Zawaal' of Majaz, furthered by the general deterioration.
- A dastangoi based on Majaz's life and poetry was performed by Ankit Chadha and Himanshu Bajpai This narrative introduces the audience to Majaz, his childhood, his fame at AMU, his days in Delhi, his love, his poetry and most importantly his vagabondism. The story was told through accounts of the poet's relatives, friends and acquaintances.
- Majaz: Ae Gham-e-Dil Kya Karun, is a 2017 Indian biographical film directed by Ravindra Singh about Majaz.
- A poem Yeh Mera Chaman, Yeh Mera Chaman by Majaz is now the anthem for Aligarh Muslim University.

== Cited sources ==
- Coppola, Carlo (1981). "Asrarul Haq Majaz: The Progressive Poet as Revolutionary Romantic". Indian Literature. 24 (4): 46–62. ISSN 0019-5804. JSTOR 23330208.
- Jalil, Rakhshanda (2014). Liking Progress, Loving Change: A Literary History of the Progressive Writers' Movement in Urdu. Oxford University Press. ISBN 978-0-19-809673-3.
