= Ansar Harvani =

Indian politician

Member of Parliament, Lok Sabha
- In office 1962–1967
- Preceded by: Chaudhri Badan Singh
- Constituency: Bisauli (Lok Sabha constituency), Uttar Pradesh
- In office 1957–1962
- Succeeded by: Gauri Shankar
- Constituency: Fatehpur, Uttar Pradesh

Personal details
- Born: 16 February 1916 Rudauli, United Provinces of Agra and Oudh, British India (present-day Uttar Pradesh, India)
- Died: 28 October 1996 (aged 80) New Delhi, India
- Party: Indian National Congress
- Spouse: Sahaibzadi Gauhar Ara
- Children: 1 son and 3 daughters
- Relatives: Hamida Salim (sister); Majaz (brother); Javed Akhtar (nephew); Salman Akhtar (nephew); Farhan Akhtar (grand son)

Ansar Harvani was an Indian politician. Harwani opposed the partition of India. He was elected to the Lok Sabha, lower house of the Parliament of India from Fatehpur, Uttar Pradesh as a member of the Indian National Congress. He often consulted senior leader of the Party Nirmal Chandra Chaturvedi, MLC for the issues to be raised in the Lok Sabha and worked on them seriously.

== Personal life ==
Ansar was born in 1916 in Rudauli, in Uttar Pradesh. His brother, Asrar-ul-Haq "Majaz" was also a prominent Urdu poet, and sister Hamida Salim, was a notable poet and writer. His other sister, Safia Akhtar was also a writer and critic, and his nephew is lyricist and poet Javed Akhtar.
