= Muztar Khairabadi =

Urdu poet (1865-1927)

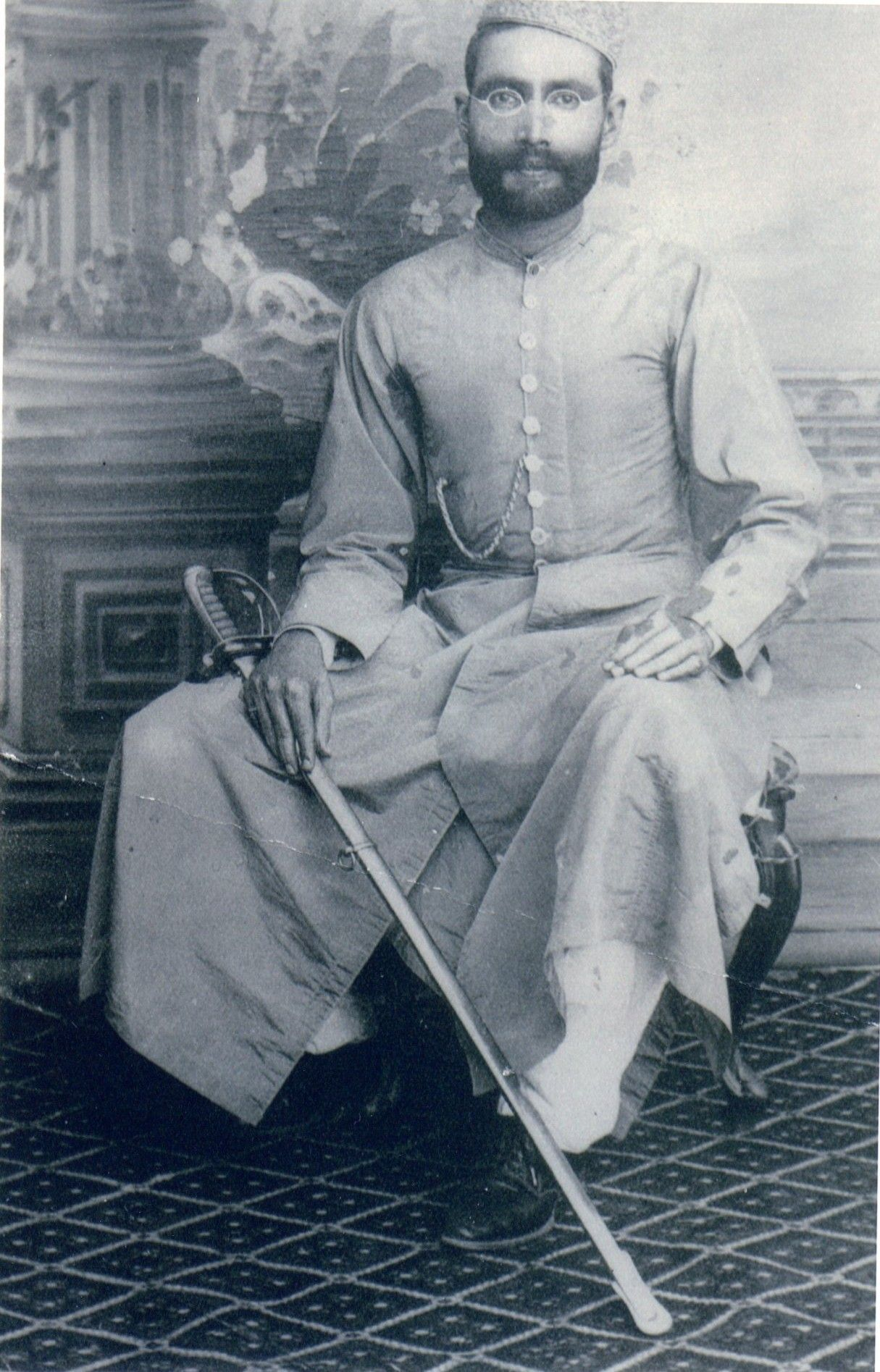
- Born: Syyed Mohammad Iftikhar Hussain Rizvi; 1865; Khairabad, North-Western Provinces, British India
- Died: 27 March 1927 (aged 64–65); Gwalior, Gwalior State, British India
- Occupation: Poet
- Children: Jan Nisar Akhtar
- Relatives: Fazl-e-Haq Khairabadi (grandfather); Javed Akhtar (grandson); Salman Akhtar (grandson); Zoya Akhtar (great-granddaughter); Farhan Akhtar (great-grandson); Uneza Akhtar (great-granddaughter); Albina Akhtar (great-granddaughter); Shahid Akhtar (great-grandson)
- Writing career
- Language: Urdu

Iftikhar Hussain Akhtar (1865 – 27 March 1927), known by his pen name Muztar Khairabadi, was an Indian Urdu poet.

== Biography ==
Khairabadi was born in 1865 in Khairabad. He was the grandson of Fazl-e-Haq Khairabadi, who was also a poet, philosopher, religious scholar, Arabist, Persian and Urdu writer and freedom fighter. Khairabadi's first mentor was his mother. He shifted and spent most of his life in Gwalior.

He received the titles Eitbar-ul-Mulk, and Iftikhar-ul-Shaura. He died in 1927 in Gwalior, and is buried there.

He was the father of poet and lyricist Jan Nisar Akhtar and grandfather of Javed Akhtar and Salman Akhtar. His great grandchildren include Farhan Akhtar, Zoya Akhtar, and Kabir Akhtar. According to music expert Rajesh Subramanian the famous iconic poem and song sung by Mohammed Rafi in Lal Quila 1960 Na kisi ki ankh ka noor hoon by penned by Muztar and not by Bahadur Shah Zafar as commonly perceived and credited. Khairabadi wrote poetry books. He also published a literary magazine entitled Karishama-e-Dilbar.

Khairabadi died on 27 March 1927 in Gwalior.

=== Bibliography ===
His works include:

- Nazr-e-Khuda (in Praise of God), a poetry collection
- Meelaad-e-Mustafa, the collection of na`at
- Behr-e-Taweel, a poem
- Marg-e-Ghalat ki Fariyad, a ghazal

== See also ==
- List of Urdu language poets
