= Padma Sachdev =

Indian poet (1940–2021)

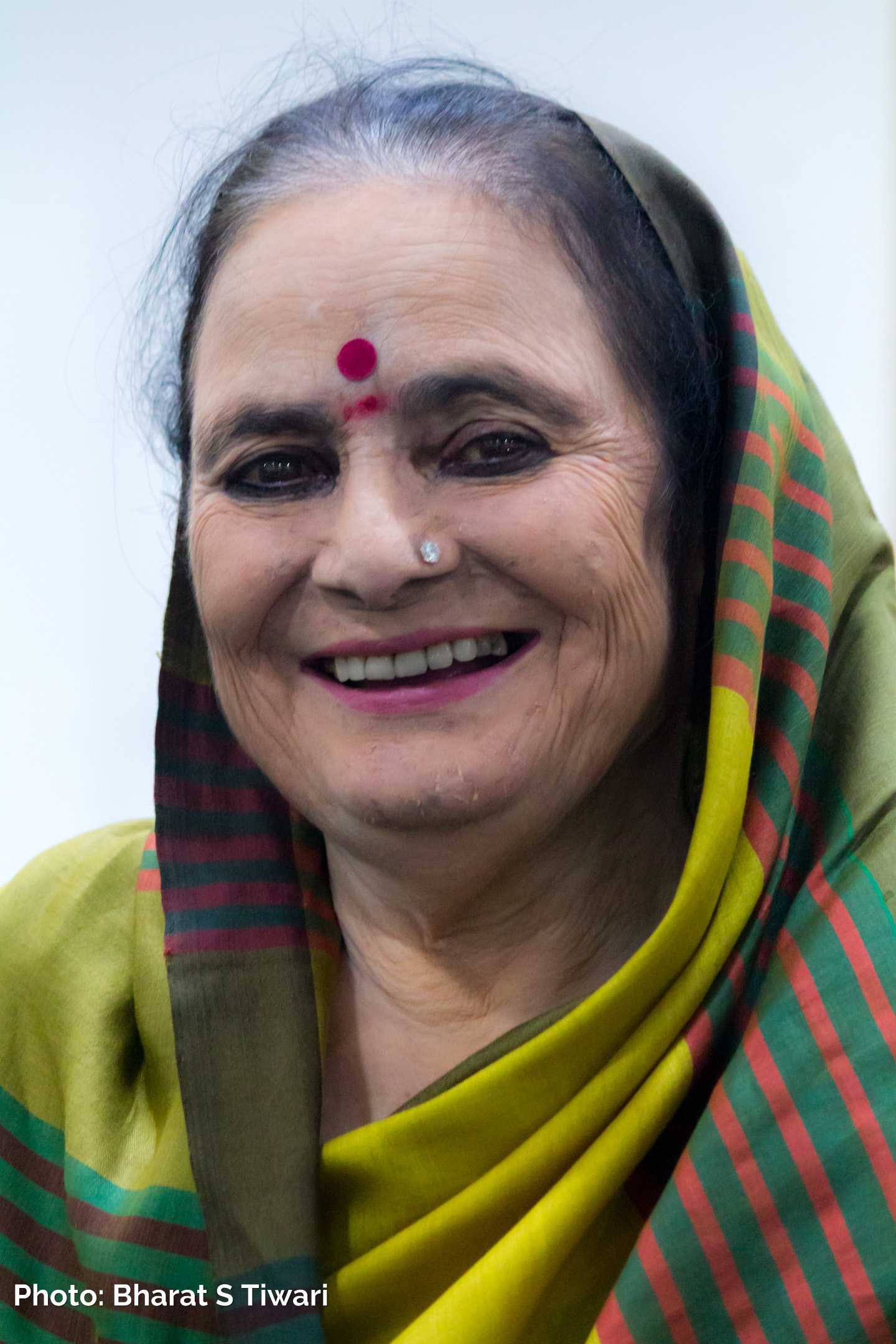
- Sachdev in 2018
- Born: April 17, 1940; Purmandal Jammu, Jammu and Kashmir, British Raj
- Died: August 4, 2021 (aged 81); Mumbai, Maharashtra, India
- Citizenship: Indian
- Occupations: Poet, writer
- Spouse(s): Vedpal Deep and later Surinder Singh (1966–2021)
- Writing career
- Language: Dogri
- Notable awards: Sahitya Akademi; Padma Shri; Kabir Samman

Padma Sachdev (17 April 1940 – 4 August 2021) was an Indian poet and novelist. She was the first modern woman poet of the Dogri language. She also wrote in Hindi. She published several poetry collections, including Meri Kavita Mere Geet (My Poems, My Songs), which won the Sahitya Akademi Award in 1971. She also received the Padma Shri, India's fourth highest civilian award in 2001, and the Kabir Samman for poetry for the year 2007-08 given by Government of Madhya Pradesh, Saraswati Samman for the year 2015, Sahitya Akademi Fellowship in 2019.

== Personal life and death ==
Sachdev was born in Purmandal, Jammu on 17 April 1940. She was the eldest of three children of a Sanskrit scholar, professor Jai Dev Badu, who was later killed during the partition of India in 1947. She first married Vedpal Deep and later married singer Surinder Singh of the musical duo "Singh Bandhu" in 1966. She and Surinder Singh first lived in New Delhi, but later shifted to Mumbai. She died on 4 August 2021 in Mumbai at the age of 81, leaving behind husband Surinder Singh and their daughter Meeta Sachdev.

== Career ==
Sachdev worked in All India Radio, Jammu as an announcer since 1961. Here she met Surinder Singh, Hindustani vocalist of the Singh Bandhu musical duo, who was a duty officer at the time. In the following years, she also worked with All India Radio, Mumbai.

Sachdev won the Sahitya Akademi Award for her anthology Meri Kavita Mere Geet (transl. my poem my song) in 1969. Writing in the preface of the work, Hindi poet Ramdhari Singh Dinkar noted "After reading Padma's poems I felt I should throw my pen away – for what Padma writes is true poetry." Her autobiography Boond Bawadi is considered a classic. Her book In Bin (transl. without them) addressed the under appreciated role played by domestic helps in Indian households.

She wrote the lyrics of the song 'Mera chhota sa ghar baar' from the 1973 Hindi film by Ved Rahi "Prem Parbat" which had music by Jaidev. Thereafter, she wrote the lyrics of two songs of the 1978 Hindi film "Aankhin Dekhi", which had music by J.P. Kaushik including the famous duet "Sona re, tujhe kaise miloo" sung by Mohd Rafi and Sulakshana Pandit. She also wrote the lyrics along with Yogesh for the 1979 Hindi film "Saahas", which had music by Ameen Sangeet.

She is also credited with influencing famous Indian singer, Lata Mangeshkar into singing dogri language songs (notably Tu malla tu, Bhala Sapaiyaa Dogreiya), which became quite a rage.

== Works ==
- Meri Kavita Mere Geet (1969)
- Tavi Te Chanhan (Rivers Tawi and Chenab, 1976)
- Nheriyan Galiyan (Dark Lanes, 1982)
- Pota Pota Nimbal (Fingertipful Cloudless Sky, 1987)
- Uttar Vahini (1992)
- Tainthian (1997).
- Amrai (Hindi Interviews)
- Diwankhana (Interviews)
- Chith Chete (Memoirs)

== Awards ==
- Dinu Bhai Pant Life Time Achievement Award, 2017 by D.B. Pant Memorial Trust, Jammu, J&K
- Krutitava Smagra Samman, 2015 by Bharatiya Bhasha Parishad, West Bengal
- Saraswati Samman, 2015 for her autobiography "Chitt-Chete" in Dogri language
- Padma Shri Award. 2001
- Sahitya Akademi Award 1971
- Kabir Samman for poetry. 2007-08

== Bibliography ==
- Naushin. Kitabghar, 1995.
- Main Kahti Hun Ankhin Dekhi (Travelogue). Bharatiya Gyanpith, 1995.
- *Bhatko nahin Dhananjay. Bharatiya Gyanpith, 1999. ISBN 8126301309.
- Amrai. Rajkamal Prakashan, 2000. ISBN 8171787649.
- Jammu Jo Kabhi Sahara Tha (Novel). Bharatiya Jnanpith, 2003. ISBN 8126308869.
- Phira kyā huā?, with Jnaneśvara, and Partha Senagupta. National Book Trust, 2007. ISBN 8123750420.

Translations

- Where Has My Gulla Gone (Anthology). Prabhat Prakashan, 2009. ISBN 8188322415.
- A Drop in the Ocean: An Autobiography. tr. by Uma Vasudev, Jyotsna Singh. National Book Trust, India, 2011. ISBN 8123761775.

== See also ==
- List of Indian writers
- List of Indian poets
