= Khairabad, Sitapur =

Khairabad
- Town
- Location in Uttar Pradesh, India Khairabad (India)
- Coordinates: 27.53°N 80.75°E
- Country: India
- State: Uttar Pradesh
- Division: Lucknow
- District: Sitapur

Government
  - Type: Municipal Council
  - Body: Khairabad Municipal Council
  - Municipal Chairperson: Baby Gupta (BJP)
  - Lok Sabha MP: Rakesh Rathore (INC)

Area
  - Total: 9 km^{2} (3.5 sq mi)
- Elevation: 138 m (453 ft)

Population (2011)
  - Total: 48,490
  - Density: 5,400/km^{2} (14,000/sq mi)

Languages
  - Official: Hindi
- Time zone: UTC+5:30 (IST)
- Vehicle registration: UP-34
- Website: khairabadnpp.in

Khairabad is a town in the Sitapur district of Uttar Pradesh state of India. It is 8 km from Sitapur on National Highway 24 in the Awadh region of India, about 80 km from the state capital Lucknow. A Municipal board conducts the affairs of the town.

== History ==
Khairabad is a historic town known as Khairabad Awadh. It was a famous seat of learning during the Mughal period. The Indian freedom fighter Maulana Fazl-e-Haq Khairabadi belonged to this town he was a kayasth before converting to Islam. The town has been the abode of many Urdu poets and writers. It has a famous madrasa for female education known as Jamia Fatima Zehra.

The town is said to have been founded by Maharaja Khaira Pasi in the early 11th century. It was subsequently taken in possession by a Kayasth family. In later years, many rent-free grants of land were made to Muslims who came in large numbers during the reigns of Babur and Akbar, but these grants were all resumed by the Nawab of Oudh in the early 1800s. Before the above-mentioned Khaira Pasi's time, the place was known as Masichait (Masi Chitra) and was a place of pilgrimage as far back as the reign of the Bikramajit. The name still exists at the appellation of a tank, the waters of which are said to possess healing properties, and which is called "Maswasi Talao".

It was a big trading centre, where Kashmiri shawls, jewels of Birmingham and elephants of Assam were traded. The East India Company arranged to export the handloom clothes manufactured in Khairabad and Dariyabagh.

During the 1857 Uprising, Maulana Fazl-e-Haq took an active part to get rid of the British from the country. Unfortunately, he was arrested and sentenced for life to the prison at Kalapani (Cellular Jail) on Andaman Island.

== Present history ==
Presently the district is not very important from an industrial point of view, however there are five sugar mills and some flour mills and rice mills in the district. The district is mainly known for its cotton and woolen mats (durries). Laharpur and Khairabad are famous for its production and export.

== Notable people ==
- Fazl-e-Haq Khairabadi (1796–1861), Indian scholar and freedom fighter
- Muztar Khairabadi (1865 – 1927), Indian Urdu poet, grandson of Fazl-e-Haq Khairabadi
- Jan Nisar Akhtar (1914–1976), Indian Urdu poet and film lyricist, son of Muztar Khairabadi and father of Javed Akhtar.

== Educational institutions ==
In the outskirts of Khairabad town is located residential school Jawahar Navodaya Vidyalaya run by Navodaya Vidyalaya Samiti, Ministry of Human Resource Development of the Government of India. It was established in 1988. The school campus covers around 29.8 acres of land. The Vidyalaya is surrounded by the grove of Sagon, Sheesham, Mango and other green trees.

== Gallery ==
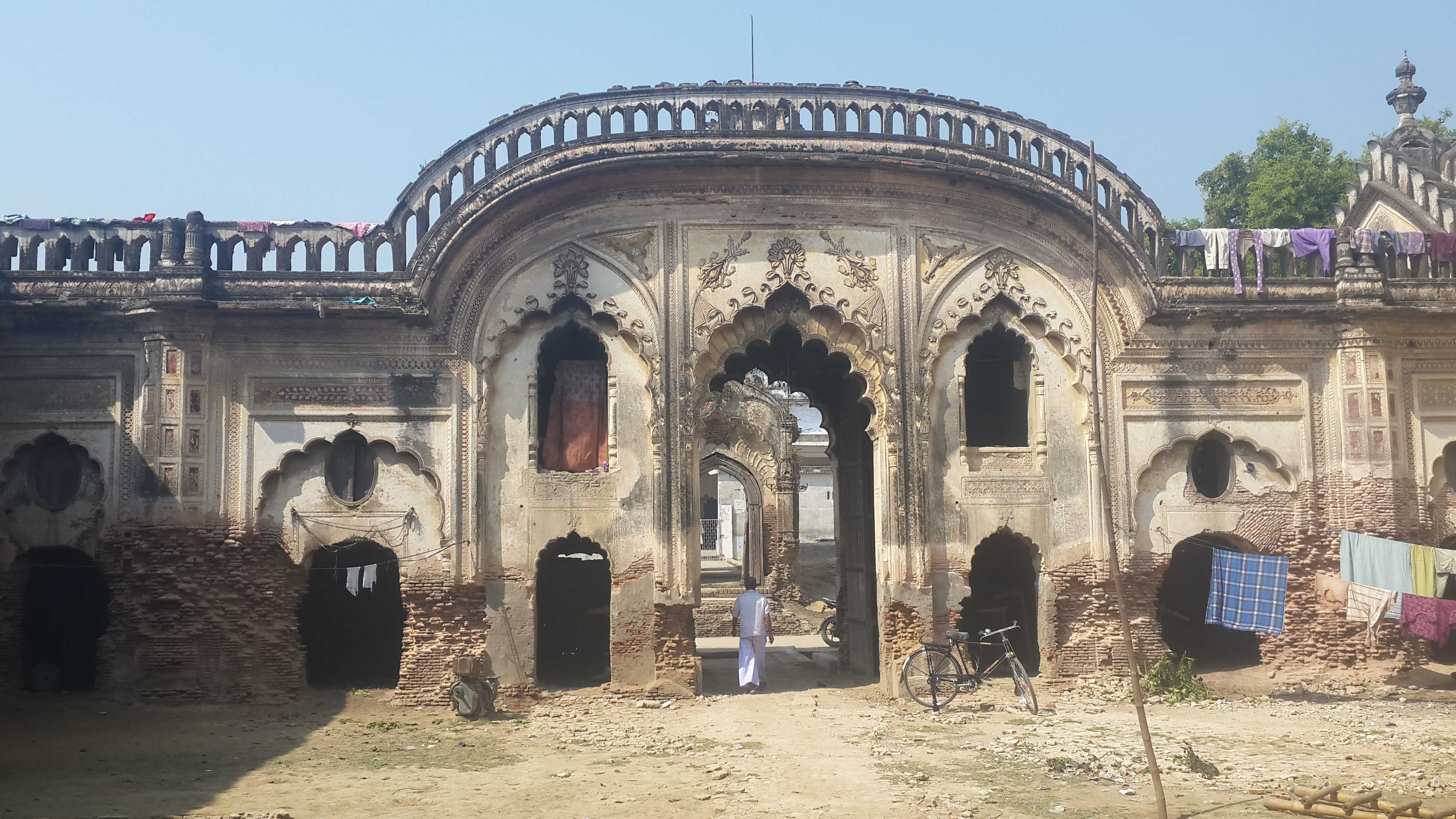
Imambara Khairabad.

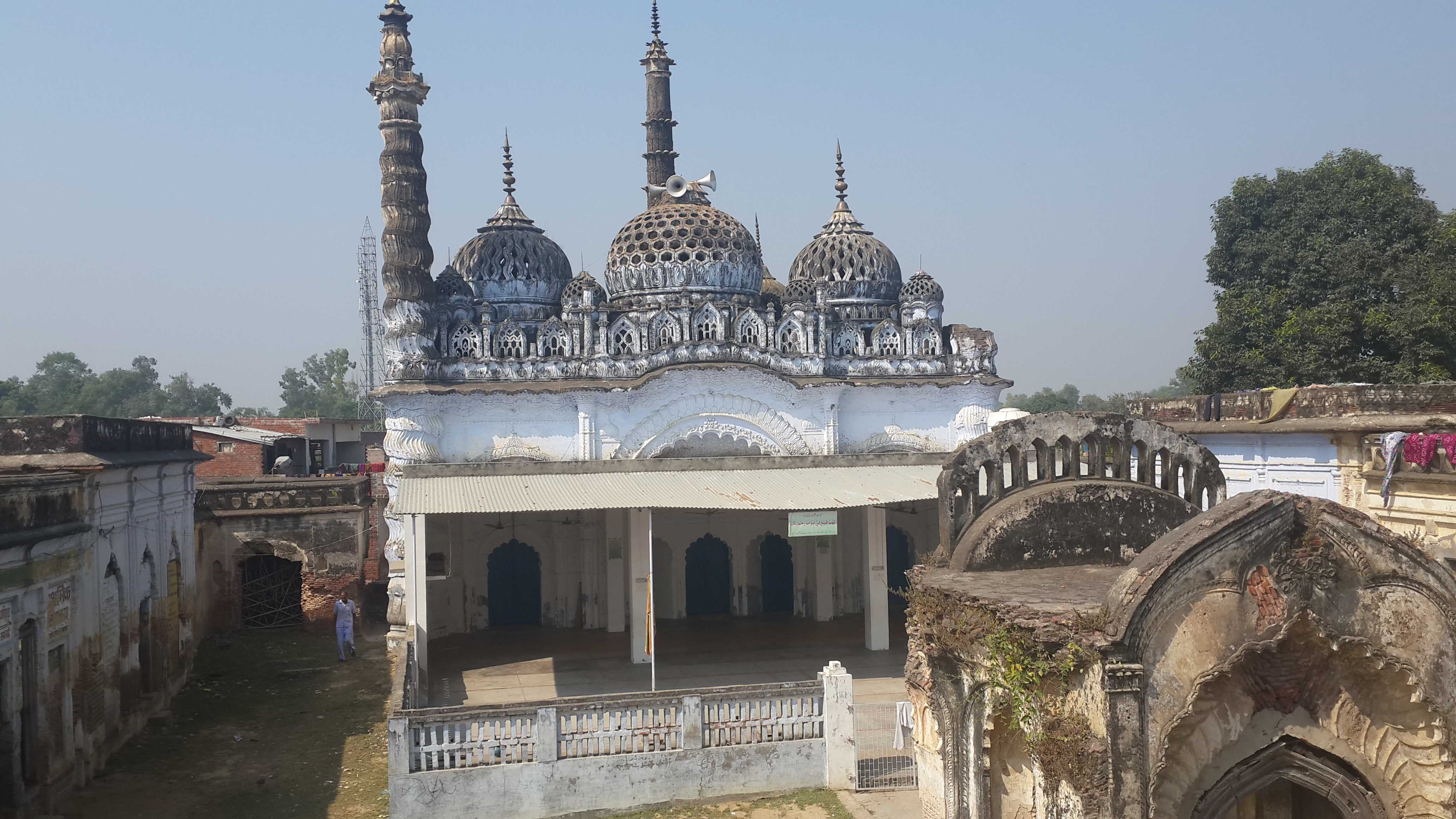
Masjid Imambada Khairabad.

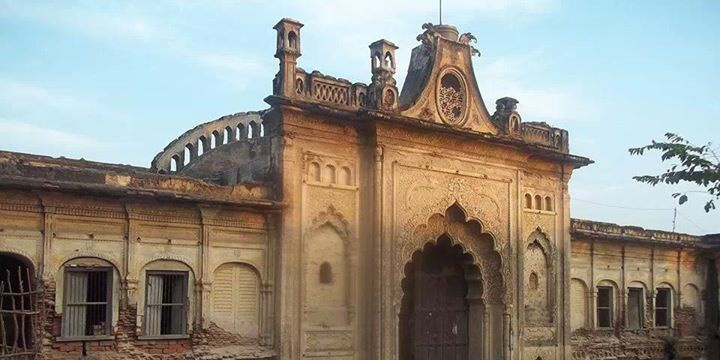
Imambara (Makka Zamidaar) front gate.

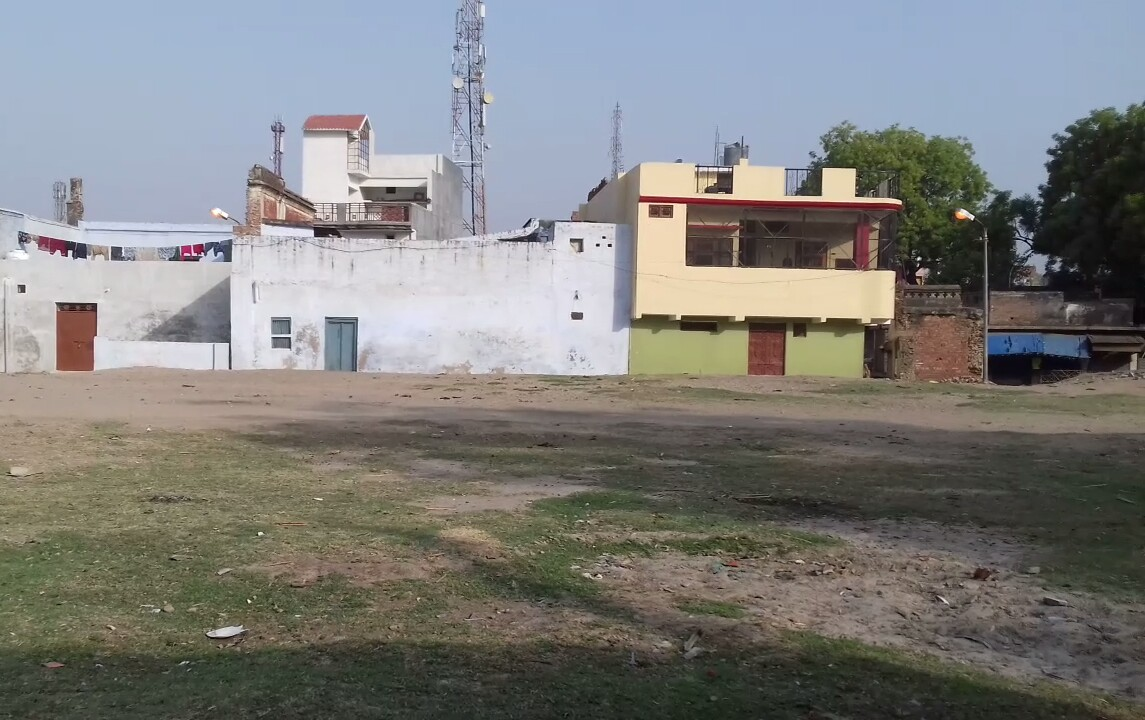
The cricket ground in Khairabad.
