= Muntakhib al-Haqq =

Pakistani Islamic scholar

Muntakhib al-Ḥaqq
- Title: Mawlāna, Dean, Professor

Personal life
- Era: Modern era
- Region: South Asia

Religious life
- Religion: Islam
- Jurisprudence: Hanafi
- Creed: Sunni

Muslim leader
- Influenced by: Fazl-e-Haq Khairabadi

Mawlanā Syed Muntakhab al-Ḥaqq (Urdu: منتخب الحق) was the dean of the faculty of Islamic studies at the University of Karachi, Pakistan, from 1964 to 1972. He was named a jurisconsult to the Federal Shariat Court in 1981, and appointed to the Council of Islamic Ideology in 1982.
