= Prem Parbat =

1973 film by Ved Rahi

- Directed by: Ved Rahi
- Produced by: Shanti Sagar
- Starring: Rehana Sultan
- Music by: Jaidev
- Release date: 16 May 1975
- Country: India
- Language: Hindi

Prem Parbat (transl. Mountain of Love) is a 1973 Hindi-language film directed by Ved Rahi. The film stars Rehana Sultan, Satish Kaul, Nana Palsikar, Agha and Hema Malini in a special appearance. The film has music by Jaidev with lyrics by Jan Nisar Akhtar and Padma Sachdev, and is remembered for its melodies, including Lata Mangeshkar classic "Ye Dil Aur Unki, Nigaaho Ke Saaye", written by Jan Nisar Akhtar and "Mera Chhota Sa Ghardwaar" written by poet Padma Sachdev. According to Rahi, the print of the film got destroyed over time, making it a lost film.

== Plot ==
The film is the story of an orphan girl, whose loyalties are divided between her aged husband and a young forest officer she has fallen in love with. Being the wife of the old Choudhari she is conflicted about her love for another man.

== Cast ==
- Rehana Sultan
- Hema Malini (Spl. appearance)
- Satish Kaul
- Nana Palsikar
- Agha
- Birbal
- Hiralal
- Ajay Chadda
- Indrani Mukherjee

== Soundtrack ==
The film has music by Jaidev while the lyrics were written by Jan Nisar Akhtar and Padma Sachdev. "Ye Dil Aur Unki, Nigaaho Ke Saaye" sung by Lata Mangeshkar featured in the Binaca Geetmala annual list 1974.

- "Ye Dil Aur Unki, Nigaahon Ke Saaye" – Lata Mangeshkar
- "Raat Piya Ke Sang" – Minu Purushottam
- "Mera Chhota Sa Ghar Baar" – Lata Mangeshkar
- "Yeh Neer Kahan Se Barse Hai" – Lata Mangeshkar

The song "Ye Dil Aur Unki, Nigaahon Ke Saaye" is set in raga Pahadi.

== Awards and nominations ==
Minoo Purshottam was nominated for the Filmfare Award for Best Female Playback Singer, for the song "Raat Piya Ke Sang".
