= Hamida Salim =

Indian author, economist, and educator (1922–2015)

Hamida Salim (1922 – 16 August 2015) was an Indian author, economist, and educator, writing primarily in the Urdu language. She was the first woman to graduate from Aligarh Muslim University.

== Personal life ==
Salim was born in 1922 in Rudauli, in Uttar Pradesh. Her family were zamindars. Her brother, Asrar-ul-Haq "Majaz" was also a notable Urdu poet, and another brother, Ansar Harvani, was a member of the Indian independence movement and an elected Member of Parliament. Her sister, Safia Akhtar was also a writer and critic, and her nephew is lyricist and poet Javed Akhtar.

== Writing and career ==
She earned her B.A. in economics in Lucknow. She went on to earn an M.A. in economics from Aligarh Muslim University, becoming their first woman graduate, in 1947. She later earned a second master's from the University of London. Salim taught economics at several public universities in India, including her alma mater, Aligarh Muslim University in Uttar Pradesh, and Jamia Millia Islamia, in Delhi.

She was a well-known author, publishing several notable novels, a memoir, and volumes of poetry in Urdu. Her memoir of her time in Aligarh, as a student, titled, Shorish-e-Dauran was published in 1995. She wrote a second memoir about her siblings, titled Ham Saath The (We Were Together), which is considered a significant contribution to women's writing in Urdu. In addition, Salim wrote two popular novels, Parchhaiyon Ke Ujale (Lights of Shadows) and Hardam Rawan Hai Zindagi (Life is Always on the Move). Both novels were set in her hometown of Rudali in Uttar Pradesh. A critical essay about her brother's Majaz's work and life, titled 'Majaz, My Brother' is also considered a significant contribution to Urdu literary criticism.
