= Singh Bandhu =

Musical duo

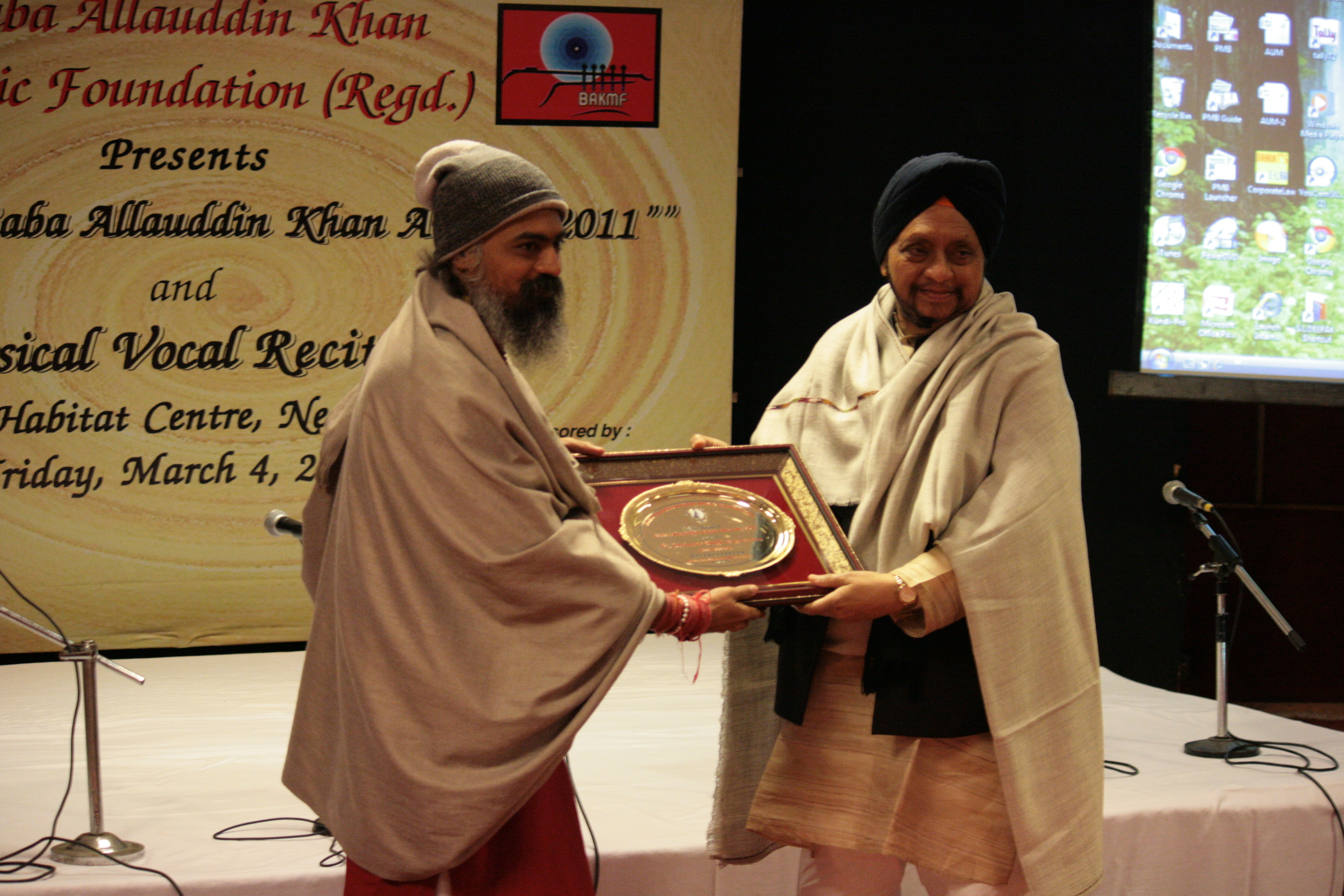
- Surinder Singh (right) of Singh Bandhu receiving the Baba Allauddin Khan Award, 2011

Background information
- Origin: India
- Genres: Hindustani classical music, Shabad
- Members: Tejpal Singh, Surinder Singh

Singh Bandhu is an Indian musical duo composed of brothers Tejpal Singh (b 1937) and Surinder Singh (b 1940), exponents of Hindustani classical music and Sikh music (shabad kirtan).

In 2004, Tejpal Singh and Surinder Singh were given a joint Sangeet Natak Akademi Award from India's National Academy of Music, Dance & Drama. Also in the same year, Surinder Singh was awarded the Padma Shri by the Government of India. By this time (year 2004), the elder brother Tejpal Singh had become reclusive and had mostly stopped singing in public due to poor health.

== Biography ==
They started learning music during their childhood from elder brother G.S. Sardar. They also did Masters in music from Allahabad University.

Subsequently, they learned khayal singing from Amir Khan, the founder of Indore Gharana.

They also performed shabads for the television film, Tamas (1987) directed by Govind Nihalani, including Deh Siva Var Mohe, Avar Na Sujhe and Jo Lare Din Ke.

== Personal life ==
Surinder Singh, younger of the duo, married Dogri language poet Padma Sachdev (1940–2021) in 1966. Padma Sachdev was a Sahitya Akademi Award (1971) and Padma Shri (2001) recipient who wrote poetry in two languages, Dogri and Hindi. The couple first lived in Delhi, but later shifted to Mumbai where Padma Sachdev died in 2021 due to old age. The couple had one daughter, Meeta Sachdev.
