= Salman Akhtar =

Indian-American psychoanalyst and poet

- Born: 31 July 1946 (age 80); Khairabad, United Provinces, British India
- Education: M.B.B.S
- Occupations: Poet; psychoanalyst
- Spouse: Monisha Nayar
- Children: Kabir Akhtar (son); Nishat Akhtar (daughter)
- Father: Jan Nisar Akhtar
- Relatives: Javed Akhtar (brother); Farhan Akhtar (nephew); Zoya Akhtar (niece)

Salman Akhtar (born 31 July 1946) is an Indian-American psychoanalyst practicing in the United States. He is an author, poet, and Professor of Psychiatry and Human Behavior at Jefferson Medical College in Philadelphia.

== Early life ==
Salman Akhtar was born in Khairabad, Uttar Pradesh to Jan Nisar Akhtar, a Bollywood film songwriter and Urdu poet, and Safia Akhtar, a teacher and writer. Akhtar's mother died when he was still young. His grandfather, Muztar Khairabadi, was a poet while his great great grandfather, Fazl-e-Haq Khairabadi, was a scholar of Islamic studies and theology and played an important role in the Indian Rebellion of 1857. He is the brother of veteran poet and film lyricist Javed Akhtar and brother-in-law of actress and social activist Shabana Azmi. His son Kabir Akhtar is an American television director and Emmy-nominated editor. His daughter Nishat Akhtar is an artist and a graphic designer. Through Akhtar's interview with Kamayani Vashisht, Akhtar relays personal and professional stories, as well as information regarding his life as both a psychoanalyst and a poet. According to Akhtar, it was uncommon in his family to become a physician. His immediate family is composed largely of writers, poets, actors, and journalists. He says that he believed his family may have needed a psychoanalyst amongst all of the writers and poets.

== Education and career ==
Salman Akhtar first attended Lucknow school in the town where he grew up, and then received his M.B.B.S. degree at Aligarh Muslim University's Medical School (JNMC) in India. After completing Medical School, Salman Akhtar did his internship at Maulana Azad Medical College of the University of Delhi in India. He completed post-graduate medical education in psychiatry at PGIMER Chandigarh under Psychiatrist N. N. Wig. During this time, he wrote an article "A phenomenological analysis of symptoms in obsessive-compulsive neurosis". He moved to the United States in 1973 and repeated his psychiatric training at the University of Virginia Medical Center in 1976. He obtained psychoanalytic training from the Philadelphia Psychoanalytic Institute in 1986.

Currently, he is Professor of Psychiatry & Human Behavior at Jefferson Medical College and psychiatrist at the Jefferson University Hospital as well as a Training and Supervising Analyst at the Psychoanalytic Center of Philadelphia. He has served on the editorial boards of the International Journal of Psychoanalysis, the Journal of the American Psychoanalytic Association, and The Psychoanalytic Quarterly. Salman Akhtar has authored, edited, or co-edited more than 300 publications, including 100 academic books. He has also served as the Film Review Editor for the International Journal of Psychoanalysis, and is currently serving as the Book Review Editor for the International Journal of Applied Psychoanalytic Studies. He also has published seven collections of poetry and serves as a Scholar-in-Residence at the Inter-Act Theatre Company in Philadelphia. Recent peer-reviewed articles include:

- Visiting the Father's Grave
- Re-Visiting Fred Pine
- On human cruelty
- Deadness: psychoanalytic reflections
- Soft diamonds: poetic sentiment, poetic speech, and poetic specimen in the clinical hour

Akhtar served as a Contributor for the Indian Literature (journal). On the "Contributors" page, he is recognized for numerous of his accomplishments. One of the awards and honors that he has received is the 2012 Sigourney Award. In addition to the many titles he holds, his acknowledgements include his 108 published books as of this journal's publication in 2023. Out of these 108 published books, 41 of them were written by Akhtar alone.

He holds a board certification for the American Board of Psychiatry and Neurology, for which he is certified in Psychiatry. Akhtar holds a 4-year listing on "Philadelphia Magazine's Top Docs."

Addresses and lectures:

- Plenary Address at the Second International Congress of the International Society for the Study of Personality Disorders. This address was given in Oslo, Norway in 1991.
- Plenary Paper at the Second International Margaret S. Mahler Symposium. This address was given in Cologne, Germany in 1993.
- Plenary Paper at the Rencontre Franco-Americaine de Psychanalyse meeting in Paris, France. This was in 1994.
- Keynote Address at the Annual Meetings of Division 39 of the American Psychological Association, which was also in 1994
- Plenary Address at the Annual Meetings of the Canadian Psychoanalytic Association in 2002.
- Keynote Address at the IPA Congress which took place in Rio de Janeiro, Brazil in 2005.

Awards:

- Salman Akhtar received the Journal of the American Psychoanalytic Association's Best Paper of the Year Award. He received this honor in 1995.
- Margaret Mahler Literature Prize, which he received in 1996
- ASPP's Sigmund Freud Award, which he received in 2000
- American Psychoanalytic Association's Edith Sabshin Award, which he received in 2000
- Columbia University's Robert Liebert Award for Distinguished Contributions to Applied Psychoanalysis, which he received in 2004
- APA's Kun Po Soo Award, which he received in 2004
- APA's Irma Bland Award for Outstanding Teacher of Psychiatric Residents in the country, which he received in 2005

== Selected publications ==
- Akhtar, S. (1999). Immigration and Identity. Jason Aronson.
- Akhtar, S. (2007). Listening to Others. Jason Aronson.
- Akhtar, S. (2009). Comprehensive Dictionary of Psychoanalysis. Routledge.
- Akhtar, S. (2012). Psychoanalytic Listening. Routledge.
- Akhtar, S. (2014). Source of Suffering. Routledge.
- Akhtar, S. (2021). Tales of Transformation: A Life in Psychotherapy and Psychoanalysis. Karnac Books.
- Akhtar, S. (2022). In Leaps and Bounds: Psychic Development and its Facilitation in Treatment. Karnac Books.
- Akhtar, S., Savelle-Rocklin, N. (2023). Food Matters: Biopsychosocial Perspectives. Karnac Books.
- Akhtar, S. (2023). Truth: Developmental, Cultural, and Clinical Realms. Karnac Books.
- Akhtar, S., Fallon, A., Rao Gogineni, R. (2023). Besides Family: Extending the Orbit of Psychic Development. Karnac Books.
- Akhtar, S. (2024). In Short: Private Notes of a Psychoanalyst. Karnac Books.
- Akhtar, S. (2024). Unlit Corners: Dirtiness, Miserliness, Shyness, Outrageousness, Shallowness, Indecisiveness, Restlessness, and Cowardliness. Karnac Books.
- Akhtar, S. (2025). Freud in Istanbul: Turkish Contributions to Psychotherapy and Psychoanalysis. Karnac Books.
- Akhtar, S., Eichen, A., Smolar, A. (2025). Marriage and Its Discontents: Variations, Vexations, and Violations. Karnac Books.
- Akhtar, S., Ilahi, M. N., & Gulati, R. (2026). Attics and Basements: The Evocative, Expressive and Embracing Functions of Homes and Other Human Dwellings. Karnac Books.
- Akhtar, S., Savelle-Rocklin, N. (2026). Eyes, Mind and Vision: Visual Realities and Metaphors in Psychoanalysis. Karnac Books.
- Akhtar, S., Kay O'Neil, M. (2026). Anxiety: Clarification, Critique and Update. Karnac Books.
- Akhtar, S., İşcan, S., İşcan, C. (2026). An Enduring Legacy: Revisiting Ten Forgotten Classics on Psychoanalytic Technique. Karnac Books.
- Akhtar, S. (2027). Monasteries, Mausoleums, Museums: Psychoanalytic Architecture of the Soul. Karnac Books.

== Writing and process ==
Akhtar wrote a paper about his mentor, Dr. Narendra Nath Wig, which he says was composed in Heathrow Airport. He also claims that he wrote the Introduction and the Conclusion of one of his books in the Athens Airport. He states this is a trait from his father, who enjoyed writing amongst noise and bustle.

When interviewed by Kamayani Vashisht and asked about his Urdu poetry, Akhtar shares that he intentionally includes at least one English word in each couplet to emulate the combination of English and native language that comes with immigrating to the United States.

Akhtar states that there is no difference in process between writing in English or in Urdu to him. He says that writing poetry takes him approximately three to ten minutes to complete, regardless of the language he is using. He believes there is no reason in editing poetry and prefers not to do so in his own work. When hoping to compile a book of his poems, Akhtar will perhaps change a couple of words if he no longer likes the sound of them, but this part of the process comes a few years after the initial composition of the poems.

== Poetry ==
An example of Urdu poetry; image created by Balti Sahib, uploaded as their own work

In addition to psychoanalytical study, Akhtar is also a published poet. Salman Akhtar has written both English and Urdu poetry. Akhtar is considered "well-regarded" among Urdu poets. A popularized version of Urdu Poetry is Ghazal, which Akhtar has shared thoughts on among this community. He states that ghazals can be spoken or sung. Akhtar comments on the idea of a "bad sher" which refers to a poorly-written couplet in Urdu poetry. Typically, five couplets make up ghazals. It is unknown just how many Akhtar has composed, but at least 24 of them can be found on online collections. His first poetry collection, titled Kubaku, was published in 1976.

=== "Bad sher" ===
In his interview with Kamayani Vashisht, Akhtar shares that he believes 4 major components make up a "bad sher," which he lists as:

- badzuban (written with poor language)
- vulgarity
- meaninglessness
- superficiality (a shallow meaning with no underlying message)

When asked about the connection between being a psychoanalyst and being a poet, Akhtar responds that he does not believe being a psychoanalyst makes him a better poet. If it relates, he believes psychoanalysis is a background theme and perhaps integrated into his poetic work at times.

== Akhtar's "immigrant experience" ==
Akhtar relays his thoughts regarding the "immigrant experience" as it relates to the 1964 movie "Il Gaucho" directed by Italian filmmaker Dino Risi. Akhtar relates the movie to being conducive to the "immigrant experience" based on the distinct experience of hyperfixation on objects like a homeland and thus becoming indignant to the new culture in which they are present.

Akhtar also touches on the idea of "immigrant nostalgia" which he identifies as immigrants thinking of their homeland and thus living in the past, disorienting them from the reality of the time they're in. This explanation provided by Akhtar is applied to the movie as justification for the characters behaving with pathological nostalgia.

== Academic writing and influence ==
Akhtar shares his thoughts on "silence" in terms of psychoanalysis, which are outlined in an article published in The American Journal of Psychoanalysts. He focuses on an analytical approach and setting, which encompass unmentalised, structural, symbolic, and defensive/enactive silences. Akhtar goes into detail about what is deemed as "full silences" and expands upon both regenerative and contemplative silences. Akhtar also references "blank silences" that were first identified and described by Pierre Janet and André Green. Akhtar's point about both full and blank silences, as well as his personal contributions to this topic, are used by Cassullo in this article to further his research.

In an article published in Pastoral Psychology by Christopher Hoskins, Akhtar is referenced in relation to his study on environmental dislocation and ecological self. Akhtar studied migration as it relates to human mental state and identity, and in turn how human beings can develop a better and more profound ecological self. His research centers around the effect that migration has on a person in terms of age when leaving their original place. Akhtar makes the point of he himself immigrating to the United States, and, in turn, feeling like there was a lack of consideration for different cultures in his field of study.

Akhtar's study of psychoanalytic listening is highlighted by Xochitl Marsilli-Vargas in his book "Genres of Listening." Akhtar's different methods of listening that he believes psychoanalysts use are highlighted by Marsilli-Vargas. These various methods that psychoanalysts might employ include subjective, objective, intersubjective, and empathetic listening. Marsilli-Vargas uses the studies from Akhtar's book "Psychoanalytic Listening" to research genres of listening for his work. The genres he studies include Akhtar's list of employed methods while simultaneously expanding and discussing new genres of listening.

In Orna Ophir's book chapter "Looking Evil in the Eye" form the Columbia University press, Akhtar is said to have focused on the idea of "forgiveness" in terms of psychoanalysis. There was a gap in knowledge about the "forgiveness phenomena" until the 1990's and Akhtar was one of the psychoanalysts attempting to change that. Akhtar believed that Sigmund Freud was responsible for this gap since Freud did not believe "forgiveness" needed or warranted scientific observation and notice. Akhtar believed it belonged in a different area of psychoanalysis, but belonged in psychoanalysis nevertheless. He uses examples like the handshake between Yitzhak Rabin and Yasser Arafat from 1995 as an example of forgiveness. Ophir points out that Akhtar does not recognize the lack of a handshake between the Shimon Peres and Arafat due to Rabin's intervention. This act could negate Akhtar's point and possibly symbolize a lack of forgiveness present. Ophir then makes the point that this lack of a handshake, while uncourteous, might actually be a sign that the forgiving interaction is real and authentic because of how much work still needed to be done to bring peace between Palestine and Israel.
