= Purmandal =

- Village
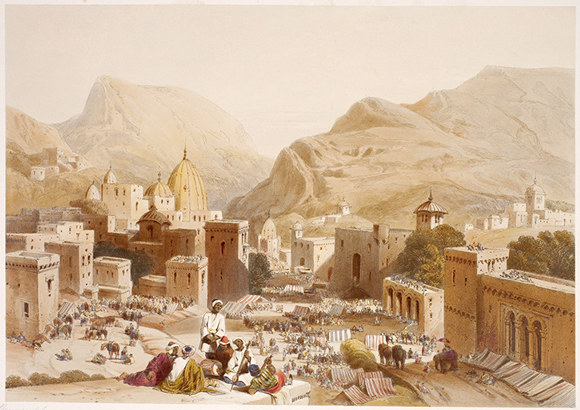
- Festival (mela) at Poormandal, near Jammu in 1846, from a sketch by Charles Hardinge

- Location within Jammu and Kashmir Location within India
- Coordinates: 32.6958°N 75.0586°E
- Country: India
- Union Territory: Jammu and Kashmir
- District: Samba

Population (2011)
  - Total: 1,276

Purmandal (also called Chhota Kashi) is a village located on the Devika River just 14 km from Bari Brahmana in tehsil of Bari Brahmana in the Samba district, Jammu and Kashmir, India. The village and its temples are a pilgrimage site for Hindus, who believe bathing in the river cleanses the soul.

== Geography ==
Front view of main Shiv temple Purmandal

Purmandal is located on the banks of the Devika River in the hills about 30 kilometres (19 mi) southeast of Jammu and about 25 kilometres (16 mi) northwest of Samba by road via Vijaypur.

== Around ==
Devika runs down from Purmandal to Uttarvehni through village Mandal. Uttarvehni in local language (i.e., Dogri) means flowing towards north. It is one of the rare places where a river flows from south to north. Rameshwaram and Bhuteshawar are ancient temples in Mandal.

== Points of interest ==
Purmandal Temple, dedicated to Parvati, is built on the west bank of the river. A number of other temples are dedicated to Shiva. There is a large haveli (mansion) dating from about 1830, in good condition, and several dharamshalas (rest-houses for pilgrims), mostly severely deteriorated. Many of these structures are decorated with murals dating from between 1813 and 1898.

== Transport ==
Buses connect the village to Jammu.

== Events ==
Shadi yatra in Purmanda on Chaitra Chaudish Mela

Every month a Mela is organized here. The devotees take a holy dip in the Devak river and seek blessings. There are total 12 Mela in a year. Every Mela has assigned a unique name corresponding to the month, i.e. Chaitra Chaudish, Shivraatri Mela, etc.
