= Jan Nisar Akhtar =

Urdu author (1914–1976)

- Born: 18 February 1914; Gwalior, Gwalior State, British India
- Died: 19 August 1976 (aged 62); Bombay, Maharashtra, India
- Education: Aligarh Muslim University
- Occupations: Poet, lyricist
- Spouse(s): Safia Siraj-ul-Haq (m. 1943; died 1953) Khadija Talat (m. 1956)
- Children: Javed Akhtar; Salman Akhtar; Uneza Akhtar; Albina Akhtar Sharma; Shahid Khursheed Akhtar
- Parent: Muztar Khairabadi (father)
- Relatives: Fazl-e-Haq Khairabadi (great grandfather)
- Writing career
Language
- Genre: Ghazal
- Notable work: "Khaak-e-dil" (The Ashes of Heart") (1973)
- Movement: Progressive Writers' Movement

Jan Nisar Akhtar (18 February 1914 – 19 August 1976) was an Indian poet of Urdu ghazals and nazms, and a part of the Progressive Writers' Movement, who was also a lyricist for Bollywood.

He was the son of Muztar Khairabadi and great grandson of Fazl-e-Haq Khairabadi, who were both Urdu poets. His career spanned four decades during which he worked with music composers including C. Ramchandra, O.P. Nayyar, Datta Naik also credited as N. Datta and Khayyam and wrote 151 songs. Notable among them were songs from his breakthrough film, A.R. Kardar's Yasmin (1955), Aankhon hi Aankhon Mein in Guru Dutt's CID (1956), Yeh dil aur unki nigahon ke saaye in Prem Parbat (1974) and Aaja re in Noorie (1979) and his last song, Ae Dil-e-naadaan, in Kamal Amrohi's Razia Sultan (1983).

His poetic works include Nazr-e-Butaan, Salaasil, Javidaan, Pichali Pehar, Ghar Angan and Khaak-e-dil. The latter ("The Ashes of Heart") was a poetry collection for which he was awarded the 1976 Sahitya Akademi Award in Urdu by Sahitya Akademi, India's National Academy of Letters.

== Early life ==
Jan Nisar passed his matriculation from Victoria Collegiate High School, Gwalior, and in 1930 joined Aligarh Muslim University, from where he gained his B.A. Honours and M.A. degrees. He started his doctoral work, but had to return to Gwalior due to family conditions.

== Career ==
In 1949, he resigned from his job, moved to Bombay to write lyrics for Urdu/Hindi movies besides ghazals and nazms for general publication. Once in Bombay, he came in touch with other progressive writers, like Mulk Raj Anand, Krishan Chander, Rajinder Singh Bedi and Ismat Chugtai, who often met at Bombay's Silver Fish Restaurant, and subsequently came to be known as 'Bombay Group of Writers'. Success came his way quite late as a film lyricist, till then he was supported by his wife who had stayed back in Bhopal, though she died prematurely of cancer in 1953. Finally, he had a career breakthrough, with Yasmeen (1955), with music by C. Ramchandra. His association with Madan Mohan, the music director resulted in many memorable movie songs. Some of his notable lyrics were, Meri Neendon Mein Tum in Naya Andaz (1956) by Kishore Kumar and Shamshad Begum, Garib Jan Key Hamko Naa Tum Daga Dena sung by Mohammed Rafi in Chhoo Mantar, the hit Piya piya piya... in Baap Re Baap (1955) music by O.P. Nayyar, Aap Yun Faaslon Se by Lata Mangeshkar in Shankar Hussain (1977).

His poetry was secular and like many of the progressive writers of his generation talked of freedom, dignity, economic exploitation and other issues gleaming of the leftist leanings. Even his romanticism which was amply displayed in his ghazals, was replete with references to household and family life. His notable books include Nazr-e-Butaan, Salaasil, Javidaan, Ghar Angan and Khaak-e-Dil (all Urdu titles). One of his many famous couplets is:

Ashaar mere yuu.N to zamaane ke liye hai.n,
kuchh sher faqat unako sunaane ke liye hai.n

Although my poems are meant for the whole world,
There are some couplets meant just for the beloved

He wrote and produced a film, Bahu Begum (1967), starring Pradeep Kumar and Meena Kumari. During the period of four-year to his death he published three collections of his works most important of them being, Khak-e-Dil (The Ashes of Heart"), which has his representative poems from 1935 to 1970, and which won him the Sahitya Akademi Award (Urdu) in 1976. Jan Nisar was commissioned by the first Prime Minister of India, Jawaharlal Nehru to collate the best Hindustani poetry of last 300 years, and later the first edition of the book titled Hindustan Hamara (Our Hindustan) in two volumes was released by Indira Gandhi. It contained Urdu verses on a topics, ranging from love and praise for India and its history, to festivals like Holi and Diwali, on Indian rivers like the Ganges, Yamuna and the Himalayas.

He died in Bombay on 19 August 1976, while he was still working on Kamal Amrohi's film, Razia Sultan (1983). He was nominated posthumously for 1980 Filmfare Best Lyricist Award for "Aaja Re Mere Dilbar" from the film, Noorie.

His anthology, Hindustan Hamara was re-released in Hindi in 2006

== Family ==
In 1943, he married Safia Siraj-ul-Haq, sister of the poet Majaz. Safia worked as a school teacher at an Urdu-medium madarsa (Muslim school). She was meeting a practical necessity, to work outside her home, because Jan Nisar's income was at best sporadic, and it was necessary for her to work to support her children. Thus, when Jan Nisar moved to Mumbai to try his luck at earning a living as a film lyricist, Safia stayed back in Gwalior with their children, and wrote her absent husband a series of letters in Urdu. A collection of these letters, written between 1 October 1943 to 29 December 1953 penned, were first published in 1955 in two volumes under the title, "Harf-e-Aashna" and "Zer-e-Lab." Professor Asghar Wajahat, former Head of the Hindi Department, Jamia Millia Islamia, translated these letters into Hindi and this was published under the title "Tumhare Naam" in 2004.

Safia Akhtar died of cancer on 17 January 1953, less than ten years after her wedding, and left behind two sons. Jan Nisar left the children in the care of relatives while he pursued his hobbies of writing poetry and hobnobbing with various luminaries and socialites in Mumbai. Three years after Safia's death, Jan Nisar, on 17 September 1956, married Khadija Talat.

== Filmography ==
=== Lyricist ===
Year	Film	Music Director(s)	Songs written	Notes
1948	Shikayat	Rasheed Attre	1	First released film
1950	Arzoo	Anil Krishna Biswas	2	
1950	Khel	Sajjad Hussain	2	
1953	Anarkali	Basant Prakash	1	
1954	Barati	Roshan Lal Nagrath	1	
1954	Danka	Aziz Hindi	8	
1954	Dhoop Chhaon	Aziz Hindi	4	
1955	Baap Re Baap	Ramchandra Narhar Chitalkar & Omkar Prasad Nayyar (separately)	11 (All)	
1955	Haseena	Bulo C. Rani	11 (All)	The songs "Dil Pe Kaisi Bekhudi Chhane Lagi..." sung by Asha Bhosle & "Nainon Ke Baan Chale Nasheele..." sung by Sudha Malhotra both were re-used in the film Chalta Purza : Challenge (1958).
1955	Lutera	Ramchandra Narhar Chitalkar	1	
1955	Madhur Milan	Bulo C. Rani	3	
1955	Yasmin	Ramchandra Narhar Chitalkar	9	
1956	C. I. D.	Omkar Prasad Nayyar	1	Uncredited
1956	Chhoo Mantar	Omkar Prasad Nayyar	10 (All)	
1956	Dhake Ki Malmal	Omkar Prasad Nayyar	6	
1956	Jallad	Nashad	1	
1956	Mr. Lambu	Omkar Prasad Nayyar	3	
1956	Naya Andaz	Omkar Prasad Nayyar	11	
1956	Shrimati 420	Omkar Prasad Nayyar	6	
1957	Duniya Rang Rangeeli	Omkar Prasad Nayyar	8 (All)	
1957	Mai Baap	Omkar Prasad Nayyar	2	
1957	Qaidi	Omkar Prasad Nayyar	8 (All)	
1957	Ustad	Omkar Prasad Nayyar	7 (All)	
1958	Chalta Purza : Challenge	Aziz Hindi & Bulo C. Rani (uncredited)	7 (All)	The songs "Dil Pe Kaisi Bekhudi Chhane Lagi..." sung by Asha Bhosle & "Nainon Ke Baan Chale Nasheele..." sung by Sudha Malhotra, both music directed by Bulo C. Rani both were originally made for & used in Haseena (1955), which in turn, were re-used in this film.
1958	Farishta	Omkar Prasad Nayyar	5	
1958	Raagini	Omkar Prasad Nayyar	7	
1959	Black Cat	Dattaram Baburao Naik	7 (All)	
1959	Mr. John	Dattaram Baburao Naik	7 (All)	
1960	Dr. Shaitan	Dattaram Baburao Naik	6 (All)	
1960	Kalpana	Omkar Prasad Nayyar	1	
1960	Rickshawala	Dattaram Baburao Naik	7 (All)	
1960	Road No. 303	C. Arjun	3	
1961	Apsara	Husnlal-Bhagatram	At least 4	
1961	Do Bhai	Dattaram Baburao Naik	6 (All)	
1961	Main Aur Mera Bhai	C. Arjun	6 (All)	
1961	Mr. India	Gurusharan Singh Kohli	6	
1961	Shola Aur Shabnam	Mohammed Zahur Khayyam Hashmi	1-2	
1962	Dilli Ka Dada	Dattaram Baburao Naik	3	
1963	Rustom Sohrab	Sajjad Hussain	2	
1964	Awara Badal	Usha Khanna	1	
1965	Ek Saal Pehle	C. Arjun	3	
1966	Sushila	C. Arjun	6 (All)	Film was revised & re-released as Subah Zaroor Aayegi (1977).
1970	Kaun Ho Tum ?	Usha Khanna	1	
1970	Mangu Dada	C. Arjun	2	
1970	Murder On Highway	C. Arjun	1	
1970	Truck Driver	Sonik-Omi	2	
1971	Kahin Aar Kahin Paar	Ganesh Sharma	1	
1971	Ramu Ustad	Raj Ratan	4 (All)	
1973	Hum Sab Chor Hain : The Criminals	Usha Khanna	2	
1973	Jeevan Sukh	Sapan-Jagmohan	1	
1973	Prem Parbat	Jaidev Verma	2	
1974	Albeli	Kalyanji-Anandji	1	
1974	Alingan	Jaidev Verma	4	
1974	Dastan-e-Laila Majnu	Iqbal Qureshi	11	
1974	Hamrahi	Kalyanji-Anandji	1	
1974	Parinay	Jaidev Verma	1	
1974	Pyase Dil	Mohammed Zahur Khayyam Hashmi	4 (All)	
1975	Andolan	Jaidev Verma	1	
1975	Sandhya	Mohammed Zahur Khayyam Hashmi	3 (All)	
1975	Sangat	Salil Chowdhury	4 (All)	Film was re-released as Kabhi Dhoop Kabhi Chhaon (1992).
1976	Sajjo Rani	Sapan-Jagmohan	5	
1977	Aaina	Naushad Ali	5 (All)	Posthomous release
1977	Aakhri Sajda	Sajjad Hussain	4	Posthomous release
1977	Shankar Husain	Mohammed Zahur Khayyam Hashmi	1	Posthomous release
1977	Subah Zaroor Aayegi	C. Arjun	6	Film was revised version of Sushila (1966); posthomous release
1978	Mutthi Bhar Chawal	Mohammed Zahur Khayyam Hashmi	2	Posthomous release
1979	Chambal Ki Raani	Naushad Ali	2	Posthomous release
1979	Do Shikari	Chitragupta Srivastava	At least 3	Posthomous release
1979	Noorie	Mohammed Zahur Khayyam Hashmi	4	Posthomous release
1980	Ek Gunah Aur Sahi	Jaidev Verma	3 (All)	Posthomous release
1981	Woh Phir Nahin Ayee alias Shyamla	Kanu Roy	2 (All)	Posthomous release
1983	Nigahain	Sardar Malik	1	Posthomous release
1983	Razia Sultan	Mohammed Zahur Khayyam Hashmi	3	Posthomous release
1984	Unchi Uraan	Jeetu-Tapan	2	Posthomous release
1988	Soorma Bhopali	Dilip Sen & Sameer Sen	1	Posthomous release
1992	Kabhi Dhoop Kabhi Chhaon	Salil Chowdhury	4 (All)	Film was re-released version of Sangat (1975); posthomous release

=== Producer ===
- Bahu Begum (1967)

== Works ==
- Khamosh Awaz
- Khak-e-dil, Publisher: Nagara Tabaat, 1973.
- Hindustan Hamara, Volume 1 & 2. 1965, 1974.
- Pichhle Peher.
- GHAR AANGAN.
- Harf-e-ashna: Khatut (Letters)
- Ja-Nisar Akhxtar ki Shai'iri: Urdu Hindi me yakja, tr. by Amar Dihlavi. Publisher Star, 1983.
- Kuliyat-e-Jan Nisar Akhtar. Publisher: Al-Muslim, 1992.
- Hamara Hindustan (anthology), Rajkamal Publications, 2006.
- Nigahon Ke Saaye, ed. Vijay Akela, Rajkamal Publications, 2006. ISBN 81-267-1265-1.
