= Javed Akhtar =

Indian poet and lyricist (born 1945)

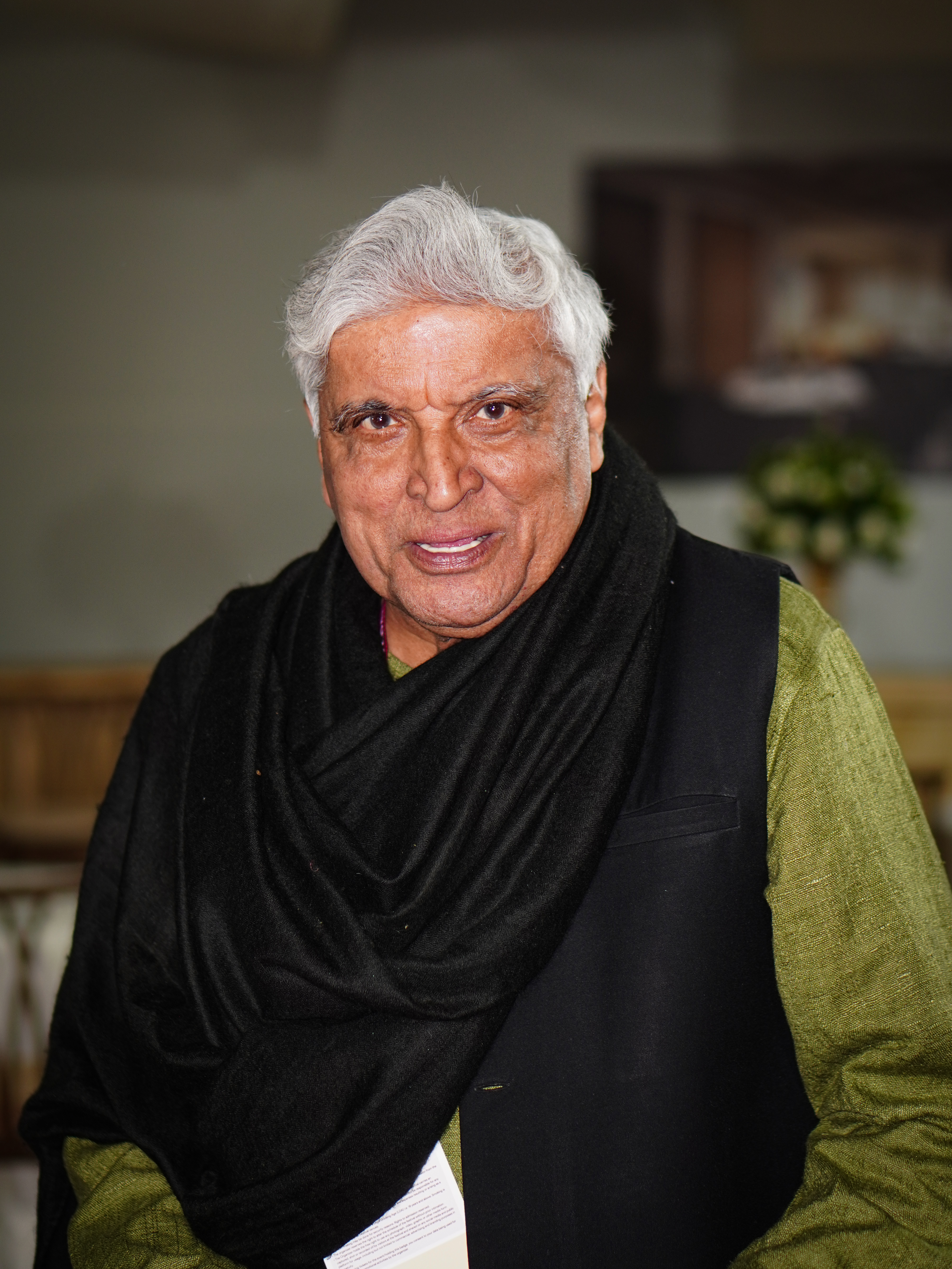
- Javed Akhtar at Jaipur Literature Festival 2026

Member of Parliament, Rajya Sabha
- In office 22 March 2010 – 21 March 2016
- Nominated by: Pratibha Patil
- Succeeded by: Navjot Singh Sidhu
- Constituency: Nominated (Arts)

Personal details
- Pronunciation: [d͡ʒɑːʋɛd̪ əxt̪əɾ]
- Born: 17 January 1945 (age 81) Gwalior, Gwalior State, British India (present-day Madhya Pradesh, India)
- Spouses: Honey Irani (m. 1972; div. 1985) ; 2 children; Shabana Azmi (m. 1984)
- Children: Zoya Akhtar (daughter); Farhan Akhtar (son)
- Parent: Jan Nisar Akhtar (father)
- Relatives: Fazl-e-Haq Khairabadi (great-great- grandfather); Muztar Khairabadi (grandfather); Hamida Salim (aunt); Ansar Harvani (uncle); Majaz (uncle); Salman Akhtar (brother)
- Education: Colvin Taluqdars' College, Saifiya College
- Occupation: Lyricist; Poet; Screenwriter; Political activist
- Awards: 5 National Film Awards; 16 Filmfare Awards; Padma Shri (1999); Padma Bhushan (2007); Richard Dawkins Award (2020)

Javed Akhtar (Note: Urdu pronunciation: [d͡ʒɑː.ʋɛd̪ əxt̪əɾ].) (Urdu pronunciation: [d͡ʒɑːʋɛd̪ əxt̪əɾ]; born 17 January 1945) is an Indian screenwriter, lyricist, poet, and political activist. Renowned for his extensive work in Hindi cinema, he has won five National Film Awards and sixteen Filmfare Awards. He was honoured with the Padma Shri in 1999 and the Padma Bhushan in 2007, two of India's highest civilian honours. He is widely regarded as one of the greatest screenwriters and lyricists in the history of Indian cinema.

Akhtar first gained prominence as one half of the screenwriting duo Salim–Javed, alongside Salim Khan. The pair achieved their breakthrough with Zanjeer (1973) and went on to pen several landmark films, including Deewaar (1975) and Sholay (1975). These works achieved cult status and had a lasting influence on Indian popular culture, particularly through their portrayal of the "angry young man" archetype. Following the duo’s split in the early 1980s, Akhtar transitioned into lyric writing, earning acclaim for his poetic and socially conscious lyrics.

In addition to his film career, Akhtar has been an outspoken public intellectual and activist, known for his advocacy of secularism, freedom of expression, and gender equality. He has written and spoken extensively on issues of religion, human rights, and rationalism. Akhtar served as a nominated member of the Rajya Sabha from 2010 to 2016, representing the arts. He also publicly supported the Communist Party of India (CPI) during the 2019 Indian general election. For his contributions to literature, film, and free thought, he became the first Indian to receive the Richard Dawkins Award in 2020.

In 2024, Amazon Prime Video released a three-part documentary series titled Angry Young Men, focusing on the partnership between Salim Khan and Javed Akhtar. The documentary explores their creative process, personal relationship, and the enduring impact of their films on Indian cinema.

In December 2025, Akhtar participated in a public philosophical debate titled Does God Exist? at the Constitution Club of India, New Delhi, where he discussed questions of faith, morality, and human suffering with Islamic scholar Shamail Nadwi. Approaching the issue from an atheist perspective, Akhtar questioned the idea of divine justice, particularly in the context of civilian suffering in conflict zones. The debate attracted wide media coverage and public discussion in India and abroad.

== Early life ==
Javed Akhtar in 2025

Javed Akhtar was born in 1945 in Gwalior. His father Jan Nisar Akhtar was a songwriter in Hindi films and an Urdu poet. His paternal grandfather Muztar Khairabadi was a poet as was his grandfather's elder brother, Bismil Khairabadi, while his great great grandfather, Fazl-e-Haq Khairabadi, was a religious scholar of Islam. Javed Akhtar's original name was Jadoo, taken from a line in a poem written by his father: "Lamha, lamha kisi jadoo ka fasana hoga". He was given the official name of Javed since it was close to the word jadoo. He spent most of his childhood and was schooled in Lucknow. He graduated from Saifiya College in Bhopal.

== Career as scriptwriter ==
Initially, in the 1970s, there was generally no concept of having the same writer for the screenplay, story and dialogue, nor were the writers given any credits in the titles. Rajesh Khanna is credited with giving Salim Khan and Javed Akhtar their first chance to become screenplay writers by offering them work in Haathi Mere Saathi. Javed Akhtar stated in an interview that one day, he went to Salimsaab and said that Mr. Devar had given him a huge signing amount with which he could complete the payment for his bungalow, Aashirwad. But the film was a remake and the script of the original was far from being satisfactory. "He told us that if we could set right the script, he would make sure we got both money and credit."

Their first big success was the script for Andaz (1971), followed by Haathi Mere Saathi (1971) and Seeta Aur Geeta (1972). They also had hits with Yaadon Ki Baaraat (1973), Zanjeer (1973), Haath Ki Safai (1974), Deewaar (1975), Sholay (1975), Chacha Bhatija (1977), Don (1978), Trishul (1978), Dostana (1980), Kranti (1981), Zamana (1985) and Mr. India (1987). They have worked together in 24 films including two Kannada films – Premada Kanike and Raja Nanna Raja.

Of the 24 films they wrote, 20 were hits. Their scripts which were not successful at box office include Adhikar (1971), Aakhri Dao (1975), Immaan Dharam (1977) and Shaan (1980). Though they split in 1982, due to ego issues, some of the scripts they wrote were made into hit films later, such as Zamana and Mr. India. Salim-Javed, many a time described as "the most successful scriptwriters of all-time", are also noted to be the first scriptwriters in Indian cinema to achieve star status.

== Personal life ==
“There are certain things that I’d like to make clear at the very outset. Don’t get carried away by my name — Javed Akhtar. I am not revealing a secret, I am saying something that I have said many times, in writing or on TV, in public… I’m an atheist, I have no religious beliefs. And I don’t believe in spirituality of some kind".

Akhtar was nominated to the Parliament upper house Rajya Sabha on 16 November 2009. Akhtar was married to Honey Irani, with whom he had two children, Farhan Akhtar, a film actor, producer, director and Zoya Akhtar, a film writer, director and producer. The father-and-son duo have worked together in films such as Dil Chahta Hai, Lakshya, Rock On!! and Zindagi Na Milegi Dobara with Zoya. Farhan was previously married to hair stylist Adhuna Akhtar, they divorced in 2017, and he is currently married to actress and singer Shibani Dandekar.

Despite having an Islamic upbringing, Akhtar declared himself to be an "equal opportunity atheist" who is against all faiths, and also brought up his children Farhan and Zoya Akhtar as atheists. However, he continues to identify as a "cultural Muslim" because of his heritage associated with the Islamic civilization.

Akhtar married Shabana Azmi, the daughter of Urdu poet, Kaifi Azmi and later divorced Irani. Akhtar's uncle, Asrar-ul-Haq "Majaz" was also an Urdu poet. His uncle, Ansar Harvani, was a member of the Indian independence movement and an elected Member of Parliament. Akhtar's aunt, Hamida Salim, was an Indian author, economist and educator as well.

== Awards and nominations ==
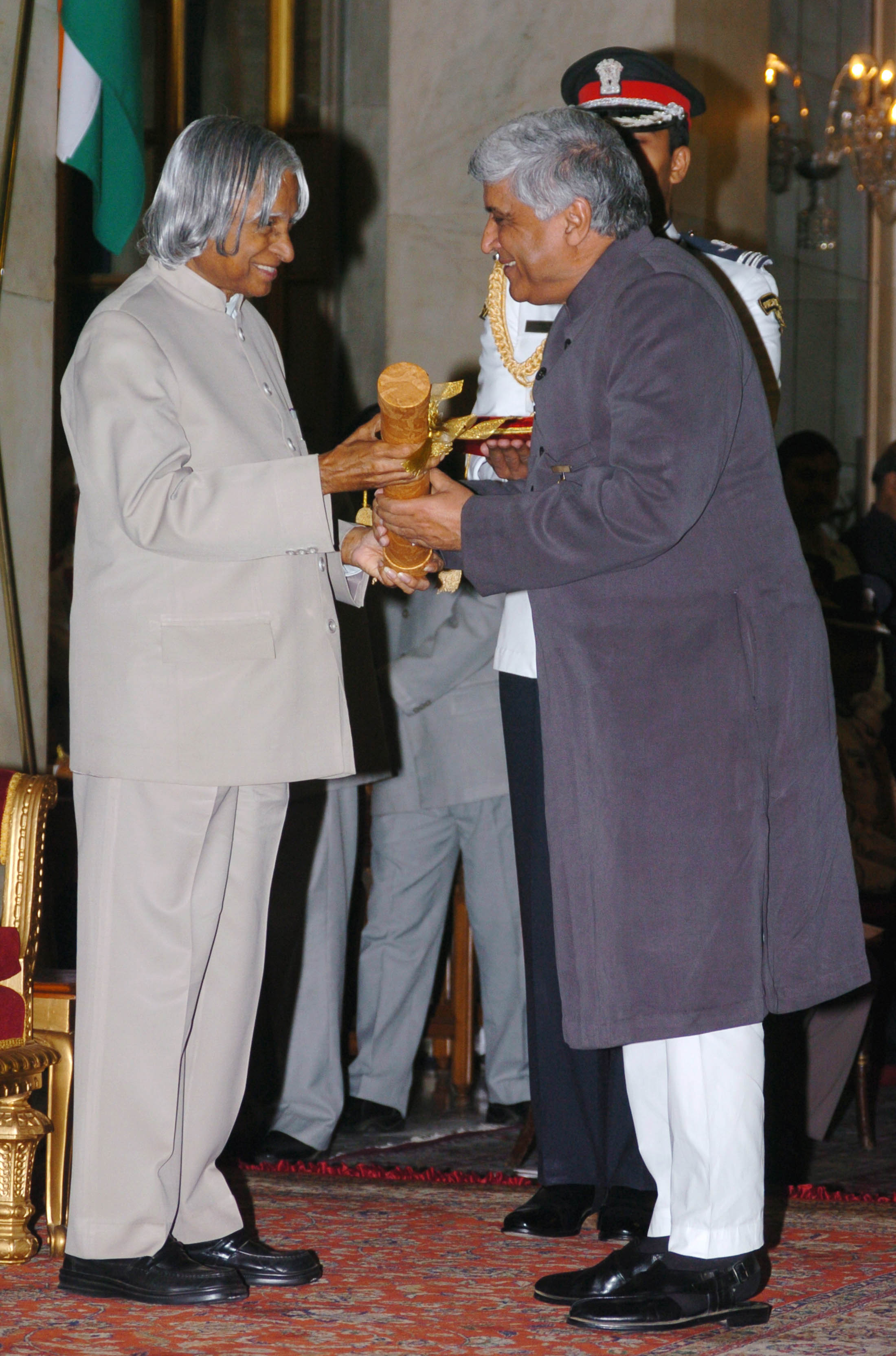
Akhtar receiving Padma Bhushan by the then President A.P.J. Abdul Kalam in 2007.

Javed was awarded the civilian honour of Padma Shri by the Government of India in 1999, followed by the Padma Bhushan in 2007. In 2013, he received the Sahitya Akademi Award in Urdu, India's second highest literary honour, for his poetry collection Lava. In 2019, he was conferred with an honorary doctorate (Doctor of Letters) by the Jamia Hamdard University. In 2020 he was awarded the Richard Dawkins Award for being a "powerful force for secularism, reason, and human rights, challenging superstition and intolerance through his work in poetry, screenwriting, and political activism". In 2023, he received Viswambhara Dr C Narayana Reddy National Literary Award for his contributions to Urdu literature

=== National Film Awards ===
Year	Category	Outcome	Work	Notes
1996	Best Lyrics	Won	Saaz	
1997	Best Lyrics	Won	Border	
1998	Best Lyrics	Won	Godmother	
2000	Best Lyrics	Won	Refugee	
2001	Best Lyrics	Won	Lagaan	

=== Filmfare Awards ===
Year	Category	Outcome	Work	Notes
1974	Best Screenplay	Won	Zanjeer	As "Salim-Javed"
1974	Best Story	Won	Zanjeer	As "Salim-Javed"
1976	Best Story	Won	Deewar	As "Salim-Javed"
1976	Best Dialogue	Won	Deewar	As "Salim-Javed"
1976	Best Screenplay	Won	Deewar	As "Salim-Javed"
1983	Best Screenplay	Won	Shakti	As "Salim-Javed"
1984	Best Story	Nominated	Betaab	
1985	Best Story	Nominated	Mashaal	
1986	Best Story	Nominated	Arjun	
1989	Best Lyricist	Nominated	"Ek Do Teen" from Tezaab	
1990	Best Dialogue	Won	Main Azaad Hoon	
1995	Best Lyricist	Won	"Ek Ladki Ko Dekha" from 1942: A Love Story	
1997	Best Lyricist	Won	"Ghar Se Nikalte" from Papa Kehte Hai	
1998	Best Lyricist	Won	"Sandese Aate Hai" from Border	
1998	Best Lyricist	Nominated	"Chand Taare" from Yes Boss	
1999	Best Lyricist	Nominated	"Mere Mehboob Mere Sanam" from Duplicate	
2001	Best Lyricist	Won	"Panchchi Nadiyaan" from Refugee	
2002	Best Lyricist	Won	"Mitwa" from Lagaan	
2002	Best Lyricist	Nominated	"Radha Kaise Na Jale" from Lagaan	
2004	Best Lyricist	Won	"Kal Ho Na Hoo" from Kal Ho Naa Ho	
2005	Best Lyricist	Won	"Tere Liye" from Veer-Zaara	
2007	Lifetime Achievement Award	Honoured	—N/a	
2009	Best Lyricist	Won	"Jashn-E-Bahaara" from Jodhaa Akbar	

=== Mirchi Music Awards ===
Year	Category	Outcome	Work	Notes
2011	Album of The Year	Nominated	Zindagi Na Milegi Dobara	
2011	Lyricist of The Year	Won	"Khwabon Ke Parindey" from Zindagi Na Milegi Dobara	
2011	Lyricist of The Year	Nominated	"Senorita" from Zindagi Na Milegi Dobara	
2012	Lyricist of The Year	Won	"Jee Le Zara" from Talaash	
2014	Lifetime Achievement Award	Won	-	
2015	Album of The Year	Nominated	Dil Dhadakne Do	
2015	Lyricist of The Year	Nominated	"Phir Bhi Yeh Zindagi" from Dil Dhadakne Do	

== Filmography ==
=== Work as part of Salim-Javed partnership (1971-1982) ===
Year	Film	Language	Director	Cast	Notes
1971	Andaz	Hindi	Ramesh Sippy	Rajesh Khanna, Hema Malini, Shammi Kapoor, Simi Garewal	Written as "Salim-Javed" Although the Salim–Javed partnership ended in 1982, two of their screenplays that had been completed earlier - Zamana and Mr. India, were released after their split.
1971	Adhikar	Hindi	S.M. Sagar	Ashok Kumar, Nanda, Deb Mukherjee	Written as "Salim-Javed" Although the Salim–Javed partnership ended in 1982, two of their screenplays that had been completed earlier - Zamana and Mr. India, were released after their split.
1971	Haathi Mere Saathi	Hindi	M. A. Thirumugham	Rajesh Khanna, Tanuja	Written as "Salim-Javed" Although the Salim–Javed partnership ended in 1982, two of their screenplays that had been completed earlier - Zamana and Mr. India, were released after their split.
1972	Seeta Aur Geeta	Hindi	Ramesh Sippy	Dharmendra, Hema Malini, Sanjeev Kumar	Written as "Salim-Javed" Although the Salim–Javed partnership ended in 1982, two of their screenplays that had been completed earlier - Zamana and Mr. India, were released after their split.
1973	Yaadon Ki Baaraat	Hindi	Nasir Hussain	Dharmendra, Zeenat Aman, Vijay Arora, Tariq Khan	Written as "Salim-Javed" Although the Salim–Javed partnership ended in 1982, two of their screenplays that had been completed earlier - Zamana and Mr. India, were released after their split.
1973	Zanjeer	Hindi	Prakash Mehra	Amitabh Bachchan, Jaya Bhaduri, Pran	Written as "Salim-Javed" Although the Salim–Javed partnership ended in 1982, two of their screenplays that had been completed earlier - Zamana and Mr. India, were released after their split.
1974	Majboor	Hindi	Ravi Tandon	Amitabh Bachchan, Parveen Babi, Pran	Written as "Salim-Javed" Although the Salim–Javed partnership ended in 1982, two of their screenplays that had been completed earlier - Zamana and Mr. India, were released after their split.
1974	Haath Ki Safai	Hindi	Prakash Mehra	Randhir Kapoor, Vinod Khanna, Hema Malini, Simi Garewal, Ranjeet	Written as "Salim-Javed" Although the Salim–Javed partnership ended in 1982, two of their screenplays that had been completed earlier - Zamana and Mr. India, were released after their split.
1975	Deewaar	Hindi	Yash Chopra	Amitabh Bachchan, Shashi Kapoor, Parveen Babi, Neetu Singh	Written as "Salim-Javed" Although the Salim–Javed partnership ended in 1982, two of their screenplays that had been completed earlier - Zamana and Mr. India, were released after their split.
1975	Sholay	Hindi	Ramesh Sippy	Dharmendra, Amitabh Bachchan, Sanjeev Kumar, Hema Malini, Jaya Bhaduri	Written as "Salim-Javed" Although the Salim–Javed partnership ended in 1982, two of their screenplays that had been completed earlier - Zamana and Mr. India, were released after their split.
1975	Aakhri Dao	Hindi	A. Salaam	Jeetendra, Saira Banu, Danny Denzongpa	Written as "Salim-Javed" Although the Salim–Javed partnership ended in 1982, two of their screenplays that had been completed earlier - Zamana and Mr. India, were released after their split.
1976	Premada Kanike	Kannada	V. Somashekhar	Rajkumar, Aarathi	Written as "Salim-Javed" Although the Salim–Javed partnership ended in 1982, two of their screenplays that had been completed earlier - Zamana and Mr. India, were released after their split.
1976	Raja Nanna Raja	Kannada	A. V. Seshagiri Rao	Rajkumar, Aarathi	Written as "Salim-Javed" Although the Salim–Javed partnership ended in 1982, two of their screenplays that had been completed earlier - Zamana and Mr. India, were released after their split.
1977	Immaan Dharam	Hindi	Desh Mukherjee	Amitabh Bachchan, Shashi Kapoor, Sanjeev Kumar, Rekha	Written as "Salim-Javed" Although the Salim–Javed partnership ended in 1982, two of their screenplays that had been completed earlier - Zamana and Mr. India, were released after their split.
1977	Chacha Bhatija	Hindi	Manmohan Desai	Dharmendra, Randhir Kapoor, Hema Malini	Written as "Salim-Javed" Although the Salim–Javed partnership ended in 1982, two of their screenplays that had been completed earlier - Zamana and Mr. India, were released after their split.
1978	Trishul	Hindi	Yash Chopra	Amitabh Bachchan, Sanjeev Kumar, Shashi Kapoor, Hema Malini	Written as "Salim-Javed" Although the Salim–Javed partnership ended in 1982, two of their screenplays that had been completed earlier - Zamana and Mr. India, were released after their split.
1978	Don	Hindi	Chandra Barot	Amitabh Bachchan, Zeenat Aman, Pran	Written as "Salim-Javed" Although the Salim–Javed partnership ended in 1982, two of their screenplays that had been completed earlier - Zamana and Mr. India, were released after their split.
1979	Kaala Patthar	Hindi	Yash Chopra	Amitabh Bachchan, Shashi Kapoor, Rakhee Gulzar, Shatrughan Sinha, Parveen Babi, Neetu Singh	Written as "Salim-Javed" Although the Salim–Javed partnership ended in 1982, two of their screenplays that had been completed earlier - Zamana and Mr. India, were released after their split.
1980	Dostana	Hindi	Raj Khosla	Amitabh Bachchan, Shatrughan Sinha, Zeenat Aman, Pran (actor), Amrish Puri	Written as "Salim-Javed" Although the Salim–Javed partnership ended in 1982, two of their screenplays that had been completed earlier - Zamana and Mr. India, were released after their split.
1980	Shaan	Hindi	Ramesh Sippy	Sunil Dutt, Shashi Kapoor, Amitabh Bachchan, Rakhee Gulzar, Kulbhushan Kharbanda	Written as "Salim-Javed" Although the Salim–Javed partnership ended in 1982, two of their screenplays that had been completed earlier - Zamana and Mr. India, were released after their split.
1981	Kranti	Hindi	Manoj Kumar	Manoj Kumar, Dilip Kumar, Hema Malini, Shashi Kapoor, Shatrughan Sinha, Parveen Babi	Written as "Salim-Javed" Although the Salim–Javed partnership ended in 1982, two of their screenplays that had been completed earlier - Zamana and Mr. India, were released after their split.
1982	Shakti	Hindi	Ramesh Sippy	Dilip Kumar, Amitabh Bachchan, Raakhee, Anil Kapoor	Written as "Salim-Javed" Although the Salim–Javed partnership ended in 1982, two of their screenplays that had been completed earlier - Zamana and Mr. India, were released after their split.
1985	Zamana	Hindi	Ramesh Talwar	Rajesh Khanna, Rishi Kapoor, Poonam Dhillon, Ranjeeta Kaur	Written as "Salim-Javed" Although the Salim–Javed partnership ended in 1982, two of their screenplays that had been completed earlier - Zamana and Mr. India, were released after their split.
1987	Mr. India	Hindi	Shekhar Kapur	Anil Kapoor, Sridevi, Amrish Puri	Written as "Salim-Javed" Although the Salim–Javed partnership ended in 1982, two of their screenplays that had been completed earlier - Zamana and Mr. India, were released after their split.

=== Solo work ===
Year	Film	Language	Director	Cast	Notes
1969	Yakeen	Hindi	Brij Sadanah	Dharmendra, Sharmila Tagore	Dialogues only
1983	Betaab	Hindi	Rahul Rawail	Sunny Deol, Amrita Singh	Written as "Javed Akhtar"
1984	Duniya	Hindi	Ramesh Talwar	Dilip Kumar, Rishi Kapoor, Amrita Singh	Written as "Javed Akhtar"
1984	Mashaal	Hindi	Yash Chopra	Dilip Kumar, Anil Kapoor, Waheeda Rehman	Written as "Javed Akhtar"
1985	Arjun	Hindi	Rahul Rawail	Sunny Deol, Dimple Kapadia	Written as "Javed Akhtar"
1985	Saagar	Hindi	Ramesh Sippy	Rishi Kapoor, Kamal Haasan, Dimple Kapadia	Written as "Javed Akhtar"
1985	Meri Jung	Hindi	Subhash Ghai	Anil Kapoor, Meenakshi Sheshadri	Written as "Javed Akhtar"
1987	Dacait	Hindi	Rahul Rawail	Sunny Deol, Meenakshi Sheshadri	Written as "Javed Akhtar"
1989	Joshilaay	Hindi	Sibte Hassan Rizvi, Shekhar Kapur	Sunny Deol, Anil Kapoor, Sridevi, Meenakshi Sheshadri	Written as "Javed Akhtar"
1989	Main Azaad Hoon	Hindi	Tinnu Anand	Amitabh Bachchan, Shabana Azmi	Written as "Javed Akhtar"
1992	Khel	Hindi	Rakesh Roshan	Anil Kapoor, Madhuri Dixit	Written as "Javed Akhtar"
1993	Roop Ki Rani Choron Ka Raja	Hindi	Satish Kaushik	Anil Kapoor, Sridevi	Written as "Javed Akhtar"
1995	Prem	Hindi	Satish Kaushik	Sanjay Kapoor, Tabu	Written as "Javed Akhtar"
1998	Kabhi Na Kabhi	Hindi	Priyadarshan	Anil Kapoor, Jackie Shroff	Written as "Javed Akhtar"
2004	Lakshya	Hindi	Farhan Akhtar	Hrithik Roshan, Preity Zinta, Amitabh Bachchan	Written as "Javed Akhtar"
2006	Don: The Chase Begins Again	Hindi	Farhan Akhtar	Shah Rukh Khan, Priyanka Chopra	Remake of Don (1978)

=== Work as lyricist ===
- Silsila (1981)
- Saath Saath (1982)
- Duniya (1984)
- Mashaal (1984)
- Saagar (1985)
- Arjun (1985)
- Mr. India (1987)
- Tezaab (1988)
- Jaadugar (1989)
- Joshilaay (1989)
- Mil Gayee Manzil Mujhe (1989)
- Sailaab (1990)
- Jamai Raja (1990)
- Hafta Bandh (1991)
- Narsimha (1991)
- Khel (1992)
- Drohi (1992)
- Roop Ki Rani Choron Ka Raja (1993)
- Yugandhar (1993)
- Gardish (1993)
- 1942: A Love Story (1994)
- Papa Kehte Hai (1996)
- Dastak (1996)
- Sardari Begum (1996)
- Diljale (1996)
- Sapnay (Partially Shot at Same time) (1997)
- Border (1997)
- Virasat (1997)
- Daud (1997)
- Mrityudand (1997)
- Saaz (1997)
- Yes Boss (1997)
- Darmiyaan: In Between (1997)
- Aur Pyaar Ho Gaya (1997)
- Jeans (1997)
- Wajood (1998)
- Kabhi Na Kabhi (1998)
- Bada Din (1998)
- Duplicate (1998)
- 1947 Earth (1999)
- Godmother (1999)
- Baadshah (1999)
- Arjun Pandit (1999)
- Laawaris (1999)
- Dillagi (1999)
- Phir Bhi Dil Hai Hindustani (2000)
- Refugee (2000)
- Karobaar (2000)
- Hamara Dil Aapke Paas Hai (2000)
- Raja Ko Rani Se Pyar Ho Gaya (2000)
- Champion (2000)
- Gang (2000)
- Dil Chahta Hai (2001)
- Zubeidaa (2001)
- Lagaan (2001)
- Abhay (2001)
- Moksha (2001)
- Pyar Ki Dhun (2002)
- Agni Varsha (2002)
- Mere Yaar Ki Shaadi Hai (2002)
- Badhaai Ho Badhaai (2002)

| class="col-break " style="width: 25%; " |

- Yeh Kya Ho Raha Hai? (2002)
- Satta (2003)
- Love at Times Square (2003)
- The Hero: Love Story of a Spy (2003)
- Armaan (2003)
- Chalte Chalte (2003)
- Kuch Naa Kaho (2003)
- Kal Ho Naa Ho (2003)
- L.O.C. Kargil (2003)
- Tehzeeb (2003)
- Main Hoon Na (2004)
- Veer-Zaara (2004)
- Lakshya (2004)
- Charas (2004)
- Kyun! Ho Gaya Na... (2004)
- Dobara (2004)
- Swades (2004)
- Bose: The Forgotten Hero (2004)
- Kisna: The Warrior Poet (2005)
- Mangal Pandey: The Rising (2005)
- Dil Jo Bhi Kahey... (2005)
- Kabhi Alvida Naa Kehna (2006)
- Don (2006)
- Traffic Signal (2007)
- Namastey London (2007)
- Ta Ra Rum Pum (2007)
- Dhan Dhana Dhan Goal (2007)
- Om Shanti Om (2007)
- Jodhaa Akbar (2008)
- Rock On!! (2008)
- Luck by Chance (2009)
- Life Partner (2009)
- What's Your Raashee? (2009)
- Wake Up Sid (2009)
- My Name is Khan (2010)
- Karthik Calling Karthik (2010)
- Khelein Hum Jee Jaan Sey (2010)
- Aisha (2010)
- Red Alert: The War Within (2010)
- Prem Kaa Game (2010)
- Don 2: The King is Back (2011)
- Ekk Deewana Tha (2012)
- Talaash (2012)
- Vishwaroop (2013)
- Dil Dhadakne Do (2015)
- Rock On 2 (2016)
- Mohenjo Daro (2016)
- Raees (2017)
- Poster Boys (2017) — Segment: Kudiyan Shehar Diyan
- Gold (2018)
- Paltan (2018)
- Namastey England (2018)
- Gully Boy (2019)
- Panipat (2019)
- Panga (2020)
- Toofaan (2021)
- The Archies (2023)
- Dunki (2023)
- Kho Gaye Hum Kahan (2023)
- Yudhra (2024)
- Border 2 (2026) — Lyrics reused from Border (1997)
- Governor (2026)
- Batwara 1947 (2026)

=== Work as a dialogue writer only ===
- Yakeen (1969)

== Bibliography ==
- Tarkash (1995)
- Lava (2012)
