= Fazl-e-Haq Khairabadi =

Indian Islamic scholar and poet (1796–1861)

- Title: Allama

Personal life
- Born: 1796 or 1797 Khairabad, Awadh
- Died: 19 August 1861 (aged 64–65) Andaman Islands, British India
- Known for: Assisting the Indian Rebellion of 1857
- Occupation: Mufti, scholar, theologian and poet

Religious life
- Religion: Islam
- Denomination: Sunni
- Jurisprudence: Hanafi
- Creed: Maturidi

Fazl-e-Haq Khairabadi (1796/1797 – 19 August 1861) was a Hanafi mufti, Kalam scholar, Maturidi theologian, and poet. He was an activist of the Indian independence movement and campaigned against British colonialism. He issued an early religious edict in favour of doing military jihad against British colonialism during 1857 and inspired various others to participate in the 1857 rebellion. He wrote Tahqeeq al-Fatwa Fi Abtal al-Taghwa in refutation of Ismail Dehlvi's Taqwiyat al-Iman and authored books such as al-Thawra al-Hindiyya.

== Early life and education ==
Fazl-e-Haq was born in 1796 or 1797 in Khairabad, Sitapur (now Uttar Pradesh, India). (Note: His birth year is given as 1796 by the Indian History Congress, but as 1797 by different sources including Asir Adrawi.) His father Fazl-e-Imam Khairabadi was Sadr al-Sadur, the chief advisor to the Mughals regarding religious matters. He was known for his expertise in the intellectual and rational sciences, for which he was given the title Imam-i Maqulat (“leader in the intellectual sciences”). He was well acquainted with the teachings of the Shiraz School of philosophy in its specific tradition. Fazl-e-Imam wrote a number of scholarly works, many of which survive only in manuscript form, including a commentary on Mir Damad's al-Ufuq al-Mubin. His work Mirqat remains part of the Dars-i Nizami curriculum in South Asia, especially in the study of logic.

Fazl-e-Haq began his scholarly education under the tutelage of his father Fazl-e-Imam. He studied Hadith with Shah Abd al-Qadir Muhaddith Delhawi and Shah Abd al-Aziz. In Sufism, he was a student of Hafiz Muhammad Ali Khairabadi. He also studied Ibn 'Arabi's Fusus al-Hikam with Hafiz Khairabadi, who was a spiritual representative of Shah Sulaiman Tonswi. The latter was a leading Chishti Sufi of the Indian subcontinent and a teacher of the Akbarian scholar Pir Mihr Ali Shah Golrawi.

== Career ==
Fazl-e-Haq became a teacher by the age of 13. In 1828, he was appointed to the position of mufti in the Department of Qaza. Besides being a scholar of Islamic studies and theology, he was also a literary persona, especially of Urdu, Arabic and Persian literature. More than 400 couplets in Arabic are attributed to him. He edited the first diwan of Mirza Ghalib on his request. He followed the Hanafi school of thought and was a theologian of the Maturidi school, he was also a poet.

On account of his deep knowledge and erudition, he was bestowed with the title of "Allama" and later was venerated as a great Sufi. He was also called the Imam of logic, philosophy and literature. He was considered by scholars to be the final authority on issuing fatwas or religious rulings.

He possessed a great presence of mind and was very intelligent. There are many stories about his repartee with Mirza Ghalib and other contemporary eminent poets, writers and intellectuals. He and his son Abdul al-Haq Khairabadi established Madrasa Khairabad in northern India, where many scholars got educated. He wrote Risala al-Thawra al-Hindiyya in Arabic language and wrote an account of the rebellion called al-Thawra al-Hindiyya.

=== Fatwas against Wahhabi and Deobandi beliefs ===
Khairabadi, in his career, had written various Masnavis against Wahhabis. In 1825, Khairabadi issued fatwas against Ismail Dehlvi for his doctrine of God's alleged ability to lie (Imkan al-Kidhb). Ismail is considered as an intellectual ancestor of Deobandis. Darul Uloom Deoband, founder Rashid Ahmad Gangohi later accepted Dehlvi's doctrines of Imkan al-Kidhb by stating that God has the ability to lie. This doctrine is called Imkan al-Kidhb. According to this doctrine, because God is omnipotent, God is capable of lying. Gangohi supported the doctrine that God has the ability to make additional prophets after Muhammad (Imkan al-Nazir) and other prophets equal to Muhammad.

Allama Fazl-e-Haq Khairabadi refuted these theories and wrote that, according to the Qur'an and Hadith, Muhammad is the final prophet, and there can be no other prophet or "messenger" after him. To believe that there can be another Muhammad would necessitate that Allah did something apart from what he has stated in the Qur'an, that is, that Allah has lied. Lying is a flaw, and it is impossible for Allah to have a flaw.

=== Jihad against British governance ===
As the Indians started to struggle against British occupation, Khairabadi conducted several private meetings with the Mughal emperor Bahadur Shah Zafar, which continued until May 1857. On June 26, 1857, when General Bakht Khan along with his army of 14000, reached Delhi from Bareilly, Khairabadi gave a Friday sermon, attended by a plethora of Muslim scholars and issued a religious edict supporting jihad against the colonial government. The fatwa was signed by Sadruddin Azurda, Abdul Qadir, Faizullah Dehalvi, Faiz Ahmed Badayuni, Wazir Khan, and Syed Mubarak Shah Rampuri. Through this edict, he inspired people to participate in 1857 rebellion..

He was arrested by the British authorities on January 30, 1859, at Khairabad for inciting violence. He was tried and found guilty of encouraging murder and role in the rebellion. The authorities considered him "extraordinary intelligence and acumen who should be reckoned as the most dangerous threat to the British presence in India, and therefore must be evicted from the Indian mainland. He was accused of being the major force behind the mutiny, persuading masses to rise in revolt against the authority of the Company, campaigning and motivating masses to join the mutiny by calling it war of independence and issuing Fatwas inciting violence and making provocative speeches.

He had chosen to be his own counsel and defended himself utilizing arguments and a manner in which he defended his case that was so convincing that the presiding magistrate was writing a judgement to exonerate him, when he confessed to giving the fatwa, declaring that he could not lie. He was sentenced to life in prison in the Andaman Islands, and his property was confiscated by the judicial commissioner of Awadh court and his family shifted to Gwalior. He reached Andaman Island on October 8, 1859, aboard the steam frigate Fire Queen. He would remain imprisoned there until his death in 1861. One of the major reasons for the outbreak of war was the fear among the people that the Christian British government was going to destroy their religions and convert Indians to Christianity.

== Literary works ==
Khairabadi wrote Tahqeeq al-Fatwa Fi Abtal al-Taghwa refuting Ismail Dehlvi's Taqwiyat al-Iman. His other works include:

- al-Hidayah al-Sayyidiyya
- al-Raudh al-Majud : Maslahi Wahdat al-Wujud Ki Buland Payah Takhliq
- al-Ḥashiyya lil-Mawlawi Fazl e Haq Khairabadi ʻala Sharh al-Salam lil-Qadi Mubarak
- al-Thawra al-Hindiyya

== Personal life ==
He was Farooqui. His father was Imam Fazl-e-Iman. One of his sons, Abdul Haq, was also a leading and respected scholar and was given the title of Shams al-Ulama. His grandson was Muztar Khairabadi. Renowned poet and lyricist Jan Nisar Akhtar was his great-grandson and Javed Akhtar, Farhan Akhtar and Zoya Akhtar all are his descendants.

Among his sons, Abdul Haq Khairabadi was a rational scholar and a teacher of Majid Ali Jaunpuri.

== Death ==
He stayed for 22 months in captivity at Andaman, Allama wrote a number of eyewitness accounts in the form of verses in Arabic (Qaseeda), apart from a book al-Thawra al-Hindiyya which is an analysis of the war and events of 1857. This is also the first ever book on the events of 1857. Fazl-e-Haq Khairabadi died on August 19, 1861, in exile on the Andaman Islands.

== See also ==
- Islam in India
- Shah Abdur Rahim
- Shah Waliullah Dehlawi
- Muntakhib al-Haqq
- Ahmadullah Shah
