= List of songs recorded by Lata Mangeshkar =

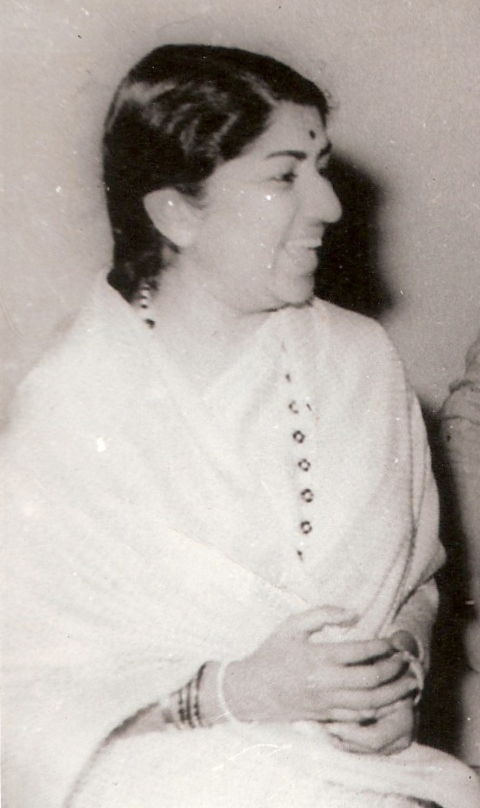
Mangeshkar in 1953

Lata Mangeshkar (born Hema Mangeshkar; 28 September 1929 – 6 February 2022) was an Indian legendary playback singer, music producer and music director who made music in Hindi and other Indian languages. Many of her old songs have featured in various new films (Bollywood or Indian films) and have also been credited. But such songs, unless re-recorded, are not enlisted below.

NOTE: This article does not contain all songs sung by Mangeshkar. Garhwali Song - Man Bharmege

== Hindi songs ==
=== 1940s ===
==== 1945 ====
Film	Song	Composer(s)	Writer(s)	Co-artist(s)
Badi Maa	"Janani Janambhooh Mi... Tum Maa Ho Badi Maa"	K. Dutta		Meenakshi
Badi Maa	"Mata Tere Charnon Men"	K. Dutta		Ishawarlal, Chorus

==== 1946 ====
Film	Song	Composer(s)	Writer(s)	Co-artist(s)
Jeven Yatra	"Chidiya Bole Choon Choon Maina Bole Hoon"	Vasant Desai		
Sona Chandni	"Pyare Bapu Ki"	Tufail Farooqi		
Subhadra	"Main Khili Khili Phulvari"	Vasant Desai		
Subhadra	"Piya Aayega Gori Shudh Na Bisaar"	Vasant Desai		
Subhadra	"Sanwariya O Basuriya O Bajaai Gayo Re"	Vasant Desai		
Aap Ki Sewa Mein	"Ab Kaun Sunega Mere Man Ki Baat"	Datta Daavjekar		
Aap Ki Sewa Mein	"Ek Naye Rang Men Duje Umang Men"	Datta Daavjekar		
Aap Ki Sewa Mein	"Chalo Ho Gayi Taiyar"	Datta Daavjekar		

==== 1947 ====
Film	Song	Composer(s)	Writer(s)	Co-artist(s)
Shadi Se Pehle	"Paa Laguu Kar Joda Jodi Hori Shyam Mose Na"	Paigankar and Karnard		Mohammed Rafi
Shehnai	"Jawani Ki Rel Chali"	C. Ramchandra		Geeta Dutt, C. Ramchandra

==== 1948 ====
Film	Song	Composer(s)	Writer(s)	Co-artist(s)
Andho Ka Sahara	"Main To Naacho Chhama Chham Naach Re"	S. Parsekar		
Anokha Pyar	"Aye Dil Meri Wafa Men"	Anil Biswas		Ira Nagrath
Anokha Pyar	"Aye Dil Meri Wafa"	Anil Biswas		
Anokha Pyar	"Ek Dil Ka Lagana"	Anil Biswas		
Anokha Pyar	"Bhola Bhala Ri Mera"	Anil Biswas		
Anokha Pyar	"Ghadi Ghadi Poocho Na"	Anil Biswas		
Anokha Pyar	"Jevan Sapna Toot Gaya"	Anil Biswas		
Anokha Pyar	"Mere Liye Wo Gham E Intezaar"	Anil Biswas		
Anokha Pyar	"Mere Phoolon Men Chhipi Hai"	Anil Biswas		
Anokha Pyar	"Yaad Rakhna Chand"	Anil Biswas		
Anokha Pyar	"Yaad Rakhna Chand"	Anil Biswas		Mukesh
Asha	"Sajna Re Tori Kaun Dagariya"	Khemchand Prakash		
Asha	"Chet Chet Kar Chal Madhur Nar"	Khemchand Prakash		
Asha	"Door Jaye Re Raah Meri Aaj Teri Raah Se"	Khemchand Prakash		
Asha	"Ek Moorat Manohar Meri Ankhiyan Ko Tarse"	Khemchand Prakash		
Asha	"Kit Jaye Base He Murari Tohe Dhoondhat Radha"	Khemchand Prakash		
Bihari	"Sab Se Ki Durfishani Phoolon Ka Samiyana"	N. Bhattacharya		
Chand Sitare	"Aye Duniya Ki Malik Mujhe Tujhse Mila Hai"	Premnath		
Chand Sitare	"Jab Dil Men Tere Dard"	Premnath		
Chand Sitare	"Meri Naav Chale Dheere Dheere"	Premnath		
Chunaria	"Ankh Meri Lad Gayi"	Hansraj Behl		Inder Goyal
Didi	"Tere Nainon Men Nindiya Nindiya Men Sapne"	Mukund Masurekar		
Dukhiyari	"Ab Kisko Sunaoon Main Katha Krishna"	Gyan Dutt		
Gajre	"Baras Baras Badli"	Anil Biswas		
Gajre	"Chali Dulhan Baratiyon Ke"	Anil Biswas		Ira Nagrath
Gajre	"Ghar Yahan Basane Aaye The"	Anil Biswas		
Gajre	"Kab Tak Kategi Zindagi Kinare Kinare"	Anil Biswas		
Gajre	"Preetam Tera Mera Pyar"	Anil Biswas		
Heer Ranjha	"Kaise Katoo Yeh Kali Raaten Aa Balam"	Aziz Khan		
Heer Ranjha	"Kahe Ko Byahi Bides"	Aziz Khan		
Heer Ranjha	"Khamosh Fasana Hai"	Aziz Khan		G.M. Durrani
Khidki	"Khushiyan Manaye"	C. Ramchandra		Mohantara, Shamshad Begum
Khidki	"Tere Bina Soona"	C. Ramchandra		Geeta Dutt, C. Ramchandra
Majboor	"Ab Koi Jee Ke Kya Kare"	Ghulam Haider		
Majboor	"Angrezi Chhora Chala Gaya"	Ghulam Haider		Mukesh
Majboor	"Dil Mera Toda"	Ghulam Haider		
Majboor	"Gori Sakhiyon Se"	Ghulam Haider		Geeta Dutt
Majboor	"Har Shei Pe Jawani Hai"	Ghulam Haider		Geeta Dutt
Mandir	"Lo Woh Aayi Nindiya Chhup Chup Dheere"	Vasant Desai		
Mere Lal	"Hamara Ghar Ban Jaye Mehlon Se Pyara Sundar"	Purushottam		
Meri Kahaani	"Dilwalon Dilon Ka Mel Dilon Ka Khel"	K. Dutta		
Meri Kahaani	"Nehin Nehin Boondaniyan Jiya Lehraye"	K. Dutta		
Nadiya Ke Paar	"Ho Gori Ho Chori Kahan Chali Ho"	C. Ramchandra		C. Ramchandra
Padmini	"Bedard Tere Dard Ko Seene Se Laga Ke"	Ghulam Haider		
Shaheed	"Pinjre Men Bulbul Bole (not included)"	Ghulam Haider		Madam Mohan
Ziddi	"Ab Kaun Sahara Hai Jab Tera Sahara"	Khemchand Prakash		
Ziddi	"Chanda Re Ja Re Ja Piya Se Sandesa Mora"	Khemchand Prakash		
Ziddi	"Jadu Kar Gai Kisi Ke Naina"	Khemchand Prakash		
Ziddi	"Rooth Gaye More Shyam Sakhi Re"	Khemchand Prakash		
Ziddi	"Tujhe O Bewafa Hum Zindagi Ka Aasra"	Khemchand Prakash		
Ziddi	"Ye Kaun Aaya Re Karke Ye"	Khemchand Prakash		Kishore Kumar

==== 1949 ====
Film	Song	Composer(s)	Writer(s)	Co-artist(s)
Aiye	"Itni Badi Duniya Men"	Shaukat Haidri		
Aiye	"Kis Liye Ankhon Men Aansoo"	Shaukat Haidri		
Aiye	"Aa Bhie Jaa Janewale"	Shaukat Haidri		
Aiye	"Aaiye Aao Chale Wahan"	Shaukat Haidri		Mubarak Begum
Aiye	"Duniya Badal Gayi"	Shaukat Haidri		G.M. Durrani
Aiye	"Kar Sakega Na Juda"	Shaukat Haidri		G.M. Durrani
Aiye	"Jiya Dole Kisi Khayalin Men"	Shaukat Haidri		Shaukat Haidri
Andaz	"Meri Ladli Re Bani Hai"	Naushad	Majrooh Sultanpuri	
Andaz	"Koi Mere Dil Men"	Naushad	Majrooh Sultanpuri	
Andaz	"Uthaye Ja Unke Sitam"	Naushad	Majrooh Sultanpuri	
Andaz	"Tod Diya Dil Mera"	Naushad	Majrooh Sultanpuri	
Andaz	"Darna Mohabbat"	Naushad	Majrooh Sultanpuri	
Andaz	"Yun To Apas Men"	Naushad	Majrooh Sultanpuri	Mohammed Rafi
Andaz	"Sunlo Dil Ka Afsana" (not included)	Naushad	Majrooh Sultanpuri	Mohammed Rafi
Bangala Bhedi	"Haunsale Dil Ke Mitti Pyar Ke Arman Gaya"	P. Ramakant		
Bangala Bhedi	"Man Men Teri Yaad Basi Ankhon Men Hai Pyar"	P. Ramakant		
Barsaat	"Barsaat Men Humse Mile" (title song)	Shankar Jaikishan		
Barsaat	"Hawa Men Udta Jae Mera Lal Dupatta"	Shankar Jaikishan		
Barsaat	"Jiya Beqarar Hai Chhayi Bahaar Hai"	Shankar Jaikishan		
Barsaat	"Mujhe Kisi Se Pyar Ho Gaya"	Shankar Jaikishan		
Barsaat	"Meri Ankhon Men Bas Gaya Koi"	Shankar Jaikishan		
Barsaat	"Ab Mera Kaun Sahara"	Shankar Jaikishan		
Barsaat	"Bichhde Hue Pardesi"	Shankar Jaikishan		
Barsaat	"Hans Mukh Phoolon Yeh Mat Bhoolo"	Shankar Jaikishan		
Barsaat	"Patli Kamar Hai"	Shankar Jaikishan		Mukesh
Barsaat	"Chhod Gaye Balam"	Shankar Jaikishan		Mukesh
Balam	"Pardesi Musafir Kise Karta"	Husnlal Bhagatram	Qamar Jalalabadi	Suraiya
Balam	"Duniya Waloun"	Husnlal Bhagatram	Qamar Jalalabadi	Suraiya
Bazaar	"Sajan Ki Galiyan Chhod Chale"	Shyam Sunder		
Bazaar	"Basalo Apni Nighahon Men Pyar"	Shyam Sunder		
Bazaar	"Aye Dil Unko Yaad Na Karna"	Shyam Sunder		
Bazaar	"Zara Sunlo Hum Apne Pyar"	Shyam Sunder		Rajkumari
Bazaar	"Aye Mohabbat Unse Milne"	Shyam Sunder		Mohammed Rafi
Bazaar	"Apni Nasar Se Door Ham"	Shyam Sunder		Mohammed Rafi
Badi Bahen	"Chale Jana Nehin Nain Milake"	Husnlal Bhagatram		
Badi Bahen	"Jo Dil Men Ghushi Ban Aaye"	Husnlal Bhagatram		
Badi Bahen	"Chup Chup Khade"	Husnlal Bhagatram	Premlata	
Bansuria	"Dil Tod Ke Janewale"	Husnlal Bhagatram		
Bansuria	"Jo Karke Gaye Barbaad Hamen"	Husnlal Bhagatram		
Bansuria	"Yeh Duniya Kehti Hai Koi Faryaad Na Kare"	Husnlal Bhagatram		
Bansuria	"Chahe Chori Chori Aao Chahe Chup Chup"	Husnlal Bhagatram		
Bholi	"Dil Todne Wale Kya Tune Kiya Hai Barbaad"	Husnlal Bhagatram		
Bholi	"Itna Bhi Beshav Ko Na Aasmaan Sataye"	Husnlal Bhagatram		
Char Din	"Haye Yeh Bholi Surat Wale"	Shyam Sunder		Rajkumari, Kalyani, Zohrabai Ambalewali, Shamshad Begum, Hamida Bano, Iqbal (Hamida's brother)
Chakori	"Kabhi Hans Hanske Nain Milaye"	Hansraj Behl		
Chakori	"Haye Chanda Gaye Pardes Chakori Jahan"	Hansraj Behl		
Chakori	"Too Humse Juda Hai Par Tere Liye Phir Bhi"	Hansraj Behl		
Chandni Raat	"Haye Chhore Ki Jaat"	Naushad		G.M. Durrani
Chandni Raat	"Haye Chhore Ki Jaat"	Naushad		Sadat Khan
Dil Ki Basti	"Aag Lage Jag Saara Dekhe"	Ghulam Mohammad		
Dil Ki Basti	"Unse Hum Kuch Kehte Kehte Reh Gaye"	Ghulam Mohammad		
Dulari	"Ankhon Men Aaya Dil Men Sama Ja"	Naushad		
Dulari	"Taqdeer Jaga Kar Aayi Hoon"	Naushad		
Dulari	"Aye Dil Tujche Kasam Hai"	Naushad		
Dulari	"Do Din Ki Bahar Hai Pyar Kar"	Naushad		
Dulari	"Mohabbat Hamari Zamana Hamara"	Naushad		
Dulari	"Mil Mil Ke Gayenge"	Naushad		Mohammed Rafi
Dulari	"Raat Rangeeli Mast"	Naushad		Mohammed Rafi
Ek Thi Lodki	"Ghir Ghir Ke Aayi Badra Sajanwa"	Vinod		
Ek Thi Lodki	"Mere Dil Ke Tadapne Ka Tamasha Dekhnewale"	Vinod		
Ek Thi Lodki	"Ab Haal E Dil"	Vinod		Mohammed Rafi
Ek Thi Lodki	"Lambi Joru Badi Musebat"	Vinod		Mohammed Rafi
Ek Thi Lodki	"Ye Shokh Sitaren"	Vinod		Mohammed Rafi
Ek Thi Lodki	"Lara Lappa Lara Lappa"	Vinod		Mohammed Rafi, G.M. Durrani
Ek Thi Lodki	"Hum Chale Door"	Vinod		Mohammed Rafi, Satish Batra
Girls School	"Kuchh Sharmate Hue Aur Kuch"	Anil Biswas		
Girls School	"Tum Hi Kaho Mera Man Kyon Rahe Udas"	Anil Biswas		
Girls School	"Baar Baar Tum Soch"	Anil Biswas		Shankar Dasgupta
Jal Tarang	"Lut Gayi Umeedon Ki Duniya"	Husnlal Bhagatram		
Jal Tarang	"Zara Tumne Dekha To Pyar"	Husnlal Bhagatram		Mohammed Rafi
Jal Tarang	"Haye Taqdeer Meri Banke Bigadti Kyon"	Husnlal Bhagatram		
Jeet	"Mast Pavan Hai Chanchal Dhaara"	Anil Biswas		
Jeet	"Hansle Gaa Le O Chand Mere"	Anil Biswas		
Kinara	"Janewale Yeh Jawani Chaar Din Ki"	M. Acharya		
Laadli	"Aath Roz Ki Chutti"	Anil Biswas		
Laadli	"Tumhare Bulane Ko Jee Chahata Hai"	Anil Biswas		
Laadli	"Kaise Keh Doon Bajariya Ke Beech"	Anil Biswas		
Laadli	"Zindagi Ki Roshni To Koh Gayi"	Anil Biswas		
Laadli	"Gharibon Ka Hissa Gharibon Men"	Anil Biswas		
Laadli	"Jai Jai Prem Devta"	Anil Biswas		Meena Kapoor
Laadli	"Agre Ko Ghaghro Mangwadei"	Anil Biswas		Ashalata
Lahore	"Baharen Phir Bhie Aayengi"	Shyam Sunder		
Lahore	"Sunlo Sajan Meri Baat Dil Ki Baat"	Shyam Sunder		
Lahore	"Bedard Zamane Kya Teri Mehfil Men"	Shyam Sunder		
Lahore	"Toote Hue Armano Ki Ek Dunia"	Shyam Sunder		
Lahore	"Us Dil Ki Kismat Kya Kehiye"	Shyam Sunder		
Lahore	"Umeed Ke Rangeen Jhoole Men Ek Aas"	Shyam Sunder		
Lahore	"Duniya Hamare Pyar Ki Yunhi"	Shyam Sunder		Karan Dewan
Maa Ka Pyaar	"Murakh Man Kahe Hot Adhir"	Pandit Gobindram		
Maa Ka Pyaar	"Soja Mere Nanhe Nindiya Tohe Aayi"	Pandit Gobindram		
Maa Ka Pyaar	"Tune Jahan Bana Kar Ehsaan Kya Kiya"	Pandit Gobindram		
Mahal	"Mushkil Hai Bohot Mushkil"	Khemchand Prakash	Nakshab	
Mahal	"Aayega Aayega Aanewala Aayega"	Khemchand Prakash	Nakshab	
Mahal	"Dil Ne Phir Yaad Kiya Bewafa"	Khemchand Prakash	Nakshab	
Namoona	"Bhagwan Tune Kyon"	C. Ramchandra		
Namoona	"Aaj Sambhal Ke Aana Ho Lala"	C. Ramchandra		
Namoona	"Mhari Gali Men Aave Jo"	C. Ramchandra		
Namoona	"Zulm Tumhare Seh Na Sake"	C. Ramchandra		
Namoona	"Tadpake Mujhe Ab Chodd"	C. Ramchandra		Mohammed Rafi
Narsinh Avtaar	"Bhaj Re Madhur Madhur Naam"	Vasant Desai		
Narsinh Avtaar	"Charan Tumhare Phool Hamarem"	Vasant Desai		
Narsinh Avtaar	"Hari Ko Bisaro Na Bisrayenge"	Vasant Desai		
Narsinh Avtaar	"Jagmag Taare Jhalke Jhalke Andheri"	Vasant Desai		
Nayi Taalim	"Aa Gayi Bahaar Aa Gayi"	Vasant Desai		
Nazare	"Ek Thes Lagi"	Bulo C. Ranii		
Nazare	"Kya Soch Ke Banayi"	Bulo C. Ranii		Mohammed Rafi
Nazare	"Tadpake Mujhe Chhod Diya"	Bulo C. Ranii		
Paras	"Aaj Meri Duniya Men Din Hai Bahar Ke"	Ghulam Mohammad	Shakeel Badayuni	
Paras	"Dil Ka Sahara Toot Na Jae"	Ghulam Mohammad	Shakeel Badayuni	
Paras	"Is Dard Ki Maari Duniya Men"	Ghulam Mohammad	Shakeel Badayuni	
Paras	"Dil Leke Chhupnewale"	Ghulam Mohammad	Shakeel Badayuni	
Pyar Ki Raat	"Chahe Woh Hamen Aisi Kismat Hai Kahan"	N. A. Jolagonkar		
Pyar Ki Raat	"Woh Nazar Mili Hansi Zindagi"	N. A. Jolagonkar		
Pyar Ki Raat	"Ek Baar Chale Aao Phir Chahe Na Aana"	N. A. Jolagonkar		
Patanga	"Dil Se Bhulado Tum Hamen"	C. Ramchandra		
Patanga	"Kabhi Khamosh Ho Jana Kabhi Faryaad"	C. Ramchandra		
Patanga	"O Janewale Tune Armanon Ki Duniya"	C. Ramchandra		
Patanga	"Pyar Ke Jahan Ki Nirali"	C. Ramchandra		Shamshad Begum
Raat Ki Rani	"Dil Todne Wale Aa"	Hansraj Behl		
Raat Ki Rani	"Sun To Lo Mera Afsana"	Hansraj Behl		Mohammed Rafi
Raat Ki Rani	"Us Raat Ke Pyare Chand"	Hansraj Behl		Mohammed Rafi
Roshani	"Mere Paas Mere Bhole Sajan"	C. Ramchandra		
Rakhi	"Kahe Dheere Chali Re Ghadi"	Husnlal Bhagatram		
Rakhi	"O Rooth Janewale Mera Kasoor Kya Hai"	Husnlal Bhagatram		
Rakhi	"Dil Kisi Ne Cheen Liya Pehli Mulaqat Men"	Husnlal Bhagatram		
Sant Janabai	"Gope Nandlala Goonthe Sab Vanmala"	Sudhir Phadke		
Sanwariya	"Jaani Re Hum Jaani Re"	C. Ramchandra		Geeta Dutt
Sawan Bhadon	"Sau Sau Gham Ne Ghere"	Husnlal Bhagatram		
Sawan Bhadon	"Teri Is Do Rangi Duniya Men"	Husnlal Bhagatram		
Sawan Bhadon	"Teri Ankhiyan Sajan Chor Chor"	Husnlal Bhagatram		
Sawan Bhadon	"Tum Bin Raja Nehin Man Ka Chain"	Husnlal Bhagatram		
Sawan Bhadon	"Kaleja Thaam Lo"	Husnlal Bhagatram		Zohrabai Ambalawali
Sawan Bhadon	"Yeh Raah E Mohabbat"	Husnlal Bhagatram		S.D. Batish
Sipahiya	"Dard Jaga Ke Tes Laga Ke"	C. Ramchandra		
Sipahiya	"Hansi Hansi Na Rahi Aur Khushi Na Khushi"	C. Ramchandra		
Sipahiya	"Aaram Ke The Saathi Kya Kya Jab Waqt Para To"	C. Ramchandra		
Sipahiya	"Chalo Ghunghat Men Guiyaan"	C. Ramchandra		Geeta Dutt
Sipahiya	"Laga Hai Kuchh Nishana"	C. Ramchandra		C. Ramchandra
Sipahiya	"Aye Ankh Ab Na Rona"	C. Ramchandra		C. Ramchandra
Shair	"Too Door Hai Ankhon Se Mere Dil Ko Yeh Gham"	Ghulam Mohammad		
Shair	"Mohabbat Pe Bahaar Aati Jahan Gulzar Ho Jata"	Ghulam Mohammad		
Shair	"Do Bichhare Hue Dil Aapas Men"	Ghulam Mohammad		G.M. Durrani
Shair	"Ye Duniya Hai Jahan Dil Ka Lagan"	Ghulam Mohammad		Mukesh
Uddhar	"Aaj Zindagi Ke Bandh Dwar Khul Gaye"	Vasant Desai		
Uddhar	"Kaha Ram He Ram Phir Shrimukh"	Vasant Desai		
Uddhar	"O Kabeera Hinduan Ki Hinduaai Dekho"	Vasant Desai		
Uddhar	"Patjhad Ke Din Beet Gaye"	Vasant Desai		
Uddhar	"Raat Jaa Rahi Neend Aa Rahi Hai"	Vasant Desai		
Uddhar	"Rangeen Gagan Peeche Choota"	Vasant Desai		
Usha Kiran	"Lehron Pe Kabhi Nachoon Kirnon Se Kabhi"	Saraswati Devi		
Zevaraat	"Shikwa Na Karenge Na Shikayat"	Hansraj Behl		
Zevaraat	"Ek Hi Tha Jagat Men Sahara"	Hansraj Behl		
Zevaraat	"Sajan Ki Or Leke"	Hansraj Behl		Mohammed Rafi
Zevaraat	"Jaa Teri Muqaddar Men Hansi Hai Na Khushi"	Hansraj Behl		
Zevaraat	"Chale Aao Jee Mujhe Tumse Mohabbat Hai"	Hansraj Behl		

=== 1950s ===
==== 1951 ====
Film	Song	Composer(s)	Writer(s)	Co-artist(s)
Awaara	"Ghar Aaya Mera Pardesi"	Shankar Jaikishan	Shailendra	solo
Awaara	"Dam Bhar Jo Udhar Munh Phere"	Shankar Jaikishan	Shailendra	Mukesh
Awaara	"Tere Bina Aag Yeh Chandni"	Shankar Jaikishan	Shailendra	Manna Dey
Awaara	"Ek Bewafa Se Pyar Kiya"	Shankar Jaikishan	Hasrat Jaipuri	solo
Awaara	"Ab Raat Guzarne Wali Hai"	Shankar Jaikishan	Hasrat Jaipuri	solo
Awaara	"Jab Se Balam Ghar Aaye"	Shankar Jaikishan	Hasrat Jaipuri	solo

==== 1952 ====
Film	Song	Composer(s)	Writer(s)	Co-artist(s)
Daag	"Kahe Ko Der Lagayi Re"	Shankar–Jaikishan		
Daag	"Dekho Aaya Ye Kaisa"	Shankar–Jaikishan		
Daag	"Lage Jabse Nain"	Shankar–Jaikishan		
Daag	"Preet Yeh Kaisi"	Shankar–Jaikishan		
Daag	"Aye Mere Dil Kahin Aur Chal"	Shankar–Jaikishan		
Shin Shinaki Boobla Boo	"Takka Lai Kali Dai"	C. Ramchandra	Pyarelal Santoshi	
Shin Shinaki Boobla Boo	"Arre Baba Yeh Hansi Baba Yeh Khushi Baba"	C. Ramchandra	Pyarelal Santoshi	
Shin Shinaki Boobla Boo	"Kaise Hain Mizaj Kahiye"	C. Ramchandra	Pyarelal Santoshi	
Shin Shinaki Boobla Boo	"Saain Re Ghar Ghar Mein Ek Chor"	C. Ramchandra	Pyarelal Santoshi	
Shin Shinaki Boobla Boo	"Ek Baar Jo Parde Se Phir Chham Se Tera Aana Ho"	C. Ramchandra	Pyarelal Santoshi	Kushiro Kumar
Shin Shinaki Boobla Boo	"Tum Kya Jaano Tumhari Yaad Mein Hum Kitna Roye"	C. Ramchandra	Pyarelal Santoshi	
Shin Shinaki Boobla Boo	"Shin Shinaki Boobla Boo"	C. Ramchandra	Pyarelal Santoshi	C. Ramchandra
Diwana	"Mere Chand Mere Lal"	Naushad	Shakeel Badayuni	Suraiya
Diwana	"Teer Khate Jayenge"	Naushad	Shakeel Badayuni	

==== 1953 ====
Film	Song	Composer(s)	Writer(s)	Co-artist(s)
Anarkali	"Aaja Ab To Aaja"	C. Ramchandra, Vasant Prakash		
Anarkali	"Dua Kar Gham-e-Dil"	C. Ramchandra, Vasant Prakash		
Anarkali	"Mujhse Mat Poochh"	C. Ramchandra, Vasant Prakash		
Anarkali	"Mohabbat Aisi Dhadkan Hai"	C. Ramchandra, Vasant Prakash		
Anarkali	"Mohabbat Mein Aise Kadam"	C. Ramchandra, Vasant Prakash		
Anarkali	"Yeh Zindagi Usi Ki Hai" (1)	C. Ramchandra, Vasant Prakash		
Anarkali	"Yeh Zindagi Usi Ki Hai" (2)	C. Ramchandra, Vasant Prakash		
Anarkali	"O Aasmanwale"	C. Ramchandra, Vasant Prakash		
Anarkali	"Jaag Dard-e-Ishq Jaag, Dil Ko Bekarar Kar Chhedke Aansuon Ka Raag"	C. Ramchandra, Vasant Prakash		Hemant Kumar
Aah	"Jane Na Nazar"	Shankar–Jaikishan	Hasrat Jaipuri	Mukesh
Aah	"Aaja Re Ab Mera Dil"	Shankar–Jaikishan	Hasrat Jaipuri	Mukesh
Aah	"Jo Main Jaanti"	Shankar–Jaikishan	Shailendra	Mukesh
Aah	"Jhanan Jhanan Jhanan"	Shankar–Jaikishan	Shailendra	
Aah	"Yeh Shaam Ki Tanhaiyan"	Shankar–Jaikishan	Shailendra	
Aah	"Sunte The Naam"	Shankar–Jaikishan	Shailendra	
Aah	"Raja Ki Aayegi Baaraat"	Shankar–Jaikishan	Shailendra	
Ladki	"Sajna Aaja Daras Dikha Ja"	R. Sudarsanam–Dhaniram	Rajendra Krishan	
Ladki	"Tod Ke Duniya Ki Deewar"	R. Sudarsanam–Dhaniram	Rajendra Krishan	
Ladki	"Mann Mor Machave Shor"	R. Sudarsanam–Dhaniram	Rajendra Krishan	Geeta Dutt
Ladki	"Mere Watan Se Achchha"	R. Sudarsanam–Dhaniram	Rajendra Krishan	
Do Bigha Zamin	"Aaja Ri Aa, Nindiya Tu Aa"	Salil Chowdhury	Shailendra	
Do Bigha Zamin	"Dharti Kahe Pukarke, Beej Bichha Le Pyar Ke"	Salil Chowdhury	Shailendra	Manna Dey
Do Bigha Zamin	"Hariyala Sawan Dhol Bajata Aaya"	Salil Chowdhury	Shailendra	Manna Dey

==== 1954 ====
Film	Song	Composer(s)	Writer(s)	Co-artist(s)
Nagin	"Man Dole Mera Tan Dole"	Hemant Kumar		
Nagin	"Sun Rasiya Man Bhasiya"	Hemant Kumar		
Nagin	"Sun Ri Sakhi"	Hemant Kumar		
Nagin	"Mera Dil Ye Pukare Aaja"	Hemant Kumar		
Nagin	"Jadugar Saiyan"	Hemant Kumar		
Nagin	"Ari Chhod De Patang"	Hemant Kumar	Hemant Kumar	
Nagin	"Mera Badli Mein Chhup Gaya Chand"	Hemant Kumar		
Nagin	"Teri Yaad Mein Jalkar Dekh Liya"	Hemant Kumar		
Nagin	"Oonchi Oonchi Duniya Ki Deewarein"	Hemant Kumar		
Mayurpankh	"Tandana Tandana Tandana"	Shailendra		Asha Bhosle, Usha Mangeshkar
Amar	"Na Shikwa Hai Koi Na Koi Gila Hai"			Shakeel Badayuni

==== 1955 ====
Film	Song	Composer(s)	Writer(s)	Co-artist(s)
Azaad	"Na Bole, Na Bole"	C. Ramchandra	Rajendra Krishna	
Azaad	"Kitni Jawan Hai Raat"	C. Ramchandra	Rajendra Krishna	
Azaad	"Dekho Ji Bahaar Aayi"	C. Ramchandra	Rajendra Krishna	
Azaad	"Ja Ri, O Kari Badariya"	C. Ramchandra	Rajendra Krishna	
Azaad	"Peeke Daras Ko Taras"	C. Ramchandra	Rajendra Krishna	
Azaad	"Kitna Haseen Hai Mausam, Kitna Haseen Safar Hai"	C. Ramchandra	Rajendra Krishna	C. Ramchandra
Azaad	"Aplam Chaplam, Chap Laiteri Duniya Ko Chhod"	C. Ramchandra	Rajendra Krishna	Usha Mangeshkar
Azaad	"Baliye O Baliye, Chal Chhaliye"	C. Ramchandra	Rajendra Krishna	Usha Mangeshkar
Devdas	"Jise Tu Kabool Karle"	S. D. Burman	Sahir Ludhianvi	
Devdas	"Ab Aage Teri Marzi"	S. D. Burman	Sahir Ludhianvi	
Devdas	"O Aane Wale Ruk Ja"	S. D. Burman	Sahir Ludhianvi	
Shree 420	"Pyar Hua Iqrar Hua"	Shankar–Jaikishan	Shailendra	
Shree 420	"Ramaiya Vastavaiya"	Shankar–Jaikishan	Shailendra	Mohammed Rafi, Mukesh
Shree 420	"Ichak Dana Beechak Dana"	Shankar–Jaikishan	Hasrat Jaipuri	Mukesh
Shree 420	"O Janewale"	Shankar–Jaikishan	Hasrat Jaipuri	
Shree 420	"Sham Gayi Raat Aayi"	Shankar–Jaikishan	Hasrat Jaipuri	
Jhanak Jhanak Payal Baaje	"Jhanak Jhanak Payal Baaje"	Vasant Desai	Hasrat Jaipuri	Hemant Kumar
Jhanak Jhanak Payal Baaje	"Jo Tum Todo Piya"	Vasant Desai	Hasrat Jaipuri	
Jhanak Jhanak Payal Baaje	"Saiyyan Jao"	Vasant Desai	Hasrat Jaipuri	
Jhanak Jhanak Payal Baaje	"Suno Suno Suno Ji"	Vasant Desai	Hasrat Jaipuri	
Jhanak Jhanak Payal Baaje	"Kaisi Yeh Mohabbat"	Vasant Desai	Hasrat Jaipuri	
Jhanak Jhanak Payal Baaje	"Murli Manohar"	Vasant Desai	Hasrat Jaipuri	Manna Dey
Jhanak Jhanak Payal Baaje	"Mere Ae Dil Bata"	Vasant Desai	Hasrat Jaipuri	Manna Dey
Jhanak Jhanak Payal Baaje	"Nain So Nain Naahi Milao"	Vasant Desai	Hasrat Jaipuri	Hemant Kumar
Jhanak Jhanak Payal Baaje	"Raag Malika"	Vasant Desai	Hasrat Jaipuri	Manna Dey
Jhanak Jhanak Payal Baaje	"Rut Basant"	Vasant Desai	Hasrat Jaipuri	
Uran Khatola	"Na Ro Ae Dil"	Naushad		
Uran Khatola	"Haal-e-Dil Main Kya Kahoon"	Naushad		
Uran Khatola	"Ghar Aaya Mehman Koi"	Naushad		
Uran Khatola	"Mera Salam Le Ja"	Naushad		
Uran Khatola	"Hamare Dil Se Na Jana"	Naushad		
Uran Khatola	"More Saiyan Ji Utrenge Paar"	Naushad		
Uran Khatola	"Dooba Tara Ummeedon"	Naushad		
Uran Khatola	"Sitaron Ki Mehfil"	Naushad		
Bandish	"Raat Hai Suhani"	Hemant Kumar		solo
Bandish	"Tumhari Yaad Mein"	Hemant Kumar		solo
Bandish	"Jhoomti Jawani Hai"	Hemant Kumar		solo

==== 1956 ====
Film	Song	Composer(s)	Writer(s)	Co-artist(s)
New Delhi	"Koi Mere Sapnon Mein Aaya"	Shankar–Jaikishan	Hasrat Jaipuri, Shailendra (lyricist)	
New Delhi	"Tum Sang Preet Lagai Rasiya"	Shankar–Jaikishan	Hasrat Jaipuri, Shailendra (lyricist)	
New Delhi	"Zindagi Bahar Hai"	Shankar–Jaikishan	Hasrat Jaipuri, Shailendra (lyricist)	
New Delhi	"Bari Barse Khatan Gayan"	Shankar–Jaikishan	Hasrat Jaipuri, Shailendra (lyricist)	
New Delhi	"Murli Bairan Bhai"	Shankar–Jaikishan	Hasrat Jaipuri, Shailendra (lyricist)	
Chori Chori	Rasik Balma (Based on raag Shudh Kalyan)	Shankar–Jaikishan	Hasrat Jaipuri	
Chori Chori	"Us Par Sajan"	Shankar–Jaikishan	Hasrat Jaipuri	
Chori Chori	"Aaja Sanam Madhur Chandni Mein Hum"	Shankar–Jaikishan	Hasrat Jaipuri	Manna Dey
Chori Chori	"Pancchi Banoon Udti Phiroon"	Shankar–Jaikishan	Hasrat Jaipuri	Manna Dey
Chori Chori	"Jahan Main Jaati Hoon"	Shankar–Jaikishan	Shailendra	Manna Dey
Chori Chori	"Yeh Raat Bheegi Bheegi"	Shankar–Jaikishan	Shailendra	Manna Dey
Chori Chori	"Manbhawan Ke Ghar"	Shankar–Jaikishan	Shailendra	Asha Bhosle
Chori Chori	"Sawa Lakh Ki Lottery"	Shankar–Jaikishan	Shailendra	Mohammed Rafi
Patrani	"Saat Samundar Paar"	Shankar–Jaikishan	Shailendra	
Patrani	"O Balam Tum Bedardi"	Shankar–Jaikishan	Shailendra	
Patrani	"Chandrama Kyon Jhoome"	Shankar–Jaikishan	Shailendra	
Patrani	"Dil Gaya Dard Raha Seene Mein"	Shankar–Jaikishan	Shailendra	
Patrani	"Are Koi Jao Ri Piya Ko Bulao Ri"	Shankar–Jaikishan	Shailendra	Meena Mangeshkar, Usha Mangeshkar
Patrani	"Raja Pyare Mat Karo Pyar Ka Mol"	Shankar–Jaikishan	Shailendra	Usha Mangeshkar
Patrani	"Na Jane Tum Kaun Meri Ankhon Men"	Shankar–Jaikishan	Shailendra	
Kismet Ka Khel	"Arz Hai Aap Se"	Shankar–Jaikishan	Shailendra (lyricist), Hasrat Jaipuri	
Kismet Ka Khel	"Kismat Ka Khel Hai Janaabe Aali"	Shankar–Jaikishan	Shailendra (lyricist), Hasrat Jaipuri	
Kismet Ka Khel	"Na Bure Na Bhale Hum Garib Gham Ke Pale"	Shankar–Jaikishan	Shailendra (lyricist), Hasrat Jaipuri	
Kismet Ka Khel	"Tu Maane Ya Na Maane Balam Anjaane"	Shankar–Jaikishan	Shailendra (lyricist), Hasrat Jaipuri	
Kismet Ka Khel	"Ae Zamin Ae Aasman Itna Bata"	Shankar–Jaikishan	Shailendra (lyricist), Hasrat Jaipuri	
Kismet Ka Khel	"Keh Do Ji Keh Do"	Shankar–Jaikishan	Shailendra (lyricist), Hasrat Jaipuri	Manna Dey
Subah Ka Tara	"Chamka Chamka Subah Ka Tara"			Talat Mahmood
Devta	"Do Nainon Ka Bana"	C. Ramchandra	Rajendra Krishan	
Devta	"Kaise Aaoon Jamuna Ke Teer"	C. Ramchandra	Rajendra Krishan	
Devta	"Phoolon Ke Mele"	C. Ramchandra	Rajendra Krishan	
Devta	"Suna Hai Mere Dil Ka"	C. Ramchandra	Rajendra Krishan	
Devta	"Yeh Chand Kal Jo"	C. Ramchandra	Rajendra Krishan	
Devta	"Kisi Se Pyaar Hai Humko"	C. Ramchandra	Rajendra Krishan	Talat Mahmood
Devta	"Ae Chaand Kal Jo Aana Unko"	C. Ramchandra	Rajendra Krishan	solo
Bandhan	"Brindavan Ki Kunj Gali"	Hemant Kumar	Rajendra Krisha	solo
Bandhan	"Mere Devta Mujhko Dena Sahara"	Hemant Kumar	Rajendra Krisha	solo

==== 1957 ====
Film	Song	Composer(s)	Writer(s)	Co-artist(s)
Kathputli	"Bakkad Bam Bam"	Shankar–Jaikishan	Shailendra (lyricist), Hasrat Jaipuri	
Kathputli	"Bol Ri Kath Putli"	Shankar–Jaikishan	Shailendra (lyricist), Hasrat Jaipuri	
Kathputli	"Bol Ri Kath Putli (sad version)"	Shankar–Jaikishan	Shailendra (lyricist), Hasrat Jaipuri	
Kathputli	"Mini Mini Chichi"	Shankar–Jaikishan	Shailendra (lyricist), Hasrat Jaipuri	Mukesh
Kathputli	"Haye Tu Hi Gaya Mohe Bhool Re"	Shankar–Jaikishan	Shailendra (lyricist), Hasrat Jaipuri	
Kathputli	"Itne Bade Jahan Mein Ae Dil"	Shankar–Jaikishan	Shailendra (lyricist), Hasrat Jaipuri	
Kathputli	"So Ja Re So Ja"	Shankar–Jaikishan	Shailendra (lyricist), Hasrat Jaipuri	
Aasha	"Zaraa Ruk Ruk Ke, Main To Dwaar Chali Sakhi"	C. Ramchandra	Rajendra Krishan	
Aasha	"Chal Chal Re Kanhai"	C. Ramchandra	Rajendra Krishan	
Aasha	"Tu Na Aaya Aur Hone Lagi Sham Re"	C. Ramchandra	Rajendra Krishan	
Aasha	"Tumko Salaam Hain"	C. Ramchandra	Rajendra Krishan	Mohammed Rafi
Mother India	"Nagari Nagari Dware Dware"	Naushad	Shakeel Badayuni	
Mother India	"Duniya Mein Hum Aaye Hain (Raga Shivaranjani)"	Naushad	Shakeel Badayuni	Usha Mangeshkar, Meena Khadikar
Mother India	"Matwala Jiya Dole Piya (Raga Sarang)"	Naushad	Shakeel Badayuni	Mohammed Rafi
Mother India	"Ghunghat Nahin Kholoongi Saiyan"	Naushad	Shakeel Badayuni	
Mother India	"O Mere Lal Aaja (Raga Bhairavi)"	Naushad	Shakeel Badayuni	
Mother India	"O Janewalo Jao Na"	Naushad	Shakeel Badayuni	

==== 1958 ====
Film	Song	Composer(s)	Writer(s)	Co-artist(s)
Sitaron Se Aage	"Mehfil Mein Aaye Woh"	S. D. Burman	Majrooh Sultanpuri	
Sitaron Se Aage	"Pag Thumak Chalat"	S. D. Burman	Majrooh Sultanpuri	
Sitaron Se Aage	"Aa Khilte Hai Gul"	S. D. Burman	Majrooh Sultanpuri	
Sadhna	"Aurat Ne Janam Diya Mardon Ko"	Datta Naik	Sahir Ludhianvi	
Sadhna	"Kahoji Tum Kya Kya Kharidoge"	Datta Naik	Sahir Ludhianvi	
Sadhna	"Aise Vaise Thikane Pe Jana Bura Hai"	Datta Naik	Sahir Ludhianvi	
Madhumati	"Dil Tadap Tadap Ke Kah Raha"	Salil Chowdhury	Shailendra	Mukesh
Madhumati	"Aaja Re Pardesi"	Salil Chowdhury	Shailendra	
Madhumati	"Chadh Gayo Papi Bichhua"	Salil Chowdhury	Shailendra	Manna Dey
Madhumati	"Ghadi Ghadi Mera Dil Dhadke"	Salil Chowdhury	Shailendra	
Madhumati	"Zulmi Sang Ankh Ladi Re"	Salil Chowdhury	Shailendra	
Amardeep	"Mere Man Ka Baawra Panchhi"	C. Ramchandra		
Amardeep	"Dil Ki Duniya Basaake Sanwariya"	C. Ramchandra		
Adalat	"Unko Yeh Shikayat Hai"	Madan Mohan	Rajendra Krishan	
Adalat	"Jaana Tha Humse Door"	Madan Mohan	Rajendra Krishan	
Adalat	"Jaa Jaa Re Jaa Saajna" (slow)	Madan Mohan	Rajendra Krishan	
Adalat	"Yu Hasrato Ke Dag"	Madan Mohan	Rajendra Krishan	

==== 1959 ====
Film	Song	Composer(s)	Writer(s)	Co-artist(s)
Kanhaiya	"O More Saanwre Salone Piya, Tose Milne Ko Tarse Jiya"	Shankar Jaikishan		
Kanhaiya	"Ni Baliye Rut Hai Bahaar Ki, Kuchh Mat Puchho Kaise Bitin"	Shankar Jaikishan		Mukesh
Kanhaiya	"O Kanhayyaa Aaj Aanaa Kvaab Men"	Shankar Jaikishan		
Kanhaiya	"Saawan Aawan Keh Gaye Dil Mein Sama Ke Milne Na Aaye"	Shankar Jaikishan		
Kanhaiya	"Kahaan Hai Kahaan Hai Kanhaiya, Samjhe Na Pyar Mera"	Shankar Jaikishan		

=== 1960s ===
==== 1960 ====
Film	Song	Composer(s)	Writer(s)	Co-artist(s)
Dil Apna Aur Preet Parai	"Ajeeb Dastaan Hai Yeh"	Shankar–Jaikishan	Shailendra	solo
Dil Apna Aur Preet Parai	"Andaz Mera Mastana"	Shankar–Jaikishan	Shailendra	solo
Dil Apna Aur Preet Parai	"Dil Apna Aur Preet Parai"	Shankar–Jaikishan	Shailendra	solo
Dil Apna Aur Preet Parai	"Mera Dil Ab Tera Ho Sajna"	Shankar–Jaikishan	Shailendra	solo
Dil Apna Aur Preet Parai	"Sheesha-e-Dil"	Shankar–Jaikishan	Hasrat Jaipuri	solo
Parakh	"O Sajan, Barkha Bahar Aayi"	Salil Chowdhury	Shailendra	solo
Parakh	"Mila Hai Kisi Ka Jhumka"	Salil Chowdhury	Shailendra	solo
Parakh	"Yeh Bansi Kyun Gaaye"	Salil Chowdhury	Shailendra	solo
Parakh	"Mere Man Ke Diye"	Salil Chowdhury	Shailendra	solo
Mughal-e-Azam	"Mohe Panghat Pe"	Naushad	Shakeel Badayuni	solo
Mughal-e-Azam	"Pyar Kiya To Darna Kya"	Naushad	Shakeel Badayuni	solo
Mughal-e-Azam	"Mohabbat Ki Jhooti"	Naushad	Shakeel Badayuni	solo
Mughal-e-Azam	"Humen Kash Tumse Mohabbat"	Naushad	Shakeel Badayuni	solo
Mughal-e-Azam	"Bekas Pe Karam Keejeye"	Naushad	Shakeel Badayuni	solo
Mughal-e-Azam	"Teri Mehfil Mein"	Naushad	Shakeel Badayuni	Shamshad Begum
Mughal-e-Azam	"Ye Dil Ki Lagi"	Naushad	Shakeel Badayuni	solo
Mughal-e-Azam	"Ae Ishq Yeh Sab Duniyawale"	Naushad	Shakeel Badayuni	solo
Mughal-e-Azam	"Khuda Nigehbaan"	Naushad	Shakeel Badayuni	solo

==== 1961 ====
Film	Song	Composer(s)	Writer(s)	Co-artist(s)
Nazrana	"Mele Hain Chiragon Ki Diwali"	Ravi	Rajendra Krishan	
Nazrana	"Bikhra Ke Zulfen Chaman Mein"	Ravi	Rajendra Krishan	Mukesh
Gunga Jumna	"Dhoondo Dhoondo Re Saajna"	Naushad	Shakeel Badayuni	
Gunga Jumna	"Dagabaaz, Tori Batiyan Na Maanun Re"	Naushad	Shakeel Badayuni	
Gunga Jumna	"Do Hanson Ka Joda Bichhad Gayo Re"	Naushad	Shakeel Badayuni	
Gunga Jumna	"Jhanan Ghoongar Baaje"	Naushad	Shakeel Badayuni	
Hum Dono	"Allah Tero Nam"	Jaidev	Sahir Ludhianvi	
Hum Dono	"Prabhu Tero Naam"	Jaidev	Sahir Ludhianvi	

==== 1962 ====
Film	Song	Composer(s)	Writer(s)	Co-artist(s)
Anpadh	"Aap Ki Nazron Ne Samjha"	Madan Mohan Kohli	Raja Mehdi Ali Khan	
Anpadh	"Hai Isi Mein Pyar Ki Aabroo"	Madan Mohan Kohli	Raja Mehdi Ali Khan	
Anpadh	"Rang Birangi Rakhi Leke Aayi"	Madan Mohan Kohli	Raja Mehdi Ali Khan	
Anpadh	"Woh Dekho, Jala Ghar Kisi Ka"	Madan Mohan Kohli	Raja Mehdi Ali Khan	
Anpadh	"Jiya Le Gayo Ji Mora"	Madan Mohan Kohli	Raja Mehdi Ali Khan	
Asli-Naqli	"Tujhe Jeevan Ki Dor Se"	Shankar Jaikishan	Hasrat Jaipuri	Mohammad Rafi
Asli-Naqli	"Lakh Chhupao Chhup Na Sakega"	Shankar Jaikishan	Hasrat Jaipuri	
Asli-Naqli	"Tera Mera Pyar Amar"	Shankar Jaikishan	Hasrat Jaipuri	
Prem Patra	"Sawan Ki Raaton Mein Aisa"	Salil Chowdhury		Talat Mahmood
Prem Patra	"Yeh Mere Andhere Ujaale Na Hote"	Salil Chowdhury		Talat Mahmood
Prem Patra	"Ab Aur Na Kucch Bhi Yaad Raha"	Salil Chowdhury		
Prem Patra	"Do Ankhiyan Jhuki Jhuki Si"	Salil Chowdhury		Mukesh
Prem Patra	"Khush Ho Rahe The"	Salil Chowdhury		
Man-Mauji	"Main Toh Tum Sang Nain Milake"	Madan Mohan	Rajendra Krishan	
Man-Mauji	"Chanda Jaa"	Madan Mohan	Rajendra Krishan	
Man-Mauji	"Aaya Hai Kahan Se"	Madan Mohan	Rajendra Krishan	
Man-Mauji	"Ek Tha Abdul Rahman"	Madan Mohan	Rajendra Krishan	Kishore Kumar

==== 1963 ====
Film	Song	Composer(s)	Writer(s)	Co-artist(s)
Parasmani	"Wo Jab Yaad Aaye"	Laxmikant–Pyarelal		Mohammad Rafi
Taj Mahal	"Jo Vada Kiya Wo Nibhana Padega"	Roshan		Mohammad Rafi
Tere Ghar Ke Samne	"Dekho Rootha Na Karo"	S.D. Burman	Hasrat Jaipuri	Mohammad Rafi
Tere Ghar Ke Samne	"Tere Ghar Ke Samne"	S.D. Burman	Hasrat Jaipuri	Mohammad Rafi
Tere Ghar Ke Samne	Yeh Tanhai Hai Re Hai	S.D. Burman	Hasrat Jaipuri	
Mere Mehboob	"Tere Pyar Mein Dildar"	Naushad	Shakeel Badayuni	
Mere Mehboob	"Allah Bachaaye"	Naushad	Shakeel Badayuni	
Mere Mehboob	"Mere Mehboob Tujhe" (female)	Naushad	Shakeel Badayuni	
Mere Mehboob	"Mere Mehboob Mein Kya Nahin"	Naushad	Shakeel Badayuni	Asha Bhosle
Mere Mehboob	"Jaaneman Ek Nazar Dekh Le"	Naushad	Shakeel Badayuni	Asha Bhosle
Mere Mehboob	"Yaad Mein Teri"	Naushad	Shakeel Badayuni	Mohammed Rafi
Dil Ek Mandir	"Hum tere pyaar mein saara alam"	Shankar-Jaikishan	Hasrat Jaipuri	
Dil Ek Mandir	"Ruk Ja Raat"	Shankar-Jaikishan	Shailendra	

==== 1964 ====
Film	Song	Composer(s)	Writer(s)	Co-artist(s)
Rajkumar	"Aaja Aayi Bahaar"	Shankar Jaikishan	Shailendra	
Rajkumar	"Naach Re Man"	Shankar Jaikishan	Shailendra	Asha Bhosle
Sangam	"Har Dil Jo Pyaar Karega"		Shailendra	Mukesh, Mahendra Kapoor
Sangam	"O Mere Sanam"		Shailendra	Mukesh
Sangam	"Main Ka Karun Ram Mujhe Budhdha Milgaya"		Hasrat Jaipuri	
Woh Kaun Thi?	"Lag Ja Gale Ki Phir Ye Haseen Raat Ho Na Ho"	Madan Mohan	Raja Mehdi Ali Khan	
Woh Kaun Thi?	"Naina Barase Rimjhim Rimjhim"	Madan Mohan	Raja Mehdi Ali Khan	
Woh Kaun Thi?	"Jo Hamne Daastaan Apnee Sunaaee"	Madan Mohan	Raja Mehdi Ali Khan	
Woh Kaun Thi?	"Chhod Kar Tere Pyaar Kaa Daaman"	Madan Mohan	Raja Mehdi Ali Khan	Mahendra Kapoor

==== 1965 ====
Film	Song	Composer(s)	Writer(s)	Co-artist(s)
Arzoo	"Aji Rooth Kar Ab Kahan Jaiyega"	Shankar Jaikishan	Hasrat Jaipuri	
Arzoo	"Bedardi Balma Tujhko"	Shankar Jaikishan	Hasrat Jaipuri	
Bheegi Raat	"Dil Jo Na Kah Saka"	Roshan	Majrooh Sultanpuri	
Gumnaam	"Gumnaam Hai Koyi"	Shankar Singh Raghuwansi	Hasrat Jaipuri, Majrooh Sultanpuri	
Guide	"Aaj Phir Jeene Ki Tamanna"	Sachin Dev Burman	Shailendra	
Guide	"Piya Tose Naina Laage Re"	Sachin Dev Burman	Shailendra	
Guide	"Saiyaan Beimaan"	Sachin Dev Burman	Shailendra	
Guide	"Gaata Rahe Mera Dil"	Sachin Dev Burman	Shailendra	Kishore Kumar
Jab Jab Phool Khile	"Mein Jo Chali Hindustan Se"	Kalyanji–Anandji	Anand Bakshi	
Jab Jab Phool Khile	"Pardesiyon Se Na Ankhiyan Milana"	Kalyanji–Anandji	Anand Bakshi	
Jab Jab Phool Khile	"Ye Samaa Samaa Hai Pyar Ka"	Kalyanji–Anandji	Anand Bakshi	

==== 1966 ====
Film	Song	Composer(s)	Writer(s)	Co-artist(s)
Mera Saaya	"Tu Jahaan Jahaan Chalegaa Mera Saaya Saath Hoga"	Madan Mohan	Raja Mehdi Ali Khan	solo
Mera Saaya	"Nainon Mein Badra Chhaye"	Madan Mohan	Raja Mehdi Ali Khan	solo
Mera Saaya	"Nainonwali Ne Haye Mera Dil Loota"	Madan Mohan	Raja Mehdi Ali Khan	solo
Love in Tokyo	"Koi Matwala Aaya"	Shankar–Jaikishan	Shailendra	solo
Love in Tokyo	"Sayonara Sayonara"	Shankar–Jaikishan	Hasrat Jaipuri	solo
Love in Tokyo	"Mujhe Tum Mil Gaye"	Shankar–Jaikishan	Hasrat Jaipuri	solo
Love in Tokyo	"O Mere Shah-e-Khuba"	Shankar–Jaikishan	Hasrat Jaipuri	solo
Pyar Kiye Jaa	"Kisne Pukara Mujhe, Main Aa Gayi"	Laxmikant–Pyarelal	Rajendra Krishan	Mahendra Kapoor
Pyar Kiye Jaa	"Phool Ban Jaunga Shart Yeh Hai Magar"	Laxmikant–Pyarelal	Rajendra Krishan	Mahendra Kapoor
Pyar Kiye Jaa	"Dil Humne De Diya, Kyun Tumne Le Liya"	Laxmikant–Pyarelal	Rajendra Krishan	Kishore Kumar
Pyar Kiye Jaa	"Sunle Pyar Ke Dushman Duniya Dilwalon Ke Afsane, Chal Pade Jo Dhoon Mein To Phir Kab Rukte Hai Deewane"	Laxmikant–Pyarelal	Rajendra Krishan	Asha Bhosle, Kishore Kumar, Manna Dey

==== 1967 ====
Film	Song	Composer(s)	Writer(s)	Co-artist(s)
Milan	"Sawan Ka Mahina"	Laxmikant–Pyarelal	Anand Bakshi	Mukesh
Milan	"Hum Tum Yug Yug Se"	Laxmikant–Pyarelal	Anand Bakshi	Mukesh
Milan	"Bol Gori Bol Tera Kaun Piya" (revival)	Laxmikant–Pyarelal	Anand Bakshi	Mukesh
Milan	"Aaj Dil Pe Koi" (revival)	Laxmikant–Pyarelal	Anand Bakshi	
Milan	"Hum Tum Yug Yug Se" (revival)	Laxmikant–Pyarelal	Anand Bakshi	Mukesh
Milan	"Ye Geet Milan Ke"	Laxmikant–Pyarelal	Anand Bakshi	Mukesh
Milan	"Bol Gori Bol Tera Kaun Piya"	Laxmikant–Pyarelal	Anand Bakshi	Mukesh
Milan	"Aaj Dil Pe Koi Zor Chalta Nahin"	Laxmikant–Pyarelal	Anand Bakshi	
Milan	"Tohe Sanwariya"	Laxmikant–Pyarelal	Anand Bakshi	
Shagird	"Dil Wil Pyar Wyar"	Laxmikant–Pyarelal	Majrooh Sultanpuri	
Shagird	"Kanha Kanha Aan Padi"	Laxmikant–Pyarelal	Majrooh Sultanpuri	
Shagird	"Woh Hain Zara Khafa Khafa"	Laxmikant–Pyarelal	Majrooh Sultanpuri	Mohammed Rafi
Shagird	"Ruk Jaa Aye Hawa, Tham Jaa Aye Bahaar"	Laxmikant–Pyarelal	Majrooh Sultanpuri	
Raat Aur Din	"Na Chhedo Kal Ke Afsane"	Shankar Jaikishan	Shailendra	
Raat Aur Din	"Jeena Humko Raas Na Aaya"	Shankar Jaikishan	Shailendra	
Raat Aur Din	"Aawara Ae Mere Dil" (happy)	Shankar Jaikishan	Shailendra	
Raat Aur Din	"Aawara Ae Mere Dil" (sad)	Shankar Jaikishan	Shailendra	
Raat Aur Din	"Dil Ki Girah Khol Do"	Shankar Jaikishan	Shailendra	Manna Dey
Raat Aur Din	"Raat Aur Din Diya Jale"	Shankar Jaikishan	Hasrat Jaipuri	
Anita	"Hai Nazar Ka Ishara"	Laxmikant-Pyarelal	Anand Bakshi	Usha Mangeshkar
Anita	"Kareeb Aa Ye Nazar"	Laxmikant-Pyarelal	Raja Mehdi Ali Khan	
Anita	"Pichhwade Buddha Khansta"	Laxmikant-Pyarelal	Raja Mehdi Ali Khan	
Anita	"Samne Mere Sanwariya"	Laxmikant-Pyarelal	Raja Mehdi Ali Khan	

==== 1968 ====
Film	Song	Composer(s)	Writer(s)	Co-artist(s)
Saraswatichandra	"Phool Tumhei Bheja Hai Khat Mein"	Kalyanji–Anandji	Indeevar	Mukesh
Saraswatichandra	"Chandan Sa Bandan"	Kalyanji–Anandji	Indeevar	
Saraswatichandra	"Main Toh Bhool Chali"	Kalyanji–Anandji	Indeevar	

==== 1969 ====
Film	Song	Composer(s)	Writer(s)	Co-artist(s)
Intaqam	"Hum Tumhare Liye"	Laxmikant–Pyarelal	Rajinder Krishan	Mohammad Rafi
Intaqam	"Kaise Rahoon Chup"	Laxmikant–Pyarelal	Rajinder Krishan	
Intaqam	"Geet Tere Saaz Ka"	Laxmikant–Pyarelal	Rajinder Krishan	
Intaqam	"Aisa Koi Mehfil Soyi"	Laxmikant–Pyarelal	Rajinder Krishan	
Intaqam	"Aa Jaane Jaan"	Laxmikant–Pyarelal	Rajinder Krishan	
Do Raaste	"Bindiya Chamkegi"	Laxmikant–Pyarelal	Anand Bakshi	
Do Raaste	"Chup Gaye Sare Nazare (Dil Ne Dil Ko Pukara)"	Laxmikant–Pyarelal	Anand Bakshi	Mohammed Rafi
Do Raaste	"Apni Apni Biwi Pe"	Laxmikant–Pyarelal	Anand Bakshi	
Waris	"Dil Ki Lagi Ko Chhupaoon Kaise"	R D Burman	Rajendra Krishan	
Waris	"Lehra Ke Aya Hain Jhoka Bahar Ka"	R D Burman	Rajendra Krishan	Mohammed Rafi
Waris	"Kabhi Kabhi Aisa Bhi Hota Hain"	R D Burman	Rajendra Krishan	Mohammed Rafi

=== 1970s ===
==== 1970 ====
Film	Song	Composer(s)	Writer(s)	Co-artist(s)
Johny Mera Naam	"Mose Mora Shyam Rootha"	Kalyanji–Anandji	Indeevar	
Johny Mera Naam	"Babul Pyaare"	Kalyanji–Anandji	Indeevar	

==== 1971 ====
Film	Song	Composer(s)	Writer(s)	Co-artist(s)
Haathi Mere Saathi	"Dhak Dhak Kaise Chalti Hai Gaadi"	Laxmikant–Pyarelal	Anand Bakshi	Kishore Kumar
Haathi Mere Saathi	"Sun Jaa Aa Thandi Hawa"	Laxmikant–Pyarelal	Anand Bakshi	Kishore Kumar
Haathi Mere Saathi	"Dilbar Jaani Chali Hawa Mastaani"	Laxmikant–Pyarelal	Anand Bakshi	Kishore Kumar
Jwala	"Jagi Raat Bhari Yaad Me Balam"	Shankar–Jaikishan		
Jwala	"Aaha Le Gai O Jiya Le Gai, Chavi Sunder Salone Gopal Ki"	Shankar–Jaikishan		Asha Bhosle
Jwala	"Dekho Ji Aankho Me Dekho, Aankhein Hamari Sapne Tumhare"	Shankar–Jaikishan		
Jwala	"Hole Hole Ek Bhi Na Ghungru Bole"	Shankar–Jaikishan		Sudha Malhotra, Geeta Dutt
Jwala	"Aaja Re Aaja Mere Sajana Aa, Sapno Ki Palki"	Shankar–Jaikishan		Manna Dey
Jwala	"Mera Jwala Naam Jiya Jalana Kaam"	Shankar–Jaikishan		
Memsaab	"Suno Suno Ek Baat Kahu"	Sonik Om	Verma Malik	Mohammed Rafi
Memsaab	"Mujhe Dhund Le Aa Kar Saiya"	Sonik Om	Verma Malik	
Memsaab	"Jab Se Tere Mere Man Me"	Sonik Om	Verma Malik	
Sharmeelee	"Megha Chhaye Aadhi Raat"	S. D. Burman		

==== 1972 ====
Film	Song	Composer(s)	Writer(s)	Co-artist(s)
Shehzada	"Pariyon Ki Nagri Se Aaya"	Rahul Dev Burman	Rajendra Krishan	
Shehzada	"Rimjhim Rimjhim Dekho Baras Rahee Hai"	Rahul Dev Burman	Rajendra Krishan	Kishore Kumar
Shehzada	"Naa Jaeeyo, Naa Jaeeyo, Chhod Ke Naa"	Rahul Dev Burman	Rajendra Krishan	Kishore Kumar
Hari Darshan	"Apna Hari Hai Hazaar Hath Wala"	Kalyanji–Anandji		
Hari Darshan	"Jai Jai Narayan"	Kalyanji–Anandji		Mahendra Kapoor
Hari Darshan	"Marne Wala Hai Bhagwan"	Kalyanji–Anandji		
Hari Darshan	"Prabhu Ke Bharose"	Kalyanji–Anandji		
Parichay	"Beeti Na Bitai Raina"	Rahul Dev Burman		
Pakeezah	"Chalte Chalte"	Ghulam Mohammed	Kaifi Azmi	
Pakeezah	"Mausam Hai Aashiqana" (based on Yaman raga)	Ghulam Mohammed	Kamal Amrohi	
Pakeezah	"Inhi Logon Ne" (based on Yaman Kalyan raga)	Ghulam Mohammed	Majrooh Sultanpuri	
Pakeezah	"Thade Rahiyo" (based on Mand)	Ghulam Mohammed	Kamal Amrohi, Majrooh Sultanpuri	
Pakeezah	"Teer-e-Nazar" (based on Khamaj raga)	Ghulam Mohammed	Kaif Bhopali	
Pakeezah	"Chalo Dildaar Chalo"	Ghulam Mohammed	Kaif Bhopali	Mohammed Rafi
Dharkan	"Main Aaya Tere Dwaare"	Ravi		
Dharkan	"So Jaa Mere Laal So Jaa Madhur Suron Mein Nindiya Gaaye"	Ravi		
Yeh Gulistan Hamara	"Raina Soyi Soyi"	S. D. Burman		
Yeh Gulistan Hamara	"Kya Yeh Zindagi Hai"	S. D. Burman		
Yeh Gulistan Hamara	"O Tushima Ri Tushima"	S. D. Burman		
Yeh Gulistan Hamara	"Mera Naam Aao, Mere Paas Aao"	S. D. Burman		Danny Denzongpa
Yeh Gulistan Hamara	"Gori Gori Gaon Ki Gori Re, Kis Liye Bun Rahi Dori Re"	S. D. Burman		Kishore Kumar
Seeta Aur Geeta	"Koi Ladki Mujhe Kal Raat"	R. D. Burman	Anand Bakshi	Kishore Kumar
Seeta Aur Geeta	"Haan Ji Haan Maine Sharaab"	R. D. Burman	Anand Bakshi	solo
Raja Jani	"Aa Aaja Aaja"	Laxmikant–Pyarelal		solo
Raja Jani	"A B C D Chhodo"	Laxmikant–Pyarelal		solo
Raja Jani	"Duniya Ka Mela"	Laxmikant–Pyarelal		solo
Raja Jani	"Kitna Maza Aa Raha Hai"	Laxmikant–Pyarelal		solo
Raja Jani	"Mubarak Ho Tujhe Ae Dil"	Laxmikant–Pyarelal		solo

==== 1973 ====
Film	Song	Composer(s)	Writer(s)	Co-artist(s)
Jugnu	"Jaane Kya Pilaaye Tune"	S. D. Burman		
Jugnu	"Jab Baaghon Mein Jugnu"	S. D. Burman		
Jugnu	"Gir Gaya Jhumka"	S. D. Burman		Kishore Kumar
Jugnu	"Meri Ye Payaliya Geet Tere Gaye"	S. D. Burman		
Bandhe Haath	"Yeh Kaun Aaj Aaya"	Rahul Dev Burman		
Bandhe Haath	"Tune Chheen Liya"	Rahul Dev Burman		
Daag	"Ab Chahe Ma Roothe Yaa Baba"	Laxmikant Pyarelal	Sahir Ludhianvi	Kishore Kumar
Daag	"Hum Aur Tum Tum Aur Hum"	Laxmikant Pyarelal	Sahir Ludhianvi	Kishore Kumar
Daag	"Jab Bhi Jee Chaahe"	Laxmikant Pyarelal	Sahir Ludhianvi	solo
Daag	"Ni Main Yaar Manana Ni"	Laxmikant Pyarelal	Sahir Ludhianvi	Minoo Purushottam
Daag	"Hawa Chale Kaise"	Laxmikant Pyarelal	Sahir Ludhianvi	solo
Loafer	"Main Tere Ishq Mein"	Anand Bakshi		solo
Phagun	"Piya Sang Khelo Hori Phagun Aayo Re"	S. D. Burman	Majrooh Sultanpuri	solo
Phagun	"Sandhya Jo Aaye Man Ud Jaaye Jaane Re Kahaan"	S. D. Burman	Majrooh Sultanpuri	solo
Barkha Bahar	"Nazar Ka Yeh Paigham Diya Jo Aapne Mere Naam"	Laxmikant Pyarelal		Mohammad Rafi
Anamika	"Bahon Mein Chale Aao"	R. D. Burman	Majrooh Sultanpuri	
Anamika	"Bahon Mein Chale Aao (with dialogues)"	R. D. Burman	Majrooh Sultanpuri	Jaya Bachchan, Sanjeev Kumar
Yaadon Ki Baaraat	"Yaadon Ki Baaraat Nikli Hai Aaj Dil Ke Dware (Female)"	R. D. Burman	Majrooh Sultanpuri	Padmini Kolhapure, Sushma Shrestha

==== 1974 ====
Film	Song	Composer(s)	Writer(s)	Co-artist(s)	Notes
Kora Kagaz	"Roothe Roothe Piya"	Salil Chowdhari	Vayalar		Best Female Playback Singer
Aap Ki Kasam	"Jai Jai Shiv Shankar"	R.D. Burman	Anand Bakshi	Kishore Kumar	#2 on Bianca Geetmala Annual List 1974
Aap Ki Kasam	"Karwatein Badalte Rahein"	R.D. Burman	Anand Bakshi	Kishore Kumar	#17 on Bianca Geetmala Annual List 1974
Aap Ki Kasam	"Paas Nahin Aana"	R.D. Burman	Anand Bakshi	Kishore Kumar	
Aap Ki Kasam	"Suno Kaho Kaha Suna"	R.D. Burman	Anand Bakshi	Kishore Kumar	
Aap Ki Kasam	"Chori Chori Chupke Chupke"	R.D. Burman	Anand Bakshi		
Humshakal	"Kahe Ko Bulaya Mujhe Balma Pyar Mein Naam Se"	R. D. Burman	Anand Bakshi	Mohammed Ravi	
Aarop	"Nainon Mein Darpan Hai"	Bhupen Hazarika	Maya Govind	Kishore Kumar	

==== 1975 ====
Film	Song	Composer(s)	Writer(s)	Co-artist(s)
Julie	"Yeh Raatein Nayi Purani"	Rajesh Roshan	Anand Bakshi	
Julie	"Bhool Gaya Sab Kuch"	Rajesh Roshan	Anand Bakshi	Kishore Kumar
Zakhmee	"Aao Tujhe Chaand Pe Jaye"	Bappi Lahiri		solo
Zakhmee	"Abhi Abhi Thi Dushmani"	Bappi Lahiri		solo
Vardaan	"Dekho Dekho Dil Ka Taufa"	Kalyanji–Anandji		solo
Sunehra Sansar	"Bheegi Bheegi Hawa Hai, Kali Kali Ghata Hai"	Naushad	Anand Bakshi	Mukesh
Sunehra Sansar	"Meri Jawani Meri Dushman Bani Re"	Naushad	Anand Bakshi	Sushma Shrestha
Warrant	"Ladi Najariya Ladi"	R. D. Burman	Anand Bakshi	Kishore Kumar
Warrant	"Mein Tumse Mohabbat"	R. D. Burman	Anand Bakshi	solo
Umar Qaid	"Yaad Rahega Pyar Ka"	Sonik–Omi		Mukesh
Prem Kahani	"Chal Dariya Mein"	Laxmikant–Pyarelal		Kishore Kumar
Prem Kahani	"Prem Kahani Mein"	Laxmikant–Pyarelal		Kishore Kumar
Prem Kahani	"Phool Ahista Phenko"	Laxmikant–Pyarelal		Mukesh
Prem Kahani	"Nadiya Se Bichhda"	Laxmikant–Pyarelal		solo
Chaitali	"Dharti Ambar Nind Se Jaage"	Laxmikant–Pyarelal		Manna Dey
Chaitali	"Mehbooba Naam Hai Mera"	Laxmikant–Pyarelal		solo
Chaitali	"Sa Ni Dha Pa Ma Ga Ni Dha"	Laxmikant–Pyarelal		solo
Vandana	"Aapki Inayaten, Aapke Karam"	Ravi	Ravi	solo
Vandana	"O Jag Ke Palanhare"	Ravi	Ravi	solo
Vandana	"Rut Hai Jawan"	Ravi	Ravi	solo
Dharam Karam	"Tu Kahan Gayee Thi"	R. D. Burman	Majrooh Sultanpuri	Kishore Kumar
Dharam Karam	"Nachan Nahin Aawat"	R. D. Burman	Majrooh Sultanpuri	solo
Dharam Karam	"Mukh Pe Jo Chhidka Pani"	R. D. Burman	Majrooh Sultanpuri	Kishore Kumar
Sanyasi	"Chal Sanyasi Mandir Mein"	Shankar–Jaikishan	Vishweshwar Sharma	Mukesh
Sanyasi	"Sun Baal Bramhachari"	Shankar–Jaikishan	Verma Malik	Mukesh
Sanyasi	"Bali Umariya Bhajan Karoon Kaise"	Shankar–Jaikishan	Vitalbhai Patel	Mukesh
Sanyasi	"Sham-e-Furqat Ka Dhal Gaya Saya"	Shankar–Jaikishan	Hasrat Jaipuri	Premnath
Sanyasi	"Jaise Mera Roop Rangila"	Shankar–Jaikishan	Vishweshwar Sharma	solo
Sanyasi	"Yeh Hai Geeta Ka Gyan"	Shankar–Jaikishan	M. G. Hashmat	Mukesh
Dharmatma	"Meri Galiyon Se Logo Ki Yaari"	Kalyanji Anandji	Indevaar	Mahendra Kapoor
Chupke Chupke	"Ab Ke Sajan Saawan Mein"	S. D. Burman	Anand Bakshi	
Chupke Chupke	"Baagon Mein Kaise Ye Phol Khilte Hai"	S. D. Burman	Anand Bakshi	Mukesh
Chupke Chupke	"Chupke Chupke Chal Re Purvaiya"	S. D. Burman	Anand Bakshi	solo
Pratigya	"Main Jangal Ki Morni"	Laxmikant–Pyarelal	Anand Bakshi	solo
Pratigya	"Pardesi Aaya Des Mein"	Laxmikant–Pyarelal	Anand Bakshi	solo
Pratigya	"Uth Nind Se Mirziya Jaag Ja"	Laxmikant–Pyarelal	Anand Bakshi	Mohammed Rafi
Apne Rang Hazaar	"Ganga Me Duba Na Jamuna Me Duba"	Laxmikant–Pyarelal		solo
Apne Rang Hazaar	"Is Qadar Aap Humko Jo Tadpayenge"	Laxmikant–Pyarelal		solo
Zinda Dil	"Nahi Nahi Jana Nahi Abhi Nahi"	Laxmikant–Pyarelal		solo
Zinda Dil	"Sham Suhani Ayi Khusiya Banke Pahli Bar"	Laxmikant–Pyarelal		Mahendra Kapoor, Shailendra Singh
Sewak	"Mera Naam Bada Badnam"	Laxmikant–Pyarelal		solo

==== 1976 ====
Film	Song	Composer(s)	Writer(s)	Co-artist(s)
Nagin	"Tere Sang Pyar Mein"	Laxmikant–Pyarelal	Verma Malik	
Adalat	"Tumse Door Rehke"	Kalyanji Anandji	Gulshan Bawra	Mohammad Rafi
Kabhi Kabhie	"Kabhi Kabhie Mere Dil Mein" (II)	Khayyam	Sahir Ludhianvi	Mukesh
Kabhi Kabhie	"Tera Phoolon Jaisa Rang"	Khayyam	Sahir Ludhianvi	Kishore Kumar
Kabhi Kabhie	"Mere Ghar Aaye Ek Nanhi Pari"	Khayyam	Sahir Ludhianvi	
Kabhi Kabhie	"Surkh Jode Ki Yeh Jagmagahat"	Khayyam	Sahir Ludhianvi	Pamela Chopra
Kabhi Kabhie	"Tere Chehre Se"	Khayyam	Sahir Ludhianvi	Kishore Kumar
Laila Majnu	"Husn Hazir Hai"	Madan Mohan, Jaidev	Sahir Ludhianvi	
Laila Majnu	"Is Reshmi Paazzeb Ki Jhankar"	Madan Mohan, Jaidev	Sahir Ludhianvi	Mohammed Rafi
Laila Majnu	"Ab Agar Hum Se Khudai Bhi"	Madan Mohan, Jaidev	Sahir Ludhianvi	Mohammed Rafi
Laila Majnu	"Likh Kar Tera Naam Zameen Par"	Madan Mohan, Jaidev	Sahir Ludhianvi	Mohammed Rafi
Laila Majnu	"Koi Pathar Se Na Mare Mere Deewane Ko"	Madan Mohan, Jaidev	Sahir Ludhianvi	solo
Koi Jeeta Koi Haara	"O Baba Shaadi Tum Na Karna"	Laxmikant Pyarelal	Anand Bakshi	solo
Jeevan Jyoti	"Duniya Rang Badalti Jaye"	Salil Chowdhury	Anand Bakshi	solo
Jeevan Jyoti	"Jis Dware Par Ghar Ki Bahu"	Salil Chowdhury	Anand Bakshi	solo
Jeevan Jyoti	"Ranjhe Ki Aankhon Se Dekho Heer Ko, Mujhko Chhedo"	Salil Chowdhury	Anand Bakshi	Kishore Kumar
Lagaam	"Aaj Pawan Ki Chal Chura Ke"	Kalyanji Anandji	Anand Bakshi	
Lagaam	"Jaise Moti Seep Se Bichhde"	Kalyanji Anandji	Anand Bakshi	
Lagaam	"Aadhi Aadhi Raat Meri Payaliya Bhaje"	Kalyanji Anandji	Mohammed Rafi	
Maha Chor	"Main Tumse Pyar Karti Hoon"	R. D. Burman	Anand Bakshi	Kishore Kumar
Maha Chor	"Tu Kya Mujhe Barbaad Karega"	R. D. Burman	Anand Bakshi	solo
Naach Uthe Sansaar	"Tere Sang Jeena, Tere Sang Marna"	Laxmikant Pyarelal		Mohammad Rafi
Naach Uthe Sansaar	"Naach Uthe Sansaar"	Laxmikant Pyarelal		Mohammad Rafi
Nehle Pe Dehla	"Sawan Ka Mahina Aa Gaya"	R. D. Burman	Anand Bakshi	Kishore Kumar
Nehle Pe Dehla	"Logon Ki Zuban Pe Apna Naam"	R. D. Burman	Anand Bakshi	Manna Dey, Kishore Kumar
Nehle Pe Dehla	"Mashook Apne Shabab Mein"	R. D. Burman	Anand Bakshi	
Rangila Ratan	"Tumhin Ho Tumhin Ho Jane-Jaan"	Kalyanji Anandji	Gulshan Bawra	Kishore Kumar
Udhar Ka Sindur	"Buddha Pyar Mangda"	Rajesh Roshan		solo
Udhar Ka Sindur	"Maa Ab Toh Main Bhi"	Rajesh Roshan		solo
Udhar Ka Sindur	"Maa Kabhi Main Bhi Piya Ghar"	Rajesh Roshan		solo

==== 1977 ====
Film	Song	Composer(s)	Writer(s)	Co-artist(s)
Dharam Veer	"Band Ho Mutthi To Laakh Ki"	Laxmikant–Pyarelal	Anand Bakshi	Asha Bhosle
Dharam Veer	"Hum Banjaaro Ki Baat Mat Pucho Ji"	Laxmikant–Pyarelal	Anand Bakshi	Kishore Kumar
Khoon Pasina	"Main Teri Ho Gayee Tu Mera Ho Gaya"	Kalyanji–Anandji		
Hatyara	"Sone Ka Chabutara, Uspe Naache Mor"	Kalyanji–Anandji		
Hira Aur Patthar	"Naam Tera Bhale"	Kalyanji–Anandji		
Hira Aur Patthar	"Hum Tum Pehali Baar Mile Hai"	Kalyanji–Anandji		
Pratima Aur Paayal	"Meri Payal Ki Jhankar"	Bappi Lahiri		
Priyatama	"Tere Bin Kaise Din"	Rajesh Roshan		
Kasam Khoon Ki	"Kyun Dekhte Ho Gair Ko"	Kalyanji Anandji		
Kasam Khoon Ki	"Main Pital Ki Payaliya"	Kalyanji Anandji		
Farishta Ya Qatil	"Kuch Aise Bandhan Hote Hai Jo Bin Baandhe Bandh Jaati Hai"	Kalyanji Anandji		Mukesh
Yehi Hai Zindagi	"Hum Mil Gaye"	Rajesh Roshan		Mohammed Rafi
Yehi Hai Zindagi	"Dilruba Aa Meri Bahon Mein"	Rajesh Roshan		Kishore Kumar
Ek Hi Raasta	"Oh Ho Dheere Dheere"	Rajesh Roshan		

==== 1978 ====
Film	Song	Composer(s)	Writer(s)	Co-artist(s)
Muqaddar Ka Sikandar	"Pyar Zindagi Hai"	Kalyanji Anandji	Anjaan	Mahendra Kapoor, Asha Bhosle
Muqaddar Ka Sikandar	"Dil Toh Hai Dil"	Kalyanji Anandji	Anjaan	
Muqaddar Ka Sikandar	"Salaam-e-Ishq Meri Jaan"	Kalyanji Anandji	Prakash Mehra	Kishore Kumar
Trishul	"Jaaneman Tum Kamaal Karte Ho"	Khayyam	Sahir Ludhianvi	Kishore Kumar
Trishul	"Jo Ho Yaar Apna"	Khayyam	Sahir Ludhianvi	Kishore Kumar
Trishul	"Mohabbat Bade Kaam Ki Cheez Hai"	Khayyam	Sahir Ludhianvi	Kishore Kumar, K.J. Yesudas
Trishul	"Aapki Meheki Hui Zulf Ko"	Khayyam	Sahir Ludhianvi	K.J. Yesudas
Trishul	"Gapoochi Gapoochi Gam Gam"	Khayyam	Sahir Ludhianvi	Nitin Mukesh
Trishul	"Tu Mere Saath Rahega"	Khayyam	Sahir Ludhianvi	
Anjane Mein	"Jeevan Ke Sab Sukh Paye Tu" (female)	Kalyanji–Anandji	Gulshan Bawra	
Anjane Mein	"Sachai Ki Raah Mein"	Kalyanji–Anandji	Gulshan Bawra	
Nasbandi	"Kis Daam Pe"	Kalyanji–Anandji	Hullad Moradabadi	
Kasme Vaade	"Kasme Vaade Nibhayenge Hum" (I)	R. D. Burman	Gulshan Bawra	
Kasme Vaade	"Kasme Vaade Nibhayenge Hum" (II)	R. D. Burman	Gulshan Bawra	Kishore Kumar
Main Tulsi Tere Aangan Ki	"Chhap Tilak Sab Chhini Re"	Laxmikant Pyarelal	Anand Bakshi	Asha Bhosle
Main Tulsi Tere Aangan Ki	"Main Tulsi Tere Aangan Ki"	Laxmikant Pyarelal	Anand Bakshi	solo
Main Tulsi Tere Aangan Ki	"Main Tera Kya Le Jaoongi"	Laxmikant Pyarelal	Anand Bakshi	solo
Main Tulsi Tere Aangan Ki	"Mat Ro Behna"	Laxmikant Pyarelal	Anand Bakshi	solo
Swarg Narak	"I Love You"	Rajesh Roshan	Harindranath Chattopadhyay	solo
Don	"Jiska Mujhe Tha Intezaar, Jiske Liye Dil Tha Bekaraar"	Kalyanji–Anandji		Kishore Kumar

==== 1979 ====
Film	Song	Composer(s)	Writer(s)	Co-artist(s)
Suhaag	"Aaj Imtihan Hai"	Laxmikant–Pyarelal		
Suhaag	"Athra Baras Ki Tu Hone Ko Aayi Re"	Laxmikant–Pyarelal		Mohammed Rafi
Jaani Dushman	"Saare Rishte Naate Todke"	Laxmikant–Pyarelal	Verma Malik	
Mr. Natwarlal	"Pardesia, Yeh Sach Hai Piya, Sab Kehte Hain"	Rajesh Roshan	Anand Bakshi	Kishore Kumar
Sargam	"Parbat Ke Us Paar, Parbat Ke Is Paar"	Laxmikant–Pyarelal	Anand Bakshi	Mohammed Rafi
Sargam	"Koyal Boli, Duniya Doli, Samjho Dil Ki Boli"	Laxmikant–Pyarelal	Anand Bakshi	Mohammed Rafi
Sargam	"Dafliwale Dafli Baja"	Laxmikant–Pyarelal	Anand Bakshi	Mohammed Rafi
Khandaan	"Ye Mulaqat Ek Bahana Hai"	Khayyam	Naqsh Lyallpuri	
Kaala Patthar	"Ek Raasta Hai Zindagi"	Rajesh Roshan	Sahir Ludhianvi	Kishore Kumar
Kaala Patthar	"Baahon Mein Teri"	Rajesh Roshan	Sahir Ludhianvi	Mohammad Rafi
Kaala Patthar	"Meri Dooron Se Aye Baaraat"	Rajesh Roshan	Sahir Ludhianvi	
Kaala Patthar	"Dhoom Mache Dhoom"	Rajesh Roshan	Sahir Ludhianvi	Mohammad Rafi, Mahendra Kapoor, S.K. Mohan
Hamare Tumhare	"Kuchh Tum Karo Kuchh Hum Karen"	R. D. Burman	Yogesh	Kishore Kumar
Janta Hawaldar	"Aadhi Roti Saara Kabaab"	Rajesh Roshan		Anwar
Amar Deep	"Halki Si Kasak Masak Hoti Hai Dil Mein"	Laxmikant–Pyarelal	Amanda Bakshi	Kishore Kumar
Surakksha	"Dil Tha Akela Akela"	Bappi Lahiri	Ramesh Pant	Bappi Lahiri
Salaam Memsaab	"Hum Bhi Raahon Mein Khade Hain Yaar, Idhar Dekh Lo"	R. D. Burman	Majrooh Sultanpuri	Kishore Kumar
Prem Bandhan	"Wada Nahin Karte Kisi Se"	Laxmikant–Pyarelal	Anand Bakshi	Mahendra Kapoor
Prem Bandhan	"Main Tere Pyar Mein Pagal"	Laxmikant–Pyarelal	Anand Bakshi	Kishore Kumar
Aatish	"O Babu Managera Ve, O Babu Managera Ve"	Ravindran Jain		Mohammed Rafi

=== 1980s ===
==== 1980 ====
Film	Song	Composer(s)	Writer(s)	Co-artist(s)
Karz	"Tu Kitne Baras Ki, Tu Kitne Baras Ka"	Laxmikant–Pyarelal	Anand Bakshi	Kishore Kumar
Agreement	"Jane Kyun Mujhe"	Bappi Lahiri	Gulshan Bawra	
Agreement	"Suno Suno Baat"	Bappi Lahiri	Gulshan Bawra	
Kranti	"Zindagi Ki Na Toote"	Laxmikant–Pyarelal	Santosh Anand	Nitin Mukesh
Kranti	"Chanaa Jor Garam Baabu"	Laxmikant–Pyarelal	Santosh Anand	Nitin Mukesh, Mohammed Rafi, Kishore Kumar
Kranti	"Looie Shama Sha"	Laxmikant–Pyarelal	Santosh Anand	Nitin Mukesh
Kranti	"Dilwale Tera Naam Kya Hai"	Laxmikant–Pyarelal	Santosh Anand	Nitin Mukesh, Manna Dey, Mahendra Kapoor, Shailendra Singh
Kranti	"Pilaa De Saaqi, Maaraa Thumakaa"	Laxmikant–Pyarelal	Santosh Anand	
Choron Ki Baaraat	"Aakhri Waqt Koi Dua Maang Le"	Laxmikant–Pyarelal	Anand Bakshi	
Choron Ki Baaraat	"Teri Meri Dosti Ho Gayi, Sari Duniya Se Dushmani Ho Gayi"	Laxmikant–Pyarelal	Anand Bakshi	Kishore Kumar
Alibaba Aur 40 Chor	"Aaja Sar-e-Bazar"	R. D. Burman		solo
Alibaba Aur 40 Chor	"Qayamat Qayamat"	R. D. Burman		solo
Alibaba Aur 40 Chor	"Sare Shahar Mein Ek Haseen Hai, Aur Woh Main Hoon"	R. D. Burman		Asha Bhosle
Thodisi Bewafaii	"Ankhon Men Humne Aapke Sapne"	Khayyam	Gulzar	Kishore Kumar
Thodisi Bewafaii	"Hazaar Rahen Mud Ke Dekhin"	Khayyam	Gulzar	Kishore Kumar
Garam Khoon	"Achhi Bhi Lagti Hu Sundar Bhi"	Shankar Jaikishan	Vithalbhai Patel	solo
Garam Khoon	"Ek Chehra Dil Ke Kareeb"	Shankar Jaikishan	Singhar	solo

==== 1981 ====
Film	Song	Composer(s)	Writer(s)	Co-artist(s)
Naseeb	"Mere Naseeb Mein Tu Hai Ke Nahi"	Laxmikant–Pyarelal	Anand Bakshi	
Naseeb	"Rang Jamake Jayenge, Chakkar Chalake Jayenge, Jhumke, Ghumke Sabko Ghumake Jayenge"	Laxmikant–Pyarelal	Anand Bakshi	Kishore Kumar, Mohammed Rafi, Shailendra Singh, Asha Bhosle, Usha Mangeshkar
Kudrat	"Tune O Rangeele Kaisa Jaadu Kiya"	R D Burman		
Dard	"Naa Jane Kya Huwa Jo"	Khayyam	Naqsh Lyallpuri	
Dard	"Ahal E Dil Yu Bhee"	Khayyam	Naqsh Lyallpuri	
Silsila	"Ladki Hai Ya Shola"	Shiv–Hari	Rajendra Krishan	Kishore Kumar
Silsila	"Sar Se Sarke"	Shiv–Hari	Hasan Kamal	Kishore Kumar
Silsila	"Dekha Ek Khwaab"	Shiv–Hari	Javed Akhtar	Kishore Kumar
Silsila	"Yeh Kahaan Aa Gaye Hum"	Shiv–Hari	Javed Akhtar	Amitabh Bachchan
Silsila	"Neela Aasman" (part 2)	Shiv–Hari	Javed Akhtar	
Silsila	"Jo Tum Todo Piya"	Shiv–Hari	Mirabai	
Aas Paas	"Dariya Mein Phenk Do Chabi"	Laxmikant–Pyarelal		Kishore Kumar
Aas Paas	"Shaher Mein Charcha Hai"	Laxmikant–Pyarelal		Mohammed Rafi
Aas Paas	"Bhare Bazaar Mein"	Laxmikant–Pyarelal		
Aas Paas	"Main Phool Bechti Hoon"	Laxmikant–Pyarelal		
Aas Paas	"Ham Ko Bhi Gham Ne Mara"	Laxmikant–Pyarelal		
Aas Paas	"Tere Long Da Piya Lashkara"	Laxmikant–Pyarelal		Mohammed Rafi
Aapas Ki Baat	"Kehni Hai Tumse Do Baaten, Kahunga Magar"	Anu Malik	Anjaan	Shailendra Singh
Dhanwan	"Yeh Ankhein Dekh Kar" – Lata Mangeshkar	Hridaynath Mangeshkar	Sahir Ludhianvi	Suresh Wadkar
Dhanwan	"Kuchh Log Mohabbat Ko"	Hridaynath Mangeshkar	Sahir Ludhianvi	
Dhanwan	"Balle Balle Bhai Reshmi Dupatta"	Hridaynath Mangeshkar	Sahir Ludhianvi	Mahendra Kapoor

==== 1982 ====
Film	Song	Composer(s)	Writer(s)	Co-artist(s)
Bazaar	"Dikhaai Die Yun Ki"	Khayyam	Mir Taqi Mir	solo
Bazaar	"Phir Chhidi Raat, Baat"	Khayyam	Mir Taqi Mir	solo
Vidhaata	"O Saathi Aa"	Kalyanji–Anandji	Anand Bakshi	solo
Samraat	"Kal Na Maana, Parson Na Maana"	Laxmikant Pyarelal	Anand Bakshi	solo
Samraat	"Aankhon Ka Salaam Lo"	Laxmikant Pyarelal	Anand Bakshi	Mohammed Rafi, Manna Dey
Sawaal	"Yeh Safar"	Khayyam	Majrooh Sultanpuri	Anwar
Sawaal	"Ab Jaan Rahe Ya Jaye"	Khayyam	Majrooh Sultanpuri	Nitin Mukesh
Vakil Babu	"Hum Kahan Kho Gaye"	Laxmikant Pyarelal	Anand Bakshi	solo
Vakil Babu	"Dil Mein Sholay"	Laxmikant Pyarelal	Anand Bakshi	solo
Mangal Pandey	"Nasha Jo Hai Shabab Mein"	Anu Malik		solo

==== 1983 ====
Film	Song	Composer(s)	Writer(s)	Co-artist(s)
Agar Tum Na Hote	"Humein Aur Jeene Ki"	R.D.Burman	Gulshan Bawra	Kishore Kumar
Razia Sultan	"Aye Dil-e-Naadaan"	Khayyam		
Razia Sultan	"Jalataa Hai Badan"	Khayyam		
Razia Sultan	"Khwaab Ban Kar Koyee"	Khayyam		
Razia Sultan	"Chum Kar Raat Jo Sulaayegi"	Khayyam		
Betaab	"Jab Hum Jawan Honge"	R D Burman	Anand Bakshi	Shabbir Kumar
Betaab	"Apne Dil Se Badi Dushmani Ki"	R D Burman	Anand Bakshi	Shabbir Kumar
Betaab	"Badal Yun Garajta Hai"	R D Burman	Anand Bakshi	Shabbir Kumar
Himmatwala	"Nainon Mein"	Bappi Lahiri		Kishore Kumar
Hero	"Mohabbat Ye Mohabbat"	Laxmikant Pyarelal	Anand Bakshi	Suresh Wadkar
Hero	"Nindya Se Jaagi Bahaar"	Laxmikant Pyarelal	Anand Bakshi	
Hero	"Pyar Karne Wale Kabhi Darte Nahi"	Laxmikant Pyarelal	Anand Bakshi	Manhar Udhas
Masoom	"Tujhse Naaraz Nahi Zindagi"	R. D. Burman	Gulzar	

==== 1984 ====
Film	Song	Composer(s)	Writer(s)	Co-artist(s)
Yeh Ishq Nahin Aasaan	"Likha Hai Mere Dil Pe"	Laxmikant Pyarelal		Shabbir Kumar
Jhutha Sach	"Kaisee Lag Rahee Hu Mai"	R D Burman		Kishore Kumar
Jagir	"Chor Tera Naam Hai"	R D Burman		Kishore Kumar
Bhavna	"Tu Kahan Aa Gayi Zindagi"	Bappi Lahiri	Kaifi Azmi	
Duniya	"Teri Meri Zindagi"	R. D. Burman	Javed Akhtar	
Duniya	"Gehare Halake Halake Gehare"	R. D. Burman	Javed Akhtar	Kishore Kumar
Laila	"Geeto Se Sargam"	Usha Khanna		Mahmohan Singh
Laila	"Saath Jiyenge Saath Marenge"	Usha Khanna		Mahmohan Singh
Laila	"Aaj Sar E Mehfil Ikraar"	Usha Khanna		
Laila	"Tu Jo Kahe To"	Usha Khanna		
Hum Hain Lajawaab	"Aaya Shabaab Aaya"	R D Burman		
Hum Hain Lajawaab	"Duniya Badal Gayi Hai"	R D Burman		Anwar
Haisiyat	"Jaagi Jaagi Re Jaagi"	Bappi Lahiri		Kishore Kumar
Inteha	"Tum Jab Bhi Yaad Aaoge"	Rajesh Roshan		
Ek Nai Paheli	"Is Manko Ik Thes Lagi"	Laxmikant Pyarelal		
Ek Nai Paheli	"Yeh Preet Aisi Paheli"	Laxmikant Pyarelal		Kavita Krishnamurthy
Lorie	"Aaja Nindiya Aaja"	Khayyam		
Lorie	"Bhar Le Tumhe Baahon Mein"	Khayyam		
Baazi	"Mere Saathi Jeevan Saathi"	Laxmikant Pyarelal	Anand Bakshi	Shabbir Kumar
Maang Bharo Sajana	"Deepak Mere Suhag Ka"	Laxmikant Pyarelal	Anand Bakshi	Asha Bhosle
Maang Bharo Sajana	"Sajan Ho, Sajan Kyu Munh"	Laxmikant Pyarelal	Anand Bakshi	Kishore Kumar
Maang Bharo Sajana	"Ib Na Sunungi"	Laxmikant Pyarelal	Anand Bakshi	
Tohfa	"Alabelaa Mausam Kahataa"	Bappi Lahiri		Kishore Kumar
All Rounder	"Jaan Jab Jab Teri"	Laxmikant Pyarelal		Shabbir Kumar
Anand Aur Anand	"Nasha Hai Ho Mujhe Bhi"	R. D. Burman		Abhijeet
Jaag Utha Insan	"Tarpat Beete Tum"	Rajesh Roshan		
Jawaani	"Gali Gali Dhunda Dhundha"	R D Burman		Amit Kumar
Jawaani	"Sajna Main Sada"	R D Burman		
Jeene Nahi Doonga	"Tum Yaad Na Aaya Karo"	Laxmikant Pyarelal		
Tarang	"Barase Ghan Saari Raat"	Vanraj Bhatia	Raghuveer Sahay	

==== 1985 ====
Film	Song	Composer(s)	Writer(s)	Co-artist(s)
Sanjog	"Yashodaa Kaa Nandalaalaa"	Laxmikant Pyarelal		
Babu	"Aise Rang De Piya"	Rajesh Roshan	Majrooh Sultanpuri	Kishore Kumar
Babu	"Ae Hawa"	Rajesh Roshan	Majrooh Sultanpuri	
Alag Alag	"Dil Me Aag Lagaye"	R D Burman	Anand Bakshi	Kishore Kumar
Alag Alag	"Is Jeevan Ki Yahi"	R D Burman	Anand Bakshi	
Alag Alag	"Kagaz Kalam Davaat Le Ye"	R D Burman	Anand Bakshi	Kishore Kumar
Alag Alag	"Kuch Humko Tumhse Kehna"	R D Burman	Anand Bakshi	Kishore Kumar
Alag Alag	"Dil Me Aag Lagaye" (female)	R D Burman	Anand Bakshi	
Utsav	"Man Kyon Bahakaa Re"	Laxmkant Pyalelal		Asha Bhosle
Utsav	"Neelam Ke Nabh Chhayee"	Laxmkant Pyalelal		
Jhoothi	"Chanda Dekhe Chanda Toh"	Bappi Lahiri		Kishore Kumar
Faasle	"In Aankhon Ke Zeenon Se"	Shiv Hari		Kishore Kumar
Faasle	"Janam Janam Mere Sanam"	Shiv Hari		Kishore Kumar
Faasle	"Sun Le Ye Saara Zamana"	Shiv Hari		
Faasle	"Chandni Tu Hai Kahan, Maine"	Shiv Hari		Kishore Kumar
Faasle	"Hum Choop Hain Ke"	Shiv Hari		Kishore Kumar
Sur Sangam	"Jaaon Tore Charan Kamal Pe"	Laxmikant Pyarelal		
Sur Sangam	"Maika Piya Bhulave"	Laxmikant Pyarelal		Suresh Wadkar
Aakhir Kyon?	"Dushman Na Kare Dost"	Rajesh Roshan		Amit Kumar
Aakhir Kyon?	"Sham Huyeee Chadh Aaye"	Rajesh Roshan		
He Meraa Ghar Mere Bachche	"Kya Hoti Hai Oonchi Jaat"	Laxmikant Pyarelal		
Meri Jung	"Zindagi Har Kadam Ek"	Laxmikant Pyarelal		Shabbir Kumar
Meri Jung	"Zindagi Har Kadam Ek"	Laxmikant Pyarelal		Nitin Mukesh
Rusvai	"Yeh Baat Hai Bilkul Sachchi"	R D Burman		
Saagar	"Saagar Kinaare"	R D Burman		Kishore Kumar
Ram Teri Ganga Maili	"Raam Teri Ganga Maili"	Ravindra Jain		
Ram Teri Ganga Maili	"Husn Pahadon Ka"	Ravindra Jain		Suresh Wadkar
Ram Teri Ganga Maili	"Ek Radha Ek Meera"	Ravindra Jain		
Ram Teri Ganga Maili	"Tujhe Bulayen Yeh Meri"	Ravindra Jain		
Ram Teri Ganga Maili	"Sun Sahiba Sun"	Ravindra Jain	Hasrat Jaipuri	
Ram Teri Ganga Maili	"Yaara O Yaara Tujhse Mila"	Ravindra Jain		Suresh Wadkar
Bewafai	"Hum Apni Wafa Yaad"	Bappi Lahiri		
Sitamgar	"Tum Dil Walon Ke Aage"	R D Burman		Kishore Kumar
Mohabbat	"Naina Ye Barse"	Bappi Lahiri		
Masterji	"Bulbul Mere Bata"	Bappi Lahiri		
Ek Se Bhale Do	"Laapa Changa Mein Naache"	R. D. Burman		R. D. Burman, Kishore Kumar, Asha Bhosle
Yudh	"Mehrbano Qadar Dano"	Kalyanji Anandji		
Ulta Seedha	"Yaar Ki Gali Din"	Rajesh Roshan		Kishore Kumar
Arjun	"Bhuri Bhuri Aankhon Wala"	R. D. Burman	Javed Akhtar	
Rahi Badal Gaye	"Ek Baat Dil Me Aayi"	R. D. Burman	Gulshan Bawra	Kishore Kumaar
Kabhi Ajnabi The	"Geet Mere Hoton"	Vijay Singh		
Kabhi Ajnabi The	"Kabhie Ajnabi The Zameen Aasman"	Vijay Singh		Suresh Wadkar
Kabhi Ajnabi The	"Dil Kee Iss Dehlij"	Vijay Singh		
Kabhi Ajnabi The	"Is Dafaa"	Vijay Singh		
Kabhi Ajnabi The	"Aaja Mere Sanam, Baithe"	Vijay Singh		
Pighalta Aasman	"Mujhe Aisa Mila Mot"	Kalyanji Anandji		
Ram Tere Kitne Nam	"Manzil Thi Kahin"	R D Burman		
Ram Tere Kitne Nam	"Machal Machal Jaataa"	R D Burman		
Lava	"Hum Tum Dono Milke"	R D Burman	Anand Bakshi	Kishore Kumar
Lava	"Koi Bhi Naam Do"	R D Burman	Anand Bakshi	
Pyar Jhukta Nahin	"Tumse Milkar Na Jaane Kyun"	Laxmikant Pyarelal		Shabbir Kumar
Pyar Jhukta Nahin	"Tumhe Apna Sathi"	Laxmikant Pyarelal		Shabbir Kumar
Pyar Jhukta Nahin	"Chahe Lakh Toofan Aaye"	Laxmikant Pyarelal		Shabbir Kumar
Pyar Jhukta Nahin	"Ho Dilbar Janiya"	Laxmikant Pyarelal		Shabbir Kumar
Ghulami	"Zihale Masti Makun Barabjish"	Laxmikant Pyarelal	Gulzar	Shabbir Kumar
Ghulami	"Mere Peeko Waqt Beeja Tha"	Laxmikant Pyarelal	Gulzar	
Saagar	"Saagar Kinare"	R. D. Burman		Kishore Kumar

==== 1986 ====
Film	Song	Composer(s)	Writer(s)	Co-artist(s)
Anubhav	"Pyar Kar Dil Ko"	Rajesh Roshan	Indeevar	
Jumbish: A Movement	"Nindiya Tu Mat Soona"	Jaidev		
Samundar	"Ae Sagar Ki Lehero"	R. D. Burman	Anand Bakshi	Kishore Kumar
Samundar	"Us Din Mujhko Bhool"	R. D. Burman	Anand Bakshi	Kishore Kumar
Naam	"Veriya Ve Kiya Kya Kasoor"	Laxmikant Pyarelal	Anand Bakshi	
Allah Rakha	"Doli Leke Yahan"	Anu Malik		
Zindagani	"Jab Se Mile Ho"	R D Burman		
Love and God	"Lute Hamara Pyar"	Naushad		
Love and God	"Mohabbat Ke Nagme Khuda"	Naushad		Manna Dey
Aap Ke Saath	"Jind Le Gaya, Woh Dil Ka"	Laxmikant Pyarelal		
Swarag Se Sunder	"Sun Ri Meri Behna, Sun Ri"	Laxmikant Pyarelal		
Swarag Se Sunder	"Mata Parkat Ho, Devi"	Laxmikant Pyarelal		
Qatl	"Moora Roop Rang M"	Laxmikant Pyarelal		
Qatl	"Koi Nahi Koi Nahi"	Laxmikant Pyarelal		
Ek Pal	"Chupke Chupke Hum"	Bhupen Hazarika		
Ek Pal	"Jane Kya Hai Jee Darta Hai"	Bhupen Hazarika		
Ek Pal	"Mai To Sang Jaaun Banwas"	Bhupen Hazarika		
Nagina	"Main Teree Dushman"	Laxmikant Pyarelal		
Saveray Wali Gaadi	"Din Pyar Ke Ayenge"	R D Burman		
Maqaar	"Sab Kho Diya"	Rajesh Roshan		Manna Dey
Maqaar	"Piya Rang Tere Rang"	Rajesh Roshan		Manna Dey
Pyar Kiya Hai Pyar Karenge	"Mithi Mithi Hai Sardi"	Laxmikant Pyarelal		Mohammad Aziz
Shatru	"Babuji Dil Loge, Babuji Dil"	R D Burman		
Shatru	"Tere Aanchal Mai"	R D Burman		
Aag Aur Shola	"Aaj Subah Jab Main"	Laxmikant Pyarelal		

==== 1987 ====
Film	Song	Composer(s)	Writer(s)	Co-artist(s)
Sindoor	"Patajhar Saavan Basant Bahaar"	Laxmikant Pyarelal		
Sindoor	"Nam Sare Mujhe"	Laxmikant Pyarelal		Mohammad Aziz
Kalyug Aur Ramayan	"Chal Bhag Chale"	Kayanji Anandji		
Dacait	"Woh Teri Duniya Nahin"	R D Burman		
Aag Hi Aag	"Milane Se Pahale Bichhad"	Bappi Lahiri		
Aag Hi Aag	"Milana Tera Aesa"	Bappi Lahiri		
Nazrana	"Jhan Jhanananan Paayal Baaje"	Laxmikant Pyarelal		
Nazrana	"Mera Naam Tu Puchega To"	Laxmikant Pyarelal		
Mera Karam Mera Dharam	"Sir Pe Mukut"	Laxmikant Pyarelal		
Apne Apne	"Apne Apne Sai Lage"	R D Burman		Suresh Wadkar
Apne Apne	"Gyan Ka Daan Hi Sabse Bada"	R D Burman		

==== 1988 ====
Film	Song	Composer(s)	Writer(s)	Co-artist(s)
Namumkin	"Saathi Aisa Lagta Hai"	R. D. Burman		
Hero Hiralal	"Sapano Ki Duniya Hai"	Babla	Hriday Lani	
Vijay	"Zindagi Har Janam"	Shiv–Hari	Nida Fazli	
Vijay	"Badal Pe Chalke Aa"	Shiv–Hari	Nida Fazli	Suresh Wadkar
Vijay	"Meri Ankhe Hai Aap Ki Ankhe"	Shiv–Hari	Nida Fazli	
Kabrastan	"Main Hoon Yahan"	Jagdish Khanna, Uttam Singh		
Hatya	"Zindagi Mehak Jati Hai"	Bappi Lahiri	Indivar	K. J. Yesudas
Ram-Avtar	"Anguli Mein Angoothi"	Laxmikant–Pyarelal		Mohammad Aziz
Paap Ki Duniya	"Bandhan Toote Na"	Bappi Lahiri		Shabbir Kumar
Shahenshah	"Jane Do Jane Do"	Amar Utpal	Anand Bakshi	Mohammad Aziz
Shahenshah	"Ary Hoga Thandear Tu"	Amar Utpal	Anand Bakshi	Kishore Kumar
Ek Naya Rishta	"Kiran Kiran Mein"	Khayyam		
Ek Naya Rishta	"Jise Samjhe The"	Khayyam		Bhupindar Singh
Ganga Jamuna Saraswati	"Sajan Mera Uspar Hai"	Anu Malik	Indevaar	
Ganga Jamuna Saraswati	"Pati Parweshwar Ke Siva"	Anu Malik	Prayaag Raj	
Ganga Jamuna Saraswati	"Nachegi Sarawati"	Anu Malik	Indevaar	
Libaas	"Khamosh Sa Afsana"	R. D. Burman	Gulzar	Suresh Wadker
Libaas	"Sili Hawa Choogayi"	R. D. Burman	Gulzar	
Libaas	"Kiya Bura Hai Kiya"	R. D. Burman	Gulzar	
Libaas	"Phir Kisi Shakhs Nai"	R. D. Burman	Gulzar	

==== 1989 ====
Film	Song	Composer(s)	Writer(s)	Co-artist(s)
Chandni	"Mere Haathon Mein"	Shiv–Hari	Anand Bakshi	Chorus
Chandni	"Mehbooba"	Shiv–Hari	Anand Bakshi	Vinod Rathod
Chandni	"Mitwa"	Shiv–Hari	Anand Bakshi	Babla Mehta
Chandni	"Aa Meri Jaan"	Shiv–Hari	Anand Bakshi	
Batwara	"Ye Ishq Dhunk Bhichwa"	Laxmikant Pyarelal		Ila Arun
Souten Ki Beti	"Kha Thi Ap Zamane Ki"			Kishore Kumar
Souten Ki Beti	"Hum Bhool Gaye Re"			
Clerk	"Jhoom Jhoom Kar Gaao Re"	Jagdish Khanna, Uttam Singh	Manoj Kumar	Mahendra Kapoor
Clerk	"Neelaam Ghar Me Humne"	Jagdish Khanna, Uttam Singh	Manoj Kumar	
Clerk	"Rakh Geeta Pe Haath"	Jagdish Khanna, Uttam Singh	Manoj Kumar	Nitin Mukesh
Clerk	"Tun Tun Tun Tun Tun"	Jagdish Khanna, Uttam Singh	Manoj Kumar	
Santosh	"Ary Logo Tumhara"	Laxmikant Pyarelal		
Santosh	"Ansi Wale Ne Gher Layi"	Laxmikant Pyarelal		
Santosh	"Yun Lagne Lagi"	Laxmikant Pyarelal		Nitin Mukesh
Aakhri Badla	"O Mere Saathi Re"	Salil Choudhury	Yogesh	Kishore Kumar
Galiyon Ka Badshah	"Mujhe Zindagi Ki Dua"	Kalyanji Anandji		
Maine Pyar Kiya	"Aaja Shaam Hone Aayi"	Raam Laxman	Dev Kohli	S. P. Balasubrahmanyam
Maine Pyar Kiya	"Aate Jaate Hansate Gaate"	Raam Laxman		S. P. Balasubrahmanyam
Maine Pyar Kiya	"Dil Deewana Bin Sajna Ke"	Raam Laxman	Asad Bhopali	S. P. Balasubrahmanyam
Maine Pyar Kiya	"Dil Deewana Bin Sajna Ke" (female version)	Raam Laxman	Asad Bhopali	
Maine Pyar Kiya	"Dil De Ke Dard-e-Mohabbat Liya Hai"	Raam Laxman	Asad Bhopali	S. P. Balasubrahmanyam
Maine Pyar Kiya	"Kabootar Jaa, Jaa, Jaa"	Raam Laxman	Asad Bhopali	S. P. Balasubrahmanyam
Maine Pyar Kiya	"Antakshari"	Raam Laxman		S. P. Balasubrahmanyam, Shailendra Singh
Maine Pyar Kiya	"Tum Ladki Ho, Main Ladka Hu"	Raam Laxman	Asad Bhopali	S. P. Balasubrahmanyam, Shailendra Singh
Mitti Aur Sona	"Zindagi Mein Pheli"	Bappi Lahiri		Shabbir Kumar
Ram Lakhan	"Bada Dukh Dina O Ramji"	Laxmikant Pyarelal		

=== 1990s ===
==== 1990 ====
Film	Song	Composer(s)	Writer(s)	Co-artist(s)
Aaj Ka Arjun	"Gori Hain Kalaiyan"	Bappi Lahiri	Anjaan	
Aaj Ka Arjun	"Na Ja Re Na Ja Re"	Bappi Lahiri	Anjaan	
Ghayal	"Mahiya Teri Kasam"	Bappi Lahiri		Pankaj Udhas
Thanedaar	"Aur Bhala Mein Kiya"	Bappi Lahiri	Anjaan	Pankaj Udhas
Pyar Ka Devta	"Jind Tere Naam Kar Di"	Laxmikant Pyarelal		Mohammad Aziz
Police Public	"Main Jis Din Bhula Doon Tera Pyar"	Raamlaxman	Asad Bhopali	Amit Kumar
Awaargi	"Ae Mere Saathiya Tu Koi"	Anu Malik		
Awaargi	"Bali Umar Ne Mera Hal"	Anu Malik		
Kishen Kanhaiya	"Krishna Krishna"	Rajesh Roshan	Indeevar, Payam Sayeedi	Nitin Mukesh
Agneepath	"Raat Bhi Hai Kuch Bheegi Bheegi"	Laxmikant–Pyarelal		
Mera Pati Sirf Mera Hai	"Maine Tujhe Khat Likha, Maine Tera Khat Pada"	Anand–Milind		S. P. Balasubrahmanyam
Tadap	"Jise Pyar Zamana Kehta Hai"	R. D. Burman		Amit Kumar
Jeene Do	"Mere Raja Tu So Ja"	R. D. Burman	Anand Bakshi	solo
Jai Shiv Shankar	"Jai Shiv Shankar"			

==== 1991 ====
Film	Song	Composer(s)	Writer(s)	Co-artist(s)
Lekin...	"Kesariya Baalam"	Hridaynath Mangeshkar	Gulzar	
Lekin...	"Yaara Seeli Seeli"	Hridaynath Mangeshkar	Gulzar	
Lekin...	"Suniyo Ji Araj Mhari" (based on raag Bhoopeshwari)	Hridaynath Mangeshkar	Gulzar	
Lekin...	"Main Ek Sadi Se"	Hridaynath Mangeshkar	Gulzar	
Lekin...	"Ja Ja Re"	Hridaynath Mangeshkar	Gulzar	Hridaynath Mangeshkar
Lamhe	"Mohe Chhedo Naa"	Shiv–Hari	Anand Bakshi	
Lamhe	"Mornii Baagama Bole" (with "Mhaare Rajasthan Ma")	Shiv–Hari	Anand Bakshi	Ila Arun
Lamhe	"Mornii Baagama Bole" (sad version)	Shiv–Hari	Anand Bakshi	
Lamhe	"Kabhi Main Kahoon"	Shiv–Hari	Anand Bakshi	Hariharan
Lamhe	"Megha Re Megha"	Shiv–Hari	Anand Bakshi	
Lamhe	"Yaad Nahi Bhool Gaya"	Shiv–Hari	Anand Bakshi	Suresh Wadkar
Lamhe	"Gudiya Rani"	Shiv–Hari	Anand Bakshi	
Lamhe	"Meri Bindiya"	Shiv–Hari	Anand Bakshi	
Banjaran	"Badali Hai Na Badalegi"	Laxmikant Pyarelal		
Dancer	"Rim Zim Rim Zim Sawan Barse Barse Sawan Pyasa"	Anand Milind		S.P. Balasubrahmanyam
Saudagar	"Radha Nachegi"	Laxmikant Pyarelal		Mohammad Aziz
Saudagar	"Teri Yaad Aati Hain"	Laxmikant Pyarelal		Suresh Wadkar
Do Pal	"Chori Ye Man Tadpe"	Rajesh Roshan		
Heena	"Der Na Ho Jaye Kahin"	Ravindra Jain	Ravindra Jain	Suresh Wadkar
Heena	"Bedardi Tere Pyar Ne"	Ravindra Jain	Ravindra Jain	
Heena	"Anar Dana"	Ravindra Jain	Ravindra Jain	
Heena	"Main Hoon Khushrang Henna"	Ravindra Jain	Ravindra Jain	
Heena	"Main Der Karta Nahin"	Ravindra Jain	Ravindra Jain	Suresh Wadkar
Heena	"Chitthiye"	Ravindra Jain	Ravindra Jain	
Heena	"Janewale O Janewale"	Ravindra Jain	Ravindra Jain	Suresh Wadkar
Farishtay	"Saat Kunwaron Mein Ek Kunwari Laaz Ki Mari"	Bappi Lahiri	Anand Bakshi	
Farishtay	"Tere Bina Jag Lagta Hai Suna"	Bappi Lahiri	Anand Bakshi	Mohammad Aziz
Farishtay	"Shadi Se Pehle Mujhe Nahi Chhoona"	Bappi Lahiri	Anand Bakshi	Mohammad Aziz
Sanam Bewafa	"Chudi Maza Na Degi"	Mahesh–Kishor	Saawan Kumar Tak	
Sanam Bewafa	"Sanam Bewafa"	Mahesh–Kishor	Saawan Kumar Tak	Vipin Sachdev
Sanam Bewafa	"Mujhe Allah Ki Kasam"	Mahesh–Kishor	Saawan Kumar Tak	Vipin Sachdev
Sanam Bewafa	"Allah Karam Karam"	Mahesh–Kishor	Saawan Kumar Tak	
Sanam Bewafa	"Jinke Aage Ji"	Mahesh–Kishor	Saawan Kumar Tak	
100 Days	"Sun Beliya"	Vijay Patil		S.P. Balasubrahmanyam
100 Days	"Le Le Dil De De Dil"	Vijay Patil		Amit Kumar
100 Days	"Pyar Tera Pyar"	Vijay Patil		
100 Days	"Tana Dere Na Tana Na De"	Vijay Patil		S.P. Balasubrahmanyam
100 Days	"Sun Sun Sun Dilruba"	Vijay Patil		S.P. Balasubrahmanyam
Sau Crore	"Pyar Ke Liye Bani Mein"	Bappi Lahiri		
First Love Letter	"Diwani Diwani"	Bappi Lahiri		S. P. Balasubrahmanyam
First Love Letter	"Jab Se Mile Naina"	Bappi Lahiri		
First Love Letter	"Tota Tota"	Bappi Lahiri		S.P. Balasubrahmanyam
Patthar Ke Phool	"Kabhi Tu Chhalia Lagta Hai"	Raamlaxman	Noor Qaskar	S.P. Balasubrahmanyam
Patthar Ke Phool	"Maut Se Kya Darna"	Raamlaxman	Noor Qaskar	S.P. Balasubrahmanyam
Patthar Ke Phool	"Aaja Aaja Aaja"	Raamlaxman	Noor Qaskar	
Patthar Ke Phool	"Tumse Jo Dekhte Hi Pyar Hua"	Raamlaxman	Noor Qaskar	S.P. Balasubrahmanyam
Patthar Ke Phool	"Deewana Dil Bin Sajna Ke Manena"	Raamlaxman	Noor Qaskar	S.P. Balasubrahmanyam
Patthar Ke Phool	"Sajna Tere Bina Kya Jeena"	Raamlaxman	Noor Qaskar	S.P. Balasubrahmanyam
Prem Dharm	"Jeevan Ko Sangeet Banalo"	Anu Malik	Anand Bakshi	
Phool Bane Angaray	"Gori Kab Se Huyee Jawan"	Bappi Lahiri	Anjaan	

==== 1992 ====
Film	Song	Composer(s)	Writer(s)	Co-artist(s)
Khuda Gawah	"Tu Mujhe Kabool"	Laxmikant Pyarelal	Anand Bakshi	
Bewaffa Se Waffa	"Ye Dil Bewaffa Se Waffa"	Usha Khanna	Saawan Kumar Tak	
Bewaffa Se Waffa	"Hum Jaisa Kahin Aap Ko Dilbar"	Usha Khanna	Saawan Kumar Tak	
Bewaffa Se Waffa	"Babul Chhodi Na Jaye"	Usha Khanna	Saawan Kumar Tak	
Insaaf Ki Devi	"Tum Hame"	Bappi Lahiri	Indeevar	
Geet	"Aap Jo Mere Meet Naa Hote"	Bappi Lahiri		
Angaar	"Mushkil Mein Hai Kaun Kisika"	Laxmikant Pyarelal	Anand Bakshi	
Angaar	"Kitni Jaldi Ye Mulaqat Gujar Jati Hai"	Laxmikant Pyarelal	Anand Bakshi	Roop Kumar Rathod
Khel	"Khat Likhna Hai"	Rajesh Roshan	Javed Akhtar	Mohammad Aziz
Radha Ka Sangam	"Do Bol Kheke Hm"	Anu Malik	Hasrat Jaipuri	Kirti Kumar
Radha Ka Sangam	"O Radha Tere Bina Tera"	Anu Malik	Hasrat Jaipuri	Shabbir Kumar
Radha Ka Sangam	"Bichhuwa More Sajna Ka Pyar"	Anu Malik	Hasrat Jaipuri	Suresh Wadkar
Heer Ranjha	"Rab Ne Banaya Tujhe Mere Liye Mujhe Tere Liye"	Laxmikant Pyarelal	Anand Bakshi	
Saatwan Aasman	"Dhire Chal Dhire Dhire"	Raamlaxman	Suraj Sanim	
Saatwan Aasman	"Sadiyo Se Mai Soti Hu"	Raamlaxman	Suraj Sanim	Udit Narayan
Saatwan Aasman	"Tum Kya Mile Jaaneja"	Raamlaxman	Suraj Sanim	Udit Narayan
I Love You	"Sunday Ko Bulaya"	Raamlaxman		S.P. Balasubrahmanyam
I Love You	"Tu Mere Aage"	Raamlaxman		S.P. Balasubrahmanyam
I Love You	"Kash Koi Meri Ninde"	Raamlaxman		
Mehboob Mere Mehboob	"Dupatta Mera Malmal Ka"	Raamlaxman	Dev Kohli	
Vansh	"Main Toh Diwani Hui, Sapnon Ki Rani Hui"	Anand Milind	Sameer	Suresh Wadkar
Vansh	"Yeh Bindiya, Yeh Kajra, Karey Kya Isharey"	Anand Milind	Sameer	
Vansh	"Aakey Teri Bahon Mein, Har Shyam Lagey Sindoori"	Anand Milind	Sameer	S. P. Balasubrahmanyam
Dil Hi To Hai	"Meri Choodiyan Baje"	Laxmikant Pyarelal	Anand Bakshi	
Police Aur Mujrim	"Pyar Mein Sauda Nahin"	Bappi Lahiri	Anjaan	
Pyaar Ka Tarana	"Pyaar Ka Taraana"	Raamlaxman	M. G. Hashmat	
Pyaar Ka Tarana	"Kitna Accha Hota"	Raamlaxman	M. G. Hashmat	
Pyaar Ka Tarana	"Tumse Jo Kahoongi"	Raamlaxman	M. G. Hashmat	Udit Narayan
Naya Sawan	"Pyar Agar Tum Karte Ho"	Bappi Lahiri	Indeevar	Kumar Sanu
Naya Sawan	"Sare Ga Re Milke"	Bappi Lahiri	Anjaan	
Naya Sawan	"Naya Sawan Aayega"	Bappi Lahiri	Anjaan	

==== 1993 ====
Film	Song	Composer(s)	Writer(s)	Co-artist(s)
Darr	"Tu Mere Saamne"	Shiv–Hari	Anand Bakshi	Udit Narayan
Darr	"Darwaja Band Karlo"	Shiv–Hari	Anand Bakshi	Abhijeet Bhattacharya
Darr	"Ishq Da Rog"	Shiv–Hari	Anand Bakshi	Vinod Rathod
Darr	"Solah Button"	Shiv–Hari	Anand Bakshi	Kavita Krishnamurthy, Pamela Chopra
Darr	"Likha Hai Yeh"	Shiv–Hari	Anand Bakshi	Hariharan
Professor Ki Padosan	"Mile Jhumke Milan Rut Aayi"	R D Burman		Anup Jalota
Maya Memsaab	"Yeh Maya Hai"	Hridaynath Mangeshkar	Gulzar	
Maya Memsaab	"Chhaayaa Jaagi"	Hridaynath Mangeshkar	Gulzar	
Maya Memsaab	"Ek Hasin Nigah Ka"	Hridaynath Mangeshkar	Gulzar	
Maya Memsaab	"Iss Dil Me Bas Kar"	Hridaynath Mangeshkar	Gulzar	
Maya Memsaab	"Khud Se Baate Karte Rehana"	Hridaynath Mangeshkar	Gulzar	
Maya Memsaab	"Mere Sirhane Jalao Sapne"	Hridaynath Mangeshkar	Gulzar	
Maya Memsaab	"O Dil Banjaare Jaa Re"	Hridaynath Mangeshkar	Gulzar	
Aaina	"Dil Ne Dil Se Kya Kahan"	Dilip Sen, Sameer Sen		Nitin Mukesh
Aaina	"Goriya Re Goriya"	Dilip Sen, Sameer Sen		Jolly Mukherjee
Aaina	"Yeh Raat Khushnaseeb Hai"	Dilip Sen, Sameer Sen		
Aaina	"Aaina Hai Mera Chehra"	Dilip Sen, Sameer Sen		Suresh Wadkar, Asha Bhosle
Dil Ki Baazi	"Tum Saaz Chedo Mai Geet Gau"	Vijay Patil		
Dil Ki Baazi	"Ruk Bhi Jao Jana Dil Ko Na Tadhpana"	Vijay Patil		Udit Narayan
Dil Ki Baazi	"Ye Badal Aasman Pe Kyo"	Vijay Patil		S.P. Balasubrahmanyam
Nargis	"Dono Ke Dil Hai"	Basu Chakravarty	Majrooh Sultanpuri	Jagjit Singh
Nargis	"Kisi Aashiyane Mein"	Basu Chakravarty	Majrooh Sultanpuri	
Lootere	"O Lootere O Lootere"	Anand Milind		Manhar Udhas
Lootere	"Ae Sawan Baras Zara"	Anand Milind		Suresh Wadkar
Antim Nyay	"Kal Tumse Aakar Kaha"	Vijay Patil		S P Balasubrahmanyam
Antim Nyay	"Para Hat Soniye"	Vijay Patil		S P Balasubrahmanyam
Antim Nyay	Kaise Janu Mai Manu	Vijay Patil		S P Balasubrahmanyam
King Uncle	"Is Jahan Ki Nahin Hain"	Rajesh Roshan		Nitin Mukesh
Rudaali	"Jhuthi Muthi Mitawa"	Bhupen Hazarika	Gulzar	Bhupen Hazarika
Rudaali	"Samay O Dheere Chalo"	Bhupen Hazarika	Gulzar	Bhupen Hazarika, Asha Bhosle
Rudaali	"Maula Ho Maula"	Bhupen Hazarika	Gulzar	
Rudaali	"Dil Huun Huun Kare"	Bhupen Hazarika	Gulzar	Bhupen Hazarika
Parampara	"Aadhi Raat Ko"	Shiv–Hari		Amit Kumar
Parampara	"Hum Banjare Dil Nahi Lete Dil Nahi Dete"	Shiv–Hari		Devaki Pandit
Parampara	"Tu Sawan Mai Pyas Piya"	Shiv–Hari		
Parampara	"Mere Sathiya Mere Sath Chal Aisa Na Ho Jaye"	Shiv–Hari		Abhijeet
Parampara	"Mangti Hai Pyasi Dharti"	Shiv–Hari		
Parampara	"Phoolon Ke Is Sehar Mein Kaanton Se Darne Lage"	Shiv–Hari		Abhijeet
Teri Payal Mere Geet	"Kya Kahe Aaj Kya Ho Gaya"	Naushad	Hasan Kamal	
Teri Payal Mere Geet	"Mohabbat Ka Ek Devta"	Naushad	Hasan Kamal	
Teri Payal Mere Geet	"Duniya Ke Mele Mein"	Naushad	Hasan Kamal	
Kshatriya	"Dil Na Kisi Ka Jaye"	Laxmikant Pyarelal	Anand Bakshi	Kavita Krishnamurthy

==== 1994 ====
Film	Song	Composer(s)	Writer(s)	Co-artist(s)
1942: A Love Story	"Kuch Na Kaho"	R D Burman	Javed Akhtar	Kumar Sanu
Yeh Dillagi	"Dekho Zara Dekho"	Dilip Sen, Sameer Sen		Kumar Sanu
Yeh Dillagi	"Gori Kalai"	Dilip Sen, Sameer Sen		Udit Narayan
Yeh Dillagi	"Honton Pe Bas"	Dilip Sen, Sameer Sen		Kumar Sanu
Yeh Dillagi	"Lagi Lagi Dil Ki Lagi"	Dilip Sen, Sameer Sen		Udit Narayan, Abhijeet Bhattacharya
Yeh Dillagi	"Naam Kya Hai"	Dilip Sen, Sameer Sen		Kumar Sanu
Anokha Premyudh	"Dil Dhadke Tere Liye"			S. P. Balasubrahmanyam
Anokha Premyudh	"Saajan Mera Tera Pyar Ho Amar"			S. P. Balasubrahmanyam
Hum Aapke Hain Kaun...!	"Maye Ni Maye"	Raamlaxman	Asad Bhopali	
Hum Aapke Hain Kaun...!	"Didi Tera Devar Deewana"	Raamlaxman	Asad Bhopali	S. P. Balasubrahmanyam
Hum Aapke Hain Kaun...!	"Ye Mausam Ka Jaadu"	Raamlaxman	Asad Bhopali	S. P. Balasubrahmanyam
Hum Aapke Hain Kaun...!	"Chocolate Lime Juice"	Raamlaxman	Asad Bhopali	
Hum Aapke Hain Kaun...!	"Joote Dedo, Paise Lelo"	Raamlaxman	Asad Bhopali	S. P. Balasubrahmanyam
Hum Aapke Hain Kaun...!	"Mujhse Juda Hokar"	Raamlaxman	Asad Bhopali	S. P. Balasubrahmanyam
Hum Aapke Hain Kaun...!	"Aaj Hamaare Dil Mein"	Raamlaxman	Asad Bhopali	Kumar Sanu
Hum Aapke Hain Kaun...!	"Hum Aapke Hain Koun"	Raamlaxman	Asad Bhopali	S. P. Balasubrahmanyam
Hum Aapke Hain Kaun...!	"Wah Wah Ramji"	Raamlaxman	Asad Bhopali	S. P. Balasubrahmanyam
Hum Aapke Hain Kaun...!	"Lo Chali Main"	Raamlaxman	Asad Bhopali	
Hum Aapke Hain Kaun...!	"Dhiktana" (part 2)	Raamlaxman	Asad Bhopali	S. P. Balasubrahmanyam, Udit Narayan, Shailendra Singh
Chaand Kaa Tukdaa	"Dil Deewana Dhoond"	Mahesh–Kishor	Saawan Kumar Tak	Vipin Sachdeva
Chaand Kaa Tukdaa	"I Am Very Very Sorry"	Mahesh–Kishor	Saawan Kumar Tak	Vipin Sachdeva
Chaand Kaa Tukdaa	"Aaj Radha Ko Shyam"	Mahesh–Kishor	Saawan Kumar Tak	
Kanoon	"Kya Khata Hai Meri Kyu"	Vijay Patil		Kumar Sanu
Kanoon	"Mai Bani Hu Sirf Tere Liye"	Vijay Patil		Kumar Sanu
Kanoon	"Jack & Jill Went Up The Hill"	Vijay Patil		Kumar Sanu
Kanoon	"Tujhe Lift Car Me De Du"	Vijay Patil		Kumar Sanu
Kanoon	"Balma Arzi Meri"	Vijay Patil		
Kanoon	"Mere Dil Pe Kiye Hai Jo"	Vijay Patil		S. P. Balu
Insaniyat	"Main Naseeb Hoon"	Rajesh Roshan		Anwar
Jaan-e-Tamanna	"Ek Dil Ek Dil"	Aadesh Shrivastava		Udit Narayan
Jaan-e-Tamanna	"Suniye Ji"	Aadesh Shrivastava		Kumar Sanu
Jaan-e-Tamanna	"Mujhe Ladi Prem Dhun"	Aadesh Shrivastava		Roop Kumar Rathod
Prem Shakti	"O Raama Ho"	Vijay Patil	Dev Kohli, Ravindra Rawal	
Prem Shakti	"Tumako Dekha Hai Aksar Khaab Mein"	Vijay Patil	Dev Kohli, Ravindra Rawal	Udit Narayan
Prem Shakti	"Krishna Ki Hai Karishma Tu"	Vijay Patil	Dev Kohli, Ravindra Rawal	Udit Narayan
Prem Shakti	"Dil Karata Hai Dur Chale Kahin"	Vijay Patil	Dev Kohli, Ravindra Rawal	Udit Narayan
Elaan	"Naino Ko Baaten Karne Do"	Shyam Surender		Kumar Sanu

==== 1995 ====
Film	Song	Composer(s)	Writer(s)	Co-artist(s)
Dilwale Dulhaniya Le Jayenge	"Mere Khwabon Main"	Jatin–Lalit	Anand Bakshi	
Dilwale Dulhaniya Le Jayenge	"Ho Gaya Hai Tujhko"	Jatin–Lalit	Anand Bakshi	Udit Narayan
Dilwale Dulhaniya Le Jayenge	"Mehndi Laga Ke Rakhna"	Jatin–Lalit	Anand Bakshi	Udit Narayan
Dilwale Dulhaniya Le Jayenge	"Tujhe Dekha To"	Jatin–Lalit	Anand Bakshi	Kumar Sanu
Guddu	"Mere To Radheshyam"	Naushad	Majrooh Sultanpuri	
Sanam Harjai	Mein Kiya Hai Tumpe	Usha Khanna		
Karan Arjun	"Ek Munda Meri Umar Da"	Rajesh Roshan		

==== 1996 ====
Film	Song	Composer(s)	Writer(s)	Co-artist(s)
Maachis	"Tum Gaye"	Vishal Bhardwaj	Gulzar	Sanjeev Abhyankar
Maachis	"Yaad Na Aaye Koi"	Vishal Bhardwaj	Gulzar	
Maachis	"Aey Hawaa"	Vishal Bhardwaj	Gulzar	
Maachis	"Pani Pani Re"	Vishal Bhardwaj	Gulzar	
Maachis	"Bhej Kahaar"	Vishal Bhardwaj	Gulzar	
Prem Granth	"Main Kamjor Aurat"	Laxmikant Pyarelal		
Vishwasghaat	"Intezar Hai Tera"	Shyam Surender		
Vishwasghaat	"Deeangi Ye Jo Hai"	Shyam Surender		Kumar Sanu
Vishwasghaat	"Yeh Dil Ku Dhadkta Hai"	Shyam Surender		Kumar Sanu
Vishwasghaat	"Janeman Janeja"	Shyam Surender		Kumar Sanu
Megha	"Kuch Log Jeeti Baazi"	Vijay Patil		
Megha	"Baja Ke Bansi"	Vijay Patil		Nitin Mukesh

==== 1997 ====
Film	Song	Composer(s)	Writer(s)	Co-artist(s)
Dil To Pagal Hai	"Dil To Pagal Hai"	Uttam Singh	Anand Bakshi	Udit Narayan
Dil To Pagal Hai	"Are Re Are"	Uttam Singh	Anand Bakshi	Udit Narayan
Dil To Pagal Hai	"Are Re Are" (part 2)	Uttam Singh	Anand Bakshi	Udit Narayan
Dil To Pagal Hai	"Bholi Si Surat"	Uttam Singh	Anand Bakshi	Udit Narayan
Dil To Pagal Hai	"Dholna"	Uttam Singh	Anand Bakshi	Udit Narayan
Dil To Pagal Hai	"Pyaar Kar"	Uttam Singh	Anand Bakshi	Udit Narayan
Dil To Pagal Hai	"Koi Ladki Hai"	Uttam Singh	Anand Bakshi	Udit Narayan
Dil To Pagal Hai	"Ek Dujhe Ke Vaaste"	Uttam Singh	Anand Bakshi	Hariharan
Salma Pe Dil Aa Gaya	"Phul Mai Bheju Dil"	Aadesh Shrivastava	Saawan Kumar Tak	Kumar Sanu
Salma Pe Dil Aa Gaya	"Mere Paaon Mein"	Aadesh Shrivastava	Saawan Kumar Tak	Kumar Sanu
Betaabi	"Tum Mere Ho"	Vishal Bhardwaj		Suresh Wadkar
Betaabi	"Tum Mere Ho" (female version)	Vishal Bhardwaj		
Lav Kush	"Pativrata Siya Purushottam Shri Ram"	Vijay Patil	Dev Kohli	Asha Bhosle
Lav Kush	"Varnan Kare Kya Maiya Shri Ram Ji Ki Shobha"	Vijay Patil	Dev Kohli	Asha Bhosle
Lav Kush	"Suno Suno Mere Bhai Bandhu (Ramayan Ki Katha Suno)"	Vijay Patil	Dev Kohli	Asha Bhosle
Lav Kush	"Jai Jai Ram Siyaram (Pitha Vachan Ka Palan Karne)"	Vijay Patil	Dev Kohli	Suresh Wadkar
Lav Kush	"Katha Yeh Ram Ki"	Vijay Patil	Dev Kohli	Asha Bhosle
Lav Kush	"Nanha Munna Aayega"	Vijay Patil	Dev Kohli	Asha Bhosle, Usha Mangeshkar
Lav Kush	"Barson Ka Rinn Chukaane Aayi Pranay Ki Raina"	Vijay Patil	Dev Kohli	S. P. Balasubrahmanyam

==== 1998 ====
Film	Song	Composer(s)	Writer(s)	Co-artist(s)
Dil Se..	"Jiya Jale"	A.R. Rahman	Gulzar	M. G. Sreekumar
Satya	"Tu Mere Paas Bhi Hai"	Vishal Bhardwaj	Gulzar	Hariharan
Satya	"Geela Geela Pani"	Vishal Bhardwaj	Gulzar	
Dushman	"Aawaz Do Hamko"	Uttam Singh		Udit Narayan
Dushman	"Aawaz Do Hamko" (sad version)	Uttam Singh		Udit Narayan
Dushman	"Pyar Ko Ho Jane Do"	Uttam Singh		Kumar Sanu
Jab Pyaar Kisise Hota Hai	"Pehli Pehli Bar Jab Pyaar"	Jatin–Lalit	Anand Bakshi	Kumar Sanu
Jab Pyaar Kisise Hota Hai	"Is Dil Mein Kya Hai"	Jatin–Lalit	Anand Bakshi	Udit Narayan
Jab Pyaar Kisise Hota Hai	"Madhosh Dil Ki Dhadkan"	Jatin–Lalit	Anand Bakshi	Kumar Sanu
Jab Pyaar Kisise Hota Hai	"O Jaana Na Jaana"	Jatin–Lalit	Anand Bakshi	Kumar Sanu
Jab Pyaar Kisise Hota Hai	"O Jaana Yeh Maana"	Jatin–Lalit	Anand Bakshi	Kumar Sanu
Sham Ghansham	"Tum Dono Ho Ek Se"	Vishal Bhardwaj	Anand Bakshi	Hariharan, Suresh Wadkar
Sham Ghansham	"Ma Ki Mamta"	Vishal Bhardwaj	Anand Bakshi	Hariharan, Suresh Wadkar

==== 1999 ====
Film	Song	Composer(s)	Writer(s)	Co-artist(s)
Hum Tum Pe Marte Hain	"Hum Tum Pe Marte Hain"	Uttam Singh	Anand Bakshi	Udit Narayan
Hum Tum Pe Marte Hain	"Pyar Mein Door Kya"	Uttam Singh	Anand Bakshi	Udit Narayan
Hu Tu Tu	"Chai Chappa Chai"	Vishal Bhardwaj	Gulzar	Hariharan
Hu Tu Tu	"Itna Lamba Kash Lo Yaaron"	Vishal Bhardwaj	Gulzar	Hariharan
Hu Tu Tu	"Ye Num Ankhe"	Vishal Bhardwaj	Gulzar	
Dulhan Banoo Main Teri	"Rabba Tera Main Shuqar Manaoon"	Vijay Patil		Udit Narayan, Vinod Rathod
Godmother	"Matee Re Matee Re"	Vishal Bhardwaj	Javed Akhtar	
Manchala	"Ghadi Se Kaho"	Vijay Patil	Ravainder Rawal	Kumaar Sanu
Jaha Tum Le Chalo	"Shauq Khwab Ka Hai"	Vishal Bhardwaj	Gulzar	
Kachche Dhaage	"Upar Khuda Asman Neeche"	Nusrat Fateh Ali Khan	Anand Bakshi	
Kachche Dhaage	"Dil Pardesi Hogaya"	Nusrat Fateh Ali Khan	Anand Bakshi	Kumar Sanu
Kachche Dhaage	"Band Lifafa Dil Hai"	Nusrat Fateh Ali Khan	Anand Bakshi	Kumar Sanu

=== 2000s–2020s ===
==== 2000 ====
Film	Song	Composer(s)	Writer(s)	Co-artist(s)
Pukar	"Ek Tu Hi Bharosa"	A.R. Rahman	Majrooh, Javed Akhtar	
Zubeidaa	"So Gaye Hain"	A.R. Rahman	Javed Akhtar	
Zubeidaa	"So Gaye Hain" (part 2)	A.R. Rahman	Javed Akhtar	
Zubeidaa	"Pyaara Sa Gaon"	A.R. Rahman	Javed Akhtar	
Mohabbatein	"Humko Humise Chura Lo"	Jatin–Lalit	Anand Bakshi	Udit Narayan
Mohabbatein	"Aankhein Khuli"	Jatin–Lalit	Anand Bakshi	Udit Narayan, Shweta Pandit, Sonali Bhatawdekar, Pritha Mazumdar, Udhbav, Manohar Shetty, Shahrukh Khan & Ishaan
Mohabbatein	"Zinda Rehti Hain Mohabbatein"	Jatin–Lalit	Anand Bakshi	Udit Narayan

==== 2001 ====
Film	Song	Composer(s)	Writer(s)	Co-artist(s)
Uljhan	"Pehli Nazar Mein"	Aadesh Shrivastav	Madan Pal	
Uljhan	"Tune Ek Pal Ke Liye"	Aadesh Shrivastav	Madan Pal	Udit Narayan
Censor	"Mere Dil Mein Tum"	Jatin–Lalit		
Lagaan	"O Paalanhaare"	A.R. Rahman	Javed Akhtar	Sadhana Sargam, Udit Narayan
Lajja	"Kaun Dagar Kaun Shehar"	Ilayaraaja	Prasoon Joshi	
One 2 Ka 4	"Khamoshiyan Gungunane Lagi" (part 1)	A. R. Rahman	Mehboob	Sonu Nigam
One 2 Ka 4	"Khamoshiyan Gungunane Lagi" (part 2)	A. R. Rahman	Mehboob	Sonu Nigam
Kabhi Khushi Kabhie Gham	"Kabhi Khushi Kabhie Gham"	Jatin–Lalit, Sandesh Shandilya and Aadesh Shrivastava	Sameer	
Kabhi Khushi Kabhie Gham	"Kabhi Khushi Kabhie Gham" (sad version)	Jatin–Lalit, Sandesh Shandilya and Aadesh Shrivastava	Sameer	

==== 2002 ====
Film	Song	Composer(s)	Writer(s)	Co-artist(s)
Mujhse Dosti Karoge	"Andekhi Anjaani"	Rahul Sharma		Udit Narayan
Mujhse Dosti Karoge	"Jaane Dil Mein"	Rahul Sharma		Sonu Nigam
Mujhse Dosti Karoge	"Jaane Dil Mein" (part 2)	Rahul Sharma		Sonu Nigam
Mujhse Dosti Karoge	"The Medley"			Udit Narayan, Sonu Nigam, Pamela Chopra
Lal Salaam	"Humkara Jaage"	Hridaynath Mangeshkar	Gulzar	
Lal Salaam	"Chaand Gufa Mein"	Hridaynath Mangeshkar	Gulzar	
Lal Salaam	"Mitwa Lai Jaiyyo"	Hridaynath Mangeshkar	Gulzar	Roop Kumar Rathod
Lal Salaam	"Beeta Mausam"	Hridaynath Mangeshkar	Gulzar	Roop Kumar Rathod

==== 2004 ====
Film	Song	Composer(s)	Writer(s)	Co-artist(s)
Veer-Zaara	"Tere Liye"	Madan Mohan	Javed Akhtar	Roop Kumar Rathod
Veer-Zaara	"Aisa Des Hai Mera"	Madan Mohan	Javed Akhtar	Udit Narayan, Gurdas Mann, Pritha Mazumder
Veer-Zaara	"Yeh Hum Aa Gaye Hain Kahan"	Madan Mohan	Javed Akhtar	Udit Narayan
Veer-Zaara	"Do Pal"	Madan Mohan	Javed Akhtar	Sonu Nigam
Veer-Zaara	"Kyun Hawa"	Madan Mohan	Javed Akhtar	Sonu Nigam
Veer-Zaara	"Hum To Bhai Jaise"	Madan Mohan	Javed Akhtar	
Veer-Zaara	"Lodi (Veer-Zaara)"	Madan Mohan	Javed Akhtar	Udit Narayan, Gurdas Mann
Veer-Zaara	"Tum Paas Aa Raahein Ho" (not included in film)	Madan Mohan	Javed Akhtar	Jagjit Singh
Veer-Zaara	"Jaane Kyun Khwaabon Ka" (not included in film)	Madan Mohan	Javed Akhtar	

==== 2005 ====
Film	Song	Composer(s)	Writer(s)	Co-artist(s)
Bewafaa	"Kaise Piya Se"	Nadeem–Shravan	Sameer	
Lucky: No Time for Love	"Shayad Yahi To Pyar Hai"	Adnan Sami	Sameer	Adnan Sami
Page 3	"Kitne Ajeeb Rishte Hai Yaha Pe"	Shamir Tandon	Sandeep Nath	

==== 2006 ====
Film	Song	Composer(s)	Writer(s)	Co-artist(s)
Rang De Basanti	"Lukka Chuppi"	A. R. Rahman	Prasoon Joshi	A. R. Rahman

==== 2007 ====
Film	Song	Composer(s)	Writer(s)	Co-artist(s)
Strangers	"Jaane Thi Kaisi Raahon Mein"	Vinay Tiwari		

==== 2009–2019 ====
Film	Song	Composer(s)	Writer(s)	Co-artist(s)
Jail	"Daata Sun Le"	Shamir Tandon	Ajaykumar Garg	
Jail	"Daata Sun Le" (Contemporary Remix)	Shamir Tandon	Ajaykumar Garg	
Mere Husband Ki Biwi	"Gori Hai Kalaiyan"	IP Singh		

== Hindi non-film songs ==
Year	Album/Single	Song	Music Director(s)	Lyrics	Co-singer(s)
N/A	Single	"Hum Kho Gaye"	Salil Chowdhury		solo
N/A	Single	"Saare Jahan Se Accha"	Ravi Shankar	Muhammad Iqbal	solo
1954	Umangon Ko Sakhi	"Umangon Ko Sakhi"	Naushad	Shakeel Badayuni	solo
1957	Vrindavan Ka Krishna Kanhaiya	"Vrindavan Ka Krishna Kanhaiya"	various	various	Mohammed Rafi
1957	Vrindavan Ka Krishna Kanhaiya	"Sakhi Ri Sun Bole Papeeha"	various	various	Asha Bhosle
1958	Salaami	"Jivace Pakharu Khudkan Hastay"	Ram Kadam	P. Savlaram	solo
1963	Single	"Ae mere watan ke logon"	C. Ramchandra	Kavi Pradeep	solo
1991	Sajda: An Offering of Ghazals	"Dard Se Mera Daaman"	Jagjit Singh		
1991	Sajda: An Offering of Ghazals	"Tujhse Milne Ki Saza Denge"	Jagjit Singh		Jagjit Singh
1991	Sajda: An Offering of Ghazals	"Gham Ka Khazana Tera"	Jagjit Singh		Jagjit Singh
1991	Sajda: An Offering of Ghazals	"Kisko Qatil Main Kahoon"	Jagjit Singh		Jagjit Singh
1991	Sajda: An Offering of Ghazals	"Dil Mein Ab Dard-e-Mohabbat"	Jagjit Singh		
1991	Sajda: An Offering of Ghazals	"Har Taraf Har Jagah"	Jagjit Singh		Jagjit Singh
1991	Sajda: An Offering of Ghazals	"Aankh Se Door Na Ho"	Jagjit Singh		
1991	Sajda: An Offering of Ghazals	"Meri Tasveer Mein Rang"	Jagjit Singh		
1991	Sajda: An Offering of Ghazals	"Mausam Ko Isharon Se Bula"	Jagjit Singh		Jagjit Singh
1991	Sajda: An Offering of Ghazals	"Allah Jaanta Hai"	Jagjit Singh		Jagjit Singh
1991	Sajda: An Offering of Ghazals	"Dhuan Banake Fiza Mein Uda"	Jagjit Singh		
1991	Sajda: An Offering of Ghazals	"Mili Hawaon Mein Udne"	Jagjit Singh		Jagjit Singh
1991	Sajda: An Offering of Ghazals	"Tere Jalwe AB Mujhe"	Jagjit Singh		
1991	Sajda: An Offering of Ghazals	"Dhoop Mein Niklo Ghataon"	Jagjit Singh		Jagjit Singh
1992	Sharddhanjali A Tribute To Immortal	"Soja Rajkumari"	Anil Mohle		
1992	Sharddhanjali A Tribute To Immortal	"Mein Kiya Jano Kiya" (tribute to K.L. Saigal)	Anil Mohle		
1992	Sharddhanjali A Tribute To Immortal	"Nain Heen Ko Raah" (tribute to K.L. Saigal)	Anil Mohle		
1992	Sharddhanjali A Tribute To Immortal	"Piya Milan Ko Jana" (tribute to Pankaj Mullick)	Anil Mohle		
1992	Sharddhanjali A Tribute To Immortal	"Yeh Raaten Yeh Mausam"	Anil Mohle		
1992	Sharddhanjali A Tribute To Immortal	"Kabhi Khud Pe"	Anil Mohle		
1992	Sharddhanjali A Tribute To Immortal	"Din Dhal Jaye"	Anil Mohle		
1992	Sharddhanjali A Tribute To Immortal	"Man Re Tu Kahe"	Anil Mohle		
1992	Sharddhanjali A Tribute To Immortal	"Jaon Kha Bata "	Anil Mohle		
1992	Sharddhanjali A Tribute To Immortal	"Anso Bhari Hai"	Anil Mohle		
1992	Sharddhanjali A Tribute To Immortal	"Kahin Door Jab"	Anil Mohle		
1992	Sharddhanjali A Tribute To Immortal	"Tum Pukar Lo"	Anil Mohle		
1992	Sharddhanjali A Tribute To Immortal	"Yeh Nayan Dare"	Anil Mohle		
1992	Sharddhanjali A Tribute To Immortal	"Teri Duniya Mein"	Anil Mohle		
1992	Sharddhanjali A Tribute To Immortal	"O Mere Dil Ke"	Anil Mohle		
1992	Sharddhanjali A Tribute To Immortal	"Yeh Jeevan Hai"	Anil Mohle		
1992	Sharddhanjali A Tribute To Immortal	"Wo Sham Kuch"	Anil Mohle		
1993	The Melody of Love (Album)	"Tumse Jo Kahungi"	Vijay Patil		Udit Narayan
1993	The Melody of Love (Album)	"Pyar Ka Taraana"	Vijay Patil		
1993	The Melody of Love (Album)	"Kitnaa Achha Hota"	Vijay Patil		
1995	Sharddhanjali A Tribute To Immortal 2	"Aye Chand Chup Najana"	Anil Mohle		
1995	Sharddhanjali A Tribute To Immortal 2	"Toofan Mail"	Anil Mohle		
1995	Sharddhanjali A Tribute To Immortal 2	"Paphiha Re"	Anil Mohle		
1995	Sharddhanjali A Tribute To Immortal 2	"Ankhiyan Milake"	Anil Mohle		
1995	Sharddhanjali A Tribute To Immortal 2	"Dheere Dheere Are Badal"	Anil Mohle		
1995	Sharddhanjali A Tribute To Immortal 2	"Waqt Nai Kiya"	Anil Mohle		
1995	Sharddhanjali A Tribute To Immortal 2	"Koi Door Sai Awaz"	Anil Mohle		
1995	Sharddhanjali A Tribute To Immortal 2	"Kese Koi Jiye"	Anil Mohle		
1995	Sharddhanjali A Tribute To Immortal 2	"Koi Humdum Na Raha"	Anil Mohle		
1995	Sharddhanjali A Tribute To Immortal 2	"Koi Lautade Mere"	Anil Mohle		
1995	Sharddhanjali A Tribute To Immortal 2	"Rulakar Chal Diye"	Anil Mohle		
1995	Sharddhanjali A Tribute To Immortal 2	"Chal Ri Sajni"	Anil Mohle		
1995	Sharddhanjali A Tribute To Immortal 2	"Bhuli Hui Yaado"	Anil Mohle		
1995	Sharddhanjali A Tribute To Immortal 2	"Suhani Raat"	Anil Mohle		
1995	Sharddhanjali A Tribute To Immortal 2	"Dil Ka Bhanwar"	Anil Mohle		
1995	Sharddhanjali A Tribute To Immortal 2	"Tere Mandir Ka"	Anil Mohle		
1995	Sharddhanjali A Tribute To Immortal 2	"Yaad Aye Ke Na"	Anil Mohle		
1995	Sharddhanjali A Tribute To Immortal 2	"Balam Aye"	Anil Mohle		
1995	Sharddhanjali A Tribute To Immortal 2	"Do Naina Matware"	Anil Mohle		
1995	Sharddhanjali A Tribute To Immortal 2	"Ab Mein Kya Kaho"	Anil Mohle		
1995	Sharddhanjali A Tribute To Immortal 2	"Sapt Suran Teen Gram"	Anil Mohle		
	Timeless Jagjit (Album)	"Tera Chehra Hai Aaeene Jaisa"			Asha Bhosle, Chitra Singh, Jagjit Singh
2019	Single	"Saugandh Mujhe Is Mitti Ki"	Mayuresh Pai	Prasoon Joshi	solo

== Marathi songs ==
Year	Film	Song	Composer(s)	Writer(s)	Co-artist(s)
1950	Ram Ram Pahuna	"Shapath Dudhachi"	Lata Mangeshkar	P. Savalaram	Solo
1950	Ram Ram Pahuna	"Tu Gupit Kunala Sangoo Nako"	Lata Mangeshkar	P. Savalaram	Solo
1950	Ram Ram Pahuna	"Pahuna Mhanoni Aala"	Lata Mangeshkar	P. Savalaram	Solo
1950	Ram Ram Pahuna	"Aale Vayat Me"	Lata Mangeshkar	P. Savalaram	Solo
1951	Amar Bhoopali	"Ghanashyam Sundara Shridhara"	Vasant Desai	Shahir Honaji Bala	Panditrao Nagarkar
1951	Amar Bhoopali	"Ghadi Ghadi Are Manmohana"	Vasant Desai	Shahir Honaji Bala	Panditrao Nagarkar
1951	Amar Bhoopali	"Tujhya Preetiche Dukhh Mala Daau Nako Re"	Vasant Desai	Shahir Honaji Bala	solo
1951	Amar Bhoopali	"Latpat Latpat Tujha Chaalan Ga"	Vasant Desai	Shahir Honaji Bala	solo
1951	Amar Bhoopali	"Tujhi Majhi Preet"	Vasant Desai	Shahir Honaji Bala	solo
1951	Amar Bhoopali	"Nako Door Deshi Javoo"	Vasant Desai	Shahir Honaji Bala	solo
1952	Chhatrapati Shivaji	"Aaj Shivaji Raja Zala"	C. Ramchandra	P. Savalaram	
1952	Chhatrapati Shivaji	"Gavat Gaav Maaza"	C. Ramchandra	P. Savalaram	
1952	Chhatrapati Shivaji	"Satjanmicha Son Paule"	C. Ramchandra	P. Savalaram	
1952	Chhatrapati Shivaji	"Vajat Danka"	C. Ramchandra	P. Savalaram	
1952	Chhatrapati Shivaji	"Kuni Govind Ghya"	C. Ramchandra	P. Savalaram	
1954	Maharani Yesubai	"Keli Mi Chafyachi Re"	Sudhir Phadke	G. D. Madgulkar	
1960	Kanyadaan	"Lek Ladki Hya Gharchi"	Vasant Prabhu		Solo
1960	Kanyadaan	"Jay Devi Mangala Gauri"	Vasant Prabhu		
1960	Kanyadaan	"Kokil Kuhu Kuhu Bole"	Vasant Prabhu		
1960	Kanyadaan	"Tu Asta Tar"	Vasant Prabhu		
1960	Kanyadaan	"Majhiya Nayananchya Kondani"	Vasant Prabhu		
1963	Mohityanchi Manjula	"Bai Bai Man Moracha"	Anandghan	Jagdish Khebudkar	
1963	Mohityanchi Manjula	"Zala Sakharpuda"	Anandghan		
1963	Mohityanchi Manjula	"Nilya Aabhali"	Anandghan		
1963	Mohityanchi Manjula	"Son Sakali Sarja"	Anandghan	Shanta Shelke	
1964	Maratha Tituka Melvava	"Akhercha Tula Ha Dandvat"	Anandghan	Yogesh	
1964	Maratha Tituka Melvava	"Marathi Paaul Padte Pudhe"	Anandghan	Shanta Shelke	Usha Mangeshkar, Hridaynath Mangeshkar, Hemant Kumar
1965	Sadhi Mansa	"Airaneechya Deva Tula"	Anandghan	Jagdish Khebudkar	
1965	Sadhi Mansa	"Malachya Malamadhi"	Anandghan	Yogesh	
1965	Sadhi Mansa	"Vaat Pahuni Jeev Shinla"	Anandghan		
1965	Sadhi Mansa	"Rajachya Rang Mahalin"	Anandghan		
1965	Kamapurta Mama	"Jeevanat Hee Ghadi"	Yashwant Dev	Yashwant Dev	
1968	Jiwhala	"Ya Chimanyanno"	Shrinivas Khale	G. D. Madgulkar	
1969	Tambadi Mati	"Ja Ja Ranichya Pakhara"	Anandghan	Shanta Shelke	
1969	Tambadi Mati	"Magate Mann Ek Kahi"	Anandghan		
1969	Tambadi Mati	"Bhasma Vilepit"	Anandghan		
1969	Tambadi Mati	"Mazhya Kapalacha Kunku"	Anandghan	Yogesh	
1972	Pinjara	"De Re Kanha Choli Un Lugdi"	Ram Kadam	Jagdish Khebudkar	solo
1974	Samna	"Sakhya Re Ghaayaal Mee Harini"	Bhaskar M. Chandravarkar	Jagdish Khebudkar	
1977	Chaani	"Mai To Jaungi Jaungi Re Us Paar"	Hridaynath Mangeshkar	Aarti Prabhu	solo
1977	Chaani	"Tumhi Ho Mere Apne Yaha"	Hridaynath Mangeshkar	Aarti Prabhu	solo
1977	Jait Re Jait	"Mee Raat Taakli"	Hridaynath Mangeshkar	Namdeo Dhondo Mahanor	Chandrakant Kale, Ravindra Sathe
1980	Sansar	"Vaara Gaai Gaane"	Hridaynath Mangeshkar	Jagdish Khebudkar	
1982	Umbartha	"Sunya Sunya Maifilit Majhya"	Hridaynath Mangeshkar	Vasant Bapat and Suresh Bhat	solo
1982	Umbartha	"Chand Matala Matala"		Vasant Bapat and Suresh Bhat	solo
1982	Umbartha	"Gagan Sadan Tejomay"		Vasant Bapat and Suresh Bhat	solo
1984	Mahananda	"Majye Rani Majye Moga"	Hridaynath Mangeshkar	N/A	Suresh Wadkar
1984	Mahananda	"Majho Lavtaay Dava Dola"	Hridaynath Mangeshkar	N/A	solo
1984	Mahananda	"Majhya Mukhar Garbha Chhaya"	Hridaynath Mangeshkar	N/A	solo
1987	Sarja	"Chimb Pavsan Raan Zhala Abadani"	Hridaynath Mangeshkar		Suresh Wadkar
1987	Sarja	"Mi Katyatun Chalun Thakle"	Hridaynath Mangeshkar		Suresh Wadkar
1987	Sarja	"Mohe Naihar Se Ab"	Hridaynath Mangeshkar		
1991	Balidaan	"Premium Ek Dayalu Udar Raja"	Anil Mohile		
1994	Majha Chakula	"Majha Chakula, Majha Sonula"	Anil Mohile	Pravin Davane	
2006	Shubh Mangal Savdhan	"Vitthala Vitthala"	Anil Mohile		

== Assamese songs ==
Year	Film	Song	Composer(s)	Writer(s)	Co-artist(s)
1956	Era Bator Sur	"Jonakore Rati"	Bhupen Hazarika	Bhupen Hazarika	
1971	Chayanika	"Godabori Noire Parore Pora"	Bhupen Hazarika	Bhupen Hazarika	
1988	Siraj	Kopi Uthe Kio Taj Mahal	Bhupen Hazarika	Bhupen Hazarika	
1995	Pani	"Moi Othai Jolodhir Majoloi"	Bhupen Hazarika	Bhupen Hazarika	

== Bengali songs ==
Year	Film	Song	Composer(s)	Writer(s)	Co-artist(s)
1956	Asamapta	"Purnima Noy E Je"	Nachiketa Ghosh		
1956	Asamapta	"Rimiki Jhimiki Chhonde"	Nachiketa Ghosh		
1956	Ek Din Raatre	"Jaago Mohono Preetom"	Salil Chowdhury		
1957	Kari O Komal	"Asta Akashe Boner Chita Jwale"			
1957	Kari O Komal	"Tir Bendha Pakhi"			
1958	Joutuk	"Ei Mon Bihongo"	Hemanta Mukherjee	Gauriprasanna Mazumdar	solo
1958	O Amar Desher Mati	"Phande Poriya Boga Kandey"	Hemanta Mukherjee		
1959	Deep Jwele Jai	"Aar Jeno Nei Kono Bhabna"	Hemanta Mukherjee	Gauriprasanna Mazumdar	
1960	Panka Tilak	"Andhar Majhe Tomar"			
1960	Panka Tilak	"E Tomay Kotha Niye"			
1965	Alor Pipasa	"Na Bajaiyo Shyam Bairi Bansuri"	Hemanta Mukherjee		
1965	Alor Pipasa	"Ghir Aayi Badariya"	Hemanta Mukherjee		
1965	Dolna	"Amar Kotha Shishir Dhowa"	Shailen Mukherjee	Pulak Banerjee	
1965	Monihar	"Ke Jeno Go Dekechhe Amay"	Hemanta Mukherjee	Pulak Banerjee	
1965	Monihar	"Nijhum Sandhyay Pantho Pakhira" (female)	Hemanta Mukherjee	Pulak Banerjee	
1965	Monihar	"Bodhua Ke Jeno Go"	Hemanta Mukherjee	Pulak Banerjee	
1965	Monihar	"Ashar Shrabon Mane Nato Mon"	Hemanta Mukherjee	Pulak Banerjee	
1965	Monihar	"Ke Jeno Go Dekechhe Amay" (duet)	Hemanta Mukherjee	Pulak Banerjee	Hemanta Mukherjee
1966	Shankhabela	"Ke Prothom Kache Esechi"	Sudhin Dasgupta	Pulak Banerjee	Manna Dey
1966	Shankhabela	"Aaj Mon Cheyeche"	Sudhin Dasgupta	Pulak Banerjee	
1967	Mon Niye	"Chole Jete Jete Din"	Hemanta Mukherjee	Mukul Dutt	
1968	Adwitiya	"Chonchol Moyuri E Raat"	Hemanta Mukherjee	Pulak Banerjee	
1968	Adwitiya	"Bolona Keno Je Tumi"	Hemanta Mukherjee	Pulak Banerjee	
1968	Adwitiya	"Jabar Bela Pichhu Theke"	Hemanta Mukherjee	Pulak Banerjee	
1968	Adwitiya	"Chonchol Mon Anmona Hoy"	Hemanta Mukherjee	Pulak Banerjee	Hemanta Mukherjee
1968	Baghini	"Jodio Rojoni Pohalo"	Hemanta Mukherjee	Mukul Dutt	
1971	Kuheli	"Tumi Robe Nirobe"	Rabindranath Tagore		Hemanta Mukherjee
1971	Kuheli	"Keno Ele"	Hemanta Mukherjee		
1971	Kuheli	"Ke Jege Achho"	Hemanta Mukherjee		
1971	Kuheli	"Eso Kache Eso"	Hemanta Mukherjee		
1971	Raktakto Bangla	"O Dadabhai Murti Banao"	Salil Chowdhury		solo
1972	Anindita	"Ore Mon Pakhi"	Hemanta Mukherjee	Mukul Dutt	
1972	Anindita	"Kemone Taribo Tara"	Hemanta Mukherjee	Traditional	
1973	Marjina Abdullah	"Hay Hayre Pran Jayre"			solo
1973	Sonar Khancha	"Ja Ja Ja Bhule Jaa"	Bireswar Sarkar	Bireswar Sarkar	solo
1973	Sonar Khancha	"Brishti Brishti Brishti"	Bireswar Sarkar	Bireswar Sarkar	solo
1975	Raag Anurag	"Oi Gachher Patay Roder Jhikimiki"	Hemanta Mukherjee	Pulak Banerjee	solo
1977	Kabita	"Bujhbe Na Keu"	Salil Chowdhury		
1977	Kabita	"Hothat Bhishon"	Salil Chowdhury		
1977	Proxy	"Tomader Asore Aaj"	Hemanta Mukherjee		solo
1979	Mother	"Ei Brishtite Bhije Mati"			Manna Dey
1979	Mother	"Hajar Tarar Aloy"			solo
1979	Mother	"Hotam Jodi Tota Pakhi"			solo
1978	Aradhana (dubbed)	"Madhobi Futeche Oi"	S. D. Burman	Gauriprasanna Mazumdar	Mohammad Rafi
1978	Aradhana (dubbed)	"Chondro Je Tui"	S. D. Burman	Gauriprasanna Mazumdar	solo
1978	Aradhana (dubbed)	"Aj Hridoye Bhalobeshe"	S. D. Burman	Gauriprasanna Mazumdar	Kishore Kumar
1981	Anusandhan	"Amar Shopno Je"	R. D. Burman	Gauriprasanna Mazumdar	Kishore Kumar
1981	Anusandhan	"Hay Re Pora Bashi"	R. D. Burman	Gauriprasanna Mazumdar	
1981	Anusandhan	"Otho Otho Shurjai Re"	R. D. Burman	Gauriprasanna Mazumdar	
1981	Kalankini Kankabati	"Na Na Kachhe Esho Na"	R. D. Burman	Gauriprasanna Mazumdar	
1983	Protidan	"Mongoldweep Jwele" (part 1)	Bappi Lahiri	Gauriprasanna Mazumdar	
1983	Roktoraag	"Tumi Je Amar"	Abhijeet Banerjee		
1984	Teen Murti	"Mon Churi Chhara Kaj Nei"	R D Burman		Kishore Kumar
1988	Dolon Chapa	"Amaroto Saadh Chhilo"	Kanu Bhattacharya		solo
1988	Poroshmoni	"Jay Je Bela"	Hemanta Mukherjee	Pulak Banerjee	solo
1988	Proteek	"Brishti Elo Brishti"	Bappi Lahiri	Mukul Dutta	solo
1988	Toofan	"Jotobar Dekhi Maago"			
1988	Toofan	"Jhoro Hawa Chhinnopata"			
1988	Tumi Koto Sundor	"Poth Bole Dao Mago"			
1989	Amar Tumi	"Bolchi Tomar Kane"	Bappi Lahiri	Pulak Banerjee	solo
1989	Mandanda	"Ami Jodi Hoi Ogo Chand"	Sapan Chakraborty		Amit Kumar
1989	Mandanda	"Jibon Koto Sundor" (female)	Sapan Chakraborty		solo
1989	Mandanda	"Jibon Koto Sundor" (duet)	Sapan Chakraborty		Bhupinder Singh
1989	Pronomi Tomay	"Ei Jogote Amra Achi" (female)	Bappi Lahiri	Pulak Banerjee	solo
1989	Pronomi Tomay	"Ei Jogote Amra Achi" (duet)	Bappi Lahiri	Pulak Banerjee	Bappi Lahiri
1989	Shatarupa	"Phele Asha Smriti Amar" (female)	R D Burman	Bhavesh Kundu	solo
1990	Lorai	"Apon Jara Tarai Amar"			solo
1990	Rajnartaki	"Sei Jodi Shopne Ele"	Bireswar Sarkar	Bireswar Sarkar	solo
1990	Rajnartaki	"Ami Aar Shopno Dekhbona"	Bireswar Sarkar	Bireswar Sarkar	solo
1990	Rajnartaki	"Hari Bol"	Bireswar Sarkar	Bireswar Sarkar	solo
1990	Mandira	"Sab Lal Pathor"	Bappi Lahiri		
1990	Mandira	"Sab Lal Pathor" (sad)	Bappi Lahiri		
1990	Manoshi	"Ei Raat Eto Tara"			
1990	Swarna Trishna	"O Amar Sajani"	Salil Chowdhury		Kishore Kumar
1991	Ahankar	"Bolechho Je Kotha"	R D Burman		
1991	Bourani	"Jeona Darao" (version 1)	R D Burman	R D Burman	solo
1991	Bourani	"Jeona Darao" (version 2)	R D Burman	R D Burman	solo
1991	Bourani	"Khushir Sagore Ami"	R D Burman	R D Burman	solo
1991	Nawab	"Amar Sonar Chokh"	R D Burman	Pulak Banerjee	solo
1991	Nawab	"Sarajibon Emni Kore" (version 1)	R D Burman	Pulak Banerjee	solo
1991	Nawab	"Sarajibon Emni Kore" (version 2)	R D Burman	Pulak Banerjee	chorus
1992	Shwet Patharer Thala	"Je Prodeep Jalchho Tumi"	Mukul Dutt		solo
1993	Shraddhanjali	"Buk Bhora Mor Kanna Diye"	Swapan Chakraborty, Anjan Chowdhury		solo

== Bengali Non-film songs ==
Year	Album/Single	Song	Composer(s)	Lyricist	Co-singer
1954	Single	Akash Prodeep Jole	Satinath Mukherjee		Solo
1958	Single	"Rongila Bashite Ke Dake"	Bhupen Hazarika		solo
1958	Single	"Na Jeona"	Salil Chowdhury		solo
1958	Single	"Jaa Re Hare Ure Jare Pakhi"	Salil Chowdhury		solo
1960	Single	"O Banshi Hay"	Salil Chowdhury		solo
1960	Single	"Ogo Aar Kichu To Nai"	Salil Chowdhury		solo
1961	Single	"Saat Bhai Chompa"	Salil Chowdhury		solo
1961	Single	"Ki Je Kori"	Salil Chowdhury		solo
1963	Single	"O Tui Noyono Pakhi"	Salil Chowdhury		solo
1963	Single	"Keno Kichhu Kotha Bolona"	Salil Chowdhury		solo
1967	Single	"Ke Jabi Aay"	Salil Chowdhury		solo
1967	Single	"Nishidin Nishin Baaje"	Salil Chowdhury		solo
1968	Single	"Jodi Baron Koro Tobe"	Salil Chowdhury		solo
1968	Single	"O Jhorjhor Jhorna"	Salil Chowdhury		solo
1969	Single	"Na Mono Lagena"	Salil Chowdhury		solo
1969	Single	"Ore O Mon Moyna"	Salil Chowdhury		solo
1970	Single	"De Dol Dol"	Hridaynath Mangeshkar	Salil Chowdhury	Hemanta Mukherjee
1970	Single	"Badol Kalo Ghirlo Go"	Hridaynath Mangeshkar	Salil Chowdhury	solo
1970	Single	"Ogo Maa Ganga"	Hridaynath Mangeshkar	Salil Chowdhury	solo
1971	Single	"O Projapati"	Salil Chowdhury		solo
1971	Single	"Pa Ma Ga Re Sa"	Salil Chowdhury		solo
1972	Single	"Ontobihin Kaate Na"	Salil Chowdhury		solo
1972	Single	"Kichhu To Chaini Ami"	Salil Chowdhury		solo
1975	Single	"Nao Go Maa Phool Nao"	Hridaynath Mangeshkar	Salil Chowdhury	solo
1975	Single	"Ei Din To Jabena"	Hridaynath Mangeshkar	Salil Chowdhury	solo
1975	Single	"Jhilik Jhilik Jhinuk"	Salil Chowdhury		solo
1975	Single	"O Mor Moyna Go"	Salil Chowdhury		solo
1977	Single	"Aaj Noy Gungun"	Salil Chowdhury		solo
1977	Single	"Aaj Tobe Eituku Thak"	Salil Chowdhury		solo
1977	Single	"Podmo Patay Bhorer Shishir"	Hridaynath Mangeshkar	N/A	solo
1980	Single	"Keno Je Kandao Bare Bare"	Salil Chowdhury		solo
1980	Single	"Ebar Ami Amar Theke"	Salil Chowdhury		solo
1980	Single	"Chim Jhiki Chaak"	Salil Chowdhury		solo
1980	Single	"Boro Bishado Bhora Ei Rojoni"	Salil Chowdhury		solo
1980	Single	"Surjo Dekha"	Salil Chowdhury		solo
1988	Single	"Sobar Arale"	Salil Chowdhury		solo
1988	Single	"Ami Cholte Cholte Theme Gechhi"	Salil Chowdhury		solo
1988	Single	"Bhulona Prothon Se Din"	Salil Chowdhury		solo
1988	Single	"O Amar Pransojoni"	Salil Chowdhury		solo
1988	Single	"Saat Sokale Moner Dore"	Salil Chowdhury		solo
1988	Single	"Dhoronir Pothe Pothe"	Salil Chowdhury		solo
1988	Single	"Ei Jibon Kokhono Mogon"	Salil Chowdhury		solo
1988	Single	"Runner"	Salil Chowdhury		solo
2000	Single	"Jono Gono Mono"	Rabindranath Tagore		Asha Bhosle, Kavita Krishnamurthy, P. Unnikrishnan, Hariharan, S. P. Balasubrahmanyam, Kaushiki Chakraborty, Bhimsen Joshi
2014	Single	"Aajkal Ami Aar"	Salil Chowdhury	Mayuresh Pai	Solo
		"Tumi Robe Nirobe"	Rabindranath Tagore		Hemant Kumar
		"Ke Jeno Go Dekeche Amay"	Hemant Kumar	Hemant Kumar	
N/A	Single	"Mone Rekho Mone Rekho"	Bhupen Hazarika		

== Gujarati songs ==
Year	Film	Song	Composer(s)	Writer(s)	Co-artist(s)
1960	Mehndi Rang Lagyo	"Raste Rajalti Varta"	Avinash Vyas		
1960	Mehndi Rang Lagyo	"Ghunghate Dhankiyo Ek Kodiyu"	Avinash Vyas	Chatrabhuj Doshi	
1960	Mehndi Rang Lagyo	"Mehndi Te Vavi Malve – Garbo"	Avinash Vyas	Traditional	Pinakin Shah, Chorus, Manna Dey
1960	Mehndi Rang Lagyo	"Mehndi Rang Lagyo"	Avinash Vyas	Traditional	Mohammed Rafi
1960	Mehndi Rang Lagyo	"Nayan Chakchoor Chhe"	Avinash Vyas	Avinash Vyas	Mahendra Kapoor
1960	Mehndi Rang Lagyo	"Pandadu Lilu Ne Rang Rato"	Avinash Vyas	Avinash Vyas	

== Kannada songs ==
Year	Film	Song	Composer(s)	Writer(s)	Co-artist(s)
1967	Kranthiveera Sangolli Rayanna	"Ellare Iratheero"	Lakshman Berlekar	Pundalika B. Dhuttharagi	Solo
1967	Kranthiveera Sangolli Rayanna	"Bellane Belagayithu"	Lakshman Berlekar	Bhujendra Mahishawadi	Solo

== Malayalam songs ==
Year	Film	Song	Composer(s)	Writer(s)	Co-artist(s)
1974	Nellu	"Kadali Chenkadali"	Salil Chowdhary	Vayalar Ramavarma	Solo

== Meitei songs ==
Year	Film	Song	Composer(s)	Writer(s)	Co-artist(s)
1999	Meichak	"Nungshiba Magi Ethak Ereida"	Aheibam Shyam Sharma		Laishram Mema
1999	Meichak	"Pammuba Nungshiba"	Aheibam Shyam Sharma	Aheibam Shyam Sharma	

== Nepali songs ==
Year	Film/Album	Song	Composer(s)	Writer(s)	Co-artist(s)
1966	Maitighar	"Jun Mato Ma Mero"	Jaidev	King Mahendra Bir Bikram Shah Dev	
2012	Bachunjelilai	"Bachunjelilai"	Shikhar Shantos, Kiran Kadel	Ananda Adhikari	Ram Krishna Dhakal

== Odia songs ==
Year	Film	Song	Composer(s)	Writer(s)	Co-artist(s)
1963	Surjyamukhi	"Sei Chuna Chuna Tara Phula Aaji"			
1967	Arundhati	"Aji Mun Shrabani"	Santanu Mohapatra	Jibanananda Pani	

== Punjabi songs ==
Year	Film	Song	Composer(s)	Writer(s)	Co-artist(s)
1961	Guddi	"Pyar De Bhuleke"			Mohammed Rafi
1961	Guddi	"Kisse De Na Tute"			
2004	Veer-Zaara	"Lodi"			Gurdas Maan, Udit Narayan
1979	Jugnie	"Haal Jehda Jag Utte"			

=== Non-film songs ===
Year	Album	Song	Music director	Co-singers
2020	Punjabi Film Hits (CD 2)	"Kanjeri Rahi Kanjri"	Sapan–Jagmohan	solo

== Sinhala songs ==
Year	Film	Song	Composer(s)	Writer(s)	Co-artist(s)
1955	Seda Sulang	"Sri Lanka Matha Ma"	Susarla Dakshinamurthi	Ananda Samarakoon	
1955	Seda Sulang	"Idiriyata Yamu"	Susarla Dakshinamurthi	Ananda Samarakoon	Mohideen Baig

== Tamil songs ==
Year	Film	Song	Composer(s)	Writer(s)	Co-artist(s)
1953	Aan (Murattu Adiyaal)	"Izhandhen Unai Anbe"	Naushad	Kannadasan	
1953	Aan (Murattu Adiyaal)	"Nagaru Nagaru Mel Jal Jal"	Naushad	Kannadasan	Shamshad Begum
1953	Aan (Murattu Adiyaal)	"Paadu Singara Paadalai"	Naushad	Kannadasan	S. M. Sarkar, Shamshad Begum
1953	Aan (Murattu Adiyaal)	"Indru Endhan Nenjil Sakhi"	Naushad	Kannadasan	
1955	Vaana Radham	"Yendhan Kannaalan"	Naushad	Kannadasan	
1987	Kannukoru Vannakili	"Inge Pon Veenai" (unreleased)	Ilaiyaraaja		
1987	Anand	"Aararo Aararo"	Ilaiyaraaja	Gangai Amaran	
1988	Sathya	"Valaiyosai"	Ilaiyaraaja	Vaali	S. P. Balasubrahmanyam
1988	Sathya	"Ingeyum" (not Included in the film)	Ilaiyaraaja	Vaali	
1988	En Jeevan Paduthu	"Engiruntho Azhaikkum"	Ilaiyaraaja		Mano

== Telugu songs ==
Year	Film	Song	Composer(s)	Writer(s)	Co-artist(s)
1955	Santhanam	"Niddurapora Thammuda" (part 1)	Susarla Dakshinamurthy	Anisetty & Pinisetty	
1955	Santhanam	"Niddurapora Thammuda" (part 2)	Susarla Dakshinamurthy	Anisetty & Pinisetty	Ghantasala
1988	Aakhari Poratam	"Tellacheeraku"	Ilaiyaraaja	Veturi	S. P. Balasubrahmanyam

== Indonesian songs ==
Year	Album	Song	Music Director	Lyricist	Co-singers	Reference
1991	Album Khusus Soneta Volume 1 – Lata Mangeshkar Ratu Dangdut Dunia	"Sekuntum Mawar Merah"	Rhoma Irama	Rhoma Irama	Solo	
1991	Album Khusus Soneta Volume 1 – Lata Mangeshkar Ratu Dangdut Dunia	"Orang Asing"	Rhoma Irama	Rhoma Irama	Solo	
1991	Album Khusus Soneta Volume 1 – Lata Mangeshkar Ratu Dangdut Dunia	"Datang Untuk Pergi"	Rhoma Irama	Rhoma Irama	Solo	
1991	Album Khusus Soneta Volume 1 – Lata Mangeshkar Ratu Dangdut Dunia	"Di Tepi Pantai"	Rhoma Irama	Rhoma Irama	Rhoma Irama	
1991	Album Khusus Soneta Volume 1 – Lata Mangeshkar Ratu Dangdut Dunia	"Wahai Pesona"	Rhoma Irama	Rhoma Irama	Rhoma Irama	
1991	Album Khusus Soneta Volume 1 – Lata Mangeshkar Ratu Dangdut Dunia	"Musim Cinta"	Rhoma Irama	Rhoma Irama	Rhoma Irama	

== Bhojpuri songs ==
Year	Film	Song	Composer(s)	Writer(s)	Co-artist(s)
1963	Ganga Maiyya Tohe Piyari Chadhaibo	"Ganga Maiyya Tohe Piyari Chadhaibo"	Chitragupt	Shailendra	Usha Mangeshkar
1963	Ganga Maiyya Tohe Piyari Chadhaibo	"More Karejwa Men Pir"	Chitragupt	Shailendra	Usha Mangeshkar
1963	Ganga Maiyya Tohe Piyari Chadhaibo	"Kahe Bansuria Bajaile" (happy)	Chitragupt	Shailendra	
1963	Ganga Maiyya Tohe Piyari Chadhaibo	"Luk Chuk Badra"	Chitragupt	Shailendra	
1963	Ganga Maiyya Tohe Piyari Chadhaibo	"Kahe Bansuria Bajaile" (sad)	Chitragupt	Shailendra	
1963	Laagi Nahi Chhute Ram	"Lal Lal Hothwa Se"	Chitragupt	Majrooh Sultanpuri	Talat Mahmood
1963	Laagi Nahi Chhute Ram	"Rakhiya Bandhala Bhaiya"	Chitragupt	Majrooh Sultanpuri	Talat Mahmood
1963	Laagi Nahi Chhute Ram	"Lagi Nahi Choote Ram"	Chitragupt	Majrooh Sultanpuri	Talat Mahmood
1963	Laagi Nahi Chhute Ram	"Mori Kalaiya"	Chitragupt	Majrooh Sultanpuri	Talat Mahmood
1965	Ganga	"Kanha Tori Bansi Ke Julmi Re Taan"	Chitragupt	Shailendra	
1965	Ganga	"Magan Kahe Nache Tor Man Gori"	Chitragupt	Shailendra	Usha Mangeshkar
1968	Vidhana Naach Nachawe	"Dekh Dekh Hansela"	Dattaram Wadkar	Shailendra	
