= Doli Saja Ke Rakhna =

1998 Indian film directed by Priyadarshan

- Poster
- Directed by: Priyadarshan
- Screenplay by: Neeraj Vora
- Story by: Fazil
- Based on: Aniyathipraavu (Malayalam) by Fazil
- Produced by: Xavier Marquis; Raman Maroo; Rajkumar Santoshi (presenter)
- Starring: Akshaye Khanna; Jyothika
- Cinematography: K. V. Anand; Ravi K. Chandran
- Edited by: N. Gopalakrishnan
- Music by: A. R. Rahman
- Production company: Shemaroo Entertainment
- Distributed by: Shemaroo Entertainment
- Release date: 27 November 1998
- Running time: 168 minutes
- Country: India
- Language: Hindi

Doli Saja Ke Rakhna (transl. "Keep the palanquin decorated") is a 1998 Indian Hindi-language romantic comedy film directed by Priyadarshan. The film stars Akshaye Khanna and Jyothika in her acting debut. It is a remake of the 1997 Malayalam film Aniyathipraavu. The soundtrack was composed by A. R. Rahman. The film's title was inspired by the lyrics of the song Mehndi Laga Ke Rakhna from the film Dilwale Dulhania Le Jayenge.

== Plot ==
Inder moves to a new town to pursue higher studies, despite the pressure from his parents to marry and settle down. He meets a beautiful girl named Pallavi, and it is love at first sight—at least for him. When an opportunity arises, his friends encourage him to talk to her, even though she tries to avoid the conversation. This encounter is witnessed by her brother, who mistakes Inder for a stalker, as do her two other brothers, who assault him and leave him with a warning. Pallavi is the apple of her family's eye and lives with her mother and three elder brothers. They are extremely protective of her, and she does nothing against their wishes. Inder's family is not very different, except that he is the only son.

The thought of Pallavi now weighs heavily on Inder's mind, and he sets out to discover how she feels about him. He asks her to provide an answer, even if it is a negative one.

On the other hand, Pallavi is unable to make a decision, further complicating the situation. When Pallavi's brother finds out that Inder is still pursuing her, he becomes furious and assaults him, warning him to back off. Pallavi, now realising that she has always loved Inder, feels that her timidity has worsened the situation. She confesses her feelings to Inder, and they kindle their relationship, believing that their families will ultimately accept it. Within days, Pallavi's brother sees them together while Inder is playfully chasing Pallavi. He misinterprets this as an attempt to assault her and tries to attack him brutally. However, Pallavi, emboldened by her newfound courage, openly declares her love for Inder, which devastates her family and leads them to disown her.

They search for Inder, forcing the heartbroken couple to elope. Pallavi's brothers track them to Inder's family home, verbally abusing his parents. Inder's parents are convinced that the girl is unsuitable for their son, considering the behaviour of her brothers.

With their dreams shattered and nowhere to turn, the couple goes to one of their two close friends, who takes them to his small village. They are welcomed by his father, the village leader, as well as the villagers. That evening, Pallavi's brothers trace them to the village and encounter resistance from the villagers. They return home, while the villagers plan to arrange the couple's legal marriage the following morning.

Pallavi and Inder, now reflecting on the turmoil they have caused their families and the sorrow they have inflicted upon themselves, decide to step back from their relationship and return to their families. They realise that the best way to prove their love is to reconcile with their parents. Although initially upset by their decision to separate, the village leader appreciates their choice once he understands their reasoning. Upon their return, both families forgive them immediately and welcome them back.

Now recognising the pain their children have tried so hard to hide, both families feel indebted to them. They search for better matches—Pallavi's family arranges a marriage for her. Inder finds a necklace belonging to Pallavi. His parents decide to accompany him to return the necklace, partly due to Inder's mother's desire to meet Pallavi. Both families apologise for their earlier actions, and Inder expresses his remorse to Pallavi's mother. Feeling the weight of the situation, they decide to leave early, but Inder's mother breaks into tears and requests that Pallavi marry her son. Moved by these feelings, everyone agrees to the marriage and apologises to their children for the pain they have caused.

== Cast ==
- Akshaye Khanna as Inderjit "Inder" Bansal
- Jyothika as Pallavi Sinha
- Anupam Kher as Mr. Bansal
- Amrish Puri as Jojo Uncle (Peter's Father)
- Moushumi Chatterjee as Mrs. Chandrika Bansal
- Aruna Irani as Mrs. Sinha
- Paresh Rawal as Dr. Suraj Sinha
- Tej Sapru as Inspector Sinha
- Mohnish Behl as Vikram "Vicky" Sinha
- Viju Khote as Harish Prasad Chaturvedi
- Umesh Shukla as Lallan Chaturvedi, Inder's friend
- Innocent as Retired Colonel R.C Nair
- Ninad Kamat as Peter
- Nandu as Fisherman
- Rathan Mouli as King (special appearance in the song "Bole Sajni Mori Sajni")

== Soundtrack ==
Doli Saja Ke Rakhna

Soundtrack album by A. R. Rahman
- Released: 16 October 1998
- Recorded: Panchathan Record Inn
- Genre: Feature film soundtrack
- Label: T-Series
- Producer: A. R. Rahman

A. R. Rahman chronology
1947: Earth (1998)	Doli Saja Ke Rakhna (1998)	En Swasa Kaatre (1999)

The soundtrack for the film was composed by A. R. Rahman, with lyrics by Mehboob. Rahman later reused five of the songs in the 1999 Tamil film Jodi, which in turn were used in the 2007 remake of Jodi, Sajni, after the producers bought the rights to the songs.

The song "Kissa Hum Likhenge" was shot in the Greek islands of Mykonos and Melos.

No	Song	Artist(s)	Length
1	"Taram Pum"	Babul Supriyo and Srinivas	04:30
2	"Kissa Hum Likhenge"	Anuradha Paudwal and M. G. Sreekumar	04:54
3	"Chal Kehva Re Kheva"	Sukhwinder Singh and Ranu Mukherjee	05:31
4	"Jhula Bahon Ka" Part 1	Sadhana Sargam and Srinivas	05:58
5	"Bol Sajni Mori Sajni"	Sonu Nigam and Kavita Krishnamurthy	06:28
6	"Jhula Bahon Ka" Part 2	Sadhana Sargam	05:57
7	"Taram Pum Taram Pum (Instrumental)"	A.R. Rahman	04:31
8	"Bol Sajni Mori Sajni (Instrumental)"	A.R. Rahman	06:22

== Reception ==
Anish Khanna of Planet Bollywood gave the film 8.5 out of 10. Faisal Shariff of Rediff wrote, "The film plays on traditional family values.

The film was commercially unsuccessful.

== Awards and nominations ==
Year	Award	Category	Recipients and nominees	Results	Ref.
1999	Filmfare Awards	Filmfare Award for Best Female Debut	Jyothika	Nominated	
1999	Zee Cine Awards	Zee Cine Award for Best Female Debut	Jyothika	Nominated	
