= King of Bollywood (book) =

Biography by Anupama Chopra

- Author: Anupama Chopra
- Language: English
- Subject: Shah Rukh Khan
- Genre: Biography
- Published: 9 August 2007
- Publisher: Grand Central Publishing
- Publication place: United States
- Media type: Print
- Pages: 250
- ISBN: 978-0-446-50898-8
- OCLC: 1020446918

King of Bollywood is a biography by the film critic and journalist Anupama Chopra, chronicling the life and career of Shah Rukh Khan. The book describes his personal life such as his birth in 1965 in New Delhi and his marriage to Gauri Chibber in 1991. The book also outlines his career as an actor, film producer, and television presenter. It was published by Grand Central Publishing on 9 August 2007 and became a commercial success. Its critical reception was positive, with Chopra's writing garnering appreciation.

Chopra came up the idea of the book while writing for Dilwale Dulhania Le Jayenge (2002), about the 1995 film of the same name. In the summer of 2003, she told him about the project; although his initial reaction was reluctant, Chopra tried to persuade him for around six months and Khan eventually changed his mind. The book took three years to complete, with Chopra meeting Khan's close friends, school teachers, and collaborators in her writing process.

== Summary ==
The book opens with the information of the background of Shah Rukh Khan's parents, the Indian independence activist Meer Taj Mohammed Khan and his wife Lateef Fatima. Khan was the couple's second child and was born on 2 November 1965 in New Delhi. He grew up in the Rajendra Nagar neighbourhood and was raised in a Muslim household. He made his acting debut on television with Fauji in 1989, which features him as an army officer. Two years later, following a six-year courtship, he married Gauri Chibber, a Punjabi Hindu. Their children, Aryan and Suhana, were born in 1997 and 2000, respectively. Khan's first film role came with Deewana (1992), in which he starred alongside another newcomer Divya Bharti. The film was a commercial success and won him the Filmfare Award for Best Male Debut. In 1993, he portrayed villainous roles in the financially and critically successful thrillers Baazigar and Darr. He won a first Best Actor trophy at Filmfare for his performance in the former, and a nomination for the Best Performance in a Negative Role from the same ceremony for the latter.

In 1995, Khan starred as a young non-resident Indian in the romantic drama Dilwale Dulhania Le Jayenge. Co-starring Kajol, the film turned to be a success at the box office and became the longest-running film in Indian cinema history. The film also won him a second Best Actor award at Filmfare. Other commercial successes of the decade include Karan Arjun (1995), Pardes (1997), Dil To Pagal Hai (1997), and Kuch Kuch Hota Hai (1998). In 2000, along with the actress Juhi Chawla, Khan established the production company Dreamz Unlimited (later renamed as Red Chillies Entertainment in 2003), and its first release was Phir Bhi Dil Hai Hindustani (2000), which failed to garner wide attraction. After playing the leading roles in Mohabbatein (2000) and Kabhi Khushi Kabhie Gham (2001), two films co-starring Amitabh Bachchan, he portrayed an alcoholic protagonist in Devdas (2002), India's most expensive film at the time. The book ends with describing how Khan hosted the third season of Kaun Banega Crorepati in 2007.

== Development and writing ==
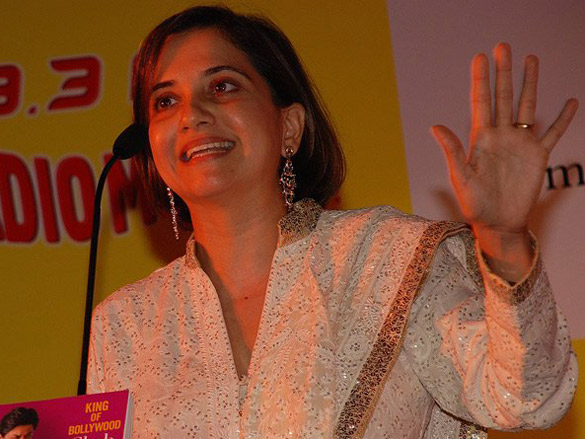
Anupama Chopra conceived the book while writing another book on Dilwale Dulhania Le Jayenge (1995)

The idea of King of Bollywood arose when Anupama Chopra was interviewing Khan for a book—published in 2002—about the production and analysis of the 1995 film Dilwale Dulhania Le Jayenge. Calling herself a "die-hard" fan of Khan, Chopra said that his fascinating personality, his personal life, and his status as one of the most prominent actor of India were her motivation to write the book. She observed of him, "He is a complete entertainer, on and off screen. And that's what makes him endearing. He's articulate, funny, and surprisingly normal. No starry nakhras (tantrums/attitude)." In an interview to the entertainment portal Bollywood Hungama, she described the book as "an attempt to look at Hindi cinema and at India" through the actor's life and work.

Chopra came to Khan with the idea during the summer of 2003.^{:vii} According to her, he was embarrassed at first knowing that someone would write a book about and spend much time with him. He asked Chopra, "Why me?". Khan also spoke of his initial hesitation of the project by saying that he did not feel he deserved it.^{:vii} Yet, feeling that his life would be interesting to be a book, Chopra continued to convince him for six months, after which Khan accepted the idea. She revealed that in this process, she had conversations with the actor for around 30 hours, and would send SMSs and e-mails when he was shooting for the fantasy film Paheli (2005) in Jaipur.

The development took three years, during which Khan also wrote his unfinished memoir, 20 Years to a Decade. The book begins with a brief biography of Khan's fan Bhavesh Sheth, who appeared in the documentary of Khan titled The Inner and Outer World of Shah Rukh Khan (2005). With help from her research associate Leo Mirani, Chopra tracked down Sheth to interview him as a part of the book's research and found him in Ahmedabad while he was visiting his family. Chopra also met around 80 other people as well, including Khan's close friends, school teachers, and directors (including Harry Baweja, Karan Johar, and Aditya Chopra). Asked by the journalists of Rediff.com, Anupama Chopra chose the chapter about his parents as her favourite because of their interesting life story, especially that of his father.

== Release ==
King of Bollywood marked Anupama Chopra's third book after Sholay: The Making of a Classic (2000) and Dilwale Dulhania Le Jayenge (2002). It was released by Grand Central Publishing (previously Warner Books) at an event held by the Indo-American Arts Council and the South Asian Journalists Association in the United States on 9 August 2007, marking the first book on Indian cinema to be published in the country. The book was distributed by Om Books International in India on the same day, while its Marathi-language version was distributed by Ameya Prakashan in the first week of September. Distribution for other countries was done by Westland Books. It was also translated into Hindi and German. The English version sold more than 10,000 copies after ten days, while the Marathi version went on to sell 900 copies in the week following the release. On 2 October, the book was released on Amazon Kindle. Penerbit Hikmah published its Indonesian-language version titled Shah Rukh Khan: The King of Bollywood in August 2008.

== Critical reception ==
King of Bollywood was met with a positive reception from critics, most of whom singling out Chopra's writing for praise. Reviewing for Bollywood Hungama, Faridoon Shahryar called her writing "simple, informative, [and] engrossing" and found that she did not try too hard to grab attention from the book's readers. Shahryar, however, was disappointed by the way she translated the titles of Hindi-language films to English, such as Dil To Pagal Hai to The Heart is Crazy and Kuch Kuch Hota Hai to Something is Happening. Chandan Mitra of India Today believed the book is not only about Khan but also a "broad canvas" depiction of Hindi cinema, concluding that the book successfully targets a broad international audience.

Meghna Desai from Outlook magazine said Chopra had made the book readable and lauded her straightforward writing style, adding that it was not like other books on Hindi cinema which she thought were boring and filled with gossip. The New York Times Book Review's Charles Taylor described it as a "sprightly" and "brilliant" book. An Indo-Asian News Service critic wrote, "Anupama Chopra's ode to Shah Rukh's spellbinding stardom is far more intimate and compact, crisp and to the point, punctuated by bouts of humour occasionally directed at the star." The critic appreciated her for not turning the book into a boring academic discussion as well as her ability to choice suitable words for describing the subject. In an article published in The Hindu, Savitha Gautam noted Chopra's writing was simple and "easy-to-read", stating that the readers would start to admire Khan when they read the book. Similar views of the same aspect were given by Publishers Weekly, who asserted that it made the book to be a "bizarrely-fun read".
