= Apna Bombay Talkies =

2013 song for the Hindi film Bombay Talkies, celebrating 100 years of Indian cinema

- Screen shot featuring various Bollywood actors and actresses

Song by Various artists

from the album Bombay Talkies
- Language: Hindi
- English title: "Our Bombay Talkies"
- Released: 29 March 2013 (promo audio); 2 May 2013 (music video)
- Genre: Filmi
- Length: 4:13
- Label: T-Series
- Composer: Amit Trivedi
- Lyricist: Swanand Kirkire
- Producer: Ashi Dua

Music video
- "Apna Bombay Talkies" on YouTube

"Apna Bombay Talkies" (transl. Our Bombay Talkies) is a Hindi song from the 2013 anthology film, Bombay Talkies. Composed by Amit Trivedi, the song is sung by Udit Narayan, Alka Yagnik, Kumar Sanu, Abhijeet Bhattacharya, Sonu Nigam, Kavita Krishnamurti, Sadhana Sargam, Sunidhi Chauhan, S. P. Balasubrahmanyam, Shaan, Shreya Ghoshal, KK, Sukhwinder Singh, Shilpa Rao, Mohit Chauhan, with lyrics penned by Swanand Kirkire.

The music video of the track features actors Aamir Khan, Madhuri Dixit, Karisma Kapoor, Akshay Kumar, Juhi Chawla, Saif Ali Khan, Rani Mukerji, Sridevi, Priyanka Chopra, Farhan Akhtar, Imran Khan, Vidya Balan, Kareena Kapoor, Ranveer Singh, Anil Kapoor, Shahid Kapoor, Sonam Kapoor, Deepika Padukone, Ranbir Kapoor and Shah Rukh Khan.

== Background ==
On 12 March 2013, choreographer Vaibhavi Merchant announced on Twitter that she is directing a song for Bombay Talkies, celebrating 100 years of Indian cinema. Besides directing the song, Merchant was selected to choreograph and conceptualise it. For the song Merchant had to seek and obtain 80 No Objection Certificates from producers whose clippings have been used for the number. She revealed that around 3500 frames, 19 singers, 100 dancers, 100 members of the crew, and 20 actors were used for the development of the song.

=== Composition and singing ===
The song is composed by Amit Trivedi while the lyrics is penned by Swanand Kirkire. Trivedi kept the basic tune of the song 'neutral' and fit in the different style requirement of different eras of Hindi cinema from the 1930s till date (2010s). In an interview Trivedi stated "It took me 2–3 months to co-ordinate with the singers. There was no briefing and the singers only had a couple of lines. The list (of singers) was of those who had lent their voices to the stars of Hindi cinema".

The song is sung by over 20 singers and marks the first time 20 singers joined up for a song in Bollywood. The singers have recorded for those actors whom they generally do the playback singing for in their films."Apna Bombay Talkies" is the only song which brings legendary singers trio of 90's Kumar Sanu, Udit Narayan & Abhijeet Bhattacharya together for the first time that too with veteran singer S. P. Balasubrahmanyam and finest singers of 2000 like Sonu Nigam, Sukhwinder Singh, Shaan, KK & Mohit Chauhan.The female singer league had a great combination from all times like Kavita Krishnamurti, Alka Yagnik, Sadhana Sargam, Sunidhi Chauhan, Shreya Ghoshal and Shilpa Rao making this song the rarest and finest compilation ever.

=== Picturization ===
On 4 March 2013, reports suggested that Ranbir Kapoor is part of the film as the narrator. It was later confirmed that he rather appears in the title song. On 2 April 2013, it was reported that Aamir Khan will be making a special appearance in a segment of the film. On 3 April 2013, it was revealed that Khan will be not be seen in a separate segment of the film, but in a song dedicated to 100 years of Indian Cinema.

On 13 April 2013, reports confirmed that Aamir Khan and Shah Rukh Khan will be seen together for the first time on Indian screen for the song. It also confirmed the presence of Deepika Padukone, Priyanka Chopra and Kareena Kapoor in the song. On 23 April 2013, it was revealed that both Sonam Kapoor and Anil Kapoor will share screen for this song. Choreographer of the song, Vaibhavi Merchant in her Twitter handle stated all the 20 stars that are making an appearance in the song. On 20 April 2013, it was reported that Arjun Rampal was approached for the song but he declined it mentioning date issues.

The actors featuring in the song followed a dress code where all the men wore black tuxedos and the women wore gold outfits, designed by their own stylists. The song took over a month to be shot entirely as all the actors shot their respective parts independently. Prior to the shooting, the stars come in two or three hours to rehearse their moves. All the actors had one signature step in common. That step was shot at the Asiatic Library in South Mumbai. The whole song took four months to be completed.

== Release ==
A two-minute promo of the audio song was released along with the soundtrack of the album on 29 March 2013. The music video of the song was officially released on 2 May 2013, through the YouTube channel of T-Series.

Background Song Film	Background Song	Singer	Actor
Qayamat Se Qayamat Tak	"Papa Kehte Hain"	Udit Narayan	Aamir Khan
Khalnayak	"Choli Ke Peeche Kya Hai"	Alka Yagnik	Madhuri Dixit
Raja Hindustani	"Pardesi Pardesi"	Alka Yagnik	Karisma Kapoor
International Khiladi	"International Khiladi"	Kumar Sanu	Akshay Kumar
Hum Hain Rahi Pyar Ke	"Ghunghat Ki Aaad Se Dilbar Ka"	Sadhana Sargam	Juhi Chawla
Yeh Dillagi	"Ole Ole"	Abhijeet Bhattacharya	Saif Ali Khan
Bunty Aur Babli	"Bunty Aur Babli"	Kavita Krishnamurthy	Rani Mukerji
Mr. India	"Hawa Hawaii"	Kavita Krishnamurthy	Sridevi
Hum Aapke Hain Koun..!	"Didi Tera Devar Deewana"	S. P. Balasubrahmanyam	None
Dostana	"Desi Girl"	Sunidhi Chauhan	Priyanka Chopra
Dil Chahta Hai	"Woh Ladki Hai Kahan"	Shaan	Farhan Akhtar
Jaane Tu... Ya Jaane Na	"Pappu Can't Dance"	Shaan	Imran Khan
The Dirty Picture	"Ooh La La"	Shreya Ghoshal	Vidya Balan
Jab We Met	"Yeh Ishq Hai"	Shreya Ghoshal	Kareena Kapoor
Band Baaja Baaraat	"Ainvayi Ainvayi"	KK	Ranveer Singh
Slumdog Millionaire	"Jai Ho"	Sukhwinder Singh	Anil Kapoor
Kaminey	"Dhan Te Nan"	Sukhwinder Singh	Shahid Kapoor
Delhi-6	"Masakali"	Shilpa Rao	Sonam Kapoor
Om Shanti Om	"Deewangi Deewangi"	Shilpa Rao	Deepika Padukone
Rockstar	"Sadda Haq"	Mohit Chauhan	Ranbir Kapoor
Dilwale Dulhania Le Jayenge Kal Ho Naa Ho	"Tujhe Dekha Toh" "Kal Ho Naa Ho"	Sonu Nigam	Shah Rukh Khan

== Reception ==
Upon release the song got mixed reactions from people. While most expressed their disappointment with the song as well as the video, some have mentioned that the montage that precedes the video in the film is definitely worth a watch. Reviewers reviewing from The Times of India reviewed the song as a fast, peppy track and stated it 'has a vintage feeling to it' and "is extravagant in nature with an old-world feel". On 3 May 2013, around 400 cakes was given to the film fraternity on behalf of the directors, to celebrate the song.

Reviewers from IBNLive.com stated "Trivedi, who gave beautiful music in several of the popular films last year fails to create a memorable tune in for the anthology film which only appears to be hurriedly put together". Rajeev Masand who reviews from CNN-IBN, stated in his Twitter handle "Can't decide what's worse between the song and the video. How could they get so many stars and do such a wretched job!".

== Theatrical version ==
On 2 May 2014, producer of the song, Ashi Dua confirmed that the whole song is eight-minute long and will pay homage to all the stars who have ruled Bollywood over the course of 100 years of Indian cinema. This version of the song was seen only in theatre.

The first half of the song has clippings of popular films of many yesteryear celebrities like Prithviraj Kapoor, Devika Rani, Ashok Kumar, Nimmi, Suraiya, Bharat Bhushan, Meena Kumari, Nargis, Raj Kapoor, Mala Sinha, Nutan, Achla Sachdev, Suchitra Sen, Balraj Sahni, Dev Anand, Sandhya Shantaram, Nigar Sultana, Dilip Kumar, Rajendra Kumar, Madhubala, Vyjayanthimala, Mehmood, Raaj Kumar, Guru Dutt, Joy Mukherjee, Shammi Kapoor, Manoj Kumar, Waheeda Rehman, Sadhana Shivdasani, Nadira, Geeta Bali, Rakesh Roshan, Tanuja, Nanda, Asha Parekh, Babita, Rakhee, Jaya Bhaduri, Leena Chandavarkar, Helen, Sharmila Tagore, Aruna Irani, Mumtaz, Saira Banu, Rekha, Zeenat Aman, Smita Patil, Parveen Babi, Hema Malini, Kishore Kumar, Sunil Dutt, Feroz Khan, Rajesh Khanna, Sanjeev Kumar, Amitabh Bachchan, Shatrughan Sinha, Shashi Kapoor, Vinod Khanna, Neetu Singh, Shabana Azmi, Moushumi Chatterjee, Jaya Prada, Padmini Kolhapure, Poonam Dhillon, Tina Munim, Meenakshi Seshadri, Amrita Singh, Dimple Kapadia, Rishi Kapoor, Navin Nischol, Randhir Kapoor, Farooq Sheikh, Amol Palekar, Naseeruddin Shah, Dharmendra, Mithun Chakraborty, Sanjay Dutt, Jackie Shroff, Govinda, Sunny Deol and Jeetendra. Brief portions of their films have been picked up and collated on VFX, and made it seems as they are lip-syncing the song. Sudesh Bhosle sung the portion representing golden voices like KL Sehgal, Mohammed Rafi, Mukesh, Kishore Kumar, Hemanta Kumar, S. D. Burman, Mahendra Kapoor and other singers of the golden era while Shailendra Singh and Vijay Benedict joined to sing their own songs from the '80s.

Obtaining videos for the song, Vaibhavi Merchant stated "For the footage used in the song from films in the black-and-white and the coloured era we had go from door-to-door asking producers and their surviving kin for consent. There were 80 permissions to be had. Most of the producers I approached were sweet. They understood the importance of what was being done. Having gotten permission to use footage was not the toughest part. Harder still was that the song required so many visual special-effects".
