= Dilwale Dulhania Le Jayenge (soundtrack) =

Soundtrack album by Jatin–Lalit
- Released: July 1995
- Genre: Feature film soundtrack
- Length: 38:46
- Language: Hindi
- Label: His Master's Voice
- Producer: Jatin–Lalit

Dilwale Dulhania Le Jayenge is the soundtrack to the 1995 film of the same name directed by Aditya Chopra for Yash Raj Films, starring Shah Rukh Khan and Kajol. It was released by the His Master's Voice (now Saregama) label in July 1995. The soundtrack, which was developed for four months, features seven songs composed by Jatin–Lalit and lyrics written by Anand Bakshi. The soundtrack set records in sales, thereby the best-selling Hindi film soundtrack of the year and has been considered as one of the best Bollywood music albums of all time. The album won two Filmfare Awards, out of five nominations.

== Background and production ==
Dilwale Dulhania Le Jayenge features seven original songs composed by Jatin–Lalit in their first collaboration with Yash Raj Films, with lyrics written by Anand Bakshi. Lata Mangeshkar, Asha Bhosle, Kumar Sanu, Abhijeet Bhattacharya and Udit Narayan provided the vocals. Farah Khan and Saroj Khan were the song choreographers. The film directed by Aditya Chopra and produced by his father Yash Chopra stars Shah Rukh Khan and Kajol in the lead roles. It was a record-breaking commercial success upon its release on 20 October 1995 and garnered critical acclaim.

Jatin–Lalit was considered when singer Asha Bhosle contacted Yash Chopra after meeting them. They were unaware of the film as well as the cast, and had presented some of the tunes they had, including the early versions of "Mehndi Laga Ke Rakhna" and "Mere Khwabon Mein". After singing "Mehndi Laga Ke Rakhna", Yash signed them for the film. The duo then worked on the soundtrack for over four months. Over 50 musicians had been employed to contribute the soundtrack, and the duo recorded with advanced technologies from England during that time. Besides that, he further employed a technical team of sound engineers, recorders and mixers who helped them curating songs with advanced sound quality. Some of the interludes were jointly composed by his assistant and music supervisor Richard Mitra, and arranger Babul Chakraborty.

== Composition ==
"Ruk Ja O Dil Deewane" was inspired by "Bachna Ae Haseeno" from Hum Kisise Kum Naheen (1977) due to Aditya's insistence to have a song in the same flavor, but with Shammi Kapoor in place of Rishi Kapoor. Lata Mangeshkar performed all of the female vocals for the track, except "Zara Sa Jhoom Loon Main" and "Ghar Aaja Pardesi". The duo wanted Mangeshkar to perform one of the songs for Akshay Kumar's Khiladi (1992), which she refused to. Yash wanted Mangeshkar as the primary singer of all of his films, and when he discussed on Mangeshkar's inclusion, they felt excited and wanted to curate music that does justice to her vocals. When they showcased those tunes to Mangeshkar (particularly "Tujhe Dekha Toh"), she liked it and agreed to record her tunes for the film. While singing "Mere Khwabon Mein", Aditya gave Mangeshkar's "Bhai Batoor" for Padosan (1968) as a reference for the duo to tune that track. Since Bhosle was instrumental on the duo's recruitment, they wanted to ensure at least one song should be sung by her. While recording "Zara Sa Jhoom Loon Main" as the last from the album, they insisted Yash to record the song with Bhosle as "she could do justice to that song" and eventually hired. Pamela Chopra performed the track "Ghar Aaja Pardesi" and helped the duo to select the tunes and instruments to give a Punjabi flavour. Bakshi was asked to curate the song similar to "Chitthi Aayee Hai" from Naam (1986) in order to make "every Indian who was away from home feel homesick". Chopra herself performed the song owing to "sentimental reasons" which led the duo design the song with her image in mind.

"Mehndi Laga Ke Rakhna" was intended to be composed for Khiladi but left unused. When he performed the scratch version of the tune to Yash and Aditya, the latter wanted to use that song in the film, which the duo agreed. Although neither a bhangra or fast-paced song, as they initially suggested, they felt the song would fit perfectly for the film. In addition to writing the lyrics, Bakshi also composed the opening lines of the song in a single sitting on Yash's request, as "Shah Rukh’s [Khan] entry in the song must be done to the accompaniment of the special two lines" while the remainder has been composed by the duo. "Ho Gaya Hai Tujhko" is the fusion of two different tunes in one song, which was conceptualized from Aditya. The duo described it difficult to record the song, as during the late-1990s, all the songs were recorded live and there was no digital programming. Hence, they had to record the rhythms as longer, with the musicians rehearsing it from 9:30 a.m. to 11:00 p.m. While recording the song, Lalit gestured to instruct the musicians so that they could give the cues to Mangeshkar while singing. "Tujhe Dekha To" was composed when Aditya sung the opening lines of the track, they took those opening words and constructed them as a separate song for the album. After recording, Mangeshkar directly met Jatin–Lalit at the recording studio and congratulated them for his composition. Kumar Sanu's portions had to be re-recorded as they felt he had not "caught the mood of the lyrics and tune" which often happens with male singers while performing duets with Mangeshkar and wanted him to "overdo the feelings" so that he could match up with her vocals.

The title track—which was initially composed for the film—had to be dropped, owing to it being compared with the eponymous song by Ravindra Jain from Chor Machaye Shor (1974). Eventually, there was a situation to use the title song during the antakshari and came up with a tune but was unsuccessful in doing so. He then created another song with the same tune for Jab Pyaar Kisise Hota Hai (1998).

== Reception ==
Bhasker Gupta, writing for AllMusic, said the soundtrack was the best of Jatin–Lalit's career, and that it "marked the beginning of the fifth wave in Indian cinema ...". Vipin Nair, writing for The New Indian Express and Music Aloud also agreed it being the best soundtrack of Jatin–Lalit so far and assigned a score of 8.5 (out of 10). Analysing the film's music during the 25th anniversary, Suanshu Khurana of The Indian Express, said that the soundtrack came at a time when Hindi film music during the early-1990s being "uninspiring" with Aashiqui (1990), Saajan (1991), Deewana (1992), Jo Jeeta Wohi Sikandar (1992), Roja (1992) and Hum Aapke Hain Koun..! (1994) as the exceptions, and listeners' being exposed to Indipop, ghazals and world music with the entry of MTV and Channel V to India during liberalization. He said that the film's music was slightly different in orchestration from Hindi film music, that worked due to Jatin–Lalit's innovation compared to other musicians, and the fresh tunes—despite being inspired from Nadeem–Shravan's "synth-and-dholak" template —as well as Anand Bakshi's lyrics being "neither old-fashioned nor was it boorish" having a sense of colloquialism, helped in the soundtrack's success as it "embodies a plentitude of thought and melody". Khurana further added that the songs had "different permutations and combinations with similar note structures" and all of them were tied well within the film's screenplay.

Uday Bhatia's article for Mint described Dilwale Dulhania Le Jayenge as among the best of Jatin–Lalit's compositions for Shah Rukh Khan's films. Devarsi Ghosh of Scroll.in said "Dilwale Dulhania Le Jayenge’s songs are almost like bhajans in any household that consumes Hindi cinema. Aditya Chopra’s film led Jatin-Lalit towards a dholak-pop sound to which they frequently returned and even brought to Bengali films." At Collider's article for the best-selling soundtracks across the world during the 1990s, Jeremy Urquhart said that the music of Dilwale Dulhania Le Jayenge "plays a huge role in its enduring legacy".

In 2005, the album was judged the top Hindi soundtrack of all time by voters on the BBC Asian Network website. The soundtrack was ranked at number 68 on "Top 100 Bollywood Albums" by Film Companion.

== Sales and records ==
The soundtrack became the best-selling Bollywood soundtrack of the year, with 12 million official units sold by His Master's Voice, although it is estimated the same number or more copies were pirated. More than 1 million of those sales occurred prior to the film's release, with Chopra earning an advance of ₹10 million for the music rights. Gulshan Kumar sold an unofficial version of the soundtrack under his T-Series label. Combined sales of both the official His Master's Voice version and the unofficial T-Series version amounted to 20 million copies. The total number of estimated sales including pirated copies range from 25 million to over 100 million. The soundtrack has also set records on radio stations with repeated airings. Jatin–Lalit recalled that the melody and sound quality made it favorite for airplay in several stations.

== Accolades ==
Awards	Category	Nominee	Result	Ref(s)
41st Filmfare Awards	Best Music Director	Jatin–Lalit	Nominated	
41st Filmfare Awards	Best Lyricist	Anand Bakshi for "Tujhe Dekha To"	Won	
41st Filmfare Awards	Best Lyricist	Anand Bakshi for "Ho Gaya Hai Tujhko"	Nominated	
41st Filmfare Awards	Best Male Playback Singer	Udit Narayan for "Mehndi Laga Ke Rakhna"	Won	
41st Filmfare Awards	Best Male Playback Singer	Kumar Sanu for "Tujhe Dekha To"	Nominated	

== Legacy ==
The film as well as the soundtrack had largely influenced the pop-culture phenomenon. The song "Tujhe Deka To" had been re-used and parodied by several filmmakers, especially Khan and Deepika Padukone in Rohit Shetty's Chennai Express (2013). "Mehndi Laga Ke Rakhna" has been played at weddings across the South Asian diaspora. In October 2021, Aditya announced that he would be directing a Broadway musical entitled Come Fall In Love – The DDLJ Musical, based on the film which debuted on the Broadway season of 2022–2023.

== Track listing ==
Dilwale Dulhania Le Jayenge (Original Motion Picture Soundtrack)
No.	Title	Singers	Length
1.	"Tujhe Dekha To"	Lata Mangeshkar & Kumar Sanu	5:03
2.	"Ruk Ja O Dil Deewane"	Udit Narayan	5:11
3.	"Mehndi Laga Ke Rakhna"	Lata Mangeshkar, Udit Narayan & Chorus	4:48
4.	"Mere Khwabon Mein"	Lata Mangeshkar	4:16
5.	"Zara Sa Jhoom Loon Main"	Asha Bhosle & Abhijeet	4:51
6.	"Ghar Aaja Pardesi"	Pamela Chopra, Manpreet Kaur & Chorus	7:29
7.	"Ho Gaya Hai Tujhko To Pyar Sajna"	Lata Mangeshkar, Udit Narayan	5:51
