= When I Saw You =

When I Saw You may refer to:

- "When I Saw You" (Mariah Carey song), a 1995 song from Daydream
- When I Saw You (film), a 2012 Palestinian drama
- "Tujhe Dekha Toh" (lit. 'When I Saw You'), a song by Jatin–Lalit, Lata Mangeshkar and Kumar Sanu from the 1995 Indian film Dilwale Dulhania Le Jayenge
- "Tumhe Aaj Maine Jo Dekha" (lit. 'When I Saw You Today'), a song by Shankar Mahadevan and Madhushree from the 2003 Indian film Kuch Naa Kaho

== See also ==
- "Tum Ko Dekha To Yeh Khayaal Aaya" (lit. 'When I Saw You, I Thought of This'), a song by Jagjit Singh from the 1982 Indian film Saath Saath
