= Hindi wedding songs =

Genre of Hindi music

Hindi wedding songs are a major genre of Hindi film music. They often form the backdrop of some very memorable emotional or joyful scenes in Hindi movies. They are often played during Indian, and other South Asian weddings.

== Traditional wedding music ==
In North Western India, shehnai is considered to be the musical instrument announcing a wedding procession. Its South Indian counterpart is nadaswaram. In Northwestern India, a dhol drum is generally played.

== Popular wedding songs ==
These are some of most memorable Hindi wedding songs from Hindi movies. Many of them are frequently quoted. Several of them have been rerecorded as remixes and some of them have inspired names of later Hindi movies. They are played during weddings and are often used to accompany dancing.

In addition there are many folk songs in several dialects of Hindi regarding weddings; singing, especially by women, has been a tradition. Many of the film songs were inspired by folk songs.

=== Mehndi ===
- Mehndi Laga Ke Rakhna (Dilwale Dulhania Le Jayenge, 1995)

Keep her ready with mehndi...

- Mehendi Hai Rachne Wali (Zubeidaa, 2001)
- "Desi Girl" (Dostana)

=== Anticipation ===
- Meri Bano Ki Aayegi Baraat (Aaina, 1993)

My banno's (bride to be) baraat will arrive...

- Raja Ki Aayegi Baraat (Aah, 1953)

The barat of my prince will come...

- Meri Pyari Behania banegi dulhaniya (Sachaa Jhutha, 1970)

My dear sister will be a bride...

- "Sar Se Sarki Sarki Chunariya" (Silsila (1981 film))
- Banno Rani Tumhe Sayani (1947 Earth)
- Ye Teri Aankhen Jhuki Jhuki (Fareb (1996 film))

=== Baraat arrival ===
Also see Hindi dance songs

- Din Shagna Da (Phillauri, 2017)

Translation: The auspicious day has arrived...

- Le Jayenge Le Jayenge (Chor Machaye Shor, 1974)

They will come and take her...

- Aaj Mere Yaar Ki Shaadi Hai (Aadmi Sadak Ka, 1977)

Today, my friend is getting married...

- Baharon Phool Barsao (Suraj, 1966)

O spring breeze, sprinkle flowers...

- "Pyaara Bhaiya Mera " (Kya Kehna ) 2000)

My Brothers Come As A Groom

- "lo chali mein apne devar ki barat le ke (hum apke hai koun)"
- Bachna Ae Haseeno Lo Main Aa Gaya
- Tenu leke (Salaam-E-Ishq, 2007)

=== Humour and teasing ===
These are humorous songs that ridicule the baraatis:

- Jute de do paise lelo (Hum Aapke Hain Koun..!, 1994)

OK, take the money, now give back the shoes...

- Sasural Genda phool (Delhi 6, 2009)

In-laws' house is like marigold flowers...

- Didi Tera Devar Deewana (Hum Aapke Hain Kaun, 1994)

Sister Your Brother In Law Is Crazy

- Zoor Ka Jatka (Action Replay, 2010)

Wedding is a sudden life jolt, marriage is punishment for life, you will be sad for life, it is better to hang oneself than to marry

- Bhootni Ke (Singh is King, 2008)

Who made you a groom, you son of a witch

- fuly fatu faltu
- Rukmani Rukmani (Roja, 1992)
- Main Joru Ka Ghulam (Joru Ka Ghulam, 2000)
- Gal Mithi Mitthi Bol (Aisha, 2010)
- Jodi Ye Jachdi Nai (Gadar, 2001)

This couple doesn't fit well together

=== Bridal singer ===
- Bindiya Chamkegi (Do Raaste, 1969)

My bindi will shine...

- Ai Meri Zohra Jabeen, (Waqt, 1965)

O my bright faced!...

- Badan pe sitare lapete hue (Prince, 1969)

With stars wrapped around you...

- Yeh Chaand Sa Roshan Chehra (Kashmir Ki Kali, 1964)

This face shining like the moon...

- Chaudhvin Ka Chand ho (Chaudhvin Ka Chand, 1960)

Are you full moon...

=== Making a commitment for life ===
- Jab koi baat bigad jaaye (Jurm, 1990)

When something will go wrong...keep me company...

- Aap Ki Nazron Ne Samjha (Anpadh, 1962)

In your eyes, I am worthy of love...

- Tum Agar Saath Dene Ka Vada Karo (Hamraaz, 1967)

If you promise to keep me company...

- Joh Wada Kiya (Taj Mahal)

What you have promised, you will have to...

- O sathi re (Muqaddar Ka Sikandar, 1978)

O my companion, what will be life without you...

- Jis Gali Mein Tera Ghar (Kati Patang)

May I not take the road, where your home is not...

=== The phere ===
- Jab Tak Pure Na Ho Phere Saat (Nadiya Ke Paar, 1982)

Until the seven rounds have been taken...

- Tare Hain Barati {Virasat}

=== The joining ===
- Kabhi Kabhie Mere Dil Mein (Kabhi Kabhi, 1976)

Sometimes I think, you were made for me...

- Mera Yaar Dildaar Bada Sona (Jaanwar, 1999))

My beloved friend, so enticing...

- Nain Se Nain naahin (Jhanak Jhanak Payal Baje, 1955)

Don't look at me...

=== Blessings ===
- Mubaarak Ho tumko yeh shaadi tumhaari (Haan Maine Bhi Pyaar Kiya, 2002)

=== Vidai ===
- Bābul ki duāye leti jā (Neel Kamal, 1968)

Take your daddy's blessings...

- Yeh Galiyan Yeh Chaubara (Prem Rog, 1982)

These lanes and squares...you will not come here again...

- Pi Ke Ghar Aaj Pyari Dulhaniya Chali (Mother India, 1957)

For her beloved's home, the lovely bride leaves...

- Babul ka ye ghar behna ek dinka thikana hai (Daata, 1989)

This father's home is just a day's stay, my sister

- Baabul Jo Tumne Sikhaya...Sajan Ghar Mein Chali Hum Aapke Hain Koun..!
- kehta hai babul babul
- Kabira (Encore) (Yeh Jawaani Hai Deewani, 2013)
- Dilbaro (Raazi) 2018

=== Arrival of the newlyweds ===
- Main to bhuul chalii baabul ka des (Saraswatichandra, 1968)

I have started to forget my daddy's country...

- Aaye Ho Meri Zindagi Main (Raja Hindustani,1996)
- Mere Hathon Main Nau Nau Chodiyan (Chandni, 1989)

I have nine bangles in each of my hands...

- Baalam Se Milan Hoga (Chaudhvin Ka Chand, 1960)

The day has come, you will meet your beloved...

- Ghunghat Nahin Kholungi (Mother India, 1957)
- Ye haseen vaadiyaan, ye khula aasmaan...aagaye hum kahaan, ae mere jaanejaa... (Roja, 1992)

=== Together forever ===
- Ek Bangla Bane Nyaara (President, 1937)

Let there be a new house...

- Chalo Dildar Chalo (Pakeezah, 1972)

Come, my beloved, come...

- Tere mere sapane, ab yek rang hain (Guide, 1965)

Now my dreams and yours, are the same color...

- Ham Jab Honge Saath Saal Ke (Kal Aaj Aur Kal, 1971)

When I will be 60, and you 55....

- Hum Tum Yug Yug Se (Milan)

For many many eons, both of us...

== See also ==
- Hindu wedding
- Punjabi wedding traditions
- Indian wedding photography
- Wedding music
- Hindi dance music
