= Indian cinema and Switzerland =

Relationship between Indian cinema and Switzerland

Although Indian cinema has been shot in a variety of foreign settings, the use of Switzerland as a backdrop for many scenes in Indian cinema, especially Hindi films, has been particularly notable for its unusual prevalence, with the country being consistently featured and involved as a setting despite its relatively far distance from India, small size, lack of a significant diaspora population, and location outside the Anglosphere. This has been attributed to its natural beauty, particularly the snowy mountains of the Swiss Alps which are considered an exotic locale for much of India and are heavily featured in romantic scenes, that Indian filmmakers were looking for to replace Jammu and Kashmir after the security situation there deteriorated. It is estimated that around 200 Indian films have been at least partially shot in Switzerland.

This phenomenon started in 1964 with the film Sangam, and some films followed in its footsteps through the rest of the decade. With the liberalisation of the Indian economy, there was a major boom in the use of Switzerland as a setting in the 1990s, with Dilwale Dulhania Le Jayenge (1995) and other Yash Raj films being considered the ones that cemented Switzerland in the Indian public. As the practice started to be perceived as cliche and Bollywood expanded its use of other locales, the use of Switzerland has since entered a decline. However, the Swiss government and tourism associations have successfully used these images of Switzerland to successfully promote travel from India, with financial incentives being offered for further productions to be filmed there and statues of Indian film personalities being built. Although Indians make a small share of tourism in the country, their numbers are growing rapidly, with "Bollywood tours" becoming popular throughout central Switzerland.

== History ==
Snowy mountains have been a popular setting in Hindi cinema for romantic scenes and love songs, a tradition which Indologist Philip Lutgendorf states has its roots in the Hindu mythos of the mountains as a supernatural place that also serves at the "playground" of the immortals in love and lust, as well as stereotypes of the "liberalness" of mountain populations based on Indian perspectives of Kashmir and Nepal. Traditionally, locations in India with the required terrain and climate such as Jammu and Kashmir, Manali and Ooty have been used. The first Indian film shot in Switzerland was 1964's Sangam. In the film, the protagonists go on a European honeymoon, visiting the Swiss Alps around Grindelwald and Interlaken while dealing with the tension of a love triangle. The film was advertised as the first in Indian cinema with scenes in Western European places such as London and Venice along with Switzerland, and led to other films featuring international shots, with 1967's An Evening in Paris being filmed completely abroad, including in Switzerland.

After 1970's Prem Pujari, the practice started to wane and went stagnant for the next two decades. However, the same year, filmmaker Yash Chopra went to Switzerland on his own honeymoon. Inspired, he started working in the country into his own projects. The first film he shot in Switzerland was Faasle in 1985, but it was Chandni (1989) which began to implant Switzerland in India's popular consciousness, as it was not only a major hit but also revitalized the romantic genre after a period of action dominance, giving the country and its scenery a romantic connotation for many Indians. The same year, the insurgency in Jammu and Kashmir began, making the area too unsafe for most film production. Combined with the liberalisation of the Indian economy, this led to the number of Indian film shoots in Switzerland reaching a high point in the 1990s, with over a dozen per year. The most famous film of the period was Chopra's Dilwale Dulhania Le Jayenge (1995), which went on to become one of the most famous Bollywood films ever. However, Switzerland started being perceived as cliche soon afterwards as audiences wished for more realistic stories and interludes, and has also faced competition from other destinations that are either closer to India or offering more financial incentives, so the amount of Indian productions filming there has dropped substantially, with only two to three a year in 2013. Nevertheless, major Hindi film productions have continued to shoot there alongside a growing number of Telugu, Tamil and Kannada films due to ease of shooting and low bureaucratic hurdles compared to other countries.

Between 1923 and 2018, Switzerland was measured to be the second most popular country in Europe, behind the United Kingdom, for shooting by Indian film productions. The overwhelming majority of Indian films filmed in Switzerland have been shot in the center of the country, mainly in the canton of Bern in places such as Interlaken and Gstaad. A. S. Bhalla has suggested that may be due to the relatively accessibility of that region compared to southern Switzerland, which has similar scenery, and existing familiarity among Indian audiences crediting a feedback loop that results in new productions and tour agents ignoring lesser known sites. Although other Indian film industries have also shot scenes in Switzerland, Hindi cinema's usage of the country is the most well known and studied.

== Impact ==
Through this exposure, Switzerland has been firmly placed in India's national popular culture, with Indian president Ram Nath Kovind proclaiming that "Bollywood has taken Switzerland to every nook and corner of India" on a 2019 visit to the country. Through initiatives and promotions from the Swiss government and tourism companies, this popularity has been harnessed to fuel a small but quickly-growing trend of Indian tourism in Switzerland through the last decade. Yash Chopra's films in particular have been recognized for their role in publicizing Switzerland, with a statue of him being built in Interlaken in tribute.

== See also ==
- Indians in Switzerland

== Bibliography ==
- Bhalla, A. S. (7 January 2019). Switzerland Then and Now. Notion Press. ISBN 978-1-68466-032-2.
- Janta, Hania; Herzog, Metka (8 August 2023). "7: Contemporary Indian film productions in Switzerland". Film and Place in an Intercultural Perspective. London: Routledge. pp. 118–135. doi:10.4324/9781003293347-10. ISBN 978-1-003-29334-7.
