= Punjabi wedding traditions =

Overview of the wedding traditions in Punjab

Sikh paintings of a Punjabi wedding procession, ca.1850–1900
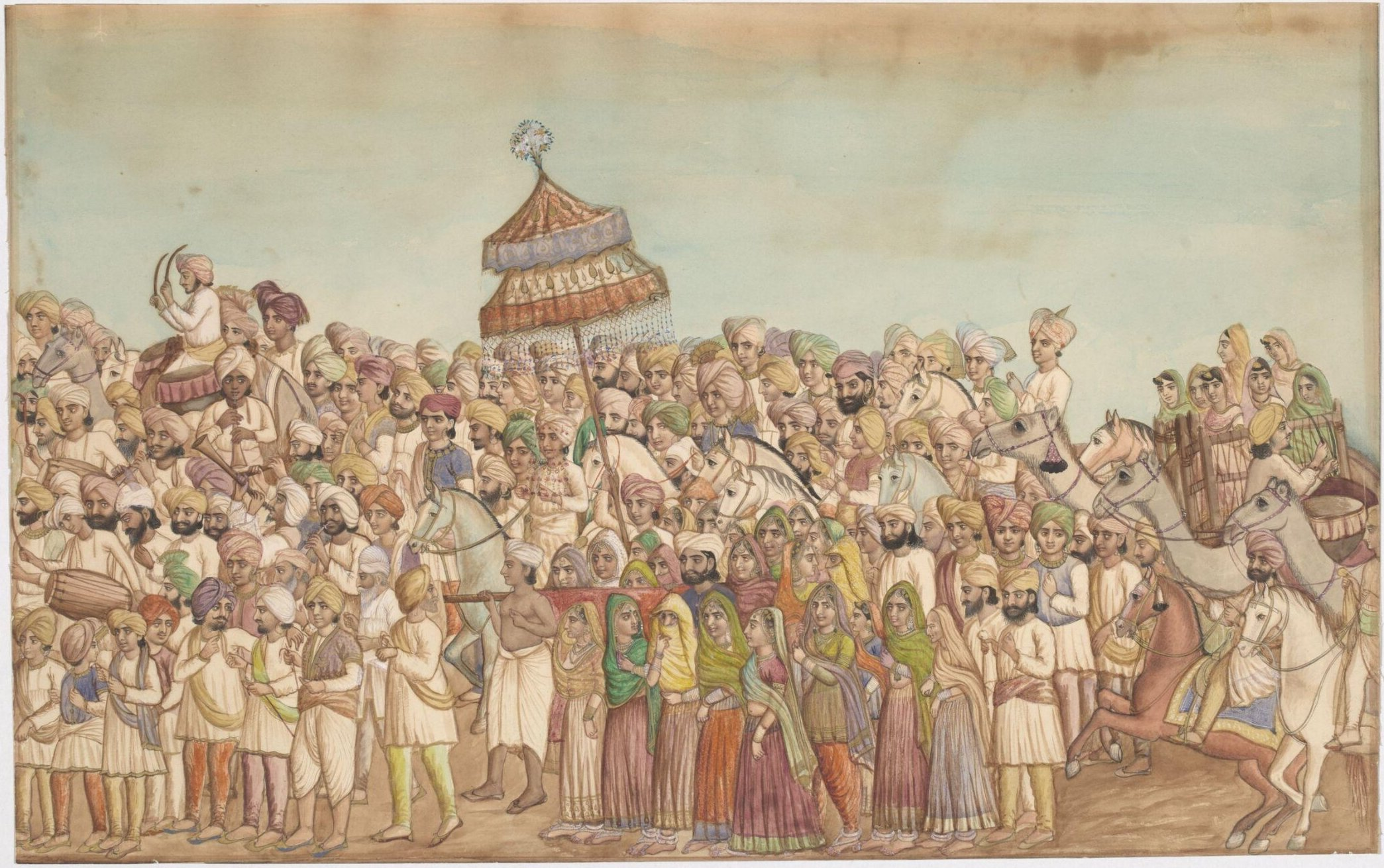
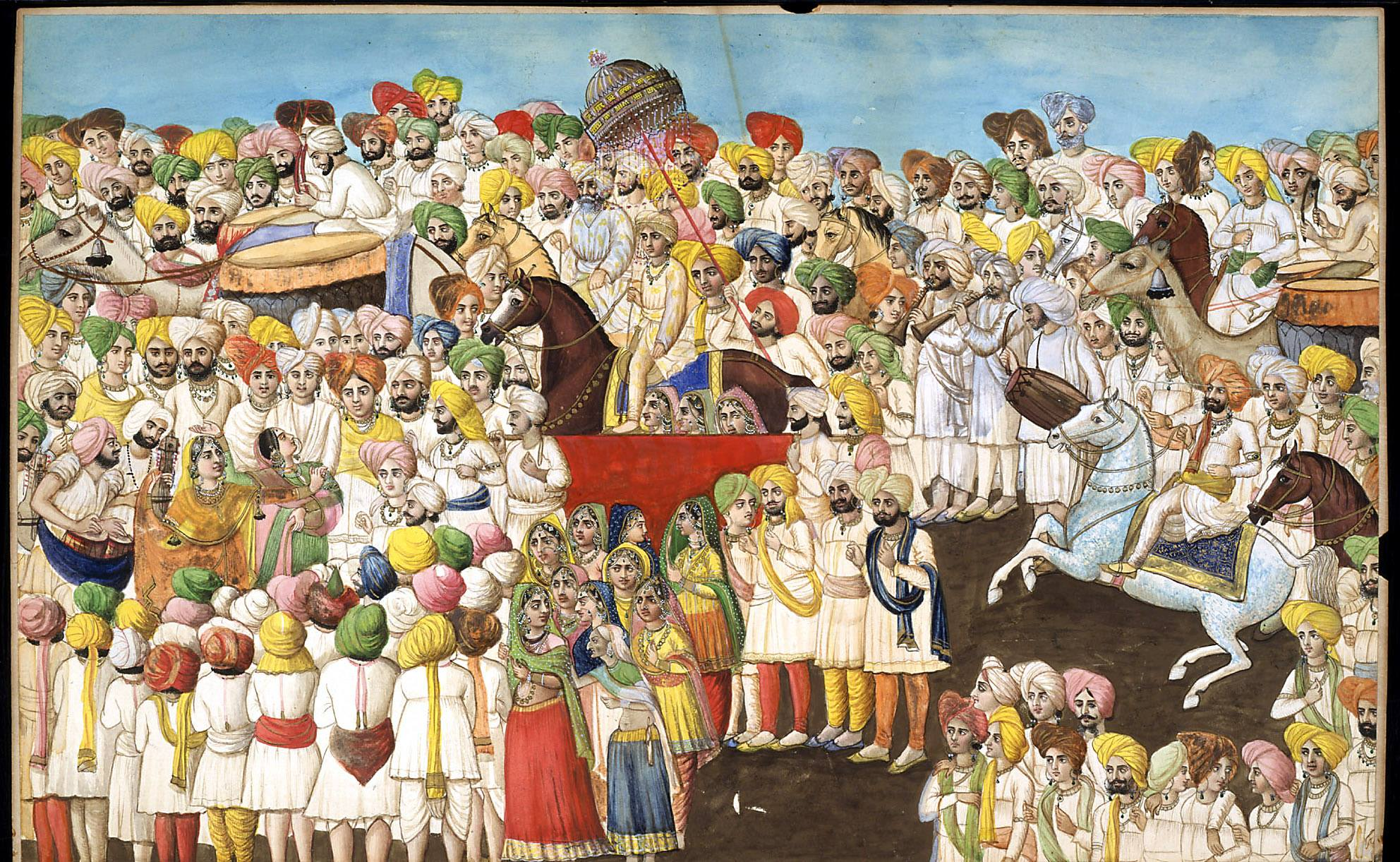

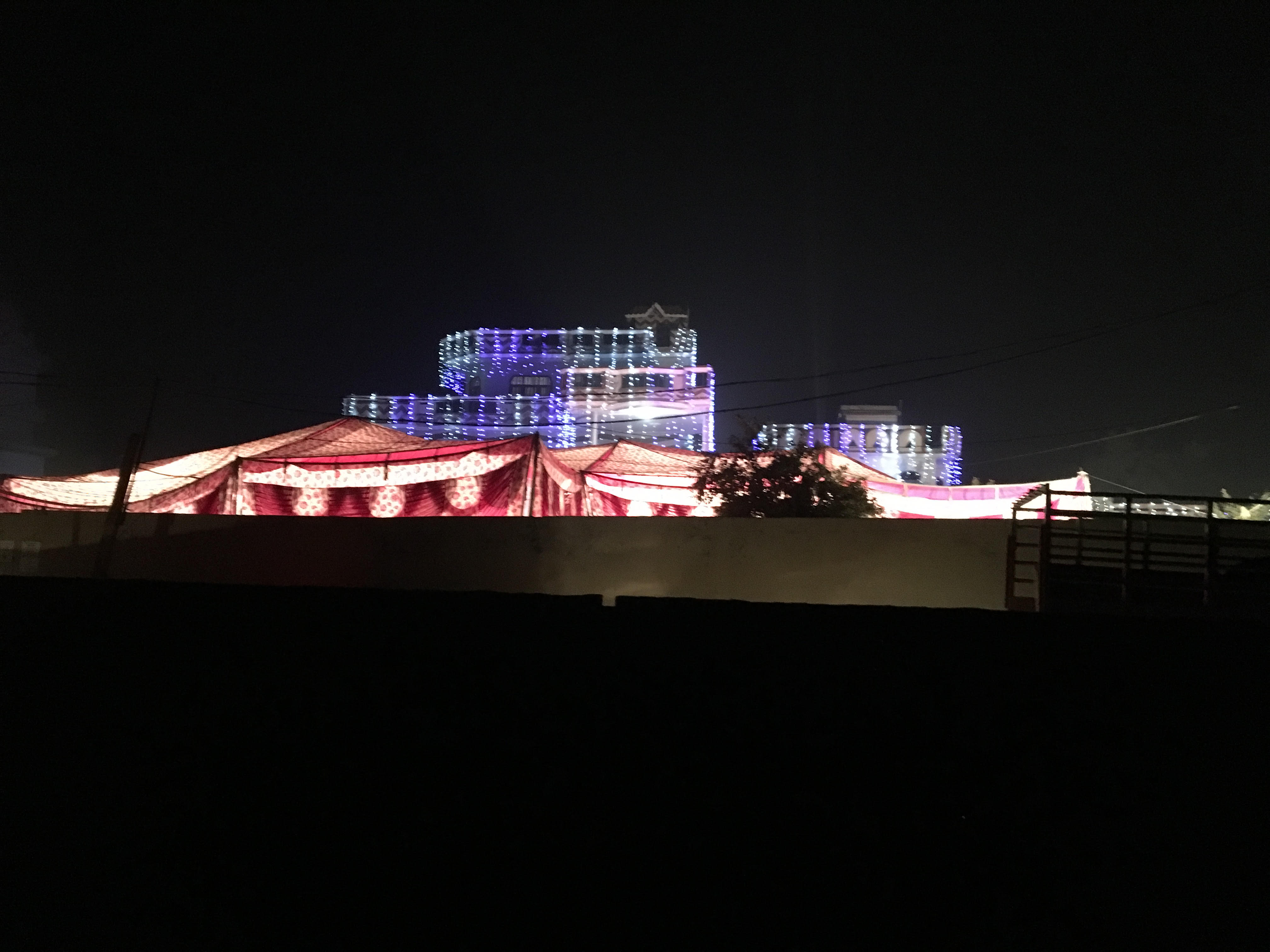
Punjabi wedding in Mudh, Jalandhar

Punjabi wedding traditions strongly reflect Punjabi culture with rituals, songs, dances, food, and dress that have evolved over centuries. There are also some variations of Punjabi wedding traditions based on the couple’s religion, with the main religions in the region including Islam, Hinduism, and Sikhism. A Punjabi wedding usually consists of the pre-wedding ceremonies (Rokka, Kurmai, Sangeet, Mehndi, Mayian, Haldi, Jaggo), the wedding day ceremonies (Milni, Varmala, Joota chupai), and post-wedding ceremonies (Vidaai, Reception, Phera Dalna) which usually take place ahead of the traditional Hindu or Sikh ceremony. The weddings are lively and joyful celebrations filled with music, dance, and traditional rituals. They usually include colourful events like the mehndi and sangeet, where family and friends sing and dance together. The wedding ceremony is often held at a gurdwara where the couple walks around the Guru Granth Sahib, or a within a traditional Hindu mandap. Punjabi weddings bring families together and celebrate love, culture, and community.

== Pre-wedding traditions ==
Roka

The word Roka means "to stop" and symbolizes the end of the courtship process. Roka is one of the most significant ceremonies that take place before a Sikh or Hindu Punjabi wedding. The Roka ceremony marks the union of both the bride and groom's family and friends. During this event, the families of the bride and groom will begin to make general plans for the upcoming wedding, such as the date of the wedding. Gifts from both families are acceptable at Roka, with families usually exchanging gifts like fruits and candies. Some families may also have the couple exchange rings during the event. Towards the end of the event, the bride and her family will be given additional gifts and gold. Some Punjabis will also partake in a ceremony called the Chunni Chadana where the groom’s family gives the bride a chunni (drape) that symbolizes her acceptance into the family.

=== Kurmai (engagement) ===
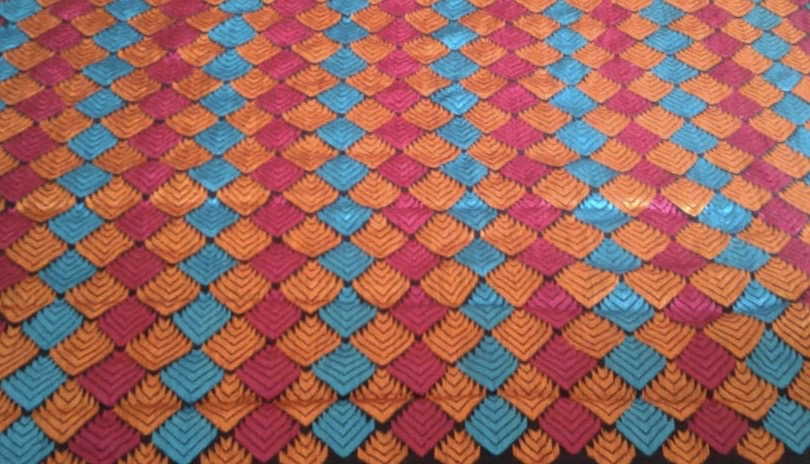
Phulkari embroidery for a Punjabi wedding in the U.S., 2019

Engagement is a significant part of a Punjabi wedding. First, the girl is draped with a phulkari (very decorative dupatta), which is usually very ornate. In some families, this chunni is a family heirloom, passed down from generation to generation. She is also presented with jewelry, which her mother and sister-in-law help her wear. A tiny dot of henna paste (mehndi) is applied to her palm for good luck, and the function is sealed with the exchange of rings. The bride's father applies the tikka (forehead mark) to the groom's forehead and blesses him. The exchange of gifts takes place between the two families. Everyone present congratulates the couple by feeding them sweets. Phulkari textiles have traditionally formed part of Punjabi bridal trousseaux and have been passed between generations as family-made wedding gifts.

=== (Ladies) Sangeet / Dholki ===
The word sangeet is Sanskrit for "sung together." A sangeet ceremony is a traditional Indian prewedding ceremony involving lots of festive dancing and celebratory songs. According to Sen, "Historically, the Indian wedding tradition of a sangeet ceremony was a female-only event that was organized by the ladies of the bride and groom's families to celebrate the bride a few days before the main wedding ceremony. During the event, the women of the families gather together and sing folk songs as a celebration of the union. They will also perform Giddha (folk dances usually performed by women). Modern Sangeet ceremonies have evolved to being celebrated in either one's home or in larger venues to accommodate the proposed number of guests, with male family members and friends also included to take part in the fun.

=== Mehendi ===
Another function before the wedding is decoration with temporary henna (mehndi; henna ceremony). Family members or mehendi artists are called to the houses of the boy and girl and apply mehendi to the palms of the female family members and the hands and feet of the bride. A basket containing Bindi and bangles is handed around so girls can choose those that match the outfit they plan to wear to the wedding. The Mehendi ceremony takes place in the atmosphere of a party with singing, dancing and feasting. Sometimes the mehendi is sent by the future mother-in-law, which is beautifully decorated. There is a common superstition that the darker the mehndi ends up becoming, the more the mother-in-law loves her new daughter-in-law. Additionally, there is a tradition where the initials of the groom are hidden in the intricate designs of the mehendi and the groom is challenged to find his initials.

=== Chooda ===
In both the Hindu and Sikh variations of the Punjabi wedding, the rituals at the girl's home begin with the choora ceremony. The oldest maternal uncle and aunt play an important role in the performance of the ceremony. Choora is a set of red bangles, gifted by the girl's mama (mother's brother). People touch the choora and give their heartiest wishes to the girl for her future married life. After that, the girl's uncle, aunt, friends, and cousins tie kaliras (silver, gold, or gold-plated traditional ornaments) to a bangle worn by the girl. Once the wedding ceremony is complete, brides may hit the kaliras against each other over the heads of unmarried girls on the bride’s side to predict who will get married next, a custom similar to throwing the bouquet in white weddings. If pieces fall on the girl’s head, it means that she will be married next.

=== Haldi / Vatna ===
Four lamps or diyas are lit and the bride sits facing them. Oil is constantly poured into the lamps so that the glow from the diyas is reflected on her face. Vatna involves applying a paste made from turmeric powder and mustard oil all over the bride's body by her female friends and relatives. This is done to make the bride glow on the most special day of her life. This ritual demands that the bride stay at home in her old clothes for a couple of days before her wedding. Vatna/Ubtan (a mixture of turmeric, gram flour, rose water, and other beneficial skincare ingredients) is supposed to bring a glow to the bride's and groom's bodies, especially on their faces. This tradition is also known as Shaint in some cultures. After this ritual, the bride and groom are constrained from meeting each other until the wedding ceremony.

=== Ghara gharoli (Hindu) ===
A decorated pitcher of water (ghadoli) is brought for the bride's bath by the bride's bhabi (brother's wife). In the ghara gharoli ritual, the bride's sibling or sibling's spouse visits the nearby temple and fills a pitcher with holy water. The girl is then bathed with this holy water. Thereafter, the bride wears her wedding attire. The ghara gharoli and the vatna ceremonies take place at the groom's house too. But over there, the groom's sister-in-law brings the pitcher of water. As per the tradition, their wedding dress is presented to them by their respective maternal uncles.

=== Jaggo ===
Jaggo translates "to wake up". In this ceremony, the family dances and sings in the beautifully decorated wedding home. Jaggo is celebrated in the last hours of the night. They decorate copper or brass vessels called khadaa with diveh (clay lamps) and fill them with mustard oil and light them. The bride or bridegroom's maternal aunt (mami) carries it on her head, and another woman will carry a long stick with bells, shaking it. The women will then go into other friends' and families' homes; after being welcomed by sweets and drinks, they dance there and move on. It is a loud ceremony, filled with joy, dancing, fireworks, and food. It is also practiced in Pakistan.

=== Mayian ===
This ceremony is an evening festival, at the couple's parental homes. It consists of many rites, the Vatna, Choora, Jaggo fireworks, and sometimes the Sangeet and Mehndi. The Mayian typically happens a couple of nights or the night before the wedding and is celebrated according to which part of Punjab the participants are from. In some areas, the Maiyan begins with the couple getting a red thread called mauli tied on their wrists. The couple will also have Vatna reapplied to look refreshed for the wedding day. The couple typically remain secluded in their homes to prepare for the wedding and to avoid evil eye.

== Wedding Day Traditions ==
=== Rituals at the grooms’s home ===
Sarvala: A young nephew or cousin dons the same attire as the groom. He is called the sarvala (caretaker of the groom) and accompanies him.

Sehra: Like at the bride's home, the Vatna and Ghara Gharoli are followed by the dressing up of the groom in his wedding attire. In a Hindu Punjabi wedding, a puja is performed after the groom has dressed up in his wedding clothes. Thereafter, the groom's sister ties the sehra on the groom's head - this is called Sehrabandi. After the completion of Sehrabandi ceremony, all those who witness the function give gifts and cash to the boy as a token of good luck.

Varna is a ceremony that is supposed to ward off the evil eye. The groom's bhabi lines his eyes with surma (kohl).

Ghodi Chadna is the final ceremony at the groom's place. The groom's sisters and cousins feed and adorn his mare. To ward off the evil eye, people use cash and perform the Varna ritual. The cash is then distributed among the poor. After this, the boy climbs the horse and leaves his home for the wedding venue.

=== Milni ===
Milni means "introductions". In a Sikh marriage, Ardas is performed by the person in charge of looking after the Sikh scriptures, followed by the formal introductions of senior men in the families. For example, both eldest chachas (father's younger brother) will come together and exchange garlands of flowers. In the Milni ceremony, the girl's relatives give shagun (a token of good luck) to the groom's close relatives in descending order of age. Cash and clothes are gifted.

=== Jaimala/Varmala (Hindu) ===
After Milni, the bride and groom come to the center of the mandap where the family is standing and place a beautiful garland made of fresh flowers- varmala on each other. This acts as a statement that they choose and accept each other, and it is traditional for the girl to place the varmala on the groom first to signify her choice. Friends and relatives of the bride and groom indulge in teasing and fun, to celebrate this happy occasion by playfully lifting the bride and groom as the other places the garland around them. An auspicious time or muhurat is chosen for the performance of the wedding ceremony.

=== Wedding Event ===
==== Hindu Traditions ====
On the day of the Hindu ceremony the wedding kicks off with a Baraat or Jaan procession which is the Groom's grand entrance for his big day. Traditionally the groom arrives on a white horse or elephant, and in modern times, he may arrive in a decorated car or even a helicopter. The Grooms family and friends will dance their way to the wedding venue, celebrating their excitement and joy of this big day. The bride's mother and family will traditionally welcome the Groom at the doorstep, performing a traditional welcome ritual, before bringing the Groom to the Mandap themselves.

All Hindu ceremonies including the wedding begin with a Ganesh pooja as Ganesha blesses us with new beginnings. The bride's father and mother, and sometimes the groom's parents sit within a four-pillared gazebo which is called a mandap following the rituals as guided by the maharaj (priest). When the initial rituals are completed, the maharaj calls for the 'Kanya' as in the bride, who is traditionally brought in to the Mandap by her Mama (maternal Uncle). In some weddings, an antarpat is held up in front of the groom so that he cannot see the bride until she is within the mandap itself. The bride and groom first exchange Varmala - a sacred Hindu tradition signifying choice and acceptance and then the parents perform the Kanyadaan which generally represents the bride's parents giving her away. The bride and groom make offerings to the sacred fire, agni, before walking around the sacred fire - this is known as the pheras. After this the groom applies Sindoor (vermilion) to the girl's hair partition and the Mangalsutra Rasam takes place where the groom ties a black-bead and gold necklace i.e. a mangalsutra to his bride. The couple begin their married life by exchanging something sweet to eat, and then the bride and groom take blessings of all the elder members of the family in the traditional Hindu custom of touching the elders feet.

==== Sikh Punjabi Traditions ====
In a Sikh wedding, the bride and groom will walk in tow around the Guru Granth Sahib four times, called laavaan. This signifies they vow to see each other as one soul in two bodies, the ideal in Sikh marriage, and acknowledge the Guru as the center of their marriage..

=== Joota chupai ===
Joota chupai means 'hiding the shoes'. In Hindu and Sikh weddings, the bride's sisters indulge in stealing the groom's shoes when he takes them off before entering the sacred space of the mandap or gurudwara. It is a playful tradition, in which the girls charge a fee for agreeing to return the shoes after the wedding when the bride and groom leave. Traditionally, the bride's sisters demand gold Kalecharis for themselves and silver for her cousins.

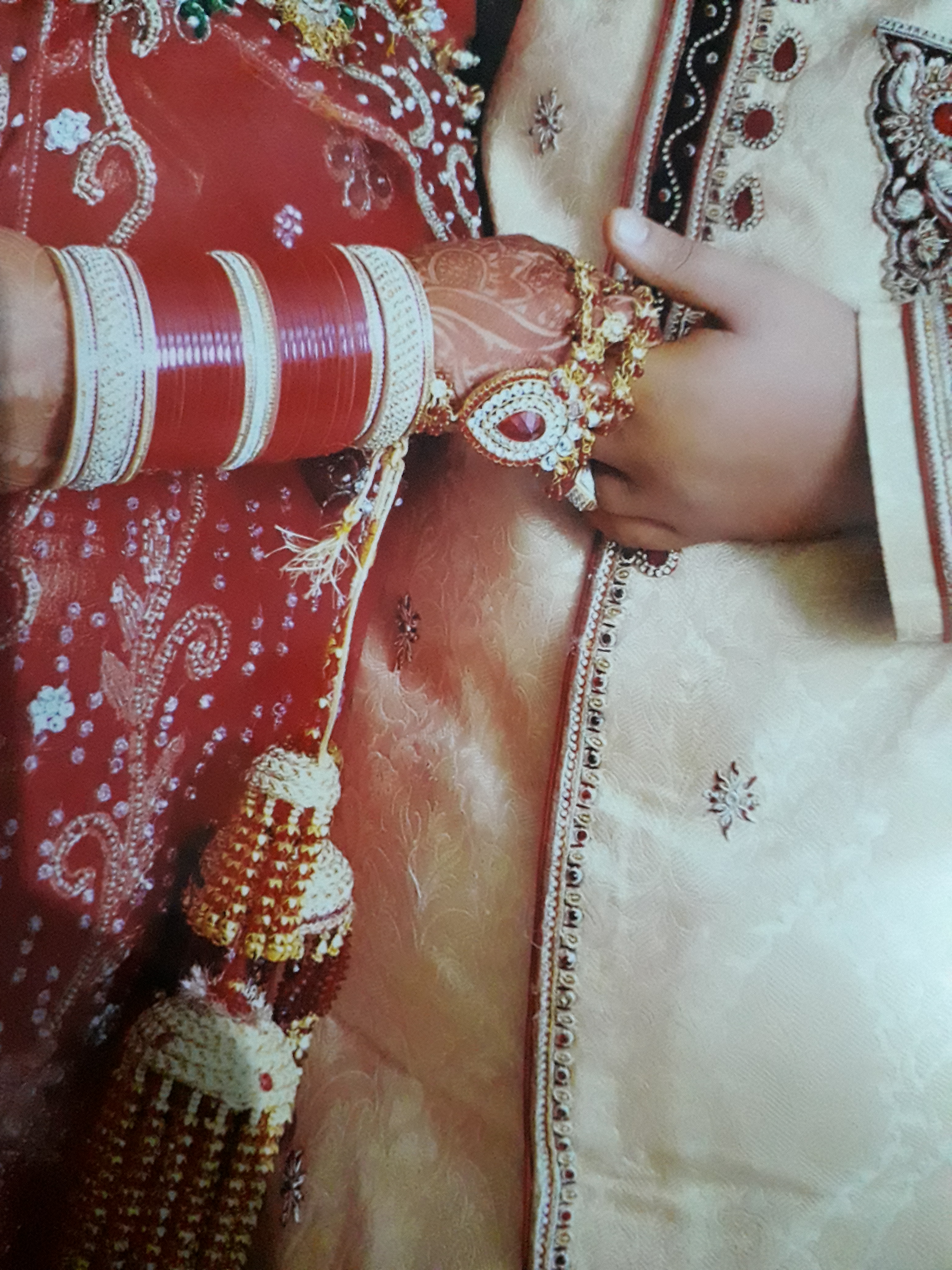
Chuda and kalire ceremony

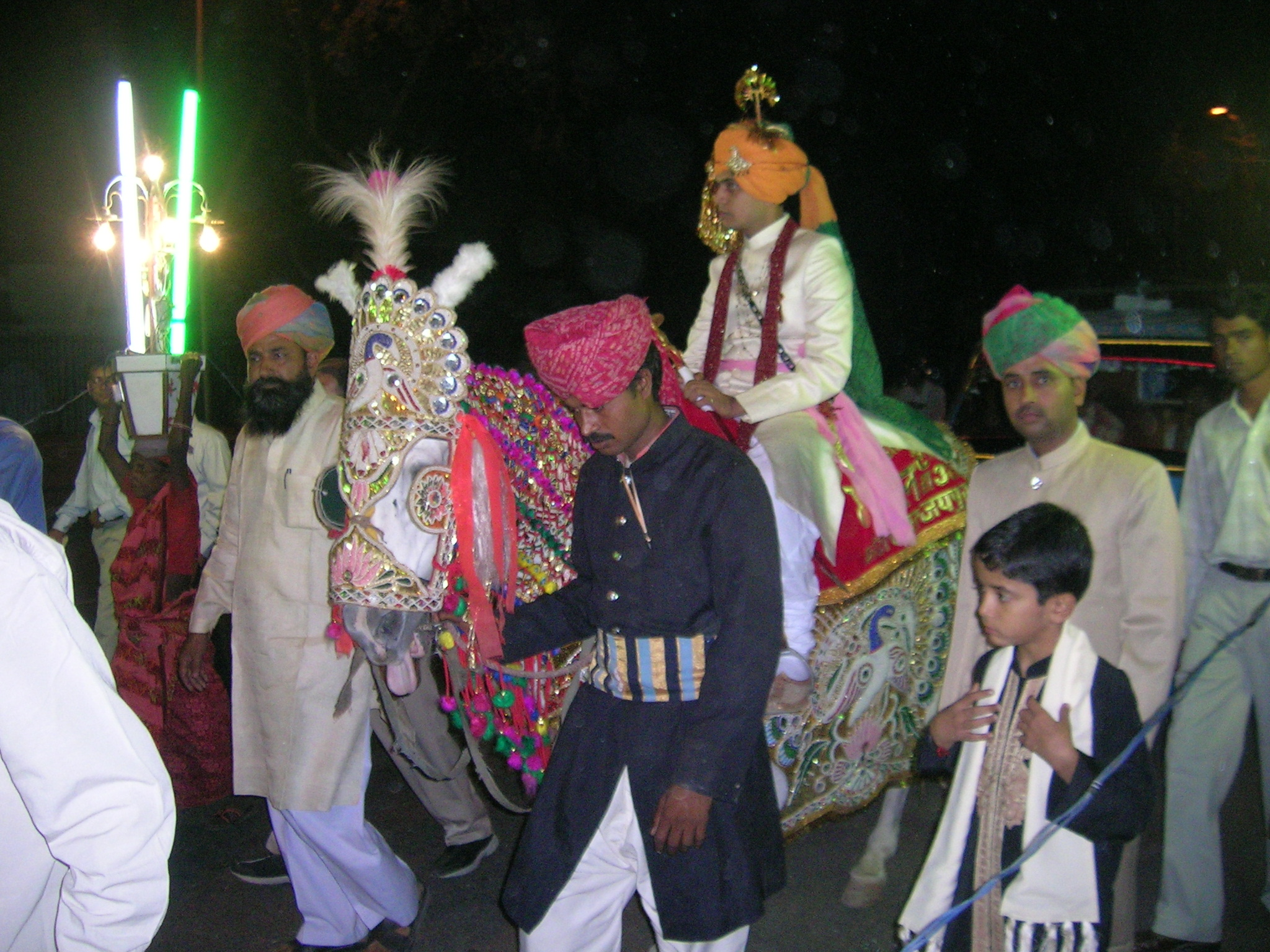
Groom riding a horse with his sarbala

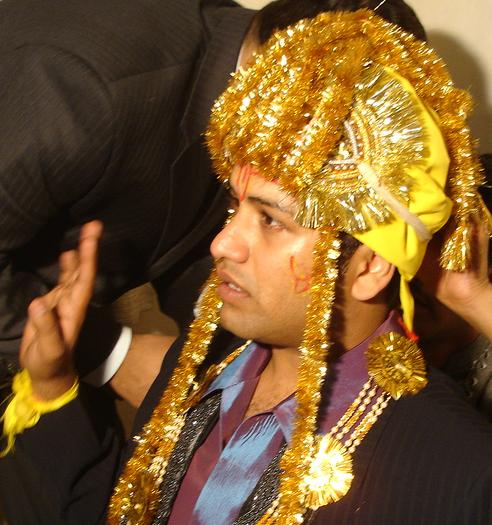
A groom with sehra

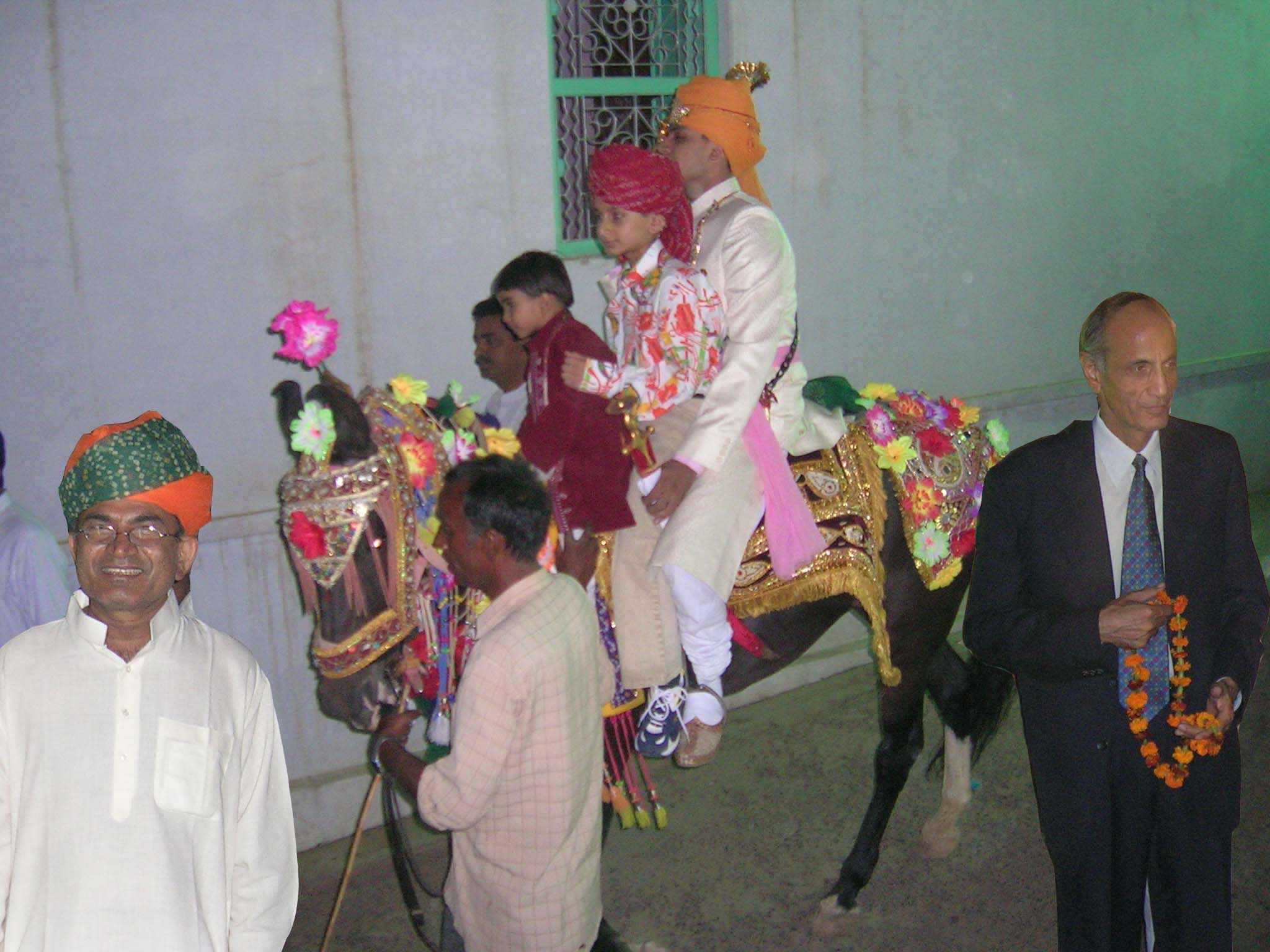
Ghodi chadna

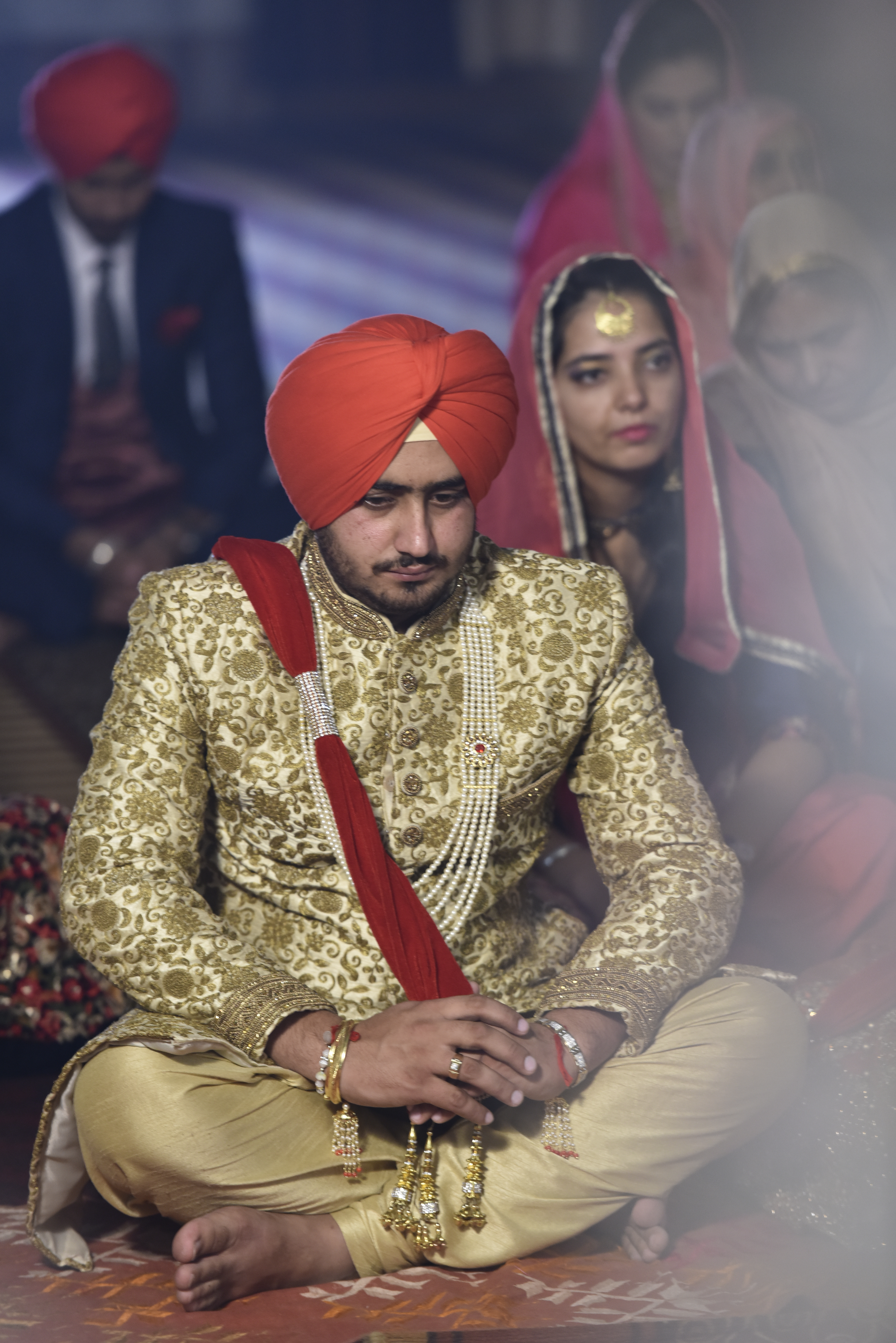
Sikh groom at Milni

Jaimala in Punjabi Hindu Wedding

== Post-wedding rituals ==
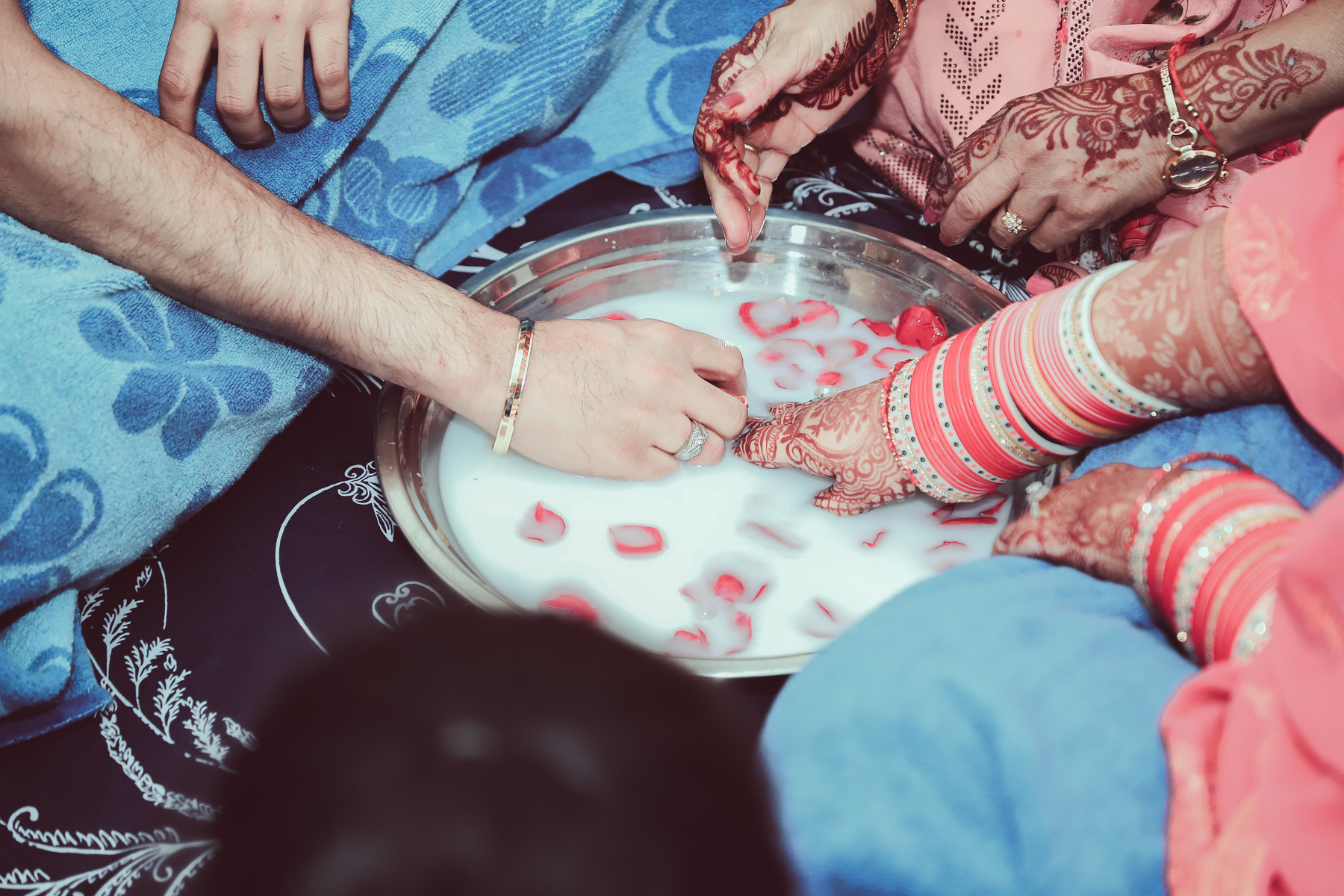
Ring finding ritual

=== Vidaai/Doli ===
Vidaai marks the departure of the bride from her parental house. As a custom, the bride throws phulian or puffed rice over her head. The ritual conveys her good wishes for her parents. A traditionally sad ritual, here the bride says goodbye to her parents, siblings, and the rest of her family as she embarks on a new chapter as someone's wife. Her brothers/male cousins then lead her to her husband, who waits to take her to his family home to begin her new life as a married woman. Her relatives throw coins in the wake of this procession.

The mother-in-law has a glass of water in her hand, which she circles three times around her new daughter-in-law and then offers it to her to drink, as a symbol of her acceptance and blessing as her newest daughter.

=== Reception ===
The newlyweds are welcomed in a ceremony called the pani bharna at the groom's house. Then the bride must, with her right foot, kick the sarson ka tel (mustard oil) that is put on the sides of the entrance door before she enters the house. Then, along with her husband, she must offer puja in their room. Then they must touch the feet of the elders in a ceremony called matha tekna. The rest of the evening is spent playing traditional games.

=== Phera Dalna ===
The newly weds visit the bride's parents on the day after the wedding. The bride's brother usually fetches them.

== Important wedding songs ==
Songs of the bridegroom's side

- Mangane di geet: sung at the time of engagement
- Maneve de gaon: songs sung to welcome the bridegroom
- Gharouli de geet: sung while filling the pitcher (gharouli) for Bride/Bridegroom's bath before the wedding
- Chounki charanvele de geet: songs sung when the bridegroom sits on the chounki wooden bathing seat
- Suhag: sung by the bride in praise of her parents and the happy days of her childhood and in anticipation of happy days ahead
- Jaggo: procession song to call the neighbours to the wedding
- Churra charan vele da geet: sung when the chura ceremonial bangles are worn by the bride
- Janj: sung when the janj marriage procession is to be greeted
- Milni: sung at the ritual introduction of the two sides
- Ghenne de geet: sung when the bride is adorned with jewels
- Siftan: song in praise of the bridegroom
- Chhandh: evolved from poetry, songs of joy

Sitthniyan (taunts)

- Song sung when the bridegroom's procession is being welcomed
- Song sung when the wari, or gifts from the bridegroom's side, are being exhibited
- Song sung when the groom's party sits down to the meal
- Song sung when the daaj, dowry or the bridal gifts, are being displayed

Others

- Lavan Phere: sung at the time of the actual wedding ritual
- Maiya: sung when the girl is preparing for the wedding and is bathed by the women at home. It goes for both men and women.
- Vedi de geet: sung while erecting the marriage pandal
- Khatt: sung at the time the maternal grandparents present gifts to the bride on an overturned tokra, or basket
- Pani vaarna: welcoming the bride to her new home
- Bidaigi: sung when the bride is being sent off in the doli
- Ghughrian: sung when the doli arrives at the groom's house
- Shahana: sung by mirasis in praise of the bridegroom
- Til Methre: sung while welcoming the bride and orienting her to the family
- Pattal: song sung before meal

== See also ==
- Hindu wedding
- Sikh wedding
- Punjabi culture
- Indian wedding photography
- Hindi wedding songs
