= Bombay Talkies (soundtrack) =

2013 soundtrack album by Amit Trivedi

Soundtrack album to Bombay Talkies by Amit Trivedi
- Released: 29 March 2013
- Recorded: 2012–2013
- Genre: Feature film soundtrack
- Length: 23:30
- Language: Hindi
- Label: T-Series
- Producer: Amit Trivedi

Amit Trivedi chronology
Kai Po Che! (2013)	Bombay Talkies (2013)	Ghanchakkar (2013)

Bombay Talkies is the soundtrack album to the 2013 anthology film of the same name which consisted of four short films directed by Karan Johar, Dibakar Banerjee, Zoya Akhtar and Anurag Kashyap. The film's soundtrack was composed by Amit Trivedi with lyrics written by Amitabh Bhattacharya and Swanand Kirkire and was released under the T-Series label on 29 March 2013.

== Development ==
Amit Trivedi worked on the film's soundtrack since late 2012. He described working on the music as a challenging process, stating "every score for me has been like a board examination. But this one is like a civil-services examination" as he not only had to align with the musical sensibilities of the four directors, but also curate the soundscape that is faithful to the era that each filmmaker recreates in the short films. While Johar's short film had few lip-sync songs, the rest of the film did not need much, only focusing on the background score with each film having its significant flavor and requirement. He worked on nearly four to five months, on utilizing the correct soundscape; this prompted him to forgo his offers for Rakeysh Omprakash Mehra's Bhaag Milkha Bhaag (2013) and Subhash Ghai's Kaanchi (2014).

Trivedi was assigned to compose a song that would depict the evolution of Hindi cinema from the 1930s to the early 2010s thereby capturing different musical landscapes. To incorporate such changes in styles and differences in the melodic structure, he kept the tune "neutral" so that it could fit the various styles in different eras without compromising its essence and central theme. The song "Apna Bombay Talkies" featured veteran singers Kavita Krishnamurthy, Alka Yagnik, Kumar Sanu, Udit Narayan, Abhijeet Bhattacharya and S. P. Balasubrahmanyam, who collaborated with other prominent singers from the new generation to pay tribute to the centennial anniversary of the Hindi cinema; all those singers would lend their vocals to the respective actors. Trivedi took nearly three months to co-ordinate with the singers, as they had a couple of lines.

== Marketing and release ==
The soundtrack was released under the T-Series label on 29 March 2013. A four-minute video of "Apna Bombay Talkies" directed and choreographed by Vaibhavi Merchant was released through YouTube on 2 May 2013. The video is originally eight-minutes long and was seen in theatres.

== Reception ==
A reviewer from The Times of India wrote "all tracks in this album (and particularly the lyrics) seem to be intimately married to their picturisation and their cinematic context." Another reviewer based at Indo-Asian News Service wrote "Bombay Talkies songs are high on emotions. If you have an ear for classic music, then this is a must album for you. It tells a story that other musical tracks have missed out so far." Sankhayan Ghosh of The Indian Express wrote "The set of three excellent songs are weighed down by a couple of ordinary ones, but on the whole, Bombay Talkies stands above an average Bollywood album." Karthik Srinivasan of Milliblog called it as a "curious side project from Amit Trivedi".

== Track listing ==
No.	Title	Lyrics	Singer(s)	Length
1.	"Bachchan"	Amitabh Bhattacharya	Sukhwinder Singh	4:06
2.	"Akkad Bakkad"	Swanand Kirkire	Mohit Chauhan	5:03
3.	"Murabba" (Duet)	Amitabh Bhattacharya	Amit Trivedi, Kavita Seth	3:12
4.	"Bombay Talkies"	Swanand Kirkire	Kailash Kher, Richa Sharma	4:13
5.	"Murabba" (Solo)	Amitabh Bhattacharya	Javed Bashir	3:42
6.	"Apna Bombay Talkies"	Swanand Kirkire	Udit Narayan, Alka Yagnik, Kumar Sanu, Sadhana Sargam, Hariharan (singer), Kavita Krishnamurthy, Kailash Kher, Usha Uthup, Shaan, Shreya Ghoshal, Lou Majaw, Mame Khan, Shilpa Rao, Mohit Chauhan, Amit Trivedi	4:16
