= Mehndi Laga Ke Rakhna =

Song by Lata Mangeshkar, Udit Narayan

from the album Dilwale Dulhania Le Jayenge
- Released: 1995
- Label: Saregama, YRF Music
- Songwriter: Anand Bakshi (lyrics)

"Mehndi Laga Ke Rakhna" (transl. Be ready with Mehndi applied) is a popular 1995 Hindi song from the Bollywood film Dilwale Dulhania Le Jayenge, sung by Lata Mangeshkar and Udit Narayan.

== Credits ==
- Singer - Lata Mangeshkar, Udit Narayan
- Lyricist - Anand Bakshi
- Label - Saregama
- Music Label - YRF Music

== Reception ==
The song was picturised in a film sequence showing a wedding celebration with the film's cast. Even after two decades of its release, it remains one of the most popular songs played on Indian wedding rituals in North India. The soundtrack album of the film is one of the best selling Bollywood albums.

A 2018 documentary film about the film by Natashja Rathore explores the legacy of its songs and characters.

== Other versions ==
The song was used in a Pakistani restaurant advertisement by Waseem Hassan Sheikh. Jay Sean sang an English version of the song.

== See also ==
- Hindi wedding songs
