= Dilwale Dulhania Le Jayenge (book) =

Book by Anupama Chopra

- Cover of the 2016 edition
- Author: Anupama Chopra
- Language: English
- Subject: Dilwale Dulhania Le Jayenge
- Publisher: British Film Institute; HarperCollins
- Publication date: December 2002
- Publication place: United Kingdom; India
- Media type: Print
- Pages: 95
- ISBN: 0-85170-957-5

Dilwale Dulhania Le Jayenge (known as Dilwale Dulhania Le Jayenge: The Making of a Blockbuster in India) is a 2002 Indian book written by the journalist and film critic Anupama Chopra. It details the production of and analyses the plot as well as the commercial performance of Aditya Chopra's 1995 romantic drama of the same name, the longest-running film in Indian cinema history.

Dilwale Dulhania Le Jayenge was released by the British Film Institute in the United Kingdom in December 2002, while HarperCollins in India in the next year. The book received positive reviews from critics, with Anupama Chopra's writing gaining the most appreciation. It was re-released under the title of Dilwale Dulhania Le Jayenge: A Modern Classic by HarperCollins as well on 7 November 2016.

== Summary ==
The book opens with an analysis of the success of Dilwale Dulhania Le Jayenge, an Aditya Chopra-directed romantic drama that was opened on 20 October 1995. Starring Shah Rukh Khan and Kajol, it focuses on two young non-resident Indians who fall for each other during a trip across Europe with their friends. The film emerged as the highest-grossing Indian film of the year and, as of 2001, broke the record of the 1975 action-adventure film Sholay as the longest-running Indian film. It later examines the effort of its director, who began his career as an assistant director, to make the film.

== Development and writing ==
Dilwale Dulhania Le Jayenge was the journalist and film critic Anupama Chopra's second book after Sholay: The Making of a Classic (2000), which won the National Film Award for Best Book on Cinema. In an interview to Rediff.com, she said that her decision to write the book because the film—which is her favourite—is widely regarded as a milestone and "shaped" the Hindi cinema of the 1990s. Different from her previous book, Dilwale Dulhania Le Jayenge mostly analyses why the film was successful both commercially and critically. Chopra added that the book was targeted for a non-Indian audience, adding, "I had to explain things that we Indians otherwise may take for granted. Like the background of the country and the Hindi film industry. The production part is just one chapter of the book, unlike in the previous book where it was entirely about its making."

== Release ==
Being a part of its "BFI Modern Classics" series, the British Film Institute published Dilwale Dulhania Le Jayenge in the United Kingdom in December 2002, with HarperCollins released it as Dilwale Dulhania Le Jayenge: The Making of a Blockbuster in India in the next year. On 7 November 2016, the latter company re-published the book under the Dilwale Dulhania Le Jayenge: A Modern Classic title.

The book received positive reviews by critics. In a review for The Hindu, Paresh C. Palicha praised it for "[staying] clear of the gossip mill stuff, but touches on the famous spats over the credits for story and dialogues". Nasreen Munni Kabir said, "Chopra's research is thorough and her understanding of storytelling keeps us connected to what might well be brushed off as facts about process. She injects life into incidents that may have seem inconsequential to reveal so much of how a director thinks." Joginder Tuteja from Bollywood Hungama rated the book two-and-a-half stars and spoke of how it "successfully living its life" and "without much of an influence from the external factors".
