= Kaleera =

Jewellery worn around the wrist

Kaleera, also spelled kalira, is a traditional piece of bridal jewellery worn on the wrists, primarily in North India and later adopted more widely. Before the wedding ceremony, a kaleera is tied to each of the bride’s wrists by her sisters, friends, or maternal aunt. The ornament typically features dangling elements such as trinkets and bells, along with a central dome-shaped part that was historically used to hold snacks and dry fruits like fox nuts and coconuts for the bride’s journey after the wedding.

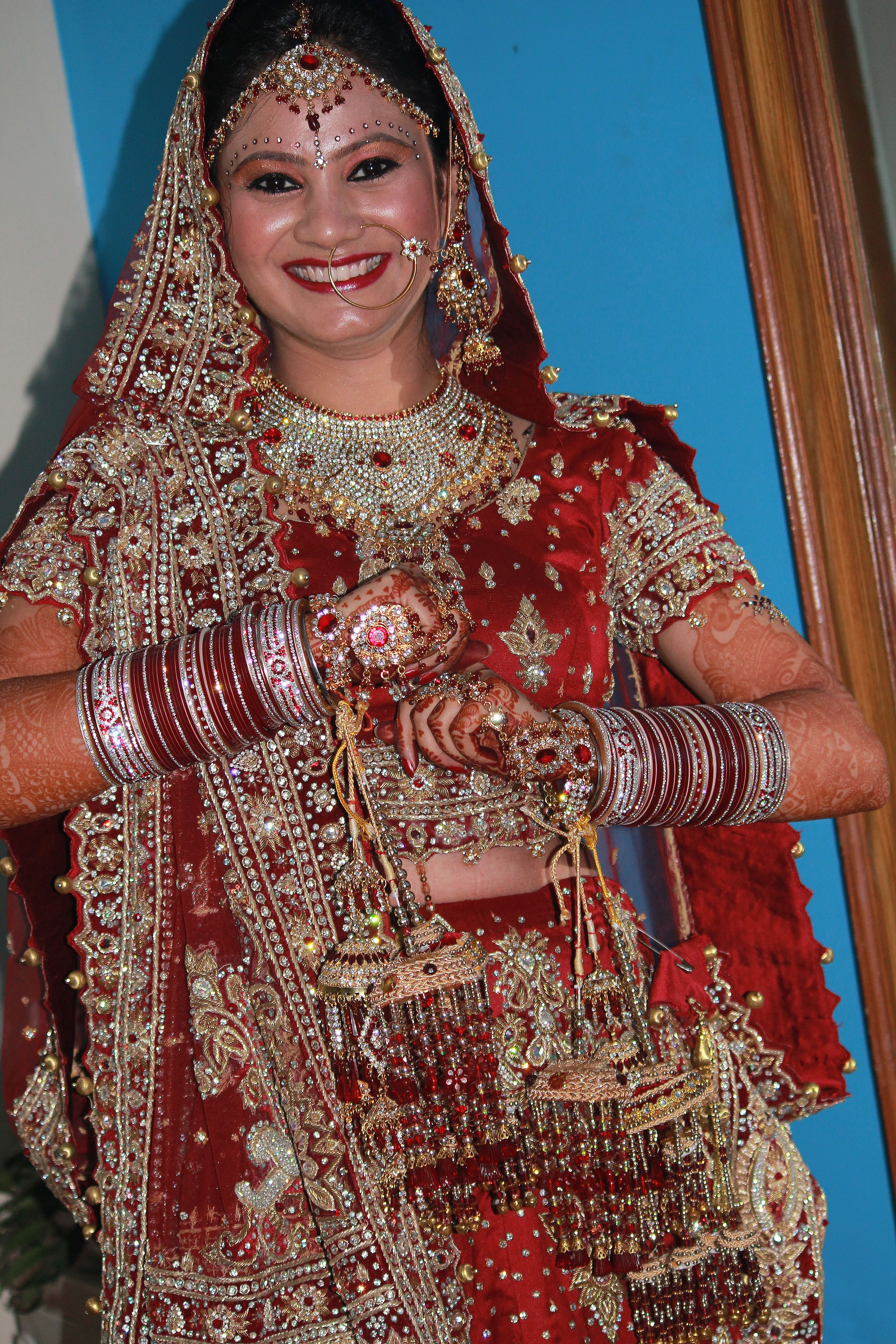
Indian bride wearing kaleeras on wrists
