= Tujhe Dekha Toh =

Song

"Tujhe Dekha Toh" is a song by Lata Mangeshkar and Kumar Sanu, with music by Jatin–Lalit and lyrics by Anand Bakshi, from the 1995 Indian musical romance film Dilwale Dulhania Le Jayenge. It was one of the most notable works of Lata Mangeshkar in the 1990s and was picturised on Shah Rukh Khan and Kajol.

== Music video ==
It was shot amidst mustard flower fields in Gurgaon.

== Cover versions ==
The song has been played in Burj Khalifa during the celebration of birthday of Shah Rukh Khan. Actor Ayushmann Khurrana celebrated 27 years of Dilwale Dulhania Le Jayenge by mimicking this song. Shah Rukh Khan sang this song at Red Sea Film Festival. Ranu Mondal sang this song in a reality show. The song has been also released in the Bhojpuri language. Fans of Shah Rukh Khan from Kenya have also sang this song.

== Awards and nominations ==
- Anand Bakshi got Filmfare Award for Best Lyricist for this song in 1996
- Kumar Sanu nominated for Filmfare Award for Best Male Playback Singer
- One of the 100 Greatest Bollywood Song of All Time by BBC Asian Network
- Voted song of the year
