= Dilwale Dulhania Le Jayenge =

1995 Indian film by Aditya Chopra

- Theatrical release poster
- Directed by: Aditya Chopra
- Written by: Aditya Chopra
- Dialogues by: Javed Siddiqui
- Produced by: Yash Chopra
- Starring: Shah Rukh Khan; Kajol
- Cinematography: Manmohan Singh
- Edited by: Keshav Naidu
- Music by: Jatin–Lalit
- Production company: Yash Raj Films
- Distributed by: Yash Raj Films
- Release date: 20 October 1995
- Running time: 189 minutes
- Country: India
- Language: Hindi
- Budget: ₹4 crore
- Box office: ₹102.5 crore

Dilwale Dulhania Le Jayenge (transl. The Brave-Hearted Will Take the Bride), also known by the initialism DDLJ, is a 1995 Indian Hindi-language romantic musical film written and directed by Aditya Chopra (in his directorial debut) and produced by his father Yash Chopra. The film stars Shah Rukh Khan and Kajol as Raj and Simran, two young non-resident Indians, who fall in love during a vacation through Europe with their friends. Raj tries to win over Simran's family so the couple can marry, but Simran's father has long since promised her hand to his friend's son.

The film was shot in India, London, and Switzerland, from September 1994 to August 1995.

With an estimated total gross of ₹102.5 crore (US$10.75 million; today's adjusted gross ₹1,115 crore (US$116.97 million)), with ₹89 crore (US$9.34 million; today's adjusted gross ₹970 crore (US$101.76 million)) earned in India and ₹13.50 crore (US$1.42 million; today's adjusted gross ₹147 crore (US$15.42 million)) in overseas, the film was the highest-grossing Indian film of 1995 and one of the most successful Indian films in history. When adjusted for inflation, it is the second highest-grossing Indian film of the 1990s, behind Hum Aapke Hain Koun..! It won 10 Filmfare Awards—the most for a single film at that time—and the National Film Award for Best Popular Film Providing Wholesome Entertainment. Its soundtrack album became one of the most popular of the 1990s.

Dilwale Dulhania Le Jayenge was released on 20 October 1995, and received widespread acclaim from critics. Many critics praised the performances of Kajol and Khan as well as their chemistry, and the film's blend of simultaneously promoting strong family values and the following of one's own heart. Its success led other filmmakers to target the non-resident Indian audience, which was deemed more lucrative for them. It spawned many imitations of its story and style and homages to specific scenes. Dilwale Dulhania Le Jayenge was one of only three Hindi films in the reference book 1001 Movies You Must See Before You Die, and was placed twelfth on the British Film Institute's list of top Indian films of all time. In 2012, the film was included by critics Rachel Dwyer and Sanam Hasan in the 2012 British Film Institute Sight & Sound 1,000 greatest films of all time. The film is considered to be the longest-running film in the history of Indian cinema, as it is still being shown at the Maratha Mandir in Mumbai since its release on 20 October 1995, as of January 2026.

== Plot ==
Raj and Simran are British Indians living in London. Simran is a shy, reserved woman whose life is strictly dictated by her traditional patriarch father, Baldev. Raj, by contrast, is a brash young man raised by a wealthy, carefree businessman who encourages his son to enjoy his youth. The two cross paths at the start of a backpacking trip across Europe when a late Simran receives Raj's help to board a moving train at the last minute.

Initially annoyed by Raj's flirtatious behavior, Simran ignores him once she reunites with her friends. However, fate continuously brings their travel groups together until Raj and Simran both accidentally miss their connecting train to Zurich. Forced to travel through Europe alone to catch up with their friends, the two gradually open up to one another. Raj reveals his nomadic, unsettled view of life, while Simran shares that she has been betrothed since childhood to Kuljeet, a man from Punjab whom she has never met. By the end of the journey, Simran falls deeply in love with Raj. Raj realizes he reciprocates her feelings, but heartbroken by the reality of her upcoming arranged marriage, he declines her invitation to the wedding.

A few weeks later, Simran's family relocates to Punjab to finalize the wedding preparations. Simran is immediately repulsed by Kuljeet’s arrogant and chauvinistic behavior, but she quietly endures it out of respect for her father. The situation shifts dramatically when Kuljeet brings home his new friend from London—who is revealed to be Raj. Kuljeet is entirely oblivious to the fact that Raj has traveled to India with the sole purpose of winning over Simran's family rather than eloping. Raj systematically embeds himself within the household, charming Simran's relatives with his warmth and helpful nature. Though Baldev recognizes Raj from a previous encounter at his convenience store in London, he remains initially unaware of the romance.

The wedding date is unexpectedly brought forward to fulfill the final wishes of Simran’s ailing grandmother. Even when Simran's mother discovers the truth and begs the couple to run away, Raj stubbornly refuses, insisting that he will only marry Simran with her father's blessing. The following morning, Baldev uncovers Raj and Simran's secret. Enraged by the deception and determined to protect his family's honor, Baldev violently confronts Raj and orders him to leave the village immediately.

Raj heads to the local railway station, where an enraged Kuljeet and his henchmen ambush him to exact revenge for the betrayal. A brutal fight ensues, but Raj ultimately overpowers the group. Sparing Kuljeet's life, a battered Raj boards the departing train. Meanwhile, Baldev and the family arrive at the platform. Simran desperately begs her father to let her be with the man she loves. Watching the train pull away, Baldev finally relents, realizing that forcing his daughter into marriage with Kuljeet will permanently ruin her happiness. Mirroring their very first encounter, Simran runs along the platform as the train gains speed, and Raj reaches out from the compartment door, pulling her aboard to begin their new life together in London.

== Cast ==
- Shah Rukh Khan as Raj Malhotra
- Kajol as Simran Singh
- Amrish Puri as Chaudhary Baldev Singh, Simran and Chutki's father
- Farida Jalal as Lajwant "Lajjo" Singh, Simran and Chutki's mother
- Anupam Kher as Dharamvir Malhotra, Raj's father
- Parmeet Sethi as Kuljeet Singh, Simran's fiancee
- Mandira Bedi as Preeti Singh, Kuljeet's sister
- Satish Shah as Ajit Singh, Baldev's friend and Kuljeet's father
- Himani Shivpuri as Kammo Kaur, Simran's aunt
- Pooja Ruparel as Rajeshwari "Chutki" Singh, Simran's sister
- Achala Sachdev as Simran's grandmother
- Damyanti Puri as Kuljeet's mother
- Lalit Tiwari as Simran's uncle
- Anaita Shroff Adajania as Sheena, Simran's friend
- Hemlata Deepak as Simran's friend
- Karan Johar as Ponchi, Raj's friend
- Arjun Sablok as Rocky, Raj's friend

== Production ==
=== Development ===
Having assisted his father, filmmaker Yash Chopra, during the making of Chandni (1989), Lamhe (1991) and Darr (1993), Aditya Chopra wrote several screenplays of his own, including one originally intended as his directorial debut that would eventually become his second film Mohabbatein (2000). He subsequently spent three years developing a story that would become Dilwale Dulhania Le Jayenge before approaching his father to direct it. Yash declined and instead persuaded Aditya to direct it himself. During their discussions about the script, Aditya conceived the notion that Raj would seek permission for his marriage from Simran's stern father, rather than eloping with her. With encouragement from his mother, playback singer Pamela Chopra, he decided to make this his directorial debut. Aditya wanted to make a wholesome film with repeat watch value; departing from the cliché cinematic trend where lovers eloped after their parents objected, and show that if their love was strong enough, the parents would eventually understand.

In May 1994, Aditya narrated the first draft of the script to several members of Yash Raj Films' production team assigned to work with him, including a cinematographer, art director, and dialogue writer. Although the crew were largely unimpressed, Aditya stood firm to his ideas. Given full editorial control by his father, the producer, he made the film according to his own tastes and sensibilities. During pre-production, Aditya struggled developing words that were ''young-sounded'' with dialogue writer Javed Siddiqui and lyricist Anand Bakshi, which led to creative friction. There were disputes over writing credits on the final script. Pamela's friend, actress and screenwriter Honey Irani, felt she deserved a writing credit she did not receive; while Siddiqui deemed that Aditya did not deserve partial credit for the dialogue; neither worked with Yash Raj Films again. While Yash approved the script and was consulted about the music, he largely delegated the creative process to his son, and has firmly denied that he ghost directing the project, noting he did not shoot a single frame and did not view portions of the film unit it was nearly completed.

=== Casting ===
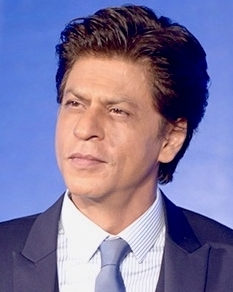
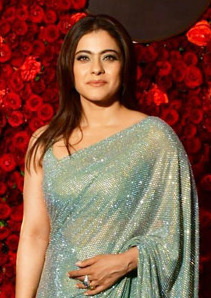
Dilwale Dulhania Le Jayenge marked the third collaboration between Shah Rukh Khan and Kajol following Baazigar (1993) and Karan Arjun (1995).

Aditya originally conceived the narrative as a cross-cultural romance between an Indian and American. He contemplated casting Tom Cruise for the male lead, however he was dissuaded by Yash, who advised against casting a foreign star. As a result, they decided to make the characters non-resident Indians (NRI's). Aditya offered the role of Raj to Shah Rukh Khan, however he was reluctant to accept a romantic lead after finding success playing villainous roles. Saif Ali Khan also declined the role as he lacked confidence playing romantic leads, causing Aditya to continue pursuing Shah Rukh. (Note: Other sources claim that Saif was approached for the role before Shah Rukh, so this point is not entirely clear.) Aditya and Shah Rukh had four meetings over several weeks; he finally convinced him by telling him that he could never become a superstar unless he became ''every woman's dream man and every mother's dream son''. Khan later credited Aditya with making him a star through the role. He noted fellow actor Salman Khan also encouraged him to do the role, believing the film would be very successful. Shah Rukh Khan has also noted similarities in the film's script to his own relationship his wife his wife, Gauri Khan, before their marriage.

Kajol was Aditya's first choice for the role of Simran, to which she quickly agreed. Having previously worked with Shah Rukh Khan in Baazigar (1993) and Karan Arjun (1995), she noted she found it difficult to relate to Simran's personality, whereas Khan stated his character, Raj, closely reflected his own demeanour. Aditya named the character Raj and chose the mandolin out of admiration for actor Raj Kapoor. Following a successful screen test, Parmeet Sethi was chosen over Armaan Kohli and Milind Gunaji for the role of Kuljeet, Simran's fiancée. Aditya asked for two additional assistants, his younger brother Uday Chopra along with cousin Karan Johar alongside assistant director Sameer Sharma. Johar also played a minor role in the film as Raj's friend. Sharmishta Roy was the film's art director and Manish Malhotra was the costume designer. Although Malhotra had proposed several new ideas, Aditya wanted to keep the clothing style simple; he did not want it to distract from the story. Nevertheless, Malhotra was responsible for the idea of Simran wearing a green dress in the song "Mehndi Laga Ke Rakhna", an unusual colour for a Punjabi bride.

=== Filming ===
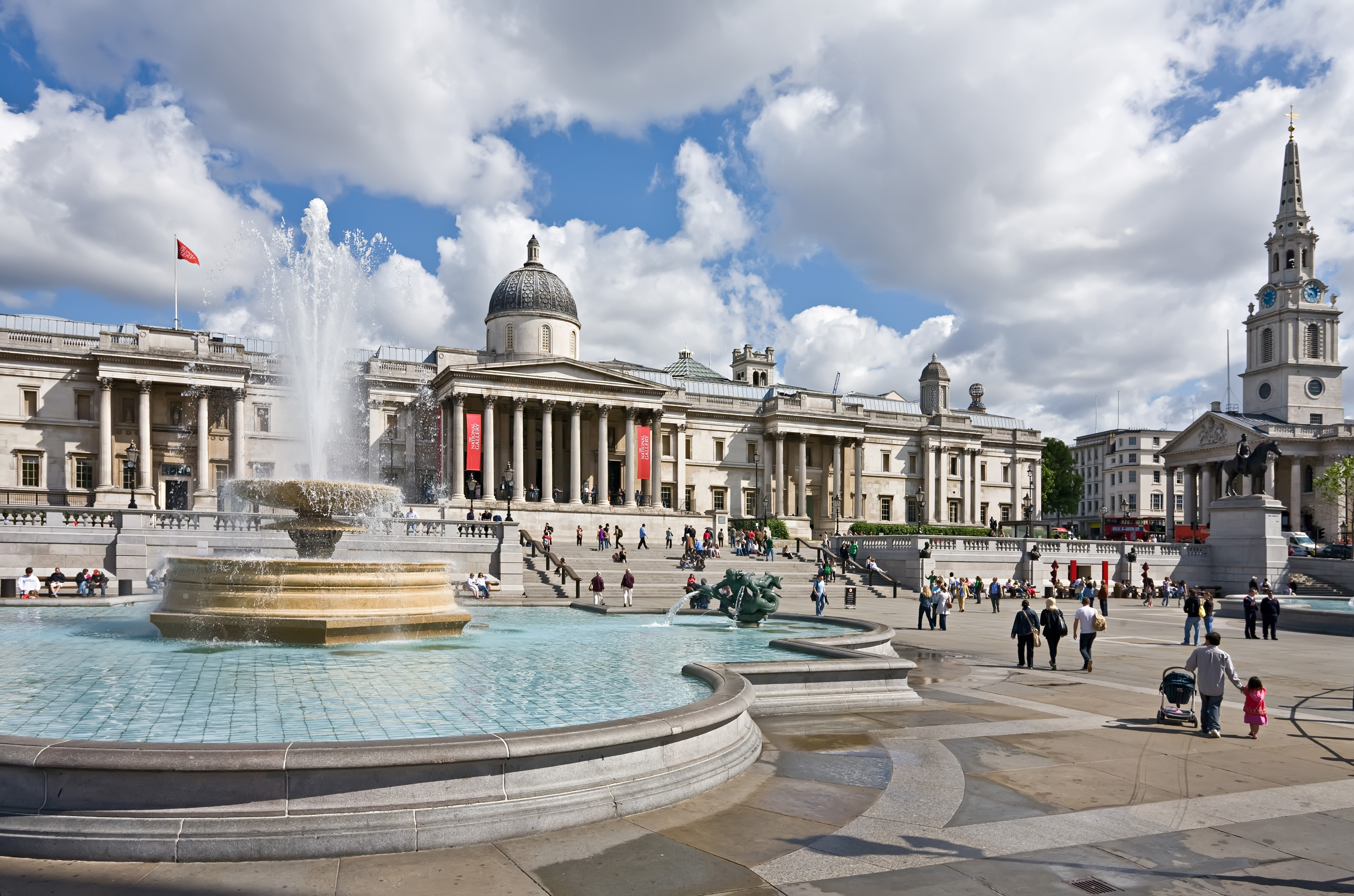
Trafalgar Square where the film's opening sequence featuring Amrish Puri was filmed.

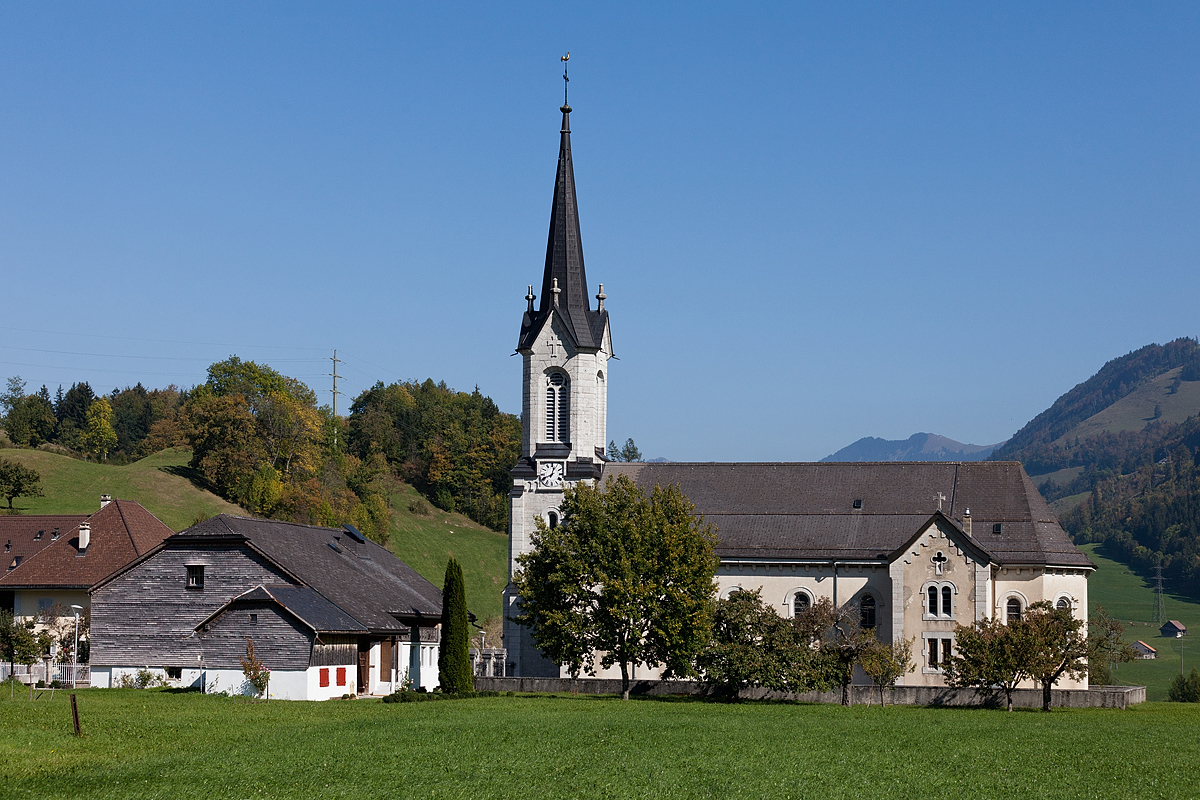
The Church of Saint Grat in Montbovon, one of the filming locations in Switzerland.

Dilwale Dulhania Le Jayenge was filmed in several 5, 10, and 20-day schedules between September 1994 and August 1995. The first sequence filmed was for the song "Ho Gaya Hai Tujhko" with Kajol and Shah Rukh in Switzerland. The European journey scenes and songs were mainly filmed in Saanen, Montbovon and Gstaad, Switzerland. Other scenes were shot in England, at locations including Trafalgar Square, King's Cross railway station and Angel Underground station. Cinematographer Manmohan Singh, a regular collaborator with Chopra, shot the song "Tujhe Dekha To", including the iconic mustard fields scenes with Shah Rukh and Kajol in the mustard fields in Gurgaon on the outskirts of the National Capital Region Delhi. The cast faced difficulties while filming the final scene, which shows Simran running to catch the train on which Raj is travelling. The smouldering heat made it difficult to shoot and each time there was a retake, the train took 20 minutes to return.

Saroj Khan was the choreographer throughout most of the production, but after several disputes between her and Aditya, she was replaced by Farah Khan near the end of the shoot. After the film's eventual success, Saroj apologised to Aditya for underestimating him, but she never worked with him again. Farah choreographed the song "Ruk Ja O Dil Deewane", during which Aditya did not tell Kajol that Shah Rukh was going to drop her, as he wanted to capture her genuine reaction. The film's title was suggested by actress Kirron Kher; it came from the song "Le Jayenge Le Jayenge", in the film Chor Machaye Shor (1974). Raj sings parts of this song during the story, and it recurs at the end. Dilwale Dulhania Le Jayenge is believed to be the first Bollywood film with a "Title suggested by" credit. The film has since become universally known by the acronym DDLJ.

Towards the end of the principal photography, Shah Rukh had to split his time between this film and Trimurti (1995), spending half of his day on each film. In early August 1995, when filming on Dilwale Dulhania Le Jayenge was not yet finished, a release date in October around the time of the Diwali festival was decided upon. Composers Jatin and Lalit Pandit were given only 10 days to complete the background score, and the first copies were printed on 30 September. After filming was complete, Aditya decided to make a Hollywood-style documentary of the film-making process, which had not been done before in India. Karan Johar and Uday were put in charge because they had already been recording some of the processes. On 18 October, two days before the film's release, the 30-minute special Dilwale Dulhania Le Jayenge, The Making was broadcast on television by Doordarshan.

== Themes ==
Dilwale Dulhania Le Jayenge repeats the usual conservative agenda of family, courtship and marriage, but it proposes that Indian family values are portable assets that can be upheld regardless of country of residence. To prove this, Raj, an NRI who was brought up in London, is portrayed as the story's "good guy", whereas Kuljeet, raised in India, is portrayed as the villain. This is a reversal of the roles in typical Indian films, which usually portray Indians as being morally superior to Westerners. Here, NRIs are validated as potential model Indian citizens.

The story aims to capture the struggle between traditional family values and the modern value of individualism. Although Raj and Simran want to be together regardless of her father's plans for her, Raj tries to win over his girlfriend's father rather than simply eloping with her. In this and other Indian stories, family values are ultimately considered more important than the romantic plot. Moral values and rules of conduct take precedence over individual desires. The film implies that "Indianness" can be defined by the importance of family life; whether at home or abroad, it is the Indian family system that is recognised as the social institution that most defines Indian identity.

In Dilwale Dulhania Le Jayenge, the purity/sanctity of women is being related to that of the nation. In the scene after Raj and Simran spend the night together, and Simran is concerned that something happened, Raj tells her: "You think I am beyond values, but I am a Hindustani, and I know what a Hindustani girl's izzat (honour) is worth. Trust me, nothing happened last night." This speaks to the Indian diaspora and their need to try to sustain their value system, and the man's responsibility to protect the Indian woman's sexual purity. In The Routledge Encyclopedia of Films, Ranjani Mazumdar says the film has a running theme of unfulfilled desires, which is exemplified by Raj's father telling him to enjoy life because his own was a struggle, and Simran's mother telling her to run away with Raj because she was unable to live her own dreams.

Scott Jordan Harris, writing for Roger Ebert's website, says the film's popularity lies in its ability to effectively convey two opposing themes appealing to different portions of society. He said, "It argues that we should follow our hearts and chase happiness wherever it leads, regardless of the obstacles in our paths, while simultaneously suggesting we should respect the ways of our elders, particularly our parents, and do nothing that challenges their will". Rachel Dwyer said the film was important for presenting marriage as an understanding between parents and children. While fighting the old tradition of the arranged marriage, it still encouraged the importance of seeking parental consent, even for a love marriage. According to Patricia Uberoi, Dilwale Dulhania Le Jayenge reiterates the theme of Hum Aapke Hain Koun..! (1994) (Note: Uberoi states the theme to be that the lovers were willing to sacrifice their own feelings for their families.) in a self-conscious manner while also linking it explicitly to the fact that the protagonists tend to remind themselves and each other of what it means to be an Indian.

Writing for Himal Southasian, film critic Anna Vetticad noted that the movie's charms lent a deceptive lustre to its ultra-conservatism, which helped pave the way for the brazen misogyny and Hindu nationalism in Indian cinema 30 years later. She writes: "DDLJ’s defining moment comes when Raj’s father exhorts him to stop Simran’s marriage. Raj refuses, saying, “Things were different in your time.” A young person telling an older person that revolt is passé is an odd inter-generational turning of the tables. Raj was effectively announcing the death of the Angry Young Man and the advent of a pro-establishment hero."

Sandra Ponzanesi has noted the thematic similarities with The Sure Thing (1985), as the movie follows a college student who embarks on a cross-country trip in hopes of a casual romantic encounter, but ends up traveling with a young woman. Initially at odds, the two gradually fall in love. She also highlighted that, while the basic storyline resembles that of Dilwale Dulhania Le Jayenge, the cultural context and details differ significantly.

== Music ==
The Dilwale Dulhania Le Jayenge soundtrack features seven songs composed by Jatin–Lalit, a duo consisting of the brothers Jatin and Lalit Pandit. Anand Bakshi wrote the lyrics and Lata Mangeshkar, Asha Bhosle, Kumar Sanu, Abhijeet Bhattacharya and Udit Narayan performed the vocals. Jatin–Lalit was considered for the job when singer Asha Bhosle contacted Yash Chopra after meeting the duo. It was their first collaboration with Yash Raj Films. They secured the job after singing "Mehndi Laga Ke Rakhna" for Yash. In return, they ensured she sang one song, "Zara Sa Jhoom Loon Main". Pamela Chopra helped them select tunes and instruments to give some of the songs a Punjabi flavour.

The soundtrack became the best-selling Bollywood soundtracks with sales ranging from 25 million to over 100 million. In 2005, the album was judged the top Hindi soundtrack of all time by voters on the BBC Asian Network website. The wedding song "Mehndi Laga Ke Rakhna" from the film became an all-time hit; it is played at weddings across the South Asian diaspora.

=== Track listing ===
Dilwale Dulhania Le Jayenge (Original Motion Picture Soundtrack)
No.	Title	Singers	Length
1.	"Ghar Aaja Pardesi"	Manpreet Kaur, Pamela Chopra	7:32
2.	"Mere Khwabon Mein"	Lata Mangeshkar	4:18
3.	"Zara Sa Jhoom Loon Main"	Asha Bhosle, Abhijeet Bhattacharya	5:55
4.	"Tujhe Dekha Toh"	Lata Mangeshkar, Kumar Sanu	5:05
5.	"Mehndi Laga Ke Rakhna"	Lata Mangeshkar, Udit Narayan	4:51
6.	"Ruk Ja O Dil Deewane"	Udit Narayan	5:14
7.	"Ho Gaya Hai Tujhko"	Lata Mangeshkar, Udit Narayan	5:51

== Release ==
Dilwale Dulhania Le Jayenge opened on 20 October 1995 to sold-out shows worldwide. Every show in every theatre in Mumbai—save one—was completely full for the first week. The film was popular among both resident Indians and NRIs. At San Francisco's 720-seat Naz theatre, 1,000 people arrived for the first showing, and the theatre staff were forced to run another show late that night. In the UK, the film ran for over a year. Dilwale Dulhania Le Jayenge has been shown daily since its release on 20 October 1995 at Maratha Mandir in Mumbai as of January 2026.

The film was theatrically re-released in India on 10 February 2023, earning ₹10 lakh on the opening day and over ₹22.50 lakh in the first weekend run.

It is available to stream on Netflix since 1 November, 2025.

== Reception ==
=== Box office ===
The film opened with over ₹800 million (US$24.67 million) grossed in its first month of release. The film's initial Hindi run earned ₹1.13 billion (valued at about US$35,000,000 in 1995) (Note: The exchange rate in 1995 was 32.35 Indian rupees (₹) per 1 US dollar (US$).) in India and about ₹200 million (valued at about US$6,200,000 in 1995) overseas; it became the highest-grossing Indian film of the year, and the second-highest-grossing film of the 1990s, behind Hum Aapke Hain Koun..! It was the second Indian film to gross over ₹1 billion worldwide, and one of the biggest Bollywood earners of all time. The film went on to gross a total of ₹2 billion ($60 million) worldwide as of 1996.

Adjusted for inflation, Dilwale Dulhania Le Jayenge is among the highest-grossing Hindi films ever; its domestic net income (₹533 million at the time) is approximately ₹4.613 billion ($48 million) when adjusted for inflation in 2017. As of 2009, the film had generated over ₹60 million in revenues for the Maratha Mandir since its release. In later years, that theatre ran one matinee show per day at reduced ticket prices, which averaged about 50% occupancy.

=== Critical reception ===
On the review aggregator website Rotten Tomatoes, 100% of 6 critics' reviews are positive.

Dilwale Dulhania Le Jayenge received many favourable reviews. An initial review by weekly magazine Screen said of Aditya Chopra, "A young master arrives". Tom Vick, reviewing the film for Allmovie, said, "An immensely likeable movie, Dilwale Dulhania Le Jayenge performs the rarely achieved feat of stretching a predictable plot over three hours and making every minute enjoyable." When the film toured the US in 2004 as part of the Cinema India showcase, "The Changing Face of Indian Cinema", Charles Taylor reviewed the film for Salon and said, "It's a flawed, contradictory movie—aggressive and tender, stiff and graceful, clichéd and fresh, sophisticated and naive, traditional and modern. It's also, I think, a classic."

Writing for NDTV, Anupama Chopra said, "Perhaps the innocence of Raj and Simran's romance in which they can spend the night together without sex because Raj, the bratish [sic] NRI understands the importance of an Indian woman's honor. Perhaps it's the way in which the film artfully reaffirms the patriarchal status quo and works for all constituencies—the NRI and the local viewer. Or perhaps it's the magic of Shah Rukh Khan and Kajol who created a template for modern love, which was hip and cool but resolutely Indian." She also called the film a milestone that shaped Hindi cinema through the 1990s, and one of her personal favourites. In 2004, Meor Shariman of The Malay Mail called the film a "must watch" for Bollywood fans, and also for those seeking an introduction to Bollywood.

Raja Sen gave a reflective review for Rediff.com in 2005, calling the film one of the best Hindi films made in the previous 20 years. He said "Shah Rukh Khan gives a fabulous performance, redefining the Lover for the 1990s with great panache", and called Kajol a "real-as-life actress bringing warmth and credulity" to her role. Sen called the film well balanced and said only the fight scene and some mother-daughter dialogue can wear after multiple viewings. Omer M. Mozaffar, writing for RogerEbert.com in 2012, likened the film to a Disney Princess story, saying, "the young princess feeling trapped by the traditional patriarchy, seeking freedom through discovering the world, but finally finding it through silent, but inappropriate love. The Little Mermaid. Beauty (of the Beast). Jasmine (friends with Aladdin). Pocahontas. Aurora (Sleeping Beauty). And here, Simran." Scott Jordan Harris, also writing for RogerEbert.com in 2014, called it "one of the world's favorite films", and said it plays as a masterful soap opera, with one of the best screen couples ever seen.

== Accolades ==
Dilwale Dulhania Le Jayenge was ranked among The Times of India's list of the "10 Bollywood movies you must see before you die". It was one of three Hindi films in the film reference book 1001 Movies You Must See Before You Die, the others being Mother India (1957) and Deewaar (1975). It was placed twelfth on the British Film Institute's list of top Indian films of all time. It is one of the films on Box Office India's list of "Biggest Blockbusters Ever in Hindi Cinema". The film won a National Film Award and 10 Filmfare Awards, setting the record at the time for the most Filmfare trophies. (Note: The record has since been tied by Devdas (2002), and broken by Black (2005).)

Awards and nominations for Dilwale Dulhania Le Jayenge
Awards	Category	Nominee	Result	Ref(s)
43rd National Film Awards	Best Popular Film Providing Wholesome Entertainment	Yash Chopra, Aditya Chopra	Won	
41st Filmfare Awards	Best Film	Yash Chopra	Won	
41st Filmfare Awards	Best Director	Aditya Chopra	Won	
41st Filmfare Awards	Best Actor	Shah Rukh Khan	Won	
41st Filmfare Awards	Best Actress	Kajol	Won	
41st Filmfare Awards	Best Male Playback Singer	Udit Narayan for "Mehndi Laga Ke Rakhna"	Won	
41st Filmfare Awards	Best Supporting Actress	Farida Jalal	Won	
41st Filmfare Awards	Best Comedian	Anupam Kher	Won	
41st Filmfare Awards	Best Lyricist	Anand Bakshi for "Tujhe Dekha To"	Won	
41st Filmfare Awards	Best Screenplay	Aditya Chopra	Won	
41st Filmfare Awards	Best Dialogue	Aditya Chopra, Javed Siddiqui	Won	
41st Filmfare Awards	Best Supporting Actor	Amrish Puri	Nominated	
41st Filmfare Awards	Best Music Director	Jatin–Lalit	Nominated	
41st Filmfare Awards	Best Male Playback Singer	Kumar Sanu for "Tujhe Dekha To"	Nominated	
41st Filmfare Awards	Best Lyricist	Anand Bakshi for "Ho Gaya Hai Tujhko To Pyaar Sajna"	Nominated	
Screen Awards	Best Film	Yash Chopra	Won	
Screen Awards	Best Director	Aditya Chopra	Won	
Screen Awards	Best Actor	Shah Rukh Khan	Won	

== Legacy ==
=== Box-office run ===
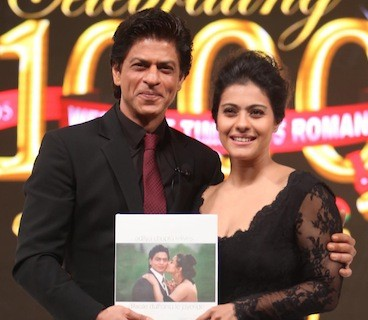
Shah Rukh Khan and Kajol celebrating 1000 weeks of continuous showing of Dilwale Dulhania Le Jayenge in 2014

In 2001, Dilwale Dulhania Le Jayenge overtook Sholay (1975), which had run for over five years at the Minerva theatre, as the longest-running film in Indian cinema history. It has been showing at the Maratha Mandir theatre (which was famous for having shown Mughal-e-Azam (1960) for three years) since its original release in 1995. There are often people in the audience who have seen the film 50 or more times, but still clap, cheer, mouth the dialogues and sing along with the songs, raising comparisons with The Rocky Horror Picture Show (1975), the longest -running film in the United States.

When a theatre strike in early 2011 threatened the film's uninterrupted run, the producer Yash Chopra contacted theatre owners to try to ensure the film would continue. He hoped the film would continue to run for at least 1,000 weeks, which it achieved in December 2014. To commemorate the event, cast members including Shah Rukh Khan, Kajol, Anupam Kher, Farida Jalal, Mandira Bedi and Pooja Ruparel appeared on the television show Comedy Nights with Kapil. Shah Rukh Khan, Kajol and director Aditya Chopra also attended a live chat with fans and a black tie event at the theatre on 12 December. The same day, they launched a coffee table book written by Aditya Chopra about the making of the film. In December, Yash Raj Films announced the availability of a collection of commemorative, licensed merchandise from various suppliers to mark the event.

The Maratha Mandir's management announced it would end the film's run after 1,009 weeks on 19 February 2015 due to low attendance (the last show was viewed by 210 people). However, after an outpouring of support from fans, and talks with the production company, they decided to reinstate the film. By March 16, 2020, it had been shown for 1,251 weeks (24 years), and the film continued to be screened as of 2023. The projectionist, who has been working at the Mandir for 46 years, has watched the film more than 9,000 times. The COVID-19 lockdown in India caused the theater to close for eight months; upon its re-opening in November 2020, screenings of the film resumed.

=== Influence ===
Kajol and Shah Rukh Khan in the climactic train scene.

Dilwale Dulhania Le Jayenge spawned many imitators of its story and style, especially throughout the 1990s. According to the Encyclopaedia of Hindi Cinema, it and a handful of other films and young directors started a trend for "designer" films. The authors said that these were "a carefully packaged and branded product in which every little visual and physical detail ... is of utmost importance". In Bollywood's Top 20: Superstars of Indian Cinema, Namrata Joshi said Dilwale Dulhania Le Jayenge "reinvented Bollywood romances so decisively that we can neatly divide them into two eras—before DDLJ and after DDLJ".

Yash Raj Films was previously known for using locations outside India for item numbers in its films. Dilwale Dulhania Le Jayenge started the trend for films designed to appeal to the Indian diaspora, which have foreign locations as integral parts of the story. The characters are themselves diaspora and tend to be able to move with ease between India and the West. Some later films that followed this trend include Pardes (1997), Dil Chahta Hai (2001), Kabhi Khushi Kabhie Gham (2001), Kal Ho Naa Ho (2003), Hum Tum (2004), Salaam Namaste (2005), and Kabhi Alvida Naa Kehna (2006). Dilwale Dulhania Le Jayenge became the first Hindi film blockbuster to feature NRIs as main characters. It helped to establish the diaspora market as a vital source of revenue for the industry; that market was seen as a safer financial investment than the desi market.

Several later films have paid homage to Dilwale Dulhania Le Jayenge. The Karan Johar-produced Humpty Sharma Ki Dulhania (2014) was directly inspired by it. The films Bangaram (2006), Jab We Met (2007), Bodyguard (2011), Chalo Dilli (2011), Yeh Jawaani Hai Deewani (2013) and Chennai Express (2013) include scenes similar to the climactic train sequence, wherein a woman is running to catch a moving train and is helped aboard by a man with his outstretched arm. The British film Slumdog Millionaire (2008) contained a similar train scene, and its final dance sequence was partially shot at the same railway station as the Dilwale Dulhania Le Jayenge finale. The independent film A Nice Indian Boy is influenced by DDLJ, featuring multiple references and direct clips from the Bollywood classic.

In October 2021, Aditya announced that he would be directing a Broadway musical entitled Come Fall In Love – The DDLJ Musical, based on the film. It will debut in the Broadway season of 2022–2023.

=== Impact ===
Audiences appreciated the screen chemistry between Shah Rukh Khan and Kajol, who later worked together in several successful films including Kuch Kuch Hota Hai (1998), Kabhi Khushi Kabhie Gham (2001), My Name Is Khan (2010), and Dilwale (2015), and are often referred to as one of Indian cinema's most loved on-screen couples. Sogosurvey conducted an online survey in 2016 in which approximately 47% of the people who participated voted Dilwale Dulhania Le Jayenge as Bollywood's most evergreen love story. Shah Rukh Khan credits this film with making him a star, and says it "changed the entire scene for romantic movies of the 90s". During an interview in 2002, he said "Whatever I'll stand for as an actor, in the whole of my career, whenever it ends, it will start with and end at Dilwale". The actress Farida Jalal said the film gave her career a boost, saying she got many offers and "could quote any price". It also helped the young careers of Pooja Ruparel, who received advertising offers, and of Sharmistha Roy.

The British Film Institute (BFI) commissioned a book about Dilwale Dulhania Le Jayenge. It was the first Hindi film chosen for a series of studies on international films, called "BFI Modern Classics". The author was Anupama Chopra and the book was released in 2002. It was reissued in paperback by Harper-Collins as Dilwale Dulhania Le Jayenge: The Making of a Blockbuster in 2004. After an unexpectedly long delay, the film was released on DVD by Yash Raj Films in 2002. The release included The Making and 300 Weeks Celebration documentaries, Success Story (highlights from the film's premiere), clips from the 41st Filmfare Awards ceremony and other interviews.

In 2006, members of the film crew were honoured at a dinner event to celebrate the film's 500th week since release. It was hosted by the Consulate General of Switzerland in Mumbai and by Switzerland Tourism. In 2010, Yash Raj Films signed an agreement with Indian and Swiss tour companies to provide a tour package called "YRF Enchanted Journey", to allow visitors to Switzerland to view filming locations used for famous Yash Raj films including Dilwale Dulhania Le Jayenge. In 2014, Yash Raj Films released Aditya Chopra Relives ... Dilwale Dulhania Le Jayenge (As Told to Nasreen Munni Kabir), an attractive but expensive book about the making of the film. In response to Indian prime minister Narendra Modi quoting the line "May the force be with you" from the American film franchise Star Wars during a visit to the United States, the then US President Barack Obama decided to quote a line from a Hindi film during his visit to India in January 2015. He chose a line from this film, "Senorita, bade bade deshon mein ..." (Miss, in large countries ...), and added "you know what I mean". In February 2020, the then US President Donald Trump mentioned Dilwale Dulhania Le Jayenge as a classic Indian film during his visit to India. In the same month, the Australian actor Chris Hemsworth recited the complete dialogue "Bade bade deshon mein aisi chhoti chhoti baatein hoti rehti hai" (Small things like this happen in big countries), and said that he is a fan of the film.

== See also ==
- Indian cinema and Switzerland

== Bibliography ==
- Chatterjee, Saibal (2003). "1990–2001: Designer Cinema". In Ramchandani, Indu (ed.). Encyclopaedia of Hindi Cinema. Encyclopædia Britannica, Inc. pp. 117–134. ISBN 978-81-7991-066-5.
- Chopra, Anupama (2002). Dilwale Dulhania Le Jayenge. British Film Institute, London. ISBN 978-0-85170-957-4.
- Dengel-Janic, Ellen; Eckstein, Lars (2008). "Bridehood Revisited: Disarming Concepts of Gender and Culture in Recent Asian British Film". In Eckstein, Lars; Korte, Barbara; Pirker, Eva Ulrike; et al. (eds.). Multi-Ethnic Britain 2000+: New Perspectives in Literature, Film and the Arts. Rodopi. pp. 45–64. ISBN 978-90-420-2497-7.
- Dwyer, Rachel (2014). Bollywood's India: Hindi Cinema as a Guide to Contemporary India. Reaktion Books, London. ISBN 978-1-78023-304-8.
- Ganti, Tejaswini (2004). Bollywood: A Guidebook to Popular Hindi Cinema. Psychology Press. ISBN 978-0-415-28854-5. Archived from the original on 10 April 2023.
- Joshi, Namrata (2012). "Shahrukh Khan: Yuppie Prince of Liberalized India". In Patel, Bhaichand (ed.). Bollywood's Top 20: Superstars of Indian Cinema. Penguin Books, India. pp. 231–242. ISBN 978-0-670-08572-9. Archived from the original on 18 April 2023.
- Mazumdar, Ranjani (2014). "Dilwale Dulhania Le Jayenge / The Brave-Hearted Will Take Away the Bride". In Barrow, Sarah; Haenni, Sabine; White, John (eds.). The Routledge Encyclopedia of Films. Routledge, New York. pp. 205–208. ISBN 978-1-317-68261-5.
- Mehta, Rini Bhattacharya (2011). "Bollywood, Nation, Globalization: An Incomplete Introduction". In Mehta, Rini Bhattacharya; Pandharipande, Rajeshwari V. (eds.). Bollywood and Globalization: Indian Popular Cinema, Nation, and Diaspora. Anthem Press. pp. 1–14. ISBN 978-0-85728-782-3. Archived from the original on 26 July 2023.
- Punathambekar, Aswin (2005). "Bollywood in the Indian-American Diaspora: Mediating a Transitive Logic of Cultural Citizenship" (PDF). International Journal of Cultural Studies. 8 (2): 151–173. doi:10.1177/1367877905052415. S2CID 145205351. Archived from the original (PDF) on 4 March 2016.
- Ramchandani, Indu, ed. (2003). "Biographies". Encyclopaedia of Hindi Cinema. Encyclopædia Britannica, Inc. pp. 515–640. ISBN 978-81-7991-066-5. Archived from the original on 11 January 2023.
- Mukherjee, Madhuja (2012) [2011]. "Mustard Fields, Exotic Tropes, and Travels through Meandering Pathways: Reframing the Yash Raj Trajectory". In Roy, Anjali Gera; Chua, Beng Huat (eds.). Travels of Bollywood Cinema: From Bombay to LA. Oxford University Press. pp. 35–54. doi:10.1093/acprof:oso/9780198075981.003.0004. ISBN 978-0-19-807598-1.
- Sarrazin, Natalie (2008). "Songs from the Heart – Musical Coding, Emotional Sentiment, and Traditional Sonic Identity in India's Popular Film Music". In Kavoori, Anandam P.; Punathambekar, Aswin (eds.). Global Bollywood. New York University Press. pp. 203–219. ISBN 978-0-8147-4798-8. Archived from the original on 26 July 2023.
- Uberoi, Patricia (1997). "The Diaspora Comes Home: Disciplining Desire in DDLJ" (PDF). Contributions to Indian Sociology. 32 (2): 305–336. doi:10.1177/006996679803200208. S2CID 146570568. Archived (PDF) from the original on 9 February 2020.
- Virdi, Jyotika (2003). The Cinematic ImagiNation: Indian Popular Films as Social History. Rutgers University Press. ISBN 978-0-8135-3191-5.
