= List of Guggenheim Fellowships awarded in 2003 =

List of Guggenheim Fellowships awarded in 2003.

== U.S. and Canadian Fellows ==
- Gerard Aching, Associate Professor of Spanish and Portuguese and Director of Graduate Studies, New York University: Black socialist thought and literature in the Caribbean, 1925–1945.
- Diane Ackerman, writer, Ithaca, New York: A poetics of the brain.
- John A. Agnew, Professor of Geography, University of California, Los Angeles: Europe's margins, national territories, and modern statehood.
- Catherine L. Albanese, Professor of Religious Studies, University of California, Santa Barbara: A cultural history of American metaphysical religion.
- Emily Apter, Professor of French and Comparative Literature, New York University: The political and cultural significance of translation.
- Judith F. Baca, artist, Venice, California; Professor of World Arts and Culture, Cesar Chavez Center, University of California, Los Angeles; Founding Artistic Director, Social and Public Art Resource Center (SPARC), Venice: Visual art.
- Zainab Bahrani, Edith Porada Associate Professor of Art History and Archaeology, Columbia University: The body and violence in Assyrian art.
- John Balaban, Professor of English and Poet-in-Residence, North Carolina State University: A translation of Nguyen Du's The Tale of Kieu.
- Patricia Barber, Composer and musician, Chicago: Music composition.
- Eric Montague Beekman, Professor of Germanic Languages, University of Massachusetts Amherst: An edition of the Ambonese Herbal of Rumphius.
- Charles Beitz, Professor of Politics, Princeton University: A political theory of human rights.
- Zoe Beloff, Video Artist, New York City; Adjunct Professor of Media and Communication Arts, City College and Adjunct Professor of Media Culture, College of Staten Island, City University of New York: Video.
- Roland Benabou, Professor of Economics and Public Affairs, Princeton University: Behavioral political economy.
- Carl M. Bender, Professor of Physics, Washington University in St. Louis: A new approach to quantum field theory.
- Maxine Berg, Professor of History, University of Warwick, England: Global origins of British consumer goods in the 18th century.
- Ira Berlin, Distinguished University Professor of History, University of Maryland, College Park: Movement and place in African-American life, 1650–2000.
- April Bernard, poet, New Haven, Connecticut; Professor of Literature and Member of the MFA Core Faculty, Bennington College: Poetry.
- David A. Bradt, Member of the Faculty, Center for International Emergency, Disaster & Refugee Studies, Johns Hopkins University; Member of the Faculty of Emergency Medicine, Royal Melbourne Hospital, Victoria, Australia: The ethnographic study of the Badui tribe of Java.
- Joann Brennan, photographer, Centennial, Colorado; Assistant Professor of Photography, University of Colorado at Denver: Photography.
- Martin Bresnick, composer, New Haven, Connecticut; Adjunct Professor of Composition, Yale University: Music composition.
- Robert H. Brinkmeyer, Jr., Professor of English, University of Arkansas: European totalitarianism and the white Southern imagination, 1930–1950.
- Anthony Brown, composer, Berkeley, California: Music composition.
- Peter Cameron, writer, New York City; Member of the Guest Faculty, Graduate Writing Program, Sarah Lawrence College: Fiction.
- Jim Campbell, artist, San Francisco; Research and Development Engineer, Genesis Microchip, Alviso, California: Visual art.
- Ann Carlson, Choreographer, New York City: Choreography.
- Mary Ellen Carroll, artist, New York City: Visual art.
- Laura L. Carstensen, Professor of Psychology, Stanford University: Extended life expectancy in the 21st century.
- Nicole Cattell, Film Maker, New York City; Director and producer, Swim Pictures and El Sueño Productions, New York City: Film making.
- Siu-Wai Chan, Professor of Materials Science and Engineering, Columbia University: New methods of preparing grain-boundary junctions of high temperature superconductors.
- Jeffrey A. Cina, Professor of Chemistry and Member, Oregon Center for Optics, University of Oregon: Studies in ultrafast electronic energy transfer.
- Robert Cohen, writer, Middlebury, Vermont; Associate Professor of English, Middlebury College: Fiction.
- Tom Conley, Professor of Romance Languages, Harvard University: Topography and literature in Renaissance France.
- Matthew Connelly, Associate Professor of History, Columbia University: A global history of population control.
- Ted Conover, writer, Bronx, New York: A book about roads.
- Perry R. Cook, Associate Professor of Computer Science and Music, Princeton University: Technology and vocal expression.
- Fred Cray, photographer, Brooklyn, New York: Photography.
- Eve D'Ambra, Associate Professor of Art, Vassar College: Beauty and the Roman imperial portrait.
- Arnold I. Davidson, Professor of Philosophy, Divinity and Comparative Literature, University of Chicago: Spiritual exercises in philosophy.
- Michel C. Delfour, Professor of Mathematics and Statistics, Center of Mathematics Research, University of Montreal: Intrinsic theory of thin and asymptotic shells.
- Devin DeWeese, Associate Professor of Central Eurasian Studies and director, Research Institute for Inner Asian Studies, Indiana University Bloomington: A history of the Yasavi Sufi tradition of Central Asia.
- Steve DiBenedetto, artist, New York City; Visiting Artist and lecturer, Rutgers University and Cooper Union for the Advancement of Science and Art: Painting.
- Francis X. Diebold, William Polk Carey Professor of Economics, University of Pennsylvania: Financial asset returns and underlying economic fundamentals.
- Heather Dubrow, Tighe-Evans Professor and John Bascom Professor of English, University of Wisconsin–Madison: The lyric in early modern England.
- Paul N. Edwards, Associate Professor of History and Politics of Technology and director, Science, Technology & Society Program, University of Michigan: The technopolitics of information infrastructure in South Africa.
- Martin B. Einhorn, Professor of Physics, University of Michigan: Quantum field theory in curved spacetime.
- Barbara Alpern Engel, Professor of History, University of Colorado, Boulder: Marriage and the state in late imperial Russia.
- Nathan Englander, writer, New York City: Fiction.
- Helen Epstein, writer, Brooklyn, New York: The AIDS epidemic in Africa.
- Daniel R. Ernst, Professor of Law, Georgetown University: The legal profession and the administrative state in 20th-century America.
- Margaret J. M. Ezell, John Paul Abbott Professor of Liberal Arts, Texas A&M University: Authors, readers, and literary life in Britain, 1645–1714.
- Steven Feld, Professor of Music and Anthropology, Columbia University: The anthropology of global music industrialization.
- James W. Fernandez, Professor Emeritus of Anthropology, University of Chicago: An ethnography of the social imagination in Spain.
- Teresita Fernández, artist, Brooklyn, New York: Sculpture.
- Carter Vaughn Findley, Professor of History, Ohio State University: D'Ohsson and his Tableau général de l'empire othoman.
- Kathleen Finneran, writer, St. Louis, Missouri: Essays about aunts.
- David Froom, composer, California, Maryland; Professor of Music, St. Mary's College of Maryland: Music composition.
- Kenneth M. George, Professor of Anthropology, University of Wisconsin–Madison: Art and post-authoritarian disquiet in Indonesia.
- György Gergely, Professor and Department Head of Developmental Research, Institute for Psychological Research, Hungarian Academy of Sciences, Budapest: The development of understanding other minds and intentionality in infancy.
- Michael Geyer, Professor of History, University of Chicago: The culture of defeat in modern German history.
- Samantha Gillison, writer, Brooklyn, New York: Fiction.
- Neil Goldberg, Video Artist, New York City: Video.
- Irene Good, Research and Curatorial Associate, Peabody Museum of Archaeology and Ethnology, Harvard University: A social archaeology of textiles.
- Monica H. Green, Professor of History, Arizona State University: Medicine and culture in 12th-century Salerno.
- Ariela Gross, Professor of Law and History, University of Southern California Law School: A history of racial identity on trial in America.
- Ted Gup, Shirley Wormser Professor of Journalism, Case Western Reserve University: America's culture of secrecy.
- Susan Hahn, poet, Winnetka, Illinois; Editor, TriQuarterly Literary Magazine, Northwestern University: Poetry.
- Langdon Hammer, Professor of English, Yale University: A biography of James Merrill.
- Helen Hardacre, Reischauer Institute Professor of Japanese Religions and Society, Harvard University: The Japanese organization Science of Happiness.
- Thomas Allen Harris, Film Maker, Brooklyn, New York: Film making.
- John Haugeland, Professor of Philosophy, University of Chicago: An interpretation of Heidegger.
- Aleksandar Hemon, writer, Chicago: Fiction.
- Fred S. Hersch, Composer and Pianist, New York City: Music composition.
- David Hinton, Writer and translator, East Calais, Vermont: A translation of The Book of Songs and of The Mountain Poems of Meng Hao-jan.
- Gitta Honegger, Professor of Theatre and English, Arizona State University: A biography of Helene Weigel.
- C. J. Hribal, writer, Milwaukee, Wisconsin; Professor of English, Marquette University: Fiction.
- Cannon Hudson, artist, New York City: Painting.
- Joseph Michael Hunt, Bank Advisor on Health, Nutrition, and Early Childhood Development, Asian Development Bank, Manila, Philippines: Nutrition security of poor women and children in Asia.
- Neil Immerman, Professor of Computer Science, University of Massachusetts Amherst: Applications of descriptive and dynamic complexity.
- Sheldon H. Jacobson, Professor of Mechanical and Industrial Engineering, Willett Faculty Scholar, and director, Simulation Optimization Laboratory, University of Illinois at Urbana-Champaign: Aviation security problems and solutions.
- Thomas Joiner, Bright-Burton Professor of Psychology, Florida State University: A theory of completed suicide.
- Catherine Julien, Associate Professor of History, Western Michigan University: The Spanish conquest from the perspective of the Inca Titu Cusi.
- John Justeson, Professor of Anthropology, University at Albany, State University of New York: The decipherment of epi-Olmec hieroglyphic writing.
- Susan C. Karant-Nunn, Professor of History and director, Division of Late Medieval and Reformation Studies, University of Arizona: The molding of religious fervor in the German reformations.
- David Scott Kastan, Old Dominion Foundation Professor in the Humanities, Columbia University: Interactions between authors and publishers in early modern England.
- Michael Kazin, Professor of History, Georgetown University: William Jennings Bryan and the rise of celebrity politics in America.
- Timothy A. Keiderling, Professor of Chemistry, University of Illinois at Chicago: Beta-sheet formation in peptides and proteins.
- Mike Kelley, artist, Los Angeles; Member of the Graduate Faculty, Art Center College of Design, Pasadena: Sculpture.
- Sean Dorrance Kelly, assistant professor of philosophy, assistant professor in Neuroscience Program, and Jonathan Edwards Bicentennial Preceptor, Princeton University: Phenomenology, consciousness, and embodiment.
- Dane Kennedy, Elmer Louis Kayser Professor of History and International Affairs, George Washington University: Richard Burton and the Victorian world of difference.
- Justin Kimball, photographer, Florence, Massachusetts; Visiting Assistant Professor of Art and Photography, Amherst College: Photography.
- David Kirby, poet, Tallahassee, Florida; W. Guy McKenzie Professor of English, Florida State University: Poetry.
- Stuart Klawans, Film Critic, The Nation; Vice President and Senior Writer, Kreisberg Group, New York City: The films of Preston Sturges.
- Douglas M. Knight, Jr., Independent Scholar and musician, Portland, Maine: A biography of the Indian dancer Balasaraswati.
- Bill Knott, poet, Cambridge, Massachusetts; Associate Professor of Writing, Literature and Publishing, Emerson College: Poetry.
- Stephan Koplowitz, Choreographer, Brooklyn, New York; Director of Dance, Packer Collegiate Institute, Brooklyn: Choreography.
- Gabriel Kotliar, Professor of Physics, Rutgers University: Studies in correlated electronic structure.
- Karen Ordahl Kupperman, Silver Professor of History, New York University: The founding of Jamestown in its Atlantic context.
- Greg Kwiatek, artist, Hoboken, New Jersey; Senior Security Officer, Metropolitan Museum of Art: Painting.
- Rachel Lachowicz, artist, Los Angeles; Member of the Adjunct Faculty in Art, Claremont Graduate University: Sculpture.
- Nicholas Lamia, artist, New York City; Art Handler and Preparator, Reece Galleries, New York City: Painting.
- Jessie Lebaron, artist, New York City: Painting.
- Thomas Lectka, Professor of Chemistry, Johns Hopkins University: Catalytic asymmetric fluorination reactions.
- Ralph Lee, Theatre Artist, New York City; Artistic Director, Mettawee River Theatre Company, New York City: A theatre piece.
- Phillis Levin, poet, New York City; Professor of English and Poet-in-Residence, Hofstra University: Poetry.
- Neil Levine, Emmet Blakeney Gleason Professor of History of Art and Architecture, Harvard University: The urbanism of Frank Lloyd Wright.
- Steven Z. Levine, Leslie Clark Professor in the Humanities, Bryn Mawr College: Self-representation in France from the 16th century to the present.
- Bong H. Lian, Professor of Mathematics, Brandeis University: Studies in mirror symmetry, geometry, and arithmetic.
- Glenn Ligon, artist, Brooklyn, New York: Painting.
- Brian McAllister Linn, Professor of History, Texas A&M University: War in American military thought.
- Lisa Lowe, Professor of Comparative Literature, University of California, San Diego: The emergence of modern humanism.
- Gina Magid, artist, Brooklyn, New York: Painting.
- Stephanie McCurry, Associate Professor of History, Northwestern University: The body politic in the Civil War South.
- Martha McPhee, writer, New York City; Assistant Professor of Creative Writing, Hofstra University: Fiction.
- Harold Meltzer, composer, New York City; Artistic Director, Sequitur Music Ensemble, New York City: Music composition.
- Christopher L. Miller, Frederick Clifford Ford Professor of African American Studies and French, Yale University: Literatures and cultures of the French-Atlantic slave trade.
- Peter N. Miller, Professor of Cultural History, Bard Graduate Center: The meaning of Fabri de Peiresc's oriental studies.
- Susan Miller, playwright, New York City: Play writing.
- Kenneth L. Mossman, Professor of Health Physics and director, Office of Radiation Safety, Arizona State University: Risk dimensions and precaution.
- Julia K. Murray, Professor of Art History, University of Wisconsin–Madison: The history and significance of the Kongzhai shrine to Confucius.
- Donna J. Nelson, Professor of Chemistry, University of Oklahoma: Mechanisms of additions to alkenes; Nelson Diversity Surveys author.
- Jennifer Nelson, artist, Santa Monica, California; Artist-in-Residence, Siftung Laurenz Haus, Basel Switzerland: Visual art.
- David Nicholas, Kathryn and Calhoun Lemon Professor of History, Clemson University: The regional identity of Germanic Europe, 1270–1500.
- Jan Nijman, Professor of Geography and Regional Studies, University of Miami: Miami as a laboratory of urban living.
- Isidore Okpewho, Professor of Africana Studies, English, and Comparative Literature, Binghamton University, State University of New York: African mythology in the new world.
- Ken Ono, Solle P. and Margaret Manasse Professor of Letters and Science, University of Wisconsin–Madison: Studies in number theory.
- Max Page, Assistant Professor of Architecture and History, University of Massachusetts Amherst: The destruction of New York in the historical imagination.
- Marie Ponsot, poet, New York City; Professor Emerita of English, Queens College, City University of New York: Poetry.
- Yopie Prins, Associate Professor of English and Comparative Literature, University of Michigan: Translations of Greek tragedy by Victorian women.
- Robert N. Proctor, Walter L. and Helen Ferree Professor of the History of Science and co-Director, Science, Medicine and Technology in Culture Initiative, Pennsylvania State University: Acheulean handaxes and human origins.
- Donald Quataert, Professor of History, Binghamton University, State University of New York: The coal miners of the Ottoman Empire, 1829–1922.
- M. V. Ramana, Research Staff Member, Program on Science and Global Security, Princeton University: The present and future of nuclear energy in India.
- Maureen E. Raymo, Research Associate Professor of Earth Sciences, Boston University: An introduction to global warming.
- Anne Rearick, photographer, Gloucester, Massachusetts; Instructor in Photography, Cambridge School of Weston, Massachusetts: Photography.
- Matthew Restall, Associate Professor of Latin American History, Anthropology, and Women's Studies, Pennsylvania State University: Slavery, society, and African-Mayan relations in colonial Yucatán.
- Jonathan Reynolds, Playwright & Screenwriter, New York City; Food Columnist, New York Times Magazine: Play writing.
- Reynold Reynolds, Film Maker, New York City: Film making.
- Gene E. Robinson, Professor of Entomology and Neuroscience and director, Neuroscience Program, University of Illinois at Urbana-Champaign: Genes and social behavior.
- Catherine Robson, Associate Professor of English, University of California, Davis: Victorian life and the memorized poem.
- Kathy Rose, Performance Artist, New York City; Senior Lecturer in Animation, University of the Arts, Philadelphia: Performance art.
- W. Jackson Rushing, III, Professor of Art History, University of Houston: Edgar Heap of Birds and contemporary visual arts.
- Subir Sachdev, Professor of Physics and Applied Physics, Yale University: Competing orders and criticality in quantum matter.
- Pauline Stella Sanchez, Installation Artist, Venice, California; Member of the Faculty, Art Center College of Design, Pasadena: Sculpture and installation art.
- Roger Sanjek, Professor of Anthropology, Queens College, City University of New York: A study of the Gray Panthers.
- Dolph Schluter, Professor of Zoology and Canada Research Chair, University of British Columbia: The genetic basis of ecological adaptation.
- Richard Evan Schwartz, Professor of Mathematics, University of Maryland, College Park: Connections between real and complex hyperbolic discrete groups.
- Gustavo E. Scuseria, Robert A. Welch Professor of Chemistry, Rice University: Studies in computational nanotechnology.
- Paul Shambroom, photographer, St. Paul, Minnesota: Photography.
- William F. Shannon, Choreographer, New York City: Choreography.
- Sophiline Cheam Shapiro, Choreographer, Long Beach, California; Artistic Director and Director of Programs, Khmer Arts Academy, Long Beach: Choreography.
- Alvin Singleton, composer, Atlanta, Georgia: Music composition.
- David K. Skelly, Associate Professor of Ecology, Yale University: Amphibian decline and biodiversity conservation.
- Jimmy Slyde, Choreographer and Dancer, Hanson, Massachusetts: Choreography.
- Lynn Staley, Harrington and Shirley Drake Professor of the Humanities in the Department of English, Colgate University: Chaucer, Richard II, and the languages of power in 14th-century England.
- Michael P. Steinberg, Professor of Modern European History, Cornell University: Modernity and secularity in German Jewish thought and art, 1780–1960.
- Leonel da Silveira Lobo Sternberg, Professor of Biology, University of Miami: Ant nests and the nutrition of tropical trees.
- Susan C. Stokes, Professor of Political Science, University of Chicago: Political clientelism in Argentina.
- Deborah Stratman, Film Maker, Chicago; Adjunct Assistant Professor of Film and Video, School of the Art Institute of Chicago; Adjunct Assistant Professor of Film, University of Illinois at Chicago: Film making.
- David Levi Strauss, Writer; High Falls, New York; Visiting Critic, Center for Curatorial Studies and The Graduate School of the Arts, Bard College: Photography and belief.
- Edward J. Sullivan, Professor of Fine Arts, New York University: The language of objects in Latin America.
- Timothy R. Tangherlini, Associate Professor of Folklore, The Scandinavian Section, University of California, Los Angeles: Folklore and rural society in 19th-century Denmark.
- Robert Taplin, artist, West Haven, Connecticut: Sculpture.
- Ray Thomas, New Media Artist, New York City and Paris, France: New media art.
- Henry Threadgill, composer, New York City: Music composition.
- Fei-Ran Tian, Associate Professor of Mathematics, Ohio State University: Nonlinear dispersive oscillations.
- Natasha Trethewey, poet, Decatur, Georgia; Assistant Professor of English, Emory University: Poetry.
- William Uricchio, Professor of Comparative Media Studies, Massachusetts Institute of Technology: The changing definition and deployment of television.
- Igor Vamos, Assistant Professor of Electronic Art, Rensselaer Polytechnic Institute: New media art.
- Diane Vaughan, Professor of Sociology, Boston College: Air-traffic control in the early 21st century.
- Paul Vester, Film Animator, Topanga, California; Visiting Professor of Experimental Animation, California Institute of the Arts: Digital film animation.
- Lynne Viola, Professor of Modern Russian History, University of Toronto: The birth of the gulag and forced labor in the Soviet Union, 1930–1953.
- Michael J. Watts, Class of '63 Professor and director, Institute of International Studies, University of California, Berkeley: Petroleum and economies of violence in Nigeria.
- Sam Wells, Film Maker, Princeton, New Jersey: Film making.
- Joel Werring, artist, Brooklyn, New York: Painting.
- Barbara White, composer, Princeton, New Jersey; Assistant Professor of Music, Princeton University: Music composition.
- Wendel A. White, Photographer, Galloway, New Jersey; Professor of Art, Richard Stockton College of New Jersey: Photography.
- Sabine Wilke, Professor of German, University of Washington, Seattle: Masochism and the German colonial imagination.
- William Earle Williams, photographer, Haverford, Pennsylvania; Professor of Fine Arts and Curator of Photographs, Haverford College: Photography.
- David Wojahn, poet, Richmond, Virginia; Professor of English, Virginia Commonwealth University; Member of the MFA Faculty in Writing Program, Vermont College: Poetry.
- Thomas A. Woolsey, Professor of Experimental Neurosurgery and George H. and Ethel R. Bishop Scholar in Neurological Surgery, of Experimental Neurology and George H. and Ethel R. Bishop Scholar in Neurology, of Biomedical Engineering, of Anatomy and Neurobiology, and of Physiology, Washington University School of Medicine: Knowledge of the nervous system derived from the whisker-barrel system.
- Robert Wuthnow, Gerhard R. Andlinger '52 Professor of Sociology, Princeton University: America's historic self-identity and the challenges of religious and cultural pluralism.
- Jack Xin, Professor of Mathematics, University of Texas at Austin: Partial differential equations for processing audio signals.
- Kevin Young, poet, Bloomington, Indiana; Ruth Lilly Professor of Poetry, Indiana University Bloomington: Poetry.
- Eviatar Zerubavel, Professor of Sociology, Rutgers University: The sociology of denial.
- Jianying Zha, writer, Fort Lauderdale, Florida; Research Scholar, Baker Institute, Rice University: The recent transformation of China.

== Latin American and Caribbean Fellows ==
- Jorge Mario Aceituno Moreno, photographer, Santiago, Chile; Professor of Photography, Institute of Arts and Sciences (ARCOS) and University of Chile: Photography.
- Rafael Barajas Durán, Writer and Cartoonist, La Jornada, Mexico City: Mexican political caricature of combat, 1872–1910.
- Fernando Juan Birri, Film Maker, Santa Fe, Argentina; Director, Fernando Birri Foundation for Multi-Media Arts: Screenwriting.
- Rodrigo B. Capaz, Adjunct Professor of Physics, Federal University of Rio de Janeiro: First-principles theory of nanosystems.
- Merle Collins, Professor of Comparative Literature and English, University of Maryland at College Park: Slavery and emancipation in Grenada and Carriacou.
- Ana Belén Elgoyhen, Adjunct Researcher, National Research Council of Argentina (CONICET): Nicotinic receptors of cochlear hair cells.
- Rodolfo Enrique Fogwill, writer, Buenos Aires, Argentina: Fiction.
- Célia Regina DaSilva García, Professor of Physiology, University of São Paulo, Brazil: Molecular mechanisms for melatonin modulation of the cell cycle of the malaria parasite.
- Germán Leopoldo García, Director of Education, Descartes Foundation, Buenos Aires, Argentina: The presence of psychiatry in Argentine cultural debates.
- Antonio García de León, Research Professor, National Institute of Anthropology and History (INAH), Morelos, Mexico: Colonial Veracruz and its Sotavento Coast, 1519–1821.
- Daniel García Helder, poet, Buenos Aires, Argentina; Coordinator, House of Poetry of Buenos Aires: Poetry.
- Maya Goded Colichio, photographer, Mexico City: Photography.
- Adrián Gorelik, Professor of Urban Cultural History, National University of Quilmes, Buenos Aires: The cycle of invention and critique of the "Latin American City".
- Silvina Gvirtz, director, School of Education, University of San Andrés, Buenos Aires; Associate Research Professor, National Research Council of Argentina (CONICET): A comparison of models of school governance in Argentina, Brazil, and Nicaragua.
- Carlos Huneeus, Adjunct Professor of Political Science, Pontifical Catholic University of Chile: Patricio Aylwin and the reestablishment of democracy in Chile.
- Ana Lía Kornblit, Principal Researcher, National Research Council of Argentina (CONICET); Professor of Social Psychology, University of Buenos Aires: Attitudes, beliefs, and risky sexual behaviors of Buenos Aires youths.
- Jorge Mario Liderman, composer, Richmond, California; Professor of Music, University of California, Berkeley: Music composition.
- Paulo Cesar de Souza Lins, writer, Rio de Janeiro, Brazil: Fiction.
- Gerardo Litvak, Choreographer, Buenos Aires, Argentina; Contemporary Dance Instructor, Ricardo Rojas Cultural Center, University of Buenos Aires: Choreography.
- Luis Marone, Scientific Researcher, National Research Council of Argentina, (CONICET); Free Professor, National University of Cuyo: Ecology and epistemology.
- Ursula M. Molter, Associate Professor of Mathematics, University of Buenos Aires; Independent Researcher, National Research Council of Argentina (CONICET): Harmonic analysis and applications.
- Julio F. Navarro, Professor of Physics and Astronomy, University of Victoria, Canada: The small scale structure of cold dark matter.
- María Novaro, Film Maker, Mexico City; Instructor in Film, Center for Cinematography Training, National Center for the Arts, Mexico City: Film making.
- Horacio Armando Paglione, Research Professor, University of Buenos Aires; Director, Center for Documentation and Research of the Leftist Culture in Argentina (CiDInCI): Biographical dictionary of the Argentine left.
- Alexandre A. Peixoto, Associate Researcher, Oswaldo Cruz Foundation, Rio de Janeiro: Molecular analysis of clock genes in disease vectors.
- Héctor Pérez-Brignoli, Professor of History, University of Costa Rica: Social conflicts and collective violence in Central America, 1920–1944.
- Marcelo Pichon Riviére, writer, Buenos Aires, Argentina: Fiction.
- Adriana Piscitelli, Senior Researcher and Associate Coordinator and professor, Center for Gender Studies, State University of Campinas, Brazil: Brazilian women and former sex tourists in Europe.
- Gustavo Gabriel Politis, Principal Researcher, National Research Council of Argentina (CONICET); Professor of Archaeology, National University of La Plata and National University of the Center of the Province of Buenos Aires: Archaeological research on hunter-gatherer societies of South America.
- José Osvaldo Previato, Professor of Biophysics, Federal University of Rio de Janeiro: Glycobiology and infectious microorganisms.
- Rafael Radi, Professor of Biochemistry, University of the Republic: Intercellular diffusion and toxicity of peroxynitrite.
- Mirta Noemí Rosenberg, Poet and translator, Buenos Aires, Argentina: Poetry.
- Esteban Roulet, Independent Researcher, National Research Council of Argentina (CONICET): The origin and nature of the highest energy cosmic rays.
- Luis Enrique Sam Colop, Writer and lawyer, Guatemala City: A Spanish translation of Popol Wuj.
- Lygia Sigaud, Professor of Social Anthropology, National Museum, Federal University of Rio de Janeiro: The social origins of inequality in agrarian reform settlements of Northeastern Brazil.
- Alberto Ure, Professor of Acting, Buenos Aires: Essays on Argentine theater.
- Jorge Andrés Zgrablich, Professor of Physics, National University of San Luis; Douglas H. Everett Professor of Chemistry, Metropolitan Autonomous University, Iztapalapa: Molecular processes at solid surfaces.

== See also ==
- Guggenheim Fellowship
