= Gippy Grewal discography =

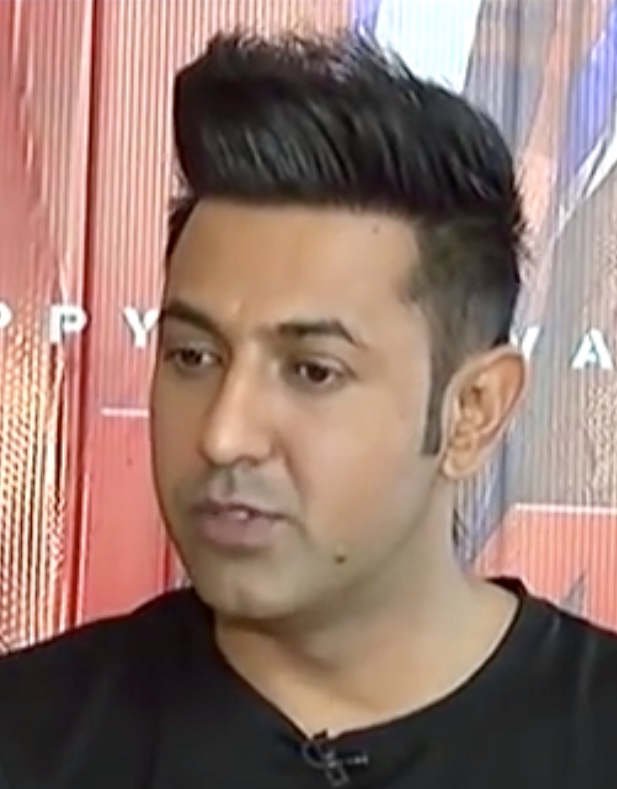
- Studio albums: 12
- Singles: 42
- Punjabi Films Songs: 95
- Hindi Films Songs: 8

The discography of Gippy Grewal consists of 12 studio albums, 42 singles and 108 soundtracks.

== Studio albums ==
Album	Album details	Music
Chakk Ley	Released: 2002; Label: Anand Music; Format: CD, Digital download, streaming	Atul Sharma
Aaja Wey Mitra	Released: 2003; Label: Nupur Audio; Format: CD, Digital download, streaming	Atul Sharma
Mele Mittaran De	Released: 2004; Label: Finetone (India); Planet Recordz (Canada): Format: CD, Digital download, streaming	Kiss'n'tell
Phulkari 2	Released: 2005; Label: Planet Recordz (Canada); Speed Records (India): Format: CD, Digital download, streaming	Kiss'n'tell
Akh Larh Gayi (Canada & India) The Album (UK)	Released: 2006; Label: Planet Recordz (Canada); Kamlee Records (UK) Speed Records (India): Format: CD, Digital download, Streaming	Sukhpal Sukh & J-Skillz
Chandi De Challe (Canada & India) Im Here (UK)	Released: 2007; Label: Planet Recordz/Speed Records |Planet Recordz (Canada); Kamlee Records (UK) Speed Records (India): Format: CD, Digital download, streaming	Bhinda Aujla
My Time To Shine	Released: 2008; Label: Planet Recordz/ Sukhnoor Aulakh (record label)|Planet Recordz (Canada); Kamlee Records (UK) Speed Records (India): Format: CD, Digital download, streaming	Bhinda Aujla
Desi Rockstar	Released: 2010; Label: Kamlee Records LTD/Speed Records (record label)|Music Waves Productions (Canada); Kamlee Records (UK) Speed Records (India): Format: CD, Digital download, streaming	Aman Hayer
Talwar	Released: 2011; Label: Speed Records (record label)|Speed Records; Format: CD, Digital download, streaming	Anu-Manu, Jatinder Shah
Desi Rockstar 2	Released: 2016; Label: Speed Records	JSL, Jatinder Shah, DJ Flow, Aman Hayer, Dr. Zeus
The Main Man	Released: 2020; Label: Geet Mp3; Format: Digital download, Streaming	Various
Limited Edition	Released: 2021; Label: Humble Music; Format: Digital download, streaming	Various

== Singles ==
=== As lead artist ===
Title	Year	Music	Peak chart position	Lyrics	Album
Title	Year	Music	UK Asian	Lyrics	Album
Gabru	2007	Bhinda Aujla			
Nasha	2007	Bhinda Aujla	—	Gurmeet Cheema	Chandi De Challe
Balle Balle	2008	Bhinda Aujla		Gurmeet Cheema	My Time to Shine
Halaat	2008	Bhinda Aujla		Raj Kakra	My Time to Shine
Yaar Mera	2008	Bhinda Aujla		Gurmeet Cheema	My Time to Shine
Tareya	2008	Joti Dhillon	—		
Raj Karda	2009	Prince Ghuman			
Kini Sohni	2009	Bhinda Aujla			
Hathyaar (featuring Roach Killa)	2010	Aman Hayer		Satti Samra	Desi Rockstar
Daang	2010	Aman Hayer		Veet Baljit	Desi Rockstar
Flower	2010	Aman Hayer	26	Inda Raikoti	Desi Rockstar
Mulajedariyan	2012	Honey Singh		Raj Kakra	
Hello Hello	2013	Dr Zeus	27	Veet Baljit	
Pariwar	2014	Jatinder Shah		Inda Raikoti	Talwar
Photo	2014	DJ Flow		Jassi Lokha	
Shut up	2014	Pav Dharia		Ravi Raj	
Ghat Boldi	2016	B Praak		Jaani	
Hikk Vich Jaan (featuring Badahah & JSL)	2016	JSL		Happy Raikoti	Desi Rockstar 2
Patt Lainge (featuring Neha Kakkar)	2016	Dr Zeus	2	Kamal Kharoud	Desi Rockstar 2
Lahore	2017	Dr Zeus		Navi Kamboz	
Car Nachdi (featuring Bohemia	2017	B Praak		Jaani	
Velna	2017	Jay K		Happy Raikoti	
Nai Shad Da	2017	Jay K		Jaani	
Sooraj	2018	B Praak		Jaani	
Hukam Da Yakka	2018	Desi Crew		Narinder Baath	
Weekend	2018	Laddi Gill	—	Sabbi Kothepona	
Khatarnaak (featuring Bohemia)	2019	Desi Crew		Kumar Sunny	
Where Baby Where	2020	Sukhe		Jaani	
Nach Nach	2020	Enzo		Kulshan Sandhu	
Miss You	2020	Enzo		Happy Raikoti	
Vigad Gaya	2020	Snappy		Rav Hanjra	
Me & U	2020	Desi Crew	—	Happy Raikoti	
Ayien Kiven (featuring Amrit Maan)	2020	Ikky		Amrit Maan	The Main Man
Ask Em (featuring Karan Aujla)	2020	Yeah Proof		Karan Aujla	The Main Man
2 Seater (featuringAfsana Khan)	2020	Ikky		Amrit Maan	The Main Man
Vailpuna (featuring Afsana Khan)	2020	Enzo		Kulshan Sandhu	The Main Man
Jado Nachdi Ae Tu	2021		—	Ulluminati	
2009 Reheated	2021	Bhinda Aujla		Jagdev Maan	Limited Edition
Hathyaar 2	2021	Laddi Gill		Happy Raikoti	Limited Edition
Sirra Hoyea Peya	2021	Deep Jandu		Mani Longia	Limited Edition
Jatt Bukda Fire (featuring Sultaan)	2021	Bhinda Aujla		Mani Longia	Limited Edition
Bandook	2021	Red Room Studio		Ricky Khan	Limited Edition
Fark	2021	Desi Crew	—	Sunny Randhawa	Limited Edition
Darji (featuring Gurlez Akhtar)	2022	Red Room Studio		Ricky Khan	Limited Edition
By Name	2022	Wazir Patar		Guri Guri Gill	Limited Edition
Munda Grewala Da	2022	Taran Singh	—	Guri Mattu	Limited Edition

=== As featured artist ===
Title	Year	Music	Lyrics	Label	Album
Angreji Beat (Yo Yo Honey Singh feat. Gippy Grewal)	2011	Yo Yo Honey Singh	Veet Baljit	Speed Records	International Villager

== Film soundtrack ==
=== Punjabi ===
Movie	Year	Song	Notes
Mel Karade Rabba	2010	Sher Ban Ke	
Dharti	2011	Sarkaraan	
Mirza – The Untold Story	2011		
Jihne Mera Dil Luteya (with Diljit Dosanjh & Bhinda Aujla)	2011	"Billi Billi Akh", "Munde Jattan De", "Channa" and "Jhanjar"	
Carry on Jatta	2012	"Carry on Jatta", "Phulkari", "Roula Pai Gaya", "Marjawa", "Udaayi Ja", "Tera Na", "Funda"	
Singh vs Kaur	2013	"Zakhmi Dil", "Cut Sleev", "Bukhchu", "Maasi", "Singha Singha", "Donali"	
Lucky di Unlucky Story	2013	"Whisky", "Kach Da Samaan", "Desi Gana", "Sap Keel Ley", "Dil Tut Na Jave", "Ishq Da Rog"	
Best of Luck (with Jazzy B)	2013	"Khangya", "Happy Shappy", "91 ya 92", "Papa Nu Pta Lag Ju "	
Bhaji in Problem	2013	"Love ho Gaya", "Ghar di Sharab", "Ishq Zehreela", "Chad Gayi Oye", "Ferrari"	
Jatt James Bond	2014	"Chandi Di Dabbi", "Jatt Diyan Tauran", "Tu Meri Baby Doll"	
Double di Trouble	2014	"26 Ban Gayi", "Dil Nachda Phire", "Football", "Lak Tunu Tunu"	
Faraar	2015	"Budwaar", "Jatti", "Diamond", "Taur"	
Kaptaan	2016	"Oscar", "26-26", "Redua", "Rabba Rabba"	
Ardaas	2016	Mere Sahib	Guest Appearance
Lock	2016	Jatt On Top	
Manje Bistre	2017	"Jatt Attitude" and "Dubai Wale Shaikh"	
Jora 10 Numbariya	2017	"Jora 10 Numbariya"	
Subedar Joginder Singh	2018	"GAL DIL DI", "ISHQ DA TARA"	
Laavan Phere	2018	25 Kille Ft. Mannat Toor	
Vadhayiyaan Ji Vadhayiyaan	2018	Akh Ladgayi	
Carry on Jatta 2	2018	"Carry on Jatta 2", "Kurta Chadra", "Gabru", "DJ Wala", "Kikli", "Bhangra Pa Lyiye"	
Mar Gaye Oye Loko	2018	"Fuel", "Lagda Khair Nahi", "Mar Gaye Oye Loko"	
Manje Bistre 2	2019	"Current", "Bolliyan"	
Ardaas Karaan	2019	"Bachpan"	
Ik Sandhu Hunda Si	2019	"Ik Sandhu Hunda Si", "Charche", "Sone Di Wang"	
Naukar Vahuti Da	2019	"Naukar Vahuti Da"	
Daaka	2019	"Gal Theek Ni Lagdi", "Phulkari"	
Chandigarh Amritsar Chandigarh	2019	"Ambersar De Papad", "Aaja Billo Katthe Nachiye", "Beautiful Jatti"	
Posti	2020	"Posti (Title Track)"	
Paani Ch Madhaani	2021	"VCR", "Pind Pind", "Jean", "Jigre"	
Yaar Mera Titliaan Warga	2022	"Nawa Nawa Pyaar", "Billo"	

=== Hindi ===
Movie	Year	Song	
Cocktail	2012	Angreji Beat (ft. Yo Yo Honey Singh	
Dharam Sankat Mein	2015	Tu Takke; Do You Know Baby	Also as an actor
Second Hand Husband	2015	Bad Baby; Mithi Meri Jaan; Second Hand Husband	Also as an actor
Loveshhuda	2016	Chitta Kukkad (ft.Neha Kakkar)	
Befikre	2016	Khulke Dulke (ft.Harshdeep Kaur)	
Jugjugg Jeeyo	2022	The Punjaabban Song (ft. Tanishk Bagchi, Zara S Khan, Romy)	
