= Laura Albert (academic) =

Professor of Industrial and Systems Engineering

- Education: University of Illinois at Urbana-Champaign
- Awards: Fulbright Award (2020) IISE Fellow (2020); AAAS Fellow (2020) NSF Career Award (2011)
- Scientific career
- Fields: Operations research Industrial engineering Discrete optimization Sports Analytics
- Workplaces: University of Wisconsin-Madison; Virginia Commonwealth University
- Doctoral advisor: Sheldon H. Jacobson
- Website: directory.engr.wisc.edu/ie/Faculty/Albert_Laura/

Laura Albert (formerly Laura McLay) is a professor of Industrial and Systems Engineering at the University of Wisconsin-Madison in the College of Engineering. Albert is an expert in Operations Research, specializing solving and modeling discrete optimization problems arising from applications in homeland security, disaster management, emergency response, public services, and healthcare.

== Early years ==
Albert is the daughter of James and Julie Albert, and she graduated from James B. Conant High School in 1996.

== Education ==
Albert completed her bachelor in General Engineering at the University of Illinois at Urbana-Champaign in 2000 with an International Minor in German. She continued to study for her master's degree in General Engineering and Computational Science at the same institution in 2001. In 2006, Albert completed her PhD in Industrial Engineering at the University of Illinois at Urbana-Champaign on the topic "Designing aviation security systems: Theory and practice".

== Research ==
Albert's research interests are in the field of Operations Research. She has published more than 55 articles on topics including public safety, emergency response, homeland security, aviation security, emergency medical services, infrastructure protection, and cyber-security. This research is primarily in the area of discrete optimization.

== Awards ==
- George W. Harper Award for outstanding work in safety engineering, 2005, Department of Mechanical and Industrial Engineering, University of Illinois, Urbana, IL.
- Operations Research Challenge Competition Winner, First Symposium on Operations Research and the Criminal Justice System, US National Institute of Justice 2006.
- INFORMS Computing Society Student Paper Competition, Runner-up, 2006.
- Fellow, National Science Foundation, Enabling the Next Generation of Hazards and Disasters Researchers Fellows Program, 2009.
- Outstanding IIE Publication Award (with Sheldon H. Jacobson), 2009.
- Best paper award, 2009 Industrial Engineering Research Conference, Operations Research track (with Sunarin Chanta, Maria Mayorga, and Margaret Wiecek), 2009.
- Young Investigator Award, Department of the Army-Materiel Command, Army Research Office, 2010.
- NSF CAREER Award, 2011.
- Achievement Award Winner for Next-Generation Emergency Medical Response Through Data Analysis & Planning (Best in Category winner, as part of the Hanover County Fire & EMS team), National Association of Counties, 2010.
- Excellence in Scholarship Award, College of Humanities and Sciences, Virginia Commonwealth University, 2012.
- Best paper award from Risk Analysis, Society of Risk Analysis (with Casey Rothschild and Seth Guikema), 2012.
- Best Paper Award from IIE Transactions Focused Issue on Scheduling and Logistics (with Maria Mayorga), 2014.
- INFORMS Moving Spirit Award for service to INFORMS fora, 2014.
- Faculty recognition award, Leaders in Engineering Excellence and Diversity, University of Wisconsin-Madison College of Engineering, 2015, 2017, 2018.
- Harvey Spangler Award for Technology Enhanced Instruction, University of Wisconsin-Madison College of Engineering, 2017.
- Fellow, the Big Ten Academic Alliance-Academic Leadership Program (BTAA-ALP), 2018–19.
- Harvey D. Spangler Faculty Scholar, College of Engineering, University of Wisconsin-Madison, 2018 – 2021.
- INFORMS Impact Prize for research contributions to risk-based security in aviation security and its influence on TSA PreCheck with Sheldon H. Jacobson, Kenneth Fletcher, Adrian Lee, and Alexander Nikolaev, 2018.
- Ragnar E. Onstad Service to Society Award, College of Engineering, University of Wisconsin-Madison, 2019.
- Advancement of Women in Operations Research/Management Science Award, INFORMS 2019.
- Fulbright Award, 2020.
- Institute of Industrial and Systems Engineers (IISE) Fellow Award recipient, 2020.
- American Association for the Advancement of Science (AAAS) Fellow, 2020

== Academic activities ==
Albert is very active within the operations research and management science community. In 2021 she was elected to the role of President-Elect of INFORMS; she will lead the organization starting in 2023. She had served as INFORMS Vice President for Marketing, Communication and Outreach from 2016 to 2019. She has also served as the President of Women in OR/MS (WORMS, a forum of INFORMS), the President of the INFORMS Section on Public Sector Operations Research, and a member of the INFORMS Strategic Planning Committee, Finance Committee, and IT committee.

== Outreach activities ==
Albert is the author of Punk Rock Operations Research, a popular blog about operations research and analytics. Albert is also the director of Badger Bracketology and its blog that reports on the methodology for forecasting the NCAA football playoff based on the research from the University of Wisconsin-Madison College of Engineering sports analytics team. Albert routinely promotes operations research, industrial engineering, and analytics through her blogs, public talks and media interviews. She regularly appears on local and national media, including PBS Wisconsin, WORT Radio, Wisconsin Public Radio, CBS58 in Milwaukee, WISC-TV in Madison, the MIT Management Review, and Wharton Moneyball, among many others. Profiles of Albert have appeared in American Society for Engineering Education PRISM, the Wisconsin State Journal, the Cap Times, and SB Nation Bucky's 5th Quarter.
