= Lamborghini (disambiguation) =

Lamborghini is an Italian manufacturer of high performance sports cars, now a subsidiary of Audi AG.

Lamborghini may also refer to:

== People ==
- Ferruccio Lamborghini (1916–1993), founder of the auto and tractor manufacturing companies
- Ferruccio Lamborghini II (motorcyclist) (born 1991), Italian motorcycle racer
- Elettra Lamborghini (born 1994), Italian TV personality
- Leónidas Lamborghini (1927–2009), Argentine writer and poet
- Osvaldo Lamborghini (1940–1985), Argentine writer

== Other uses ==
- Lamborghini Trattori, former Italian manufacturer of tractors, now a brand of Same Deutz-Fahr
- Automobili Lamborghini (video game), a video game released in 1997
- Lamborghini: The Man Behind the Legend, a 2022 American film
- Lamborghini (video game), a cancelled racing video game by Rage Software
- "Lamborghini" (song), a 2015 song by KSI featuring P Money
- "Lamberghini" (song), a 2018 song by the Indian musicians The Doorbeen featuring Ragini Tandan
