= Alan Pritsker =

American engineer (1933–2000)

A. Alan B. Pritsker
- Alan Pritsker
- Born: February 5, 1933; Philadelphia
- Died: August 24, 2000 (aged 67)
- Education: Ohio State University
- Scientific career
- Fields: Operations research
- Workplaces: Purdue University
- Thesis: The Optimal Control of Discrete Stochastic Processes (1961)

A. Alan B. Pritsker (February 5, 1933—August 24, 2000) was an American engineer, pioneer in the field of Operations research, and one of the founders of the field of computer simulation. Over the course of a fifty-five-year career, he made numerous contributions to the field of simulation and to the larger fields of industrial engineering and operations research.

== Biography ==
Alan Pritsker was born in Philadelphia to Robert and Gertrude Pritsker. He served on the faculties of Arizona State University (1962–69), Virginia Polytechnic Institute and State University (1969–70) and Purdue University (1970–98). In addition to educating many undergraduate-level students in hundreds of traditional academic courses and industrial short courses on simulation, Alan Pritsker compiled a superlative record as an adviser of graduate students. Of the eighteen doctoral students and over sixty master's students who completed their graduate work under his supervision, all are highly successful professionals in academia, government or industry.

From 1970 to 1973 he was also the director of Purdue's Center for Large-Scale Systems. During the 1970s and 80s, his activities at Purdue led to what many observers have called the "Golden Age of Simulation". He was a co-founder of Pritsker & Associates, Inc. (1973). He also served as the Board Chair of FACTROL, Inc. (1986–89). When Pritsker Corporation was created in 1989 through the merger of Pritsker & Associates and FACTROL, he served the new company as Board Chair and CEO (1989–91 and 1996–98) and as President and CEO (1991–96).

He cofounded the Operations Research Division of AIIE in 1968 and he served as the director of that division from 1968 to 1970. He also co-originated the AIIE Systems Engineering Conference in 1973. Alan Pritsker's service to professional societies was not limited to IIE. From 1973 to 1979, he served the Society for Computer Simulation as the SIMULATION journal's area editor for combined discrete-continuous simulation. Elected to the National Academy of Engineering in 1985, Alan Pritsker enjoyed the distinction of being the second industrial engineer to join that organization. For over fifteen years, he actively served the National Academy of Engineering in many positions of great responsibility. By his leadership in these various professional societies and governmental organizations over the past forty-five years, Alan Pritsker contributed significantly to the dramatic growth of the field of simulation as well as the larger fields of industrial engineering and operations research.

In 1966 Alan Pritsker received the "AIIE Distinguished Research Award" and he was elected a Fellow of AIIE in 1978. In 1987 he received the "Arthur Young–VENTURE Magazine Entrepreneur of the Year Award". He also received honorary doctorates from Arizona State University (1992) and Purdue University (1998). In 1991 he received from IIE the "Frank and Lillian Gilbreth Industrial Engineering Award", the highest honor presented by that organization. For his long-standing, exceptional service to the international simulation community, he received the “Distinguished Service Award” from the INFORMS–College on Simulation in 1991. Moreover, in 1999 he received the “Lifetime Professional Achievement Award” from the INFORMS–College on Simulation, which is the highest honor given by that society.

The Pritsker Award is given each year at Arizona State University for outstanding accomplishment in teaching. The Institute of Industrial Engineers Pritsker Doctoral Dissertation Award recognizes outstanding graduate research in the field of industrial engineering

== Work ==
Comprehensive documentation of his career can be found in his professional autobiography Papers, Experiences, Perspectives (Systems Publishing Corporation 1990). In March 2001 an article entitled "Alan Pritsker’s Multifaceted Career: Theory, Practice, Education, Entrepreneurship, and Service" appeared in a special issue of IIE Transactions honoring Alan Pritsker for his numerous contributions to the profession over five decades.

=== Discrete-continuous system simulation ===
Foremost among Alan Pritsker's achievements is his work in the theory and methodology of discrete and combined discrete-continuous system simulation. During the early 1970s, he and his students formulated the basic principles of combined discrete-continuous simulation and implemented those principles in the GASP IV, SAINT, and SMOOTH simulation languages. Subsequently, he extended the foundations of combined simulation to encompass the process-interaction approach; and working with several collaborators, he implemented a family of simulation software systems, including SLAM and its extensions—SLAM II, TESS, SLAMSYSTEM, FACTOR/AIM, and Visual SLAM/AweSim. His strategic vision of a family of related simulation software products played a crucial role in the growth and maturing of the field of simulation over the past thirty years.

=== Stochastic network ===
Alan Pritsker also made numerous fundamental contributions to the theory and methodology for analysis of stochastic networks and more general large-scale simulation experiments. For this work he received the “H. B. Maynard Innovative Achievement in Industrial Engineering Award” from the American Institute of Industrial Engineers (AIIE, now IIE) in 1978 and the “Outstanding Simulation Publication Award” from The Institute of Management Sciences (TIMS, now INFORMS) College on Simulation and Gaming (now the College on Simulation) in 1985.

=== Engineering theory and practice ===
Among Alan Pritsker's diverse contributions to engineering practice, perhaps the most prominent was his development and use of large-scale simulation models to support policy analysis for organ transplantation by the United Network for Organ Sharing. In particular, his work was used to formulate more effective and equitable protocols for assigning liver transplants to waiting patients. This is a remarkable example of the definitive practice of system simulation in addressing ultimate questions of life and death.

Most of Alan Pritsker's contributions to engineering theory, methodology and practice are available through numerous texts and book chapters published over a forty-five year period. He disseminated knowledge about simulation technology at all levels of academia, government and industry through the publication of twelve popular textbooks.

=== Simulation ===
Another prominent aspect of Alan Pritsker's contributions to the growth of the field of simulation was his role in founding and leading several commercial enterprises dedicated to the development and dissemination of simulation technology.

Alan Pritsker's service to the profession spanned a broad range of activities sustained over four decades. Perhaps his most prominent contributions in service were made through his leadership of the Winter Simulation Conference (WSC). He served as a member of the WSC Board of Directors representing AIIE from 1970 to 1973. He also served on the WSC Board of Directors representing TIMS–College on Simulation and Gaming from 1981 to 1987; and he served as Board Chair from 1984 to 1985. He was an active participant in the technical program of the WSC each year for over thirty years, and in 1989 he delivered the keynote address for that conference.

== Quotes ==
Lee Schruben of the University of California, Berkeley describing Alan Pritsker's influence on the industry:

"Alan is directly responsible for the success of many careers in simulation, mine included. Indeed, he was the first, and maybe the last, to demonstrate that it is possible to be a first-rate practicing engineer, scholarly researcher, devoted teacher, and successful entrepreneur. Many people in the field have modeled their careers after one of these characteristics of Alan — none, to date, have succeeded in doing all four. Almost everyone in our field has been influenced at least indirectly by Alan's activities."

John White, Chancellor Emeritus of the University of Arkansas, summarizing Alan Pritsker's contributions to the field of simulation with the following memorable comparison:

"I believe Alan Pritsker's accomplishments surpass those of, arguably, the world's greatest hockey player, Wayne Gretzky. It is said that good hockey players skate to where the puck is, but Gretzky skates to where the puck is going to be. Alan Pritsker did not just skate to where simulation was going to be; instead he took it to where it needed to be. He has shaped and defined the field."

== Publications ==
- 1961. Optimal control of discrete stochastic processes.
- 1964. Analysis of conveyor systems.
- 1966. GERT: graphical evaluation and review technique.
- 1969. Simulation with GASP-II; a FORTRAN based simulation language. With Philip J. Kiviat.
- 1970. JASP: A simulation language for a time-shared system.
- 1974. GASP IV simulation language.
- 1975. Simulation with GASP PL/I : a PL/I based continuous/discrete simulation language. With Robert E. Young.
- 1977. Modeling and analysis using Q-GERT networks.
- 1979. Modeling and analysis using Q-GERT networks.
- 1979. Introduction to simulation and SLAM. With Claude Dennis Pegden.
- 1983. Management decision making : a network simulation approach. With C. Elliott Sigal.
- 1986. Introduction to simulation and SLAM II.
- 1986. Solutions : introduction to Simulation and SLAM II
- 1987. TESS : the extended simulation support system. With Charles R. Standridge.
- 1987. Introduction to simulation and SLAM II.
- 1989. Slam II network models for decision support. With C. Elliott Sigal and R.D. Jack Hammesfahr.
- 1990. Papers, experiences, perspectives.
- 1995. Introduction to simulation and SLAM II.
- 1997. Simulation with Visual SLAM and AweSim. With Jean J. O'Reilly and David K. LaVal.
- 1999. Simulation with Visual SLAM and AweSim. Jean J. O'Reilly.
