= Samuel Welles =

Samuel Welles may refer to:

- Samuel Gardner Welles (1913–1981), American journalist
- Samuel Paul Welles (1907–1997), American palaeontologist

== See also ==
- Samuel Wells (1801–1868), American politician
- Sam Wells (disambiguation)
