= Michael Steinberg =

Michael Steinberg may refer to:

- Michael Steinberg (music critic) (1928–2009), American music critic and musicologist
- Michael Steinberg (film-maker) (born 1959), American film director and producer
- Michael Steinberg (lawyer) (born 1959), lawyer and political candidate in Florida who ran against J. W. Grant
- Michael P. Steinberg, professor of history, and of music and German studies
