= Kashmiri wedding songs =

Kashmir is shared between India and Pakistan. Kashmiri wedding songs can therefore mean

- Weddings in India
- Hindi and Urdu wedding songs
- Pakistani wedding songs
