= Justin Kimball =

Justin Kimball may refer to:

- Justin Ford Kimball, American businessman, educator, and inventor
- Justin Kimball (photographer), American photographer, educator, and artist
