= Lachowicz =

Lachowicz is a Polish surname. Notable people include:

- Dionisio Lachovicz (born 1946), Brazilian Ukrainian Greek-Catholic hierarch
- Al Lachowicz (born 1960), an American former Major League Baseball pitcher
- Colleen Lachowicz (1964), an American politician and social worker from Maine
- Jacek Lachowicz (born 1972), a Polish musician, author and producer
- Rachel Lachowicz (born 1964), an American artist based in Los Angeles, California
- Robert Lachowicz (born 1990), an English professional ice hockey left winger
