= GASP (simulation language) =

GASP, GASP II and GASP IV are FORTRAN-based simulation languages. GASP stands for General Activity Simulation Program.

SLAM (Simulation Language for Analogue Modelling) is a simulation language based on Fortran and GASP.

== GASP ==
Work on the original GASP project was done by Philip J. Kiviat at U.S. Steel Corporation, and was geared to use on small to medium size computers with FORTRAN II compilers.

Like SIMSCRIPT (conceived in 1962), there are developmental links of GASP (1964) at RAND Corporation.

While one of the RAND principals conceded that "GASP cannot compete with SIMSCRIPT" the same person praised GASP's strength: that it "serves well those who have only a small machine or who use several computers with no common language."

== GASP II ==
While GASP II is an extension of GASP which even supports PERT simulations, a version named Basic GASP II was introduced to facilitate reduced per-user computer resources in a teaching environment.

Pritsker and Kiviat "decided not to rewrite GASP in FORTRAN IV" to retain support for both small and newer/larger

== GASP IV ==
'GASP IV was a further extension.
