= Sam Wells =

Sam Wells may refer to:

- Sam Wells (cricketer) (born 1984), New Zealand cricketer
- Sam Wells (filmmaker) (1950–2011), American experimental filmmaker and photographer
- Sam Wells (priest) (born 1965), English priest of the Church of England
- Samuel Garnet Wells (1885–1972), Australian artist, cartoonist, and caricaturist
