= Sheldon H. Jacobson =

American educator

- Education: McGill University, Cornell University
- Awards: INFORMS Fellow, IISE Fellow, AAAS Fellow, Guggenheim Fellow, IISE Award for Technical Innovation in Industrial Engineering, IISE David F. Baker Distinguished Research Award, INFORMS Impact Prize, INFORMS Gass Expository Writing Award, INFORMS Presidents Award, INFORMS Kimball Medal
- Scientific career
- Fields: Operations Research, Computer Science, Industrial Engineering
- Workplaces: University of Illinois at Urbana-Champaign, Virginia Tech, Case Western Reserve University
- Doctoral advisor: Lee W. Schruben

Sheldon H. Jacobson is an American educator, noted for contributions that apply operations research to problems related to aviation security, public health, political redistricting, and NCAA basketball. He holds the position of Founder Professor of Engineering in the Siebel School of Computing and Data Science at the University of Illinois at Urbana-Champaign.

== Biography ==
Jacobson received B.Sc. and M.Sc. degrees in mathematics from McGill University (in 1981 and 1983, respectively), and both a M.S. and a Ph.D. in operations research from Cornell University (in 1986 and 1988, respectively). Subsequently, he joined the faculty of the Weatherhead School of Management at Case Western Reserve University in 1988, and then the Department of Industrial & Systems Engineering at Virginia Tech in 1993. In 1999, he joined the Department of Mechanical & Industrial Engineering at the University of Illinois at Urbana-Champaign, moving to the Department of Computer Science in 2006. From 2012 to 2014, he served as the program director for operations research at the National Science Foundation. He has served on the National Research Council's Committee on Airport Passenger Screening: Backscatter X-Ray Machines (2013-2015) and the National Academy of Medicine's Standing Committee for the Centers for Disease Control and Prevention Division of Strategic National Stockpile (2015-2017) .

=== Aviation security research ===
Jacobson co-authored the first paper demonstrating how operations research models could be used to optimize the performance of aviation security systems. He co-led the first study analyzing the costs and benefits of 100% checked baggage screening. Jacobson also designed and analyzed a class of multi-level passenger prescreening models to optimize the performance of aviation passenger and baggage security operations using a risk-based paradigm. This research, funded by the National Science Foundation, provided the technical foundations for risk-based aviation security policies (including the Transportation Security Administration's PreCheck program) that are now used at commercial airports throughout the United States. This research was recognized with the 2018 INFORMS Impact Prize for its contributions to risk-based security in aviation security and its influence on TSA PreCheck. During the 2014 Ebola outbreak in the United States, Jacobson argued that risk-based security screening concepts could also be applied to the health threat. After the 2016 Atatürk Airport attack in Istanbul, Turkey, Jacobson contended that decreasing pressure on checkpoints inside airports is essential, advocating for more enrollment in expedited screening such as TSA PreCheck. In late 2016, he published a study showing that waiving the TSA PreCheck fee would result in a net savings of $34 million due to reduced screening costs.

=== Public health research ===
Jacobson was one of the first researchers to apply operations research models to public health problems. His contributions focused on the design and optimization of pediatric vaccine formularies, with implications on pediatric vaccine formulary design, pediatric vaccine pricing (particularly combination vaccines), and pediatric vaccine stockpiling to mitigate shortages. Jacobson's research on the relationship between obesity, fuel consumption, and transportation established the first association between a public health problem and how the built environment may have unexpected, deleterious societal consequences, in this case, costing over a billion extra gallons of gasoline each year.

=== Outreach and public engagement ===
Jacobson spearheaded the launch of three web sites which showcase data analytics applied to issues of broad interest. Election Analytics provides forecasts for the United States Presidential and Senate elections. Its model correctly predicted 49 out of 50 states in both the 2008 and 2012 elections. In 2016, while a Donald Trump victory was one of 21 scenarios forecast by the site, its "neutral" analysis gave Hillary Clinton a 99.2% chance to win on the morning of election day. BracketOdds provides an analytics perspective on March Madness, with appearances in national media coverage including the Chicago Tribune, NBCNews.com, Bleacher Report, and Men's Health. Driving Obesity provides a tool for individuals to compare their BMI to national averages based on their driving habits. Jacobson has written op-eds on issues related to airport security and screening that have appeared in The Washington Post, CNN Opinion, Quartz., and many other media outlets .

== Awards and honors ==
Jacobson is a Fellow of INFORMS, the IISE and American Association for the Advancement of Science. He received a Guggenheim Fellowship in 2003. He is a two-time winner of the IISE Award for Technical Innovation in Industrial Engineering, in 2010 and again in 2013. His research video, "Aviation Security: Researching the Risk," garnered WILL-TV an Award of Excellence for the "College or University" and "Video News Release" categories in the 2006 Communicator Awards. In 2013, Jacobson received the Media Relations Award for Communications & Marketing Excellence from the University of Illinois Office of Public Affairs for "showcasing how computer science and data analysis can be put to practical use in a way that the news media and general public understand." In 2017, he was awarded the IISE David F. Baker Distinguished Research Award for his lifetime research contributions in the field of Industrial Engineering. In 2018, Jacobson was part of a team that was awarded the INFORMS Impact Prize for their research contributions to risk-based security in aviation security and its influence on TSA PreCheck.
