= Listening to Reason: Culture, Subjectivity, and Nineteenth-Century Music =

2004 book by Michael P. Steinberg

- Cover
- Author: Michael P. Steinberg
- Language: English
- Subject: Musicology, cultural history, philosophy, and psychoanalytic theory
- Genre: Nonfiction, scholarly monograph
- Publisher: Princeton University Press
- Publication date: 2004
- Publication place: United States
- Pages: 246
- ISBN: 0-691-11685-7
- Dewey Decimal: 780'.9'034
- LC Class: ML196.S74 2004
- Followed by: The Afterlife of Moses: Exile, Democracy, Renewal (2022)

Listening to Reason: Culture, Subjectivity, and Nineteenth-Century Music is a 2004 book by American cultural historian Michael P. Steinberg. Steinberg studies the role of European classical music in shaping modern concepts of subjectivity from Mozart through the early twentieth century. He argues that nineteenth-century music functioned as both a language and mode of experience for articulating selfhood, operating as an active cultural force rather than merely reflecting existing social conditions. Steinberg analyzes works by Mozart, Beethoven, Mendelssohn, Schumann, Wagner, Brahms, Verdi, Dvořák, and others to demonstrate how music participated in broader cultural negotiations between individual autonomy and collective identity, particularly in relation to national consciousness and religious difference.

== Summary ==
Steinberg studies how European music from Mozart to the early twentieth century functioned as a crucial medium for articulating and organizing modern subjectivity—understood not as a fixed property of the self, but as a dynamic mode of first-person experience that negotiates boundaries between self and world.

The work comprises seven chapters that trace a historical and thematic arc through the long nineteenth century. Steinberg begins with the Mozart/Da Ponte operas, arguing that these works stage the emergence of modern subjectivity through their critique of baroque visual power and their embrace of an aural regime of engagement. Don Giovanni explores the scene of patricide, Le nozze di Figaro presents emancipation, and Così fan tutte offers a scene of instruction that connects Mozart's project to Rousseau's philosophical concerns.

The second chapter examines Beethoven's complex relationship to heroism and abstraction. Steinberg argues that Beethoven, despite his Catholic origins, pursued a Protestantizing aesthetic while maintaining aristocratic pretensions, creating fundamental tensions in his work. The analysis focuses particularly on Fidelio and the Ninth Symphony, exploring how Beethoven's music negotiates between representation and autonomy.

Chapter three investigates Biedermeier music through contrasting studies of Mendelssohn and Schumann. Steinberg characterizes Mendelssohn's approach as "canny history"—a fragile but successful negotiation of intercultural subjectivity informed by his Jewish-Protestant family background. Schumann's "uncanny histories", by contrast, reveal subjectivity entrapped in history, with his piano music serving as a site of the heimlich and unheimlich.

The fourth chapter, positioned at the book's center, addresses Wagner's transformation of music from a discourse of subjectivity to one of identity. Steinberg analyzes The Ring as both symptom and critique of nineteenth-century German historical crisis, examining how Wagner's music drama attempts to redeem heroic subjectivity while paradoxically becoming the kind of institution it critiques.

Chapter five traces how composers articulated collective identity at moments of national formation. Through analyses of Brahms's German Requiem, Verdi's Messa da Requiem, and Dvořák's works, Steinberg examines the tension between music as the voice of the people and its role in constructing national identity.

The sixth chapter, "Minor Modernisms", addresses the post-Wagnerian crisis through figures including Debussy, Bartók, and Janáček. These composers sought to reconstitute musical subjectivity in non-Wagnerian terms, navigating between tradition and innovation at the fin de siècle.

The final chapter poses the question of how music engages with psychoanalytic mappings of the unconscious in the twentieth century. Steinberg investigates whether Schoenberg's revolution, in rejecting the depiction of the unconscious in music, also shut down the possibility of musical subjectivity itself.

== Reviews ==
Peter Tregear praised Steinberg's ambitious project to defend nineteenth-century music's continuing relevance as both cultural experience and mode of analysis. While noting the book's dense prose occasionally became overwrought, Tregear found rich insights in the Mozart chapter's investigation of how the da Ponte operas "stage subjectivity" through the lens of Catholic-Protestant tensions. He admired Steinberg's ability to draw on pre-existing critical traditions when tracing Beethoven's shift from abstract to absolute music and Wagner's transformation of subjectivity into national identity.

Jolanta T. Pekacz considered the work an attempt to position music as "a key genre in the history of cultural and aesthetic form" and applauded the author's creative critical observations. However, Pekacz found the book's epistemological framework less compelling for cultural historians, who might question broad categorizations like "bourgeois mentality" or "Protestant tropes", though she allowed that musicologists interested in subjective criticism might find value in Steinberg's idiosyncratic reflections.

Peter Jameson Mercer-Taylor characterized the book as cultural history and critique that confirmed Steinberg's position as a leading figure in bridging musicology and cultural studies. Although he noted that actual musical discussion played a surprisingly slight role given the book's title, with Steinberg focusing more on texts than music itself, Mercer-Taylor lauded the work's contribution to ongoing efforts to collapse disciplinary boundaries. He found Steinberg's project worth "overhearing" despite feeling at times like an eavesdropper on a conversation from another disciplinary realm.

Jane F. Fulcher commended Steinberg for making a truly major contribution demonstrating how musical meaning and creativity in the Austro-German sphere intertwined with ideological and political tensions. Building on his mentor Carl Schorske's insights, Steinberg illustrated how composers confronted larger issues of the "long nineteenth century" as both artists and intellectuals. Fulcher praised his sophisticated understanding of musical values and contexts, and said that despite some caveats about his treatment of French opera, Steinberg had given valuable new understanding of these artists and their compositions.

In his review, David Gramit found Steinberg's theoretical framework to be one of the book's greatest achievements, especially his clear and concise definition of subjectivity as "the subject in motion" within the historical context of modernist desires for emancipation. Gramit admired Steinberg's ambitious scope in tracing music's role from Mozart to Mahler, with the Mendelssohn chapter standing out for its nuanced consideration of how the composer negotiated his Jewish and Protestant heritages alongside civic and monarchical loyalties. While Gramit questioned whether the exclusive focus on canonical masterworks could truly offer the "specific historical, cultural definition" Steinberg promised—noting the absence of lighter contemporary repertoires and concrete audience expectations—he recognized the work as an impressive contribution that demonstrated how aesthetic experience and cultural significance intertwine in the long nineteenth century.
