= Parichay (singer) =

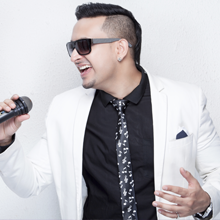

Background information
- Born: Mumbai, India
- Origin: Toronto, Ontario, Canada
- Genres: Bollywood Hip hop R&B Pop
- Occupations: Singer, composer, music producer
- Labels: N-tro Records
- Website: parichayonline.com

Parichay is an Indo-Canadian singer, composer, and music producer. He has released four albums and collaborated in Bollywood film songs.

== Career ==
Parichay collaborated in a remix of Yamla Pagla Deewana and "O Meri Chandni" from the film Chaar Din Ki Chandni which he sang with Sunidhi Chauhan. In 2016, he composed 4 out of 5 songs for the Bollywood film Loveshhuda.. He also sang 3 of them along with Vishal Dadlani, Neha Kakkar and Teesha Nigam. In June 2017, he released a new single titled 'Habitaan Vigaad Di' which features Bollywood actress Nargis Fakhri & Canadian rapper, Kardinal Offishall. Nargis, made her singing debut with this song. Next, he released a single titled 'Saare Mundeya Nu' which features international pop/ urban artist, Sean Kingston. Parichay also collaborated with Rapper, Fazilpuria, known for his hit song "Kar Gayi Chull" on their single titled "Let's Get The Party Started"

Parichay has also collaborated with actress Sonakshi Sinha on the remake of the classic Bollywood song Tum Mile Dil Khile. Another version of this song was also released and sung by Parichay himself along with singer Jonita Gandhi and features British Asian model & actress Sangeet Samra in the music video.

Parichay's released a Desi Hip Hop track titled 'Champion' which features rappers Pardhaan, Raga, Haji Springer & Ace aka Mumbai. In addition to singing the hook, Parichay has composed and produced the music for this song. It was released by Sony Music India on Feb 28, 2020.

In 2021, Parichay released his 4th studio album titled "Moodz". The album has 10 songs and features Jonita Gandhi, Happy Singh and Haji Springer.

== Discography ==
=== Albums ===
- No Boundaries (2009)
- All New Everything (2012)
- 4 Steps Forward (2014)
- Moodz (2021)
- Shadez (2023)
- Moodz 2 (2023)

=== Bollywood discography ===
Parichay's Bollywood discography is listed below.

Year	Title	Singer	Music director	Lyrics	Album
2011	"Yamla Pagla Deewana Remix"	Parichay, Nindy Kaur	RDB	Anand Bakshi	Yamla Pagla Deewana
2012	"Chandni O Meri Chandni"	Parichay, Sunidhi Chauhan	RDB	Anand Bakshi	Chaar Din Ki Chandni
2014	"Punjabi Wedding Song Remix"	Vishal Dadlani, Parichay, Benny Dayal, Sunidhi Chauhan	Vishal–Shekhar	Amitabh Bhattacharya	Hasee Toh Phasee
2014	"Tarzan"	Anu Malik, Anmol Malik	Parichay	Manoj Yadav	Kuku Mathur Ki Jhand Ho Gayi
2016	"Peene Ki Tamanna"	Vishal Dadlani, Parichay	Parichay	Kumaar	Loveshhuda
2016	"Dono Ke Dono"	Parichay, Neha Kakkar	Parichay	Manoj Yadav	Loveshhuda
2016	"Chitta Kukkad"	Gippy Grewal, Neha Kakkar	Parichay	The Gunsmith	Loveshhuda
2016	"Total Talli"	Parichay, Teesha Nigam	Parichay	Kumaar	Loveshhuda
2016	"Mar Jaayen EDM Remix"	Atif Aslam	Mithoon	Sayeed Qadri	Loveshhuda

=== Singles ===
Year	Title	Notes
2009	"Deewana Tera"	feat. Roach Killa & Blitz
2009	"Kasam Se"	feat. Joe Louis
2012	"Human Machine"	feat. RDB
2012	"Queen of Spades"	
2012	"MAA (Mother's Are Awesome)"	
2013	"She's a Playa"	
2014	"Naye Love Ki Subah"	feat. Shirley Setia
2014	"Tum Habibi"	feat. Joe Louis
2014	"Goli"	Singer: Navraj Hans, Music: Parichay
2017	"Habitaan Vigaad Di"	feat. Nargis Fakhri & Kardinal Offishall
2017	"Saare Mundeya Nu"	feat. Sean Kingston
2017	"Let's Get The Party Started"	feat. Fazilpuria
2018	"Tera Premi"	feat. Roach Killa & Intenso
2018	"Jeeya Mar Ke (Tum Mile Dil Khile)"	feat. Jonita Gandhi
2019	"Jahan Hai Tu"	
2019	"Kyun Roye Akhiyaan"	
2019	"Tu Hi Zindagi"	
2020	"Champion"	feat. Pardhaan, Raga, Haji Springer & Ace aka Mumbai
2020	"Jaana Na Tha"	
2021	"Tera Asar"	
2021	"Din Dhal Gaya"	
2021	"Kinaara"	feat. Farah Mitha
2021	"Mermaid"	
