= Adrián Gorelik =

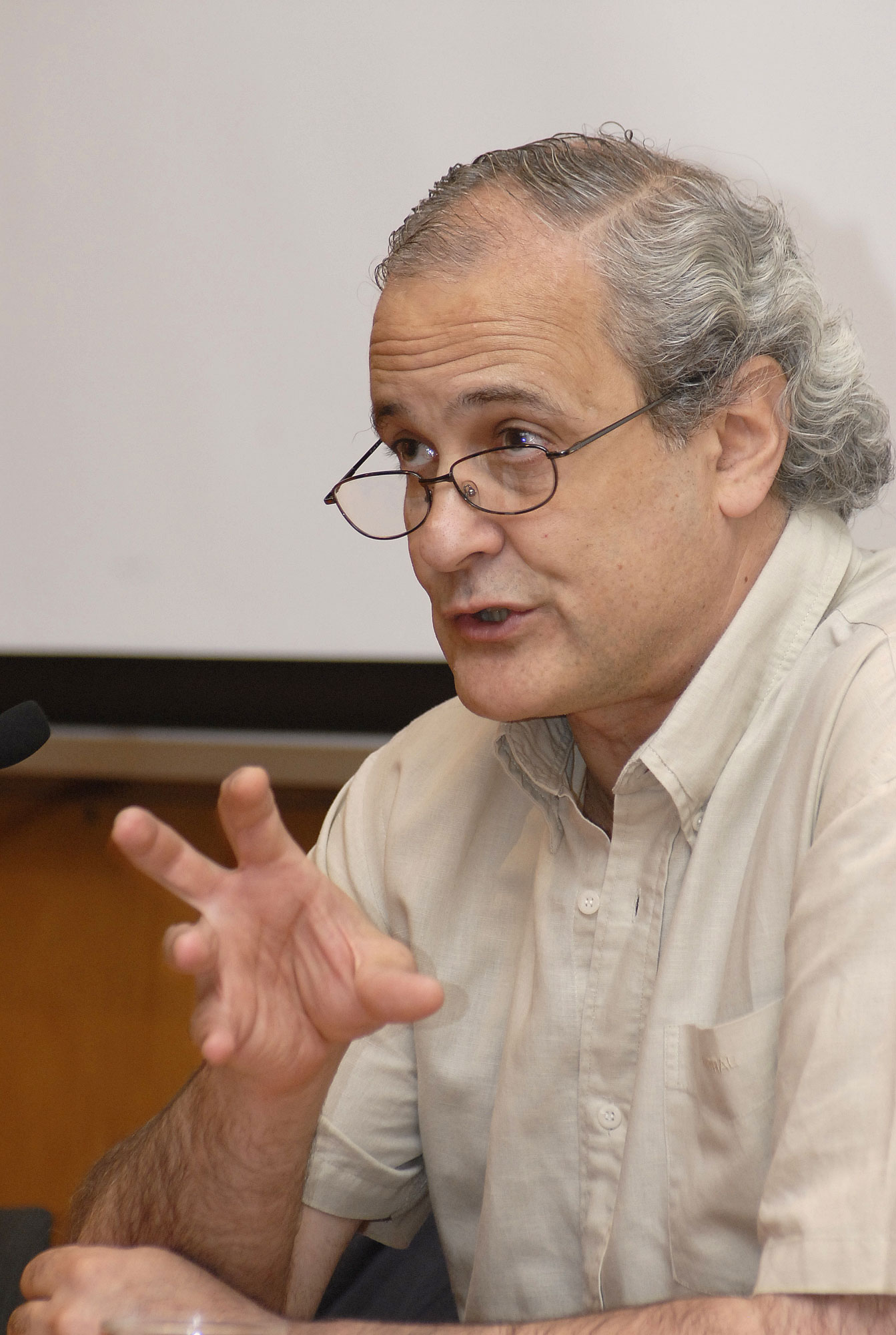
Adrián Gorelik at the Faculty of Arts, Catholic University of Chile in 2009

Adrián Gorelik (Mercedes, Argentina, 1957) is an architect, urban historian and leading commentator on urban issues in Argentina. His most well-known books are La sombra de la vanguardia: Hannes Meyer en México, 1938–1947 (1993, with Jorge Liernur), and La grilla y el parque: Espacio público y cultura urbana en Buenos Aires, 1887–1936 (1998). In 2003 he was awarded a Guggenheim Fellowship for a project entitled "The cycle of invention and critique of the 'Latin American City'".

Gorelik is currently a professor at the National University of Quilmes, Buenos Aires, as well as a researcher in the Intellectual History Program there. In 2002 he was a Visiting Fellow at the Centre of Latin American Studies at the University of Cambridge. Gorelik holds several editorial positions at academic culture and design journals including deputy director at Punto de Vista, Editorial Board member of Prismas. Revista de Historia Intelectual and Block. Revista de cultura de la ciudad y la arquitectura, and Editorial Collective member of Public Culture.

Gorelik received a degree in architecture (1982) and a Ph.D. in History from the University of Buenos Aires (1997).

== Selected publications ==
- "The Past as the Future: A Reactive Utopia in Buenos Aires" (with Graciela Silvestri) in Ana del Sarto, Alicia Rios, Abril Trigo, eds. The Latin American Cultural Studies Reader. Duke University Press, 2004.
- Buenos Aires (with Horacio Coppola Facundo de Zuviria). Lariviere, 2006.
- Miradas Sobre Buenos Aires. Siglo XXI Ediciones, 2004.
- La Grilla y el Parque. Universidad Nacional de Quilmes, 2001.
- Buenos Aires en cuestión. Centro para la Gestión Urbana, 1993.
