= Ramaiya Vastavaiya =

2013 Indian film by Prabhu Deva

- Theatrical release poster
- Directed by: Prabhu Deva
- Screenplay by: Shiraz Ahmed
- Story by: Veeru Potla
- Based on: Nuvvostanante Nenoddantana by Prabhu Deva
- Produced by: Kumar S. Taurani
- Starring: Girish Kumar; Shruti Haasan; Sonu Sood
- Cinematography: Kiran Deohans
- Edited by: Hemal Kothari
- Music by: Songs: Sachin–Jigar; Background Score: Sandeep Shirodkar
- Production company: Tips Industries
- Distributed by: Tips Industries
- Release date: 19 July 2013
- Running time: 148 minutes
- Country: India
- Language: Hindi
- Box office: ₹38.34 crore

Ramaiya Vastavaiya (transl. Rama will you come? or "Lord Rama, you will come") is a 2013 Indian Hindi-language romantic comedy drama film directed by Prabhu Deva and produced by Kumar S. Taurani, under Tips Industries. The film stars debutant Girish Kumar alongside Shruti Haasan in lead roles. It is a remake of the director's own Telugu film Nuvvostanante Nenoddantana. The film was released on 19 July 2013.

== Plot ==
Ram Kapoor is a rich city boy born to billionaire parents Siddhant and Ashwini and brought up in Australia. On the other hand, Sona Singh is a traditional, simple desi girl from Punjab who is brought up by her only brother, Raghuveer Singh. Raghu is heartbroken when their father marries another woman and throws them out of the house, humiliating them on the way. Their mother dies, and her tomb is built on the small land they own until Lala, their Zamindar, tells them that it is his land since their mother had taken a loan from the man. Raghuveer volunteers to work day and night to pay off the loan as long as they do not tear down his mother's tomb. Jaiswal agrees, and the local station master Shankar helps them. Slowly, Raghu and Sona grow up. One day, Ria Bhargav, Sona's best friend, comes to their house to invite Sona to their house as she is getting married. Ram also arrives on the same day with Ashwini, whose brother Krishna Kant Bhargav is Ria's father.

Slowly, Ram and Sona fall in love, but Ashwini does not bear it as Sona is not as rich as them and is thus not to their standards; Ram is also to be married to Krishna Kant's business partner Jay Prakash's daughter, Dolly. Ashwini humiliates Sona as well as Raghu, who arrives a minute before, and both are thrown out of the house after Ashwini accuses them of trying to entice and trap Ram. When Ram learns of this, he goes to Sona's house and pleads with Raghu to accept him. Raghu gives him a chance, just like he was given a chance by Lala when he was little. Ram is tasked to take care of the cows, clean up after them, and grow more crops than Raghu by the end of the season; if he does not, Ram will be thrown out of the village and can never see Sona again.

Lala and his son Ajay are not happy, as Ajay wants to marry Sona. With them and Dolly and her father trying to get Ram to lose the competition, Ram has to work hard for his love, eating red chillies and rice every day, even though he cannot bear it. Through many antics from Lala's side and Jay Prakash's side, Ram eventually proves his love for Sona to Raghu and succeeds in growing more grains. However, Rao, Jay Prakash, Ajay, and Lala kidnap Sona, and then later they try to forcibly marry her to Ajay. Ram kills Rao and Ajay, and Raghu brutally beats Jay Prakash and Lala. Raghu, after realising that Ram and Sona should be together, takes the blame for this and spends seven years in prison. The film ends with Raghu's release from prison, which is also when Sona and Ram get married, in everyone's presence. Ashwini then accepts Sona as her daughter-in-law.

== Cast ==
- Girish Kumar as Ram Kapoor
- Shruti Haasan as Sona Singh
  - Jiya Khan as Little Sona
- Sonu Sood as Raghuveer 'Raghu' Singh, Sona's elder brother
  - Namit Shah as Little Raghu
- Randhir Kapoor as Siddhanth Kapoor, Ram's father
- Poonam Dhillon as Ashwini Kapoor, Ram's mother
- Vinod Khanna as Station Master Shankar
- Paresh Ganatra as Bijlee
- Satish Shah as Krishna Kant Bhargav, Ram's maternal uncle
- Nassar as Jay Prakash (J.P.), Krishna Kant's business partner
- Govind Namdev as Zamindar Lala
- Sarfaraz Khan as Ajay, Lala's son
- Zakir Hussain as Rao
- Anchal Singh as Ria Bhargav, Ram's cousin and Sona's best friend
- Anshul Trivedi as Anshul, Ria's husband
- Kenisha Awasthi as Dolly Prakash, J.P.'s daughter
- Aarti Puri as Gauri
- Shiraz Ahmed as Jailor
- Harry Josh as Afzal
- Puja Banerjee in a cameo appearance
- Ganesh Acharya in a song ‘Peecha Chhute’
- Prabhu Deva in a special appearance in song "Jaadu Ki Jhappi"
- Jacqueline Fernandez as an item number "Jaadu Ki Jhappi"

== Production ==
The filming began on 1 August 2012 in Mumbai. The film had also completed a schedule in Himachal Pradesh. It had been announced that the film would be a remake of director Prabhu Deva's Telugu Film directorial debut Nuvvostanante Nenodantana. It was declared a hit by Box Office India.

== Soundtrack ==
Ramaiya Vastavaiya

Soundtrack album by Sachin–Jigar
- Released: 28 May 2013
- Recorded: 2012–2013
- Genre: Film soundtrack
- Label: Tips Industries Limited
- Producer: Sachin–Jigar

Sachin–Jigar chronology
| Go Goa Gone (2013) | Ramaiya Vastavaiya (2013) | Issaq (2013) |

The first song promo of the film was released on 10 May 2013, under the title of "Jeene Laga Hoon", sung by Atif Aslam and Shreya Ghoshal. The song was uploaded on the Tips Music Films YouTube channel (tipsmusic), and the full soundtrack was released on 28 May 2013. All songs of this album are composed by Sachin–Jigar, and all lyrics of the songs are written by Priya Saraiya.

The film score is composed by Sandeep Shirodkar.

=== Track listing ===
| No. | Title | Singer(s) | Length |
|---|---|---|---|
| 1. | "Jeene Laga Hoon" | Atif Aslam, Shreya Ghoshal | 3:57 |
| 2. | "Hip Hop Pammi" | Mika Singh, Monali Thakur | 3:40 |
| 3. | "Bairiyaa" | Atif Aslam, Shreya Ghoshal | 4:08 |
| 4. | "Peecha Chhute" | Mohit Chauhan | 3:47 |
| 5. | "Rang Jo Lagyo" | Atif Aslam, Shreya Ghoshal | 4:56 |
| 6. | "Jadoo Ki Jhappi" | Neha Kakkar, Mika Singh | 3:37 |
| 7. | "Jadoo Ki Jhappi (Reprise)" | Mika Singh, Neha Kakkar | 2:11 |
| Total length: | | | 29:57 |

== Release ==
The film was released on 19 July 2013. The Times of India gave the film 3 out of 5 stars saying that "this one's like a pretty field decked up in celebration, but with real harvest to show". Paloma Sharma of Rediff wrote "All in all, Ramaiya Vastavaiya will leave you with a couple of good laughs, if nothing else". Nicole Herrington of NYTimes wrote "Hardly any of it is convincing and the proceedings are rife with cliches". Danny Bowes of Rogerebert.com gave it 2.5/4 stars and wrote "“Ramaiyana Vastavaiya” is in the unfortunate position of being a well-made piece of popular entertainment that fails in its most essential purpose: as a film made expressly to launch its male lead to stardom, it can’t be regarded as a full success if it fails to do so".
