= Neil Levine (art historian) =

American art historian

- Born: Neil Arthur Levine; 1941 (age 84–85); United States
- Occupations: Art historian Educator
- Awards: Slade Professor of Fine Art (1994-1995); Guggenheim Fellowship (2003); Fellow of the American Academy of Arts and Sciences (2010)

Academic background
- Education: Princeton University; Yale University
- Thesis: Architectural Reasoning in the Age of Positivism: The Neo-Grec Idea of Henri Labrouste's Bibliotheque Sainte-Genevieve (1975)
- Doctoral advisor: Vincent Scully
- Influences: Donald Drew Egbert; Robert Rosenblum

Academic work
- Discipline: Art history
- Sub-discipline: Frank Lloyd Wright
- Institutions: Harvard University

Neil Levine (born 1941) is an architectural and art historian and educator. An authority on modern architecture, in particular, Frank Lloyd Wright and nineteenth-century France, he is the Emmet Blakeney Gleason Professor of History of Art and Architecture emeritus at Harvard University where he taught from 1973 until his retirement in 2014. He has authored, co-authored, and edited over fifteen books and published more than fifty articles and reviews on subjects ranging from Wright, Beaux-Arts and Postmodern architecture to the sculpture of Donald Judd.

== Early life and education ==
Levine was born in Brooklyn, N.Y. Having applied to Princeton University at the age of fifteen, he was told to wait a year. He spent most of that year in France, where he received a Certificat in the Cours de Civilisation Française at the Sorbonne. After two and a half years at Princeton, he dropped out, during which time he co-authored with Yves Klein the artist's celebrated Chelsea Hotel text.

Back at Princeton, he majored in art history and became the arts editor of the Daily Princetonian. His senior honors thesis was about the much maligned and until then totally neglected classical tradition of Beaux-Arts architecture in the United States, which established his reputation early on as someone willing to tackle unpopular subjects.

Before continuing on to graduate school at Yale, he spent two years in New York. During the first he served as news editor of Architectural Record and the second as an editorial associate at ARTNews, writing monthly reviews. At Yale, where he earned his Ph.D. degree in 1975, he did his dissertation on Henri Labrouste and the Bibliothèque Sainte-Geneviève under Vincent Scully.

Its main argument formed the basis of his contribution to the book, edited by Arthur Drexler, that was published in conjunction with the Museum of Modern Art's pathbreaking exhibition The Architecture of the École des Beaux-Arts (1975–76) on which Levine collaborated.

His essay, which introduced to contemporary scholarship Victor Hugo's theory of the death of architecture at the hands of the printing press and Labrouste's involvement with Hugo's idea, was described by the architectural historian Barry Bergdoll as "the tour-de-force intellectual exercise of Drexler's book. Self-consciously struggling to deconstruct Giedion's view of Labrouste as a proto-modernist engineer-architect, Levine at once resituated Labrouste's undertaking in the complex cultural moment of French Romanticism of the 1830s and made a case for 'legibility' as the chief characteristic of that Romanticism."

== Career ==
Levine began teaching at Harvard in 1973 as an Instructor. When he received his Ph.D. degree two years later, he was promoted to Assistant Professor, Associate Professor with tenure in 1978, and full professor two years later. He served as department chair for six years, from 1984 to 1990, when he was named the Emmet Blakeney Gleason Professor of History of Art and Architecture.

Beginning in the later 1970s, his scholarly interest shifted from nineteenth-century France to Frank Lloyd Wright.

Following a road trip across the United States to visit over 150 Wright buildings, Levine began publishing articles on the architect that culminated in his The Architecture of Frank Lloyd Wright, published by Princeton University Press in 1996, which was selected for the CHOICE List of Outstanding Academic Books for 1996 and for the Association of American Publishers Annual Award in Architecture and Urban Planning for 1996.

Ten years later, he published a pendant volume covering Wright's large-scale planning projects, The Urbanism of Frank Lloyd Wright. Also published by Princeton University Press, it received the First-Place PROSE Award in Architecture & Urban Planning, 2017 from the Professional and Scholarly Division of the American Association of Publishers.

As a result of his expertise in Wright's architecture, Levine served on the advisory board and as a talking head in the PBS film "Frank Lloyd Wright" by Ken Burns and Lynn Novick (1993–98), followed by talking head roles in BBC's "Frank Lloyd Wright" and PBS's documentary of “Frank Lloyd Wright’s Buffalo,” both aired in 2006.

He also produced with Tim Sakamoto in 2010 a DVD on “Frank Lloyd Wright’s Guggenheim Museum." From 1996 until 2022, he served on the board of the Frank Lloyd Wright Building Conservancy under whose auspices he helped draft the World Heritage List Frank Lloyd Wright Serial Nomination.

At the same time as he became involved in these non-academic activities, his own scholarly pursuits turned toward other aspects of twentieth-century architecture and culture, ranging from Mies van der Rohe, Louis Kahn, and Philip Johnson to Robert Venturi, postmodernism, and the "long history" of modern architecture going back to the mid-eighteenth century.

His theoretical understanding of this development as a movement away from neoclassical representation to functionalist abstraction was laid out in the 2009 publication by Yale University Press of his Modern Architecture: Representation and Reality.

Most recently, he returned to his earlier work on French architecture to produce Architecture of Reading in Public: Henri Labrouste's Bibliothèque Sainte-Geneviève, published by Yale University Press in 2025, and Between Religious Symbol and Civic Landmark: The Architecture of the Church in Nineteenth Century France (University of Virginia Press, expected 2026). He has also written the first historical overview of The Sculpture of Donald Judd, to be published by Yale University Press in 2026; and the first history of postmodern architecture, covering the years from the late 1950s through the 2020s.

In 2014, Levine retired from teaching at Harvard. Two years later, Levine donated his collection of architectural drawings, over three hundred in total, by artists such as Félix Duban and Jacques Ignace Hittorff to the Musée d'Orsay in Paris.

== Awards ==
Levine has been the recipient of Fulbright Grant to Paris (1968–69); a Foerster Humanities Fellowship (1976); an American Council of Learned Societies Fellowship (1977-78); several Graham Foundation for Advanced Studies in the Fine Arts Fellowships (1983, 1995, 2008, and 2024–25); the Walter Channing Cabot Fellowship, Harvard University (1996–97); the John Simon Guggenheim Memorial Foundation Fellowship (2003–04); a National Endowment for the Humanities Fellowship (2012-13); and a Furthermore Grant from the J. M. Kaplan Fund (2024). Over the course of his career, Levine filled numerous named lectureships, including the Preston Thomas Memorial Lectureship, Cornell University (1980); Mathews Lectureship, Columbia University, (1982); and Cullinan Lectureship, Rice University (2010). He has served as the Sir Banister Fletcher Visiting Professor and Lecturer at the Bartlett School of Architecture and Planning, University College, London (1989–90); the Slade Professor of Fine Art, University of Cambridge (1994–95); a Phi Beta Kappa Visiting Scholar (1996–97); and Astor Visiting Lecturer, St. John's College, University of Oxford (2016).

In 2010, Levine was elected to the American Academy of Arts and Sciences; and in 2018 was awarded the Gold Medal in History of Art by the Académie d'Architecture in Paris. In 2025, he was given the Wright Spirit Award by the Frank Lloyd Wright Building Conservancy.

== Personal life ==
Levine was married twice. He met Gillian McManigal, a curator and music promoter, in his senior year at Princeton. They moved to New York together when he graduated, then to Cambridge and then, on and off, to Paris, where they were married. A year after she died (2001), Levine established a relationship with Susan Jacobs Lockhart, an artist and pianist, who grew up in Wright's first Usonian house which her parents commissioned in 1936. Lockhart left Taliesin Fellowship in 2003 to live with Levine in Cambridge, MA, and Paris, where Levine had bought an apartment in 2001.

After his retirement in 2014, they spent about half the year in the United States and half in France, in Paris and in the Morvan in a converted farmhouse they purchased together in 2018. Lockhart died four years later. Levine continues to divide his time between France and America, devoted to research and writing.

== Selected works ==
- Levine, Neil (April 15, 2025). "The Mailer-Scully Debate". Architectural Forum: A Prelude to Postmodernism," Log 63. Anyone Corporation. ISBN 979-8991547215.
- Levine, Neil (2023). Levine, Neil; Longstreth, Richard W. (eds.). Rethinking Frank Lloyd Wright: history, reception, preservation. Charlottesville: University of Virginia Press. ISBN 978-0-8139-4769-3.
- Wright, Frank Lloyd; Levine, Neil; Jacobs Aitken, Elizabeth; Desmond, Michael; Jacobs, William Wescott (2022). Frank Lloyd Wright's Jacobs houses: experiments in modern living (1st ed.). Chandler, Arizona: OA+D Archives Press. ISBN 978-1-938938-63-4.
- The Urbanism of Frank Lloyd Wright, 2015 ISBN 9780691167534
- Levine, Neil (2012-09-01). "The Template of Photography in Nineteenth-century Architectural Representation". Journal of the Society of Architectural Historians. 71 (3): 306–331. doi:10.1525/jsah.2012.71.3.306. ISSN 0037-9808.
- Modern Architecture: Representation and Reality, 2010 ISBN 9780300145670
- Levine, Neil (2009). Ballon, Hilary; Solomon R. Guggenheim Museum (eds.). The Guggenheim: Frank Lloyd Wright and the making of the modern museum; [... the 50th anniversary of the Solomon R. Guggenheim Museum, New York]. New York, NY: Guggenheim Museum. ISBN 978-0-89207-385-6.
- Wright, Frank Lloyd; Levine, Neil (2008). Modern architecture: being the Kahn lectures for 1930. Princeton monographs in art and archaeology (1st ed.). Princeton [ N.J.]: Princeton University Press. ISBN 978-0-691-12937-2.
- Levine, Neil; Hertzberg, Mark (January 1, 2006). Frank Lloyd Wright's Hardy House (1st ed.). Pomegranate. p. 80. ISBN 978-0764937613.
- Scully, Vincent; Levine, Neil (2003). Modern architecture and other essays. Princeton, NJ: Princeton University Press. ISBN 978-0-691-07441-2.
- The Architecture of Frank Lloyd Wright, 1996 ISBN 0691033714
- Lipman, Jonathan; Levine, Neil; Wright, Frank Lloyd (1992). The Wright state: Frank Lloyd Wright in Wisconsin. Milwaukee Art Museum. Milwaukee, Wis.: Milwaukee Art Museum. ISBN 978-0-944110-27-0.

== See also ==
- List of American Academy of Arts and Sciences members (2006–2019)
- List of Guggenheim Fellowships awarded in 2003
- List of Princeton University people
- List of Yale University people
