= Girish Kumar =

Indian actor

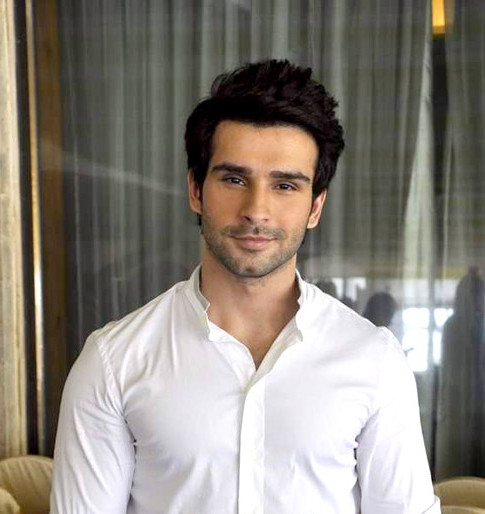
- Girish promoting his film Ramaiya Vastavaiya in 2013.
- Born: Girish Kumar; 30 January 1989 (age 37); Mumbai, Maharashtra, India
- Occupation: Actor
- Years active: 2013–2018
- Known for: Ramaiya Vastavaiya
- Father: S.Taurani
- Relatives: Ramesh S.Taurani (uncle)

Girish Kumar (born 30 January 1989) is an Indian actor working in the Hindi film industry. Kumar made his Bollywood debut with the romantic comedy film Ramaiya Vastavaiya (2013).

== Career ==
An ethnic Sindhi Hindus, Kumar was signed for the Bollywood romance film Ramaiya Vastavaiya, directed by Prabhu Deva and produced by his father S.Taurani. In order to build the physique required for the film, Kumar had to undergo a strict regimen of training and diet for three years. He had also learned surfing for the film.

In 2016, Girish played Gaurav in Loveshhuda, a romantic comedy opposite Navneet Kaur Dhillon. The film received unfavorable reviews from critics and was unsuccessful at the box office. He next starred in Collateral Damage, a short film on an archaic practice that exists in villages. The film was released on 29 November 2018 and was screened at many film festivals.

== Filmography ==
Year	Title	Role	Notes
2013	Ramaiya Vastavaiya	Ram Kapoor	Nominated–Screen Award for Best Male Debut; Nominated–BIG Star Award for Most Entertaining Actor (Film) Debut – Male; Nominated–Apsara Award for Best Male Debut
2016	Loveshhuda	Gaurav Mehra	
2018	Collateral Damage	Sameer Singh	Short film

== See also ==
- List of Indian film actors
