= Chitta Kukkar =

Punjabi folk song

"Chitta Kukkar" (or Chitta Kukkad; lit. 'white rooster') is a Punjabi folk song in the tappa style which is sung mainly at weddings.

One of the earliest recordings was by Pakistani singer Musarrat Nazir in 1988. In 2016, singers Neha Kakkar and Gippy Grewal recorded a version of the folk song for the 2016 Indian Hindi-language film Loveshhuda, with music by Parichay and lyrics by The Gunsmith. In 2021, music director Manan Bhardwaj recorded the folk song with slight variation in both lyrics and tune as a partially sad song for the Indian Hindi film Shiddat as "Chitta".

The tappa folk music tune was first recorded for film in the song "Kahe Nainon Mein Kajra Bharo" (lit. 'Why should I decorate my eyes with kohl'), for the 1951 Indian Hindi film Badi Bahu, by singers Mukesh and Lata Mangeshkar, with music by Anil Biswas and lyrics by Prem Dhawan. Later, the same tune was reused for the song "Tum Rooth Ke Mat Jaana" (lit. 'Don't leave with a broken heart'), from the 1958 Indian Hindi film Phagun, sung by Mohammed Rafi and Asha Bhosle, composed by O.P. Nayyar and with lyrics by Qamar Jalalabadi. Jagjit Singh and Chitra Singh released a version of the tappa as "Kothe Te Aa Mahiya" (lit. 'Come to the rooftop, my love'). The tune was again used in the song "Yaar Kapda Shandar Hai" (lit. 'This cloth is beautiful') from the 1983 Indian Hindi film Painter Babu which was sung by Mahendra Kapoor and Bhupinder Singh with lyrics by Qamar Jalalabadi.

The tappa folk tune was sampled for the 2018 Punjabi-language song, "Lamberghini" by Indian singer-songwriters The Doorbeen, featuring Ragini Tandan. The Doorbeen song was remade as "Lamborghini" by the Meet Bros, featuring Neha Kakkar and Jassi Gill, for the 2020 Indian Hindi film Jai Mummy Di. The tune was used again in the song "O Mahey Naina Vich Vasda Ey Yaar", sung by Gurshabad Singh and Chayanika Gargg for the 2023 Indian Hindi film Akelli. Another 2023 song "Agar Tujhe Ho Gaya Kuchh Saari Duniya Jala Denge" (lit. 'I'll burn the world down if something happens to you') by B Praak and Jaani, for the Indian Hindi film Animal, also samples the folk tune.

== See also ==
- Wedding music
- Music of Punjab
- List of Pakistani wedding songs
- Hindi wedding songs
