= Philip J. Kiviat =

American computer scientist

Philip J. Kiviat (born October 15, 1937) is noted, along with Alan Pritsker, for half a century of work on computer simulation.

== Biography ==
Kiviat studied at Cornell University from 1955-1961. While working from 1961-1963 for U.S. Steel Corporation he pioneered the development of the original GASP software, which was later enhanced by Alan Pritsker to form GASP II. After moving to RAND Corporation in 1964, Kiviat worked with Harry Markowitz to produce SIMSCRIPT II.

His subsequent work at the 1972-founded Federal Systems Integration and Management Center (FEDSIM) earned him recognition as "the simulation czar of the federal government."

He is also known for the eponymous Kiviat Graph (also identified as a Kiviat diagram, Kiviat chart, Polar chart or Radar chart).

=== View of the future ===
In a 2013 interview about the future of simulation software in the hands of non-professionals, he said "I saw above the door to the MIT simulation lab back in the early 1960s which was SINSFIT - Simulation is No Substitute For Intelligent Thinking."

Following years with FEDSIM, Kiviat went "into management and selling."
