= Germán Leopoldo García =

Argentine writer and psychoanalyst

Germán Leopoldo García (December 25, 1944 – December 26, 2018) was an Argentine writer and psychoanalyst.

== Biography ==
García was born in the city of Junín in 1944, later moving to Buenos Aires in 1961. In 1968, he published his first novel, "Nanina," under the Jorge Álvarez Publishing House. The first two editions of his work were sold out. However the book was later banned by the military dictatorship of Juan Carlos Onganía.:

He was a member of the editorial board of the "Los Libros" Magazine. In 1973, he also founded the magazine "Literal", with fellow writers Osvaldo Lamborghini and Luis Gusmán. Between June and December of the same year, he was a member of the advisory group of Leónidas Lamborghini at the Culture Secretary, at La Plata (Buenos Aires’ Ministry of Education). In 1974, he was part of the group that accompanied Oscar Masotta in the foundation of the Buenos Aires Freudian School (Escuela Freudiana de Buenos Aires).

In 1979, he settled in Barcelona, Spain, where he continued the work started by Masotta, who had died in the same year. García was part of the management of Barcelona's Psychoanalysis School (Escuela de Psicoanálisis de Barcelona), also becoming the director of the magazine "Sinthoma."

He returned to Buenos Aires in 1985, where he created the International Psichoanalisys Library (Biblioteca Internacional del Psicoanálisis - BIP) and the magazine "Descartes." In 1992, BIP and other institutions were dissolved to create the Escuela de la Orientación Lacaniana (EOL). In the same year, Germán García created the Fundación Descartes, with the Descartes Centre (Centro Descartes), associated with the Instituto del Campo Freudiano.

Since the inception of the Descartes Foundation (Fundación Descartes), Mr García was a member of the board of headmasters. He was also the president of the EOL Council, and head of the editorial board of the "Revista Lacaniana de Psicoanálisis." Since 1992, he worked as a psychoanalyst member of the Escuela de la Orientación Lacaniana (AME) and the World Association of Psychoanalysis (AMP). Moreover, he was co-founder of the Instituto Oscar Masotta and a member of the Sociedad Argentina de Escritores.

In 2003, Mr García won the Guggenheim Fellowship, because of his research published under the title "El psicoanálisis y los debates culturales" (Paidós Publishing House).

In 2007, he received the recognition of "meritorious of culture" conferred by the Buenos Aires’ City Legislature (Legislatura de la Ciudad de Buenos Aires). In 2008, he was granted honorary citizenship by the Municipality of the city of Jujuy, and in 2009, by the Municipality of the historic city of San Miguel de Tucumán.

In 2011, the Argentina's National Library (Biblioteca Nacional de la República Argentina) published a full replica version of the "Literal" magazine, edited by Juan José Mendoza.

In 2014, Mr García received an honorary PhD degree from Cordoba's National University (Universidad Nacional de Córdoba), and in 2017 another honorary PhD degree from San Martin National University (Universidad Nacional de San Martín.)

Germán Leopoldo García died on December 26, 2018, in the city of Buenos Aires, a day after celebrating his 74th birthday.

== Awards and honors ==
Others awards and honors

In 2016, he won the Heterónimos de Ensayo award.

From 2012 to 2013, he served as a member of the jury for the national literary production promotion system of the Fondo Nacional de las Artes.

He was also a member of the jury for the "Eduardo Mallea" and "Ricardo Rojas" Special Awards Contest, organised by the City of Buenos Aires’ Ministry of Culture (biennium 2007/2009 and 2009/2011).

From 2009, he was a member of the editorial board of the indexed journal in Latindex (Caycit-Conicet) Exordio. El psicoanálisis en la cultura. Centro de Investigación y Estudios Clínicos (CIEC). Cizalla ediciones, Córdoba. Régimen de Fomento.

From 2007, he was a member of the arbitration committee of the Revista Universitaria de Psicoanálisis, a publication with reference from the Faculty of Psychology of the University of Buenos Aires, and a member of the Scientific Committee of the Encuentro Argentino de Historia de la Psiquiatría, la Psicología y el Psicoanálisis.

Since 2004, he was a member of the Academic Scientific Committee of the journal Estudios del Centro de Estudios Avanzados at the National University of Córdoba, directed by Héctor Schmucler. On November 27, 2004, he received the Recorrido Dorado award "Fundación Ángel Peco" from the Sociedad de Distribuidores de Diarios, Revistas y Afines for his distinguished work.

In 1991, he was awarded the first honorary diploma from the Biblioteca del Campo Freudiano in Barcelona (Catalunya Section of the European School of Psychoanalysis).

In 1969, García won the first literary prize of the Secretaría de Cultura of Junín, Buenos Aires province.

== Notable works ==
=== Novels ===
- 1968 - "Nanina". Editorial Jorge Álvarez, Buenos Aires.
- 1969 - "Cancha Rayada". Editorial Jorge Álvarez, Buenos Aires.
- 1975 - "La Vía Regia". Editorial Corregidor, Buenos Aires.
- 1983 - "Perdido". Editorial Montesinos, Barcelona (Spain).
- 1999 - "Parte de la fuga". Ediciones de la Flor, Buenos Aires.
- 2004 - "La fortuna". Ediciones de la Flor, Buenos Aires.
- 2016 - "Miserere". Editorial Mansalva, Buenos Aires.

=== Essays ===
- 1969 - "Hablan de Macedonio Fernández". Germán García, Carlos Pérez Editor, Buenos Aires, 1969. 2ª ed., Atuel, Bs. As., 1996.
- 1974 - "Saber de la Gradiva". Editorial Noe, Buenos Aires.
- 1975 - "Macedonio Fernández, la escritura en objeto". Siglo XXI, Buenos Aires, 1975; 2ºed, Adriana Hidalgo Editora, Buenos Aires, 2000.
- 1978 - "La otra psicopatología". Hachette, Buenos Aires.
- 1978 - "La entrada del psicoanálisis en la Argentina". Editorial Altazor, Buenos Aires; 2ª ed., Editorial Catálogos, Bs. As., 2005
- 1980 - "Oscar Masotta y el psicoanálisis en castellano". Argonauta, Barcelona (Spain); 2ª ed. Puntosur, Buenos Aires, Argentina, 1991.
- 1980 - "Psicoanálisis, política del síntoma". Editorial Alcrudo, Zaragoza (Spain.)
- 1983 - "Psicoanálisis dicho de otra manera". Pre-textos, Valencia (Spain.)
- 1990 - "Formación, clínica y ética". Editorial Catálogos, Buenos Aires.
- 1992 - "Oscar Masotta, los ecos de un nombre". Editorial Eolia, Barcelona (Spain.)
- 1992 - "Gombrowicz, el estilo y la heráldica". Editorial Atuel, Buenos Aires.
- 2000 - "D’Escolar (ensayos sobre psicoanálisis)". Editorial Atuel, Buenos Aires.
- 2003 - "La virtud indicativa. Psicoanálisis y literatura". Colección Diva, Buenos Aires.
- 2003 - "Fuego Amigo. Cuando escribí sobre Osvaldo Lamborghini". Grama ediciones, Buenos Aires.
- 2005 - "El psicoanálisis y los debates culturales". Editorial Paidós, Buenos Aires.
- 2007 - "Fundamentos de la clínica analítica". Otium Ediciones, San Miguel de Tucumán.
- 2009 - "En torno a las identificaciones". Otium Ediciones, San Miguel de Tucumán.
- 2011 - "Variaciones sobre psicosis". Otium Ediciones, San Miguel de Tucumán.
- 2011 - "Para otra cosa. El psicoanálisis entre las vanguardias". Liber Editores, Buenos Aires.
- 2014 - "Diversiones psicoanalíticas.". Otium Ediciones, Buenos Aires.
- 2015 - "Derivas analíticas del siglo. Ensayos y errores". UNSAM, Buenos Aires.
- 2018 - "Informes para el psicoanálisis. Una salida." Otium Ediciones, Buenos Aires.
