= Margaret Wiecek =

Polish-American mathematician

Margaret M. Wiecek
- Born: Małgorzata M. Więcek
- Education: Akademia Górniczo-Hutnicza
- Occupation: Mathematician
- Known for: Multiple Criteria Decision Making Gold Medal

Margaret M. Wiecek (also known as Małgorzata M. Więcek) is a Polish-American operations researcher and professor of mathematical sciences at Clemson University, known for her research in multi-objective optimization, Pareto efficiency, robust design, and three-dimensional packing problems in mechanical engineering.

Wiecek earned her Ph.D. from the Akademia Górniczo-Hutnicza in Kraków, Poland, in 1984, under the supervision of Henryk Górecki. She joined the Clemson faculty in 1988.

Wiecek was president of the INFORMS section on Multiple Criteria Decision Making for 2016–2017. In 2019, the International Society on Multiple Criteria Decision Making gave Wiecek their highest award, the Multiple Criteria Decision Making Gold Medal.
