= Sam Wells (filmmaker) =

American film director

Sam Wells (November 4, 1950 – June 3, 2011) was an American experimental filmmaker and photographer based in Princeton, New Jersey. He is best known for the film Wired Angel (1999), an avant-garde feature inspired by the life and trial of Joan of Arc. Filmed on high-contrast black-and-white reversal film and featuring a musical score written by Academy Award-winning composer Joe Renzetti, Wired Angel was well received at underground film festivals in both Chicago and New York, with Film Threat magazine naming it one of the best unseen films of 2001.

Wells' 1990 short film The Talking Rain played at the 1991 Sundance Film Festival. He exhibited sections of his Vietnam-inspired film and digital media installation Fragrance of Ghosts at William Paterson University in 2007.

Wells was awarded a Guggenheim Fellowship in 2003. In 2006, he was the recipient of an Artist Fellowship from the New Jersey State Council on the Arts.

== Filmography ==
- Early Shorts (1974–1979)
  - Endymion
  - Woman of Light
  - Angels of Winter
  - Miari Miare Remir
  - Self Portrait
  - Crucifixion/Lux in diafana
  - Landscape
  - Realm
- The Talking Rain (1990)
- Wired Angel (1999)
- Lucent Membranes (2008–2011)

Installations

- Fragrance of Ghosts/Huong (2004–2011)
  - Kieu
  - Vinh Long Garden
  - The Willow Sees The Heron's Image Upside-Down
