= Lee Schruben =

Industrial engineer

Lee W. Schruben (born 1946) is an American educator, engineer and serves as the Professor and Past Chair, Department of Industrial Engineering and Operations Research College of Engineering, University of California at Berkeley. He is the former Andrew Schultz, Jr. Professor (1976–1998), Sibley College of Engineering, Cornell University, Department of Operations Research. Professor Schruben took his Bachelor of Science at Cornell’s engineering college in 1968, his Master of Science at the University of North Carolina in 1973 and his doctorate at Yale University in 1974.

== Expertise ==
Schruben specializes in teaching and research on simulation experiments, optimization of simulation system response, and simulation modeling foundations. He is a leading researcher in discrete event simulation. Professor Schruben studies data from experiments and develops coverage functions to study confidence interval performance of parameters arising from simulations. He also introduced the method of standardized time series, a major breakthrough in the simulation field. In February 2005, Schruben invented a simulation technique consisting of cost and productivity management software for use in fast simulators. Schruben’s technique has been proven to be up to seventy times more rapid than job-driven simulation approaches.

== Honors ==
In recognition of his work in the area of output analysis, Schruben received an Outstanding Publication Award from the Institute of Management Science's College on Simulation and Gaming for his output analysis work. In 2017 he received the INFORMS Simulation Society's Lifetime Professional Achievement Award, the highest honor in his field, given occasionally, but at most once a year.

== Member ==
Professor Schruben joined the Phi Kappa Psi fraternity at Cornell, and through that organization, the Irving Literary Society.

== Sample publications ==
- Chan, W.K. Victor, and Lee W. Schruben, (2008), Optimization Models of Discrete- Event System Dynamics, Operations Research
- David C. Juran, and Lee W. Schruben, (2006), Using Worker Personality and Demographic Information to Improve System Performance Prediction, Journal of Operations Management
- Nuno Gil, Iris D. Tommelein, Iris D., and Lee W. Schruben, (2006), External Change in Large Engineering Design Projects: The Role of the Client, IEEE Trans. on Engineering Management
- Swisher, J. R., P. D. Hyden, S. H. Jacobson, and L. W. Schruben (2005), "A Survey Of Recent Advances In Discrete Input Parameter Discrete-Event Simulation Optimization", IIE Transactions
- Savage, E. L., Schruben, L. W., and Yűcesan, E. (2005). On the Generality of Event- Graph Models. INFORMS J. on Computing 17
- Juran, D. C., and L. W. Schruben "Using Worker Personality and Demographic Information to Improve System Performance Prediction", Journal of Operations Management
- Schruben, L. W., and T. M. Roeder, "Fast Simulations of Large-Scale Highly-Congested Systems." Transactions of the Society for Modeling and Simulation International
- Kimes, Sheryl E. and Lee W. Schruben, "Golf course revenue management: A study of tee time intervals" Journal of Revenue and Pricing Management
- Morrice, D. and L.W. Schruben, "A Frequency Domain Metamodeling Approach to Transient Sensitivity Analysis," IIE Transactions
- Allore, H.G. and L.W. Schruben, "Disease Management Research Using Event Graphs," Computers and Biomedical Research
