= Loveshhuda =

2016 film

- Theatrical release poster
- Directed by: Vaibhav Misra
- Written by: Screenplay: Vaibhav Misra; Pankaj Matta; Dialogues: Abbas Dalal; Hussain Dalal
- Story by: Vaibhav Misra
- Produced by: Vijay Galani; Pratik Galani
- Starring: Girish Kumar; Navneet Kaur Dhillon; Naveen Kasturia
- Cinematography: Bijitesh De
- Edited by: Utsav Bhagat
- Music by: Songs: Parichay; Mithoon; Background Score: John Stewart Eduri
- Production company: Galani Entertainments Limited
- Distributed by: Tips Industries; White Hill Studios
- Release date: 19 February 2016
- Running time: 133 minutes
- Country: India
- Language: Hindi
- Budget: ₹20 crore
- Box office: ₹3.02 crore

Loveshhuda (lit. 'Loved'; transl. Pure love) is a 2016 Indian romance film produced by Vijay and Pratik Galani, and directed by Vaibhav Misra. The film features Girish Kumar, Navneet Kaur Dhillon and Naveen Kasturia in leading roles. The film was scheduled for release on 5 February 2016, but the release date was postponed to 19 February 2016.

== Plot ==
Gaurav Mehra (Girish Kumar) is an obedient man who stays in London and is getting ready for his wedding to Vandana, a dominating and finicky woman. His friend Kunal (Naveen Kasturia) arrives for the wedding and hosts a bachelor's party, which goes awry when a sloshed Gaurav wakes up with a girl Pooja (Navneet Kaur Dhillon). Gaurav being an obedient and well-behaved boy asks Pooja to leave but unable to find her clothes, she ends up wearing a shirt that Gaurav offers which incidentally has been gifted to him by his to-be mother-in-law for his upcoming engagement. He realises the mistake only when Pooja is gone and then starts his search.

Though fuzzy about the details of the previous night, he finally meets Pooja who tells him what exactly transpired the night they were together. Going down the memory lane, which is clubbed with numerous lectures by Pooja on how to live life, Gaurav falls in love with the free-spirited girl. But Gaurav doesn't acknowledge his feelings and ends up marrying Vandana. After a quick jump of four years, Gaurav is divorced and is relentlessly blaming his elder sister (Tisca Chopra) for everything that has gone wrong in his life. To help Gaurav, Kunal suggests going to Mauritius for a vacation. For a break, he lies to his sisters saying that he is going to a business trip, whereas he goes to Mauritius with his friends including Kunal. As luck would have it, Gaurav once again meets Pooja. But now the scenario is reversed; Pooja is set to marry Vinayak Sengupta, a proposal which she had accepted. They both spend more time together only till Pooja realises Gaurav loves her. She tells him about her engagement and urges him to forget her. Gaurav goes back home and has a fight with his sisters. He goes to meet Pooja at her home when he gets her wedding card in his house. There, he meets Vandana and spoils her makeup as a revenge. He then turns to Pooja and requests her to meet him. They meet after the function is over. Pooja asks him to buy her a whiskey and they both start drinking, only to end up spoiling Pooja's father's pots in the front lawn and sleeping with each other for the second time.

Pooja requests Gaurav to leave and never meet her again. Gaurav leaves. At a dhaba with Kunal, Gaurav notices that the baraat has come back which means that Pooja broke the alliance. He reunites with her.

== Cast ==
- Girish Kumar as Gaurav Mehra
- Navneet Kaur Dhillon as Pooja
- Poonam Dhillon as Shalini Mehra, Gaurav's mother
- Darshan Jariwala as Ram Prasad, Gaurav's father
- Meenakshi Sethi as Sandhya Joshi, Pooja's mother
- Sachin Khedekar as Sachin Khurana, Pooja's father
- Farida Dadi as Sonia Mehra, Pooja's grandmother
- Lekh Tandon as Kailash Bhishambhar, Pooja's grandfather
- Naveen Kasturia as Kunal (Gaurav's childhood friend)
- Tisca Chopra as Sheethal Bansal, Gaurav's eldest sister
- Benaf Dadachandji as Shweta, Gaurav's elder sister
- Ali Haji as Rohan Ahuja, Gaurav's eldest brother
- Markand Soni as Raghav, Gaurav's eldest brother
- Yash Pandit as Vinayak SenGupta (Pooja's fiancé)
- Devyani as Neha (Pooja's cousin)
- Kiran Thapar as Geeta (Pooja's friend)
- Savant Singh Premi as Aashish (Gaurav's childhood friend)
- Zaq Qureshi as Rana Singh
- Sachin Parikh as Murali, Gaurav's brother-in-law

== Music ==
Loveshhudaa

Soundtrack album to Loveshhuda by Mithoon, Parichay
- Released: 15 January 2016
- Recorded: 2015
- Genre: Feature film soundtrack
- Length: 43:37
- Language: Hindi
- Label: Tips Industries

Track Listing & Credits
No.	Title	Lyrics	Music	Singer(s)	Length
1.	"Mar Jaayen"	Sayeed Quadri	Mithoon	Atif Aslam	04:17
2.	"Peene Ki Tamanna"	Kumaar	Parichay	Vishal Dadlani, Parichay	03:15
3.	"Dono Ke Dono"	Manoj Yadav	Parichay	Parichay, Neha Kakkar	03:50
4.	"Chitta Kukkad"	Yuvraj Goel (The Gunsmith)	Parichay	Gippy Grewal, Neha Kakkar	03:38
5.	"Total Talli"	Kumaar	Parichay	Parichay, Teesha Nigam	02:48
6.	"Mar Jaayen" (Reprise)	Sayeed Quadri	Mithoon	Atif Aslam	04:08
7.	"Mar Jaayen" (EDM Remix)	Sayeed Quadri	Mithoon, Parichay	Atif Aslam	03:03
8.	"Peene Ki Tamanna" (EDM Remix)	Kumaar	Parichay, The Glowsticks	Vishal Dadlani, Parichay	03:50
9.	"Dono Ke Dono" (Chill Trap Remix)	Manoj Yadav, Parichay	Parichay, Sai Gemini	Parichay, Neha Kakkar	03:44
10.	"Total Talli" (Trap Remix)	Kumaar, Joe Louis	Parichay, Maro Music	Parichay, Teesha Nigam, Joe Louis	03:38
11.	"Chitta Kukkad (Male)" (The Gunsmith)	Yuvraj Goel	Parichay	Gippy Grewal, Neha Kakkar	03:38
12.	"Mar Jaayen" (Radio Edit)	Sayeed Quadri	Mithoon, Parichay	Atif Aslam	03:44
13.	"Mar Jaayen" (More Jabo)	Sayeed Quadri	Arfin Rumey	Sabrina Porshi	03:54
Total length:					43:37
