= Siu-Wai Chan =

Hong Kong engineer (born 1958)

- Born: 27 February 1958 (age 68); British Hong Kong
- Occupation: Engineer
- Awards: Guggenheim Fellow (2003); Fellow of the American Physical Society (2018)

Academic background
- Education: Columbia Engineering; Massachusetts Institute of Technology
- Thesis: Crystallite rotations driven by the variation of grain boundary energy with misorientation (1985)
- Doctoral advisor: Robert Balluffi

Academic work
- Discipline: Ceramics engineering
- Institutions: Bell Labs; Bellcore; Columbia Engineering

Siu-Wai Chan (born 27 February 1958) is a Hong Kong engineer based in the United States. She is Professor of Materials Science and Engineering at the Fu Foundation School of Engineering and Applied Science Department of Applied Physics and Applied Mathematics. A 2003 Guggenheim Fellow and 2018 Fellow of the American Physical Society, she studies ceramic engineering.

== Biography ==
She was born on 27 February 1958 in British Hong Kong. A member of Tau Beta Pi and Sigma Xi, she studied at the Columbia Engineering (where she got her Bachelor of Science degree in materials science and metallurgy in 1980) and Massachusetts Institute of Technology (where she got her Doctor of Science degree in 1985); her doctoral dissertation Crystallite rotations driven by the variation of grain boundary energy with misorientation (1985) was supervised by Robert Balluffi.

After working for Bell Labs and Bellcore in New Jersey in the late-1980s, she returned to Columbia Engineering in 1990 and became associate professor, before being promoted to professor of materials science and engineering in 2002. She also co-chaired Columbia Engineering's Materials Science and Engineering Program and Committee from 1997 until 1999 and Solid State Program from 2001 until 2005.

As an academic, Chan focuses on the size-dependent mechanical properties of the ceramic nanoparticle and the properties behind the electrical workings of device interfaces. She was awarded a Guggenheim Fellowship in 2003 "for a study of new methods of preparing grain-boundary junctions of high temperature superconductors"; she also used this fellowship for work she did as a visiting professor at the University of California, San Diego. She was elected Fellow of the American Ceramic Society in 2008. She was elected Fellow of the American Physical Society in 2018 "for observing and understanding the grain boundary dislocation motion in materials, providing a seminal impact on superconducting thin film boundary devices, and inventing a novel ecological synthesis technique of nano-crystals oxides for catalysis applications."
