= Event relationship graph =

Directed graph type

Event relationship graphs (ERGs) are a type of directed graph (with labeled and annotated vertices and annotated edges) used for modeling discrete-event systems. Like Petri Nets, ERGs provide a model for concurrent computation. ERGs have the full power of Turing machines.
