= List of Pakistani wedding songs =

This list contains Pakistani wedding songs which are performed during Pakistani weddings. Most are traditional folk songs, but also include pop songs as well.

Title	Artist(s)	Language	Description
Sammi Meri Waar	Various artists	Hindko, Potohari	
Aaya Laariye Ni	Musarrat Nazir (Other popular renditions sung collectively or individually by Meesha Shafi, Naeem Abbas Rufi, Shuja Haider and Aima Baig)	Punjabi	
Sasu Mangay	Naseebo Lal	Marwari	
Behy Guly Dazgwara	Various artists	Balochi	
Kala Shah Kala	Various artists	Punjabi	
Mama De	Rahim Shah	Pashto	
Taali De Thale Behke	Nazia Hassan	Punjabi	
Mehndi Ki Raat	Jawad Ahmed (OST of Pakistani TV series Mehndi)	Urdu	
Yehi To Hai Apnapan	Jawad Ahmed	Urdu	
Uchiyan Majajan	Jawad Ahmed	Punjabi	
Rani Pathani	Various artists	Seraiki	
Maine Tumhari Gaagar Se	Alamgir	Urdu	
Luddi Hey Jamalo	Various artists	Punjabi	
Boohey Barian	Hadiqa Kiani	Punjabi	
Lar Gaiyan	Shiraz Uppal, Zarish Hafeez	Punjabi	
Chitta Kukkar	Musarrat Nazir	Punjabi	
Mera Laung Gawacha	Musarrat Nazir	Punjabi	
Salonk Kasane	Various artists	Balochi	
Desi Thumka	Nouman Khalid, Osama Karamat	Punjabi	
Nach Punjaban	Abrar-ul-Haq	Punjabi	
Nachan Main Oday Naal	Abrar-ul-Haq	Punjabi	
Chamkeeli	Abrar-ul-Haq	Punjabi	
Nach Lain De	Abrar-ul-Haq	Punjabi	
Shakar Wandaan	Asrar		
Desaan Da Raja	Komal Rizvi, Qurram Hussain (Originally sung by Naseem Begum)		
Ballay Ballay	Shiraz Uppal, Harshdeep Kaur	Urdu	
Mehndi	Haroon	Urdu	
Josh Naal Pao Bhangra	JoSH	Punjabi	
Bismillah Karan	Nadeem Abbas Lunewala (Another popular version was sung by Shafaullah Rokhri)	Saraiki	
Gaddi Tu Manga De	Nadeem Abbas Lunewala	Punjabi	
Billo Hai	Herbie Sahara, Manj Musik, Nindy Kaur	Punjabi	
Addi Maar	Herbie Sahara, Manj Musik, Nindy Kaur	Punjabi	
Kanna Yaari	Eva B, Kaifi Khaleel, Wahab Bugti	Balochi	
Mundeya Dupatta Chad Mera	Noor Jehan	Punjabi	
Payal Baje Chan	Rahim Shah	Urdu	
Rang Laee Teri Mehndi	Rahim Shah	Urdu	
Mehndi Ni Mehndi	Musarrat Nazir	Punjabi	
Wedding Sehra	Mazhar Rahi, Fiza Ali	Punjabi	
Hara Rang	Mazhar Rahi, Fiza Ali	Punjabi	
Mehendi Wali Raat	Fiza Ali	Punjabi	
Zara Dholki Bajao Goriyo	Adnan Sami, Asha Bhosle		
Ik Pal	Hadiqa Kiani, Harshdeep Kaur	Punjabi	
Naache Re	Zeb Bangash, Jabar Abbas	Urdu	
Maghron La	Sabri Sisters, Rozeo	Punjabi	
Mehndi Tan Sajdi	Musarrat Nazir	Punjabi	
Mathe Te Chamkan	Musarrat Nazir	Punjabi	
Aayi Dekho Mehndi Ki Raat	Saleem Javed	Urdu	
Haye Dil Bechara	Jimmy Khan	Urdu	
Mehndi Rache Gi Mere Haath	Naheed Akhtar	Urdu	
Mehndi	Hadiqa Kiani	Urdu	
Washmallay	Various artists	Balochi	
Ye Hari Hari Choodiyan	Asifa	Punjabi	
Noori	Sunidhi Chauhan, Jabar Abbas	Urdu	
Aa Jao Zara Mehndi	Hassan Jahangir	Urdu	
Tu Ne Pehna Pyar Wala Gehna	Saleem Javed	Urdu	
Suhe Ve Cheere Waleya	Various artists	Punjabi	
Nehndiyan Lao	Various artists	Punjabi	
Laiyan Laiyan Main Tere Naal	Azra Jehan	Punjabi	
Shendi	Rosemary, Shani Arshad	Urdu	
Gali Gali	Shahid Mallya, Isheeta Chakrvarty	Urdu	
Challawa	Jabar Abbas, Nirmal Roy, Neha Chaudhry, Aashir Wajahat	Urdu	
Kala Doria	Various artists	Punjabi	
Latthay Di Chaadar	Various artists	Punjabi	
Sada Chidiyan Da Chamba	Various artists	Punjabi	
Na Ro Babla	Various artists	Punjabi	
Mukhray Peh Sehra Dala	Naseem Begum	Punjabi	
Main Nai Boldi	Humaira Arshad	Punjabi	
Main To Chali Ae Ri Sakhiyon Badesva	Runa Laila	Urdu	
Babula Ve Le Jaye Na Log Mujhko	Afshan Ahmed	Urdu	
Kahe Ko Byahi Bides	Various artists	Braj	
Chhaap Tilak	Various artists	Braj	
Ghar Nari	Fareed Ayaz Muhammad Qawwal	Braj	
Kala Jora	Various artists	Punjabi	
Mehndi Lawan Aiyan	Noor Jehan (Another popular versions sung by Shafaullah Rokhri)	Punjabi	
Mehndi Ki Raat	Junaid Jamshed	Urdu	
Khushi Aayi Bade Din Baad	Ali Haider	Urdu	
Shadi	Sahir Ali Bagga, Kiran Hazrarvi	Punjabi, Urdu	
Batiyan Bujhai Rakhdi	Shazia Manzoor	Punjabi	
Chan Makhna	Shazia Manzoor	Punjabi	
Laal Suit	Sarmad Qadeer (From Geo TV's serial Mannat Murad)	Punjabi	
Munday Lahore De	Mohsin Abbas Haider, Saima Jahan	Punjabi	
Phoolon Ki Bahaaron Mein Dulhan Aayi	Saleem Lodhi	Urdu	
Mitra Ve Mitra	Shazia Manzoor (From Geo TV's Baraat Series)	Punjabi	
Ballay Ballay Ni Tor	Shazia Manzoor (From Geo TV's Baraat Series)	Punjabi	
Ni Le De Mahi Kalyan	Shazia Manzoor (From Geo TV's Baraat Series)	Punjabi	
Aisa Jor Hai	Sara Raza Khan, Nabeel Shaukat Ali	Urdu	
Peela Rung	Hasan Ali Hashmi, Nehaal Naseem	Urdu	
Angna	Rosemary (OST of Pakistani TV series Angna)	Urdu	
Dilan Teer Bija (Note: Originally a 1987 political anthem for the Pakistan Peoples Party, this Balochi-language track has evolved into a popular staple at South Asian weddings, particularly in Pakistan and India's Deccan region)	Shabana Noshi	Balochi	
