= Lamberghini (song) =

Single by Ragini Tandan

Single by Ragini Tandan
- Language: Punjabi
- Released: 25 February 2018
- Studio: Water Productions
- Genre: Bhangra
- Length: 3:38
- Label: Speed Records; Times Music
- Composer: The Doorbeen
- Lyricist: The Doorbeen

Music video
- "Lamberghini" on YouTube

"Lamberghini" is a Punjabi-language song by the Indian singer-songwriter composer duo The Doorbeen featuring Ragini Tandan, released as a single by Speed Records on 25 February 2018 via YouTube and other online music streaming services. The title is a variant spelling of the car brand Lamborghini.

== Personnel ==
• Source -

- Artist – Ragini Tandan
- Starring – Harshdaa
- Compose / Music – The Doorbeen
- Lyrics – The Doorbeen
- Director – Ankush Kathuria
- Director of Photography - Arindam Bhattacharjee
- Executive Producer – Mansi Srivastava
- Assistant Director – Akanksha Narang & Pankaj Saraswat
- Producer – Domnic Pereira
- Line Assistant – Ganesh & Rayeez
- Produced by – Satinder Kaur
- Production House – Water Productions
- Location Courtesy – Planet Hollywood, Goa
- Label – Speed Records

== Music video ==
As of March 2020, the music video for "Lamborghini" on YouTube has 573 million views. It is one of the most viewed Punjabi songs on YouTube. In an interview singer The Doorbeen said "Hope Lamberghini features in a film."

== Renditions and remixes ==
=== Renditions ===
- On MTV Unplugged Season 8, singer Dhvani Bhanushali sang Lamberghini.

=== Remixes ===
- Lamberghini Remix by DJ Chetas
- Lamberghini Remix by DJ T
- Lamberghini Remix by Conexxion Brothers
- Lamberghini Remix by Shobhit Banwait (in collaboration with Pug Life Records®)
