= Justin Kimball (photographer) =

American photographer (born 1961)

- Born: 1961 (age 64–65)
- Education: Yale University School of Art, Rhode Island School of Design
- Occupations: Photographer, educator, artist
- Website: justinkimballphotography.com

Justin Kimball (born 1961) is an American photographer, educator, and artist. He currently teaches at Amherst College as the Conway Professor in New Media.

Museums which have collected Kimball's work include: The National Gallery of Art in Washington D.C., the J. Paul Getty Museum in Los Angeles, California, and the Cleveland Museum of Art in Cleveland, Ohio.

== Early life and education ==
Kimball was born in Princeton, New Jersey, in 1961. He earned a BFA in photography from the Rhode Island School of Design in 1985 while studying under professors Wendy Snyder MacNeil, Gary Metz, and William "Billy" Parker. After earning his BFA he worked as an assistant to photographer Duane Michals and then earned his MFA in photography from the Yale University School of Art in 1990 where he studied under photographers Richard Benson and Tod Papageorge.

== Career ==
After finishing his MFA, he taught as an assistant professor of Photography at The Rhode Island School of Design and then as an assistant professor of Photography at Orange Coast College. Kimball began teaching at Amherst College in 2001 and is currently the Conway Professor in New Media.

In 2003 Kimball was awarded the John Simon Guggenheim Memorial Foundation Fellowship which funded his first monograph, Where We Find Ourselves, published in 2006. The photographs, taken from the mid-1990s to the early 2000s, depict how Americans find leisure in the natural landscape. Photographs from the book were included in a collection of photographs presenting the changing ideas surrounding family in the U.S. titled Spirit of Family and was published by former Vice President Al Gore and his wife Tipper Gore.

== Publications ==
=== Books by Kimball ===
- Who By Fire, Essay by Eileen Myles, Radius, 2022 ISBN 9781955161008
- Elegy, Essay by Stanley Wolukau-Wanambwa, Radius, 2017 ISBN 9781942185062
- Pieces of String, Essay by Douglas Kimball, Radius, 2012 ISBN 9781934435502
- Where We Find Ourselves, Introduction by Richard B. Woodward, Center for American Places, 2006 ISBN 1930066465

=== Books as contributor ===
- Object Lesson: The Legacy of Richard Benson Aperture, 2022
- American Geography, Curator Sandra S. Phillips, San Francisco Museum of Modern Art, 2021
- The Photographer in the Garden, Eastman Museum/Aperture, 2018
- Storyteller: The Photographs of Duane Michals, Carnegie Museum of Art, 2015
- America in View: Landscape Photography 1865 to Now, Jan Howard, RISD Museum of Art, 2012
- Photography and Play, by Erin C. Garcia, Getty Publications, J.P. Getty Museum, 2012
- The Physical Print, A Brief Survey of the Photographic Process, Richard Benson, Yale, 2005
- Spirit of Family, Al Gore and Tipper Gore, Holt, 2002

== Group exhibitions ==
- 2024 Who By Fire, Personal Structures; Beyond Boundaries, European Cultural Council, Venice, Italy
- 2021 Object Lesson, TILT Institute for the Contemporary Image in collaboration with Aperture, Philadelphia, PA
- 2020 American Geography, San Francisco Museum of Modern Art, curated by Sandra S. Phillips (canceled/postponed due to COVID-19)
- 2019 All the Marvelous Surfaces: Photography Since Karl Blossfeldt, curated by Sarah Montross, deCordova Sculpture Park and Museum, Lincoln, MA
- 2018 From Starfield to MARS: Paul Manship and His Artist Legacy, Photographs by Barbara Bosworth, Justin Kimball, S. Billie Mandle, and Abelardo Morell
- 2018 In the Garden, (Traveling) George Eastman House International Museum Photography, Dickson Gallery and Gardens, Memphis, TN
- 2018 (un) Expected Families, Museum of Fine Arts Boston, Boston, MA
- 2013 The Ubiquity of Photography, Dada Post Gallery, Berlin, Germany
- 2012 Flesh and Bone: Photography and the Body, Portland Art Museum, Portland, Oregon

== Awards and grants ==
- 2003 John Simon Guggenheim Memorial Foundation Fellowship
- 2005 John Anson Kittredge Educational Fund, Harvard University
- 2012 Aaron Siskind Individual Photographer's Fellowship
- 2014 Philadelphia Museum of Art, Photography Competition, Winner
- 2015 Center Santa Fe, Project Development Grant

== Reception ==
=== Elegy ===
Elegy, Kimball's third monograph, "catalogs the victims of de-industrialization between 2012 and 2016" writes William Meyers, from The Wall Street Journal. Meyers describes Kimball's work as one that avoids the pristine colonial homes of New England and delves into a world of decay. Cate McQuaid, reviewing for The Boston Globe, writes that the "forceful photos of buildings and streets dominate" while the people although seemingly of less focus than the buildings around them, portray "lucid stories of struggle and the bonds of family and friends". Reviewing for Fraction Magazine, Lauren Greenwald concludes that "Kimball offers us a portrait of our times for reflection, sensitively and beautifully" and notes the apparent disconnection of the subjects from one another despite them being in the same photo. Their disconnection seems to make Greenwald consider if the images are composites and writes that "the disjunction between the elements in the image [is] too profound".

== Collections ==
- Cleveland Museum of Art, Cleveland, OH
- DeCorvoda Museum, Lincoln, MA
- George Eastman House, Rochester, NY
- J. Paul Getty Museum, Los Angeles, CA
- Milwaukee Art Museum, Milwaukee, WI
- Museum of Contemporary Photography, Columbia College, Chicago, IL
- Museum of Fine Arts Boston, Boston, MA
- Museum of Fine Arts Houston, Houston, TX
- National Gallery of Art, Washington, DC
- Nelson Atkins Museum, Kansas City, MO
- San Francisco Museum of Modern Art, San Francisco, CA
- The Art Institute of Chicago, Chicago, IL
- The High Museum of Art, Atlanta, GA
- The wareHouse, the Wieland Collection, Atlanta, GA
