= Michael P. Steinberg =

American historian

Michael P. Steinberg is the Barnaby Conrad and Mary Critchfield Keeney Professor of History, and a professor of music and German studies at Brown University. He was the president of the American Academy in Berlin from March 2016 to August 2018. Steinberg was previously the vice provost for the arts at Brown University. Steinberg has been a member of the executive board of the Consortium of Humanities Centers and Institutes (CHCI) and served as founding director of the Cogut Center for the Humanities at Brown, from 2005 to 2015. Between 2009 and 2013, he served as dramaturg on a joint production of Richard Wagner's Ring of the Nibelung for the Berlin State Opera and the Teatro alla Scala, Milan.

Educated at Princeton University and the University of Chicago, Steinberg has been a visiting professor at these two schools as well as at the Ecole des Hautes Etudes en Sciences Sociales in Paris and National Tsing Hua University in Taiwan. He was a member of the Cornell University Department of History between 1988 and 2005.

Steinberg's principal research interests include the cultural history of modern Germany and Austria, with particular attention to German-Jewish intellectual history and the cultural history of music. He has written and lectured widely on these topics, including for The New York Times and at the Lincoln Center for the Performing Arts, Bard Music Festival, Aspen Music Festival and School, and the Salzburg Festival.

Steinberg has received fellowships from the American Council of Learned Societies, National Endowment for the Humanities, John Simon Guggenheim Memorial Foundation as well as the Berlin Prize from the American Academy in Berlin. He is the author of studies of Hermann Broch, Aby Warburg, and Walter Benjamin, of Austria as Theater and Ideology: The Meaning of the Salzburg Festival (Cornell, 2000), of which the German edition (Ursprung und Ideologie der Salzburger Festspiele; Anton Pustet Verlag, 2000) won Austria's Victor Adler Staatspreis, in 2001.

== Bibliography ==
- Listening to Reason: Culture, Subjectivity, and Nineteenth-Century Music (Princeton, 2004);
- Reading Charlotte Salomon, co-edited with Monica Bohm Duchen (Cornell University Press, 2006);
- Judaism Musical and Unmusical (Chicago, 2007);
- The Trouble with Wagner (University of Chicago Press, 2018), and the co-edited volume
- Makers of Jewish Modernity (Princeton University Press, 2016)—winner of the 2016 National Jewish Book Award for general non-fiction.
