= Leónidas Lamborghini =

Argentine writer and poet

- Born: 1927
- Died: 2009 (aged 81–82)
- Occupations: Poet, writer

Leónidas Lamborghini (1927–2009) was an Argentine writer and poet.

== Poetry ==
- Sorry Saboteur, The Yellow Peril, 1955.
- The public poetry editions Buenos Aires. World Sentiment collection, No. 12, 1957.
- The public dialogues 1 and 2. New book editions, 1960.
- The legs on the sources, Outlook, 1965 and 1966. Sudestada, 1968.
- The Statue of Liberty, Alba Editions, 1967.
- Songs of Che, ARP, 1967.
- The song of Buenos Aires, Responsa for locals, Tango-Blues, City Editions, 1968.
- Called from Vietnam, 1968.
- The applicant unseated, Editions de la Flor, 1971. Mainland Publishing Books, 1989.
- Partitas, Corregidor editions, 1972. Selection Bicentennial Collection, National Library, 2008, ISBN 978-987-9350-43-0 .
- The riseñor, Marano-Barramedi editions, 1975. Reprinted by Argentine and hnos Publishers., 2012.
- Episodes, Wasteland editions, 1980. Library computer version Scribd and Google Site, Free Books, Raul Nunez editor Berea, Mexico City, 2009.
- Circus (Mexico 1977–1983), mainland editions Books, 1986.
- Verme and 11 rewrites Discépolo (Mexico), South American, 1988, ISBN 950-07-0494-3 .
- Confined Odysseus (Mexico-Buenos Aires 1989–1991), engraved with Blas Castagna, Van Riel Editions, 1992, ISBN 978-987-99087-0-9. Paperback, Adriana Hidalgo publisher, 2005, ISBN 987-1156-22-7 .
- Tragedies and travesties I (Mexico 1977–1990), mainland editions Books, 1994, ISBN 950-9551-11-2 .
- Comedieta (of globalization and art Jester), Estanislao editions, 1995. Selection, Heloise Cartonera, 2003 and 2010.
- Rewrites, edits the Dock, 1996, ISBN 987-9061-11-X
- Peron in Caracas, Folios editions, 1999.
- The garden of the poets (Mexico 1977–1990), Adriana Hidalgo publisher, 1999, ISBN 987-9396-02-2
- Character in penthouse and other grotesques, Dock editions, 1999, ISBN 987-9061-53-5
- Carrion latter form, Adriana Hidalgo publisher, 2001, ISBN 987-9396-63-4.
- Look to Domsaar, Paradiso Editions, 2003, ISBN 987-9409-29-9
- Laughter rogue (or morals Jester), Paradiso Editions, 2004, ISBN 987-9409-43-4
- Found in the trash, Paradiso Editions, 2006, ISBN 987-9409-65-5, ISBN 978-987-9409-65-7
- The player, play, Adriana Hidalgo publisher, 2007, ISBN 978-987-1156-61-0
- The applicant unseated poem in four times, Paradiso Editions, 2008, ISBN 978-987-9409-85-5
- Following the rabbit, the rabbit Following, Paradiso Editions, 2010, ISBN 978-987-1598-14-4
- Last days of Sexton and Blake, illustrated by Adriana Yoel, Paradiso Editions, 2011, ISBN 978-987-1598-28-1
- The genius of our race, Leonidas Lamborghini rewrites, edits Stanton, 2011, ISBN 978-987-24036-9-0 . Reissue rewrites (Dock, 1996), includes a second version of the poems "The two banks" and "Eva Peron at the stake" + "Tuesday, November 18, 1947", translation of Antonin Artaud homonymous poem published in Supplement Spotlight diary page 12 16 May 1995 + "Two rewrites", two poems that rewrite two versions of "Night and Death" by José María Blanco White, published in Journal of Poetry, No. 57, Fall 1998.
- The riseñor, Editors Argentine and brethren., 2012, ISBN 978-987-27895-0-3. Reissue of The riseñor (Marano-Barramedi editions, 1975). Score includes "The riseñor" work for mixed choir a cappella Julio Martin Viera.

== Biography ==
- Hernán Fontanet, Modelo y su(b)versión en la poética de Leónidas Lamborghini, New York, The Edwin Mellen Press, 2009.ISBN 978-0-7734-4884-1.
