= Rachel Lachowicz =

- Born: 1964 (age 61–62)
- Education: California Institute of the Arts, CA
- Notable work: Red Not Blue (1992), Sarah (1993),
- Movement: Conceptual art, Installation art, Studio art
- Website: lachowicz.com

Rachel Lachowicz (/ˈlækəwɪts/ LACK-ə-wits; born 1964) is an American artist based in Los Angeles, California. She is primarily recognized for appropriating canonical works by modern and contemporary male artists such as Carl Andre and Richard Serra and recreating them using red lipstick.

== Education and teaching ==
Lachowicz earned her BFA in 1988 from the California Institute of the Arts in Valencia, California. She is an associate Professor of Studio Art at Claremont Graduate University and has served as chair of the department.

== Work ==
Lachowicz’s practice includes sculpture, painting, performance, and other media. Her work complicates established divisions between abstraction and the body, appropriation and homage, the cosmetic and the artistic, commodities and crafts, subjectivity and objectification. In the 1990s she was associated with a movement termed 'Lipstick Feminism', which also claimed artists such as Janine Antoni. Lipstick feminists embraced sexuality and feminized modes of body crafting such as utilizing makeup while articulating critiques of male domination.

=== Appropriation and Materials ===
Since the 1980s, the artist’s appropriations have articulated a feminist position regarding the exclusion of women from art history and the continued inequities that women experience in the art world today. Her work raises questions that exceed the purview of appropriation, as her complex utilization of materials and rigorous production process push a wide range of established boundaries.

Apart from quoting iconic art made by men, Lachowicz further subverts that male canon through her use of lipstick, generally associated with femininity, as a material. Through this choice of material, Lachowicz explores issues of consumption, cosmetic politics, family ritual, embodiment, and abstraction.

=== "Red Not Blue," 1992 ===
Her performance Red Not Blue of 1992 gained attention in the art world for her provocative reinterpretation of artist Yves Klein Anthropométries performance of 1960. In Red Not Blue Lachowicz marked the nude body of a muscular man with red lipstick wax and instructed him to press his body against large pieces of paper in order to create silhouettes of his form. There was a live audience present at the performance, which took place at the Shohsana Wayne Gallery in Santa Monica, California, and there was a violinist playing throughout its duration. Beyond an inversion of the male gaze, Red Not Blue explored the politics of gendered embodiment by emphasizing the materiality of the male body, which often enjoys the empowered status of abstract personhood in contrast to the hypermateriality of the female body.

=== "Sarah," 1993 ===
One of Lachowicz’s most well known works is the sculpture titled Sarah (1993) in which she recreated noted minimalist artist Richard Serra’s One Ton Prop sculpture from 1969 utilizing red lipstick wax.

=== "Lay Back and Enjoy It," 2017 ===
In 2017, Lachowicz created an immersive installation at Shoshana Mayne Gallery in Santa Monica which engaged with themes of violence against women. The title of the exhibition, Lay Back and Enjoy It, sets the foundation and is a reference to basketball coach Bobby Knight's infamous comment regarding sexual assault. The artist comments on this behavior by recreating life-size structures of patriarchal authority—a church and a Sheriff's station—and coating them in her signature red lipstick. The structures themselves are references to movie sets for the 1973 Clint Eastwood film, High Plains Drifter, which illustrates two sexual assaults. The show was Lachowicz's seventh solo-exhibition.

== Awards and recognition ==
Lachowicz has received the John Simon Guggenheim Memorial Fellowship, Louis Comfort Tiffany Foundation Award, and a fellowship at the Skowhegan School of Painting and Sculpture.

Scholars such as Amelia Jones and Kirk Varnedoe have discussed her work in books and there is a large body of publications exploring her practice.

Lachowicz's work has been featured in national and international exhibitions: the Museum of Modern Art, New York; Institute of Contemporary Arts, London; The New Museum. New York; Museum of Contemporary Art, Los Angeles; and the MIT List Visual Arts Center in Cambridge, Massachusetts. Her work is part of the permanent collections of the Whitney Museum of American Art in New York, Museum of Contemporary Art in Los Angeles, Museum of Fine Arts, Boston; Denver Art Museum; Los Angeles County Museum of Art; Museum Moderner Kunst, Vienna; Israel Museum, Jerusalem, Palm Springs Art Museum, and the Orange County Museum of Art.
